= Mathieu Bertrand =

Canadian gridiron football player and coach (born 1977)

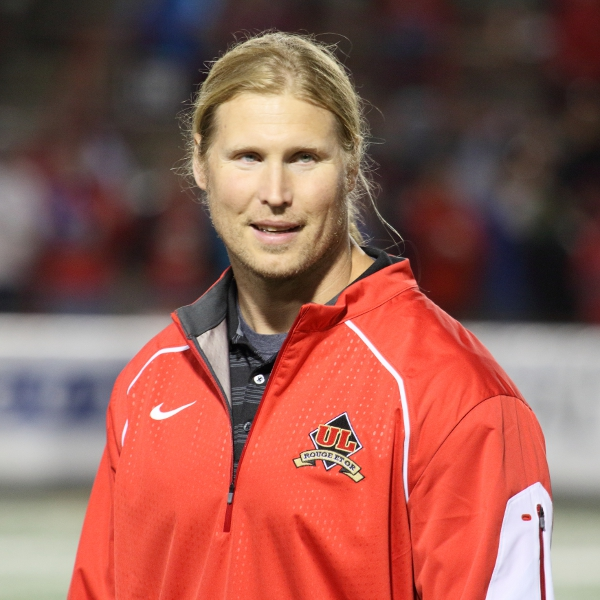
- Bertrand with the Laval Rouge et Or in 2015

Laval Rouge et Or
- Title: Head coach
- CFL status: National

Personal information
- Born: December 28, 1977 (age 48); Chambly, Quebec, Canada
- Listed height: 6 ft 3 in (1.91 m)
- Listed weight: 245 lb (111 kg)

Career information
- Positions: Quarterback, Fullback (No. 19, 30)
- High school: Laurendeau
- University: Laval
- CFL draft: 2003: 5th round, 44th overall pick

Career history

Playing
- 2003: Montreal Alouettes*
- 2004–2012: Edmonton Eskimos
- * Offseason or practice squad member only

Coaching
- 2013–2026: Laval Rouge et Or (Special team coordinator, Fullbacks coach)
- 2013–2026: Laval Rouge et Or (Head coach)

Awards and highlights
- Grey Cup champion (2005); 7× Vanier Cup champion (1999, 2003, 2013, 2016, 2018, 2022, 2024); CFLPA Pro Player All-Star (2008); Eskimos' Most Outstanding Rookie (2004); Eskimos' Most Outstanding Special Teams Player (2007)
- Stats at CFL.ca (archive)

Mathieu Bertrand (born December 28, 1977) is a Canadian former professional football player and is the head coach for the Laval Rouge et Or of U Sports football. He played at fullback for the Edmonton Eskimos of the Canadian Football League (CFL) for nine seasons and won a Grey Cup championship with the team in 2005.

== University career ==
Bertrand played CIS football for the Laval Rouge et Or at quarterback from 1998 to 2003. In his second year, he led the Rouge et Or to the first Vanier Cup title in program history in the 35th Vanier Cup in 1999. In his final year, in 2003, Bertrand led Laval to their second championship with a 14–7 victory over the two-time defending champion Saint Mary's Huskies in the 39th Vanier Cup.

== Professional career ==
Bertrand was drafted in the fifth round, 44th overall, in the 2003 CFL draft by the Montreal Alouettes, but returned to school following his release in training camp. He was signed by the Edmonton Eskimos on January 24, 2004, and was named the team's top rookie in 2004. Bertrand won a Grey Cup championship with the team in 2005. He was named a CFLPA All-Star in 2008 and 2009.

Bertrand was released by the Eskimos on March 1, 2013. He finished his career with 51 carries for 119 rushing yards and seven touchdowns along with 116 catches for 912 yards and three receiving touchdowns. He also played prominently on special teams where he had 71 special teams tackles in his career.

== Coaching career ==
Bertrand first joined the coaching staff of the Laval Rouge et Or in 2013 as the team's special teams coordinator and fullbacks coach. As a coach, he won five more Vanier Cup championships in 2013, 2016, 2018, 2022, and 2024. On November 19, 2026, Bertrand was named head coach of the Laval Rouge et Or football program after longtime incumbent, Glen Constantin, had resigned his position.
