= Laval Rouge et Or football =

Canadian university football team

Laval Rouge et Or
- Laval Rouge et Or logo
- First season: 1996
- Athletic director: Julie Dionne
- Head coach: Mathieu Bertrand; 1st year, 0–0 (–)
- Other staff: Justin Éthier (OC); Marc Fortier (DC)
- Home stadium: Telus Stadium
- Year built: 1994
- Stadium capacity: 12,750 seated (~20,903)
- Stadium surface: FieldTurf
- Location: Québec City, Québec, Canada
- League: U Sports
- Conference: QUFL/RSEQ (2001–present)
- Past associations: OQIFC (1996–2000)
- All-time record: 196–47–0 (.807)
- Postseason record: 65–18 (.783)

Titles
- Vanier Cups: 12; 1999, 2003, 2004, 2006, 2008, 2010, 2012, 2013, 2016, 2018, 2022, 2024
- Uteck Bowls: 8; 2004, 2006, 2008, 2010, 2012, 2013, 2016, 2018
- Mitchell Bowls: 5; 2003, 2011, 2017, 2022, 2024
- Churchill Bowls: 1; 1999
- Dunsmore Cups: 17; 1999, 2003, 2004, 2005, 2006, 2007, 2008, 2009,2010, 2011, 2012, 2013, 2016, 2017, 2018, 2022, 2024
- Hec Crighton winners: 2 Benoit Groulx, Kevin Mital

Current uniform
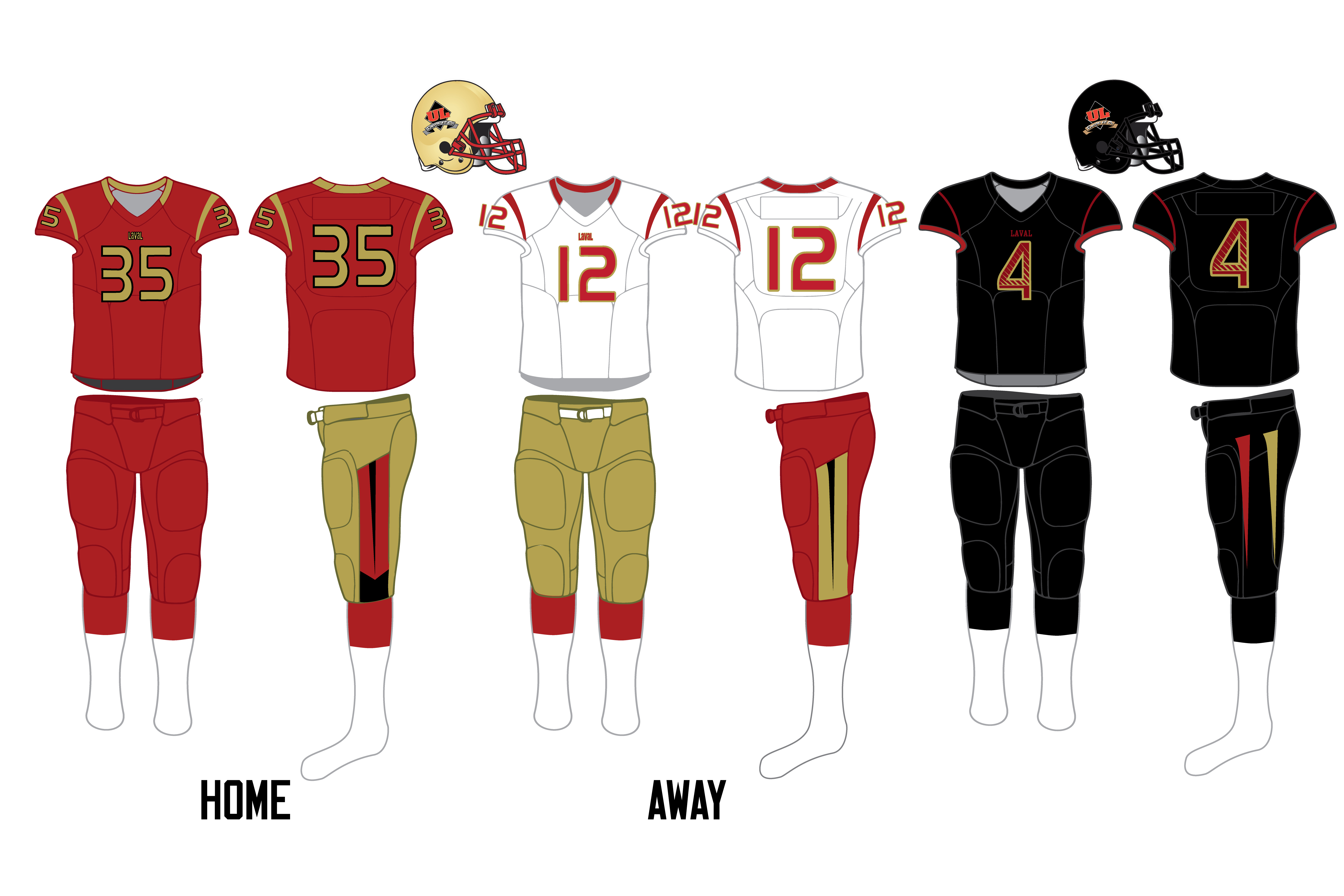
- Colours: Red, Gold, and Black
- Outfitter: Nike
- Rivals: Montreal Carabins
- Website: rougeetor.ulaval.ca

The Laval Rouge et Or football team represents Laval University in Quebec City in the sport of Canadian football in U Sports. The program began its first regular season in 1996 and has quickly become one of the most successful programs in Canadian university football history. The Rouge et Or have won a record 12 Vanier Cup championships and their most recent victory occurred at the 59th Vanier Cup in 2024. They are also the only program to have played in four straight Vanier Cups and have a record of 12–2 in Vanier Cup games. The Rouge et Or have also won the Dunsmore Cup 17 times since 1999, demonstrating their historical dominance in their conference.

== History ==
The Rouge et Or football program was first conceived of by Mike Labadie, a local physical education teacher, and Jacques Tanguay, a wealthy alumnus and avid sports fan. They had noted an exodus of French-speaking football players to English speaking schools because there was no Francophone option for them to continue their football careers. Tanguay invested heavily into the football program as the Rouge et Or began their first season in 1996, one year after the National Hockey League's Quebec Nordiques had left Quebec City to relocate to Colorado. Labadie was the team's first head coach and they finished the year with a 1–7 record. The following year, Jacques Chapdelaine was hired to become the team's head coach. The Rouge et Or were the first Canadian collegiate team to feature full-time, paid assistant coaches and the first to use video editing, further giving them a heightened competitive advantage.

Laval won their first national championship in 1999, against the Saint Mary's Huskies, under head coach Chapdelaine, bringing the Vanier Cup back to Quebec for the first time since 1987. Chapdelaine left the program following the 2000 season to continue his coaching career in the Canadian Football League. In 2001, current head coach Glen Constantin was promoted from his defensive coordinator position and led the team to 5–3 record and another Dunsmore Cup. However, during that season, the program had to vacate all victories due to use of an ineligible player. Consequently, that season is recorded as having eight regular season losses and three playoff losses.

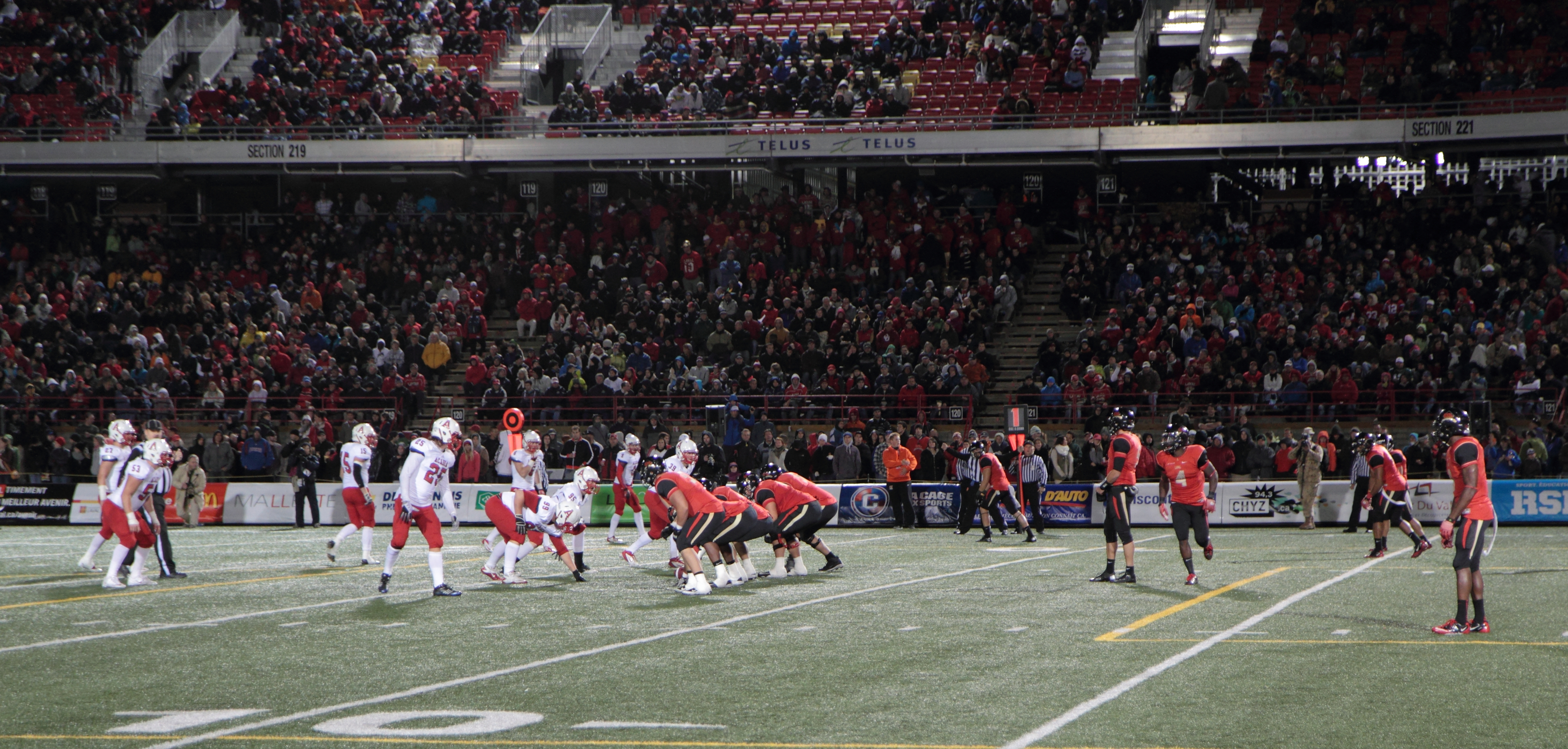
Football game featuring the Rouge et Or and Acadia Axemen at Laval in 2012.

For the following season in 2002, the Rouge et Or finished 6-2 and lost to the Concordia Stingers in the QUFL semi-final. This is notable because, as of 2024, it is the last time that the Rouge et Or failed to qualify for the Dunsmore Cup. The following season, the Rouge et Or began their conference dominance, scoring a school record 481 points in eight regular season games (over 60 points on average per game), en route to their second Dunsmore Cup. The Rouge et Or finished that season with their second Vanier Cup victory, also against Saint Mary's, in the 39th Vanier Cup which was Constantin's first as head coach.

In 2004, the Rouge et Or repeated as Vanier Cup champions for the first time in school history by defeating the Saskatchewan Huskies in the 40th Vanier Cup. Laval became the fourth program in Canadian collegiate history to repeat as Vanier Cup champions. It was the lowest scoring game in Vanier Cup history as Laval won by a score of 7-1 and it was the first Vanier Cup held outside of Toronto as the game was played at Ivor Wynne Stadium in Hamilton, Ontario.

In 2005, the Saskatchewan Huskies collected a measure of revenge as they defeated the Rouge et Or in the semi-final Mitchell Bowl in Saskatoon. However, in the following year, the two teams met again in the 2006 Vanier Cup, where the Vanier Cup was being played in Saskatoon for the first time and in the Huskies home stadium, Griffiths Stadium. The team claimed the rubber match by defeating the Saskatchewan Huskies 13–8, in a game played in temperatures below −20 °C. Linebacker Éric Maranda, that game's MVP, was chosen to play in the U.S. East–West Shrine Game in Houston, Texas on January 19, 2008.

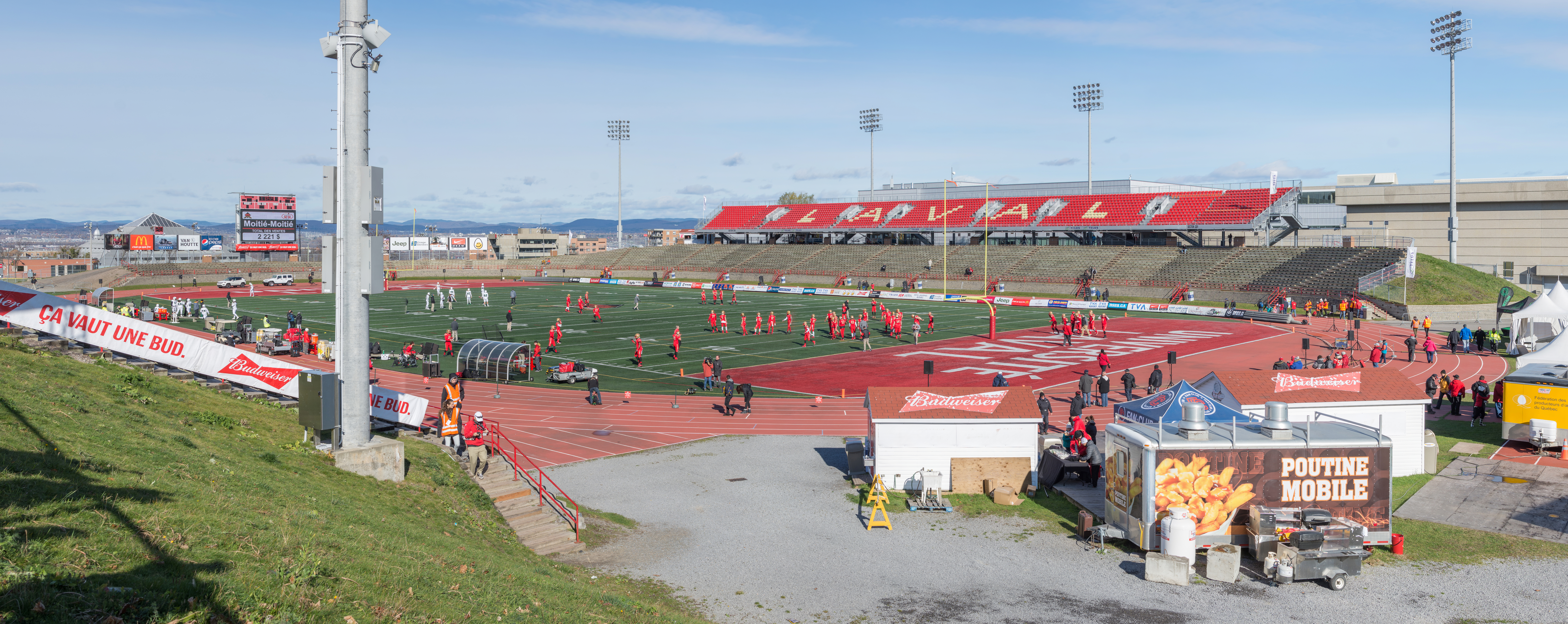
A practice in their home stadium.

For the 2007 season, the Rouge et Or claimed their fifth straight Dunsmore Cup championship, but lost to the Saint Mary's Huskies in the Uteck Bowl in Huskies Stadium in Halifax. It marked the last time, as of 2024, that Laval had lost to a team from the Atlantic University Sport conference. The following year, Laval, ranked first in Canada, played in the 2008 Vanier Cup, and defeated the third-ranked Western Mustangs 44–21 to claim their fifth national championship. It was the eighth time that Laval had finished their season paying in a national final or semi-final and, oddly, the first of those occurrences where the opposing team was not nicknamed the "Huskies." The 2008 season also saw the program produce its first Hec Crighton Trophy winner as Benoit Groulx was named the CIS football's most valuable player.

Laval University hosted the Vanier Cup game for the first time in 2009, but the Rouge et Or lost to the eventual champion Queen's Golden Gaels in the Mitchell Bowl played at Richardson Memorial Stadium in Kingston, Ontario. However, Laval was hosting back-to-back Vanier Cup games and the Rouge et Or qualified for the 46th Vanier Cup in 2010. There, the Rouge et Or dominated the Calgary Dinos 29–2 to win their sixth Vanier Cup championship. They were the first team in CIS history to win 13 straight games in 13 weeks of play after they played nine regular season games in 2010 (The QUFL extended the regular season to nine games in 2010). Their defence also set a Vanier Cup record for fewest yards allowed, 140, beating the previous record of 161 allowed by the Guelph Gryphons in 1984. Laval won in front of 16,237 hometown fans, becoming the second program to win the Vanier Cup at home, with the Toronto Varsity Blues winning in 1965 and 1993.

In the following season, Laval lost a Vanier Cup game for the first time in program history, as they fell 41-38 to the McMaster Marauders in double overtime in the 2011 Vanier Cup. This game was played at BC Place and was the first Vanier Cup to be played in Vancouver. The Rouge et Or would exact a measure of revenge the following year in a rematch against the Marauders in the 48th Vanier Cup. The team won a Canadian collegiate record seventh Vanier Cup championship in front of an also record crowd of 37,098 fans at the Rogers Centre in Toronto by a score of 37–14. In 2013, they won back-to-back national championships for the second time in program history when they defeated the Calgary Dinos in the 49th Vanier Cup by a score of 25–14. The game was again played at Telus Stadium on the campus of Laval University in front of 18,543 fans.

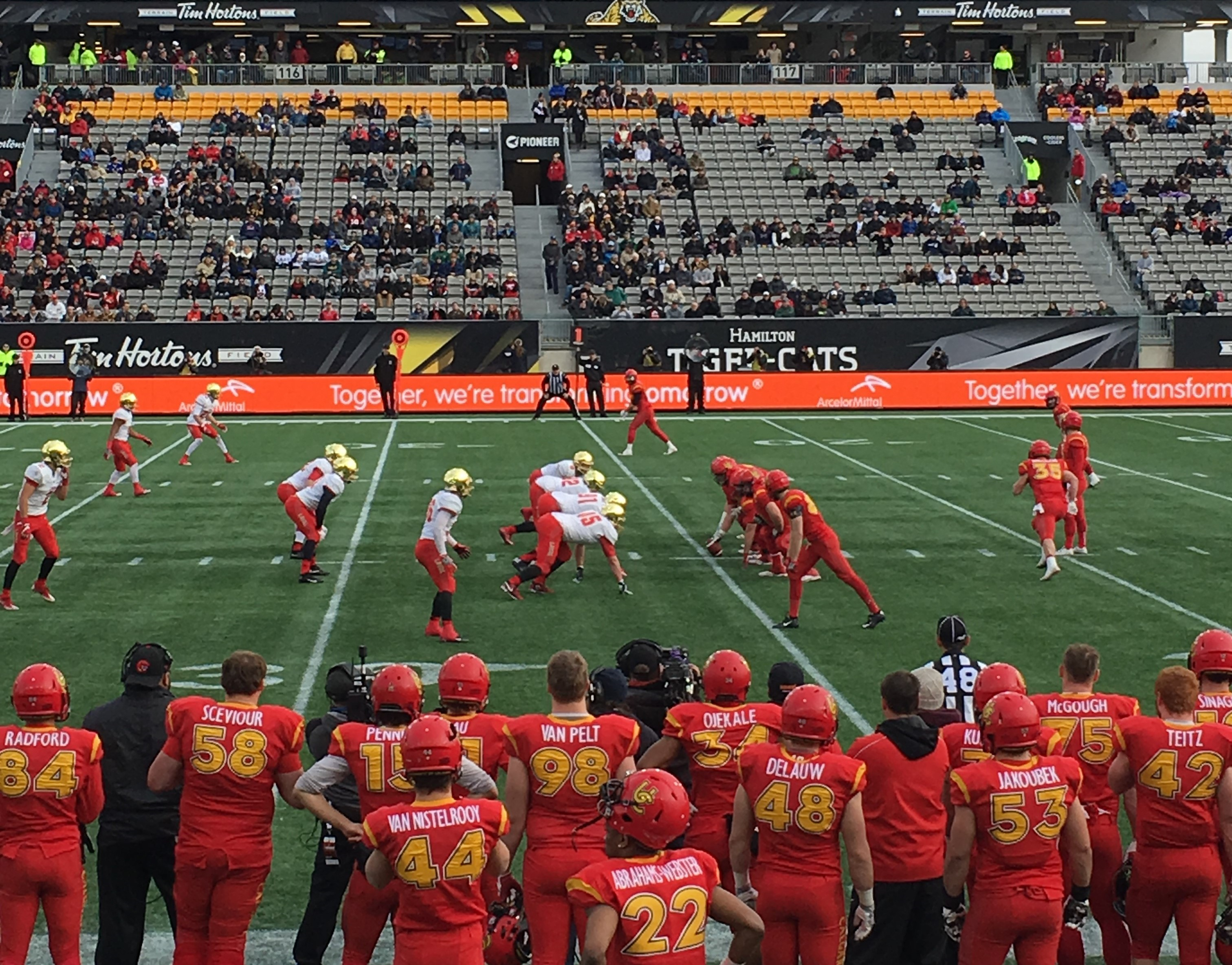
The Calgary Dinos on offence against the Laval Rouge et Or in the 52nd Vanier Cup in 2016.

The 2014 season saw the full rise of the Montreal Carabins to prominence, as they not only defeated the Rouge et Or in the regular season, but they also defeated them in the post-season and at home in the Dunsmore Cup. It snapped Laval's 70-game home winning streak (combined regular season and post-season) and 11-year Dunsmore Cup winning streak. Proving that 2014 was no fluke, the Carabins again defeated the Rouge et Or the following year in Quebec City in the Dunsmore Cup and would again represent the RSEQ in the Vanier Cup.

In 2016, the Rouge et Or finished in second place in the RSEQ after losing the head-to-head tie-breaker to the Carabins. Nonetheless, they defeated those Carabins in Montreal in the Dunsmore Cup and advanced to their tenth Vanier Cup appearance in the 52nd Vanier Cup. In that game, the Rouge et Or came back on top by squeezing a narrow 31–26 victory against the Calgary Dinos in Hamilton at Tim Hortons Field. The Rouge et Or qualified for the 53rd Vanier Cup the following year, but were soundly defeated by the Western Mustangs by a score of 39–17. It was their most lopsided loss since they were defeated by the Saint Mary's Huskies by a similar 22-point margin in their 24–2 loss in the 2007 Uteck Bowl. In 2018, the Rouge et Or would exact a measure of revenge by returning to the national championship game and defeating the Mustangs by a score of 34–20 in front of a home crowd in the 54th Vanier Cup. The win capped the fourth undefeated season in program history.

On October 20, 2019, a record 19,381 fans attended the Rouge et Or game against the Montreal Carabins as the program celebrated their 25th anniversary. The team finished in first place in 2019, but were defeated by the Carabins at home in the Dunsmore Cup, ending their three-year Vanier Cup appearance streak.

In 2022, the Rouge et Or ended a 3 years championship drought (one of these years being the 2020 season, canceled due to the COVID-19 pandemic) by winning both their 16th Dunsmore Cup, against the Carabins, and their 11th Vanier Cup, against the Saskatchewan Huskies. In 2023, the Rouge et Or finished in second place and lost the conference championship to the Carabins.

In the second game of the 2024 season, the Rouge et Or hosted the Carabins and broke their previous attendance record as 20,903 fans attended the game.

At the conclusion of the 2026 season, after Montreal had upset Laval 14-10 in the Jacques-Dussault Cup, longtime head coach Glen Constantin announced his retirement, ending his 25-season stint in the position. On November 19, 2026, the Rouge et Or announced that Mathieu Bertrand, a former Laval quarterback and the special teams coordinator under Constantin, had been picked as the new head coach.

== Season-by-season record ==
Season	Games	Won	Lost	Pct %	PF	PA	Standing	Playoffs
1996	8	1	7	0.125	91	229	7th in OQIFC	Did not qualify
1997	8	3	5	0.375	130	190	6th in OQIFC	Did not qualify
1998	8	4	4	0.500	181	156	3rd in OQIFC	Defeated Ottawa Gee-Gees in semi-final 48-42; Lost to Concordia Stingers in Dunsmore Cup 17-12
1999	8	6	2	0.750	237	123	3rd in OQIFC	Defeated Concordia Stingers in semi-final 42-16; Defeated Ottawa Gee-Gees in Dunsmore Cup 38-6; Defeated Saskatchewan Huskies in Churchill Bowl 27-21; Defeated Saint Mary's Huskies in 35th Vanier Cup 14-10
2000	8	8	0	1.000	237	103	1st in OQIFC	Defeated Bishop's Gaiters in semi-final 17-14; Lost to Ottawa Gee-Gees in Dunsmore Cup 26-9
2001	8	5	3	0.625	234	95	1st in QUFL (Note: Laval was later forced to forfeit all victories and postseason titles for use of ineligible players during the season. Actual results are listed here.)	Defeated Bishop's Gaiters in semi-final 48-12; Defeated McGill Redmen in Dunsmore Cup 42-14; Lost to Saint Mary's Huskies in Atlantic Bowl 48-8
2002	8	6	2	0.750	311	124	2nd in QUFL	Lost to Concordia Stingers in semi-final 29-21
2003	8	7	1	0.875	481	86	1st in QUFL	Defeated McGill Redmen in semi-final 47-7; Defeated Concordia Stingers in Dunsmore Cup 59-7; Defeated McMaster Marauders in Mitchell Bowl 36-32; Defeated Saint Mary's Huskies in 39th Vanier Cup 14-7
2004	8	7	1	0.875	222	66	2nd in QUFL	Defeated Concordia Stingers in semi-final 29-13; Defeated Montreal Carabins in Dunsmore Cup 30-11; Defeated Laurier Golden Hawks in Uteck Bowl 30-11; Defeated Saskatchewan Huskies in 40th Vanier Cup 7-1
2005	8	8	0	1.000	305	75	1st in QUFL	Defeated Sherbrooke Vert et Or in semi-final 72-14; Defeated Montreal Carabins in Dunsmore Cup 19-13; Lost to Saskatchewan Huskies in Mitchell Bowl 29-27
2006	8	7	1	0.875	218	100	1st in QUFL	Defeated McGill Redmen in semi-final 52-0; Defeated Concordia Stingers in Dunsmore Cup 28-12; Defeated Acadia Axemen in Uteck Bowl 57-10; Defeated Saskatchewan Huskies in 42nd Vanier Cup 13-8
2007	8	8	0	1.000	312	120	1st in QUFL	Defeated Montreal Carabins in semi-final 28-16; Defeated Concordia Stingers in Dunsmore Cup 35-10; Lost to Saint Mary's Huskies in Uteck Bowl 24-2
2008	8	8	0	1.000	337	60	1st in QUFL	Defeated Montreal Carabins in semi-final 28-16; Defeated Concordia Stingers in Dunsmore Cup 28-17; Defeated Calgary Dinos in Uteck Bowl 59-10; Defeated Western Mustangs in 44th Vanier Cup 44-21
2009	8	7	1	0.875	333	61	1st in QUFL	Defeated Concordia Stingers in semi-final 63-1; Defeated Montreal Carabins in Dunsmore Cup 31-7; Lost to Queen's Golden Gaels in Mitchell Bowl 33-30
2010	9	9	0	1.000	411	58	1st in QUFL	Defeated Bishop's Gaiters in semi-final 56-1; Defeated Sherbrooke Vert et Or in Dunsmore Cup 22-17; Defeated Western Mustangs in Uteck Bowl 13-11; Defeated Calgary Dinos in 46th Vanier Cup 29-2
2011	9	8	1	0.889	295	108	1st in RSEQ	Defeated Concordia Stingers in semi-final 33-7; Defeated Montreal Carabins in Dunsmore Cup 30-7; Defeated Calgary Dinos in Mitchell Bowl 41-10; Lost to McMaster Marauders in 47th Vanier Cup 41-38 (2OT)
2012	9	8	1	0.889	348	114	1st in RSEQ	Defeated McGill Redmen in semi-final 46-9; Defeated Sherbrooke Vert et Or in Dunsmore Cup 42-24; Defeated Acadia Axemen in Uteck Bowl 42-7; Defeated McMaster Marauders in 48th Vanier Cup 37-14
2013	8	8	0	1.000	273	92	1st in RSEQ	Defeated Sherbrooke Vert et Or in semi-final 32-11; Defeated Montreal Carabins in Dunsmore Cup 14-11; Defeated Mount Allison Mounties in Uteck Cup 48-21; Defeated Calgary Dinos in 49th Vanier Cup 25-14
2014	8	7	1	0.875	383	78	1st in RSEQ	Defeated Concordia Stingers in semi-final 74-18; Lost to Montreal Carabins in Dunsmore Cup 12-9 (OT)
2015	8	7	1	0.875	298	101	1st in RSEQ	Defeated Concordia Stingers in semi-final 52-8; Lost to Montreal Carabins in Dunsmore Cup 18-16
2016	8	7	1	0.875	289	78	2nd in RSEQ	Defeated Concordia Stingers in semi-final 39-14; Defeated Montreal Carabins in Dunsmore Cup 20-17; Defeated Laurier Golden Hawks in Uteck Bowl 36-6; Defeated Calgary Dinos in 52nd Vanier Cup 31-26
2017	8	7	1	0.875	266	77	1st in RSEQ	Defeated Sherbrooke Vert et Or in semi-final 45-0; Defeated Montreal Carabins in Dunsmore Cup 25-22; Defeated Calgary Dinos in Mitchell Bowl 35-23; Lost to Western Mustangs in 53rd Vanier Cup 39-17
2018	8	8	0	1.000	307	54	1st in RSEQ	Defeated Sherbrooke Vert et Or in semi-final 40-0; Defeated Montreal Carabins in Dunsmore Cup 14-1; Defeated St. Francis Xavier X-Men in Uteck Bowl 63-0; Defeated Western Mustangs in 54th Vanier Cup 34-20
2019	8	7	1	0.875	301	72	1st in RSEQ	Defeated Concordia Stingers in semi-final 40-8; Lost to Montreal Carabins in Dunsmore Cup 28-19
2020	Season cancelled due to COVID-19 pandemic							
2021	8	5	3	0.625	234	108	2nd in RSEQ	Defeated Concordia Stingers in semi-final 30-10; Lost to Montreal Carabins in Dunsmore Cup 28-19
2022	8	7	1	0.875	274	112	1st in RSEQ	Defeated Concordia Stingers in semi-final 38-27; Defeated Montreal Carabins in Dunsmore Cup 25-24; Defeated Western Mustangs in Mitchell Bowl 27-20; Defeated Saskatchewan Huskies in 57th Vanier Cup 30-24
2023	8	6	2	0.750	226	122	2nd in RSEQ	Defeated Concordia Stingers in semi-final 34-27 (OT); Lost to Montreal Carabins in Dunsmore Cup 12-6
2024	8	7	1	0.875	256	106	1st in RSEQ	Defeated Concordia Stingers in semi-final 41-18; Defeated Montreal Carabins in Dunsmore Cup 22-17; Defeated Regina Rams in Mitchell Bowl 17-14; Defeated Laurier Golden Hawks in 59th Vanier Cup 22-17
2025	8	7	1	0.875	236	110	1st in RSEQ	Defeated McGill Redbirds in semi-final 47-25; Lost to Montreal Carabins in Jacques-Dussault Cup 31-29
2026	8	8	0	1.000	322	99	1st in RSEQ	Defeated Concordia Stingers in semi-final 42-4; Lost to Montreal Carabins in Jacques-Dussault Cup 14-10
Totals (Note: Season totals are corrected for the 2001 season in which all Laval victories count as losses for that season.)	235	189	46	.549	20 first-place finishes			17 Dunsmore Cup championships 12 Vanier Cup championships

== Head coaches ==
#	Name	Term	GC	W	L	T	Pts	W%	PGC	PW	PL	PW%	Achievements
1	Mike Labadie	1996	8	1	7	0	2	.125	—	—	—	—	
2	Jacques Chapdelaine	1997–2000	32	21	11	0	42	.656	8	6	2	.750	Vanier Cup championship (1999)
3	Glen Constantin	2001–2026	283	237	46	—	348	.857	69	53	16	.768	2x Frank Tindall Trophy winner (2005, 2010); 11x Vanier Cup championship (2003, 2004, 2006, 2008, 2010, 2012, 2013, 2016, 2018, 2022, 2024)
4	Mathieu Bertrand	2027–present											

== National award winners ==
- Hec Crighton Trophy: Benoit Groulx (2008), Kevin Mital (2022)
- J. P. Metras Trophy: Carl Gourgues (2001), Dominic Picard (2005), Étienne Légaré (2008), Arnaud Gascon-Nadon (2010, 2011), Mathieu Betts (2016, 2017, 2018)
- Presidents' Trophy: Frédéric Plesius (2012), Adam Auclair (2017)
- Peter Gorman Trophy: Jean-Frédéric Tremblay (2000), Hugo Richard (2014), Mathieu Betts (2015), Justin Cloutier (2023)
- Russ Jackson Award: Josh Alexander (2001), Dillon Heap (2011)
- Lieutenant Governor Athletic Award: Mathieu Betts (2019)
- Frank Tindall Trophy: Glen Constantin (2005, 2010)

== Laval Rouge et Or in the CFL ==
As of the start of the 2026 CFL season, 11 former Rouge et Or players are on CFL teams' rosters:

- Cristophe Beaulieu, BC Lions
- Mathieu Betts, BC Lions
- Vincent Blanchard, Edmonton Elks
- Emeric Boutin, Ottawa Redblacks
- David Dallaire, Montreal Alouettes
- Marco Dubois, Montreal Alouettes
- Nathaniel Dumoulin Duguay, Hamilton Tiger-Cats
- Anton Haie, Calgary Stampeders
- Cyrille Hogan-Saindon, Montreal Alouettes
- Ian Leroux, Winnipeg Blue Bombers
- Kevin Mital, Toronto Argonauts
