= Christophe Normand =

Canadian football player (born 1991)

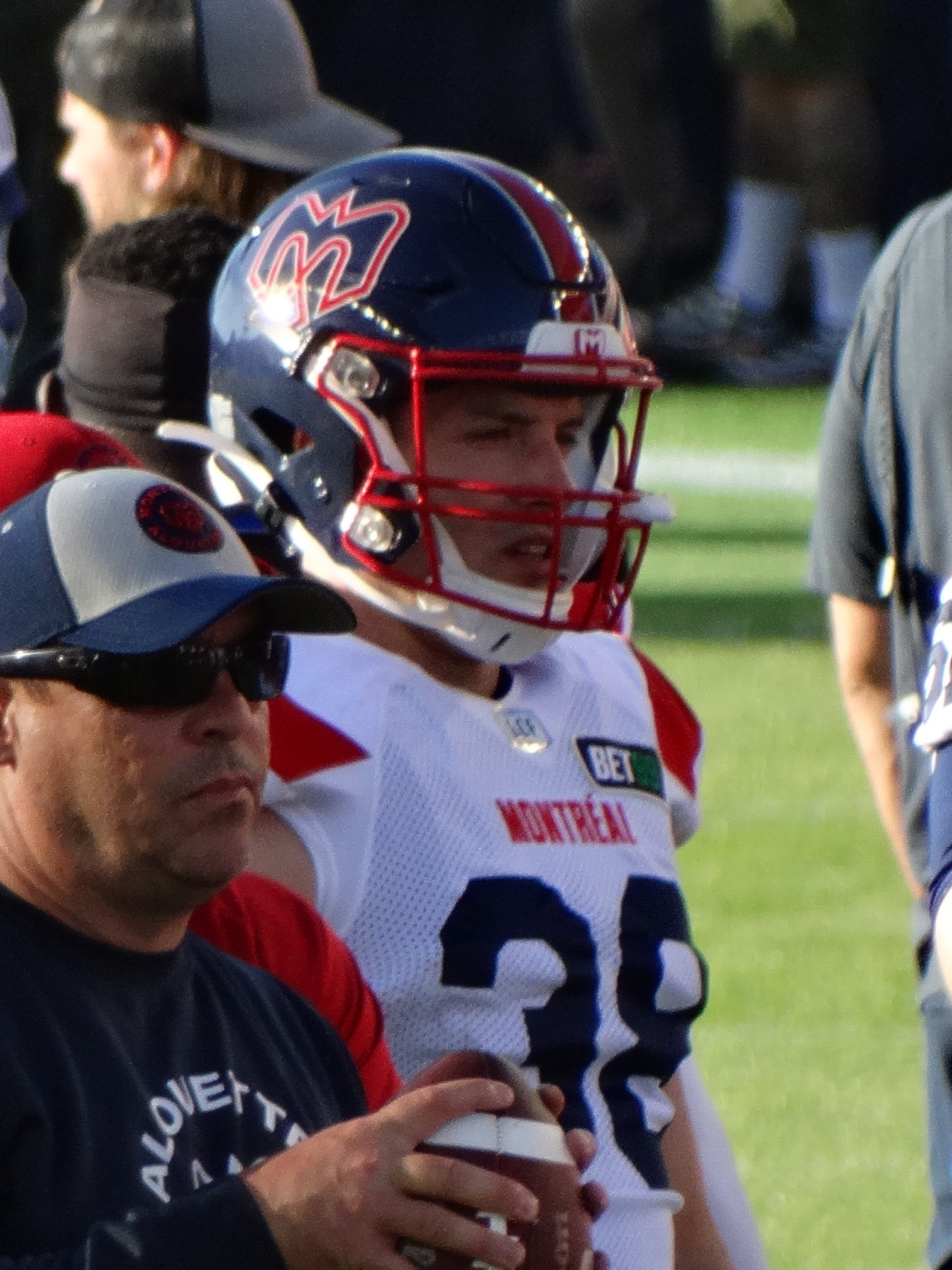
- Normand with the Montreal Alouettes in 2022

No. 38
- Position: Fullback

Personal information
- Born: October 17, 1991 (age 35); Bromont, Quebec, Canada
- Listed height: 6 ft 2 in (1.88 m)
- Listed weight: 238 lb (108 kg)

Career information
- University: Laval
- CFL draft: 2015: 4th round, 33rd overall pick

Career history
- 2015–2017: Winnipeg Blue Bombers
- 2018: Edmonton Eskimos
- 2019–2022: Montreal Alouettes

Awards and highlights
- 48th Vanier Cup champion; 49th Vanier Cup champion
- Stats at CFL.ca

Christophe Normand (born October 17, 1991) is a Canadian former professional football fullback who played for the Winnipeg Blue Bombers, Edmonton Eskimos and Montreal Alouettes of the Canadian Football League (CFL). Normand played CIS football for the Laval Rouge et Or and was part of the 2012 and 2013 Vanier Cup championship teams.

== Professional career ==
=== Winnipeg Blue Bombers ===
Normand was drafted in the fourth round, 33rd overall by the Winnipeg Blue Bombers in the 2015 CFL draft and signed with the team on May 21, 2015. He played three seasons in Winnipeg, appearing in 42 games. He carried the ball 11 times for 86 yards and caught 10 passes for 53 yards, made two defensive tackles and seven special teams tackles, and returned one kickoff.

=== Edmonton Eskimos ===
Normand spent the 2018 season with the Edmonton Eskimos where he played in 15 regular season games. He contributed with three receptions for 21 yards and seven special teams tackles.

=== Montreal Alouettes ===
Normand signed as a free agent with the Alouettes on February 12, 2019, to a two-year contract. He re-signed with the Alouettes on December 17, 2020. After becoming a free agent in February 2022, Normand and the Alouettes agreed to a new contract on April 12, 2022. On August 25, 2022 Normand was arrested and is facing two summary charges of luring a minor for sexual purposes. The incident allegedly took place on August 9 in Bromont, Quebec. The following day the Alouettes suspended Normand. He was released by the team on September 1, 2022.
