= 2018 U Sports football season =

- Duration: August 24, 2018 – October 27, 2018
- Hardy Cup champions: Saskatchewan Huskies
- Yates Cup champions: Western Mustangs
- Dunsmore Cup champions: Laval Rouge et Or
- Loney Bowl champions: St. Francis Xavier X-Men
- Mitchell Bowl champions: Western Mustangs
- Uteck Bowl champions: Laval Rouge et Or

Vanier Cup
- Date: November 24, 2018
- Venue: Quebec City, Quebec
- Champions: Laval Rouge et Or

U Sports football seasons seasons
- 2017 2019

The 2018 U Sports football season began on August 24, 2018, with the St. Francis Xavier X-Men visiting the Saint Mary's Huskies in Halifax, Nova Scotia. The Quebec Student Sport Federation teams played an hour later with the Laval Rouge et Or visiting the Sherbrooke Vert et Or and the McGill Redmen playing the Montreal Carabins. The Ontario University Athletics teams began play on August 25, 2018, and the Canada West teams opened their season one week later on August 31, 2018.

The conference championships were played on November 10 and the season will conclude on November 24 with the 54th Vanier Cup championship at PEPS Stadium in Quebec City, Quebec. 27 university teams in Canada are scheduled to play U Sports football, the highest level of amateur Canadian football.

== Regular season ==
=== Standings ===
2018 AUS standings
Team	W		L	PF		PA	Pts	Ply
Saint Mary's	7	–	1	188	–	141	14	†
St. FX	6	–	2	224	–	156	12	X
#10 Acadia	5	–	3	236	–	146	10	X
Mount Allison	2	–	6	162	–	220	4	
Bishop's	0	–	8	91	–	238	0	
† – Conference Champion; Rankings: U Sports Top 10

2018 OUA standings
Team	W		L	PF		PA	Pts	Ply
#1 Western	8	–	0	384	–	89	16	†
#5 Ottawa	6	–	2	211	–	179	12	X
#6 Guelph	5	–	3	236	–	175	10	X
#8 Carleton	5	–	3	255	–	224	10	X
McMaster	5	–	3	151	–	163	10	X
Waterloo	4	–	4	263	–	272	8	X
Laurier	4	–	4	248	–	222	8	
Queen's	3	–	5	244	–	226	6	
York	3	–	5	172	–	297	6	
Windsor	1	–	7	168	–	292	2	
Toronto	0	–	8	122	–	315	0	
† – Conference Champion; Rankings: U Sports Top 10

2018 RSEQ standings
Team	W		L	PF		PA	Pts	Ply
#2 Laval	8	–	0	307	–	54	16	†
#4 Montréal	6	–	2	256	–	46	12	X
McGill	2	–	6	109	–	233	4	X
Sherbrooke	2	–	6	84	–	228	4	X
Concordia	2	–	6	109	–	304	4	
† – Conference Champion; Rankings: U Sports Top 10

2018 Canada West standings
Team	W		L	PF		PA	Pts	Ply
#3 Calgary	8	–	0	313	–	133	16	†
#9 British Columbia	5	–	3	174	–	190	10	X
#7 Saskatchewan	5	–	3	258	–	174	10	X
Manitoba	3	–	5	195	–	224	6	X
Alberta	2	–	6	103	–	212	4	
Regina	1	–	7	107	–	217	2	
† – Conference Champion; Rankings: U Sports Top 10; *The Regina Rams forfeited three wins due to use of an ineligible player. Those games were then awarded as 1–0 wins to Alberta, UBC, and Manitoba.

== Post-season awards ==
=== Award-winners ===
	Quebec	Ontario	Atlantic	Canada West	NATIONAL
Hec Crighton Trophy	Hugo Richard (Laval)	Tre Ford (Waterloo)	Kaion Julien-Grant (St. Francis Xavier)	Adam Sinagra (Calgary)	Adam Sinagra (Calgary)
Presidents' Trophy	Marc-Antoine Dequoy (Montreal)	Fraser Sopik (Western)	Brad Herbst (Saint Mary's)	Ben Hladik (UBC)	Fraser Sopik (Western)
J. P. Metras Trophy	Mathieu Betts (Laval)	Kene Onyeka (Carleton)	Thomas Grant (Acadia)	Joel Van Pelt (Calgary)	Mathieu Betts (Laval)
Peter Gorman Trophy	Vincent Forbes-Mombleau (Laval)	Jack Hinsperger (Waterloo)	Shedler Fervius (Saint Mary's)	Tyson Philpot (Calgary)	Tyson Philpot (Calgary)
Russ Jackson Award	Jeremie-Billal Lardi (Sherbrooke)	Mackenzie Ferguson (Western)	Cameron Davidson (Acadia)	Jayden McKoy (Manitoba)	Mackenzie Ferguson (Western)
Frank Tindall Trophy	Glen Constantin (Laval)	Greg Marshall (Western)	Gary Waterman (St. Francis Xavier)	Wayne Harris Jr. (Calgary)	Greg Marshall (Western)

=== All-Canadian Team ===
Offence
	First Team	Second Team
Quarterback	Adam Sinagra (Calgary)	Hugo Richard (Laval)
Running Back	Cedric Joseph (Western) Tyler Chow (Saskatchewan)	Jordan Socholotiuk (St. Francis Xavier) Gabriel Polan (Sherbrooke)
Inside Receiver	Tyler Ternowski (Waterloo) Trivel Pinto (UBC)	Dylan Schrot (Manitoba) Gordon Lam (Waterloo)
Wide Receiver	Kurleigh Gittens Jr. (Laurier) Kaion Julien-Grant (St. Francis Xavier)	Regis Cibasu (Montreal) Hunter Karl (Calgary)
Centre	Samuel Lefebvre (Laval)	Jonathan Zamora (St. Francis Xavier)
Guard	David Brown (Western) Samuel Thomassin (Laval)	Mattland Riley (Saskatchewan) Jacob Czaja (St. Francis Xavier)
Tackle	Ketel Asse (Laval) Logan Bandy (Calgary)	Jesse Gibbon (Waterloo) Carter O'Donnell (Alberta)

Defence
	First Team	Second Team
Defensive Tackle	Evan Machibroda (Saskatchewan) Vincent Desjardins (Laval)	Trevaughn James (Laurier) Thomas Grant (Acadia)
Defensive End	Mathieu Betts (Laval) Kene Onyeka (Carleton)	Joel Van Pelt (Calgary) Tristian Koronkiewicz (Saskatchewan)
Linebacker	Fraser Sopik (Western) Ben Hladik (UBC) Brian Harelimana (Montreal)	Boston Rowe (Calgary) Brad Herbst (Saint Mary's) Lukas Korol (Guelph)
Free Safety	Stavros Katsantonis (UBC)	Daniel Valente Jr. (Western)
Defensive Halfback	Marc-Antoine Dequoy (Montreal) Will Amoah (Laurier)	Shae Weekes (Manitoba) Nate Rostek (Mount Allison)
Cornerback	Jamie Harry (Ottawa) Deane Leonard (Calgary)	Emile Chenevert (Laval) Bleska Kambamba (Western)

Special Teams
	First Team	Second Team
Kicker	Niko DiFonte (Calgary)	David Côté (Laval)
Punter	Brad Mikoluff (Manitoba)	Marc Liegghio (Western)
Returner	Kurleigh Gittens Jr. (Laurier)	Trivel Pinto (UBC)

== Post-season ==
The Vanier Cup is played between the champions of the Mitchell Bowl and the Uteck Bowl, the national semi-final games. In 2018, according to the rotating schedule, the Canada West Hardy Trophy championship team will visit the Yates Cup Ontario championship team for the Mitchell Bowl. The winners of the Atlantic conference's Loney Bowl will visit the Québec conference Dunsmore Cup championship team for the Uteck Bowl.

=== Conference Playoffs ===
==== Atlantic University Sport ====
November 3 Semi-final			November 10; Loney Bowl
			1	Saint Mary's	9
2	St. Francis Xavier	33	2	St. Francis Xavier	33
3	Acadia	10

==== Réseau du sport étudiant du Québec ====
November 3 Semi-finals
1	Laval	40
4	Sherbrooke	0
2	Montreal	48
3	McGill	2

November 10; Dunsmore Cup
1	Laval	14
2	Montreal	1

==== Ontario University Athletics ====
October 27; Quarter-finals
4	Carleton	30
5	McMaster	25
3	Guelph	45
6	Waterloo	34

November 3 Semi-finals
1	Western	39
4	Carleton	13
2	Ottawa	22
3	Guelph	27

November 10; 111th Yates Cup
1	Western	63
3	Guelph	14

==== Canada West Universities Athletic Association ====
November 3 Semi-finals
1	Calgary	37
4	Manitoba	13
2	British Columbia	28
3	Saskatchewan	31

November 10; 82nd Hardy Trophy
1	Calgary	18
3	Saskatchewan	43

=== National Semifinals ===
Uteck Bowl

Quarter	1	2	3	4	Total
St. Francis Xavier	0	0	0	0	0
Laval	16	23	17	7	63

at Telus Stadium (Quebec City)

- Date: November 17
- Game time: 12:30 p.m. EST
- Game weather: 0°C, cloudy
- Game attendance: 5747
- Referee: Stephane Roy
- TV announcers (Sportsnet 360, TVA Sports): Arash Madani, Andy Baechler
- Boxscore
Mitchell Bowl

Quarter	1	2	3	4	Total
Saskatchewan	7	10	0	7	24
Western	7	10	9	21	47

at TD Stadium (London, Ontario)

- Date: November 17
- Game time: 4:00 p.m. EST
- Game weather: 0°C, cloudy
- Game attendance: 3536
- Referee: K. Mickleboro
- TV announcers (Sportsnet 360, TVA Sports): Sid Seixeiro, Mike Morreale
- Boxscore

=== National Championship ===
54th Vanier Cup

Quarter	1	2	3	4	Total
Laval	10	7	10	7	34
Western	0	13	0	7	20

at Telus Stadium (Quebec City)

- Date: November 24
- Game time: 1:00 p.m. EST
- Game weather: Cloudy, −3 °C
- Game attendance: 12,380
- Referee: Walter Berry
- TV: Sportsnet, TVA Sports
- Boxscore
