= Ian Leroux =

Canadian football player (born 1999)

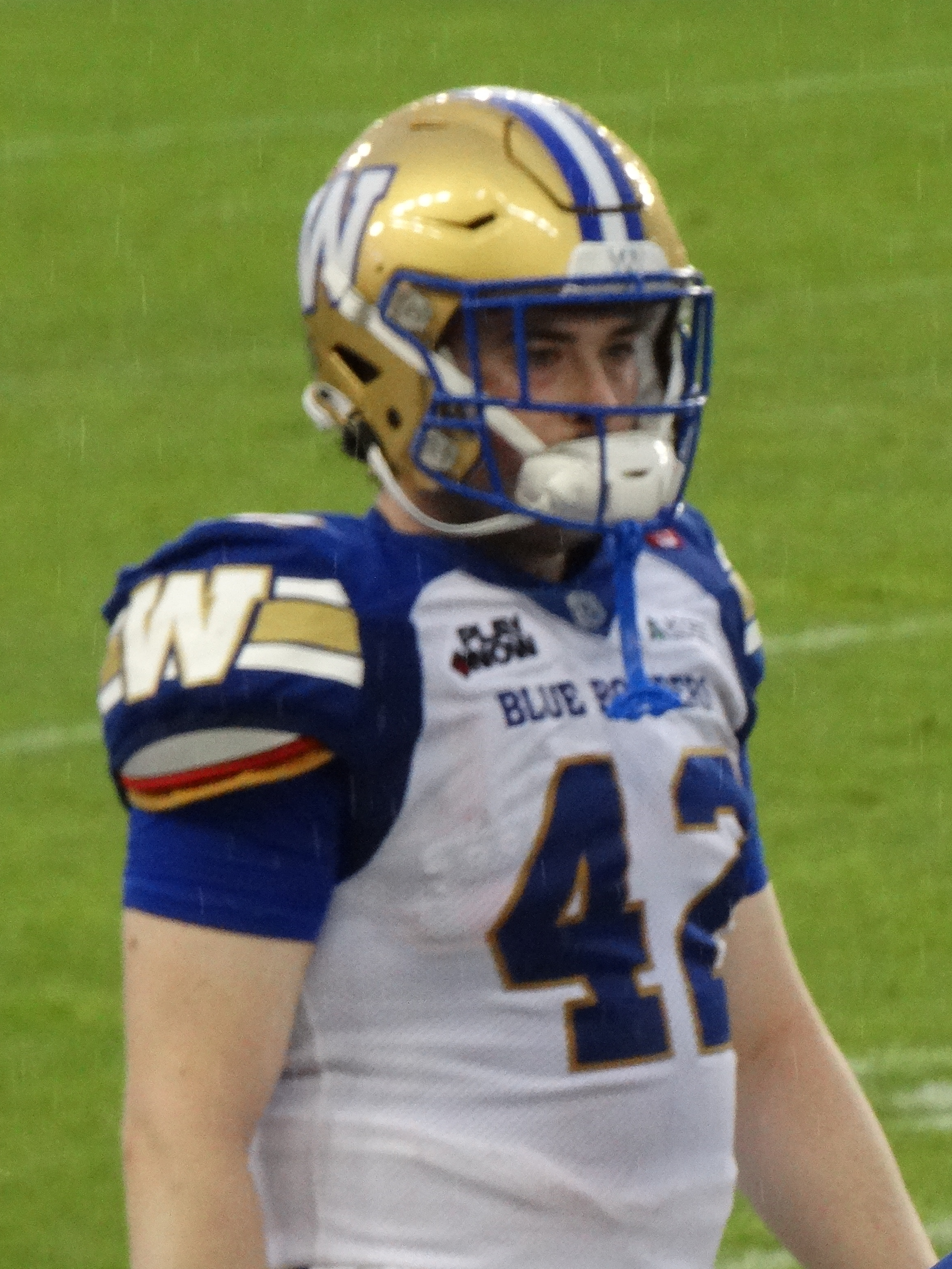
- Leroux with the Winnipeg Blue Bombers in 2025

No. 42 – Winnipeg Blue Bombers
- Position: Long snapper
- Roster status: Active
- CFL status: National

Personal information
- Born: May 6, 1999 (age 27)
- Listed height: 6 ft 1 in (1.85 m)
- Listed weight: 229 lb (104 kg)

Career information
- University: Laval
- CFL draft: 2024: 4th round, 37th overall pick

Career history
- Winnipeg Blue Bombers (2025–present)

Awards and highlights
- 2× Vanier Cup champion (2022, 2024)
- Stats at CFL.ca

Ian Leroux (born May 6, 1999) is a Canadian professional football long snapper for the Winnipeg Blue Bombers of the Canadian Football League (CFL). He played U Sports football at Laval.

== Early life ==
Ian Leroux was born on May 6, 1999. He played CEGEP football at Cégep Garneau in Quebec City, Quebec.

== University career ==
Leroux played U Sports football for the Laval Rouge et Or of Université Laval from 2021 to 2024. The 2020 U Sports football season was cancelled due to the COVID-19 pandemic. He dressed in 41 career games, helping Laval win the 57th Vanier Cup in 2022 and the 59th Vanier Cup in 2024. Leroux majored in physical therapy at Laval.

== Professional career ==
Leroux was rated the best long snapper in the 2024 CFL draft. He was selected by the Winnipeg Blue Bombers in the fourth round, with the 37th overall pick. He signed with the team on May 6, 2024. He was released before the start of the 2024 CFL season and returned to Laval for his final year of U Sports eligibility. Leroux re-signed with the Blue Bombers on November 26, 2024. He was released on June 1, 2025, before the start of the season. After long snapper Mike Benson suffered an injury in the season opener, Leroux was signed to Winnipeg's practice roster on June 16. He was promoted to the active roster on June 20 to replace Benson. Benson mentored Leroux while he was injured. Benson was later released on August 12, 2025, after being a healthy scratch for two games, cementing Leroux's spot as the team's long snapper.
