= 48th Vanier Cup =

2012 Canadian university football championship

Laval Rouge et Or	McMaster Marauders
(11–1)	(11–0)
37	14
Head coach: Glen Constantin	Head coach: Stefan Ptaszek
	1	2	3	4	Total
Laval Rouge et Or	0	12	19	6	37
McMaster Marauders	0	14	0	0	14
- Date: November 23, 2012
- Stadium: Rogers Centre
- Location: Toronto, ON
- Ted Morris Memorial Trophy: Maxime Boutin, Laval
- Bruce Coulter Award: Arnaud Gascon-Nadon, Laval
- Attendance: 37,098

Broadcasters
- Network: TV:TSN/TSN HD; RDS Radio:TSN Radio
- Announcers: (TSN): Rod Black, Duane Forde
- Ratings: 910,000 (TSN: 502,000; RDS: 408,000)

The 2012 Vanier Cup, the 48th edition of the Canadian university football championship, took place on Friday, November 23, 2012 at Rogers Centre in Toronto. The game featured a rematch of the previous year's Vanier Cup game as the McMaster Marauders attempted to become repeat champions against the Laval Rouge et Or. This was the second time (after 1976-1977) in Vanier Cup history that the same two teams played each other in consecutive years.

The Vanier Cup was played on the same weekend it hosted the 100th Grey Cup and was part of the week-long festivities that were planned for the event. This marked the second consecutive year that the two games were played in the same city on the same weekend; after the 47th Vanier Cup and 99th Grey Cup were played in Vancouver. However, the games have not been played in the same city on the same weekend since this game.

The Rouge et Or defeated the McMaster Marauders 37-14, winning the seventh Vanier Cup in program history. The 48th Vanier Cup also set an all-time record for attendance, with a crowd of 37,098.

== Game summary ==
Laval Rouge et Or (37) – TDs, Matthew Norzil, Maxime Boutin (2); FGs, Boris Bede (4); cons., Bede (3); conceded safety (2).

McMaster Marauders (14) – TDs, Kyle Quinlan, Dahlin Brooks; cons., Tyler Crapigna (2).

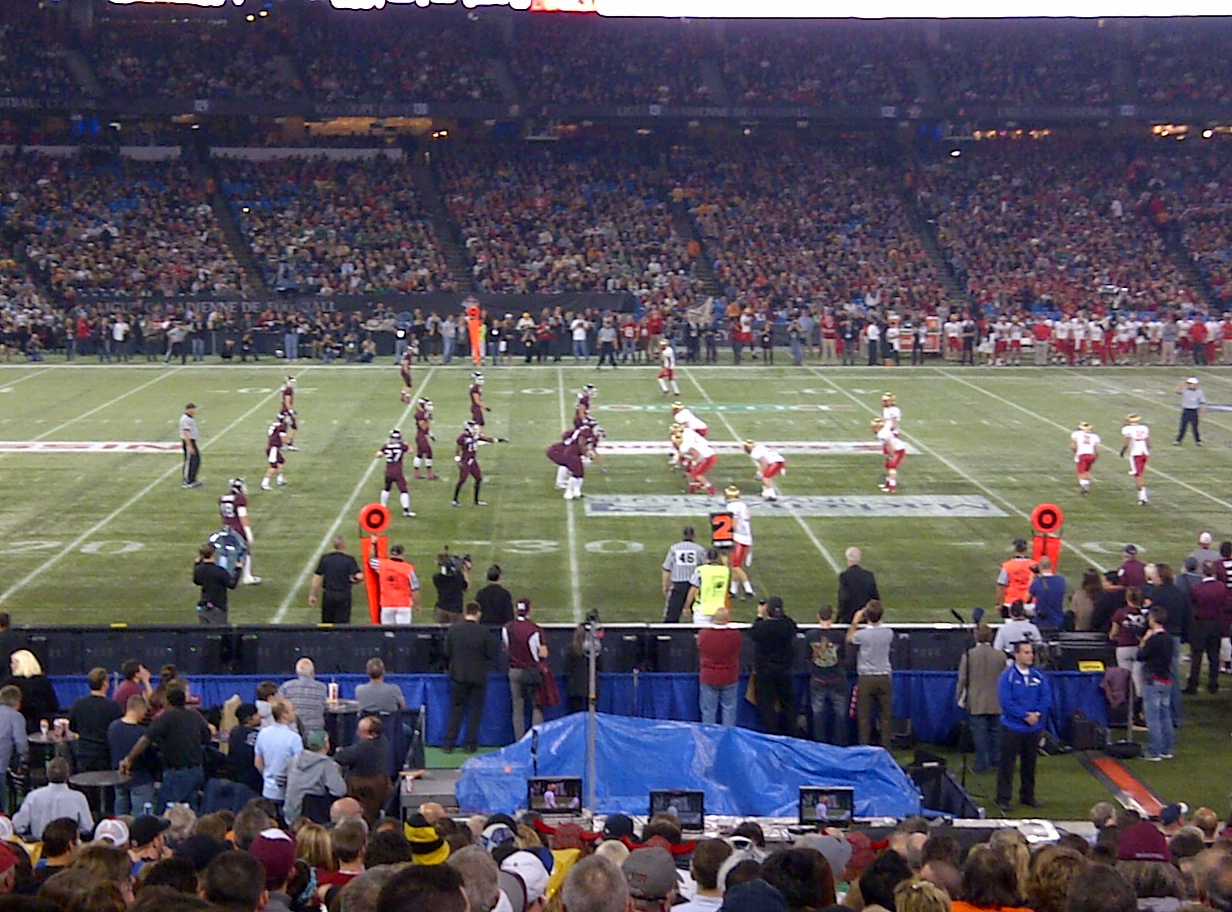
The Marauders on offence against the Rouge et Or in the 48th Vanier Cup.

=== Scoring summary ===
First Quarter
No scoring
Second Quarter
LAV – TD Matthew Norzil 28-yd pass from Tristan Grenon (Bede convert) (10:58) 7 – 0 LAV
LAV – Team safety (5:23) 9 – 0 LAV
LAV – FG Boris Bede 22-yd (3:03) 12 – 0 LAV
MAC – TD Kyle Quinlan 1-yd run (Crapigna convert) (1:41) 12 – 7 LAV
MAC – TD Dahlin Brooks 59-yd pass from Kyle Quinlan (Crapigna convert) (0:29) 14 – 12 MAC
Third Quarter
LAV – TD Maxime Boutin 11-yd run (Bede convert) (11:45) 19 – 14 LAV
LAV – Team safety (7:15) 21 – 14 LAV
LAV – TD Maxime Boutin 84-yd run (Bede convert) (4:26) 28 – 14 LAV
LAV – FG Boris Bede 37-yd (1:21) 31 – 14 LAV
Fourth Quarter
LAV – FG Boris Bede 20-yd (8:12) 34 – 14 LAV
LAV – FG Boris Bede 31-yd (4:25) 37 – 14 LAV

== Championships ==
The Vanier Cup is played between the champions of the Mitchell Bowl and the Uteck Bowl, the national semi-final games. In 2012, according to the rotating schedule, the Atlantic conference Loney Bowl champions (Acadia Axemen) met the Dunsmore Cup Quebec championship team (Laval Rouge et Or) for the Uteck Bowl. The Laval Rouge et Or defeated the Acadia Axemen in this game. The winners of the Canada West conference Hardy Trophy (Calgary Dinos) visited the Ontario conference's Yates Cup champion (McMaster Marauders) for the Mitchell Bowl, where the Marauders won 45-6.

=== Playoff bracket ===
Conference Quarter-finals
Laurier Golden Hawks	0
Queen's Golden Gaels	34
Windsor Lancers	35
Western Ontario Mustangs	56

Conference Semi-finals
Saskatchewan Huskies	9
Regina Rams	31
Manitoba Bisons	18
Calgary Dinos	57
Queen's Golden Gaels	39
Guelph Gryphons	42
Western Ontario Mustangs	28
McMaster Marauders	42
Saint Mary's Huskies	49
Mount Allison Mounties	11
Sherbrooke Vert et Or	42
Montreal Carabins	24
McGill Redmen	9
Laval Rouge et Or	46

Conference Championships
Regina Rams	14
Calgary Dinos	38
Guelph Gryphons	13
McMaster Marauders	30
Saint Mary's Huskies	9
Acadia Axemen	17
Sherbrooke Vert et Or	17
Laval Rouge et Or	40

National Semi-finals
Calgary Dinos	6
McMaster Marauders	45
Acadia Axemen	7
Laval Rouge et Or	42

48th Vanier Cup
McMaster Marauders	14
Laval Rouge et Or	37
