= Mathieu Betts =

Canadian gridiron football player (born 1995)

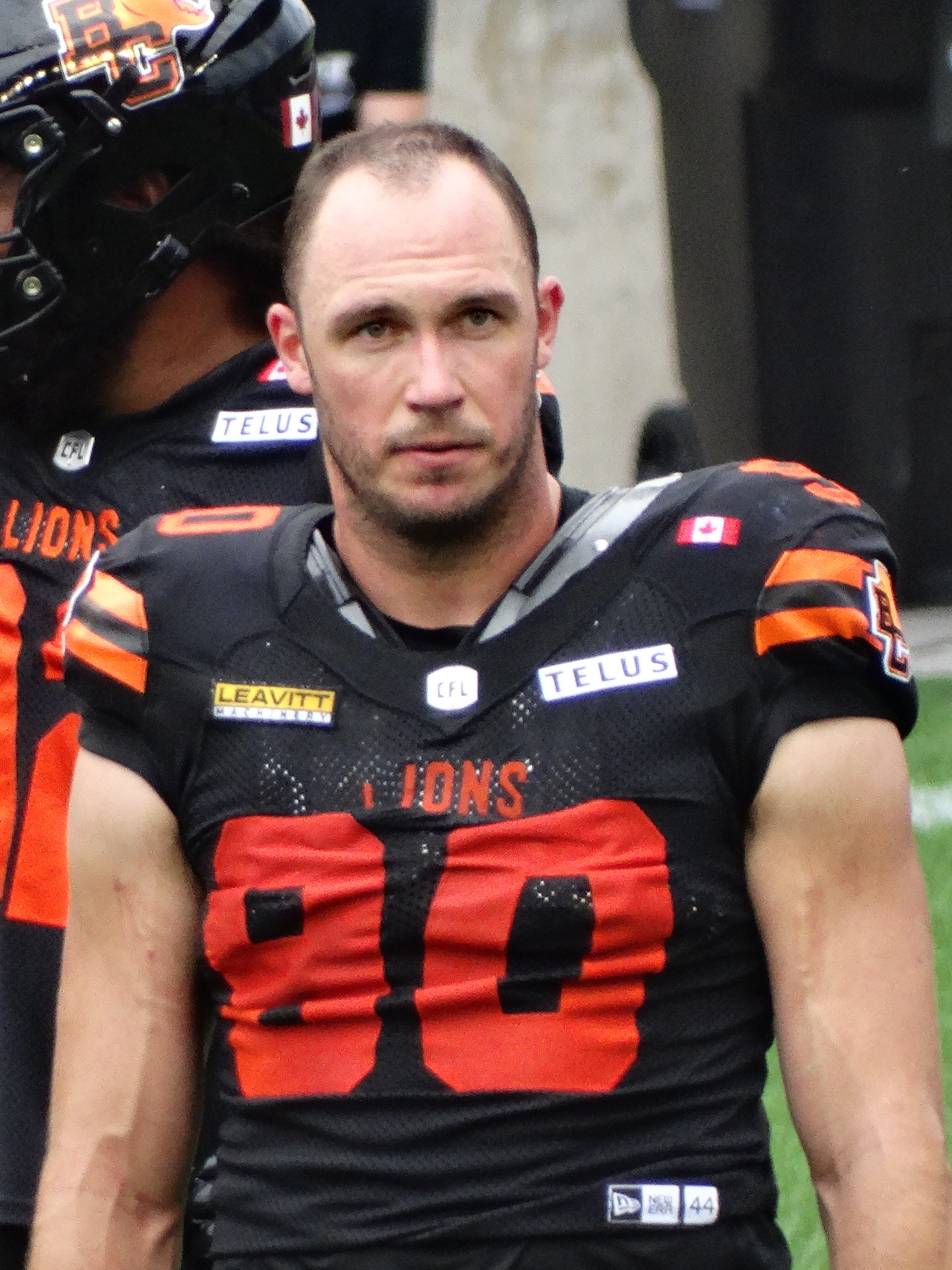
- Betts with the BC Lions in 2025

No. 90 – BC Lions
- Position: Defensive lineman
- Roster status: Active
- CFL status: National

Personal information
- Born: March 22, 1995 (age 31); Montreal, Quebec, Canada
- Listed height: 6 ft 2 in (1.88 m)
- Listed weight: 250 lb (113 kg)

Career information
- University: Laval
- CFL draft: 2019: 1st round, 3rd overall pick

Career history
- 2019: Chicago Bears*
- 2019–2021: Edmonton Eskimos / Elks
- 2022–2023: BC Lions
- 2024: Detroit Lions*
- 2024–present: BC Lions
- * Offseason or practice squad member only

Awards and highlights
- 2× CFL's Most Outstanding Defensive Player Award (2023, 2025); 2× Norm Fieldgate Trophy (2023, 2025); 2x CFL All-Star (2023, 2025); 2x CFL West All-Star (2023, 2025); 2× Vanier Cup champion (2016, 2018); Peter Gorman Trophy (2015); 3× J. P. Metras Trophy (2016, 2017, 2018); Lois and Doug Mitchell Award Winner (2019)

Career CFL statistics as of 2026
- Games played: 97
- Defensive tackles: 161
- Spec. team tackles: 4
- Sacks: 53
- Interceptions: 1
- Forced fumbles: 10
- Fumble recoveries: 1
- Stats at CFL.ca

Mathieu Betts (born March 22, 1995) is a Canadian professional football defensive lineman for the BC Lions of the Canadian Football League (CFL). Betts is the only player in U Sports football history to have won four major individual awards, after he won the 2015 Peter Gorman Trophy as the most outstanding rookie and three J. P. Metras Trophies between 2016 and 2018, as the most outstanding down lineman. He is also a two-time Vanier Cup champion, having won in 2016 and 2018.

== University career ==
Betts began his U Sports football career with the Laval Rouge et Or in 2015 where he recorded a nation-leading 12 sacks in eight regular season games played en route to being named the Most Outstanding Rookie. In 2016, he had nine sacks in eight regular season games, second-best in the country, and was named the Most Outstanding Down Lineman at season's end. He also won his first Vanier Cup championship as part of Laval's 52nd Vanier Cup win. He won his second consecutive J. P. Metras Trophy in 2017 and won for the third time in 2018, becoming the first player to ever win the award three times. He finished his fourth year of eligibility in 2018 with another Vanier Cup championship in the 54th Vanier Cup game.

== Professional career ==
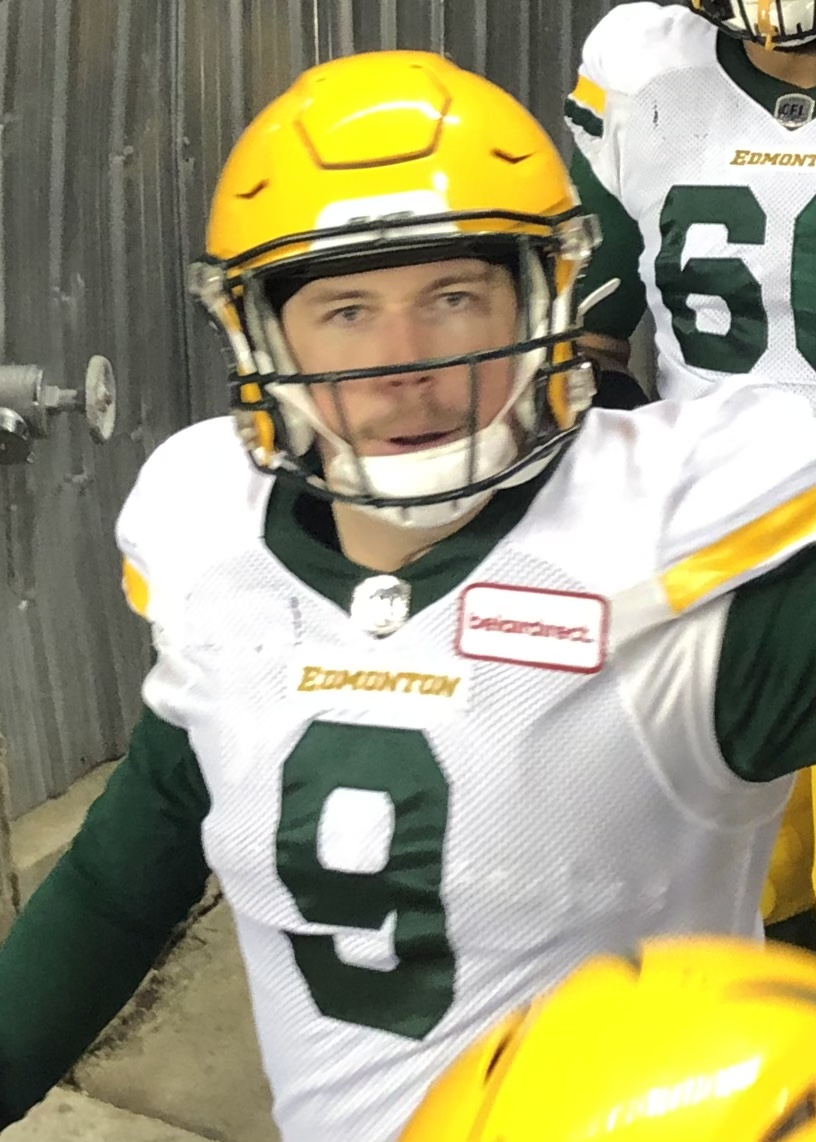
Betts with the Edmonton Elks in 2021

In the 2019 CFL Scouting Bureau Rankings for December, Betts was named as the top available prospect in the 2019 CFL draft. He was one of two U Sports players invited to play in the 2019 East–West Shrine Game. On May 2, he was selected third overall in the 2019 CFL draft by the Edmonton Eskimos, though at the time he was under contract with the Chicago Bears.

=== Chicago Bears ===
After the 2019 NFL draft on April 27, 2019, Betts signed with the Chicago Bears of the National Football League as an undrafted free agent on a three-year contract. Betts was among the final roster cuts on August 31, 2019.

=== Edmonton Eskimos / Elks ===
Betts formally joined the Edmonton Eskimos on September 9, 2019, after being selected by the Eskimos in the first round of the 2019 CFL draft. In his first game, Betts made a major contribution in making a sack, forcing a fumble against the Hamilton Tiger-Cats. The following week against the Ottawa Redblacks, Betts had another sack. In total, he played in six games and recorded one defensive tackle, two sacks, and one forced fumble in his rookie season. He did not play in 2020 due to the cancellation of the 2020 CFL season.

In 2021, Betts played in 13 of the 14 regular season games where he had 12 defensive tackles, but did not record a sack. He became a free agent upon the expiry of his contract on February 8, 2022.

=== BC Lions (first stint) ===
On the first day of free agency, on February 8, 2022, Betts signed with the BC Lions. Betts played in all 17 regular season games and contributed with 26 defensive tackles, seven sacks and two tackles on special teams. Following the season, in early January 2023, he had a workout with the Jacksonville Jaguars.

In 2023, Betts had a dominant season where he started in all 18 regular season games and recorded 44 defensive tackles, two special teams tackles, 18 sacks, three forced fumbles, and one blocked kick. Notably, on October 20, 2023, in BC's last game of the regular season, Betts broke the record for most sacks by a National player when he recorded his 18th sack and surpassed Brent Johnson (2005) and Jamaal Westerman (2015) who each had 17 in a single season. At the end of season, he was named the CFL's Most Outstanding Defensive Player and a CFL All-Star. He became a free agent upon the expiry of his contract on February 13, 2024.

=== Detroit Lions ===
On February 13, 2024, it was announced that Betts had signed with the Detroit Lions of the National Football League (NFL).

On August 27, 2024, Betts was waived by the Lions and cleared the next day, after going unclaimed.

=== BC Lions (second stint) ===
On August 29, 2024, it was announced that Betts had re-signed with the BC Lions, on a deal covering the remainder of the 2024 season. He signed a two-year contract extension with BC on December 19.

On September 11, 2026, Betts agreed to a one–year contract extension with the Lions.
