= Jean Philippe Abraham =

Canadian football player (born 1982)

Profile
- Position: Linebacker

Personal information
- Born: June 21, 1982 (age 44); Quebec City, Quebec, Canada
- Listed height: 6 ft 0 in (1.83 m)
- Listed weight: 216 lb (98 kg)

Career information
- High school: Champlain HS
- College: Laval

Career history
- 2006: Edmonton Eskimos

Jean Philippe Abraham (born June 21, 1982) is a Canadian former professional football linebacker for the Edmonton Eskimos. In his single season with the Eskimos, he appeared in 9 regular season games and made a single tackle.
