= Matthieu Proulx =

Canadian football player (born 1981)

No. 20
- Position: Safety

Personal information
- Born: April 16, 1981 (age 45); Plaster Rock, New Brunswick, Canada
- Listed height: 6 ft 1 in (1.85 m)
- Listed weight: 205 lb (93 kg)

Career information
- University: Laval
- CFL draft: 2005: 1st round, 5th overall pick

Career history
- 2005–2010: Montreal Alouettes

Awards and highlights
- 2× Grey Cup champion (2009, 2010); Frank M. Gibson Trophy (2005); CFL East All-Star (2009); 2× Vanier Cup champion (2003, 2004); Bruce Coulter Award (2004)
- Stats at CFL.ca

Matthieu Proulx (born April 16, 1981) is a former safety with the Montreal Alouettes of the Canadian Football League.

== Early life ==
Proulx was born in Plaster Rock, New Brunswick, but his family relocated to Gatineau. He began Canadian football as a sport to play in between baseball and skiing and had to travel to Gloucester, Ontario, to play at the midget level at age 18. To play football at CEGEP level, Proulx had to go to Montreal and played for Collège André-Grasset.

Proulx attended Université Laval, majoring in law, and played for the Rouge-et-Or from 2001 to 2004. Over 18 games between 2002 and 2004, he intercepted five passes for 74 yards and a touchdown, scored two touchdowns on punt returns, and recorded 54 tackles, six sacks, seven pass knockdowns, and two forced fumbles. He won back-to-back Vanier Cups with Laval in 2003 and 2004 and was awarded the Bruce Coulter Award as the most outstanding defensive player in the 2004 Vanier Cup.

== Professional career ==
Proulx was drafted by Montreal in the first round in the 2005 CFL draft and was the runner-up for the 2005 CFL's Most Outstanding Rookie Award.

2008 CFL season may be considered his breakthrough season, however. He had been scheduled to start at safety but suffered a hamstring injury at the beginning of the season. Nevertheless, he recovered to dress for 11 games, including five starts, and has moved ahead of Étienne Boulay on the depth chart.

He studied for the bar in Montreal in 2007 and pursues a career in law during the off-season and intends continue upon his retirement.

On March 1, 2011, Radio-Canada announced on its website that Proulx will officially announce his retirement from professional football the next day at the age 29.
