= 47th Vanier Cup =

2011 Canadian university football championship

Laval Rouge et Or	McMaster Marauders
(8–1)	(7–1)
38	41
Head coach: Glen Constantin	Head coach: Stefan Ptaszek
	1	2	3	4	OT	2OT	Total
Laval Rouge et Or	0	0	17	14	7	0	38
McMaster Marauders	6	17	0	8	7	3	41
- Date: November 25, 2011
- Stadium: BC Place Stadium
- Location: Vancouver, BC
- Ted Morris Memorial Trophy: Kyle Quinlan, McMaster
- Bruce Coulter Award: Aram Eisho, McMaster
- Halftime show: MEI Screaming Eagles Marching Band
- Attendance: 24,935

Broadcasters
- Network: TV:TSN/TSN HD Radio:TSN Radio
- Announcers: (TSN): Rod Black, Duane Forde, Lee Jones, Rod Smith, Mike Morreale, Steve Sumarah, Brian Dobie. (TSN Radio) Flagship TEAM 1410 Vancouver, TSN 990 Montreal, CHML 900 Hamilton : Jim Mullin, Jerome Erdman, Matt Baker, Moe Khan.
- Ratings: TV 665,000

The 2011 Vanier Cup, the 47th edition of the Canadian university football championship, took place on Friday, November 25, 2011, at BC Place in Vancouver. The McMaster Marauders defeated the Laval Rouge et Or 41–38 in only the second ever Vanier Cup to go into overtime. The Marauders won their first ever national championship while the Rouge et Or lost a Vanier Cup game for the first time. BC Place underwent a renovation, including a retractable roof, and hosted the Vanier Cup on the same weekend it hosted the Grey Cup. This marked the first time the two games were played at the same venue on the same weekend since 2007. This Vanier Cup is notable for being considered one of the best Canadian football games ever played.

McMaster quarterback Kyle Quinlan was named the Ted Morris Memorial Trophy winner after completing 36 of 55 passes for 482 yards passing and two touchdowns. He also rushed for 106 yards on 14 carries, accounting for 588 of the team's 675 total offensive yards. His 36 completions and 482 passing yards were both the second best totals ever recorded in a Vanier Cup game. McMaster linebacker Aram Eisho was named the top defensive player and awarded the Bruce Coulter Award after recording 11.5 tackles and one forced fumble.

== Game summary ==
Laval Rouge et Or (38) – TDs, Guillaume Rioux, Frédéric Plesius, Sébastien Lévesque, Julian Feoli-Gudino, Adam Thibault; FGs Boris Bede; cons., Bede (5).

McMaster Marauders (41) – TDs, James Hill, Chris Pezzetta, Matthew Peressini, Brad Fochesato; FGs Tyler Crapigna (4); cons., Crapigna (3); two-point cons., Peressini.

=== Scoring summary ===
First Quarter
MAC – FG Crapigna 26 (7:55) 3 – 0 MAC
MAC – FG Crapigna 37 (12:57) 6 – 0 MAC
Second Quarter
MAC – TD Hill 3 pass from Quinlan (Crapigna convert) (1:22) 13 – 0 MAC
MAC – TD Pezzetta 13 run (Crapigna convert) (5:25) 20 – 0 MAC
MAC – FG Crapigna 24 (13:37) 23 – 0 MAC
Third Quarter
LAV – TD Rioux 62 punt return (Bede convert) (3:03) 23 – 7 MAC
LAV – TD Plesius 37 interception return (Bede convert) (4:17) 23 – 14 MAC
LAV – FG Bede 18 (11:49) 23 – 17 MAC
Fourth Quarter
LAV – TD Lévesque 44 run (Bede convert) (1:57) 24 – 23 LAV
MAC – TD Peressini 9 run (Peressini pass from Quinlan) (9:07) 31 – 24 MAC
LAV – TD Feoli-Gudino 5 pass from Prud'homme (Bede convert) (12:47) 31 – 31
Overtime
MAC – TD Fochesato 26 pass from Quinlan (Crapigna convert) 38 – 31 MAC
LAV – TD Thibault 33 pass from Prud'homme (Bede convert) 38 – 38
MAC – FG Crapigna 20 41 – 38 MAC

=== Notable game facts ===
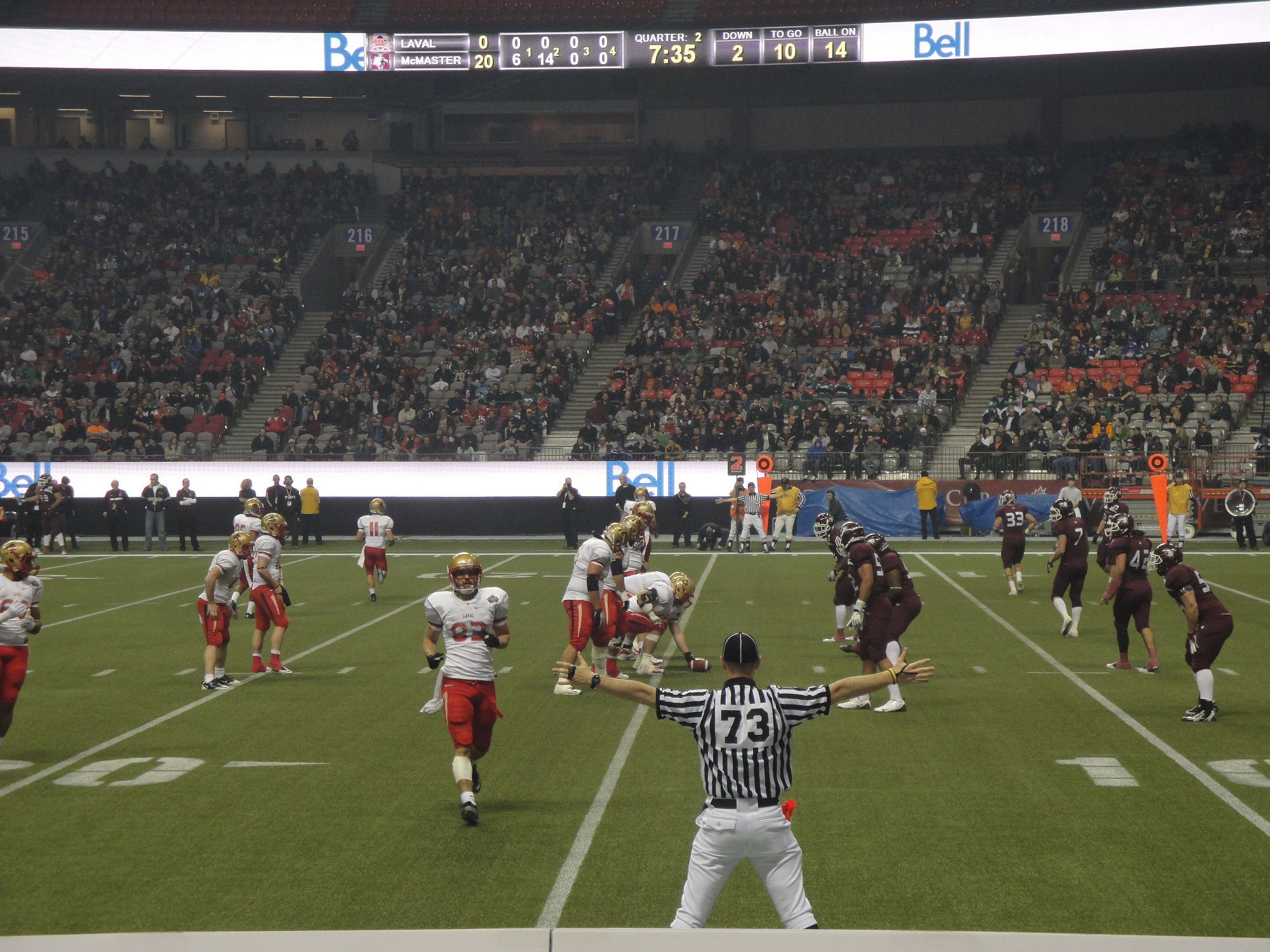
The Laval Rouge et Or on offense against the McMaster Marauders in the second quarter.

- It was only the second time in Vanier Cup history the national championship game was decided in overtime, with the first coming in 1994; and the first time a Vanier Cup championship was decided in double overtime.
- McMaster won their first Vanier Cup championship in their second ever appearance, with the first being a 1967 loss to the Alberta Golden Bears.
- Laval lost their first ever Vanier Cup game and it was the most points the Rouge et Or surrendered all season.
- This was the first Vanier Cup to be played in Vancouver and just the second in Western Canada after Saskatoon hosted the game in 2006.
- With the Laval loss, the Guelph Gryphons are now the only team with an undefeated record in Vanier Cup games.
- Only two teams in Vanier Cup history have had no points at the half and came back to win, with Saskatchewan in 1996 and Laval in 2004.
- The game was broadcast using the same facilities TSN employed for the Grey Cup, including 36 cameras plus cablecam.
- This was the first Vanier Cup to be broadcast on a national radio network (TSN Radio) with the flagship station TEAM 1410.

== Championships ==
The Vanier Cup is played between the champions of the Mitchell Bowl and the Uteck Bowl, the national semi-final games. In 2011, according to the rotating schedule, the Atlantic conference Loney Bowl champion Acadia Axemen met the Ontario conference's Yates Cup champion McMaster Marauders for the Uteck Bowl. The winners of the Canada West conference Hardy Trophy, the Calgary Dinos, hosted the Dunsmore Cup Quebec champion Laval Rouge et Or for the Mitchell Bowl.

== Playoff bracket ==
Conference Quarter-finals
Laurier Golden Hawks	10
Queen's Golden Gaels	14
Windsor Lancers	50
Ottawa Gee-Gees	33

Conference Semi-finals
Montreal Carabins	33
Sherbrooke Vert et Or	15
Concordia Stingers	7
Laval Rouge et Or	33
Saskatchewan Huskies	22
UBC Thunderbirds	27
Regina Rams	4
Calgary Dinos	16
Queen's Golden Gaels	13
McMaster Marauders	40
Windsor Lancers	27
Western Mustangs	33
St. FX X-Men	2
Saint Mary's Huskies	25

Conference Championships
Montreal Carabins	7
Laval Rouge et Or	30
UBC Thunderbirds	13
Calgary Dinos	62
McMaster Marauders	41
Western Mustangs	19
Saint Mary's Huskies	20
Acadia Axemen	39

National Semi-finals
Laval Rouge et Or	41
Calgary Dinos	10
McMaster Marauders	45
Acadia Axemen	21

47th Vanier Cup
Laval Rouge et Or	38
McMaster Marauders	41
