= Hugo Richard =

Canadian football player (born 1994)

Profile
- Position: Quarterback

Personal information
- Born: August 29, 1994 (age 32); Saint-Bruno-de-Montarville, Quebec, Canada
- Listed height: 6 ft 2 in (1.88 m)
- Listed weight: 225 lb (102 kg)

Career information
- University: Laval
- CFL draft: 2018: undrafted

Career history
- 2019–2020: Montreal Alouettes

Awards and highlights
- 2× Vanier Cup champion (2016, 2018); 2× Vanier Cup MVP (2016, 2018); 3× RSEQ MVP (2014, 2017, 2018); Peter Gorman Trophy (2014)
- Stats at CFL.ca

Hugo Richard (born August 29, 1994) is a Canadian former professional football quarterback who was a member of the Montreal Alouettes of the Canadian Football League (CFL). He played U Sports football with the Laval Rouge et Or from 2014 to 2018, where he was part of two Vanier Cup winning teams in 2016 and 2018 where he was named the Most Valuable Player for both games.

== Professional career ==
On January 7, 2019, it was announced that Richard had signed a two-year contract as an undrafted free agent with the Montreal Alouettes. In the pre-season, he completed three of four pass attempts for 23 yards and one interception. He began the season on the practice roster but was promoted to the active roster and dressed in his first professional game as the third-string quarterback on August 9, 2019, against the Saskatchewan Roughriders. In total, he dressed in three games during the 2019 Montreal Alouettes season. Following the 2019 season, he signed a new deal with the Alouettes on November 29, 2019. He did not play in 2020 due to the cancellation of the 2020 CFL season and he retired shortly before the 2021 season began on June 22, 2021.
