= Glen Constantin =

Canadian football coach (born 1964)

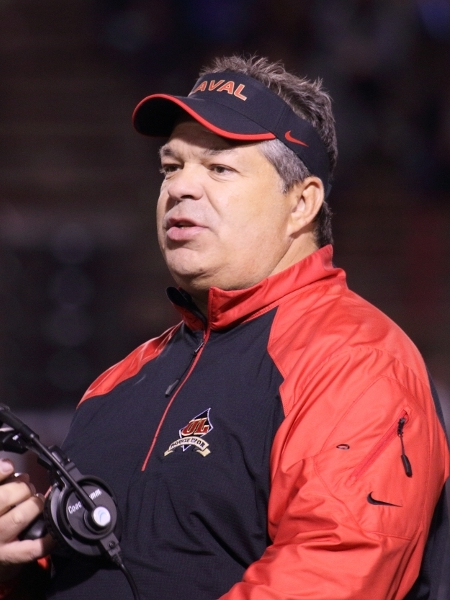
- Constantin during a Rouge et Or game in 2015.

Personal information
- Born: December 23, 1964 (age 61); Quebec City, Quebec, Canada

Career information
- University: Ottawa

Career history
- 1991–1994: Bishop's Gaiters (DC)
- 1995: Houston Cougars (LC)
- 1996–2000: Laval Rouge et Or (DC)
- 2001–2026: Laval Rouge et Or (HC)

Awards and highlights
- 12× Vanier Cup champion (1999, 2003, 2004, 2006, 2008, 2010, 2012, 2013, 2016, 2018, 2022, 2024); 2× Coach of the Year (2005, 2010)

Glen Constantin (born December 23, 1964) is a former Canadian football head coach, most notably for the Université Laval football team, the Laval Rouge et Or, from 2001 to 2026. He won 12 Vanier Cups with the team, including 11 as head coach which is the most by a single head coach in U Sports football history. He was named coach of the year in 2005 and in 2010. As head coach, Constantin has an all-time record of 237–42 (174–29 in regular season; 63–13 in playoffs), with 19 Quebec championships.

== Coaching career ==
Constantin began his coaching career with the Bishop's Gaiters in 1991 as the team's defensive coordinator. After four years in the role, he joined the Houston Cougars as their linebackers coach in 1995.

Constantin was recruited by Maurice Tanguay and his son Jacques to join the new Laval Rouge et Or football program in their second year of operation in 1996. Constantin joined the Rouge et Or that year as the team's defensive coordinator. He won his first Vanier Cup championship in this capacity as Laval defeated the Saint Mary's Huskies 14–10 in the 1999 Vanier Cup.

In 2001, Constantin was named head coach of the Rouge et Or football team. In his first year, he led the team to a 5–3 record and a win in the conference championship over the McGill Redmen before losing to the Saint Mary's Huskies in the Atlantic Bowl. However, Laval was forced to vacate all victories after they disclosed that an ineligible student-athlete had participated in all games that year.

Constantin won his first Vanier Cup as a head coach in 2003 after the Rouge et Or defeated the Saint Mary's Huskies 14–7 in the 39th Vanier Cup game. He led the program to a repeat victory in 2004. In 2005, Laval finished with a perfect 8–0 regular season record and Constantin was named the U Sports Football Coach of the Year.

In 2010, the Rouge et Or won the Vanier Cup against the Calgary Dinos, 29–2, after thirteen straight victories, which was a first in U Sports football history. Constantin was again awarded the Frank Tindall Trophy as coach of the year in 2010. In 2014, his football team established a new U Sports record with 22 straight wins.

On October 16, 2022, Constantin became U Sports football's all-time wins leader for a head coach after earning his 197th victory and surpassing Brian Towriss who had 196 wins.

On November 17, 2026, Constantin resigned as head coach of the Rouge et Or football team and accepted a new role Université Laval's Department of Athletics. He finished his head coaching career with a 237 wins and 42 losses in both regular season and postseason games. As head coach, he won 16 conference championships and 11 Vanier Cup championships.

== Head coaching record ==
Year	Team	Overall	Conference	Standing	Bowl/playoffs
Laval Rouge et Or (RSEQ) (2001–present)
2001^{[A]}	Laval	0–8	0–8	4th	
2002	Laval	6–3	6–2	2nd	
2003	Laval	11–1	7–1	1st	W Mitchell, W Vanier
2004	Laval	11–1	7–1	2nd	W Uteck, W Vanier
2005	Laval	10–1	8–0	1st	L Mitchell
2006	Laval	11–1	7–1	1st	W Uteck, W Vanier
2007	Laval	10–1	8–0	1st	L Uteck
2008	Laval	12–0	8–0	1st	W Uteck, W Vanier
2009	Laval	9–2	7–1	1st	L Mitchell
2010	Laval	13–0	9–0	1st	W Uteck, W Vanier
2011	Laval	11–2	8–1	1st	W Mitchell, L Vanier
2012	Laval	12–1	8–1	1st	W Uteck, W Vanier
2013	Laval	12–0	8–0	1st	W Uteck, W Vanier
2014	Laval	8–2	7–1	1st	
2015	Laval	8–2	7–1	1st	
2016	Laval	11–1	7–1	2nd	W Uteck, W Vanier
2017	Laval	10–2	7–1	1st	W Mitchell, L Vanier
2018	Laval	12–0	8–0	1st	W Uteck, W Vanier
2019	Laval	8–2	7–1	1st	
2021	Laval	6–4	5–3	2nd	
2022	Laval	11–1	7–1	1st	W Mitchell, W Vanier
2023	Laval	7–3	6–2	2nd	
2024	Laval	11–1	7–1	1st	W Mitchell, W Vanier
2025	Laval	8-2	7–1	1st	
2026	Laval	9-1	8–0	1st	
Laval:		237–42	174–29		
Total:		237–42			
National championship Conference title Conference division title or championship game berth

A. Laval originally finished the 2001 season with a 5–3 record, first place finish, and a Dunsmore Cup victory. However, it was determined that the team had used an ineligible player throughout the entire season and therefore vacated all regular season and post-season wins well after the 2001 season had concluded.
