= Kevin Mital =

Canadian gridiron football player (born 1999)

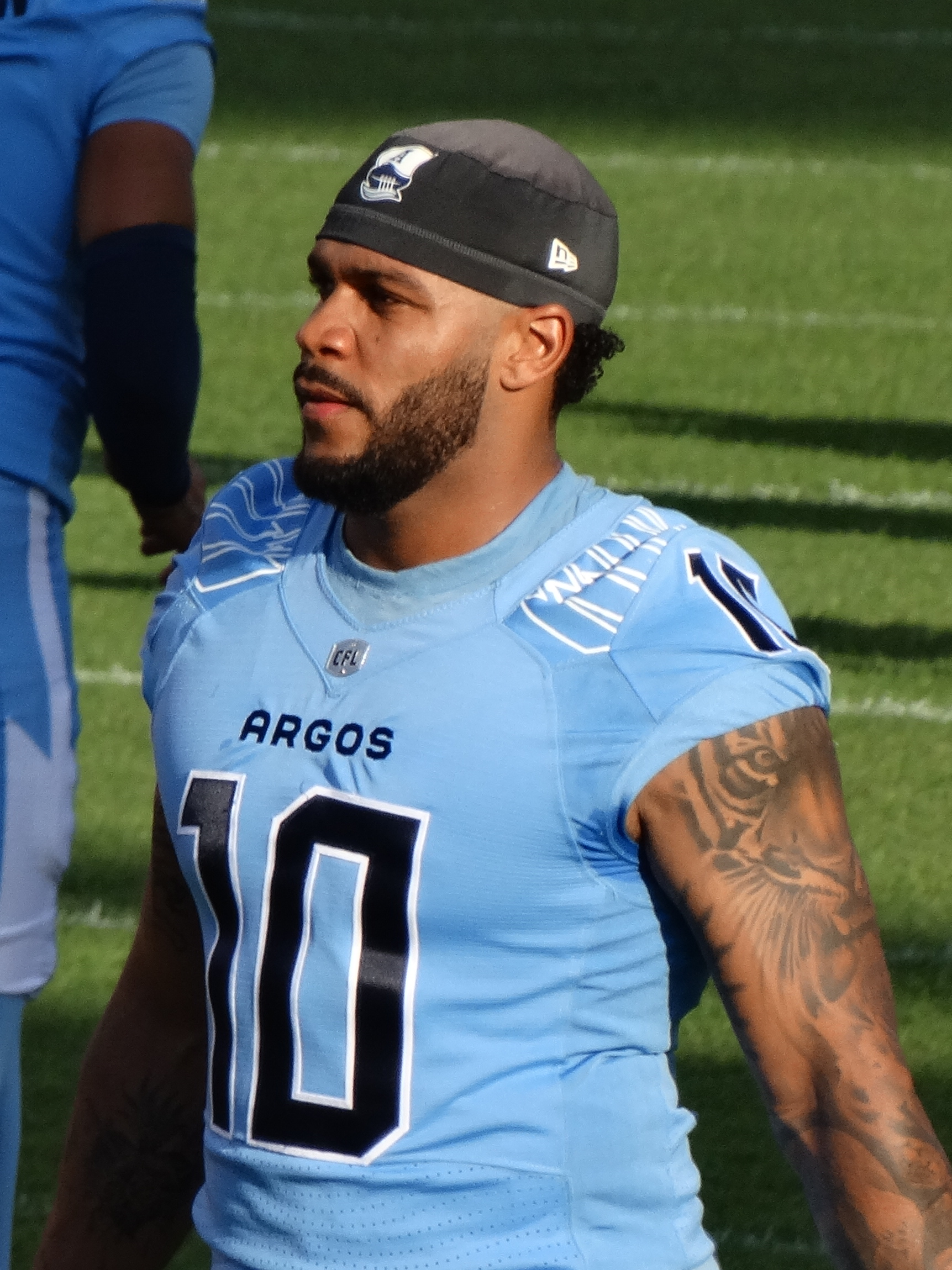
- Mital with the Toronto Argonauts in 2024

No. 10 – Toronto Argonauts
- Position: Wide receiver
- Roster status: Active
- CFL status: National

Personal information
- Born: April 1, 1999 (age 27); Longueuil, Quebec, Canada
- Listed height: 6 ft 0 in (1.83 m)
- Listed weight: 229 lb (104 kg)

Career information
- High school: Collège Charles-Lemoyne
- College: Syracuse (2019)
- University: Laval (2020–2023)
- CFL draft: 2024: 1st round, 5th overall pick

Career history
- 2024–present: Toronto Argonauts

Awards and highlights
- Grey Cup champion (2024); Vanier Cup champion (2022); Vanier Cup MVP (2022); Hec Crighton Trophy Winner (2022); First-team All-Canadian (2022); Second-team All-Canadian (2021)

Career CFL statistics as of 2026
- Receptions: 202
- Receiving yards: 2,095
- Receiving touchdowns: 9
- Stats at CFL.ca

Kevin Mital (born April 1, 1999) is a Canadian professional football wide receiver for the Toronto Argonauts of the Canadian Football League (CFL). He is a Grey Cup champion after winning with Argonauts in 2024. He played U Sports football for the Laval Rouge et Or of the RSEQ conference. He is a Vanier Cup champion after winning with the Rouge et Or in 2022 and was named the game's MVP. He also won the Hec Crighton Trophy in 2022 as U Sports football's most outstanding player.

== University career ==
=== Syracuse Orange ===
Mital first committed to play college football for the Syracuse Orange in 2019 where he used a redshirt season. However, on July 1, 2020, it was reported that he had decided to leave Syracuse and transfer schools.

=== Laval Rouge et Or ===
Mital transferred to Université Laval in 2020, where he intended to play for the Laval Rouge et Or, but the 2020 U Sports football season was cancelled. In 2021, he played in eight regular season games where he had 45 receptions for 554 yards and seven touchdowns and was named a Second-team All-Canadian.

In 2022, Mital had a dominant season as he finished first in the country in receptions, receiving yards, and receiving touchdowns, with 58 catches for 751 yards and 12 touchdowns in eight regular season games. For his strong season, Mital was named a First-team All-Canadian and won the Hec Crighton Trophy, becoming the first receiver to win the award since 2005. In the post-season, he led the Rouge et Or to a Dunsmore Cup championship as he recorded nine receptions for 116 yards and three touchdowns in the victory over the Montreal Carabins. Mital then played in his first Vanier Cup game where he led all receivers with eight receptions for 142 yards and had one passing touchdown for one yard. He was named the 57th Vanier Cup game's Most Valuable Player as the Rouge et Or defeated the Saskatchewan Huskies by a score of 30–24.

In 2023, Mital played in four games where he had 22 receptions for 280 yards and three touchdowns.

== Professional career ==
Pre-draft measurables
Height	Weight	40-yard dash	20-yard shuttle	Three-cone drill	Vertical jump	Broad jump	Bench press
6 ft 0 1/2 in (1.84 m)	229 lb (104 kg)	4.58 s	4.51 s	6.94 s	35.0 in (0.89 m)	9 ft 6 in (2.90 m)	20 reps
All values from CFL Combine

In the Canadian Football League's Scouting Bureau final rankings, he was named the 10th-best player available in the 2024 CFL draft. He was then drafted in the first round, fifth overall, by the Toronto Argonauts in the draft. It was announced that Mital had signed with the Argonauts on May 6, 2024. After beginning the year on the six-game injured list, he made his professional debut on July 27, 2024, against the Winnipeg Blue Bombers. He played in the last 12 games of the regular season where he had 18 receptions for 201 yards. He also played in all three post-season games, including the 111th Grey Cup where he had two receptions for 23 yards and his first career touchdown in the Argonauts' 41–24 victory over the Winnipeg Blue Bombers.

== Personal life ==
Mital was born to parents Chantal and Mario Mital and has one sister.
