= Mike Benson (Canadian football) =

Canadian gridiron football player (born 1987)

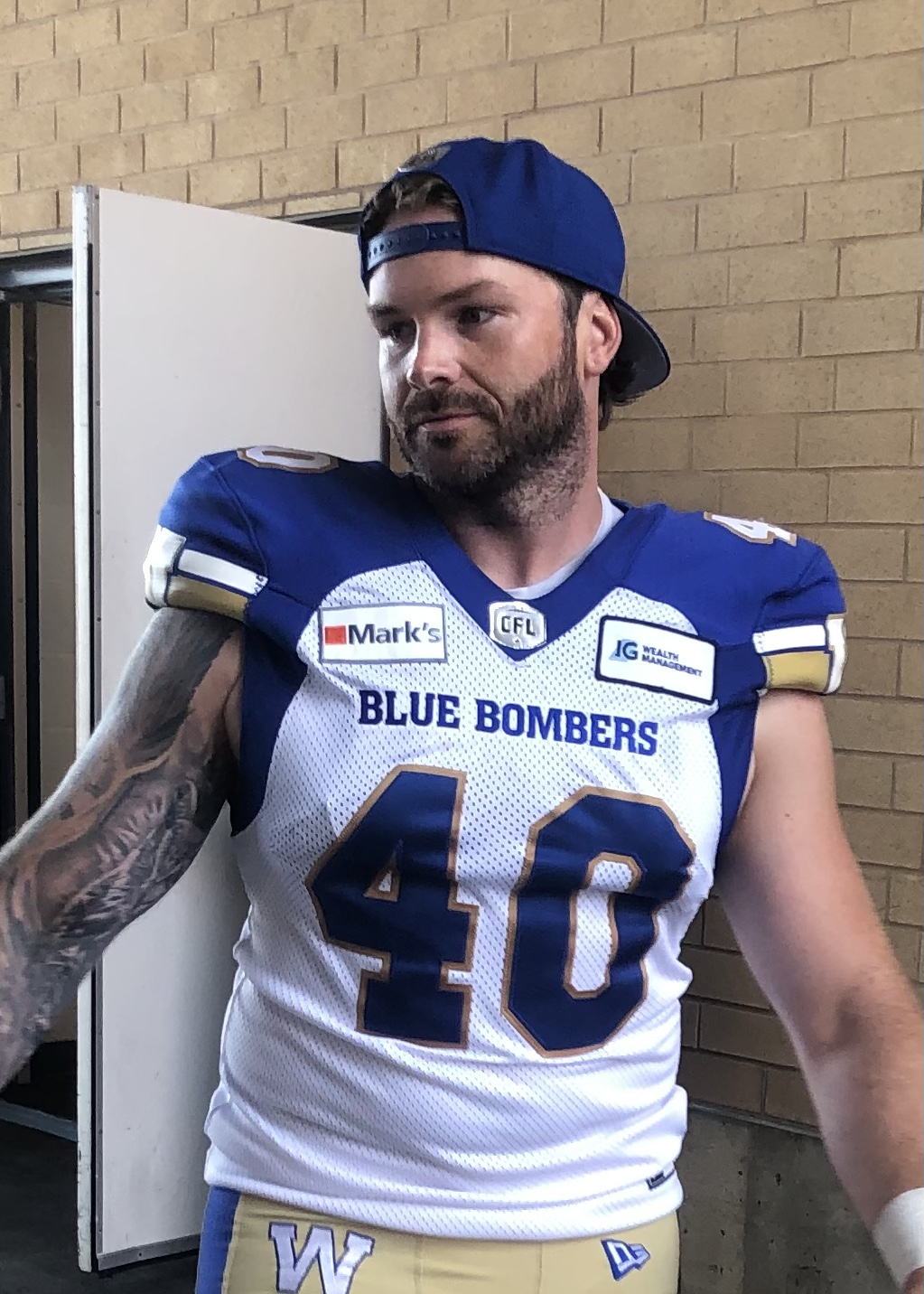
- Benson with the Winnipeg Blue Bombers in 2021

Saskatchewan Roughriders
- Position: Long snapper
- Roster status: Active
- CFL status: National

Personal information
- Born: May 13, 1987 (age 39); Winnipeg, Manitoba, Canada
- Listed height: 5 ft 10 in (1.78 m)
- Listed weight: 245 lb (111 kg)

Career information
- High school: Winnipeg (MB) St. Paul's
- CJFL: Winnipeg Rifles
- University: Acadia

Career history
- 2012–2013: Edmonton Eskimos
- 2014: Toronto Argonauts*
- 2014–2018: BC Lions
- 2019: Ottawa Redblacks
- 2020: Montreal Alouettes*
- 2021–2025: Winnipeg Blue Bombers
- 2026–present: Saskatchewan Roughriders
- * Offseason or practice squad member only

Awards and highlights
- Grey Cup champion (2021); CFL West All-Star (2026)
- Stats at CFL.ca

Mike Benson (born May 13, 1987) is a Canadian professional football long snapper for the Saskatchewan Roughriders of the Canadian Football League (CFL). He played CIS football for the Acadia Axemen and attended St. Paul's High School in Winnipeg. He has also been a member of the Edmonton Eskimos, Toronto Argonauts, BC Lions, Ottawa Redblacks, Montreal Alouettes, and Winnipeg Blue Bombers of the CFL.

== Professional career ==
=== Edmonton Eskimos ===
Benson was signed by the Edmonton Eskimos on June 11, 2012. He was released by the Eskimos on June 17, 2012. He signed with the Eskimos on October 18, 2012.

=== Toronto Argonauts ===
Benson signed with the Toronto Argonauts on June 1, 2014. He was released by the Argonauts on June 22, 2014.

=== BC Lions ===
Benson was signed by the BC Lions on August 31, 2014. During his fourth year as the Lions' long snapper, Benson recovered a muffed punt that he had snapped and which Edmonton wideout Brandon Zylstra failed to secure. Benson returned the ball for a touchdown against his former team. Benson received a one-year contract extension to remain with the Lions on January 11, 2018. He played in all 18 games in 2018, but was released from BC during the following off-season on May 1, 2019. During six years in the CFL and 84 games played, Benson had accumulated 16 tackles on special teams.

=== Ottawa Redblacks ===
Benson signed with the Ottawa Redblacks to a practice roster agreement on July 22, 2019. Benson was called up when Ottawa's regular long snapper Louis-Philippe Bourassa was suspended for two games. Benson also played the final three games of the season for Ottawa. He was released by the Redblacks on January 23, 2020.

=== Montreal Alouettes ===
On January 27, 2020, it was announced that Benson had signed a one-year contract with the Montreal Alouettes. However, the 2020 CFL season was cancelled and he did not play for the Alouettes.

=== Winnipeg Blue Bombers ===
Upon entering free agency, Benson signed with his hometown Winnipeg Blue Bombers on February 9, 2021. He played in all 14 regular season games and both post-season games in 2021 as he finished the season as a Grey Cup champion following the Blue Bombers' victory over the Hamilton Tiger-Cats in the 108th Grey Cup game. For the following three seasons, he played in every regular season and post season game, including the team's three straight Grey Cup losses.

In 2025, Benson was injured in the first game of the season and spent the following five games on the injured list. With his replacement, Ian Leroux, playing well, Benson was a healthy scratch for two games and then was ultimately released on August 12, 2025.

=== Saskatchewan Roughriders ===
On June 17, 2026, it was announced that Benson had signed with the Saskatchewan Roughriders.
