= 57th Vanier Cup =

2022 Canadian university football championship

Saskatchewan Huskies	Laval Rouge et Or
(7–1)	(7–1)
24	30
Head coach: Scott Flory	Head coach: Glen Constantin
	1	2	3	4	Total
Saskatchewan Huskies	3	14	0	7	24
Laval Rouge et Or	3	14	3	10	30
- Date: November 26, 2022
- Stadium: Western Alumni Stadium
- Location: London, Ontario
- Ted Morris Memorial Trophy: Kevin Mital
- Bruce Coulter Award: Charles-Alexandre Jacques
- Referee: Al Gates
- Halftime show: Delaney Jane
- Attendance: 8,420

Broadcasters
- Network: English: CBC Sports, French: TVA Sports
- Announcers: Mark Lee (play-by-play); Dashawn Stephens (analyst); Signa Butler (sideline reporter); Rob Pizzo (sideline reporter)

The 2022 Vanier Cup, the 57th edition of the U Sports Football Championship, took place on November 26, 2022 at Western Alumni Stadium in London, Ontario. The game determined the U Sports football national champion for the 2022 season.

The RSEQ champion Laval Rouge et Or defeated the Canada West champion Saskatchewan Huskies by a score of 30–24. The Rouge et Or won their U Sports-leading 11th Vanier Cup championship.

== Background ==
This was the first time that London had hosted the Vanier Cup game.

=== Semi-final games ===
The Vanier Cup is played between the champions of the Mitchell Bowl, and the Uteck Bowl, the national semi-final games.

The Québec conference Dunsmore Cup championship team, the Laval Rouge et Or defeated the Yates Cup Ontario championship team, the Western Mustangs, for the Mitchell Bowl. The winners of the Canada West Hardy Trophy, the Saskatchewan Huskies, defeated the Atlantic conference's Loney Bowl championship team, the St. Francis Xavier X-Men, for the Uteck Bowl. These games were played on November 19, 2022, and both of the visiting teams were victorious.

==== Bracket ====
November 19; Semi-finals; 19th Uteck Bowl; 20th Mitchell Bowl
St. Francis Xavier	19
Saskatchewan	36
Western	20
Laval	27

November 26; 57th Vanier Cup
Saskatchewan	24
Laval	30

== Teams ==
The Saskatchewan Huskies and Laval Rouge et Or played for the championship, following their victories in the bowl games. The Huskies were playing in their second straight Vanier Cup game and 11th overall, having won three championships in program history. The Rouge et Or were playing in their 13th championship game and won their 11th Vanier Cup. The two programs also played in 2004 and 2006 with both games also resulting in Laval victories.

== Scoring summary ==
First quarter

SSK – FG Solie 20 yards (6:27) 3–0 SSK
LAV – FG Blanchard 15 yards (1:54) 3–3

Second quarter

SSK – TD Iverson 3-yard pass from Nyhus (Solie convert) (13:45) 10–3 SSK
LAV – TD Muganda 3-yard run (Blanchard convert) (11:19) 10–10
LAV – Single Blanchard 85 yards (kickoff through the endzone) (11:19) 11–10 LAV
SSK – TD Vavra 3-yard pass from Nyhus (Solie convert) (8:35) 17–11 SSK
LAV – FG Blanchard 28 yards (6:15) 17–14 SSK
LAV – FG Blanchard 49 yards (0:01) 17–17

Third quarter

LAV – FG Blanchard 10 yards (3:25) 20–17 LAV

Fourth quarter

LAV – TD Dallaire 1-yard pass from Mital (Blanchard convert) (13:10) 27–17 LAV
SSK – TD Wiebe 3-yard pass from Nyhus (Solie convert) (4:58) 27–24 LAV
LAV – FG Blanchard 25 yards (1:56) 30–24 LAV
