= Jacques Chapdelaine =

Canadian football coach and former professional slotback

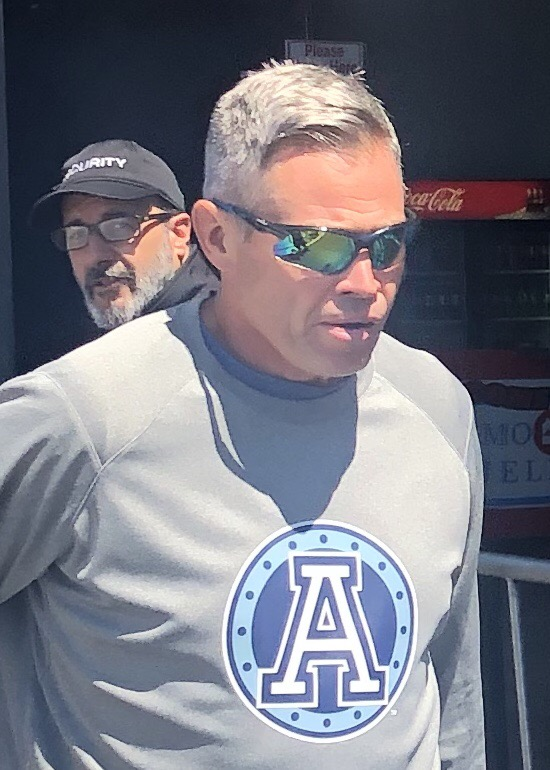
- Chapdelaine before an Argonauts game in 2019

Profile
- Positions: Offensive coordinator, QBC

Personal information
- Born: August 24, 1961 (age 65); Sherbrooke, Quebec, Canada

Career information
- University: Simon Fraser University
- CFL draft: 1983: 1st round, 5th overall pick

Career history

Playing
- 1983–1984: BC Lions
- 1985: Montreal Concordes
- 1986: Montreal Alouettes
- 1987–1989: Hamilton Tiger-Cats
- 1989: Calgary Stampeders

Coaching
- 1990–1991: Bishop's University (OC)
- 1992: Toronto Argonauts (ST & REC)
- 1993–1996: Bishop's University (OC)
- 1997–2000: Université Laval (HC)
- 2001: Calgary Stampeders (ST & REC)
- 2002: Calgary Stampeders (OC)
- 2003–2004: BC Lions (REC)
- 2005–2006: BC Lions (OC)
- 2007: Edmonton Eskimos (OC/Assistant HC)
- 2008–2009: BC Lions (REC)
- 2010–2013: BC Lions (OC)
- 2014: Simon Fraser University (HC)
- 2015: Saskatchewan Roughriders (OC)
- 2016: Montreal Alouettes (REC)
- 2016–2017: Montreal Alouettes (HC)
- 2019: Toronto Argonauts (OC/QB)

Awards and highlights
- 3× Grey Cup champion (2001, 2006, 2011); Vanier Cup champion (1999)

Jacques Chapdelaine (born August 24, 1961) is a Canadian professional football coach and former professional slotback in the Canadian Football League (CFL). He most recently served as the offensive coordinator and quarterbacks coach for the Toronto Argonauts of the CFL. He has also served as the offensive coordinator for four other CFL teams, the head coach of the Montreal Alouettes (2016-17), and the head coach for two Canadian university football teams. He has won three Grey Cup championships as an assistant coach and one Vanier Cup as the head coach of the Laval Rouge et Or. He played collegiately for the Simon Fraser Clan as a wide receiver and played between 1983 and 1989 for four different CFL teams.

== Playing career ==
Chapdelaine was drafted with the fifth pick of the first round in the 1983 CFL draft by the BC Lions. He had a productive first season with the Lions, recording 22 catches for 258 yards in 1983. Despite dressing in all 16 games in 1984, he caught only seven passes, leading to his trade to the Montreal Concordes during the following offseason. While his 1985 season with the Concordes was just as unproductive as the previous with the Lions, he posted career high totals with the re-branded Montreal Alouettes in 1986 with 53 receptions for 688 yards and his first career touchdown. The Alouettes franchise folded just before the 1987 season and Chapdelaine was selected in the dispersal draft by the Hamilton Tiger-Cats. He had two productive seasons in Hamilton, but fell out of favour in 1989, leading to his release in August of that year. He was signed by the Calgary Stampeders and played in one game before eventually retiring. Over the course of his career, he played in 94 games, recording 166 catches for 2,066 yards and six touchdowns.

== Coaching career ==
=== CIS coaching career ===
Chapdelaine began his coaching career in his hometown of Sherbrooke, Quebec with the Bishop's Gaiters as an assistant coach in 1990. After two years with Bishop's, he joined the Toronto Argonauts as their special teams coach. He returned to Bishop's in 1993 as their offensive coordinator and spent four years in that position. Following that successful stint, Chapdelaine was selected as the head coach for the Université Laval Rouge et Or football program in just its second year of existence in 1997. In the program's fourth year, Chapdelaine led the Rouge et Or to a victory in the 35th Vanier Cup in 1999, the first in school history. The Rouge et Or became the first francophone school to win the Vanier Cup. Laval also finished with an 8-0 record in the 2000 season, but they were upset at home by the Ottawa Gee-Gees in the Dunsmore Cup.

=== CFL coaching career ===
After a successful CIS football coaching career, Chapdelaine moved on to join the Calgary Stampeders as their Special teams coordinator and receivers coach in 2001. That year, the Stampeders won the 89th Grey Cup, thanks in part to a blocked punt return for a touchdown in the fourth quarter of the game. The next season, he was promoted to offensive coordinator, but the team struggled and Calgary's head coach Wally Buono was fired at season's end.

Buono was hired by the BC Lions in 2003 and Chapdelaine joined him there as their receivers coach. In 2005, Chapdelaine was promoted again to offensive coordinator and helped the Lions to a team record 11-0 start to the season, before losing five of their last six games and losing in the West Final. In the 2006 season, the Lions led the league in points scored, finished with a 13-5 record and won the 94th Grey Cup. Chapdelaine translated that success into a promotion with the Edmonton Eskimos as their assistant head coach and offensive coordinator in 2007. However, the Eskimos had an abysmal 5-12-1 season and Chapdelaine was fired at the end of the season.

He re-joined the BC Lions as their receivers coach in 2008, and resumed his offensive coordinator post in 2010. We won his third Grey Cup championship in 2011 as the Lions overcame an 0-5 start to that season to finish with an 11-7 record and west division title. The Lions posted another strong season offensively in 2012, but regressed in 2013 following an injury to starting quarterback Travis Lulay. At the conclusion of the 2013 season, the Lions and Chapdelaine agreed to part ways.

=== NCAA coaching career ===
On February 4, 2014, it was announced that Chapdelaine was hired as the head coach of the Simon Fraser Clan, marking a return to his alma mater and American football rules. The Clan finished with a 2-9 record (2-7 conference record) that year. Unexpectedly, Chapdelaine resigned on December 17, 2014 after the season to pursue other career opportunities.

=== Return to the CFL ===
==== Saskatchewan Roughriders ====
Following his resignation from SFU, Chapdelaine joined the Saskatchewan Roughriders as their offensive coordinator on December 19, 2014. The Roughriders sustained an injury to starting quarterback Darian Durant and struggled all year, finishing dead last in the CFL with a 3-15 record. Nonetheless, the team finished third overall in total offense with 6,442 yards and led the league in rushing yards with 2,150 on the ground. Following the disappointing season, the Roughriders' management fired all of the coaching staff and new head coach, Chris Jones, brought in his staff from Edmonton.

==== Montreal Alouettes ====
Chapdelaine was hired by the Montreal Alouettes on February 8, 2016 as their receivers coach and special advisor to the offensive coordinator, Anthony Calvillo, who was entering his first full season in that role. With the team mired in an offensive slump and enduring a 3-9 record, head coach Jim Popp stepped down and promoted Chapdelaine to head coach on September 19, 2016 during the team's bye week. Chapdelaine is the first francophone head coach in the 62-year history of the Montreal Alouettes franchise. He earned his first win in his first game as head coach against the Toronto Argonauts in front of the first sellout crowd in Montreal since 2010. He finished the 2016 season with a record of 4-2, including wins in the last three games of the regular season.

Despite front office changes and a new general manager, on December 14, 2016, the Alouettes announced that Chapdelaine would remain as their head coach for the 2017 season. After compiling a record of 3-8 during the 2017 season, Chapdelaine was fired on Sept. 13, 2017.

==== Toronto Argonauts ====
Chapdelaine was announced as the Toronto Argonauts' new offensive coordinator and quarterbacks coach for the 2019 CFL season on February 7, 2019. He was not retained as a member of the 2020 staff.

== Head coaching record ==
=== CFL ===
Team	Year	Regular season					Postseason		
Team	Year	Won	Lost	Ties	Win %	Finish	Won	Lost	Result
MTL	2016	4	2	0	.667	3rd in East Division	0	0	Did not qualify
MTL	2017	3	8	0	.273	Fired	0	0	
Total		7	10	0	.412		0	0	

=== College ===
Year	Team	Overall	Conference	Standing	Bowl/playoffs
Simon Fraser Clan (Great Northwest Athletic Conference) (2014)
2014	Simon Fraser	2–9	2–4	5th	
Simon Fraser:		2–9	2–4		
Total:		2–9			

== Personal ==
His eldest son, Matt Chapdelaine, played as a wide receiver for the Alberta Golden Bears before transferring to Simon Fraser University. Matt was drafted in the sixth round, 46th overall in the 2010 CFL draft by the BC Lions. His younger son, Justin Chapdelaine, played quarterback and receiver for the Queen's Golden Gaels and was an offensive assistant with Jacques in Saskatchewan in 2015.
