= 39th Vanier Cup =

2003 Canadian university football championship

Laval Rouge et Or	Saint Mary's Huskies
(7–1)	(7–1)
14	7
Head coach: Glen Constantin	Head coach: Blake Nill
	1	2	3	4	Total
Laval Rouge et Or	3	2	7	2	14
Saint Mary's Huskies	2	0	0	5	7
- Date: November 22, 2003
- Stadium: SkyDome
- Location: Toronto
- Ted Morris Memorial Trophy: Jeronimo Huerta-Flores, Laval
- Bruce Coulter Award: Philippe Audet, Laval
- Attendance: 17,828

Broadcasters
- Network: The Score/The Score HD

The 39th Vanier Cup was played on November 22, 2003, at the SkyDome in Toronto, Ontario, and decided the CIS Football champion for the 2003 season. The Laval Rouge et Or won their second ever national championship by defeating the Saint Mary's Huskies by a score of 14–7, denying the Huskies a third consecutive Vanier Cup victory.
