= Telus Stadium =

Laval University stadium in Québec City, Québec

Stade TELUS-Université Laval
- PEPS Le Stade Extérieur
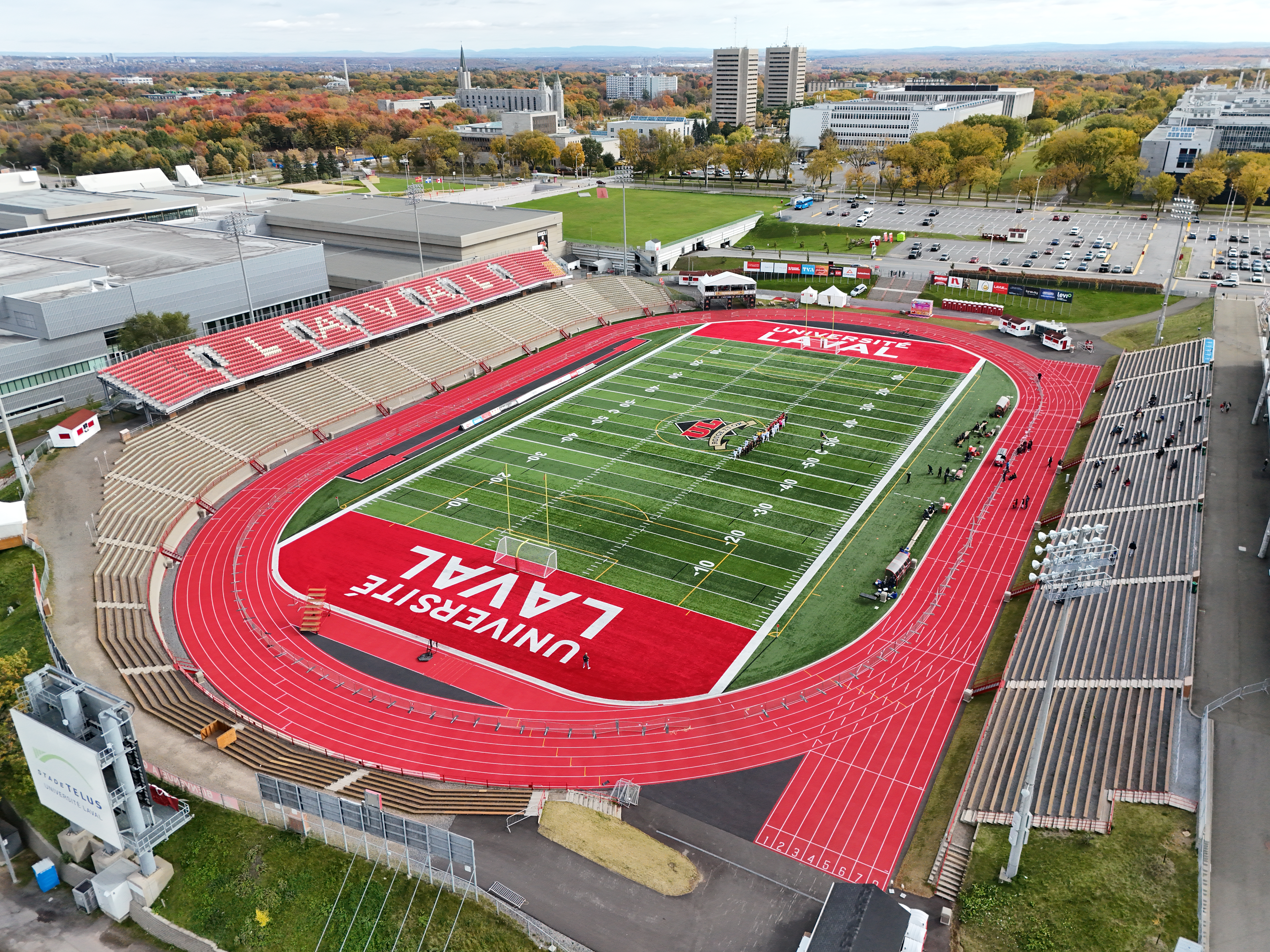
- Interactive map of Stade TELUS-Université Laval
- Location: Rue Du PEPS; Quebec City, Canada
- Coordinates: 46°47′06″N 71°16′37″W
- Owner: Université Laval
- Operator: Université Laval
- Capacity: 10,200 (1994–2009); 12,257 (2009–2010); 12,750 (2010–present) (with standing room at least 20,000)
- Record attendance: 21,399 (October 19, 2025)

Construction
- Opened: 1994

Tenant
- Laval Rouge et Or

Telus Stadium or Stade TELUS-Université Laval is an outdoor stadium that is home of the Laval Rouge et Or of U Sports football. It has a 12,750-seat capacity and is used for Canadian football and soccer. It was built in 1994 on the PEPS sports complex at Université Laval. Approximately 2,000 seats were added to the stadium in preparation for the two events, which were the 45th and 46th Vanier Cup games, bringing seated capacity up to 12,257 from the previous 10,200.

In June 2003, a Canadian Football League exhibition game between the Montreal Alouettes and the Ottawa Renegades was held at PEPS. In December 2008, Canadian Interuniversity Sport awarded the 2009 and 2010 Vanier Cup to Quebec City. The 2009 title game was sold out, with 18,628 fans in the stands including standing room. Attendance at the 2010 Vanier Cup was over 16,000. Subsequent championship games were awarded to Laval in 2013, 2015, 2018, and 2019.

On October 20, 2019, a record 19,381 fans attended the Rouge et Or game against the Montreal Carabins as the program celebrated their 25th anniversary. This record was later broken on October 19, 2025, when the Rouge et Or hosted the Carabins and 21,399 fans attended the game.

== Vanier Cup games ==
| Game | Date | Winning team | Score | Opponent | Attendance |
|---|---|---|---|---|---|
| 45th | November 28, 2009 | Queen's Gaels | 33–31 | Calgary Dinos | 18,628 |
| 46th | November 27, 2010 | Laval Rouge et Or | 29–2 | Calgary Dinos | 16,237 |
| 49th | November 23, 2013 | Laval Rouge et Or | 25–14 | Calgary Dinos | 18,543 |
| 51st | November 28, 2015 | UBC Thunderbirds | 26–23 | Montreal Carabins | 12,557 |
| 54th | November 24, 2018 | Laval Rouge et Or | 34–20 | Western Mustangs | 12,380 |
| 55th | November 23, 2019 | Calgary Dinos | 27–13 | Montreal Carabins | 8,376 |
| 56th | December 4, 2021 | Western Mustangs | 27–21 | Saskatchewan Huskies | 5,840 |
| 61st | November 28, 2026 | | | | |
| 62nd | November 27, 2027 | | | | |

== Professional Canadian football ==
| Game type | Date | Winning team | Score | Opponent | Attendance |
|---|---|---|---|---|---|
| Preseason | June 7, 2003 | Montreal Alouettes | 54–23 | Ottawa Renegades | 10,358 |
| Preseason | June 13, 2015 | Montreal Alouettes | 26–9 | Ottawa Redblacks | 4,778 |
