= 42nd Vanier Cup =

2006 Canadian university football championship

Laval Rouge et Or	Saskatchewan Huskies
(7–1)	(6–2)
13	8
Head coach: Glen Constantin	Head coach: Brian Towriss
	1	2	3	4	Total
Laval Rouge et Or	0	10	0	3	13
Saskatchewan Huskies	0	2	0	6	8
- Date: November 25, 2006
- Stadium: Griffiths Stadium
- Location: Saskatoon
- Ted Morris Memorial Trophy: Éric Maranda, Laval LB
- Bruce Coulter Award: Samuel Grégoire-Champagne, Laval WR
- Attendance: 12,567

Broadcasters
- Network: The Score/The Score HD

The 42nd Vanier Cup was played on November 25, 2006, at Griffiths Stadium in Saskatoon, Saskatchewan, and decided the CIS Football champion for the 2006 season. The hometown Saskatchewan Huskies lost their CIS record third straight Vanier Cup to the Laval Rouge et Or by a score of 13–8. Laval became the second team in CIS history to win three championships over a four-year period after the Western Ontario Mustangs won in 1974, 1976, and 1977.

== Game summary ==
Laval Rouge et Or (13) - TDs, Guillaume Allard-Caméus; FGs, Cameron Takacs (2); cons., Cameron Takacs (1).

Saskatchewan Huskies (8) - TDs, Tyler O'Gorman; safety touch (1).

=== Scoring summary ===
First Quarter
No Scoring

Second Quarter
LAV - FG Takacs 26 (6:03)
SSK - Team Safety (12:09)
LAV - TD Allard-Caméus 1 rush (Takacs kick) (13:49)

Third Quarter
No Scoring

Fourth Quarter
SSK - TD O'Gorman 3 rush (Two-point convert failed) (14:10)
LAV - FG Takacs 26 (14:16)

=== Notable game facts ===
- Not only was this the first Vanier Cup game to be played in Saskatoon, it was also the first Vanier Cup to be played in Western Canada
- The Rouge et Or gained a measure of revenge over the Huskies after they defeated them in the previous years' Mitchell Bowl, in Saskatoon, by a score of 29–27. Laval had been vying to become the first CIS team to three-peat as Vanier Cup Champions.
- The two teams first met in the 40th Vanier Cup, where Laval won a similar low-scoring affair 7–1.
- The Laval victory over Saskatchewan in Saskatoon ended an impressive 16 playoff games streak where a Canada West team won against the visiting team when playing on home turf. The previous victory by a visiting team in Western Canada happened in the 1968 Churchill Bowl, in Winnipeg (Queen's 29 - Manitoba 6).
