= 49th Vanier Cup =

2013 Canadian university football championship

Calgary Dinos	Laval Rouge et Or
(11–0)	(11–0)
14	25
Head coach: Blake Nill	Head coach: Glen Constantin
	1	2	3	4	Total
Calgary Dinos	0	0	14	0	14
Laval Rouge et Or	1	5	9	10	25
- Date: November 23, 2013
- Stadium: TELUS-Université Laval Stadium
- Location: Quebec City, Quebec
- Ted Morris Memorial Trophy: Pascal Lochard, Laval
- Bruce Coulter Award: Vincent Desloges, Laval
- Referee: Greg MacLean
- Attendance: 18,543

Broadcasters
- Network: TV: Sportsnet, Ici Radio-Canada Télé

The 2013 Vanier Cup, the 49th edition of the Canadian university football championship, took place on Saturday, November 23, 2013 at TELUS-Université Laval Stadium in Quebec City, Quebec. This was the third time in five years that Université Laval hosted the Vanier Cup. For the previous two years, the game had been held in conjunction with the Canadian Football League's championship, the Grey Cup, but due to logistical issues by this year's host, Regina, a joint venture was not possible.

== Game summary ==
=== Scoring summary ===
First Quarter
LAV - Single Bede missed 30-yard field goal attempt (3:03)

Second Quarter
LAV - FG Bede 19 (7:56)
LAV - Team Safety (12:42)

Third Quarter
LAV - FG Bede 10 (4:16)
CGY - Harty 6 run (Mark converts) (7:59)
LAV - FG Bede 16 (12:39)
CGY - Dobko 6 pass from Buckley (Mark converts) (13:43)
LAV - FG Bede 36 (15:00)

Fourth Quarter
LAV - TD Lochard 8 run (Bede converts) (9:12)
LAV - FG Bede 12 (14:03)
