= 35th Vanier Cup =

1999 Canadian university football championship

Laval Rouge et Or	Saint Mary's Huskies
(6–2)	(7–1)
14	10
Head coach: Jacques Chapdelaine	Head coach: Blake Nill
	1	2	3	4	Total
Laval Rouge et Or	7	7	0	0	14
Saint Mary's Huskies	0	10	0	0	10
- Date: November 27, 1999
- Stadium: SkyDome
- Location: Toronto
- Ted Morris Memorial Trophy: Stéphane Lefebvre, Laval
- Bruce Coulter Award: Francesco Pete-Esposito, Laval
- Attendance: 12,595

Broadcasters
- Network: The Score/The Score HD

The 35th Vanier Cup was played on November 27, 1999, at the SkyDome in Toronto, Ontario, and decided the CIAU football champion for the 1999 season. The Laval Rouge et Or won the first championship in school history by defeating the Saint Mary's Huskies by a score of 14–10.

== Game summary ==
Laval Rouge et Or (14) - TDs, Lefebvre (2); cons., Gagne (2).

Saint Mary's Huskies (10) - TDs, Perez; FGs Currie; cons., Currie.
