= 40th Vanier Cup =

2004 Canadian university football championship

Laval Rouge et Or	Saskatchewan Huskies
(7–1)	(6–2)
7	1
Head coach: Glen Constantin	Head coach: Brian Towriss
	1	2	3	4	Total
Laval Rouge et Or	0	0	3	4	7
Saskatchewan Huskies	1	0	0	0	1
- Date: November 27, 2004
- Stadium: Ivor Wynne Stadium
- Location: Hamilton
- Ted Morris Memorial Trophy: Matthew Leblanc, Laval WR/K
- Bruce Coulter Award: Matthieu Proulx, Laval DB
- Attendance: 14,227

Broadcasters
- Network: The Score/The Score HD

The 40th Vanier Cup was played on November 27, 2004, at Ivor Wynne Stadium in Hamilton, Ontario, and decided the CIS Football champion for the 2004 season. In the first Vanier Cup to be played outside Toronto, the Laval Rouge et Or repeated as champions by defeating the Saskatchewan Huskies by a score of 7-1. The turnover-filled game was the lowest scoring Vanier Cup in the game's history.

== Game summary ==
Laval Rouge et Or (7) - FGs Matthew Leblanc (1); singles, Matthew Leblanc, Jeronimo Huerta-Flores (1); safety touch (1).

Saskatchewan Huskies (1) - singles, Brad Ollen (1).

=== Scoring summary ===
First Quarter
SSK - Single Ollen (7:04)

Second Quarter
No Scoring

Third Quarter
LAV - FG Leblanc 12 (12:09)

Fourth Quarter
LAV - Single Leblanc missed 16 yard field goal attempt (5:09)
LAV - Team Safety (9:10)
LAV - Single Huerta-Flores (14:26)

=== Notable game facts ===
- Laval Rouge et Or became the fourth school to repeat as champions with the Saint Mary's Huskies accomplishing the feat right before Laval in 2001 and 2002. Most impressive is that Laval did not give up a touchdown during those two consecutive national title games.
- Wide receiver and placekicker Matthew Leblanc was named game MVP after scoring four of the team's seven points, catching three passes for 38 yards and recording one rush for 31 yards. Leblanc was filling in at place-kicking duties after injuries to kicker Rob McCallum (early season) and QB/K Stephan Larosilière (the previous week).
- Saskatchewan quarterback Steve Bilan completed 11 of 33 pass attempts for 113 yards and five interceptions, two of which went to defensive MVP Matthieu Proulx.
- The five interceptions by Laval tied a Vanier Cup record. Saskatchewan's Brent Schneider also threw five picks in a 50-40 loss to Western in 1994.
- It was the first time in history that no touchdown was scored in the Vanier Cup game.
