= 59th Vanier Cup =

2024 Canadian university football championship

| Laval | Laurier |
|---|---|
| (7–1) | (8–0) |
| 22 | 17 |
| Head coach: Glen Constantin | Head coach: Michael Faulds |
| | 1 | 2 | 3 | 4 | Total |
|---|---|---|---|---|---|
| Laval | 6 | 11 | 0 | 5 | 22 |
| Laurier | 0 | 7 | 7 | 3 | 17 |
- Date: November 23, 2024
- Stadium: Richardson Memorial Stadium
- Location: Kingston, Ontario
- Ted Morris Memorial Trophy: Felipe Forteza
- Bruce Coulter Award: Arnaud Desjardins
- Attendance: 9,512

Broadcasters
- Network: English: CBC Sports, French: TVA Sports
- Announcers: Mark Lee (play-by-play); Dashawn Stephens (analyst); Signa Butler (sideline reporter)

The 2024 Vanier Cup was the 59th edition of the Canadian university football championship, held on November 23, 2024, at Richardson Memorial Stadium in Kingston, Ontario. It took place between the Uteck Bowl champions, the Laurier Golden Hawks and the Mitchell Bowl champions, the Laval Rouge et Or.

== Host ==
This was the second time that Kingston hosted the Vanier Cup with the first being in the previous year with the 58th Vanier Cup game. However, it was the fourth time that the school has hosted the university final, with the others taking place in 1920 and 1929.

== Semi-Championships ==
The Vanier Cup is played between the champions of the Mitchell Bowl, the Laval Rouge et Or and the Uteck Bowl, the Wilfrid Laurier Golden Hawks the national semi-final games. The week before, the Québec conference Dunsmore Cup championship team, the Laval Rouge et Or visited the winners of the Canada West Hardy Trophy, the Regina Rams for the Mitchell Bowl and defeated them. The Yates Cup Ontario Conference championship team visited the Atlantic conference's Loney Bowl championship team, the Bishop's Gaiters for the Uteck Bowl, and defeated them.

== Background ==
=== Semi-final games ===
As part of the rotating schedule, the Québec conference Dunsmore Cup championship team, the Laval Rouge et Or visited the winners of the Canada West Hardy Trophy, the Regina Rams for the Mitchell Bowl where they won 17–14. The Yates Cup Ontario Conference champions, the Wilfrid Laurier Golden Hawks, visited the Atlantic conference's Loney Bowl championship team, the Bishop's Gaiters for the Uteck Bowl, and won 48–24. These games were played on November 16, 2024.

==== Bracket ====
November 16th Semi-finals
21st Uteck Bowl – Lennoxville, QC
Laurier | 48
Bishop's | 24
22nd Mitchell Bowl – Regina, SK
Regina | 14
Laval | 17

November 23rd Final
59th Vanier Cup – Kingston, ON
Laurier | 17
Laval | 22

== Teams ==
The championship game featured Wilfrid Laurier from Ontario University Athletics and Laval from the RSEQ Conference. The Golden Hawks last appeared in the 41st Vanier Cup and had a 2–3 record in the Cup, while the Rouge et Or made their second appearance in three years and were 11–2 in the Vanier Cup. The Rouge et Or and Golden Hawks have met twice previously, both times in the Uteck Bowl in Quebec City, in 2004 and 2016, where Laval won both matchups.

=== Lineups ===
| Laval | Position | Laurier | Position |
|---|---|---|---|
| Francis Bouchard | DB | Tanner Nelmes | RB |
| Mathieu Roy | RB | Ryan Hughes | WR |
| Christopher St-Hilaire | LB | Ethan Jordan | WR |
| Angel Vital | RB | Harnoor Dhaliwal | DB |
| Anton Haie | DB | Jacob Bennett | WR |
| Jordan Lessard | CB | Titan Gaudun | WR |
| Justin Cloutier | LB | Paul Loggale | DB |
| Victor Charland | QB | Valentine Adedeji | DB |
| Arnaud Desjardins | QB | Jaxon Stebbings | WR |
| Arnaud Laporte | DB | Layomi Ojutalayo | WR |
| Emmanuel Awuni | DB | Isaac Willis | QB |
| Nathan Lacasse | WR | Taylor Elgersma | QB |
| Philippe Champagne | DB | Raidan Thorne | WR |
| Vincent Delisle | S | Tristan Miller | DB |
| Ndéki Garant-Doumambila | DB | Dawson Hodge | bg |
| Emil Barthélémy | CB | Tayshaun Jackson | RB |
| Xavier Thibaudeau | DB | Isaiah Obiorah | DB |
| Benjamin Nadon | S | Johari Hastings | DB |
| Alex Duff | RB/MLB | Ethan Bayfield | DB |
| Jonas Billy | DB | Owen Goetz | DB |
| William Tremblay | FB | Maliek Cote | DB |
| François Giguère-Lacasse | FB | Lewc Rayner | RB |
| Felipe Forteza | K | Jayden Griffiths | LB |
| Olivier Ruest | LB | Maleek Russell | LB |
| Étienne Delisle | LB | Sebastian Parsalidis | RB |
| Antoine Guay-Tanguay | LB | Khalil Derman | RB |
| Meekaël Désir | DE | Max Harris | OL |
| Ian Leroux | LB | Jessie Wilkins-Flaricee | LB |
| Loic Brodeur | DE | Marcus Tenney | DL |
| Natan Charron | DE | Jason MacGougan | LS |
| William Quenneville | DE | Ethan Gregorcic | LB |
| Simon Roy | OL | Tyler Potvin | OL |
| Étienne Cloutier | LB | Matteo Laquintana | DL |
| Alexendre Masri-Fliss | OL | Ethan Rabiner | LB |
| Jean-Antoine Dean-Rios | OL | Spencer Walsh | OL |
| Samuel Quevillon | OL | Lambert Pomerleau | OL |
| Maxime-Olivier Cabana | OL | Kodi Blackshaw | OL |
| Jean-Christophe Vibert | OL | Tanner Elson | OL |
| Isaac Gaillardetz | WR | Josh Rietveld | OL |
| Olivier Cool | WR | Cooper Hamilton | OL |
| Guillaume Cauchon | WR | Chisanem Nsitem | DL |
| Édouard Arsenault | WR | Anthony Briscoe | REC |
| Émeric Boutin | FB | Jace Atkinson | REC |
| Andrew Menzies | WR | Ryan Speight | REC |
| Simon Potvin | WR | Geri Theodore | DL |
| Thomas Gosselin | DT | Andre Bute | DL |
| Christophe Lévesque | OL | Matt Caruso | DL |
| Yoann Miangué | DT | Omari Hastings | DL |
