= 54th Vanier Cup =

2018 Canadian university football championship

Laval Rouge et Or	Western Mustangs
(12–0)	(11–1)
34	20
Head coach: Glen Constantin	Head coach: Greg Marshall
	1	2	3	4	Total
Laval Rouge et Or	10	7	10	7	34
Western Mustangs	0	13	0	7	20
- Date: November 24, 2018
- Stadium: Telus Stadium
- Location: Quebec City, QC
- Ted Morris Memorial Trophy: Hugo Richard, Laval
- Bruce Coulter Award: Adam Auclair, Laval
- Coin toss: Western
- Referee: Walter Berry
- Attendance: 12,380

Broadcasters
- Network: TV: Sportsnet, TVA Sports

The 2018 Vanier Cup, the 54th edition of the Canadian university football championship, took place on November 24, 2018, at Telus Stadium in Quebec City, Quebec. This game is a rematch of the 53rd Vanier Cup, with the defending champion Western Mustangs and Laval Rouge et Or making 14th and 12th appearances in the national title game overall. Both programs have not only made the most appearances in the game (ranking first and second), but they also have the most wins, with Laval having won nine Vanier Cups and Western having won seven.

This was the fifth time that Quebec City hosted the Vanier Cup and the first time since 2015.

== Semi-Championships ==
The Vanier Cup is played between the champions of the Mitchell Bowl and the Uteck Bowl, the national semi-final games. In 2018, according to the rotating schedule, the Canada West Hardy Trophy championship team, Saskatchewan Huskies, visited the Yates Cup Ontario championship team, the Western Mustangs for the Mitchell Bowl. The winners of the Atlantic conference's Loney Bowl, St. Francis Xavier X-Men, visited the Québec conference Dunsmore Cup championship team, Laval Rouge et Or, for the Uteck Bowl.
