= Laval Rouge et Or =

Sports teams of Université Laval

Rouge et Or
- University: Université Laval
- Association: U Sports
- Conference: RSEQ
- Athletic director: Julie Dionne
- Location: Quebec City, Quebec
- Football stadium: Stade PEPS (football, soccer)
- Mascot: Victor
- Nickname: Rouge et Or
- Colours: Red, Gold, and Black
- Website: rougeetor.ulaval.ca

The Laval Rouge et Or (French: Rouge-et-Or de Laval; French: [ʁuʒ e ɔʁ], Red and Gold) are the athletic teams that represent Université Laval, located in Quebec City, Quebec. Home games are all held in the PEPS indoor and outdoor sports facilities.

== Varsity teams ==
Laval Rouge et Or teams compete in:

| Men's sports | Women's sports |
|---|---|
| Basketball | Basketball |
| Football | Flag football |
| Soccer | Ice hockey |
| Volleyball | Rugby |
| | Soccer |
| | Volleyball |
Co-ed sports
Badminton
Cross country
Golf
Swimming
Tennis
Track and field

=== Football ===
The Laval Rouge et Or football team began its first regular season in 1996 and has quickly become one of the most successful programs in U Sports history. The Rouge et Or have won a record twelve Vanier Cup championships and their most recent victory occurred at the 59th Vanier Cup in 2024. They are also the only program to have played in four straight Vanier Cups. The team has also won the Dunsmore Cup 15 times since 1999, demonstrating their historical dominance in their conference.

== Former teams ==
=== Men's ice hockey ===
Laval's first team was fielded immediately after World War II, playing a handful of games in the Senior Intercollegiate League (SIL). The circuit included four teams that were outside the Canadian Intercollegiate Athletic Union (CIAU), the main conference for Canadian college hockey. Unfortunately, the league did not prove to be successful and was abandoned after just one year. Five years later, Laval returned to the ice as a member of the CIAU, joining its former sister school, Montreal.

The program proved to be too costly for the university to continue to operate and the team was shuttered after a 2nd-place finish in 1983.
