= Calgary Dinos football =

University of Calgary sports team

Calgary Dinos
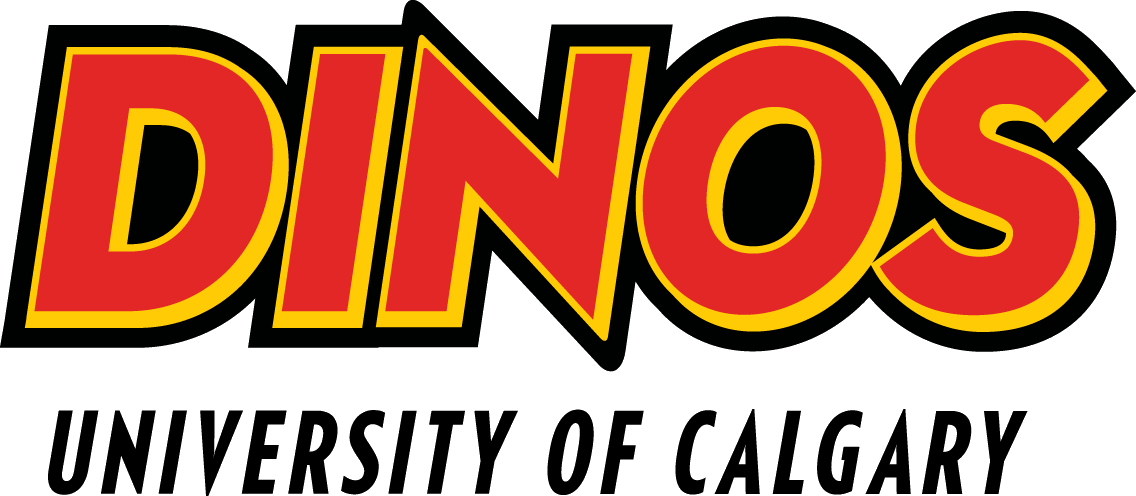
- Calgary Dinos logo
- First season: 1964; 62 years ago
- Athletic director: Ben Matchett
- Head coach: Ryan Sheahan; 3rd year, 8–16 (.333)
- Other staff: Jabari Arthur (OC)
- Home stadium: McMahon Stadium
- Year built: 1960
- Stadium capacity: 35,650 (18,325 open for Dinos games)
- Stadium surface: FieldTurf
- Location: Calgary, Alberta
- League: U Sports
- Conference: Canada West
- All-time record: 250–172–4 (.592)
- Postseason record: 34–22 (.607)

Titles
- Vanier Cups: 5; 1983, 1985, 1988, 1995, 2019
- Uteck Bowls: 2; 2009, 2010
- Mitchell Bowls: 3; 2013, 2016, 2019
- Churchill Bowls: 3; 1985, 1988, 1995
- Atlantic Bowls: 3; 1975, 1983, 1993
- Hardy Cups: 18; 1975, 1977, 1983, 1984, 1985, 1988, 1992, 1993, 1995, 2008, 2009, 2010, 2011, 2012, 2013, 2016, 2017, 2019
- Hec Crighton winners: 6 Greg Vavra, Don Blair, Erik Glavic, Andrew Buckley (x2), Adam Sinagra

Current uniform
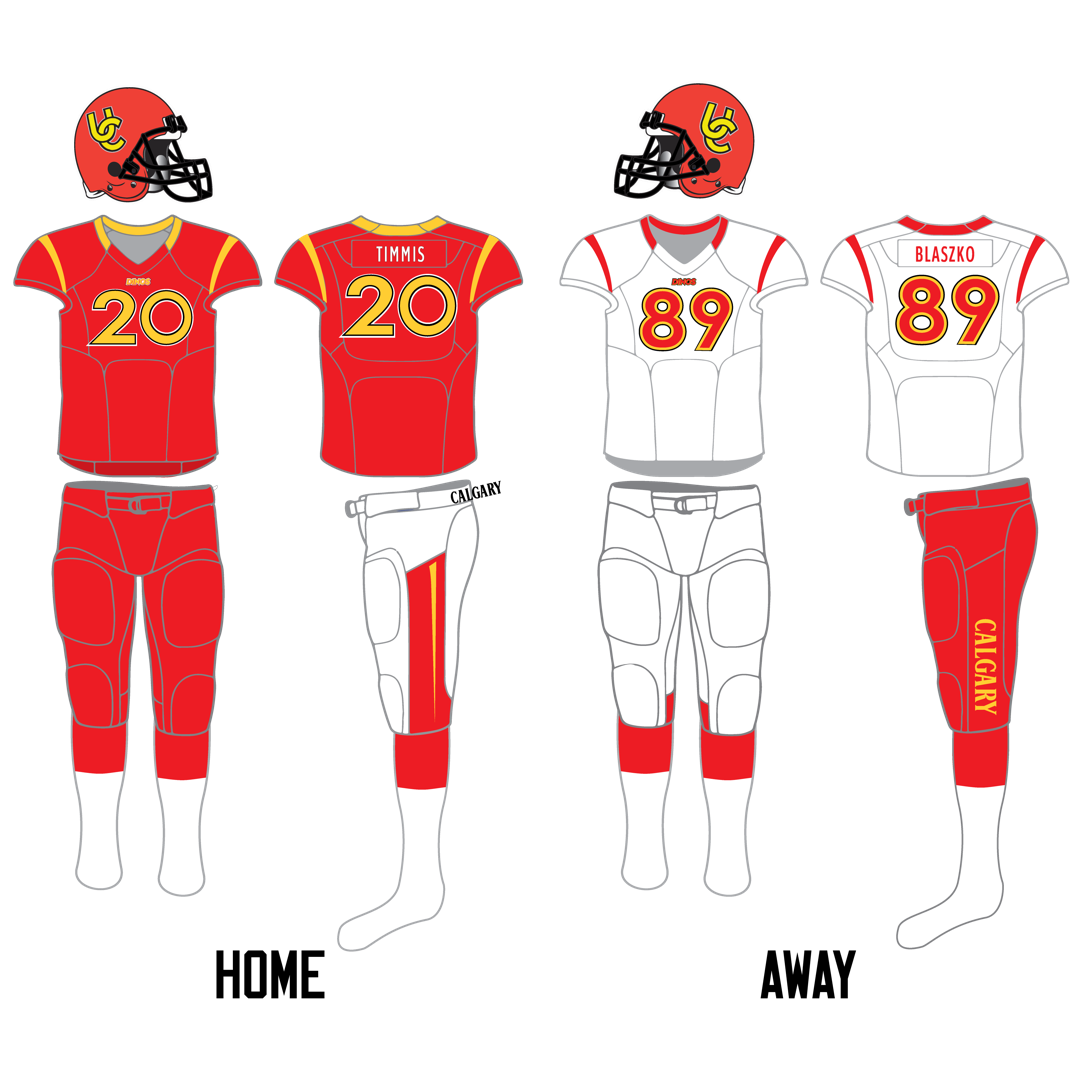
- Colours: Red, Gold, and Black
- Outfitter: Nike
- Rivals: Alberta Golden Bears; Saskatchewan Huskies
- Website: godinos.com/football

The Calgary Dinos football team represents the University of Calgary in the sport of Canadian football in U Sports. The Dinos program has been in operation since 1964, winning the Vanier Cup national championship five times (1983, 1985, 1988, 1995, 2019), the most out of any of the Canada West teams. The Dinos have also won the Hardy Trophy conference championship 18 times, including six consecutive wins from 2008 to 2013. The team appeared in the 2013 and 2016 Vanier Cup, but lost both years to the Laval Rouge et Or.

== Recent regular season results ==
Season	Games	Won	Lost	OTL	PCT	PF	PA	Standing	Playoffs
2000	8	6	2	0	0.750	247	159	2nd in CW	Lost to Regina Rams in semi-final 33–32
2001	8	3	5	0	0.375	130	260	4th in CW	Lost to Manitoba Bisons in semi-final 31–10
2002	8	5	2	1	0.688	195	215	2nd in CW	Lost to Regina Rams in semi-final 39–17
2003	8	4	4	0	0.500	187	237	5th in CW	Out of Playoffs
2004	8	4	4	0	0.500	147	189	4th in CW	Lost to Alberta Golden Bears in semi-final 39–13
2005	8	2	6	0	0.250	149	259	6th in CW	Out of Playoffs
2006	8	2	6	0	0.250	133	221	6th in CW	Out of Playoffs
2007	8	4	4	–	0.500	234	180	4th in CW	Lost to Manitoba Bisons in semi-final 27–5
2008	8	5	3	–	0.625	146	127	2nd in CW	Defeated Regina Rams in semi-final 24–17; Defeated Simon Fraser Clan in Hardy Cup 44–21; Lost to Laval Rouge et Or in Uteck Bowl 59–10
2009	8	7	1	–	0.875	316	172	2nd in CW	Defeated Alberta Golden Bears in semi-final 45–13; Defeated Saskatchewan Huskies in Hardy Cup 39–38; Defeated Saint Mary's Huskies in Uteck Bowl 38–14; Lost to Queen's Golden Gaels in 45th Vanier Cup 33–31
2010	8	6	2	–	0.750	208	178	2nd in CW	Defeated Regina Rams in semi-final 40–33; Defeated Alberta Golden Bears in Hardy Cup 56–3; Defeated Saint Mary's Huskies in Mitchell Bowl 35–8; Lost to Laval Rouge et Or in 46th Vanier Cup 29–2
2011	8	7	1	–	0.875	299	156	1st in CW	Defeated Regina Rams in semi-final 16–4; Defeated UBC Thunderbirds in Hardy Cup 62–13; Lost to Laval Rouge et Or in Mitchell Bowl 41–10
2012	8	7	1	–	0.875	380	117	1st in CW	Defeated Manitoba Bisons in semi-final 56–18; Defeated Regina Rams in Hardy Cup 38–14; Lost to McMaster Marauders in Mitchell Bowl 45–6
2013	8	8	0	–	1.000	339	183	1st in CW	Defeated UBC Thunderbirds in semi-final 42–28; Defeated Manitoba Bisons in Hardy Cup 43–28; Defeated Western Mustangs in Mitchell Bowl 44–3; Lost to Laval Rouge et Or in 49th Vanier Cup 25–14
2014	8	6	2	–	0.750	419	179	1st in CW	Defeated Regina Rams in semi-final 56–0; Lost to Manitoba Bisons in Hardy Cup 27–15
2015	8	8	0	–	1.000	471	149	1st in CW	Lost to UBC Thunderbirds in semi-final 34–26
2016	8	6	2	–	0.750	277	218	2nd in CW	Defeated Saskatchewan Huskies in semi-final 47–17; Defeated UBC Thunderbirds in Hardy Cup 46–43; Defeated St. Francis Xavier X-Men in Mitchell Bowl 50–24; Lost to Laval Rouge et Or in 52nd Vanier Cup 31–26
2017	8	7	1	–	0.875	340	224	1st in CW	Defeated Alberta Golden Bears in semi-final 39–22; Defeated UBC Thunderbirds in Hardy Cup 44–43; Lost to Laval Rouge et Or in Mitchell Bowl 35–23
2018	8	8	0	–	1.000	313	133	1st in CW	Defeated Manitoba Bisons in semi-final 37–13; Lost to Saskatchewan Huskies in Hardy Cup 43–18
2019	8	6	2	–	0.750	246	166	1st in CW	Defeated Manitoba Bisons in semi-final 47–46; Defeated Saskatchewan Huskies in Hardy Cup 29–4; Defeated McMaster Marauders in Mitchell Bowl 30–17; Defeated Montreal Carabins in 55th Vanier Cup 27–13
2020	Season cancelled due to COVID-19 pandemic								
2021	6	2	4	–	0.333	181	163	5th in CW	Out of Playoffs
2022	8	1	7	–	0.125	117	260	6th in CW	Out of Playoffs
2023	8	3	5	–	0.375	140	204	5th in CW	Out of Playoffs
2024	8	2	6	–	0.250	178	201	5th in CW	Out of Playoffs
2025	8	3	5	–	0.375	195	224	5th in CW	Out of Playoffs
2026	8	3	5	–	0.375	204	230	5th in CW	Out of Playoffs

== National postseason results ==
Vanier Cup Era (1965–present)
Year	Game	Opponent	Result
1975	Atlantic Bowl; Vanier Cup	Acadia; Ottawa	W 38–16; L 9–14
1977	Churchill Bowl	Western	L 22–24
1983*	Vanier Cup	Queen's	W 31–21
1984	Churchill Bowl	Guelph	L 7–12
1985	Churchill Bowl; Vanier Cup	Carleton; Western	W 56–14; W 25–6
1988	Chuchill Bowl; Vanier Cup	Western; Saint Mary's	W 34–15; W 52–23
1992	Atlantic Bowl	Saint Mary's	L 11–21
1993	Atlantic Bowl; Vanier Cup	Saint Mary's; Toronto	W 37–23; L 34–37
1995	Churchill Bowl; Vanier Cup	Ottawa; Western	W 37–7; W 54–24
2008	Uteck Bowl	Laval	L 10–59
2009	Uteck Bowl; Vanier Cup	Saint Mary's; Queen's	W 38–14; L 31–33
2010	Mitchell Bowl	Laval	L 2–29
2011	Mitchell Bowl	Laval	L 10–41
2012	Mitchell Bowl	McMaster	L 6–45
2013	Mitchell Bowl; Vanier Cup	Western; Laval	W 44–3; L 14–25
2016	Mitchell Bowl; Vanier Cup	St. Franxis Xavier; Laval	W 50–24; L 26–31
2017	Mitchell Bowl	Laval	L 23–35
2019	Mitchell Bowl; Vanier Cup	McMaster; Montreal	W 30–17; W 27–13

Calgary is 9–8 in national semi-final games and 5–5 in the Vanier Cup.

(*) The Dinos won the 1983 Atlantic Bowl by default as the AUAA protested and forfeited the game over disputes about the game's location.

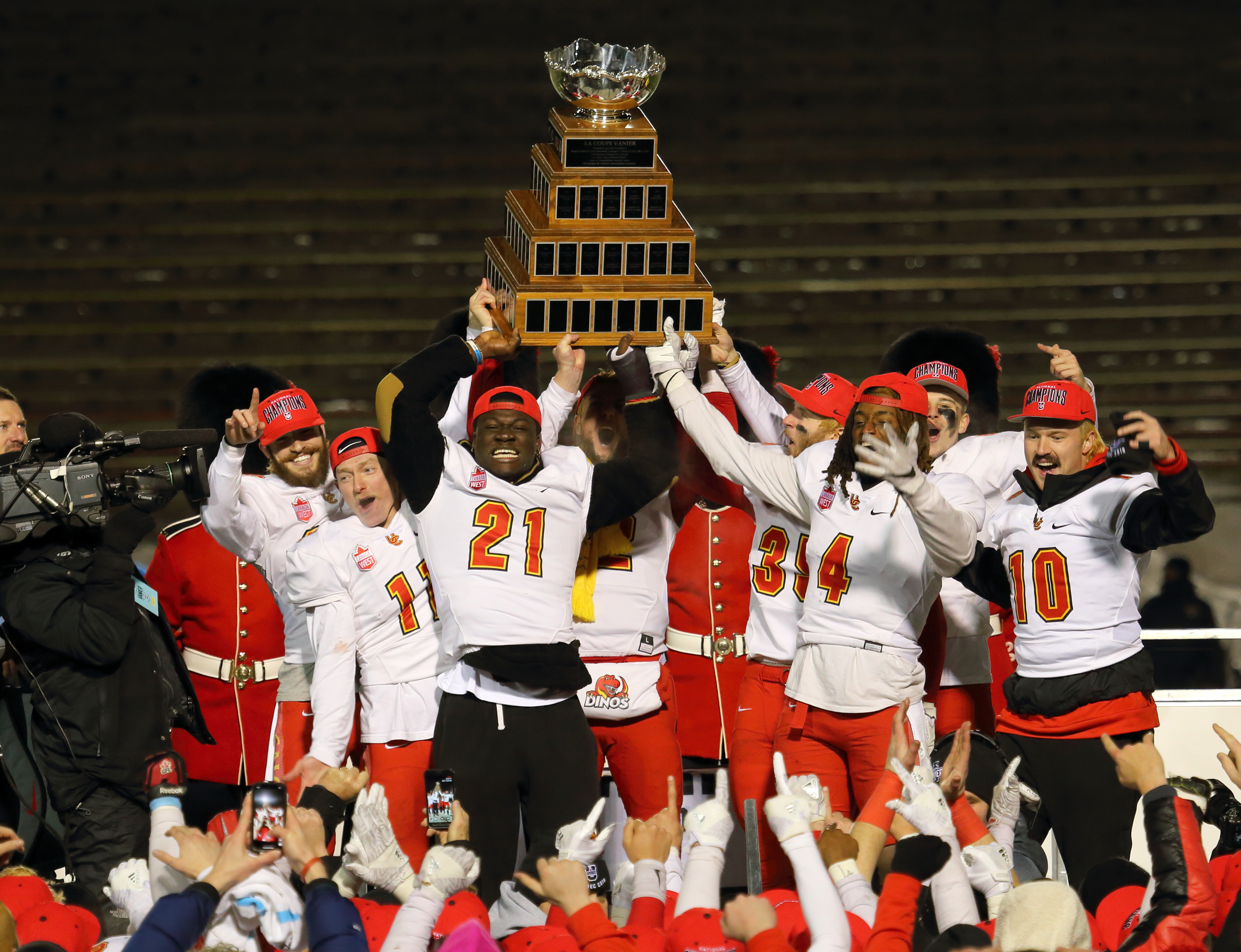
The 2019 Vanier Cup champion Dinos at Telus Stadium.

== Head coaches ==
Name	Years
Dennis Kadatz	1964–1968
Mike Lashuk	1969–1976
Peter Connellan	1977
Mike Lashuk	1978–1982
Peter Connellan	1983–1995
Tony Fasano	1996–2005
Blake Nill	2006–2014
Wayne Harris Jr.	2015–2023
Ryan Sheahan	2024–present

== National award winners ==
- Hec Crighton Trophy: Greg Vavra (1983), Don Blair (1995), Erik Glavic (2009), Andrew Buckley (2014, 2015), Adam Sinagra (2018)
- J. P. Metras Trophy: Scott McArthur (1980), Chris Konrad (1992), Garret Everson (1998)
- Presidents' Trophy: Darcy Kopp (1985), Nate Beauchemin (2024)
- Peter Gorman Trophy: Dalin Tollestrup (2006), Linden Gaydosh (2009), Eric Dzwilewski (2010), Tyson Philpot (2018)
- Russ Jackson Award: Elio Geremia (1987), Lincoln Blumell (2002), Andrew Buckley (2013, 2014)
- Lieutenant Governor Athletic Award: Don Blair (1996), Erik Glavic (2010), Andrew Buckley (2016)
- Frank Tindall Trophy: Peter Connellan (1977, 1985), Wayne Harris, Jr. (2015)

== Calgary Dinos in the CFL ==
As of the end of the 2025 CFL season, 13 former Dinos players were on CFL teams' rosters:

- Ethan Ball, Winnipeg Blue Bombers
- Nate Beauchemin, Montreal Alouettes
- Benjamin Dobson, Ottawa Redblacks
- Adam Konar, BC Lions
- Sean McEwen, Ottawa Redblacks
- Peter Nicastro, Toronto Argonauts
- Chris Pashula, Edmonton Elks
- Jalen Philpot, Calgary Stampeders
- Tyson Philpot, Montreal Alouettes
- Jacob Plamondon, Edmonton Elks
- Matt Sibley, Calgary Stampeders
- Brayden Szeman, Hamilton Tiger-Cats
- Micah Teitz, Calgary Stampeders
