= Kent Warnock =

Canadian football player (born 1964)

Profile
- Position: Defensive end

Personal information
- Born: June 3, 1964 (age 62); Saint John, New Brunswick, Canada
- Listed height: 6 ft 7 in (2.01 m)
- Listed weight: 270 lb (122 kg)

Career information
- University: Calgary
- CFL draft: 1986: 1st round, 1st overall pick

Career history

Playing
- 1987–1992: Calgary Stampeders
- 1993–1994: BC Lions

Coaching
- 2012–?: Calgary Dinos (Defensive line coach)

Awards and highlights
- Grey Cup champion (1992); CFL All-Star (1990); CFL West All-Star (1990); 3× Vanier Cup champion (1983, 1985, 2019)

Kent Warnock (born June 3, 1964) is a Canadian former professional football defensive lineman who played for eight seasons for the Calgary Stampeders and BC Lions. He was drafted first overall in the 1986 CFL draft by the Stampeders and won a Grey Cup championship with the team in 1992. He went to Lord Beaverbrook High School in Calgary, Alberta and played CIAU football for the Dinos where he won Vanier Cup championships in 1983 and 1985.
