= Micah Teitz =

Canadian gridiron football player (born 1996)

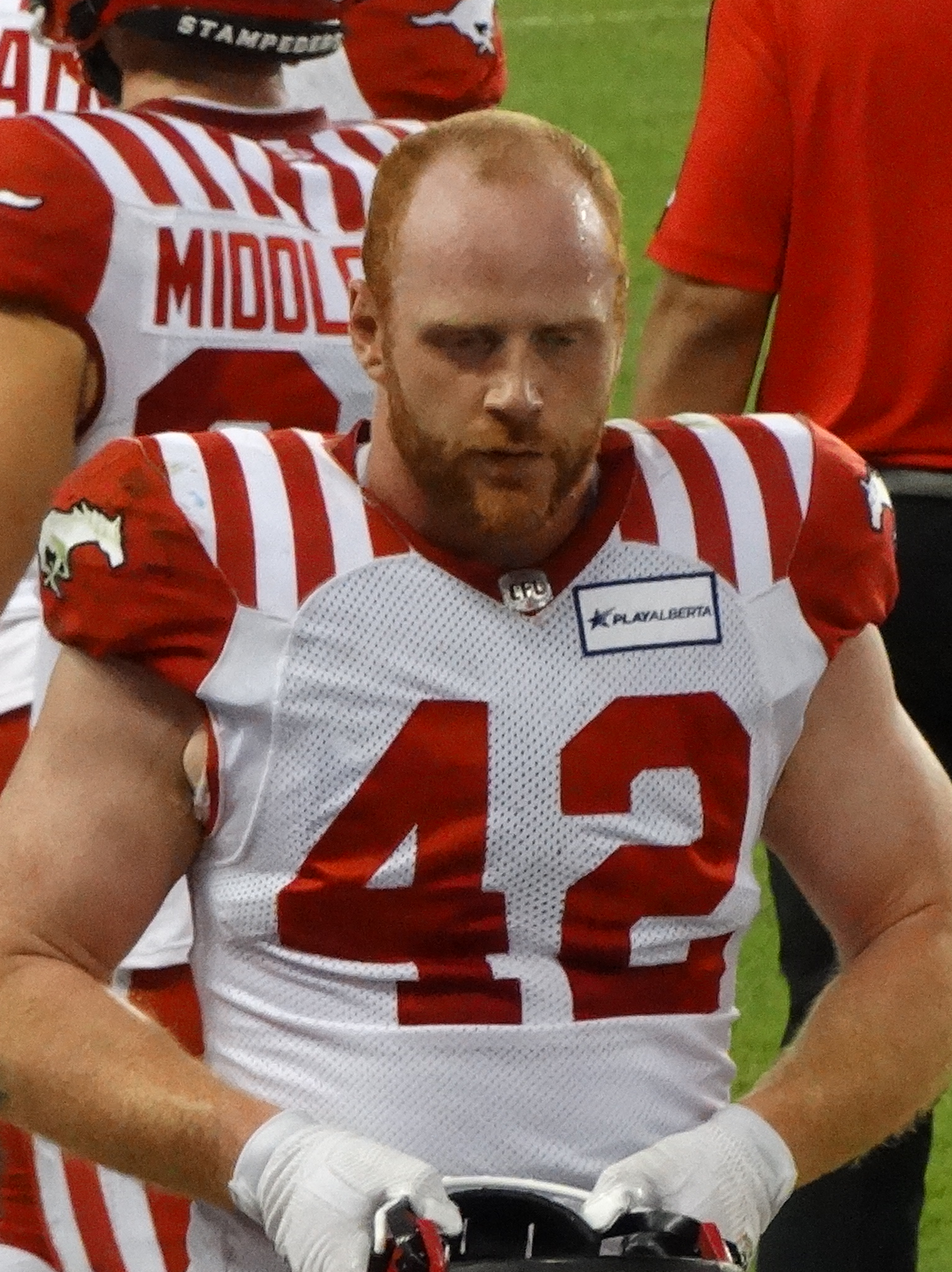
- Teitz with the Calgary Stampeders in 2024

No. 42 – Calgary Stampeders
- Position: Linebacker
- Roster status: Active
- CFL status: National

Personal information
- Born: May 24, 1996 (age 30); Calgary, Alberta, Canada
- Listed height: 6 ft 2 in (1.88 m)
- Listed weight: 230 lb (104 kg)

Career information
- High school: Springbank
- College: Calgary
- CFL draft: 2018: 2nd round, 14th overall pick

Career history
- 2018–2023: Saskatchewan Roughriders
- 2024–present: Calgary Stampeders
- Stats at CFL.ca

Micah Teitz (born May 24, 1996) is a Canadian professional football linebacker for the Calgary Stampeders of the Canadian Football League (CFL).

== University career ==
Teitz played U Sports football for the Calgary Dinos from 2014 to 2017. In his second season, in 2015, he was named a Second-Team All-Canadian after recording 34 tackles, two sacks, and three tackles for a loss. In 2016, he won a Hardy Cup conference championship with the Dinos and played in his first Vanier Cup championship. Teitz led both teams with eight solo tackles and four assisted tackles in the 52nd Vanier Cup, but the Dinos lost the championship game to the Laval Rouge et Or. He finished his university career in 2017 with another Hardy Cup championship, but also with a loss to Laval in the Mitchell Bowl.

== Professional career ==
Pre-draft measurables
Height	Weight	40-yard dash	20-yard shuttle	Three-cone drill	Vertical jump	Broad jump	Bench press
6 ft 1 5/8 in (1.87 m)	229 lb (104 kg)	4.82 s	4.47 s	7.31 s	34.5 in (0.88 m)	9 ft 9 in (2.97 m)	17 reps
All values from CFL Combine

As an eligible draftee for the 2018 CFL draft, Teitz was ranked by the CFL Central Scouting Bureau as the 19th best player available.

=== Saskatchewan Roughriders ===
Teitz was drafted in the second round, 14th overall, by the Saskatchewan Roughriders and signed with the team on May 15, 2018. He made the team's active roster following 2018 training camp and played in his first professional game on June 15, 2018, against the Toronto Argonauts. He spent some time on the injured list throughout the season and finished the season having played in 11 regular season games where he recorded seven special teams tackles.

Teitz played in 16 regular season games during the 2019 season, where he had six defensive tackles and 11 special teams tackles. Five of his defensive tackles came in his first career professional start at linebacker on October 11, 2019, against his hometown Calgary Stampeders. He also played in his first post-season game this season, but the Roughriders lost the West Final to the Winnipeg Blue Bombers.

Due to the 2020 CFL season being cancelled, Teitz did not play in 2020. In 2021, he became a more prominent fixture on defense and recorded a career-high eight defensive tackles and his first career sack in the August 21, 2021 win against the Ottawa Redblacks.

Teitz became a free agent upon the expiry of his contract on February 13, 2024.

=== Calgary Stampeders ===
On February 13, 2024, the Calgary Stampeders announced that Teitz had signed with the team.
