= Wayne Harris Jr. =

Canadian football player (born 1959)

Profile
- Position: Linebacker

Personal information
- Born: October 30, 1959 (age 67)
- Listed height: 6 ft 0 in (1.83 m)
- Listed weight: 210 lb (95 kg)

Career information
- University: Calgary
- CFL draft: 1981: 7th round, 60th overall pick

Career history

Playing
- 1982: Calgary Stampeders

Coaching
- 1991–1993: Calgary Colts (HC)
- 2006–2010: Calgary Dinos (AC)
- 2011–2014: Calgary Dinos (DC)
- 2015–2023: Calgary Dinos (HC)

Awards and highlights
- 2× Vanier Cup champion (1995, 2019); Frank Tindall Trophy (2015)

Wayne Harris Jr. (born October 30, 1959) is a Canadian former professional football linebacker and was the head coach for the University of Calgary's football team, the Calgary Dinos, from 2015 to 2023.

== University playing career ==
Harris played CIAU football for the Calgary Dinosaurs as a linebacker.

== Professional career ==
Harris was drafted in the seventh round, 60th overall, by the Calgary Stampeders in the 1981 CFL draft. He played in one season for the Stampeders, in 1982.

== Coaching career ==
Harris became Calgary's head coach on February 12, 2015, after serving as defensive coordinator for the Dinos for four years and as an assistant coach for three separate stints between 1989 and 2014. In his first season, in 2015, he won the Frank Tindall Trophy. He later led the team to a Vanier Cup championship in 2019. On November 2, 2023, Harris announced his retirement after compiling a 41–21 record as head coach, along with three Hardy Cup championships and one Vanier Cup championship.

== Head coaching record ==
Year	Team	Overall	Conference	Standing	Bowl/playoffs
Calgary Dinos (Canada West) (2015–present)
2015	Calgary	9–1	8–0	1st	
2016	Calgary	9–3	6–2	1st	W Mitchell, L Vanier
2017	Calgary	9–2	7–1	1st	L Mitchell
2018	Calgary	9–1	8–0	1st	
2019	Calgary	10–2	6–2	1st	W Mitchell, W Vanier
2021	Calgary	2–4	2–4	5th	
2022	Calgary	1–8	1–7	6th	
2023	Calgary	3–5	3–5	5th	
Calgary:		52–26	41–21		
Total:		52–26			
National championship Conference title Conference division title or championship game berth

== Personal life ==
Harris is the son of Canadian Football Hall of Famer Wayne Harris.
