= Viscount Bennett High School =

Coordinates: 51.029126°N 114.119234°W

Location
- 2519 Richmond Road SW; Calgary, Alberta

Information
- School type: Public
- Opened: September 1955 (jr high); September 1956 (sr high)
- Closed: June 1984 (sr high); June 1985 (jr high)
- School board: Calgary Board of Education
- Grades: 7-12
- Teams: Vikings
- Yearbook: The Terminal

Viscount Bennett High School was a combined junior and senior high school in the Richmond neighbourhood of Calgary, Alberta, that operated from 1955 to 1985. The city's fourth high school, Viscount was built to accommodate the baby boomer generation and the southwest suburbs that had grown rapidly after World War II. At its peak in the mid-1960s, the school had over 2,000 students. Due to the area's ageing population and the opening of other high schools nearby, after only 30 years Viscount Bennett closed in 1985.

== History ==
Viscount Bennett was formed in the wake of two events. First, the Leduc No. 1 oil discovery in February 1947 started an oil boom that led to the greatest period of growth in Calgary's history. Between 1945 and 1955, Calgary's population roughly doubled from 97,000 to 186,000. Second, the post-war baby boom created the largest generational cohort in Canadian history. The birth of this generation necessitated massive investments in education at all levels.

At the end of the war, Calgary only had three high schools: Western Canada High School, Crescent Heights High School, and Central High School. Planning for a new junior-senior high began around 1950, and in March 1951 the Calgary Board of Education (CBE) purchased a 10-acre site on the southwest corner of Richmond Road and 24th Street (Crowchild Trail) from the Canadian Pacific Railway for $19,000. However, the northeast corner of the site comprised a separately-owned 1.6-acre property. This property was occupied by the Currie Riding Academy and was owned by Ira Freeman Anderson (1910–2003). Anderson asked $65,000 for the land and the CBE offered $45,000. After two years of failed negotiations and two rejections by education minister Anders Aalborg (1914–2000) to expropriate the land, in May 1953 the CBE relented and paid the full price.

The new school was designed by English-born architect William Archibald Branton (1887–1976), the CBE's building superintendent. It was Branton's last major project before he retired in December 1956. The junior high, gymnasium, and cafeteria were built during 1955 and cost $955,634. Construction was undertaken by Bennett and White and was completed in time for the beginning of the school year in September. The school was named after Prime Minister R. B. Bennett, 1st Viscount Bennett (1870–1947), who had spent much of his career in Calgary. Viscount's school crest was modeled off the personal arms of R. B. Bennett. Opening ceremonies for the school took place on the evening of Monday, 13 February 1956 under the chairmanship of Maclean Everett Jones QC (1918–2007), a founding partner of the law firm Bennett Jones. In January 1956, a call for tenders for the 16-room senior high school section went out. In February the contract was awarded to Bird Construction and the building was completed for September. The addition cost $509,006, bringing the total to around $1.5 million. By the early 1960s, overcrowding threatened the introduction of a shift system for students. To avoid this, in the summer of 1961 construction began on a new 15-classroom academic wing, wood shop and auto shop to the south, and a library beside the main entrance at the north. Designs were done by CBE architect Jack Jacob Smart (1917–1999) and work was completed by the fall of 1962 at a cost of $770,765. The final addition was an expansion of the library in 1972.

Viscount was intended primarily as an academic school; students who pursued a technical education attended Western Canada, which at the time was a composite school. The first principal was Hugh Wallace Bryan (1905–1996), who held the post until 1969. Viscount's first graduating cohort was the Class of '59. Famed television journalist Peter Kent, who was in Viscount's Class of '61, described the school's atmosphere in the early days as being "like Rydell High in the movie Grease, with pretty cheerleaders and a few guys lucky enough to have a car." In addition to academics, the school had a strong athletics programme that from 1964 to 1975 was led by future Vanier Cup champion and Canadian Football Hall of Fame inductee Peter Connellan. Former Calgary Stampeders lineman George Hansen (1934–2017) also served as a teacher and football coach. The school's music programme was led from 1955 to 1969 by Roy Bert Dow (1931–2025), who then served as principal from 1969 to 1976. From 1958 to 1982 Viscount's choirs were directed by Marilyn Irma Perkins CM (1933–2003).

Students at Viscount Bennett were mostly middle class and lived in post-war bungalows. The school also had a significant population of army brats whose fathers were stationed at nearby Currie Barracks. In wealth Viscount ranked second to Western Canada, which drew the majority of Calgary's upper class. Several Viscount graduates went on to prolific careers in politics, sport, and the arts. Alumni include two Mayors of Calgary and a Leader of the Official Opposition. A number of elite junior hockey players attended the school. Viscount alumnus and former NHL player Garry Unger, who played for the Calgary Buffaloes during high school, said, "the teachers at Calgary's Viscount Bennett High School did not make any big deal about the players on the Buffaloes."

At its pinnacle in the 1960s the school had around 2,100 students. By the late 1970s Viscount's enrollment had begun to decline steadily and in 1980 it had only 850 students. The causes of this were twofold. First, as the majority of baby boomers reached adulthood, the neighbourhoods surrounding Viscount became predominantly childless. Second, the opening of two new high schools within a mile of Viscount – Ernest Manning High School in 1963 and Central Memorial High School in 1968 – took away many students who might have attended. Consequently, by the 1980s the CBE faced significant pressure to close the school. At the end of the 1984 academic year the senior high school was closed and in 1985 the junior high followed.

After the school's closure the facility became the Viscount Bennett Centre, a continuing education institution. In the ensuing decades, the school became increasingly rough; in March 1997 a student fired a gun inside and in September 2000 another student was mobbed and stabbed on the front steps. From September 2001 to June 2011, the building also housed the Westmount Charter School. In August 2018 the CBE shuttered the building, which had nearly been condemned the previous decade. The last activity to take place in Viscount Bennett was in August 2019, when the FX miniseries A Teacher was filmed at the school.

On 24 May 2023, the Viscount property was sold to the Minto Group for redevelopment.

== Senior varsity championships ==
Football: 1960-61, 1967-68, 1969-70, 1972-73

Boys' basketball: 1981-82

Girls' basketball: 1964-65, 1966-67

== Notable alumni ==
- David Atkinson '66 – academic and university president
- Dave Bronconnier '80 – 35th Mayor of Calgary
- Brian Carlin – NHL player
- Charlie Fischer '68 – petroleum executive
- Grant Hill '61 – federal politician and Leader of the Official Opposition
- Peter Kent '61 – journalist and federal politician
- Ralph Klein – 32nd Mayor of Calgary and 12th Premier of Alberta
- Al McLeod '67 – NHL player
- Debbie Muir – coach in synchronized swimming
- Darlene Quaife '66 – author
- Chic Scott '63 – mountaineer and author
- Brian Spencer – NHL player
- Garry Unger '65 – NHL player
- Jeth Weinrich '78 – filmmaker
