= Hamilton Stadium =

Multi-purpose stadium in Hamilton, Canada

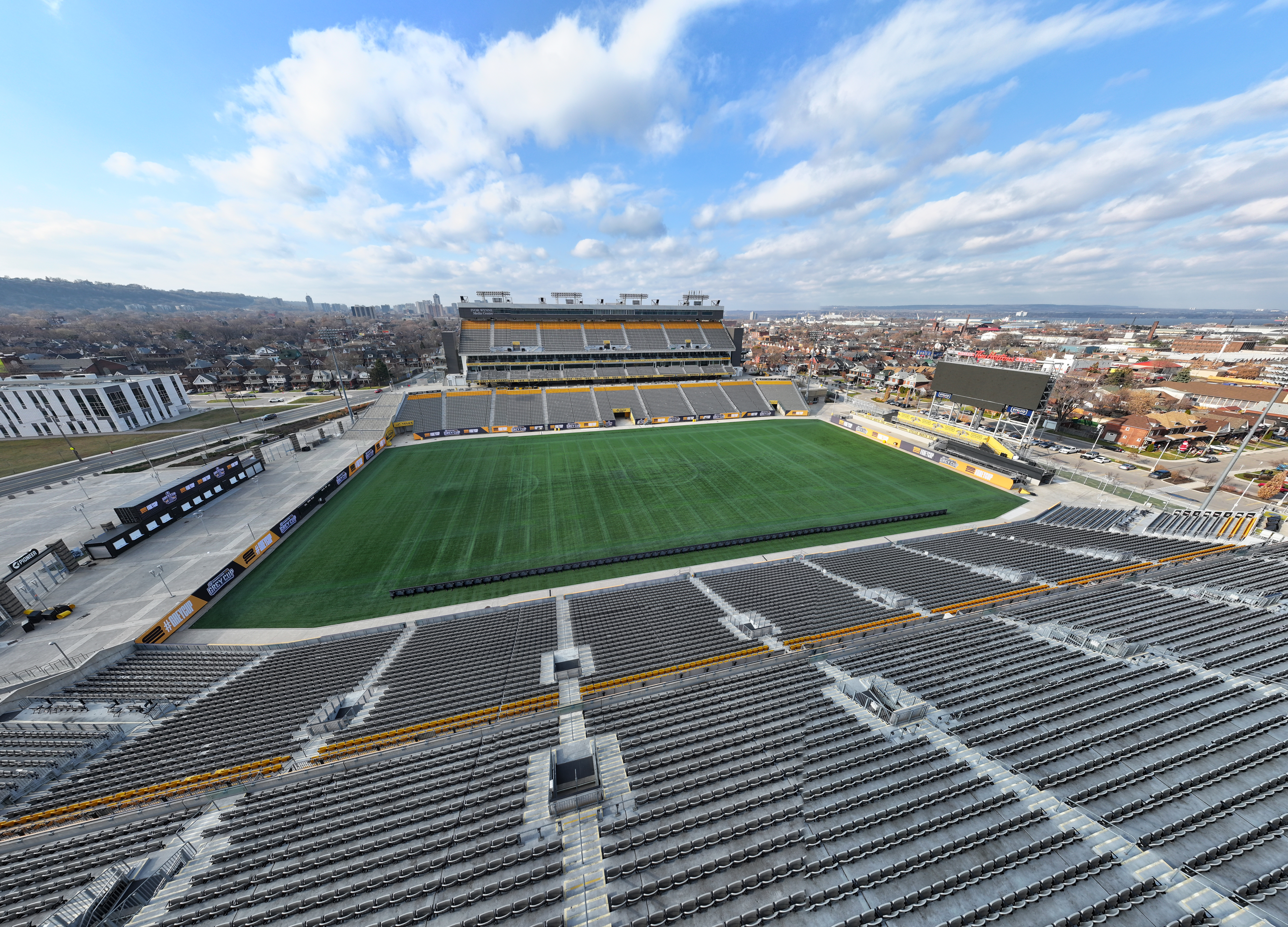
- Hamilton Stadium interior, 2023

- Location in Southern Ontario Location in Ontario Location in Canada
- Former names: Tim Hortons Field (2014–2024)
- Address: 64 Melrose Avenue North
- Location: Hamilton, Ontario, Canada
- Coordinates: 43°15′8″N 79°49′48″W
- Owner: City of Hamilton
- Operator: Hamilton Sports Group
- Capacity: 23,218
- Surface: FieldTurf Revolution
- Record attendance: 28,808 (110th Grey Cup)
- Field size: Soccer: 110 m (120 yd) x 68 m (74 yd)

Construction
- Groundbreaking: November 2012
- Opened: September 1, 2014
- Cost: $145.7 million
- Architect: Cannon

Tenants
- Hamilton Tiger-Cats (CFL) 2014–present Hamilton Hurricanes (CJFL) 2014–present Forge FC (CPL) 2019–present Mohawk College soccer (OCAA) 2022–2024; Hamilton United (OPL) 2023–present (select matches); Sigma FC (OPL) 2023–present (select matches)

Hamilton Stadium (originally Tim Hortons Field) is a multi-purpose stadium in Hamilton, Ontario, Canada. Completed in 2014 with a capacity of 22,500, it was built as a replacement on the same site as the previous stadium, named Ivor Wynne Stadium, which had been there since 1930. It is primarily used for Canadian football and soccer, and is the home of the Hamilton Tiger-Cats of the Canadian Football League and Forge FC of the Canadian Premier League, amongst other teams.

The stadium has also played host to the international soccer tournament at the 2015 Pan American Games as well as various other sports and music concerts.

== History ==
=== Background ===
Ivor Wynne Stadium was a large outdoor stadium in Hamilton that opened in 1930. Originally known as Civic Stadium, it was the home of the Hamilton Tiger-Cats Canadian football team since 1950. In 2009, the 2015 Pan American Games were awarded to the Greater Toronto Area and Hamilton was selected to host soccer and track and field events. The city deliberated building a brand new stadium (possibly at the city's West Harbour) or renovating Ivor Wynne.

=== Stadium development ===
Initial plans for the stadium were for it to be a principal Pan American stadium for soccer and track and field/athletics events. However, disputes between the Tiger-Cats owner, Bob Young, the organizers of the 2015 Pan American Games, and the City of Hamilton arose over the location of the stadium. In early 2011, the Hamilton city councilors voted to demolish and rebuild the south stand of the stadium while leaving the north stand unchanged. This plan had a budget of CA$115 million.

Then in 2012, the Pan-Am organizers indicated that they would be shifting their focus toward venues and "clusters" that could be used for multiple events, which might eliminate the need for a new stadium that would be used only for soccer. They proposed another stadium on the campus of York University, tentatively named York Athletics Stadium, to host the track and field events. That, coupled with a scheduling process that had soccer and rugby sevens events on different days (thus opening the possibility that Toronto's BMO Field, which would house the rugby sevens contests in 2015 might also be able to host the soccer contests), had the potential to put the Hamilton stadium project in jeopardy. Ultimately, it was decided that Ivor Wynne would be completely demolished and a new stadium would be built on the same site. The new stadium hosted all 32 men's and women's Pan Am soccer matches and was temporarily named Hamilton Pan Am Soccer Stadium during the games.

==== Financial details ====
In July 2013, a ten-year sponsorship deal was put in place with Tim Hortons, who acquired the stadium's naming rights. The coffee beverage fast food chain was founded only a few blocks away from the stadium some fifty years earlier.

The final financial details planned were that the stadium was built at a total cost of $145 million. The city of Hamilton contributed $54 million, the province of Ontario, $22 million, and the federal government of Canada, $69 million. Then, in 2014, the Tiger-Cats agreed to pay $1.2 million a year on a 20-year lease to be a tenant.

=== Construction ===
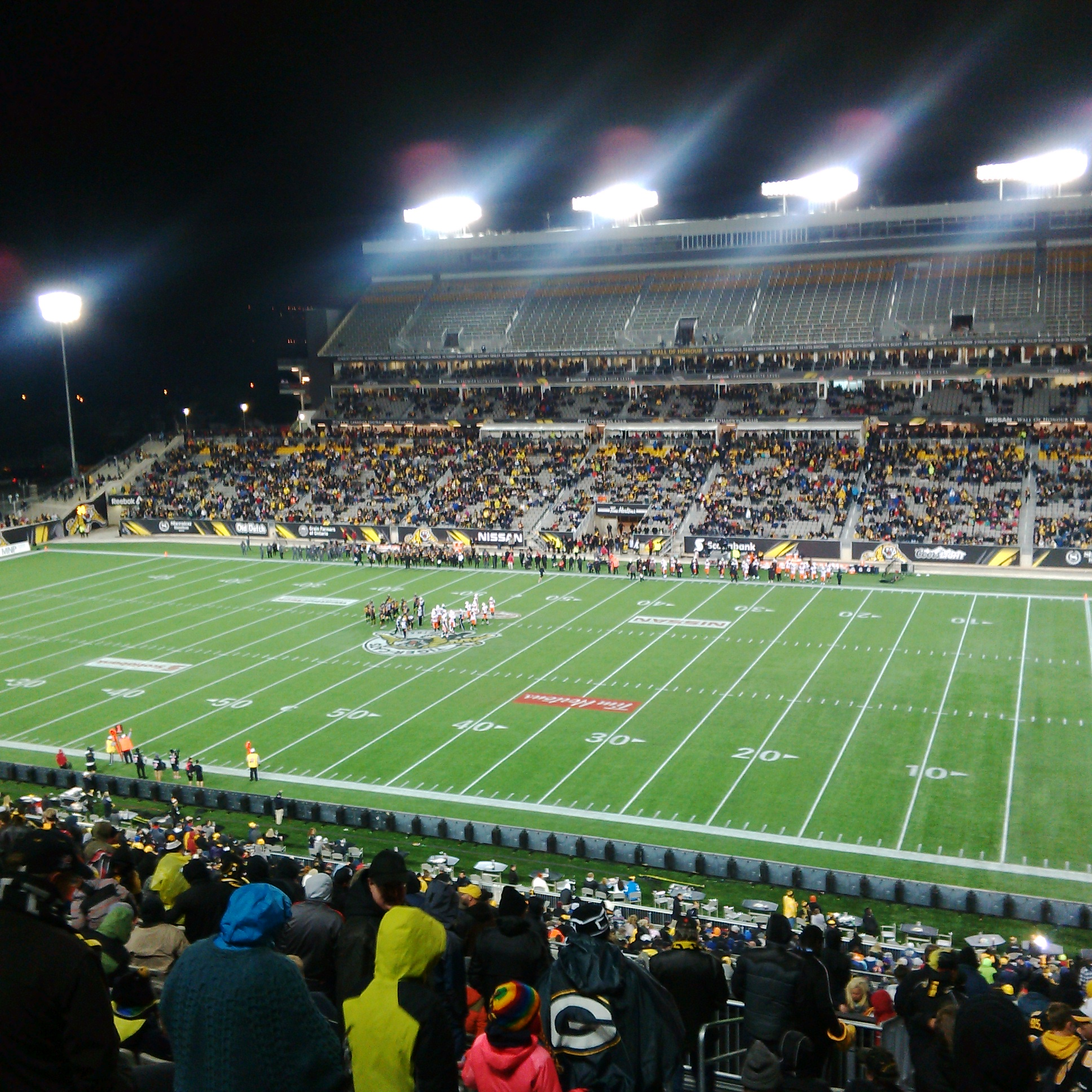
Stadium in October 2014, prior to the completion of the upper deck

The design was by architects CannonDesign and engineered by the Arup Group, amongst other companies involved in its construction. There are officially 22,500 seats, with the potential of further expanding the stands. Completed in 2014, the stadium can expand to a potential capacity of up to more than 40,000 seats for special events (such as hosting a Grey Cup contest) in the future. The design of the new stadium also increased the width of the field to accommodate soccer games by meeting FIFA's international standards for soccer pitches; reoriented the playing field from east–west to a north–south orientation; increased the seat width and leg room/corridor space to make it one of the most spacious among Canadian sports venues; incorporated extensive wireless communications infrastructure and washroom facilities; as well as adding luxury boxes, and other modern amenities. The field surface is FIFA- and CFL-approved artificial turf. The stadium opened in 2014, two months after its original anticipated completion date of June 30.

Immediately following the stadium opening in 2014, there had been numerous issues regarding the quality of the construction. The City of Hamilton subsequently spent upwards of $2.5 million in fixes and safety repairs including replacing rain-damaged television screens and faulty baby-changing tables, installing draft beer lines, improving ventilation, sealing leaky expansion joints and repairing faulty floor drains.

The stadium's nickname is "the donut box", a reference to the links to the coffee chain and the rectangle shape of the stands layout.

=== Opening ===
On September 1, 2014, the Tiger-Cats played their first game at the new stadium – a 13–12 win against the Toronto Argonauts. About 6,000 seats were not available for the game because construction was still ongoing. The 2014 lease for the Tiger-Cats stipulated that the press box would be named the "Ivor Wynne Press Centre", retaining part of the previous stadium's legacy.

The CFL's Toronto Argonauts played two home games at Hamilton Stadium in 2015, due to clashes with the MLB's Toronto Blue Jays playoffs games. The stadium has also occasionally hosted special games for Hamilton's amateur football teams; the Hamilton Hurricanes of the Canadian Junior Football League played a game in the stadium in 2015 and the McMaster Marauders football team played its 2016 Labour Day contest at the field in a doubleheader with the Tiger-Cats. The Hurricanes returned to the field twice in 2017, the latter being its own Labour Day contest.

In January 2015, U Sports awarded Hamilton Stadium hosting rights to the 52nd and 53rd Vanier Cup, held in November 2016 and November 2017 respectively.

In 2019, Hamilton Stadium hosted the Canadian Premier League inaugural match in April for Forge FC, the stadium's new tenant, and the first ever CPL Finals match in October.

=== Renaming ===
On December 18, 2024, it was announced that the stadium would go through a name-changing process after the initial ten-year naming rights agreement with Tim Hortons expired and Tim Hortons chose not to renew it. The venue was temporarily renamed to Hamilton Stadium until a new naming rights deal was awarded.

== Ownership ==
The stadium and the land is owned by the City of Hamilton. The master licence agreement for Hamilton Stadium is held by Hamilton Sports Group (HSG), a partnership that owns and operates the Hamilton Tiger-Cats of the CFL and Forge FC of the CPL. This group is led by businessman Bob Young, who serves as the chairman and is HSG's largest single shareholder, and also includes steel company Stelco, CEO Scott Mitchell, and Jim Lawson. The Hamilton Tiger-Cats and Forge FC are tenants of Hamilton Stadium and play their home games at the stadium.

== Stadium uses ==
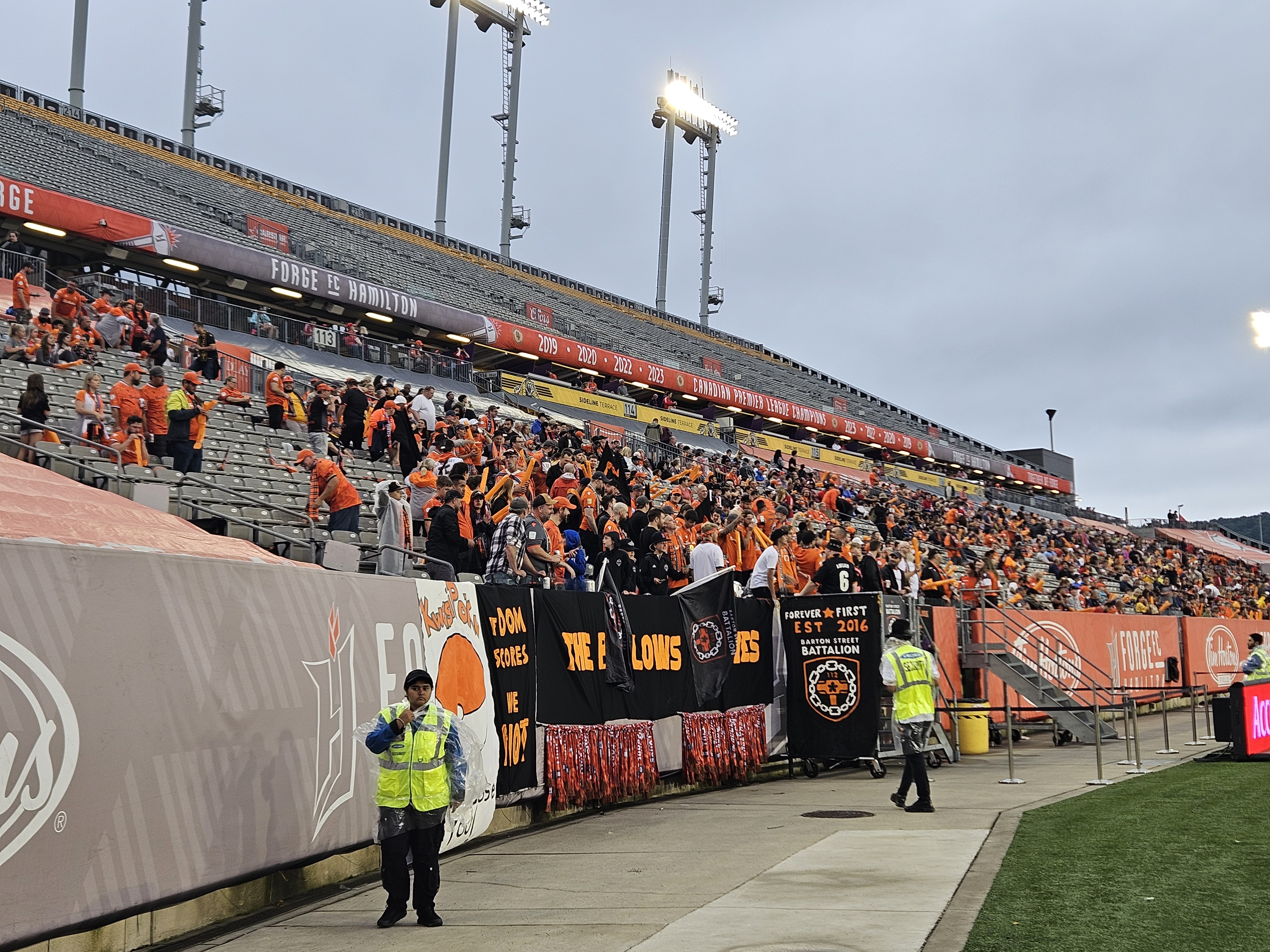
A stand in Hamilton Stadium for Forge FC

The professional sporting teams who are leased occupants of the football/soccer stadium are the Canadian football team, Hamilton Tiger-Cats, and the soccer team, Forge FC. Hamilton Stadium has also played host to the other sporting events including ice hockey, rugby union and dirt biking (Nitro Circus), as well as music concerts.

The stadium also has premium seating in the stands, with club and suite level spaces available during an event or for private rentals. The lounges are for both corporate and social events.

== Notable sporting events hosted ==
Date	Home team	Score	Away team	Event	Attendance
July 11–26, 2015	32 matches			Pan-Am Games soccer	N/A
November 26, 2016	Calgary Dinos	26–31	Laval Rouge et Or	52nd Vanier Cup	7,115
June 24, 2017	Canada	28–28	United States	Rugby World Cup qualification match	13,138
November 25, 2017	Western Mustangs	39–17	Laval Rouge et Or	53rd Vanier Cup	10,754
April 27, 2019	Forge FC	1–1	York9 FC	Canadian Premier League inaugural match	17,611
October 26, 2019	Forge FC	1–0	Cavalry FC	2019 Canadian Premier League finals leg 1	10,486
December 5, 2021	Forge FC	0–1	Pacific FC	2021 Canadian Premier League final	7,488
December 12, 2021	Hamilton Tiger-Cats	25–33	Winnipeg Blue Bombers	108th Grey Cup	26,324
January 30, 2022	Canada	2–0	United States	2022 FIFA World Cup qualification match	~12,000 (50% capacity due to COVID-19 restrictions)
March 13, 2022	Buffalo Sabres	5–2	Toronto Maple Leafs	2022 Heritage Classic	26,119
March 14, 2022	Hamilton Bulldogs	3–0	Oshawa Generals	2022 Outdoor Showcase	12,587
June 4, 2022	Forge FC	1–1 (4–5 p)	Toronto FC	2020 Canadian Championship final	13,715
October 28, 2023	Forge FC	2–1 (a.e.t.)	Cavalry FC	2023 Canadian Premier League final	13,925
November 19, 2023	Montreal Alouettes	28–24	Winnipeg Blue Bombers	110th Grey Cup	28,808

== See also ==
- List of Canadian Football League stadiums
- List of Canadian Premier League stadiums
- Venues of the 2015 Pan American and Parapan American Games
