= Mike Lashuk =

Canadian football player (1938–2023)

No. 28
- Positions: Fullback, linebacker, punter

Personal information
- Born: December 9, 1938; Edmonton, Alberta, Canada
- Died: October 24, 2023 (aged 84); Montreal, Quebec, Canada
- Listed height: 6 ft 0 in (1.83 m)
- Listed weight: 185 lb (84 kg)

Career information
- AJFL: Edmonton Huskies

Career history

Playing
- 1957–1963: Edmonton Eskimos

Coaching
- 1962–1963: Ross Sheppard High School
- 1964: Crescent Heights High School
- 1966: Edmonton Wildcats
- 1967: Henry Wise Wood High School
- 1968: University of Calgary (Asst.)
- 1969–1976: University of Calgary
- 1978–1982: University of Calgary

Awards and highlights
- Dr. Beattie Martin Trophy (1957); Led team in rushing 1962 for 802 yrds

Michael Lashuk (December 9, 1938 – October 24, 2023) was a Canadian professional football player and coach. An fullback and linebacker, he played in the Canadian Football League for the Edmonton Eskimos from 1957 to 1963. He was head coach of the University of Calgary Dinosaurs football program for 13 seasons from 1969 to 1976 and 1978 to 1982, leading the team to its first conference championship and their inaugural appearance in the Vanier Cup.

== Playing ==
A native of Edmonton, Lashuk was a star fullback at Victoria Composite High School and played for the Edmonton Huskies of the Alberta Junior Football League in 1956. He entered the professional ranks in 1957 as a linebacker and fullback for the Edmonton Eskimos. He won the Dr. Beattie Martin Trophy for Canadian rookie of the year in the west, rushing for 164 yards and intercepting 2 passes. He had 3 interceptions in 1958, 5 in 1959 and 4 in 1960. He rushed for 757 yards in 1961 and led the team with 802 rushing yards in 1962. He was the Eskimos' nominee for the Schenley Award in 1962. He only rushed for 70 yards in 1963, but intercepted two passes and punted the ball 41 times with an average of 38.9 yards per punt. In 1964, Lashuk decided to accept a teaching job in Calgary and did not report to the Eskimos. He attempted a comeback with Edmonton in 1965, but he retired during training camp.

== Coaching ==
Lashuk earned his bachelor's degree in physical education from the University of Alberta in 1960 and his master's degree from Southern Illinois University in 1967. After retiring, he coached at Ross Sheppard High School in Edmonton and Crescent Heights and Henry Wise Wood High Schools in Calgary, winning city championships in 1962 (Ross Sheppard) and 1964 (Crescent Heights). He also spent a season as the head coach of the Edmonton Wildcats and led them to the western junior final. In 1968, he became a lecturer and assistant football coach at the University of Calgary, where he worked under his former Huskies teammate Dennis Kadatz. Kadatz retired after the 1969 season to focus on his dutites as athletic director and Lashuk succeeded him as head coach.

Lashuk was head coach of the Dinos from 1969 to 1976 and 1978 to 1982, with a record of 57–49. He led the team to its first conference championship and their inaugural appearance in the Vanier Cup in 1975.

Lashuk died in Montreal on October 24, 2023, at the age of 84.
