= Andrew Buckley (Canadian football) =

Canadian football player (born 1993)

Profile
- Position: Quarterback

Personal information
- Born: August 20, 1993 (age 33); Calgary, Alberta, Canada
- Listed height: 6 ft 0 in (1.83 m)
- Listed weight: 203 lb (92 kg)

Career information
- High school: Rundle College
- University: Calgary
- CFL draft: 2015: 7th round, 62nd overall pick

Career history
- 2015: Calgary Stampeders*
- 2016–2017: Calgary Stampeders
- * Offseason or practice squad member only

Awards and highlights
- 2× Hec Crighton Trophy (2014, 2015); Lois and Doug Mitchell Award (2016); 2× Russ Jackson Award (2013, 2014)
- Stats at CFL.ca

Andrew Buckley (born August 20, 1993) is a Canadian former professional football quarterback who played two seasons with the Calgary Stampeders of the Canadian Football League (CFL). He was drafted in the seventh round, 63rd overall, by the Stampeders in the 2015 CFL draft. He played CIS football for the Calgary Dinos where he won two consecutive Hec Crighton Trophy awards in 2014 and 2015.

== Background ==
Buckley was born in Calgary and spent his high school career playing at Rundle College and then the University of Calgary (Dinos).

== Professional career ==
Buckley was drafted in the seventh round of the 2015 CFL draft and participated in the Stampeders' 2015 training camp before returning to university to play his final season of CIS football. He re-signed with the Stampeders on January 6, 2016, and made the team's 2016 roster as the third-string quarterback.

Buckley played as a short yardage quarterback for the Stampeders in the 2016 Grey Cup and scored a rushing touchdown in the third quarter. He was the first Canadian quarterback to score a touchdown in a Grey Cup since Russ Jackson in 1969. On June 17, 2017, Buckley was named as Calgary's back-up quarterback, by head coach Dave Dickenson after the departure of Drew Tate. Buckley announced his retirement from professional football on May 7, 2018, after being accepted into medical school at the University of Calgary (Cumming School of Medicine). His parents are both doctors and he always wanted to be one, as well.
