= Adam Sinagra =

Canadian football player (born 1995)

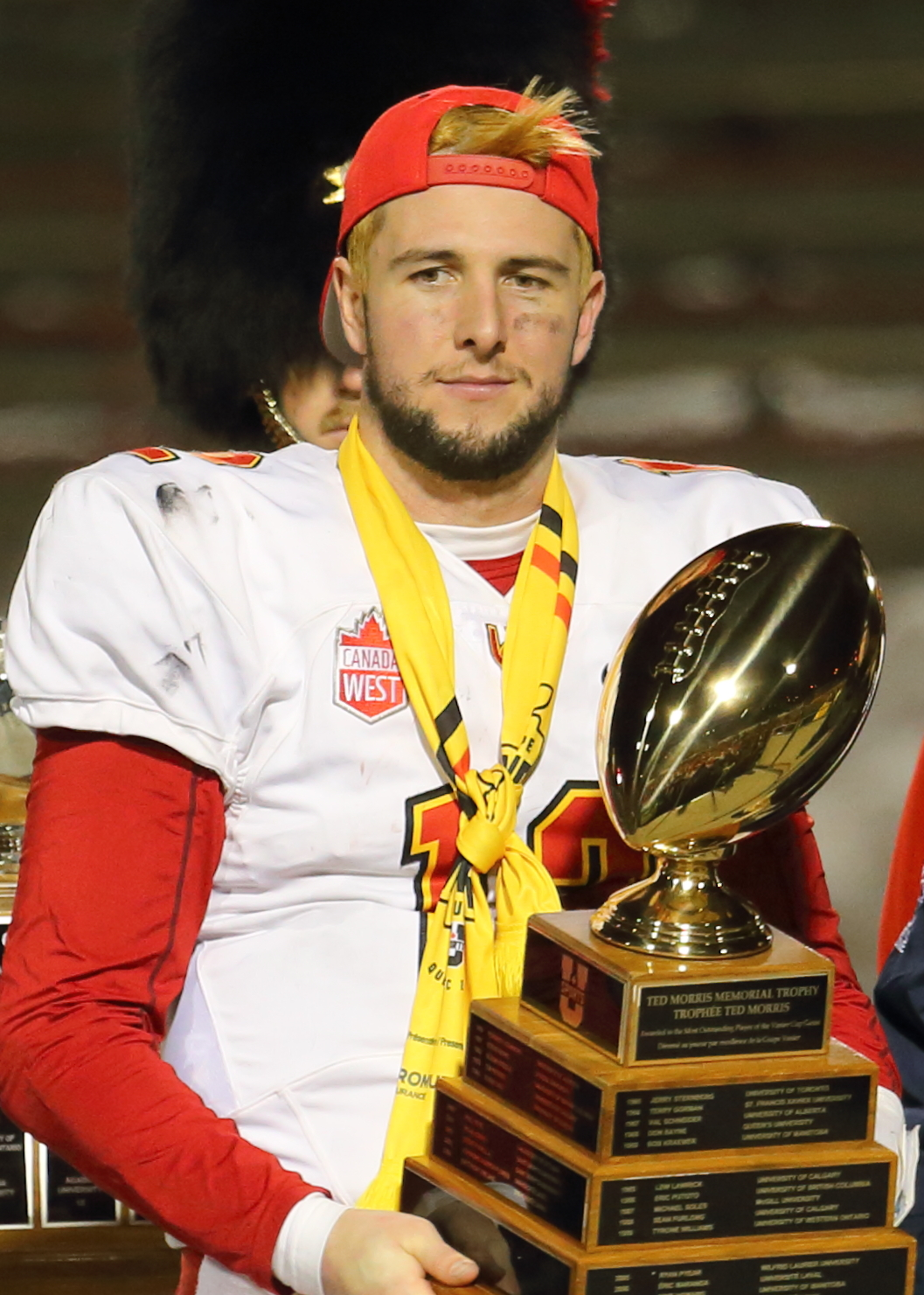
- Sinagra with the Ted Morris Trophy in 2019

Profile
- Position: Quarterback

Personal information
- Born: January 10, 1995 (age 31); Chateauguay, Quebec, Canada
- Listed height: 6 ft 1 in (1.85 m)
- Listed weight: 195 lb (88 kg)

Career information
- University: Calgary Dinos
- CFL draft: 2020: undrafted

Awards and highlights
- Vanier Cup champion (2019); Vanier Cup MVP (2019); Hec Crighton Trophy Winner (2018); Most single-season passing yards in U Sports football (3,233)

Adam Sinagra (born January 10, 1995) is a Canadian former football quarterback. He played for the Calgary Dinos of the Canada West conference of U Sports. He is a Vanier Cup champion after winning the 2019 and was named the game's MVP. He also won the Hec Crighton Trophy in 2018 as U Sports football's most outstanding player. After his college career Sinagra went undrafted in the 2020 CFL draft.

== University career ==
Sinagra became the starting quarterback for the Dinos mid-way through the 2016 season and led the team to Hardy Cup conference championships in 2016, 2017, and 2019. In 2018, he won the Hec Crighton Trophy as the most valuable player in U Sports football after passing for a U Sports record 3,233 passing yards, completing 186 passes out of 281 attempts with 23 passing touchdowns and five interceptions. In 2019, he was the starting quarterback in the 55th Vanier Cup game, where he led the Dinos to a 27–13 victory over the Montreal Carabins and was named the game's Most Valuable Player.

== Professional career ==
Sinagra was ranked as the 14th best player in the CFL's Amateur Scouting Bureau December rankings for players eligible in the 2020 CFL draft, and sixth by players in U Sports, at the end of the 2019 U Sports season, but dropped off the CFL's final Top 20 list in April. He went undrafted in the 2020 CFL draft. He was reportedly added as a non-counter player by the Montreal Alouettes, although it had not been officially announced. However, the season was cancelled due to the COVID-19 pandemic. Sinagra never played in the CFL.
