= 31st Vanier Cup =

1995 Canadian university football championship

Calgary Dinos	Western Mustangs
(6–2)	(6–1–1)
54	24
Head coach: Peter Connellan	Head coach: Larry Haylor
	1	2	3	4	Total
Calgary Dinos	10	16	21	7	54
Western Mustangs	7	3	0	14	24
- Date: November 25, 1995
- Stadium: SkyDome
- Location: Toronto
- Ted Morris Memorial Trophy: Don Blair, WR, Calgary
- Bruce Coulter Award: Rob Richards, DL, Calgary
- Attendance: 29,178

The 31st Vanier Cup was played on November 25, 1995, at the SkyDome in Toronto, Ontario, and decided the CIAU football champion for the 1995 season. The Calgary Dinos won their fourth championship by defeating the Western Mustangs by a score of 54-24.
