= 24th Vanier Cup =

1988 Canadian university football championship

Calgary Dinos	Saint Mary's Huskies
(7–1)	(7–0)
52	23
Head coach: Peter Connellan	Head coach: Larry Uteck
	1	2	3	4	Total
Calgary Dinos	0	0	0	52	52
Saint Mary's Huskies	0	0	0	23	23
- Date: November 19, 1988
- Stadium: Varsity Stadium
- Location: Toronto
- Ted Morris Memorial Trophy: Sean Furlong, Calgary
- Attendance: 13,127

The 24th Vanier Cup was played on November 19, 1988, at Varsity Stadium in Toronto, Ontario, and decided the CIAU football champion for the 1988 season. The Calgary Dinos won their third championship by defeating the Saint Mary's Huskies by a score of 52-23. This was the last Vanier Cup game to be played at Varsity Stadium as the championship would be played at the new SkyDome the following year.
