= 19th Vanier Cup =

1983 Canadian university football championship

Calgary Dinos	Queen's Golden Gaels
(6–2)	(4–1–2)
31	21
Head coach: Peter Connellan	Head coach: Doug Hargreaves
	1	2	3	4	Total
Calgary Dinos	11	6	0	14	31
Queen's Golden Gaels	3	0	0	18	21
- Date: November 19, 1983
- Stadium: Varsity Stadium
- Location: Toronto
- Ted Morris Memorial Trophy: Tim Petros, Calgary
- Attendance: 18,324

The 19th Vanier Cup was played on November 19, 1983, at Varsity Stadium in Toronto, Ontario, and decided the CIAU football champion for the 1983 season. The Calgary Dinos won their first ever championship by defeating the Queen's Golden Gaels by a score of 31-21.
