= 52nd Vanier Cup =

2016 Canadian university gridiron football championship

Laval Rouge et Or	Calgary Dinos
(10–1)	(9–2)
31	26
Head coach: Glen Constantin	Head coach: Wayne Harris
	1	2	3	4	Total
Laval Rouge et Or	7	3	14	7	31
Calgary Dinos	14	3	3	6	26
- Date: November 26, 2016
- Stadium: Tim Hortons Field
- Location: Hamilton, ON
- Ted Morris Memorial Trophy: Hugo Richard, Laval
- Bruce Coulter Award: Cédric Lussier-Roy, Laval
- Kick-off: 1:00 PM EST
- Referee: K. Edgeworthy
- Halftime show: Tokyo Police Club
- Attendance: 7,115

Broadcasters
- Network: TV: Sportsnet, TVA Sports
- Announcers: Tim Micallef (play-by-play); Mike Morreale (analyst)
- Ratings: 243,000 on Sportsnet

The 2016 Vanier Cup (branded as the ArcelorMittal Dofasco Vanier Cup for sponsorship reasons), the 52nd edition of the Canadian university football championship, took place on Saturday, November 26, 2016 at Tim Hortons Field in Hamilton, Ontario. Hamilton was awarded both the 2016 and 2017 Vanier Cup games, respectively the fourth and fifth to be hosted by Hamilton.

The RSEQ Champion Laval Rouge et Or defeated the Canada West Champion Calgary Dinos by a score of 31–26. This was the tenth appearance in the Vanier Cup game for both programs, with Laval having now won nine titles and Calgary four.

== Teams ==
=== Calgary Dinos ===
Calgary finished second in the Canada West standings, and #6 in the final rankings. In the CW Semifinal, the Dinos easily defeated Saskatchewan, 47–17. Top-seeded Regina was upset by UBC in the Semifinal; and in the Hardy Trophy, Calgary scraped by the Thunderbirds, 46–43. In the Mitchell Bowl, Calgary dominated AUS Champion St. Francis Xavier in blustery conditions, 50–24.

=== Laval Rouge et Or ===
Perennial power Laval finished second in the RSEQ standings and #1 in the national rankings. After cruising against Concordia in the Conference Semifinal, 39–14, Laval would avenge its only regular season loss by beating Montreal, 20–17, to win the Dunsmore Cup. Laval then won the Uteck Bowl in dominating fashion, 36–6, over OUA Champion Wilfrid Laurier.

== Scoring summary ==
First Quarter
CGY - Michael Klukas 86 yard pass from Jimmy Underdahl (Niko Difonte convert failed), 00:30 (6–0 CGY)
CGY - Anthony Anderson 3 yard run (Niko Difonte convert), 04:18 (13–0 CGY)
CGY - Niko Difonte 0 rouge 4:21 (14–0 CGY)
LAV - Marc-Antonie Pivin 37 yard pass from Hugo Richard (Dominic Levesque convert) 9:26 (14–7 CGY)

Second Quarter
CGY - Niko Difonte 43 yard field goal, 2:56 (17–7 CGY)
LAV - Dominic Levesque 38 yard field goal, 5:18 (17–10 CGY)

Third Quarter
CGY - Niko Difonte 31 yard field goal 4:40 (20–10 CGY)
LAV - Anthony Auclair 5 yard pass from Hugo Richard (Dominic Levesque convert) 6:46 (20–17, CGY)
LAV - Vincent Alarie-Tardif 3 yard run (Dominic Levesque convert) 0:21 (24–20, LAV)

Fourth Quarter
CGY - Niko Difonte 31 yard field goal 11:55 (24–23, LAV)
CGY - Niko Difonte 29 yard field goal 8:12 (26–24, CGY)
LAV - Hugo Richard 1 yard run (Dominic Levesque convert) 2:33 (31–26, LAV)
