= 21st Vanier Cup =

1985 Canadian university football championship

Calgary Dinos	Western Mustangs
(6–2)	(6–1)
25	6
Head coach: Peter Connellan	Head coach: Larry Haylor
	1	2	3	4	Total
Calgary Dinos	0	0	0	25	25
Western Mustangs	0	0	0	6	6
- Date: November 30, 1985
- Stadium: Varsity Stadium
- Location: Toronto
- Ted Morris Memorial Trophy: Lew Lawrick, Calgary
- Attendance: 16,321

The 21st Vanier Cup was played on November 30, 1985, at Varsity Stadium in Toronto, Ontario, and decided the CIAU football champion for the 1985 season. The Calgary Dinos won their second championship by defeating the Western Mustangs by a score of 25-6.
