= 2015 CIS football season =

- Duration: August 30 – October 31
- Hardy Cup champions: UBC Thunderbirds
- Yates Cup champions: Guelph Gryphons
- Dunsmore Cup champions: Montreal Carabins
- Loney Bowl champions: St. Francis Xavier X-Men
- Mitchell Bowl champions: Montreal Carabins
- Uteck Bowl champions: UBC Thunderbirds

51st Vanier Cup
- Date: November 28
- Venue: Quebec City, Quebec
- Champions: UBC Thunderbirds

CIS football seasons seasons
- 2014 2016

The 2015 CIS football season began on August 30, 2015 with ten Ontario University Athletics teams playing that day. The season concluded on November 28 with the UBC Thunderbirds defeating the Montreal Carabins 26-23 in the 51st Vanier Cup championship at Telus Stadium in Quebec City. This year, 27 university teams in Canada played Canadian Interuniversity Sport football, the highest level of amateur Canadian football.

== Regular season standings ==
2015 Canada West standings
(Rank) Team	W		L	PF		PA	PTS	Playoff Spot
#1 Calgary	8	-	0	471	-	149	16	†
#6 UBC	6	-	2	281	-	239	12	X
#8 Manitoba	5	-	3	284	-	253	10	X
Saskatchewan	3	-	5	240	-	300	6	X
Alberta	2	-	6	183	-	356	4	
Regina	0	-	8	177	-	339	0	
† – Conference Champion; Rankings: CIS Top 10

2015 OUA standings
(Rank) Team	W		L	PF		PA	PTS	Playoff Spot
#2 Western	8	-	0	494	-	110	16	†
#5 Guelph	7	-	1	338	-	159	14	X
McMaster	6	-	2	355	-	211	12	X
#10 Carleton	5	-	3	288	-	224	10	X
Queen's	5	-	3	242	-	251	10	X
#9 Laurier	4	-	4	261	-	218	8	X
Toronto	3	-	5	300	-	331	6	
Ottawa	3	-	5	300	-	331	6	
Windsor	2	-	6	166	-	315	4	
York	1	-	7	121	-	367	2	
Waterloo	0	-	8	66	-	380	0	
† – Conference Champion; Rankings: CIS Top 10

2015 RSEQ standings
	Overall							Conf			Playoff Spot
(Rank) Team	W		L	PF		PA	PTS	W		L	Playoff Spot
#3 Laval	7	-	1	298	-	101	14	6	-	1	†
#4 Montreal	6	-	2	232	-	109	12	6	-	2	X
#7 Sherbrooke	5	-	3	216	-	153	10	4	-	3	X
Concordia	4	-	4	250	-	222	8	4	-	4	X
McGill	3	-	5	192	-	249	6	3	-	4	
Bishop's	1	-	7	89	-	319	2	0	-	7	
† – Conference Champion; Rankings: CIS Top 10

2015 AUS standings
	Overall							Conf			Playoff Spot
Team	W		L	PF		PA	PTS	W		L	Playoff Spot
Mount Allison	5	-	3	221	-	144	10	5	-	2	†
St. FX	5	-	3	172	-	179	10	5	-	2	X
Acadia	4	-	4	185	-	170	8	4	-	3	X
Saint Mary's	0	-	8	72	-	281	0	0	-	7	
† – Conference Champion; Rankings: CIS Top 10

=== Top 10 ===
FRC-CIS Top 10 Rankings
Team \ Week	1	2	3	4	5	6	7	8	9	10
Acadia Axemen	16 (3)	15 (3)	NR	10 (32)	12 (8)	NR	NR	NR	NR	NR
Alberta Golden Bears	NR	14 (3)	11 (31)	15 (4)	NR	13 (1)	13 (1)	NR	NR	NR
Bishop's Gaiters	NR	NR	NR	NR	NR	NR	NR	NR	NR	NR
Calgary Dinos	4 (213-1)	2 (241-6)	1 (274-13)	1 (292-26)	1 (295-28)	1 (299-29)	1 (298-28)	1 (296-27)	1 (285-24)	1 (296-26)
Carleton Ravens	NR	NR	13 (5)	12 (13)	NR	11 (7)	11 (8)	10 (22)	10 (12)	10 (43)
Concordia Stingers	13 (7)	NR	NR	14 (5)	15 (1)	NR	NR	12 (3)	12 (6)	11 (17)
Guelph Gryphons	6 (137)	5 (156-1)	5 (162)	5 (187)	5 (190)	7 (134)	7 (129)	7 (119)	5 (153)	5 (170)
Laurier Golden Hawks	NR	13 (4)	NR	NR	NR	NR	NR	NR	13 (5)	9 (51)
Laval Rouge et Or	2 (231-2)	1 (285-20)	2 (272-14)	2 (264-2)	2 (260-1)	2 (259-1)	2 (259-1)	4 (214)	3 (220-1)	3 (238)
Manitoba Bisons	10 (73)	6 (144)	7 (114)	8 (75)	6 (114)	8 (126)	8 (129)	8 (89)	8 (101)	8 (76)
McGill Redmen	NR	NR	NR	NR	NR	NR	NR	NR	NR	NR
McMaster Marauders	5 (148)	7 (144)	6 (144)	7 (112)	7 (113)	6 (143)	6 (149)	6 (145)	6 (120)	12 (9)
Montreal Carabins	1 (289-25)	4 (235)	4 (213)	4 (211)	4 (208)	4 (164)	4 (164)	3 (231)	4 (218)	4 (216)
Mount Allison Mounties	9 (79)	8 (52)	8 (86)	13 (5)	NR	NR	NR	NR	11 (11)	13 (4)
Ottawa Gee-Gees	14 (5)	12 (26)	12 (8)	9 (42)	11 (17)	NR	NR	NR	NR	NR
Queen's Golden Gaels	12 (9)	NR	14 (3)	16 (2)	13 (5)	10 (27)	10 (29)	11 (13)	NR	NR
Regina Rams	NR	NR	NR	NR	NR	NR	NR	NR	NR	NR
Saint Mary's Huskies	NR	NR	NR	NR	NR	NR	NR	NR	NR	NR
Saskatchewan Huskies	8 (87)	9 (43)	NR	NR	8 (82)	12 (3)	12 (2)	13 (1)	NR	NR
Sherbrooke Vert et Or	11 (10)	11 (35)	9 (48)	11 (32)	9 (69)	5 (147)	5 (150)	5 (160)	7 (108)	7 (126)
St. Francis Xavier X-Men	NR	16 (2)	NR	17 (2)	NR	NR	NR	NR	NR	14 (2)
Toronto Varsity Blues	NR	NR	NR	NR	NR	NR	NR	NR	NR	NR
UBC Thunderbirds	7 (109)	10 (41)	10 (39)	6 (123)	10 (46)	9 (89)	9 (77)	9 (88)	9 (95)	6 (134)
Waterloo Warriors	NR	NR	NR	NR	NR	NR	NR	NR	NR	NR
Western Mustangs	3 (226-2)	3 (239-3)	3 (253-3)	3 (244-2)	3 (244-1)	3 (247)	3 (250-1)	2 (267-3)	2 (261-4)	2 (270-4)
Windsor Lancers	NR	NR	NR	NR	NR	NR	NR	NR	NR	NR
York Lions	NR	NR	NR	NR	NR	NR	NR	NR	NR	NR

Ranks in italics are teams not ranked in the top 10 poll but received votes.
NR = Not ranked, received no votes.
Number in parentheses denotes number votes, after the dash number of first place votes.

== Post-season awards ==
CIS post-season awards
	Quebec	Ontario	Atlantic	Canada West	NATIONAL
Hec Crighton Trophy	Trenton Miller (Concordia)	Will Finch (Western)	Ashton Dickson (St. Francis Xavier)	Andrew Buckley (Calgary)	Andrew Buckley (Calgary)
Presidents' Trophy	Jonathan Boissonneault-Glaou (Montreal)	John Rush (Guelph)	Drew Morris (Acadia)	Robert Woodson (Calgary)	John Rush (Guelph)
J. P. Metras Trophy	Charles Vaillancourt (Laval)	Kwaku Boateng (Wilfrid Laurier)	Jesse St. James (Acadia)	David Onyemata (Manitoba)	David Onyemata (Manitoba)
Peter Gorman Trophy	Mathieu Betts (Laval)	Jesse Amankwaa (York)	Donovan Glave (Mount Allison)	Jamel Lyles (Manitoba)	Mathieu Betts (Laval)
Russ Jackson Award	Jérémi Roch (Sherbrooke)	Curtis Carmichael (Queen's)	Will Wojcik (Acadia)	DJ Lalama (Manitoba)	Curtis Carmichael (Queen's)
Frank Tindall Trophy	Glen Constantin (Laval)	Greg Marshall (Western)	Gary Waterman (St. Francis Xavier)	Wayne Harris Jr. (Calgary)	Wayne Harris Jr. (Calgary)

=== All-Canadian team ===
==== First team ====
Offence
QB – Andrew Buckley – Calgary
RB – Dillon Campbell – Laurier
RB – Mercer Timmis – Calgary
IR – Mitch Hillis – Saskatchewan
IR – Ian Stewart – Ottawa
WR – Rashaun Simonise – Calgary
WR – Daniel Vandervoort – McMaster
C – Sean McEwen – Calgary
G – Charles Vaillancourt – Laval
G – Sean Jamieson – Western
T – Braden Schram – Calgary
T – Jason Lauzon-Séguin – Laval
Defence
DT – David Onyemata – Manitoba
DT – Samuel Narkaj – Concordia
DE – Mathieu Betts – Laval
DE – Jesse St. James – Acadia
LB – John Rush – Guelph
LB – Drew Morris – Acadia
LB – Doctor Cassama – Calgary
FS – Jesse McNair – Western
HB – Robert Woodson – Calgary
HB – Maïko Zepeda – Montreal
CB – Godrey Onyeka – Laurier
CB – Adam Laurensse – Calgary
Special teams
P – Quinn van Gylswyk – British Columbia
K – Johnny Mark – Calgary
RET – Tunde Adeleke – Carleton

==== Second team ====
Offence
QB – Will Finch – Western
RB – Alex Taylor – Western
RB – Ashton Dickson – St. Francis Xavier
IR – Brian Jones – Acadia
IR – Jimmy Ralph – Alberta
WR – Yanic Lessard – Concordia
WR – Jacob Scarfone – Guelph
C – Matthew Van Praet – Western
G – Darius Ciraco – Calgary
G – Philippe Gagnon – Laval
T – Eddie Meredith – Western
T – Vernon Sainvil – St. Francis Xavier
Defence
DT – Donovan Dale – British Columbia
DT – Adam Melanson – Acadia
DE – Kwaku Boateng – Laurier
DE – Jonathan Boissonneault-Glaou – Montreal
LB – Shayne Gauthier – Laval
LB – Jake Heathcote – McMaster
LB – Micah Teitz – Calgary
FS – Kwame Adjei – Mount Allison
HB – Nicholas Parisotto – Guelph
HB – Mikaël Charland – Concordia
CB – Alex Hovington – Laval
CB – Devante Sampson – Mount Allison
Special teams
P – Félix Ménard-Brière – Montreal
K – Gabriel Ferraro – Guelph
RET – Jamel Lyles – Manitoba

== Championships ==
The Vanier Cup is played between the champions of the Mitchell Bowl and the Uteck Bowl, the national semi-final games. In 2015, according to the rotating schedule, the Canada West Hardy Trophy championship team will visit the Atlantic conference's Loney Bowl championship team for the Uteck Bowl. The winners of the Québec conference Dunsmore Cup will visit the Yates Cup Ontario championship team for the Mitchell Bowl.

=== Playoff bracket ===
Conference Quarter-finals
Carleton	39
Queen's	8
Bye
Guelph
Laurier	29
McMaster	15
Bye
Western

Conference Semi-finals
Manitoba	10
UBC	52
Saskatchewan	29
Calgary	37
Acadia	4
St. FX	26
Bye
Mount Allison
Sherbrooke	24
Montreal	31
Concordia	8
Laval	52
Carleton	21
Guelph	33
Laurier	18
Western	32

Conference Championships
UBC	34
Calgary	26
St. FX	14
Mount Allison	12
Montreal	18
Laval	16
Guelph	23
Western	17

National Semi-finals
UBC	36
St. FX	9
Montreal	25
Guelph	10

51st Vanier Cup
UBC	26
Montreal	23

The seed of the OUA Semi-Final is done so that the first-place team play the weakest team still alive.

== Teams ==
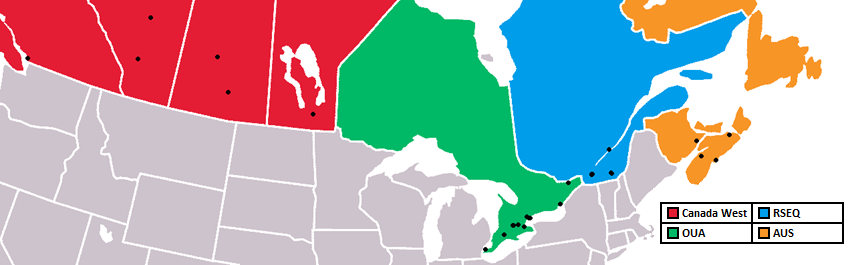

Canada West Football Conference Hardy Trophy
Institution	Team	City	Province	First season	Head coach	Enrollment	Endowment	Football stadium	Capacity	Hardy Trophies	Vanier Cups
University of British Columbia	Thunderbirds	Vancouver	BC	1923	Blake Nill	43,579	$1.01B	Thunderbird Stadium	3,500	14	3
University of Calgary	Dinos	Calgary	AB	1964	Wayne Harris Jr.	28,196	$444M	McMahon Stadium	35,650	15	4
University of Alberta	Golden Bears	Edmonton	AB	1910	Chris Morris	36,435	$751M	Foote Field	3,500	18	3
University of Saskatchewan	Huskies	Saskatoon	SK	1912	Brian Towriss	19,082	$136.7M	Griffiths Stadium	6,171	20	3
University of Regina	Rams	Regina	SK	1999	Mike Gibson	12,800	$25.9M	Mosaic Stadium at Taylor Field	32,848	1	0
University of Manitoba	Bisons	Winnipeg	MB	1920	Brian Dobie	27,599	$303M	Investors Group Field	33,422	11	3

Ontario University Athletics Yates Cup
Institution	Team	City	Province	First season	Head coach	Enrollment	Endowment	Football stadium	Capacity	Yates Cups	Vanier Cups
University of Windsor	Lancers	Windsor	ON	1968	Joe D'Amore	13,496	$32.5M	South Campus Stadium	2,000	1	0
University of Western Ontario	Mustangs	London	ON	1929	Greg Marshall	30,000	$266.6M	TD Stadium	10,000	30	6
University of Waterloo	Warriors	Waterloo	ON	1957	Chris Bertoia	27,978	$172M	Warrior Field	5,200	2	0
Wilfrid Laurier University	Golden Hawks	Waterloo	ON	1961	Michael Faulds	12,394	---	University Stadium	6,000	7	2
University of Guelph	Gryphons	Guelph	ON	1950	Stu Lang	19,408	$164.2M	Alumni Stadium	4,100	3	1
McMaster University	Marauders	Hamilton	ON	1901	Stefan Ptaszek	25,688	$498.5M	Ron Joyce Stadium	6,000	7	1
University of Toronto	Varsity Blues	Toronto	ON	1877	Greg Gary	73,185	$1.823B	Varsity Stadium	5,000	25	2
York University	Lions	Toronto	ON	1969	Warren Craney	42,400	$306M	York Stadium	2,500	0	0
Queen's University	Golden Gaels	Kingston	ON	1882	Pat Sheahan	20,566	$657M	Richardson Stadium	8,500	23	4
University of Ottawa	Gee-Gees	Ottawa	ON	1894	Jamie Barresi	35,548	$128.4M	Gee-Gees Field	4,152	4	2
Carleton University	Ravens	Ottawa	ON	1945	Steve Sumarah	25,890	$230M	Keith Harris Stadium	3,000	0	0

Réseau du sport étudiant du Québec Dunsmore Cup
Institution	Team	City	Province	First season	Head coach	Enrollment	Endowment	Football stadium	Capacity	Dunsmore Cups	Vanier Cups
Concordia University	Stingers	Montreal	QC	1974	Mickey Donovan	38,809	$54.4M	Concordia Stadium	4,000	3	0
Université de Montréal	Carabins	Montreal	QC	2002	Danny Maciocia	55,540	$89.5M	CEPSUM Stadium	5,100	2	1
McGill University	Redmen	Montreal	QC	1898	Ronald Hilaire	32,514	$973.6M	Molson Stadium	25,012	3	1
Université Laval	Rouge et Or	Quebec City	QC	1996	Glen Constantin	37,591	$105.3M	PEPS Stadium	12,257	12	8
Université de Sherbrooke	Vert et Or	Sherbrooke	QC	1971	David Lessard	35,000	---	Université de Sherbrooke Stadium	3,359	0	0
Bishop's University	Gaiters	Sherbrooke	QC	1884	Kevin Mackey	1,817	---	Coulter Field	2,200	4	0

Atlantic University Football Conference Jewett Trophy
Institution	Team	City	Province	First season	Head coach	Enrollment	Endowment	Football stadium	Capacity	Jewett Trophies	Vanier Cups
Acadia University	Axemen	Wolfville	NS	1957	Jeff Cummins	3,770	$40M	Raymond Field	3,000	12	2
Mount Allison University	Mounties	Sackville	NB	1955	Kelly Jeffrey	2,614	$110M	MacAulay Field	2,500	5	0
Saint Francis Xavier University	X-Men	Antigonish	NS	1954	Gary Waterman	4,871	$59.4M	Oland Stadium	4,000	11	1
Saint Mary's University	Huskies	Halifax	NS	1956	Perry Marchese	7,433	$16.9M	Huskies Stadium	4,000	24	3
