= Don Blair =

Canadian football player (born 1972)

No. 20
- Position: Wide receiver

Personal information
- Born: April 6, 1972 (age 54); Ottawa, Ontario, Canada
- Listed height: 6 ft 0 in (1.83 m)
- Listed weight: 195 lb (88 kg)

Career information
- College: Calgary
- CFL draft: 1996: 1st round, 1st overall pick

Career history
- 1996–1998: Edmonton Eskimos
- 1999–2001: BC Lions
- 2002–2003: Calgary Stampeders

Awards and highlights
- Grey Cup champion (2000); Lois and Doug Mitchell Award (1996); Hec Crighton Trophy (1995)

Donald Blair (born April 6, 1972) is a Canadian former professional football wide receiver who played eight seasons in the Canadian Football League (CFL) from 1996 to 2003 for the Edmonton Eskimos, BC Lions, and Calgary Stampeders. In his professional career, Blair had 310 catches for 4642 yards and 26 touchdowns. He was a member of the 2000 BC Lions team that won the 88th Grey Cup. He played CIS football for the Calgary Dinos where he won the Hec Crighton Trophy in 1995.
