= 55th Vanier Cup =

2019 Canadian university gridiron football championship

Calgary Dinos	Montreal Carabins
(9–2)	(9–2)
27	13
Head coach: Wayne Harris Jr.	Head coach: Danny Maciocia
	1	2	3	4	Total
Calgary Dinos	0	13	0	14	27
Montreal Carabins	0	7	3	3	13
- Date: November 23, 2019
- Stadium: Telus Stadium
- Location: Quebec City, QC
- Ted Morris Memorial Trophy: Adam Sinagra, Calgary
- Bruce Coulter Award: Redha Kramdi, Montreal
- Attendance: 8,376

Broadcasters
- Network: TV: CBC; TVA Sports
- Announcers: Mark Lee (play-by-play); Justin Dunk (analyst); Andi Petrillo (sideline reporter)

The 2019 Vanier Cup, the 55th edition of the Canadian university football championship, was played on November 23, 2019 at Telus Stadium in Quebec City, Quebec. This was the sixth time that Quebec City has hosted the Vanier Cup and the second consecutive year that it was hosted by Laval University.

The University of Calgary Dinos defeated the University of Montreal Carabins 27-13 to win their fifth Vanier Cup, and their first since 1995.

== Semi-finals ==
The Vanier Cup is played between the champions of the Mitchell Bowl and the Uteck Bowl, the national semi-final games. In 2019, according to the rotating schedule, the Canada West Hardy Trophy championship team will host the Yates Cup Ontario championship team for the Mitchell Bowl. The winners of the Atlantic conference's Loney Bowl will host the Québec conference Dunsmore Cup championship team for the Uteck Bowl. The Carabins of the Université de Montréal beat the Acadia Axemen 38-0 in the Uteck Bowl, and the Calgary Dinos defeated the McMaster Marauders 30-17 in the Mitchell Bowl.
