= Calgary Dinos =

Athletic teams of the University of Calgary in Canada

- University: University of Calgary
- Nickname: Dinos
- Association: U Sports
- Conference: Canada West
- Athletic director: Ben Matchett
- Location: Calgary, Alberta
- Varsity teams: 18 (6 men's, 7 women's, 5 co-ed)
- Football stadium: McMahon Stadium
- Basketball arena: Jack Simpson Gymnasium
- Ice hockey arena: David Bauer Arena
- Soccer stadium: Dinosaur Field
- Aquatics center: UCalgary Aquatic Centre
- Outdoor track and field venue: Jack Simpson Gymnasium
- Volleyball arena: Jack Simpson Gymnasium
- Rugby venue: McMahon Stadium
- Field hockey venue: Hawkings Field
- Colors: Red and gold
- Mascot: Rex
- Website: godinos.com
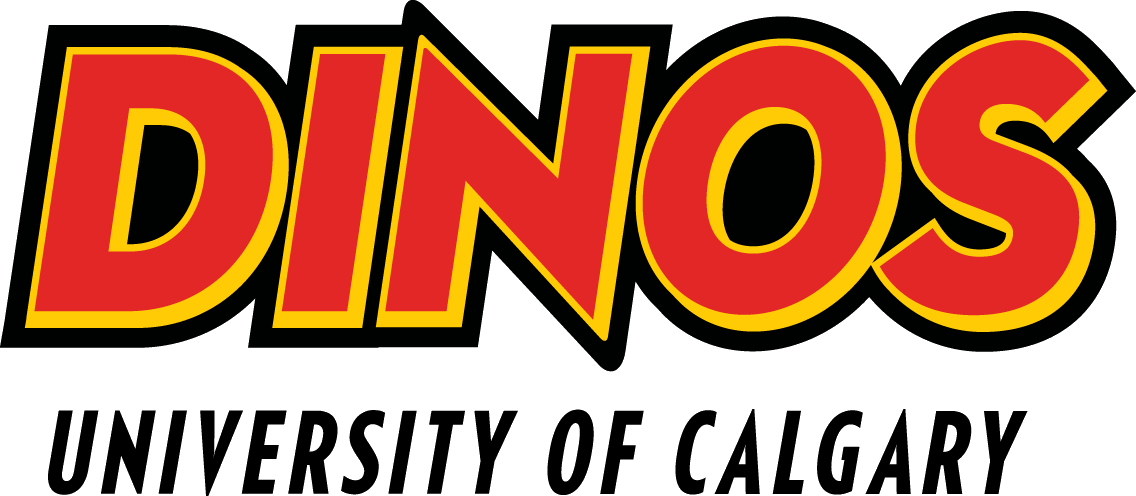

The Calgary Dinos are the athletic teams that represent the University of Calgary in Alberta, Canada. They were known as the "Dinosaurs" but usually referred to as the "Dinos" until 1999, when the name was officially shortened. Some of its venues are the Jack Simpson Gymnasium (basketball m/w, volleyball m/w, track and field m/w), McMahon Stadium (football, soccer m/w), Hawkings Field (field hockey), University of Calgary Aquatic Centre (swimming, often shortened to Aquatic Centre) and a 200m Running Track (cross-country and track & field practices).

The men's and women's hockey teams play at Father David Bauer Olympic Arena. Historically in the rare case of scheduling conflicts, both men's and women's hockey have used the Max Bell Centre for games.

== Varsity teams ==
Men's sports	Women's sports
Basketball	Basketball
Curling	Curling
Football	Field hockey
Ice hockey	Ice hockey
Soccer	Rugby
Volleyball	Soccer
	Volleyball
Co-ed sports
Cross country
Golf
Swimming
Track and field
Wrestling

=== Men's basketball ===
The Calgary Dinos men's basketball team has won nine Canada West conference championships, in 1966, 1976, 1993, 2004, 2009, 2016, 2018, 2019 and 2025. The team has won a national championship, which occurred in 2018. The team's head coach, Dan Vanhooren, has led the team since May 2000.

=== Women's basketball ===
The Calgary Dinos women's basketball team has won nine Canada West conference championships (most recently in 2026) and one national championships, in 1989.

=== Football ===
The Calgary Dinos football team has won 18 Canada West conference championships, including six consecutive from 2008 to 2013. The team has also won five national championships, in 1983, 1985, 1988, 1995, and 2019. The team is led by head coach Ryan Sheahan.

=== Men's ice hockey ===
The Calgary Dinos men's ice hockey team has won nine Canada West conference championships, in 1974, 1976, 1980, 1986, 1988, 1990, 1995, 1996, and 2023. The team has been led by Mark Howell since the 2009–10 season.

=== Women's ice hockey ===
The Calgary Dinos women's ice hockey team has won eight Canada West conference championships, in 1970, 1982, 1983, 1985, 1994, 2001, 2002, 2005, and 2018. The team has also won four national championships, in 1970, 1989, 1994, and 2004. The team's head coach, Christine Biggs, has led the team since January 2021.

=== Men's volleyball ===
The Calgary Dinos men's volleyball team has won nine Canada West conference championships, in 1973, 1978, 1982, 1989, 1991, 1992, 1993, 1994, and 2011. The team has also won four national championships, in 1982, 1989, 1993, and 2010. The team's head coach, Rod Durrant, has led the team since June 2006.

=== Women's volleyball ===
The Calgary Dinos women's volleyball team has won eight Canada West conference championships, in 1970, 1982, 1983, 1985, 1994, 2001, 2002, 2005, and 2018. The team has also won four national championships, in 1970, 1989, 1994, and 2004. The team's head coach, Christine Biggs, has led the team since January 2021.

== Club teams ==
Calgary Dinos club sports
Men's sports	Women's sports
Artistic swimming	Artistic swimming
Baseball	Fastball
Rowing	Ringuette
Rugby	Rowing
Skiing	Skiing
Tennis	Tennis

=== Ringette ===
The 2003–04 season marked the inaugural year for the Calgary Dinos university ringette team. The Dinos became Calgary's first university ringette team and proceeded to win the gold medal at the 2004 University Challenge Cup in Winnipeg for its inaugural appearance. The Canadian University and College Ringette Association (CUCRA) is responsible for organizing university and college ringette in Canada.

The addition of the Dinos team was considered a significant step in the development of ringette by aiding in the development of a national intercollegiate ringette league and also gave post-secondary aged players opportunities they never previously had. The University of Calgary team competed in the Ringette Calgary league in what was then the Deb/Intermediate division. The team was coached by Beth Veale, Bob Kerr and Bruce Hammond. Beth Veale was considered the individual who was largely responsible for getting the program off the ground and getting success.

==== University Challenge Cup record ====
(gold) : 2004, 2005, 2006, 2007, 2008, 2009, 2010, 2011, 2016, 2018, 2019, 2024

== Facilities ==
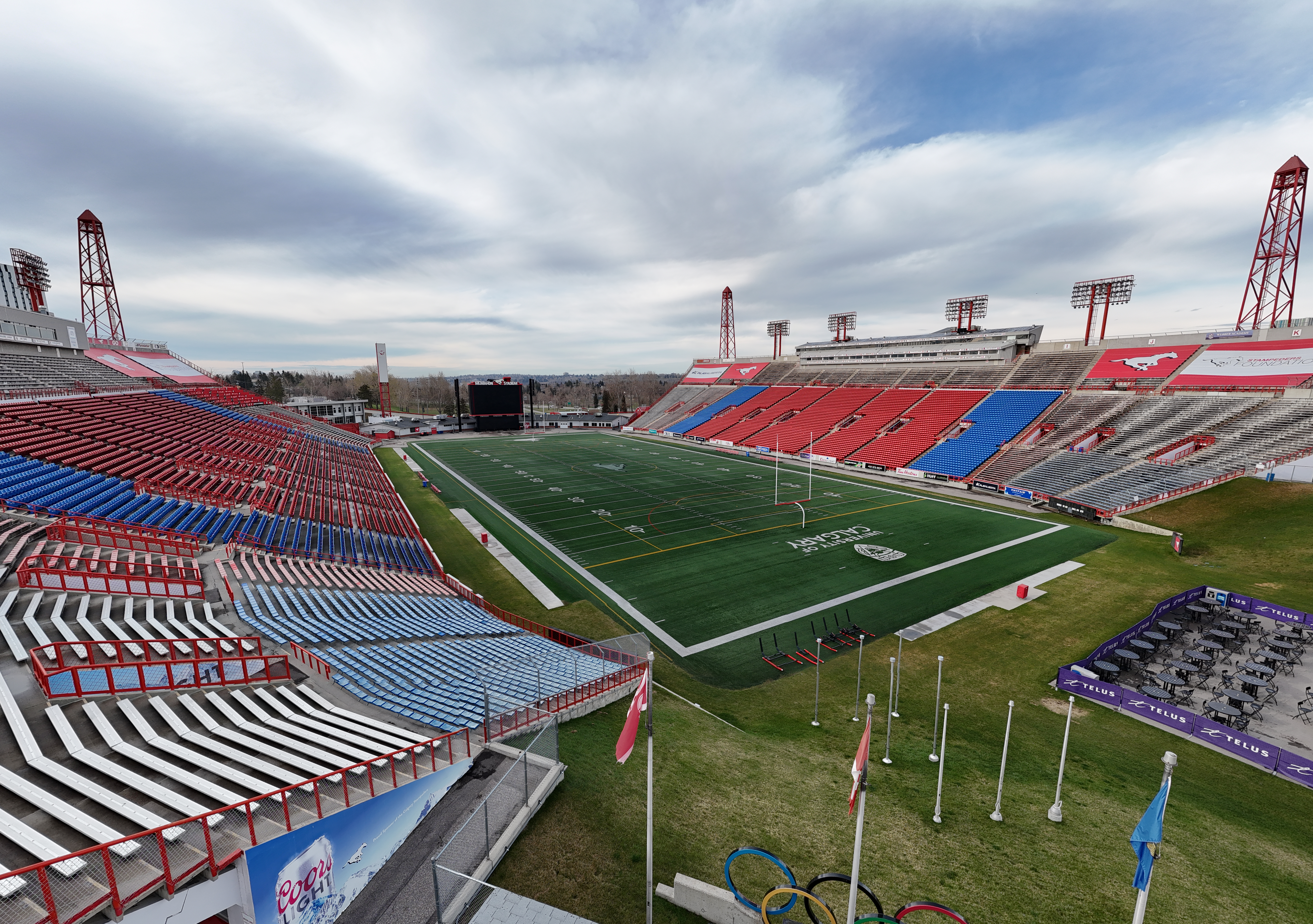
McMahon Stadium

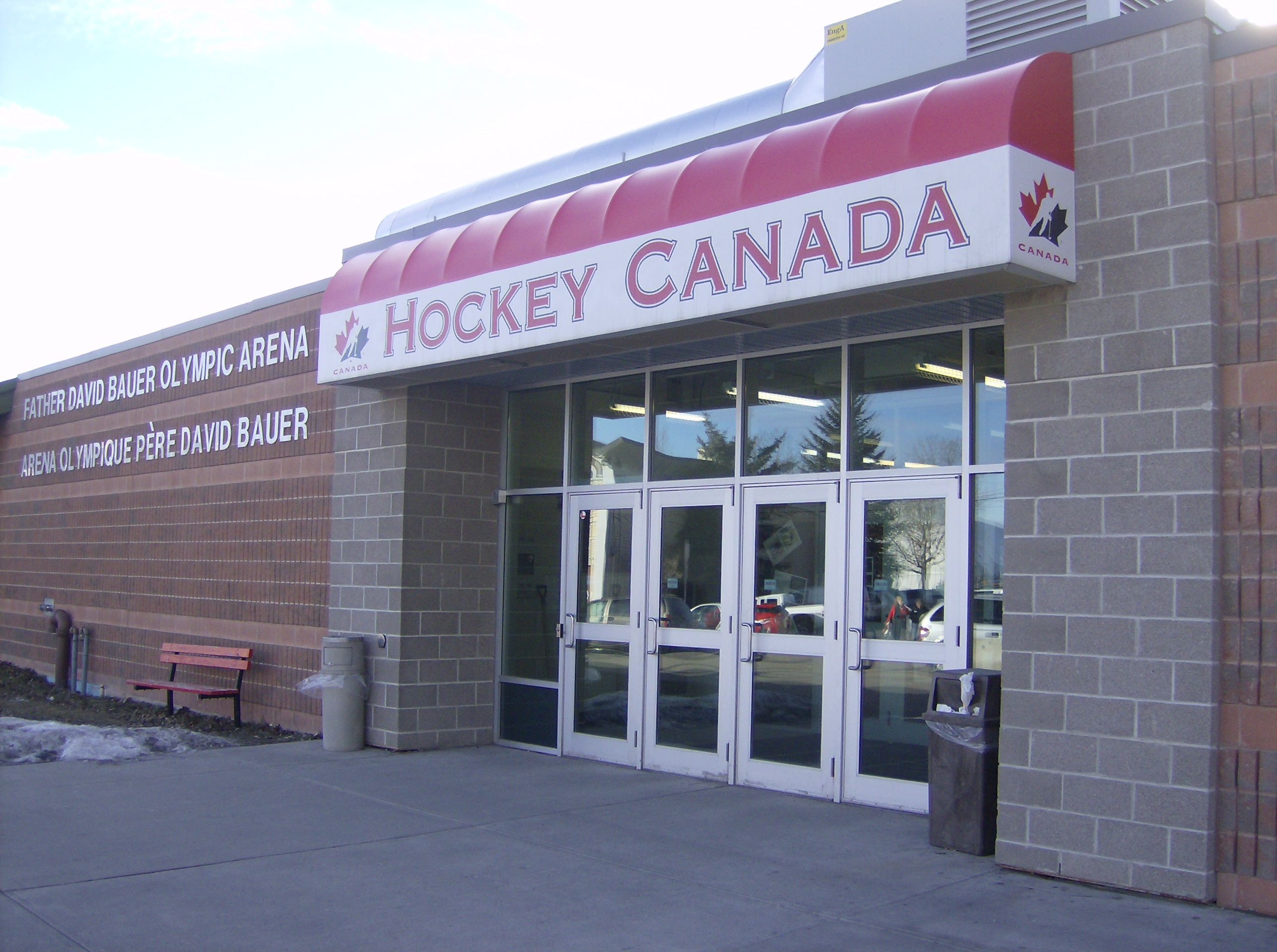
David Bauer Arena

Venue	Sport	Open.	Ref.
McMahon Stadium	Football; Rugby	1960	
Dinosaur Field	Soccer	2018	
Hawkings Field	Field hockey	2004	
Jack Simpson Gymnasium	Basketball; Volleyball; Track and field	1988	
David Bauer Arena	Ice hockey	1963	
Olympic Oval (Note: For recreational and training purposes. No university's varsity team uses it as home venue.)	Ice skating Ice hockey Running	1988	
UCalgary Aquatic Centre	Swimming	n/a	

== Awards and honours ==
=== Canada West Hall of Fame ===
- Hayley Wickenheiser, Ice Hockey: Canada West Hall of Fame - 2021 Inductee
- Jodi Evans, Basketball: Canada West Hall of Fame - 2021 Inductee
- Leighann Reimer, Basketball: Canada West Hall of Fame - 2020 Inductee
- Theresa Maxwell, Basketball: Canada West Hall of Fame - 2019 Inductee
- Stephanie Gawlinski, Soccer: Canada West Hall of Fame - 2019 Inductee
- Kathy Truscott, Soccer: Canada West Hall of Fame - 2019 Inductee
