= Peter Connellan =

Canadian football coach

Biographical details
- Born: 1936 or 1937 (age 89–90)

Coaching career (HC unless noted)
- 1964–1975: Viscount Bennett High School
- 1976: Central Memorial High School
- 1975–1976: University of Calgary (Asst.)
- 1977: University of Calgary (interim)
- 1980–1981: University of Calgary (Asst.)
- 1983–1995: University of Calgary
- 2004–2005: University of Calgary (OC)

Head coaching record
- Overall: 87–38–2 (.682)

Peter Connellan (born 1936 of 1937) is a retired Canadian football coach. He served as the head coach of the Calgary Dinos football team in 1977 and again from 1983 to 1995. He was also a professor in the Department of Physical Education at the University of Calgary.

== Coaching career ==
In 1964, Connellan became the head coach at Viscount Bennett High School in Calgary. In twelve seasons, he led the school to a 58–7 record and four city championships (1967, 1969, 1972, 1973). In 1976, he moved to Central Memorial High School. Connellan also served as an assistant at the University of Calgary during the 1975 and 1976 seasons.

In 1977, Connellan served as coach of the Calgary Dinos football team while head coach Mike Lashuk was on a year's sabbatical. He led Calgary to a 6–2 record and Canada West conference championship, but lost to Western in the Forest City Bowl. Connellan won the Frank Tindall Trophy, which is given to the Canadian Interuniversity Athletics Union football coach of the year. After the season, Connellan returned to the Calgary high school system, where he served as vice principal at William Aberhart High School. In 1980, Connellan returned to Calgary as the offensive backfield and receivers coach. He left after two seasons and became the principal of Robert Warren Junior High School.

Lashuk resigned after the 1982 season and Connellan was chosen to succeed him. Under Connellan's leadership, the Dinos secured Canada West championships in 1983, 1984, 1985, 1988, 1992, 1993, and 1995, as well as the Vanier Cup championship in 1983, 1985, 1988, and 1995. Connellan's achievements earned him induction into the Dinos' Hall of Fame in 2008, the Alberta Sports Hall of Fame in 1998, and the Canadian Football Hall of Fame in 2012.
