= Vanier Cup =

Canadian university gridiron football championship trophy

- Current season, competition or edition: 60th Vanier Cup
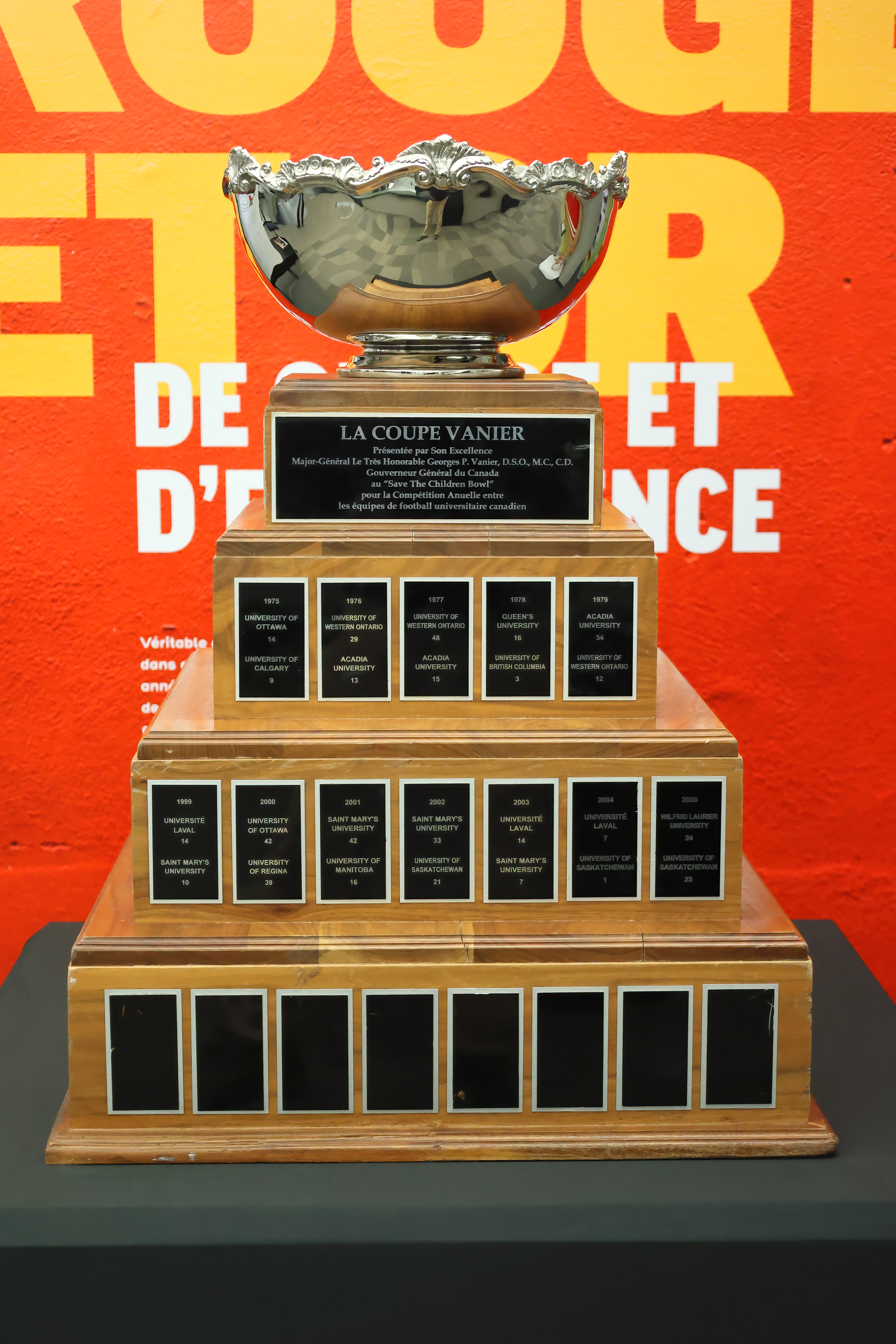
- Sport: Canadian football
- Founded: 1965; 61 years ago
- First season: 1965
- Organizing body: U Sports
- Country: Canada
- Most recent champion: Montreal Carabins (3rd title)
- Most titles: Laval Rouge et Or (12 titles)
- Website: usports.ca/en/championships/vanier-cup/m

The Vanier Cup (French: Coupe Vanier) is the trophy awarded annually to the champion Canadian football team in U Sports, the governing body for university sports in Canada. The U Sports football champion is determined in a one-game playoff (the Vanier Cup game), played by the winners of the Uteck Bowl and the Mitchell Bowl. In turn, the participating teams are determined by the winners of four bowl games: the Loney Bowl (AUS), Hardy Cup (Canada West), Jacques-Dussault Cup (RSEQ), and Yates Cup (OUA). The Vanier Cup game is played at a neutral site that changes every year; the hosting university is determined months or years in advance.

The Laval Rouge et Or have won the most Vanier Cups (12), while the Western Mustangs have the most appearances (15). Eighteen teams have won the Vanier Cup, while three others have played for the championship but never won. There are six active teams that have never appeared in the championship game. The most recent game was the 60th Vanier Cup game which was played on November 22, 2025, at Mosaic Stadium in Regina. The Montreal Carabins won their third championship in program history, defeating the Saskatchewan Huskies, 30–16.

== History ==
The Vanier Cup was created in 1965 as the championship trophy of the Canadian College Bowl. For the first two years of competition, the Canadian College Bowl was an invitational event, with a national panel selecting two teams to play, similar to other U.S. collegiate bowl games. In 1967, the Canadian College Bowl was declared the national football championship of the Canadian Intercollegiate Athletic Union, later Canadian Interuniversity Sport (CIS) and now U Sports, with a playoff system determining the two participants.

A 1991 program of the Vanier Cup, which featured the Wilfrid Laurier Golden Hawks and Mount Allison Mounties.

The Vanier Cup was played in Toronto, Ontario, from its inception in 1965 through 2003. However, after the CIS opened the game to host conference bids in 2001, the possibility arose to have games held outside Toronto. As of 2025, 41 of the 61 Vanier Cups have been played in Toronto, eight in Quebec City, five in Hamilton, two in Kingston, one in Regina (November 22, 2025), one in Saskatoon, one in Vancouver, one in London, Ontario, and one in Montreal. No games have been staged in the Atlantic region. Four times, the game has been played in the same city and during the same weekend as the Grey Cup: 1973, 2007 and 2012 in Toronto and in 2011 in Vancouver at BC Place Stadium.

The winners' trophy is named after Georges Vanier (governor general of Canada 1959–1967) and was first awarded in 1965 to the winner of an invitational event contested between two teams that were selected by a panel. In 1967, the trophy was declared the official "CIAU National Football Championship" and a playoff system was instituted. From its creation until 1982, it was known as the Canadian College Bowl. The game typically occurs in late November, although it is occasionally played in December.

On June 8, 2020, U Sports announced that all fall athletics championships for the 2020–21 season had been cancelled due to the COVID-19 pandemic.

== Results ==
The Vanier Cup raised in 1990 by the Saskatchewan Huskies following their win over Saint Mary's.

The Laurier Golden Hawks won the 2005 Vanier Cup, defeating Saskatchewan 24–23.

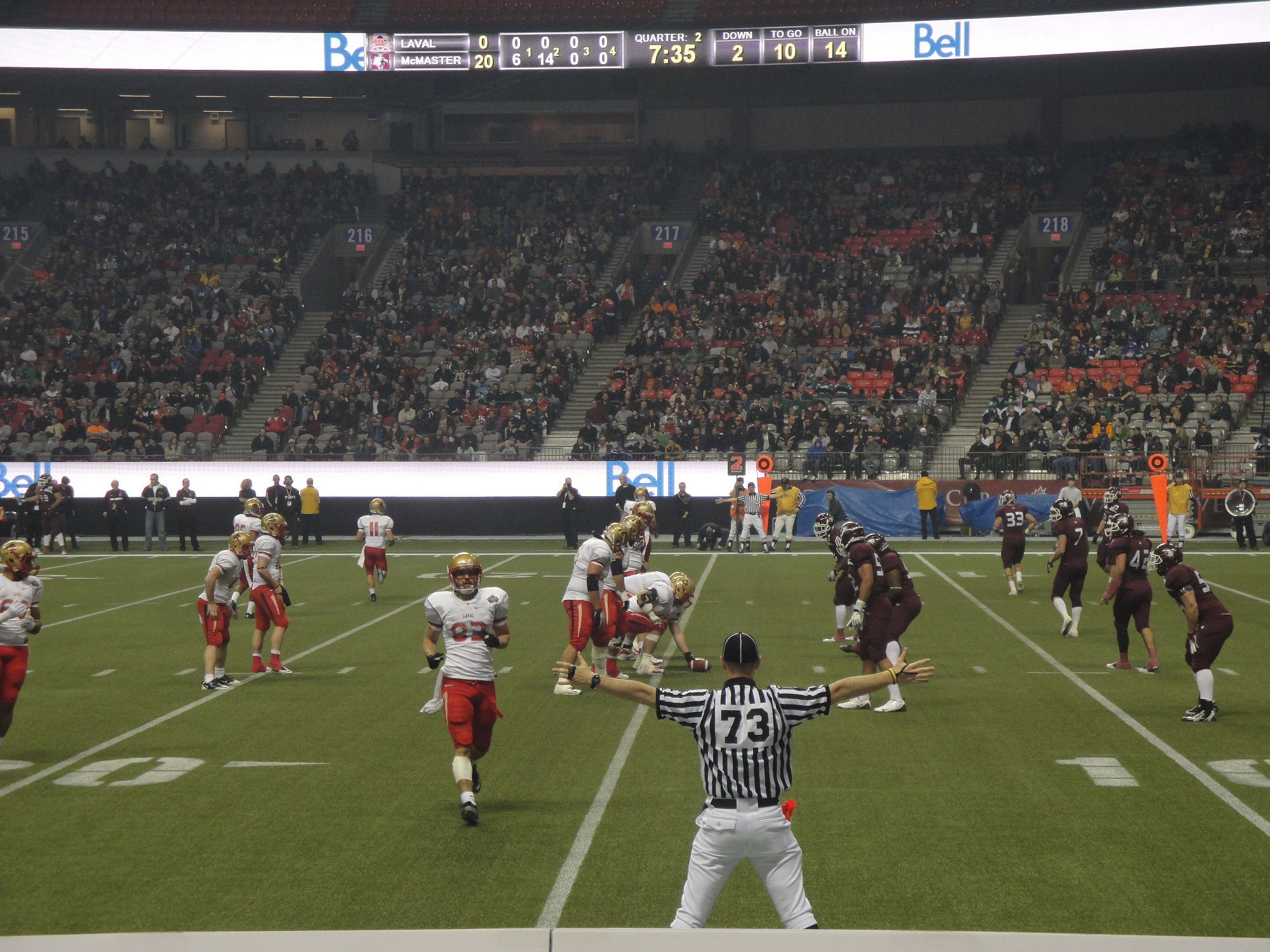
The Laval Rouge et Or vs. the McMaster Marauders in the 47th Vanier Cup.

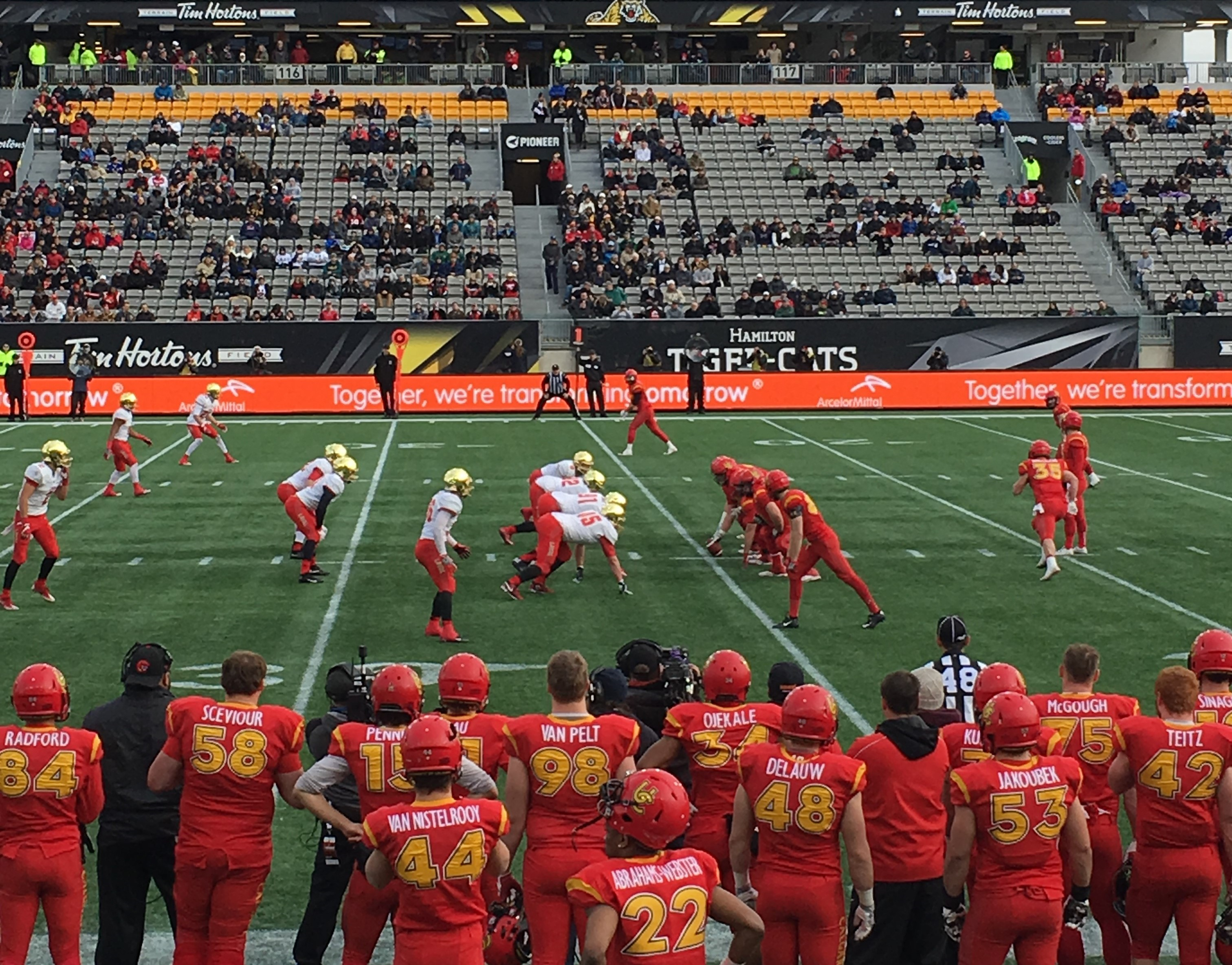
The Laval Rouge et Or vs. the Calgary Dinos in the 52nd Vanier Cup.

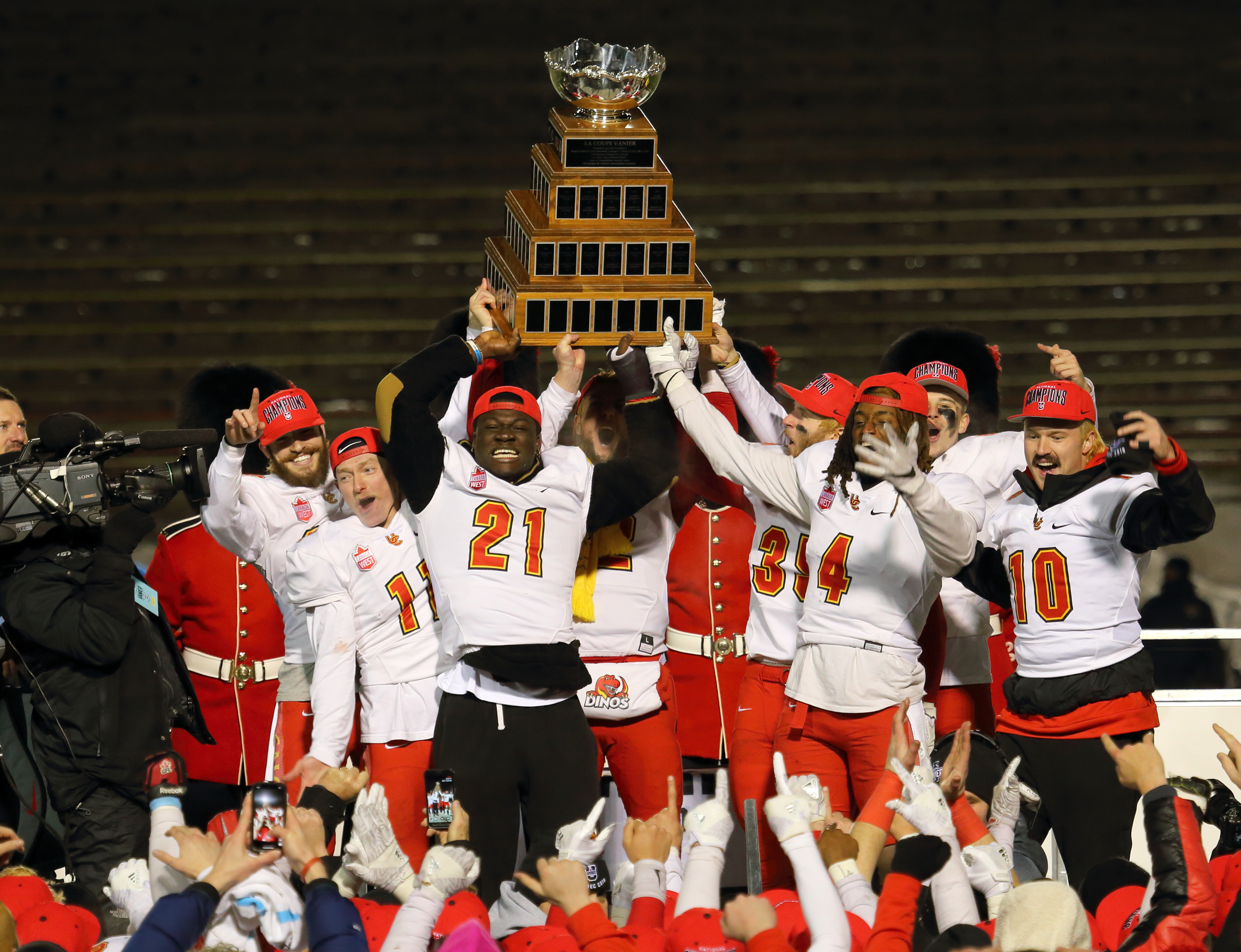
The Calgary Dinos hoist the Vanier Cup trophy following their win over the Montreal Carabins in 2019.

Key

- (#) Number of times that team has won the Vanier Cup.

Note: All Ted Morris Trophy and Bruce Coulter Award winners played for the winning team, unless otherwise noted.

Game	Date	Champion	Score	Runner up	Stadium	City	Ted Morris Memorial Trophy (Game MVP)	Bruce Coulter Award (starts in 1992)	Attendance
1st	November 20, 1965	Toronto	14–7	Alberta	Varsity Stadium	Toronto	Gerry Sternberg	—	3,488
2nd	November 19, 1966	St. F.X.	40–14	Waterloo Lutheran	Varsity Stadium	Toronto	Terry Gorman	—	13,678
3rd	November 25, 1967	Alberta	10–9	McMaster	Varsity Stadium	Toronto	Val Schneider	—	16,167
4th	November 22, 1968	Queen's	42–14	Waterloo Lutheran	Varsity Stadium	Toronto	Don Bayne	—	16,051
5th	November 21, 1969	Manitoba	24–15	McGill	Varsity Stadium	Toronto	Bob Kraemer	—	9,347
6th	November 21, 1970	Manitoba (2)	38–11	Ottawa	Varsity Stadium	Toronto	Mike Shylo	—	10,550
7th	November 20, 1971	Western	15–14	Alberta	Varsity Stadium	Toronto	Bob McGregor^{[A]}	—	13,041
8th	November 25, 1972	Alberta (2)	20–7	Waterloo Lutheran	Varsity Stadium	Toronto	Roger Comartin; Andy MacLeod^{[B]}	—	10,192
9th	November 24, 1973	Saint Mary's	14–6	McGill	Exhibition Stadium	Toronto	Ken Clark	—	17,000
10th	November 22, 1974	Western (2)	19–15	Toronto	Exhibition Stadium	Toronto	Ian Bryans	—	24,777
11th	November 21, 1975	Ottawa	14–9	Calgary	Exhibition Stadium	Toronto	Neil Lumsden	—	17,841
12th	November 19, 1976	Western (3)	29–13	Acadia	Varsity Stadium	Toronto	Bill Rozalowsky	—	20,300
13th	November 19, 1977	Western (4)	48–15	Acadia	Varsity Stadium	Toronto	Bill Rozalowsky	—	19,514
14th	November 18, 1978	Queen's (2)	16–3	British Columbia	Varsity Stadium	Toronto	Ed Andrew	—	19,124
15th	November 17, 1979	Acadia	34–12	Western	Varsity Stadium	Toronto	Don Ross	—	19,397
16th	November 29, 1980	Alberta (3)	40–21	Ottawa	Varsity Stadium	Toronto	Forrest Kennerd	—	11,000
17th	November 28, 1981	Acadia (2)	18–12	Alberta	Varsity Stadium	Toronto	Steve Repic	—	11,875
18th	November 20, 1982	British Columbia	39–14	Western	Varsity Stadium	Toronto	Glenn Steele	—	14,759
19th	November 19, 1983	Calgary	31–21	Queen's	Varsity Stadium	Toronto	Tim Petros	—	18,324
20th	November 24, 1984	Guelph	22–13	Mount Allison	Varsity Stadium	Toronto	Parri Ceci	—	16,321
21st	November 30, 1985	Calgary (2)	25–6	Western	Varsity Stadium	Toronto	Lew Lawrick	—	16,321
22nd	November 22, 1986	British Columbia (2)	25–23	Western	Varsity Stadium	Toronto	Eric Putoto	—	17,847
23rd	November 21, 1987	McGill	47–11	British Columbia	Varsity Stadium	Toronto	Michael Soles	—	14,326
24th	November 19, 1988	Calgary (3)	52–23	Saint Mary's	Varsity Stadium	Toronto	Sean Furlong	—	13,127
25th	November 18, 1989	Western (5)	35–10	Saskatchewan	SkyDome	Toronto	Tyrone Williams	—	32,847
26th	November 24, 1990	Saskatchewan	24–21	Saint Mary's	SkyDome	Toronto	David Earl	—	26,846
27th	November 30, 1991	Wilfrid Laurier	25–18	Mount Allison	SkyDome	Toronto	Andy Cecchini	—	28,645
28th	November 21, 1992	Queen's (3)	31–0	Saint Mary's	SkyDome	Toronto	Brad Elberg	Eric Dell	28,645
29th	November 20, 1993	Toronto (2)	37–34	Calgary	SkyDome	Toronto	Glenn McCausland	Rob Schrauth^{[C]}	20,211
30th	November 19, 1994	Western (6)	50–40 (OT)	Saskatchewan	SkyDome	Toronto	Brent Schneider^{[D]}	Xavier Lafont	28,652
31st	November 25, 1995	Calgary (4)	54–24	Western	SkyDome	Toronto	Don Blair	Rob Richards	29,178
32nd	November 30, 1996	Saskatchewan (2)	31–12	St. F.X.	SkyDome	Toronto	Brent Schneider	Warren Muzika	14,577
33rd	November 22, 1997	British Columbia (3)	39–23	Ottawa	SkyDome	Toronto	Stewart Scherck	Mark Nohra	8,184
34th	November 28, 1998	Saskatchewan (3)	24–17	Concordia	SkyDome	Toronto	Trevor Ludtke	Doug Rozon	15,157
35th	November 27, 1999	Laval	14–10	Saint Mary's	SkyDome	Toronto	Stéphane Lefebvre	Francesco Pepe Esposito	12,595
36th	December 2, 2000	Ottawa (2)	42–39	Regina	SkyDome	Toronto	Phill Côté	Scott Gordon	18,209
37th	December 1, 2001	Saint Mary's (2)	42–16	Manitoba	SkyDome	Toronto	Ryan Jones	Kyl Morrison	19,138
38th	November 23, 2002	Saint Mary's (3)	33–21	Saskatchewan	SkyDome	Toronto	Steve Panella	Joe Bonaventura	17,179
39th	November 22, 2003	Laval (2)	14–7	Saint Mary's	SkyDome	Toronto	Jeronimo Huerta-Flores	Philippe Audet	17,828
40th	November 27, 2004	Laval (3)	7–1	Saskatchewan	Ivor Wynne Stadium	Hamilton	Matthew Leblanc	Matthieu Proulx	14,227
41st	December 3, 2005	Wilfrid Laurier (2)	24–23	Saskatchewan	Ivor Wynne Stadium	Hamilton	Ryan Pyear	David Montoya	16,827
42nd	November 25, 2006	Laval (4)	13–8	Saskatchewan	Griffiths Stadium	Saskatoon	Éric Maranda	Samuel Grégoire-Champagne	12,567
43rd	November 23, 2007	Manitoba (3)	28–14	Saint Mary's	Rogers Centre	Toronto	Mike Howard	John Makie	26,787
44th	November 22, 2008	Laval (5)	44–21	Western	Ivor Wynne Stadium	Hamilton	Julian Féoli-Gudino	Marc-Antoine L. Fortin	13,873
45th	November 28, 2009	Queen's (4)	33–31	Calgary	Stade du PEPS	Quebec City	Danny Brannagan	Chris Smith	18,628
46th	November 27, 2010	Laval (6)	29–2	Calgary	Stade du PEPS	Quebec City	Sébastien Levesque	Marc-Antoine Beaudoin-Cloutier	16,237
47th	November 25, 2011	McMaster	41–38 (2OT)	Laval	BC Place	Vancouver	Kyle Quinlan	Aram Eisho	24,935
48th	November 23, 2012	Laval (7)	37–14	McMaster	Rogers Centre	Toronto	Maxime Boutin	Arnaud Gascon-Nadon	37,098
49th	November 23, 2013	Laval (8)	25–14	Calgary	Stade Telus	Quebec City	Pascal Lochard	Vincent Desloges	18,543
50th	November 29, 2014	Montréal	20–19	McMaster	Molson Stadium	Montreal	Regis Cibasu	Anthony Coady	22,649
51st	November 28, 2015	British Columbia (4)	26–23	Montréal	Stade Telus	Quebec City	Michael O'Connor	Stavros Katsantonis	12,557
52nd	November 26, 2016	Laval (9)	31–26	Calgary	Tim Hortons Field	Hamilton	Hugo Richard	Cédric Lussier-Roy	7,115
53rd	November 25, 2017	Western (7)	39–17	Laval	Tim Hortons Field	Hamilton	Chris Merchant	Fraser Sopik	10,754
54th	November 24, 2018	Laval (10)	34–20	Western	Stade Telus	Quebec City	Hugo Richard	Adam Auclair	12,380
55th	November 23, 2019	Calgary (5)	27–13	Montréal	Stade Telus	Quebec City	Adam Sinagra	Redha Kramdi	8,376
2020 game cancelled due to 2019 coronavirus pandemic									
56th	December 4, 2021	Western (8)	27–21	Saskatchewan	Stade Telus	Quebec City	Evan Hillock	Daniel Valente	5,840
57th	November 26, 2022	Laval (11)	30–24	Saskatchewan	Western Alumni Stadium	London	Kevin Mital	Charles-Alexandre Jacques	8,420
58th	November 25, 2023	Montréal (2)	16–9	British Columbia	Richardson Memorial Stadium	Kingston	Jonathan Sénécal	Nicky Farinaccio	7,109
59th	November 23, 2024	Laval (12)	22–17	Wilfrid Laurier	Richardson Memorial Stadium	Kingston	Felipe Forteza	Arnaud Desjardins	9,500
60th	November 22, 2025	Montréal (3)	30–16	Saskatchewan	Mosaic Stadium	Regina	Pepe Gonzalez	Loui-Philippe Gauthier	8,896
61st	November 28, 2026				Stade Telus	Quebec City			
62nd	November 27, 2027				Stade Telus	Quebec City			

A. Bob McGregor, Ted Morris Trophy winner in 1971, played for the runner-up team.
B. In the 1972 game, the Vanier Cup Committee and Canadian Interuniversity Athletic Union officials decided to crown co-winners from the same school.
C. Rob Schrauth, Bruce Coulter Award winner in 1993, played for the runner-up team.
D. Brent Schneider, Ted Morris Trophy winner in 1994, played for the runner-up team.

== Appearances by team ==
Key
OUA	Ontario University Athletics
RSEQ	Réseau du sport étudiant du Québec
CanWest	Canada West Universities Athletic Association
AUS	Atlantic University Sport
OQIFC	Ontario-Quebec Intercollegiate Football Conference 1980–2000

Appearances	Team	Hometown	Conference	Wins	Losses	Win %	Most Recent Appearance
15	Western Mustangs	London, Ontario	OUA	8	7	.533	2021
14	Laval Rouge et Or	Quebec City, Quebec	RSEQ/OQIFC	12	2	.857	2024
12	Saskatchewan Huskies	Saskatoon, Saskatchewan	CanWest	3	9	.250	2025
11	Calgary Dinos	Calgary, Alberta	CanWest	5	6	.455	2019
9	Saint Mary's Huskies	Halifax, Nova Scotia	AUS	3	6	.333	2007
7	UBC Thunderbirds	Vancouver, British Columbia	CanWest	4	3	.571	2023
6	Alberta Golden Bears	Edmonton, Alberta	CanWest	3	3	.500	1981
6	Wilfrid Laurier Golden Hawks^{[E]}	Waterloo, Ontario	OUA	2	4	.333	2024
5	Montréal Carabins	Montreal, Quebec	RSEQ	3	2	.600	2025
5	Queen's Gaels	Kingston, Ontario	OUA/OQIFC	4	1	.800	2009
5	Ottawa Gee-Gees	Ottawa, Ontario	OUA/OQIFC	2	3	.400	2000
4	Manitoba Bisons	Winnipeg, Manitoba	CanWest	3	1	.750	2007
4	Acadia Axemen	Wolfville, Nova Scotia	AUS	2	2	.500	1981
4	McMaster Marauders	Hamilton, Ontario	OUA	1	3	.250	2014
3	Toronto Varsity Blues	Toronto, Ontario	OUA	2	1	.667	1993
3	McGill Redbirds	Montreal, Quebec	RSEQ/OQIFC	1	2	.333	1987
2	St. Francis Xavier X-Men	Antigonish, Nova Scotia	AUS	1	1	.500	1996
2	Mount Allison Mounties	Sackville, New Brunswick	AUS	0	2	.000	1991
1	Guelph Gryphons	Guelph, Ontario	OUA	1	0	1.000	1984
1	Concordia Stingers	Montreal, Quebec	RSEQ/OQIFC	0	1	.000	1998
1	Regina Rams	Regina, Saskatchewan	CanWest	0	1	.000	2000

E. The Wilfrid Laurier record includes three games played as Waterloo Lutheran.

Six active teams have never played for the Vanier Cup: Bishop's Gaiters (AUS/RSEQ/OQIFC), Carleton Ravens (OUA), Sherbrooke Vert-et-Or (RSEQ), Waterloo Warriors (OUA), Windsor Lancers (OUA), and York Lions/Yeomen (OUA).

== Awards ==
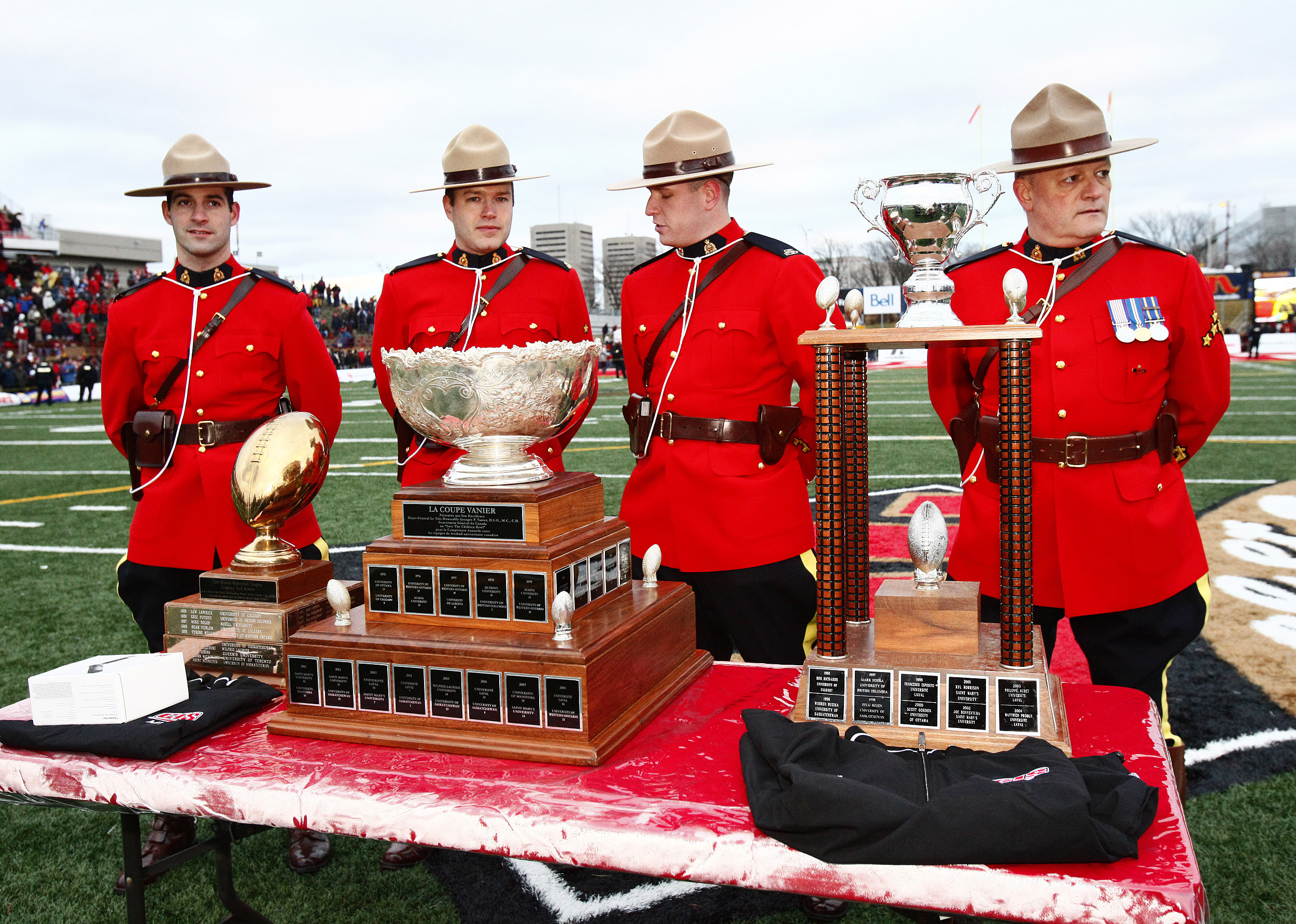
From left to right, The Ted Morris Trophy, Vanier Cup and Bruce Coulter Trophy at the 2009 Vanier Cup at PEPS Stadium in Quebec City.

The Vanier Cup's most valuable player is awarded the Ted Morris Memorial Trophy. It was first awarded at the first championship in 1965 and named in honour of Teddy Morris, who died the same year. Morris, a Hall of Fame former Toronto Argonauts player and coach, was an organizer of the first bowl and champion for developing Canadian players.

The Bruce Coulter Award was first awarded in 1992 and is dependent on what position the winner of the Ted Morris Trophy played. If the winner is from the offence, then the Bruce Coulter Award winner will be the most outstanding defensive player or vice versa. It was named after Bruce Coulter, long-time Head Coach of the Bishop's Gaiters and former offensive and defensive player with the Montreal Alouettes in the 1950s. Coulter was inducted as a builder in the Canadian Football Hall of Fame in 1997.

== Broadcasting ==
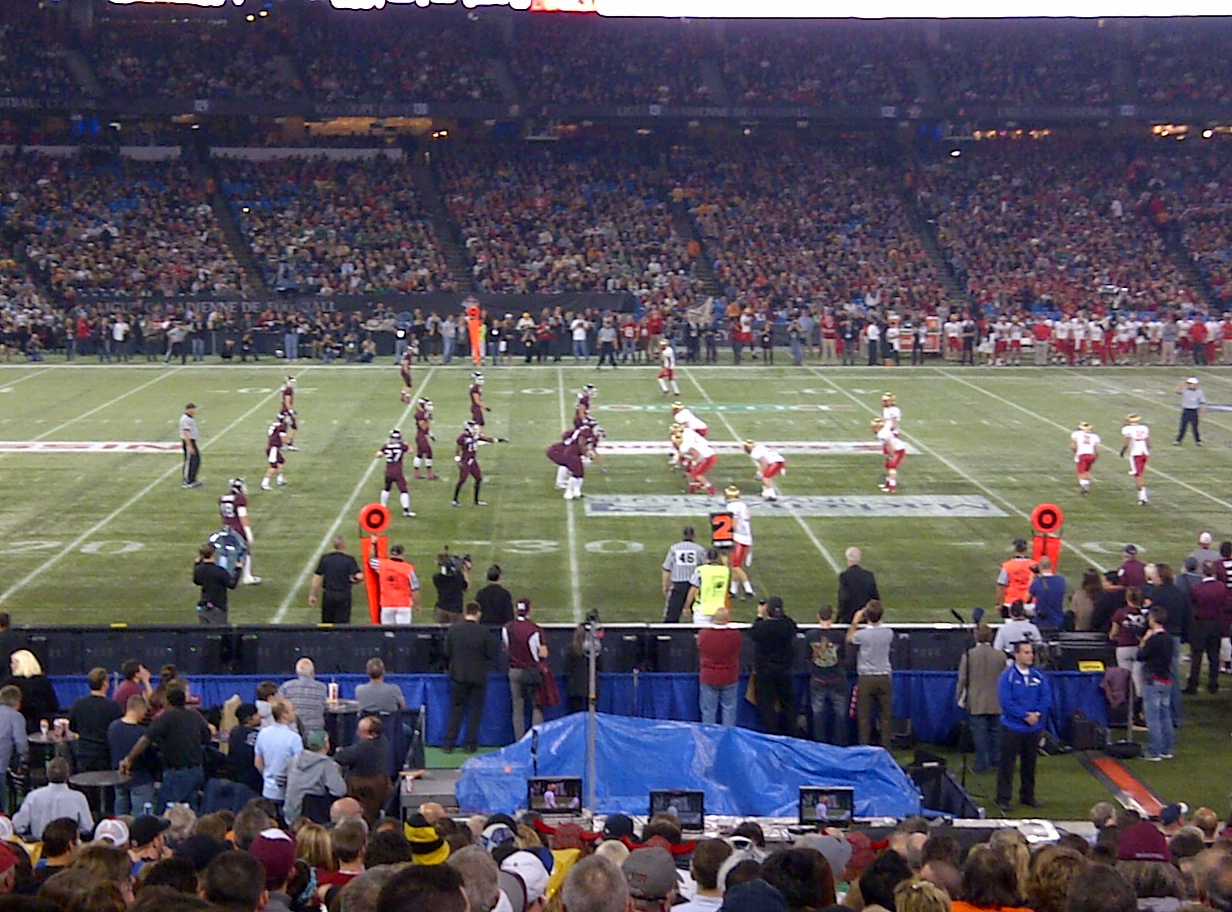
The 48th Vanier Cup was the most watched and highest attended Vanier Cup game.

The Vanier Cup final game is regularly broadcast nationally. From 1965 though 1976 it was broadcast on CBC Television, from 1977 through 1988 it was broadcast on the CTV Television Network. In 1989, TSN acquired rights to the game, lasting through to 2012 (besides a one-year stint on The Score in 2008).

In November 2010, the rights to the Vanier Cup were purchased by sports marketing company MRX. The 2011 game was held in Vancouver, on the same weekend as the 99th Grey Cup and for the first time it was fully integrated into the Grey Cup Festival as a festival event.

In 2012, the 48th Vanier Cup, played between Laval and McMaster at Rogers Centre in Toronto became both the most attended and most watched Vanier Cup ever. Held the same weekend and in the same city as the 100th Grey Cup, the game was attended by 37,098. The previous record was set in 1989 at the 25th Vanier Cup, when 32,847 watched the game between Western and Saskatchewan that was also played at SkyDome (now Rogers Centre). The game, broadcast on TSN and RDS was watched by 910,000.

In February 2013, the CIS terminated the option years on their agreement with MRX opting for an open bid process for the hosting of the game. Laval University, in Quebec City, was the only bidder for the game and won the right to host the 49th Vanier Cup. In May, CIS terminated its agreement with TSN, and entered into a six-year deal with Sportsnet to broadcast its championships, including the Vanier Cup.

The switch in venues, the decoupling of the Vanier Cup from Grey Cup week, and the change in broadcaster, led to a precipitous drop in attendance and viewership. A total of 301,000 viewers watched Laval defeat the Calgary Dinos 25–14 Saturday, November 23, 2013, which was a decline of 64 per cent from the previous year. A standing room crowd of 18,543 were on hand at the Telus Stadium which was a decline of 50 per cent from the previous year in Toronto (although a sellout in that venue). In 2019, after several more years of declines, the Vanier Cup returned to CBC.

== See also ==
- College Football Playoff National Championship
- NCAA Division I FCS Football Championship
- College football
