= 1997 CIAU football season =

- Duration: August 27, 1997 – November 1, 1997
- Hardy Cup champions: UBC Thunderbirds
- Yates Cup champions: Waterloo Warriors
- Dunsmore Cup champions: Ottawa Gee-Gees
- Loney Bowl champions: Mount Allison Mounties
- Atlantic Bowl champions: Ottawa Gee-Gees
- Churchill Bowl champions: UBC Thunderbirds

Vanier Cup
- Date: November 22, 1997
- Venue: SkyDome, Toronto
- Champions: UBC Thunderbirds

CIAU football seasons seasons
- 1996 1998

The 1997 CIAU football season began on August 27, 1997, and concluded with the 34th Vanier Cup national championship on November 22, 1997, at the SkyDome in Toronto, Ontario, with the UBC Thunderbirds winning the third Vanier Cup championship in program history. Twenty-four universities across Canada competed in CIAU football this season, the highest level of amateur play in Canadian football, under the auspices of the Canadian Interuniversity Athletics Union (CIAU).

== Regular season ==
=== Standings ===
Note: GP = Games Played, W = Wins, L = Losses, T = Ties, PF = Points For, PA = Points Against, Pts = Points

Atlantic
Team	GP	W	L	PF	PA	Pts
**StFX**	8	7	1	190	120	14
**Mount Allison**	8	5	3	190	136	10
Acadia	8	3	5	211	213	6
Saint Mary's	8	1	7	121	243	2

Ontario-Quebec
Team	GP	W	L	PF	PA	Pts
**Queen's**	8	6	2	183	106	12
**Ottawa**	8	6	2	163	157	12
**Concordia**	8	5	3	202	171	10
**McGill**	8	4	4	125	143	8
Bishop's	8	3	5	136	114	6
Laval	8	3	5	130	190	6
Carleton	8	1	7	106	174	2

Ontario
Team	GP	W	L	T	PF	PA	Pts
**Western**	8	6	1	1	250	146	13
**Waterloo**	8	6	2	0	231	91	12
**York**	8	6	2	0	209	129	12
**Guelph**	8	6	2	0	207	117	12
Laurier	8	3	5	0	181	212	6
McMaster	8	2	5	1	151	256	5
Toronto	8	2	6	0	112	220	0
Windsor	8	0	8	0	100	270	0

Canada West
Team	GP	W	L	T	PF	PA	Pts
**UBC**	8	5	2	1	195	130	11
**Calgary**	8	5	2	1	273	220	11
Saskatchewan	8	5	3	0	183	156	10
Manitoba	8	3	5	0	163	246	6
Alberta	8	1	7	0	136	198	2

Teams in bold earned playoff berths.

- Bishop's forfeited wins over Laval, McGill, and Concordia.

== Post-season awards ==
=== Award-winners ===
- Hec Crighton Trophy – Mark Nohra, British Columbia
- Presidents' Trophy – Jason Van Geel, Waterloo
- Russ Jackson Award – Sam Stetsko, Alberta
- J. P. Metras Trophy – Mike Kushnir, St. Francis Xavier
- Peter Gorman Trophy – Paul Carty, St. Francis Xavier
- Frank Tindall Trophy – John Stevens, St. Francis Xavier

=== All-Canadian team ===
Offence
	First Team	Second Team
Quarterback	Darryl Leason (Calgary)	Nathan Body (Guelph)
Running Back	Mark Nohra (British Columbia); Jarrett Smith (Waterloo)	Craig Carr (Manitoba); Jeff Johnson (York)
Inside Receiver	Ousmane Tounkara (Ottawa); Ryan Carruthers (Calgary)	Andre Arlain (St. Francis Xavier); Scott Miller (Windsor)
Outside Receiver	Aubrey Cummings (Acadia); Andre Batson (York)	Brad Coutts (British Columbia); Ryan Janzen (McMaster)
Centre	Jim Cooper (British Columbia)	Jim Weeks (Carleton)
Guard	Samir Chahine (McGill); Sam Stetsko (Alberta)	Stephen Szimanski (Waterloo); Kip Zavitz (Guelph)
Tackle	Bob Beveridge (British Columbia); Paul Blenkhorn (Western Ontario)	Scott Flory (Saskatchewan); Dan Sendecki (Waterloo)

Defence
	First Team	Second Team
Defensive Tackle	Mike Kushnir (St. Francis Xavier); Jeff Anderson (Concordia)	Rob McMurren (Waterloo); Craig Alloway (Alberta)
Defensive End	Josh Thomas (Acadia); Roger Dunbrack (Western Ontario)	Mike Milo (Saskatchewan); George Psofimis (York)
Linebacker	Jason van Geel (Waterloo); Robert Smith (Bishop's); Warren Muzika (Saskatchewan)	Francis Bellefroid (Bishop's); Derek Krete (Western Ontario); Kevin Pressburger (Waterloo)
Free Safety	William Loftus (Manitoba)	Jason Kralt (Carleton)
Defensive Halfback	Bernard Gravel (Laval); Mike Crumb (Saskatchewan)	N/A
Cornerback	Jason Hutchins (Alberta); Mark Raphael (Ottawa)	Todd MacKay (Western Ontario); Philippe Girard (Mount Allison)

Special Teams
	First Team	Second Team
Kicker	Arek Bigos (Waterloo)	Matt Kellett (Saskatchewan)
Punter	Dave Miller-Johnston (Concordia)	Matt Kellett (Saskatchewan)

== Post-season ==
=== Playoff bracket ===
Conference Semi-finals
Concordia Stingers	20
Ottawa Gee-Gees	25
McGill Redmen	7
Queen's Gaels	10
York Yeomen	0
Waterloo Warriors	17
Guelph Gryphons	10
Western Ontario Mustangs	25

Conference Championships
Calgary Dinos	21
UBC Thunderbirds	39
Mount Allison Mounties	20
St. Francis Xavier X-Men	17
Queen's Gaels	7
Ottawa Gee-Gees	24
Waterloo Warriors	30
Western Ontario Mustangs	10

National Semi-finals
UBC Thunderbirds	34
Mount Allison Mounties	29
Waterloo Warriors	37
Ottawa Gee-Gees	44

33rd Vanier Cup
Ottawa Gee-Gees	23
UBC Thunderbirds	39

=== Championships ===
The Vanier Cup was played between the champions of the Atlantic Bowl and the Churchill Bowl, the national semi-final games. This year, the Canada West Hardy Trophy champion UBC Thunderbirds defeated the Loney Bowl champion Mount Allison Mounties in the Atlantic Bowl in Halifax, Nova Scotia by a score of 34–29. The Dunsmore Cup Ontario-Quebec champion Ottawa Gee-Gees were the host team for the Churchill Bowl and they defeated the Ontario conference's Yates Cup championship team, Waterloo Warriors 44–37. In the 33rd Vanier Cup game, the Thunderbirds were led by Hec Crighton Trophy winner Mark Nohra, who had 30 carries for 178 yards and one touchdown as UBC defeated Ottawa 39–23 at the SkyDome in Toronto.
