= UBC Thunderbirds football =

University Canadian football team

UBC Thunderbirds
- UBC Thunderbirds logo
- First season: 1923; 103 years ago
- Athletic director: Kavie Toor
- Head coach: Blake Nill; 11th year, 49–37–0 (.570)
- Other staff: Khari Jones (OC), Pat Tracey (DC)
- Home stadium: Thunderbird Stadium
- Year built: 1967
- Stadium capacity: 3,411
- Stadium surface: Polytan LigaTurf
- Location: UBC Point Grey Campus, British Columbia (Note: The main campus of UBC is located on an unincorporated area just outside the city limits of Vancouver.)
- League: U Sports
- Conference: CWUAA (1972–present)
- Past associations: Western Intercollegiate Football League, Western Intercollegiate Football Union, Evergreen Football League
- All-time record: –
- Postseason record: –

Titles
- Vanier Cups: 4; 1982, 1986, 1997, 2015
- Uteck Bowls: 1; 2015
- Mitchell Bowls: 1; 2023
- Churchill Bowls: 3; 1978, 1986, 1987
- Atlantic Bowls: 2; 1982, 1997
- Hardy Cups: 18; 1929, 1931, 1933, 1938, 1939, 1945, 1959, 1961, 1962, 1976, 1978, 1982, 1986, 1987, 1997, 2015, 2023, 2026
- Hec Crighton winners: 3 Jordan Gagner, Mark Nohra, Billy Greene
- Colours: Blue and Gold
- Fight song: Hail U.B.C.
- Outfitter: Adidas
- Rivals: Calgary Dinos; Simon Fraser Red Leafs
- Website: gothunderbirds.ca/football

The UBC Thunderbirds football team represents the University of British Columbia athletics teams in U Sports and is based in Vancouver, British Columbia. The Thunderbirds program has won the CWUAA Hardy Trophy conference championship 17 times, which is third all-time among competing teams. On a national level, the team has won the Vanier Cup championship four times, in 1982, 1986, 1997 and, most recently, in 2015. The team has also lost twice in the title game, in 1978 and 1987. The Thunderbirds program has also yielded three Hec Crighton Trophy winners: Jordan Gagner in 1987, Mark Nohra in 1997, and, most recently, Billy Greene in 2011.

== History ==
The Thunderbirds began their history playing in the British Columbia Rugby Football Union, competing in every season from 1926 to 1940 with the exception of 1935. During their time in the BCRFU they won 3 league championships. Thunderbirds was adopted as the official name of the team in 1934. Following the dissolution of the BCRFU, UBC competed only against other collegiate teams. Due to WW2, the team went on a hiatus from 1943-45. In 1946, they joined the Pacific Northwest Athletic Conference, and played against American teams. They had a dismal 3-35-2 record in the PNAC before switching to the Evergreen Conference in 1953.

In 1959 they switched back to Canadian competition by joining the Western Canada Football League. After a few years in the WCFL, the Thunderbirds withdrew, officially only playing in exhibition games against other western teams. This lasted from 1964 to 66, before they rejoined. Exhibition games against American opponents continued.

The first Shrum Bowl was played in 1967, against SFU. The Clan won 32-13. In 1978 the Thunderbirds made it to their first national championship game, against Queen's. The Golden Gaels beat them 16-3. Four years later, the Thunderbirds had made it back to the title game, this time their opposition was the Western Mustangs. UBC reigned supreme in 1982, beating Western 39-14 to win their first national championship.

== Recent history ==
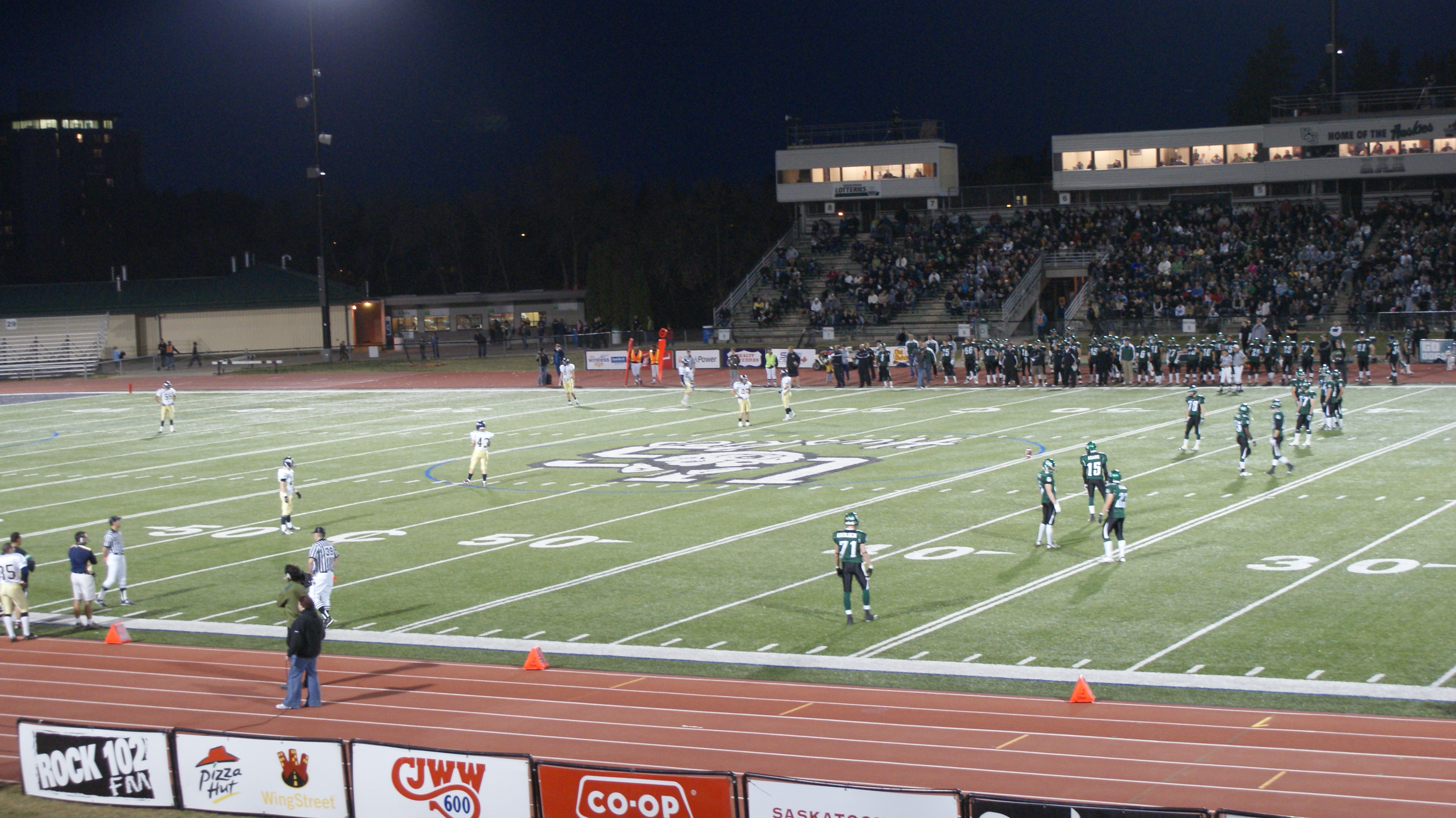
UBC v Saskatchewan game in 2008

Following four straight seasons of playoff drought from 2007 to 2010, UBC finished with a 6–2 record in 2011 earning second place in the Canada West with an appearance in the Hardy Cup. Quarterback Billy Greene would also become the third Thunderbird to win the Hec Crighton Award that year. However, all team accolades would be for naught as an ineligible student-athlete, who played in all eight games, would force UBC to forfeit all six regular season wins as well as its post-season results from that year. The school was fined and the program was placed on probation for the following season. This seemed to halt any progress that was made as the team finished 2–6 for the 2012 season and out of the playoffs for the fifth time in six years.

In 2013, the team bounced back with a 4–4 regular season record led by a solid defense and running back Brandon Deschamps, who was one of only three running backs in Canada to rush for more than 1,000 yards. They would lose in the Canada West semifinal to the eventual Mitchell Bowl champion Calgary Dinos 42–28. The program would regress again in 2014 as they finished with another 2–6 record and out of the playoffs.

During the following off-season in 2015, UBC Athletics would draw the Dinos head coach, Blake Nill away from the Calgary Dinos in what was the most high-profile coaching change that year. Nill's impact was immediate as he was able to recruit quarterback Michael O'Connor, who was the ranked the sixth best quarterback by ESPN among the 2014 recruiting class. The Thunderbirds achieved a turnaround in Nill's debut season at the UBC helm to finish the 2015 regular season with a 6–2 record, placing second in the CWUAA standings. During the ensuing post-season drive of three straight single-elimination playoff games on the road, UBC upset the heavily favoured Calgary Dinos in the Hardy Cup game at Calgary; then defeated the St. Francis Xavier X-Men to earn its historical first Uteck Bowl victory at Antigonish, to advance to the national title game. In the 51st Vanier Cup championship, the Thunderbirds narrowly defeated the defending CIS champion Montreal Carabins, by scoring the game's last possession field goal to end the fourth quarter. The victory was UBC's fourth Vanier Cup overall, tying the Calgary Dinos for the all-time record among CWUAA member universities.

== Rivalries ==
Competing against the cross-town Simon Fraser University, the Thunderbirds and Simon Fraser Clan previously shared a long-standing local rivalry, which had been dormant since 2010. That year, SFU left the CIS for the NCAA's Division II Great Northwest Athletic Conference. These two teams did not play within the same governing bodies until 2002 (SFU played, prior to then, in the NAIA while UBC has always competed in U Sports), they would compete in an annual match-up known as the Shrum Bowl, named after Gordon Shrum. After SFU's realignment to NCAA Division II was confirmed, it seemed as though the annual match-up would be decommissioned. However, the two teams went on to renew the Shrum Bowl game as a one-off exhibition on October 8, 2010, at Thunderbird Stadium playing Canadian rules. After years of conflicts in their respective competition schedules, the two teams played again in 2022. While another game was scheduled for 2023, it was ultimately cancelled as SFU cancelled their football program in April 2023.

== Recent regular season results ==
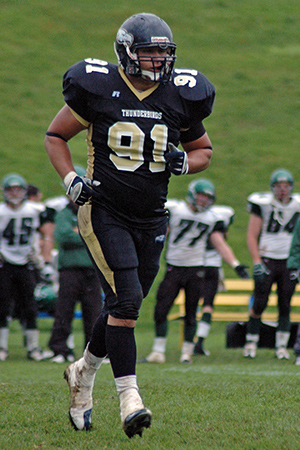
Thunderbird player Sean Ortiz in 2007

Season	G	W	L	T	PCT	PF	PA	Standing	Playoffs
1997	8	5	2	1	688	195	130	1st in CW	Defeated Calgary Dinos in Hardy Cup 39–21; Defeated Mount Allison Mounties in Atlantic Bowl 34–29; Defeated Ottawa Gee-Gees in 33rd Vanier Cup 39–23
1998	8	6	2	0	0.750	262	151	2nd in CW	Lost to Saskatchewan Huskies in Hardy Cup 31–28
1999	8	7	1	0	0.875	227	131	1st in CW	Defeated Calgary Dinos in CWUAA semi-final 27–14; Lost to Saskatchewan Huskies in Hardy Cup 31–24
2000	8	3	5	0	0.375	206	231	4th in CW	Lost to Manitoba Bisons in CWUAA semi-final 14–4
2001	8	2	6	0	0.250	132	233	5th in CW	Out of Playoffs
2002	8	3	5	0	0.250	144	141	5th in CW	Out of Playoffs
2003	8	0	8	0	0.000	132	260	7th in CW	Out of Playoffs
2004	8	5	3	–	0.625	235	212	3rd in CW	Lost to Saskatchewan Huskies in CWUAA semi-final 39-0
2005	8	4	4	–	0.500	210	200	4th in CW	Lost to Saskatchewan Huskies in CWUAA semi-final 32-6
2006	8	4	4	–	0.500	287	209	3rd in CW	Lost to Saskatchewan Huskies in CWUAA semi-final 35–16
2007	8	3	5	–	0.375	167	198	5th in CW	Out of Playoffs
2008	8	2	6	–	0.250	117	160	6th in CW	Out of Playoffs
2009	8	3	5	–	0.375	110	263	5th in CW	Out of Playoffs
2010	8	2	6	–	0.250	164	255	6th in CW	Out of Playoffs
2011^{[A]}	8	0	8	–	0.000	58	72	2nd in CW	Defeated Saskatchewan Huskies in CWUAA semi-final 27–22; Lost to Calgary Dinos in Hardy Cup 62–13; Playoff results forfeited
2012	8	2	6	–	0.250	193	297	5th in CW	Out of Playoffs
2013	8	4	4	–	0.500	256	215	4th in CW	Lost to Calgary Dinos in CWUAA semi-final 42–28
2014	8	2	6	–	0.250	175	293	6th in CW	Out of Playoffs
2015	8	6	2	–	0.750	289	239	2nd in CW	Defeated Manitoba Bisons in CWUAA semi-final 52-10; Defeated Calgary Dinos in Hardy Cup 34–26; Defeated St. Francis Xavier X-Men in Uteck Bowl 36–9; Defeated Montreal Carabins in 51st Vanier Cup 26–23
2016	8	3	5	–	0.375	250	245	4th in CW	Defeated Regina Rams in CWUAA semi-final 40–34; Lost to Calgary Dinos in Hardy Cup 46–43
2017	8	6	2	–	0.750	231	172	2nd in CW	Defeated Regina Rams in CWUAA semi-final 28–21; Lost to Calgary Dinos in Hardy Cup 44–43
2018	8	5	3	–	0.625	174	190	2nd in CW	Lost to Saskatchewan Huskies in CWUAA semi-final 31–28 (OT)
2019	8	2	6	–	0.250	163	311	6th in CW	Out of Playoffs
2020	Season cancelled due to COVID-19 pandemic								
2021	6	3	3	–	0.500	135	221	4th in CW	Lost to Saskatchewan Huskies in CWUAA semi-final 39–17
2022	8	4	4	–	0.500	182	186	3rd in CW	Defeated Regina Rams in CWUAA semi-final 28–14; Lost to Saskatchewan Huskies in Hardy Cup 23–9
2023	8	6	2	–	0.750	271	156	1st in CW	Defeated Manitoba Bisons in CWUAA semi-final 29–21; Defeated Alberta Golden Bears in Hardy Cup 28–27; Defeated St. Francis Xavier X-Men in Mitchell Bowl 47–17; Lost to Montreal Carabins in 58th Vanier Cup 16–9
2024	8	5	3	–	0.625	216	222	2nd in CW	Lost to Saskatchewan Huskies in CWUAA semi-final 38–33
2025	8	3	5	–	0.375	168	245	4th in CW	Lost to Saskatchewan Huskies in CWUAA semi-final 26–7
2026	8	6	2	–	0.750	244	161	1st in CW	Defeated Manitoba Bisons in CWUAA semi-final 30–23; Defeated Regina Rams in Hardy Cup 41–39 (2OT); Lost to Montreal Carabins in Uteck Bowl 30–13

A. In 2011, due to an administrative sanction, UBC retroactively forfeited its six regular season wins. UBC's ensuing post-season games were also removed from record by the Canada West Universities Athletic Association, citing UBC Athletics' submission of an erroneous eligibility declaration regarding one of its active roster players.

== National postseason results ==
=== Vanier Cup Era (1965–present) ===
Year	Game	Opponent	Result
1976	Churchill Bowl	Western	L 8–30
1978	Churchill Bowl; Vanier Cup	Laurier; Queen's	W 25–16; L 3–16
1982	Atlantic Bowl; Vanier Cup	St. FX; Western	W 54–1; W 39–14
1986	Churchill Bowl; Vanier Cup	Bishop's; Western	W 32–30; W 25–23
1987	Churchill Bowl; Vanier Cup	Laurier; McGill	W 33–31; L 11–47
1997	Atlantic Bowl; Vanier Cup	Mount Allison; Ottawa	W 34–29; W 39–23
2015	Uteck Bowl; Vanier Cup	St. FX; Montreal	W 36–9; W 26–23
2023	Mitchell Bowl; Vanier Cup	St. FX; Montreal	W 47–17; L 9–16
2026	Uteck Bowl	Montreal	L 13–30

UBC is 7–2 in national semi-final games and 4–3 in the Vanier Cup.

== Head coaches ==
Name	Tenure
Gordon Burke	1923–1936
Maury Van Vliet	1937–1941
John Farina	1942
No team	1943–1944
Greg Kabat	1945–1947
Don Wilson	1948
Orville Burke	1949–1950
Hjalmer “Jelly” Anderson	1951–1952
Don Coryell	1953–1954
Frank Gnup	1955–1972
Norm Thomas	1973
Frank Smith	1974–1994
Casey Smith	1995–1997
Dave Johnson	1998
Jay Prepchuk	1999–2001
Laurent DesLauriers	2002–2005
Ted Goveia	2006–2009
Shawn Olson	2010–2014
Blake Nill	2015–present

== Awards and honours ==
=== National award winners ===
- Hec Crighton Trophy: Jordan Gagner (1987), Mark Nohra (1997), Billy Greene (2011)
- J. P. Metras Trophy: Tyson St. James (1999), Theo Benedet (2022, 2023)
- Presidents' Trophy: Mike Emery (1981, 1982), Mark Norman (1986)
- Peter Gorman Trophy: Glen Steele (1981)
- Russ Jackson Award: Nathan Beveridge (2004)
- Frank Tindall Trophy: Frank Smith (1978, 1987)

=== UBC Awards ===
- Michael O'Connor 2016 UBC Thunderbirds Male Athlete of the Year Co-winner
- 2016 du Vivier UBC Team of the Year Award

==== UBC Hall of Fame ====
- 2016 inductee: Jordan Gagner, Quarterback
- 2021 inductee: Akbal Singh

== Thunderbirds in the CFL ==
As of the start of the 2026 CFL season, 13 Thunderbirds alumni were active in the Canadian Football League, having transitioned to professional football:

- Ryan Baker, Hamilton Tiger-Cats
- Luke Burton-Krahn, Edmonton Elks
- Gavin Coakes, Toronto Argonauts
- Skyler Griffith, Edmonton Elks
- Chase Henning, BC Lions
- Ben Hladik, BC Lions
- Bradley Hladik, Edmonton Elks
- Ronan Horrall, Hamilton Tiger-Cats
- Arvin Hosseini, Hamilton Tiger-Cats
- Stavros Katsantonis, Hamilton Tiger-Cats
- Isaiah Knight, Edmonton Elks
- Lake Korte-Moore, Saskatchewan Roughriders
- Benjamin Sangmuah, Edmonton Elks
- Dakoda Shepley, Toronto Argonauts

As of the start of the 2026 NFL season, two former UBC players are on NFL teams' rosters:

- Theo Benedet, Chicago Bears
- Giovanni Manu, Detroit Lions
