= 1998 CIAU football season =

- Duration: September 2, 1998 – November 7, 1998
- Hardy Cup champions: Saskatchewan Huskies
- Yates Cup champions: Western Mustangs
- Dunsmore Cup champions: Concordia Stingers
- Loney Bowl champions: Acadia Axemen
- Atlantic Bowl champions: Concordia Stingers
- Churchill Bowl champions: Saskatchewan Huskies

Vanier Cup
- Date: November 28, 1998
- Venue: SkyDome, Toronto
- Champions: Saskatchewan Huskies

CIAU football seasons seasons
- 1997 1999

The 1998 CIAU football season began on September 2, 1998, and concluded with the 34th Vanier Cup national championship on November 28, 1998, at the SkyDome in Toronto, Ontario, with the Saskatchewan Huskies winning the third Vanier Cup championship in program history. Twenty-four universities across Canada competed in CIAU football this season, the highest level of amateur play in Canadian football, under the auspices of the Canadian Interuniversity Athletics Union (CIAU). This year would be the last for the Carelton Ravens until their re-establishment in 2013 as the program was discontinued in 1998.

== Regular season ==
=== Standings ===
Note: GP = Games Played, W = Wins, L = Losses, T = Ties, PF = Points For, PA = Points Against, Pts = Points

Atlantic
Team	GP	W	L	PF	PA	Pts
**Mount Allison**	8	6	2	219	142	12
**Acadia**	8	5	3	206	168	10
Saint Mary's	8	4	4	153	161	8
StFX	8	1	7	112	219	2

Ontario-Quebec
Team	GP	W	L	PF	PA	Pts
**Concordia**	8	6	2	233	141	12
**Ottawa**	8	6	2	267	184	12
**Laval**	8	4	4	181	156	8
**Bishop's**	8	4	4	189	193	8
McGill	8	4	4	110	166	8
Queen's	8	3	5	208	170	6
Carleton	8	1	7	102	280	2

Ontario
Team	GP	W	L	T	PF	PA	Pts
**Western**	8	8	0	0	295	139	16
**Waterloo**	8	7	1	0	297	150	14
**Laurier**	8	5	3	0	248	155	10
**McMaster**	8	4	4	0	278	254	8
Guelph	8	3	4	1	134	211	7
York	8	3	5	0	118	155	6
Windsor	8	1	6	1	87	275	3
Toronto	8	0	8	0	103	226	0

Canada West
Team	GP	W	L	T	PF	PA	Pts
**Saskatchewan**	8	6	2	0	226	168	12
**UBC**	8	6	2	0	262	151	12
Calgary	8	4	4	0	261	175	8
Alberta	8	4	4	0	232	217	8
Manitoba	8	0	8	0	142	314	0

Teams in bold earned playoff berths.

== Post-season awards ==
=== Award-winners ===
- Hec Crighton Trophy – Éric Lapointe, Mount Allison
- Presidents' Trophy – Warren Muzika, Saskatchewan
- Russ Jackson Award – Jean-Philippe Darche, McGill
- J. P. Metras Trophy – Garret Everson, Calgary
- Peter Gorman Trophy – Kojo Aidoo, McMaster
- Frank Tindall Trophy – Larry Haylor, Western

=== All-Canadian team ===
Offence
	First Team	Second Team
Quarterback	Phil Côté (Ottawa)	Benoit Chapdelaine (McMaster)
Running Back	Eric Lapointe (Mount Allison); Akbal Singh (British Columbia)	Mike Bradley (Waterloo); Gerrit Stam (Guelph)
Inside Receiver	Jermayne Baldwin (St. Francis Xavier); Chris Huismans (York)	Adrian Huntley (Manitoba); Chris Amey (Waterloo)
Outside Receiver	Rob Harrod (Ottawa); Dan Disley (Western Ontario)	Brad Coutts (British Columbia); Chris Evraire (Ottawa)
Centre	Barkley Andersen (Calgary)	Paul Sguigna (Waterloo)
Guard	Sam Stetsko (Alberta); Pascal Chéron (Laval)	Brent Weir (Acadia); Daniel Sendecki (Waterloo)
Tackle	Paul Blenkhorn (Western); André Trudel (Laval)	Scott Flory (Saskatchewan); Brad Chalmers (Saint Mary's)

Defence
	First Team	Second Team
Defensive Tackle	Cameron Legault (Carleton); James Repesse (Saskatchewan)	James Osborn (Queen's); Jason Pudwill (Mount Allison)
Defensive End	Garret Everson (Calgary); Tyson St. James (British Columbia)	Jim Aru (Queen's); Mike Maltar (Toronto)
Linebacker	Warren Muzika (Saskatchewan); Josh Tavares (Saint Mary's); Dwayne Bromfield (Concordia)	Adrian Bowers (Toronto); Daryl Tharby (Waterloo); Dan Elliott (British Columbia)
Free Safety	Chris Begley (Mount Allison)	Luke Shaver (Ottawa)
Defensive Halfback	Donnie Ruiz (Wilfrid Laurier); Jean-Vincent Posy-Audette (Laval)	Dustin Edwards (Alberta); Allan Ruby (Wilfrid Laurier)
Cornerback	Pierre Landry (Ottawa); Jason Tibbits (Waterloo)	Kevin Johnson (Wilfrid Laurier); Chris Hoople (British Columbia)

Special Teams
	First Team	Second Team
Kicker	Derek Livingstone (McMaster)	Matt Kellett (Saskatchewan)
Punter	John Baunemann (Manitoba)	Michael O’Brien (Western)

== Post-season ==
Notably this year, the Dunsmore Cup was played over two days due to an overtime game being called due to darkness. The November 14 game was played at Concordia Stadium which did not have artificial lights at the time. The Rouge et Or and the Stingers had played to a 10-10 tie after two overtime periods, which ended at 4:46pm local time when nightfall had set in. Referee Ron Morin discussed with Laval's Jacques Chapdelaine and Concordia's Pat Sheahan and agreed that the game would be played on the next day, November 15. That game was played with two 10-minute halves where the Stingers won with a Jason Casey 22-yard fumble-return touchdown which sealed the 17-12 victory.

=== Playoff bracket ===
Conference Semi-finals
Laval Rouge et Or	48
Ottawa Gee-Gees	42
Bishop's Gaiters	17
Concordia Stingers	27
Wilfrid Laurier Golden Hawks	10
Waterloo Warriors	32
McMaster Marauders	32
Western Ontario Mustangs	34

Conference Championships
Laval Rouge et Or	12
Concordia Stingers	17
Mount Allison Mounties	28
Acadia Axemen	35
UBC Thunderbirds	28
Saskatchewan Huskies	31
Waterloo Warriors	41
Western Ontario Mustangs	47

National Semi-finals
Concordia Stingers	25
Acadia Axemen	24
Western Ontario Mustangs	17
Saskatchewan Huskies	33

34th Vanier Cup
Concordia Stingers	17
Saskatchewan Huskies	24

=== Championships ===
The Vanier Cup was played between the champions of the Atlantic Bowl and the Churchill Bowl, the national semi-final games. This year, the Ontario conference's Yates Cup championship team, Western Mustangs visited the Canada West Hardy Trophy champion Saskatchewan Huskies for the Churchill Bowl. The winners of the Atlantic conference Loney Bowl championship, the Acadia Axemen, were effectively the home team for the Atlantic Bowl in Halifax, Nova Scotia which featured the Dunsmore Cup Ontario-Quebec champion Concordia Stingers. The Huskies and the Stingers both won and advanced to the 34th Vanier Cup game which was played in the SkyDome in Toronto. The Concordia Stingers made their first appearance in a Vanier Cup game, which resulted in a loss to an experienced Saskatchewan Huskies team that won their second championship in three years.
