= Concordia Stingers football =

University Canadian football team

Concordia Stingers
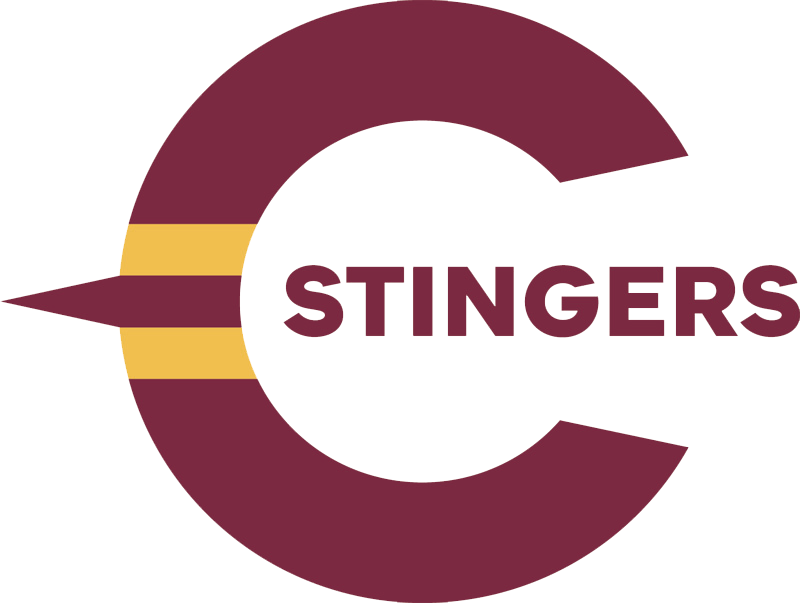
- Concordia Stingers logo
- First season: 1974; 52 years ago
- Athletic director: D'Arcy Ryan
- Head coach: Brad Collinson; 8th year, 23–41 (.359)
- Home stadium: Concordia Stadium
- Year built: 2003
- Stadium capacity: 4000
- Stadium surface: AstroPlay
- Location: Montreal, Quebec
- League: U Sports
- Conference: RSEQ (2001–present)
- Past associations: OQIFC (1974–2000)
- All-time record: –
- Postseason record: –

Titles
- Vanier Cups: 0
- Atlantic Bowls: 1; 1998
- Dunsmore Cups: 3; 1982, 1993, 1998
- Hec Crighton winners: 0
- Colours: Burgundy and Yellow
- Mascot: Buzz
- Outfitter: Nike
- Rivals: Montreal Carabins; McGill
- Website: stingers.ca/football

The Concordia Stingers football team represents Concordia University in Montreal, Quebec, in the sport of Canadian football in the RSEQ conference of U Sports. The Concordia Stingers football program was created in 1974 from the amalgamation of the Loyola Warriors and Sir George Williams Georgians. The team has won three Dunsmore Cup conference championships, in 1982, 1993, and 1998. In 1998, the Stingers also made their first and only appearance in the national championship which was a loss to the Saskatchewan Huskies in the 34th Vanier Cup game.

The team is currently coached by Brad Collinson and plays home games at Concordia Stadium.

== Recent results ==
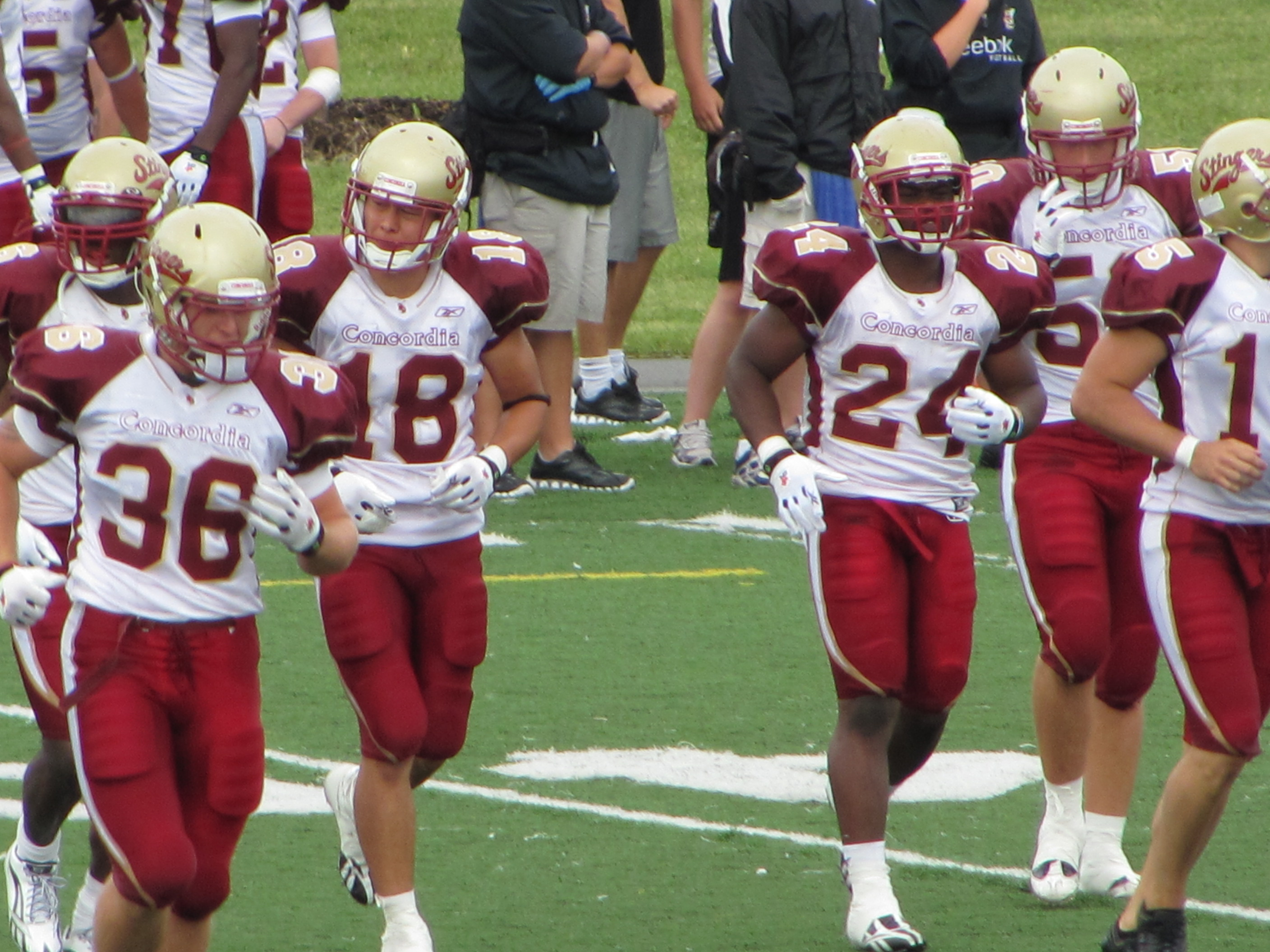
Concordia players during a game vs Guelph in 2010

Season	Pl.	W	L	OTL	PCT	PF	PA	Standing	Playoffs
1998	8	6	2	0	0.750	233	141	1st in OQIFC	Defeated Bishop's Gaiters in semifinal 27–17; Defeated Laval Rouge et Or in Dunsmore Cup 17–12; Defeated Acadia Axemen 25–24 in Atlantic Bowl; Lost to Saskatchewan Huskies in 34th Vanier Cup 24–17
1999	8	6	2	0	0.750	222	148	2nd in OQIFC	Lost to Laval Rouge et Or in semifinal 42–16
2000	8	2	6	-	0.250	153	204	5th in OQIFC	Out of Playoffs
2001^{[A]}	8	7	1	-	0.875	174	191	1st in QIFC	Lost to McGill Redmen in semifinal 11–8
2002	8	4	4	-	0.500	217	184	3rd in QIFC	Defeated Laval Rouge et Or in semifinal 29–21; Lost to McGill Redmen in Dunsmore Cup 10–6
2003	8	7	1	-	0.875	288	115	2nd in QIFC	Defeated Montreal Carabins in semifinal 35–8; Lost to Laval Rouge et Or in Dunsmore Cup 59–7
2004	8	4	4	-	0.500	157	152	3rd in QUFL	Lost to Laval Rouge et Or in semifinal 29–13
2005	8	6	2	-	0.750	235	134	3rd in QUFL	Lost to Montreal Carabins in semifinal 28–17
2006	8	6	2	-	0.750	229	131	2nd in QUFL	Defeated Montreal Carabins in semifinal 23–3; Lost to Laval Rouge et Or in Dunsmore Cup 28–12
2007	8	5	3	-	0.625	182	172	2nd in QUFL	Defeated Bishop's Gaiters in semifinal 34–18; Lost to Laval Rouge et Or in Dunsmore Cup 35–10
2008	8	5	3	-	0.625	228	180	2nd in QUFL	Defeated Sherbrooke Vert et Or in semifinal 41–20; Lost to Laval Rouge et Or in Dunsmore Cup 28–17
2009	8	3	5	-	0.375	190	61	4th in QUFL	Lost to Laval Rouge et Or in semifinal 63–1
2010	9	4	5	-	0.444	171	262	5th in QUFL	Out of Playoffs
2011	9	4	5	-	0.444	227	246	4th in RSEQ	Lost to Laval Rouge et Or in semifinal 33–7
2012^{[B]}	9	1	7	-	0.125	100	255	6th in RSEQ	Out of Playoffs
2013	8	0	8	-	0.000	176	345	6th in RSEQ	Out of Playoffs
2014	8	5	3	-	0.625	207	176	4th in RSEQ	Lost to Laval Rouge et Or in semifinal 74–18
2015	8	4	4	-	0.500	250	222	4th in RSEQ	Lost to Laval Rouge et Or in semifinal 52–8
2016	8	4	4	-	0.500	182	227	3rd in RSEQ	Lost to Laval Rouge et Or in semifinal 39–14
2017^{[C]}	7	3	4	-	0.429	181	173	3rd in RSEQ	Lost to Montreal Carabins in semifinal 42–20
2018	8	2	6	-	0.250	109	304	5th in RSEQ	Out of Playoffs
2019	8	2	6	-	0.250	121	262	4th in RSEQ	Lost to Laval Rouge et Or in semifinal 40–8
2020	Season cancelled due to COVID-19 pandemic								
2021	8	4	4	-	0.500	209	243	3rd in RSEQ	Lost to Laval Rouge et Or in semifinal 30–10
2022	8	2	6	-	0.250	185	262	4th in RSEQ	Lost to Laval Rouge et Or in semifinal 38–27
2023	8	5	3	-	0.625	200	192	3rd in RSEQ	Lost to Laval Rouge et Or in semifinal 34–27 (OT)
2024	8	2	6	-	0.250	132	225	4th in RSEQ	Lost to Laval Rouge et Or in semifinal 41–18
2025	8	3	5	-	0.375	136	243	3rd in RSEQ	Lost to Montreal Carabins in semifinal 51–2
2026	8	3	5	-	0.375	134	196	4th in RSEQ	Lost to Laval Rouge et Or in semifinal 42-4

A. Concordia originally finished in second place with a 5–3 record in 2001 and hosted a QIFC semi-final playoff game to third-place McGill, losing 11–8. However, Laval used an ineligible player throughout the entire season and vacated all regular season wins (forfeiting two wins against Concordia), giving Concordia a 7–1 record and a first place regular season finish albeit well after the 2001 season had concluded.

B. Bishop's and Concordia both used ineligible players in the same game, so the game was declared "no contest" in a double forfeit.

C. A 2017 game between the Montreal Carabins and Stingers was cancelled due to Montreal players and coaching staff members exhibiting flu symptoms. Due to scheduling constraints, the game was outright cancelled and would not be rescheduled. Montreal and Concordia would only play seven games as a result and winning percentage would be counted in the standings as opposed to point totals.

== National postseason results ==
Vanier Cup Era (1965-current)
Year	Game	Opponent	Result
1972*	Churchill Bowl	Alberta	L 6-58
1982	Churchill Bowl	Western	L 7-17
1993	Churchill Bowl	Toronto	L 16-26
1998	Atlantic Bowl Vanier Cup	Acadia Saskatchewan	W 25-24 L 17-24

Concordia is 1-3 in national semi-final games and 0-1 in the Vanier Cup.

*Includes 1972 Churchill Bowl as the Loyola Warriors.

== Head coaches ==
Name	Tenure	Notes
Doug Daigneault	1975–1977	
Skip Rochette	1978–1988	
Pat Sheahan	1989–1999	
Gerry McGrath	2000–2013	
Mickey Donovan	2014–2017	
Brad Collinson	2018–present	

== National award winners ==
- J. P. Metras Trophy: Paul Chesser (1993), Troy Cunningham (2004)
- Presidents' Trophy: Mickey Donovan (2004), Patrick Donovan (2005, 2006), Cory Greenwood (2009), Max Caron (2011)
- Peter Gorman Trophy: Liam Mahoney (2007), Jeremy Murphy (2019), Jaylan Greaves (2021)

== Stingers in the CFL ==
As of the start of the 2026 CFL season, three former Stingers players were on CFL teams' rosters:

- Loik Gagne, Hamilton Tiger-Cats
- René Paredes, Calgary Stampeders
- Dawson Pierre, Ottawa Redblacks
