= Laurent DesLauriers =

Canadian football player (born 1962)

No. 15
- Position: Safety

Personal information
- Born: January 7, 1962 (age 64); Vancouver, British Columbia, Canada
- Listed height: 6 ft 2 in (1.88 m)
- Listed weight: 200 lb (91 kg)

Career information
- High school: St. Thomas More (Burnaby, BC)
- University: UBC

Career history
- BC Lions (1984)*; Edmonton Eskimos (1984–1987); Toronto Argonauts (1988)
- * Offseason or practice squad member only

Awards and highlights
- Grey Cup champion (1987); Vanier Cup champion (1982); CFL All-Star (1984); CFL West All-Star (1984); 2× Canada West first-team All-Star (1982–1983)

Laurent DesLauriers (born January 7, 1962) is a Canadian former professional football safety who played four seasons in the Canadian Football League (CFL) with the Edmonton Eskimos and Toronto Argonauts. He played CIAU football at the University of British Columbia.

== Early life ==
Laurent DesLauriers was born on January 7, 1962, in Vancouver, British Columbia. He played high school football and basketball at St. Thomas More Collegiate in Burnaby.

== University career ==
DesLauriers played CIAU football for the UBC Thunderbirds of the University of British Columbia. He was a two-year starter at defensive halfback from 1980 to 1981. DesLauriers was then a starter at receiver in 1982 and earned Canada West first-team All-Star honors. He also set four kick/punt return records during the 1982 season: single-season record 719 punt return yards, single-game record 170 punt return yards, single-game record 215 kickoff return yards, and longest kickoff return with 107 yards. On November 20, 1982, the Thunderbirds won the 18th Vanier Cup against the Western Mustangs by a score of 39–14. DesLauriers returned to defence in 1983, and was the team's starting cornerback. He garnered Canada West first-team All-Star recognition for the second straight season and was also named a CIAU All-Canadian. He set school career records with 1,538 punt return yards and 1,143 kickoff return yards. DesLauriers majored in physical education at UBC, and graduated in 1984.

== Professional career ==
DesLauriers was the territorial choice of the BC Lions in the 1984 CFL draft. On May 1, 1984, it was reported that he had signed with the Lions. Later in May, DesLauriers and Frank Balkovec were traded to the Edmonton Eskimos for Jim Parker. DesLauriers dressed in all 16 games for the Eskimos during the 1984 season and intercepted nine passes for 110 yards, earning CFL All-Star and CFL West All-Star honors. He was the Eskimos' nominee for the CFL's Most Outstanding Canadian Award. Edmonton finished 9–7 and lost in the Western semifinal to the Winnipeg Blue Bombers by a score of 55–20. DesLauriers dressed in all 16 games for the second straight season in 1985, interception nine passes for 183 yards, as the Eskimos finished 10–6 and lost in the Western semifinals to the Blue Bombers again. He dressed in nine games in 1986, and intercepted four passes before suffering a season-ending knee injury on September 26 while attempting to tackle Keyvan Jenkins. In his absence, the Eskimos lost the 74th Grey Cup on November 30, 1986. He also missed the entire 1987 season due to the injury. However, this time Edmonton won the 75th Grey Cup in his absence. DesLauriers was let go by the Eskimos in June 1988 after failing a physical.

DesLauriers then signed with the Toronto Argonauts for the 1988 season. He dressed in 17 games for Toronto in 1988 and skipped practices. He separated his shoulder on October 30 in the next-to-last game of the regular season. DesLauriers returned in the Eastern final on November 20, wearing a protective harness, but the Argonauts lost. In June 1989, it was reported that DesLauriers had retired. His wife stated "The risks were a bit too high for him that he might get reinjured. If it was just his knee, he might have gone back but he's not ready to go through for his shoulder what he did with his knee." He finished his CFL career with totals of 58 games dressed, 27 interceptions for 462 yards, eight punt returns for 60 yards, and one sack.

== Post-playing career ==
After his CFL career, DesLauriers became a high school teacher and coach at his alma mater St. Thomas More. He returned to UBC as an assistant football coach in 1992. He was the team's defensive coordinator from 1995 to 1996. DesLauriers was the head football coach at UBC from 2002 to 2005. He was inducted into the UBC Sports Hall of Fame in 2002 and the British Columbia Football Hall of Fame in 2014. He has also been a coach for the Simon Fraser Clan and a teacher/coach at Lord Tweedsmuir Secondary. His son, J.J. DesLauriers, played football at Simon Fraser.
