= Mike Emery =

Canadian football player (born 1961)

No. 35, 75, 85
- Position: Linebacker

Personal information
- Born: 29 March 1961 (age 65); Steveston, British Columbia, Canada
- Listed height: 6 ft 0 in (1.83 m)
- Listed weight: 220 lb (100 kg)

Career information
- High school: Steveston (Richmond, British Columbia)
- University: UBC
- CFL draft: 1983: 1st round, 3rd overall pick

Career history
- Saskatchewan Roughriders (1983); Toronto Argonauts (1984–1985); Montreal Alouettes (1985); Calgary Stampeders (1986–1987)

Awards and highlights
- Vanier Cup champion (1982); 2× Presidents' Trophy (1981–1982)

Mike Emery (born March 29, 1961) is a Canadian former professional football linebacker who played five seasons in the Canadian Football League (CFL) with the Saskatchewan Roughriders, Toronto Argonauts, Montreal Alouettes, and Calgary Stampeders. He played CIAU football at the University of British Columbia.

== Early life ==
Mike Emery was born on March 29, 1961, in Steveston, British Columbia. He played high school football at Steveston High School in Richmond, British Columbia, as a linebacker.

Emery played CIAU football for the UBC Thunderbirds of the University of British Columbia from 1980 to 1982. He was a three-time defensive co-team captain and a three-year starter. He was a two-time Canada West all-star and two-time All-Canadian from 1981 to 1982. In 1982, he led the Thunderbirds to an undefeated record and a victory in the 18th Vanier Cup, the first in school history. Emery was the co-defensive MVP of the Vanier Cup. He was also a two-time Presidents' Trophy winner from 1981 to 1982 as the best defensive player in Canadian university football.

== Professional career ==
Emery was selected by the Saskatchewan Roughriders in the first round, with the third overall pick, of the 1983 CFL draft. He dressed in all 16 games for the Roughriders during his rookie year in 1983 and returned one kickoff for 15 yards. He became a starter at outside linebacker late in the year. The Roughriders finished the year with a 5–11 record. Emery was moved to middle linebacker after the 1983 season.

On June 14, 1984, Emery was traded to the Toronto Argonauts for Ken McEachern. Emery was reportedly surprised at the trade, stating "I guess I wasn't doing what they wanted me to do." Emery dressed in 16 games for Toronto in 1984 and recorded one interception. The Argonauts finished the 1984 season 9–6–1 and lost in the Eastern final to the Hamilton Tiger-Cats. Emery dressed in eight games in 1985.

On September 26, 1985, Emery was traded to the Montreal Concordes for Preston Young. Emery dressed in five games for the Concordes during the 1985 season and recovered two fumbles. He was cut by Montreal on June 21, 1986.

On September 16, 1986, it was reported that Emery had been signed to the practice roster of the Calgary Stampeders. He was promoted to the active roster and dressed in seven games for the Stampeders in 1986, totaling one sack and one fumble recovery touchdown. He dressed in seven games in 1987. Emery also spent part of the 1987 season on the practice roster.

== Post-playing career ==
Emery is currently the linebackers coach at South Delta Secondary School. He was inducted into the B.C. Football Hall of Fame in 2025.
