= Pieter Vanden Bos =

Canadian football player (born 1961)

No. 66, 51, 55, 50, 77
- Position: Offensive lineman

Personal information
- Born: November 5, 1961 (age 65); Toronto, Ontario, Canada
- Listed height: 6 ft 1 in (1.85 m)
- Listed weight: 250 lb (113 kg)

Career information
- University: UBC
- CFL draft: 1983: 1st round, 4th overall pick

Career history
- 1983: Edmonton Eskimos
- 1983–1984: Winnipeg Blue Bombers
- 1984: Saskatchewan Roughriders
- 1984–1986: Ottawa Rough Riders
- 1987–1989: BC Lions

Awards and highlights
- Grey Cup champion (1984); Vanier Cup champion (1982); All-Canadian (1982); 2× Canada West All-Star (1981,1982)

Pieter Vanden Bos (born November 5, 1961) is a Canadian former professional football offensive lineman who played seven seasons in the Canadian Football League (CFL) with the Winnipeg Blue Bombers, Ottawa Rough Riders and BC Lions. He was selected by the Edmonton Eskimos with the fourth overall pick of the 1983 CFL draft. He played CIS football at the University of British Columbia.

== Early life ==
Pieter Vanden Bos was born on November 5, 1961, in Toronto, Ontario. He played CIS football for the UBC Thunderbirds of the University of British Columbia, with his final year being in 1982. He was named a Canada West All-Star in 1981 and 1982 and an All-Canadian in 1982. Vanden Bos helped the Thunderbirds win the 18th Vanier Cup in 1982.

== Professional career ==
Vanden Bos was selected by the Edmonton Eskimos in the first round, with the fourth overall pick, of the 1983 CFL draft. He began the 1983 season on injured reserve and did not play in any games for the Eskimos during the 1983 season.

On September 12, 1983, Vanden Bos and Ken Walter were traded to the Winnipeg Blue Bombers for Milson Jones. He played in six games for the Blue Bombers in 1983 and seven games in 1984.

On September 12, 1984, it was reported that Vanden Bos had been traded to the Saskatchewan Roughriders to complete an earlier trade the Blue Bombers had made for Brent Rachette. Vanden Bos did not appear in any games for the Roughriders before being traded to the Ottawa Rough Riders in October 1984 for Gary Dulin. Vanden Bos played in three games for the Rough Riders in 1984, seven games in 1985, and 13 games in 1986.

In February 1987, Vanden Bos requested a trade to the BC Lions, stating that it was the only place he would play. He worked in British Columbia for the family lumber business during the CFL offseasons. He was later suspended by the Rough Riders for not reporting to training camp. On June 15, 1987, he was traded to the Lions for a third-round pick in the 1988 CFL draft. Vanden Bos played in 17 games for the Lions in 1987, 12 games in 1988, and seven games in 1989. On June 12, 1990, Vanden Bos, who was managing a cell phone store in the offseason at the time, filed his retirement papers with the CFL. He said he "made a moral decision" to retire because he told the phone store he would not be returning to the CFL and that he did not want to "go back on [his] word". However, he stated that he still wanted to play in the CFL.
