= Tim Jenkins =

American football player and coach (born 1991)

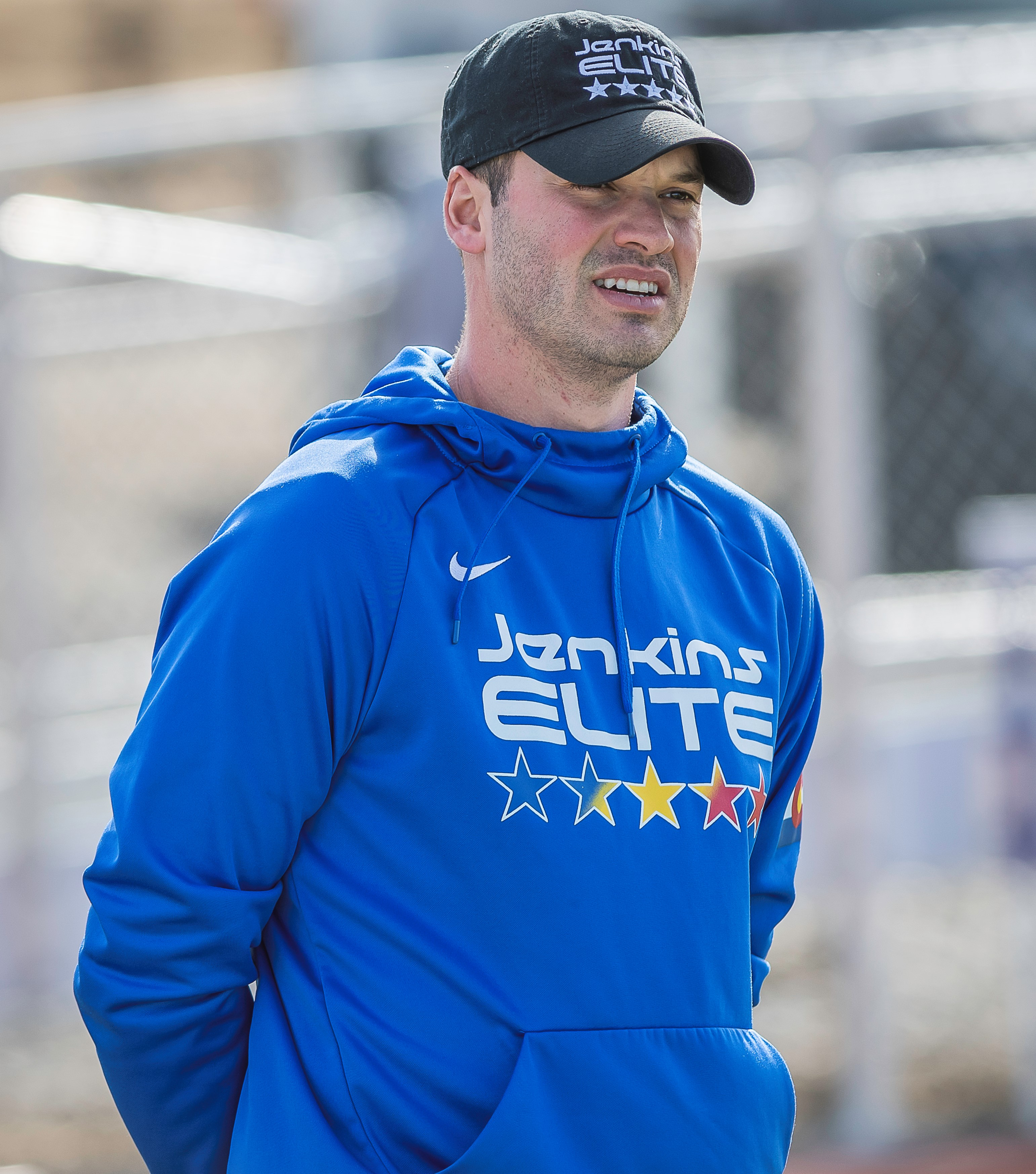
Tim Jenkins, Private Quarterback Coach

Timothy Jenkins (born February 6, 1991) is an American football coach. Based in Parker, Colorado, Jenkins has tutored Phillip "PJ" Walker, Luis Perez, Michael O'Connor, and Isaac Harker, among others.

== High school career ==
Jenkins is a 2009 graduate of ThunderRidge High School in Highlands Ranch, where he played on the football team from 2005 to 2009. Jenkins was named first team All-Southern league during his senior season.

== College career ==
Jenkins was a four-year starter at Quarterback for Fort Lewis College. Jenkins ranks among Fort Lewis College's career leaders in completions (2nd all time), passing yards (3rd all time), and passing touchdowns (4th all time). Jenkins was named RMAC offensive player the week on two occasions, for the week of September 20, 2010 and October 17, 2011. He was chosen as the National Football Foundation & College Football Hall of Fame - Colorado Chapter player of the week for the week of October 1, 2012. Jenkins was also named the 2009 RMAC Offensive Freshman of the year. Fort Lewis went 8-34 in Jenkins’ four years with the program.

== Professional career ==
Jenkins was rated the 58th best Quarterback in the 2013 NFL draft by NFLDraftScout.com.

=== St. Louis Rams ===
On May 13, 2013, Jenkins was signed by the St. Louis Rams as an undrafted free agent. He was waived by the Rams on August 27, 2013.

=== Calgary Stampeders ===
On October 22, 2013, Jenkins was signed to the Calgary Stampeders practice squad. He was waived by the Stampeders on October 31, 2013.

== Jenkins Elite ==
In 2013, he established Jenkins Elite, a sports firm specializing in Quarterback, Wide Receiver, Running Back, and Lineman skill training based out of Parker, Colorado. Jenkins Elite launched a Sugar Land, Texas location in November 2020, and has announced that it will be opening a Scottsdale, Arizona location in March 2021.

=== Notable trainees ===
Jenkins has developed quarterbacks including Harlon Hill-winner Luis Perez. Other pro-clients include Phillip Walker, Isaac Harker, Alex Snyder, Grant Kraemer, Michael O'Connor (Canadian football), and Austin Apodaca. Jenkins also currently works with the following notable college Quarterbacks, Ty Evans NC State and Elite 11 Quarterback, Alex Padilla Iowa, Fred Payton Jr. Coastal Carolina University, Hollis Mathis College of William & Mary, Joe Mancuso University of Richmond, Kory Curtis Bryant University, and Tyler Vander Waal Wyoming.
