= Junior Robinson =

Junior Robinson may refer to:

- Junior Robinson (defensive back, born 1961) (born 1961), Jamaican-Canadian football player
- Junior Robinson (defensive back, born 1968) (1968–1995), American and Canadian football player
- Junior Robinson (basketball) (born 1996), American basketball player
- Junior Robinson (footballer) (born 2004), English association football player
