= Ryan Baker =

Ryan Baker may refer to:

- Ryan Baker (American football) (born 1984), American former football player
- Ryan Baker (Canadian football) (born 2000), CFL linebacker
- Ryan S. Baker (born 1977), education researcher and professor
- Ryan Baker (Home and Away), soap opera character
- Ryan Baker, drummer in the American band Kane
- Ryan Baker, news anchor for WBBM-TV
