= Balkovec =

Balkovec is a surname. Notable people with the surname include:

- Frank Balkovec (born 1959), Canadian football player
- Jure Balkovec (born 1994), Slovenian footballer
- Rachel Balkovec (born 1987), American baseball coach
