= Daigneault =

Daigneault is a surname. Notable people with the surname include:

- Barbara Daigneault, victim of the École Polytechnique massacre in 1989 in Montreal, Quebec, Canada
- Doug Daigneault (born 1937), Canadian Football League player
- Frédéric-Hector Daigneault (1860–1933), Canadian provincial politician
- J. J. Daigneault (born 1965), retired Canadian professional ice hockey defenceman
- Julie Daigneault (born 1965), former international freestyle swimmer from Canada
- Mark Daigneault (born 1985), American basketball coach

== See also ==
- Dagneux
- Daignet
- Diagnal
