= 1999 CIAU football season =

- Duration: September 10, 1999 – November 6, 1999
- Hardy Cup champions: Saskatchewan Huskies
- Yates Cup champions: Waterloo Warriors
- Dunsmore Cup champions: Laval Rouge et Or
- Loney Bowl champions: Saint Mary's Huskies
- Atlantic Bowl champions: Saint Mary's Huskies
- Churchill Bowl champions: Laval Rouge et Or

Vanier Cup
- Date: November 27, 1999
- Venue: SkyDome, Toronto
- Champions: Laval Rouge et Or

CIAU football seasons seasons
- 1998 2000

The 1999 CIAU football season began on September 10, 1999, and concluded with the 35th Vanier Cup national championship on November 27, 1999, at the SkyDome in Toronto, Ontario, with the Laval Rouge et Or winning the first Vanier Cup in program history. Twenty-four universities across Canada competed in CIAU football this season, the highest level of amateur play in Canadian football, under the auspices of the Canadian Interuniversity Athletics Union (CIAU). The Regina Rams began their first season of play in the CIAU after previously playing in the Canadian Junior Football League.

== Regular season ==
=== Standings ===
Note: GP = Games Played, W = Wins, L = Losses, T = Ties, PF = Points For, PA = Points Against, Pts = Points

Atlantic
Team	GP	W	L	PF	PA	Pts
**Saint Mary's**	8	7	1	276	131	14
**Acadia**	8	5	3	198	195	10
Mount Allison	8	4	4	126	136	8
StFX	8	1	7	132	270	2

Ontario-Quebec
Team	GP	W	L	PF	PA	Pts
**Ottawa**	8	8	0	282	193	16
**Concordia**	8	6	2	222	148	12
**Laval**	8	6	2	237	123	12
**McGill**	8	3	5	155	225	6
Queen's	8	2	6	179	189	4
Bishop's	8	2	6	129	193	4

Ontario
Team	GP	W	L	T	PF	PA	Pts
**Western**	8	7	1	0	232	91	14
**Laurier**	8	6	2	0	273	138	12
**McMaster**	8	6	2	0	238	226	12
**Waterloo**	8	4	4	0	232	149	8
Guelph	8	3	5	0	168	196	6
York	8	2	6	0	175	163	4
Toronto	8	1	7	0	91	337	2
Windsor	8	0	8	0	94	345	0

Canada West
Team	GP	W	L	T	PF	PA	Pts
**UBC**	8	7	1	0	227	131	14
**Saskatchewan**	8	6	2	0	233	151	12
**Manitoba**	8	5	3	0	218	202	10
**Calgary**	8	3	5	0	191	225	6
Alberta	8	3	5	0	232	217	6
Regina	8	0	8	0	121	309	0

Teams in bold earned playoff berths.

== Post-season awards ==
=== Award-winners ===
- Hec Crighton Trophy – Phil Côté, Ottawa
- Presidents' Trophy – Mike Letendre, Saskatchewan
- Russ Jackson Award – Carlo Panaro, Alberta
- J. P. Metras Trophy – Tyson St. James, British Columbia
- Peter Gorman Trophy – Sébastien Roy, Mt. Allison

=== All-Canadian team ===
Offence
	First Team	Second Team
Quarterback	Phil Côté (Ottawa)	Blaine Scatcherd (Acadia)
Running Back	Mike Bradley (Waterloo); Akbal Singh (UBC)	Doug Rozon (Saskatchewan); Jeff Johnson (York)
Inside Receiver	James MacLean (Queen’s); Ibrahim Tounkara (Ottawa)	Brian Nugent (York); Jason Clermont (Regina)
Outside Receiver	Jamie Stoddard (Alberta); Andre Talbot (Wilfrid Laurier)	Marco Picotte (Acadia); Brad Coutts (UBC)
Centre	Carlo Panaro (Alberta)	Jacques Cloutier (Laval)
Guard	Aaron Barker (UBC); Pascal Chéron (Laval)	Michael Chuk (Western); John Salmas (Saint Mary’s)
Tackle	Kevin Lefsrud (Saskatchewan); André Trudel (Laval)	Paul Blenkhorn (Western); Eric Sanderson (York)

Defence
	First Team	Second Team
Defensive Tackle	Daaron McField (UBC); Jeremy Oxley (Guelph)	Ryan Henderson (Manitoba); Randy Chevrier (McGill)
Defensive End	Kojo Millington (Wilfrid Laurier); Tyson St. James (UBC)	Mathieu Gauthier (Mount Allison); Josh Thomas (Acadia)
Linebacker	Mike Letendre (Saskatchewan); Josh Tavares (Saint Mary’s); Dino DiMarino (Wilfrid Laurier)	Justin Anania (Western); Joey Mikawoz (Manitoba); Jason Casey (Concordia)
Free Safety	Derek Fink (Alberta)	Patrick Boies (Laval)
Defensive Halfback	Donnie Ruiz (Wilfrid Laurier); Jean-Vincent Posy-Audette (Laval)	Jeff Lewis (Calgary); Sean Spender (Guelph)
Cornerback	Jason Wimmer (Queen’s); Jason Hutchins (Alberta)	Jermaine Romans (Acadia); Mike Eberts (Alberta)

Special Teams
	First Team	Second Team
Kicker	Derek Livingstone (McMaster)	David Bradford (Mount Allison)
Punter	Michael O’Brien (Western)	Jamie Boreham (Saskatchewan)

== Post-season ==
=== Playoff bracket ===
Conference Semi-finals
Waterloo Warriors	35
Western Ontario Mustangs	21
McMaster Marauders	27
Wilfrid Laurier Golden Hawks	42
Manitoba Bisons	16
Saskatchewan Huskies	42
Calgary Dinos	14
UBC Thunderbirds	27
Laval Rouge et Or	42
Concordia Stingers	16
McGill Redmen	21
Ottawa Gee-Gees	24

Conference Championships
Waterloo Warriors	32
Wilfrid Laurier Golden Hawks	20
Acadia Axemen	24
Saint Mary's Huskies	25
Saskatchewan Huskies	31
UBC Thunderbirds	24
Laval Rouge et Or	38
Ottawa Gee-Gees	6

National Semi-finals
Waterloo Warriors	14
Saint Mary's Huskies	21
Saskatchewan Huskies	21
Laval Rouge et Or	27

35th Vanier Cup
Saint Mary's Huskies	10
Laval Rouge et Or	14

=== Championships ===
The Vanier Cup was played between the champions of the Atlantic Bowl and the Churchill Bowl, the national semi-final games. This year, the Dunsmore Cup Ontario-Quebec champion Laval Rouge et Or hosted the Canada West Hardy Trophy champion Saskatchewan Huskies for the Churchill Bowl. The winners of the Atlantic conference Loney Bowl championship, the Saint Mary's Huskies, hosted the Ontario conference's Yates Cup championship team, Waterloo Warriors, for the Atlantic Bowl. The Saint Mary's Huskies appeared in their fifth Vanier Cup game while the Laval Rouge et Or, whose program began in 1996, made their first appearance in the championship game. The 35th Vanier Cup was played in Toronto's SkyDome where the Rouge et Or defeated the Huskies 14–10 to claim the team's first Vanier Cup championship.
