= Stavros Katsantonis =

Canadian gridiron football player (born 1996)

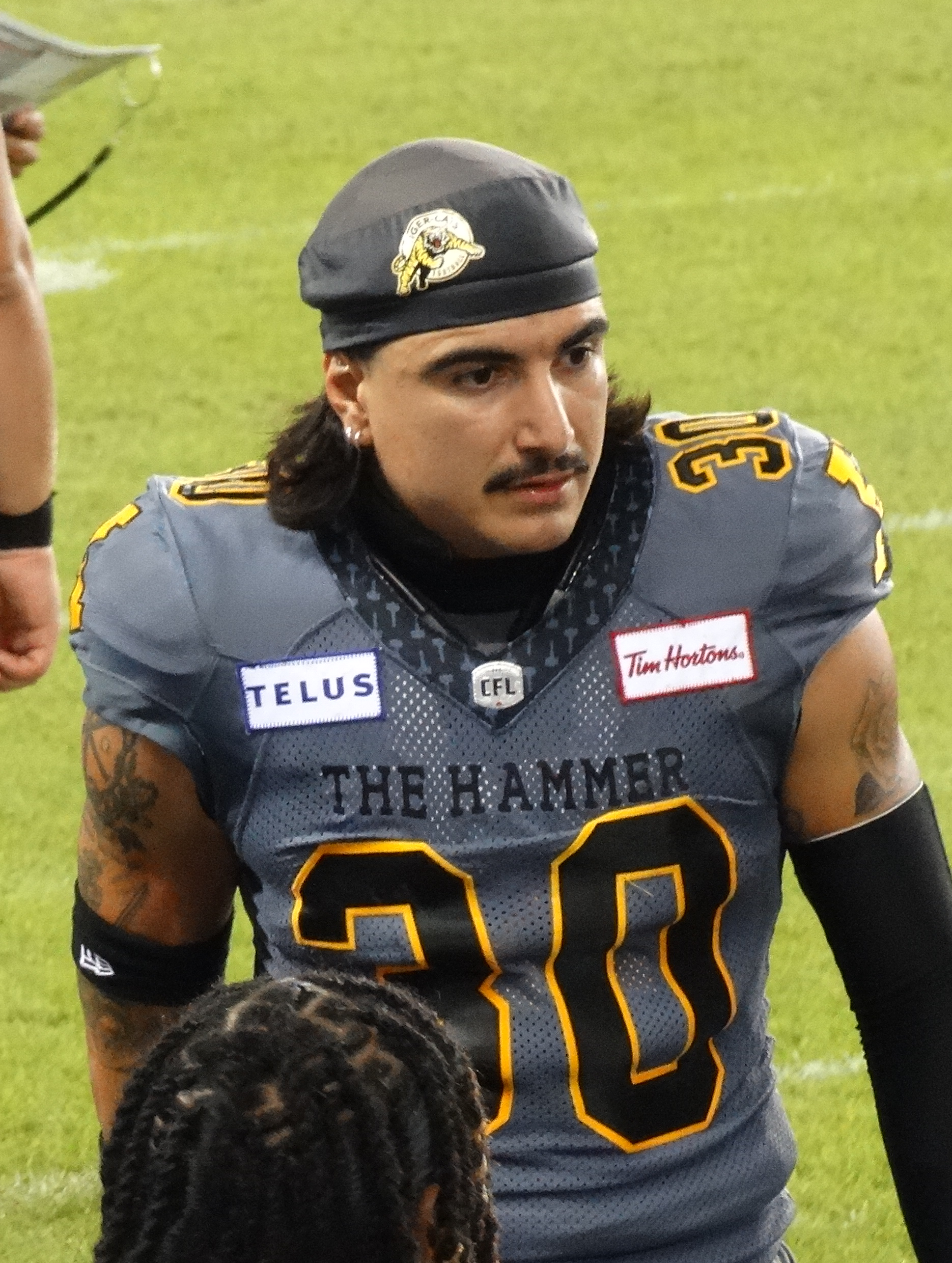
- Katsantonis with the Hamilton Tiger-Cats in 2024

No. 30 – Hamilton Tiger-Cats
- Position: Defensive back
- Roster status: Active
- CFL status: National

Personal information
- Born: September 9, 1996 (age 30); Bakersfield, California, U.S.
- Listed height: 5 ft 8 in (1.73 m)
- Listed weight: 188 lb (85 kg)

Career information
- High school: Liberty High School (Bakersfield, California)
- University: British Columbia
- CFL draft: 2020: 4th round, 36th overall pick

Career history
- 2021–present: Hamilton Tiger-Cats

Awards and highlights
- CFL All-Star (2025); CFL East All-Star (2025); Vanier Cup champion (2015); Bruce Coulter Award (2015); 3× First-team All-Canadian (2016, 2017, 2018)
- Stats at CFL.ca

Stavros Anastasios Katsantonis (Greek: Σταύρος Αναστάσιος Κατσαντώνης, born September 9, 1996), nicknamed "the Bakersfield Bandit", is a Canadian-American professional football defensive back for the Hamilton Tiger-Cats of the Canadian Football League (CFL). He played U Sports football for the UBC Thunderbirds. In college he developed a reputation for forcing turnovers, setting school records, as well as cracking the conference and national record books earning 20 career interceptions as well as a total of 10 forced/recovered fumbles. In his first university season, he garnered national attention with six interceptions and a total of four forced and recovered fumbles in seven games. In his true freshman season, he would go on to be proven as an integral part of the 2015 Vanier Cup champion T-Birds, and received the Bruce Coulter Award as the Vanier Cup's Defensive MVP. Katsantonis would go on to be a 3× first team All-Canadian at the safety position during his collegiate tenure.

== Early life ==
A native of Bakersfield, California, Katsantonis attended Liberty High School as well as Garces Memorial High School. His freshman and sophomore seasons were spent playing for the Garces Rams. A family hardship initiated the transfer to Liberty where Katsantonis would finish his high school career for his junior and senior seasons. He would go on to accumulate 145 tackles, 9 interceptions, and a total of 3 forced/recovered fumbles in his final two seasons of high school, earning him all area honors at the safety position.

While living in Bakersfield, California, Katsantonis was raised by his parents Jimmy and Becky Katsantonis. His father being an immigrant from Canada, Katsantonis would receive Canadian citizenship which would later work in his favor for his football endeavors. Katsantonis took after his father who also played collegiate football and won a Vanier Cup with the University of Calgary in 1988.

Katsantonis was also a multi-sport athlete participating in football, basketball, soccer, track and field, and hockey during his youth and throughout high school.

Katsantonis was high school teammates with Green Bay Packers and first round selection in the 2020 NFL draft, quarterback Jordan Love as well as signed Packers UDFA Krys Barnes.

== University career ==
Unranked coming out of high school and with no prominent D-1 or D-1AA offers Katsantonis' father advised his son to look to Canada. Coach Blake Nill at The University of British Columbia offered Katsantonis a scholarship in early 2015. Katsantonis accepted and played for Coach Nill's UBC T-Birds football team from 2015 to 2018.

=== 2015 season ===
As a true freshman in 2015, Katsantonis played in all 12 games with 7 starts coming towards the end of the season. He finished the season with 41 tackles, 6 interceptions, and 4 forced/recovered fumbles earning him the nickname “The Bakersfield Bandit." He was named the Bruce Coulter award winner in the 2015 Vanier Cup after he recorded 6.5 tackles a pass break up, and a key forced and recovered fumble late in the game. Katsantonis would go on to become a Vanier Cup champion in that game thanks to a game winning field goal with no time on the clock by future Saskatchewan Roughriders 2016 CFL draft pick Quinn Van Gylswyk.

=== 2016 season ===
At the end of the 2016 season, Katsantonis had 67 total tackles (45 solo and 22 assists), 5 interceptions, 3 fumble recoveries, 1 sack, and 5 pass break ups. He would go on to be named a Unanimous First-team All-Conference at the safety position as well as garner national attention earning First-team All-Canadian honors.

Katsantonis was also invited to participate in the 2016 International Bowl to represent Team Canada at AT&T Stadium in Arlington, Texas. Katsantonis would again prove his worth in the game picking off future Redskins Quarterback Dwayne Haskins. He was named the MVP of this game along with Haskins.

=== 2017 season ===
Throughout the 2017 season Katsantonis had established himself as one of the premier defensive players in Usports football. At the end of the 2017 season Katsantonis had accumulated another 5-interception season, 47 tackles, and 3 forced fumbles. This led to Katsantonis becoming a finalist for the Presidents trophy, which is given each year to the nations top defense player. He was also awarded the Canada West Conference Most Outstanding Defensive player. Katsantonis would again go on to be named a Unanimous First team All-Conference and First-team All-Canadian at the safety position.

Katsantonis would also be invited to the Canada's annual East-West All-Star game for prospects entering their draft year.

=== 2018 season ===
By the end of the 2018 season Katsantonis had put up another multiple turnover year with 4 interceptions (1 returned for a 67-yard TD), 1 fumble recovery, and 50 total tackles. Katsantonis would land another consecutive year of First-team All-Conference and First-team All-Canadian honors at the safety position solidifying himself as one of the top defensive backs to play the Canadian university game.

=== Statistics ===
Year	Team	GP	Tackles				Fumbles		Pass defense	
Year	Team	GP	Solo	Ast	Total	Loss-yards	Rcv-yards-TD	FF	Int-yards	PBU
2015	UBC	12	26	15	41	0	2-61-1	2	6-41	7
2016	UBC	10	45	22	67	1-6	3-25-0	0	5-44	5
2017	UBC	10	24	44	47	0.5-1	0	3	5-58	2
2018	UBC	9	28	22	50	1.5-4	1-0-0	0	4-69	2

== Professional career ==
In late January 2019, Katsantonis announced his entrance into both the CFL and NFL drafts.

Pre-draft measurables
Height	Weight	Arm length	Hand span	Wingspan	40-yard dash	10-yard split	20-yard split	20-yard shuttle	Three-cone drill	Vertical jump	Broad jump	Bench press
5 ft 9 1/4 in (1.76 m)	188 lb (85 kg)	30 in (0.76 m)	9 3/8 in (0.24 m)	6 ft 1 1/2 in (1.87 m)	4.64 s	1.57 s	2.64 s	4.18 s	6.56 s	38.0 in (0.97 m)	9 ft 10 7/8 in (3.02 m)	13 reps
All values from CFL Combine/UBC's Pro Day

Katsantonis attended the 2019 CFL National Combine in late March 2019 and completed all the combine and positional drills. On April 4, 2019, Katsantonis attended UBC's pro day to build upon his combine numbers and draft interests on both sides of the border. He was projected to be a 3rd to 4th round pick by the majority of CFL draft experts and scouts.

On April 25, 2019, it was announced that Katsantonis had a doping violation slated against him due to a positive drug test from the CFL Combine. The substance was announced as SARMs LGD-4033 a synthetic supplement that enhances muscle growth. Katsantonis claimed that the positive test was due to a contaminated substance and that it was unintentional. He later commented to various new outlets that he did not do his due diligence in researching the ingredient labels on the supplements he was taking. He also stated that he took responsibility and has learned from the situation. This in turn caused Katsantonis to be deferred to the 2020 CFL draft class and serve as a one-year suspension from the professional ranks.

Katsantonis still continued to stay around football earning himself an invite to an XFL tryout in Los Angeles during the summer of 2019. From there Katsantonis had moved back to his hometown of Bakersfield, California, where he volunteered his time coaching at a local high school Bakersfield Christian head coached by Darren Carr (brother of former number 1 overall pick David Carr and Las Vegas Raiders Quarterback Derek Carr. Katsantonis would serve as a defensive assistant and spot games from the booth which would help lead to a California Division 3 State title for the Bakersfield Christian Eagles.

Katsantonis would again garner more attention on national level when he received an invite to participate in the 2020 College Gridiron Showcase in Fort Worth, Texas. This gave Katsantonis the opportunity to perform and prove to NFL and CFL scouts that the year off football hadn't regressed his game.

Leading up to the 2020 CFL draft, Katsantonis had received an invite to a CFL regional combine, but due to the COVID-19 pandemic all the combines were canceled by the CFL. He was still considered to be a top prospect prior the 2020 CFL Draft and was considered a 3rd-4th round pick.

The Hamilton Tiger-Cats selected Katsantonis in the 4th round (36th overall) of the 2020 CFL draft. Katsantonis was the 5th defensive back drafted in 2020. He did not play in 2020 due to the cancellation of the 2020 CFL season and was signed by the Tiger-Cats on January 21, 2021.
