= George Voelk =

Canadian football player (born 1962)

Profile
- Position: Defensive lineman

Personal information
- Born: September 28, 1962 (age 64); Tisdale, Saskatchewan, Canada
- Listed height: 6 ft 3 in (1.91 m)
- Listed weight: 225 lb (102 kg)

Career information
- College: Saskatchewan

Career history
- 1985: Montreal Concordes

George Voelk (born September 28, 1962) is a Canadian former professional football player who played with the Montreal Concordes as a defensive lineman. Voelk was drafted in the sixth round of the 1984 CFL draft by the Concordes. Voelke attended the Montreal training camp in 1984, but did not make the team until his second attempt in 1985. Voelk dressed for all 16 games in 1985.
