= Dave Sparenberg =

Canadian gridiron football player (born 1959)

Profile
- Position: Guard

Personal information
- Born: May 28, 1959 (age 67); Talbotville, Ontario, Canada
- Listed height: 6 ft 3 in (1.91 m)
- Listed weight: 257 lb (117 kg)

Career information
- University: Western Ontario
- CFL draft: 1984: 4th round, 35th overall pick

Career history
- Edmonton Eskimos (1985–1986); Cleveland Browns (1987)

Career CFL statistics
- Games: 1
- Stats at Pro Football Reference

David Sparenberg (born May 28, 1959, in Talbotville, Ontario, Canada) is a former professional gridiron football guard. He played his university football at the University of Western Ontario and was drafted in the fourth round of the 1984 CFL draft by the Saskatchewan Roughriders. He played two seasons in the Canadian Football League for the Edmonton Eskimos. In 1987, he was signed by the Cleveland Browns as a replacement player during the 1987 NFL strike. He played in one game for the Browns before he sustained an injury where he was placed on injured reserve for the remainder of the season.
