= 22nd Vanier Cup =

1986 Canadian university football championship

UBC Thunderbirds	Western Mustangs
(8–0)	(6–0–1)
25	23
Head coach: Frank Smith	Head coach: Larry Haylor
	1	2	3	4	Total
UBC Thunderbirds	0	0	0	25	25
Western Mustangs	0	0	0	23	23
- Date: November 22, 1986
- Stadium: Varsity Stadium
- Location: Toronto
- Ted Morris Memorial Trophy: Eric Putoto, UBC
- Attendance: 17,847

The 22nd Vanier Cup was played on November 22, 1986, at Varsity Stadium in Toronto, Ontario, and decided the CIAU football champion for the 1986 season. The UBC Thunderbirds won their second championship by defeating the Western Mustangs by a score of 25-23.
