= 1984 CFL draft =

Canadian football draft

The 1984 CFL draft composed of eight rounds where over 71 Canadian football players were chosen from eligible Canadian universities and Canadian players playing in the NCAA. A total of nine players were selected as territorial exemptions, with every team but Montreal making at least one selection during this stage of the draft.

== Territorial exemptions ==
British Columbia Lions Laurent DesLauriers LB British Columbia

Calgary Stampeders Mike Palumbo OL Washington State

Edmonton Eskimos Gord Bolstad WR Alberta

Hamilton Tiger-Cats Ralph Scholz DT Cornell

Ottawa Rough Riders Michel Bourgeau DT Boise State

Ottawa Rough Riders (via Montreal) Jim De Silva OL Carleton

Saskatchewan Roughriders Mike Anderson OL San Diego State

Toronto Argonauts Sterling Hinds RB Washington

Winnipeg Blue Bombers Mike Ethier WR South Dakota State

== 1st round ==
1. British Columbia Lions Frank Balkovec LB Toronto

2. Montreal Concordes Ian Sinclair C Miami (Fla.)

3. Winnipeg Blue Bombers Trevor Williams DB York

4. Ottawa Rough Riders Maurice Martin DB Toronto

5. Calgary Stampeders Sean McKeown DL Western Ontario

6. Edmonton Eskimos Mike Robinson LB Utah State

7. Edmonton Eskimos Chris Skinner TB Bishop's

8. Edmonton Eskimos John Mandarich OT Kent State

9. Saskatchewan Roughriders Robert Reid TB Simon Fraser

== 2nd round ==
= CFL Division All-Star	= CFL All-Star	= Hall of Famer

Pick #	CFL team	Player	Position	School
10	BC Lions	Roy Kurtz	K	Wilfird Laurier
11	Montreal Concordes	Trevor Bowles	OT	San Jose State
12	Winnipeg Blue Bombers	Richard Nemeth	WR	Western Ontario
13	Edmonton Eskimos	Kurt Chapman	OL	Simon Fraser
14	Edmonton Eskimos	David Shadrach	DB	Simon Fraser
15	Saskatchewan Roughriders	Glen Suitor	DB	Simon Fraser
16	Hamilton Tiger-Cats	Tony Marrone	C	Concordia
17	Toronto Argonauts	Dave Lovegrove	DB	Wilfrid Laurier

== 3rd round ==
= CFL Division All-Star	= CFL All-Star	= Hall of Famer

Pick #	CFL team	Player	Position	School
18	BC Lions	Murray McKay	C	Alberta
19	Montreal Concordes	Paul Tiffin	DL	Simon Fraser
20	Winnipeg Blue Bombers	David Black	OL	Wilfrid Laurier
21	Ottawa Rough Riders	Damir Dupin	DL	Nevada-Las Vegas
22	Calgary Stampeders	Nord Williams	RB	York
23	Edmonton Eskimos	John Godry	RB	Guelph
24	Saskatchewan Roughriders	Todd Stansbury	LB	Georgia Institute
25	Hamilton Tiger-Cats	Martin Disabatino	OT	Concordia
26	Calgary Stampeders	Parri Ceci	RB	Guelph

== 4th round ==
27. British Columbia Lions Joseph Brouwers DE Wilfrid Laurier

28. Saskatchewan Roughriders Ed McQuarters G Dakota N.W.

29. Saskatchewan Roughriders Angelo Visentin OT Saint Mary's

30. Saskatchewan Roughriders Peter Simpson OL Guelph

31. Calgary Stampeders Roman Lohin LB Alberta

32. Edmonton Eskimos Dan Runge TE Guelph

33. Saskatchewan Roughriders Greg Thomas TB Concordia

34. Hamilton Tiger-Cats Les Kaminski TB Montana State

35. Saskatchewan Roughriders Dave Sparenberg DL Western Ontario

== 5th round ==
36. British Columbia Lions Tim Tomlin DB Carleton

37. Montreal Concordes Bill Lawrence DB Simon Fraser

38. Winnipeg Blue Bombers Tom Hrechkosy DT Manitoba

39. Saskatchewan Roughriders Mike Ryan OT McMaster

40. Calgary Stampeders Corrado Filice TB Alberta

41. Edmonton Eskimos Larry Mohr FB Queen's

42. Saskatchewan Roughriders Wendell Cornwall LB British Columbia

43. Hamilton Tiger-Cats Tim Wiens DB Saskatchewan

44. Toronto Argonauts David Pearson SB Toronto

== 6th round ==
= CFL Division All-Star	= CFL All-Star	= Hall of Famer

Pick #	CFL team	Player	Position	School
45	BC Lions	Irv Daymond	G	Western Ontario
46	Montreal Concordes	George Voelk	DE	Saskatchewan
47	Winnipeg Blue Bombers	Doug Ploen	DB	North Dakota
48	Ottawa Rough Riders	Dave Maganja	OL	York
49	Calgary Stampeders	Derek Leers	DL	York
50	Edmonton Eskimos	Gio Chisotti	DB	Alberta
51	Saskatchewan Roughriders	Darcy Kopp	DB	Calgary
52	Hamilton Tiger-Cats	Mike Derks	C	Cincinnati
53	Toronto Argonauts	Mike Joyce	SB	York

== 7th round ==
54. British Columbia Lions Greg Kitchen LB British Columbia

55. Montreal Concordes Steve Lalonde WR Bishop's

56. Winnipeg Blue Bombers James Rybachuk DL British Columbia

57. Ottawa Rough Riders Mike White DB Waterloo

58. Calgary Stampeders John Harvie LB Calgary

59. Edmonton Eskimos Brad Clark WR Alberta

60. Saskatchewan Roughriders Ray Wheatley T Oregon

61. Hamilton Tiger-Cats Leroy Steele LB South Dakota State

62. Toronto Argonauts Adam Papadakos TE Toronto

== 8th round ==
= CFL Division All-Star	= CFL All-Star	= Hall of Famer

Pick #	CFL team	Player	Position	School
63	BC Lions	Brad Peperdy	CB	Saskatchewan
64	Montreal Concordes	Terry Baker	K/P	Mount Allison
65	Winnipeg Blue Bombers	Jim Stevens	DB	Manitoba
66	Ottawa Rough Riders	Barry Armstrong	DB	Ottawa
67	Calgary Stampeders	Wade Butteau	LB	Calgary
68	Edmonton Eskimos	Jeff Treftlin	DB	McMaster
69	Saskatchewan Roughriders	Carl Slipetz	DT	Illinois
70	Hamilton Tiger-Cats	George Fotopoulos	G	Mount Allison
71	Toronto Argonauts	Neil Fraser	DE	York
