= Billy Greene =

Canadian gridiron football player (born 1990)

No. 11
- Position: Quarterback

Personal information
- Born: April 12, 1990 (age 36)
- Listed height: 6 ft 1 in (1.85 m)
- Listed weight: 220 lb (100 kg)

Career information
- High school: Surrey (BC)
- University: UBC
- CFL draft: 2012: undrafted

Awards and highlights
- Hec Crighton Trophy (2011); First-team All-Canadian (2011)

Billy Greene (born April 12, 1990) is a Canadian former football quarterback. He played CIS football at UBC.

== Early life ==
Greene played high school football at Holy Cross Regional High School in Surrey, British Columbia.

== University career ==
Greene played CIS football at UBC for five seasons. In 2011, he led the nation in passing yards with 2,558 and was tied for most touchdown passes in the CIS with 20. His 482 rushing yards also led all CIS quarterbacks. Greene's passing yardage and passing touchdown totals set single-season school records. He won the Hec Crighton Trophy as the best CIS football player in 2011. Greene was also named a first team All-Canadian that season.

Greene was not selected in the 2012 CFL draft and did not sign with a CFL team, returning to UBC for his fifth year.
