= Pat Sheahan (Canadian football) =

Canadian gridiron football coach

Personal information
- Born: Pembroke, Ontario, Canada

Career information
- University: Concordia and McGill

Career history
- 1984–1988: McGill Redmen (Ass. HC)
- 1989–1999: Concordia Stingers (HC)
- 2000–2018: Queen's Gaels (HC)
- 2019–2021: Calgary Dinos (OC)
- 2022–2023: Guelph Gryphons (OLC 2024 - present Calgary Dinos OLC )

Awards and highlights
- CIS Coach of the Year (2008); 3× Vanier Cup champion (1987, 2009, 2019)

Pat Sheahan is U Sports Canadian football coach who serves as the offensive line coach for the Calgary Dinos. He spent 5 years as Assistant Head Coach at McGill University and 11 years as the head coach of the Concordia Stingers and another 19 years as head coach of the Queen's Gaels. Sheahan completed his full time career with 3 years as Assistant Head Coach/OC for the Calgary Dinos. He won three Vanier Cup championships, twice as an assistant coach in 1987 and 2019, and once as head coach in 2009. He was a five time conference Coach of the Year and named National Coach of the Year in 2008. Pat was inducted into the Queen’s Football Hall of Fame on September 26, 2025. Sheahan was also inducted into the Concordia Sports Hall of Fame in Montreal on April 10, 2026.

== University career ==
Sheahan was Team Captain twice and Concordia’s Academic Athlete while playing CIAU football as a tight end and offensive tackle for the Concordia Stingers from 1975 to 1979.

== Coaching career ==
Sheahan began his collegiate coaching career as the assistant head coach for the McGill Redmen in 1984 and held that position until 1988, winning a Vanier Cup championship in 1987. He was hired as head coach for the Concordia Stingers in 1989 and led the program to their first Vanier Cup appearance in 1998. He became head coach for the Queen's Gaels in 2000 and won his first Vanier Cup as a head coach in 2009. He was named CIS coach of the year in the 2008 season. After qualifying for the playoffs in just two out of five years, Sheahan was asked to resign following the 2018.

In 2019, Sheahan was named the offensive coordinator for the Calgary Dinos. In his first year, he won his third championship as the Dinos won the 55th Vanier Cup. The 2020 U Sports football season was cancelled, but he coached in one more season in 2021.

Sheahan announced his retirement on January 24, 2022. However, he later joined the Guelph Gryphons on March 10, 2022, as the team's offensive line coach. This reunited him with his son, Ryan Sheahan, who served as the team's head coach prior to becoming Head Coach of the Calgary Dinos in 2024. In April 2024 Sheahan agreed to re-unite with his son once again as Offensive Line Coach of the Calgary Dinos.
