= 1983 CFL draft =

Canadian football draft

The 1983 CFL draft composed of eight rounds where over 72 Canadian football players were chosen from eligible Canadian universities and Canadian players playing in the NCAA. A total of nine players were selected as territorial exemptions, with every team but Montreal making at least one selection during this stage of the draft.

== Territorial exemptions ==
British Columbia Lions Jim Mills OL Hawaii

Calgary Stampeders Greg Vavra QB Calgary

Edmonton Eskimos Blake Dermott OL Alberta

Hamilton Tiger-Cats Jim Pendergast TE Queen's

Ottawa Rough Riders Roger Cattelan OT Boston College

Ottawa Rough Riders (via Montreal) Mike Hudson TE Guelph

Saskatchewan Roughriders Scott Redl DE Saskatchewan

Toronto Argonauts Kelvin Pruenster OT Cal-Poly

Winnipeg Blue Bombers Scott Oliver LB Moorhead State

== 1st round ==
= CFL Division All-Star	= CFL All-Star	= Hall of Famer

Pick #	CFL team	Player	Position	School
1	Calgary Stampeders	Jerry Dobrovolny	T	British Columbia
2	Ottawa Rough Riders	Steve Harrison	LB	British Columbia
3	Saskatchewan Roughriders	Mike Emery	LB	British Columbia
4	Edmonton Eskimos	Pieter Vanden Bos	G	British Columbia
5	BC Lions	Jacques Chapdelaine	WR	Simon Fraser
6	Calgary Stampeders	Chris Byrne	RB	Western Ontario
7	Winnipeg Blue Bombers	Jason Riley	DE	British Columbia
8	BC Lions	Jamie Buis	T	Simon Fraser
9	Edmonton Eskimos	Tony Lawson	DE	McGill

== 2nd round ==
= CFL Division All-Star	= CFL All-Star	= Hall of Famer

Pick #	CFL team	Player	Position	School
10	Montreal Concordes	Mark Hopkins	LB	York
11	Ottawa Rough Riders	Junior Robinson	DB	Guelph
12	Saskatchewan Roughriders	Ray Elgaard	SB	Utah
13	Hamilton Tiger-Cats	Paul Palma	T	Concordia
14	BC Lions	Kevin Lapa	LB	Weber State
15	Calgary Stampeders	John Lynch	DB	Western Ontario
16	Edmonton Eskimos	Dale Kinney	DE	St. Francis Xavier
17	BC Lions	Peter LeClaire	FB	British Columbia
18	Edmonton Eskimos	Steve McAndrews	LB	Alberta

== 3rd round ==
19. Montreal Concordes Blake Nill DL Calgary

20. Ottawa Rough Riders Sam Benincasa LB Guelph

21. Saskatchewan Roughriders Richard White LB Simon Fraser

22. Hamilton Tiger-Cats Carey Lapa LB British Columbia

23. British Columbia Lions William Bickowski FB Wilfrid Laurier

24. Calgary Stampeders Bill Mintsoulis WR Toronto

25. Winnipeg Blue Bombers John Pitts LB Western Ontario

26. Toronto Argonauts Kevin Adams DB Waterloo

27. Edmonton Eskimos Rick Makos G Toronto

== 4th round ==
28. Montreal Concordes Jim Kardash TE Western Ontario

29. Ottawa Rough Riders John Kane OL Michigan State

30. Saskatchewan Roughriders Art Heier WR Waterloo

31. Hamilton Tiger-Cats Rory Radford LB Guelph

32. British Columbia Lions Jerome Erdman WR Simon Fraser

33. Calgary Stampeders Brian Strong OL Montana State

34. Winnipeg Blue Bombers Pat Cantner TE British Columbia

35. Toronto Argonauts Boyd Young DL Ottawa

36. Edmonton Eskimos Steve Hall DB Guelph

== 5th round ==
37. Montreal Concordes Steve Nagel DE Wilfrid Laurier

38. Ottawa Rough Riders Courtney Taylor DB Wilfrid Laurier

39. Saskatchewan Roughriders Joel Johnston FB Simon Fraser

40. Hamilton Tiger-Cats George Piva T British Columbia

41. British Columbia Lions Harold Jackman T Moorhead State

42. Calgary Stampeders Tim Petros TB Calgary

43. Winnipeg Blue Bombers Todd Turnbull G Wilfrid Laurier

44. Toronto Argonauts Bryan Black G Guelph

45. Edmonton Eskimos Jerry Philip DB York

== 6th round ==
46. Montreal Concordes Ed Slabikowski DB Windsor

47. Ottawa Rough Riders Francois Payer DE Bishop's

48. Saskatchewan Roughriders Todd McGauley DE Western Ontario

49. Hamilton Tiger-Cats David Brace TE Western Connecticut State

50. British Columbia Lions Kyle Barrow LB Western Ontario

51. Calgary Stampeders Matt Janes LB Western Ontario

52. Winnipeg Blue Bombers Fred Lyseyko LB Manitoba

53. Toronto Argonauts Joel Tynes TB St. Francis Xavier

54. Edmonton Eskimos Paul Hickle K Saskatchewan

== 7th round ==
55. Montreal Concordes Ken Ross DE Carleton

56. Ottawa Rough Riders Chris Rhora DE Acadia

57. Saskatchewan Roughriders Alain Groleau DB Ottawa

58. Hamilton Tiger-Cats Mike Zivolak C Western Ontario

59. British Columbia Lions Mike Brown DB Toronto

60. Calgary Stampeders Mike Kurchak K Nevada-Las Vegas

61. Winnipeg Blue Bombers Dave Bowness TE Manitoba

62. Toronto Argonauts Dave Waud LB Wilfrid Laurier

63. Edmonton Eskimos Gord Reinich SB Alberta

== 8th round ==
64. Montreal Concordes Scott Leckie DB Toronto

65. Ottawa Rough Riders Don Clow WR Acadia

66. Saskatchewan Roughriders Reindy Dundas DT Minot State

67. Hamilton Tiger-Cats Jack Kalthof LB Saskatchewan

68. British Columbia Lions Ken Munroe WR British Columbia

69. Calgary Stampeders Yorg Gromer TE Montana-Western

70. Winnipeg Blue Bombers Danny Jakobs DB Manitoba

71. Toronto Argonauts Rick Van Maanen DL Western Ontario

72. Edmonton Eskimos Jaimie Crawford QB Alberta
