= Dan Runge =

Canadian football player (born 1961)

No. 39, 93
- Positions: Slotback, tight end

Personal information
- Born: January 23, 1961 (age 65); Toronto, Ontario, Canada
- Listed height: 6 ft 9 in (2.06 m)
- Listed weight: 250 lb (113 kg)

Career information
- University: Guelph
- CFL draft: 1984: 4th round, 33rd overall pick

Career history
- Edmonton Eskimos (1984–1985); Calgary Stampeders (1985)

Awards and highlights
- Second-team OUAA All-Star (1982)

Daniel Runge (born January 23, 1961) is a Canadian former professional football player who played two seasons in the Canadian Football League (CFL) with the Edmonton Eskimos and Calgary Stampeders. He played CIAU football at the University of Guelph.

== Early life ==
Daniel Runge was born on January 23, 1961, in Toronto, Ontario. He first played football at Seneca College in Toronto, where he was a linebacker and receiver. He then played two years of CIAU football for the Guelph Gryphons of the University of Guelph from 1982 to 1983. Runge earned second-team OUAA All-Star honours in 1982 after catching 22 passes for 346 yards and one touchdown. He had 22 passes for 346 yards and one touchdown in 1983, only one less yard than the year before.

Runge was also part of the Canadian national handball team that won bronze at the 1983 Pan American Men's Handball Championship.

== Professional career ==
Runge was selected by the Edmonton Eskimos in the fourth round, with the 33rd overall pick, of the 1984 CFL draft. At 6'9", he was the tallest player in the CFL during his time in the league. Teammate Emilio Fraietta nicknamed Runge "Goliath" due to his size". Runge caught two touchdowns in his first preseason game on June 7 against the Saskatchewan Roughriders. He dressed in all 16 games for the Eskimos during the 1984 season and caught five passes for 82 yards. Edmonton finished 1984 with a 9–7 record and lost in the Western semifinal to the Winnipeg Blue Bombers by a score of 55–20. Runge dressed in the first seven games of the 1985 season for the Eskimos, recording eight receptions for 87 yards.

On August 29, 1985, it was reported that Runge had been traded to the Calgary Stampeders. He dressed in the final nine games of the season for the Stampeders, catching 19 passes for 224 yards, as Calgary went 3–13. He was released on June 20, 1986.
