= Roger Cattelan =

Canadian football player (born 1961)

No. 65
- Position: Offensive tackle

Personal information
- Born: July 3, 1961 (age 65); Joliette, Quebec, Canada
- Listed height: 6 ft 5 in (1.96 m)
- Listed weight: 270 lb (122 kg)

Career information
- High school: Assumption (Windsor, Ontario)
- College: Boston College

Career history
- Ottawa Rough Riders (1983–1987)

Awards and highlights
- CFL East All-Star (1985)

Roger Cattelan (born July 3, 1961) is a Canadian former professional football offensive tackle who played five seasons in the Canadian Football League (CFL) with the Ottawa Rough Riders. He played college football at Boston College.

== Early life and college ==
Roger Cattelan was born on July 3, 1961, in Joliette, Quebec. He was raised in Joliette but played high school football at Assumption College School in Windsor, Ontario, stating "High schools in Joliette don't provide much of a sports program." He first heard about Assumption after one of his friends started attending the school to improve his English. Cattelan was also a wrestler in high school and finished third in the nationals.

Cattelan played college football at Boston College, where he was a two-year letterman for the Eagles from 1981 to 1982. He missed the majority of the 1982 season due to an ankle injury. Boston College assistant coach Barry Gallup later said "Cattelan was very, very quiet and I never got the impression he really liked football." Cattelan graduated in spring 1982 with a business management degree.

== Professional career ==
Cattelan was a territorial protection of the Ottawa Rough Riders in the 1983 CFL draft. He was also selected by the Washington Federals in the 24th round, with the 285th overall pick, of the 1983 USFL draft. He signed a three-year contract with the Rough Riders on February 9, 1983, despite having a year of college eligibility remaining. Cattelan missed ten days of training camp in 1985 after walking out on the team for an unknown reason. However, he later returned and was named a CFL East All-Star for the 1985 season. In 1986, he missed a practice, claiming he had forgotten. On July 25, 1987, Cattelan disappeared before a game against the BC Lions. After numerous attempts to contact Cattelan failed, Rough Riders general manager Paul Robson filed a missing persons report with the Vancouver Police Department the next day. Later that day, Robson received word from Cattelan' brother-in-law that Cattelan was at a train station in Edmonton and would be heading back to Ottawa. He only dressed in seven games during the 1987 season and was also demoted to the practice roster for a period of time. He dressed in 73 games overall for Ottawa from 1983 to 1987. Cattelan retired on June 18, 1988, during the second day of training camp. He had reportedly been taking medication for panic attacks and also seeing a counselor.
