= Steve Hall (Canadian football) =

Australian gridiron football player (born 1960)

Profile
- Positions: Defensive back, Wide receiver

Personal information
- Born: March 19, 1960 (age 66); Brisbane, Australia
- Listed height: 6 ft 2 in (1.88 m)
- Listed weight: 192 lb (87 kg)

Career information
- University: Guelph
- CFL draft: 1983: 4th round, 36th overall pick

Career history
- 1983: Edmonton Eskimos*
- 1983: Winnipeg Blue Bombers
- 1983: Toronto Argonauts
- 1985: Ottawa Rough Riders
- * Offseason or practice squad member only

Steve Hall (born March 19, 1960) is an Australian former professional Canadian football player who played for the Winnipeg Blue Bombers, Toronto Argonauts, and Ottawa Rough Riders. He previously played at the University of Guelph. After his football career ended, Hall took up bobsledding, competing internationally for Canada's national team for several years.

He is the father of the first overall pick in the 2010 NHL Draft NHL player Taylor Hall , who currently plays for the Carolina Hurricanes.

Steve was a bobsled stuntman in the movie Cool Runnings.
