= Junior Robinson (defensive back, born 1961) =

Jamaican-Canadian football player (born 1961)

No. 28, 19, 16, 11
- Position: Defensive back

Personal information
- Born: August 11, 1961 (age 65); Kingston, Jamaica
- Listed height: 6 ft 0 in (1.83 m)
- Listed weight: 186 lb (84 kg)

Career information
- University: Guelph
- CFL draft: 1983: 2nd round, 11th overall pick

Career history
- Ottawa Rough Riders (1983–1985); Saskatchewan Roughriders (1985); Hamilton Tiger-Cats (1986); Edmonton Eskimos (1986)*; BC Lions (1986); Edmonton Eskimos (1987–1988); Winnipeg Blue Bombers (1989); Saskatchewan Roughriders (1989); Hamilton Tiger-Cats (1990)
- * Offseason or practice squad member only

Awards and highlights
- 2× Grey Cup champion (1987, 1989)

Junior Robinson (born August 11, 1961) is a Jamaican-Canadian former professional football defensive back who played in the Canadian Football League (CFL) from 1983 to 1990 with the Ottawa Rough Riders, Saskatchewan Roughriders, Hamilton Tiger-Cats, BC Lions, Edmonton Eskimos, and Winnipeg Blue Bombers. He played CIAU football for the Guelph Gryphons and was selected by the Rough Riders in the second round of the 1983 CFL draft.

== Early life ==
Junior Robinson was born on August 11, 1961, in Kingston, Jamaica. He later moved to Canada. He enrolled at the University of New Brunswick (UNB) to play CIAU football for the Red Bombers. He earned all-conference honors in 1980. Robinson transferred to the University of Guelph in 1981 after UNB dropped football. He earned CIAU All-Star honors in 1982.

== Professional career ==
Robinson was selected by the Ottawa Rough Riders in the second round, with the 11th overall pick, of the 1983 CFL draft. He dressed in all 16 games at safety for the Rough Riders in 1983, recording 42 solo tackles, 31 assisted tackles, four interceptions for 41 yards, one sack, and one fumble recovery. He was the team's nominee for the CFL's Most Outstanding Rookie Award. Robinson only dressed in nine games in 1984 due to injury. On June 25, 1985, it was reported that he had been placed on the 60-day injured list after injuring his knee. Robinson was transferred to the reserve list in late August.

On September 23, 1985, the Rough Riders traded Robinson, Daric Zeno, and Gary Lewis to the Saskatchewan Roughriders for Jeff Roberts, Robert Reid, and Stephen Jones. Robinson dressed in four games as a backup safety during the 1985 season. He was released on June 12, 1986, after the first game of the 1986 preseason.

On July 8, 1986, was signed to the practice roster of the Hamilton Tiger-Cats. He was later promoted to the active roster and dressed in two games for Hamilton in 1986. He was released in mid-September 1986.

Robinson was signed to the Edmonton Eskimos' practice roster in early October 1986. By early November 1986, he had joined the BC Lions's practice roster. He was promoted to the Lions' active roster and played in one game for them during the 1986 season.

Robinson signed with the Eskimos again in 1987. He began the 1987 season as the starting safety. He played in all 18 games for Edmonton in 1987, posting 41 tackles, one interception, three fumble recoveries, and one punt return for three yards. The Eskimos finished the year with an 11–7 record and won the 75th Grey Cup against the Toronto Argonauts by a score of 38–36. Robinson dressed in 17 games in 1988 but was only credited with one tackle and one punt return for no yards. During the 1989 offseason, he asked to be traded to an Eastern team. He then retired but rescinded his retirement in May.

On June 30, 1989, Robinson, Less Browne, and Darryl Gaines, were traded to the Winnipeg Blue Bombers for future considerations. Robinson dressed in one game for the Blue Bombers before being released on July 19, 1989.

Robinson then joined the Roughriders in late July 1989, and was converted to linebacker. He played in 11 games for Saskatchewan in 1989 and made nine tackles. He was on the practice roster when the Roughriders won the 77th Grey Cup against the Tiger-Cats.

Robinson signed with the Tiger-Cats again in May 1990. He played in seven games for the Tiger-Cats in 1990, posting five tackles and one punt return for two yards. He also spent some time on the practice roster and missed time due to a hamstring injury. Robinson was released by Hamilton in early November 1990.

== Personal life ==
Robinson was living in Montreal as of 1983.
