= 51st Vanier Cup =

2015 Canadian university gridiron football championship

UBC Thunderbirds	Montreal Carabins
(9–2)	(9–2)
26	23
Head coach: Blake Nill	Head coach: Danny Maciocia
	1	2	3	4	Total
UBC Thunderbirds	6	10	7	3	26
Montreal Carabins	0	10	6	7	23
- Date: November 28, 2015
- Stadium: Telus Stadium
- Location: Quebec City, QC
- Ted Morris Memorial Trophy: Michael O'Connor, UBC
- Bruce Coulter Award: Stavros Katsantonis, UBC
- National anthem: Laval University; Faculty of Music
- Kick-off: Felix Ménard-Brière, Montreal
- Referee: Henry Chiu
- Attendance: 12,557

Broadcasters
- Network: TV: Sportsnet, TVA Sports
- Announcers: Tim Micallef and Mike Morreale, Sportsnet
- Ratings: 311,000 on Sportsnet

The 2015 Vanier Cup, the 51st edition of the Canadian university football championship, took place on Saturday, November 28, 2015 at Telus Stadium in Quebec City, Quebec. It was the fourth time that the city of Quebec has hosted the Vanier Cup. For the third consecutive year the championship game was played in the province of Quebec. The game featured the Canada West Champion UBC Thunderbirds and the RSEQ Champion Montreal Carabins. This was the second appearance for the Carabins - in back-to-back years - and the sixth for the Thunderbirds.

== Semi-Championships ==
The Vanier Cup is played between the champions of the Mitchell Bowl and the Uteck Bowl, the national semi-final games. In 2015, according to the rotating schedule, the Canada West Hardy Trophy championship team visited the Atlantic conference's Loney Bowl championship team for the Uteck Bowl. The winners of the Québec conference Dunsmore Cup visited the Yates Cup Ontario championship team for the Mitchell Bowl.

== Scoring summary ==
First Quarter
UBC - van Gylswyk 45 yd field goal (12:44)
UBC - van Gylswyk 33 yd field goal (07:46)

Second Quarter
UBC - Davis 6 yd touchdown and converted (13:51)
UBC - van Gylswyk 43 yd field goal (06:21)
MON - Paquet 12 yd touchdown and converted (02:59)
MON - Deschamps 15 yd field goal (00:00)

Third Quarter
UBC - Deschamps 44 yd touchdown and converted (09:23)
MON - Deschamps 22 yd field goal (04:11)
MON - Deschamps 12 yd field goal (00:12)

Fourth Quarter
MON - Nadeau-Piuze 6 yd touchdown and converted (07:45)
UBC - van Gylswyk 20 yd field goal (00:00)

== Playoff bracket ==
Conference Quarter-finals
Carleton	39
Queen's	8
Laurier	29
McMaster	15

Conference Semi-finals
Manitoba	10
UBC	52
Saskatchewan	29
Calgary	37
Acadia	4
St. FX	26
Sherbrooke	24
Montreal	31
Concordia	8
Laval	52
Carleton	21
Guelph	33
Laurier	18
Western	32

Conference Championships
UBC	34
Calgary	26
St. FX	14
Mount Allison	12
Montreal	18
Laval	16
Guelph	23
Western	17

National Semi-finals
UBC	36
St. FX	9
Montreal	25
Guelph	10

51st Vanier Cup
UBC	26
Montreal	23

The seed of the OUA Semi-Final is done so that the first-place team play the weakest team still alive.
