= Ryan Baker (Canadian football) =

Canadian gridiron football player (born 2001)

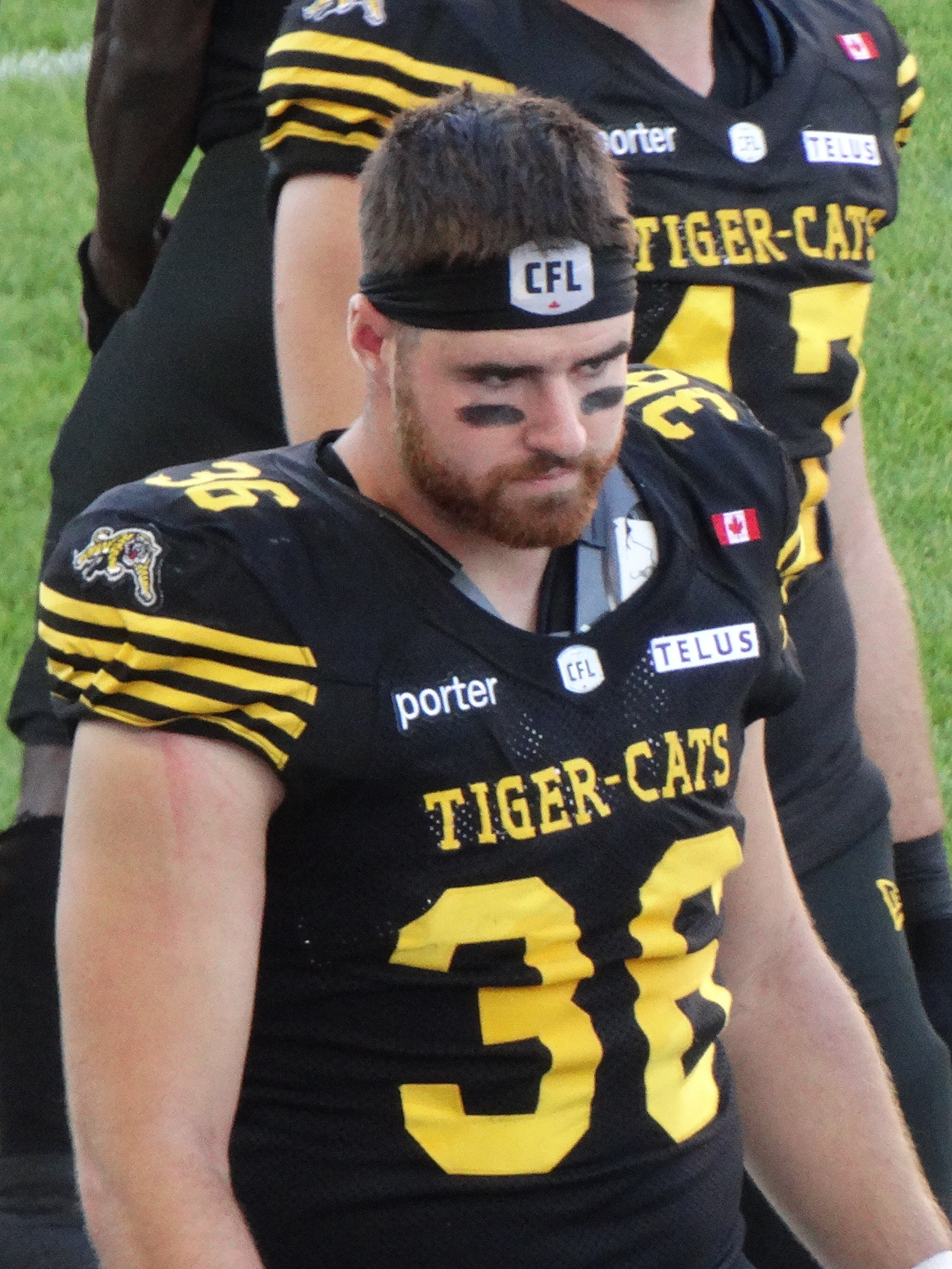
- Baker with the Hamilton Tiger-Cats in 2025

No. 36 – Hamilton Tiger-Cats
- Position: Linebacker
- Roster status: Active
- CFL status: National

Personal information
- Born: April 6, 2000 (age 26); North Vancouver, British Columbia, Canada
- Listed height: 6 ft 1 in (1.85 m)
- Listed weight: 221 lb (100 kg)

Career information
- University: UBC (2018–2023)
- CFL draft: 2024: 5th round, 43rd overall pick

Career history
- 2025–present: Hamilton Tiger-Cats
- Stats at CFL.ca

Ryan Baker (born April 6, 2000) is a Canadian professional football linebacker for the Hamilton Tiger-Cats of the Canadian Football League (CFL).

== University career ==
Baker played U Sports football for the UBC Thunderbirds from 2018 to 2023. He did not play in 2020 due to the cancellation of the 2020 U Sports football season, but over five seasons, he played in 32 games where he had 221 total tackles, including ten tackles for loss, 5.5 quarterback sacks, one forced fumble, three fumble recoveries, and one interception.

== Professional career ==
Pre-draft measurables
Height	Weight	40-yard dash	20-yard shuttle	Three-cone drill	Vertical jump	Broad jump	Bench press
6 ft 1 1/4 in (1.86 m)	221 lb (100 kg)	5.03 s	4.46 s	7.26 s	33.5 in (0.85 m)	9 ft 1 1/8 in (2.77 m)	11 reps
All values from CFL Combine

Baker was selected by the Hamilton Tiger-Cats in the fifth round, 43rd overall, of the 2024 CFL draft and signed with the team on May 9, 2024. Following training camp in 2024, he accepted a practice roster position, but soon made his professional debut on July 20, 2024, against the Toronto Argonauts. He dressed in 13 regular season games, starting in eight, where he recorded 42 defensive tackles and three special tackles.

On June 29, 2026, Baker signed a contract extension with the Tiger-Cats, keeping him with the team through the 2027 season.
