= 33rd Vanier Cup =

1997 Canadian university football championship

UBC Thunderbirds	Ottawa Gee-Gees
(5–2–1)	(6–2)
39	23
Head coach: Casey Smith	Head coach: Larry Ring
	1	2	3	4	Total
UBC Thunderbirds	9	10	10	10	39
Ottawa Gee-Gees	1	6	0	16	23
- Date: November 22, 1997
- Stadium: SkyDome
- Location: Toronto
- Ted Morris Memorial Trophy: Stuart Scherck, LB, UBC
- Bruce Coulter Award: Mark Nohra, RB, UBC
- Attendance: 8,184

The 33rd Vanier Cup was played on November 22, 1997, at the SkyDome in Toronto, Ontario, and decided the CIAU football champion for the 1997 season. The UBC Thunderbirds won their third championship by defeating the Ottawa Gee-Gees by a score of 39-23.

== Game summary ==
UBC Thunderbirds (39) - TDs, Shawn Olson, Frank Luisser, Mark Nohra (2); FGs, Aaron Roed (4); cons., Aaron Roed (3).

Ottawa Gee-Gees (23) - TDs, Ousmane Tounkara, Haluke; FGs, McNeice (4); 2-point cons., Ibrahim Tounkara (2); singles, Watters.

=== Scoring summary ===
First Quarter
UBC - FG Roed 23 (4:29)
UBC - TD Olson 1 run (convert failed) (9:10)
OTT - Single Watters 54 (14:54)

Second Quarter
OTT - FG McNeice 14 (2:10)
UBC - TD Luisser 29 pass from Olson (Roed Convert) (7:45)
OTT - FG McNeice 44 (14:37)
UBC - FG Roed 21 (15:00)

Third Quarter
UBC - FG Roed 23 (10:53)
UBC - TD Nohra 1 run (Roed convert) (15:00)

Fourth Quarter
UBC - FG Roed 42 (2:50)
UBC - TD Nohra 19 run (Roed convert) (5:23)
OTT - TD O. Tounkara 1 run (I. Tounkara pass from Côté) (12:32)
OTT - TD Haluke 11 pass from Côté (I. Tounkara pass from Côté) (13:06)
