= Michael O'Connor (Canadian football) =

Canadian gridiron football player (born 1996)

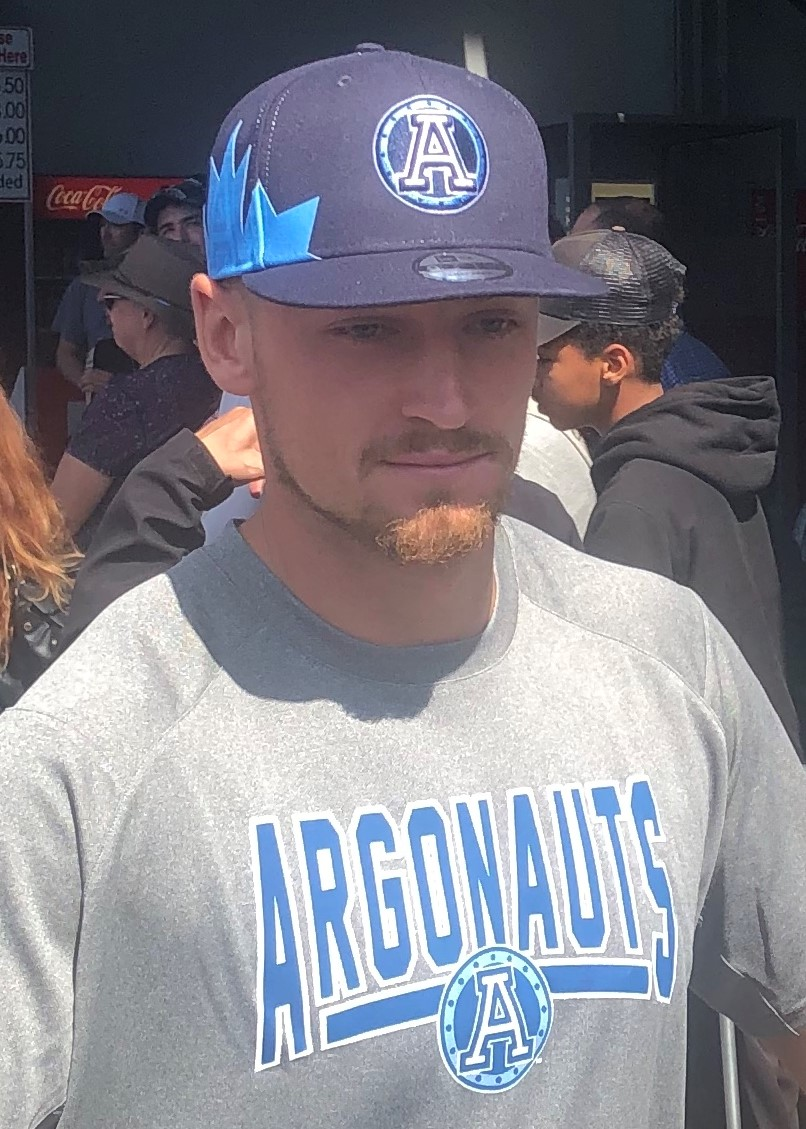
- O'Connor with the Toronto Argonauts in 2019

No. 13, 15, 11
- Position: Quarterback

Personal information
- Born: February 25, 1996 (age 30); Orleans, Ontario, Canada
- Listed height: 6 ft 4 in (1.93 m)
- Listed weight: 230 lb (104 kg)

Career information
- High school: Ashbury College; Baylor School; IMG Academy
- College: Penn State
- University: British Columbia
- CFL draft: 2019: 3rd round, 20th overall pick

Career history
- 2019–2020: Toronto Argonauts
- 2021: Calgary Stampeders
- 2022: BC Lions

Awards and highlights
- Vanier Cup champion (2015); Ted Morris Memorial Trophy (2015)
- Stats at CFL.ca

Michael O'Connor (born February 25, 1996) is a Canadian former professional football quarterback who played in the Canadian Football League (CFL) with the Toronto Argonauts, Calgary Stampeders, and BC Lions. He played college football with the UBC Thunderbirds from 2015 to 2018 where he led the team to a Vanier Cup championship in 2015.

== College career ==
=== Penn State ===
O'Connor received several scholarship offers to play football and was named ESPN's sixth-ranked quarterback in the 2014 recruiting class. The 4-star recruit ultimately chose Pennsylvania State University to play for then-head coach, Bill O'Brien, and the Nittany Lions. O'Brien had resigned to accept a position as the Houston Texans' head coach, but O'Connor elected to continue with his decision to enroll at Penn State anyway. He redshirted during his first season there behind the incumbent starter, Christian Hackenberg. Near the end of the 2014 season, O'Connor announced his intention to transfer schools.

=== UBC ===
On February 12, 2015, it was formally announced that O'Connor had committed to play for Blake Nill and the UBC Thunderbirds. As a freshman starter, he had immediate success, starting in all eight games, posting 165 completions on 276 pass attempts for 2383 yards, 13 touchdowns, and five interceptions to lead UBC to a 6–2 regular season record. He led the team to a perfect 4–0 record in the post-season, including UBC's 51st Vanier Cup championship win where he was named the game's most valuable player.

=== Collegiate statistics ===
		Passing								Rushing
Year	Team	GD	GS	Att	Comp	Pct	Yards	TD	Int	Att	Yards	Avg	Long	TD
2014	PSU	0	0	0	0	0	0	0	0	0	0	0.0	0	0
2015	UBC	11	–	465	284	60.4	3,959	23	10	38	224	5.6	45	2
2016	UBC	11	–	455	277	60.9	3,577	22	14	28	239	8.5	22	1
2017	UBC	11	–	365	250	68.5	3,216	25	8	18	128	10.7	12	1
2018	UBC	9	–	356	249	68.2	3,131	17	5	15	78	5.2	25	1
Totals		42	–	1641	1060	64.6	12,833	87	37	99	669	6.7	45	5

== Professional career ==
Pre-draft measurables
Height	Weight	20-yard shuttle	Three-cone drill	Vertical jump	Broad jump	Bench press
6 ft 4 7/8 in (1.95 m)	228 lb (103 kg)	4.62 s	7.50 s	29.0 in (0.74 m)	9 ft 2 5/8 in (2.81 m)	14 reps
All values from CFL Combine

=== Toronto Argonauts ===
Attracting the attention of professional leagues, O'Connor was ranked as the 17th best prospect in the Canadian Football League's Central Scouting Bureau Final Rankings. Consequently, he was drafted in the third round, 20th overall, in the 2019 CFL draft by the Toronto Argonauts and signed with the team on May 17, 2019.

He began the 2019 season on the Argonauts' injured list, but dressed in his first professional game on July 6, 2019, against the BC Lions. With Argonauts eliminated from the playoffs, O'Connor took his first regular season snaps under centre on October 26, 2019, against his hometown Ottawa Redblacks. In that game, he threw his first career touchdown pass; an 11-yard completion to Rodney Smith. Smith had thrown the ball into the stands, but the fan who retrieved it threw the keepsake back to Argos staff members.

O'Connor dressed for nine games his rookie season, and saw snaps in two. He completed 15 passes out of 25 attempts for 173 yards and a touchdown. He did not play in 2020 due to the cancellation of the 2020 CFL season and he became a free agent in 2021 following the completion of his rookie contract.

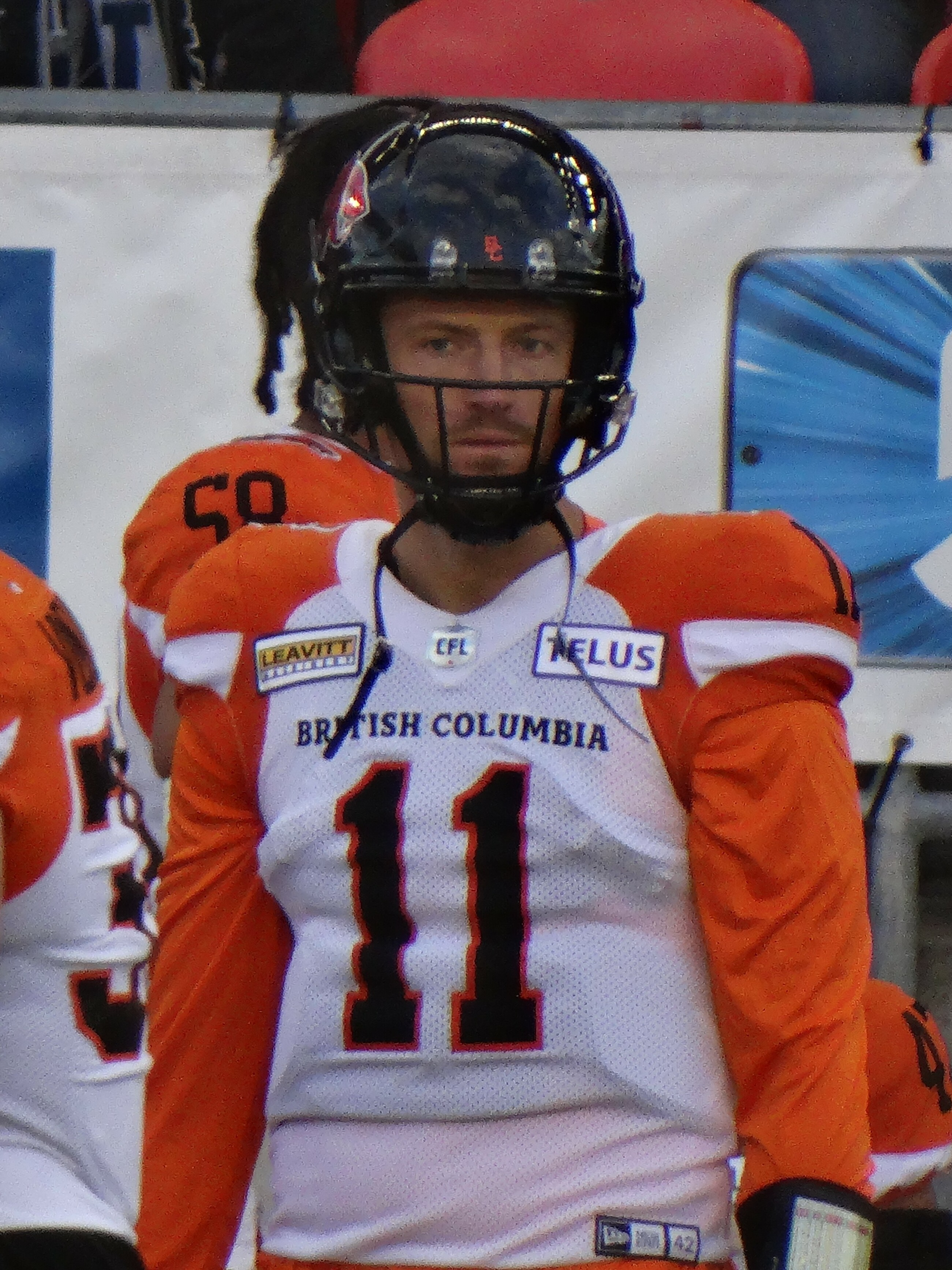
O'Connor with the BC Lions in 2022

=== Calgary Stampeders ===
On the first day of free agency in 2021, O'Connor signed with the Calgary Stampeders on February 9, 2021. He initially began the year as the backup quarterback, but was relegated to the third-string position following strong performances by Jake Maier. O'Connor dressed in six regular season games but did not attempt a pass as he ran the short-yardage team where he had four rush attempts for five yards. He became a free agent upon the expiry of his contract on February 8, 2022.

=== BC Lions ===
On the first day of free agency, on February 8, 2022, O'Connor signed with the BC Lions. He began the season as the backup quarterback to fellow Canadian quarterback Nathan Rourke. When Rourke suffered a significant foot injury in Week 11 O'Connor was named the starting quarterback the following week. Unfortunately, he suffered a groin injury in the second quarter and was ruled out for the remainder of the game. He sat out one game due to injury, but did not see any playing time upon his return to the lineup following the team's acquisition of Vernon Adams. He became a free agent upon the expiry of his contract on February 14, 2023.

=== CFL statistics ===
Season	League	Team	Games		Passing						Rushing			
Season	League	Team	GP	GS	Comp	Att	Pct	Yds	TD	Int	Att	Yds	Yd/Att	TD
2019	CFL	TOR	9	0	15	25	0.0	173	1	0	1	1	1.0	0
2021	CFL	CAL	6	0	0	0	0.0	0	0	0	4	5	1.3	0
2022	CFL	BC	17	1	15	27	55.6	157	0	1	1	1	1.0	1

== Flag football ==
Following his time in the NFL, O'Connor has played for several years as the quarterback for the Canada men's national flag football team, winning several medals in tournaments and qualifying for the 2028 Olympics.

== Personal life ==
O'Connor was born to Debbie Lavigne and John O'Connor and he grew up in Ottawa. He was named after his uncle who died in a vehicle collision two months before he was born.

== Awards and honours ==
- 2016 UBC Thunderbirds Male Athlete of the Year Co-winner
