= Doug Daigneault =

Canadian gridiron football player (born 1937)

Profile
- Positions: Defensive back, offensive back

Personal information
- Born: September 30, 1937 (age 89); Salaberry-de-Valleyfield, Quebec, Canada
- Listed height: 6 ft 1 in (1.85 m)
- Listed weight: 191 lb (87 kg)

Career information
- College: Clemson

Career history
- 1960–1963: Ottawa Rough Riders
- 1963–1963: Winnipeg Blue Bombers
- 1964–1965: Montreal Alouettes

Awards and highlights
- Grey Cup champion (1960)

Doug Daigneault was a Canadian Football League player whose main position was defensive back. He played for three teams from 1960 to 1965 and was part of the Ottawa Rough Riders' 48th Grey Cup-winning team in 1960.

Daigneault was born in Valleyfield, Quebec. After playing college football at Clemson University and participating in three major bowl games, he joined the Ottawa Rough Riders in 1960, the year they won the 48th Grey Cup, until 1963, while playing both offensive and defensive back, mostly the latter. In 1961, he intercepted five passes, his highest total ever. He also rushed for the only touchdown of his career. Injuries limited him to only six games in 196,2 and he played four games for Ottawa in 1963 before being traded to the Winnipeg Blue Bombers, where he finished the season with one interception. In 1964, he was traded back east to the Montreal Alouettes, where he remained until 1965, playing in all 14 games during both seasons before retiring.

After his CFL career, Daigneault became basketball coach from 1966 to 1989 and assistant athletic director at Loyola College (later Concordia University). He won the coach of the year award in the Quebec conference during the 1984–85 season. He was also active in the Montreal Alouette Alumni Association.
