= 34th Vanier Cup =

1998 Canadian university football championship

Concordia Stingers	Saskatchewan Huskies
(6–2)	(6–2)
17	24
Head coach: Pat Sheahan	Head coach: Brian Towriss
	1	2	3	4	Total
Concordia Stingers	0	3	14	0	17
Saskatchewan Huskies	3	7	4	10	24
- Date: November 28, 1998
- Stadium: SkyDome
- Location: Toronto
- Ted Morris Memorial Trophy: Trevor Ludtke, LB, Saskatchewan
- Bruce Coulter Award: Doug Rozon, RB, Saskatchewan
- Attendance: 15,157

The 34th Vanier Cup was played on November 28, 1998, at the SkyDome in Toronto, Ontario, and decided the CIAU football champion for the 1998 season. The Saskatchewan Huskies won their third championship by defeating the Concordia Stingers by a score of 24-17.

== Game summary ==
Saskatchewan Huskies (24) - TDs, Todd Lynden, Trevor Ludtke; FGs, Matt Kellett (3); cons., Matt Kellett (4); singles, Matt Kellett.

Concordia Stingers (17) - TDs, Evan Davis Jr., Greg Casey; cons., Dave Miller-Johnston (3).

=== Scoring summary ===
First Quarter
SSK - FG Kellett 28 (3:00)

Second Quarter
CON - FG Miller-Johnston 35 (6:20)
SSK - TD Lynden 9 pass from Reid (Kellett Convert) (13:04)

Third Quarter
SSK - Single Kellett 49 (2:35)
CON - TD Davis 55 run (Miller-Johnston convert) (5:53)
SSK - FG Kellett 27 (13:21)
CON - TD Casey 56 interception return (Miller-Johnston convert) (14:44)

Fourth Quarter
SSK - FG Kellett 40 (10:27)
SSK - TD Ludtke fumble recovery in end zone (Kellett convert) (12:52)
