= Frank Balkovec =

Canadian football player (born 1959)

Profile
- Position: Linebacker

Personal information
- Born: November 26, 1959 (age 66); Novo Mesto, Yugoslavia (now Slovenia)
- Listed height: 6 ft 0 in (1.83 m)
- Listed weight: 235 lb (107 kg)

Career information
- College: Toronto
- CFL draft: 1984: 1st round, 1st overall pick

Career history
- 1984–1987: Edmonton Eskimos
- 1988–1989: Calgary Stampeders
- 1990–1991: Ottawa Rough Riders

Awards and highlights
- Grey Cup champion (1987)

Frank Balkovec (born November 26, 1959) is a former professional Canadian football linebacker who played for eight seasons for the Edmonton Eskimos, Calgary Stampeders, and Ottawa Rough Riders. He was drafted first overall in the 1984 CFL draft by the BC Lions. He played college football for the Toronto Varsity Blues.
