= Frank Smith (Canadian football) =

Canadian football player (1931–2025)

Profile
- Position: Guard

Personal information
- Born: 1931; Vancouver, British Columbia, Canada
- Died: October 6, 2025 (aged 94)
- Listed height: 6 ft 1 in (1.85 m)
- Listed weight: 195 lb (88 kg)

Career information
- College: Olympic College

Career history
- 1953: Calgary Stampeders
- 1954: Edmonton Eskimos
- 1955: BC Lions
- 1956: Winnipeg Blue Bombers

Awards and highlights
- Grey Cup champion (1954)
- Canadian Football Hall of Fame (Class of 2019)

Frank Smith (1931 – October 6, 2025) was a Canadian professional football player and coach. He played professionally for the Edmonton Eskimos. He won the Grey Cup with them in 1954, 1955 and 1956. Smith attended Olympic College, where he played junior college football.

Smith coached football at Eastern Washington University, Wenatchee Valley College, and Montana State University. In 1973, he took a position at the University of British Columbia, coaching until 1994, during which time he won five conference titles and Canadian Interuniversity Sport championships in 1982 and 1986. His final record with UBC was 126–90–4. He was hired to the coaching staff of the BC Lions in 1997, 1998 and 2000 and also served on the coaching staff of the Saskatchewan Roughriders. He was inducted in the UBC Sports Hall of Fame as a builder in 2012.

Smith died on October 6, 2025, at the age of 94.

== Head coaching record ==
=== Junior college ===
| Year | Team | Overall | Conference | Standing | Bowl/playoffs |
|---|---|---|---|---|---|
Wenatchee Valley Knights (Washington Junior College Conference / Washington Community College Conference) (1966–1967)
| 1966 | Wenatchee Valley | 3–6 | 1–5 | 6th | |
| 1967 | Wenatchee Valley | 3–6–1 | 1–5–1 | 7th | |
| Wenatchee Valley: | | 6–12–1 | 2–10–1 | | |
| Total: | | 6–12–1 | | | |
