= Mark Nohra =

Lebanese gridiron football player (born 1973)

Profile
- Position: Running back

Personal information
- Born: October 23, 1973 (age 53); Beirut, Lebanon

Career information
- College: University of British Columbia
- CFL draft: 1997: 4 / Pick 28th round

Career history
- 1998–1999: BC Lions
- 2000–2001: Edmonton Eskimos
- 2001: Scottish Claymores
- 2002: Ottawa Renegades
- 2003–2004: BC Lions
- 2006: BC Lions

Awards and highlights
- Hec Crighton Trophy (1997)

Mark Nohra (born October 23, 1973) is a former running back and fullback with the Canadian Football League (CFL)'s B.C. Lions.

He attended the University of British Columbia and is 5 feet 11 inches tall and 228 lbs. He has spent 8 years in the CFL with 3 teams. He was drafted by the Hamilton Tiger-Cats in 1997 (4th round, 28th overall) and signed by the Buffalo Bills of the National Football League in 1998. The Bills released him at the end of training camp and Nohra was signed by the Lions in September 1998. He played a combined 17 games from 1998 to 1999 with B.C. From 2000 to 2001, he had his most successful years with the Edmonton Eskimos. In 2000, he was 9th in the CFL with a career-high 760 yards gained. That year, he also had a career-high 5 touchdowns. Nohra led Edmonton with 666 yards after playing 2 games in NFL Europe with the Scottish Claymores in 2001. That was after he was sent to NFL Europe by the Atlanta Falcons. The Ottawa Renegades signed him for the 2002 season where he played 14 games and had his last touchdown. In June 2003, he was signed to his second stint with the Lions. He played 9 games in 2003, 2 in 2004, none in 2005 and 13 in 2006. Nohra was injured when the Lions won the 2006 Grey Cup Nohra was released by the B.C. Lions after having knee surgery in 2007.

Before Mark Nohra went pro he played for the UBC Thunderbirds. November 1997 Mark Nohra has one of UBC's best-ever seasons. This season he is selected an All-Canadian, the CIS's outstanding football player and winner of the Hec Crighton Trophy, leads UBC to a Vanier Cup championship and is game co- MVP, sets three UBC season rushing records, wins the Bobby Gaul Award and receives an invitation to the camp of the Buffalo Bills. Mark Nohra was the first Thunderbird to ever win the Vanier Cup and Hec Crighton Trophy in the same year.
