= Matt Kellett =

Canadian football player (born 1973)

Profile
- Position: Kicker

Personal information
- Born: May 4, 1973 (age 53); Regina, Saskatchewan

Career information
- University: Saskatchewan

Career history
- 1998, 2001–2002: BC Lions
- 1999–2001: Edmonton Eskimos
- 2003–2004: Montreal Alouettes
- 2005: Ottawa Renegades

Matt Kellett (born May 4, 1973, in Regina, Saskatchewan) is a former placekicker who played eight seasons in the Canadian Football League for the British Columbia Lions from 1998, 2001–2002, the Edmonton Eskimos from 1999 to 2001, the Montreal Alouettes in 2004 and the Ottawa Renegades in 2005 of the Canadian Football League. He won one Grey Cup, when he played for the Lions.
