= 18th Vanier Cup =

1982 Canadian university football championship

| UBC Thunderbirds | Western Mustangs |
|---|---|
| (7–1) | (5–2) |
| 39 | 14 |
| Head coach: Frank Smith | Head coach: Darwin Semotiuk |
| | 1 | 2 | 3 | 4 | Total |
|---|---|---|---|---|---|
| UBC Thunderbirds | 0 | 0 | 0 | 39 | 39 |
| Western Mustangs | 0 | 0 | 0 | 14 | 14 |
- Date: November 20, 1982
- Stadium: Varsity Stadium
- Location: Toronto
- Ted Morris Memorial Trophy: Glenn Steele, UBC
- Attendance: 14,759

The 18th Vanier Cup was played on November 20, 1982, at Varsity Stadium in Toronto, Ontario, and decided the CIAU football champion for the 1982 season. The UBC Thunderbirds won their first ever championship by defeating the Western Mustangs by a score of 39-14.
