= Russ Jackson Award =

The Russ Jackson Award is presented to the U Sports Football player best exemplifying the attributes of academic achievement, football skill, and citizenship and is named in honour of Canadian Football League Hall of Famer and former Ottawa Rough Riders and McMaster University quarterback, Russ Jackson.

== List of Russ Jackson award winners ==
Year	Athlete	Team
1986	Charlie Galunic	Queen's Golden Gaels
1987	Elio Geremia	Calgary Dinos
1988	Andrew Allison	Mount Allison Mounties
1989	Jock Climie	Queen's Golden Gaels
1990	J.P. Veri	McGill Redmen
1991	J.P. Veri	McGill Redmen
1992	David Sykes	Saint Mary's Huskies
1993	David Sykes	Saint Mary's Huskies
1994	Steve Papp	McGill Redmen
1995	Ted MacLean	Saint Mary's Huskies
1996	Sean O'Neill	Carleton Ravens
1997	Sam Stetsko	Alberta Golden Bears
1998	Jean-Philippe Darche	McGill Redmen
1999	Carlo Panaro	Alberta Golden Bears
2000	Carlo Panaro	Alberta Golden Bears
2001	Josh Alexander	Wilfrid Laurier Golden Hawks
2002	Lincoln Blumell	Calgary Dinos
2003	Curt McLellan	Queen's Golden Gaels
2004	Nathan Beveridge	UBC Thunderbirds
2005	Dan Parker	Mount Allison Mounties
2006	Naim El-Far	Ottawa Gee Gees
2007	Clovis Langlois-Boucher	Sherbrooke Vert-et-Or
2008	David Hamilton	Toronto Varsity Blues
2009	Thomas Hall	Manitoba Bisons
2010	Thomas Hall	Manitoba Bisons
2011	Dillon Heap	Wilfrid Laurier Golden Hawks
2012	Zach Androschuk	Guelph Gryphons
2013	Andrew Buckley	Calgary Dinos
2014	Andrew Buckley	Calgary Dinos
2015	Curtis Carmichael	Queen's Golden Gaels
2016	Cameron Teschuk	Manitoba Bisons
2017	Nick Vanin	Western Mustangs
2018	Mackenzie Ferguson	Western Mustangs
2019	Jacob Janke	York Lions
2021	Francis Perron	Ottawa Gee-Gees
2022	Duncan Patterson	Saint Mary's Huskies
2023	Mark Rauhaus	Manitoba Bisons
2024	Ryker Frank	Saskatchewan Huskies
2025	Chevy Thomas	Alberta Golden Bears

== See also ==
- Hec Crighton Trophy
- Presidents' Trophy
- Peter Gorman Trophy
- J. P. Metras Trophy
