= Presidents' Trophy (U Sports) =

The Presidents' Trophy is an annual Canadian sports award presented to the most outstanding defensive player in U Sports football. The trophy was first presented in 1980 after having been championed by two past presidents of Canadian university sports bodies. The name indirectly honours Ed Zemrau, past president of U Sports (then known as the Canadian Interuniversity Athletics Union); and Robert Doty, past president of Canada's university football championship game, then known as the College Bowl and now as the Vanier Cup.

== List of Presidents' Trophy winners ==
Year	Winner	School
1980	Rich Payne	Wilfrid Laurier
1981	Mike Emery	UBC
1982	Mike Emery	UBC
1983	Tom Timlin	Carleton
1984	Larry Oglesby	Mount Allison
1985	Darcy Kopp	Calgary
1986	Mark Norman	UBC
1987	Brent Lewis	Western
1988	Leroy Blugh	Bishop's
1989	Mark Singer	Alberta
1990	Randy Power	Mount Allison
1991	Ray Bernard	Bishop's
1992	Alex Eliopoulos	Saint Mary's
1993	Lou Tiro	Toronto
1994	Cory Delaney	Waterloo
1995	Paul Frlan	StFX
1996	Derek Krete	Western
1997	Jason Van Geel	Waterloo
1998	Warren Muzika	Saskatchewan
1999	Mike Letendre	Saskatchewan
2000	Joey Mikawoz	Manitoba
2001	David Stipe	Bishop's
2002	Adam MacDonald	StFX
2003	Neil McKinlay	Simon Fraser
2004	Mickey Donovan	Concordia
2005	Patrick Donovan	Concordia
2006	Patrick Donovan	Concordia
2007	Mat Nesbitt	Regina
2008	Thaine Carter	Queen's
2009	Cory Greenwood	Concordia
2010	Henoc Muamba	StFX
2011	Max Caron	Concordia
2012	Frédéric Plesius	Laval
2013	Pawel Kruba	Western
2014	Jonathan Langa	Saint Mary's
2015	John Rush	Guelph
2016	D. J. Lalama	Manitoba
2017	Adam Auclair	Laval
2018	Fraser Sopik	Western
2019	Nelson Lokombo	Saskatchewan
2021	Josiah Schakel	Alberta
2022	Nicky Farinaccio	Montreal
2023	Harold Miessan	Montreal
2024	Nate Beauchemin	Calgary
2025	Seth Hundeby	Saskatchewan

== See also ==
- Hec Crighton Trophy
- J. P. Metras Trophy
- Peter Gorman Trophy
- Russ Jackson Award
