= 2009 CIS football season =

- Duration: August 29, 2009 – October 31, 2009
- Hardy Cup champions: Calgary Dinos
- Yates Cup champions: Queen's Golden Gaels
- Dunsmore Cup champions: Laval Rouge et Or
- Loney Bowl champions: Saint Mary's Huskies
- Mitchell Bowl champions: Queen's Golden Gaels
- Uteck Bowl champions: Calgary Dinos

Vanier Cup
- Date: November 28, 2009
- Venue: PEPS, Quebec City, Quebec
- Champions: Queen's Golden Gaels

CIS football seasons seasons
- 2008 2010

The 2009 CIS football season began on August 29, 2009, and concluded its campaign with the 45th Vanier Cup national championship on November 28 at PEPS stadium in Quebec City, Quebec. Twenty-seven universities across Canada compete in CIS football, the highest level of amateur play in Canadian football, under the auspices of Canadian Interuniversity Sport (CIS). The Queen's Golden Gaels defeated the Calgary Dinos 33-31 in the Vanier Cup to claim the 2009 national championship and their fourth in school history.

== Schedule ==
The regular-season schedule began early with a single Canada West Universities Athletic Association game in week one on Saturday, August 23, between the UBC Thunderbirds and the Simon Fraser Clan at Thunderbird Stadium in Greater Vancouver. The Ontario University Athletics, Quebec University Football League, and remaining CWUAA teams got underway the following week during the Labour Day weekend, and the Atlantic University Sport conference began their matches the week following that.

== Awards and records ==
=== Awards ===
- Hec Crighton Trophy – Erik Glavic, Calgary
- Presidents' Trophy – Cory Greenwood, Concordia
- Russ Jackson Award – Thomas Hall, Manitoba
- J. P. Metras Trophy – Matt Morencie, Windsor
- Peter Gorman Trophy – Linden Gaydosh, Calgary

=== All-Canadian Team ===
==== First Team ====
Offence
Erik Glavic, QB, Calgary
Pascal Fils, RB, Sherbrooke
Matt Walter, RB, Calgary
Nathan Coehoorn, WR, Calgary
Akeem Foster, WR, St. Francis Xavier
Gary Ross, IR, Mount Allison
Scott Valberg, IR, Queen's
Matt Morencie, C, Windsor
Matthew O'Donnell, OT, Queen's
David Bouchard, OT, Laval
Justin Glover, G, McMaster
Pascal Baillargeon, G, Laval
Defence
Jean-Philippe Gilbert, DT, Laval
Gregory Alexandre, DT, Montreal
Mathieu Brossard, DE, Montreal
Osie Ukwuoma, DE, Queen's
Cory Greenwood, LB, Corcordia
John Surla, LB, Western Ontario
Henoc Muamba, LB, St. Francis Xavier
Anthony DesLauriers, FS, Simon Fraser
Maxime Bérubé, HB, Laval
James Savoie, HB, Guelph
Olivier Turcotte-Létourneau, CB, Laval
Jim Allin, CB, Queen's
Special Teams
Hugh O'Neill, P, Alberta
Perri Scarcelli, K, Regina
Dillon Heap, RET, Wilfrid Laurier

==== Second Team ====
Offence
Michael Faulds, QB, Western Ontario
Nathan Riva, RB, Western Ontario
Nick FitzGibbon, RB, Guelph
Julian Feoli Gudino, WR, Laval
Cyril Adjeitey, WR, Ottawa
Anthony Parker, IR, Calgary
Cory Watson, IR, Concordia
Derek Weber, C, Saint Mary's
Kristian Matte, OT, Concordia
Kirby Fabien, OT, Calgary
Terriss Paliwoda, G, Alberta
Matthew Norman, G, Western Ontario
Defence
Sébastien Tétreault, DT, Ottawa
Eddie Steele, DT, Manitoba
Craig Gerbrandt, DE, Alberta
David Skillen, DE, St. Francis Xavier
Andrea Bonaventura, LB, Calgary
Tommy Lynch, LB, St. Francis Xavier
Giancarlo Rapanaro, LB, Wilfrid Laurier
Courtney Stephen, FS, Wilfrid Laurier
Mike Miller, HB, Acadia
Mark Holden, HB, Saint Mary's
Grant Shaw, CB, Saskatchewan
Dylan Hollohan, CB, St. Francis Xavier
Special Teams
Christopher Milo, P, Laval
Justin Palardy, K, Saint Mary's
Gary Ross, RET, Mount Allison

=== Records ===
As of October 1, 2009, three active CIS quarterbacks were climbing the top ten career passing records. Danny Brannagan of Queen's Golden Gaels was in fifth place for both all-time 9,236 career passing yards and 71 touchdowns. Michael Faulds of Western Mustangs was in sixth place just behind Brannagan with 9,137 career passing yards and Justin Dunk, of the Guelph Gryphons was seventh with 9,093 passing yards. In their rivalry game on October 17, 2009, both Brannagan and Faulds became only the second and third players, respectively, to pass for over 10,000 yards in their career. Faulds would eventually pass Brannagan and claim the title of All-Time Passing Leader, totaling 10,811 career yards, as well as the CIS single-season passing record with 3,033 yards. Brannagan would have to settle with second on the all-time list after a disappointing final game of the season left him with 10,714 for his career.

McGill wide receiver Charles-Antoine Sinotte was in eighth place on the career receptions list with 172 catches, and working towards reaching the record of 194 catches that former Redmen teammate Erik Galas set in the 2008 CIS football season.

Guelph kicker Rob Maver was in eighth place on the CIS all-time field goals list with 54.

Saskatchewan Huskies kicker Grant Shaw, kicked a 55-yard field goal on October 17 against Manitoba, to tie a Canada West record for longest field goal. It was two yards shy of the all-time CIS record of 57 yards.

== Results ==
=== Regular season standings ===
2009 Canada West standings
	Conf				Playoff Spot
Team (Rank)	W		L	PTS	Playoff Spot
#3 Saskatchewan	7	-	1	14	†
#2 Calgary	7	-	1	14	X
Alberta	4	-	4	8	X
Regina	3	-	5	6	X
UBC^{b}	3	-	5	6	
Manitoba^{c}	2	-	5	4	
Simon Fraser^{a}	1	-	6	2	
† – Conference Champion; Rankings: CIS Top 10 (Nov 3)^{a} - Forfeited 2 wins for ineligible player.^{b} - Awarded a win over Simon Fraser due to the Clan using an ineligible player.^{c} - Forfeited 3 wins for ineligible player.

2009 QUFL standings
	Overall				Conf			Playoff Spot
Team (Rank)	W		L	PTS	W		L	Playoff Spot
#1 Laval	7	-	1	14	6	-	1	†
#8 Montreal	5	-	3	10	4	-	3	X
Bishop's	4	-	4	8	3	-	4	X
Concordia	3	-	5	6	2	-	4	X
McGill	3	-	5	6	2	-	4	
Sherbrooke	3	-	5	6	3	-	4	
† – Conference Champion; Rankings: CIS Top 10 (Nov 3)

2009 OUA standings
Team (Rank)	W		L	PTS	Playoff Spot
#4 Queen's	7	-	1	14	†
#7 Laurier	6	-	2	12	X
#5 Western	6	-	2	12	X
Ottawa	6	-	2	12	X
#9 McMaster	6	-	2	12	X
Guelph	3	-	5	6	X
Waterloo	3	-	5	6	
Windsor	2	-	6	4	
Toronto	1	-	7	2	
York	0	-	8	0	
† – Conference Champion; Rankings: CIS Top 10 (Nov 3)

2009 AUS standings
	Overall				Conf			Playoff Spot
Team (Rank)	W		L	PTS	W		L	Playoff Spot
#6 Saint Mary's	7	-	1	14	5	-	1	†
#10 St. FX	6	-	2	12	5	-	1	X
Acadia	2	-	6	4	2	-	4	X
Mount Allison	0	-	8	0	0	-	6	
† – Conference Champion; Rankings: CIS Top 10 (Nov 3)

=== Top 10 ===
UFRC-CIS Top 10 Rankings
	01	02	03	04	05	06	07	08	09	10	11
Acadia Axemen	NR	NR	NR	15	NR	NR	NR	NR	NR	NR	NR
Alberta Golden Bears	NR	NR	NR	NR	13	11	16	14	NR	NR	NR
Bishop's Gaiters	16	NR	NR	NR	NR	NR	NR	NR	NR	15	12
Calgary Dinos	3	3	5	4	4	3	3	3	3	2	2
Concordia Stingers	6	6	9	13	NR	NR	NR	NR	NR	13	NR
Guelph Gryphons	18	16	15	12	10	10	9	13	13	NR	NR
Laurier Golden Hawks	7	7	6	8	8	8	12	12	11	8	7
Laval Rouge et Or	1	1	1	1	1	1	2	2	1	1	1
Manitoba Bisons	12	12	NR	NR	NR	NR	13	NR	NR	12	13
McGill Redmen	NR	NR	NR	16	NR	15	14	NR	NR	NR	NR
McMaster Marauders	17	15	14	16	NR	NR	10	10	10	10	9
Montreal Carabins	9	9	8	5	6	5	1	1	4	9	8
Mount Allison Mounties	19	NR	NR	NR	NR	NR	NR	NR	NR	NR	NR
Ottawa Gee-Gees	10	10	13	11	14	14	11	9	8	7	11
Queen's Golden Gaels	8	8	7	6	5	4	4	4	2	4	4
Regina Rams	15	17	11	10	15	12	15	11	NR	NR	NR
Saint Mary's Huskies	5	5	4	9	9	9	8	8	7	6	6
Saskatchewan Huskies	4	4	3	3	3	7	7	7	5	3	3
Sherbrooke Vert et Or	14	13	12	14	12	13	NR	NR	12	14	14
Simon Fraser Clan	11	11	10	NR	11	NR	17	NR	14	NR	NR
St. Francis Xavier X-Men	13	14	N	7	7	6	6	6	9	11	10
Toronto Varsity Blues	NR	NR	NR	NR	NR	NR	NR	NR	NR	NR	NR
UBC Thunderbirds	19	18	16	NR	NR	NR	NR	NR	NR	NR	NR
Waterloo Warriors	NR	NR	NR	NR	NR	NR	NR	NR	NR	NR	NR
Western Mustangs	2	2	2	2	2	2	5	5	6	5	5
Windsor Lancers	NR	NR	NR	NR	NR	NR	NR	NR	NR	NR	NR
York Lions	NR	NR	NR	NR	NR	NR	NR	NR	NR	NR	NR

Ranks in italics are teams not ranked in the top 10 poll but received votes. NR = Not ranked, received no votes.

=== Championships ===
The Vanier Cup is played between the champions of the Mitchell Bowl and the Uteck Bowl, the national semi-final games. In 2009, according to the rotating schedule, the Dunsmore Cup Quebec championship team will meet the Ontario conference's Yates Cup champion for the Mitchell Bowl. The winners of the Canada West conference Hardy Trophy travel to the Atlantic conference Loney Bowl champions for the Uteck Bowl.

The Canada West play-offs start with the top four placed teams from the regular season, with the top placed team hosting the fourth place and the second place team hosting the third placed. The winners of those semi-finals then compete for the Hardy Cup championship who then travels to the Atlantic champion for a national semi-final game.

The Quebec play-offs similarly play-off the top four placed teams with the Dunsmore Cup champions moving on to compete for the Mitchell Bowl against the Ontario champions.

The Ontario conference starts out with the top six placed teams from the regular season. The third placed team hosts the sixth place team and the fourth placed team host the team in fifth place. The winners then take on the top two placed teams in the conference semi-finals and the semi-final champions compete for the Yates Cup. The Ontario champions, in 2009, host the Quebec conference champions for the Mitchell Bowl national semi-final game.

The Atlantic conference play-offs the second and third placed teams to determine who plays the first place team at the Loney Bowl for the Jewett Trophy. The Atlantic winner then hosts the Canada West champion to meet in the Uteck Bowl national semi-final.

==== Playoff bracket ====
Conference Quarter-finals
Guelph Gryphons	18
Western Ontario Mustangs	37
McMaster Marauders	27
Ottawa Gee-Gees	15

Conference Semi-finals
Alberta Golden Bears	13
Calgary Dinos	45
Hardy Trophy
Regina Rams	23
Saskatchewan Huskies	53
Acadia Axemen	30
St. Francis Xavier X-Men	33
Loney Bowl
Bishop's Gaiters	15
Montreal Carabins	40
Dunsmore Cup
Concordia Stingers	1
Laval Rouge et Or	63
Western Ontario Mustangs	26
Laurier Golden Hawks	16
Yates Cup
McMaster Marauders	6
Queen's Golden Gaels	32

Conference Championships
Calgary Dinos	39
Saskatchewan Huskies	38
Uteck Bowl
St. Francis Xavier X-Men	22
Saint Mary's Huskies	31
Montreal Carabins	7
Laval Rouge et Or	31
Mitchell Bowl
Western Ontario Mustangs	39
Queen's Golden Gaels	43

National Semi-finals
Calgary Dinos	38
Saint Mary's Huskies	14
Laval Rouge et Or	30
Queen's Golden Gaels	33

45th Vanier Cup
Calgary Dinos	31
Queen's Golden Gaels	33
