= 2008 CIS football season =

- Duration: August 23, 2008 – October 25, 2008
- Hardy Cup champions: Calgary Dinos
- Yates Cup champions: Western Ontario Mustangs
- Dunsmore Cup champions: Laval Rouge et Or
- Loney Bowl champions: Saint Mary's Huskies
- Mitchell Bowl champions: Western Ontario Mustangs
- Uteck Bowl champions: Laval Rouge et Or

Vanier Cup
- Date: November 22, 2008
- Venue: Ivor Wynne Stadium, Hamilton
- Champions: Laval Rouge et Or

CIS football seasons seasons
- 2007 2009

The 2008 CIS football season began on August 23, 2008, and concluded with the 44th Vanier Cup national championship on November 22 at Ivor Wynne Stadium in Hamilton, Ontario, with the Laval Rouge et Or winning their fifth championship. Twenty-seven universities across Canada compete in CIS football, the highest level of amateur play in Canadian football, under the auspices of Canadian Interuniversity Sport (CIS).

== Schedule ==
The regular-season schedule began early with a single Canada West Universities Athletic Association game in week one on Saturday, August 23, between the UBC Thunderbirds and the Simon Fraser Clan at Swangard Stadium in Burnaby. The Ontario University Athletics and remaining CWUAA teams got underway the following week during the Labour Day weekend and the Quebec and Atlantic conferences beginning their matches the week following that.

The regular-season concluded in Week 10 on the weekend of October 24/25 for all but the Ontario conference, who had concluded the previous week and held their conference quarter-finals. All conferences held their semi-finals the weekend of November 1/2, and conference championships the weekend of November 8/9. This year, the National Semi-Finals took place on November 16. The Calgary Dinos, the Hardy Trophy-winning Canada West team travelled to Quebec City to take on the Dunsmore Cup winning Laval Rouge-et-Or of the Quebec conference for the Uteck Bowl and the Atlantic conference's Saint Mary's Huskies Jewett Trophy winners visited the Western Ontario Mustangs, Ontario's Yates Cup winners, in London for the Mitchell Bowl. Finally the Bowl winners, Laval and Western, met for the Vanier Cup national championship on Saturday, November 22, in Hamilton, the day before the Canadian Football League's 96th Grey Cup in Montreal. Laval won the game 44-21 and became the just the twelfth CIS team to finish a season undefeated.

2007 marked the first year that the Vanier Cup and Grey Cup were played on the same weekend but they both took place in Toronto's Rogers Centre as part of the 95th Grey Cup celebrations. Dating back to 1973, previous Vanier Cups had always been played the week following the Grey Cup.

== Awards and records ==
=== Awards ===
- Hec Crighton Trophy – Benoit Groulx, Laval
- Presidents' Trophy – Thaine Carter, Queen's
- Russ Jackson Award – David Hamilton, University of Toronto
- J. P. Metras Trophy – Étienne Légaré, Laval
- Peter Gorman Trophy – Jordan Verdone, Waterloo

=== All-Canadian Team ===
==== First Team ====
Offence
Benoit Groulx, QB, Laval
Michael Giffin, RB, Queen's
Jamall Lee, RB, Bishop's
Julian Feoli Gudino, WR, Laval
Scott Valberg, WR, Queen's
Erik Galas, IR, McGill
Gary Ross, IR, Mount Allison
Louis-David Gagne, C, Laval
Simeon Rottier, OT, Alberta
Steve Myddelton, OT, St. Francis Xavier
Vincent Turgeon, G, Laval
Luc Brodeur-Jourdain, G, Laval
Defence
Étienne Légaré, DT, Laval
Dedrick Sterling, DT, Queen's
Scott McCuaig, DE, British Columbia
Osie Ukwuoma, DE, Queen's
Thaine Carter, LB, Queen's
Andrea Bonaventura, LB, Calgary
Joash Gesse, LB, Montreal
Callan Exeter, FS, Mount Allison
Maxime Bérubé, DB, Laval
James Savoie, DB, Guelph
Hamid Mahmoudi, CB, Montreal
Jeff Zelinski, CB, Saint Mary's
Special Teams
Rob Maver, P, Guelph
Christopher Milo, K, Laval
Jim Allin, RET, Queen's

==== Second Team ====
Offence
Danny Brannagan, QB, Queen's
Matt Walter, RB, Calgary
James Green, RB, St. Francis Xavier
Jedd Gardner, WR, Guelph
Nathan Coehoorn, WR, Calgary
Mark Stinson, IR, Toronto
Alain Dorval, IR, Sherbrooke
Kurtis Stolth, C, Manitoba
Scott Evans, OT, Laurier
Bryan Jordan, OT, Saint Mary's
Hubert Buydens, G, Saskatchewan
Vincenzo De Civita, G, Queen's
Defence
Dan Schutte, DT, Saint Mary's
Don Oramasionwu, DT, Manitoba
Mathieu Brossard, DE, Montreal
Marc-Antoine Beaudoin-Cloutier, DE, Laval
John Surla, LB, Western
Henoc Muamba, LB, St. Francis Xavier
James Yurichuk, LB, Bishop's
Matthew Carapella, FS, Western
Corey McNair, DB, Western
Joel Lipinski, DB, Saint Mary's
Jon Krahenbil, CB, Saskatchewan
Anthony DesLauriers, CB, Simon Fraser
Special Teams
Hugh O'Neill, P, Alberta
Rob Maver, K, Guelph
Gary Ross, RET, Mount Allison

The Laval Rouge-et-Or had a record eight first team all-Canadians on offence, defence and special teams.

=== Career records ===
27 new top-ten achievements were added to the all-time career record books in 2008 including five new records as running back Daryl Stephenson completed his record career at Windsor and several passing/receiving records were set at McGill.

All-purpose touchdowns
Daryl Stephenson of Windsor completed his CIS career at eighth place all-time with 39 touchdowns.
Mike Giffin of Queen's is close behind tied for ninth with 37 but both are well behind Paul Brule's 1964–1967 record of 51.

Rushing yards
Daryl Stephenson set a new record of 5163 career rushing yards beating Dominic Zagari's 1991–1995 record of 4738.
Jamall Lee of Bishop's reached 4296 yards for fourth place all-time
Joseph Mroué set a mark of 3779 yards to take tenth place during his career at Montreal (2003–06) and Sherbrooke (2008).

Rushing touchdowns
Daryl Stephenson ended his career tied for sixth place with 36 rushing touchdowns behind Paul Brule's record of 49.
Jamall Lee reached eighth place with 35 rushing touchdowns so far since 2005.

Passing yards
Matt Connell of McGill set a new record of 10455 passing yards beating Ben Chapdelaine's 1997–2001 record of 9974.
Josh Sacobie of Ottawa ended up in third place overall with 9885 yards.
Teale Orban of Regina reached fourth place all-time with 9449.

Passing touchdowns
Josh Sacobie was unable to beat Chris Flynn's 1987–1990 all-time record of 87 but still managed to make second place with 79.
Teale Orban made third place with 76.
Matt Connell accomplished a tie for seventh overall with 63.
Dan Brannagan of Queen's tied the eighth overall mark of 62 passing touchdowns.

Passing attempts
Matt Connell set the new record of 1364 pass attempts as well in 2008 passing Greg Vavra's old record of 1200 set between 1979 and 1983.
Teale Orban finished just shy of second place with 1198.
Josh Sacobie made third place with 1111.

Passing completions

The passing completions record book was completely re-written in 2008 as three players beat Greg Vavra's 25-year-old record of 611.

Matt Connell finished in first place with 816 pass completions all-time.
Teale Orban made second place with 685.
Josh Sacobie's 637 completions puts him in third place overall.
Michael Faulds of Western makes it up to eighth place so far with 561 completions since 2005.

Receptions
Erik Galas of McGill helped with those pass completions by setting a new record of 194 receptions beating Andy Fantuz's mark of 189.
Chad Goldie was able to tie for sixth place all-time by catching 173 in his career at Regina.

Receiving touchdowns
Ivan Birungi finished his CIS career at second place all-time with 33 receiving touchdowns in his time split between Acadia and Ottawa missing Andy Fantuz's record of 41.
Scott Valberg of Queen's is tied for eighth with 23.

Interceptions
Matt Carapella of Western was able to steal a tie for second place in career interceptions with 21 missing Bob Coffin's 1970–1974 record of 24.

Field goals
Shawn McIsaac of UBC kicked up to fourth place in the career record book with 63 field goals behind all-time record holder Frank Jagas's 70 set between 1990 and 1994.

== Results ==
=== Regular season standings ===
Note: GP = Games Played, W = Wins, L = Losses, PF = Points For, PA = Points Against, Pts = Points

Canada West
Team	GP	W	L	PF	PA	Pts
**Saskatchewan**	8	6	2	217	83	12
**Calgary**	8	5	3	146	127	10
**Regina**	8	5	3	163	179	10
**Simon Fraser**	8	5	3	125	129	10
Manitoba	8	3	5	127	163	6
UBC	8	2	6	117	160	4
Alberta	8	2	6	140	194	4

Ontario
Team	GP	W	L	PF	PA	Pts
**Queen's**	8	8	0	374	116	16
**Western**	8	7	1	363	133	14
**Laurier**	8	6	2	235	191	12
**Guelph**	8	4	4	239	167	8
**Ottawa**	8	4	4	297	187	8
**McMaster**	8	4	4	230	198	8
Windsor	8	3	5	189	254	6
Toronto	8	2	6	168	272	4
Waterloo	8	2	6	147	285	4
York	8	0	8	32	471	0

Quebec
Team	GP	W	L	PF	PA	Pts
**Laval**	8	8	0	337	60	16
**Concordia**	8	5	3	228	180	10
**Sherbrooke**	8	5	3	190	153	10
**Montreal**	8	5	3	273	138	10
Bishop's	8	3	5	170	255	6
McGill	8	0	8	131	413	0

Atlantic
Team	GP	W	L	PF	PA	Pts
**Saint Mary's**	8	7	1	259	168	14
**StFX**	8	4	4	186	205	8
**Mount Allison**	8	2	6	189	272	4
Acadia	8	1	7	120	239	2

Teams in bold have earned playoff berths.

=== Top 10 ===
FRC-CIS Top 10 Rankings
	01	02	03	04	05	06	07	08	09
Acadia Axemen	NR	16	NR	NR	NR	NR	NR	NR	NR
Alberta Golden Bears	12	NR	NR	NR	NR	NR	NR	NR	NR
Bishop's Gaiters	10	12	NR	14	9	NR	NR	12	NR
Calgary Dinos	14	9	9	10	6	6	4	4	6
Concordia Stingers	9	7	7	9	8	7	5	9	9
Guelph Gryphons	NR	NR	NR	NR	NR	NR	NR	NR	NR
Laurier Golden Hawks	6	10	NR	NR	14	10	10	8	7
Laval Rouge et Or	1	1	1	1	1	1	1	1	1
Manitoba Bisons	2	8	NR	13	NR	NR	12	NR	NR
McGill Redmen	NR	NR	NR	NR	NR	NR	NR	NR	NR
McMaster Marauders	NR	NR	NR	NR	NR	NR	NR	NR	NR
Montreal Carabins	13	11	10	NR	12	12	11	10	10
Mount Allison Mounties	NR	NR	NR	NR	NR	NR	NR	NR	NR
Ottawa Gee-Gees	8	6	5	5	7	13	NR	NR	NR
Queen's Golden Gaels	7	5	4	4	2	2	2	2	2
Regina Rams	11	NR	13	NR	13	11	NR	NR	NR
Saint Mary's Huskies	3	3	3	3	3	3	7	6	5
Saskatchewan Huskies	4	2	6	6	4	4	6	5	4
Sherbrooke Vert et Or	NR	15	12	8	11	9	9	11	NR
Simon Fraser Clan	NR	NR	8	7	10	8	8	7	8
St. Francis Xavier X-Men	15	NR	NR	11	NR	NR	NR	NR	NR
Toronto Varsity Blues	NR	NR	NR	NR	NR	NR	NR	NR	NR
UBC Thunderbirds	NR	14	11	12	NR	NR	NR	NR	NR
Waterloo Warriors	NR	NR	NR	NR	NR	NR	NR	NR	NR
Western Mustangs	5	4	2	2	5	5	3	3	3
Windsor Lancers	NR	13	NR	NR	15	NR	NR	NR	NR
York Lions	NR	NR	NR	NR	NR	NR	NR	NR	NR

Ranks in italics are teams not ranked in the top 10 poll but received votes. NR = Not ranked, received no votes.

=== Championships ===
The Vanier Cup is played between the champions of the Mitchell Bowl and the Uteck Bowl, the national semi-final games. In 2008, according to the rotating schedule, the winners of the Atlantic conference Loney Bowl meet the Ontario conference's Yates Cup champion for the Mitchell Bowl. The winners of the Canada West conference Hardy Trophy travel to the Dunsmore Cup Quebec championship team for the Uteck Bowl.

The Canada West play-offs start with the top four placed teams from the regular season, with the top placed team hosting the fourth place and the second place team hosting the third placed. The winners of those semi-finals then compete for the Hardy Cup championship who then travels to the Quebec champion for a national semi-final game.

The Quebec play-offs similarly play-off the top four placed teams with the Dunsmore Cup champions moving on to host the Uteck Bowl against the Canada West champions.

The Ontario conference started out with the top six placed teams from the regular season. The third placed team hosted the sixth place team and the fourth placed team hosted the team in fifth place. The winners then took on the top two placed teams in the conference semi-finals and the semi-final champions compete for the Yates Cup. According to the rotating CIS Bowl schedule, the Ontario champions, in 2008, host the Atlantic conference champions for the Mitchell Bowl national semi-final game.

In the Atlantic conference play-offs, the second place St. Francis Xavier X-Men defeated the third placed Mount Allison Mounties to move on to face the first place Saint Mary's Huskies at the Loney Bowl for the Jewett Trophy. Saint Mary's victory means that they then travel to the Ontario champion Western Ontario Mustangs to meet in the Mitchell Bowl.

The 2008 Uteck Bowl saw the number one ranked Laval Rouge-et-Or dominate the sixth-ranked Calgary Dinos with a 59 to 10 win. With the win, Laval continues their streak of winning all four Bowl games played at PEPS Stadium and hope to continue their record of being undefeated in all four previous appearances at the Vanier Cup.

At home at TD Waterhouse Stadium, the number three ranked Western Ontario Mustangs defeated the number five ranked Saint Mary's Huskies to win the Mitchell Bowl with a score of 28 to 12. Western lost in the 2007 Mitchell Bowl to Manitoba Bisons and last won a Vanier Cup in 1994.

=== Vanier Cup ===
The 44th Vanier Cup marked Western's 12th appearance at the Vanier, the most by any team. They also hold the record for the number of Vanier Cup wins with 6. It was Laval's fifth appearance at the Vanier during their ten-year history, having won each of their previous appearances. 2008 also marked the first Vanier Cup game to feature both a Quebec university and an Ontario university. Laval won the game 44-21 and gained their fifth championship since 1999 to become the just the twelfth CIS team to finish a season undefeated.

Laval's victory completed their season without a single loss, the twelfth perfect season in Canadian university history, and puts them tied for second among Canadian universities with five Vanier Cups. Only Western has more with six national championships. It also marked Glen Constantin's fourth Vanier Cup victory as head coach, tying the record set by Calgary's Peter Connellan.

The attendance at Ivor Wynne was 13,873 with light snow and a temperature of −4 °C (25 °F). The attendance at the 2007 Vanier was 26,787 at the Roger's Centre during the 95th Grey Cup weekend. The 2006 Vanier Cup was sold-out with 12,567 in Saskatoon's Griffiths Stadium and the 2005 cup at Ivor Wynne had 16,827 spectators.

Though there were no bids by the deadline to host the 2009 Vanier Cup, Constantin said Laval does intend to do so. Canadian Interuniversity Sport intended to discuss the issue during its December 1–2 board meetings.

==== Scoring summary ====
Team	Q1	Q2	Q3	Q4	Total
Laval Rouge et Or	3	24	14	3	44
Western Ontario Mustangs	0	7	7	7	21

First Quarter
Lav - FG Milo 33 12:25

Second Quarter
Lav - FG Milo 27 3:18
Lav - TD Hernandez-Sanchez 2 run (Milo kick) 7:17
Lav - TD Feoli Gudino 74 punt return (Milo kick) 8:50
UWO - TD Trevail 14 pass from Faulds (Wheeler kick) 11:36
Lav - TD Feoli Gudino 82 pass from Groulx (Milo kick) 12:27

Third Quarter
Lav - TD Bouvette 92 pass from Groulx (Milo kick) 4:05
UWO - TD Bellamy 23 pass from Faulds (Wheeler kick) 6:58
Lav - TD Levesque 63 rush (Milo kick) 12:01

Fourth Quarter
UWO - TD Riva 9 pass from Faulds (Wheeler kick) 0:17
Lav - FG Milo 37 11:50

Notes

- Attendance: 13,873
- Ted Morris Memorial Trophy (Most Outstanding Player): Julian Feoli Gudino (Laval)
- Bruce Coulter Award (Most Outstanding Defensive Player): Marc-Antoine L. Fortin (Laval)
- QB Benoit Groulx is the fourth CIS player to win both the Hec Crighton Trophy and Vanier Cup in the same season.
- Western QB Michael Faulds set a Vanier record with 37 completions and his 65 attempts and 403 yards passing are a record in regulation time, beaten only by Brent Schneider of the Saskatchewan Huskies in overtime during the 1994 Vanier Cup.
- Western has both the most Vanier Cup appearances (12) and wins (6).

==== Playoff bracket ====
Conference Quarter-finals
**Ottawa Gee-Gees**	**42**
Guelph Gryphons	37
McMaster Marauders	0
**Laurier Golden Hawks**	**29**

Conference Semi-finals
**Simon Fraser Clan**	**40**
Saskatchewan Huskies	30
**Canada West**
Regina Rams	17
**Calgary Dinos**	**24**
Sherbrooke Vert-et-Or	20
**Concordia Stingers**	**41**
**Quebec**
Montreal Carabins	7
**Laval Rouge-et-Or**	**32**
Mount Allison Mounties	12
**St. Francis Xavier X-Men**	**52**
**Atlantic**
**Ottawa Gee-Gees**	**23**
Queen's Golden Gaels	13
**Ontario**
Laurier Golden Hawks	28
**Western Ontario Mustangs**	**36**

Conference Championships
Simon Fraser Clan	21
**Calgary Dinos**	**44**
Concordia Stingers	17
**Laval Rouge-et-Or**	**27**
St. Francis Xavier X-Men	27
**Saint Mary's Huskies**	**29**
Ottawa Gee-Gees	17
**Western Ontario Mustangs**	**31**

National Semi-finals
Calgary Dinos	10
**Laval Rouge-et-Or**	**59**
Saint Mary's Huskies	12
**Western Ontario Mustangs**	**28**

44th Vanier Cup
**Laval Rouge-et-Or**	**44**
Western Ontario Mustangs	21
