= 44th Vanier Cup =

2008 Canadian university football championship

Western Mustangs	Laval Rouge et Or
(7–1)	(8–0)
21	44
Head coach: Greg Marshall	Head coach: Glen Constantin
	1	2	3	4	Total
Western Mustangs	0	7	7	7	21
Laval Rouge et Or	3	24	14	3	44
- Date: November 22, 2008
- Stadium: Ivor Wynne Stadium
- Location: Hamilton
- Ted Morris Memorial Trophy: Julian Feoli Gudino, Laval WR
- Bruce Coulter Award: Marc-Antoine Fortin, Laval DL
- Attendance: 13,873

Broadcasters
- Network: The Score/The Score HD

The 44th Vanier Cup was played on November 22, 2008, at Ivor Wynne Stadium in Hamilton, Ontario, and decided the CIS Football champion for the 2008 season. The Laval Rouge et Or dominated the Western Mustangs to win the championship 44-21, en route to a perfect 12-0 season. The win gave Laval its fifth Vanier Cup in school history and its fourth in the last six years.

Laval receiver Julian Feoli Gudino was awarded the Ted Morris Memorial Trophy as the Most Valuable Player of the game after scoring a 74-yard punt return touchdown and an 82-yard touchdown reception. He finished the game with four receptions for 112 yards and three punt returns for 95 yards. Laval defensive lineman Marc-Antoine Fortin received the Bruce Coulter Award as the Most Outstanding Defensive Player of the game. Fortin had five solo tackles, three tackles for losses and one sack.

== Game summary ==
Western Mustangs (21) - TDs, Nick Trevail, Jesse Bellamy, Nathan Riva; cons., Darryl Wheeler (3).

Laval Rouge et Or (44) - TDs, Cesar-Roberto Hernandez-Sanchez, Julian Feoli Gudino (2), Mathieu Bouvette, Sébastien Lévesque; FGs Christopher Milo (3); cons., Christopher Milo (5).

=== Scoring summary ===
First Quarter
LAV - FG Milo 33 (12:25)

Second Quarter
LAV - FG Milo 27 (3:18)
LAV - TD Hernandez-Sanchez 2 run (Milo convert) (7:17)
LAV - TD Feoli Gudino 74 punt return (Milo convert) (8:50)
UWO - TD Trevail 14 pass from Faulds (Wheeler convert) (11:36)
LAV - TD Feoli Gudino 82 pass from Groulx (Milo convert) (12:27)

Third Quarter
LAV - TD Bouvette 92 pass from Groulx (Milo convert) (4:05)
UWO - TD Bellamy 23 pass from Faulds (Wheeler convert) (6:58)
LAV - TD Lévesque 63 rush (Milo kick) (12:01)

Fourth Quarter
UWO - TD Riva 9 pass from Faulds (Wheeler convert) (0:17)
LAV - FG Milo 37 (11:50)

The game started slowly at a snowy Ivor Wynne Stadium with only a 33-yard Laval field goal scored by kicker Christopher Milo in the first quarter. Milo scored another field goal at 3:18 of the second quarter and then Laval heated up with first a two-yard touchdown scored by a quarterback sneak by back-up Ceaser Hernandez-Sanchez and then, only a minute and half later, receiver Julian Feoli Gudino scored a 74-yard punt return touchdown, the third longest in Vanier history, to put the Rouge et Or up 20-0 midway through the second quarter. The Mustangs did respond quickly, however, when Ryan Tremblay returned the kickoff 62 yards, the longest kickoff return in Vanier history, and Western's possession ended with a 14-yard touchdown reception by Nick Trevail. Only 51 seconds later, that was nullified by Feoli Gudino again with an 82-yard pass reception from Laval QB Benoit Groulx, the fourth-longest TD catch in game history and the first half ended with Laval leading 27–7.

Laval continued in the third quarter with Mathieu Bouvette making a 92-yard touchdown reception, the longest ever in a Vanier Cup. Western responded with a 23-yard touchdown catch by Jesse Bellamy and Laval answered back with a 63 rushing touchdown by Sebastien Levesque making the score 41-14 at the end of the third quarter. Western scored a touchdown on a 9-yard pass to Nathan Riva to open the fourth quarter but that would be their final scoring play and Laval kicker Milo made the final score 44-21 with a field goal with just over three minutes left in the game.

=== Notable game facts ===
- Laval Rouge et Or became the 12th team in CIS history to claim the Vanier Cup after an undefeated season.
- Laval scored an impressive total of 4 TD of more than 60 yards during that game. The 92 yards TD pass from Groulx to Mathieu Bouvette was the longest in Vanier Cup history.
- Laval Quarterback Benoit Groulx became the fourth player in CIS history to win the Hec Crighton Trophy and Vanier Cup in the same season. Previous ones are Mark Nohra (UBC, 1997), Don Blair (Calgary, 1995) and Greg Vavra (Calgary, 1983).
- Mustangs kick returner Ryan Tremblay (London, Ont.), established single-game marks in kickoff returns (6), kickoff return yardage (204) and longest kickoff return (62 yards) in a Vanier Cup game.
- Mustang quarterback Michael Faulds completed 37 of 65 pass attempts for 403 yards, which ranked first all-time in Vanier Cup completions, and his attempts and yardage numbers are the highest in a regulation-length Vanier Cup.
- The Rouge & Or defence held the Mustangs to 30 net rush yards (0 in first half), establishing a new Vanier Cup record. They also tied the Vanier Cup record for most sacks with five.
- Western has the most Vanier Cup wins with six and Laval now has the second most Vanier Cup wins with five.
- With this title, Laval head coach Glen Constantin (2003, 2004, 2006, 2008) joined Peter Connellan (1983, 1985, 1988, 1995), former Calgary head coach, for the most Vanier Cup titles by a head coach with 4.

=== Championships ===
The Vanier Cup is played between the champions of the Mitchell Bowl and the Uteck Bowl, the national semi-final games. In 2008, according to the rotating schedule, the winners of the Atlantic conference Loney Bowl meet the Ontario conference's Yates Cup champion for the Mitchell Bowl. The winners of the Canada West conference Hardy Trophy travel to the Dunsmore Cup Quebec championship team for the Uteck Bowl.

The Canada West play-offs start with the top four placed teams from the regular season, with the top placed team hosting the fourth place and the second place team hosting the third placed. The winners of those semi-finals then compete for the Hardy Cup championship who then travels to the Quebec champion for a national semi-final game.

The Quebec play-offs similarly play-off the top four placed teams with the Dunsmore Cup champions moving on to host the Uteck Bowl against the Canada West champions.

The Ontario conference started out with the top six placed teams from the regular season. The third placed team hosted the sixth place team and the fourth placed team hosted the team in fifth place. The winners then took on the top two placed teams in the conference semi-finals and the semi-final champions compete for the Yates Cup. According to the rotating CIS Bowl schedule, the Ontario champions, in 2008, host the Atlantic conference champions for the Mitchell Bowl national semi-final game.

In the Atlantic conference play-offs, the second place St. Francis Xavier X-Men defeated the third placed Mount Allison Mounties to move on to face the first place Saint Mary's Huskies at the Loney Bowl for the Jewett Trophy. Saint Mary's victory means that they then travel to the Ontario champion Western Mustangs to meet in the Mitchell Bowl.

The 2008 Uteck Bowl saw the number one ranked Laval Rouge-et-Or dominate the sixth-ranked Calgary Dinos with a 59 to 10 win, and quarterback Benoit Groulx was named the game MVP. With the win, Laval continues their streak of winning all four Bowl games played at PEPS Stadium and hope to continue their record of being undefeated in all four previous appearances at the Vanier Cup.

At home at TD Waterhouse Stadium, the number three ranked Western Mustangs defeated the number five ranked Saint Mary's Huskies to win the Mitchell Bowl with a score of 28 to 12. Western lost in the 2007 Mitchell Bowl to Manitoba Bisons and last won a Vanier Cup in 1994.

==== 2008 Playoff bracket ====
Conference Quarter-finals
Ottawa Gee-Gees	42
Guelph Gryphons	37
McMaster Marauders	0
Laurier Golden Hawks	29

Conference Semi-finals
Simon Fraser Clan	40
Saskatchewan Huskies	30
Regina Rams	17
Calgary Dinos	24
Sherbrooke Vert-et-Or	20
Concordia Stingers	41
Montreal Carabins	7
Laval Rouge-et-Or	32
Mount Allison Mounties	12
St. Francis Xavier X-Men	52
Ottawa Gee-Gees	23
Queen's Golden Gaels	13
Laurier Golden Hawks	28
Western Mustangs	36

Conference Championships
Simon Fraser Clan	21
Calgary Dinos	44
Concordia Stingers	17
Laval Rouge-et-Or	27
St. Francis Xavier X-Men	27
Saint Mary's Huskies	29
Ottawa Gee-Gees	17
Western Mustangs	31

National Semi-finals
Calgary Dinos	10
Laval Rouge-et-Or	59
Saint Mary's Huskies	12
Western Mustangs	28

44th Vanier Cup
Laval Rouge-et-Or	44
Western Mustangs	21
