= Rodrigo Pérez =

Rodrigo Pérez may refer to:

- Rodrigo Pérez (footballer, born 1973), Chilean footballer
- Rodrigo Pérez (American football), Mexican gridiron football coach and former player
- Rodrigo Pérez (footballer, born 2003), Uruguayan footballer
- Rodrigo Pérez-Alonso González, Mexican politician
- Rodrigo Pérez de Traba, Galician medieval nobleman
- Rodrigo Pérez Mackenna, Chilean politician
