= Erik Glavic =

Profile
- Position: Quarterback

Personal information
- Born: Pickering, Ontario, Canada
- Listed height: 6 ft 6 in (1.98 m)
- Listed weight: 225 lb (102 kg)

Career information
- High school: St. Mary
- University: Saint Mary's / Calgary

Career history
- 2005–2008: Saint Mary's Huskies
- 2009–2010: Calgary Dinos

Awards and highlights
- Lois and Doug Mitchell Award (2010); 2× Hec Crighton Trophy (2007, 2009); AUS MVP (2007)

Erik Glavic is a Canadian former football quarterback who played CIS football for both the Calgary Dinos and the Saint Mary's Huskies. Glavic is the only CIS football player to have won the Hec Crighton Trophy with two different teams. His brother Sasha Glavic is a former defensive back for the Hamilton Tiger-Cats of the Canadian Football League (CFL).

== University career ==
Glavic was named starting quarterback in his third season with the Huskies, after being used the previous year mainly for short yardage situations. Glavic had a great year with 1,843 passing yards, and 478 rushing yards. Glavic's main asset is his ability to scramble as he added 5 rushing touchdowns to his 16 passing. In the 2007 Uteck Bowl Glavic passed for 102 yards and one touchdown, while adding 41 yards and one touchdown rushing. Glavic left the game early with an injured knee. The Huskies won the game and advanced to the national championship. Glavic found out later he would miss the Vanier Cup with an ACL tear. The Huskies would lose the championship 28-14. Glavic would nonetheless be named the Hec Crighton Award winner for 2007 as the CIS football MVP.

Glavic was poised to be the starter for the 2008 season after a Hec Crighton Award winning season, however Glavic struggled to rehabilitate his knee. He ended up only playing a portion of a single game the entire season.

In January, it was announced that Glavic was transferring to the University of Calgary to begin classes immediately and play for the Calgary Dinos in the 2009 season. After leading his team to a 7-1 record, Glavic enjoyed an outstanding season, completing 67.5 percent of his passes for 2,185 yards and 14 touchdowns. He also added 503 rushing yards and six rushing touchdowns, good for fourth in the conference. After defeating the Saskatchewan Huskies to win the Hardy Trophy, the Dinos beat the Saint Mary's Huskies 38-14 in the Uteck Bowl to earn the right to play in the Vanier Cup game. Glavic won the Hec Crighton Trophy for the second time in his career and became the first player to win the award with two different teams. Glavic and the Dinos would go on to lose the Vanier Cup game 33-31 to the Danny Brannagan-led Queen's Golden Gaels.

== Professional career ==
Glavic was one of three CIS quarterbacks to be invited to the Canadian Football League's 2010 Evaluation Camp, even though his draft eligibility year was the year before. Shortly after, Glavic was added to the Hamilton Tiger-Cats' negotiation list in anticipation of a rule change where Canadian quarterbacks do not count as a roster spot in training camp.

== Career statistics ==
			Passing							Rushing
Season	Team	League	GP	Comp	Att	Pct	Yds	TD	INT	Att	Yds	TD
2005	SMU	CIS	2	4	5	66.7	70	1	0	2	0	0
2006	SMU	CIS	7	37	68	54.4	525	1	1	33	270	3
2007	SMU	CIS	8	128	200	64.0	1843	16	5	62	478	5
2008	SMU	CIS	1	2	7	28.6	25	1	0	0	0	0
2009	CGY	CIS	8	129	191	67.5	2186	14	6	48	503	6
2010	CGY	CIS	5	46	88	52.3	691	2	2	9	70	1
2005-2010	Career	CIS	31	346	559	61.9	5340	35	15	154	1321	15
