= Pollari =

Pollari is a Finnish and Italian surname. It may refer to:

- Joey Pollari (born 1994), American actor
- Zachary Pollari (born 1986), Canadian football player
- Pat Pollari, pseudonym of K. A. Applegate (born 1956), American author
- Nicolò Pollari (born 1943), Italian general
