= Marc Fortin =

Marc Fortin may refer to:

- Marc-Antoine Fortin (born 1987), Canadian football player
- Marc-Aurèle Fortin (1888–1970), Québécois painter

== See also ==
- M. A. Fortin (born 1978), Canadian screenwriter
