= Benoit Groulx =

Benoit Groulx may refer to:

- Benoit Groulx (Canadian football) (born 1985), Canadian football quarterback
- Benoit Groulx (ice hockey) (born 1968), Canadian ice hockey player and coach

== See also ==
- Benoit-Olivier Groulx, Canadian professional ice hockey player
