= Danny Brannagan =

Canadian football player (born 1986)

Profile
- Position: Quarterback

Personal information
- Born: July 4, 1986 (age 40); Burlington, Ontario, Canada
- Listed height: 6 ft 0 in (1.83 m)
- Listed weight: 198 lb (90 kg)

Career information
- High school: Assumption
- College: Queen's University
- CFL draft: 2009: undrafted

Career history
- 2010: Toronto Argonauts

Awards and highlights
- 2009 Vanier Cup champion; OUA Rookie of the Year (2005); 2008 CIS All-Canadian (Second team); Queen’s All-Time Leading Passer (10,714 yards); CIS Football's Second All-Time Leading Passer (10,714 yards); CIS Football's Third All-Time Leading Touchdown Passer (77 TD's); MVP of 2009 Yates Cup; MVP of 2009 Vanier Cup
- Stats at CFL.ca (archive)

Danny Brannagan (born July 4, 1986) is a Canadian former professional football quarterback for the Toronto Argonauts of the Canadian Football League.

== Early life ==
Brannagan attended high school at Assumption Catholic Secondary School in Burlington where in his 5th and final year in 2004, he led the Assumption Crusaders to the GHAC finals where they defeated St. Jean de Brebeuf in a thriller, with the final score 29–28. Trailing by 27 points with less than 8 minutes to play, Brannagan led Assumption's offense to an amazing comeback, taking the lead with under 2 minutes left to play.

== College career ==
=== 2005 ===
Brannagan began his university football career with the Queen's Golden Gaels in 2005 and quickly assumed the starting quarterback position. In a game against Wilfrid Laurier, he came off the bench in the fourth quarter and threw for 110 yards, earning the start the following week against York University. He threw for 341 yards in the team's win and never looked back, starting the final seven games of the season. He was named the OUA Rookie of the Year for the 2005 season after completing 115 passes out of 209 attempts for 1,860 yards to go along with 12 touchdowns and 10 interceptions.

=== 2006-2007 ===
In 2006, Brannagan started all ten games for Queen's (including two playoff games), leading the team to a 4–4 record. He finished the season ranked third in the OUA with 1,744 passing yards and threw for 11 touchdowns and 11 interceptions. In 2007, Brannagan started eight regular season games and one playoff game, as the team finished with a 6–2 record. He showed great improvement this season, passing for 2,123 yards for 15 touchdowns and only six interceptions. He also played in the CIS East/West Bowl in Hamilton that year.

=== 2008 ===
Brannagan continued to improve for the 2008 season, as he completed 144 of 255 passes for 2,407 yards for a nation-leading 24 touchdowns and 10 interceptions. In a week six win versus the University of Ottawa, he passed Tommy Denison as Queen's all-time leading passer. He again started all eight regular season games compiling an undefeated record of 8-0 and first seed in the OUA playoffs. However, the Golden Gaels were defeated by the underdog Ottawa Gee-Gees in the second round of the playoffs. For his outstanding play, Brannagan was named to the CIS All-Canadian Second Team.

=== 2009 ===
While the team suffered their first loss in the last regular season game of 2009, it was the last time Brannagan lost a CIS football game. Brannagan started seven games in 2009, en route to the Golden Gaels' 7–1 regular season finish. During the season, he became only the third CIS quarterback to throw for over 10,000 yards in a career, and finished second all-time behind Michael Faulds with 10,714 yards. He threw for career bests of 2,580 yards and a 62.14% completion percentage to go along with 15 touchdowns and just seven interceptions. In the post-season, Brannagan was named Yates Cup MVP after recording a 43–39 win over Michael Faulds and the Western Ontario Mustangs. He capped off his outstanding collegiate career with a 33–31 win over the Calgary Dinos in the Vanier Cup where he was again named MVP for the game.

Heading into the final week of the 2009 regular season and despite having already missed a game due to injury, Brannagan led Western quarterback Michael Faulds by 164 career passing yards, and sat just 30 yards short of the all-time CIS record of 10,455 yards which was set just one season earlier by former McGill quarterback Matt Connell. However, Brannagan had a mediocre Week 8, completing 25 of 45 attempts for 289 yards and no touchdowns, while Faulds threw for an impressive 550 yards against the University of Toronto. Brannagan subsequently finished second on the all-time list with 10,714 yards, having been surpassed by Faulds, who finished with the record of 10,811 yards.

== Professional career ==
After impressing at the 2010 CFL E-Camp, Brannagan was signed by the Toronto Argonauts the day after the camp ended, on March 15, 2010, to a three-year contract. He was named to Toronto's practice roster on June 23, 2010. On November 7, 2010, Brannagan made his pro-football debut at quarterback for the Argonauts against the Montreal Alouettes and became the first Canadian quarterback to take a snap for the Argos since Frank Cosentino in 1969. He, also, became the first Canadian quarterback to take a snap in the Canadian Football League since Alouettes' quarterback, Larry Jusdanis in 1997. Despite making his CFL debut at the end of the 2010 season, Brannagan was released by the Argonauts on June 25, 2011.
