= Waterloo Warriors men's basketball =

- University: University of Waterloo
- First season: 1957
- Head coach: Troy Stevenson (3rd season)
- Location: Waterloo, Ontario
- Arena: Carl Totzke Court (capacity: 5000)
- Conference: OUA; West Division
- Nickname: Warriors
- Colors: Black and Gold

U Sports tournament champions
- 1975

U Sports tournament appearances
- 1974, 1975, 1976, 1977, 1981, 1983, 1984, 1985, 1986, 1998, 2005

Conference tournament champions
- 1974, 1975, 1976, 1977, 1983, 1986

Uniforms
Home	Away

The Waterloo Warriors men's basketball team represents the University of Waterloo in the Ontario University Athletics (OUA) of U Sports men's basketball. The Warriors have won the Wilson Cup, awarded to the OUA champions, 6 times: from 1974 to 1977, in 1983 and most recently in 1986. In addition, they have been awarded the W. P. McGee Trophy national championship trophy once, in 1975.

== History ==
The Warrior's basketball program was founded shortly after the university's inception in 1957 and has participated in every season since. Below is the team's regular season record since the 1999–2000 season.

=== Season-by-season Record ===
Season	W	L	PF	PA	Finish
1999-00	4	10	885	972	6th, OUA West
2000-01	4	10	1030	1097	5th, OUA West
2001-02	6	16	1462	1657	8th, OUA West
2002-03	10	12	1612	1616	6th, OUA West
2003-04	13	9	1528	1502	4th, OUA West
2004-05	19	3	1579	1425	2nd, OUA West
2005-06	13	9	1641	1600	4th, OUA West
2006-07	7	15	1415	1549	7th, OUA West
2007-08	6	16	1529	1684	8th, OUA West
2008-09	10	12	1547	1581	5th, OUA West
2009-10	9	13	1536	1537	6th, OUA West
2010-11	9	13	1749	1803	8th, OUA West
2011-12	6	16	1690	1925	8th, OUA West
2012-13	6	15	1374	1620	6th, OUA West
2013-14	5	17	1542	1759	7th, OUA West
2014-15	6	14	1348	1587	4th, OUA West
2015-16	1	19	1380	1747	5th, OUA West
2016-17	6	14	1455	1578	4th, OUA West
2017-18	8	16	1883	2057	6th, OUA West
2018-19	3	21	1779	2112	9th, OUA West
2019-20	5	17	1601	1853	5th, OUA West
2020-21	Cancelled Due to COVID-19				
2021-22	4	10	1041	1107	8th, OUA West

== Rivalries ==
The team, like all other sports teams at the university, have a rivalry with the nearby Wilfrid Laurier Golden Hawks, also located in Waterloo. They are both located on University Avenue within just over 1 kilometre of each other. The matchup between the two teams in any varsity sport is often titled and advertised as "The Battle of Waterloo", in reference to the 17th century Battle of Waterloo. Since 2011, the men's basketball teams have gone head-to-head a total of 22 times, with the Warriors winning 4 times and the Golden Hawks winning 18 times.
