= DeWayne Lewis =

American football player (born 1985)

No. 25
- Position: Cornerback

Personal information
- Born: October 4, 1985 (age 41); Lubbock, Texas, U.S.
- Listed height: 6 ft 0 in (1.83 m)
- Listed weight: 198 lb (90 kg)

Career information
- High school: Thomas Jefferson (Denver, Colorado)
- College: Southern Utah University; Michigan State

Awards and highlights
- USA Men's USA All World Defensive Back (2011); First-team All-World Defensive Back, 2011 IFAF World Championship; Best Defensive Back Award, 2011 IFAF World Championship

DeWayne Lewis
Medal record

Men's American football

Representing United States

World Championship
Gold medal – first place	2011 Austria	Team competition

DeWayne Lewis (born October 4, 1985) is an American former football cornerback.

While attending high school, Lewis won the Colorado state championship in both the 100-meter and 200-meter sprints three consecutive years. He played college football at Michigan State University for 3 years under coach John L. Smith and ran track and field. Lewis was all Big Ten in track and field posting some of Big Ten fastest 60 meter dash times. Lewis received an art degree before transferring to Southern Utah University (SUU). He advanced to the NCAA Track and Field Championships in 2009, won nine conference NCAA championships twice in the 100-meter sprint, and four times broke the school record in the 60-meter dash and 100-meter dash. He was selected by USA Football to play for the 2011 United States national American football team. He helped lead Team USA to the gold medal at the 2011 IFAF World Championship in Austria and was selected as an All-World defensive back and received the award as the Best Defensive Back at the World Championship.

== Early life ==
Lewis attended Thomas Jefferson High School in Denver, Colorado, where he led his team to the quarterfinal stage of the 2001 Colorado playoffs and to the semifinals in 2002. Lewis was also the fastest sprinter in the State of Colorado, winning the state championship in both the 100-meters and 200-meters three straight years. In his senior year, Lewis was the state champion in three events. The Denver Post wrote at the time: "The day before his graduation Lewis became the fastest young man in Colorado. Three times over. Lewis, a speed horse, won a breathtaking Triple Crown on Saturday."

== College career ==
=== Michigan State ===
In college, Lewis continued to compete in both football and track. He competed in track at Michigan State University, running the 60-meter event in 6.87 seconds in February 2006, and winning the event at the 2006 Kangaroo Invitational. Lewis also participated in Michigan State's spring football practice in 2005, but did not play in the regular season due to a shoulder injury.

In the fall of 2007, Lewis transferred to Southern Utah University (SUU). Michigan State head football coach John L. Smith said at the time that he liked Lewis's speed and wanted him to return, but Lewis sought a transfer to be closer to his mother. Smith contacted SUU's defensive coordinator Cole Wilson, who recruited Lewis to SUU.

=== Southern Utah ===
At SUU, Lewis competed in both football and track. He played football at SUU for three years (2006–2008), appearing in 32 games, including 28 games as a starter. He finished his college football career with 199 tackles and six interceptions.

In the fall of 2007, Lewis played in 10 games at cornerback, seven as a starter. In 2008, he totaled 51 tackles, four interceptions, and 13 pass break-ups, and was named the Great West Conference Player of the Week after playing Montana State. After Lewis's performance against Montana State, SUU defensive coordinator Cole Wilson said: "He's got the right frame of mind. It's Division I football here. You can make it big-time wherever you are."

As a senior, he played in the 2009 East Coast Bowl All-Star Game, an all-star game featuring players from smaller colleges and universities, where he had several pass break ups during the game. He also ran a 4.26 40-yard sprint at BYU's pro day.

Lewis also competed in track at Southern Utah. He was a seven-time Mid-Continent Conference/The Summit League 100-meter champion while attending SUU. His sprinting career suffered a setback when he dislocated his shoulder at SUU's spring football game in April 2008. Lewis recalled the injury: "It was like a dagger. I felt like it was over for me, both track and football. But I stayed focused and keep the drive and determination and came back." One month after the injury, Lewis qualified for the NCAA West Regional with a time of 10.61 seconds at the Mid-Continent Conference Championships. At the West Regional, Lewis qualified to advance to the NCAA Track and Field Championships with a time of 10.40 seconds. Lewis recalled his participation in the NCAA Track and Field Championship: "That was a great experience. It doesn't get any higher than that: To get a chance to face those guys at the top of the collegiate level."

Lewis also twice broke Southern Utah's 60-meter dash record, with times of 6.88 in 2007 and 6.72 in 2008. He was named the conference's athlete of the week four times. In February 2009, Lewis was named one of the top 50 sprinters in the country. He was also named SUU's Male Athlete of the Year in April 2008.

== Professional football ==
Lewis had tryouts with multiple NFL teams but did not sign a contract.

== 2011 IFAF World Championship ==
In June 2011, Lewis was selected by USA Football to play for the 2011 United States national American football team at the 2011 IFAF World Championship in Austria. With 13 tackles, three tackles for loss, two blocked punts, one interception, and three pass breakups in four games, Lewis helped lead Team USA to the gold medal at the 2011 World Championship. He was selected as a first-team All-World defensive back and received the award as the Best Defensive Back at the 2011 World Championship.
