= 2011 IFAF World Championship =

American football tournament

Tournament details
- Host nation: Austria
- Dates: July 8 – July 16
- No. of nations: 8

Final positions
- Champions: United States (2nd title)
- Runner-up: Canada
- Third-place: Japan

Tournament statistics
- Attendance: 20,000
- MVP of the tournament: (United States) Nate Kmic

The 2011 IFAF World Championship was the fourth instance of the IFAF World Championship, an international American football tournament. It began on July 8, 2011 with the final games commencing on July 16. It was hosted by Austria, with games taking place in three cities: Vienna, Innsbruck and Graz; Vienna hosted the medal games.

Austria won the bid to host the games. There were a record number of attendees at the 2009 IFAF Congress, the meeting which decided the host nation. The format was changed for 2011: for the first time, eight qualifying teams were divided into two groups, with the group winners competing for the Championship. Four teams automatically qualified: Austria (as host nation), the United States (as the defending World Champions), and Germany and France (for reaching the final in the 2010 EFAF European Championship. Four other teams were accepted through qualifiers in the four regions of the International Federation of American Football: Asia, Europe, Oceania and Pan-America.

The United States and Canada at the top place in Group A and Group B, respectively, played each other in the gold medal match on July 16, 2011.

In front of the largest crowd to ever watch a World Championship game (20,000), the United States won second title, after beat Canada, 50–7 in final.

== Qualifying ==
=== List of qualified teams ===
The following 8 teams qualified for the final tournament:

EFAF (3)

- Austria - qualify automatically as host nation.
- Germany - qualify as a result of reaching the final of the 2010 EFAF European Championship.
- France - qualify as a result of reaching the final of the 2010 EFAF European Championship.

PAFAF (3)

- United States - qualify automatically as current champions through winning the 2007 IFAF World Cup.
- Canada
- Mexico

AFAF (1)

- Japan - qualified after defeating South Korea in a qualifying match in February 2011 (76–0).

OFAF (1)

- Australia

== Venues ==
Below is a list of the venues which hosted games during the 2011 IFAF World Championship. Each preliminary round group was hosted in a single arena in Innsbruck (Group A) and Graz (Group B). The knockout phase and Finals took place at Ernst-Happel-Stadion in Vienna.

Preliminary round		Knockout stage
Innsbruck	Graz	Vienna
Tivoli-Neu; Capacity: 17,400	UPC-Arena; Capacity: 15,400	Ernst-Happel-Stadion; Capacity: 53,008

== Rosters ==
=== Australia ===
Australia National Football Team 2011 World Cup roster
Quarterbacks: 11 Kiernan Dorney; 14 David Ward; Running backs: 33 Matthew Croasdaile; 21 Luke Jackson; 37 Nathan Lansdell FB; 35 Paul Mason FB; Wide receivers: 84 Tristan Cauhepe; 89 Ryan Dwyer; 17 Liam Erby TE/K; 83 Luke Fredericks WR/P; 36 Tyson Garnham; 34 Locklan Gilbert TE/K; 26 Lewis Wyten	Offensive linemen: 60 Aaron Carbury OL; 58 Ernest Christensen OL; 72 James Gifford OL; 70 Adam Gotsis OL; 74 Dom Radman OL; 56 John Radman OL; 76 Kurt Schulte-Schrepping OL; 71 Jon Tostovin OL; Defensive linemen: 91 Chris Bondin DL; 84 Nathan Brown DL; 75 Kelvin Howsan DL; 55 Leon Latulipe DL; 50 Shannon Lynch DL; 69 Christian O'Dea DL; 90 John Tolsher DL	Linebackers: 80 Bradley Bennett; 27 James McFadzean; 24 Ryan Ottens; 51 Layke Rossiello; 9 Daniel Sharp; 13 Warren Zirkler; Defensive backs: 1 Steve Baker DB/P; 22 Damien Donaldson DB; 18 Kieran Lansdell DB; 2 Tautinoga Masaga Faletaogo DB; 8 Christian McCarty DB; 43 Ben Middleton DB; 88 Bryn Nightingale DB; 25 Chris Pearce DB; 47 Scott Wolfe DB; 28 Andrew Yeung DB; Special teams: None; Roster updated 2011-07-08

=== Austria ===
Austria National Football 2011 World Cup Team roster
Quarterbacks: 8 Christoph Gross; 13 Thomas Haider; Running backs: 31 Harald Egger; 26 Florian Grein; 23 Florian Hiess; 20 Mario Nerad; Wide receivers: 5 Thimothee Bach; 1 Jakob Dieplinger; 11 Maximilian Herdey; 80 Wolfrum Hofbauer; 17 Stefan Holzinger; 15 Armando Ponce de Leon; 88 Andreas Pröller; 18 Daniel Stanzel	Offensive linemen: 67 Norbert Baumberger OL; 61 Robert Dragotinits OL; 79 Valentin Gruber OL; 70 Michael Habetin OL; 66 Bernd Leitsoni OL; 75 Alexander Milanovic OL; 60 Michael Pribyl OL; 78 Thomas Tippold OL; Defensive linemen: 94 Florian Grünsteidl DL; 99 Johannes Kain DL; 71 Michael Kühnmeyer DL; 89 Roman Meklau DL; 92 Armin Novidi DL; 50 Mario Rinner DL; 90 Alexander Tahiri DL	Linebackers: 49 Simon Blach; 56 Alexander Cucek; 54 Andreas Düringer; 58 Florian Hueter; 47 Dustin Illetschko; 55 Christoph Schilcher; 32 Michael Suess; 10 Philip Stojaspal; Defensive backs: 4 Daniel Auböck DB; 21 Markus Krause DB; 7 Johannes Neusser DB; 30 Christof Promitzer DB; 28 Christoph Putz DB; 24 Manuel Schneeweiss DB; 42 Christoph Schreiner DB; 9 Peter Tutsh DB; Special teams: 2 Peter Kramberger K/P; Roster updated 2011-07-11

=== Canada ===
Canada National Football 2011 World Cup Team roster
Quarterbacks: 3 Michael Faulds; 10 Donnie Marshall; 15 Josh Sacobie; Running backs: 34 Nick FitzGibbon; 39 Michel-Pierre Pontbriand FB; 35 David Stevens; 33 Matt Walter; Wide receivers: 84 Shamawd Chambers; 1 Ricky Clarke; 82 Jedd Gardner; 18 Dante Luciani; 80 Jahmeek Murray WR/RB; 11 Alexandre Poirer; 86 Scott Valberg; 12 Stefon Jackman	Offensive linemen: 68 Reed Alexander OL; 62 Dan Bederman OL; 65 Josh Buttrill OL; 64 Justin Glover OL; 60 Sherko Haji-Rasouli OL; 77 Jason Medeiros OL; 61 Matt Norman OL; 66 Zachary Pollari OL; Defensive linemen: 90 Adriano Belli DL; 93 Brian Guebert DL; 99 Michaël Jean-Louis DL; 98 David Rybinski DL; 96 Josh Symons DT; 95 Jake Thomas DT/LB	Linebackers: 55 Peter Carrière LB; 52 Thaine Carter MLB; 51 Alex Deprato LB/DB; 50 Steve Faoro LB/LS; 59 Christian Houle LB; 53 Tom Labenski LB; 54 Anthony Maggiacomo LB; Defensive backs: 21 Troy Adams DB; 28 Maxim Bérubé DB; 24 Matt Carapella DB; 29 Shane Hall CB; 49 Julien Hamel DB; 22 Alexander Hoad CB; 25 Joel Lipinski DB; 23 Bryce McCall DB; 20 Sammy Okpro HB/SAM/FS; Special teams: 5 Lirim Hajrullahu K/P	Inactive List: -- Anthony Woodson RB; Roster updated 2011-07-09

=== France ===
France National Football 2011 World Cup Team roster
Quarterbacks: 1 Paul Bresaz-Latille; 12 Paul Durand; 13 Max Sprauel; Running backs: 22 Dimitri Kiernan; 28 Laurent Marceline; 23 Sandrino Octobre; 34 Sebastien Torel; Wide receivers: 8 Anthony Dable; 4 Steve Delaval; 47 Cesar Hebel; 24 Jérémy Larroque; 81 Bounouar Mellak; 19 Artchill Monney; 18 Jeremy Rabot	Offensive linemen: 79 Olivier Bordin OL; 76 Djadji Daffe OL; 62 Fabien Ducousso OL; 74 Jean-Philippe Eldin OL; 77 Rémi Fournier OL; 73 Tony Niel OL; 75 Bastien Pereira OL; 78 Guillaume Saliah OL; 53 Alexis Stropiano OL; Defensive linemen: 91 Mehdi Bekheira DL; 66 Fatih Caliskan DL; 98 Thibault Capitane DL; 51 Anthony Cheron DL; 56 Franzy Dorlean DL; 90 David Larochelle DL	Linebackers: 42 Cédric Cotar; 48 Kevin Demichelis; 44 Thomas Mimouni; 45 Giovanni Nanguy; 52 Nicolas Prevost; 40 Samuel Rafaillac; 5 Julien Zuppardi; Defensive backs: 6 Steve Berton DB; 21 Kewin Bordas DB; 2 Florent Cajazzo DB; 9 Nuno Dos Santos DB; 7 Aurélien Fourgeaud DB; 26 Alexandre Marquignon DB; 25 Tony Rayapin DB; 3 Arnaud Vidaller DB; Special teams: 15 Bruno Nekili K/P; Roster updated 2011-07-08

=== Germany ===
Germany National Football 2011 World Cup Team roster
Quarterbacks: 19 Gary Lautenschlager; 12 Joachim Ullrich; Running backs: 31 Jerome Morris; 21 Waldemar Schander; 2 Danny Washington; Wide receivers: 87 Christian Bollmann WR; 29 Felix Brenner WR; 81 Julian Dohrendorf WR; 3 Danilo Naranjo González WR; 85 Dominic Hanselmann WR; 6 Pascal Maier WR; 89 Alexej Mittendorf TE; 84 Niklas Römer WR; 30 Christian Welker TE	Offensive linemen: 69 Georg Bechtold OL; 66 Oliver Beeck OL; 61 Lars Hampel OL; 62 Nils Hampel OL; 58 Hannes Irmer OL; 74 Raphael Llanos-Farfan OL; 60 Sascha Sauer OL; 50 Nick Wieland OL; Defensive linemen: 76 Hendrik Bleier DL; 94 Maximilian Grewe DL; 65 Pascal Hogenberg DL; 70 Paul Krems DL; 78 Milan Misic DL; 92 Thomas Rauch DL; 99 Sven Rieger DL; 96 Robert Zernicke DL	Linebackers: 45 Rick Baunacke; 44 Simon Brenner; 56 Albert Langebartels; 41 Mario Nowak; 54 Steve Nzeocha; 13 Jasson Scott; Defensive backs: 26 Matthias Eck DB; 7 Leonard Greene DB; 20 Falk Horn DB; 32 Karl Michel DB; 25 Oliver Radke DB; 22 Mario Schmitt DB; 4 Roman Solovij DB; 33 Clemens Sommerfeld DB; Special teams: 15 Dennis Wiehberg K/P; Roster updated 2011-07-07

=== Japan ===
Japan National Football 2011 World Cup Team roster
Quarterbacks: 11 Naoki Maeda QB/WR; 29 Yasuhiro Maruta QB/RB; 6 Shun Sugawara; 8 Tetsuo Takata; 19 Minoru Tono; Running backs: 20 Takuya Furutani; 25 Kosuke Kimiyama; 31 Tomokazu Sueyoshi; Wide receivers: 85 Ryomi Hagiyama; 7 Shoei Hasegawa; 1 Noriaki Kinoshita; 84 Takahiro Haruta TE; 17 Michihiro Ogawa; 87 Yuji Oya TE; 83 Ken Shimizu	Offensive linemen: 77 Haruhisa Hiramoto OL; 71 Yutaro Kobayashi OL; 57 Kazuhiro Kuramochi OL; 75 Tsukasa Miyamoto OL; 67 Yuta Murai OL; 72 Takanari Murakami OL; 70 Tsuneno Sano OL; 73 Yuji Taniguchi OL; Defensive linemen: 53 Motoyuki Hirai DL; 93 Mitsunori Kihira DL; 92 Takeshi Nisikawa DL; 37 Munekazu Shikama DL; 41 Daiki Takechi DL; 43 Yasuo Wakisaka DL; 13 Masayoshi Yamanaka DL; 96 Takayuki Yoneda DL	Linebackers: 10 Kentaro Azuma LB; 2 Naoki Kosho LB; 42 Takashi Makiuchi LB; 55 Akinobu Soma LB; 45 Shoichiro Suzuki LB; 9 Masayoshi Tsukada LB; Defensive backs: 14 Masashi Fujimoto DB; 22 Ryohei Imanishi DB; 21 Koki Kato DB; 16 Takeshi Miyake DB; 24 Tadanari Sano DB; 27 Atsushi Tsuji DB; 36 Yuichi Watanabe DB; Special teams: 15 Daisuke Aoki K/P; Roster updated 2011-07-08

=== Mexico ===
Mexico National Football 2011 World Cup Team roster
Quarterbacks: 12 Bruno Márquez; 7 Raul Mateos; 4 Rodrigo Pérez; Running backs: 23 Jonathan Alejandro Barrera; 44 Juan Carlos Castillo; 22 José Reyes; Wide receivers: 8 José Antonio Alfonso; 84 Luis Araujo; 10 Erick Arzate; 81 Daniel Roldan; 85 Oscar Ruiz; 86 Hieberto Salazar; 25 Diego Viamontes	Offensive linemen: 55 Edgar Cavazos OL; 1 Mauricio López OL; 70 Santiago Maltos OL; 66 Noel Francisco Moreno OL; 58 Julio Cesar Nava OL; 61 Mario Rodríguez OL; 73 Mauricio Romero OL; 17 Salomón Solano OL; Defensive linemen: 57 Marcos Antonio Martinez DE; 6 Jesús Alfredo Muñoz DE; 42 Ariel Eder Onesto DT; 92 Diego Susarrey DE; 78 Miguel Ángel Uresty DT; 77 Everado Velazquez DL	Linebackers: 2 David Antonio Aceves; 74 Edgar Eumir Camacho; 40 Jovanni Carrillo; 3 Fernando Lozano; 15 Alberto Montembruck; 75 Raul Orozco; 16 Alonso Muñoz; 56 Manuel Padilla; 5 Jorge Valdez; 9 Alejandro Vazquez; Defensive backs: 24 Serigo Alenjandro Cantú CB; 11 Luis Felipe Jaimes SS; 28 Rassiel Gregorio López FS; 99 José Miguel Luna CB; 33 Eric Israel Mosqueda CB; 27 Fernando Ramírez CB; 21 Josué Romero CB; 13 Roberto Javier Silva CB; 6 Victor Saspe SS; Special teams: 19 José Carlos Maltos K; Roster updated 2011-07-08

=== United States ===
USA National Football 2011 World Cup Team roster
Quarterbacks: 5 Matt Bassuener; 7 Cody Hawkins; 11 Micah Brown; 13 Ben McLaughlin; Running backs: 40 Richie Brockel FB/TE; 37 Jason Haller; 32 Henry Harris; 1 Nate Kmic; 20 Taylor Malm; 25 Da'Shawn Thomas; Receivers: 81 Alex Anderson; 2 Ricardo Lenhart; 88 Mike Peterson TE	Offensive linemen: 60 Alex Alvarez OL; 78 Darius Henderson OL; 54 Brandon Jordan OL; 72 Frank Knights OL; 65 Josh Koeppel C; 70 Luke Summers OL; 77 Daniel Warderburg OT; 60 Cameron Zipp C; Defensive linemen: 91 Charles Bay DE; 51 Gerard Bryant DL; 99 Daniel Calvin DT; 55 Daniel Catalano DT; 93 Wacey Coleman DL; 92 Johnny Dingle DT; 98 Tyler Roach DL; 75 Nick Rossi DL/OL	Linebackers: 42 Demetrius Eaton; 43 Terrence Jackson; 56 John Jacobs; 23 Osayi Osunde; 44 Zach Watkins; Defensive backs: 30 Maurice Banks S; 10 Myles Burnsides S; 29 Diezeas Calbert CB; 18 Tommy Connors S; 27 Jeff Franklin CB/S; 21 Jordan Lake S; 12 DeWayne Lewis CB; 33 Joe Sturdivant S; 24 Daniel Tromello DB; 22 Stephan Virgil CB; Special teams: 17 Gregg Berkshire K/P; Roster updated 2011-07-08

== Matches ==
=== Group 1 ===
Team	Pld	W	L	PF	PA
United States	3	3	0	126	14
Mexico	3	2	1	94	32
Germany	3	1	2	52	90
Australia	3	0	3	20	156

Quarter	1	2	3	4	Total
Australia	0	0	0	0	0
United States	13	21	13	14	61

at Tivoli-Neu, Innsbruck, Austria

- Date: July 8, 2011
- Game time: 15:00
- Game weather: 24°C, light wind, sunny
- Game attendance: 6,000
- Box score

Quarter	1	2	3	4	Total
Mexico	7	3	2	10	22
Germany	0	7	0	8	15

at Tivoli-Neu, Innsbruck, Austria

- Date: July 8, 2011
- Game time: 19:00
- Game weather: 23°C, light wind, cloudy
- Game attendance: 4,500
- Box score

Quarter	1	2	3	4	Total
Australia	0	0	0	0	0
Mexico	7	21	25	12	65

at Tivoli-Neu, Innsbruck, Austria

- Date: July 10, 2011
- Game time: 15:00
- Game weather: 28°C, no wind, cloudy
- Game attendance: 5,000
- Referee: K. Yokochi
- Box score

Quarter	1	2	3	4	Total
United States	7	21	20	0	48
Germany	0	7	0	0	7

at Tivoli-Neu, Innsbruck, Austria

- Date: July 10, 2011
- Game time: 19:00
- Game weather: 26°C, light wind, cloudy
- Game attendance: 6,800
- Referee: F. Rasmussen
- Box score

Quarter	1	2	3	4	Total
Germany	14	9	0	7	30
Australia	7	7	6	0	20

at Tivoli-Neu, Innsbruck, Austria

- Date: July 12, 2011
- Game time: 15:00
- Game weather: 30°C, light wind, sunny
- Game attendance: 1,500
- Referee: K. Yokochi
- Box score

Quarter	1	2	3	4	Total
Mexico	0	0	7	0	7
United States	0	10	0	7	17

at Tivoli-Neu, Innsbruck, Austria

- Date: July 12, 2011
- Game time: 19:00
- Game weather: 28°C, light wind, sunny
- Game attendance: 4,800
- Referee: F. Rasmussen
- Box score

=== Group 2 ===
Team	Pld	W	L	PF	PA
Canada	3	3	0	112	51
Japan	3	2	1	86	47
France	3	1	2	44	96
Austria	3	0	3	36	84

Quarter	1	2	3	4	Total
Japan	0	17	0	7	24
Austria	0	6	0	0	6

at UPC-Arena, Graz, Austria

- Date: July 9, 2011
- Game time: 15:00
- Game weather: 32°C, light wind, sunny
- Game attendance: 6,000
- Referee: Bill LeMonnier
- Box score

Quarter	1	2	3	4	Total
Canada	7	17	7	14	45
France	7	3	0	0	10

at UPC-Arena, Graz, Austria

- Date: July 9, 2011
- Game time: 19:00
- Game weather: 28°C, light wind, sunny
- Game attendance: 5,000
- Box score

Quarter	1	2	3	4	Total
France	0	0	7	3	10
Japan	7	14	7	7	35

at UPC-Arena, Graz, Austria

- Date: July 11, 2011
- Game time: 15:00
- Game weather: 28°C, light wind, cloudy
- Game attendance: 2,500
- Referee: Bill LeMonnier
- Box score

Quarter	1	2	3	4	Total
Austria	0	0	0	14	14
Canada	7	7	7	15	36

at UPC-Arena, Graz, Austria

- Date: July 11, 2011
- Game time: 19:00
- Game weather: 26°C, light wind, cloudy
- Game attendance: 4,500
- Referee: H. H. Rieske
- Box score

Quarter	1	2	3	4	Total
Canada	7	10	0	14	31
Japan	7	7	6	7	27

at UPC-Arena, Graz, Austria

- Date: July 13, 2011
- Game time: 15:00
- Game weather: 30°C, light wind, cloudy
- Game attendance: 2,000
- Referee: H. H. Rieske
- Box score

Quarter	1	2	3	4	Total
France	0	0	17	7	24
Austria	0	3	0	13	16

at UPC-Arena, Graz, Austria

- Date: July 13, 2011
- Game time: 19:00
- Game weather: 30°C, light wind, sunny
- Game attendance: 4,800
- Referee: W. D. Le Monnier
- Box score

=== 7th place match ===
Quarter	1	2	3	4	Total
Australia	0	3	7	0	10
Austria	14	14	6	14	48

at Ernst-Happel-Stadion, Vienna, Austria

- Date: July 15, 2011
- Game time: 15:00
- Game weather: 23°C, light wind, sunny
- Game attendance: 4,128
- Referee: K. Yokochi
- Box score

=== 5th place match ===
Quarter	1	2	3	4	Total
France	0	7	7	3	17
Germany	0	7	7	7	21

at Ernst-Happel-Stadion, Vienna, Austria

- Date: July 16, 2011
- Game time: 15:00
- Game weather: 25°C, Light wind, Sunny
- Game attendance: 16,800
- Referee: W. D. Le Monnier
- Box Score

=== Bronze medal match ===
Quarter	1	2	3	4	Total
Mexico	0	7	0	7	14
Japan	0	10	7	0	17

at Ernst-Happel-Stadion, Vienna, Austria

- Date: July 15, 2011
- Game time: 19:00
- Game weather: 23°C, Light wind, Sunny
- Game attendance: 4,128
- Referee: H. Henning
- Box Score

=== Gold medal match ===
Quarter	1	2	3	4	Total
Canada	0	7	0	0	7
United States	7	30	13	0	50

at Ernst-Happel-Stadion, Vienna, Austria

- Date: July 16, 2011
- Game time: 19:00
- Game weather: 28°C, Light wind, Sunny
- Game attendance: 20,000
- Referee: F. Rasmussen
- Box score

The United States routed Canada 50–7 in the gold medal game of the 2011 IFAF Senior World Championship. The 20,000 fans in attendance at Ernst Happel Stadium in Vienna, Austria, set a record for an IFAF Championship game. The game was never close, with Team USA leading 37–7 at halftime. Team USA dominated the rushing game, outgaining Canada 247-48, with four different players scoring touchdowns on the ground. While Henry Harris led the way for the Americans on the ground, with 114 yards on 15 carries and a TD, RB Nate Kmic was the only American to score two touchdowns on the day. Team USA quarterback Cody Hawkins was 13 of 21 for 161 yards and 2 TD passes. The U.S. defense recorded four sacks, and Jordan Lake caught two interceptions. One bright spot for team Canada was Shamawd Chambers, whose 7 receptions for 74 yards bested the Americans.

== Individual statistics ==
=== Passing ===
#	Player	Att	Comp	YDS	TD	INT
1	(Germany) Joachim Ullrich	96	58	881	6	5
2	(Canada) Michael Faulds	97	64	805	6	4
3	(United States) Cody Hawkins	88	60	784	5	1
4	(France) Max Sprauel	98	57	575	5	1
5	(Japan) Tetsuo Takata	80	48	559	3	1
6	(Mexico) Rodrigo O. Perez	72	49	556	3	1
7	(Australia) Kiernan Dorney	83	40	465	3	3
8	(Austria) Christoph Gross	72	31	377	1	4
9	(Mexico) Bruno Márquez	42	22	368	2	2
10	(Austria) Thomas Haider	38	23	363	3	2

=== Receiving ===
#	Player	No.	YDS	TD	Long
1	(Germany) Niklas Römer	14	253	2	50
2	(United States) Nate Kmic	6	236	1	53
3	(Mexico) Jose Antonio Alfonso	13	226	1	76
4	(Canada) Scott Valberg	13	189	1	52
5	(Canada) Shamawd Chambers	13	174	2	47
6	(Austria) Jakob Dieplinger	9	173	2	54
7	(Japan) Michihiro Ogawa	9	157	1	38
8	(Mexico) Oscar Ruiz	12	152	1	44
9	(France) Jeremy Rabot	10	139	2	71
10	(Australia) Locklan Gilbert	5	134	2	76

== All-tournament teams ==
Head Coach of the tournament: (United States) Mel Tjeerdsma
MVP of the tournament: (United States) Nate Kmic #1 RB

=== First team selections ===
Position	Country	No.	Name
OL	(Mexico)	70	Santiago Maltos
OL	(United States)	77	Dane Wardenburg
OL	(United States)	75	Nick Rossi
OL	(Canada)	61	Matt Norman
OL	(Canada)	66	Zachary Pollari
RB	(Canada)	33	Matt Walter
RB	(United States)	28	Henry Harris
RB/WR	(United States)	1	Nate Kmic
WR	(Canada)	84	Shamawd Chambers
WR	(Japan)	11	Naoki Maeda
QB	(United States)	7	Cody Hawkins
K	(Mexico)	19	José Carlos Maltos
DL	(United States)	91	Charles Bay
DL	(United States)	99	Daniel Calvin
DL	(Canada)	90	Adriano Belli
LB	(United States)	44	Zach Watkins
LB	(Canada)	54	Anthony Maggiacomo
LB	(Mexico)	56	Manuel Padilla
LB	(United States)	23	Osayi Osunde
DB	(Canada)	20	Sammy Okpro
DB	(United States)	12	DeWayne Lewis
DB	(United States)	27	Jeff Franklin
DB	(Japan)	21	Koki Kato

=== Second team selections ===
Position	Country	No.	Name
OL	(Austria)	79	Valentin Gruber
OL	(United States)	65	Josh Koeppel
OL	(Germany)	50	Nick Wieland
OL	(United States)	67	Alex Alvarez
OL	(Germany)	64	Sascha Sauer
RB	(France)	22	Dimitri Kiernan
RB	(Mexico)	23	Jonathan Barrera
RB/WR	(Germany)	84	Niklas Römer
WR	(Austria)	1	Jakob Dieplinger
WR	(France)	18	Jeremy Rabot
QB	(Canada)	3	Michael Faulds
K	(Japan)	15	Daisuke Aoki
DL	(France)	45	Giovanni Nanguy
DL	(Japan)	43	Yasuo Wakisaka
DL	(United States)	98	Tyler Roach
LB	(United States)	43	Terrence Jackson
LB	(Mexico)	5	Jorge Valdez
LB	(Germany)	13	Jasson Scott
LB	(Austria)	58	Florian Hueter
DB	(United States)	22	Stefan Virgil
DB	(Canada)	21	Troy Adams
DB	(Germany)	7	Leonard Greene
DB	(France)	3	Arnaud Vidaller
