= Nick FitzGibbon =

Canadian football player (born 1987)

No. 33
- Position: Running back

Personal information
- Born: April 25, 1987 (age 39); Puslinch, Ontario, Canada
- Listed height: 5 ft 11 in (1.80 m)
- Listed weight: 210 lb (95 kg)

Career information
- University: Guelph
- CFL draft: 2009: undrafted

Career history
- 2011: Winnipeg Blue Bombers
- Stats at CFL.ca (archive)

Medal record

Men's American football

Representing Canada

World Championship
Silver medal – second place	2011 Austria	Team competition

Nick FitzGibbon (born April 25, 1987) is a Canadian former professional football running back who played for the Winnipeg Blue Bombers of the Canadian Football League. He was signed as an undrafted free agent by the Blue Bombers on September 27, 2011. He played CIS Football with the Guelph Gryphons.
