= Alexander Hoad =

Canadian football player (born 1984)

No. 22
- Position: Defensive back

Personal information
- Born: April 10, 1984 (age 42); Crawley, United Kingdom
- Listed height: 5 ft 9 in (1.75 m)
- Listed weight: 182 lb (83 kg)

Career information
- High school: Saint James Catholic High School (Guelph, Ontario)
- University: Ottawa Gee-Gees

Career history
- 2012: Helsinki Wolverines
- 2011: Canada national football team
- 2010: Mönchengladbach Mavericks
- 2009: Swarco Raiders Tirol
- 2008: Quad City Steamwheelers

Alexander Hoad
Medal record

Men's American football

Representing Canada

World Championship
Silver medal – second place	2011 Austria	Team competition

Alexander Hoad (born April 10, 1984) is a professional Canadian football defensive back who last played for the Helsinki Wolverines of the Vaahteraliiga in Finland. He was a member of the Canada national football team in 2011. Hoad also played for the Mönchengladbach Mavericks of the German Football League in 2010 and Swarco Raiders Tirol of the AFL in 2009. In 2008 after graduation Hoad signed and played arena football in the AF2 with the Quad City Steamwheelers. He played CIS football for the university of Ottawa Gee-Gees
