= Thaine Carter =

Canadian football player (born 1987)

No. 44
- Position: Linebacker

Personal information
- Born: May 19, 1987 (age 39); Nanaimo, British Columbia, Canada
- Listed height: 6 ft 0 in (1.83 m)
- Listed weight: 230 lb (104 kg)

Career information
- University: Queen's
- CFL draft: 2009: 6th round, 45th overall pick

Career history
- 2010: Winnipeg Blue Bombers*
- * Offseason or practice squad member only

Awards and highlights
- Presidents' Trophy (2008)
- Stats at CFL.ca (archive)

Thaine Carter
Medal record

Men's American football

Representing Canada

World Championship
Silver medal – second place	2011 Austria	Team competition

Thaine Carter (born May 19, 1987) is a Canadian former football linebacker. He was selected by the Winnipeg Blue Bombers in the sixth round of the 2009 CFL draft. He played CIS football for the Queen's Golden Gaels. Carter won the President's Trophy as the top defensive player in the CIS during the 2008 season. In 2008, he helped the Gaels to a perfect 8–0 regular season and was named the team's defensive captain.
