= Brian Guebert =

Canadian football player and executive (born 1981)

Profile
- Positions: Defensive end, Fullback

Personal information
- Born: December 19, 1981 (age 44); Saskatoon, Saskatchewan, Canada
- Listed height: 5 ft 9 in (1.75 m)
- Listed weight: 245 lb (111 kg)

Career information
- CJFL: Saskatoon Hilltops
- University: Saskatchewan

Career history
- 2003: Saskatchewan Roughriders*
- 2007–2009: Winnipeg Blue Bombers
- * Offseason or practice squad member only
- Stats at CFL.ca (archive)

Medal record

Men's American football

Representing Canada

World Championship
Silver medal – second place	2011 Austria	Team competition

Brian Guebert (born December 19, 1981) is a football executive and former Canadian Football League defensive end who last played for the Winnipeg Blue Bombers.

== Background ==
=== Early life ===
Guebert attended Lutheran Collegiate Bible Institute in Outlook, Saskatchewan, where his team won the six-man Saskatchewan High School Provincial Football Championship in 1998. He was selected as the Defensive MVP in the 1999 Can-Am Bowl, and was chosen as the Outstanding Defensive Lineman in the 1999 Saskatchewan Senior Bowl.

=== Junior football ===
Guebert played with the Saskatoon Hilltops, winning the Canadian Junior Football League championship in 2001, 2002, and 2003. In both 2002 and 2003, Guebert was selected as the Prairie Football Conference Outstanding Defensive Lineman. He was also chosen as the Hilltops' Outstanding Lineman in 2002 and their Outstanding Graduate in 2003.

=== University career ===
After completing his tenure with the Hilltops, Guebert moved on to play university football with the University of Saskatchewan Huskies. He was selected as a Canada West All-Star in 2004, and both a Canada West All-Star and First Team All-Canadian in 2006. He appeared in the Vanier Cup in 2004, 2005, and 2006.

In addition, Guebert is a member of the 2004-05 Huskie Athletics All Academic 1st Team and 2004-05 CIS Academic All-Canadian Team.

=== Professional career ===
Guebert attended training camp with the Saskatchewan Roughriders in 2003, appearing in one exhibition game against Winnipeg.

Guebert was signed as a free agent with Winnipeg on May 30, 2007, and was an active special teams player. He was released following the 2008 season.

After retiring from competitive football, Guebert was recruited as a co-interim coach for the University of Saskatchewan's football team. Later, he became the Executive Director of the Saskatoon Minor Football league. In 2021, Guebert was behind efforts to recruit players to play flag football, with an eye on participating in the 2028 Summer Olympics.
