= Jason Medeiros =

Canadian football player (born 1989)

Profile
- Position: Offensive lineman

Personal information
- Born: August 22, 1989 (age 37); Hamilton, Ontario, Canada
- Listed height: 6 ft 4 in (1.93 m)
- Listed weight: 315 lb (143 kg)

Career information
- University: McMaster
- CFL draft: 2012: undrafted

Career history
- 2013: Hamilton Tiger-Cats

Awards and highlights
- 47th Vanier Cup champion; Mitchell Bowl champion (2012); Uteck Bowl champion (2011); 2× Yates Cup champion (2011, 2012); CIS All-Canadian Second Team (2011)
- Stats at CFL.ca (archive)

Medal record

Men's American football

Representing Canada

World Championship
Silver medal – second place	2011 Austria	Team competition

Jason Medeiros (born August 22, 1989, in Hamilton, Ontario) is a Canadian football offensive lineman most recently for the Hamilton Tiger-Cats of the Canadian Football League. He was signed as an undrafted free agent on March 28, 2013.

After the 2011 CIS season, he was ranked as the tenth best player in the Canadian Football League's Amateur Scouting Bureau January rankings for players eligible in the 2012 CFL draft, and seventh by players in Canadian Interuniversity Sport. He is a graduate of St. Thomas More Catholic Secondary School in Hamilton and played CIS football with the McMaster Marauders and was a part of their 2011 Vanier Cup championship.

Also in 2011, Medeiros was part of the Canada roster that got the silver medal in the World Championship.

Medeiros was named a CIS All-Canadian in 2012. After going undrafted, he participated of the Hamilton Tiger-Cats training camp before returning to McMaster. He helped the Marauders reach their second consecutive Vanier Cup finals, reprising the previous year match against Laval Rouge et Or. This time, they would lose.

In March 2013, Medeiros signed with the Hamilton Tiger-Cats as a free agent. He was released in June without a single appearance in a CFL official game.
