= Richie Brockel =

American football player (born 1986)

No. 47
- Position: Fullback / Tight end

Personal information
- Born: July 24, 1986 (age 40); Phoenix, Arizona, U.S.
- Listed height: 6 ft 1 in (1.85 m)
- Listed weight: 251 lb (114 kg)

Career information
- College: Boise State
- NFL draft: 2010: undrafted

Career history
- San Diego Chargers (2010)*; Carolina Panthers (2011–2015)
- * Offseason or practice squad member only

Career NFL statistics
- Receptions: 4
- Receiving yards: 25
- Rushing yards: 13
- Rushing average: 3.2
- Rushing touchdowns: 1
- Stats at Pro Football Reference

Richie Brockel
Medal record

Men's American football

Representing United States

World Championship
Gold medal – first place	2011 Austria	Team competition

Richie Brockel (born July 24, 1986) is an American former professional football player who was a fullback in the National Football League (NFL). He played college football for the Boise State Broncos and was signed by the San Diego Chargers as an undrafted free agent in 2010. He was also a member of the Carolina Panthers until 2015. After the 2015 NFL season, Brockel retired from the NFL.

Brockel played high school football for Greenway High School in Phoenix

== NFL career statistics ==
Year	Team	GP	GS	Receiving					Rushing				
Year	Team	GP	GS	Rec	Yds	Avg	Lng	TD	Att	Yds	Avg	Lng	TD
2011	CAR	11	2	3	13	4.3	5	0	3	12	4.0	7	1
2012	CAR	16	0	0	0	--	--	0	--	--	--	--	--
2013	CAR	16	0	1	12	12	12	0	1	1	1.0	1	0
2014	CAR	4	0	--	--	--	--	--	--	--	--	--	--
2015	CAR	2	0	--	--	--	--	--	--	--	--	--	--
Career		49	2	4	25	6.3	12	0	4	13	3.3	7	1
