= Anthony Maggiacomo =

American football player (born 1984)

Anthony Salvatore Maggiacomo
Profile
- Position: Linebacker

Personal information
- Born: April 25, 1984 (age 42); Cambridge, Ontario, Canada
- Listed height: 6 ft 2 in (1.88 m)
- Listed weight: 222 lb (101 kg)

Career information
- College: Wilfrid Laurier
- NFL draft: 2008: undrafted

Career history
- Winnipeg Blue Bombers (2008); Montreal Alouettes (2009)

Anthony Maggiacomo
Medal record

Men's American football

Representing Canada

World Championship
Silver medal – second place	2011 Austria	Team competition

Anthony Salvatore Maggiacomo (born April 25, 1984) is a Canadian former professional football linebacker. He was signed by the Winnipeg Blue Bombers as an undrafted free agent in 2008. He played CIS Football for the Wilfrid Laurier Golden Hawks.

== Teaching career ==
Maggiacomo was previously a student teacher at Cameron Heights Collegiate Institute and a physical education teacher at Eastwood. He is now a physical education teacher and Sr. Football Coach at Jacob Hespeler Secondary School in Cambridge, Ontario.
