= Zachary Pollari =

Canadian football player (born 1986)

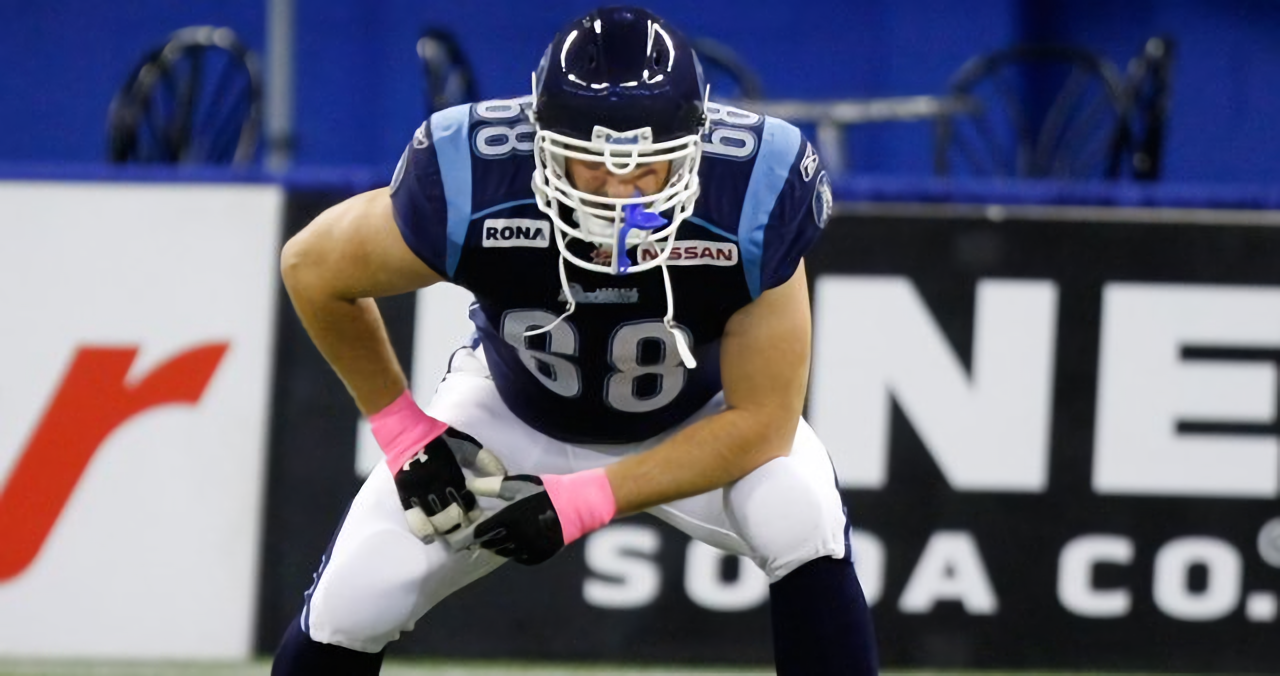
- Pollari with Toronto Argonauts

No. 68
- Position: Offensive tackle

Personal information
- Born: October 2, 1986 (age 40); Billings, Montana
- Listed height: 6 ft 6 in (1.98 m)
- Listed weight: 313 lb (142 kg)

Career information
- University: Western Ontario
- CFL draft: 2009: 4th round, 26th overall pick

Career history
- 2009: Toronto Argonauts*
- 2010: Toronto Argonauts*
- 2011: Toronto Argonauts
- 2012: Toronto Argonauts*
- * Offseason or practice squad member only
- Stats at CFL.ca (archive)

Medal record

Men's American football

Representing Canada

World Championship
Silver medal – second place	2011 Austria	Team competition

Zachary Pollari (born October 2, 1986) is a former Canadian Football League offensive tackle for the Toronto Argonauts of the Canadian Football League. He was drafted by the Argonauts in the fourth round of the 2009 CFL draft. Pollari was later released by the Argonauts on June 17, 2010 after a game vs the Hamilton Tiger-Cats in which he fractured his sternum. After his recovery, he competed for Canada at the IFAF World Championship In Vienna, Austria in the summer of 2011. He was selected as a 1st Team All-star at the tournament. That fall, he re-signed with the Toronto Argonauts on October 19, 2011. He was ultimately released on June 13, 2012. He played CIS football for the Western Ontario Mustangs from 2005 - 2009.

Pollari now lives in Guelph and is a teacher and coach at Centennial Collegiate Vocational Institute.
