= Wilson Cup (basketball) =

OUA men's basketball championship trophy

- The Wilson Cup in 2013
- Sport: U Sports men's basketball
- League: Ontario University Athletics
- Awarded for: Playoff champion of OUA men's basketball

History
- First award: 1909
- First winner: Toronto Varsity Blues (14)
- Most wins: Western Mustangs (25)
- Most recent: TMU Bold (3)
- Website: oua.ca/tournaments/mbball/2019-20/index

The Wilson Cup is the championship and trophy awarded annually to the Ontario University Athletics (OUA) men's basketball champion. The championship is played at the home of the highest remaining playoff seed from either the East or West Division, depending on the year.

== History ==
The Wilson Cup was first awarded for the 1908–09 season by Harold Wilson of Toronto. The Cup was originally the championship trophy of the first Canadian Intercollegiate Athletic Union which existed until 1955 and despite its name, was composed only of Ontario and Quebec universities. The Cup was then inherited by the original CIAU's successor, the Ontario-Quebec Athletic Association which eventually became the OUA. Since the 1962–63 season the Wilson Cup winner has gone on to compete for the national championship W. P. McGee Trophy. The 2021 championship was cancelled due to the COVID-19 pandemic in Canada.

== Current OUA playoff format ==
The 17 OUA teams are separated into two divisions: East and West. The top seeds in each division receive a bye in their respective division playoffs. The seeds ranked #3 and #4 play hosts to seeds #5 and #6 respectively, with the winners advancing to play the team seeded #1 or #2.

In the crossover round, the highest remaining seed in the East Division hosts the lowest remaining seed in the West and vice versa. The two winners of this round receive the OUA's berths in the USports Men's Basketball Final 8 and contest a one-game final for the Wilson Cup.

The Wilson Cup final is hosted by the team from the West in even numbered years and by the East in odd numbered years. If two teams from the same division qualify for the final, then the host shall be the highest remaining seed.

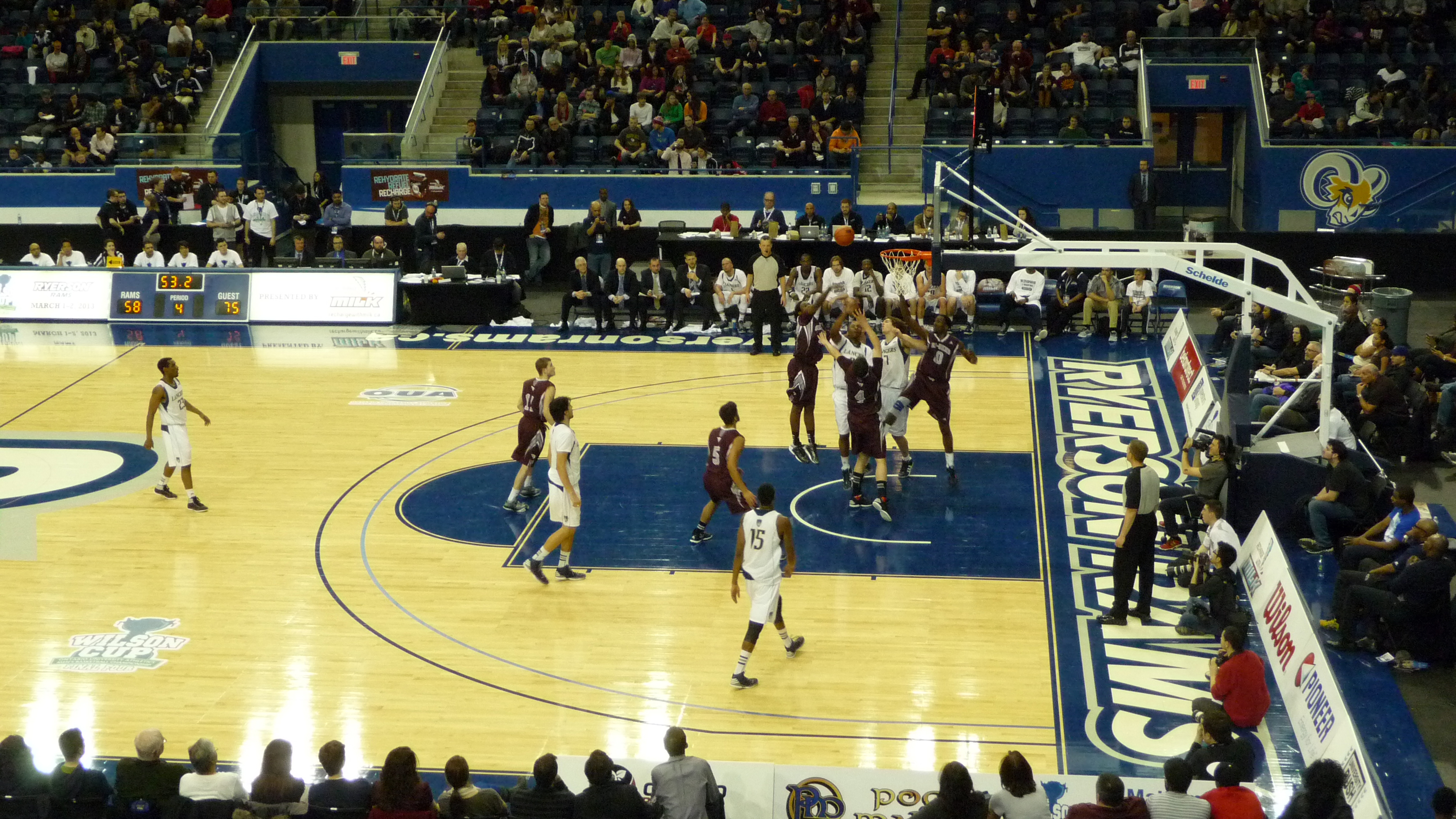
The Ottawa Gee Gees taking on the Windsor Lancers at the 2013 Wilson Cup.

== Champions ==
Year	Champions
1908-09	Toronto
1909-10	McGill
1910-11	Toronto
1911-12	McGill
1912-13	Toronto
1913-14	McGill
1914-15	McGill
1915-16	Not played due to war
1916-17	Not played due to war
1917-18	Not played due to war
1918-19	Not played due to war
1919-20	Toronto
1920-21	Toronto
1921-22	McGill
1922-23	McGill
1923-24	Queen's
1924-25	Toronto
1925-26	Queen's
1926-27	Western
1927-28	Toronto
1928-29	Toronto
1929-30	Queen's
1930-31	McGill
1931-32	McGill
1932-33	McGill
1933-34	McGill
1934-35	Toronto
1935-36	Queen's
1936-37	Toronto
1937-38	Western
1938-39	Western, Toronto and McGill
1939-40	Western and Toronto
1940-41	Not played due to war
1941-42	Not played due to war
1942-43	Not played due to war
1943-44	Not played due to war
1944-45	Not played due to war
1945-46	Western
1946-47	Western
1947-48	Western
1948-49	Western
1949-50	Western
1950-51	Western
1951-52	Western
1952-53	Western
1953-54	Western and Assumption
1954-55	Western
1955-56	Western
1956-57	Queen's and Assumption
1957-58	Toronto
1958-59	Assumption
1959-60	Western
1960-61	Western
1961-62	Western
1962-63	Assumption
1963-64	Windsor
1964-65	Windsor
1965-66	Windsor
1966-67	Windsor
1967-68	Western
1968-69	Windsor
1969-70	McMaster
1970-71	Windsor
1971-72	Windsor
1972-73	Windsor
1973-74	Waterloo
1974-75	Waterloo
1975-76	Waterloo
1976-77	Waterloo
1977-78	York
1978-79	Windsor
1979-80	York
1980-81	York
1981-82	York
1982-83	Waterloo
1983-84	York
1984-85	York
1985-86	Waterloo
1986-87	Waterloo
1987-88	Western
1988-89	Western
1989-90	Guelph
1990-91	Western
1991-92	Brock
1992-93	Ottawa
1993-94	McMaster
1994-95	Toronto
1995-96	McMaster
1996-97	McMaster
1997-98	Laurentian
1998-99	Western
1999-00	Laurentian
2000-01	Western
2001-02	Western
2002-03	Carleton
2003-04	Carleton
2004-05	Carleton
2005-06	McMaster
2006-07	Windsor
2007-08	Carleton
2008-09	Carleton
2009-10	Carleton
2010-11	Lakehead
2011-12	Carleton
2012-13	Carleton
2013-14	Ottawa
2014-15	Carleton
2015-16	Ryerson
2016-17	Ryerson
2017-18	Carleton
2018-19	Carleton
2019-20	Carleton
2020-21	Cancelled due to pandemic
2021-22	Brock
2022-23	Ottawa
2023-24	Queen's
2024-25	Ottawa
2025-26	Toronto Metropolitan

== Championships by team ==
Rank	School	Championships
1	Western	25
2	Toronto	14
3	Carleton	12
4	McGill	11
5	Windsor	10
6	Waterloo	7
7	York	6
T-8	Queen's	5
T-8	McMaster	5
T-10	Ottawa	4
T-10	Assumption	4
T-12	Toronto Metropolitan	3
T-13	Laurentian	2
T-13	Brock	2
T-15	Guelph	1
T-15	Lakehead	1
