= Julian Feoli-Gudino =

Costa Rican-Canadian gridiron football player (born 1987)

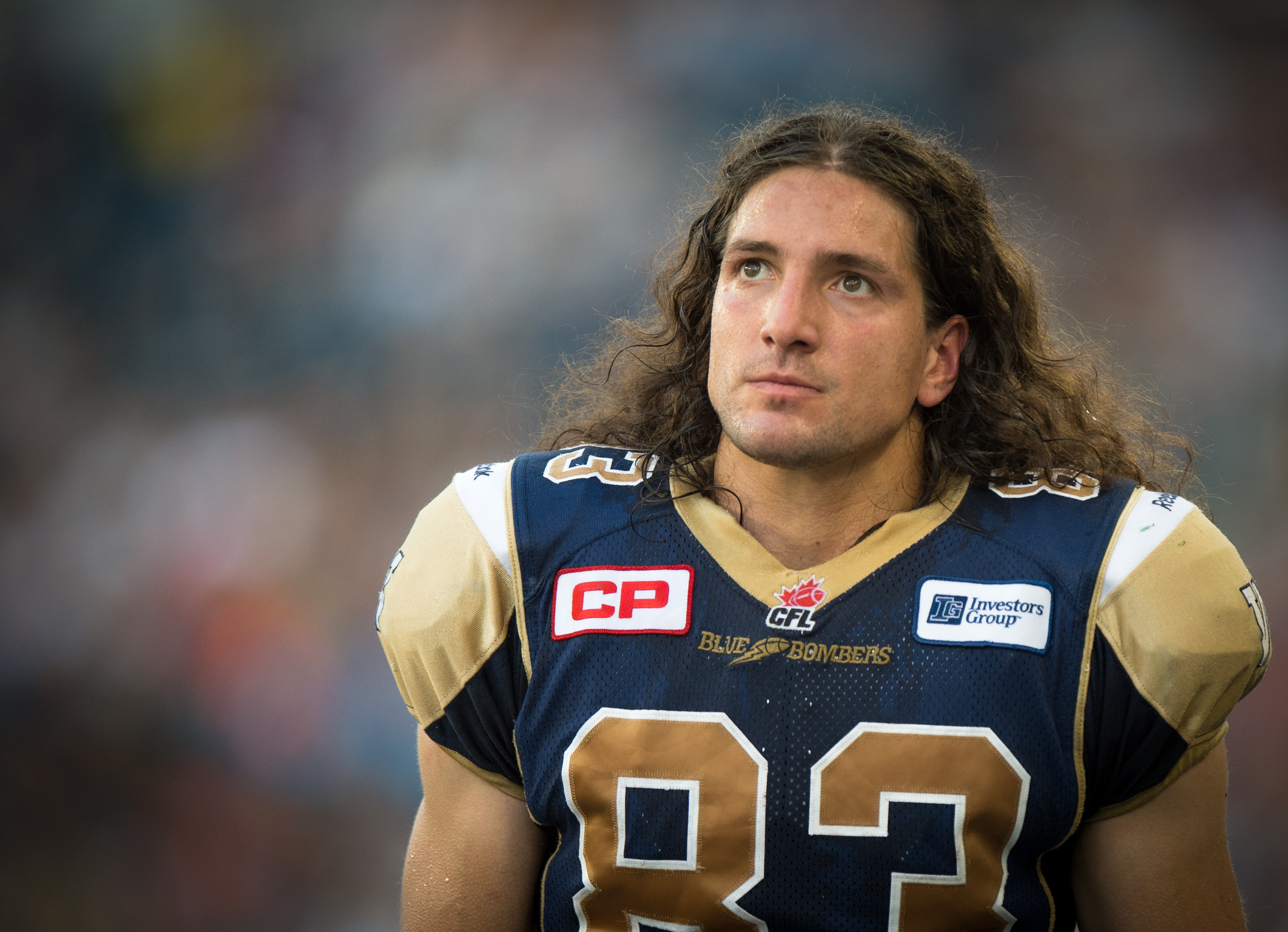
- Feoli-Gudino with the Winnipeg Blue Bombers in 2015

No. 83
- Position: Wide receiver

Personal information
- Born: June 22, 1987 (age 39); San José, Costa Rica
- Listed height: 6 ft 0 in (1.83 m)
- Listed weight: 200 lb (91 kg)

Career information
- University: Laval
- CFL draft: 2011: 5th round, 38th overall pick

Career history
- 2012–2013: Toronto Argonauts
- 2014–2017: Winnipeg Blue Bombers
- 2018–2019: Ottawa Redblacks
- 2020: Winnipeg Blue Bombers

Awards and highlights
- Grey Cup champion (2012); MVP of 2008 Vanier Cup; 2008 Vanier Cup champion; 2010 Vanier Cup champion
- Stats at CFL.ca

Julian Feoli-Gudino (born June 22, 1987) is a Costa Rican-Canadian former professional football wide receiver who played in the Canadian Football League (CFL). He was drafted by the Toronto Argonauts, where he won the 100th Grey Cup in 2012. He played CIS football for the Laval Rouge et Or. He also played for the Winnipeg Blue Bombers and Ottawa Redblacks.

== Early life ==
Feoli-Gudino was born in Costa Rica, and grew up in Montreal.

== Professional career ==
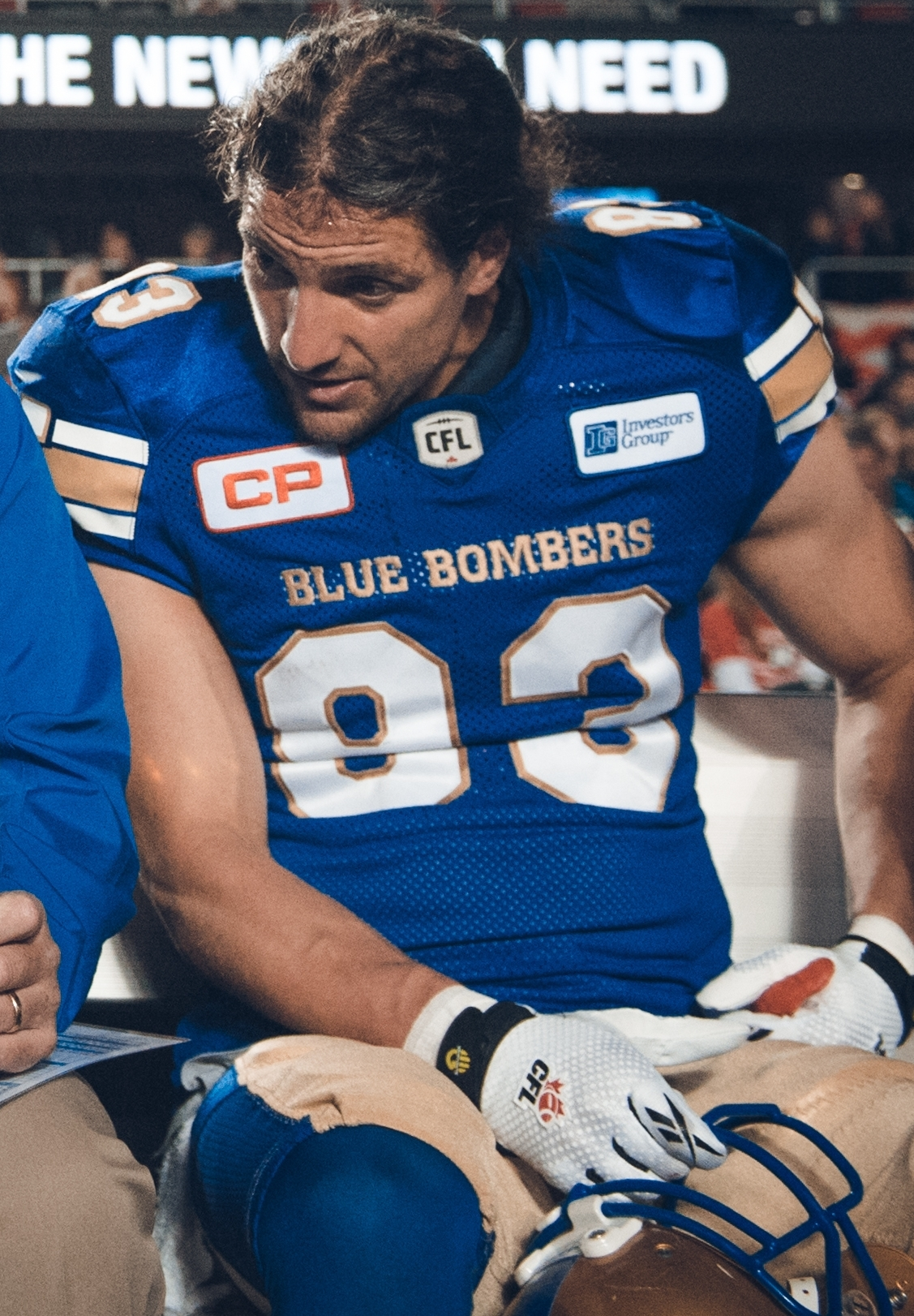
Feoli-Gudino with the Blue Bombers in 2016

=== Toronto Argonauts ===
Feoli-Gudino was drafted 38th overall by the Toronto Argonauts in the 2011 CFL draft, but he elected to play out his final year of college eligibility at Laval. Following the 2011 CIS football season, Feoli-Gudino signed with Argonauts on January 11, 2012.

=== Winnipeg Blue Bombers (first stint) ===
Feoli-Gudino signed with the Winnipeg Blue Bombers on January 21, 2014. He spent four years with the Blue Bombers, playing in 63 games and recording 111 catches for 1105 yards and seven touchdowns.

=== Ottawa Redblacks ===
Upon entering free agency, Feoli-Gudino signed with the Ottawa Redblacks to a one-year contract on February 14, 2018. Julian Feoli-Gudino had 11 receptions for 200 yards with two touchdowns in his first season with the Redblacks. Following the season he agreed to a one-year contract extension. In 2019, he played in eight games and recorded 13 receptions for 119 yards before he was released on August 12, 2019.

=== Winnipeg Blue Bombers (second stint) ===
On February 5, 2020, Feoli-Gudino signed with the defending Grey Cup champion Blue Bombers for the second time in his career. The 2020 CFL season was later cancelled due to the COVID-19 pandemic, and Feoli-Gudino became a free agent afterwards.
