= Marc-Antoine Fortin =

Canadian football player (born 1987)

No. 51
- Position: Defensive lineman

Personal information
- Born: August 28, 1987 (age 39); Quebec City, Quebec
- Listed height: 6 ft 4 in (1.93 m)
- Listed weight: 245 lb (111 kg)

Career information
- University: Laval
- CFL draft: 2011: 3rd round, 20th overall pick

Career history
- 2012–2014: Hamilton Tiger-Cats

Awards and highlights
- Defensive MVP of 2008 Vanier Cup; 2008 Vanier Cup champion; 2010 Vanier Cup champion
- Stats at CFL.ca (archive)

Marc-Antoine Labbé-Fortin (born August 28, 1987) is a Canadian football defensive lineman. He was drafted 20th overall by the Tiger-Cats in the 2011 CFL draft, but elected to play out his final year of college eligibility at Laval and finish his education. He signed with Hamilton on March 28, 2012. He played CIS football for the Laval Rouge et Or.
