= Benoit Groulx (Canadian football) =

Canadian football player (born 1985)

Benoît Groulx
Profile
- Position: Quarterback

Personal information
- Born: March 6, 1985 (age 41); Montreal, Quebec, Canada
- Listed height: 5 ft 9 in (1.75 m)
- Listed weight: 216 lb (98 kg)

Career information
- University: Laval
- CFL draft: 2008: undrafted

Career history

Playing
- 2005–2009: Laval Rouge et Or

Coaching
- 2010–2012: Bishop's Gaiters

Awards and highlights
- 2× Vanier Cup champion (2006, 2008); Hec Crighton Trophy (2008)

Benoit Groulx (born March 6, 1985) is a Canadian former football quarterback who played five years as a quarterback in CIS football for the Laval Rouge et Or.

Groulx grew up in Montreal. He attended the Cégep du Vieux Montréal and played for the Vieux Montréal Spartiates winning the Bol D'or 3 times and twice being named most valuable player in the CEGEP AAA league, before enrolling at Université Laval to study sports administration.

== University football ==
Though a few told him that he was too short, too slow, and had too little arm strength to compete at the university level, Groulx quickly impressed Laval head coach Glen Constantin at training camp. His performance in the regular season was equally impressive. Starting the season as a back-up, he came off the bench near the end of the week 2 game, when veteran William Leclerc was injured and again replaced Leclerc in week 3 this time mid-way through the second quarter and led a 61 to 15 victory over Bishop's Gaiters. His performance earned him the Quebec University Football League offensive player of the week honours in week 3 and the starting quarterback position. Groulx ended the regular season playing in 5 games with 1317 yards, 13 touchdowns, five interceptions, and 90 completions out of 132 passes, the highest completion percentage in the 2005 CIS football season. He also earned CIS offensive player of week 5 and QUFL player of the week honours for the Dunsmore Cup semi-finals 72–14 win over the Sherbrooke Vert et Or.

Groulx returned for his second season and equalled his 2005 season 68 percent completion average to again lead the nation with 170 completions in 250 passes for 2,422 yards, 12 touchdowns, and 6 interceptions over the 8 games of the regular season. His 2,422 yard passing performance set a new QUFL single season record and he was named the Jeff Russel Memorial Trophy winner as the most outstanding player in the Quebec conference and nominee for the national Hec Crighton Trophy. Groulx and the Rouge et Or went on to complete the year without a loss to win the 2006 Vanier Cup.

On January 14, 2010, Groulx was announced as the new offensive coordinator for the Bishop's Gaiters.

Regular season statistics

Year	Team	Completions	Attempts	%	Yards	Touchdowns	Interceptions
2005	Laval Rouge et Or	90	132	68.2	1317	13	5
2006	Laval Rouge et Or	170	250	68.0	2422	12	6
2007	Laval Rouge et Or	66	87	75.9	944	11	3
2008	Laval Rouge et Or	185	246	75.2	2385	12	2
2009	Laval Rouge et Or	101	138	73.2	1462	18	3
TOTAL	...	612	853	71.7	8530	66	19
