= Rodrigo Pérez (footballer, born 2003) =

Uruguayan footballer

Personal information
- Full name: Rodrigo Pérez Gutiérrez
- Date of birth: 17 October 2003 (age 23)
- Place of birth: Colonia del Sacramento, Uruguay
- Height: 1.65 m (5 ft 5 in)
- Position: Forward

Team information
- Current team: Plaza Colonia
- Number: 26

Senior career*
Years	Team	Apps	(Gls)
2020–	Plaza Colonia	1	(0)
- * Club domestic league appearances and goals as of 11 September 2020

Rodrigo Pérez Gutiérrez (born 17 October 2003) is a Uruguayan footballer who plays as a forward for Plaza Colonia.

== Career statistics ==
=== Club ===
As of 11 September 2020.

Club	Season	League			Cup		Continental		Other		Total	
Club	Season	Division	Apps	Goals	Apps	Goals	Apps	Goals	Apps	Goals	Apps	Goals
Plaza Colonia	2020	Primera División	1	0	0	0	–		0	0	1	0
Career total			1	0	0	0	0	0	0	0	1	0
