= Jim Allin =

Canadian football player (born 1986)

No. 16
- Positions: Defensive back, Kick returner

Personal information
- Born: March 14, 1986 (age 40); Belleville, Ontario, Canada
- Listed height: 5 ft 11 in (1.80 m)
- Listed weight: 170 lb (77 kg)

Career information
- University: Queen's
- CFL draft: 2009: undrafted

Awards and highlights
- 2008 CIS football season First Team
- Stats at CFL.ca (archive)

Jim Allin (born March 14, 1986) is a Canadian former football defensive back and kick returner. He went undrafted in the 2009 CFL draft. He played CIS football for the Queen's Golden Gaels.

In the 2008 CIS football season, Allin was named to the CIS All-Canadian first team as a kick returner and to both the Ontario University Athletics first and second all-star teams; the first as a returner and the second as a cornerback. He performed the best among defensive backs in three of the athletic tests at the 2009 CFL Evaluation Camp including setting a record for the 20-yard shuttle test with a time of 3.97 seconds.

In August 2016, in ceremonies in Canada and Australia, Jim married Tegan Hamilton. He was inducted into the Queen's Golden Gaels Hall of Fame in 2021.
