= Rodrigo Pérez (American football) =

Mexico gridiron football player

Current position
- Title: Head coach
- Team: UVM

Biographical details
- Born: Mexico
- Education: UDLAP

Playing career
- 2002–2006: UDLAP
- 2010: Jets de Balbuena
- 2011: Valencia Firebats
- Position: Quarterback

Coaching career (HC unless noted)
- 2007: UDLAP (QB)
- 2008: UDLAP (Co-OC/QB)
- 2009: UDLAP (DB)
- 2010: UDLAP (QB)
- 2011: Valencia Firebats
- 2012: UNAM (QB)
- 2013: UNAM (OC/QB)
- 2014: UNAM (OC)
- 2015: UNAM (OC/QB)
- 2016: Condors CDMX (OC)
- 2016: IPN (QB)
- 2017: ITESM México (OC)
- 2018–present: UVM

Accomplishments and honors

Championships
- 2 National (2013, 2014)

Awards
- 2× ONEFA Most Valuable Player (2005, 2006); Aztec Bowl MVP (2003)

Rodrigo Pérez Ojeda is a Mexican gridiron football coach and former quarterback who is the current head coach of the Linces UVM. Nicknamed "Goofy", he played college football with the Aztecas UDLAP, earning back-to-back ONEFA Most Valuable Player awards in 2005 and 2006. He is considered one of the best quarterbacks in Mexican history.

== Playing career ==
Pérez was influenced to play gridiron football at age eight by his uncle Ricardo, former head coach of the Águilas Blancas, and his father Francisco, who played the sport in his youth. He started out as a running back but eventually switched to quarterback. Pérez played for the Águilas Blancas at the infantile (15 and under) and juvenile (18 and under) levels before accepting a scholarship to play college football with the Aztecas UDLAP, representing the Universidad de las Américas Puebla from 2002 to 2006.

In 2004, Pérez led UDLAP to a playoff appearance after a four-year absence. The following year, he was named the ONEFA Most Valuable Player after throwing for 30 touchdowns and three interceptions.

In his final collegiate season, Pérez completed 195 of 289 passes for 2,571 yards and 28 touchdowns with seven interceptions, leading the Aztecas to an 8–1 record and earning the "Mario Villamar" ONEFA Most Valuable Player award for a second year in a row. He was also honored with the "Luchador Olmeca" Award, the highest award given by the Mexican Sports Confederation. He helped his team reach the ONEFA national championship game, though the Aztecas were defeated 43–34 by the Borregos Salvajes Monterrey. Pérez finished his college career as ONEFA's all-time leader in pass attempts, completions, passing yards, passing touchdowns, completion percentage and passer rating.

After graduation, Pérez played in Mexican semiprofessional leagues such as the Liga OMFA Pro, where he was a member of the Jets de Balbuena. In January 2011, he joined the Valencia Firebats of the Liga Nacional de Fútbol Americano (LNFA) in Spain for the 2011 LNFA season, where he was reunited with former college teammate Óscar Ruíz as his number one receiver. He also doubled as the team's head coach. Pérez led the Firebats to the LNFA semifinals, where they suffered an overtime loss to the Badalona Dracs.

=== National team ===
While in college, Pérez was selected to represent the Mexican All-Stars in the Aztec Bowl against the NCAA Division III All-Stars four times from 2003 to 2006. In 2003, he helped his team come back from a 31–13 deficit to win 34–31, handing the American squad their first defeat in the game's history. Pérez was named the game's MVP after throwing for three touchdowns. He was also chosen to play in the 2004 Tazón Amistad against Japan.

Pérez was called up to the Mexico national team ahead of the 2011 IFAF World Championship. He threw a touchdown to former college teammate Óscar Ruíz in their opening game, a 22–15 victory over Germany. He also tossed three touchdowns in their 65–0 win over Australia. In the semifinals against Japan, Pérez threw a touchdown to Heriberto Salazar, though Mexico lost the game 17–14 and finished the tournament in fourth place.

== Coaching career ==
In 2007, Pérez accepted an invitation by Aztecas UDLAP head coach Héctor Cuervo to serve as the team's quarterbacks coach. In four seasons with the program, he also served as co-offensive coordinator and defensive backs coach. In 2012, Pérez joined the Pumas CU as their new quarterbacks coach under head coach Raúl Rivera. He was promoted to the role of offensive coordinator, winning back-to-back national titles with the Pumas in 2013 and 2014.

Pérez enjoyed a short stint in the professional ranks, serving as the offensive coordinator for the Condors CDMX in the 2016 LFA season. Later that year, he worked as the quarterbacks coach for the Águilas Blancas of the Instituto Politécnico Nacional under head coach Ernesto Alfaro. Pérez was hired as the offensive coordinator for Borregos Salvajes México for the 2017 season, also working with the juvenile team.

In March 2018, Pérez was announced as the new head coach for the Universidad del Valle de México football team, the Linces UVM. It was his first head coaching job, and he was the fourth head coach in program history. In the first preseason game, Pérez faced his alma mater, UDLAP, losing 52–7.
