= Erik Galas =

Canadian football player (born 1986)

Profile
- Position: Slotback

Personal information
- Born: July 16, 1986 (age 40); Ottawa, Ontario, Canadian
- Listed height: 6 ft 2 in (1.88 m)
- Listed weight: 220 lb (100 kg)

Career information
- University: McGill University
- CFL draft: 2008: undrafted

Career history
- 2009: Montreal Alouettes*
- * Offseason or practice squad member only
- Stats at CFL.ca

Erik Galas (born July 16, 1986) is a Canadian former football slotback. He was signed as an undrafted free agent by the Montreal Alouettes in 2009. He played CIS football for the McGill Redmen. Galas was the all-time leader for catches in a CIS career. He was a Second-Team All-Canadian in 2007 and a First-Team All-Canadian in 2008.

He also played for the Mönchengladbach Mavericks of Mönchengladbach, Germany.
