= Waterloo Warriors =

University of Waterloo athletic teams

- University: University of Waterloo
- Association: U Sports
- Conference: Ontario University Athletics
- Athletic director: Roly Webster
- Location: Waterloo, Ontario
- Varsity teams: 38 (19 men's, 19 women's)
- Football stadium: Warrior Field
- Basketball arena: Carl Totzke Court
- Ice hockey arena: Columbia Icefield Arena
- Volleyball arena: Carl Totzke Court
- Mascot: King Warrior
- Nickname: Warriors
- Fight song: “The Black and White and Gold”
- Colours: Black and Gold
- Website: athletics.uwaterloo.ca

The Waterloo Warriors are the intercollegiate sports teams that represent the University of Waterloo in Waterloo, Ontario, Canada. The Warriors have found success over certain spans in football, hockey, rugby, golf and basketball among others, and the Warriors have won national championships in ice hockey (1974), basketball (1975), and women's swimming (1975). For many years from the 1960s through the 1990s, Warrior basketball games attracted the largest and rowdiest basketball crowds in the country. The Warriors Football teams have won two Yates Cup Championships, in 1997 and in 1999.

The Warriors have two sites used for varsity athletics; The Physical Activities Complex (PAC) located on the main campus is the site of the Carl Totzke Court, which is used primarily for basketball, while the Columbia Ice Field (CIF) complex on the north campus houses the Columbia Icefield Arena for Ice hockey, as well as Warrior Field on the opposite end, which has been the home of Warriors football since 2011.

Prior to 2011 the Warriors football team shared University Stadium with the nearby Wilfrid Laurier Golden Hawks. The stadium was originally built for the Warriors Football program, but was sold to the Regional Municipality of Waterloo in 1974 when the department could not afford repairs to the stadium. The stadium was later sold by the City of Waterloo to Wilfrid Laurier University in 1992, where it is now the home of the Golden Hawks.

== Varsity sports ==
Men's sports	Women's sports
Badminton	Badminton
Baseball	Basketball
Basketball	Cross country
Cross country	Curling
Curling	Fencing
Fencing	Field hockey
Figure skating	Figure skating
Football	Golf
Golf	Ice hockey
Ice hockey	Lacrosse
Nordic skiing	Nordic skiing
Rowing	Rugby
Rugby	Soccer
Soccer	Softball
Squash	Squash
Swimming	Swimming
Tennis	Tennis
Track and field	Track and field
Volleyball	Volleyball

=== Football ===
The Waterloo Warriors football team has been in operation since 1957, winning two Yates Cup conference championships in 1997 and 1999. Currently, they are one of six teams to have never appeared in a Vanier Cup game and the longest tenured program in the OUA to have never qualified for the national championship game. The team's 2010 season was cancelled after a steroid scandal, the biggest ever in Canadian Interuniversity Sports (Now U Sports) football history. The team last qualified for the playoffs in 2023.

=== Men's basketball ===
The men's basketball team has won 6 provincial championships and one national championship:

- W. P. McGee Trophy - National Champions (1): 1974–75
- Wilson Cup - Conference Champions (6): 1973–74, 1974–75, 1975–76, 1976–77, 1982–83, 1985–86

The Warriors men's basketball team competes in the West Division of the OUA conference of U Sports. The team began competing in 1957, the same year the university was founded. The team dominated the OUAA in the early 1970s, and a defining moment of the program was the 1975 CIAU final against the Manitoba Bisons, where in the last seconds of play, forward Phil Goggins made two consecutive shots to bring the Warriors to an 80–79 victory, which won them the championship.

=== Women's basketball ===
The Waterloo Warriors women's basketball program first competed in the 1971–72 season as the Waterloo Athenas. Prior to the 1997–98 season, they competed in the Ontario Women's Interuniversity Athletic Association (OWIAA), until their merger with the OUA. They entered the 1998–99 season as the Waterloo Warriors, since the Athenas name was abandoned for all female varsity teams. The team's best finish was in the 1978–79, when they finished in third place. They have also finished as semifinalists on three occasions, in 1976–77, 1985–86, and more recently in 2022–23.

=== Men's Ice Hockey ===
The men's hockey team has won 2 provincial championships and one national championship:

- David Johnston University Cup - National Champions (1): 1973–74
- Queen's Cup - Conference Champions (2): 1973-74, 1995–96

The Waterloo Warriors men's ice hockey team competes in the West division of the Ontario University Athletics (OUA) conference of U Sports. Brian Borque has served as head coach since the 2002–03 season. First competing in 1962, the team has won one national championship, in 1974. 22 years after their first national championship in 1996, they won the Queen's Cup again, but were unsuccessful in the national tournament.

=== Women's Ice Hockey ===
The women's hockey team has won one provincial championship:

- McCaw Cup - Conference Champions (1): 2023–24
- 2025 Women's Ice hockey Awards:
- Rookie of the year: #77 Gracey Smith
- MVP: #16 Carly Orth
- Most Improved Player: #7 Jalen Duffy
- Warrior Award: #42 Lyndsy Acheson
- Coach's Award: #21 Kassidy McCarthy

The Waterloo Warriors Women's Ice Hockey team competes in the West division of the Ontario University Athletics (OUA) conference of U Sports. Head coach Shaun Reagan has led the team since 2011, winning coach of the year in his first season. Initially starting off as a club team, they became a varsity team and joined the OUA in the 2002–03 season. The team clinched their first playoff berth in their third season, and have been had varying results since the team's inception, with most of their success coming after the 2019–20 season, which was cancelled due to the COVID-19 pandemic. After several consistently well performing regular seasons in 2021–22 and 2022–23, in the 2023–24 season the team went on to win their first ever conference title at the McCaw Cup championship after an 18–10 regular season record, and placed fourth at the U Sports National tournament. In the 2024-2025 season the defending McCaw Cup champions had a rematch of the 2023-2024 Provincial Championship. The black and gold fell short to the Varsity Toronto Bluesm losing 2-3. In the Miller Waste Usports Women's Hockey Championship the Warriors had a clean run winning 3-0, to the first seed Alberta Panda's, 5-1 to the Concordia Stingers but fell short, losing 3-0 to the Bishop's Gaiters earning a Silver Medal and finishing Second in the country.

=== Men's Golf ===
The men's golf team has won 11 provincial championships in team golf, and 8 individuals have won provincial championships representing the Warriors:

- Ruttan Cup - Team Championships (11): 1969, 1970, 1972, 1975, 2003, 2005, 2006, 2011, 2014, 2015, 2016, 2023
- McCall/Len Shore Award - Individual Golf Championships (8): 1961, 1972, 1995, 2006, 2010, 2011, 2014, 2015, 2023

The first men's team was created in 1958 and coached by Carl Totzke, the director of athletics from 1957 until 1989, when he retired. Jack Pearse became the golf coach in 1968 and in 1969 guided the Warriors to their first-ever conference title. The men's golf team is currently the Warriors' most successful sports team in terms of provincial championships, with 11. In 2015, they won the Warriors' 100th provincial championship. In the 2023-2024 season the Warriors took home the Ruttan Cup, scoring -3 under par and 13 strokes ahead of second place with 585. Zachary Burt took home the Len Shore award shooting -3 under par 68 in round two for the low male individual.

=== Women's Golf ===
The women's golf team has won 2 provincial championships in team golf, and 3 individuals have won provincial championships representing the Warriors:

- Liz Hoffman Cup - Team Championships (2): 2010, 2011
- Individual Golf Championships (3): 2009, 2010, 2013

The first women's golf team was fielded in 2005 under the guidance of coach Carla Munch.

=== Other Sports ===
The Waterloo Warriors also fields 16 other club competitive teams. These teams compete against club teams at other universities in organized leagues and tournaments. Certain club teams also play exhibition matches against varsity teams at other universities. Club teams include ringette, women's football, rowing, dragon boat, ball hockey, lifesaving, and artistic swimming, among others.

== See also ==
- U Sports
