= Anthony DesLauriers =

Canadian football player (born 1987)

Profile
- Position: Defensive back

Personal information
- Born: December 16, 1987 (age 38); Surrey, British Columbia, Canada
- Listed height: 6 ft 0 in (1.83 m)
- Listed weight: 185 lb (84 kg)

Career information
- University: Simon Fraser; Calgary
- CFL draft: 2009: 6th round, 42nd overall pick

Career history
- 2010: Toronto Argonauts*
- 2011: Montreal Alouettes*
- * Offseason or practice squad member only
- Stats at CFL.ca (archive)

Anthony DesLauriers (born December 16, 1987) is a Canadian former football player.

== Football career ==
DeLurieres was drafted by the Toronto Argonauts in the sixth round of the 2009 CFL draft and played CIS football for the Simon Fraser Clan. In January 2010, DesLauriers signed with the Argonauts but was released by the team on June 12. When Simon Fraser University joined the NCAA for the 2010 season, DesLauriers was ineligible to rejoin his team and transferred to the University of Calgary to play for the Dinos. On January 15, 2011, DesLauriers signed with the Montreal Alouettes as a defensive back.
