= Quebec University Football League =

The Quebec University Football League was the Canadian football conference for Quebec universities who participate in CIS football until the completion of the 2010 football season. It has since been renamed Réseau du sport étudiant du Québec football, or noted by the acronym RSEQ.

The champion is awarded the Dunsmore Cup and moves on to compete in a national semi-final Bowl game against one of the other three CIS football conferences. It is governed by the Réseau du sport étudiant du Québec.

The present constitution of the RSEQ was founded in 2001, following the departure of Queen's University and University of Ottawa from the Ontario-Quebec Intercollegiate Football Conference (OQIFC). First simply known as the Quebec Intercollegiate Football Conference (QIFC), it was renamed the Quebec University Football League (Ligue de football universitaire du Québec) in 2004.

== History ==
The history of university football in Quebec goes back to the early foundations of football in Canada. The earliest interuniversity football league was the Canadian Intercollegiate Rugby Football Union (CIRFU) which was formed in late 1897 and began competition in 1898. The CIRFU competed for the Yates Cup, donated by H. B. Yates of McGill University in 1898 and awarded to the league champion annually. Teams competing since that first year were McGill Redmen, Queen's Golden Gaels, and the Toronto Varsity Blues. In following years, they were joined by Ottawa Gee-Gees (1905–1912), Royal Military College (1913), Western Ontario Mustangs (1929–1970), McMaster Marauders (1952–1953, 1968–1970), and Waterloo Warriors (1968–1970). In addition, beginning in 1953, the Bishop's Gaiters, Collège Militaire Royal, Loyola College Warriors, Macdonald College Aggies, and St. Patrick's College (part of the University of Ottawa but team amalgamated with Carleton Ravens in 1967) joined a new Ottawa-St.Lawrence Intercollegiate Athletic Association.

In 1971, intercollegiate sport in Central Canada completely re-organised with the division of athletic associations along provincial lines and the Quebec University Athletic Association (QUAA) was formed but collapsed following the 1973 season. In 1974, the remaining football teams from the Ontario and Quebec provincial associations were combined into the new Ontario-Quebec Intercollegiate Football Conference (OQIFC) with East and West Divisions. All Quebec-based teams were in the East along with Carleton Ravens, Ottawa Gee-Gees, Queen's Golden Gaels, and, for the 1974 and 1975 seasons, Toronto Varsity Blues.

In 1980, the OQIFC re-organised again and the West division became the Ontario Universities Athletics Association and the East division retained the Ontario-Quebec Intercollegiate Football Conference name without the need of a division.

Following the 2000 season, the University of Ottawa and Queen's University withdrew from the OQIFC and joined the OUA football conference leaving the OQIFC with only Quebec teams so it became known as the Quebec Intercollegiate Football Conference (QIFC). In 2004, the QIFC was formally renamed the Quebec University Football League (QUFL).

== QUFL teams ==
University football programs in the QUFL are:

- Bishop's Gaiters
- Concordia Stingers
- Laval Rouge-et-Or
- McGill Redmen
- Montréal Carabins
- Sherbrooke Vert-et-Or

== See also ==
- U Sports
  - Canada West Universities Athletic Association
  - Ontario University Athletics
  - Atlantic University Sport
- Quebec Junior Football League
- Football Canada
