= John Surla =

Canadian football player (born 1988)

No. 43
- Position: Linebacker

Personal information
- Born: April 20, 1988 (age 38); Niagara Falls, Ontario, Canada
- Listed height: 5 ft 10 in (1.78 m)
- Listed weight: 225 lb (102 kg)

Career information
- University: Western Ontario
- CFL draft: 2011: undrafted

Career history
- 2011: Winnipeg Blue Bombers*
- 2011: Montreal Alouettes
- * Offseason or practice squad member only
- Stats at CFL.ca

John Surla (born April 20, 1988) is a Canadian former professional football linebacker in the Canadian Football League (CFL). He played CIS football for the Western Ontario Mustangs.

He was originally signed by the Winnipeg Blue Bombers on May 18, 2011 after going undrafted in the 2011 CFL draft. After failing to make the team, he signed with the Montreal Alouettes. On May 7, 2012, he was released by the Alouettes.
