= Michael Faulds =

Canadian gridiron football player and coach (born 1983)

Western Mustangs
- Title: Head coach

Personal information
- Born: November 11, 1983 (age 42); Eden Mills, Ontario, Canada
- Listed height: 6 ft 2 in (1.88 m)
- Listed weight: 197 lb (89 kg)

Career information
- Position: Quarterback
- University: Western (2005–2009)
- CFL draft: 2009: undrafted

Career history
- 2010–2012: York Lions (OC)
- 2013–2025: Wilfrid Laurier Golden Hawks (HC)
- 2026–present: Western Mustangs (HC)

Awards and highlights
- 3× Frank Tindall Trophy (2016, 2024, 2025); 4× Yates Cup champion (2007, 2008, 2016, 2024); 2× Yates Cup MVP (2007, 2008); 3rd All-time CIS passing yards (10,811)
- Stats at CFL.ca (archive)

Medal record

Men's American football

Representing Canada

World Championship
Silver medal – second place	2011 Austria	Team competition

Michael Faulds (born November 11, 1983) is a Canadian former football quarterback and the current head coach for the Western Mustangs football team.

== Playing career ==
Faulds completed his five year playing career in CIS football with the Western Ontario Mustangs as the team's starting quarterback. Faulds set the all-time CIS passing yards record in 2009 with 10,811 yards. He held the record until it was broken by Sherbrooke's Jérémi Roch in 2015.

== Coaching career ==
Faulds began his coaching career with the York Lions in 2010 where he served three years as the offensive coordinator. On January 8, 2013, it was announced that he had been hired as manager of football operations and head coach for the Wilfrid Laurier Golden Hawks. He was named Coach of the Year in 2016 and won the award again in 2024 and 2025.

On January 5, 2026, it was announced that Faulds had been hired as the head coach for the Western Mustangs, returning to his alma mater after the position was vacated by the retirement of his former head coach, Greg Marshall.

== Head coaching record ==
Year	Overall	Regular	Standing	Bowl/playoffs
Wilfrid Laurier Golden Hawks (OUA) (2013–2025)
2013	1-7	1-7	9th	
2014	4-5	4-4	6th	
2015	5-5	4-4	6th	
2016	9-2	7-1	2nd	W Yates, L Uteck
2017	7-3	6-2	2nd	L Yates
2018	4-4	4-4	7th	
2019	4-4	4-4	7th	
2020 U Sports season cancelled due to Covid-19
2021	3-4	3-3	2nd (OUA West)	
2022	6-4	5-3	4th	
2023	9-2	7-1	2nd	L Yates
2024	11-1	8-0	1st	W Yates, W Mitchell, L Vanier
2025	9-1	8-0	1st	L Yates
Laurier:	72-43	61-33		
Western Mustangs (OUA) (2026–present)
2026				
Total:	72-43	61-33		
