= List of Montreal Alouettes starting quarterbacks =

The following is an incomplete list of starting quarterbacks for the Montreal Alouettes of the Canadian Football League that have started a regular season game for the team. This list includes postseason appearances since 1986, but does not include preseason games. They are listed in order of most starts with any tiebreaker being the date of each player's first start at quarterback for the Alouettes.

== Starting quarterbacks by season ==
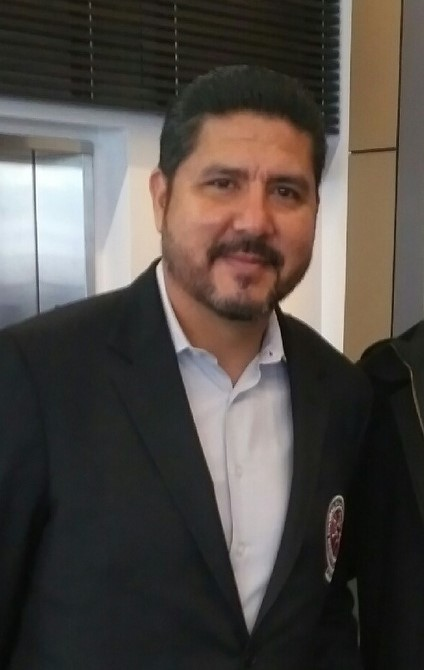
Anthony Calvillo is the Alouettes all-time leader in games started, passing yards, passing touchdowns, and completions.

Davis Alexander is the most recent Alouettes starting quarterback to win the CFL's Most Outstanding Player Award.

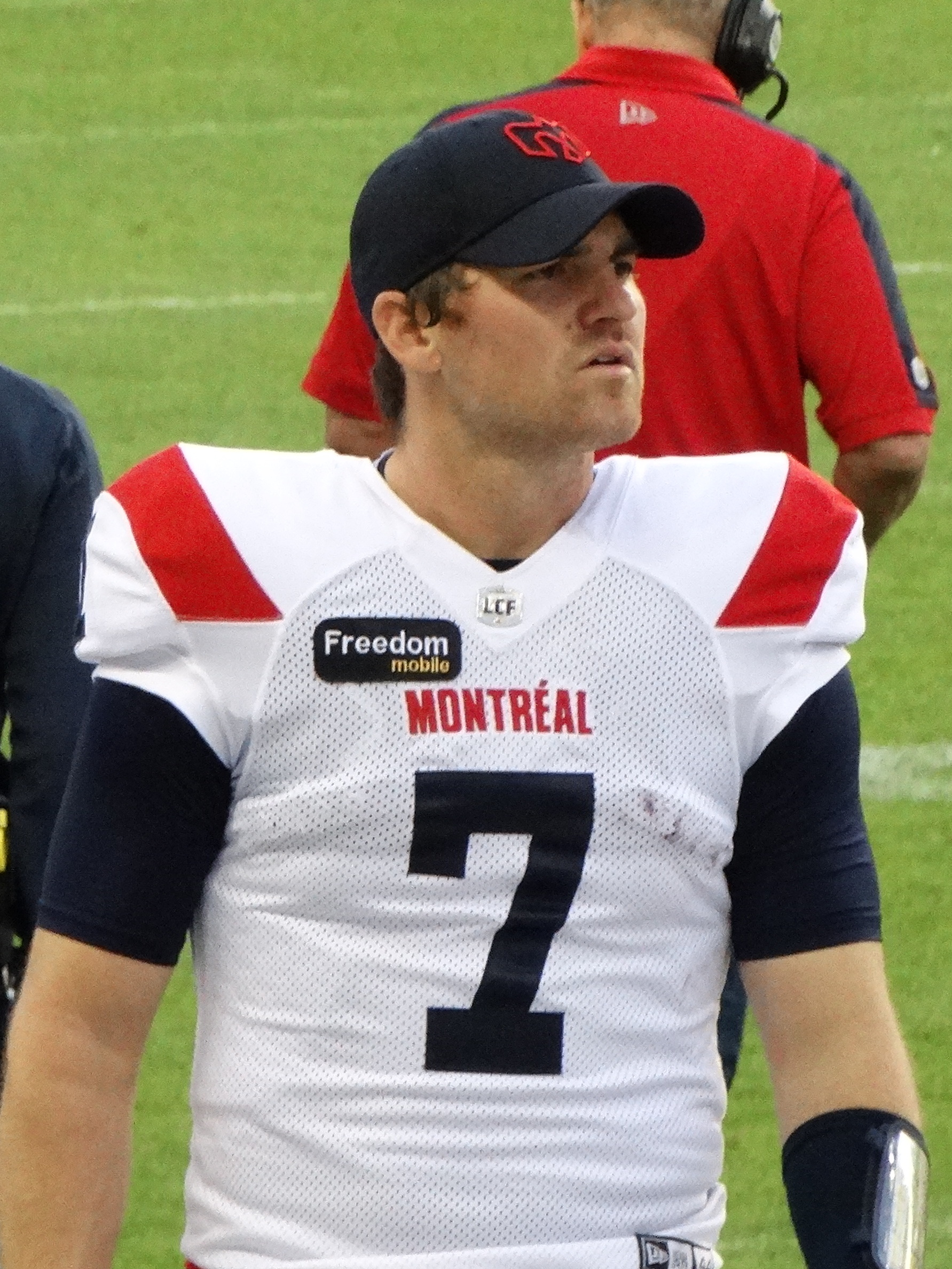
Cody Fajardo is the most recent Alouettes starting quarterback to win the Grey Cup.

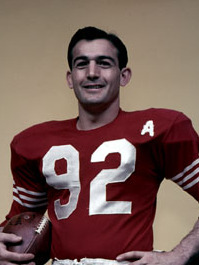
Sam Etcheverry started the second-most games in Alouettes history.

Where known, the number of games they started during the season is listed to the right:

Season(s)	Regular season	Postseason
2026	Davis Alexander (16) / Dustin Crum (2)	Davis Alexander (1)
2025	McLeod Bethel-Thompson (8) / Davis Alexander (7) / James Morgan (2) / Caleb Evans (1)	Davis Alexander (3)
2024	Cody Fajardo (13) / Davis Alexander (4) / Caleb Evans (1)	Cody Fajardo (1)
2023	Cody Fajardo (16) / Caleb Evans (2)	Cody Fajardo (3)
2022	Trevor Harris (15) / Vernon Adams (2) / Dominique Davis (1)	Trevor Harris (2)
2021	Vernon Adams (8) / Matthew Shiltz (3) / Trevor Harris (3)	Trevor Harris (1)
2020	Season cancelled due to COVID-19 pandemic	
2019	Vernon Adams (15) / Antonio Pipkin (2) / Matthew Shiltz (1)	Vernon Adams (1)
2018	Johnny Manziel (8) / Drew Willy (4) / Antonio Pipkin (4) / Jeff Mathews (1) / Vernon Adams (1)	
2017	Darian Durant (15) / Drew Willy (2) / Matthew Shiltz (1)	
2016	Kevin Glenn (9) / Rakeem Cato (6) / Vernon Adams (3)	
2015	Rakeem Cato (10) / Jonathan Crompton (3) / Kevin Glenn (3) / Tanner Marsh (1) / Brandon Bridge (1)	
2014	Jonathan Crompton (10) / Troy Smith (6) / Alex Brink (2)	Jonathan Crompton (2)
2013	Anthony Calvillo (7) / Josh Neiswander (5) / Troy Smith (3) / Tanner Marsh (3)	Troy Smith (1)
2012	Anthony Calvillo (17) / Adrian McPherson (1)	Anthony Calvillo (1)
2011	Anthony Calvillo (18)	Anthony Calvillo (1)
2010	Anthony Calvillo (15) / Adrian McPherson (2) / Chris Leak (1)	Anthony Calvillo (2)
2009	Anthony Calvillo (16) / Adrian McPherson (2)	Anthony Calvillo (2)
2008	Anthony Calvillo (17) / Marcus Brady (1)	Anthony Calvillo (2)
2007	Anthony Calvillo (13) / Marcus Brady (4) / Jason Maas (1)	Marcus Brady (1)
2006	Anthony Calvillo (18)	Anthony Calvillo (2)
2005	Anthony Calvillo (17) / Ted White (1)	Anthony Calvillo (3)
2004	Anthony Calvillo (18)	Anthony Calvillo (1)
2003	Anthony Calvillo (18)	Anthony Calvillo (2)
2002	Anthony Calvillo (17) / Matt Lytle (1)	Anthony Calvillo (2)
2001	Anthony Calvillo (15) / Dan Gonzalez (2) / Jamie Barnette (1)	Anthony Calvillo (1)
2000	Anthony Calvillo (17) / Stanley Jackson (1)	Anthony Calvillo (2)
1999	Tracy Ham (9) / Anthony Calvillo (9)	Tracy Ham (1)
1998	Tracy Ham (13) / Anthony Calvillo (5)	Tracy Ham (2)
1997	Tracy Ham (16) / Marvin Graves (2)	Tracy Ham (2)
1996	Tracy Ham (16) / Jimmy Kemp (2)	Tracy Ham (2)
1987–1995	Suspended operations	
1986	Brian Ransom (12) / Walter Lewis (4) / Joe Barnes (2)	
1985 *	Turner Gill / Joe Barnes	
1984 *	Turner Gill / Gerry Dattilio	
1983 *	Johnny Evans / Ron Reeves (4) / Kevin Starkey / John Rogan	
1982 *	Johnny Evans / Luc Tousignant (5) / Steve Alatorre (1)	
1981 *	Vince Ferragamo (10) / Gerry Dattilio / Ken Johnson	
1980 *	Gerry Dattilio / Joe Barnes	
1979	Joe Barnes (16)	

- * - Indicates that the number of starts is not known for that year for each quarterback

== Team passer rankings ==
Quarterbacks are listed by number of starts for the Montreal Alouettes.

Name	GS	W–L–T	Comp	Att	Pct	Yards	TD	Int
Anthony Calvillo	237	157–80–0	5,210	8,161	63.8	69,655	398	164
Sam Etcheverry	122	64–57–1	1,937	3,407	56.9	30,381	186	213
Sonny Wade	71	26–40–5	1,083	2,097	51.6	15,014	89	169
Tracy Ham	54	37–16–1	796	1,394	57.1	17,442	83	37
Vernon Adams	29	17–12–0	504	817	61.7	6,980	43	26
Cody Fajardo	29	16–12–1	590	818	72.1	6,967	31	23
Jimmy Jones	28	15–12–1	355	661	53.7	5,074	34	38
Turner Gill	28	12–15–1	411	727	56.5	4,928	32	23
Davis Alexander	27	24–3–0	657	917	71.6	8,773	51	10
Carroll Williams	23	3–18–2	282	557	50.6	4,670	29	48
Bernie Faloney	23	8–15–0	202	391	51.7	3,007	10	40
