= Montreal Alouettes all-time records and statistics =

The following is a list of Montreal Alouettes all time records and statistics current to the 2026 CFL season.

This list includes the records for the Montreal Concordes (1982 to 1985) but does not include Baltimore CFLers or Stallions records (1994 to 1995).

== Grey Cups ==
Most Grey Cups won, player

- 3 - Peter Dalla Riva
- 3 - Sonny Wade
- 3 - Gordon Judges
- 3 - Barry Randall
- 3 - Anthony Calvillo
- 3 - Ben Cahoon
- 3 - Anwar Stewart
- 3 - Scott Flory

Most Grey Cup appearances, player

- 8 - Anthony Calvillo
- 8 - Ben Cahoon
- 8 - Scott Flory
- 7 - Bryan Chiu

Most Grey Cups won, head coach

- 2 - Marv Levy
- 2 - Marc Trestman
- 1 - Lew Hayman
- 1 - Sam Etcheverry
- 1 - Don Matthews
- 1 - Jason Maas

Most Grey Cup appearances, head coach

- 3 - Peahead Walker
- 3 - Marv Levy
- 3 - Don Matthews
- 3 - Marc Trestman

== Coaching ==
Most seasons coached

- 8 - Lew Hayman
- 6 - Peahead Walker
- 6 - Jim Popp
- 5 - Marv Levy
- 5 - Don Matthews
- 5 - Marc Trestman

Most games coached

- 108 - Peahead Walker
- 90 - Marc Trestman
- 86 - Don Matthews
- 78 - Marv Levy
- 72 - Lew Hayman

Most wins

- 59 - Peahead Walker
- 59 - Marc Trestman
- 58 - Don Matthews
- 47 - Jason Maas
- 43 - Marv Levy

Most losses

- 48 - Peahead Walker
- 41 - Joe Galat
- 36 - Jim Popp
- 33 - Lew Hayman
- 31 - Marv Levy
- 31 - Marc Trestman
- 31 - Kay Dalton

== Games ==
Most games played

- 269 – Anthony Calvillo (1998–2013)
- 241 – Scott Flory (1999–2013)
- 230 – John Bowman (2006–19)
- 228 – Chip Cox (2006–18)
- 224 – Ben Cahoon (1998–2010)
- 218 – Bryan Chiu (1997–2009)
- 203 – Glen Weir (1972–84)
- 197 – Peter Dalla Riva (1968–81)
- 190 – Kristian Matte (2010–19, 2021–24)
- 185 – Don Sweet (1972–84)

Most seasons played

- 16 – Anthony Calvillo (1998–2013)
- 15 – Scott Flory (1999–2013)
- 14 – Peter Dalla Riva (1968–81)
- 14 – John Bowman (2006–19)
- 14 – Kristian Matte (2010–19, 2021–24)
- 13 – Gordon Judges (1968, 1970–82)
- 13 – Don Sweet (1972–84)
- 13 – Glen Weir (1972–84)
- 13 – Bryan Chiu (1997–2009)
- 13 – Ben Cahoon (1998–2010)
- 13 – Chip Cox (2006–18)

== Scoring ==
Most points – career

- 1,342 – Don Sweet (1972–84)
- 1,324 – Terry Baker (1996–2002)
- 1,142 – Damon Duval (2005–10)
- 698 – Sean Whyte (2011–14)
- 606 – Boris Bede (2015–19)
- 549 – José Maltos Díaz (2023–26)

Most points – season

- 242 – Damon Duval (2009)
- 220 – Terry Baker (2000)
- 210 – José Maltos Díaz (2025)
- 206 – Damon Duval (2008)
- 203 – Terry Baker (1998)
- 201 – Damon Duval (2006)

Most points – game

- 25 – Terry Baker – versus Calgary Stampeders, October 29, 2000
- 24 – Pat Abbruzzi – versus Hamilton Tiger-Cats, September 22, 1956
- 24 – Fob James – versus Hamilton Tiger-Cats, October 20, 1956
- 24 – George Dixon – versus Ottawa Rough Riders, September 5, 1960
- 24 – Mike Pringle – versus Saskatchewan Roughriders, August 3, 2000
- 24 – Mike Pringle – versus Edmonton Eskimos, October 9, 2000
- 24 – Mike Pringle – versus Calgary Stampeders, July 12, 2001
- 24 – Autry Denson – versus Ottawa Renegades, July 9, 2004
- 24 – Damon Duval – versus Toronto Argonauts, November 7, 2009

Most touchdowns – career

- 79 – Mike Pringle (1996–2002)
- 79 – Virgil Wagner (1946–54)
- 65 – Ben Cahoon (1998–2010)
- 59 – George Dixon (1959–65)
- 54 – Peter Dalla Riva (1968–81)
- 53 – Hal Patterson (1954–60)

Most touchdowns – season

- 20 – Pat Abbruzzi (1956)
- 19 – Pat Abbruzzi (1955)
- 19 – Mike Pringle (2000)
- 18 – George Dixon (1960)
- 17 – Robert Edwards (2006)

Most touchdowns – game

- 4 – Pat Abbruzzi – versus Hamilton Tiger-Cats, September 17, 1955
- 4 – Pat Abbruzzi – versus Hamilton Tiger-Cats, October 22, 1955
- 4 – Pat Abbruzzi – versus Hamilton Tiger-Cats, September 22, 1956
- 4 – Fob James – versus Hamilton Tiger-Cats, October 20, 1956
- 4 – George Dixon – versus Ottawa Rough Riders, September 5, 1960
- 4 – Mike Pringle – versus Saskatchewan Roughriders, August 3, 2000
- 4 – Mike Pringle – versus Edmonton Eskimos, October 9, 2000
- 4 – Mike Pringle – versus Calgary Stampeders, July 12, 2001
- 4 – Autry Denson – versus Ottawa Renegades, July 9, 2004

Most rushing touchdowns – career

- 74 – Mike Pringle (1996–2002)
- 55 – Virgil Wagner (1946–54)
- 45 – Pat Abbruzzi (1955–58)
- 42 – George Dixon (1959–65)
- 27 – Avon Cobourne (2006–10)
- 27 – Anthony Calvillo – (1998–2013)

Most rushing touchdowns – season

- 19 – Mike Pringle (2000)
- 17 – Pat Abbruzzi (1955)
- 17 – Pat Abbruzzi (1956)
- 16 – Mike Pringle (2001)
- 14 – Robert Edwards (2006)

Most receiving touchdowns – career

- 65 – Ben Cahoon (1998–2010)
- 54 – Peter Dalla Riva (1968–81)
- 48 – Jamel Richardson (2008–13)
- 48 – Kerry Watkins (2004–11)
- 42 – Hal Patterson (1954–60)
- 42 – S. J. Green (2007–16)

Most receiving touchdowns – season

- 16 – Jamel Richardson (2008)
- 14 – Jeremaine Copeland (2003)
- 13 – Ben Cahoon (2003)
- 13 – S. J. Green (2013)
- 13 – Tyson Philpot (2026)
- 13 – Tyler Snead (2026)

Most interception return touchdowns – career

- 4 – Anwar Stewart (2002–10)
- 3 – Harry Skipper (1983–85)
- 3 – Barron Miles (1998–2004)
- 3 – Marc-Antoine Dequoy (2021–23)
- 2 – Wayne Shaw (2002–03)
- 2 – Davis Sanchez (1999–2000, 2004, 2006-2009)
- 2 – Chip Cox (2006–18)
- 2 – Kabion Ento (2023–26)

Most interception return touchdowns – season

- 2 – Harry Skipper (1984)
- 2 – Barron Miles (1999)
- 2 – Davis Sanchez (2000)
- 2 – Wayne Shaw (2002)
- 2 – Anwar Stewart (2004)
- 2 – Marc-Antoine Dequoy (2023)

== Passing ==
Most passing yards – career

- 69,655 – Anthony Calvillo – (1998–2013)
- 30,381 – Sam Etcheverry – (1952–60)
- 17,442 – Tracy Ham – (1996–99)
- 15,014 – Sonny Wade – (1969–78)
- 8,773 – Davis Alexander – (2022–26)
- 6,959 – Cody Fajardo – (2023–24)

Most passing yards – season

- 6,041 – Anthony Calvillo – 2004
- 5,891 – Anthony Calvillo – 2003
- 5,633 – Anthony Calvillo – 2008
- 5,556 – Anthony Calvillo – 2005
- 5,257 – Davis Alexander – 2026
- 5,251 – Anthony Calvillo – 2011

Most passing yards – game

- 586 – Sam Etcheverry – versus Hamilton Tiger-Cats, October 16, 1954
- 561 – Sam Etcheverry – versus Hamilton Tiger-Cats, September 29, 1956
- 522 – Johnny Evans – versus Edmonton Eskimos, October 16, 1982
- 488 – Vernon Adams – versus Winnipeg Blue Bombers, September 21, 2019
- 477 – Anthony Calvillo – at Winnipeg Blue Bombers, September 24, 2010
- 475 – Anthony Calvillo – versus Winnipeg Blue Bombers, September 25, 2004

Most pass completions – career

- 5,210 – Anthony Calvillo – (1998–2013)
- 1,937 – Sam Etcheverry – (1952–60)
- 1,083 – Sonny Wade – (1969–78)
- 796 – Tracy Ham – (1996–99)
- 657 – Davis Alexander – (2022–26)
- 585 – Cody Fajardo – (2023–24)

Most pass completions – season

- 472 – Anthony Calvillo – 2008
- 437 – Anthony Calvillo – 2005
- 431 – Anthony Calvillo – 2004
- 408 – Anthony Calvillo – 2003
- 404 – Anthony Calvillo – 2011

Most pass completions – game

- 44 – Anthony Calvillo – versus Hamilton Tiger-Cats, October 4, 2008
- 37 – Johnny Evans – versus Edmonton Eskimos, October 16, 1982
- 37 – Anthony Calvillo – versus Toronto Argonauts, August 14, 2010
- 36 – Anthony Calvillo – versus Winnipeg Blue Bombers, September 24, 2010
- 35 – Anthony Calvillo – versus BC Lions, October 16, 2005
- 35 – Cody Fajardo – versus Calgary Stampeders, July 6, 2024

Most passing touchdowns – career

- 398 – Anthony Calvillo – (1998–2013)
- 186 – Sam Etcheverry – (1952–60)
- 89 – Sonny Wade – (1969–78)
- 83 – Tracy Ham – (1996–99)
- 51 – Davis Alexander – (2022–26)
- 34 – Jimmy Jones – (1973–75)

Most passing touchdowns – season

- 43 – Anthony Calvillo – 2008
- 37 – Anthony Calvillo – 2003
- 35 – Davis Alexander – 2026
- 34 – Anthony Calvillo – 2005
- 32 – Sam Etcheverry – 1956
- 32 – Anthony Calvillo – 2010
- 32 – Anthony Calvillo – 2011

Most passing touchdowns – game

- 6 – Sam Etcheverry – versus Toronto Argonauts, October 30, 1954
- 6 – Sam Etcheverry – versus Hamilton Tiger-Cats, October 20, 1956
- 5 – Sam Etcheverry – versus Hamilton Tiger-Cats, October 16, 1954
- 5 – Sam Etcheverry – versus Hamilton Tiger-Cats, October 15, 1955
- 5 – Gerry Dattilio – versus Toronto Argonauts, Sept 21, 1980
- 5 – Anthony Calvillo – versus Winnipeg Blue Bombers, July 24, 2003
- 5 – Anthony Calvillo – versus Winnipeg Blue Bombers, September 24, 2010
- 5 – Anthony Calvillo – versus Saskatchewan Roughriders, July 9, 2011
- 5 – Kevin Glenn – versus Ottawa Redblacks, August 19, 2016

Highest pass completion percentage – career (minimum 1,000 attempts)

- 63.8 – Anthony Calvillo – (1998–2013)
- 57.2 – Sam Etcheverry – (1952–60)
- 57.1 – Tracy Ham – (1996–99)
- 51.6 – Sonny Wade – (1969–78)

Highest passing efficiency rating – season

- 122.7 – Davis Alexander – (2026)
- 111.1 – Anthony Calvillo – (2000)
- 110.7 – Davis Alexander – (2025)
- 108.4 – Anthony Calvillo – (2009)
- 108.4 – Anthony Calvillo – (1999)
- 108.1 – Anthony Calvillo – (2010)

== Rushing ==
Most rushing yards – career

- 9,649 – Mike Pringle – (1996–2002)
- 5,615 – George Dixon – (1959–65)
- 3,749 – Pat Abbruzzi – (1955–58)
- 3,716 – William Stanback – (2018–19, 2021–23)
- 3,573 – Tyrell Sutton – (2013–18)
- 3,376 – Brandon Whitaker – (2008–14)

Most rushing yards – season

- 2,065 – Mike Pringle – 1998
- 1,778 – Mike Pringle – 2000
- 1,775 – Mike Pringle – 1997
- 1,678 – David Green – 1979
- 1,656 – Mike Pringle – 1999
- 1,520 – George Dixon – 1962

Most rushing yards – game

- 235 – George Dixon – versus Ottawa Rough Riders, September 2, 1963
- 234 – Mike Pringle – versus Toronto Argonauts, October 17, 1998
- 213 – Ike Brown – versus Hamilton Tiger-Cats, October 14, 1972
- 212 – David Green – versus Toronto Argonauts, October 20, 1979
- 206 – David Green – versus Toronto Argonauts, September 9, 1979
- 203 – William Stanback – versus Hamilton Tiger-Cats, July 4, 2019
- 203 – William Stanback – versus Toronto Argonauts, October 22, 2021

== Receiving ==
Most receiving yards – career

- 13,301 – Ben Cahoon – (1998–2010)
- 7,699 – Red O'Quinn – (1952–59)
- 7,431 – Kerry Watkins – (2004–11)
- 6,626 – S. J. Green – (2007–16)
- 6,598 – Jamel Richardson – (2008–13)
- 6,413 – Peter Dalla Riva – (1968–81)

Most receiving yards – season

- 1,914 – Hal Patterson – 1956
- 1,809 – Tyson Philpot – 2026
- 1,777 – Jamel Richardson – 2011
- 1,757 – Jeremaine Copeland – 2003
- 1,561 – Ben Cahoon – 2003
- 1,474 – Tyler Snead – 2026

Most receiving yards – game

- 338 – Hal Patterson – versus Hamilton Tiger-Cats, September 29, 1956
- 238 – Tyson Philpot – versus Saskatchewan Roughriders, September 13, 2025
- 232 – Hal Patterson – versus Toronto Argonauts, October 22, 1955
- 216 – Ron Robinson – versus Edmonton Eskimos, October 15, 1983
- 208 – Jeremaine Copeland – versus Toronto Argonauts, August 21, 2003
- 207 – Tyson Philpot – versus Winnipeg Blue Bombers, October 3, 2026

Most receptions – career

- 1,017 – Ben Cahoon – (1998–2010)
- 515 – Kerry Watkins – (2004–11)
- 499 – Red O'Quinn – (1952–59)
- 472 – Jamel Richardson – (2008–13)
- 450 – Peter Dalla Riva – (1968–81)
- 444 – S. J. Green – (2007–16)

Most receptions – season

- 124 – Tyson Philpot – 2026
- 112 – Ben Cahoon – 2003
- 112 – Jamel Richardson – 2011
- 107 – Ben Cahoon – 2008
- 102 – Nik Lewis – 2016
- 99 – Ben Cahoon – 2006
- 99 – Jeremaine Copeland – 2003

Most receptions – game

- 13 – James Hood – 1986
- 13 – Ben Cahoon – 2008
- 12 – Nick Arakgi – 1982
- 12 – Todd Brown – 1983
- 12 – Jock Climie – 1997
- 12 – Ben Cahoon – 2003
- 12 – Ben Cahoon – 2007
- 12 – Jamel Richardson – 2008
- 12 – Jamel Richardson – 2008
- 12 – Tyson Philpot – 2024
- 12 – Tyson Philpot – 2026

== Interceptions ==
Most interceptions – career

- 38 – Dickie Harris (1972–82)
- 34 – Ed Learn (1958–66)
- 30 – Barron Miles (1998–2004)
- 27 – Hal Patterson (1954–60)
- 25 – Harry Skipper (1983–85)

Most interceptions – season

- 12 – Terry Irvin – 1986
- 10 – Harry Skipper – 1983
- 9 – Tom Hugo – 1958
- 9 – Al Phaneuf – 1970
- 9 – Davis Sanchez – 2000
- 9 – Richard Karikari – 2005

Most interceptions – game

- 4 – Terry Irvin – versus Toronto Argonauts, November 2, 1986

== Tackles ==
- Note: Tackles were first recorded in 1987, but there was no differentiation between Defensive and Special Teams tackles. Those categorical differences were added in 1991.

Most defensive tackles – career

- 979 – Chip Cox (2006–18)
- 480 – John Bowman (2006–19)
- 390 – Tyrice Beverette (2022–26)
- 377 – Kyries Hebert (2012–17)
- 320 – Stefen Reid (1996–2002)
- 312 – Tracy Gravely (1996–2001)

Most defensive tackles – season

- 115 – Chip Cox – 2013
- 108 – Hénoc Muamba – 2018
- 110 – Tracy Gravely – 1996
- 110 – Kyries Hebert – 2017
- 107 – Darnell Sankey – 2024
- 104 – Winston Venable – 2015

Most defensive tackles – game

- 13 – Chip Cox – at Calgary Stampeders, July 1, 2012
- 13 – Bear Woods – versus Toronto Argonauts, July 25, 2016
- 13 – Branden Dozier – at Ottawa Redblacks, August 11, 2018

Most special teams tackles – career

- 101 – Alexandre Gagné (2021–26)
- 94 – Chip Cox (2006–18)
- 93 – Daryl Townsend (2011–17)
- 88 – Walter Spencer (2007–11, 2013)
- 76 – Hency Charles (1996–99)
- 74 – William Loftus (1998–2004)

Most special teams tackles – season

- 31 – Hency Charles – 1998
- 30 – Walter Spencer – 2007
- 30 – Tyrell Richards – 2025

== Quarterback sacks (since 1981) ==
Most sacks – career

- 134 – John Bowman (2006–19)
- 66 – Anwar Stewart (2002–11, 13)
- 52 – Elfrid Payton (1996–99)
- 44 – Doug Scott (1980–86)
- 37 – Swift Burch (1997–2001)
- 36 – Ed Philion (1999–2006)

Most sacks – season

- 21 – Brett Williams – 1986
- 19 – John Bowman – 2015
- 16 – Elfrid Payton – 1998
- 16 – Elfrid Payton – 1999
- 15 – Steve Raquet – 1984
- 15 – Grant Carter – 1996

Most sacks – game

- 5 – Elfrid Payton – versus Winnipeg Blue Bombers, September 9, 1999
- 5 – Duane Butler – versus Winnipeg Blue Bombers, July 24, 2003

== Field goals ==
Most field goals – career

- 312 – Don Sweet (1972–84)
- 282 – Terry Baker (1996–2002)
- 254 – Damon Duval (2005–10)
- 160 – Sean Whyte (2011–14)
- 141 – Boris Bede (2015–19)

Most field goals – season

- 58 – José Maltos Díaz (2025)
- 55 – Damon Duval (2009)
- 51 – Damon Duval (2006)
- 47 – Terry Baker (1998)
- 46 – Terry Baker (2000)
- 45 – Sean Whyte (2011)

Most field goals – game

- 7 – Terry Baker – at Hamilton Tiger-Cats, November 1, 1998
- 7 – Terry Baker – at Calgary Stampeders, October 29, 2000
- 7 – Damon Duval – at Toronto Argonauts, November 7, 2009
- 7 – Damon Duval – versus Hamilton Tiger-Cats, July 22, 2010
- 6 – ten times, most recently, José Maltos Díaz – versus Ottawa Redblacks, June 13, 2025

Highest field goal accuracy – career (minimum 100 attempts)

- 90.20% (138/153) – José Maltos Díaz (2023–26)
- 84.21% (160/190) – Sean Whyte (2011–14)
- 82.46% (141/171) – Boris Bede (2015–19)
- 81.17% (125/154) – David Côté (2021–24)
- 79.62% (254/319) – Damon Duval (2005–10)
- 76.92% (80/104) – Matt Kellett (2003–04)

Highest field goal accuracy – season (minimum 30 attempts)

- 93.02% (40/43) – José Maltos Díaz (2026)
- 91.67% (33/36) – José Maltos Díaz (2024)
- 90.00% (36/40) – Boris Bede (2015)
- 89.23% (58/65) – José Maltos Díaz (2025)
- 88.57% (31/35) – Boris Bede (2019)
- 87.30% (55/63) – Damon Duval (2009)

Longest field goal

- 58 yards – José Maltos Díaz – at Calgary Stampeders, July 25, 2025
- 56 yards – José Maltos Díaz – versus Saskatchewan Roughriders, August 2, 2025
- 54 yards – David Ray – at Ottawa Rough Riders, October 26, 1968
- 54 yards – José Maltos Díaz – versus Saskatchewan Roughriders, August 2, 2025
- 53 yards – Damon Duval – at Toronto Argonauts, October 3, 2009
- 53 yards – Boris Bede – versus Ottawa Redblacks, August 31, 2017
- 53 yards – Boris Bede – versus Ottawa Redblacks, June 30, 2016
- 53 yards – David Côté – at Edmonton Elks, June 15, 2024
- 53 yards – José Maltos Díaz – at Calgary Stampeders, September 14, 2024
- 53 yards – José Maltos Díaz – versus Edmonton Elks, August 8, 2025
- 53 yards – José Maltos Díaz – versus Ottawa Redblacks, October 13, 2025

Most consecutive field goals

- 25 – José Maltos Díaz (2025–26)
- 24 – Sean Whyte (2011)
- 21 – Don Sweet (1976)
- 21 – Sean Whyte (2014)
- 21 – José Maltos Díaz (2024)
- 19 – Damon Duval (2009)
