= Darryal Wilson =

American football player (born 1960)

No. 48
- Position: Wide receiver

Personal information
- Born: September 19, 1960 (age 66); Florence, Alabama, U.S.
- Listed height: 6 ft 0 in (1.83 m)
- Listed weight: 182 lb (83 kg)

Career information
- High school: Virginia (Bristol, Virginia)
- College: Tennessee
- NFL draft: 1983: 2nd round, 47th overall pick

Career history
- New England Patriots (1983–1985)

Career NFL statistics
- Games played: 9
- Stats at Pro Football Reference

Darryal Edgar Wilson (born September 19, 1960) is an American former professional football player who was a wide receiver in the National Football League (NFL) for the New England Patriots. He played college football and track and field at the University of Tennessee.

== Early life ==
Wilson attended Virginia High School, where he practiced football and track. He accepted a football scholarship from the University of Tennessee. As a junior, he appeared in 11 games, registering 5 receptions for 89 yards (17.8-yard avg.) and no touchdowns.

As a senior, he appeared in 11 games, ranking third on the team with 23 receptions for 308 yards (13.4-yard avg.) and one touchdown. He played in an era when Tennessee garnered a reputation as "Wide Receiver U", being part of teams that had wide receivers Willie Gault, Anthony Hancock, Lenny Taylor, Mike Miller, Clyde Duncan, and Tim McGee.

Running for the Tennessee Volunteers men's track and field team, Wilson won the 1980 and 1981 4 × 400 meter relay at the NCAA Division I Outdoor Track and Field Championships.

== Professional career ==
Wilson was selected by the New England Patriots in the second round (47th overall) of the 1983 NFL draft. As a rookie, he appeared in nine games as a backup, before being lost for the year with a right knee injury he suffered in the ninth game against the Atlanta Falcons. He was placed on the injured reserve list on November 4.

In training camp in 1984, he re-injured his knee and was lost for the year. He was placed on the physically-unable-to-perform list on August 14. In 1985, he was again placed on the physically-unable-to-perform list on August 15. He was waived on February 7, 1986.
