= Steve Alatorre =

American gridiron football player (born 1959)

Profile
- Position: Quarterback

Personal information
- Born: September 3, 1959 (age 67); Los Angeles County, California, U.S.
- Listed height: 6 ft 0 in (1.83 m)
- Listed weight: 175 lb (79 kg)

Career information
- High school: Cypress HS
- College: Tennessee

Career history
- 1982: Saskatchewan Roughriders*
- 1982: Montreal Concordes
- * Offseason or practice squad member only

Steven Michael Alatorre (born September 3, 1959) is an American former football quarterback who played for the Montreal Concordes of the Canadian Football League (CFL).

== Early life ==
Alatorre attended and played high school football at Cypress High School.

== College career ==
Alatorre played college football at Cypress College from 1977 to 1979 before transferring to Tennessee, where he was the starting quarterback during part of the 1980 season and the 1981 season. During his two years at Tennessee, he completed 139 of 273 passes for 1,918 yards, 13 touchdowns, and 20 interceptions under head coach Johnny Majors. He led the Volunteers to a 28–21 win over Wisconsin in the 1981 Garden State Bowl, completing 24 of 42 passes for 315 yards and a touchdown, and winning the game's MVP honors. Alatorre's efforts in the 1981 season helped lead Tennessee to an 8–4 finish, which marked the most wins for the program since 1973.

== Professional career ==
Alatorre played three regular season games for the Concordes. On 22 attempts, Alatorre passed for 114 yards, one touchdown, and one interception. Alatorre signed with the Saskatchewan Roughriders of the CFL in 1982 and was traded to the Montreal Concordes before the start of the regular season. Due to an injury to Ken Johnson, Alatorre started the first game of the 1982 season. However, he was replaced by Luc Tousignant to begin the second half.

== See also ==
- List of Tennessee Volunteers starting quarterbacks
- List of Montreal Alouettes starting quarterbacks
