= Anthony Hancock (American football) =

American football player (born 1960)

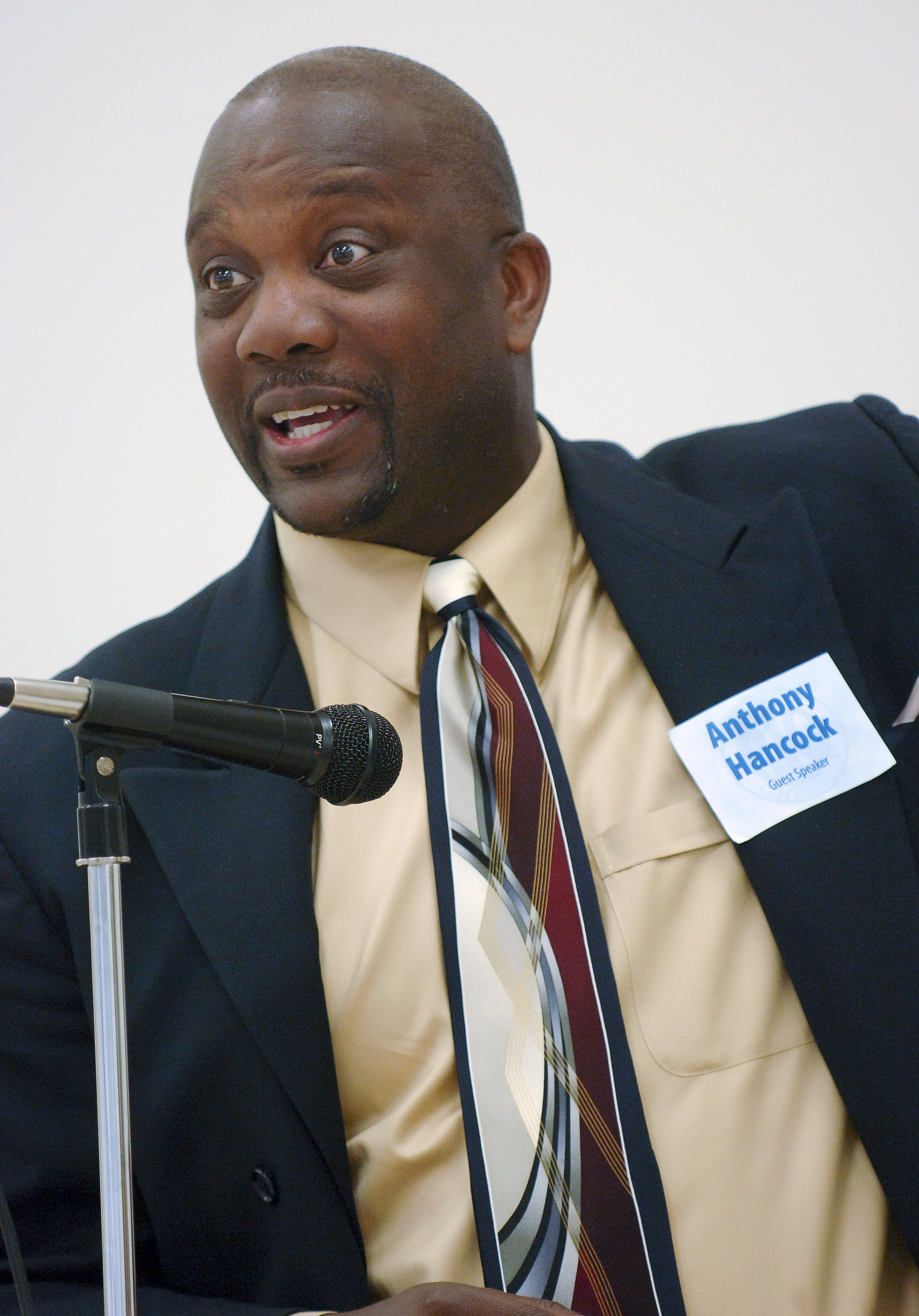
- Hancock in 2008

No. 82
- Position: Wide receiver

Personal information
- Born: June 10, 1960 (age 66); Cleveland, Ohio, U.S.
- Listed height: 6 ft 0 in (1.83 m)
- Listed weight: 200 lb (91 kg)

Career information
- High school: John Hay (Cleveland)
- College: Tennessee
- NFL draft: 1982: 1st round, 11th overall pick

Career history
- Kansas City Chiefs (1982–1986); San Diego Chargers (1987)*
- * Offseason or practice squad member only

Awards and highlights
- 2× Second-team All-SEC (1980, 1981)

Career NFL statistics
- Receptions: 73
- Receiving yards: 1,266
- Touchdowns: 5
- Stats at Pro Football Reference

Anthony Duane Hancock (born June 10, 1960) is an American former professional football player who was a wide receiver for the Kansas City Chiefs of the National Football League (NFL). A first-round draft pick in the 1982 NFL draft, he played for five seasons with the Chiefs, retiring following the 1986 season. He played college football at the Tennessee Volunteers, leading the school in receiving in three consecutive seasons (1979–1981).

Now a teacher at Bearden Middle School in Knoxville, Tennessee, Hancock is active with the Tennessee Education Association (TEA). In 2012, he ran unsuccessfully for a seat in the Tennessee House of Representatives, losing to the incumbent, Steve Hall.

== Early life ==
Hancock was born in Cleveland, Ohio. One of nine children, his father worked for Ford. He played running back at Cleveland's John Hay High School under Coach Sonny Harris, twice rushing for more than a thousand yards per season to win Cleveland's East League MVP honors. During his senior year, he accumulated 1,083 yards on 153 carries, and was named all-state. He also ran track, registering a personal best of 13.6 seconds in the high hurdles.

== College career ==
Hancock signed to play with the Tennessee Volunteers in 1978, part of a signing class that included future NFL players Mike Miller, Darryal Wilson, and Terry Daniels. Initially a running back, he switched to wide receiver a few games into the 1978 season. His best game as a freshman came in Tennessee's loss to rival Alabama, in which he caught three passes for 52 yards. He finished the season with seven receptions for 122 yards and a touchdown. He also returned five kickoffs for 77 yards, and two punts for 16 yards.

Hancock entered the 1979 season one of Tennessee's key receiving threats, having caught three passes for 109 yards in the Orange-and-White Game that spring. He finished the regular season with a team-leading 34 catches for 689 yards and four touchdowns, averaging just over 20 yards per catch. His 85-yard touchdown reception in Tennessee's win over Vanderbilt was, at the time, the longest in school history. He had a 41-yard touchdown reception earlier in the game that sparked a Tennessee rally, and finished the game with 163 receiving yards. He caught three passes for 116 yards in Tennessee's 27–22 loss to Purdue in the 1979 Bluebonnet Bowl. As a member of Tennessee's track team, he placed second in the high hurdles at the NCAA Indoor Championships.

Although Tennessee's offense struggled during the 1980 season, Hancock nevertheless caught 33 passes for 580 yards and two touchdowns. He also rushed 17 times (mostly on reverses) for 131 yards and a touchdown. In the fourth quarter of Tennessee's 20–17 loss to Southern Cal, Hancock caught a short throw from Steve Alatorre and outran the Trojan secondary for a 56-yard, game-tying touchdown. He finished the game with 135 receiving yards. In Tennessee's win over Washington State, Hancock caught a 45-yard, third-down pass in the fourth quarter to set up a touchdown and thwart a late rally by the Cougars. In Tennessee's 23–10 win over Georgia Tech, Hancock caught 6 passes for 120 yards, including a 47-yard touchdown.

Going into the 1981 season, Tennessee coach Johnny Majors sought to get the ball to Hancock more often, stating, "everytime he touches the ball, it seems like something good happens." In spite of missing the first three games of the season with a broken foot, Hancock registered 32 catches for 437 yards and 5 touchdowns, and rushed 16 times for 110 yards and a touchdown. In Tennessee's 10–7 win over Auburn, Hancock picked up 21 yards on a reverse to set up the Vols' only touchdown. Two weeks later against Georgia Tech, Hancock caught a 42-yard touchdown pass from Alatorre in the fourth quarter to lead the Vols to a 10–7 win. He caught six passes for 75 yards in Tennessee's loss to Alabama, and caught 9 passes for 60 yards in the Vols' win over Memphis State. In Tennessee's 28–21 win over Wisconsin in the 1981 Garden State Bowl, Hancock registered one of the best-ever postseason performances by a Vol receiver, catching 11 passes for 196 yards and a touchdown. His 11 receptions remains the most ever by a Vol receiver in a bowl game, and his 196 receiving yards is second only to Peerless Price's 199-yard outing in the 1999 BCS National Championship Game.

During his four years at Tennessee, Hancock caught 106 passes for 1,826 yards 12 touchdowns, and rushed 38 times for 262 yards and two touchdowns. As of the 2012 season, his total career receiving yardage was the 10th-highest in school history. Along with teammates Willie Gault, Clyde Duncan and Lenny Taylor, he helped establish Tennessee's reputation as "Wide Receiver U" in the early 1980s. Hancock also helped recruit fellow John Hay alumnus and future All-American receiver Tim McGee to Tennessee in 1982.

== Professional career ==
Hancock was selected by the Kansas City Chiefs in the first round (11th overall) of the 1982 NFL draft. During his rookie year, he scored his first touchdown on a 41-yard reception in the Chiefs' 26–13 loss to San Francisco. His 609 kickoff return yards in 1982 included a long of 68 yards, and his 103 punt return yards included a long of 30 yards.

Hancock's best NFL season, statistically, was the 1983 season, when he caught 37 passes for 584 yards and a touchdown. He had seven catches for 87 yards in the Chiefs' 41–38 loss to San Diego, five catches for 94 yards in the Chiefs' 27–12 loss to Washington, and six catches for 73 yards, including a 45-yard touchdown, in the Chiefs' second loss of the season to the Chargers, 17–14.

Hancock had two strong games to open the 1984 season, catching three passes for 34 yards in the Chiefs' 37–27 win over Pittsburgh, and catching three passes for 109 yards, including a 46-yard touchdown, in the Chiefs' 27–22 win over Cincinnati. His production declined after the third game, however. He finished the season with 217 yards and a touchdown on 10 catches.

During the 1985 season, Hancock caught 15 passes for 286 yards and two touchdowns. He had a 41-yard touchdown reception in the Chiefs' loss to the Raiders, caught three passes for 62 yards in a loss to Houston, had four catches for 55 yards and a touchdown against Pittsburgh, and caught three passes for 79 yards in the Chiefs' win over Indianapolis. He was released after the 1986 season.

== Post-playing career ==
Hancock returned to Knoxville in 1986, and was hired by the Boy Scouts of America to run its inner city scouting program. During his tenure, he recruited over 500 new scouts, 12 of whom became Eagle Scouts. He also worked with UT's Institute of Public Service, a role in which he advised TDOT-certified small businesses on financial planning and bidding. In the early 2000s, he began working for Knox County Schools, initially as a substitute teacher, before obtaining his special education certificate from UT. He currently works as a special education teacher at Bearden Middle School. He has been active with the state's teachers' union, the Tennessee Education Association, serving on the TEA's board of directors, as well as chair of the group's resolution committee.

In 2012, Hancock, a Democrat, ran against the Republican incumbent Steve Hall for the 18th District's seat in the Tennessee House of Representatives. He campaigned on a platform of fostering an environment for small business innovation and expanding technology in schools, and pledged to keep taxes low. In October 2012, he appeared at a campaign stop with his former coach, Johnny Majors. On election day, he captured just 37.5% of the vote in the heavily Republican district.
