= List of Tennessee Volunteers starting quarterbacks =

This is a list of notable Tennessee Volunteers starting quarterbacks and the years they participated on the Tennessee Volunteers football team.

== Starting quarterbacks ==
*	Selected to All conference Team

=== 1971 to present ===
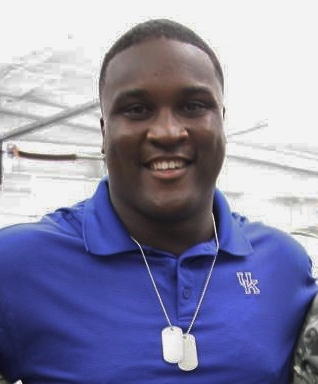
Tee Martin

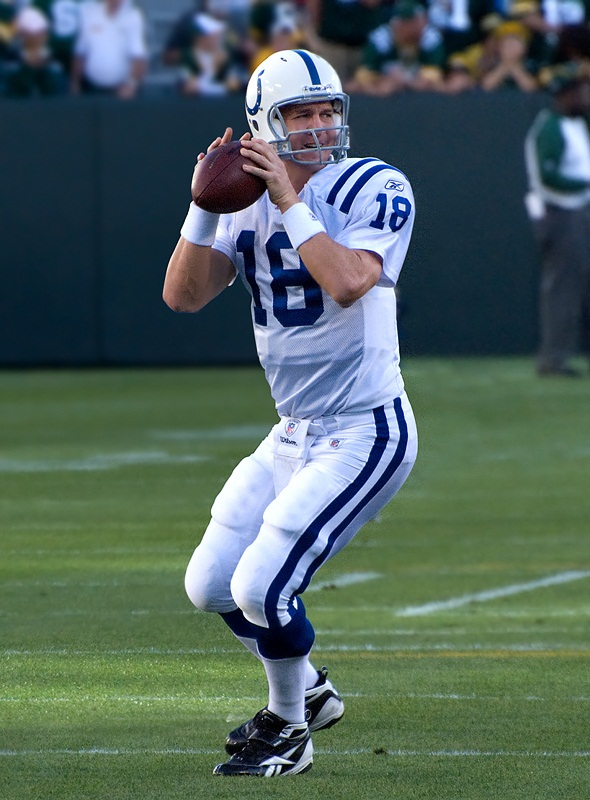
Peyton Manning

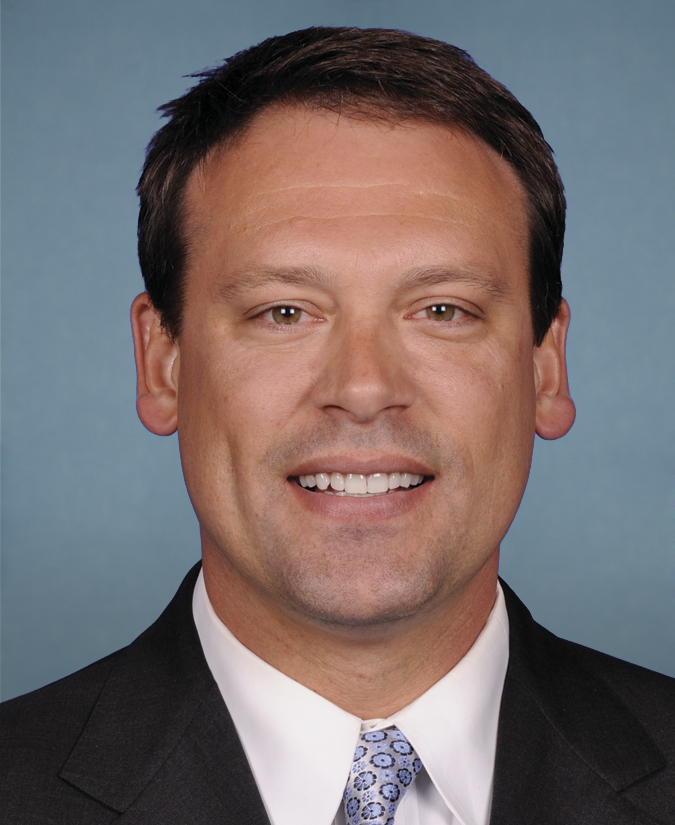
Heath Shuler

The following players were notable quarterbacks for the Tennessee Volunteers since UT joined the Southeastern Conference in 1933.

Year	Name	Class	First career start	GS	Record	Notes	Ref.
2026	Faizon Brandon	Fr.	September 5, 2026	5	4–1		
2026	George MacIntyre	(redshirt) So.	October 10, 2026	5	4–1		
2025	Joey Aguilar	Sr.	August 30th, 2025	12	8-4	Transferred from UCLA after Nico Iamaleava transferred to UCLA; never played for the organization. Last played at Appalachian State in 2024	
2024	Nico Iamaleava	(redshirt) Fr.		13	10–3	Transferred to UCLA	
2023	Joe Milton III	6th Year		12	8–4		
2023	Nico Iamaleava	Fr.	January 1	1	1–0	First career start on January 1, 2024, against #17 Iowa. Citrus Bowl MVP	
2022	Joe Milton III	(redshirt) Sr.		2	2–0	Orange Bowl MVP	
2022	Hendon Hooker	6th Year		11	9–2	SEC Offensive Player of the Year, All-SEC First Team, 5th in Heisman voting	
2021	Joe Milton III	(redshirt) Jr.	September 2	2	1–1		
2021	Hendon Hooker	(redshirt) Sr.	September 18	9	5–4		
2020	Jarrett Guarantano	(redshirt) Sr.		7	2–5	Transferred to Washington State	
2020	Harrison Bailey	Fr.	December 5	3	1–2	Transferred to UNLV	
2019	Jarrett Guarantano	(redshirt) Jr.		7	4–3		
2019	Brian Maurer	Fr.	October 6	4	2–2	Transferred to Stephen F. Austin	
2019	J. T. Shrout	(redshirt) Fr.	November 2	2	2–0	Transferred to Colorado	
2018	Jarrett Guarantano	(redshirt) So.		12	5–7		
2017 (Note: Dormady started the first five games; Guarantano started the remaining six of seven games of the season.)	Jarrett Guarantano	(redshirt) Fr.	October 14	6	1–5		
2017	Quinten Dormady	Jr.	September 4	5	3–2	Transferred to Houston	
2017	Will McBride	Fr.	November 11	1	0–1	Transferred to Lamar	
2016	Joshua Dobbs	Sr.		13	9–4	Music City Bowl MVP, All-SEC Second Team, Drafted 135th overall in the 2017 NFL draft by the Pittsburgh Steelers	
2015	Joshua Dobbs	Jr.		13	9–4		
2014 (Note: Worley started the first seven games; Dobbs started the remaining five of six games of the season.)	Justin Worley	Sr.		7	3–4		
2014	Joshua Dobbs	So.		5	4–1	Taxslayer Bowl MVP	
2014	Nathan Peterman	(redshirt) So.		1	0–1	Transferred to Pittsburgh. Drafted 171st overall in the 2017 NFL draft by the Buffalo Bills	
2013 (Note: Worley started the first six of seven games of the season; Dobbs started the remaining four games.)	Justin Worley	Jr.		7	4–3		
2013	Joshua Dobbs	Fr.	November 2	4	1–3		
2013	Nathan Peterman	(redshirt) Fr.	September 21	1	0–1		
2012	Tyler Bray	Jr.		12	5–7		
2011 (Note: Bray started the first five games and returned last two games of the season.)	Tyler Bray	So.		7	4–3		
2011	Justin Worley	Fr.	October 29	3	1–2		
2011	Matt Simms	Sr.		2	0–2		
2010 (Note: Simms started the first eight games; Bray started the last five games of the season.)	Matt Simms	Jr.	September 4	8	2–6		
2010	Tyler Bray	Fr.	November 6	5	4–1		
2009	Jonathan Crompton	(redshirt) Sr.		13	7–6		
2008 (Note: Crompton started the first four games and returned the last two games of the season.)	Jonathan Crompton	(redshirt) Jr.		6	3–3		
2008	Nick Stephens	(redshirt) Fr.	October 4	6	2–4		
2007	Erik Ainge	Sr.		14	10–4	Played 6 games under the influence of prescription painkillers	
2006 (Note: Ainge started the first eight games and returned the last three games of the season.)	Erik Ainge	Jr.		12	9–3		
2006	Jonathan Crompton	(redshirt) Fr.	November 11	1	0–1		
2005	Erik Ainge	So.		5	4–1		
2005	Rick Clausen	(redshirt) Sr.		6	1–5		
2004	Erik Ainge	Fr.	October 2	6	4–2	SEC Offensive Freshman of the Year	
2004	Rick Clausen	(redshirt) Jr.	November 20	4	3–1	Cotton Bowl Classic Offensive MVP	
2004	Brent Schaeffer	Fr.	September 5	3	3–0	Transferred to the College of the Sequoias, later Ole Miss	
2003	Casey Clausen	Sr.		13	10–3		
2002	Casey Clausen	Jr.		11	7–4		
2002	C.J. Leak	(redshirt) Jr.	October 12	1	0–1		
2002	James Banks	Fr.	November 16	1	1–0		
2001	Casey Clausen	So.		13	11–2	Florida Citrus Bowl MVP	
2000	Casey Clausen	Fr.	October 21	7	6–1		
2000	A.J. Suggs	(redshirt) Fr.	September 16	4	1–3	Transferred to Georgia Tech	
2000	Joey Mathews	So.	September 2	1	1–0		
1999	Tee Martin	Sr.		12	9–3	All-SEC First Team	
1998	Tee Martin	Jr.	September 5	13	13–0	Led Tennessee to the 1998 National Championship. He broke the NCAA record for consecutive completions.	
1997	Peyton Manning	Sr.		13	11–2	1997 Heisman Trophy Runner Up. Davey O'Brien Award. Consensus All-American. SEC Player of the Year. All-SEC First Team. SEC Championship MVP. Florida Citrus Bowl MVP	
1996	Peyton Manning	Jr.		12	10–2	Third Team All-American. All-SEC Second Team.	
1995	Peyton Manning	So.		12	11–1	All-SEC First Team.	
1994	Peyton Manning	Fr.	September 24	8	7–1	SEC Freshman of the Year	
1994	Branndon Stewart	Fr.				Transferred to Texas A&M.	
1994	Todd Helton	Jr.	September 10	3	1–2	Played in 1994 until Peyton Manning took over primary QB duties. Went on to play Major League Baseball.	
1994	Jerry Colquitt	(redshirt) Sr.	September 3	1	0–1		
1993	Heath Shuler	Jr.		12	10–2	1993 Heisman Trophy Runner Up. SEC Player of the Year. All-SEC First Team.	
1992	Heath Shuler	So.	September 5	12	9–3	Hall of Fame Bowl MVP	
1991	Andy Kelly	Sr.		12	9–3		
1990	Andy Kelly	Jr.		13	9–2–2	Cotton Bowl MVP, All-SEC Second Team.	
1989	Andy Kelly	So.	October 21	6	6–0		
1989	Sterling Henton	(redshirt) So.	September 2	6	5–1		
1988	Jeff Francis	Sr.		11	5–6		
1987	Jeff Francis	Jr.		13	10–2–1		
1986	Jeff Francis	So.	September 6	12	7–5	Liberty Bowl MVP	
1985	Daryl Dickey	(redshirt) Sr.		7	6–0–1	Sugar Bowl MVP, became starter after Robinson injury – Team beat Miami in Sugar Bowl	
1985	Tony Robinson	Sr.		5	4–1	In 1985 was considered a Heisman candidate until season ending knee injury.	
1984	Daryl Dickey	(redshirt) Jr.	September 22	1	0–0–1		
1984	Tony Robinson	Jr.	September 1	11	7–4	All-SEC First Team.	
1983	Alan Cockrell	Jr.		12	9–3		
1982	Alan Cockrell	So.		12	6–5–1		
1981	Alan Cockrell	Fr.	September 19	2	2–0		
1981	Steve Alatorre	Sr.		8	6–2	Garden State Bowl MVP	
1981	Jeff Olszewski	Sr.		2	0–2		
1980	Steve Alatorre	Jr.	October 18	6	2–4		
1980	Jeff Olszewski	Jr.	September 6	5	3–2		
1979	Jimmy Streater	Sr.		12	7–5	All-SEC (UPI). Nicknamed the "Sylva Streak"	
1978	Jimmy Streater	Jr.		11	5–5–1		
1977	Jimmy Streater	So.	September 10	9	4–5		
1977	Pat Ryan	Sr.	October 8	2	0–2		
1976	Randy Wallace	Sr.		11	6–5		
1975	Randy Wallace	Jr.	September 14	12	7–5		
1974	Condredge Holloway	Sr.		12	7–3–2		
1973	Condredge Holloway	Jr.		11	7–4	Holloway was one of the first African-American quarterbacks to receive national exposure. His nickname at Tennessee was the "Artful Dodger".	
1972	Condredge Holloway	So.	September 9	11	9–2		
1971	Jim Maxwell	Sr.	October 30	6	6–0		
1971	Phil Pierce	Sr.	October 2	4	3–1		
1971	Dennis Chadwick	Jr.	September 18	2	1–1		

=== 1933 to 1970 ===
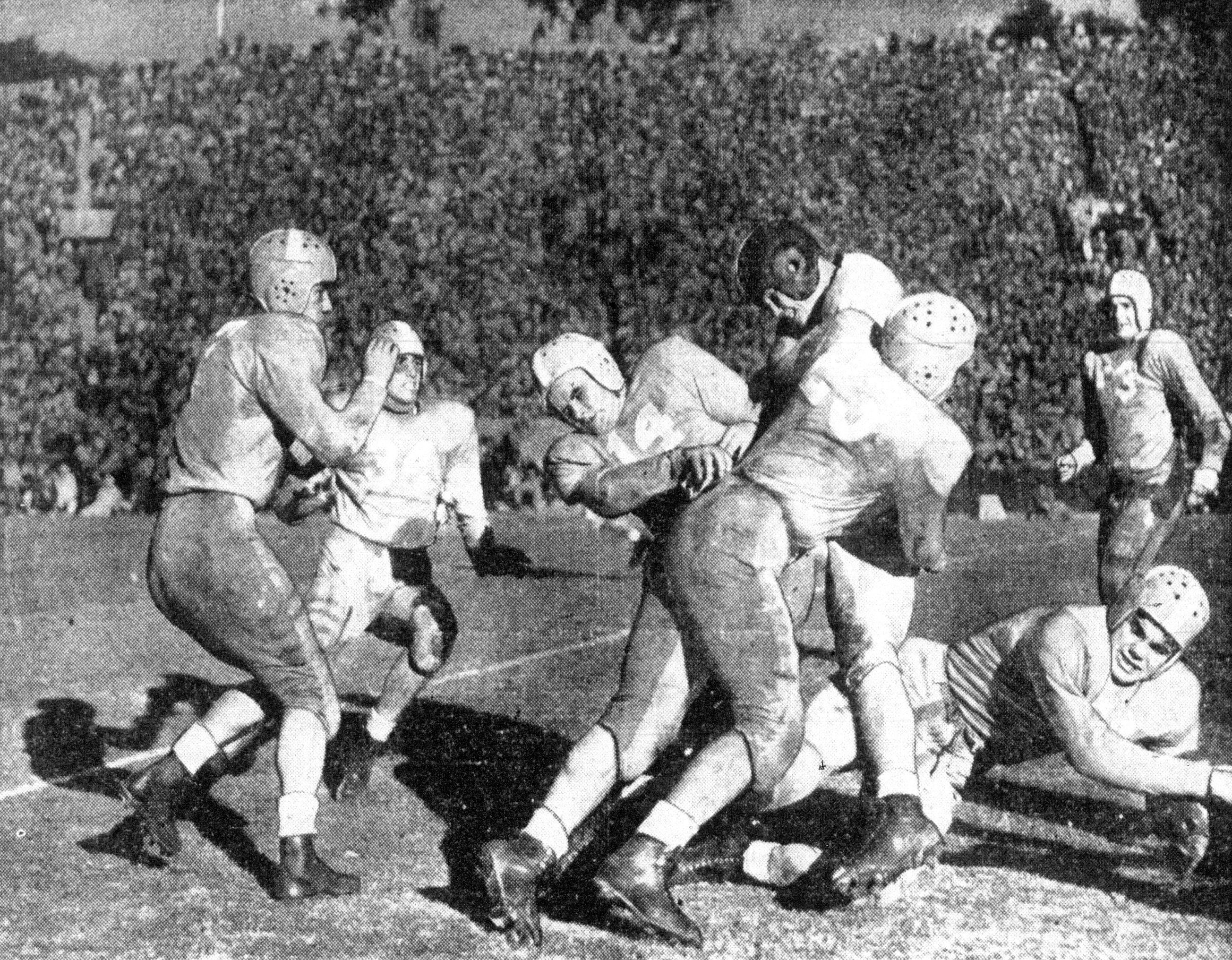
Bill Bevis makes a tackle in the Rose Bowl

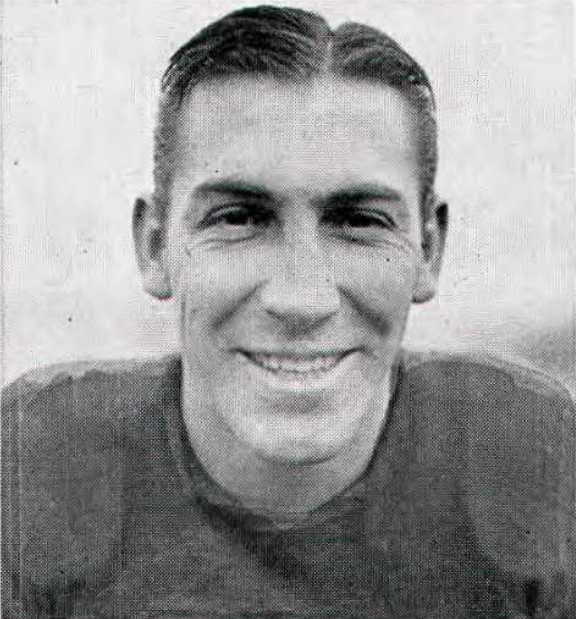
Beattie Feathers

Name	Year	Notes	References
Bobby Scott	1969–1970		
Bubba Wyche	1968		
Dewey Warren	1966–1967		
Charles Fulton	1965		
Art Galiffa	1964–1966		
Mallon Faircloth	1961–1963		
Glenn Glass	1960–1961		
Billy Majors	1958–1960		
Bobby Gordon	1957		
Johnny Majors	1956		
Jimmy Beutel	1954–1955		
Bill Barbish	1953		
Hal Hubbard	1952		
Bill Blackstock	1951		
Jimmy Hahn	1950–1951	Jacobs Blocking Trophy	
Jimmy Hill	1949–1950		
Jack Armstrong	1948		
Orvis Milner	1947	Founder of the UT quarterback club.	
Walter Slater	1946		
Bob Long	1945		
Bill Bevis	1945		
Buzz Warren	1943–1944		
Jim Gaffney	1943	1943 season suspended due to WWII	
Charles Mitchell	1942		
Johnny Butler	1941	Butler wore number 22.	
Van Thompson	1940		
George Cafego	1938–1939	Two-time All-American. Heisman finalist. Number 1 overall pick of 1940 NFL draft.	
Walter Wood	1937		
Phil Dickens	1935–1936		
Charles Vaughn	1934		
Beattie Feathers	1933	SEC Player of the Year	

=== 1922 to 1932 ===
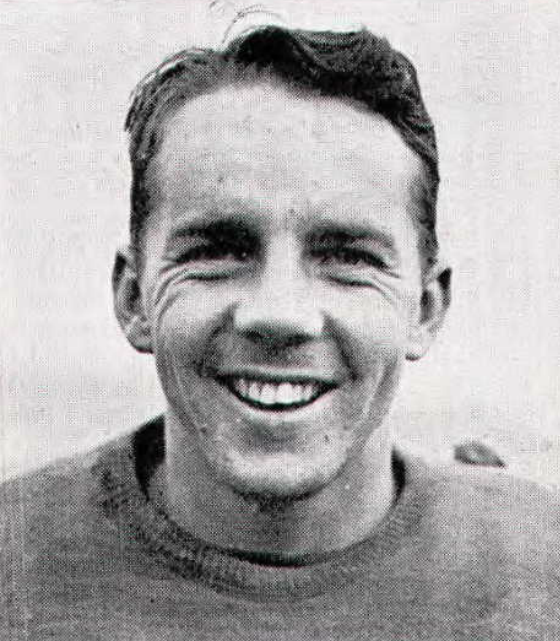
Deke Brackett

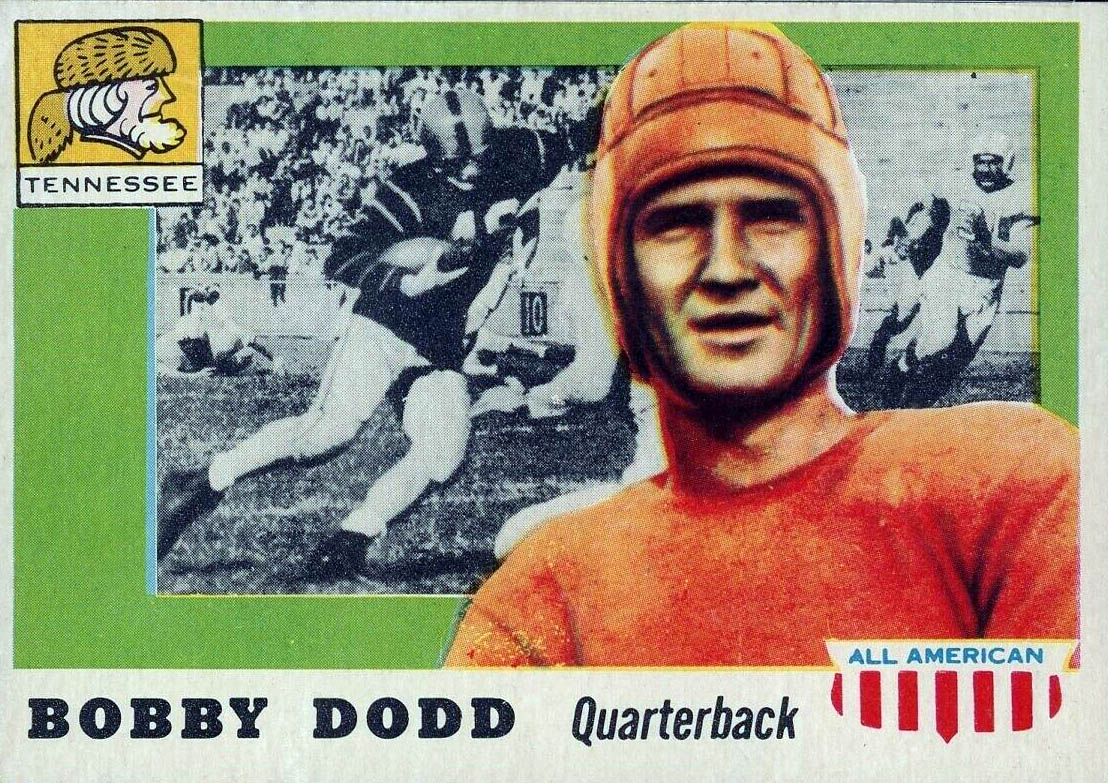
Bobby Dodd

The following quarterbacks were the predominant quarters for the Volunteers each season after the establishment of the Southern Conference until the establishment of the Southeastern Conference.

Name	Years Started	Notability	References
Deke Brackett	1931–1932	Led Tennessee along with Beattie Feathers to 1932 Southern title.	
Bobby Dodd	1928–1930	Twice All-Southern. Later coached Georgia Tech to the 1952 National Championship. One of only three elected to the College Football Hall of Fame as both player and coach.	
Roy Witt	1928		
D. Vincent Tudor	1927–1929		
Jimmy Elmore	1927		
Billy Harkness	1924–1926		
Jimmie Smith	1922		

=== 1896 to 1921 ===
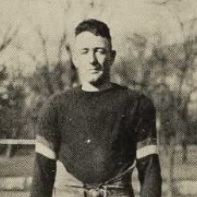
Roe Campbell

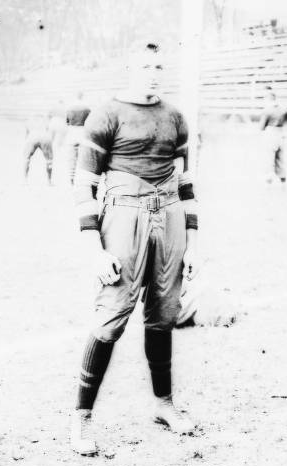
Buck Hatcher

Sax Crawford

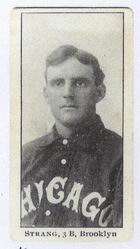
Strang Nicklin

The following quarterbacks were the predominant quarters for the Volunteers each season after the establishment of the Southern Intercollegiate Athletic Association until the establishment of the Southern Conference.

Name	Years Started	Notability	References
Roe Campbell	1921–1924	Awarded the Porter Cup in 1922. Campbell attended Tusculum College before Tennessee, where he is a member of its sports Hall of Fame	
Joe Evans	1920		
Willis McCabe	1919	Won The Porter Cup	
Buck Hatcher	1916	Led the Vols to their second SIAA title. The New York Times ranked him as the season's premier punter.	
Bill May	1914–1915	Led Tennessee to 1914 SIAA title, the first championship of any kind for the program. This season also featured Tennessee's first victory over Vanderbilt	
Red Rainey	1913	All-Southern.	
Rufus Branch	1909–1912		
Chauncey Raulston	1909		
J. C. Loucks	1906–1908		
Walker Leach	1905	Captain of 1908 team, considered the best Tennessee football team yet assembled. As well as Leach and Loucks, the 1908 team featured Hall of Fame lineman Nathan Dougherty.	
T. R. Watkins	1903–1904		
Sax Crawford	1901–1902	The Volunteers won a school record six games in 1902 and beat rivals Sewanee and Georgia Tech. As well as Crawford, the 1902 team featured lineman Nash Buckingham. Crawford also coached Tennessee in 1904, scoring the first ever win over Alabama.	
J. G. Logan	1900		
C. L. Bryan	1899		
Strang Nicklin	1897	Nicklin transferred from UNC to UT in 1896. He was the first UT athlete to play major league baseball and the first to play in a World Series game. His paid baseball participation, together with playing baseball players who were not enrolled, occasioned the blacklisting of Tennessee by the SIAA in 1897.	
David C. Chapman	1894–1896	David Carpenter Chapman served in the Spanish American War and was first president of the Knoxville Rotary Club.	

=== 1891 to 1895 ===
The following players were the predominant quarters for the Volunteers each season the team was a non-conference independent team, following the birth of Tennessee football.

Name	Years Started	Notability	References
Howard Ijams	1891–1893	First Volunteer quarterback to play Vanderbilt.	
