= List of Rhode Island Rams in the NFL draft =

This is a list of Rhode Island Rams football players in the NFL draft.

== Selections ==
Year	Round	Pick	Player	Team	Position
1954	30	352	Pat Abbruzzi	Baltimore Colts	B
1955	13	147	Pat Abbruzzi	Baltimore Colts	B
1955	25	292	Dick Grann	Baltimore Colts	T
1963	14	183	Alan Arbuse	Los Angeles Rams	T
1968	12	308	Howie Small	Minnesota Vikings	C
1968	13	353	Frank Geiselman	Green Bay Packers	WR
1972	5	113	Steve Furness	Pittsburgh Steelers	DE
1974	16	408	Molly McGee	Atlanta Falcons	RB
1977	5	134	Jeff Williams	Atlanta Falcons	G
1978	8	208	Rick Moser	Pittsburgh Steelers	RB
1983	9	232	Rich Pelzer	Philadelphia Eagles	T
1986	7	189	Bob White	New York Jets	T
2020	5	171	Isaiah Coulter	Houston Texans	WR
