= John Rogan (Canadian football) =

American gridiron football player (born 1960)

No. 14, 7
- Position: Quarterback

Personal information
- Born: January 30, 1960 (age 66); New York City, U.S.
- Listed height: 6 ft 1 in (1.85 m)
- Listed weight: 200 lb (91 kg)

Career information
- High school: Chaminade (Mineola, New York)
- College: Yale (1978–1981)
- NFL draft: 1982: undrafted

Career history
- New York Jets (1982)*; Montreal Concordes (1982–1983); Jacksonville Bulls (1984)*; Los Angeles Raiders (1984)*
- * Offseason or practice squad member only

John P. Rogan (born January 30, 1960) is an American former professional football player who was a quarterback for two seasons with the Montreal Concordes of the Canadian Football League (CFL). He played college football for the Yale Bulldogs.

== Early life ==
John P. Rogan was born on January 30, 1960, in New York City. He attended Chaminade High School in Mineola, New York.

== College career ==
Rogan was a member of the Yale Bulldogs of Yale University from 1978 to 1981 and a three-year letterman from 1979 to 1981. He split time with senior Dennis Dunn during his sophomore year in 1979, completing 40 of 96 passes (41.7%) for 686 yards, five touchdowns, and six interceptions while also scoring four rushing touchdowns. Rogan became the team's primary starter in 1980, recording 55 completions on 117 passing attempts (47.0%) for 891 yards, nine touchdowns, and seven interceptions, and two rushing touchdowns. As a senior in 1981, Rogan completed 95 of 192 passes (49.5%) for 1,267 yards, 12 touchdowns, and eight interceptions while also running for four touchdowns. He was an economics/political science major at Yale.

== Professional career ==
After going undrafted in the 1982 NFL draft, Rogan signed with the New York Jets on June 17, 1982. He was released on September 6, 1982.

Rogan signed with the Montreal Concordes of the Canadian Football League on September 9, 1982. He dressed in one game for the Concordes that year but did not record any statistics. Going into the 1983 season, Rogan was expected to be the Concordes' fourth-string quarterback. However, after injuries to Luc Tousignant, inconsistency from Mike Calhoun, and a broken collarbone from projected starter Johnny Evans, Rogan became the team's starter during training camp. He started the team's first game of the season against the Saskatchewan Roughriders but was benched in the second half for the newly-acquired Ron Reeves. Overall, Rogan dressed in the first three games of the season, starting one, and completed 12 of 25 passes (48%) for 108 yards and two interceptions before being released on July 25, 1983.

Rogan was signed by the Jacksonville Bulls of the United States Football League on August 29, 1983. He was released on January 12, 1984.

Rogan signed with the Los Angeles Raiders on March 20, 1984. He was released on July 22, 1984.
