= Willie Gault =

American football player (born 1960)

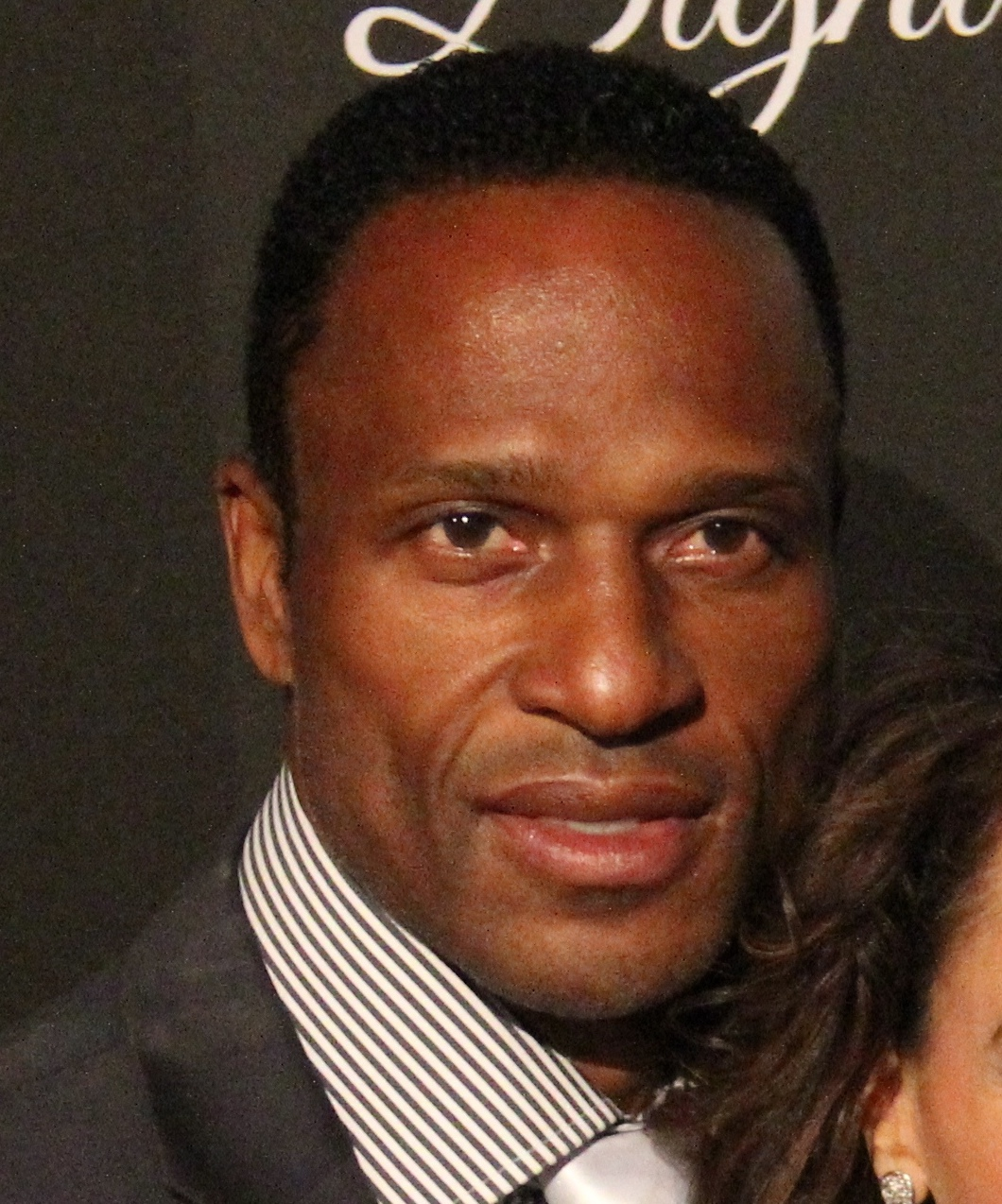
- Gault at the Inaugural Dignity Gala on October 18, 2013

No. 83
- Position: Wide receiver

Personal information
- Born: September 5, 1960 (age 66); Griffin, Georgia, U.S.
- Listed height: 6 ft 0 in (1.83 m)
- Listed weight: 178 lb (81 kg)

Career information
- High school: Griffin
- College: Tennessee
- NFL draft: 1983: 1st round, 18th overall pick

Career history
- Chicago Bears (1983–1987); Los Angeles Raiders (1988–1993)

Awards and highlights
- Super Bowl champion (XX); PFWA All-Rookie Team (1983); 100 greatest Bears of All-Time; First-team All-American (1982); First-team All-SEC (1982)

Career NFL statistics
- Receptions: 333
- Receiving yards: 6,635
- Touchdowns: 44
- Kickoff returns: 45
- Kickoff return yards: 1,088
- Stats at Pro Football Reference

Willie James Gault (born September 5, 1960) is an American former professional football player who was a wide receiver in the National Football League (NFL) for 11 seasons with the Chicago Bears and Los Angeles Raiders. Considered one of the fastest NFL players of all time, Gault was a member of the Bears team that won Super Bowl XX. He was also a member of the U.S. Olympic team that boycotted the 1980 Olympics.

Gault played college football for the Tennessee Volunteers from 1979 to 1982. He led the Vols in all-purpose yardage as a sophomore, junior and senior, and was named to the All-American team in 1982. He still holds numerous school kickoff return records.

Gault married his high school sweetheart, writer/author/actress Dainnese Mathis Gault in 1983. They were married from 1983 to 2002 and have two children. His youngest child is rising painter, artist, Gabe Gault

Gault is currently pursuing a career as an actor. He also remains active in masters athletics, setting world masters records in the 100 meter and 200 meter dash for the 45–49, the 50–54, and the 55–59 age groups.

== Early life ==
Gault was born and raised in Griffin, Georgia. He was named for his mother, Willie Mae. Both of his parents worked in a textile mill. He later recalled that his classmates considered him a "teacher's pet".

Gault played football and ran track for Griffin High School. He had two receptions for 19 yards in Griffin's 7–7 tie against Valdosta in the AAAA State Championship Game during his junior year. He had a 48-yard touchdown catch for the North team in the 1979 GACA North/South Game (a preseason all-star game). During his senior year, he caught 33 passes and scored seven touchdowns, averaging 19 yards per catch. He was named All-State following his junior and senior seasons.

== University of Tennessee ==
=== Football ===
Gault played football at the University of Tennessee during an era when the school was acquiring its reputation as "Wide Receiver U." Three of Gault's teammates—Anthony Hancock, Clyde Duncan, and Tim McGee—would be first-round NFL Draft picks, and three others—Mike Miller, Lenny Taylor and Darryal Wilson—would be drafted in later rounds. During his four years at UT, Gault caught 89 passes for 1,482 yards and 10 touchdowns, returned 78 kickoffs for 1,854 yards and four touchdowns, and returned 78 punts for 659 yards and a touchdown.

During the regular season of his freshman year in 1979, Gault caught three passes for 95 yards, including a 69-yard touchdown in Tennessee's 51–18 win over Utah. He had a team-leading four catches for 22 yards in the Vols' 27–22 loss to Purdue in the 1979 Bluebonnet Bowl.

Gault's breakout year came during the 1980 season. Though he caught a relatively modest 14 passes for 240 yards while splitting time with Miller at receiver, he returned 24 kickoffs for 662 yards, and tied a national single-season record by returning three kickoffs for touchdowns. He returned a kickoff 100 yards for a touchdown to provide Tennessee's lone score in the team's 30–6 loss to Pittsburgh. He then returned kickoffs for touchdowns in back-to-back games at the end of the season: a 92-yarder against Kentucky and a 98-yarder against Vanderbilt. Calling the latter play for the Vol Network, long-time broadcaster John Ward shouted, "Ladies and gentlemen, Willie Gault has run all the way to the State Capitol." Gault added a 48-yard touchdown catch in the Kentucky win.

During his junior year in 1981, Gault caught 22 passes for 479 yards and four touchdowns while continuing to split time with Miller. He added to his reputation as a dangerous return man, with 28 kickoff returns for 606 yards, and 31 punt returns for 381 yards and a touchdown. In Tennessee's 28–20 win over Ole Miss, Gault had a 54-yard kickoff return, a 66-yard punt return for a touchdown, and a 49-yard punt return. He returned a punt 66 yards for an apparent touchdown against Auburn, but it was called back on a penalty. He caught a 75-yard touchdown pass in the Vols' loss to Alabama, and registered a 49-yard touchdown catch against Memphis State. He had 217 receiving yards against Vanderbilt, including an 80-yard touchdown catch and a 72-yard reception. In Tennessee's 28–21 win over Wisconsin in the 1981 Garden State Bowl, Gault returned a kickoff 87 yards for the Vols' first touchdown of the game.

Gault entered his senior year a Preseason All-American. As part of an explosive receiving corps that included Mike Miller, Lenny Taylor and Darryal Wilson, Gault registered a team-leading 50 catches for 668 yards and four touchdowns. He also registered 23 kickoff returns for 549 yards and a touchdown, and 20 punt returns for 145 yards. He caught touchdown passes of 78 yards and 38 yards in Tennessee's 24–14 loss to Auburn, and returned a kickoff 96 yards for a touchdown in the Vols' 24–24 tie against LSU. Gault caught a 52-yard touchdown pass in Tennessee's 35–28 win over Alabama, helping the Vols break an 11-year losing streak to the Tide. He caught a 19-yard touchdown pass in Tennessee's 28–22 loss to Iowa in the 1982 Peach Bowl. He was named an All-American at the end of the season.

As of the 2012 season, Gault's 1,854 kickoff return yards and 2,513 total return yards remain school records. His 27.6 yards per kickoff return in 1980 and his 987 total return yards in 1981 remain school single-season records. Gault's mark of 4,035 career all-purpose yards is the second-highest tally in school history, trailing only Stanley Morgan's 4,642. His 273 all-purpose yards against Auburn in 1982 and 268 against Vanderbilt in 1981 remain the second and third-highest single game tallies in school history, trailing only Chuck Webb's 294 yards in the 1989 Ole Miss game.

=== Track and field ===
Willie Gault
Medal record

Men's athletics

Representing United States

Olympic Boycott Games
Gold medal – first place	1980 Philadelphia	4 × 100 m relay
Bronze medal – third place	1980 Philadelphia	100 m

World Championships
Gold medal – first place	1983 Helsinki	4 × 100 m relay
Bronze medal – third place	1983 Helsinki	110 m hurdles

Summer Universiade
Gold medal – first place	1983 Edmonton	4 x 100 m relay
Silver medal – second place	1983 Edmonton	110 m hurdles

Gault qualified for the 1980 U.S. Olympic team and would have participated in the 1980 Summer Olympics in Moscow had the United States not boycotted the event. He was one of 461 athletes to receive a Congressional Gold Medal. Gault set a record in the 110-meter high hurdles at the SEC track and field championships in May 1981. At the 1982 SEC championships, he again set the 110-meter high hurdles record, and won the Commissioner's Trophy for the highest overall score. He won the 60-yard hurdles event at the 1983 SEC indoor championships with a time of 7.05. At the 1983 NCAA Indoor Track and Field Championships, Gault won the 60-yard high hurdles and the 60-yard dash with times of 6.98 and 6.18, respectively. At the 1983 NCAA outdoor championships, Gault placed third behind Roger Kingdom and Reggie Towns in the 110-meter high hurdles.

Gault was part of a world record-setting 4 × 100 meter relay team (1. Emmit King, 2. Willie Gault, 3. Calvin Smith, 4. Carl Lewis) at the 1983 World Championships. He also competed in the 110 meter hurdles and attended the Liberty Bell Classic, where he won a bronze medal in the 100 meter race. He made the 1988 Winter Olympics bobsledding team as an alternate. His official personal bests are 13.26 seconds in the 110 meter hurdles and 10.10 seconds in the 100 meters.

==== Personal bests ====
Event	Time (seconds)	Venue	Date
100 meters	10.10A	Provo, Utah	June 5, 1982
200 meters	20.68	Tempe, Arizona	March 20, 1982

Event	Time (seconds)	Venue	Date
50 metres hurdles	6.56	Los Angeles, California	February 15, 1992
55 metres hurdles	6.96	Dallas, Texas	February 5, 1983
60 metres hurdles	7.67	Louisville, Kentucky	January 29, 1981
110 metres hurdles	13.26	Indianapolis, Indiana	July 25, 1982

== Professional football career ==
Gault was selected by the Chicago Bears in the first round (18th-overall pick) in the 1983 NFL draft, and had an immediate impact during his rookie season. He caught four passes for 103 yards and a touchdown in the Bears' loss to New Orleans, five passes for 130 yards and a touchdown in the Bears' loss to Baltimore, and four passes for 129 yards and an 87-yard touchdown in the Bears' loss to Green Bay. Gault was the prototypical "speed merchant", meaning his greatest asset was his pure straight-line swiftness.

During the Bears' dominant 1985 season, Gault caught 33 passes for a team-leading 704 yards His best game of the season came in the Bears' 33–24 win over Minnesota, when he caught six passes for 146 yards, including a 70-yard touchdown. In the Bears' 46–10 victory over New England in Super Bowl XX, Gault had four receptions for a game-leading 129 yards, and four kickoff returns for 49 yards. At the end of the 1985 regular season, Gault helped organize teammates to perform the "Super Bowl Shuffle", a rap song and music video that raised money for a local charity. He sang one verse in the song.

By the 1986 season, friction had developed between Gault and Bears quarterback Jim McMahon. In his autobiography published that year, McMahon suggested that Gault was undependable, and only put forth his best effort if the game was on national television. Gault stated in an interview with Sports Illustrated that he wasn't sure why McMahon seemed hesitant to throw it to him more often (the Sports Illustrated article's author, Bruce Newman, suggested that Gault didn't get as many throws because he was frequently double-teamed). In spite of this squabble, Gault finished the 1986 season with 42 catches for 818 yards, including 7 catches for 174 yards against Cincinnati, and four catches for 116 yards against Tampa Bay.

Prior to the 1988 season, Gault was traded to the Los Angeles Raiders. He caught four passes for 102 yards in the Raiders' loss to Cincinnati on October 2, 1988. He caught four passes for 131 yards and a touchdown in the 1989 season opener against San Diego, and had 147 yards on just two catches in the Raiders' win over Cincinnati on November 5, 1989. He caught four passes for 103 yards to help the Raiders defeat his former team on September 30, 1990. In the 1991 season, he had 20 receptions for 346 yards and four touchdowns. In the 1992 season, he had 27 receptions for 508 yards and five touchdowns. The Raiders did not re-sign Gault following the 1993 season.

In spite of his speed, Gault never won the NFL's "Fastest Man" competition over 60 yards (outdoors). He placed second behind frequent winner Darrell Green in 1986, having defeated fellow Olympic sprinter Ron Brown in the semifinals. In the 1990 competition, Gault again placed second, losing to Brown in the finals (Green was recovering from an injury and didn't compete). Green (a cornerback) would frequently cover Gault when their respective teams played. In the Bears' 23–19 win over Washington in the 1984 playoffs, Gault beat Green for a 75-yard touchdown reception after getting held without a catch in the first half. In the Bears' loss to the Redskins in the 1986 playoffs, Gault had five catches for 82 yards, including a 50-yard touchdown, while going head to head with Green. In the Redskins' 21–17 win over the Bears in the 1987 playoffs, Green held Gault without a catch before leaving the game with an injury. In the Raiders' 21–20 win over the Redskins in 1992, Gault went without a reception for most of the game before beating Green for a 50-yard catch that set up the winning touchdown.

Gault won the 1989 and 1990 Superstars competitions.

Gault finished his 11 NFL seasons with 333 receptions for 6,635 yards. He also returned 9 punts for 60 yards, rushed for 154 yards, returned 45 kickoffs for 1,088 yards, and scored 45 touchdowns (44 receiving and 1 kickoff return).

== NFL career statistics ==
Legend
**Bold**	Career high

Year	Team	GP	Receiving						Kickoff returns				
Year	Team	GP	Rec	Yds	Y/G	Avg	Lng	TD	KR	Yds	Avg	Lng	TD
1983	CHI	**16**	40	836	52.2	20.9	**87**	**8**	13	276	21.2	38	0
1984	CHI	**16**	34	587	36.7	17.3	61	6	1	12	12.0	12	0
1985	CHI	**16**	33	704	44.0	21.3	70	1	**22**	**577**	26.2	**99**	**1**
1986	CHI	**16**	42	818	51.1	19.5	53	5	1	20	20.0	20	0
1987	CHI	12	35	705	58.8	20.1	56	7	0	0	0.0	0	0
1988	LA	15	16	392	26.1	24.5	57	2	0	0	0.0	0	0
1989	LA	**16**	28	690	43.1	**24.6**	84	4	1	16	16.0	16	0
1990	LA	**16**	**50**	**985**	**61.6**	19.7	68	3	0	0	0.0	0	0
1991	LA	**16**	20	346	21.6	17.3	59	4	0	0	0.0	0	0
1992	LA	**16**	27	508	31.8	18.8	53	4	0	0	0.0	0	0
1993	LA	15	8	64	4.3	8.0	12	0	7	187	**26.7**	60	0
Career		170	333	6,635	39.0	19.9	87	44	45	1,088	24.2	99	1

== After retiring as a player ==
Gault retired in the early 1990s and is pursuing an acting career in Hollywood. He portrayed Willie the Sweeper in the NBC series The Pretender. Willie also had an appearance on the sitcom Still Standing playing himself as the father of Tina's friend. He had a few appearances on Ned's Declassified School Survival Guide playing himself alongside sportscaster Van Earl Wright and most recently was featured in the series finale. He also was in an episode of MTV's Parental Control. In Season 4 Episode 8 of Friday Night Lights, the Dillon Lions radio color-man is named Willie Gault as a tribute.

Gault joined other members of the 1985 Chicago Bears in resurrecting the Super Bowl Shuffle in a Boost Mobile commercial for Super Bowl XLIV.

Gault has been active at the highest levels of Masters athletics. On June 24, 2006, Gault set a world record of 10.72 seconds in the master's 100 meters, in the division for athletes aged 45 to 49. On April 26, 2008, Gault (at age 47) set a new world record of 21.80 seconds in the M45-49 age-group for 200m. In May 2011, he set world records for the 50–54 age group in the 100-meter (10.88) and 200-meter (22.44) dashes.

In April 2016, Gault was ordered to pay $206,571 to settle a Securities and Exchange Commission lawsuit regarding his actions in a scheme to inflate share prices of the medical device company Heart Tronics Inc, for which he had been co-CEO. Gault was cleared of the most serious fraud charges.

In November 2016, Gault was inducted into the 2017 class of the Tennessee Sports Hall of Fame.

Gault was inducted into the Georgia Sports Hall of Fame, in Macon, Georgia, as a member of the 2017 class.

Gault was inducted into the USATF Masters Hall of Fame in 2019.

== Filmography ==
Year	Title	Role	Other notes
1988	Sporting Chance	Football Player	TV movie
1990s	Tales from the crypt (TV series)	Police Officer	Episode:"Two for the show"
1992	Bodies of Evidence (TV series)	Melissa Thompson	Episode:"Nearest and Dearest "
1993	In the Heat of the Night (TV series)	Troy Davis	Episode:"Singin' the Blues"
1996	Hangin' with Mr. Cooper (TV series)	Clifford	Episode:"True Confessions"
1996	Baywatch (TV series)		Season 7 Episode 5
1997–2000	The Pretender (TV series)	Willie the Sweeper	Recurring; 19 Episodes
1997	Grounded for Life (TV series)	Hugh	Episode:"Don't Fear the Reefer"
2004	Still Standing (TV series)	Himself	Episode:"Still Champions"
2021	Family Reunion (TV series)	Himself	Episode: Remember Mazzi's First Love?
