= Ron Reeves (gridiron football) =

American gridiron football player (born 1960)

No. 11, 15
- Position: Quarterback

Personal information
- Born: March 4, 1960 (age 66); Lubbock, Texas, U.S.
- Listed height: 6 ft 2 in (1.88 m)
- Listed weight: 215 lb (98 kg)

Career information
- High school: Lubbock (TX) Monterey
- College: Texas Tech
- NFL draft: 1982: 10th round, 261st overall pick

Career history
- Houston Oilers (1982)*; Calgary Stampeders (1983)*; Montreal Concordes (1983); Denver Gold (1984); Chicago Blitz (1984); New Jersey Generals (1985)
- * Offseason or practice squad member only

Ron Reeves (born March 4, 1960) is an American former professional football quarterback who played two seasons in the United States Football League (USFL) with the Denver Gold, Chicago Blitz and New Jersey Generals. He was selected by the Houston Oilers in the tenth round of the 1982 NFL draft. He played college football at Texas Tech University and attended Monterey High School in Lubbock, Texas. Reeves was also a member of the Calgary Stampeders and Montreal Concordes of the Canadian Football League (CFL).

== Early life ==
Reeves played high school football for the Monterey High School Plainsmen, starting three years on the team. He was a middle linebacker his sophomore year, leading the team in tackles. He converted to quarterback his junior season. Reeves was City player of the year and a 2nd team All-State selection in 1977. He was also quarterback in both the THSCA All-Star Game and the Oil Bowl. He also played baseball for the Plainsmen. Reeves was a pitcher on the Monterey Baseball Team and was named City Player of the year. He was also an All-State selection on the 1978 team that became State Championship Runners-up. He played in the THSBCA All-Star game and recorded the highest winning percentage of all time at Monterey with a 30–3 record, or 90.99%. Reeves was inducted into the Lubbock Independent School District Athletic Hall of Honor in 2013.

Reeves was drafted to play baseball for the Cleveland Indians with the 778th pick in the 1978 Major League Baseball draft but instead chose to accept an athletic scholarship to play football at Texas Tech University.

== College career ==
Reeves was a four-year stater for the Texas Tech Red Raiders from 1978 to 1981. He was named the SWC Newcomer of the Year his freshman year and was also 2nd team All-Conference quarterback, an honor he garnered again in 1980. In 1981, Reeves received the SWC Sportsmanship Award and the Dell Morgan Courage Award. He set Texas Tech career records in yards, touchdowns and completions. He compiled 4,688 yards and 31 touchdowns on 352 passing attempts during his college career. He was inducted into the Texas Tech Athletic Hall of Honor in 2007.

== Professional career ==
Reeves was selected by the Houston Oilers in the tenth round with the 261st pick of the 1982 NFL draft. He was released by the Oilers after the second game of the 1982 season.

Reeves signed with the Calgary Stampeders for the 1983 season. He was released by the Stampeders before the start of the season.

Reeves was signed by the Montreal Concordes in June 1983. He entered the first game of the season in relief of John Rogan and started the next game. He helped the Concordes win their first game of the season on July 16, recording four passing touchdowns in a come from behind victory over the Ottawa Rough Riders. He was released by the Concordes in September 1983 after quarterback Johnny Evans, who was injured before the season began, returned.

Reeves played in the United States Football League (USFL) with the Denver Gold in 1984, the Chicago Blitz in 1984, and the New Jersey Generals in 1985.
