= John Bowman (Canadian football) =

American gridiron football player and coach (born 1982)

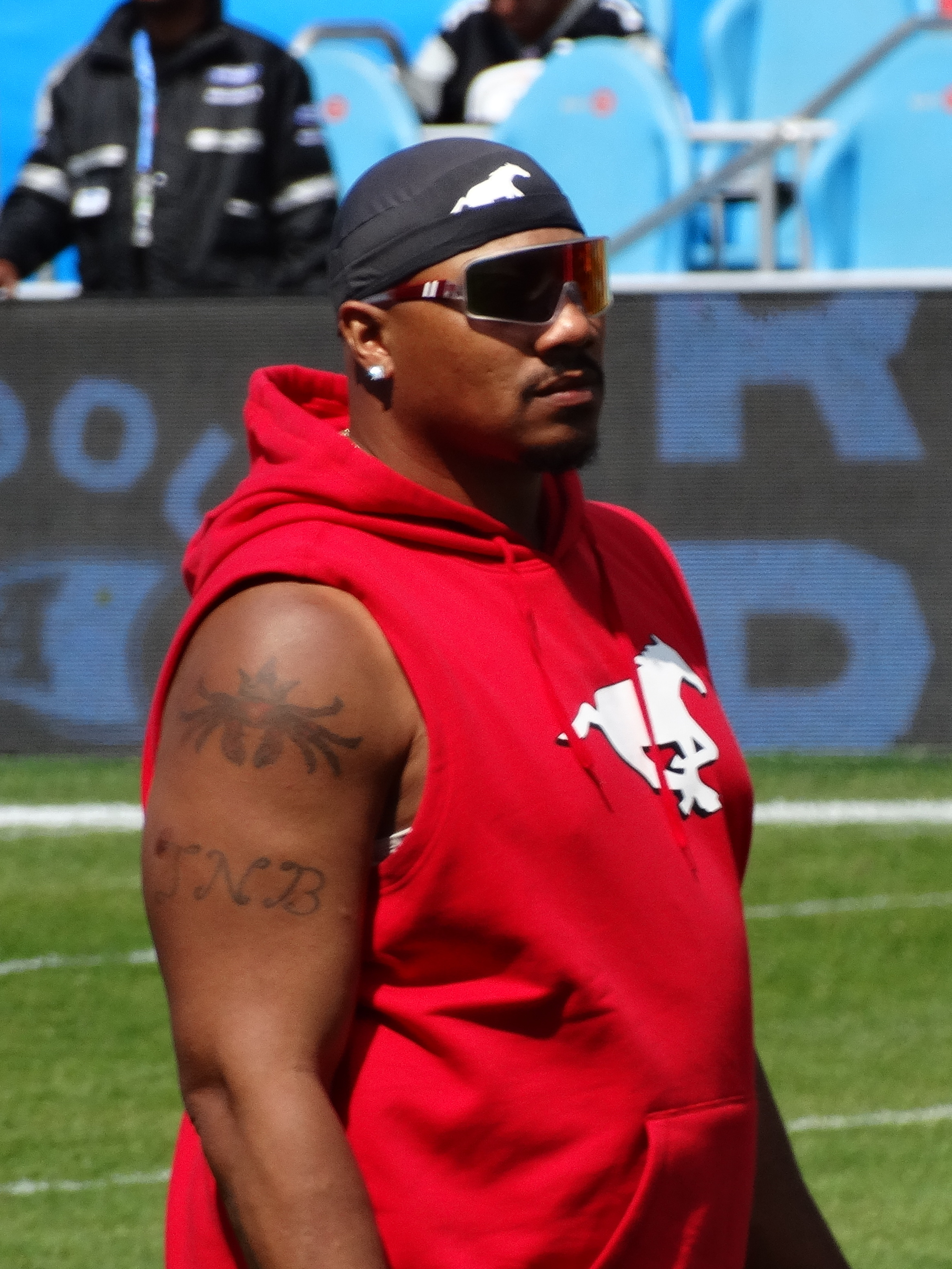
- Bowman with the Calgary Stampeders in 2025

Calgary Stampeders
- Title: Defensive line coach

Personal information
- Born: July 19, 1982 (age 44); Brooklyn, New York, U.S.
- Listed height: 6 ft 3 in (1.91 m)
- Listed weight: 255 lb (116 kg)

Career information
- Position: Defensive end (No. 7)
- College: Wingate
- NFL draft: 2005: undrafted

Career history

Playing
- 2005: Daytona Beach Hawgs
- 2005: Sioux City Bandits
- 2006: Rome Renegades
- 2006–2020: Montreal Alouettes

Coaching
- 2022–2024: BC Lions (DL)
- 2025–present: Calgary Stampeders (DL)

Awards and highlights
- 2× Grey Cup champion (2009, 2010); 2× CFL All-Star (2010, 2015); 9× CFL East All-Star (2009–2010, 2012–2015, 2017–2019)
- Stats at CFL.ca
- Canadian Football Hall of Fame (Class of 2023)

John Bowman (born July 19, 1982) is an American former professional football defensive end who played 14 seasons for the Montreal Alouettes of the Canadian Football League (CFL). He is currently the defensive line coach for the Calgary Stampeders of the CFL. He is a two-time Grey Cup champion after winning in 2009 and 2010 and was named a CFL All-Star twice and a Divisional All-Star nine times. Bowman is the Alouettes' all-time leader in sacks with 134 in his career.

== Playing career ==
=== Early career ===
Bowman played for perennial North Carolina powerhouse Richmond Senior High School in Rockingham, NC. Although a small school, this school produced a fair number of professional athletes to the National Football League. Bowman played college football for Wingate. John Bowman was a Don Hansen's Football Gazette All-American following the 2003 season. An All-SAC selection the same year, Bowman was fourth in the NCAA Division II in quarterback sacks (1.2/game) as a senior. His football coaches at Wingate were current head coach Joe Reich and Reich's predecessor, Bob Brush. Bowman is a member of the Wingate Sports Hall of Fame and the South Atlantic Conference Hall of Fame.

In 2005, Bowman signed with the Daytona Beach Hawgs of the National Indoor Football League. After the Hawgs became suspended from the postseason, Bowman signed with the Sioux City Bandits of United Indoor Football. Following the 2005 season Bowman signed with the NIFL's Rome Renegades.

=== Montreal Alouettes ===
In 2006, Bowman signed with the Montreal Alouettes of the Canadian Football League (CFL). By his second season in the league, Bowman had established himself as one of the CFL's best pass rushers. From 2009-2011, Bowman had 3 continuous seasons producing double digit sacks, recording 12 each year. From 2013-2016, Bowman had another double digit streak, with 11, 12, 19, and 10 sacks by year. Entering his 8th season as an Alouette, at the age of 30, Montreal extended his contract for three more seasons. Bowman suffered a partially torn bicep in Week 8 of the 2018 season. He returned and produced a 5 sack effort in his final season, giving Bowman a career total of 126. During 214 career games, Bowman also accumulated 406 tackles, 31 forced fumbles, and one touchdown, which Bowman scored in what was announced as his final home game in the CFL. However, Bowman re-signed with Montreal in February 2019. He produced another quality season, with 8 sacks, 45 tackles, another forced fumble, and his first career interception. Bowman was named a division All-Star yet again, and helped Montreal return to the playoffs for the first time in 4 seasons. On February 5, 2021, following a cancelled 2020 season the Alouettes announced that they would not be re-signing Bowman for the 2021 season. He was released on February 16, 2021.

During his 14 seasons, Bowman was named a CFL-East All-Star on nine occasions, and a CFL All-Star twice, in addition to winning a pair of Grey Cup games under head coach Marc Trestman. He is the Alouettes franchise leader with 134-career sacks, and sits sixth all-time in the CFL.

Bowman was announced as a member of the Canadian Football Hall of Fame 2023 class on March 16, 2023, in his first year of eligibility.

== Coaching career ==
On January 17, 2022, it was announced that Bowman had joined the BC Lions to serve as the team's defensive line coach. He served in that capacity for three seasons.

Bowman was named the defensive line coach for the Calgary Stampeders on December 16, 2024.
