= Davis Alexander =

American gridiron football player (born 1998)

- Alexander with the Montreal Alouettes in 2026

No. 10 – Montreal Alouettes
- Position: Quarterback
- Roster status: Active
- CFL status: American

Personal information
- Born: October 20, 1998 (age 28); Gig Harbor, Washington, U.S.
- Listed height: 6 ft 0 in (1.83 m)
- Listed weight: 210 lb (95 kg)

Career information
- High school: Gig Harbor
- College: Portland State (2016–2021)
- NFL draft: 2022: undrafted

Career history
- Montreal Alouettes (2022–present)

Awards and highlights
- CFL's Most Outstanding Player Award (2026); Grey Cup champion (2023); CFL East All-Star (2026); CFL records: Most consecutive pass attempts without an interception: 356; Most consecutive wins to start a career: 13

Career CFL statistics as of 2026
- Passing completions: 657
- Passing attempts: 917
- TD–INT: 51–10
- Passing yards: 8,773
- Rushing yards: 438
- Rushing touchdowns: 6
- Stats at CFL.ca

Davis Alexander (born October 20, 1998) is an American professional football quarterback for the Montreal Alouettes of the Canadian Football League (CFL). He played college football at Portland State. Alexander won a Grey Cup in 2023 as a back-up. In 2026, he was named the CFL's Most Outstanding Player Award. As of the 2026 season, he holds the CFL record for most consecutive wins to start a career (13) and most consecutive pass attempts without an interception (356).

== Early life ==
Alexander was born to parents Matt and Natalie Alexander and has one brother. He grew up in Gig Harbor, Washington and graduated from Gig Harbor High School.

== College career ==
Alexander played college football for the Portland State Vikings from 2016 to 2021. At Portland State, he started for four of his five post redshirt seasons, throwing 63 touchdowns and 31 interceptions. He finished his career behind Neil Lomax in almost every statistical category for quarterbacks in team history. At Portland State, he majored in social innovation and social entrepreneurship.

== Professional career ==
Pre-draft measurables
Height	Weight
5 ft 11 1/4 in (1.81 m)	195 lb (88 kg)
Values from Pro Day

Alexander signed with the Montreal Alouettes on February 7, 2022. During the final preseason game against the Ottawa Redblacks, he drove the team 71 yards for a 27–26 win. Following training camp, he began the season on the practice roster, but was elevated to the active roster on June 23, 2022, against the Saskatchewan Roughriders, where he dressed in his first professional game. He reverted to the practice roster after Vernon Adams was moved back to the active roster in a backup capacity. Following Adam's move back to the injured list and subsequent trade to the BC Lions, Alexander became the team's third-string quarterback behind Trevor Harris and Dominique Davis, and dressed in the last 12 regular season games. He played as the team's primary backup in the final game of the regular season behind Davis, where he also saw his first real playing time. In that game, Alexander completed eight of 13 pass attempts for 89 yards and an interception. He also had five carries for 22 yards and his first professional touchdown. He also dressed in both post-season games that year.

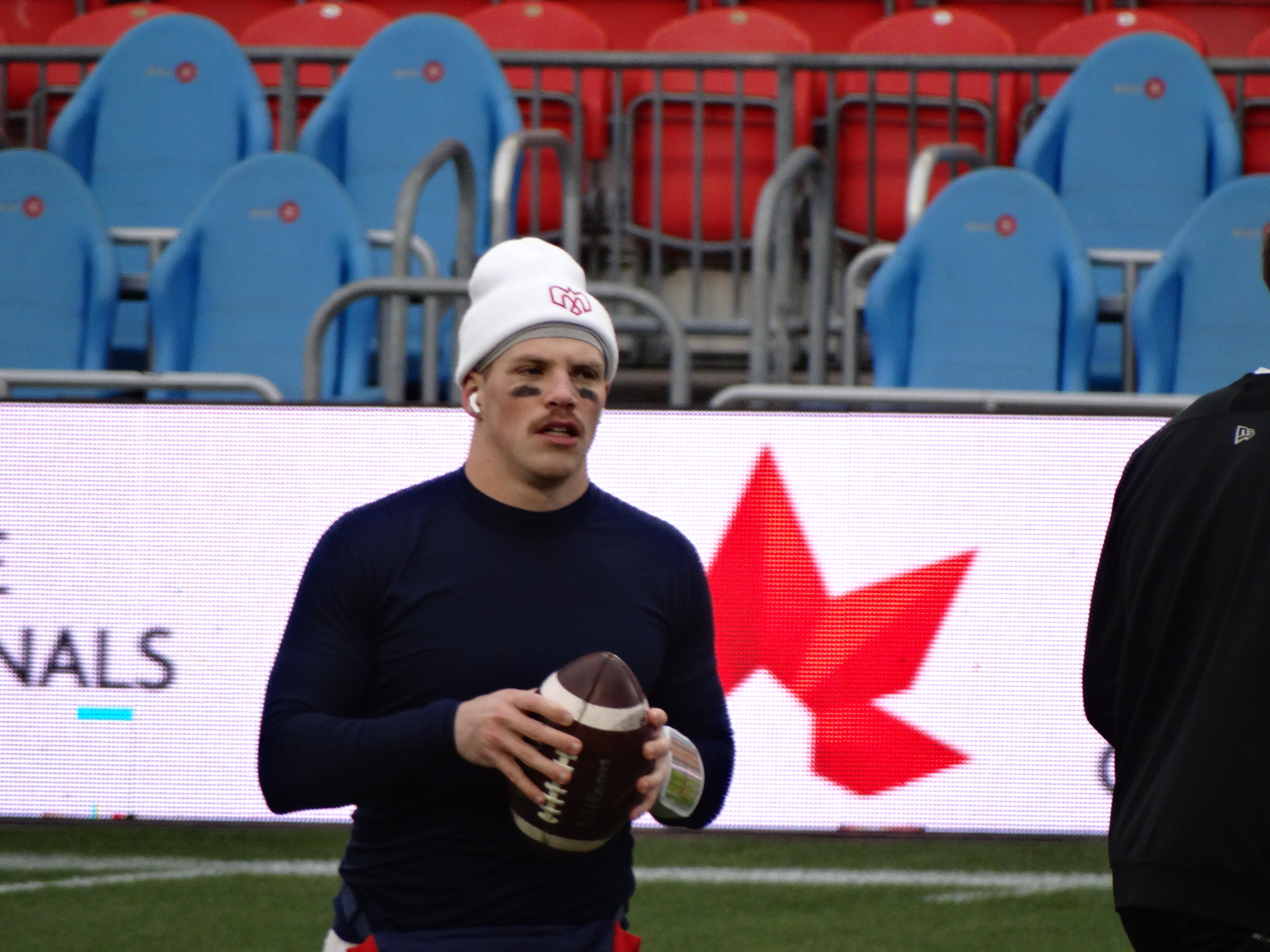
Alexander in 2023

In 2023, Alexander dressed in all 18 regular season games as the backup quarterback, primarily as the third-string quarterback after the team signed Caleb Evans in the offseason and was the primary backup when the team's new starter, Cody Fajardo, was injured mid-season. He completed six of eight pass attempts for 56 yards and one rush attempt for zero yards, primarily in the final game of the regular season with the team's standing already decided. He dressed in all three post-season games for the Alouettes that year and while he did not record any statistics, he shared in the team's championship victory over the Winnipeg Blue Bombers in the 110th Grey Cup.

Alexander began the 2024 season as the third-string quarterback again, but was elevated to the backup role for the week 8 game against the Roughriders following an injury to Fajardo. After Evans led the Alouettes to 74 yards of net offence and three points in the first half, Alexander started the second half in his first meaningful playing time in the CFL. After receiving the second half kickoff, Alexander marched the team down the field and recorded his first professional touchdown pass on a five-yard scoring play to Reggie White Jr. He completed 12 consecutive passes and finished the game having completed 15 of 18 pass attempts for 178 yards and two touchdowns as well as two carries for 13 yards in the team's 20–16 comeback victory over the Roughriders. He went on to win the next three games while Fajardo was recovering from injury, winning each of the three starts. After Fajardo returned from injury, he started each game until the Alouettes clinched first place in the East Division. Alexander then started the Thanksgiving Day Classic against the Ottawa Redblacks and won his fourth start of the season. In total, he dressed in all 18 regular season games where he completed 105 of 151 pass attempts for 1,347 yards with six touchdowns and two interceptions. He also dressed in the East Final, but did not record a statistic in the team's loss to the Toronto Argonauts.

On November 26, 2024, it was reported that Alexander had signed a three-year contract extension with the Alouettes, indicating a commitment by the team to make him the starting quarterback for 2025. This was confirmed when the Alouettes traded Fajardo to the Edmonton Elks during the offseason. He began the 2025 season as the opening day starter and led the Alouettes to three straight wins before suffering a hamstring injury. He missed the following two games, both losses, and returned following a bye week on July 17, 2025, against the Toronto Argonauts. He completed 26 of 39 pass attempts for 303 yards with one touchdown pass and one interception, but re-aggravated his hamstring injury on a touchdown run in the Alouettes win. He missed another eight games due to the injury as the Alouettes went 3–5 without him. He returned in week 17 and set the record for most consecutive wins to start a career with nine, passing Danny McManus' eight-game mark. Davis won his next two starts, extending his record to 11 consecutive wins, before resting in the final game of the regular season with Montreal's playoff position already secured. He finished the regular season having started in seven games, recording 158 completions out of 218 attempts for 2,024 yards with ten touchdown passes and three interceptions.

In his first post-season start, in the East Semi Final against the Winnipeg, Alexander had 24 completions from 34 attempts for 384 yards with one touchdown, one interception, and a rushing touchdown in the 42–33 victory. In the East Final against the Hamilton Tiger-Cats, he completed 19 of 26 pass attempts for 210 yards with one touchdown and one interception in addition to recording a team-high 64 rushing yards. After getting the ball back with the score tied 16–16 with 1:41 left in the fourth quarter, Alexander led the Alouettes on a seven-play, 37-yard drive to set up José Carlos Maltos's game-winning 45-yard field goal. In his first season as a starting quarterback, Alexander led the Alouettes to an appearance in the 112th Grey Cup. He completed 22 of 34 pass attempts for 284 yards, but threw three interceptions as the Alouettes were defeated by the Saskatchewan Roughriders 25–17.

Alexander began the 2026 season with back-to-back victories over Hamilton and Toronto. In the latter game, he threw for a career-high 441 passing yards and two touchdowns. The victory marked his 13th consecutive regular-season win to begin his career as a starting quarterback, dating back to the 2024 season, before the streak was snapped the following week in an overtime loss to Edmonton. In Week 7 against Calgary, Alexander threw a game-winning touchdown pass in the final minute to cap a 402-yard, three-touchdown performance. During the victory, he also surpassed Darian Durant's CFL record of 324 consecutive pass attempts without an interception. At the conclusion of the regular season, Davis received the CFL's Most Outstanding Player Award.

== Career statistics ==
=== CFL ===
Legend
	Won the CFL's Most Outstanding Player Award
	Won the Grey Cup
	Led the league
**Bold**	Career high

=== Regular season ===
Year	Team	Games			Passing								Rushing			
Year	Team	GD	GS	Record	Cmp	Att	Pct	Yds	Y/A	TD	Int	Rtg	Att	Yds	Y/A	TD
2022	MTL	13	0	—	8	13	61.5	89	6.8	0	1	49.8	5	22	4.4	1
2023	MTL	18	0	—	6	8	**75.0**	56	7.0	0	0	93.8	1	0	0.0	0
2024	MTL	17	4	4–0	105	151	69.5	1,347	8.9	6	2	104.9	**24**	**166**	6.9	**3**
2025	MTL	8	7	7–0	158	218	72.5	2,024	9.3	10	3	110.7	12	110	**9.1**	1
2026	MTL	18	16	13–3	**380**	**527**	72.1	**5,257**	**10.0**	**35**	**4**	**122.7**	18	140	7.8	1
Career		74	27	24–3	657	917	71.6	8,773	9.6	51	10	115.6	60	438	7.3	6

=== Postseason ===
Year	Team	Games			Passing								Rushing			
Year	Team	GD	GS	Record	Cmp	Att	Pct	Yds	Y/A	TD	Int	Rtg	Att	Yds	Y/A	TD
2022	MTL	2	0	—	DNP											
2023	MTL	3	0	—	DNP											
2024	MTL	1	0	—	DNP											
2025	MTL	3	3	2–1	65	94	69.1	878	9.3	2	5	83.6	12	110	9.2	1
2026	MTL	2	2	1–1	23	35	65.7	373	10.7	2	0	120.3	5	25	5.0	0
Career		11	5	3–2	88	129	68.2	1,243	9.6	4	5	93.3	17	135	8.0	1

=== College ===
Season	Team	Games			Passing								Rushing			
Season	Team	GP	GS	Record	Cmp	Att	Pct	Yds	Y/A	TD	Int	Rtg	Att	Yds	Avg	TD
2016	Portland State	0	0	—	Redshirted (redshirt)											
2017	Portland State	6	3	0–3	90	157	57.3	1,233	7.9	5	3	130.0	44	120	2.7	2
2018	Portland State	11	10	4–6	126	238	52.9	1,786	7.5	11	7	125.3	112	424	3.8	12
2019	Portland State	12	12	5–7	209	367	56.9	2,913	7.9	25	8	141.7	122	517	4.3	5
2020	Portland State	1	1	0–1	15	25	60.0	193	7.7	1	1	130.0	9	33	3.7	0
2021	Portland State	11	11	5–6	266	433	61.4	3,075	7.1	21	12	131.5	75	160	2.1	6
Career		41	37	14–23	706	1,220	57.9	9,200	7.5	63	31	133.2	362	1,254	3.5	25
