= Clyde Duncan =

American football player (1961–2015)

No. 86
- Position: Wide receiver

Personal information
- Born: February 5, 1961; Oxon Hill, Maryland, U.S.
- Died: February 16, 2015 (aged 54); Fort Washington, Maryland, U.S.
- Listed height: 6 ft 1 in (1.85 m)
- Listed weight: 202 lb (92 kg)

Career information
- High school: Potomac (Oxon Hill)
- College: Tennessee
- NFL draft: 1984: 1st round, 17th overall pick

Career history
- St. Louis Cardinals (1984–1985); Cleveland Browns (1987)*
- * Offseason or practice squad member only

Career NFL statistics
- Receptions: 4
- Receiving yards: 39
- Touchdowns: 1
- Stats at Pro Football Reference

Clyde Louis Duncan, Jr. (February 5, 1961 – February 16, 2015) was an American professional football player who was a wide receiver for the St. Louis Cardinals of the National Football League (NFL). He played college football for the Tennessee Volunteers. Duncan was a first-round pick for the Cardinals in the 1984 NFL draft, but he only played in 1984 and 1985, finishing his career with just four receptions.

== Early life ==
Duncan attended Potomac High School, in Oxon Hill, Maryland. Playing at both receiver and tailback for Potomac's football team, he accumulated 2,209 yards his senior year, including 958 yards receiving and 808 yards rushing, and was named a high school All-American by Football News and the Maryland Player of the Year by the Washington Pigskin Club.

Duncan played college football at Tennessee from 1979 to 1983. Along with teammates Willie Gault, Anthony Hancock, Lenny Taylor and Tim McGee, he helped create the school's reputation as "Wide Receiver U." He played sparingly in 1979, redshirted in 1980, played as a defensive back in 1981, and played primarily as a reserve receiver in 1982. In 1983, however, he led the team in receiving with 33 catches for 640 yards and six touchdowns. He caught touchdown passes of 80 yards and 57 yards in Tennessee's 41–34 win over Alabama, and his 85-yard touchdown catch against Vanderbilt remains the third-longest in school history. He attracted close attention from scouts for his workout performance at the 1983 Blue–Gray Football Classic.

== Professional football career ==
Duncan was selected with the 17th overall pick in the first round of the 1984 NFL draft by the Cardinals. Duncan's rookie year was disrupted by a contract dispute, and he did not sign with the Cardinals until September 10. He soon separated his shoulder, sending him to the injured reserve list. In 1985, Duncan did work his way into the lineup, but caught only four passes on the season and lost his role as third receiver. The Cardinals released Duncan on August 18, 1986. Duncan was subsequently acquired by the Cleveland Browns in the spring of 1987, but he was released at the start of preseason and did not appear in another NFL game.

He died at the age of 54 in 2015.
