= Gordon Judges =

Canadian gridiron football player (born 1947)

Profile
- Positions: Defensive tackle, Defensive end

Personal information
- Born: July 30, 1947 (age 79); Toronto, Ontario, Canada
- Listed height: 6 ft 3 in (1.91 m)
- Listed weight: 250 lb (113 kg)

Career history
- 1968: Toronto Argonauts
- 1968–1980: Montreal Alouettes
- 1980–1981: Toronto Argonauts
- 1982: Montreal Concordes

Awards and highlights
- 3× Grey Cup champion (1970, 1974, 1977); CFL East All-Star (1973)

Gordon Judges (born July 30, 1947) is a Canadian former professional football defensive lineman for the Montreal Alouettes in the Canadian Football League.

Judges played his amateur football with the Scarborough Rams. He had a 14-year career with Montreal and the Toronto Argonauts from 1968 to 1982. He played in 6 Grey Cup games, winning 3, in 1970, 1974 and 1977. In 1978 Gordon was chosen the Alouettes Most Valuable Player.

He won the 2002 NFL/CFL High School Coach of the Year award for his work with St. Mary Catholic Secondary School in Pickering, Ontario. His son, James Judges, was selected by the Alouettes in the fourth round (31st overall) in the 2007 CFL draft and signed in March, 2008.
