= José Maltos Díaz =

Mexican gridiron football player (born 1991)

José Carlos Maltos
No. 19 – Montreal Alouettes
- Position: Placekicker
- Roster status: Active
- CFL status: Global

Personal information
- Born: August 18, 1991 (age 35); Escobedo, Nuevo León, Mexico
- Listed height: 5 ft 9 in (1.75 m)
- Listed weight: 223 lb (101 kg)

Career information
- High school: Preparatoria 16 (Escobedo, Nuevo León)
- College: UANL
- NFL draft: 2013: undrafted
- CFL draft: 2019 LFA: 1st round, 2nd overall pick

Career history
- New Orleans Saints (2013)*; Fundidores de Monterrey (2017–2019); BC Lions (2018)*; Ottawa Redblacks (2019–2022); Montreal Alouettes (2023–present)
- * Offseason or practice squad member only

Awards and highlights
- Grey Cup champion (2023); CFL East All-Star (2026)
- Stats at CFL.ca

José Maltos Díaz
Medal record

Men's American football

Representing Mexico

World Championship
Bronze medal – third place	2015 United States	Team

José Carlos Maltos Díaz (born August 18, 1991) is a Mexican professional gridiron football placekicker for the Montreal Alouettes of the Canadian Football League (CFL). The Redblacks selected him second overall in the 2019 CFL–LFA draft. He was originally signed by the New Orleans Saints of the National Football League (NFL) in 2013, but was released following training camp. He played college football for UANL.

== Early life ==
Maltos was born on August 18, 1991 in General Escobedo, Nuevo León, Mexico, and has three brothers. He grew up playing soccer, featuring in the Tercera División for Club Excélsior. Maltos attended Preparatoria 16 de la UANL, where he played American football for the first time at age 16 as a kicker for the Toros de la Prepa 16.

== College career ==
Maltos was a kicker for Auténticos Tigres UANL at the Autonomous University of Nuevo León, where he studied mechanical engineering. He was chosen to play in the Aztec Bowl. Maltos was later named to the ONEFA Liga Mayor Team of the Decade for the 2010s by Mundo del Ovoide.

== Professional career ==
=== New Orleans Saints ===
After working out in front of NFL scouts at Southern Methodist University, Maltos was signed by the New Orleans Saints in May 2013. He was released by the team in early August.

=== Fundidores Monterrey ===
Maltos spent three seasons in the LFA with the Fundidores Monterrey from 2017 to 2019.

=== BC Lions ===
Maltos was signed as a free agent by the BC Lions on May 18, 2018. He played in two pre-season games before being released at the end of training camp.

=== Ottawa Redblacks ===
After the CFL mandated that teams carry Global players, Maltos was drafted 2nd overall in the 2019 CFL–LFA draft and returned to Canada to play for the Ottawa Redblacks. He dressed in his first CFL game on June 15, 2019, against the Calgary Stampeders, as a backup placekicker and punter. He dressed in ten games in 2019, but did not play in 2020 due to the cancellation of the 2020 CFL season. He re-signed with the Redblacks on January 13, 2021. He spent the next two years mostly on the practice roster, dressing in one game in the 2022 season, and was not re-signed following the 2022 season.

=== Montreal Alouettes ===
On December 9, 2022, Maltos signed with the Montreal Alouettes. In 2023, he played in his first game as a CFL team's primary placekicker on October 9, 2023, where he made two of four field goal attempts and all three convert attempts, in a game against the Ottawa Redblacks. In the next game, on October 14, 2023, he was five-for-five on field goal attempts, including a long of 50 yards. He played in those two regular season games in 2023 where he finished seven-for-nine on field goal attempts and five-for-six on convert attempts. With incumbent placekicker, David Côté, healthy, Maltos returned to the practice roster where he remained while the Alouettes defeated the Winnipeg Blue Bombers in the 110th Grey Cup game.

Maltos re-signed with the Alouettes on December 15, 2023. He again began the season on the practice roster, but was pressed into action on July 6, 2024, following an injury to Côté. He had his first perfect game as he connected on all three field goal attempts and his only convert attempt.

== National team career ==
Maltos represented the Mexico national team at the 2011 IFAF World Championship held in Austria, where he kicked a 56-yard field goal in a win over Australia to break the record for longest field goal in World Championship history. He was named the best kicker of the tournament. Maltos was later a part of the team that finished in third place at the 2015 IFAF World Championship.
