= 1981 Garden State Bowl =

American college football game

Tennessee Volunteers	Wisconsin Badgers
(7–4)	(7–4)
28	21
Head coach: Johnny Majors	Head coach: Dave McClain
	1	2	3	4	Total
Tennessee	13	8	0	7	28
Wisconsin	7	0	0	14	21
- Date: December 13, 1981
- Season: 1981
- Stadium: Giants Stadium
- Location: East Rutherford, New Jersey
- MVP: QB Steve Alatorre (Tennessee); WR Anthony Hancock (Tennessee); QB Randy Wright (Wisconsin)
- Referee: Ted Humphrey
- Attendance: 38,782

United States TV coverage
- Network: Mizlou Television Network
- Announcers: Ray Scott and Al DeRogatis

The 1981 Garden State Bowl, part of the 1981–82 bowl game season, took place on December 13, 1981, at Giants Stadium in East Rutherford, New Jersey. The competing teams were the Tennessee Volunteers, representing the Southeastern Conference (SEC), and the Wisconsin Badgers, representing the Big Ten Conference (Big 10). In what was the final edition of the game, Tennessee won 28–21.

== Teams ==
=== Tennessee ===
The 1981 Tennessee squad was undefeated at Neyland Stadium but finished 2–4 on the road. The Volunteers lost to Georgia, USC, Alabama and Kentucky. They accepted an invitation to play in the Garden State Bowl against Wisconsin following their loss to Kentucky on November 21. The appearance was the first for Tennessee in the Garden State Bowl and their 23rd overall bowl appearance.

=== Wisconsin ===
The 1981 Wisconsin squad was 5–2 at Camp Randall Stadium, and 2–2 on the road to finish the regular season 7–4. The Badgers lost to UCLA, Michigan State, Illinois and Iowa. The appearance marked the fourth overall bowl appearance for Wisconsin and their first non-Rose Bowl Game.

== Game summary ==
Tennessee drove 74-yards on their opening drive and Fuad Reveiz connected on a 22-yard field goal to give the Volunteers a 3–0 lead. On the following possession Wisconsin took a 7–3 lead after Jess Cole scored on a three-yard touchdown run. The lead was short-lived as Willie Gault returned the ensuing kickoff 87-yards to give Tennessee a 10–7 lead. The Volunteers extended their lead to 13–7 at the end of the first quarter after Reveiz connected on a 44-yard field goal. Tennessee extended their lead further to 21–7 at halftime after a 43-yard Steve Alatorre touchdown pass to Anthony Hancock and a successful two-point conversion in the second quarter. After a scoreless third quarter, the teams traded fourth-quarter touchdowns. The Badgers scored on Randy Wright touchdown passes to Jeff Nault and Thaddus McFadden and the Volunteers on a six-yard Alatorre run.

Scoring summary

Quarter	Time	Drive			Team	Scoring information	Score	
Quarter	Time	Plays	Yards	TOP	Team	Scoring information	Tennessee	Wisconsin
1	10:17	13	74	4:43	Tennessee	22-yard field goal by Fuad Reveiz	3	0
1	6:14	9	68	3:57	Wisconsin	Jess Cole 3-yard touchdown run, Mark Doran kick good	3	7
1	6:03	1	87	0:11	Tennessee	87-yard kickoff return by Willie Gault, Fuad Reveiz kick good	10	7
1	1:44	4			Tennessee	44-yard field goal by Fuad Reveiz	13	7
2	5:34	4	87		Tennessee	Anthony Hancock 43-yard touchdown reception from Steve Alatorre, 2-point pass good	21	7
4	13:40	9	80		Wisconsin	Jeff Nault 6-yard touchdown reception from Randy Wright, Mark Doran kick good	21	14
4	8:23				Tennessee	Steve Alatorre 6-yard touchdown run, Fuad Reveiz kick good	28	14
4	5:29				Wisconsin	Thaddus McFadden 11-yard touchdown reception from Randy Wright, Mark Doran kick good	28	21
"TOP" = time of possession. For other American football terms, see Glossary of American football.							28	21
