= David Côté (Canadian football) =

Canadian gridiron football player (born 1996)

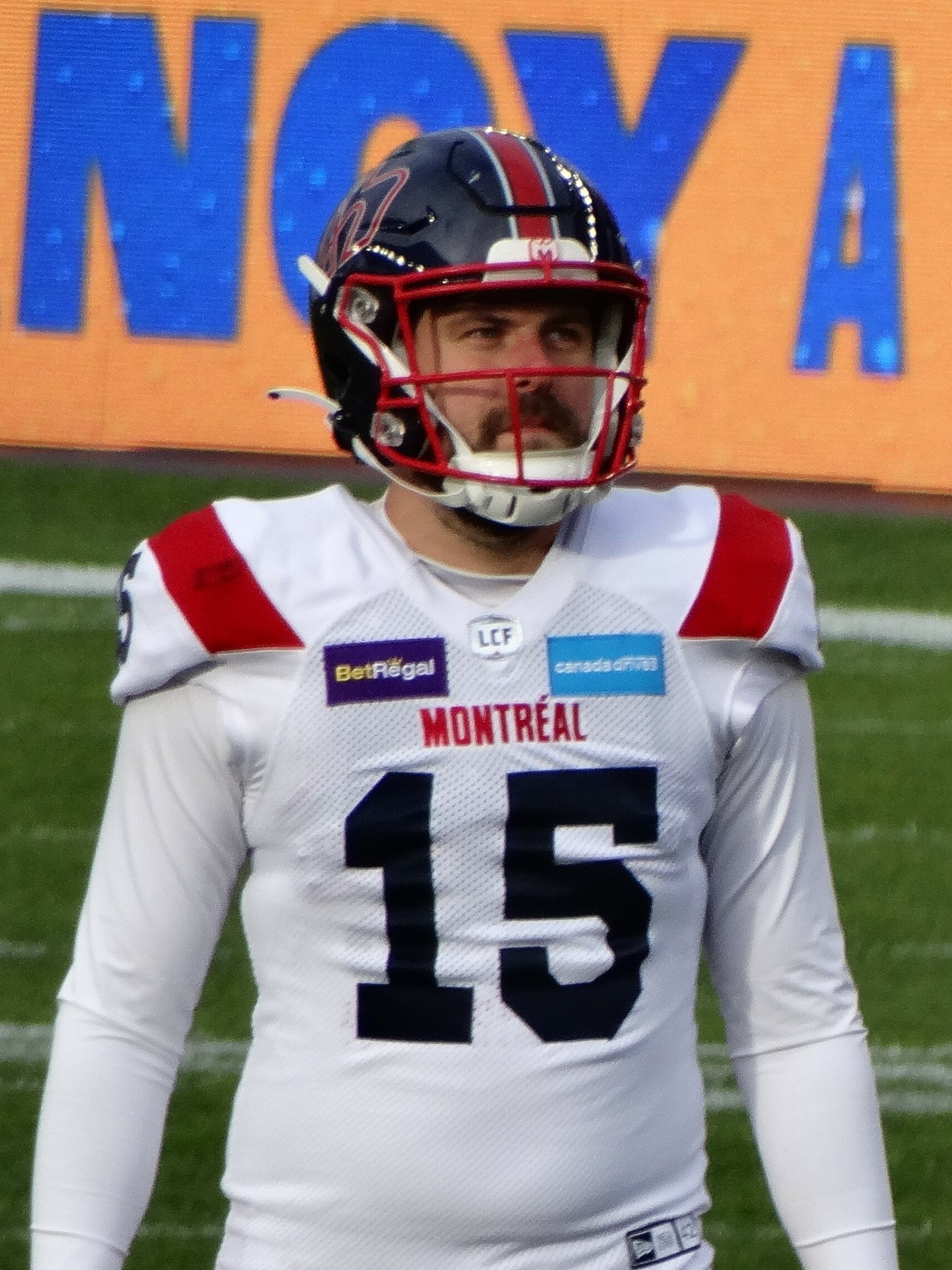
- Côté with the Montreal Alouettes in 2022

Profile
- Position: Placekicker

Personal information
- Born: November 20, 1996 (age 29); Quebec City, Quebec, Canada
- Listed height: 6 ft 4 in (1.93 m)
- Listed weight: 223 lb (101 kg)

Career information
- University: Laval
- CFL draft: 2021: 5th round, 45th overall pick

Career history
- 2021–2024: Montreal Alouettes

Awards and highlights
- Grey Cup champion (2023); Vanier Cup champion (2018)
- Stats at CFL.ca

David Côté (born November 20, 1996) is a Canadian former professional football placekicker who played for four seasons for the Montreal Alouettes of the Canadian Football League (CFL). He is a Vanier Cup champion after winning with the Laval Rouge et Or in 2018 and he is a Grey Cup champion after winning with the Alouettes in 2023.

== Amateur career ==
Before playing at the university level, Côté played at the high school level for Académie Saint-Louis as a receiver/kicker and at the "cégep" level for Campus Notre-Dame-de-Foy (CNDF) as a kicker. Côté then played U Sports football for the Laval Rouge et Or from 2017 to 2019. He was named a U Sports Second-team All-Canadian in 2018 after connecting on 19 of 23 field goal attempts and being successful on all 26 of his point-after-touchdown converts. He finished that season as a Vanier Cup champion after the Rouge et Or completed an undefeated season and were victorious over the Western Mustangs in the 54th Vanier Cup. In that game, Côté was successful on both field goal attempts and all four convert tries. He did not play in 2020 due to the cancellation of the 2020 U Sports football season and remained draft-eligible for the Canadian Football League in 2021.

== Professional career ==
Pre-draft measurables
Height	Weight	40-yard dash	20-yard shuttle	Three-cone drill	Broad jump	Bench press
6 ft 4 in (1.93 m)	223 lb (101 kg)	4.76 s	4.00 s	6.53 s	10 ft 2 1/8 in (3.10 m)	9 reps
All values from CFL Combine

Upon entering the 2021 CFL draft, Côté was drafted in the fifth round, 45th overall, by the Montreal Alouettes and signed with the team on June 2, 2021. He beat fellow kickers Tyler Crapigna and Félix Ménard-Brière during training camp to win the job as the team's placekicker to open the season. He played in his first professional game on August 14, 2021, against the Edmonton Elks where he was successful on three of his four field goal attempts, with the lone miss coming from a bad snap from centre. He also handled the team's kickoffs where he had four kicks with a 64.8-yard average. Overall for the 2021 season, he played in 14 regular season games where he made 32 out of 39 field goal attempts and 32 of 34 conversions.

In 2022, Côté was successful on 44 of 51 field goal attempts and connected on a career-long 52-yard field goal on October 1, 2022, against the Elks. He had a challenging year in 2023 where he made just 39 of 52 field goal attempts for a 75.0% success rate. However, he remained consistent with convert attempts, connecting on 28 of 29 tries. This extended to the Grey Cup game that year where Côté had no field goal attempts, but was a perfect 4-for-4 on converts as the Alouettes defeated the Winnipeg Blue Bombers in the 110th Grey Cup game.

In the 2024 season, Côté connected on 10 of 12 field goal attempts in the first four games, including a new career-long 53-yard field goal on June 15, 2024, again against the Elks. However, he was then placed on the injured list for the rest of the regular season and post-season due to a thigh injury. He signed a contract extension on January 10, 2025, but recognized that he was unable to continue due to his injury, so he announced his retirement on April 18, 2025.
