= Ken Johnson (quarterback) =

American gridiron football player (born 1951)

Profile
- Position: Quarterback

Personal information
- Born: January 5, 1951 (age 75); Scottsdale, Arizona, U.S.
- Listed height: 6 ft 2 in (1.88 m)
- Listed weight: 205 lb (93 kg)

Career information
- High school: Scottsdale, Arizona
- College: Colorado

Career history
- 1974: Portland Storm
- 1977: Buffalo Bills
- 1978–1981: Calgary Stampeders
- 1981: Montreal Alouettes
- 1982: Montreal Concordes
- 1983: Denver Gold
- 1984: Memphis Showboats

Ken Johnson (born January 5, 1951) is an American former quarterback in the Canadian Football League (CFL).

Johnson was a graduate of the University of Colorado at Boulder, where he played from 1971 to 1973 and earned a degree in marketing. His career record as a starter for the Buffs was 18 wins and 5 losses. He led the Buffaloes to road wins over LSU and Ohio State in 1971 (and a #3 national ranking) and a home win against Oklahoma in 1972. At the time his college career ended, he was ranked #3 in the history of Colorado in total offense. He began his professional career in 1974 as a back-up quarterback for the World Football League's Portland Storm. In June, 1977, Johnson was signed as a free agent by the National Football League's Buffalo Bills. Though he was on the active roster for 14 games, he saw no action with the Bills and was released on August 22, 1978. A month later, Johnson signed with the Calgary Stampeders of the Canadian Football League.

Seeing limited action in 1978, Johnson earned the Stampeders' starting job in 1979. Appearing in all 16 regular season games, Johnson completed 56.4% of his passes (176 of 312) for 2344 yards, 19 touchdowns, and 8 interceptions as he led the Stampeders to a 12-4 record and a CFL playoff berth. Johnson led the CFL in passing for the 1979 season. After falling one win short of the Grey Cup game in 1979, Johnson followed up with another solid season in 1980 setting a career-high in touchdown passes (22) while completing 56.0% of his passes (218 of 389) for 3019 yards. The Stampeders finished 9-7 in 1980 and were eliminated in the first round of the CFL playoffs. The Stampeders slide would continue in 1981, which likely led to Johnson being traded after 12 games to the Montreal Alouettes on October 11, 1981. Overall, he would appear in 15 games that season, completing a career-high 59.3% of his passes (254 of 428) for 3364 yards, 18 touchdowns, and 13 interceptions. Johnson would not see much action with the reborn Montreal franchise, Montreal Concordes, in 1982. He appeared in only 2 games before being traded to the Toronto Argonauts for linebacker Duncan MacKinlay on August 4, 1982.

Granted free agency on January 15, 1983, Johnson returned to the U.S. when he signed with the USFL's Denver Gold five days later. Though starting the season as a backup, Johnson would officially take over the starting job in Week 3 on a snowy Soldier Field in Chicago. Facing bitter cold, 20 mph winds, and George Allen's veteran-laden Chicago Blitz squad, Johnson led a 70 yard long game-winning drive late in the 4th quarter. Johnson dove into the endzone on 4th down with only 22 seconds remaining to cap off the drive and seal the Gold's win (Gold 16, Blitz 13). Johnson would remain the primary starter until an ankle injury ended his season during a Week 11 loss to the Boston Breakers. Johnson finished the season completing 48.8% of his passes (121 of 248) for 1115 yards, and 6 touchdowns. The Gold released Johnson on January 9, 1984, and was awarded on waivers to the Memphis Showboats on January 16, 1984. Johnson saw limited action as a backup to Walter Lewis during the 1984 season and retired prior to the 1985 season.
