= Pat Abbruzzi =

American gridiron football player and coach (1932–1998)

Pasquale "Pat" Abbruzzi
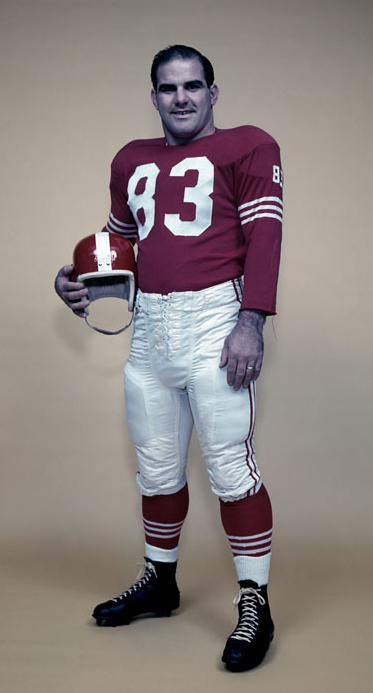

No. 83
- Position: Running back

Personal information
- Born: August 29, 1932; Warren, Rhode Island, U.S.
- Died: June 3, 1998 (aged 65); Boston, Massachusetts, U.S.

Career information
- College: University of Rhode Island
- NFL draft: 1955: 13th round, 147th overall pick

Career history
- 1955–1958: Montreal Alouettes

Awards and highlights
- Schenley Award (1955); 2× East All Star (1955, 1956)

Pasquale Abbruzzi (August 29, 1932 – June 3, 1998) was an American college and professional Canadian football running back and a successful high school football coach. Abbruzzi played collegiately for the University of Rhode Island (Class of 1955), and professionally for the Canadian Football League (CFL)'s Montreal Alouettes for four years (1955–1959).

== Early life and college career ==
Abbruzzi was born and raised in Warren, Rhode Island, and was the younger brother of another NFL player, Lou "Duke" Abbruzzi. Abbruzzi attended Warren High School and went on to the University of Rhode Island.

As a member of the Rhode Island Rams football team, from 1951 to 1954, he was an all-star running back. He rushed 562 times for a school record 3389 yards (averaging 6 yards per carry) and 25 touchdowns. His greatest and record-setting day was October 4, 1952, versus New Hampshire (a 27–7 win). In this game, Abbruzzi rushed for 306 yards, including a 99-yard run from scrimmage, both school records. He also scored 3 touchdowns. He was named All-Yankee Conference each of these years and named a New England All-Star from 1952 to 1954.

== Professional football career ==
Abbruzzi was drafted twice by the Baltimore Colts of the NFL in 1954 (30th round, 352 overall) and 1955 (13th round, 147 overall). Abbruzzi chose the Montreal Alouettes of the Interprovincial Rugby Football Union (one of the forerunners of the Canadian Football League) for a professional career, mostly because they offered him a $500 bonus which he used for his honeymoon.

In four years with the Alouettes, 1955 to 1958, he played 49 regular season games and 2 Grey Cup matches (against the Edmonton Eskimos.) He rushed 700 times for a total of 3749 yards (5.4-yard average) with 25 rushing touchdowns and eleven 100-yard rushing games.

Abbruzzi's greatest year was his first in Canada, 1955, when he was part of a dynamic Als team that contended for the 1955 Grey Cup. Abbruzzi rushed 182 times and led the Canadian leagues in rushing with 1,248 yards (6.9-yard average) and in touchdowns with 17 (his longest rush was 69 yards). Abbruzzi was named the third recipient of the Schenley Award (most outstanding player in Canada), as well as an East All-Star, at the conclusion of the 1955 season. Abbruzzi continued as the Larks' top rusher in 1956 with 1,062 yards and was named to a second consecutive East All-Star team in 1956. His 20 touchdowns that year stood alone as a CFL record until 1990 and was finally surpassed by Allen Pitts in 1994. In 1957, Abbruzzi had 809 yards, but an injury-plagued 1958 season turned out to be his last, when Abbruzzi finished the year with 630 yards. In July 1959 he was traded to the Calgary Stampeders for Veryl Switzer during training camp but was released before the start of the 1959 regular season.

== Career regular season rushing statistics ==
Year	Team	Games	Rush	Yards	Y/R	Lg	TD
1955	Montreal Alouettes	12	182	1248	6.9	63	17
1956	Montreal Alouettes	14	207	1062	5.1	50	17
1957	Montreal Alouettes	14	178	809	4.5	28	7
1958	Montreal Alouettes	9	133	630	4.7	28	4
	CFL Totals	49	700	3749	5.4	63	45

https://www.statscrew.com/football/stats/p-abbrupat001

== Teaching career and high school coaching career ==
After his professional career, Abbruzzi became a successful physical education teacher and football coach at his alma mater, Warren High School in Warren, Rhode Island. He coached eight division champions over 26 years and also coached baseball in his spare time. During the 1970s his football team set an interscholastic league record of 31 victories in a row.

Abbruzzi was named to the University of Rhode Island Athletic Hall of Fame in 1972 and the Rhode Island Football Coaches Hall of Fame in 1976. He was a charter member of the Warren Athletic Hall of Fame (1998) and in 2005 Pat was named to the Rhode Island Interscholastic League Hall of Fame. He was later elected to the Sons of Italy Athletic Hall of Fame.

== Death ==
Pat Abbruzzi died on June 3, 1998.
