= Luc Tousignant =

Canadian football and handball player (born 1958)

Profile
- Position: Quarterback

Personal information
- Born: July 4, 1958 (age 68); Trois-Rivières, Quebec, Canada
- Listed height: 6 ft 3 in (1.91 m)
- Listed weight: 185 lb (84 kg)

Career information
- College: Fairmont State University
- NFL draft: 1982: 8th round, 218th overall pick
- CFL draft: 1982

Career history
- 1982: Montreal Concordes

Awards and highlights
- Fairmont State Athletic Hall of Fame (2008)

Luc Tousignant (French pronunciation: [lyk tusiɲɑ̃]; born July 4, 1958) is a former quarterback in the Canadian Football League (CFL) and Olympic handball player.

He competed in three matches at the 1976 Summer Olympics with the Canadian handball team, which finished eleventh in the Olympic tournament.

Tousignant attended Fairmont State University from 1978 to 1981, and played in the West Virginia Intercollegiate Athletic Conference. He was a second-team All-America honouree, the WVIAC's offensive player of the year, and a first-team all-league selection in 1981, when he led the Falcons to the conference title, a 9-2 overall record, and a berth in the NAIA Playoffs. His 4,737 passing yards and 30 career touchdown passes were school records which stood for 14 years.

He was drafted in the 1982 NFL draft by the NFL's Buffalo Bills in the eighth round, 218th overall. He chose not to sign with the Bills, and instead joined the CFL.

Tousignant's only professional season was the 1982 CFL season with the Montreal Concordes (which is part of the Montreal Alouettes franchise history). He played in all of their 16 games, starting 5 times. He completed only 75 of his 174 passes, for 989 yards, 4 touchdowns, and 11 interceptions. The Concordes finished the year 2–14.

He is notable for not only being a Canadian starting at quarterback for a CFL team, which is rare, but is also the only French Canadian ever to start at quarterback.

In 2008, the Fairmont State University Athletic Association named him to their Athletic Hall of Fame.
