= Mike Miller (sprinter) =

American athlete (born 1959)

No. 89, 80
- Position: Wide receiver

Personal information
- Born: December 29, 1959 (age 66); Flint, Michigan, U.S.
- Listed height: 5 ft 11 in (1.80 m)
- Listed weight: 182 lb (83 kg)

Career information
- High school: Flint Northern (Flint, Michigan)
- College: Tennessee
- NFL draft: 1983: 4th round, 104th overall pick

Career history
- Green Bay Packers (1983)*; New York Giants (1983); Cleveland Browns (1985)*; New Orleans Saints (1985)
- * Offseason or practice squad member only

Awards and highlights
- Greater Flint Afro-American Hall of Fame (2006)

Career NFL statistics
- Receptions: 7
- Receiving yards: 170
- Stats at Pro Football Reference

Michael Duane Miller (born December 29, 1959) is an American former track and field sprinter and professional football wide receiver. Representing the United States, he is best known for setting the 1982 world's best year performance in the men's 200 metres. He did so at altitude on June 2, 1982, at a meet in Provo, Utah, clocking 20.15. Miller was an All-American track athlete at the University of Tennessee.

== Professional career ==
Miller was selected by the Green Bay Packers in the fourth round (104th overall) of the 1983 NFL draft. He played for the New York Giants in 1983 and the New Orleans Saints in 1985.

Sporting positions
Preceded by (United States) James Sanford	Men's 200m Best Year Performance; 1982	Succeeded by (United States) Carl Lewis
