= Johnny Evans (gridiron football, born 1956) =

American football player (born 1956)

No. 8
- Positions: Punter, quarterback

Personal information
- Born: February 18, 1956 (age 70); High Point, North Carolina, U.S.
- Listed height: 6 ft 1 in (1.85 m)
- Listed weight: 197 lb (89 kg)

Career information
- High school: T.W. Andrews (High Point, North Carolina)
- College: NC State
- NFL draft: 1978: 2nd round, 39th overall pick

Career history
- Cleveland Browns (1978–1980); Montreal Concordes (1982–1983); Edmonton Eskimos (1984)

Career NFL statistics
- Punts: 214
- Punt yards: 8,463
- Longest punt: 65
- Stats at Pro Football Reference

John Albert Evans Jr. (born February 18, 1956) is an American former professional football punter and quarterback and current radio sportscaster for the North Carolina State Wolfpack football team. He is also the Eastern NC Director for the Fellowship of Christian Athletes. He played his college football career for NC State where he led the team to an 8–4 record his senior season, and was named MVP of the 1977 Peach Bowl. He completed three years in the NFL for the Cleveland Browns and four years in the CFL for the Montreal Alouettes/Concordes and the Edmonton Eskimos. Since 1996 he has been the radio color commentator for NC State football. He is the father of quadruplets, two of whom played football for NC State.
