= 2007 Winnipeg Blue Bombers season =

Canadian football team season

- Head coach: Doug Berry
- Home stadium: Canad Inns Stadium

Results
- Record: 10–7–1
- Division place: 2nd, East
- Playoffs: Lost Grey Cup

Uniform

The 2007 Winnipeg Blue Bombers season was the 50th season for the team in the Canadian Football League (CFL) and their 75th overall. They attempted to win their 11th Grey Cup championship, but they lost in the Grey Cup game against the Saskatchewan Roughriders.

== Offseason ==
=== CFL draft ===
| Round | Pick | Player | Position | School/Club team |

== Regular season ==
=== Season standings ===
East Division
| Pos | Team | Pld | W | L | T | PF | PA | PD | Pts |
|---|---|---|---|---|---|---|---|---|---|
| 1 | Toronto Argonauts (C, Q) | 18 | 11 | 7 | 0 | 440 | 336 | +104 | 22 |
| 2 | Winnipeg Blue Bombers (Q) | 18 | 10 | 7 | 1 | 439 | 404 | +35 | 21 |
| 3 | Montreal Alouettes (Q) | 18 | 8 | 10 | 0 | 398 | 433 | −35 | 16 |
| 4 | Hamilton Tiger-Cats | 18 | 3 | 15 | 0 | 315 | 514 | −199 | 6 |

Source: "2007 Regular Season Standings". Canadian Football League. Archived from the original on 2008-09-21.
(C) First round bye; (Q) Qualified for playoffs

=== Season schedule ===
| Week | Date | Opponent | Score | Result | Attendance | Record |
|---|---|---|---|---|---|---|
| 1 | June 28 | at Edmonton Eskimos | 39–39 | Tie | 33,038 | 0–0–1 |
| 2 | July 5 | vs. Montreal Alouettes | 32–23 | Win | 29,533 | 1–0–1 |
| 3 | July 13 | vs. Edmonton Eskimos | 19–15 | Loss | 29,533 | 1–1–1 |
| 4 | July 19 | at Montreal Alouettes | 20–18 | Win | 20,202 | 2–1–1 |
| 5 | July 27 | vs. Hamilton Tiger-Cats | 36–18 | Win | 29,533 | 3–1–1 |
| 6 | Aug 3 | at Hamilton Tiger-Cats | 43–22 | Loss | 24,201 | 3–2–1 |
| 7 | Aug 10 | at BC Lions | 22–21 | Win | 31,525 | 4–2–1 |
| 8 | Bye | | | | | 4–2–1 |
| 9 | Aug 24 | vs. Toronto Argonauts | 15–13 | Win | 29,533 | 5–2–1 |
| 10 | Sept 2 | at Saskatchewan Roughriders | 31–26 | Loss | 28,800 | 5–3–1 |
| 11 | Sept 9 | vs. Saskatchewan Roughriders | 34–15 | Win | 29,783 | 6–3–1 |
| 12 | Sept 15 | at Hamilton Tiger-Cats | 34–4 | Win | 21,205 | 7–3–1 |
| 13 | Sept 23 | at Toronto Argonauts | 31–23 | Loss | 26,423 | 7–4–1 |
| 14 | Sept 29 | vs. Hamilton Tiger-Cats | 21–19 | Win | 27,102 | 8–4–1 |
| 15 | Oct 5 | vs. BC Lions | 26–20 | Loss | 26,593 | 8–5–1 |
| 16 | Oct 14 | at Calgary Stampeders | 38–25 | Loss | 30,897 | 8–6–1 |
| 17 | Oct 19 | vs. Calgary Stampeders | 27–13 | Win | 23,955 | 9–6–1 |
| 18 | Oct 27 | at Toronto Argonauts | 16–8 | Loss | 40,116 | 9–7–1 |
| 19 | Nov 2 | vs. Montreal Alouettes | 20–17 | Win | 23,744 | 10–7–1 |

== Roster ==
2007 Winnipeg Blue Bombers final roster
| Quarterbacks: 2 Ryan Dinwiddie; 5 Kevin Glenn; 16 Kliff Kingsbury; 18 Zac Taylor; Running backs: 20 Gilles Lezi; 32 Fred Reid; 1 Charles Roberts; Receivers: 83 Derick Armstrong; 82 Terrence Edwards; 86 Arjei Franklin; 85 Milt Stegall; 88 Jamie Stoddard; 19 Keith Stokes; 0 O'Neil Wilson | Offensive linemen: 69 Paul Archer C; 66 Alexandre Gauthier T; 64 Dan Goodspeed T; 61 Kyle Koch G; 67 Matt O'Meara G/T; 53 Dominic Picard C; 54 Matt Sheridan G; Defensive linemen: 90 Adrian Baird DE; 97 Doug Brown DT; 44 Tom Canada DE; 99 Jerome Haywood DT; 91 Shawn Mayne DE; 77 Jon Oosterhuis DT; 98 Gavin Walls DE | Linebackers: 10 Ike Charlton; 40 Cam Hall; 23 Kyries Hebert; 34 David Lowery; 42 Neil McKinlay; 51 Barrin Simpson; Defensive backs: 25 Robert Bean; 8 Greg Bearman; 2 Davin Bush; 3 Anthony Malbrough; 27 Kelly Malveaux; 13 Jason Nugent; 9 Sam Young; Special teams: 50 Chris Cvetkovic LS; 7 Troy Westwood K/P | Reserve roster: 68 Andrew Greene G; 31 Ian Logan DB; 22 Greg Moss DB; Practice roster: 56 Stevie Baggs DE; 55 Riley Clayton T; 81 Adam Eckert SB; 17 Willie Foster WR; 12 Kerry Johnson WR; 93 Matt Kuda DT; 24 Chijioke Onyenegecha DB; Injured list: 21 Juran Bolden DB; 84 Chris Brazzell SB; 38 Pat Fleming P; 92 Brian Guebert DT; 87 Albert Johnson WR; 60 Obby Khan C; 33 Brad Newman LB; 14 Rob Pikula P/K; Italics indicate International player |

== Playoffs ==
=== East Semi-Final ===
Date and time: Sunday, November 11, 2:00 PM Central Standard Time
Venue: Canad Inns Stadium, Winnipeg, Manitoba

| Team | Q1 | Q2 | Q3 | Q4 | Total |
|---|---|---|---|---|---|
| Montreal Alouettes | 0 | 16 | 3 | 3 | 22 |
| Winnipeg Blue Bombers | 7 | 3 | 7 | 7 | 24 |

=== East Final ===
Date and time: Sunday, November 18, 1:00 PM Central Standard Time
Venue: Rogers Centre, Toronto, Ontario

| Team | Q1 | Q2 | Q3 | Q4 | Total |
|---|---|---|---|---|---|
| Toronto Argonauts | 1 | 0 | 0 | 8 | 9 |
| Winnipeg Blue Bombers | 7 | 5 | 7 | 0 | 19 |

=== Grey Cup ===
Date and time: Sunday, November 25, 5:30 PM Central Standard Time
Venue: Rogers Centre, Toronto, Ontario

| Team | Q1 | Q2 | Q3 | Q4 | Total |
|---|---|---|---|---|---|
| Saskatchewan Roughriders | 0 | 10 | 6 | 7 | 23 |
| Winnipeg Blue Bombers | 3 | 4 | 7 | 5 | 19 |
