= 2006 Montreal Alouettes season =

Canadian football team season

- Head coach: Don Matthews; Jim Popp (Interim)
- Home stadium: Molson Stadium

Results
- Record: 10–8
- Division place: 1st, East
- Playoffs: Lost Grey Cup

Uniform

The 2006 Montreal Alouettes finished in first place in the East Division with a 10–8 record. They won their first seven games, only to lose the next six in a row. After ending the losing streak against the Winnipeg Blue Bombers, head coach Don Matthews resigned, expressing undisclosed health issues that were "affecting his ability to perform". General Manager Jim Popp took over on an interim basis finishing the season 2–2. The Alouettes finished first in the East division and defeated the Toronto Argonauts in the East Final before losing the 94th Grey Cup to the BC Lions 25–14.

== Offseason ==
=== CFL draft ===
Round	Pick	Player	Position	School/Club team
1	7	Éric Deslauriers	WR	Eastern Michigan
2	16	Étienne Boulay	DB	New Hampshire
3	24	Jeff Perret	OT	Tulsa
4	32	Ivan Birungi	WR	Acadia
4	33	Adrian Davis	DL	Marshall
5	41	Joel Wright	DB	Wilfrid Laurier
6	43	Danny Desriveaux	WR	Richmond

=== Preseason ===
Week	Date	Opponent	Venue	Score	Result	Attendance	Record
A	June 2	at Winnipeg Blue Bombers	Canad Inns Stadium	25–24	Win	27,573	1–0
B	June 8	Winnipeg Blue Bombers	Molson Stadium	30–15	Win	20,202	2–0

== Regular season ==
=== Season standings ===
East Division
Pos	Team	Pld	W	L	T	PF	PA	PD	Pts
1	Montreal Alouettes (C, Q)	18	10	8	0	451	431	+20	20
2	Toronto Argonauts (Q)	18	10	8	0	359	343	+16	20
3	Winnipeg Blue Bombers (Q)	18	9	9	0	362	408	−46	18
4	Hamilton Tiger-Cats	18	4	14	0	292	495	−203	8

Source: "2006 Regular Season Standings". Canadian Football League. Archived from the original on 2008-09-21.
(C) First round bye; (Q) Qualified for playoffs

=== Season schedule ===
Week	Date	Opponent	Venue	Score	Result	Attendance	Record
1	June 16	Winnipeg Blue Bombers	Molson Stadium	27–17	Win	20,202	1–0
2	June 24	at Hamilton Tiger-Cats	Ivor Wynne Stadium	32–14	Win	27,911	2–0
3	Bye						
4	July 6	Hamilton Tiger-Cats	Molson Stadium	32–29	Win	20,202	3–0
5	July 15	at Winnipeg Blue Bombers	Canad Inns Stadium	44–16	Win	28,131	4–0
6	July 20	Hamilton Tiger-Cats	Molson Stadium	41–38	Win	20,202	5–0
7	July 28	at Edmonton Eskimos	Commonwealth Stadium	21–13	Win	32,411	6–0
8	Aug 3	Toronto Argonauts	Molson Stadium	31–7	Win	20,202	7–0
9	Aug 12	at Calgary Stampeders	McMahon Stadium	27–24	Loss	29,452	7–1
10	Aug 19	at Toronto Argonauts	Rogers Centre	31–6	Loss	30,786	7–2
11	Aug 24	Calgary Stampeders	Molson Stadium	41–23	Loss	20,202	7–3
12	Sept 1	BC Lions	Molson Stadium	48–13	Loss	20,202	7–4
13	Bye						
14	Sept 16	at BC Lions	BC Place Stadium	36–20	Loss	35,971	7–5
15	Sept 24	Winnipeg Blue Bombers	Molson Stadium	17–14	Loss	20,202	7–6
16	Sept 29	at Winnipeg Blue Bombers	Canad Inns Stadium	30–23	Win	28,028	8–6
17	Oct 9	Saskatchewan Roughriders	Molson Stadium	35–8	Win	20,202	9–6
18	Oct 13	at Saskatchewan Roughriders	Mosaic Stadium	27–26	Loss	25,329	9–7
19	Oct 21	Edmonton Eskimos	Olympic Stadium	30–20	Loss	45,607	9–8
20	Oct 28	at Toronto Argonauts	Rogers Centre	24–20	Win	38,123	10–8

# Games played with colour uniforms.
# Games played with white uniforms.
# Games played with alternate uniforms.
# Games played with alternate uniforms.

== Roster ==
2006 Montreal Alouettes final roster
Quarterbacks: 18 Marcus Brady; 13 Anthony Calvillo; 17 Nealon Greene; Running backs: 6 Avon Cobourne; 30 Dahrran Diedrick; 47 Robert Edwards; 5 Éric Lapointe; 34 Jeff Piercy; 35 Mike Vilimek; Receivers: 87 Thyron Anderson; 86 Ben Cahoon; 89 Shaun Diner; 80 Terrence Edwards; 88 Dave Stala; 81 Kerry Watkins; 10 O'Neil Wilson	Offensive linemen: 68 Bryan Chiu C; 57 Scott Flory G; 61 Luke Fritz T; 65 Paul Lambert G; 67 Dave Mudge T; 53 Uzooma Okeke T; Defensive linemen: 19 D. D. Acholonu DE; 78 Adriano Belli DT; 48 John Bowman DE; 45 Alain Kashama DE; 75 Ed Philion DT; 94 Dario Romero DT; 9 Anwar Stewart DE; 91 R-Kal Truluck DE	Linebackers: 25 Duane Butler; 93 Kai Ellis; 39 Louis Mackey; 38 Tim Strickland; 14 D'Wayne Taylor; Defensive backs: 37 Ricky Bell; 22 Étienne Boulay; 8 Lamont Brightful; 11 Chip Cox; 31 Mark Estelle; 1 Richard Karikari; 41 Clint Kent; 2 Davis Sanchez; Special teams: 15 Damon Duval K/P; 52 Chris Vrantsis LS	Reserve roster: 69 Paul Archer T/C; 4 Patrick Dorvélus LB; 99 Jerome Haywood DT; Injured list: 55 Ian Allen T; 24 Ashlan Davis WR; 43 Ryan Folk LB; 3 Sylvain Girard WR; 16 Ezra Landry WR; 12 Jesse Palmer QB; 20 Matthieu Proulx DB; Suspended: Nick Cameron RB; Scott McBrien QB; Italics indicate International player

== Playoffs ==
=== Schedule ===
Week	Game	Date	Opponent	Venue	Score	Result	Attendance
21	Bye						
22	East Final	Nov 12	Toronto Argonauts	Olympic Stadium	33–24	Win	35,607
23	Grey Cup	Nov 19	BC Lions	Canad Inns Stadium	25–14	Loss	44,786

# Games played with white uniforms.
# Games played with alternate uniforms.

=== Scotiabank East Final ===
Team	Q1	Q2	Q3	Q4	Total
Toronto Argonauts	3	0	7	14	24
Montreal Alouettes	3	13	14	3	33

=== Grey Cup ===
Team	Q1	Q2	Q3	Q4	Total
Montreal Alouettes	0	3	9	2	14
BC Lions	9	10	0	6	25

== Awards ==
=== 2006 CFL All-Star Selections ===
- Scott Flory – Offensive Guard

=== 2006 CFL Eastern All-Star Selections ===
- Anthony Calvillo – Quarterback
- Ben Cahoon – Receiver
- Kerry Watkins – Receiver
- Robert Edwards – Running Back
- Scott flory – Offensive Guard
- Bryan Chiu – Centre
- Ed Philion – Defensive Tackle
- Timothy Strickland – Linebacker
- Damon Duval – Placekicker
