= 2007 Montreal Alouettes season =

Canadian football team season

- Head coach: Jim Popp
- Home stadium: Molson Stadium

Results
- Record: 8–10
- Division place: 3rd, East
- Playoffs: Lost East Semi-Final

Uniform

The 2007 Montreal Alouettes finished third place in the East Division in 2007. Jim Popp decided to remain as head coach rather than hire a replacement for Don Matthews, who unexpectedly resigned the previous season. The results were unexpected as the Alouettes endured their first losing season since rejoining the league in 1996. In October 2007, quarterback Anthony Calvillo's wife was diagnosed with B-cell lymphoma and non-Hodgkin's cancer of the lymph glands or nodes; Calvillo took indefinite leave of absence from the team to be with his wife. The Alouettes appeared in the East Semi-Final with backup quarterback Marcus Brady, losing to the Winnipeg Blue Bombers and putting an end to a disappointing season.

== Offseason ==
=== CFL draft ===
Round	Pick	Player	Position	School/Club team
1	7	Richard Yalowski	OL	Calgary
2	15	Darryl Conrad	T	Manitoba
3	18 (via Edmonton)	Chris Van Zeyl	DL	McMaster
3	19 (via Hamilton via Winnipeg)	Brian Jones	OL	Windsor Lancers
3	23	Donovan Alexander	DB	North Dakota
4	31	James Judges	DE	Buffalo
6	47	Braden Smith	QB	UBC

=== Preseason ===
Week	Date	Opponent	Venue	Score	Result	Attendance	Record
A	June 9	at Toronto Argonauts	Rogers Centre	27–13	Loss	18,156	0–1
C	June 21	Toronto Argonauts	Molson Stadium	34–26	Win	20,202	1–1

# Games played with white uniforms.

== Regular season ==
=== Season standings ===
East Division
Pos	Team	Pld	W	L	T	PF	PA	PD	Pts
1	Toronto Argonauts (C, Q)	18	11	7	0	440	336	+104	22
2	Winnipeg Blue Bombers (Q)	18	10	7	1	439	404	+35	21
3	Montreal Alouettes (Q)	18	8	10	0	398	433	−35	16
4	Hamilton Tiger-Cats	18	3	15	0	315	514	−199	6

Source: "2007 Regular Season Standings". Canadian Football League. Archived from the original on 2008-09-21.
(C) First round bye; (Q) Qualified for playoffs

=== Season schedule ===
Week	Date	Opponent	Venue	Score	Result	Attendance	Record
1	June 29	Saskatchewan Roughriders	Molson Stadium	16–7	Loss	20,202	0–1
2	July 5	at Winnipeg Blue Bombers	Canad Inns Stadium	32–23	Loss	29,533	0–2
3	July 14	at Hamilton Tiger-Cats	Ivor Wynne Stadium	29–20	Win	21,542	1–2
4	July 19	Winnipeg Blue Bombers	Molson Stadium	20–18	Loss	20,202	1–3
5	July 26	at Toronto Argonauts	Rogers Centre	26–13	Win	31,097	2–3
6	Aug 2	Toronto Argonauts	Molson Stadium	29–27	Win	20,202	3–3
7	Aug 9	Calgary Stampeders	Molson Stadium	30–18	Win	20,202	4–3
8	Bye						
9	Aug 25	Hamilton Tiger-Cats	Molson Stadium	27–9	Win	20,202	5–3
10	Aug 31	at BC Lions	BC Place Stadium	46–14	Loss	32,115	5–4
11	Sept 9	BC Lions	Molson Stadium	32–14	Win	20,202	6–4
12	Sept 14	at Edmonton Eskimos	Commonwealth Stadium	47–28	Loss	36,280	6–5
13	Sept 23	Edmonton Eskimos	Molson Stadium	16–10	Loss	20,202	6–6
14	Sept 29	at Saskatchewan Roughriders	Mosaic Stadium	33–22	Loss	28,800	6–7
15	Oct 8	Hamilton Tiger-Cats	Molson Stadium	27–19	Win	20,202	7–7
16	Oct 12	at Toronto Argonauts	Rogers Centre	35–17	Loss	31,416	7–8
17	Oct 20	Toronto Argonauts	Olympic Stadium	16–9	Loss	44,510	7–9
18	Oct 27	at Calgary Stampeders	McMahon Stadium	33–32	Win	29,247	8–9
19	Nov 2	at Winnipeg Blue Bombers	Canad Inns Stadium	20–17	Loss	23,744	8–10

# Games played with colour uniforms.
# Games played with white uniforms.
# Games played with alternate uniforms.

== Roster ==
2007 Montreal Alouettes final roster
Quarterbacks: 8 Marcus Brady; 16 Jason Maas; 18 Will Proctor; Running backs: 7 Kerry Carter; 6 Avon Cobourne; 30 Dahrran Diedrick; 33 Jarrett Payton; Receivers: 86 Ben Cahoon; 1 Ashlan Davis; 80 Éric Deslauriers; 82 Danny Desriveaux; 87 Brad Smith; 84 Elijah Thurmon; 81 Kerry Watkins	Offensive linemen: 68 Bryan Chiu C; 57 Scott Flory G; 61 Luke Fritz T; 65 Paul Lambert G; 67 Dave Mudge T; Defensive linemen: 48 John Bowman DE; 45 Alain Kashama DE; 94 Dario Romero DT; 96 Randy Spencer DT; 9 Anwar Stewart DE; 36 Eric Wilson DT; Special teams: 15 Damon Duval K/P; 52 Chris Vrantsis LS	Linebackers: 43 Khalid Abdullah; 11 Chip Cox; 93 Kai Ellis; 40 Diamond Ferri; 12 T. J. Hill; 46 Walter Spencer; Defensive backs: 22 Étienne Boulay; 24 Randee Drew; 31 Mark Estelle; 0 Shawn Gallant; 23 Bashir Levingston; 5 Pascal Masson; 25 Coby Rhinehart; 2 Davis Sanchez; Reserve roster: 85 Brian Bratton WR; 17 Jesse Hendrix DB; 51 Cory Huclack LB; 39 Louis Mackey LB; 54 Jeff Perrett T	Injured list: 10 Brad Banks QB; 59 Josh Bourke T; 13 Anthony Calvillo QB; -- Steve Charbonneau DT; 95 DeVone Claybrooks DT; 89 Shaun Diner SB; 4 Patrick Dorvélus LB; 19 S. J. Green WR; 21 Mike Imoh RB; -- Bruce Perry RB; 20 Matthieu Proulx DB; 55 Skip Seagraves T; 88 Dave Stala SB; 38 Tim Strickland LB; 14 D'Wayne Taylor LB; 35 Mike Vilimek FB; Suspended: Yves Bériault WR; Nick Cameron RB; Syvelle Newton QB; Italics indicate American player

== Playoffs ==
=== Schedule ===
Week	Game	Date	Opponent	Venue	Score	Result	Attendance
20	East Semi-Final	Nov 11	at Winnipeg Blue Bombers	Canad Inns Stadium	24–22	Loss	22,843

# Games played with white uniforms.

=== East Semi-Final ===
Date and time: Saturday, November 11, 1:00 PM Eastern Standard Time
Venue: Canad Inns Stadium, Winnipeg, Manitoba

Team	Q1	Q2	Q3	Q4	Total
Montreal Alouettes	0	16	3	3	22
Winnipeg Blue Bombers	7	3	7	7	24

== Awards ==
=== 2007 CFL All-Star Selections ===
- OG – Scott Flory, 2007 CFL All-Star
- P – Damon Duval, 2007 CFL All-Star

=== 2007 CFL Eastern All-Star Selections ===
- WR – Ben Cahoon, 2007 CFL Eastern All-Star
- OG – Scott Flory, 2007 CFL Eastern All-Star
- P – Damon Duval, 2007 CFL Eastern All-Star
- DB – Randee Drew, 2007 CFL Eastern All-Star

=== 2007 Intergold CFLPA All-Star Selections ===
- OG – Scott Flory, 2007 Intergold CFLPA All-Star
- P – Damon Duval, 2007Intergold CFLPA All-Star
