= 2006 Saskatchewan Roughriders season =

CFL team season

- General manager: Roy Shivers 4–5; Eric Tillman 5–4
- Head coach: Danny Barrett
- Home stadium: Mosaic Stadium at Taylor Field

Results
- Record: 9–9
- Division place: 3rd, West
- Playoffs: Lost West Final
- Team MOP: Kenton Keith
- Team MOC: Scott Schultz
- Team MOR: Luca Congi

Uniform

The 2006 Saskatchewan Roughriders finished third place in the West Division with a 9–9 record. They appeared in the West Final where they lost to the eventual Grey Cup champions BC Lions.

== Offseason ==
=== CFL draft ===
Round	Pick	Player	Position	School/Club team
1	3	Andy Fantuz	Slotback	Western
2	12	Luca Congi	Placekicker	Simon Fraser
3	20	Chris Cowan	Offensive Lineman	Saint Mary's
3	22	Tristan Clovis	Linebacker	McMaster
4	29	Peter Hogarth	Offensive Lineman	McMaster
5	37	Jesse Alexander	Linebacker	Wilfrid Laurier
6	45	Stephen Hughes	Running back	Calgary

=== Preseason ===
Week	Date	Opponent	Score	Result	Attendance
A	Sat, June 3	vs. Edmonton Eskimos	14–8	Win	25,114
B	Fri, June 9	at Edmonton Eskimos	22–7	Win	27,840

== Regular season ==
=== Season standings ===
West Division
Pos	Team	Pld	W	L	T	PF	PA	PD	Pts
1	BC Lions (Q)	18	13	5	0	555	355	+200	26
2	Calgary Stampeders (Q)	18	10	8	0	477	426	+51	20
3	Saskatchewan Roughriders (Q)	18	9	9	0	465	434	+31	18
4	Edmonton Eskimos	18	7	11	0	399	468	−69	14

Source: "2006 Regular Season Standings". Canadian Football League. Archived from the original on 2008-09-21.
(Q) Qualified for playoffs

=== Season schedule ===
Week	Date	Opponent	Score	Result	Attendance	Record
1	Fri, June 16	at BC Lions	45–28	Loss	27,539	0–1
2	Sun, June 25	vs. BC Lions	32–24	Win	21,082	1–1
3	Bye					
4	Sat, July 8	vs. Calgary Stampeders	53–36	Loss	23,942	1–2
5	Fri, July 14	at BC Lions	29–28	Win	28,513	2–2
6	Sat, July 22	vs. Toronto Argonauts	25–23	Loss	24,967	2–3
7	Sat, July 29	vs. Calgary Stampeders	19–9	Win	23,107	3–3
8	Sat, Aug 5	at Calgary Stampeders	23–7	Loss	34,319	3–4
9	Fri, Aug 11	at Edmonton Eskimos	24–18	Loss	39,599	3–5
10	Sat, Aug 19	vs. Hamilton Tiger-Cats	46–15	Win	22,820	4–5
11	Sat, Aug 26	at Hamilton Tiger-Cats	51–8	Win	26,564	5–5
12	Sun, Sept 3	vs. Winnipeg Blue Bombers	39–12	Win	30,900	6–5
13	Sun, Sept 10	at Winnipeg Blue Bombers	27–23	Loss	30,026	6–6
14	Bye					
15	Sun, Sept 24	vs. BC Lions	23–20(OT)	Win	27,592	7–6
16	Sat, Sept 30	vs. Edmonton Eskimos	30–25	Loss	27,894	7–7
17	Mon, Oct 9	at Montreal Alouettes	35–8	Loss	20,202	7–8
18	Fri, Oct 13	vs. Montreal Alouettes	27–26	Win	25,329	8–8
19	Fri, Oct 20	at Toronto Argonauts	13–9	Win	30,323	9–8
20	Fri, Oct 27	at Edmonton Eskimos	20–18	Loss	31,779	9–9

# Games played with primary home uniforms.
# Games played with primary white uniforms.
# Games played with black uniforms.

== Roster ==
2006 Saskatchewan Roughriders final roster
Quarterbacks: 12 Ian Butler; 8 Marcus Crandell; 4 Kerry Joseph; Running backs: 27 Dominique Dorsey; 35 Cory Hathaway; 32 Neal Hughes; 28 Kenton Keith; Receivers: 1 Jason Armstead; 88 Matt Dominguez; 83 Andy Fantuz; 6 Jason French; 2 Corey Grant; 87 Yo Murphy; 82 Ibrahim Tounkara	Offensive linemen: 69 Freddie Childress G; 59 Jocelyn Frenette G/C; 68 Andrew Greene G; 66 Rob Lazeo C/G; 60 Gene Makowsky T; 54 Jeremy O'Day C; 53 Charles Thomas T; Defensive linemen: 98 Nathan Davis DT; 46 Kitwana Jones DE; 79 Terrell Jurineack DE; 95 Luc Mullinder DT; 41 Fred Perry DE; 96 Scott Schultz DT; Special teams: 10 Luca Congi K/P	Linebackers: 9 Reggie Hunt; 47 Maurice Lloyd; 49 Mike Mahoney; 45 Mike McCullough; 24 Jackie Mitchell; Defensive backs: 5 Davin Bush; 22 Dustin Cherniawski; 37 Tristan Clovis; 29 Eddie Davis; 26 Almondo Curry; 19 James Johnson; 3 Omarr Morgan; 20 Kennedy Nkeyasen; 21 Rontarius Robinson	Reserve roster: 25 Shermar Bracey RB; 43 Tim Fleiszer DE; 67 Matt O'Meara G/T; 13 T. J. Stancil LB; Injured list: 51 Marcus Adams DT; 14 Darian Durant QB; 77 Dwan Epps DE; 15 Lance Frazier DB; -- Scott Gordon DB; 63 Antonio Hall G; 89 Jamel Richardson SB; 33 Chris Szarka FB; 84 Craig Yeast WR; Italics indicate American player

== Awards and records ==
=== CFL All-Star Selections ===
- Eddie Davis, Defensive Back
- Gene Makowsky, Offensive Tackle
- Jeremy O'Day, Centre
- Fred Perry, Defensive End

=== Western All-Star Selections ===
- Eddie Davis, Defensive Back
- Matt Dominguez, Receiver
- Reggie Hunt, Linebacker
- Kenton Keith, Running Back
- Gene Makowsky, Offensive Tackle
- Jeremy O'Day, Centre
- Fred Perry, Defensive End

== Playoffs ==
=== West Semi-Final ===
Team	Q1	Q2	Q3	Q4	Total
Saskatchewan Roughriders	3	9	8	10	30
Calgary Stampeders	4	17	0	0	21

=== West Final ===
Team	Q1	Q2	Q3	Q4	Total
Saskatchewan Roughriders	3	1	4	10	18
BC Lions	3	26	3	13	45
