= 2005 CIS football season =

- Duration: September 1, 2005 – October 29, 2005
- Hardy Cup champions: Saskatchewan Huskies
- Yates Cup champions: Wilfrid Laurier Golden Hawks
- Dunsmore Cup champions: Laval Rouge et Or
- Loney Bowl champions: Acadia Axemen
- Mitchell Bowl champions: Saskatchewan Huskies
- Uteck Bowl champions: Wilfrid Laurier Golden Hawks

Vanier Cup
- Date: December 3, 2005
- Venue: Ivor Wynne Stadium, Hamilton
- Champions: Wilfrid Laurier Golden Hawks

CIS football seasons seasons
- 2004 2006

The 2005 CIS football season began on September 1 2005, and concluded with the 41st Vanier Cup national championship on December 3 at Ivor Wynne Stadium in Hamilton, Ontario, with the Wilfrid Laurier Golden Hawks winning their second championship. Twenty-seven universities across Canada competed in CIS football this season, the highest level of amateur play in Canadian football, under the auspices of Canadian Interuniversity Sport (CIS).

== Awards and records ==
=== Awards ===
- Hec Crighton Trophy – Andy Fantuz, Western Ontario
- Presidents' Trophy – Patrick Donovan, Concordia
- Russ Jackson Award – Dan Parker, Mount Allison
- J. P. Metras Trophy – Dominic Picard, Laval
- Peter Gorman Trophy – Martin Gagné, Montreal

== All-Canadian team ==
=== First Team ===
Offence
Ryan Pyear, QB, Laurier
Daryl Stephenson, RB, Windsor
David Stevens, RB, Saskatchewan
Andrew Fantuz, WR, Western
Ivan Birungi, WR, Acadia
Arjei Franklin, SB, Windsor
J-F Romeo, SB, Laval
Dominic Picard, C, Laval
Adam Krajewski, G, Simon Fraser
Kyle Koch, G, McMaster
Chris Sutherland, T, Saskatchewan
Chris Best, T, Waterloo
Defence
Martin Gagné, DE, Montréal
Kyle Markin, DE, Acadia
Michaël Jean-Louis, DT, Laval
Ryan Gottselig, DT, Saskatchewan
Patrick Donovan, LB, Concordia
Jason Pottinger, LB, McMaster
Stephen Wilson, LB, Regina
Eric Nielsen, CB, Acadia
Modibo Sidibe, CB, Concordia
Ian Logan, HB, Laurier
Sammy Okpro, HB, Concordia
Jason Milne, FS, Alberta
Special Teams
Mike Renaud, P, Concordia
Warren Kean, K, Concordia

=== Second Team ===
Offense
Scott Syvret, QB, Concordia
Nick Cameron, RB, Laurier
Joseph Mroué, RB, Montréal
Andrew Ginther, WR, Alberta
Jeff Keegan, WR, Guelph
Vaughan Swart, SB, McMaster
Mike Lindstrom, SB, UBC
Kevin Kelly, C, Ottawa
Adam Rogers, G, Acadia
Woodly Jean, G, Montreal
J.F. Morin-Roberge, T, Montreal
Derek Armstrong, T, StFX
Defence
Brandon Keks, DE, Laurier
Dan Federkeil, DE, Calgary
Miguel Robede, DT, Laval
Simon Patrick, DT, Manitoba
David Lowry, LB, Alberta
Marc Trépanier, LB, Montréal
Matt Harding, LB, Mount Allison
Anthony Plante-Ajah, CB, Ottawa
Joel Lipinski, CB, Regina
Alexandre Vendette, HB, Laval
Steve Boyko, HB, Alberta
Jeff Smeaton, FS, Laurier
Special Teams
Luca Congi, P, Simon Fraser
Brian Devlin, K, Laurier

== Results ==
=== Regular season standings ===
Note: GP = Games Played, W = Wins, L = Losses, OTL = Overtime Losses, PF = Points For, PA = Points Against, Pts = Points

Canada West
| Team | GP | W | L | OTL | PF | PA | Pts |
|---|---|---|---|---|---|---|---|
| **Saskatchewan** | 8 | 8 | 0 | 0 | 294 | 96 | 16 |
| **Alberta** | 8 | 7 | 1 | 0 | 226 | 149 | 14 |
| **Manitoba** | 8 | 4 | 4 | 1 | 228 | 172 | 9 |
| **UBC** | 8 | 4 | 4 | 0 | 210 | 200 | 8 |
| Regina | 8 | 3 | 5 | 0 | 188 | 276 | 8 |
| Calgary | 8 | 2 | 6 | 0 | 146 | 259 | 4 |
| Simon Fraser | 8 | 0 | 8 | 1 | 160 | 300 | 1 |

Ontario
| Team | GP | W | L | OTL | PF | PA | Pts |
|---|---|---|---|---|---|---|---|
| **Laurier** | 8 | 8 | 0 | 0 | 330 | 114 | 16 |
| **Western** | 8 | 6 | 2 | 1 | 371 | 142 | 13 |
| **Ottawa** | 8 | 6 | 2 | 0 | 305 | 137 | 12 |
| **McMaster** | 8 | 5 | 3 | 0 | 283 | 209 | 10 |
| **Windsor** | 8 | 4 | 4 | 0 | 250 | 226 | 8 |
| **Guelph** | 8 | 3 | 5 | 1 | 182 | 195 | 7 |
| Queen's | 8 | 3 | 5 | 0 | 196 | 223 | 6 |
| York | 8 | 3 | 5 | 0 | 113 | 294 | 6 |
| Waterloo | 8 | 2 | 6 | 0 | 139 | 302 | 4 |
| Toronto | 8 | 0 | 8 | 1 | 126 | 432 | 1 |

Quebec
| Team | GP | W | L | PF | PA | Pts |
|---|---|---|---|---|---|---|
| **Laval** | 8 | 8 | 0 | 305 | 75 | 16 |
| **Concordia** | 8 | 6 | 2 | 235 | 134 | 12 |
| **Montreal** | 8 | 6 | 2 | 229 | 158 | 12 |
| **Sherbrooke** | 8 | 4 | 4 | 175 | 227 | 8 |
| Bishop's | 8 | 1 | 7 | 131 | 233 | 2 |
| McGill | 8 | 1 | 7 | 120 | 133 | 2 |

Atlantic
| Team | GP | W | L | PF | PA | Pts |
|---|---|---|---|---|---|---|
| **Acadia** | 8 | 5 | 3 | 276 | 135 | 10 |
| **StFX** | 8 | 5 | 3 | 219 | 189 | 10 |
| **Saint Mary's** | 8 | 4 | 4 | 225 | 175 | 8 |
| Mount Allison | 8 | 0 | 8 | 23 | 379 | 0 |

Teams in bold have earned playoff berths.

=== Top 10 ===
CIS Top 10 Rankings
| | 01 | 02 | 03 | 04 | 05 | 06 | 07 | 08 | 09 | 10 |
|---|---|---|---|---|---|---|---|---|---|---|
| Acadia Axemen | 10 | NR | NR | NR | NR | NR | NR | NR | NR | 10 |
| Alberta Golden Bears | 4 | 4 | 4 | 4 | 4 | 4 | 5 | 5 | 5 | 4 |
| Bishop's Gaiters | NR | NR | NR | NR | NR | NR | NR | NR | NR | NR |
| Calgary Dinos | NR | NR | NR | NR | NR | NR | NR | NR | NR | NR |
| Concordia Stingers | NR | 10 | 10 | 8 | 8 | 8 | 6 | 7 | 7 | 7 |
| Guelph Gryphons | NR | NR | NR | NR | NR | NR | NR | NR | NR | NR |
| Laurier Golden Hawks | 3 | 3 | 3 | 3 | 3 | 3 | 3 | 3 | 3 | 3 |
| Laval Rouge et Or | 1 | 1 | 1 | 1 | 1 | 1 | 1 | 1 | 1 | 1 |
| Manitoba Bisons | NR | NR | 9 | 7 | 7 | 8 | 10 | 9 | 9 | 9 |
| McGill Redmen | NR | NR | NR | NR | NR | NR | NR | NR | NR | NR |
| McMaster Marauders | 7 | 6 | 7 | NR | 9 | 9 | NR | NR | NR | NR |
| Montreal Carabins | 5 | 8 | 6 | 5 | 5 | 5 | 4 | 4 | 4 | 5 |
| Mount Allison Mounties | NR | NR | NR | NR | NR | NR | NR | NR | NR | NR |
| Ottawa Gee-Gees | NR | NR | NR | NR | NR | NR | 9 | 6 | 6 | 6 |
| Queen's Golden Gaels | NR | NR | NR | NR | NR | NR | NR | NR | NR | NR |
| Regina Rams | NR | NR | NR | NR | NR | NR | NR | NR | NR | NR |
| Saint Mary's Huskies | 6 | 5 | 5 | 10 | NR | NR | NR | 10 | NR | NR |
| Saskatchewan Huskies | 2 | 2 | 2 | 2 | 2 | 2 | 2 | 2 | 2 | 2 |
| Sherbrooke Vert et Or | NR | NR | NR | NR | NR | NR | NR | NR | NR | NR |
| St. Francis Xavier X-Men | NR | NR | NR | 9 | 10 | 10 | 8 | NR | 10 | NR |
| Simon Fraser Clan | NR | NR | NR | NR | NR | NR | NR | NR | NR | NR |
| Toronto Varsity Blues | NR | NR | NR | NR | NR | NR | NR | NR | NR | NR |
| UBC Thunderbirds | 9 | 9 | NR | NR | NR | NR | NR | NR | NR | NR |
| Waterloo Warriors | NR | NR | NR | NR | NR | NR | NR | NR | NR | NR |
| Western Mustangs | 8 | 7 | 8 | 6 | 6 | 6 | 7 | 8 | 8 | 8 |
| Windsor Lancers | NR | NR | NR | NR | NR | NR | NR | NR | NR | NR |
| York Lions | NR | NR | NR | NR | NR | NR | NR | NR | NR | NR |

NR = Not ranked.

=== Championships ===
The Vanier Cup is played between the champions of the Mitchell Bowl and the Uteck Bowl, the national semi-final games. In 2005, according to the rotating schedule, the winners of the Canada West conference Hardy Trophy meet the Dunsmore Cup Quebec champion for the Mitchell Bowl. The winners of the Atlantic conference Loney Bowl championship travel to the Ontario conference's Yates Cup championship team for the Uteck Bowl.
