= 2006 Hamilton Tiger-Cats season =

Season of Canadian Football League team the Hamilton Tiger-Cats

- General manager: Rob Katz - 2–9; Marcel Desjardins - 2–5
- Head coach: Greg Marshall - 0–4; Ron Lancaster - 4–10 (Interim)
- Home stadium: Ivor Wynne Stadium

Results
- Record: 4–14
- Division place: 4th, East
- Playoffs: Did not qualify
- Team MOP: Tay Cody
- Team MOC: Rob Hitchcock
- Team MOR: Lawrence Gordon

Uniform

The 2006 Hamilton Tiger-Cats season was the 49th season for the team in the Canadian Football League (CFL) and their 57th overall. The Tiger-Cats finished in fourth place in the East Division with a 4–14 record and missed the playoffs. Head coach Greg Marshall was fired after the first four games of the season and Ron Lancaster took over as interim head coach for the remaining 14 games.

== Offseason ==
=== CFL draft ===
Rd	Pick	Player	Position	School
1	8	Cedric Gagne-Marcoux	OL	Central Florida
2	9	Jermaine Reid	DL	Akron
2	11	Peter Dyakowski	OL	LSU
3	18	Shawn Mayne	DE	Connecticut
4	28	Chris Sutherland	OL	Saskatchewan
5	35	Michael Roberts	CB	Ohio State

== Preseason ==
Week	Date	Opponent	Score	Result	Attendance	Record
A	June 2	at Toronto Argonauts	31–3	Win	21,469	1–0
B	June 9	Toronto Argonauts	21–11	Win	25,398	2–0

== Regular season ==
=== Season standings ===
East Division
Team	GP	W	L	T	PF	PA	Pts	
Montreal Alouettes	18	10	8	0	451	431	20	Details
Toronto Argonauts	18	10	8	0	359	343	20	Details
Winnipeg Blue Bombers	18	9	9	0	362	408	18	Details
Hamilton Tiger-Cats	18	4	14	0	292	495	8	Details

=== Season schedule ===
Week	Date	Opponent	Score	Result	Attendance	Record
1	June 17	at Toronto Argonauts	27–17	Loss	27,689	0–1
2	June 24	Montreal Alouettes	32–14	Loss	27,911	0–2
3	June 29	at Calgary Stampeders	23–22	Loss	28,396	0–3
4	July 6	at Montreal Alouettes	27–21	Loss	20,202	0–4
5	July 14	Calgary Stampeders	20–17	Win	26,944	1–4
6	July 20	at Montreal Alouettes	41–38	Loss	20,202	1–5
7	July 28	Winnipeg Blue Bombers	29–0	Loss	27,027	1–6
8	August 4	at Winnipeg Blue Bombers	26–11	Win	26,521	2–6
9	August 12	Toronto Argonauts	20–2	Loss	29,010	2–7
10	August 19	at Saskatchewan Roughriders	46–15	Loss	22,820	2–8
11	August 26	Saskatchewan Roughriders	51–8	Loss	26,564	2–9
12	Sept 4	Toronto Argonauts	40–6	Loss	28,891	2–10
13	Sept 9	at Toronto Argonauts	11–9	Loss	26,212	2–11
14	Sept 16	Edmonton Eskimos	27–22	Win	25,107	3–11
15	Sept 22	at Edmonton Eskimos	20–18	Win	36,046	4–11
16	Sept 30	BC Lions	28–8	Loss	24,163	4–12
17	Bye					
18	Oct 15	Winnipeg Blue Bombers	29–22	Loss	24,955	4–13
19	Oct 21	at BC Lions	26–16	Loss	31,294	4–14
20	Bye					

== Player stats ==
=== Passing ===
Player	Att.	Comp	%	Yards	TD	INT	Rating

=== Rushing ===
Player	Att.	Yards	Avg.	TD	Fumbles

=== Receiving ===
Player	No.	Yards	Avg.	Long	TD

== Roster ==
2006 Hamilton Tiger-Cats final roster
Quarterbacks: 12 Kevin Eakin; 11 Jason Maas; 17 Richie Williams; Running backs: 25 Kojo Aidoo; 3 Corey Holmes; 28 Jesse Lumsden; 33 Julian Radlein; Receivers: 81 Iain Fleming; 82 D. J. Flick; 87 DaVon Fowlkes; 18 Mike Morreale; 80 Brock Ralph; 2 Terry Vaughn	Offensive linemen: 65 Damion Cook T; 64 Ryan Donnelly T; 60 Fabio Filice G; 56 Carl Gourgues G; 62 Marwan Hage C; 59 Wayne Smith G; 69 Jonta Woodard T; Defensive linemen: 97 Anthony Collier DE; 99 James Cotton DE; 70 Roger Dunbrack DT; 91 Bernard Holsey DT; 54 Steve Josue DE; 92 Demetrios Walker DE; 90 Clinton Wayne DT	Linebackers: 32 JoJuan Armour; 39 Agustín Barrenechea; 36 David Dixon; 42 Rob Hitchcock; 44 Ray Mariuz; 38 Matt Robichaud; Defensive backs: 19 Sandy Beveridge; 31 Jykine Bradley; 16 Matt Clark; 4 Tay Cody; 24 Renard Cox; 29 Lawrence Gordon; 15 Tad Kornegay; 1 Wayne Shaw; 43 Kevin Timothee	Special teams: 30 Jamie Boreham K; 6 Pat Fleming; 16 Mark Myers K; Reserve roster: 5 Anthony Davis RB; 8 Kamau Peterson WR; 67 Marc Pilon DT; Injured list: 49 Tim Cheatwood DE; 66 Pascal Cheron T; 22 Phillip Gauthier DB; 52 George Hudson C/G; 20 Airabin Justin DB; 94 DeVonte Peterson DE; 9 Josh Ranek RB; 23 Sam Young DB; Suspended: 27 Jason Goss DB; -- Brian Oddi LB; Italics indicate American players

== Awards and records ==
=== 2006 CFL All-Stars ===
- No players selected

=== Eastern Division All-Star Selections ===
- Tay Cody - Defensive Back
