= 2006 Winnipeg Blue Bombers season =

Canadian football team season

- Head coach: Doug Berry
- Home stadium: Canad Inns Stadium

Results
- Record: 9–9
- Division place: 3rd, East
- Playoffs: Lost East Semi-Final

Uniform

The 2006 Winnipeg Blue Bombers finished with a 9–9 record and made the playoffs for the first time since 2003. Due to the suspension of the Ottawa Renegades just prior to the 2006 season, the Blue Bombers switched to the East Division. The team attempted to win their 11th Grey Cup championship, but they lost in the East Semi-Final versus the Toronto Argonauts.

== Offseason ==
=== CFL draft ===
Round	Pick	Player	Position	School/Club team

== Regular season ==
=== Season standings ===
East Division
Pos	Team	Pld	W	L	T	PF	PA	PD	Pts
1	Montreal Alouettes (C, Q)	18	10	8	0	451	431	+20	20
2	Toronto Argonauts (Q)	18	10	8	0	359	343	+16	20
3	Winnipeg Blue Bombers (Q)	18	9	9	0	362	408	−46	18
4	Hamilton Tiger-Cats	18	4	14	0	292	495	−203	8

Source: "2006 Regular Season Standings". Canadian Football League. Archived from the original on 2008-09-21.
(C) First round bye; (Q) Qualified for playoffs

=== Season schedule ===
Week	Date	Opponent	Score	Result	Attendance	Record
1	June 16	at Montreal Alouettes	27–17	Loss	20,202	0–1
2	June 23	vs. Toronto Argonauts	16–9	Win	26,524	1–1
3	July 1	vs. Edmonton Eskimos	46–10	Win	23,521	2–1
4	July 8	at Toronto Argonauts	24–17	Win	26,304	3–1
5	July 15	vs. Montreal Alouettes	44–16	Loss	28,131	3–2
6	July 20	at Edmonton Eskimos	25–22	Win	37,611	4–2
7	July 28	at Hamilton Tiger-Cats	29–0	Win	27,027	5–2
8	Aug 4	vs. Hamilton Tiger-Cats	26–11	Loss	26,521	5–3
9	Aug 10	vs. BC Lions	32–5	Loss	25,033	5–4
10	Bye					5–4
11	Aug 25	vs. Toronto Argonauts	18–15	Loss	25,014	5–5
12	Sept 3	at Saskatchewan Roughriders	39–12	Loss	30,900	5–6
13	Sept 10	vs. Saskatchewan Roughriders	27–23	Win	30,026	6–6
14	Sept 15	at Calgary Stampeders	43–9	Loss	26,843	6–7
15	Sept 24	at Montreal Alouettes	17–14	Win	20,202	7–7
16	Sept 29	vs. Montreal Alouettes	23–20	Loss	28,028	7–8
17	Bye					7–8
18	Oct 15	at Hamilton Tiger-Cats	29–22	Win	24,955	8–8
19	Oct 21	vs. Calgary Stampeders	28–13	Win	30,092	9–8
20	Oct 28	at BC Lions	26–16	Loss	33,744	9–9

# Games played with primary home uniforms.
# Games played with primary white uniforms.
# Games played with gold alternate uniforms.

== Playoffs ==
=== East Semi-Final ===
Date and time: Sunday, November 5, 12:00 PM Central Standard Time
Venue: Rogers Centre, Toronto, Ontario

Team	Q1	Q2	Q3	Q4	Total
Winnipeg Blue Bombers	3	3	14	7	27
Toronto Argonauts	6	8	0	17	31

== Roster ==
2006 Winnipeg Blue Bombers final roster
Quarterbacks: 17 Brad Banks; 2 Ryan Dinwiddie; 5 Kevin Glenn; Running backs: 26 Graeme Bell; 21 Scott Regimbald; 1 Charles Roberts; Receivers: 83 Derick Armstrong; 84 Chris Brazzell; 81 Adam Eckert; 86 Arjei Franklin; 87 Albert Johnson; 85 Milt Stegall; 88 Jamie Stoddard	Offensive linemen: 67 Mike Abou-Mechrek T/G; 51 Aaron Fiacconi G/C; 57 Jermese Jones T; 60 Obby Khan C; 54 Matt Sheridan G/T; 59 Val St. Germain G; 69 Eric Wilson T; Defensive linemen: 90 Adrian Baird DE; 97 Doug Brown DT; 44 Tom Canada DE; 77 Jon Oosterhuis DT/DE; 98 Gavin Walls DE; 94 Ron Warner DT	Linebackers: 56 Stevie Baggs; 20 Donnavan Carter; 0 Ike Charlton; 23 Kyries Hebert; 42 Neil McKinlay; 51 Barrin Simpson; Defensive backs: 25 Robert Bean; 8 Greg Bearman; 4 Omar Evans; 2 William Fields; 22 Shawn Gallant; 31 Ian Logan; 3 Anthony Malbrough; 27 Kelly Malveaux; 10 Jazzmen Williams	Special teams: 50 Chris Cvetkovic LS; 7 Troy Westwood K/P; Reserve roster: 82 Kwame Cavil SB; 95 Cameron Legault DT; 53 Dominic Picard C; 9 Andrae Thurman SB; Injured list: 24 Gabriel Fulbright DB; 64 Dan Goodspeed T; 15 Ron Ockimey LB; 16 Stanford Samuels DB; Suspended: 89 Robert Baker WR; 64 Garrick Jones T; Italics indicate International player
