= 2007 Hamilton Tiger-Cats season =

Season of Canadian Football League team the Hamilton Tiger-Cats

- General manager: Marcel Desjardins
- Head coach: Charlie Taaffe
- Home stadium: Ivor Wynne Stadium

Results
- Record: 3–15
- Division place: 4th, East
- Playoffs: Did not qualify
- Team MOP: Zeke Moreno
- Team MOC: Jesse Lumsden
- Team MOR: Nick Setta

Uniform

The 2007 Hamilton Tiger-Cats season was the 50th season for the team in the Canadian Football League (CFL) and their 58th overall. The Tiger-Cats finished in fourth place in the East Division with a 3–15 record and missed the playoffs.

== Offseason ==
=== CFL draft ===
Rd	Pick	Player	Position	School
1	1	Chris Bauman	WR	Regina
1	4	J. P. Bekasiak	DL	Toledo
2	12	Jordan Rempel	OL	Saskatchewan
2	13	Eric Ince	OL	St. Mary's
4	25	Robert Pavlovic	TE	South Carolina
5	33	Chris Getzlaf	SB	Regina
5	36	Nick Kordic	DB	Western Ontario
6	41	Michael Gonclaves	DL	Toronto
6	44	Adam Kania	DE	St. Francis Xavier

== Preseason ==
Week	Date	Opponent	Score	Result	Attendance	Record
B	June 14	at Winnipeg Blue Bombers	35–23	Win	27,078	1–0
C	June 22	Winnipeg Blue Bombers	24–20	Win	20,153	2–0

== Regular season ==
=== Season standings ===
East Division
Team	GP	W	L	T	PF	PA	Pts	
Toronto Argonauts	18	11	7	0	440	336	22	Details
Winnipeg Blue Bombers	18	10	7	1	439	404	21	Details
Montreal Alouettes	18	8	10	0	398	433	16	Details
Hamilton Tiger-Cats	18	3	15	0	315	514	6	Details

=== Season schedule ===
Week	Date	Opponent	Score	Result	Attendance	Record
1	June 30	at Calgary Stampeders	37–9	Loss	29,103	0–1
2	July 7	Toronto Argonauts	30–5	Loss	28,198	0–2
3	July 14	Montreal Alouettes	29–20	Loss	21,542	0–3
4	July 19	at BC Lions	22–18	Loss	29,045	0–4
5	July 27	at Winnipeg Blue Bombers	36–18	Loss	29,533	0–5
6	Aug 3	Winnipeg Blue Bombers	43–22	Win	24,201	1–5
7	Aug 11	at Edmonton Eskimos	19–17	Loss	35,750	1–6
8	Bye					
9	Aug 25	at Montreal Alouettes	27–9	Loss	20,202	1–7
10	Sept 3	Toronto Argonauts	32–14	Loss	28,644	1–8
11	Sept 8	at Toronto Argonauts	35–22	Loss	28,279	1–9
12	Sept 15	Winnipeg Blue Bombers	34–4	Loss	21,205	1–10
13	Sept 21	Calgary Stampeders	24–20	Win	23,115	2–10
14	Sep 29	at Winnipeg Blue Bombers	21–19	Loss	27,102	2–11
15	Oct 8	at Montreal Alouettes	27–19	Loss	20,202	2–12
16	Oct 14	Saskatchewan Roughriders	40–23	Loss	22,167	2–13
17	Oct 21	at Saskatchewan Roughriders	38–11	Loss	28,800	2–14
18	Oct 26	BC Lions	27–19	Loss	19,322	2–15
19	Nov 3	Edmonton Eskimos	21–19	Win	20,411	3–15

== Player stats ==
=== Passing ===
Player	Att.	Comp	%	Yards	TD	INT
Richie Williams	130	80	61.5%	852	6	3
Casey Printers	133	68	51.1%	774	1	4
Timmy Chang	89	42	47.2%	467	1	7

=== Rushing ===
Player	Carries	Yards	Avg.	TD
Jesse Lumsden	98	743	7.6	3
Terry Caulley	76	466	6.1	1
Anthony Davis	61	360	5.9	2
Richie Williams	32	169	5.3	0
Casey Printers	16	99	6.2	1
Brock Ralph	7	43	6.1	0
Timmy Chang	5	24	4.8	0
Julian Radlein	5	22	4.4	0
Nicholas Setta	1	12	12	1
Kori Dickerson	1	4	4	0
Jerome Davis	1	3	3	0
Antoine Bagwell	3	2	0.7	0
Chris Bauman	1	-11	-11	0

=== Receiving ===
Only players with over 100 receiving yards are shown.

Player	No.	Yards	Avg.	Long	TD

== Roster ==
2007 Hamilton Tiger-Cats final roster
Quarterbacks: 7 Timmy Chang; 17 Richie Williams; Running backs: 35 Antoine Bagwell; 30 Terry Caulley; 5 Anthony Davis; 34 Jeff Piercy; Receivers: 88 Jason Armstead; 87 Chris Bauman; 84 Nate Curry; 0 Kori Dickerson; 15 Jason French; 77 Jo Jo Walker; 82 Rashaun Woods	Offensive linemen: 60 Marko Cavka T; 64 Ryan Donnelly T; 53 Cedric Gagné-Marcoux G; 62 Marwan Hage C; 52 George Hudson G/C; 57 Eric Ince G; 69 Jonta Woodard T; Defensive linemen: 96 J. P. Bekasiak DT; 70 Roger Dunbrack DT; 93 Howard Hodges DE; 55 Charlton Keith DE; 91 Nautyn McKay-Loescher DE; 90 Clinton Wayne DT	Linebackers: 19 Sandy Beveridge; 47 Sasha Glavic; 6 Jamaica Jackson; 44 Ray Mariuz; 16 Zeke Moreno; 38 Matt Robichaud; Defensive backs: 31 Jykine Bradley; 21 Sir James Delgardo; 22 Phillip Gauthier; 29 Lawrence Gordon; 23 Michael Harden; 12 Richard Karikari; 26 David Lofton; 37 Jason Nedd; 27 Michael Roberts; 24 Tony Tiller	Special teams: 13 Nick Setta K/P; Reserve roster: 32 JoJuan Armour LB; 99 Jermaine Reid DT; Injured list: 20 Dwight Anderson DB; 66 Pascal Cheron T; 16 Matt Clark DB; 4 Tay Cody DB; 67 Peter Dyakowski G; 40 Ryan Glasper LB; 28 Jesse Lumsden RB; 1 Casey Printers QB; 33 Julian Radlein FB; 80 Brock Ralph WR; 81 Kendrick Starling WR; Italics indicate American players

== Awards and records ==
=== 2007 CFL All-Stars ===
- Nick Setta, K – CFL All-Star
- Zeke Moreno, LB – CFL All-Star

=== Eastern Division All-Star Selections ===
- Jesse Lumsden, RB – CFL Eastern All-Star
- Marwan Hage, C – CFL Eastern All-Star
- Nick Setta, K – CFL Eastern All-Star
- Zeke Moreno, LB – CFL Eastern All-Star
