= 2006 CFL draft =

Canadian football draft

General information
- Sport: Football
- Date: April 20

Overview
- 50 total selections
- First selection: Adam Braidwood
- Most selections: Edmonton Eskimos (8)
- Fewest selections: Winnipeg Blue Bombers (4)

The 2006 CFL draft took place on Thursday, April 20, 2006. 50 players were chosen from among eligible players from Canadian Universities across the country, as well as Canadian players playing in the NCAA. Trades that occurred with the now defunct Ottawa Renegades were still valid, adding picks to both the second and fourth rounds, but any selections that were still held by the Renegades were justly skipped. Of the 50 draft selections, 26 players were drafted from Canadian Interuniversity Sport institutions.

== Round one ==
= CFL Division All-Star	= CFL All-Star	= Hall of Famer

Pick #	CFL team	Player	Position	School
1	Edmonton Eskimos (via Hamilton)	Adam Braidwood	DE	Washington State
2	BC Lions (via Winnipeg)	Jay Pottinger	LB	McMaster
3	Saskatchewan Roughriders	Andrew Fantuz	SB	Western Ontario
4	BC Lions (via Calgary)	Ricky Foley	LB	York
5	Toronto Argonauts	Daniel Federkeil	DL	Calgary
6	BC Lions	Dean Valli	OL	Simon Fraser
7	Montreal Alouettes	Eric Deslauriers	WR	Eastern Michigan
8	Hamilton Tiger-Cats (via Edmonton)	Cedric Gagne-Marcoux	OL	Central Florida

== Round two ==
= CFL Division All-Star	= CFL All-Star	= Hall of Famer

Pick #	CFL team	Player	Position	School
9	Hamilton Tiger-Cats	Jermaine Reid	DL	Akron
10	Toronto Argonauts (via Winnipeg)	Leron Mitchell	DB	Western Ontario
11	Hamilton Tiger-Cats (via Ottawa)	Peter Dyakowski	OL	Louisiana State
12	Saskatchewan Roughriders	Luca Congi	K	Simon Fraser
13	Calgary Stampeders	Jon Cornish	RB	Kansas
14	Toronto Argonauts (via Winnipeg via Toronto)	Aaron Wagner	LB	Brigham Young
15	BC Lions	Jon Hameister-Ries	OL	Tulsa
16	Montreal Alouettes	Etienne Boulay	DB	New Hampshire
17	Edmonton Eskimos	Jason Nugent	DB	Rutgers

== Round three ==
= CFL Division All-Star	= CFL All-Star	= Hall of Famer

Pick #	CFL team	Player	Position	School
18	Hamilton Tiger-Cats	Shawn Mayne	DE	Connecticut
19	Winnipeg Blue Bombers	Arjei Franklin	WR	Windsor
20	Saskatchewan Roughriders	Chris Cowan	OL	Saint Mary's
21	Edmonton Eskimos (via Calgary)	Dwayne Mundle	LB	West Virginia
22	Saskatchewan Roughriders (via Toronto)	Tristan Clovis	LB	McMaster
23	Winnipeg Blue Bombers (via BC)	Dominic Picard	OL	Laval
24	Montreal Alouettes	Jeff Perrett	OT	Tulsa
25	Edmonton Eskimos	Mike Williams	DE	Boise State

== Round four ==
Pick #	CFL team	Player	Position	School
26	Edmonton Eskimos (via Hamilton)	Andrew Brown	LB	Lafayette College
27	Calgary Stampeders (via Winnipeg)	Riley Clayton	OL	Manitoba
28	Hamilton Tiger-Cats (via Ottawa)	Chris Sutherland	OL	Saskatchewan
29	Saskatchewan Roughriders	Peter Hogarth	OL	McMaster
30	Calgary Stampeders	Gerald Commissiong	RB	Stanford
31	Toronto Argonauts	Obed Cétoute	WR	Central Michigan
32	Montreal Alouettes (via BC)	Ivan Birungi	WR	Acadia
33	Montreal Alouettes	Adrian Davis	DL	Marshall
34	Edmonton Eskimos	Jean Phillipe Abraham	LB	Laval

== Round five ==
Pick #	CFL team	Player	Position	School
35	Hamilton Tiger-Cats	Michael Roberts	CB	Ohio State
36	Winnipeg Blue Bombers	David Stevens	RB	Saskatchewan
37	Saskatchewan Roughriders	Jesse Alexander	LB	Wilfrid Laurier
38	Calgary Stampeders	Derek Armstrong	OL	St. Francis Xavier
39	Toronto Argonauts	Brian Ramsay	OL	New Mexico
40	BC Lions	Mike Lindstrom	SB	British Columbia
41	Montreal Alouettes	Joel Wright	DB	Wilfrid Laurier
42	Edmonton Eskimos	Nicolas Bisaillon	RB	Laval

== Round six ==
Pick #	CFL team	Player	Position	School
43	Montreal Alouettes (via Winnipeg via Hamilton)	Danny Desriveaux	WR	Richmond
44	Calgary Stampeders (via Winnipeg)	Andre Knights	DB	St. Mary's
45	Saskatchewan Roughriders	Stephen Hughes	RB	Calgary
46	Calgary Stampeders	Marc Trepanier	LB	Montreal
47	Toronto Argonauts	Clifton Dawson	RB	Harvard
48	BC Lions	Jason Ward	DL	Connecticut
49	Winnipeg Blue Bombers (via Montreal)	Dexter Ross	DE	Minot State
50	Edmonton Eskimos	Greig Longchamps	OL	Montreal
