= Reggie McNeal =

American gridiron football player (born 1983)

- McNeal signing autographs after a Toronto Argonauts game on October 18, 2008

No. 1
- Positions: Wide receiver, Quarterback

Personal information
- Born: September 20, 1983 (age 43); Lufkin, Texas, U.S.
- Listed height: 6 ft 2 in (1.88 m)
- Listed weight: 205 lb (93 kg)

Career information
- High school: Lufkin
- College: Texas A&M
- NFL draft: 2006: 6th round, 193rd overall pick

Career history
- 2006: Cincinnati Bengals
- 2007–2010: Toronto Argonauts
- 2011: Calgary Stampeders*
- 2011: Edmonton Eskimos
- * Offseason or practice squad member only

Awards and highlights
- Second-team All-Big 12 (2004)
- Stats at Pro Football Reference
- Stats at CFL.ca (archive)

Reginald Parrish McNeal (born September 20, 1983) is an American former professional football player. He played five seasons in the Canadian Football League (CFL). He played college football at Texas A&M University.

== Early life ==
McNeal attended Lufkin High School, where he was a four-sport star in football, track, basketball and baseball. He was named East Texas Player of the Year as a senior after leading the football team to a 15–1 record and a Class 5A Division II state championship. McNeal rushed for 159 yards and threw for 223 in the state title game, bringing his team back from a 21–3 deficit despite an ankle injury. For the season, he completed 134 of 307 passes for 2385 yards and 24 touchdowns, while also rushing for 856 yards and 10 touchdowns. McNeal also played defensive back in critical stages of games, once returning an interception for a touchdown to clinch a playoff victory: it was one of seven INTs he recorded as a senior. He earned All-district basketball honors as a junior, was named the SuperPrep Offensive Player of the Year, and was the SuperPrep All-America #3 quarterback prospect in the country. He played in the 2002 U.S. Army All-American Bowl.

Known as a track & field athlete, McNeal was one of the top sprinters in Texas, timed in a 10.36-second 100-meter dash, and he finished third in state in that event. He also won the district title in the 200-meter dash with a best of 21.1 seconds.

== College career ==
=== 2002 season ===
Earned National Offensive Player of the Week honors after coming off the bench to throw an A&M freshman record 4 touchdowns and lead the Aggies to a 30–26 victory over then No. 1 Oklahoma at Kyle Field. This performance earned McNeal the starting job at quarterback the following week against the University of Missouri, but he sprained his ankle and missed most of the rest of that season. For the year, McNeal completed 24-of-45 passes (53.3 percent) for 456 yards and 6 touchdowns, while rushing for 137 yards on 37 attempts.

=== 2003 season ===
Became the Aggies' starting QB, starting in 11 games and playing in all 12. Completed 113-of-221 passes for 1,782 yards with 8 touchdown and 7 interceptions on the season. Connected on a career-best 91-yard touchdown pass to Jamaar Taylor, which ranked in a tie for the fourth-longest pass play in school history. Rushed for 370 net yards and 4 touchdowns on 127 attempts, with a long run of 33 yards. Passed for a career-best 259 yards on 11-of-18 passing against Kansas and totaled 330 yards (259 passing, 71 rushing). Threw a season-best 3 touchdown passes against Baylor.

=== 2004 season ===
In his 2004 season, McNeal passed for 2,791 yards and 14 touchdowns on 200-of-344 attempts. He passed for more than 200 yards in 10 games, including a career-best 298 against the University of Wyoming. He rushed for 718 yards (breaking Bucky Richardson's A&M QB record) and eight touchdowns on 151 rushes. Had two 100-yard rushing games, including a career-best 139 on 22 carries against the University of Colorado. He set a school record for greatest offensive yards of a season with his 3,509 yards on 495 plays (7.1 per play gain).

McNeal was named semifinalist for the Davey O'Brien Award and first-team All-Big 12 quarterback by the Dallas Morning News. He was named National Offensive Player of the Week by the Walter Camp Foundation and Big 12 Offensive Player of the Week after accounting for four touchdowns and 386 yards of total offense against Oklahoma State. He was named the Chevrolet Offensive Player of the Game against Texas Tech by ABC-TV. He was also heralded as "the most complete dual-threat quarterback in the nation" by ESPN.

=== 2005 season ===
Before the 2005 season, McNeal appeared on the cover of Dave Campbell's Texas Football, a great honor within the state of Texas, alongside Vince Young of Texas. After his acclaimed junior campaign, Texas A&M entered the 2005 season with high hopes for both McNeal and the entire Aggie squad. Both failed to deliver, however, as A&M stumbled to a 5–6 record and did not qualify for a bowl game. McNeal played in 10 games, missing the season finale against Texas because he was injured in the previous game against Oklahoma. For the season, he logged a career-high 16 touchdown passes (9 interceptions), completing 141-of-265 passes (53.2%) for 1963 yards. He led NCAA Division I QBs in rushing average at 6.9 yards (96-for-664), pacing the Aggies with four 100-yard rushing games. He passed for 349 yards and five touchdowns against SMU and also rushed six times for 100 yards, earning the Big 12 Offensive Player of the Week award, the Walter Camp Player of the Week award and Cingular All-America Player of the Week award.

McNeal returned to action in January 2006 for the postseason East-West Shrine Game in San Antonio, Texas, and led West team to 35–31 win with 9-of-11 passing for 211 yards and two touchdowns (no interceptions). He also rushed four times for 32 yards. Reggie graduated from Texas A&M with a bachelors in Agricultural Leadership in 2025.

== Professional career ==
=== Pre-draft ===
Pre-draft measurables
Height	Weight	Arm length	Hand span	40-yard dash	10-yard split	20-yard split	20-yard shuttle	Three-cone drill	Vertical jump	Broad jump
6 ft 2 in (1.88 m)	198 lb (90 kg)	32 1/4 in (0.82 m)	8 7/8 in (0.23 m)	4.35 s	1.56 s	2.60 s	4.25 s	6.96 s	32.0 in (0.81 m)	10 ft 1 in (3.07 m)
All values from NFL Combine

McNeal's inconsistent play in 2005, questions about his durability and his lack of NFL-style quarterback skills put his chances of being selected in the 2006 NFL draft in jeopardy. However, after impressive NFL Combine results, where he ran a 4.35 40-yard dash,

=== Cincinnati Bengals ===
McNeal was drafted by the Cincinnati Bengals as a wide receiver in the sixth round of the 2006 NFL draft with the 193rd overall pick.

McNeal played in all four of the Bengals' preseason games, and recorded 3 catches for 46 yards and 1 touchdown, plus 2 rushes for 13 yards. He was waived September 2 and signed to the practice squad September 6. He was signed to 53-player roster on September 19, and was placed on the inactive list for Games 3–9. Made his NFL debut on November 19 in Game 10 at New Orleans and also played November 26 at Cleveland. McNeal was in uniform as designated third QB on inactive list for Games 5–7, due to an appendectomy that sidelined QB Anthony Wright. McNeal recorded his first (and only) offensive stat in the NFL against the Indianapolis Colts on Monday Night Football, December 18, when he lined up at quarterback and scrambled for eight yards on third down, giving the Bengals the first down. The Bengals released McNeal on September 1, 2007.

=== Toronto Argonauts ===
On October 2, 2007, McNeal signed with the Toronto Argonauts of the Canadian Football League and was added to their practice roster. He was released by the team on October 16, 2007, only to re-sign with the Argonauts on March 20, 2008.

Though he was originally signed to be a backup quarterback, McNeal played in his very first CFL game on August 7, 2008, at Ivor Wynne Stadium as an emergency wide receiver due to the injuries suffered by the Argonauts' receiving corps. McNeal became the first quarterback to be started at receiver by the team since Danny Barrett back in the 1980s. In his debut, McNeal finished with a game-high of 101 receiving yards on 6 receptions in a 45–21 loss to the Hamilton Tiger-Cats. McNeal would finish the 2008 season with 43 receptions for 606 yards and two touchdowns.

In 2009, McNeal finished the season with 24 receptions for 309 yards and three touchdowns. On June 8, 2010, McNeal re-signed with the Argonauts. He recorded 13 catches for 175 yards and no touchdowns during the 2010 season.

=== Calgary Stampeders ===
On May 19, 2011, McNeal was traded to the Calgary Stampeders, along with defensive lineman Adrian Davis, for wide receiver P.K. Sam and defensive lineman Miguel Robede.

=== Edmonton Eskimos ===
On July 28, 2011, McNeal was released by the Stampeders and signed with the Edmonton Eskimos. On August 12, 2011, he was released by the Eskimos. He only appeared in one game for the club. McNeal retired from pro football in 2012 due to a serious back injury.
