= Derick Armstrong =

American gridiron football player (born 1979)

No. 87, 88
- Position: Wide receiver

Personal information
- Born: April 2, 1979 (age 47); Jasper, Texas, U.S.
- Listed height: 6 ft 2 in (1.88 m)
- Listed weight: 209 lb (95 kg)

Career information
- College: Tyler Junior College; Arkansas-Monticello

Career history
- 2001–2002: Saskatchewan Roughriders
- 2003–2006: Houston Texans
- 2006–2009: Winnipeg Blue Bombers
- 2010: BC Lions
- 2010: Saskatchewan Roughriders*
- 2010: Edmonton Eskimos
- * Offseason or practice squad member only

Awards and highlights
- 2× CFL All-Star (2002, 2007); CFL East All-Star (2007); CFL West All-Star (2002)
- Stats at Pro Football Reference
- Stats at CFL.ca (archive)

Derick Armstrong (born April 2, 1979) is a former gridiron football wide receiver. He most recently played for the Edmonton Eskimos and the BC Lions of the Canadian Football League.

== Early life ==
Armstrong was born in Jasper, Texas. He attended Tyler Junior College and the University of Arkansas at Monticello.

== Professional career ==
Armstrong began his football career with the Saskatchewan Roughriders of the CFL where he played for two seasons, and in 2002 he was a CFL All-Star. After his success in the CFL, Armstrong signed with the Houston Texans of the NFL. He was signed as an undrafted free agent out of the University of Arkansas at Monticello. He played there for three seasons, playing in 35 games registering 45 catches for 605 yards and two touchdowns.

On September 19, 2006, Armstrong returned to the CFL and joined the Winnipeg Blue Bombers' receiving corps, playing in the final five games of the season. Armstrong would continue to be a force on offence as he posted back-to-back 1000 yard seasons in 2007 and 2008. However, under a new regime in 2009, Armstrong would see an end to his time as a Blue Bomber as he got into an altercation with new head coach, Mike Kelly. After being informed that he would be a designated import (one of three import players that would not start), Armstrong refused to play. As such, he was released on July 8, 2009, after dressing in only one game that season.

After sitting out the entire 2009 CFL season, Armstrong signed with the BC Lions on February 4, 2010, reuniting him with Roy Shivers, the former GM of the Saskatchewan Roughriders who originally signed him to the CFL. Despite being the team's second leading receiver after week 6, Armstrong was released on August 10, 2010, with the team opting to use the younger Darius Passmore.

Armstrong was signed midway through the 2010 season by the Edmonton Eskimos, but was released in the off-season on December 16, 2010.

== Statistics ==
Receiving		Regular season						Playoffs
Year	Team	Games	No.	Yards	Avg	Long	TD	Games	No.	Yards	Avg	Long	TD
2001	SSK	10	30	436	14.5	46	1	Team did not qualify
2002	SSK	18	70	1,104	15.8	100	5	1	7	142	20.3	47	1
2003	HOU	8	7	75	10.7	18	1	Team did not qualify
2004	HOU	14	29	415	14.3	44	1	Team did not qualify
2005	HOU	13	9	115	12.8	28	0	Team did not qualify
2006	WPG	5	25	302	12.1	34	3	1	5	77	15.4	47	0
2007	WPG	17	83	1,142	13.8	52	6	3	7	143	20.4	50	1
2008	WPG	17	81	1,010	12.5	63	5	1	2	24	12.0	13	0
2009	WPG	1	0	0	0.0	0	0	Released prior to post-season
2010	BC	6	22	316	14.4	58	0
2010	EDM	4	11	121	11.0	28	1	Team did not qualify
NFL totals		35	45	605	13.4	44	2
CFL totals		78	322	4,431	13.8	100	21	6	21	386	18.4	50	2
