= Clifton Dawson =

Canadian gridiron football player (born 1983)

No. 34, 30
- Position: Running back

Personal information
- Born: October 8, 1983 (age 43); Scarborough, Ontario, Canada
- Listed height: 5 ft 10 in (1.78 m)
- Listed weight: 212 lb (96 kg)

Career information
- High school: Toronto (ON) Birchmount Park
- College: Northwestern (2002); Harvard (2003-2006)
- CFL draft: 2006: 6th round, 47th overall pick

Career history
- Indianapolis Colts (2007)*; Cincinnati Bengals (2007); Indianapolis Colts (2007–2008); Houston Texans (2009)*
- * Offseason or practice squad member only

Awards and highlights
- 4× First-team All-Ivy League (2003–2006)

Career statistics
- Rushing attempts: 30
- Rushing yards: 64
- Rushing touchdowns: 1
- Receptions: 2
- Receiving yards: 15
- Stats at Pro Football Reference

Clifton George Dawson (born October 8, 1983) is a former gridiron football running back. He was signed by the Indianapolis Colts as an undrafted free agent in 2007. He played college football at Harvard.

Dawson was also a member of the Cincinnati Bengals and Houston Texans.

== Early life ==
Dawson was born in the Toronto suburb of Scarborough. He attended Birchmount Park Collegiate Institute in Toronto, and was a good student and a letterman in football and track. In football, as a senior, he led his team to the Toronto City Championship, was named the team's Most Valuable Player, and was an All-Canada selection.

== College career ==
Dawson briefly attended Northwestern University before opting to transfer to Harvard University.

During his freshman season at Harvard, he was unanimously selected for the first-team All-Ivy League, making him the first offensive player in Ivy League history to earn first-team honors as a freshman. Dawson set the league's single-season record for rushing yards by a freshman with 1,187 yards and became the first freshman in Ivy League history to rush for more than 1,000 yards. Dawson fumbled just once in 215 carries.

During his sophomore season, he was again named a unanimous first-team All-America selection and was named to the New England Football Writers All-New England team. He placed tenth in the balloting for the Walter Payton Award, which is given to the top player in the Division I Football Championship Subdivision. He led the Ivy League in rushing, with an average of 130.2 yards per game, making him the highest-ranking sophomore in Division I-AA and one of just three sophomores among the nation's top 25 rushers. He set Harvard's single-season records for rushing yards (1,302), rushing touchdowns (17), total touchdowns (18) and points (108). He rushed for at least 100 yards in seven of the ten games with the Harvard Crimson.

In his junior season, Dawson was again a unanimous first-team All-Ivy League selection and named to the New England Football Writers All-New England. He attained a total of 1,139 yards in the season. He rushed for at least 100 yards in seven of Harvard's ten games. He ended the season by scoring the historic game-winning touchdown in the third overtime period of Harvard's 30–24 win against Yale.

In his senior season, Dawson became the all-time Ivy League career rushing leader, with 4,841 yards. Dawson earned this title on November 11, 2006, while playing Penn with a 55-yard run down the left sideline on his second carry of that game. In attaining this title, Dawson broke the long-standing record set by Ed Marinaro of Cornell in 1971. In addition to this record, Dawson finished his Harvard career as the Ivy League record holder for rushing touchdowns (60), career touchdowns (66), career points (398), and career all-purpose yards (6,138). He broke every career rushing and scoring record that Harvard keeps and became the only offensive player in Ivy League history to be named a first-team All-Ivy selection four times. He was the ninth NCAA Division I player to rush for at least 1,000 yards in a season four times. He won the Boston Globe Gold Helmet Award, recognizing the top season-long performance by an FCS player in New England, and finished ninth in the voting for the Walter Payton Award. Dawson led the Division I FCS in scoring (13.20 points per game). He finished his career ranked 16th in NCAA FCS history in rushing and tied for fifth in career rushing touchdowns and fifth in career points.

Dawson also ran track and majored in Economics while at Harvard.

== Professional career ==
=== Toronto Argonauts ===
Though he was not selected during the 2007 NFL draft, Dawson was drafted in the sixth round of the 2006 Canadian Football League Draft by the Toronto Argonauts.

=== First stint with Colts ===
He was signed as a free agent by the Indianapolis Colts after the conclusion of the draft. He was one of the team's final cuts.

=== Cincinnati Bengals ===
Dawson subsequently signed with the Cincinnati Bengals. He made his NFL debut on September 16, 2007. He played in two games with the Bengals and then, on September 25, he was released.

=== Second stint with Colts ===
Two days later, Dawson was re-signed by the Colts. Dawson played in eleven games with the Colts during the 2007–08 season and remained with the team during the 2008 off-season and training camp. The Colts waived him near the end of the 2008 training camp, but re-signed him the next day. However, he was released again before the final preseason game.

Dawson was re-signed by the Colts on October 14, 2008. It was during this stint that he scored his first and only NFL touchdown. He was released on March 22, 2009.

=== Houston Texans ===
Dawson signed with the Texans on May 19, 2009. He was placed on season-ending injured reserve on August 3. He was released with an injury settlement on August 7.
