= P. K. Sam =

American football player (born 1983)

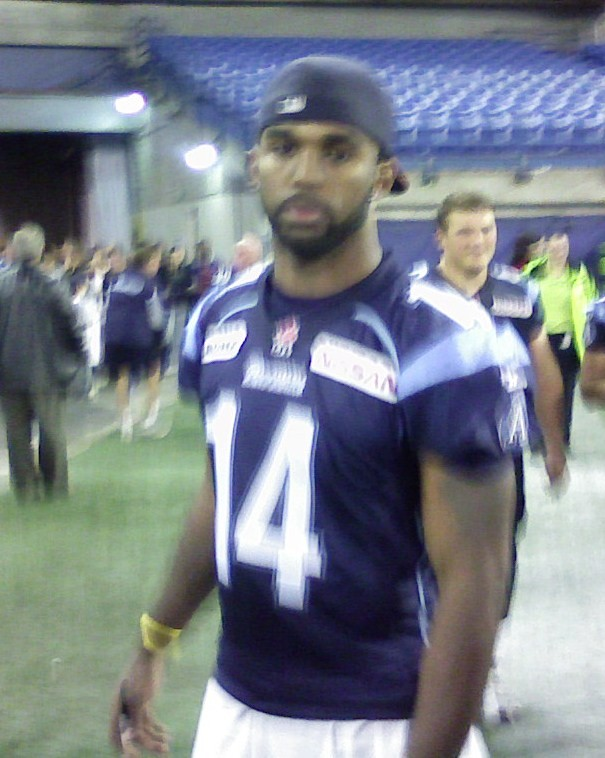
- Sam with the Toronto Argonauts in 2008

No. 14
- Position: Wide receiver

Personal information
- Born: February 26, 1983 (age 43); Denver, Colorado, U.S.
- Listed height: 6 ft 3 in (1.91 m)
- Listed weight: 210 lb (95 kg)

Career information
- High school: Buford (Buford, Georgia)
- College: Florida State
- NFL draft: 2004: 5th round, 164th overall pick

Career history
- 2004–2005: New England Patriots
- 2006: Cincinnati Bengals*
- 2006–2007: Miami Dolphins
- 2007: Rhein Fire
- 2007: Oakland Raiders*
- 2008: Toronto Argonauts
- 2009: Buffalo Bills*
- 2009: Toronto Argonauts
- 2010: Calgary Stampeders
- 2011: Toronto Argonauts*
- * Offseason or practice squad member only

Awards and highlights
- Super Bowl champion (XXXIX)
- Stats at Pro Football Reference
- Stats at CFL.ca

Philip Kenwood Sam II (born February 26, 1983) is an American former professional football player who was a wide receiver in the National Football League (NFL) and Canadian Football League (CFL). He was selected by the New England Patriots in the fifth round of the 2004 NFL draft. He played college football for the Florida State Seminoles.

Sam earned a Super Bowl ring with the Patriots in Super Bowl XXXIX over the Philadelphia Eagles. He was also a member of the Cincinnati Bengals, Miami Dolphins, Oakland Raiders, Toronto Argonauts, Buffalo Bills, and Calgary Stampeders.

== Early life ==
Sam first attended Norcross High School before transferring to Buford High School in Buford, Georgia. As a senior at Buford, Sam caught 39 passes for 1,067 yards and seven touchdowns while also rushing for two scores. As the team's free safety on defense, Sam accumulated 91 tackles and grabbed five interceptions. On special teams, Sam served as the team's punter and also returned two kicks for touchdowns, bringing his total for the season to 13. He earned all-state honors, was named conference and county player of the year, and was a Super Southern selection by the Atlanta Journal-Constitution. While playing with the Florida State Seminoles, Sam gained fame for catching a pass from teammate Chris Rix. This play led to Sam being noticed and leaving college early to pursue a career in the NFL.

== Professional career ==
=== New England Patriots ===
Sam was selected with the 164th overall pick in the fifth round of the 2004 NFL draft out of Florida State University by the New England Patriots. In his rookie season, Sam was inactive for six contests before being placed on Injured Reserve with a groin injury. In January 2005, Sam was moved to the reserve/suspended list for violation of team rules. However, Sam did receive a Super Bowl ring after the Patriots beat the Philadelphia Eagles 24–21 in Super Bowl XXXIX.

In 2005, Sam battled an undisclosed injury during training camp and the preseason, which hurt his chances of making the Patriots' 53-man roster. He was waived on September 3 and worked out for the Houston Texans prior to being added to the Patriots' practice squad, where he would spend the rest of the season.

=== Cincinnati Bengals ===
As a free agent following the season, Sam was signed by Cincinnati Bengals in February 2006. He caught two passes for 23 yards—his only receptions of the preseason—in the team's final exhibition game against the Indianapolis Colts. He was subsequently waived on September 2.

=== Miami Dolphins ===
After working out for the St. Louis Rams in October 2006, Sam signed with the Miami Dolphins and was placed on the team's practice squad. During the 2006 season Sam was forced to take a hiatus for personal reasons and was released, however he was re-signed a short time later and ended the season on the practice squad. In 2016, Sam alleged that he was released for missing a practice to visit his dying father.

Despite a new head coach, Sam was re-signed to a future contract by the Dolphins in February 2007. He played for the Rhein Fire of NFL Europa in the spring. On May 15, Sam was named the NFL Europa Offensive Player of the Week after racking up 122 yards and a touchdown in a 27–24 victory over the Frankfurt Galaxy. Sam was ultimately a final training camp cut of the Dolphins.

=== Oakland Raiders ===
Early in the 2007 NFL season, Sam signed a practice roster agreement with the Oakland Raiders. He was later released by the team in October.

=== Toronto Argonauts (first stint) ===
On September 4, 2008, Sam was a free agent signing of the Toronto Argonauts of the Canadian Football League and was assigned to their practice roster. On September 20, he made his CFL debut against the Calgary Stampeders and ended the 2008 CFL season playing in six games and made 36 receptions for 499 yards and three touchdowns.

=== Buffalo Bills ===
On January 26, 2009, Sam was signed to a reserve/future contract by the Buffalo Bills. He was waived/injured by the Bills July 29, 2009, and reverted to season-ending injured reserve. The team released him with an injury settlement on July 31, making him a free agent.

=== Toronto Argonauts (second stint) ===
Sam was activated from the deferred list by the Argonauts on August 4, 2009.

=== Calgary Stampeders ===
On February 17, 2010, Sam was traded to the Calgary Stampeders in exchange for wide receiver Jeremaine Copeland.

=== Toronto Argonauts (third stint) ===
On May 19, 2011, Sam was traded back to the Argonauts, along with defensive lineman Miguel Robede, for wide receiver Reggie McNeal and defensive lineman Adrian Davis. He was released on June 20, 2011, after playing in just one preseason game.

== Personal life ==
Sam majored in political science at Florida State. He is the son of Travis Johnson. He is the older brother of Lorne Sam. His sister, Autumn, played collegiate basketball at Clemson and is a sportscaster at WSB-TV in Atlanta, GA. He works with high school athletes in Bellbrook, Ohio to train Wide Receivers that will be selected for college teams with some success.
