= Daniel Federkeil =

Canadian gridiron football player (born 1983)

No. 76, 65
- Position: Offensive tackle

Personal information
- Born: November 9, 1983 (age 42); Medicine Hat, Alberta, Canada
- Listed height: 6 ft 7 in (2.01 m)
- Listed weight: 309 lb (140 kg)

Career information
- High school: Medicine Hat (AB)
- University: Calgary
- NFL draft: 2006: undrafted
- CFL draft: 2006: 1st round, 5th overall pick

Career history
- Indianapolis Colts (2006–2009); Calgary Stampeders (2013–2018)

Awards and highlights
- Super Bowl champion (2006); Grey Cup champion (2014)

Career NFL statistics
- Games played: 28
- Games started: 3
- Stats at Pro Football Reference
- Stats at CFL.ca

Daniel Hubert Federkeil (born November 9, 1983) is a Canadian former professional football player, having played offensive tackle. He played CIS football with the Calgary Dinos, and was drafted fifth overall by the Toronto Argonauts in the 2006 CFL draft, but signed with the Indianapolis Colts of the National Football League (NFL) shortly thereafter. He would later assist the Colts in winning Super Bowl XLI over the Chicago Bears.

Federkeil retired from professional football in 2009 following a series of Calgary Stampeders of the Canadian Football League (CFL), but returned to sign with the Stampeders in 2013 after his CFL rights were traded. He announced his retirement from professional football a second time in February 2018

== University career ==
He played university football at Calgary. He played in four games as a first year student, had three tackles and was the youngest player ever to dress for the university at 17 years and two months old. He was a five-year player who was standout on defensive line who had 111 career tackles, 20 for losses, and 13 sacks and started eight games as a fifth-year student. He Was scouted by Indianapolis Colts scout Cal Murphy, who saw his potential as an offensive lineman when Federkeil was called in to play end in short yardage situations.

In his fifth year, he totaled 31 tackles, 12 for losses, 4 sacks, 2 forced fumbles, 1 fumble recovery and 4 passes defended.

He was Canada West nominee for J.P. Metras trophy as CIS Lineman-of-the-Year and was unanimous conference All-Star and second-team All-Canadian choice. He was named University of Calgary Athlete-of-the-Year in 2006. He was one of two CIS players in East-West Shrine Game. In 2005, he was team nominee for Lineman-of-the-Year and was second-team CIS All-Canadian. He started seven games as a second year student and had 14 tackles, five for losses, four sacks, two FF and one blocked FG.

== Professional career ==
=== Toronto Argonauts ===
Federkeil was selected 5th overall by the Toronto Argonauts of the Canadian Football League in the 2006 CFL draft. Despite this, he never played for the Argos.

=== Indianapolis Colts ===
Federkeil went undrafted in the 2006 NFL draft. He was signed by the Indianapolis Colts following the draft. Played in two games on special teams against Tennessee and Jacksonville. Was subsequently moved to the practice roster until being re-signed on December 2, 2006, near the end of the regular season. He played on special teams against the Kansas City Chiefs in the wild-card round of the playoffs. The Colts went on to win the Super Bowl XLI to conclude the 2006 NFL season.

He played in the first 8 games of the 2007 NFL season as a member of the special teams unit. He suffered a concussion on December 5, 2007.

In the 2008 NFL season Federkeil started the first 3 games at right guard. Played as a member of the special teams unit in last 9 games of the regular season. Started at right guard against the San Diego Chargers on January 3, 2009, in a wild-card playoff game. The Colts lost 23–17 in overtime.

During the 2009 NFL season Federkeil played in six games as a back-up offensive tackle and member of the special teams unit before being placed on injured reserve on November 22, 2009.

Federkeil retired at the end of the 2009 season, having played in 26 regular season games; starting in 3 regular season games and 1 playoff game.

=== Calgary Stampeders ===
On April 8, 2013, the Calgary Stampeders of the Canadian Football League acquired the rights to Federkeil after trading non-import linebacker Akwasi Antwi to the Toronto Argonauts who had drafted him in 2006. He would go on to play in 59 games with the Stampeders in 5 years, culminating in four playoff games and three Grey Cup games before announcing his retirement from professional football a second time in February 2018.
