= Mike Lindstrom =

Canadian football player (born 1981)

No. 87
- Position: Slotback

Personal information
- Born: April 23, 1981 (age 45); Chilliwack, British Columbia, Canada
- Listed height: 6 ft 2 in (1.88 m)
- Listed weight: 210 lb (95 kg)

Career information
- University: British Columbia
- CFL draft: 2006: 5th round, 40th overall pick

Career history
- BC Lions (2006)*; Edmonton Eskimos (2007)
- * Offseason or practice squad member only

Awards and highlights
- Grey Cup champion (2006)

Mike Lindstrom (born April 23, 1981) is a Canadian former professional football receiver who played for the BC Lions and the Edmonton Eskimos of the Canadian Football League (CFL). He was drafted by the BC Lions in the fifth round of the 2006 CFL draft and spent that season on the practice roster before being released after the 2007 training camp. He signed with the Edmonton Eskimos in August 2007. He played CIS Football for the UBC Thunderbirds and was named to the Canada West All-Star and 2nd Team All-Canadian squads in 2005. In 21 CIS games he recorded 84 receptions for 1,438 yards and 5 touchdowns.
