= Jesse Hendrix =

American gridiron football player (born 1982)

Profile
- Position: Defensive back

Personal information
- Born: August 19, 1982 (age 44); Lakewood, Washington, U.S.
- Listed height: 5 ft 9 in (1.75 m)
- Listed weight: 170 lb (77 kg)

Career information
- College: Eastern Washington
- NFL draft: 2005: undrafted

Career history
- BC Lions (2006)*; Spokane Shock (2006); Montreal Alouettes (2007–2008)
- * Offseason or practice squad member only
- Stats at CFL.ca (archive)

Jesse Hendrix (born August 19, 1982) is an American former professional football defensive back. He was signed by the BC Lions as an undrafted free agent in 2006. He played college football at Eastern Washington.

Hendrix was also a member of the Spokane Shock and Montreal Alouettes.
