= Miguel Robédé =

Canadian football player (born 1981)

Profile
- Position: Defensive tackle

Personal information
- Born: June 30, 1981 (age 45); Val d'Or, Quebec, Canada
- Listed height: 6 ft 4 in (1.93 m)
- Listed weight: 278 lb (126 kg)

Career information
- University: Miami (FL) (2001); Laval (2002–2005)
- CFL draft: 2005: 1st round, 1st overall pick

Career history
- 2006–2010: Calgary Stampeders
- 2011: Toronto Argonauts*
- * Offseason or practice squad member only

Awards and highlights
- Grey Cup champion (2008)
- Stats at CFL.ca

Miguel Robédé (born June 30, 1981) is a Canadian former professional football defensive tackle. He was drafted with the first overall pick in the 2005 CFL draft by the Calgary Stampeders. He played college football for the Hurricanes of the University of Miami in 2001 and CIS Football with Laval University.

On May 19, 2011 Robédé was traded to the Toronto Argonauts, along with wide receiver P.K. Sam, for wide receiver Reggie McNeal and defensive lineman Adrian Davis.

On June 22, 2011 Robédé was released by the Toronto Argonauts.
