= Adrian Davis (Canadian football) =

Canadian football player (born 1981)

Profile
- Position: Defensive tackle

Personal information
- Born: December 17, 1981 (age 44); Greenfield Park, Quebec, Canada
- Listed height: 6 ft 4 in (1.93 m)
- Listed weight: 288 lb (131 kg)

Career information
- High school: Vanier College
- University: Concordia
- CFL draft: 2006: 4th round, 33rd overall pick

Career history
- Montreal Alouettes (2006–2007)*; Toronto Argonauts (2007–2011); Calgary Stampeders (2011)
- * Offseason or practice squad member only

Career CFL statistics
- Tackles: 4
- Sacks: 2
- Stats at CFL.ca (archived)

Adrian Davis (born December 17, 1981) is a Canadian former professional football defensive tackle who played four seasons in the Canadian Football League (CFL). He was selected by the Montreal Alouettes in the fourth round of the 2006 CFL draft. He played CIS football for the Concordia Stingers and before that, played for the Vanier College Cheetahs.

Davis also played for the Toronto Argonauts.

On May 19, 2011, Davis was traded to the Calgary Stampeders, along with wide receiver Reggie McNeal, for wide receiver P.K. Sam and defensive lineman Miguel Robede.
