= Tristan Clovis =

Canadian football player (born 1982)

Profile
- Position: Safety

Personal information
- Born: August 25, 1982 (age 44); Toronto, Ontario, Canada
- Listed height: 6 ft 0 in (1.83 m)
- Listed weight: 197 lb (89 kg)

Career information
- College: McMaster University
- CFL draft: 2006: 3rd round, 22nd overall pick

Career history
- 2006–2008: Saskatchewan Roughriders

Awards and highlights
- Grey Cup champion (2007)
- Stats at CFL.ca (archive)

Tristan Clovis (born August 25, 1982) is a Canadian former professional football safety. He played CIS Football at McMaster before being drafted by the Canadian Football League, playing for the Saskatchewan Roughriders for three seasons including their Grey Cup-winning 2007 season.

He is the younger brother of Sebastian Clovis, a former BC Lions player and television personality.
