= Jason Pottinger =

Canadian football player (born 1983)

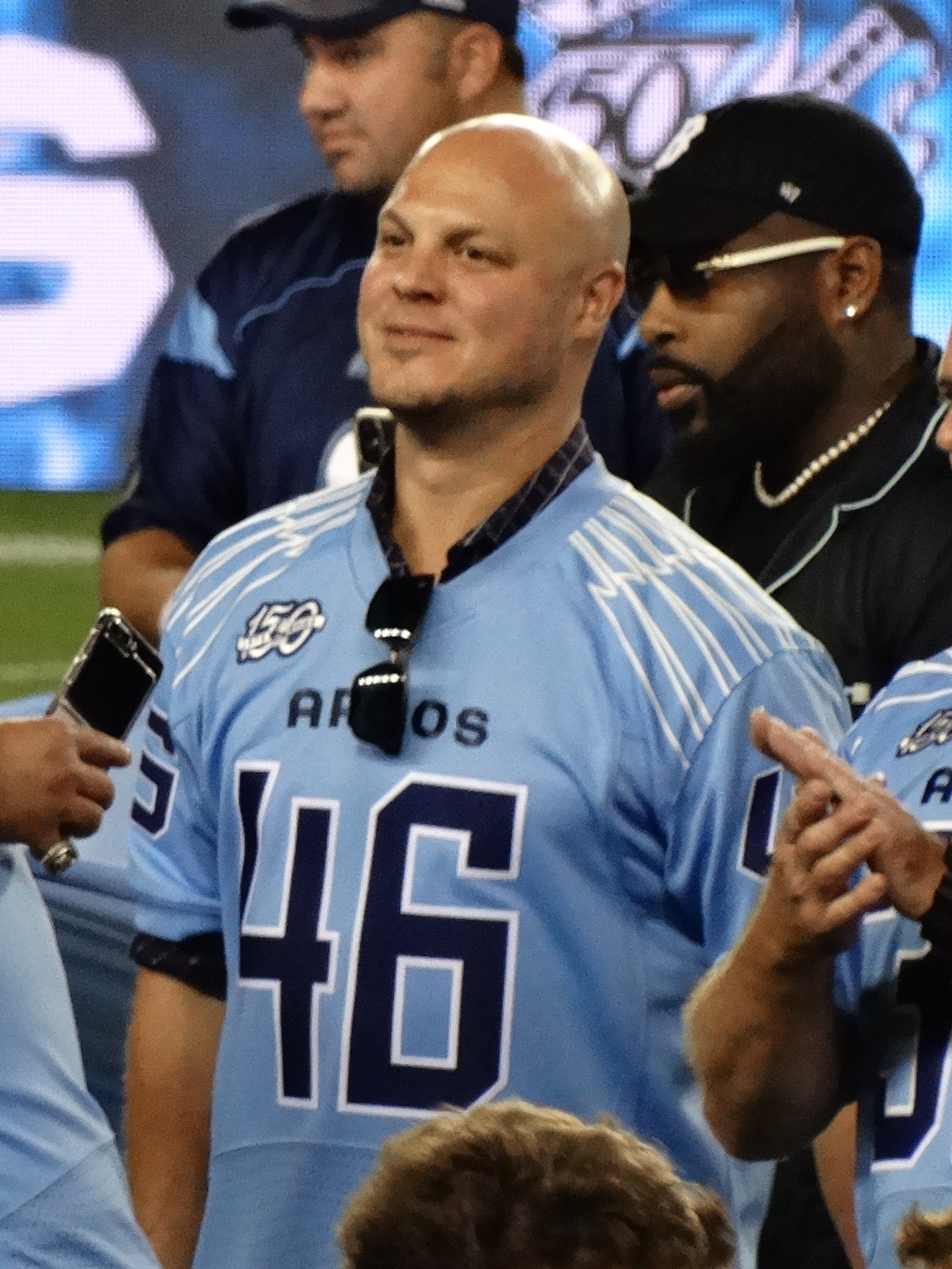
- Pottinger in 2023

Profile
- Position: Linebacker

Personal information
- Born: 29 June 1983 (age 43); Whitby, Ontario, Canada
- Listed height: 6 ft 2 in (1.88 m)
- Listed weight: 238 lb (108 kg)

Career information
- University: McMaster Marauders
- CFL draft: 2006: 1st round, 2nd overall pick
- Expansion draft: 2013: 3rd round

Career history
- 2006–2008: BC Lions
- 2009–2013: Toronto Argonauts
- 2014: Ottawa Redblacks

Awards and highlights
- 2002 Team Ontario, Canada Cup, MVP Defence; Canadian Interuniversity Sport (CIS) First Team All-Canadian (2004, 2005); Ontario University Athletics (OUA) President’s Trophy - Defensive MVP (2004, 2005); 2× Grey Cup champion (2006, 2012)
- Stats at CFL.ca (archive)

Jason Pottinger (born June 29, 1983) is a Canadian former professional football linebacker who played in the Canadian Football League (CFL). He was drafted second overall by the BC Lions in the 2006 CFL draft. He played CIS football for the McMaster Marauders.

== Early life ==
In Grade 11, Pottinger began to receive recruitment letters from several American Division I and II schools, as well as Canadian universities from coast to coast. Jason opted to attend McMaster University in Hamilton, Ontario and played CIS football for the McMaster Marauders as a starting Linebacker from 2002 to 2005. In both 2004 and 2005, Jason was named a Canadian Interuniversity Sport (CIS) First Team All-Canadian – an honour given to the best Canadian football players in the CIS – and awarded the President’s Trophy as the defensive MVP of the Ontario University Athletics (OUA) league. He was named an Ontario University Athletics All-Star three times.

Jason played his early years of football with the Oshawa Hawkeyes city football club, receiving numerous team MVP awards. In 2002, he was selected to represent Ontario in the prestigious Canada Cup tournament, held that year in the nation’s capital. Team Ontario defeated Team Manitoba in the championship game and Jason was awarded Most Valuable Defensive Player of the tournament. Jason played football with the Oshawa Hawkeyes from age 9 until he began playing for McMaster University. Jason continues to stay in touch with Durham Region youth football programs, and is a big supporter of youth football everywhere.

== Professional career ==
Pottinger was drafted in the first round, second overall in the 2006 CFL draft by the BC Lions. In his first season, the 2006 BC Lions season, he recorded 6 tackles and 19 special teams tackles in all 18 games for the Lions and was part of the Lions 94th Grey Cup victory. In his three seasons with the Lions, Pottinger recorded 115 combined tackles and one sack over 54 games.

On March 23, 2009, it was announced that Pottinger was traded to the Toronto Argonauts in exchange for a first round pick in the upcoming 2009 CFL draft. He won the starting middle linebacker job in training camp of 2010. In the opening game of the 2011 season, Pottinger tore his ACL. Despite injury, he returned to the lineup for the final 8 games of the season before having surgery at the end of the year.

The Toronto Argonauts re-signed Pottinger to a new 2-year deal on February 15, 2012, that would see him through the 2013 season. He won his second Grey Cup championship with the Argonauts after their 100th Grey Cup victory in November 2012.

On December 16, 2013, Pottinger was drafted by the Ottawa Redblacks in the 2013 CFL Expansion Draft. He played all 18 games for the REDBLACKS in 2014, providing veteran leadership in Ottawa’s inaugural season. He announced his retirement on May 29, 2015.

During his CFL career Pottinger dedicated much of his time to his charitable initiative, Tackles 4 Toilets (T4T), which raises money to build new latrines for rural grade schools in Kenya and has sent over 200 underprivileged Toronto youth to Argonauts games.

Pottinger joined the Board of the Toronto Argonauts Alumni Association in 2023. He was voted President in 2024.

== Personal life ==
In 2014, Pottinger completed his M.B.A. at the Schulich School of Business. Pottinger resides in the GTA with his wife Elizabeth and two daughters Quinn and Reese.
