= Jesse Alexander (Canadian football) =

Canadian gridiron football player and coach (born 1981)

Profile
- Position: Linebacker

Personal information
- Born: May 8, 1981 (age 45); Kitchener, Ontario, Canada
- Listed height: 6 ft 1 in (1.85 m)
- Listed weight: 226 lb (103 kg)

Career information
- University: Wilfrid Laurier
- CFL draft: 2006: 5th round, 37th overall pick

Career history

Playing
- 2006–2007: Saskatchewan Roughriders*
- 2007: Toronto Argonauts
- 2008: Winnipeg Blue Bombers*
- * Offseason or practice squad member only

Coaching
- 2007–2016: Wilfrid Laurier (LB)
- 2017–2018: York (STC)
- 2018-present: Windsor Lancers (DC)

Jesse Alexander (born May 8, 1981) is a Canadian former professional football linebacker who played for the Toronto Argonauts of the Canadian Football League. He played college football for the Wilfrid Laurier Golden Hawks. In 2004, he was named a second-year CIS all-star. The following year, Alexander helped the Golden Hawks win their second Vanier Cup.

In 2006, Alexander became eligible for the CFL draft. Both the Edmonton Eskimos and Toronto Argonauts expressed interest in signing Alexander. He was selected in the fifth round of the 2006 CFL draft by the Saskatchewan Roughriders, but the Roughriders released him in their final cuts before the regular season. Despite an offer to join the Roughriders' practice squad, Alexander chose to return to Wilfrid Laurier and play out his final year of college eligibility. He was nominated for the Presidents' Trophy, which is awarded to the best defensive player in Canada, and was also named an all-Canadian defensive player.

Alexander was re-signed by the Roughriders in 2007, but again failed to earn a spot on the final roster. After being released by the Roughriders, Alexander signed with the Hamilton Tiger-Cats and played his only two professional games in place of the injured Raymond Fontaine before being released. In April 2008, he was picked up by the Winnipeg Blue Bombers for training camp, but was released in mid-June.

In 2007, Alexander returned to Wilfrid Laurier University as a linebacker coach for the Golden Hawks. He briefly left his coaching role to join the Blue Bombers, but returned to his position after being cut. May 2016, Alexander coached linebackers with the Golden Hawks. As of March 2017, Alexander became the special teams coordinator at York University.
