= Medicine Hat High School =

Location
- 200 7th Street SW; Medicine Hat, Alberta, T1A 4K1; Canada
- Coordinates: 50.03293°N 110.69143°W

Information
- Other name: Hat High
- School type: Senior High School
- Motto: En Avant
- School board: Medicine Hat School District No. 76
- Superintendent: Tracy Hensel
- Principal: Dean Brown
- Grades: 10, 11, 12
- Enrollment: 1227 (2022-2023)
- Language: English, Spanish and Japanese
- Colours: Green and White
- Team name: Hawks
- Website: mhhs.mhpsd.ca

Medicine Hat High School is a public secondary school of 1227 students as of the 2022–23 school year. It is located in Medicine Hat, Alberta, Canada. It is a member of School District 76 (SD76), Medicine Hat's main public district and has the largest capacity of all schools within Medicine Hat

MHHS was originally built in 1952. The majority of its current main construction took place in 1962. It was again modernized from 2015 to 2017 at a cost of approximately $37.2M. The modernization process was completed in 2017.

== History ==
=== Planning ===
In January 1952, The Home School Forum was given financial details and a proposed layout of a new high school by Morris Kerr. The first unit dubbed the technical school had a proposed budget of $375,000 which would contain teaching facilities for electrical, agriculture, biology, automotive, metal work, wood work. The Technical school would contain the broiler room, and storage space and staff rooms.

The Second Unit would contain 23 classrooms, library, health unit, students union room, visual aid room, group meeting rooms, staff rooms, general office, vice principal and principal office, check room, storage, and the lobby.

The recreation wing would be built after the main construction of the school. It would contain a foyer, gymnasium, and dressing rooms. The gym would also have the option to be divided into two smaller gyms. The original capacity for the gym would have 460 people in the bleachers, 75 in the balcony. The gym had a total capacity of 1500 for stage productions. The recreation wing would also house the cafeteria along with a stage, to hold band and dramatic practices.

On May 12, 1952, it was announced that citizens would be able to participate in a referendum to vote on the schools new location on June 25, 1952. The addition of the new school was supported by the member of parliament for Medicine Hat W. D. Wylie quoted,

"It does seem to me that with the growing population we have in Medicine Hat and I am sure we are all. happy to see our city grow. It is necessary, to make a start on the building of a new high school. The present high school is totally inadequate to handle all of the students. It should also be remembered that education is a step towards better citizenship and means better opportunities for the students when they graduate. For that reason I would vote "yes" in the coming plebiscite."

In July 1952, the Public Utility Board approves the construction of the new high school.

On October 5, 2017, MHHS hosted a homecoming event for former athletes and families to celebrate the modernization of the school and its history.

On September 3, 2020, Medicine Hat High School announced it will be discontinuing the use of their Indigenous-themed team names after months of consultations. On April 6, MHHS changed their team team name to the 'Hawks'.

== Programs ==
The Medicine Hat High School offers a drama program.
