= Jeff Perrett =

Canadian football player (born 1984)

No. 54
- Position: Offensive tackle

Personal information
- Born: March 23, 1984 (age 42); Lethbridge, Alberta, Canada
- Listed height: 6 ft 7 in (2.01 m)
- Listed weight: 320 lb (145 kg)

Career information
- College: Tulsa
- CFL draft: 2006: 3rd round, 24th overall pick

Career history
- 2006–2016: Montreal Alouettes
- 2017: Toronto Argonauts*
- * Offseason or practice squad member only

Awards and highlights
- 2× Grey Cup champion (2009, 2010); Leo Dandurand Trophy (2014); CFL East All-Star (2015)
- Stats at CFL.ca

Jeff Perrett (born March 23, 1984) is a Canadian former professional football offensive tackle. Aside from spending the final off-season (2017) of his career with the Toronto Argonauts, Perrett spent the rest of his CFL career (2006-2016) with the Montreal Alouettes. He was drafted by the Montreal Alouettes in the third round of the 2006 CFL draft. Perrett appeared in 166 regular-season games with Montreal and helped the team win two Grey Cups during his tenure. He played college football for the Tulsa Golden Hurricanes. Perrett was the East Division nominee for the CFL's Most Outstanding Offensive Lineman Award in 2014, winning the Leo Dandurand Trophy. On May 1, 2017, at the age of 33, Perret announced his retirement from professional football.

Perrett is a Latter-day Saint.
