= Rontarius Robinson =

American gridiron football player (born 1982)

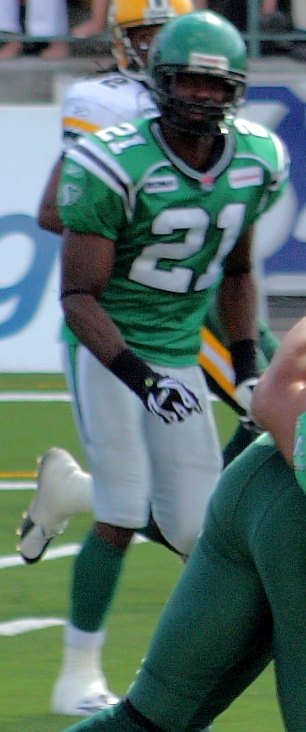
- Robinson with the Saskatchewan Roughriders in 2007

No. 21
- Position: Defensive back

Personal information
- Born: April 8, 1982 (age 44); Tallahassee, Florida, U.S.
- Listed height: 5 ft 11 in (1.80 m)
- Listed weight: 185 lb (84 kg)

Career information
- College: Howard University

Career history
- 2005–07: Saskatchewan Roughriders
- 2008: Hamilton Tiger-Cats

Awards and highlights
- Grey Cup champion (2007)
- Stats at CFL.ca

Rontarius Robinson (born April 8, 1982) is an American former professional football defensive halfback who played in the Canadian Football League.

== Career ==
Robinson was signed as a free agent by the Saskatchewan Roughriders in 2005, and dressed for three games that year. In 2006, he dressed for a total of eighteen games, starting six at defensive back and linebacker. He finished the year with a total of 28 tackles, three interceptions, and a fumble recovery.

On May 23, 2008, he was signed as a free agent with the Hamilton Tiger-Cats. He was released on May 8, 2009.

He attended college at Howard University.
