= O'Neil Wilson =

Canadian football player (born 1978)

Profile
- Position: Wide receiver

Personal information
- Born: January 17, 1978 (age 48); Scarborough, Ontario, Canada
- Listed height: 6 ft 2 in (1.88 m)
- Listed weight: 189 lb (86 kg)

Career information
- High school: Central Tech (Toronto)
- College: Connecticut
- CFL draft: 2004: 3rd round, 25th overall pick

Career history
- 2004–2006: Montreal Alouettes
- 2007: Winnipeg Blue Bombers
- 2008: Hamilton Tiger-Cats
- 2008–2010: BC Lions
- 2011: Toronto Argonauts*
- * Offseason or practice squad member only
- Stats at CFL.ca

O'Neil Wilson (born January 17, 1978) is a Canadian former professional football wide receiver who played in the Canadian Football League (CFL). He was selected in the 3rd round of the 2004 CFL draft by the Montreal Alouettes. He played college football at UConn.

Wilson also played for the Winnipeg Blue Bombers, Hamilton Tiger-Cats, and BC Lions. He had a brief stint on the Toronto Argonauts' practice roster in 2011. He attended Central Technical School in Toronto.
