= Étienne Boulay =

Canadian gridiron football player (born 1983)

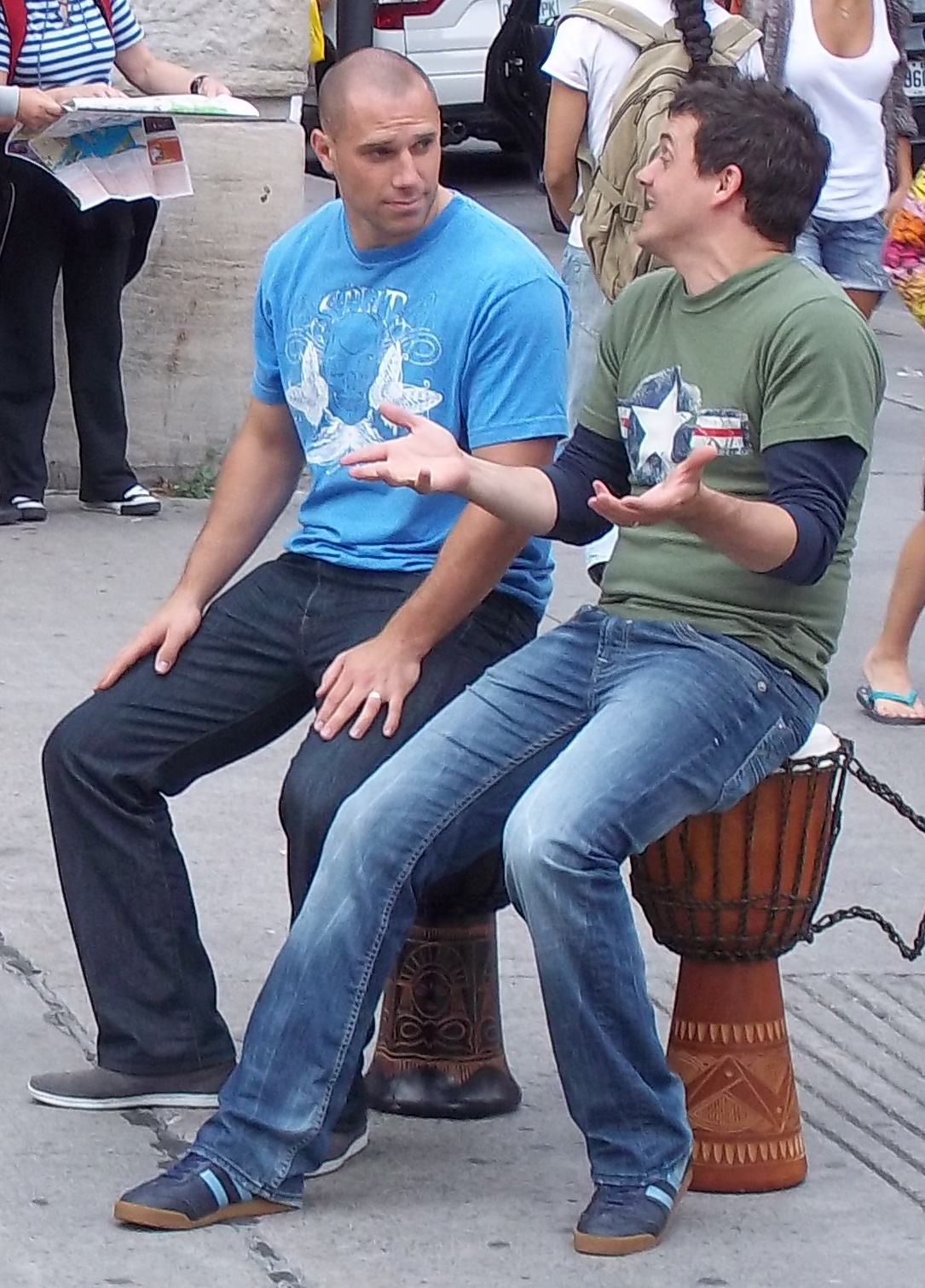
- Boulay, left, in 2011

No. 27
- Position: Safety

Personal information
- Born: March 10, 1983 (age 43); Montreal, Quebec, Canada
- Listed height: 5 ft 9 in (1.75 m)
- Listed weight: 187 lb (85 kg)

Career information
- High school: Kent School (Kent, Connecticut)
- College: New Hampshire
- CFL draft: 2006: 2nd round, 16th overall pick

Career history
- 2006–2007: Montreal Alouettes
- 2008: New York Jets*
- 2008–2011: Montreal Alouettes
- 2012: Toronto Argonauts
- * Offseason or practice squad member only

Awards and highlights
- 3× Grey Cup champion (2009, 2010, 2012); Frank M. Gibson Trophy (2006)
- Stats at CFL.ca (archive)

Étienne Boulay (born March 10, 1983) is a Canadian former professional football safety. He most recently played for the Toronto Argonauts of the Canadian Football League, with whom he won the 100th Grey Cup championship. He previously played for the Montreal Alouettes from 2006 to 2011 where he won two more Grey Cup championships. He was drafted 16th overall by the Alouettes in the 2006 CFL draft. He played college football for the New Hampshire Wildcats.

Boulay signed with the New York Jets of the National Football League in 2008 but was released in preseason.

== Early life ==
Boulay played at Kent School in Kent, Connecticut. In 2001, he led Kent to the New England Class A Championship in football as a running back, defensive back, and team captain. Following the season, Étienne was voted the New England Class A Player of the Year for 2001. In high school, he attended College Jean-Eudes in Montreal, Quebec, playing defensive back for the football team.

== College career ==
He played for the New Hampshire Wildcats from 2002 to 2005. He played 13 games in 2004, making 65 tackles and intercepting three passes. He also registered 66 tackles and five interceptions in 2005.

== Professional career ==
=== Montreal Alouettes ===
He was drafted in the second round (16th pick) in the 2006 CFL draft by the Montreal Alouettes. That season, he finished fifth in the CFL with 20 special teams tackles and won the East Division Most Outstanding Rookie, 2006 and the Alouettes Most Outstanding Rookie, 2006 awards.

=== New York Jets ===
On January 18, 2008, he signed a contract with the New York Jets. He was waived on July 24 following the signing of first-round draft pick Vernon Gholston.

=== Return to Montreal ===
Boulay returned to Montreal in August 2008. On June 15, 2012, Boulay was released by the Alouettes.

=== Toronto Argonauts ===
On July 15, 2012, Boulay signed a one-year contract with the Toronto Argonauts, later winning the 100th Grey Cup. He was released on December 19, 2012.
