= Cedric Gagné-Marcoux =

Canadian football player (born 1982)

No. 61
- Position: Guard

Personal information
- Born: September 27, 1982 (age 44); Baie-Comeau, Quebec, Canada
- Listed height: 6 ft 2 in (1.88 m)
- Listed weight: 290 lb (132 kg)

Career information
- High school: Sherbrooke (QC) Champlain
- College: UCF
- CFL draft: 2006: 1st round, 8th overall pick

Career history
- Hamilton Tiger-Cats (2006–2009); Toronto Argonauts (2010–2012)

Awards and highlights
- Grey Cup champion (2012); CFLPA All-Star (2010); First-team All-C-USA (2005)

Career CFL statistics
- Games played: 66
- Stats at CFL.ca

Cedric Gagné-Marcoux (born September 27, 1982) is a Canadian former professional football guard. He was drafted by the Hamilton Tiger-Cats in the first round of the 2006 CFL draft. He played college football at UCF. He also played for the Toronto Argonauts.
