= Éric Deslauriers =

Canadian gridiron football player and administrator (born 1981)

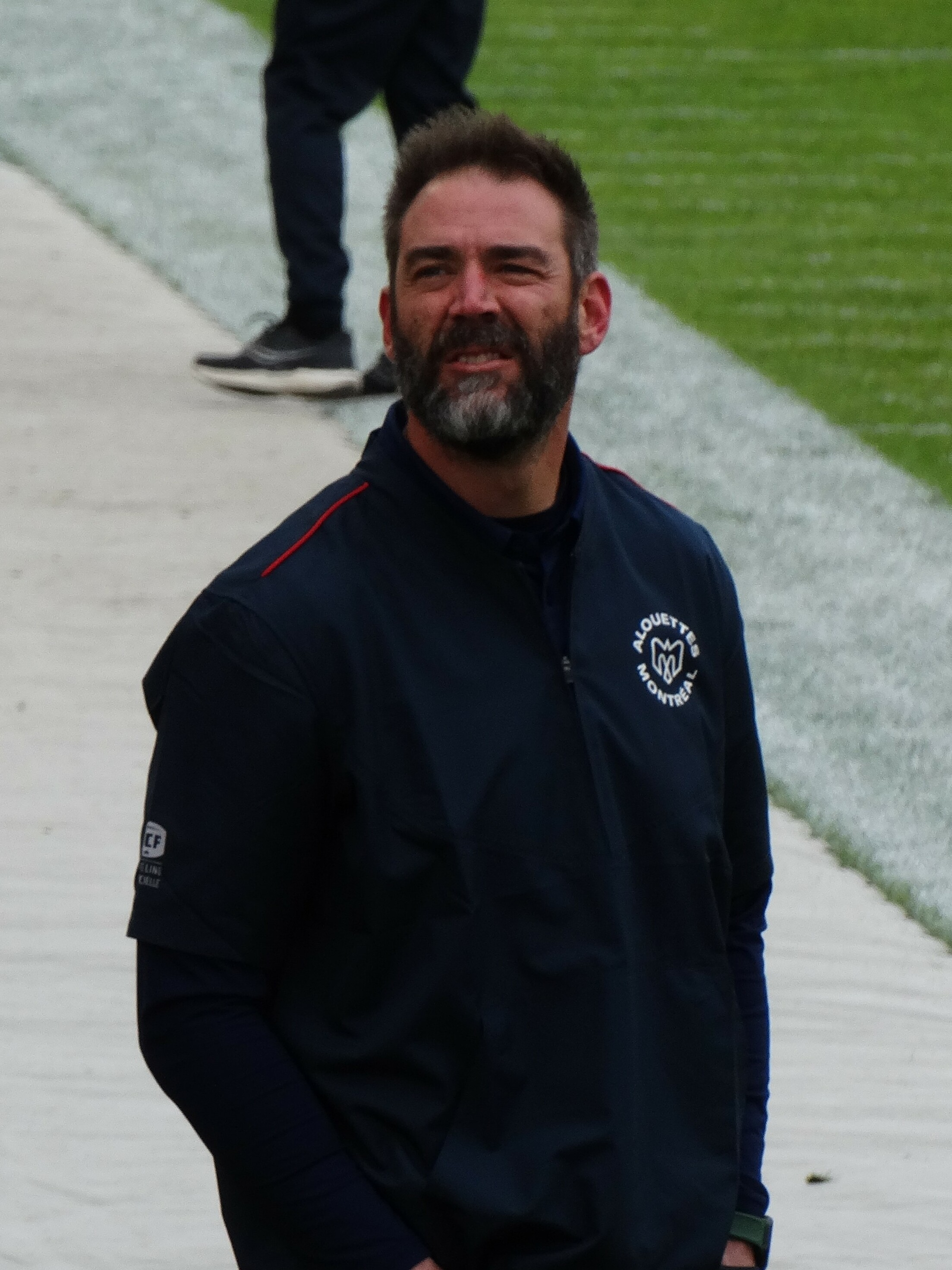
- Deslauriers with the Montreal Alouettes in 2022

Winnipeg Blue Bombers
- Title: Senior Director of Player Personnel
- CFL status: National

Personal information
- Born: March 21, 1981 (age 45); Gatineau, Quebec, Canada
- Listed height: 6 ft 4 in (1.93 m)
- Listed weight: 206 lb (93 kg)

Career information
- College: Eastern Michigan
- CFL draft: 2006: 1st round, 7th overall pick

Career history

Playing
- 2007–2015: Montreal Alouettes

Operations
- 2016–2018: Montreal Alouettes (Football Operations Assistant and Scout)
- 2019: Montreal Alouettes (Player Personnel Coordinator)
- 2019–2024–present: Montreal Alouettes (Director of Football Operations)
- 2025–present: Winnipeg Blue Bombers (Senior Director of Player Personnel)

Awards and highlights
- 3× Grey Cup champion (2009, 2010, 2023)
- Stats at CFL.ca (archive)

Éric Deslauriers (born March 21, 1981) is the Senior Director of Player Personnel for the Winnipeg Blue Bombers of the Canadian Football League (CFL). As a player, he played professionally as a Canadian football slotback who played his entire nine-year career with the Alouettes where he was part of two Grey Cup champion teams. He played college football at Eastern Michigan University.

== Early life ==
Deslauriers was born in Gatineau, Quebec, and attended Champlain College in Sherbrooke in the 2000–01 season. He became the starting quarterback for the Cougar team upon his arrival. In 10 games that season as the Cougars QB, he had 56 rushing attempts for 232 yards and three rushing touchdowns as well as completing 77 of 177 passes for 1347 yards and 10 passing Touchdowns. He was named a first team all-star as QB that season.

== College career ==
In 2002, Deslauriers received a full football scholarship from the NCAA's Division 1 Mid-American Conference's Eastern Michigan University. After playing the quarterback position all of his life, the Eagles' coaching staff decided to tap into Deslauriers' natural athletic abilities, (6'4 215 lbs), and switched him to the wide receiver position because of a surplus of quarterbacks on the team.

After sitting out the 2002 season as a redshirt, Deslauriers finally arrived as a force to be reckoned with in the 2004 season. Deslauriers had 84 receptions that year for 1,257 yards and an EMU-record 13 touchdown receptions, all while being named the team MVP that year.

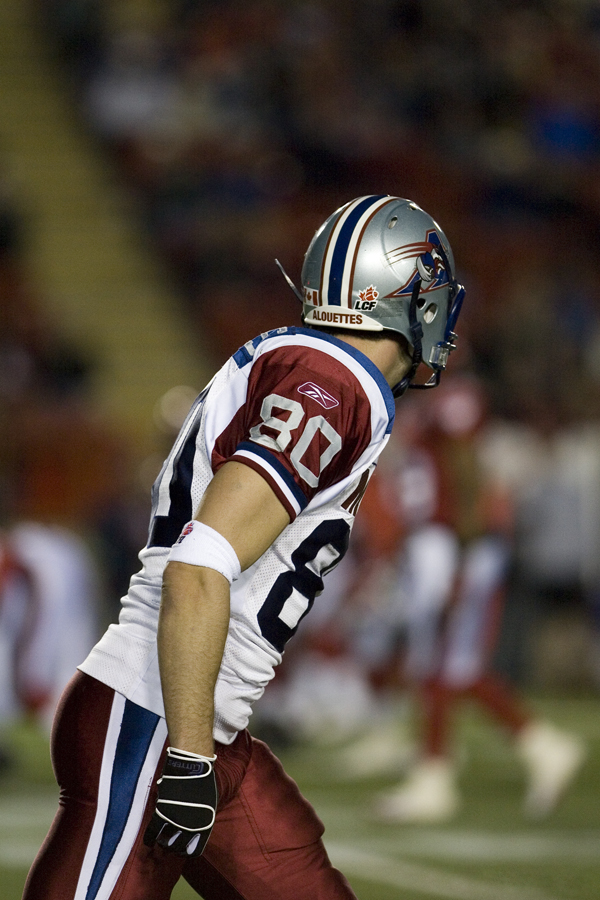
Deslauriers playing in 2007

Deslauriers completed his Communications major at EMU. He finished his football career at EMU as the Eagles' career leader in touchdown receptions, with 27, total receiving yards, 3,250, and most receptions with 248. He shares the EMU record for touchdowns in a game with 4. Tied an EMU record for points in a game with 26 on November 6, 2004. He also had 6 games with his receptions numbers in double figures, he had 2, 14-reception games, had 14 games with 100 plus yards receiving and recorded a career best 209 yards at Ball State on October 9, 2004. Deslauries earned 4 varsity letters, (2003, 2004, 2005, 2006), and finished 5th in Mid-American Conference history with 248 receptions and 8th in league history with 3,250 yards while also putting together an amazing 35 game streak with at least one reception.

== Professional career ==
After trying out for the Pittsburgh Steelers of the National Football League, Deslauriers signed a 4-year contract with the Montreal Alouettes of the Canadian Football League. He was Montreal's 7th overall draft pick in the 2006 CFL draft. In his first year with limited playing time in 2007, he had 23 receptions for 325 yards and one touchdown. He finished his career having played in 115 regular season games, recording 99 receptions for 1,334 yards and three touchdowns.

== Administrative career ==
Deslauriers retired as a player in February 2016 but stayed with the Alouettes as a football operations assistant and scout. He was named as the team's Player Personnel Coordinator on July 18, 2019 shortly after the dismissal of the team's general manager, Kavis Reed. He was promoted to Director of Football Operations after the 2019 Montreal Alouettes season on December 18, 2019.

On January 10, 2025, it was announced that Deslauriers had joined the Winnipeg Blue Bombers as a senior director of player personnel.
