= Matt O'Meara =

Canadian football player (born 1982)

Profile
- Position: Guard

Personal information
- Born: August 7, 1982 (age 44); Milton, Ontario
- Listed height: 6 ft 5 in (1.96 m)
- Listed weight: 285 lb (129 kg)

Career information
- College: McMaster
- CFL draft: 2005: 1st round, 3rd overall pick

Career history
- 2005–2006: Saskatchewan Roughriders
- 2007–2008: Winnipeg Blue Bombers
- 2009: Saskatchewan Roughriders
- Stats at CFL.ca

Matt O'Meara (born August 7, 1982 in Milton, Ontario) is a Canadian former professional football guard who played for the Saskatchewan Roughriders of the Canadian Football League. He was signed on for two years by the Roughriders as the third overall selection in the 2005 CFL draft, with his position as offensive lineman on the injury reserve list for the team. He played CIS Football at his alumni McMaster University, his position being offensive tackle. While at McMaster University, he became the 2003/2004 OUA First Team All-Star. He played in three Yates Cup championships before he signed on with the Roughriders in 2005.

O'Meara, released in 2006 by the Roughriders, played for the Winnipeg Blue Bombers after he was signed on during the 2007 CFL draft. He played as an offensive lineman understudy during his season with the Blue Bombers.

He re-signed with Saskatchewan on July 6, 2009 as a free agent. After 2 months, O'Meara retired from his career in the CFL, and instead pursued his MBA, an education program he began in the beginning of 2009.
