= Dominic Picard =

Canadian gridiron football player and coach (born 1973)

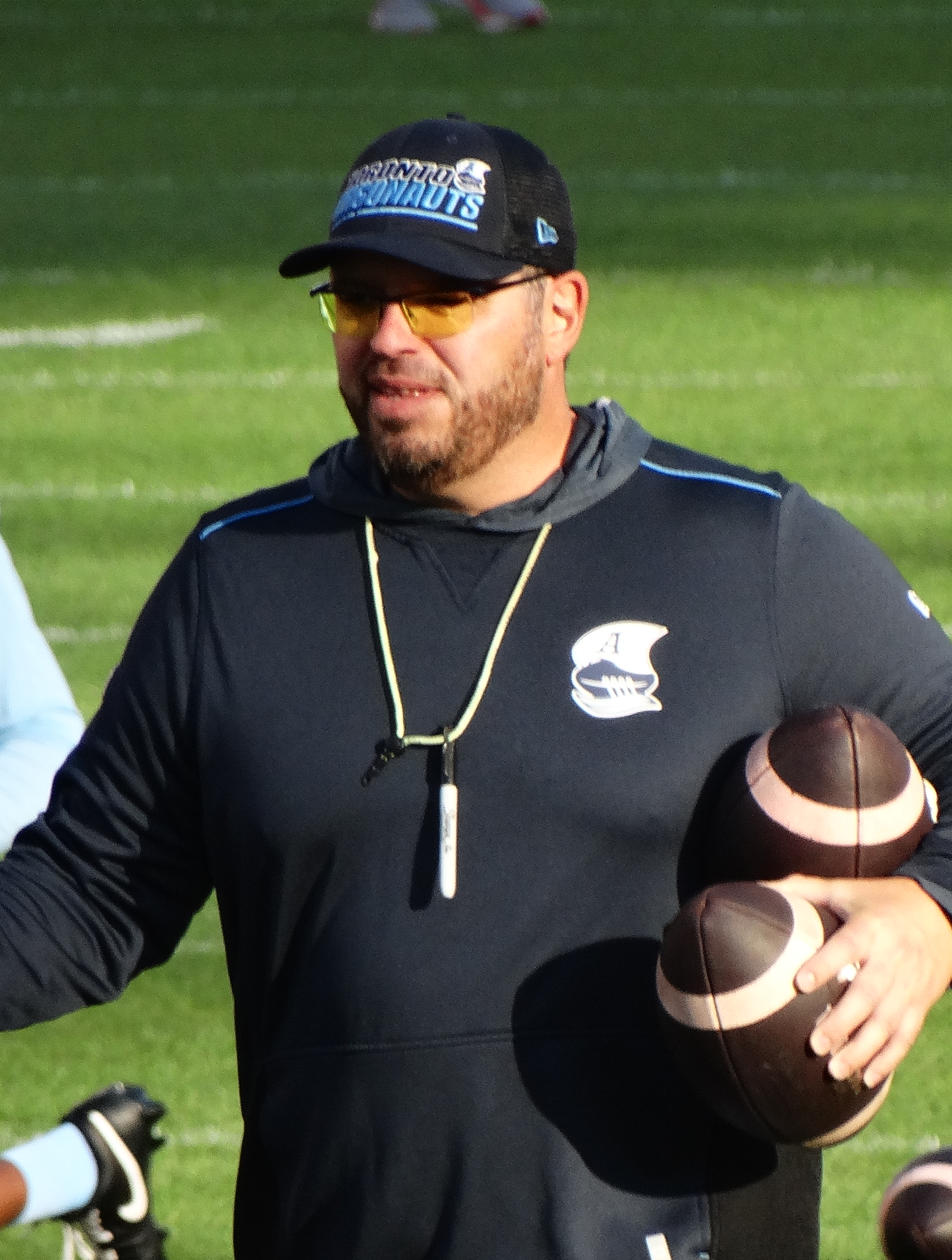
- Picard with the Toronto Argonauts in 2024

Toronto Argonauts
- Title: Offensive line coach
- CFL status: National

Personal information
- Born: June 22, 1982 (age 44); Sainte-Foy, Quebec, Canada
- Listed height: 6 ft 2 in (1.88 m)
- Listed weight: 302 lb (137 kg)

Career information
- Position: Offensive lineman (No. 64, 68)
- University: Laval
- CFL draft: 2006: 3rd round, 23rd overall pick

Career history

Playing
- Winnipeg Blue Bombers (2006–2008); Toronto Argonauts (2009–2011); Saskatchewan Roughriders (2012–2014); Winnipeg Blue Bombers (2015); Montreal Alouettes (2016)*
- * Offseason or practice squad member only

Coaching
- Séminaire St-François Blizzard (2016-2019) (Head coach) (Offensive coordinator) (Offensive line coach); St-Jean Géants (2020) (Offensive coordinator) (Offensive line coach); Garneau Élans (2020-2022) (Head coach) (Offensive coordinator); Sherbrooke Vert & Or (2023) (Offensive coordinator) (Offensive line coach); Toronto Argonauts (2024–2025) (Running backs coach); Toronto Argonauts (2026–present) (Offensive line coach)

Awards and highlights
- 2× Grey Cup champion (2013, 2024); CFL East All-Star (2011); J. P. Metras Trophy (2005)
- Stats at CFL.ca (archive)

Dominic Picard (born June 22, 1982) is a Canadian former professional football centre and is the offensive line coach for the Toronto Argonauts of the Canadian Football League (CFL). He played for four different teams over an 11-year career in the CFL. Picard played in 151 regular season CFL games and 11 post-season games and was a member of the 101st Grey Cup champion Saskatchewan Roughriders. He was also named a CFL East All-Star in 2011. He played CIS Football at Laval.

== University career ==
Picard played CIS football for the Laval Rouge et Or from 2002 to 2005, where he won two Vanier Cups (2003–04). He started 44 games in his career and was named an All-Canadian in 2004 and 2005 and rookie of the year in the Quebec Conference in 2002. He had cancer during the 2004 season, during which he missed two playoffs games, and then made a remarkable comeback in the 2005 season where he won the J. P. Metras Trophy as the top lineman in the country.

== Professional career ==
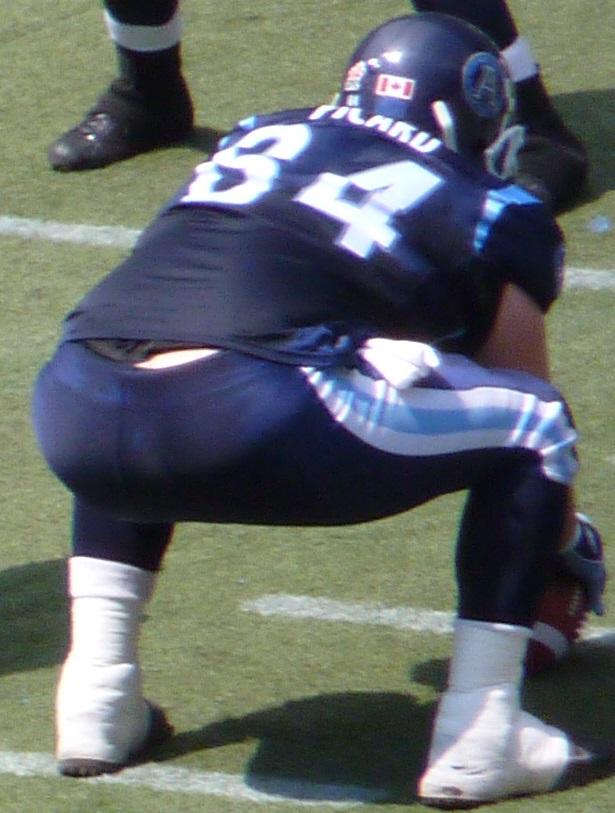
Picard with the Toronto Argonauts in 2009.

=== Winnipeg Blue Bombers (first stint) ===
Picard was drafted 23rd overall by the Winnipeg Blue Bombers in the 2006 CFL draft and played with the club for three seasons. He started the Grey Cup in 2007 where he was leading an offensive line that allowed the fewest sacks in the CFL. He was working with Bob Wylie, who had coached for more than 20 years in the National Football League.

=== Toronto Argonauts ===
Picard then joined the Toronto Argonauts in 2009 as a top free agent and spent three seasons with the club where he has never missed a game with the organization, including his selection as the top lineman of the Argos and first Eastern All-Star award in 2011.

=== Saskatchewan Roughriders ===
Picard tested free agency for a second time in his professional career and signed with the Saskatchewan Roughriders on February 16, 2012. Picard was selected as the top lineman for the Riders in 2012 and 2014 as well as top Canadian of the team in 2012. He won his first Grey Cup championship with the Roughriders in the 2013. After the end of the 2013 season, Picard signed a contract extension with the Roughriders through the 2015 season. However, the Roughriders released him on January 5, 2015.

=== Winnipeg Blue Bombers (second stint) ===
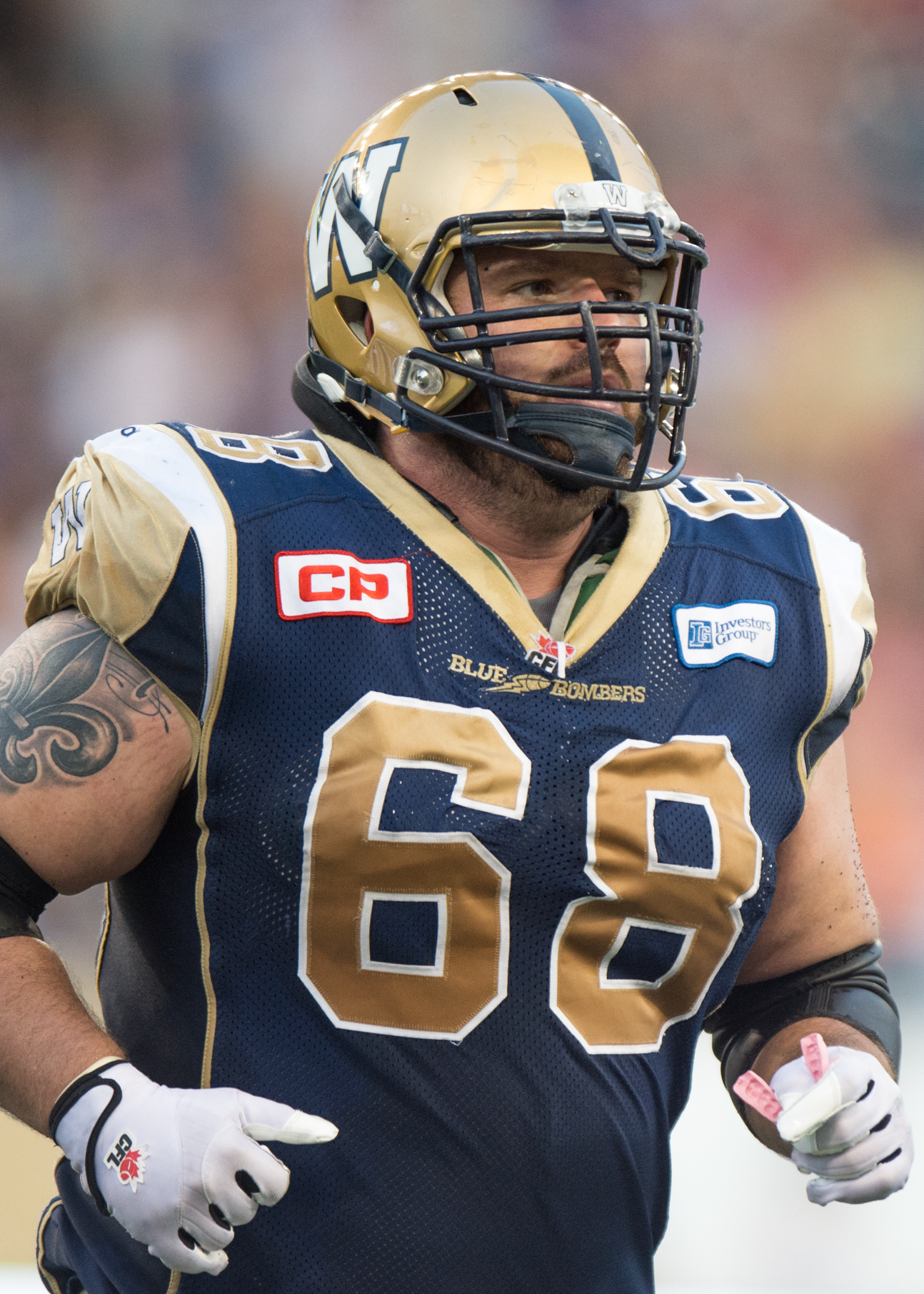
Picard with the Winnipeg Blue Bombers in 2015

On the same day that he was released by the Roughriders, and Picard signed with the Winnipeg Blue Bombers, returning to the team that drafted him. He was reunited with Bob Wylie once again, a coach that coached Picard in the early stage of his career back in Winnipeg. After one season, Picard was released by the Blue Bombers on December 30, 2015.

=== Montreal Alouettes ===
As a free agent, Picard signed with the Montreal Alouettes on January 19, 2016. However, he did not play a regular season game for the team as he announced his retirement June 3, 2016.

== Coaching career ==
=== Séminaire St-François High School ===
When Picard retired, he joined the Séminaire St-François Blizzard football program in 2016 as the offensive line coach, where he played High School football, from 1994 to 1998. He contributed to the team's success with their two championships (2016–2017) where the Blizzard had the leading rusher for two straight years. He then became the offensive coordinator in 2018 where the team played in its third championship game in a row, where they ended short by a score of 38–32 when they led the game 20–9 at half-time vs Collège Jean-Eudes. In February 2019, he became the head coach, in addition to retaining his duties as offensive coordinator, where his team finished with a 8–1 season and a 1–1 record in the playoffs.

=== CEGEP St-Jean-sur-Richelieu Géants ===
Picard joined the Géants in St-Jean-sur-Richelieu, Québec, on February 11, 2020, as the offensive coordinator and offensive line coach, which made him the second full-time coach in the program. The team has never played a game as COVID-19 restrictions cancelled all games. Picard resigned with the organization on November 15, 2020, to pursue other opportunities.

=== CEGEP Garneau Élans ===
Picard became the fifth head coach of Cégep Garneau on November 16, 2020. He took over a team that did not play in 2020 due to COVID-19 restrictions in the RSEQ. The team finished with a 4–4 record in 2021 and made it to the semi-final vs Vanier College, the eventual Bowl d'Or winner (RSEQ Championship). In 2022, Garneau was off to a poor 1–3 start before finishing strong with a berth in the semi-final for a second year in a row, but fell short to reach the championship game. On December 5, 2022, Picard resigned with Garneau.

=== Sherbrooke Vert & Or ===
On December 6, 2022, it was announced that Picard had been named the offensive coordinator and offensive line coach for the Sherbrooke Vert & Or. He spent one season with the team before resigning on November 16, 2023, after the school decided not to renew the contract of head coach Mathieu Lecompte. Picard's contribution with the program showed a huge improvement in one season. The first improvement was protecting the Quarterback, where his Offensive Line reached the best number allowing the lowest number of Sacks since 2015 with 14, where the previous year, the Oline allowed a total of 27. His contribution also helped the Offense reaching the best numbers on Total Offense since 2015.

=== Toronto Argonauts ===
On January 22, 2024, it was announced that Picard had joined the Toronto Argonauts to serve as their running backs coach. On November 17, 2024, Picard won a second Grey Cup, this time as a coach, as the Argonauts defeated the Winnipeg Blue Bombers in the 111th Grey Cup. After two years in that capacity, he was named the offensive line coach on January 8, 2026.

In Picard’s first season as offensive line coach, the Argonauts led the CFL with 6,165 regular-season passing yards and allowed 34 sacks on 652 pass attempts, tied for the third-fewest in the league. Toronto had allowed a league-high 56 sacks in 2025. The team’s rushing total rose from 929 yards in 2025 to 1,300 yards in 2026, when it averaged 4.9 yards per carry.
