= Joel Wright =

Canadian football player (born 1980)

Profile
- Position: Safety

Personal information
- Born: August 27, 1980 (age 46); Stoney Creek, Ontario
- Listed height: 5 ft 11 in (1.80 m)
- Listed weight: 190 lb (86 kg)

Career information
- University: Wilfrid Laurier
- CFL draft: 2004: 3rd round, 21st overall pick

Career history
- 2006–2007: Green Bay Packers*
- 2007–2009: Montreal Alouettes
- * Offseason or practice squad member only
- Stats at CFL.ca

Joel Wright (born August 27, 1980) is a Canadian football safety for the Montreal Alouettes of the Canadian Football League. He was drafted by the Alouettes in the third round of the 2004 CFL draft, and has spent the past two seasons on the practice roster of the Montreal Allouettes, following an unsuccessful tryout with the Green Bay Packers. He played CIS Football at Wilfrid Laurier.

== Sources ==
- Montreal Alouettes bio
- CFLapedia bio
