= Jonta Woodard =

American gridiron football player (born 1978)

Profile
- Position: Offensive tackle

Personal information
- Born: July 22, 1978 (age 48); Stockton, California, US
- Listed height: 6 ft 5 in (1.96 m)
- Listed weight: 325 lb (147 kg)

Career information
- College: Louisville
- NFL draft: 2003: undrafted

Career history
- Louisville Fire (2003); Hamilton Tiger-Cats (2004–2008); Toronto Argonauts (2008–2009)
- Stats at CFL.ca (archive)

Jonta Woodard (born July 22, 1978) is an American-born former Canadian football offensive tackle in the Canadian Football League. Woodard has played for the Hamilton Tiger-Cats and the Toronto Argonauts. He also played for the Louisville Fire of the af2 as an undrafted free agent in 2003.

Woodard played college football at Louisville.
