= Danny Desriveaux =

Canadian football player (born 1981)

Profile
- Position: Slotback

Personal information
- Born: December 20, 1981 (age 44); Laval, Quebec, Canada
- Listed height: 5 ft 9 in (1.75 m)
- Listed weight: 191 lb (87 kg)

Career information
- College: University of Richmond, Vanier College
- CFL draft: 2006: 6th round, 43rd overall pick

Career history
- 2007–2011: Montreal Alouettes
- 2012: Toronto Argonauts

Awards and highlights
- 3× Grey Cup champion (2009, 2010, 2012)
- Stats at CFL.ca

Danny Desriveaux (born December 20, 1981) is a Canadian former professional football slotback in the Canadian Football League for the Montreal Alouettes and the Toronto Argonauts. He was drafted by the Alouettes in the sixth round of the 2006 CFL draft with the 43rd overall pick. He played college football for the Richmond Spiders and at Vanier College for the Cheetahs.

Desriveaux holds two university degrees; a bachelor's degree in finance from the University of Connecticut and an MBA from the University of Richmond.
