= Adrian Baird =

Canadian football player (born 1979)

Profile
- Position: Defensive end

Personal information
- Born: July 15, 1979 (age 47); Scarborough, Ontario, Canada
- Listed height: 6 ft 5 in (1.96 m)
- Listed weight: 245 lb (111 kg)

Career information
- University: Ottawa
- CFL draft: 2005: 5th round, 37th overall pick

Career history
- 2005: Ottawa Renegades
- 2006–2007: Winnipeg Blue Bombers
- 2008: Edmonton Eskimos
- 2009: Hamilton Tiger-Cats

Career CFL statistics
- Tackles: 50
- Sacks: 0
- Forced fumbles: 0
- Stats at CFL.ca (archive)

Adrian Baird (born July 15, 1979) is a Canadian former professional football defensive end. He was drafted by the Ottawa Renegades in the fifth round of the 2005 CFL draft. He played CIS football for the Ottawa Gee-Gees.

Baird also played for the Winnipeg Blue Bombers, Edmonton Eskimos, and Hamilton Tiger-Cats.
