= Shawn Mayne =

Canadian football player (born 1980)

Shawn “House of Mayne” Mayne
Profile
- Position: Defensive end

Personal information
- Born: June 5, 1980 (age 46); Montreal, Quebec, Canada
- Listed height: 6 ft 3 in (1.91 m)
- Listed weight: 248 lb (112 kg)

Career information
- College: UConn
- CFL draft: 2006: 3rd round, 18th overall pick

Career history
- Hamilton Tiger-Cats (2006)*; Winnipeg Blue Bombers (2006–2009); Montreal Alouettes (2009–2010); Winnipeg Blue Bombers (2011)
- * Offseason or practice squad member only

Awards and highlights
- Grey Cup champion (2009)
- Stats at CFL.ca (archive)

Shawn Mayne (born June 5, 1980) is a Canadian former professional football defensive end in the Canadian Football League (CFL). He was selected by the Hamilton Tiger-Cats with the 18th overall pick in the 2006 CFL draft. He played college football at UConn.

He was acquired by the Montreal Alouettes through a trade with the Winnipeg Blue Bombers. He was released by the Alouettes and re-signed with the Blue Bombers on February 15, 2011.

He is currently the head coach for the Champlain Saint-Lambert Cavaliers football team and goes by the moniker “House of Mayne”. His coaching career has also included the CCL Dynamiques, Vanier Cheetahs and the Concordia Stingers which are part of the CIS.
