= Arjei Franklin =

Canadian football player (born 1982)

Profile
- Position: Wide receiver

Personal information
- Born: April 25, 1982 (age 44); Toronto, Ontario
- Listed height: 5 ft 9 in (1.75 m)
- Listed weight: 188 lb (85 kg)

Career information
- High school: Agincourt Collegiate
- University: Windsor
- CFL draft: 2006: 3rd round, 19th overall pick

Career history
- 2006–2009: Winnipeg Blue Bombers
- 2009–2012: Calgary Stampeders
- Stats at CFL.ca

Arjei Franklin (born April 25, 1982) is a former Canadian professional football slotback who played for the Calgary Stampeders and the Winnipeg Blue Bombers of the Canadian Football League.

Franklin is an alumnus of Agincourt Collegiate Institute in Scarborough, Ontario.

== Professional career ==
=== Winnipeg Blue Bombers ===
Franklin was drafted by the Winnipeg Blue Bombers in the 2006 CFL draft, 3rd round, 19th overall, after starring at the University of Windsor.

=== Calgary Stampeders ===
Franklin was traded to the Calgary Stampeders on September 20, 2009.

On February 7, 2013, Franklin retired from professional football.

== Awards and achievements ==
- 2004: All-Canadian at inside receiver. OUA First Team All-Star.
- 2003: OUA Second Team All-Star.
- 2002: OUA First Team All-Star.

== Career statistics ==
			Regular Season						Playoffs
Season	Team	League	GP	No.	Yards	Avg	Long	TD	GP	No.	Yards	Avg	Long	TD
2006	Winnipeg Blue Bombers	CFL	16	16	161	10.1	24	0	1	1	8	8	8	0
2007	Winnipeg Blue Bombers	CFL	10	36	452	12.6	61	0	3	9	88	9.8	29	0
2008	Winnipeg Blue Bombers	CFL	-	52	620	11.9	73	1	-	2	30	15.0	16	0
2009	Winnipeg Blue Bombers; Calgary Stampeders	CFL; CFL	- -	5; 3	53; 21	10.6; 7.0	18; 9	0; 0	- -	- 4	- 85	- 21.2	- 56	- 1
2010	Calgary Stampeders	CFL	-	42	523	12.5	39	2	-	3	60	20.0	27	1
2011	Calgary Stampeders	CFL	-	6	68	11.3	25	0	-	-	-	-	-	-
2012	Calgary Stampeders	CFL	-	6	35	5.8	12	0	-	-	-	-	-	-
Totals			-	168	1,952	11.6	73	3	-	19	271	14.3	56	2

== Post-CFL career ==
In 2018 Franklin began a career as a police constable with the Windsor Police Service in Windsor, Ontario.
