= 2008 Montreal Alouettes season =

Canadian football team season

- Head coach: Marc Trestman
- Home stadium: Molson Stadium

Results
- Record: 11–7
- Division place: 1st, East
- Playoffs: Lost Grey Cup

Uniform

The 2008 Montreal Alouettes season was the 42nd season for the team in the Canadian Football League (CFL) and their 56th overall. The Alouettes finished first place in the East Division, won the East Final and advanced to the 96th Grey Cup in Montreal, where they lost to the Calgary Stampeders 22–14.

== Offseason ==
The CFL announced on Monday, April 28, the Alouettes exceeded last year's $4.05-million cap by $108,285 and have been fined $116,570 as a result. Montreal was more than $100,000 over, therefore, it will also lose the fourth overall selection in Wednesday's Canadian college draft. Montreal will now be relegated to just one selection in the first-round, coming at No. 7.

=== CFL draft ===
In the 2008 CFL draft, 48 players were chosen from among 752 eligible players from Canadian universities across the country, as well as Canadian players playing in the NCAA. The first two rounds were broadcast on TSN.ca with host Rod Black.

Round	Pick	Player	Position	School/Club team
1	7	Shea Emry	LB	UBC
2	12	Andrew Woodruff	OL	Boise State
4	28	Terence Firr	REC	Manitoba
4	32 (via Saskatchewan)	Gurminder Thind	OL	South Carolina
5	36	Paul Woldu	DB	Saskatchewan
6	48 (via Saskatchewan)	Luc Brodeur-Jourdain	OL	Laval

=== Preseason ===
Week	Date	Opponent	Venue	Score	Result	Attendance	Record
A	June 12	vs. Toronto Argonauts	Molson Stadium	37–34	Win	20,202	1–0–0
B	June 19	at Winnipeg Blue Bombers	Canad Inns Stadium	16–19	Loss	29,553	1–1–0

== Regular season ==
- On October 4, Montreal Alouettes slotback, Ben Cahoon surpassed Ray Elgaard to become the leading Canadian receiver in CFL history, with 831 receptions, against the Hamilton Tiger Cats.

=== Season standings ===
East Division
Pos	Team	Pld	W	L	T	PF	PA	PD	Pts
1	Montreal Alouettes (C, Q)	18	11	7	0	610	443	+167	22
2	Winnipeg Blue Bombers (Q)	18	8	10	0	435	490	−55	16
3	Toronto Argonauts	18	4	14	0	397	627	−230	8
4	Hamilton Tiger-Cats	18	3	15	0	441	593	−152	6

Source: "2008 Regular Season Standings". Canadian Football League. Archived from the original on 2009-02-05.
(C) First round bye; (Q) Qualified for playoffs

=== Season schedule ===
Week	Date	Opponent	Venue	Score	Result	Attendance	Record
1	June 26	at Hamilton Tiger-Cats	Ivor Wynne Stadium	33–10	Win	20,589	1–0
2	July 4	Winnipeg Blue Bombers	Molson Stadium	38–24	Win	20,202	2–0
3	July 10	Calgary Stampeders	Molson Stadium	23–19	Loss	20,202	2–1
4	July 19	at Saskatchewan Roughriders	Mosaic Stadium	41–33	Loss	28,800	2–2
5	July 25	at BC Lions	BC Place Stadium	36–34	Loss	30,132	2–3
6	July 31	Hamilton Tiger-Cats	Molson Stadium	40–33	Win	20,202	3–3
7	Aug 8	at Winnipeg Blue Bombers	Canad Inns Stadium	39–11	Win	27,674	4–3
8	Aug 15	at Toronto Argonauts	Rogers Centre	32–14	Win	30,521	5–3
9	Bye						
10	Aug 29	BC Lions	Molson Stadium	30–25	Win	20,202	6–3
11	Sept 7	Toronto Argonauts	Molson Stadium	45–19	Win	20,202	7–3
12	Sept 12	at Calgary Stampeders	McMahon Stadium	41–30	Loss	30,960	7–4
13	Sept 21	Edmonton Eskimos	Molson Stadium	40–4	Win	20,202	8–4
14	Sept 28	Saskatchewan Roughriders	Molson Stadium	37–12	Win	20,202	9–4
15	Oct 4	at Hamilton Tiger-Cats	Ivor Wynne Stadium	44–36	Loss	20,423	9–5
16	Oct 13	Hamilton Tiger-Cats	Molson Stadium	42–11	Win	20,202	10–5
17	Oct 17	at Toronto Argonauts	Rogers Centre	43–34	Win	30,262	11–5
18	Oct 26	Winnipeg Blue Bombers	Molson Stadium	24–23	Loss	20,202	11–6
19	Oct 31	at Edmonton Eskimos	Commonwealth Stadium	37–14	Loss	29,911	11–7

# Games played with colour uniforms.
# Games played with white uniforms.
# Games played with alternate uniforms.

== Roster ==
2008 Montreal Alouettes final roster
Quarterbacks: 8 Marcus Brady; 13 Anthony Calvillo; 4 Adrian McPherson; Running backs: 7 Kerry Carter; 6 Avon Cobourne; Receivers: 85 Brian Bratton; 86 Ben Cahoon; 80 Éric Deslauriers; 82 Danny Desriveaux; 18 Jamel Richardson; 25 Larry Taylor; 81 Kerry Watkins	Offensive linemen: 59 Josh Bourke T; 68 Bryan Chiu C; 57 Scott Flory G; 61 Luke Fritz T/G; 65 Paul Lambert G; 67 Dave Mudge T; 54 Jeff Perrett T; Defensive linemen: 48 John Bowman DE; 95 DeVone Claybrooks DT; 98 Jermaine McElveen DE/DT; 72 Jeff Robertshaw DE; 9 Anwar Stewart DE; 90 Keron Williams DT; 69 Eric Wilson DT	Linebackers: 41 Shea Emry; 40 Diamond Ferri; 12 T. J. Hill; 51 Cory Huclack; 1 Reggie Hunt; 46 Walter Spencer; 14 D'Wayne Taylor; Defensive backs: 22 Étienne Boulay; 5 Kahlil Carter; 11 Chip Cox; 31 Mark Estelle; 0 Shawn Gallant; 20 Matthieu Proulx; 2 Davis Sanchez; 23 Keith Williams; 45 Paul Woldu	Special teams: 15 Damon Duval K/P; Reserve roster: 10 Brad Banks QB; 21 Mike Imoh RB; 16 Joel Wright DB; Practice roster: 34 Donovan Alexander DB; 87 Chris Dunlap WR; 19 S. J. Green WR; 91 Rodney Hardeway DE; 60 Ryan Karhut G; 39 Chris Smith DB; 44 Brandon Whitaker RB	Injured list: 30 Dahrran Diedrick RB; 24 Randee Drew DB; 17 Jesse Hendrix DB; -- Jeff Keeping C/G; 12 Chris Leak QB; 55 Skip Seagraves T; 88 Dave Stala SB; 84 Elijah Thurmon WR; 35 Mike Vilimek FB; 43 Gemara Williams DB; Suspended: James Judges DE; Italics indicate American players Roster updated 2026-04-19

== Statistics ==
=== Offence ===
==== Passing ====
Player	Att	Comp	%	Yards	TD	INT	Rating
Anthony Calvillo	682	472	69.2	5624	43	13	107.2
Marcus Brady	24	19	79.2	199	2	1	113.0
Brad Banks	1	1	100.0	8	0	0	118.8
Adrian McPherson	3	1	33.3	1	1	1	3.5
Damon Duval	1	1	100.0	(−12)	0	0	35.4

==== Rushing ====
Player	No.	Yards	Avg	TD	Fumbles
Avon Cobourne	145	950	6.6	6	3
Mike Imoh	62	398	6.4	3	0
Dahrann Diedrick	42	263	6.3	0	0
Anthony Calvillo	26	189	7.3	2	1
Adrian McPherson	25	86	3.4	5	1
Kerry Carter	12	79	6.6	1	0

==== Receiving ====
Player	No.	Yards	Avg.	Long	TD
Jamel Richardson	98	1287	13.1	81	16
Ben Cahoon	107	1226	11.5	29	7
Kerry Watkins	84	1178	14.0	36	10

== Playoffs ==
=== Eastern Final ===
Date and time: Saturday, November 15, 1:00 PM Eastern Standard Time
Venue: Olympic Stadium, Montreal, Quebec

Team	Q1	Q2	Q3	Q4	Total
Edmonton Eskimos	7	6	0	13	26
Montreal Alouettes	3	16	10	7	36

=== Grey Cup ===
Date and time: Sunday, November 23, 6:00 PM Eastern Standard Time
Venue: Olympic Stadium, Montreal, Quebec

Team	Q1	Q2	Q3	Q4	Total
Calgary Stampeders	0	10	6	6	22
Montreal Alouettes	3	10	1	0	14

== Awards and records ==
- Ben Cahoon, Nominee, Outstanding Canadian Award
- Anthony Calvillo, Led Eastern Division, Passing Yards (5,624)
- Anthony Calvillo, Led CFL, Passing Attempts (682)
- Anthony Calvillo, Led CFL, Passing Completions (472)
- Anthony Calvillo, Led Eastern Division, Passing Completion (69.8%)
- Anthony Calvillo, Led CFL, Passing Touchdowns (43)
- Anthony Calvillo, Led CFL, Passer Rating (107.2)
- CFL's Most Outstanding Player Award – Anthony Calvillo (QB), Montreal Alouettes
- Avon Cobourne, Led CFL Eastern Division, Rushing Yards, (950)
- CFL's Most Outstanding Offensive Lineman Award – Scott Flory (OG), Montreal Alouettes
- Terry Evanshen Trophy, Anthony Calvillo

=== All-Star Selections ===
- Josh Bourke, Eastern Division All-Star, Offence
- Anthony Calvillo, Eastern Division All-Star, Offence
- Bryan Chiu, Eastern Division All-Star, Offence
- Avon Cobourne, Eastern Division All-Star, Offence
- Damon Duval, CFL Eastern All-Star, Special Teams
- Mark Estelle, CFL Eastern All-Star, Defence
- Scott Flory, Eastern Division All-Star, Offence
- T.J. Hill, CFL Eastern All-Star, Defence
- Paul Lambert, Eastern Division All-Star, Offence
- Jamel Richardson, Eastern Division All-Star, Offence
- Davis Sanchez, CFL Eastern All-Star, Defence
- Kerry Watkins, Eastern Division All-Star, Offence
- Keron Williams, CFL Eastern All-Star, Defence
