= 2006 CIS football season =

- Duration: September 2, 2006 – October 28, 2006
- Hardy Cup champions: Saskatchewan Huskies
- Yates Cup champions: Ottawa Gee-Gees
- Dunsmore Cup champions: Laval Rouge et Or
- Loney Bowl champions: Acadia Axemen
- Mitchell Bowl champions: Saskatchewan Huskies
- Uteck Bowl champions: Laval Rouge et Or

Vanier Cup
- Date: November 25, 2006
- Venue: Griffiths Stadium, Saskatoon
- Champions: Laval Rouge et Or

CIS football seasons seasons
- 2005 2007

The 2006 CIS football season began on September 2, 2006, and concluded with the 42nd Vanier Cup national championship on November 25 at Griffiths Stadium in Saskatoon, Saskatchewan, with the Laval Rouge et Or winning their fourth championship. Twenty-seven universities across Canada competed in CIS football this season, the highest level of amateur play in Canadian football, under the auspices of Canadian Interuniversity Sport (CIS).

== Awards and records ==
=== Awards ===
- Hec Crighton Trophy – Daryl Stephenson, Windsor
- Presidents' Trophy – Patrick Donovan, Concordia
- Russ Jackson Award – Naim El-Far, Ottawa
- J. P. Metras Trophy – Chris Best, Waterloo
- Peter Gorman Trophy – Dalin Tollestrup, Calgary

== All-Canadian team ==
=== First Team ===
Offence
Teale Orban, QB, Regina
Chris Ciezki, RB, UBC
Daryl Stephenson, RB, Windsor
David McKoy, WR, Guelph
Brad Smith*, WR, Queen's
Chris Getzlaf, IR, Regina
Andy Baechler*, IR, Laurier
Chris Bauman, IR, Regina
Kevin Kelly, OL, Ottawa
Kyle Koch, OL, McMaster
Adam Rogers, G, Acadia
Chris Best, LT, Waterloo
Jordan Rempel, OL, Saskatchewan
* tie
Defence
Martin Gagné, DL, Montreal
Brian Guebert, DL, Saskatchewan
Nate Finlay, DL, McMaster
Michaël Jean-Louis, DL, Laval
Jesse Alexander, LB, Laurier
Patrick Donovan, LB, Concordia
Yannick Carter, LB, Laurier
Corey McNair, DB, Western
Sammy Okpro, HB, Concordia
Anthony Plante-Ajah, DB, Ottawa
Modibo Sidibe, CB, Concordia
Dylan Barker, S, Saskatchewan

Special Teams
Derek Schiavone, P, Western
Derek Schiavone, K, Western

=== Second Team ===
Offence
Joshua Sacobie, QB, Ottawa
Andre Sadeghian, RB, McMaster
Pierre-Luc Yao, RB, Laval
Matt Carter, IR, Acadia
Glenn Mackay, IR, Windsor
Greg Hetherington, SB, McGill
Alexandre Zara, OL, Montréal
Ben Walsh, OG, McGill
Keith Dauper, OT, Concordia
Hubert Buydens, OL, Saskatchewan
Scott Evans, OL, Laurier
Defence
Clayton Chiurka, DL, Saint Mary's
Simon Patrick, DL, Manitoba
Steve Faoro, LB, Acadia
Cory Huclack, LB, Manitoba
Stephen Wilson, LB, Regina
Justin Phillips, DB, Laurier
Jordy Burrows, DB, Saskatchewan
Jock Gemmell, DB, Mount Allison
Josh Maltin, DB, Laurier
Jeff Zelinski, DB, Saint Mary's
Elliott Richardson, S, Acadia

Special Teams
Braden Suchan, P, Saskatchewan
James Michener, K, Acadia

== Results ==
=== Regular season standings ===
Note: GP = Games Played, W = Wins, L = Losses, OTL = Overtime Losses, PF = Points For, PA = Points Against, Pts = Points

Canada West
Team	GP	W	L	OTL	PF	PA	Pts
**Manitoba**	8	8	0	0	363	143	16
**Saskatchewan**	8	6	2	0	282	148	12
**UBC**	8	4	4	0	287	209	8
**Regina**	8	4	4	0	278	256	8
Alberta	8	4	4	0	163	198	8
Calgary	8	2	6	0	133	221	4
Simon Fraser	8	0	8	1	100	431	1

Ontario
Team	GP	W	L	PF	PA	Pts
**Ottawa**	8	7	1	276	97	14
**Laurier**	8	6	2	253	142	12
**Windsor**	8	6	2	265	167	12
**McMaster**	8	6	2	253	156	12
**Western**	8	5	3	205	179	10
**Queen's**	8	4	4	177	147	8
Waterloo	8	3	5	117	264	6
Guelph	8	2	6	206	217	4
York	8	1	7	134	224	2
Toronto	8	0	8	125	418	0

Quebec
Team	GP	W	L	PF	PA	Pts
**Laval**	8	7	1	218	100	14
**Concordia**	8	6	2	229	131	12
**Montreal**	8	6	2	188	138	12
**McGill**	7	3	4	151	168	6
Sherbrooke	8	3	5	181	210	6
Bishop's	8	1	7	117	249	2

Atlantic
Team	GP	W	L	PF	PA	Pts
**Acadia**	8	5	3	197	155	10
**Saint Mary's**	7	3	4	189	130	6
**Mount Allison**	7	2	5	132	225	4
**StFX**	7	2	5	80	176	4

Teams in bold have earned playoff berths.

=== Top 10 ===
CIS Top 10 Rankings
	01	02	03	04	05	06	07	08	09	10
Acadia Axemen	1	8	7	6	12	12	NR	13	NR	10
Alberta Golden Bears	2	10	10	9	10	9	9	8	10	17
Bishop's Gaiters	NR	NR	NR	NR	NR	NR	NR	NR	NR	NR
Calgary Dinos	NR	NR	NR	NR	NR	NR	NR	NR	NR	NR
Concordia Stingers	11	11	11	7	6	6	5	4	4	6
Guelph Gryphons	NR	16	NR	NR	NR	NR	NR	NR	NR	NR
Laurier Golden Hawks	4	5	8	8	7	7	6	5	7	7
Laval Rouge et Or	1	1	1	1	1	1	1	1	1	2
Manitoba Bisons	9	7	6	4	4	4	2	2	2	1
McGill Redmen	NR	NR	NR	NR	NR	NR	NR	NR	NR	15
McMaster Marauders	6	6	5	3	3	3	7	11	9	16
Montreal Carabins	3	3	4	10	8	8	8	7	6	5
Mount Allison Mounties	NR	NR	NR	NR	NR	NR	NR	NR	NR	NR
Ottawa Gee-Gees	5	4	3	5	5	5	4	3	3	3
Queen's Golden Gaels	NR	13	13	NR	NR	NR	NR	NR	NR	13
Regina Rams	NR	NR	NR	NR	NR	NR	NR	NR	14	9
Saint Mary's Huskies	13	12	NR	NR	NR	NR	NR	12	13	11
Saskatchewan Huskies	2	2	2	2	2	2	3	6	5	4
Sherbrooke Vert et Or	NR	NR	NR	NR	9	11	NR	NR	NR	18
St. Francis Xavier X-Men	14	17	12	11	NR	NR	NR	NR	NR	NR
Simon Fraser Clan	NR	NR	NR	NR	NR	NR	NR	NR	NR	NR
Toronto Varsity Blues	NR	NR	NR	NR	NR	NR	NR	NR	NR	NR
UBC Thunderbirds	12	9	9	14	11	10	10	9	11	12
Waterloo Warriors	NR	NR	NR	NR	NR	NR	NR	NR	NR	NR
Western Mustangs	10	14	14	13	13	13	10	NR	12	8
Windsor Lancers	NR	15	NR	12	14	NR	NR	NR	8	14
York Lions	NR	NR	NR	NR	NR	NR	NR	NR	NR	NR

Ranks in italics are teams not ranked in the top 10 poll but received votes. NR = Not ranked, received no votes.

=== Championships ===
The Vanier Cup is played between the champions of the Mitchell Bowl and the Uteck Bowl, the national semi-final games. In 2007, according to the rotating schedule, the winners of the Canada West conference Hardy Trophy meet the Ontario conference's Yates Cup champion for the Mitchell Bowl. The winners of the Atlantic conference Loney Bowl championship travel to the Dunsmore Cup Quebec championship team for the Uteck Bowl.

=== Vanier Cup ===
==== Playoff bracket ====
Conference Quarter-finals
**Western Ontario Mustangs**	**20**
Windsor Lancers	16
**Queen's Golden Gaels**	**25**
McMaster Marauders	19

Conference Semi-finals
McGill Redmen	0
**Laval Rouge et Or**	**52**
Montreal Carabins	3
**Concordia Stingers**	**23**
St. Francis Xavier X-Men	6
**Saint Mary's Huskies**	**24**
Mount Allison Mounties	6
**Acadia Axemen**	**16**
UBC Thunderbirds	16
**Saskatchewan Huskies**	**35**
Regina Rams	29
**Manitoba Bisons**	**44**
Western Ontario Mustangs	15
**Laurier Golden Hawks**	**20**
Queen's Golden Gaels	10
**Ottawa Gee-Gees**	**23**

Conference Championships
Concordia Stingers	12
**Laval Rouge et Or**	**28**
Saint Mary's Huskies	24
**Acadia Axemen**	**32**
**Saskatchewan Huskies**	**32**
Manitoba Bisons	15
Laurier Golden Hawks	14
**Ottawa Gee-Gees**	**30**

National Semi-finals
Acadia Axemen	10
**Laval Rouge et Or**	**57**
**Saskatchewan Huskies**	**35**
Ottawa Gee-Gees	28

42nd Vanier Cup
**Laval Rouge et Or**	**13**
Saskatchewan Huskies	8
