= 2008 Hamilton Tiger-Cats season =

Season of Canadian Football League team the Hamilton Tiger-Cats

- General manager: Bob O'Billovich
- Head coach: Charlie Taaffe; Marcel Bellefeuille (Interim)
- Home stadium: Ivor Wynne Stadium

Results
- Record: 3–15
- Division place: 4th, East
- Playoffs: Did not qualify
- Team MOP: Chris Thompson
- Team MOC: Ray Mariuz
- Team MOR: Prechae Rodriguez

Uniform

The 2008 Hamilton Tiger-Cats season was the 51st season for the team in the Canadian Football League and their 59th overall. The Tiger-Cats attempted to win their ninth Grey Cup championship, but they failed to make the playoffs for the fourth consecutive season, which is the longest playoff drought in franchise history.

== Offseason ==
=== Jamacia Jackson ===
Ticats linebacker Jamacia Jackson died on April 16, 2008. Jackson was found unresponsive on Monday morning at a home in Sumter, South Carolina. He was later pronounced dead at a local area hospital. Jamacia was 26 years old. Jackson's stepmother, Cleo Jackson, advised The Associated Press that he was in good health and had lifted weights Saturday. Jackson had played 12 games with the Ticats last season after signing with the club as a free agent Jan. 11, 2007. Jackson spent his college career at the University of South Carolina and played in 43 games over four seasons, including 21 as a starting strong safety. His career stats include 159 career tackles for the Gamecocks along with two interceptions, returning one 98 yards for a touchdown. He also forced three fumbles and recovered two others. Jackson was named Most Valuable Defensive Player of the 1999 Shrine Bowl. Jackson was signed by the NFL's Tennessee Titans on April 29, 2005, and was waived by the Titans on July 27. After being cut by the Titans, he signed with the Montreal Alouettes and was assigned to their practice roster. Before coming to the CFL, he signed with the NFL's New York Giants in 2006 but was allocated to NFL Europe. He was selected in the 16th round by the Berlin Thunder. Despite attending Berlin's training camp, he was released March 5, 2006 and subsequently cut loose by the Giants two weeks later. Jackson is the second Ticats' player to die during a recent off-season. Offensive lineman Travis Claridge died on February 28, 2006, after being found unconscious in his Las Vegas home. Claridge was 27 at the time and his death was later ruled accidental. An autopsy revealed that Jackson died from an irregular heartbeat caused by an enlarged heart. Sumter County coroner Verna Moore stated on Tuesday April 16 that the autopsy revealed Jackson likely had an enlarged heart for years.

=== Transactions ===
- December 5, 2007: Bob O'Billovich was hired as the general manager for the Hamilton Tiger-Cats. The former B.C. Lions player-personnel director took over as general manager of the Ticats with an emphasis on tough, rugged play — especially on defence.
- January 30, 2008: The Hamilton Tiger-Cats re-signed defensive back Lawrence Gordon on Wednesday to a two-year contract.
- January 13, 2008: The Hamilton Tiger-Cats announced Sunday that Charlie Taaffe will remain the CFL club's head coach despite published reports last week that he was heading to the West Virginia University to become the Mountaineer's offensive co-ordinator.
- February 13, 2008: The Edmonton Eskimos acquired wide receiver Brock Ralph from the Hamilton Tiger-Cats on Wednesday in exchange for linebacker Michael Botterill and defensive back Chris Thompson.
- February 14, 2008: The Hamilton Tiger-Cats re-signed defensive back Jykine Bradley on Thursday.
- February 14, 2008: The Ticats released defensive back Richard Karikari and offensive lineman Ryan Donnelly.
- April 18, 2008: The Tiger-Cats signed centre Marwan Hage to a contract extension Friday that will keep him with the Ticats through the 2010 season.

=== CFL draft ===
In the 2008 CFL draft, 48 players were chosen from among 752 eligible players from Canadian universities across the country, as well as Canadian players playing in the NCAA. The first two rounds were broadcast on TSN.ca with host Rod Black. The Hamilton Tiger-Cats, with the league-worst 3–15 record in the 2007 CFL season had several offers for their first-overall selection but kept their pick and chose Saskatchewan Huskies safety Dylan Barker. Barker, a native of Moose Jaw, Saskatchewan is a two-time Canadian Interuniversity Sport first-team all-Canadian. He led the Huskies with 53 tackles, three interceptions, and four breakups last season. It is expected that he will be able to help the Tiger-Cats in the 2008 CFL season.

Round	Pick	Player	Position	School/Club team
1	1	Dylan Barker	DB	Saskatchewan
3	17	Michael Giffin	RB/FB	Queen's
5	33	Laurent Lavigne Masse	REC	Laval

== Roster ==
2008 Hamilton Tiger-Cats final roster
Quarterbacks: 1 Casey Printers; 4 Adam Tafralis; 17 Richie Williams; Running backs: 21 Kenton Keith; 49 Robert Pavlovic; 34 Jeff Piercy; 32 Tre Smith; Receivers: 87 Chris Bauman; 83 Eddie Cohen; 15 Chris Davis; 84 Earnest Jackson; 81 Chad Rempel; 85 Prechae Rodriguez; 5 Pat Woodcock	Offensive linemen: 63 Gerald Davis T; 67 Peter Dyakowski G; 62 Marwan Hage C; 52 George Hudson G/C; 61 Jordan Rempel T/G; 65 Charles Thomas T; Defensive linemen: 97 Darrell Adams DT; 7 Alain Kashama DE; 55 Sacha Lancaster DE; 9 Nautyn McKay-Loescher DE; 94 Terrance Patrick DE/DT; 99 Jermaine Reid DT; Special teams: 13 Nick Setta K/P	Linebackers: 48 Cornelius Anthony; 19 Sandy Beveridge; 54 Mike Botterill; 47 Sasha Glavic; 25 Markeith Knowlton; 41 Nick Kordic; 44 Ray Mariuz; 38 Matt Robichaud LS; Defensive backs: 31 Jykine Bradley; 29 Lawrence Gordon; 39 Sean Manning; 24 Jason Nedd; 18 Rontarius Robinson; 37 Bo Smith; 26 Chris Thompson; 3 Geoff Tisdale	Reserve roster: 68 J. P. Bekasiak G; 89 Scott Mitchell SB; 40 Cameron Siskowic LB; 22 Alan Zemaitis DB; Injured list: 20 Dylan Barker DB; 30 Terry Caulley RB; 53 Cedric Gagné-Marcoux G; 91 Dominic Lewis DT; 28 Jesse Lumsden RB; 51 Jordan Matechuk LS; 2 Tony Miles SB; 12 Quinton Porter QB; 33 Andre Sadeghian RB; 77 Jo Jo Walker SB; 23 John Williams RB; Italics indicate American players

== Regular season ==
The game on September 19 was the first game since the death of former Tiger Cats coach Ron Lancaster. The Ticats wore decals on their helmets for the game with a green number 23. It was Lancaster's number as a player. The stadium stood for a video tribute and a moment of silence before the game began, with his family standing near the sidelines. This was also the Canadian Football Hall of Fame game. This year's inductees included Doug Flutie, Mike (Pinball) Clemons, Mike Pringle, John Bonk and builder Tom Shepherd. The inductees received their jackets and unveiled their bronzed busts during the halftime.

=== Season standings ===
East Division
Pos	Team	Pld	W	L	T	PF	PA	PD	Pts
1	Montreal Alouettes (C, Q)	18	11	7	0	610	443	+167	22
2	Winnipeg Blue Bombers (Q)	18	8	10	0	435	490	−55	16
3	Toronto Argonauts	18	4	14	0	397	627	−230	8
4	Hamilton Tiger-Cats	18	3	15	0	441	593	−152	6

Source: "2008 Regular Season Standings". Canadian Football League. Archived from the original on 2009-02-05.
(C) First round bye; (Q) Qualified for playoffs

=== Transactions ===
- September 8: the Tiger-Cats fired Taaffe and replaced him with offensive co-ordinator Marcel Bellefeuille.
- September 9: Winnipeg acquired middle linebacker Zeke (And Destroy) Moreno and a conditional draft pick from Hamilton for its first-round draft pick in 2009 and the rights to Canadian defensive lineman Corey Mace.

=== Season schedule ===
Week	Date	Opponent	Score	Result	Attendance	Record
1	June 26	Montreal Alouettes	33–10	Loss	20,589	0–1
2	July 3	at Toronto Argonauts	32–13	Win	30,822	1–1
3	July 12	Saskatchewan Roughriders	33–28	Loss	20,874	1–2
4	July 17	at Calgary Stampeders	43–16	Loss	31,116	1–3
5	July 24	Edmonton Eskimos	19–13	Loss	21,402	1–4
6	July 31	at Montreal Alouettes	40–33	Loss	20,202	1–5
7	Aug 7	Toronto Argonauts	45–21	Win	19,423	2–5
8	Aug 14	at Winnipeg Blue Bombers	37–24	Loss	25,484	2–6
9	Bye					
10	Sept 1	Toronto Argonauts	34–31	Loss	25,911	2–7
11	Sept 6	BC Lions	35–12	Loss	18,723	2–8
12	Sept 13	at Edmonton Eskimos	38–33	Loss	37,500	2–9
13	Sept 19	Winnipeg Blue Bombers	25–23	Loss	19,102	2–10
14	Sept 27	at BC Lions	40–10	Loss	31,161	2–11
15	Oct 4	Montreal Alouettes	44–36	Win	20,423	3–11
16	Oct 13	at Montreal Alouettes	42–11	Loss	20,202	3–12
17	Oct 19	at Saskatchewan Roughriders	30–29	Loss	30,945	3–13
18	Oct 24	Calgary Stampeders	28–17	Loss	20,614	3–14
19	Nov 1	at Winnipeg Blue Bombers	44–30	Loss	24,595	3–15

=== Ron Lancaster ===
On Thursday, September 18, Ron Lancaster, 69, died from an apparent heart attack, less than two months after being diagnosed with lung cancer. Lancaster resigned as the Eskimos' head coach after the 1997 season to become the Hamilton Tiger-Cats' head coach and director of football operations. The Tiger-Cats reached the Grey Cup in their first season under Lancaster and won the title the following year. The Tiger-Cats were coached by Lancaster from 1998 to 2003, and again in 2006. The two-time CFL coach-of-the-year won 142 regular-season games on the sideline, placing him fourth all-time. |- |}

== Statistics ==
= Indicates team leader

=== Offence ===
==== Passing ====
Player	Att	Comp	%	Yards	TD	INT	Rating
Casey Printers	223	124	55.6	1693	5	10	68.8
Quinton Porter	177	118	66.7	1496	10	4	102.3
Richie Williams	100	60	60.0	984	3	5	82.3
Adam Tafralis	39	20	51.3	268	3	1	88.4
Nicholas Setta	2	2	100.0	33	0	0	154.2

==== Rushing ====
Despite leading the team in rushing yards, Jesse Lumsden was plagued by several injuries. On July 12, in a game against Saskatchewan, stretched knee ligaments sidelined him. Against Montreal on July 31, a tackler fell on his right ankle and injured him. In a game against Edmonton, played on September 13, Lumsden injured his surgically repaired shoulder.

Player	Att	Yards	Avg.	TD	Fumbles
Jesse Lumsden	87	584	6.7	5	1
Terry Caulley	66	448	6.8	6	0
Tre Smith	65	430	6.6	2	6
Casey Printers	48	386	8.0	6	7
Richie Williams	43	307	7.1	2	2
Kenton Keith	58	204	3.5	0	0
Quinton Porter	33	203	6.2	1	7
Jeff Piercy	14	48	3.4	0	0
John Williams	5	29	5.8	0	0

==== Receiving ====
Player	Receptions	Yards	Touchdowns
Scott Mitchell	24	463	0
Pat Woodcock	15	304	0
Jesse Lumsden	5	504	0
Chad Rempel	1	15	0

=== Defence ===
Player	Tackles	Sacks	Interceptions	Fumbles	Touchdowns
Markeith Knowlton	14	0	0	0	0
Nautyn McKay-Loescher	0	1	0	0	0
Zeke Moreno	7	0	0	0	0

== Awards and records ==
- Markeith Knowlton, CFL Eastern All-Star, Defence
- Nick Setta, CFL Eastern All-Star, Special Teams
- Chris Thompson, CFL Eastern All-Star, Defence
