= Stadnyk =

Stadnyk (Ukrainian: Стадник) is a gender-neutral Ukrainian surname that may refer to

- Alina Stadnyk (born 1991), Ukrainian wrestler
- Andriy Stadnyk (born 1982), Ukrainian wrestler
- Leonid Stadnyk (1970–2014), Ukrainian giant
- Mariia Stadnyk (born 1988), Ukrainian-Azerbaijani wrestler, wife of Andriy
- Mike Stadnyk (born 1986), Canadian football defensive end

== See also ==
- Stadnik
