= 97th Grey Cup =

2009 Canadian Football championship game

Montreal Alouettes	Saskatchewan Roughriders
(15–3)	(10–7–1)
28	27
Head coach: Marc Trestman	Head coach: Ken Miller
	1	2	3	4	Total
Montreal Alouettes	0	3	7	18	28
Saskatchewan Roughriders	10	7	3	7	27
- Date: November 29, 2009
- Stadium: McMahon Stadium
- Location: Calgary
- Most Valuable Player: Avon Cobourne, RB (Alouettes)
- Most Valuable Canadian: Ben Cahoon, SB (Alouettes)
- National anthem: Canadian Tenors
- Coin toss: Lt.-Gov. Norman Kwong
- Referee: Glen Johnson
- Halftime show: Blue Rodeo Stereos
- Attendance: 46,020

Broadcasters
- Network: TSN/TSN HD; RDS/RDS HD
- Announcers: (TSN): Chris Cuthbert, Glen Suitor, Dave Randorf, Jock Climie, Matt Dunigan, Chris Schultz (RDS): Denis Casavant, Pierre Vercheval, David Arsenault, Mike Sutherland
- Ratings: 6.1 million

The 97th Grey Cup was played on November 29, 2009, at McMahon Stadium in Calgary, Alberta, and decided the Canadian Football League (CFL) champion for the 2009 season. The Montreal Alouettes came from behind to defeat the Saskatchewan Roughriders 28–27, on a 33-yard field goal by Damon Duval as time ran out. Duval had actually missed a first attempt, but Saskatchewan was penalized for having too many men on the field, allowing Duval a second field goal attempt.

Montreal running back Avon Cobourne was named the Most Valuable Player of the game. Alouettes slotback Ben Cahoon received the Dick Suderman Trophy as the Grey Cup's Most Valuable Canadian.

== History ==
This was the fourth Grey Cup to be held in Calgary; the others were the 63rd Grey Cup (1975), the 81st Grey Cup (1993), and the 88th Grey Cup (2000). The game featured the West Division Champion Saskatchewan Roughriders and the East Division Champion Montreal Alouettes. It was the first time that these two teams played each other for the Grey Cup.

== Tickets ==
The prices for tickets ranged from $195 to $370 (Canadian dollars) for the general public. Stampeders season ticket holders were eligible for reduced rates, with prices between $119 and $295. The game sold out in August 2009.

== Events ==
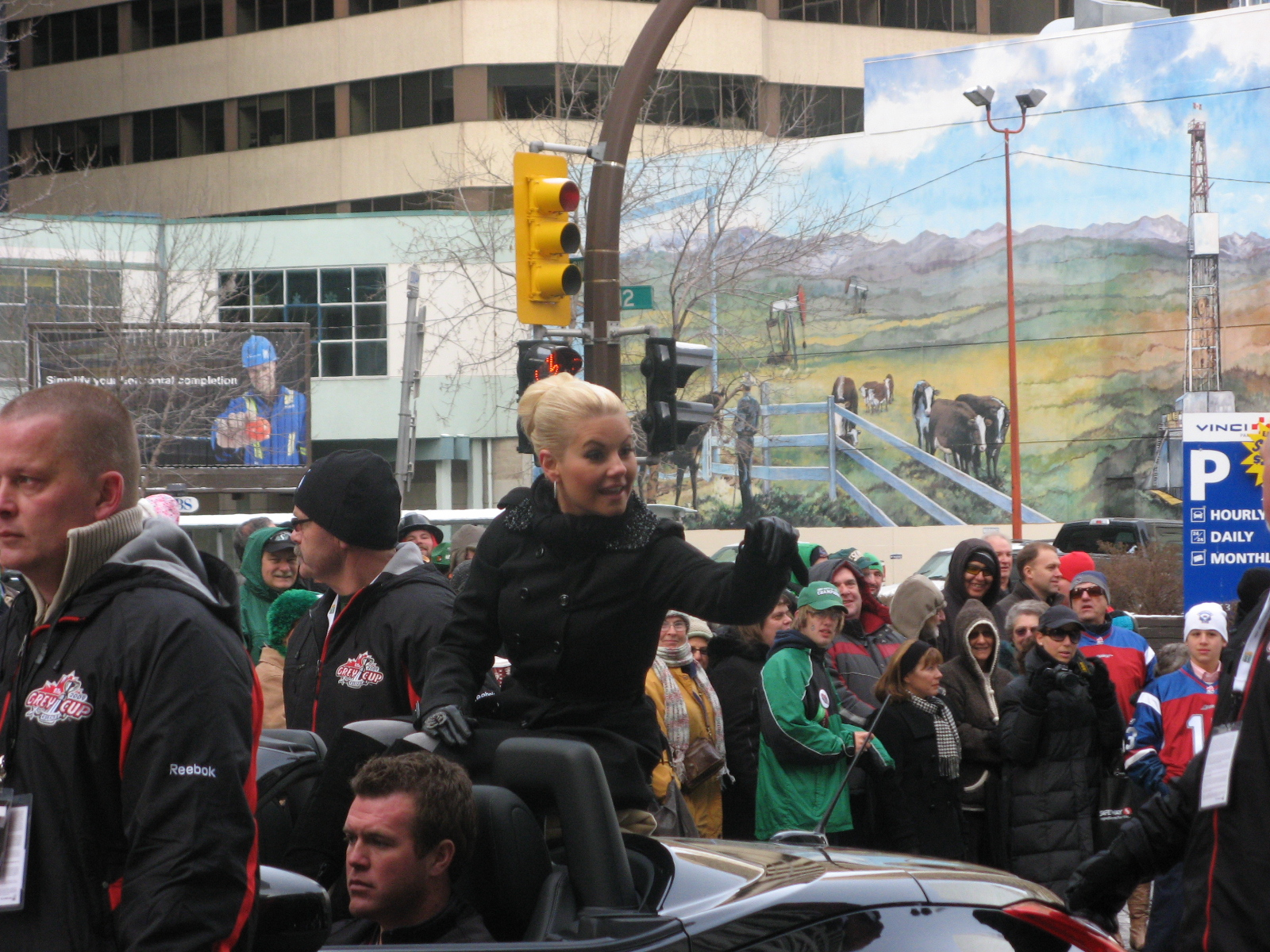
Elisha Cuthbert

On September 21, 2009, the Calgary Grey Cup committee announced that the 97th Grey Cup would feature the return of an official Grey Cup parade. They later named Elisha Cuthbert grand marshal of the parade, on November 13. On October 12, it was announced that Blue Rodeo would be the halftime show. The week's festivities also included the ENMAX Street Festival and Stage on Stephen Avenue; the Calgary Herald Olympic Plaza Family Fan Fest; the Molson Canadian Quick Six Saloon at the Telus Convention Centre; the Scotiabank Grey Cup Gala Dinner and Contest at the Pengrowth Saddledome, featuring Great Big Sea; and the McMahon Stadium Pre-Game Party with live entertainment featuring Stereos (band).

== Game summary ==
Montreal Alouettes (28) – TDs, Jamel Richardson, Avon Cobourne, Ben Cahoon; FGs Damon Duval (2); 2-point cons., Kerry Carter; cons., Duval (1); singles, Duval (1).

Saskatchewan Roughriders (27) – TDs, Andy Fantuz, Darian Durant; FGs Luca Congi (4); cons., Congi (2); singles, Louie Sakoda (1).

=== Scoring summary ===
First Quarter
SSK – FG Congi 40 (8:03) 3 – 0 SSK
SSK – TD Fantuz 8 pass from Durant (Congi convert) (13:43) 10 – 0 SSK
Second Quarter
MTL – FG Duval 28 (2:23) 10 – 3 SSK
SSK – FG Congi 44 (13:28) 13 – 3 SSK
SSK – Single Sakoda 85 kickoff, Taylor conceded in end zone (13:34) 14 – 3 SSK
SSK – FG Congi 9 (15:00) 17 – 3 SSK
Third Quarter
MTL – TD Richardson 8 pass from Calvillo (Duval convert) (7:13) 17 – 10 SSK
SSK – FG Congi 23 (14:09) 20 – 10 SSK
Fourth Quarter
MTL – Single Duval 52 punt went through end zone (1:42) 20 – 11 SSK
SSK – TD Durant 16 run (Congi convert) (4:28) 27 – 11 SSK
MTL – TD Cobourne 3 run (2-point convert, Carter 5 pass from Calvillo) (8:14) 27 – 19 SSK
MTL – TD Cahoon 11 pass from Calvillo (2-point convert failed) (13:15) 27 – 25 SSK
MTL – FG Duval 33 (15:00) 28 – 27 MTL

Montreal kicker, Damon Duval made good on his second opportunity to kick the winning field goal to give the Alouettes their first Grey Cup in seven years with a come-from-behind 28–27 victory over the Saskatchewan Roughriders at Calgary's McMahon Stadium.

From the start of the game, Saskatchewan dominated the game and led throughout the first 50 minutes. In the first quarter, Saskatchewan's quarterback, Darian Durant consistently moved the ball by mixing pass and run plays against Montreal's top ranked defence. The first Saskatchewan drive led to a Luca Congi field goal attempt that sailed wide, however, on their second possession, Congi was successful in his second attempt field goal attempt to give the Riders a 3–0 lead. Furthermore, the Saskatchewan defence also came up with big plays when Marcus Adams managed to strip the ball away from Montreal quarterback, Anthony Calvillo, while Keith Shologan managed to pick up the ball and ran it to Montreal's 8-yard line late in the first quarter. On the next play, Durant found slotback Andy Fantuz open in the end zone for an 8-yard touchdown pass to give Saskatchewan a 10–0 lead.

In the second quarter, Montreal looked to have gotten their offence back on track as Anthony Calvillo threw a pair of passes to slotback Ben Cahoon, which set up a 28-yard Damon Duval field goal to cut the lead to 10–3. Montreal got another opportunity to gain more points, however, fullback Kerry Carter turned the ball over when he fumbled the ball on the Saskatchewan 17 yard-line. Then things got worse for Montreal when Duval shanked two punts in a row, with the second punt only going for seven yards and out of bounds.

Due to the costly error, Saskatchewan took advantage. Luca Congi was successful kicking a 44-yard field goal, which was followed by a Louie Sakoda single in the ensuing kickoff, giving the Roughriders a 14–3 lead. On their next possession, Durant completed a pass to Andy Fantuz on Saskatchewan's second-to-last play of the second quarter that was spotted on Montreal's 2-yard line. After a video review confirmed that Fantuz stayed in bounds to make the catch, Luca Congi kicked his third field goal to close the first half giving Saskatchewan a 17–3 lead.

In the third quarter, Montreal forced Saskatchewan to punt on their first possession of the second half, and then proceeded to drive down the field. A key point was a play scrimmaging from the Saskatchewan 51-yard line where Calvillo received pass protection in the pocket and completed a pass to Jamel Richardson at the Saskatchewan 31-yard line. The Montreal Alouettes capped that 9-play drive with a touchdown when Calvillo completed an 8-yard pass to wide receiver Jamel Richardson midway through the quarter to cut the lead to 17–10. Nearly seven minutes later, Congi kicked his fourth field goal of the game to put Saskatchewan ahead 20–10. However, on the ensuing Saskatchewan kickoff, Montreal returner Brian Bratton evaded five would-be tacklers before getting pushed out of bounds by a sixth player of Saskatchewan's kick cover team at the Saskatchewan 50-yard line, giving Montreal a spark on special teams.

After a Damon Duval single 1:42 into the fourth quarter reduced the Saskatchewan lead to 20–11, Saskatchewan added to their lead in a drive that required less than three minutes of game time, completed when Durant rushed 16 yards for a touchdown. A successful single-point convert after the touchdown extended the Saskatchewan lead to 27–11. With the final 10:52 left in the fourth quarter, it looked like the Roughriders would secure their fourth championship as they were effectively running the ball at will against the Montreal defence. However, the Alouettes led by Anthony Calvillo battled back to erase Saskatchewan's 16-point lead.

With less than eight minutes to play in the fourth quarter, and Montreal trailing 27–11, Anthony Calvillo threw from the Montreal 43-yard line on a 2nd-and-10 attempt, and Brian Bratton caught the pass at the Saskatchewan 3-yard line. On the ensuing 1st-and-goal play, Avon Cobourne ran the ball into the endzone for a touchdown. Montreal attempted a two-point-convert, during which Calvillo stepped up in the pocket and successfully completed a pass to fullback Kerry Carter (with Saskatchewan linebacker Sean Lucas in close coverage of the Montreal fullback) to reduce the Saskatchewan lead to 27–19.

On a play scrimmaging from the Saskatchewan 33-yard-line with under six minutes left in the game, Darian Durant attempted a pass for Andy Fantuz that was intercepted by Montreal's Jerald Brown. On the ensuing Montreal possession, on a 2nd-and-10 from the Saskatchewan 32, Anthony Calvillo ran the ball to the Saskatchewan 25-yard-line, three yards short of a first down. This set up a 3rd-and-3 situation with 2:34 left to play. Down by eight points, the Alouettes gambled on third down. Needing to reach the Saskatchewan 22-yard line for a first down, Calvillo completed a pass to Jamel Richardson in double coverage, and Richardson reached the Saskatchewan 15-yard line for a first down. With under two minutes remaining, on a play starting at the Saskatchewan 11-yard-line Calvillo stepped up in the pocket and threw to an uncovered Ben Cahoon for a touchdown, bringing Montreal to within a converted two-point attempt from tying the game. The two-point attempt was missed when Donovan Alexander's pass interference on a Calvillo throw to Jamel Richardson was not called, and Saskatchewan maintained a 27–25 lead with just 1:45 remaining in the game. On the next Saskatchewan possession, the Roughriders could not manage a first down and were forced to punt after a two-and-out. On the Louie Sakoda punt, Montreal returner Brian Bratton fumbled the ball as he was hit by a Saskatchewan special teams player, but the football was recovered by Montreal's Etienne Boulay, giving Montreal the chance to drive the field with less than a minute to go in the game. Montreal's task was made more difficult since the football went approximately ten yards towards the Montreal endzone before being recovered by Etienne Boulay, meaning the Alouettes needed to drive down the field even further to be able to score.

With 0:31 remaining, on a 2nd-and-10 from the Montreal 34-yard-line, Calvillo completed a pass to Jamel Richardson that moved the Montreal offence to the Saskatchewan 53-yard-line with 0:24 left in the game. On the ensuing 1st-and-10 from the Saskatchewan 53-yard-line, Calvillo threw a pass to Montreal receiver Kerry Watkins, which Watkins caught very close to the ground at the Saskatchewan 40-yard-line, that was ruled incomplete. The play was checked with video review and it was judged that there was not sufficient evidence to overturn the incomplete pass ruling, which set up a Montreal 2nd-and-10 attempt from the Saskatchewan 53-yard-line with 0:10 remaining in the game. Calvillo again threw to receiver Kerry Watkins, with Watkins catching the pass and getting tackled at the Saskatchewan 36 yard line with 0:05 left in the game. With Montreal trailing 27–25, Montreal kicker Damon Duval missed wide right on a 43-yard field goal attempt that could have given Montreal the victory. Saskatchewan's Jason Armstead returned the missed field goal kick from inside the Saskatchewan endzone to the Saskatchewan 6-yard-line and kneeled to end the play, at which point Saskatchewan players began to celebrate what they thought was a win. However, Saskatchewan had thirteen players on the field during the Montreal field goal attempt, and referee Glen Johnson made the call of, "Illegal substitution, too many men on the field, Saskatchewan. It's a ten yard penalty, we'll repeat first down". With Saskatchewan's 10-yard penalty for too many men on the field, the Alouettes moved to the Saskatchewan 26-yard-line with 0:00 on the clock (a game cannot end with a defensive penalty) and attempted a 33-yard field goal for the win on the following play. Duval converted the 33-yard field goal to score three points on the final play and give Montreal the Grey Cup.

=== Notable game facts ===
- The 97th Grey Cup was watched by 6.1 million Canadian viewers, making it the most-watched telecast in Canada for 2009.
- Both teams played in their 17th Grey Cup game.

== 2009 CFL playoffs ==
=== Division Semi-finals ===
==== East Semi-Final ====
Date and time: Sunday, November 15, 1:00 PM Eastern Standard Time
Venue: Ivor Wynne Stadium, Hamilton, Ontario

Team	Q1	Q2	Q3	Q4	OT	Total
BC Lions	3	13	7	4	7	34
Hamilton Tiger-Cats	3	3	10	11	0	27

The BC Lions became the second West Division team to win in the East Semi-Finals by defeating the Hamilton Tiger-Cats 34–27 in overtime, earning the right to play against the Montreal Alouettes in the East Final.

Former Tiger-Cat quarterback Casey Printers threw for 360 yards, rushed for a touchdown, and threw the winning eight-yard touchdown toss to Ian Smart in overtime to seal the win in his return to Hamilton.

Hamilton came into the game as one of the CFL's hottest teams, having won three straight, whereas the Lions finished the regular season losing three straight and earning the crossover playoff berth only after the Tiger-Cats defeated the Winnipeg Blue Bombers 39–17 to clinch second in the East and eliminate Winnipeg from post-season contention.

Printers was masterful in leading the Lions on two long scoring marches from inside their own 10-yard line that not only resulted in 10 points for the Lions, but prevented the Tiger-Cats from getting the ball in good field position and kept Hamilton's defence on the turf for long stretches. Printers was also very effective at throwing the ball away whenever he came under pressure from the Tiger-Cat defence, despite being sacked four times.

The biggest question in this game was the Tiger-Cats' decision to not exploit the biggest weakness in the Lions' defence. B.C. came into the game having the CFL's worst run defence, averaging 138 yards per game. However, the Tiger-Cats ran the ball only seven times for 35 yards. Hamilton running back DeAndra' Cobb, who ran for 267 yards in the two regular-season games the teams played (with Hamilton winning both), had just six carries for 33 yards in regulation.

Still, after trailing 16–6 at halftime, Hamilton eventually tied the game at 16–16 on quarterback Kevin Glenn's 28-yard touchdown pass to Dave Stala, who made an amazing diving catch at 9:05 of the third quarter. It came after Hamilton had to settle for a Nick Setta field goal at 4:24, after a Chris Thompson fumble recovery and return to the Lions' 20-yard line.

But the B.C. Lions countered with Rolly Lambala's one-yard touchdown run at 12:14, a major set up by a 34-yard pass interference call on Hamilton's Jykine Bradley. Printers then took the Lions on an 11-play, 71-yard drive that culminated in a 33-yard Paul McCallum field goal that put the visitors ahead 26–16 at 3:05 of the fourth quarter.

Although B.C. led 27–16 with 5:00 left, Hamilton booted a field goal with 2:13 remaining to get them within reach. On their next possession, Dave Stala pulled in a nine-yard touchdown pass from Glenn for his second touchdown reception. After the touchdown, the Tiger-Cats scored on a two-point conversion attempt to tie the game when Glenn again threw a pass to wide-open receiver Marquay McDaniel in the end zone to send it to overtime.

After pulling off a last-minute miracle to tie the game, Hamilton fans became overjoyed as it seemed the momentum had switched to their home team. However, it was not to be.

Before overtime, Hamilton won the coin toss and elected for the Lions to have first possession of the football, which turned out to be a costly decision. On their first possession, Casey Printers and the B.C. offence took two plays to score the winning touchdown when Printers tossed the ball to Ian Smart, putting the Lions ahead 34–27.

The Tiger-Cats had a chance to tie the game but were shut down by Lion defence, which proved to be the difference in the extra minutes of play following the B.C. touchdown.

Emmanuel Arceneaux was the top Lion receiver on the day, pulling in six receptions for a total of 120 yards, while Paul McCallum was good on all four of his field goal attempts, the longest a 43-yarder. B.C. generated 445 yards in total offence to Hamilton's 440, while the Tiger-Cats picked up 437 aerial yards. Nick Setta was also good on all four of his field goal attempts for Hamilton.

The Lions then headed to Montreal to play against the Alouettes at the Olympic Stadium, for a chance to advance to the Grey Cup.

==== West Semi-Final ====
Date and time: Sunday, November 15, 2:30 PM Mountain Standard Time
Venue: McMahon Stadium, Calgary, Alberta

Team	Q1	Q2	Q3	Q4	Total
Edmonton Eskimos	0	7	7	7	21
Calgary Stampeders	0	9	7	8	24

The Stampeders opened the post-season the way they ended the regular season in Regina where they had three second-half drives and were within 20 yards of the end zone, but were only able produce two field goals. In the opening half, the Stampeders again squandered three chances to score touchdowns from inside the red zone and settled for three Sandro DeAngelis field goals. Three of those Stampeders drives in the second quarter ended with Calgary quarterback Henry Burris either shedding the ball under pressure or throwing an incompletion, which brought DeAngelis out onto the field.

On the other side, the Edmonton Eskimos were also unable to score a touchdown in the red zone as Stampeder cornerback Brandon Browner stopped Edmonton's running back Arkee Whitlock twice from within five yards early in the second quarter to prevent a touchdown. The Eskimos depended on their kicker, Noel Prefontaine, to kick for two field goals and a last-minute single point for all of Edmonton's first-half points.

With both teams' inability to score a touchdown during the first two quarters of play, Calgary had a 9–7 lead into halftime.

However, in the third quarter, Henry Burris threw a nine-yard touchdown pass to receiver Arjei Franklin to take a 16–7 lead at 5:25 of the third quarter, capping an eight-play, 57-yard drive. However, Edmonton's Skyler Green countered Calgary's touchdown score with a 93-yard touchdown return on the ensuing Calgary kickoff.

Heading into the fourth quarter, the Stampeders led by two points, 16–14, before Calgary punter Burke Dales kicked a 67-yard single 19 seconds in to give Calgary a three-point lead. Then at 2:52 of the fourth quarter, Henry Burris threw a 29-yard touchdown pass to Romby Bryant to increase their lead to 24–14.

Although the Edmonton Eskimos seemed to be out of it, the Stampeders gave them a chance after they were penalized for 35 yards, including two roughing the passer calls on Calgary's Charleston Hughes, which contributed to the Eskimos' second touchdown at 7:44 of the fourth quarter when quarterback Ricky Ray rushed in for the 1-yard score and trailed 24–21.

However, Edmonton's chances to get within field goal range to tie the game with four minutes remaining in the fourth quarter were stopped, after taking two costly holding penalties that kept them in their end of the field and were forced to punt the ball away, after Calgary's defensive tackle, DeVone Claybrooks sacked Ricky Ray for a 10-yard loss, which forced Edmonton to rely on their defence to get the ball back. However, the Edmonton defence were unable to stop the Calgary offence, who simply played out the clock to eventually win the Battle of Alberta match-up.

With the win, the Calgary Stampeders ended a three-game losing streak against the Edmonton Eskimos in divisional semi-final games dating back to 2005 and went 4–1 against the Eskimos this season. They will now play the Saskatchewan Roughriders at Mosaic Stadium at Taylor Field for a chance to advance to the Grey Cup and play in front of their home fans in Calgary.

Henry Burris rushed for 63 yards and completed 19 passes on 32 attempts for 264 yards and threw for two touchdown passes, while his counterpart, Ricky Ray, was 18-for-30 and 162 yards, but no touchdowns. While Stampeders running back, Joffrey Reynolds, the West Division nominee for the league's most outstanding player, rushed for 127 yards, which is the fourth-highest in a Stampeder playoff game.

=== Division Finals ===
==== East Final ====
Date and time: Sunday, November 22, 1:00 PM Eastern Standard Time
Venue: Olympic Stadium, Montreal, Quebec

Team	Q1	Q2	Q3	Q4	Total
BC Lions	3	8	7	0	18
Montreal Alouettes	17	14	14	11	56

The Montreal Alouettes had a dominant 15–3 season while the BC Lions was only 8–10, but the East final was widely seen as a toss-up due to the strong form of BC quarterback, Casey Printers after joining the Lions in September and because of the Alouettes previous struggles against their rival from Vancouver. However, the Alouettes set a franchise playoff record by scoring 56 points and dominated the BC Lions throughout the game.

The game turned only seven minutes in the first quarter, after each team exchanged field goals, BC running back, Martell Mallett fumbled the ball on the Lions' 22 that was eventually recovered by Montreal's Shea Emry. On the next play, Montreal quarterback, Anthony Calvillo found wide receiver, Jamel Richardson all alone in the end zone and threw his first touchdown pass of the game to give the Alouettes a 10–3 lead. On their next offensive possession, the BC Lions turned the ball over again, when Casey Printers threw an interception to Montreal's Billy Parker. Parker returned the ball for 45 yards, which eventually set up a four-yard touchdown pass by Calvillo to Kerry Watkins. The Alouettes ended the first quarter with a 17-3 lead.

Early in the second quarter, BC defensive end Lavar Glover missed his opportunity to tackle Kerry Watkins, which led to a 91-yard return that set up a seven-yard TD toss by Calvillo to Richardson for a 24–3, Alouettes lead. The Lions scored their first touchdown of the game when Casey Printers threw a 14-yard touchdown pass to wide receiver, Paris Jackson that was started when Montreal's Larry Taylor uncharacteristically dropped a punt return, which was recovered by Lions' safety Tad Crawford deep into the Alouettes side of the field. However, the Alouettes offence came right back when Anthony Calvillo threw his fourth touchdown of the game to wide receiver, Brian Bratton to give the Alouettes a comfortable 31–10 lead. Before the end of the second half, BC kicker Paul McCallum punted the ball into the endzone to give BC an extra point, although the Lions' were trailing by 20 points into halftime.

At 4:54 into the third quarter, Lions' wide receiver and kick returner, Ryan Grice-Mullen returned a 106-yard punt return to score a BC touchdown to cut the Montreal lead to 13, and broke the previous playoff record of 103-yards by Eskimos' legend Henry "Gizmo" Williams, which was set back in 1992. Momentum could have switched for the Lions at that point, however, Grice-Mullen's touchdown return was the last time that BC could muster any further offence and scoring in the game.

In the remainder of the game, the Montreal Alouettes scored their remaining 25 points. In the third quarter, Anthony Calvillo threw another touchdown pass (14 yards) to Brian Bratton to tie a league playoff record for throwing five touchdowns in a single game. Later on, in the third quarter, Montreal's Cory Huclack blocked a Paul McCallum punt, which was recovered by Jamel Richardson, who scored his third touchdown of the game.

In the fourth quarter, Alouettes' kicker, Damon Duval added a field goal and a single point on a missed field goal to give Montreal a playoff franchise record of 49 points, which broke the previous record of 48 points that they scored against the Hamilton Tiger-Cats in 1956. Montreal then scored their remaining touchdown on a John Bowman 41-yard interception return off BC backup quarterback, Travis Lulay, who replaced Printers late in the game.

With the blowout victory the Montreal Alouettes will head into Calgary to play in their seventh Grey Cup game in ten years and will try to overcome a disappointing 1–5 record in those games to become champions for the first time since 2002.

==== West Final ====
Date and time: Sunday, November 22, 3:30 PM Central Standard Time
Venue: Mosaic Stadium at Taylor Field, Regina, Saskatchewan

Team	Q1	Q2	Q3	Q4	Total
Calgary Stampeders	3	7	1	6	17
Saskatchewan Roughriders	0	10	14	3	27

The defending Grey Cup champions, Calgary Stampeders were hoping to win and repeat as champions on their home field at McMahon Stadium. However, they had to get past the Saskatchewan Roughriders who after 33 years finished first in the West Division and had home field advantage with the raucous Rider Nation on their side.

In the first half, the Calgary Stampeders showed signs as if they would succeed when kicker, Sandro DeAngelis opened the scoring on the game's first possession with a 47-yard field goal to make it 3–0 Calgary in the first quarter. Calgary added to their lead when running back, Joffrey Reynolds, the CFL rushing leader, rushed for 17 yards for the touchdown to make it 10–0, Stampeders.

However, the Saskatchewan Roughriders responded at 7:54 in the second quarter, when quarterback, Darian Durant threw an 8-yard touchdown pass to Chris Getzlaf to make it 10–7, Calgary. Then at 12:41 of the second quarter, kicker Luca Congi kicked an 18-yard field goal to tie the game at 10–10. While both teams were able to score 10 points, the first half was dominated by both defences, which kept the game tied at halftime.

At the start of the third quarter, Saskatchewan broke the tie as Darian Durant threw two touchdown passes to give the Roughriders a commanding lead over Calgary. The first touchdown pass came at 2:19 when Durant threw a 9-yard touchdown pass to Andy Fantuz giving the Riders a 17–10 lead. Then at 11:04 of the third quarter, Durant threw a 16-yard touchdown pass to Rob Bagg giving Saskatchewan a commanding 24–11 lead, as Calgary was only able to score a single point in the third quarter.

In the fourth quarter, Saskatchewan added to their point total when Congi kicked a 43-yard field goal to give the Riders a 27–11 lead. Late in the game, Calgary cut the lead to 10, when Henry Burris threw a 4-yard touchdown completion to Jeremaine Copeland at 13:47. However, when Calgary attempted a two-point convert to make it an 8-point deficit, Burris' pass was intercepted in the end zone. That sealed the victory for the Saskatchewan Roughriders and ended Calgary's hope to become repeat champions on home turf.

With the victory, Saskatchewan met the Montreal Alouettes at the 97th Grey Cup game at Calgary's McMahon Stadium, which also marked the first time that both these teams had met in a championship game.
