= East–West Bowl =

East–West Bowl may refer to:

- East/West Bowl (Key & Peele), a recurring sketch in the comedy show Key & Peele
- East–West Shrine Game, charity college all-star game since 1925
- San Diego East-West Christmas Classic, 1921 and 1922 college football bowl games
- Tournament East-West football game, original name for the Rose Bowl Game
- U Sports East–West Bowl, an annual Canadian Interuniversity Sport football game since 2003
