= Thind =

Tribe of Jats

- Classification: Jat
- Religions: Hinduism; Sikhism; Islam
- Languages: Punjabi; Sindhi
- Country: India; Pakistan
- Region: Punjab; Sindh; Rajasthan; Haryana‌; Azad Kashmir
- Ethnicity: Punjabi; Sindhi

Thind is a tribe of the Jat community. The name is found among Hindu, Muslim, and Sikh communities.

== Surname ==
Notable people with the surname Thind, who may or may not have a connection to the clan, include:

- Balwant Singh Thind, finance minister of Punjab
- Bhagat Singh Thind (1892–1967), writer and immigrant to the USA
- Garry Thind, Canadian politician
- Gurminder Thind (born 1984), player of American football
- Muhammad Hassan Nawaz Thind (born 2002), Pakistani cricketer
- Kartar Singh Thind (1917–1991), botanist
- Sadhu Singh Thind, politician
