= Ken McEachern =

Canadian gridiron football player (born 1953)

No. 20
- Position: Defensive back

Personal information
- Born: January 14, 1953 (age 73); Canada
- Listed height: 6 ft 0 in (1.83 m)
- Listed weight: 190 lb (86 kg)

Career information
- College: Weber State

Career history
- 1974–1982: Saskatchewan Roughriders
- 1983: Toronto Argonauts
- 1984: Saskatchewan Roughriders

Awards and highlights
- Grey Cup champion (1983); 2× CFL All-Star (1980, 1981); CFL East All-Star (1983); 3× CFL West All-Star (1976, 1980, 1981); Tom Pate Memorial Award (1981)

Ken McEachern (born January 14, 1953) is a Canadian former professional football player who played eleven years in the Canadian Football League (CFL).

== Career ==
McEachern played defensive back for the Saskatchewan Roughriders and Toronto Argonauts from 1974 to 1984. He was a CFL All-Star in '80 and '81 and helped the Argonauts win the 71st Grey Cup in 1983. He played his college football at Weber State University.

== Family ==
His son, Mike McEachern is a former linebacker at Western Illinois University and was drafted 22nd overall in the 2008 CFL draft.
