= Mike McEachern =

Canadian football player (born 1986)

No. 20
- Position: Safety

Personal information
- Born: June 8, 1986 (age 40); Calgary, Alberta
- Listed height: 6 ft 1 in (1.85 m)
- Listed weight: 205 lb (93 kg)

Career information
- College: Western Illinois
- CFL draft: 2008: 3rd round, 22nd overall pick

Career history
- 2009–2010: BC Lions
- Stats at CFL.ca

Michael McEachern (born June 8, 1986) is a current professional Flag Football player in the Dynasty Football league for team Southside & former professional Canadian football defensive back who played for the BC Lions. He was drafted by the Lions of the Canadian Football League in the third round of the 2008 CFL draft. He played college football for the Western Illinois Leathernecks. He is the son of former CFL All Star Ken McEachern who played strong safety for the Saskatchewan Roughriders and the Toronto Argonauts.
