= Kerry Watkins =

American gridiron football player (born 1979)

Profile
- Position: Wide receiver

Personal information
- Born: May 16, 1979 (age 47); LaPlace, Louisiana, U.S.
- Listed height: 5 ft 11 in (1.80 m)
- Listed weight: 186 lb (84 kg)

Career information
- College: Georgia Tech

Career history
- 2003: New England Patriots*
- 2004–2011: Montreal Alouettes
- * Offseason or practice squad member only

Awards and highlights
- 2× Grey Cup champion (2009, 2010); 2× CFL All-Star (2005, 2009); 4× CFL East All-Star (2005, 2006, 2008, 2009); Second-team All-ACC (2002)
- Stats at CFL.ca

Kerry Watkins (born May 16, 1979) is a former professional Canadian football wide receiver who spent his entire eight-year career with the Montreal Alouettes of the Canadian Football League (CFL). He was named a CFL East All-Star in 2005, 2006 and 2008, and a CFL All-Star in 2005. Watkins won Grey Cup championships in 2009 and 2010 with the Alouettes. He played college football for the Georgia Tech Yellow Jackets.

== Professional career ==
=== New England Patriots ===
Following his college career, Watkins signed with the New England Patriots of the National Football League in May 2003. He was later released during the following August after spending training camp with the team.

=== Montreal Alouettes ===
Watkins signed with the Montreal Alouettes of the Canadian Football League in June 2004. He played in four of the first five games but missed the rest of the season due to a shoulder injury. In 2005, he recorded his first touchdown, his first 1,000-yard receiving season and his first CFL All-star selection. He was part of the 2005 Alouettes' foursome of 1,000-yard receivers, tying the record (set by the 2004 Alouettes receivers of Ben Cahoon with 1183 yards, Jeremaine Copeland with 1154 yards, Thyron Anderson with 1147 yards, and Kwame Cavil with 1090 yards) for most 1,000-yard receivers on one team in a season. Kerry Watkins' 1364 yards receiving on the 2005 Alouettes team combined with the performance of Watkins' fellow Alouette receivers Terry Vaughn (1113 yards), Ben Cahoon (1067 yards), and Dave Stala (1037 yards) making the 2005 Alouettes only the second team in CFL history to have four receivers on one team reaching the 1,000-yard receiving mark in one season.

Watkins' 2005 season was statistically his best, setting career highs in receptions (97), yardage (1,364) and longest reception (75 yards) while also scoring the second-most touchdowns in a season with nine. In 2008, Watkins scored ten touchdowns.

Watkins would go on to record five straight 1,000-yard seasons between 2005 and 2009 while falling just short in 2010 with 970 after he missed five games due to injury. He won Grey Cup championships with the Alouettes in 2009 and 2010, making a critical 17-yard catch in the 2009 game to put the Alouettes in field goal range to kick the winning points. His 2011 season was curtailed due to injury where he only managed to catch 31 passes for 395 yards and three touchdowns. Nonetheless, he finished the season in second place on the Alouettes all-time receptions list at 515 catches, behind all-time franchise and CFL leader Ben Cahoon. Following the 2011 season, Watkins announced his retirement on January 31, 2012.

== Statistics ==
Receiving		Regular season						Playoffs
Year	Team	Games	No.	Yards	Avg	Long	TD	Games	No.	Yards	Avg	Long	TD
2004	MTL	4	4	36	9.0	19	0	0	0	0	0.0	0	0
2005	MTL	17	97	1,364	14.1	75	9	3	15	143	9.5	28	0
2006	MTL	17	86	1,153	13.4	68	5	2	6	118	19.7	47	0
2007	MTL	15	76	1,092	14.4	70	5	1	5	158	31.6	65	1
2008	MTL	16	107	1,178	14.0	36	10	2	7	85	12.1	21	0
2009	MTL	18	89	1,243	15.3	71	8	2	5	132	26.4	90	1
2010	MTL	13	56	970	17.3	54	8	2	6	99	16.5	24	0
2011	MTL	12	31	395	12.7	22	3	Placed on injured reserve
CFL totals		112	515	7,431	14.4	75	48	12	44	735	16.7	90	2
