= U Sports East–West Bowl =

Annual Canadian football game

- Stadium: Warrior Field
- Location: Waterloo, ON
- Previous stadiums: University Stadium (2003–2005); TELUS-UL Stadium (2006–2007); Ron Joyce Stadium (2008, 2022–2023); TD Stadium (2009–2014); Molson Stadium (2015–2016); TELUS-UL Stadium (2017–2018); MNP Park (2019)
- Previous locations: Waterloo, ON (2003–2005); Quebec City, QC (2006–2007); Hamilton, ON (2008); London, ON (2009–2014); Montreal, QC (2015–2016); Quebec City, QC (2017–2018); Ottawa, ON (2019); Hamilton, ON (2022–2023)
- Operated: 2003–present

Sponsors
- Valero Energy (2017–2018)

The U Sports East–West Bowl is an annual preseason Canadian university football all-star game which showcases the top U Sports football prospects in the country who will be eligible for the following year's CFL draft. The East–West Bowl is organized by the Canadian University Football Coaches Association (CUFCA) with the support of the Canadian Football League (CFL). It brings together over 90 of the top U Sports football players for a week of practices and evaluation, culminating with the annual all-star game. A national committee of U Sports head coaches selects the participants from a pool of players nominated by their respective universities. Players who are generally in their third year of eligibility are the prime candidates for nomination. Every U Sports football program is represented by a minimum of three and a maximum of four players who will be eligible for the CFL draft the following year. Each school submits a list of six players they nominate. A committee of U Sports coaches and CFL representatives review the nominations and determine who gets invited.

Out of 22 East–West Bowls played as of 2026, the West team has won 15 times and the East team 7 times.

== History ==
Former logo of the East–West Bowl.

The East–West Bowl began in 2003, when U Sports was known as Canadian Interuniversity Sport (CIS). The first edition was held in Waterloo, Ontario at Wilfrid Laurier University. Wilfrid Laurier hosted the first three years of the event in Waterloo from 2003 to 2005. The next two years of the East–West Bowl, 2006 and 2007, took place in Quebec City at Laval University, followed by McMaster University hosting the 2008 game in Hamilton, Ontario. Western University then hosted the event for six consecutive years from 2009 to 2014 in London, Ontario. In 2015 and 2016, the event was hosted for the first time by McGill University in Montreal, Quebec. The game was awarded to Laval again for 2017 and 2018. The game was hosted by Carleton in 2019 and was scheduled to be hosted by Carleton in 2020, but was cancelled due to the COVID-19 pandemic. With the game also cancelled in 2021 due to the ongoing pandemic, McMaster was named as the host for the 2022 game. After back-to-back years in Hamilton, the University of Waterloo was named as the host for the event in 2024, 2025, and 2026.

CIS changed its name to U Sports in October 2016.

=== Notable past participants ===
Notable past participants of the East–West Bowl who have moved on to have careers in the CFL (Canadian Football League) and/or NFL (National Football League) include: Hec Crighton trophy winners Benoit Groulx of Laval, Daryl Stephenson of Windsor, Andy Fantuz of Western, Jesse Lumsden of McMaster and Tommy Denison of Queen's. Former Sherbrooke University player Samuel Giguère and Calgary University graduate Dan Federkeil, were both former members of the 2010 Super Bowl finalist Indianapolis Colts. Former Western University Mustang, Vaughn Martin, was drafted in the fourth round of the 2009 NFL Collegiate Draft by the San Diego Chargers.

=== East–West Bowl results ===
Year	Location	Winning team	Score
2003	Laurier	West	10–5
2004	Laurier	West	21–12
2005	Laurier	West	34–16
2006	Laval	West	34–26 (OT)
2007	Laval	West	22–19 (OT)
2008	McMaster	East	25–12
2009	Western	West	16–7
2010	McGill	East	12–9
2011	Western	East	34–27 (OT)
2012	Western	East	24–16
2013	Western	West	18–17
2014	Western	East	19–12
2015	McGill	East	29–21
2016	McGill	West	29–14
2017	Laval	West	37–13
2018	Laval	West	15–14
2019	Carleton	West	35–17
2020	Carleton	Cancelled due to the COVID-19 pandemic	
2021	Carleton	Cancelled due to the COVID-19 pandemic	
2022	McMaster	West	11–8
2023	McMaster	East	37–0
2024	Waterloo	West	16–1
2025	Waterloo	West	32–20
2026	Waterloo	West	28–27

== East–West Week ==
Players participate in week-long activities, drills and evaluations which are more important than the actual all-star game. The game itself is the final event of what is a busy schedule for CFL prospects and U Sports players over the last seven days.

Players are housed by the hosting university for the week and attend daily practices and meetings in which they are constantly evaluated on both their physical football capabilities as well as their mental knowledge and understanding of the game. Players that comprise the East team practice with each other for most of the week, while players on the West team do the same; however, there are certain practices where East players will match up against players from the West team in a variety of team and one-on-one competitions. Players are coached by a variety of different coaches from different U Sports members throughout the week. Additionally, some of the coaching also comes directly from CFL coaches and all of it comes under the watchful eyes of CFL player personnel, coaches and executives.

During the week of practices and evaluations players also compete in a combine which puts the players through a variety of drills designed to evaluate and assess the athletes agility, speed and strength. The East–West combine is a dry run for players who hope to receive invites to CFL combine the following spring.

=== Combine Test and Evaluation ===
The combine includes the following drills which athletes will be tested and evaluated on:

- 40 yard dash
- Bench press (225 lb repetitions)
- Vertical jump
- Broad jump
- 20 yard shuttle run
- 3 cone drill
- Position-specific drills
- Physical measurements

== Teams ==
As of 2023, the East Team contains players from the AUS and RSEQ conferences as well as players from Carleton, Ottawa, Queen's, and York. The West Team is made up of players from Canada West and the remaining Ontario University Association (OUA) universities. In 2023, the Simon Fraser Red Leafs also had players invited to play in the game following the controversial cancellation of the school's football program.

=== East Team ===
- Acadia Axemen
- Mount Allison Mounties
- Saint Mary's Huskies
- St. Francis Xavier X-Men
- Bishop's Gaiters
- Concordia Stingers
- Laval Rouge et Or
- McGill Redbirds
- Montreal Carabins
- Sherbrooke Vert et Or
- Carleton Ravens
- Ottawa Gee-Gees
- Queen's Gaels
- York Lions

=== West Team ===
- Guelph Gryphons
- McMaster Marauders
- Toronto Varsity Blues
- Waterloo Warriors
- Western Mustangs
- Wilfrid Laurier Golden Hawks
- Windsor Lancers
- Alberta Golden Bears
- Calgary Dinos
- Manitoba Bisons
- Regina Rams
- Saskatchewan Huskies
- UBC Thunderbirds
- Simon Fraser Red Leafs
