= Keith Shologan =

Canadian gridiron football player (born 1985)

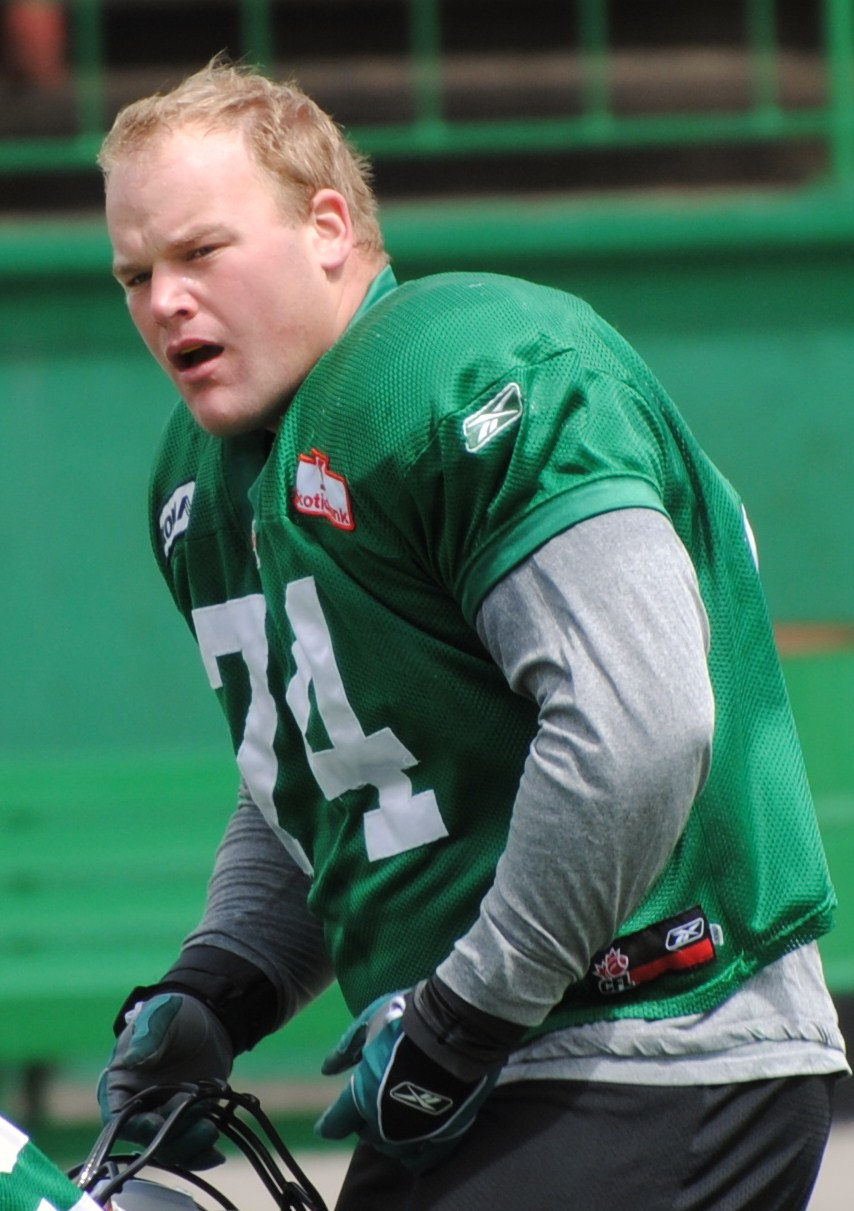
- Shologan with the Saskatchewan Roughriders in 2010

No. 72
- Position: Defensive tackle

Personal information
- Born: November 26, 1985 (age 40); Spruce Grove, Alberta, Canada
- Listed height: 6 ft 2 in (1.88 m)
- Listed weight: 295 lb (134 kg)

Career information
- College: UCF
- CFL draft: 2008: 1st round, 4th overall pick
- Expansion draft: 2013: 2nd round

Career history
- 2008: San Diego Chargers*
- 2008–2013: Saskatchewan Roughriders
- 2014–2015: Ottawa Redblacks
- 2016: Winnipeg Blue Bombers
- 2017: Montreal Alouettes
- * Offseason or practice squad member only

Awards and highlights
- Grey Cup champion (2013); Grey Cup Most Valuable Canadian (2010); Second-team All-Conference USA (2007)
- Stats at CFL.ca

Keith Shologan (born November 26, 1985) is a Canadian former professional football defensive tackle who played in the Canadian Football League (CFL). He played college football for the UCF Knights. Shologan was a member of the San Diego Chargers, Saskatchewan Roughriders, Ottawa Redblacks, Winnipeg Blue Bombers, and Montreal Alouettes.

== College career ==
Shologan spent four seasons at the University of Central Florida and also started all four years on the Knights' defensive line. As a senior in 2007, he recorded 33 tackles and 2.5 sacks. His performance earned him All-Conference USA second-team honours.

== Professional career ==
=== San Diego Chargers ===
Shologan was considered a top pick in the 2008 CFL draft and a possible pick of the Edmonton Eskimos along with Dimitri Tsoumpas and Samuel Giguere. However Shologan signed with the San Diego Chargers. He attended the Chargers training camp; however, he was cut on June 21.

=== Saskatchewan Roughriders ===
A week after he was cut by San Diego he signed with the Saskatchewan Roughriders of the Canadian Football League (CFL). He joined Saskatchewan in week eight after they drafted him with the fourth pick in the 2008 draft. He appeared in one game as a backup defensive lineman against the Edmonton Eskimos and recorded two tackles. The Roughriders lost Shologan's debut by a score of 27–10. During the Roughriders 2009 training camp, Shologan was called a "standout" by head coach Ken Miller, and when told about Miller's comments, Shologan responded by saying "aw shucks". On August 16, 2009, Shologan scored his first ever CFL touchdown against the Hamilton Tiger-Cats as a tight end on a 1-yard reception in the end zone from Steven Jyles. After the 2010 Grey Cup, Shologan was named the game's Top Canadian for his performance, despite the Roughriders loss to the Montreal Alouettes.

=== Ottawa Redblacks ===
On December 16, 2013, Shologan was selected by the Ottawa Redblacks (CFL) in the 2013 CFL Expansion Draft. Shologan played with the Redblacks in their inaugural season, and their second season, before leaving in free-agency in February 2016. During his time in Ottawa he played in 34 games, amassing 41 tackles and 8 quarterback sacks.

=== Winnipeg Blue Bombers ===
On 9 February 2016, Shologan signed with the Winnipeg Blue Bombers (CFL). In one season in Winnipeg he contributed with 22 tackles and 2 sacks over 18 games. He was released by the Bombers prior to free agency on January 31, 2017.

=== Montreal Alouettes ===
The following day (February 1, 2017) Shologan signed a two-year deal with the Montreal Alouettes (CFL).

== Personal ==
Shologan lives on a bull farm with his family in Northern Alberta near a town called Westlock during the off-season and he enjoys playing squash in his spare time. His two younger sisters died in 2001, when Shologan was 15.
