= Brian Bratton =

American gridiron football player and coach (born 1982)

Stanford Cardinal
- Title: Wide receivers coach

Personal information
- Born: July 31, 1982 (age 44); Wheeling, West Virginia, U.S.
- Listed height: 5 ft 10 in (1.78 m)
- Listed weight: 185 lb (84 kg)

Career information
- Position: Wide receiver (No. 85)
- High school: Lakeside
- College: Furman

Career history

Playing
- 2005: Atlanta Falcons*
- 2005: Baltimore Ravens*
- 2006: Cologne Centurions
- 2007–2012: Montreal Alouettes
- * Offseason or practice squad member only

Coaching
- 2013–2014: North Greenville (WR)
- 2015–2016: Furman (WR)
- 2017–2020: Furman (STC/WR)
- 2021: Furman (PGC/WR)
- 2022: Furman (Co-OC/WR)
- 2022–2025: Indianapolis Colts (OQC)
- 2026–present: Stanford (WR)

Awards and highlights
- 2× Grey Cup champion (2009, 2010); Tom Pate Memorial Award (2012)
- Stats at CFL.ca (archive)

Brian Bratton (born July 31, 1982) is an American former Canadian football wide receiver who is currently the wide receivers coach at Stanford. He most recently played for the Montreal Alouettes of the Canadian Football League (CFL). Having played with the Alouettes since 2007, he is a two-time Grey Cup champion, after winning in 2009 and 2010. He played college football for the Furman Paladins from 2002 to 2005.

== Professional career ==
=== Atlanta Falcons ===
Bratton signed his first professional contract with the Atlanta Falcons of the National Football League in May 2005 and attended the team's training camp. He was later released in September of that year.

=== Baltimore Ravens ===
Following his release from Atlanta, Bratton signed with the Baltimore Ravens in October 2005 and spent time on the team's practice roster.

=== Cologne Centurions ===
After the 2005 season, Bratton was allocated to NFL Europe's Cologne Centurions in January 2006. While playing for Cologne, he started 10 games and caught 23 passes for 280 yards and two touchdowns. He was released in August, thereby terminating his contract with the Centurions.

=== Montreal Alouettes ===
Bratton signed with the Montreal Alouettes of the Canadian Football League on February 27, 2007, to a one-year plus an option contract. In his first season, he mainly played on special teams, returning punts and kickoffs. He recorded his first career touchdown on July 26, 2007, against the Toronto Argonauts on a 79-yard punt return. He achieved a career-high in touchdowns scored in the 2008 season when he scored seven receiving touchdowns.

He played in both of Montreal's Grey Cup victories in 2009 and 2010. In 2011, he recorded a career-high in receiving yards with 675 yards to go along with five touchdowns, including the 20th scored of his career that year. At the end of the 2012 Eastern Final against the Toronto Argonauts, Bratton missed an attempt to catch a deflected ball which would have been the game-tying touchdown with only 39 seconds left on third town. The Alouettes lost possession of the football and the Argonauts went on to win the 100th Grey Cup. Two weeks before entering free agency, Bratton was released on February 1, 2013, so that he could pursue offers from other teams.

In 2012, he won the Tom Pate Memorial Award for outstanding sportsmanship and because he had made a significant contribution to his team, his community and Association.

== Statistics ==
| Receiving | | Regular season | | | | | | Postseason |
| Year | Team | Games | No. | Yards | Avg | Long | TD | Games | No. | Yards | Avg | Long | TD |
|---|---|---|---|---|---|---|---|---|---|---|---|---|---|
| 2007 | MTL | 12 | 20 | 199 | 10.0 | 17 | 0 | Did not dress |
| 2008 | MTL | 18 | 54 | 641 | 11.9 | 75 | 7 | 2 | 6 | 60 | 10.0 | 19 | 0 |
| 2009 | MTL | 18 | 58 | 613 | 10.6 | 47 | 2 | 2 | 4 | 98 | 24.5 | 45 | 2 |
| 2010 | MTL | 17 | 48 | 530 | 11.0 | 48 | 5 | 2 | 3 | 24 | 8.0 | 9 | 0 |
| 2011 | MTL | 18 | 55 | 675 | 12.3 | 46 | 5 | 1 | 5 | 83 | 16.6 | 48 | 0 |
| 2012 | MTL | 13 | 28 | 469 | 16.8 | 69 | 4 | 1 | 2 | 35 | 17.5 | 22 | 0 |
| CFL totals | | 96 | 263 | 3,127 | 11.9 | 75 | 23 | 8 | 20 | 300 | 15.0 | 48 | 2 |

| Punt returns | | Regular season | | | | | | Postseason |
| Year | Team | Games | No. | Yards | Avg | Long | TD | Games | No. | Yards | Avg | Long | TD |
|---|---|---|---|---|---|---|---|---|---|---|---|---|---|
| 2007 | MTL | 12 | 52 | 511 | 9.8 | 79 | 1 | Did not dress |
| 2008 | MTL | 18 | 4 | 34 | 8.5 | 26 | 0 | 2 | 2 | 24 | 12.0 | 17 | 0 |
| 2009 | MTL | 18 | 3 | 20 | 6.7 | | 0 | 2 | 1 | -7 | -7.0 | -7 | 0 |
| 2010 | MTL | 17 | 8 | 54 | 6.8 | | 0 | 2 | 0 | 0 | 0.0 | 0 | 0 |
| 2011 | MTL | 18 | 0 | 0 | 0.0 | 0 | 0 | 1 | 0 | 0 | 0.0 | 0 | 0 |
| 2012 | MTL | 13 | 0 | 0 | 0.0 | 0 | 0 | 1 | 0 | 0 | 0.0 | 0 | 0 |
| CFL totals | | 96 | 67 | 619 | 9.2 | 79 | 1 | 8 | 3 | 17 | 5.7 | 17 | 0 |

| Kickoff returns | | Regular season | | | | | | Postseason |
| Year | Team | Games | No. | Yards | Avg | Long | TD | Games | No. | Yards | Avg | Long | TD |
|---|---|---|---|---|---|---|---|---|---|---|---|---|---|
| 2007 | MTL | 12 | 19 | 438 | 23.1 | 35 | 0 | Did not dress |
| 2008 | MTL | 18 | 14 | 261 | 18.6 | 39 | 0 | 2 | 2 | 48 | 24.0 | 27 | 0 |
| 2009 | MTL | 18 | 10 | 155 | 15.5 | 28 | 0 | 2 | 3 | 82 | 27.3 | 56 | 0 |
| 2010 | MTL | 17 | 8 | 142 | 17.8 | 31 | 0 | 2 | 0 | 0 | 0.0 | 0 | 0 |
| 2011 | MTL | 18 | 1 | 10 | 10.0 | 10 | 0 | 1 | 0 | 0 | 0.0 | 0 | 0 |
| 2012 | MTL | 13 | 1 | 12 | 12.0 | 12 | 0 | 1 | 0 | 0 | 0.0 | 0 | 0 |
| CFL totals | | 96 | 53 | 1018 | 19.2 | 39 | 0 | 8 | 5 | 130 | 26.0 | 56 | 0 |
