= Andrew Woodruff =

Canadian football player (born 1985)

No. 60
- Position: Guard

Personal information
- Born: May 7, 1985 (age 41); Victoria, British Columbia, Canada
- Listed height: 6 ft 3 in (1.91 m)
- Listed weight: 300 lb (136 kg)

Career information
- College: Boise State University
- CFL draft: 2008: 2nd round, 12th overall pick

Career history
- 2009–2013: Montreal Alouettes

Awards and highlights
- 2× Grey Cup champion (2009, 2010)
- Stats at CFL.ca

Andrew Woodruff (born May 7, 1985) is a Canadian former professional football guard who played for the Montreal Alouettes of the Canadian Football League (CFL). He was selected by the Alouettes in the second of the 2008 CFL draft. He played college football for the Boise State Broncos.

After being drafted, he held out for over a year until April 17, 2009. Woodruff won Grey Cups in 2009 and 2010 with the Alouettes. He announced his retirement on December 18, 2013.
