= Stadnik =

Stadnik (Ukrainian: Стаднік) is a gender-neutral Slavic surname that may refer to

- Andriy Stadnik (born 1982), Ukrainian wrestler
- Hanna Stadnik (1929–2020), Polish activist
- Mariya Stadnik (born 1988), Ukrainian-Azerbaijani wrestler, wife of Andriy
- Victoria Stadnik (born 1979), Ukrainian rhythmic gymnast

== See also ==
- Stadnyk
