= Prechae Rodriguez =

American gridiron football player (born 1985)

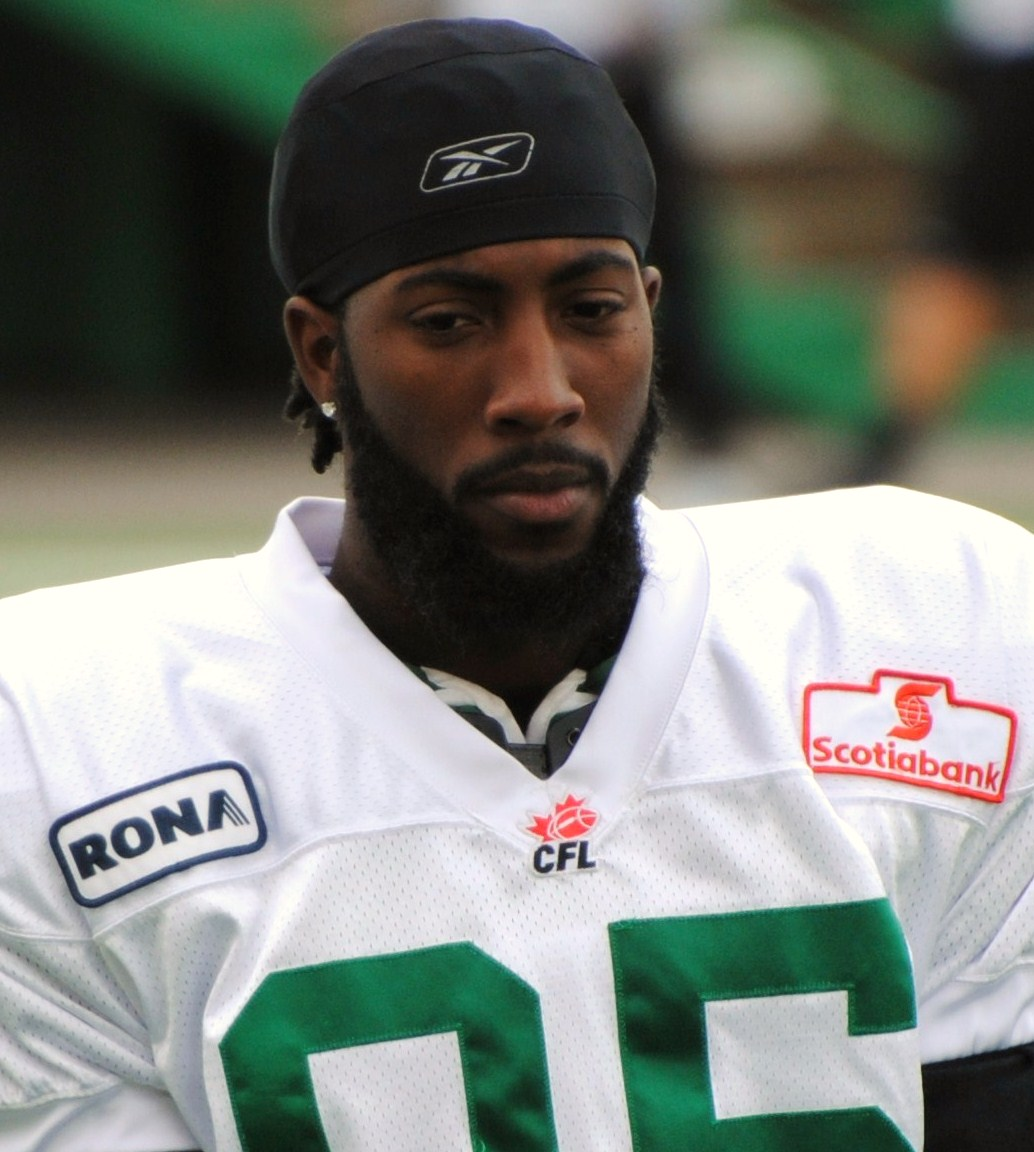
- Rodriguez in 2010

No. 15
- Position: Wide receiver

Personal information
- Born: January 21, 1985 (age 41); Tampa, Florida, U.S.
- Listed height: 6 ft 5 in (1.96 m)
- Listed weight: 215 lb (98 kg)

Career information
- High school: Thomas Jefferson (Tampa, Florida)
- College: Auburn
- NFL draft: 2008: undrafted

Career history
- New York Jets (2008)*; Hamilton Tiger-Cats (2008–2009); Saskatchewan Roughriders (2010); Montreal Alouettes (2011); Edmonton Eskimos (2011); Toronto Argonauts (2011); Tampa Bay Storm (2012); Orlando Predators (2013); Pittsburgh Power (2014); Chicago Bears (2014); Jacksonville Sharks (2015); Philadelphia Soul (2016)*; Jacksonville Sharks (2016); Tampa Bay Storm (2016)
- * Offseason or practice squad member only

Awards and highlights
- Second-team All-KJCCC (2004); CFL East Division Most Outstanding Rookie (2008); AFL East All-Star (2013)

Career CFL statistics as of 2011
- Receptions: 158
- Yards: 2,098
- Touchdowns: 12
- Stats at CFL.ca (archived)

Career AFL statistics
- Receptions: 387
- Receiving yards: 4,925
- Receiving TDs: 116
- Stats at ArenaFan.com

Prechae Rodriguez (born January 21, 1985) is an American former professional football wide receiver. He signed with Hamilton Tiger-Cats of the Canadian Football League (CFL) as an undrafted free agent in 2008. During his rookie 2008 season, Rodriguez accumulated 1099 yards in only 14 games, en route to being named the East Division Most Outstanding Rookie. He played college football for the Auburn Tigers.

== Early life ==
Rodriguez was born to Sonja Milian-Rodriguez and Andrei Rodriguez, his brother is Marcelino Rodriguez. At Jefferson High School he played both basketball and football. The Rodriguez brothers are regarded as some of Tampa's best streetball players. In 2003 Prechae Rodriguez' skills nearly earned him national recognition when he participated in the open run of the AND-1 Mix Tape Tour at the University of South Florida (USF) SunDome in Tampa, Florida where Rodriguez instantly became a fan favorite of the more than 500 fans. He initially received a spot on the AND-1 team by winning the slam dunk competition, but Rodriguez did not join the team because he was unsure how it would affect his NCAA eligibility. Rodriguez went on to sign a full football scholarship with Coffeyville Community College.

== College career ==
=== Coffeyville ===
Upon graduation from Thomas Jefferson, Rodriguez attended Coffeyville Community College. As a freshman in 2003, he redshirted, and in 2004 he hauled in 39 cataches for 553 yards and two touchdowns, returned 11 kicks for 236 yards. He was named Second-Team All-Kansas Jayhawk Community College Conference, J.C Grid Wire honorable mention, SuperPrep Junco 100, and CollegeFootballNews.com's Top JUCO Wide Receivers.

College recruiting
Name	Hometown	School	Height	Weight	40^{‡}	Commit date
Prechae Rodriguez; WR	Tampa, Florida	Coffeyville C.C.	6 ft 4 in (1.93 m)	192 lb (87 kg)	4.45	Nov 14, 2004
Prechae Rodriguez; WR	Recruit ratings: Scout: Rivals:					
Overall recruit ranking: Scout: JC (WR) Rivals: -- (WR), -- (KS)
‡ Refers to 40-yard dash; Note: In many cases, Scout, Rivals, 247Sports, On3, and ESPN may conflict in their listings of height, weight and 40 time.; In these cases, the average was taken. ESPN grades are on a 100-point scale.; Sources: "Auburn Football Commitment List". Rivals.; "Auburn College Football Recruiting Commits". Scout.; "Scout.com Team Recruiting Rankings". Scout.; "2005 Team Ranking". Rivals.com.

Rodriguez committed to Auburn on November 14, 2004. Rodriguez is among several current AFL players ranked in "Top 100" that were highly recruited players coming out of high school and junior college. Rodriguez accepted his FBS scholarship from Auburn.

=== Auburn ===
In 2005, Rodriguez enrolled at Auburn University where he majored in Sociology. As a member of the Auburn Tigers football team, he saw action in 11 games, catching 13 passes for 240 yards and one touchdown. His first catch as a Tiger came against Ball State and he finished the game with three catches for 39 yards. For the second straight game he posted a team high with 79 yards against Kentucky, one of the three catches against the Wildcats was a team season-high 41-yard touchdown in the second quarter, rushed for a 5-yard reverse touchdown early in the fourth quarter in that same game against the Wildcats. After recording one catch for 18 yards in the South Carolina game he surpassed the 100 yard mark in the 2005 season. In 2006 Rodriguez caught 14 passes for 168 yards and a touchdown. Posted an 18-yard reception against Nebraska in the Cotton Bowl. During the 2006 Iron Bowl Game against Alabama, he caught a 22-yard touchdown pass from quarterback Brandon Cox in the third quarter that served as the game-winner for the Auburn Tigers.

== Professional career ==
=== Pre-draft ===
Prior to the 2008 NFL draft, Rodriguez was projected to be undrafted by NFLDraftScout.com. He was rated as the 129th-best wide receiver in the draft. He was not invited to the NFL Scouting Combine, he posted the following numbers during his Auburn pro-day workouts:

Pre-draft measurables
Height	Weight	40-yard dash	10-yard split	20-yard split	20-yard shuttle	Three-cone drill	Vertical jump	Bench press
6 ft 4 in (1.93 m)	207 lb (94 kg)	4.64 s	1.60 s	2.71 s	4.44 s	7.16 s	35 in (0.89 m)	8 reps
All values from 2008 Auburn Pro Day

=== Hamilton Tiger-Cats ===
Rodriguez went undrafted in the 2008 NFL draft and attended tryout camps for the Tampa Bay Buccaneers, Hamilton Tiger-Cats and New York Jets. He signed with the New York Jets and was later released. On May 7, 2008, he signed with the Hamilton Tiger-Cats of the Canadian Football League and was expected to play a big role. He saw action in 14 games out of an 18-game season in 2008. Against the Edmonton Eskimos on July 26, Richie Williams threw a pass to Rodriguez for 46 yards which helped Jesse Lumsden score a touchdown on the next play. On September 13, once again against the Eskimos, Rodriguez caught two touchdown passes from quarterback Casey Printers including an 18-yard catch that ended a 97-yard possession. The week after the Edmonton game, the Tiger-Cats faced the Winnipeg Blue Bombers in the "Hall of Fame Game" in which Rodriguez caught a touchdown. In a late season game against the first place Montreal Alouettes, Rodriguez recorded 12 catches for a total of 198 yards with three touchdowns. His performance helped first time head coach Marcel Bellefeuille with his first win. In the Tiger-Cats final home game of 2008 on October 24, Rodriguez had 61 yards making him 31 yards from the 1,000 yard mark. Before the final game of the season, Rodriguez emerged as one of the CFL's most explosive offensive threats and was recognized as the Hamilton Tiger-Cats "Most Outstanding Rookie" and went on to be nominated the CFL Rookie of the Year, with Weston Dressler of the Saskatchewan Roughriders being his main competition. Although Dressler ended up winning, Rodriguez received the finest players CFL 2008 East Division Rookie of the Year Award, Frank M. Gibson Trophy. Rodriguez ended the 2008 season with 70 catches, 1,099 yards and seven touchdowns. In 2009 Rodriguez was on his way to another 1000 yard season when he was slowed by a bone bruise in a knee, he caught 45 passes for 495 yards with three touchdowns over 12 games. Rodriguez was among the CFL most dangerous wideouts during his time with the Tiger-Cats. His outstanding size and leaping ability made him a great target for quarterbacks.

=== Saskatchewan Roughriders ===
On February 24, 2010, Rodriguez was traded to the Saskatchewan Roughriders for non-import Canadian Adam Nicolson, a third round selection in the 2011 CFL draft, and the rights to a negotiation list player. In the 2009 season the Roughriders' already had a solid talented receiving corps before Rodriguez emerged in the 2010 season. The production of import wide receivers in 2009 combined for 60 catches for 703 yards and three touchdowns. That production may have been limited because Saskatchewan's offence was built around its slotbacks. He saw action in 10 games in the 2010 season and recorded 30 receptions for 376 yards and two touchdowns. The limited production no doubt affected his game. The Roughriders decided that Rodriguez wasn't in their plans going forward and released him on September 14, 2010. See video highlights of Rodriguez' 2010 Roughriders season.

=== Montreal Alouettes ===
On January 10, 2011, Rodriguez signed with the Montreal Alouettes but was released on July 27 after appearing in one game.

=== Edmonton Eskimos ===
On August 15, 2011, Rodriguez was signed by the Edmonton Eskimos after slotback Fred Stamps went down with an abdominal injury. On September 12, 2011, he was released by the Eskimos.

=== Toronto Argonauts ===
On September 12, 2011, it was announced that Rodriguez would be joining the practice roster of the Toronto Argonauts. After playing in two games and only recording five receptions for 30 yards, he was released by the Argonauts on October 11, 2011.

=== Tampa Bay Storm ===
External videos
- Video highlights of Rodriguez's 2012 season on YouTube

On November 11, 2012, the Tampa native signed with the Tampa Bay Storm of the Arena Football League. Rodriguez had never played arena football until signing with the Storm, and was a breakout star for the Storm in 2012. In the first three games of his rookie season, Rodriguez recorded 34 receptions for 451 yards and nine touchdowns leading the league in both receptions per game and receiving yards per game. On March 16, 2012, the Tampa Bay Storm accomplished something that had never been done before in the history of the Arena Football League, when they won their 200th game in franchise history with a 50-47 victory over the Georgia Force, led by Rodriguez, who was named the Offensive Player of the Game and the game's MVP. By midseason, Rodriguez had recorded 72 receptions, 967 yards, 24 TDs and was on his way to break a pair of Storm single-season receiving records through nine games and on pace to shatter the franchise record for receptions in a year, set at 125 by Huey Whittaker and Amarri Jackson in 2011. Throughout the 2012 season, the AFL spotlights players who not only contributed on the field, but made an effort to go above and beyond to make a difference in the community, Rodriguez was recognized for his teamwork and philanthropic efforts in the community with honors that included the Russell Athletic Offensive Player of the Game, AFL Play Maker of the Game, Spalding Highlight of the Game, National Guard Community MVP, and Cutters Catch of the Game. At the end of the 2012 season, Rodriguez had 32 touchdowns and tied the single-season franchise record for receptions (125) and set the single-season franchise rookie record for receiving yards (1,653).

=== Orlando Predators ===
Rodriguez set the Orlando Predators single-season franchise record with 41 touchdowns. In his performance against Tampa Bay in Week 12, Rodriguez had his best game of the season, helping beat his former team for 157 yards and 5 touchdowns, and he also tied a career-high with 12 receptions in the contest. At the end of the 2013 season, Rodriguez caught 119 passes for 1,614 yards and 41 touchdowns. He was selected to play in the AFL All-Star Exhibition Games in Honolulu, Hawaii and Beijing, China.

=== Pittsburgh Power ===
On February 6, 2014, Rodriguez was traded to the Pittsburgh Power in exchange for Markell Carter and Ben Ossai.

Rodriguez missed 8 games due to a high ankle sprain but nonetheless finished the regular season with 85 receptions for 1,138 yards and 32 touchdowns. The Power folded in November 2014.

=== Jacksonville Sharks ===
On April 9, 2015, Rodriguez was assigned to the Jacksonville Sharks.

=== Philadelphia Soul ===
On December 11, 2015, Rodriguez was traded to the Philadelphia Soul for future considerations. On March 25, 2016, Rodriguez was placed on reassignment.

=== Jacksonville Sharks ===
On April 28, 2016, Rodriguez was assigned to the Jacksonville Sharks. On May 20, 2016, Rodriguez was placed on reassignment.

=== Tampa Bay Storm ===
On June 22, 2016, Rodriguez was assigned to the Storm.

== Statistics ==
Receiving		Regular season						Playoffs
Year	Team	Games	No.	Yards	Avg	Long	TD	Games	No.	Yards	Avg	Long	TD
2008	HAM	14	70	1,099	15.7	86	7	Team did not qualify
2009	HAM	12	45	495	11.0	38	3	Placed on injured reserve
2010	SSK	10	30	376	12.5	43	2	Released
2011	MTL	1	0	0	0.0	0	0
2011	EDM	3	8	98	12.3	49	0
2011	TOR	2	5	30	6.0	17	0
CFL totals		42	158	2,098	11.5	86	12
2012	TB	16	125	1,653	13.2	48	32
2013	ORL	17	119	1,614	13.6	48	41	1	1	45	45.0	45	1
AFL totals		33	244	3,267	13.4	48	73	1	1	45	45.0	45	1

== Legal issues ==
On February 21, 2024, Rodriguez was arrested and charged with one count of child abuse after he was accused of punching a non-verbal student at the Eisenhower Exceptional Center in Gibsonton, Florida.
