= Paul Woldu =

Canadian football player (born 1984)

No. 12
- Position: Cornerback

Personal information
- Born: September 14, 1984 (age 42); Regina, Saskatchewan, Canada
- Listed height: 6 ft 0 in (1.83 m)
- Listed weight: 170 lb (77 kg)

Career information
- University: Saskatchewan
- CFL draft: 2008: 5th round, 36th overall pick

Career history
- 2006: Saskatchewan Roughriders*
- 2008–2011: Montreal Alouettes
- 2012–2015: Saskatchewan Roughriders
- * Offseason or practice squad member only

Awards and highlights
- 3× Grey Cup champion (2009, 2010, 2013)
- Stats at CFL.ca

Paul Woldu (born September 14, 1984) is a Canadian former professional football cornerback. He was drafted by the Montreal Alouettes in the fifth round of the 2008 CFL draft where he spent four years with the team. He played CIS football for the Saskatchewan Huskies football team.

== Early life ==
Woldu was born in Regina, Saskatchewan, and attended Dr. Martin LeBoldus High School. He played junior football with the Regina Thunder and earned an invitation as a non-roster player to the Saskatchewan Roughriders 2006 training camp, where he participated in a pre-season game before being released.

Upon his release from the Riders, Woldu played CIS football for the Saskatchewan Huskies for the 2006 and 2007 seasons, assisting them to the 2006 Hardy Cup and Mitchell Bowl championships and where he was named to the 2007 All-Canadian first-team. Woldu has won 3 Grey Cups in his career, two with the Montreal Alouettes in 2009 and 2010, and one with the Saskatchewan Roughriders in 2013.
