= Jonathan Hood =

Canadian football player (born 1985)

No. 25
- Position: Defensive back

Personal information
- Born: December 23, 1985 (age 40); Mississauga, Ontario
- Listed height: 6 ft 0 in (1.83 m)
- Listed weight: 195 lb (88 kg)

Career information
- College: St. Francis Xavier; Western Ontario
- CFL draft: 2008: 4th round, 26th overall pick

Career history
- 2008: Edmonton Eskimos*
- 2010–2012: Hamilton Tiger-Cats
- 2013–2014: Toronto Argonauts
- * Offseason or practice squad member only
- Stats at CFL.ca (archive)

Jonathan Hood (born December 23, 1985) is a Canadian former professional football defensive back who played in the Canadian Football League (CFL).

== Amateur football ==
Hood played high school football in Mississauga for the Father Michael Goetz Gators, and played college football for the St. Francis Xavier X-Men and the Western Ontario Mustangs.

== Professional football ==
=== Edmonton Eskimos ===
Hood was drafted 26th overall by the Edmonton Eskimos in the 2008 CFL draft, but failed to stick with the team after spending seven weeks on the practice roster.

=== Hamilton Tiger-Cats ===
Hood was signed by the Hamilton Tiger-Cats on May 28, 2010.

=== Toronto Argonauts ===
On March 20, 2013, Hood signed with the Toronto Argonauts.

== Post-football career ==
As of 2017, Hood is teaching at the University of Guelph-Humber and also pursuing a Phd from the University of Western Ontario.
