= Michael Giffin =

Canadian football player (born 1984)

No. 21
- Position: Running back

Personal information
- Born: January 24, 1984 (age 42); Kingston, Ontario, Canada
- Listed height: 6 ft 0 in (1.83 m)
- Listed weight: 220 lb (100 kg)

Career information
- University: Queen's
- CFL draft: 2008: 3rdth round, 17thth overall pick

Career history
- 2009–2011: Montreal Alouettes

Awards and highlights
- 2× Grey Cup champion (2009, 2010)
- Stats at CFL.ca

Michael Giffin (born January 24, 1984) is a Canadian former professional football running back who played for the Montreal Alouettes of the Canadian Football League. He was signed as a free agent by the Alouettes, originally late in 2008. He played his CIS football for the Queen's Golden Gaels. While at Queen's University, he was chosen a first-team All-Canadian in 2007 and 2008, He was a runner-up for the Hec Crighton Trophy as the top football player in the country. He became the first Queen's player to rush for more than 1,000 yards in a single season in school history. Giffin finished his Queen's career as the school's all-time leading rusher.

On May 10, 2012, Giffin announced his retirement.
