= Ronald Hilaire =

Canadian gridiron football player and coach (born 1984)

Carleton Ravens
- Title: Defensive coordinator

Personal information
- Born: November 22, 1984 (age 41); Laval, Quebec, Canada
- Listed height: 6 ft 1 in (1.85 m)
- Listed weight: 298 lb (135 kg)

Career information
- Position: Defensive lineman
- College: Buffalo
- CFL draft: 2008: 4th round, 27th overall pick

Career history

Playing
- 2009: Calgary Stampeders*
- * Offseason or practice squad member only

Coaching
- 2011–2013: Montreal Carabins (DC/DL/RC)
- 2014: McGill Redmen (DC/DL)
- 2015–2023: McGill Redmen/Redbirds
- 2025–present: Carleton Ravens (DC)

Ronald Hilaire (born November 22, 1984) is a Canadian football coach who is the defensive coordinator for the Carleton Ravens of U Sports football. He has also served as the head coach for the McGill Redbirds football team.

== College career ==
Hilaire played college football for the Buffalo Bulls.

== Professional career ==
Hilaire was drafted by the Calgary Stampeders in the fourth round of the 2008 CFL draft. After completing his collegiate career, he signed with the Stampeders as a defensive lineman on May 8, 2009. He spent the 2009 season with the team.

== Coaching career ==
After spending time as an assistant coach with the Montreal Carabins and McGill Redmen, Hillaire was named the 21st head coach of the McGill football team on February 17, 2015. He compiled a conference record of 16–48 over eight years and qualified for the playoffs three times, losing each time to the Carabins. He was relieved of head coaching duties on December 1, 2023.

On April 30, 2025, it was announced that Hilaire was appointed the defensive coordinator for the Carleton Ravens.

== Head coaching record ==
Year	Team	Overall	Conference	Standing	Bowl/playoffs
McGill Redmen/Redbirds (RSEQ) (2015–2023)
2015	McGill	3–5	3–5	5th	
2016	McGill	4–5	4–4	T–3rd	L RSEQ Semifinal
2017	McGill	1–8	1–7	5th	
2018	McGill	2–7	2–6	T–3rd	L RSEQ Semifinal
2019	McGill	3–6	3–5	3rd	L RSEQ Semifinal
2020	No team—COVID-19				
2021	McGill	1–7	1–7	5th	
2022	McGill	1–7	1–7	5th	
2023	McGill	1–7	1–7	5th	
McGill:		16–52	16–48		
Total:		16–48			

== Personal life ==
Hilaire is of Haitian descent.
