= Dylan Barker =

Canadian football player (born 1986)

Profile
- Position: Defensive back

Personal information
- Born: August 21, 1986 (age 40); Moose Jaw, Saskatchewan, Canada
- Listed height: 6 ft 4 in (1.93 m)
- Listed weight: 230 lb (104 kg)

Career information
- College: Saskatchewan
- CFL draft: 2008: 1st round, 1st overall pick

Career history
- 2008–2011: Hamilton Tiger-Cats

Awards and highlights
- 2004 All-Canadian; 2006 All-Canadian, Canada West Outstanding Student-Athlete, played in East West Bowl; 2007 All-Canadian, played in East-West Shrine Game
- Stats at CFL.ca (archive)

Dylan Barker (born August 21, 1986) is a Canadian former professional football player who played four seasons for the Hamilton Tiger-Cats. He was the first overall pick in the 2008 CFL draft. He currently holds the CFL All-time record for most special team tackles in a season. He was forced to retire due to a lower back injury. He now works in the dentistry industry.
