= Jeff Zelinski =

Canadian football player (born 1982)

Profile
- Position: Defensive back

Personal information
- Born: September 16, 1982 (age 44); Mission, British Columbia, Canada
- Listed height: 6 ft 4 in (1.93 m)
- Listed weight: 200 lb (91 kg)

Career information
- College: Saint Mary's
- CFL draft: 2008: 5th round, 40th overall pick

Career history
- Saskatchewan Roughriders (2008)*
- * Offseason or practice squad member only
- Stats at CFL.ca (archive)

Jeff Zelinski (born September 16, 1982) is a Canadian former football defensive back. He played CIS Football at Saint Mary's, where he played cornerback. He was selected in the fifth round (40th overall) of the 2008 CFL draft by the Saskatchewan Roughriders.

Zelinski was selected a second-team CIS all-Canadian in 2007 and 2008, and was a First-team All-Canadian in 2009.
