= Too many men =

Penalty called for too many players active in a sport

Too many men is a penalty that may be called in various team sports when the team has more players on the field or other playing area than are allowed by the rules. Penalties vary from one sport to the next.

== Association football ==
In association football, if a team is found to have more than eleven players on the field, the referee must determine which is the extra player, and the player so determined is given a yellow card. In indoor soccer, if a team is found to have more than six players on the field, the extra player is given a blue card and is sent to the penalty box for two minutes.

== Australian rules football ==
In Australian rules football, the primary means for controlling interchanges in most leagues is the head count. At the request of a team captain, the umpire will instruct all players from both teams line to line-up in the centre of the ground, and the umpire will then count the players. If either team is found to have more than eighteen players on the field, anything the team had scored to that point of the current quarter of play is cancelled, and a free kick and 50 meter penalty are awarded.

Since 2008, in the top level Australian Football League, the interchange steward monitors player interchanges, and informs the emergency umpire directly if a team has more than eighteen men on the ground due to an interchange error. When an infringement is identified in this manner, a free kick and 50-metre penalty are awarded to the opposing team at the centre of the ground, but the team's score is not cancelled because infringements are usually noticed quickly, minimizing the potential influence on the game.

== Baseball ==
Baseball limits teams to nine players (one pitcher, one catcher, and seven other fielders) on the defense at any time. If the defense is found to have more than nine players on the field, the umpire must determine which is the additional player(s), and the player(s) so determined shall be ejected.

== Basketball ==
Professional and collegiate basketball (both men's and women's) limit teams to five players on the court at any one time. A team with more than five in play at once is assessed a technical foul for Too Many Players on the Court. In March 2009, the National Basketball Association rules were changed to allow for the nullification of goals scored with too many players on the court. Under no circumstance can any player or coach be ejected on a technical foul caused by too many players.

== Gridiron football ==
In gridiron football, if a team has more than the allowed number of players on the field during a play (eleven in the NFL, twelve in the CFL), the offending team is penalized five yards in the NFL and ten yards in the CFL for too many men on the field (also called twelve/thirteen men on the field). This is usually the result of an improper substitution.

A related, but more serious, penalty of illegal participation occurs if the extra man or men enter the field during the play. Illegal participation is a 15-yard penalty in high school football. If the illegal participant prevents a score, it is an unfair act and the score is awarded.

== Ice hockey ==
Too many men on the ice is a bench penalty in ice hockey called when a team has more than the legal number of players (six, including the goalie, if not already short handed) on the ice at one time. In women's leagues such as the PWHL, the infraction is officially referred to as too many women on the ice or too many players on the ice. The penalty for the infraction is a bench minor of two minutes, served by a player designated by the offending team's coach from among those on the ice at the time of the infraction.

This penalty is most commonly seen during a "line change", when teams are switching players off and replacements are coming on. If either the player entering, or the player exiting, plays the puck while the other is on the ice, the penalty is called. If the incoming or outgoing player is accidentally struck by the puck, it is not an infraction. In the NHL, substitution is allowed when the outgoing player is within 5 feet (1.5 m) of their bench.

== Lacrosse ==
Similar to hockey, too many men is a minor penalty in lacrosse, and a player from the offending team is sent to the penalty box.
