= Mike Stadnyk =

Canadian football player (born 1986)

Profile
- Position: Defensive end

Personal information
- Born: August 8, 1986 (age 40); Regina, Saskatchewan
- Listed height: 6 ft 5 in (1.96 m)
- Listed weight: 244 lb (111 kg)

Career information
- College: Montana-Missoula
- CFL draft: 2008: 2nd round, 14th overall pick

Career history
- 2008–2009: Saskatchewan Roughriders
- 2010: Calgary Stampeders*
- 2010: Edmonton Eskimos*
- * Offseason or practice squad member only

Michael Stadnyk (born August 8, 1986) is a Canadian former professional football defensive end. He was a member of the Saskatchewan Roughriders, Calgary Stampeders and Edmonton Eskimos of the Canadian Football League. He was drafted by the Roughriders in the second round of the 2008 CFL draft. He played college football for Montana Grizzlies.
