= Dave Stala =

Polish gridiron football player (born 1979)

No. 88
- Position: Slotback

Personal information
- Born: October 25, 1979 (age 47); Myślenice, Poland
- Listed height: 6 ft 2 in (1.88 m)
- Listed weight: 195 lb (88 kg)

Career information
- High school: Cathedral High School
- College: Saint Mary's
- CFL draft: 2003: 6th round, 50th overall pick

Career history
- 2003–2008: Montreal Alouettes
- 2009–2013: Hamilton Tiger-Cats
- 2014: Montreal Alouettes
- 2015: Toronto Argonauts

Awards and highlights
- CFL East All-Star (2010); Lew Hayman Trophy (2010)
- Stats at CFL.ca

Dave Stala (born October 25, 1979) is a former professional Canadian football slotback who played in the Canadian Football League (CFL). He was originally drafted in the 6th round, 50th overall by the Montreal Alouettes as a placekicker in 2003. He played CIS football for the Saint Mary's Huskies. After injury-plagued seasons in 2007 and 2008, he signed with the Hamilton Tiger-Cats in 2009 and rejuvenated his career in his hometown. Stala is well known for a unique soccer-inspired touchdown celebration which he performed on July 31, 2010. After five seasons with the Tiger-Cats, Stala was released by the club on January 9, 2014. He re-signed with Montreal the next day to a two-year contract, reuniting him with the team that drafted him.

Dave Stala is often referred to by the nicknames "Sticky Stala" or just "Sticky".

== Statistics ==
Receiving		Regular season						Playoffs
Year	Team	Games	No.	Yards	Avg	Long	TD	Games	No.	Yards	Avg	Long	TD
2003	MTL	13	10	179	17.9	36	0	2	0	0	0.0	0	0
2004	MTL	9	12	171	14.3	25	0	1	1	5	5.0	5	0
2005	MTL	18	83	1037	12.5	43	5	3	6	72	12.0	30	1
2006	MTL	16	38	445	11.7	65	2	2	3	33	11.0	14	0
2007	MTL	1	2	20	10.0	12	0	Placed on injured reserve
2008	MTL	1	0	0	0.0	0	0	Placed on injured reserve
2009	HAM	18	67	751	11.2	69	2	1	4	54	13.5	28	2
2010	HAM	18	86	1023	11.9	41	6	1	2	22	11.0	11	0
2011	HAM	18	59	771	13.1	58	8	2	5	59	11.8	21	1
2012	HAM	18	42	655	15.6	87	4	Team did not qualify
2013	HAM	14	10	144	14.4	25	0	3	0	0	0.0	0	0
2014	MTL	18	10	126	12.6	27	0	2	0	0	0.0	0	0
2015	TO	18	11	110	10	15	2
CFL totals		166	429	5,424	12.7	87	29	17	21	245	11.7	30	4
