= Shea Emry =

Canadian football player (born 1986)

No. 11, 41
- Position: Linebacker

Personal information
- Born: April 23, 1986 (age 40); Richmond, British Columbia, Canada
- Listed height: 6 ft 1 in (1.85 m)
- Listed weight: 228 lb (103 kg)

Career information
- College: Eastern Washington
- University: British Columbia
- CFL draft: 2008: 1st round, 7th overall pick

Career history
- 2008–2013: Montreal Alouettes
- 2014: Toronto Argonauts
- 2015: Saskatchewan Roughriders

Awards and highlights
- 2× Grey Cup champion (2009, 2010); Lew Hayman Trophy (2012); James P. McCaffrey Trophy (2012); Jake Gaudaur Veterans' Trophy (2013); CFL All-Star (2012); CFL East All-Star (2012)
- Stats at CFL.ca

Shea Emry (born April 23, 1986) is a Canadian former professional football linebacker who played eight seasons in the Canadian Football League (CFL). He was drafted by the Montreal Alouettes in the first round of the 2008 CFL draft and would play there for six seasons before signing with the Toronto Argonauts in 2014. He played CIS Football at the University of British Columbia after playing three seasons of NCAA Football at Eastern Washington.

He is the founder and CEO of WellMen Project, a men's adventure club which aims to empower men to take initiative in their own mental wellness.

== Professional career ==
=== Montreal Alouettes ===
Emry spent 6 seasons with the Montreal Alouettes of the CFL, spanning from the 2008 CFL season through the 2013 CFL season. His best season with the Als was the 2012 season in which he was named a CFL All-Star after recording a career-high 87 tackles. He finished his time with Montreal amassing 261 tackles (average of 43.5 tackles per season), 44 special teams tackles, 13 sacks, 4 interceptions, 1 fumble recovery and 1 defensive touchdown.

=== Toronto Argonauts ===
On February 11, 2014, the first day of CFL free-agency, Emry signed a three-year contract with the Toronto Argonauts of the Canadian Football League. In his first and only season in Toronto Emry recorded 72 tackles after playing in all 18 regular season games.

=== Saskatchewan Roughriders ===
On January 24, 2015, Emry was acquired by the Saskatchewan Roughriders. Toronto received DE Ricky Foley in the trade.

Emry would go on to play one half of a game with the Roughriders, before suffering a career ending injury during the first game of the 2015 season against the Winnipeg Blue Bombers. On February 3, 2016, Emry officially announced his retirement after playing eight seasons in the CFL, mostly with the Montreal Alouettes.
