= Kerry Carter =

Trinidadian-Canadian gridiron football player (born 1980)

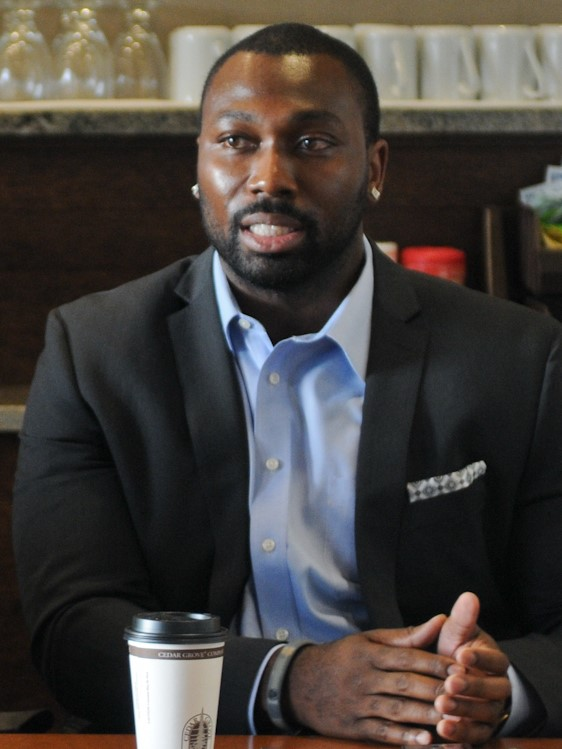
- Carter in 2012

No. 32, 8
- Position: Fullback

Personal information
- Born: December 19, 1980 (age 45); Port of Spain, Trinidad and Tobago
- Listed height: 6 ft 2 in (1.88 m)
- Listed weight: 242 lb (110 kg)

Career information
- College: Stanford
- CFL draft: 2003: 2nd round, 18th overall pick

Career history
- 2003–2004: Seattle Seahawks
- 2006: Washington Redskins
- 2007–2011: Montreal Alouettes

Awards and highlights
- 2× Grey Cup champion (2009, 2010)
- Stats at Pro Football Reference
- Stats at CFL.ca (archive)

Kerry Carter (born December 19, 1980) is a Trinidadian-Canadian former professional gridiron football fullback who played in the National Football League (NFL) and Canadian Football League (CFL). He was signed by the Seattle Seahawks as an undrafted free agent in 2003 and drafted by the Montreal Alouettes in the second round of the 2003 CFL draft. He played college football at Stanford.

Carter was also a member of the Washington Redskins in 2006. In the first preseason game of the year against the Cincinnati Bengals, Carter made a cut in the backfield and tore his ACL. He was released and given an injury settlement.

As a member of the Montreal Alouettes, he won the Canadian Football League (CFL)'s Grey Cup in the 2009 and 2010 seasons. On May 7, 2012, he was released by the Alouettes.
