= Chris Best =

Canadian football player (born 1983)

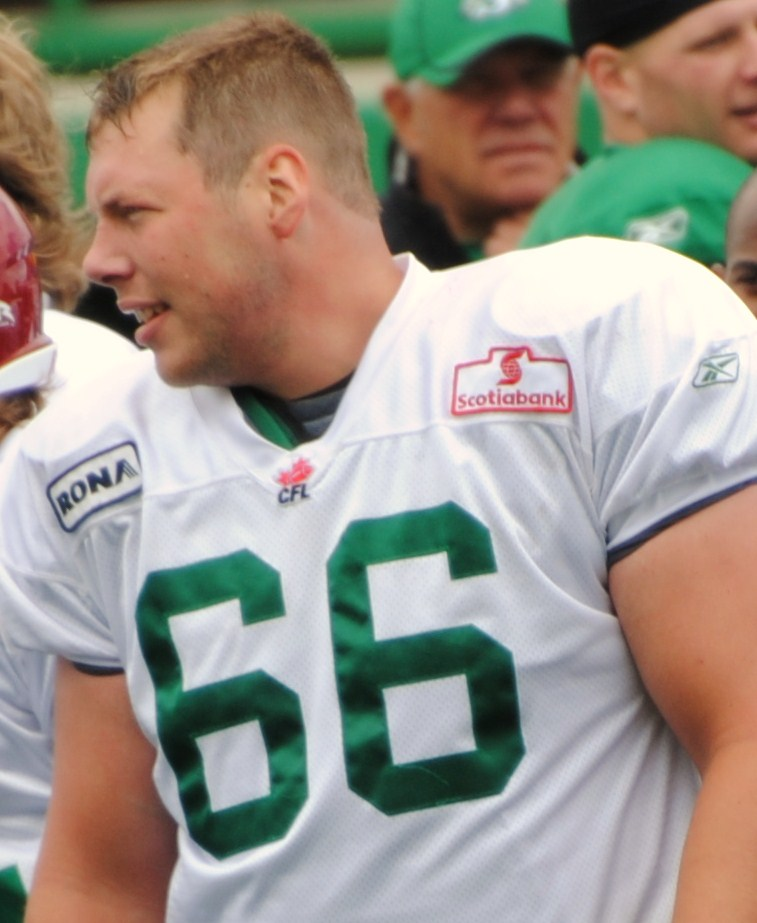
- Best with the Saskatchewan Roughriders in 2010

No. 66
- Position: Offensive guard

Personal information
- Born: April 3, 1983 (age 43); Calgary, Alberta, Canada
- Listed height: 6 ft 5 in (1.96 m)
- Listed weight: 301 lb (137 kg)

Career information
- University: Waterloo
- CFL draft: 2005: 1st round, 4th overall pick

Career history
- 2005–2016: Saskatchewan Roughriders

Awards and highlights
- Grey Cup champion (2013); J. P. Metras Trophy (2006)
- Stats at CFL.ca (archive)

Chris Best (born April 3, 1983) is a Canadian former professional football guard who played 10 seasons for the Saskatchewan Roughriders of the Canadian Football League. He played CIS Football at Waterloo, as well as playing four seasons in the United States at Duke University. He graduated from Duke University in 2005 with a degree in Mechanical Engineering.

He won the 101st Grey Cup with the Roughriders in 2013.
