= Teale Orban =

Canadian football player (born 1986)

Profile
- Position: Quarterback

Personal information
- Born: January 8, 1986 (age 40); Regina, Saskatchewan, Canada
- Listed height: 6 ft 2 in (1.88 m)
- Listed weight: 205 lb (93 kg)

Career information
- University: Regina Rams
- CFL draft: 2008: 6th round, 41st overall pick

Career history
- 2008: Saskatchewan Roughriders*
- 2009: Fairbanks Grizzlies
- 2010: Sioux City Bandits
- * Offseason or practice squad member only

Awards and highlights
- Canada West Outstanding Student-Athlete (2008, 2007); Canada West All-Star (2008, 2007, 2006); Canada West Player of the Year (2007, 2006); SaskSport Athlete of the Year (2007); University of Regina Male Athlete of the Year (2007, 2006); CIS First-Team All-Canadian (2006)
- Stats at CFL.ca

Teale Orban (born January 8, 1986) is a Canadian former football quarterback for the University of Regina Rams. He was selected in the sixth round of the 2008 CFL draft by the Saskatchewan Roughriders.

== Personal life ==
Teale Orban is the son of Rick Orban, a principal for the Regina School Board, and older brother of Taylor Orban, who played linebacker for the Rams.
