= Cory Huclack =

Canadian football player (born 1984)

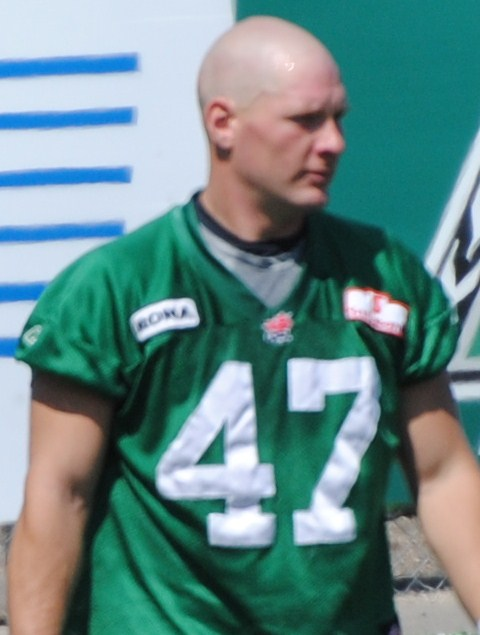
- Huclack with the Saskatchewan Roughriders in 2010

No. 51, 50
- Position: Linebacker

Personal information
- Born: February 29, 1984 (age 42); Winnipeg, Manitoba, Canada
- Listed height: 6 ft 0 in (1.83 m)
- Listed weight: 215 lb (98 kg)

Career information
- University: Manitoba
- CFL draft: 2007: undrafted

Career history
- 2007: Winnipeg Blue Bombers*
- 2007–2009: Montreal Alouettes
- 2010–2013: Saskatchewan Roughriders
- * Offseason or practice squad member only

Awards and highlights
- 2× Grey Cup champion (2009, 2013)
- Stats at CFL.ca (archive)

Cory Huclack (born February 29, 1984) is a Canadian former professional football linebacker who played for the Montreal Alouettes and Saskatchewan Roughriders of the Canadian Football League (CFL). He was signed by the Winnipeg Blue Bombers as an undrafted free agent in 2007.

Huclack played for the Manitoba Bisons from 2002-06. He finished his career in 2013 with 166 tackles (2nd all-time for Manitoba) and 10 interceptions (3rd all-time for Manitoba). He was named a Canada West All-Star in 2005 when he had 5 interceptions. In 2006, he was named a Canada West All-Star and a CIS Second Team All-Canadian. He was also nominated for the Presidents Trophy as the CIS Defensive Player of the Year in 2006.
