= Gurminder Thind =

Canadian football player (born 1984)

Profile
- Position: Guard

Personal information
- Born: January 29, 1984 (age 42); Mississauga, Ontario, Canada
- Listed height: 6 ft 3 in (1.91 m)
- Listed weight: 285 lb (129 kg)

Career information
- College: University of South Carolina
- CFL draft: 2008: 4th round, 32nd overall pick

Career history
- 2009: Montreal Alouettes*
- * Offseason or practice squad member only
- Stats at CFL.ca

Gurminder Thind (born January 29, 1984) is a Canadian former football guard for the Montreal Alouettes of the Canadian Football League. He was drafted by the Alouettes in the fourth round of the 2008 CFL draft. He played college football for the South Carolina Gamecocks.
