= Sam Giguère =

Canadian gridiron football player and bobsledder (born 1985)

Profile
- Position: Wide receiver

Personal information
- Born: July 11, 1985 (age 41); Sherbrooke, Quebec
- Listed height: 5 ft 11 in (1.80 m)
- Listed weight: 218 lb (99 kg)

Career information
- University: Sherbrooke
- CFL draft: 2008: 1st round, 8th overall pick

Career history
- Indianapolis Colts (2008–2009); New York Giants (2010–2011)*; Hamilton Tiger-Cats (2012–2014); Montreal Alouettes (2015–2017); Edmonton Eskimos (2018)
- * Offseason or practice squad member only

Awards and highlights
- 2× QSSF All-Star (2006–2007)

Career CFL statistics
- Receptions: 0
- Receiving yards: 0
- Receiving TDs: 0
- Stats at Pro Football Reference

Career CFL statistics
- Receptions: 116
- Receiving yards: 1,543
- Receiving TDs: 3
- Stats at CFL.ca

Samuel Giguère (born July 11, 1985) is a Canadian football wide receiver and bobsledder. He was drafted by the Hamilton Tiger-Cats eighth overall in the 2008 CFL draft and signed by the Indianapolis Colts of the National Football League as an undrafted free agent in 2008. He played CIS football at Sherbrooke. He has also been a member of the New York Giants (NFL) and Montreal Alouettes (CFL) and participated for the Canadian National Bobsleigh team as a brakeman.

== University career ==
He played for the Bishop's College School and then Université de Sherbrooke Vert-et-Or In 2005, he caught 30 passes for 984 yards and four touchdowns. He was also a member of the Junior Canadian Team and was one of the fastest players in the AAA Collegial Ligue. In 2006, he was the fourth-leading wide receiver with 19 receptions for 464 yards. He tied the record for most touchdown receptions (3) in a game against Acadia University. Giguère was named offensive player of the week in the QUFL, the Quebec University Football League. That year, Giguère was named to the QUFL all-star team. He was also runner-up for the Université de Sherbrooke rookie of the year award in 2005–2006. In 2007, Samuel Giguère caught 45 passes for 871 yards and seven touchdowns and was a first-team all-conference selection and a first-team All Canadian. He finished the year ranked second in yards and third in yards per game (108.9) and had all career KOR totals as a Senior

== Professional career ==
=== Hamilton Tiger-Cats ===
Giguère was drafted eighth overall in the 2008 CFL draft by the Hamilton Tiger-Cats. However, The NFL's Indianapolis Colts signed him following the 2008 NFL draft.

=== Indianapolis Colts ===
Giguère signed with the Indianapolis Colts as an undrafted free agent on May 2, 2008. He was waived on August 30 during final cuts and subsequently re-signed to the team's practice squad.

After spending the entire 2008 season on the practice squad, Giguère was re-signed to a future contract on January 5, 2009. He was once again waived during final cuts on September 5, only to be re-signed to the practice squad two days later. Giguère was promoted to the Colts' active roster on December 30, 2009, after the team waived quarterback Drew Willy.

He spent the 2010 off-season with the Colts and was waived on September 4, 2010, as part of the team's final cuts.

=== New York Giants ===
Giguère was signed to the New York Giants' practice squad on October 19. After he injured his groin in training camp in 2011 and was waived/injured, he was released with an injury settlement on August 23, 2011.

=== Hamilton Tiger-Cats ===
One day before the 2012 CFL draft, Giguère signed with the Hamilton Tiger-Cats of the Canadian Football League. The Tiger-Cats had selected Giguère with the eighth overall pick in the 2008 CFL draft. In his first season in the CFL, Giguère totalled 549 yards and one touchdown. Giguère's involvement remained about the same over the next two seasons, catching 34 passes for 474 in 2013 and 41 for 520 in 2014.

=== Montreal Alouettes ===
Upon entering free agency, Giguère signed with the Montreal Alouettes on February 12, 2015. In three seasons in Montreal, Giguère played in 47 games catching 86 passes for 915 yards with ten touchdowns. On January 19, 2018, Giguère was released.

=== Edmonton Eskimos ===
On June 26, 2018, early in the 2018 season, Giguère signed with the Edmonton Eskimos. Giguère was released on August 14, 2018, but was re-signed on August 20, 2018.

== Bobsledding ==
In January 2022, Giguère was named to Canada's 2022 Olympic team as a member of the four-man team piloted by Christopher Spring.
