= Daryl Stephenson =

Canadian football player (born 1985)

No. 30
- Position: Running back

Personal information
- Born: October 8, 1985 (age 41); London, Ontario, Canada
- Listed height: 6 ft 2 in (1.88 m)
- Listed weight: 230 lb (104 kg)

Career information
- University: Windsor
- CFL draft: 2008: 3rd round, 24th overall pick

Career history
- 2008–2010: Winnipeg Blue Bombers
- 2011–2012: Hamilton Tiger-Cats
- 2013: Saskatchewan Roughriders

Awards and highlights
- Grey Cup champion (2013); 2004 Norm Marshall Trophy; 2006 Hec Crighton Trophy; Canadian University Football All-Time Leading Rusher (5,163 rushing yards)
- Stats at CFL.ca

Daryl Stephenson (born October 8, 1985) is a Canadian former professional football running back. He was originally drafted by the Winnipeg Blue Bombers in 2008 and played with that franchise for three seasons. Stephenson then played for two seasons with the Hamilton Tiger-Cats before signing with the Saskatchewan Roughriders. He played collegiately for the University of Windsor Lancers.

== University ==
A tailback at 230 pounds with 4.7 speed in the 40-yard dash, Stephenson established himself as a leading rusher in Canadian University Football. In his very first game in the CIS and on his very first carry, Stephenson took a hand off 49 yards up the middle and scored a touchdown in the Lancers season opening 30–28 victory over Queen's. That year (2004), Stephenson rushed for 1,192 yards to establish a new CIS rookie rushing record and was named the Norm Marshall Trophy winner as the OUA Football Rookie of the Year.

In 2005, Stephenson rushed for 1,306 yards and 12 touchdowns en route to capturing his first CIS Rushing Title. In the process, he was named a first team offense member of the 2005 CIS Football All-Canadian Team and an OUA First Team All-Star.

In 2006, he was awarded the Hec Crighton Trophy as the Canadian University Football Player of the Year. Stephenson also captured his second straight CIS rushing title with 1,140 yards, helping the Lancer Football squad to a 6–2 record and a top ten ranking in Canada. He was also named the OUA Most Outstanding Player, a CIS First Team All-Canadian and an OUA First Team All-Star. He also made history as he became the first player in CIS history to rush for 1,000 yards in 3 straight seasons (2004 to 2006).

After his first four seasons, his 4,402 career rushing yards was an OUA record and placed him third all-time in Canadian University Football history.

In 2007, Stephenson played in parts of only four games due to injuries and still ranked fifth in the province and eighth in the nation with a rushing total of 764 yards. Stephenson scored a total of four touchdowns that season with the Windsor Lancers.

Stephenson topped all the running backs at the 2008 CFL Evaluation Camp with a 37-inch vertical jump.

On September 13, 2008, Stephenson became the all-time leading rusher in CIS history by surpassing Dominic Zagari of the University of Manitoba's record of 4738 yards set from 1991 to 1995. He also became the first running back in Canadian University History to rush for over 5,000 yards in a career. His final collegiate total sits at 5,163 rushing yards.

On April 1, 2009, Stephenson had his #24 jersey retired by the University of Windsor in recognition of his outstanding collegiate career.

== Professional career ==
=== Winnipeg Blue Bombers ===
Stephenson was drafted in the third round (24th overall) in the 2008 CFL draft by the Winnipeg Blue Bombers. He was released at the end of Winnipeg's training camp to play his final year of eligibility with the University of Windsor but on October 21, 2008, quickly re-signed by the Blue Bombers following Windsor's elimination from the 2008 CIS football season playoffs. He rejoined the Blue Bombers immediately and made his debut on October 26 against the Montreal Alouettes.

=== Hamilton Tiger-Cats ===
Stephenson was signed as a free agent by the Hamilton Tiger-Cats on February 17, 2011. On July 6, 2012, he scored his first professional touchdown on a nine-yard screen pass from Henry Burris against the BC Lions. He finished with his highest receiving numbers in his professional career in 2012, recording six catches for 65 yards and two touchdowns. Stephenson avoided free agency by re-signing with the Tiger-Cats on February 6, 2013, but was released following the team's first preseason game on June 17, 2013.

=== Saskatchewan Roughriders ===
Shortly after his release from the Tiger-Cats, Stephenson signed with the Saskatchewan Roughriders on June 19, 2013.

Stephenson was released by the Roughriders on April 25, 2014, after winning the 101st Grey Cup with the team.
