= Nick Setta =

American gridiron football player (born 1981)

No. 13
- Position: Placekicker / Punter

Personal information
- Born: May 6, 1981 (age 45); Lockport, Illinois, U.S.
- Listed height: 6 ft 0 in (1.83 m)
- Listed weight: 194 lb (88 kg)

Career information
- High school: Lockport (IL)
- College: Notre Dame
- NFL draft: 2004: undrafted

Career history
- Chicago Bears (2004–2005)*; Rhein Fire (2005); Buffalo Bills (2006)*; Cologne Centurions (2006); Hamilton Tiger-Cats (2006–2009); Chicago Rush (2012); Ottawa Redblacks (2014)*
- * Offseason or practice squad member only

Awards and highlights
- Frank M. Gibson Trophy (2007)

Nicholas Setta (born May 6, 1981) is a former professional Canadian football placekicker and punter. He played college football for the Notre Dame Fighting Irish.

== Early life ==
Setta attended Lockport Township High School in Lockport, Illinois. While at Lockport High, he set the Illinois high school football record for longest field goal (59 yards). He also set the school record of 6'10" in the high jump, won 2 state titles as a member of the Lockport Porters cross country team, and won a state title in the 800m long distance run.

== College career ==
Setta played four seasons (2000–03) at the University of Notre Dame where he successfully completed 46 of 66 field goal attempts, the second highest field goal total in Notre Dame football history.

He also competed for Notre Dame in track and field.

== Professional career ==
Setta was signed by the New Orleans Saints as an undrafted free-agent on May 13, 2004. He also served time with Tampa Bay, Chicago, Cleveland and Buffalo.

On December 12, 2006, he signed as a free agent with the Hamilton Tiger-Cats of the CFL. He scored a league leading 167 points in his first year in Canada. He was also named a CFL All-Star. He was one of Hamilton's captains in the 2009 season. Setta was released by the Ti-Cats on January 29, 2010.

On January 6, 2014, Setta signed with the Ottawa Redblacks, becoming the first kicker in the franchise's history.

== Records ==
- longest punt in Hamilton Tiger-Cats history (97 yards, two times, 2008, 2009)
- highest career average yards per kickoff in Hamilton Tiger-Cats history (60.2)
- highest single game punting average in CFL history (64.7 yards)
