= 2008 CFL draft =

Canadian football draft

General information
- Sport: Football
- Date: April 30
- Time: 12:00 PM EST
- Location: Toronto
- Network: TSN.ca

Overview
- 48 total selections
- First selection: Dylan Barker
- Most selections: Toronto Argonauts (7); BC Lions (7)
- Fewest selections: Hamilton Tiger-Cats (4)

The 2008 CFL draft took place on Wednesday, April 30, 2008, live at 12:00 PM ET on TSN.ca. A total of 48 players were chosen from among 752 eligible players from Canadian Universities across the country, as well as Canadian players playing in the NCAA. Of the 48 draft selections, 33 players were drafted from Canadian Interuniversity Sport institutions.

The first two rounds were broadcast on TSN.ca with host Rod Black. CFL Commissioner Mark Cohon was in the studio to announce each selection. The CFL on TSN panel included Duane Forde, Greg Marshall, Brian Towriss, Farhan Lalji, Jock Climie, Matt Dunigan, and Chris Schultz who analyzed the teams' needs and picks.

The Hamilton Tiger-Cats, with the league-worst 3–15 record in the 2007 CFL season had several offers for their first-overall selection but kept their pick and chose Saskatchewan Huskies safety Dylan Barker. Barker, a native of Moose Jaw, Saskatchewan is a two-time Canadian Interuniversity Sport first-team all-Canadian. He led the Huskies with 53 tackles, three interceptions, and four breakups last season. It is expected that he will be able to help the Tiger-Cats in the 2008 CFL season.

== Forfeitures ==
- Montreal forfeited their first round selection after a CFL investigation found that they had exceeded the league salary cap by $108,285 (the minimum for a forfeiture is $100,000). That draft pick (originally the fourth overall) reverted to the Hamilton Tiger-Cats at the end of the first round as they were first in the order of waiver priority after finishing last in the 2007 standings.

== Draft order ==
| = CFL Division All-Star | = CFL All-Star | = Hall of Famer |

=== Round one ===
| Pick # | CFL team | Player | Position | School |
|---|---|---|---|---|
| 1 | Hamilton Tiger-Cats | Dylan Barker | DB | Saskatchewan |
| 2 | Calgary Stampeders (via Edmonton Eskimos) | Dimitri Tsoumpas | OL | Weber State |
| 3 | Calgary Stampeders | Jesse Newman | OL | Louisiana-Lafayette |
| 4 | Saskatchewan Roughriders (via Toronto Argonauts) | Keith Shologan | DL | Central Florida |
| 5 | BC Lions | Justin Sorensen | OL | South Carolina |
| 6 | Winnipeg Blue Bombers | Brendon LaBatte | OL | Regina |
| 7 | Montreal Alouettes (via Saskatchewan) | Shea Emry | LB | UBC |
| 8 | Hamilton Tiger-Cats (via Montreal forfeiture) | Samuel Giguère | WR | Sherbrooke |

=== Round two ===
| Pick # | CFL team | Player | Position | School |
|---|---|---|---|---|
| 9 | BC Lions (via Hamilton) | Rolly Lumbala | RB | Idaho |
| 10 | Saskatchewan Roughriders (via Edmonton via Toronto via Edmonton) | Jonathan St. Pierre | OL | Illinois State |
| 11 | Edmonton Eskimos (via Calgary) | Greg Wojt | OL | Central Michigan |
| 12 | Montreal Alouettes | Andrew Woodruff | OL | Boise State |
| 13 | Toronto Argonauts | Mike Bradwell | WR | McMaster |
| 14 | Saskatchewan Roughriders (via BC) | Mike Stadnyk | DE | Montana |
| 15 | Winnipeg Blue Bombers | Aaron Hargreaves | WR | Simon Fraser |
| 16 | Calgary Stampeders (via Edmonton via Saskatchewan) | Fernand Kashama | DE | Western Michigan |

=== Round three ===
| Pick # | CFL team | Player | Position | School |
|---|---|---|---|---|
| 17 | Hamilton Tiger-Cats | Michael Giffin | RB/FB | Queen's |
| 18 | BC Lions (via Edmonton) | Justin Shaw | DL | Manitoba |
| 19 | Edmonton Eskimos (via Calgary) | Tim St. Pierre | LB | Saint Mary's |
| 20 | BC Lions (via Saskatchewan via Montreal) | Jason Arakgi | LB | McMaster |
| 21 | Toronto Argonauts | Jean-Nicolas Carrière | LB | McGill |
| 22 | BC Lions | Mike McEachern | DB | Western Illinois |
| 23 | Edmonton Eskimos (via BC Lions via Winnipeg) | Justin Cooper | DL | Manitoba |
| 24 | Winnipeg Blue Bombers (via Edmonton via Saskatchewan) | Daryl Stephenson | RB | Windsor |

=== Round four ===
| Pick # | CFL team | Player | Position | School |
|---|---|---|---|---|
| 25 | Edmonton Eskimos (via Hamilton) | Sammy Okpro | DB | Concordia |
| 26 | Edmonton Eskimos | Jonathan Hood | DB | St.FX |
| 27 | Calgary Stampeders | Ronald Hilaire | DL | Buffalo |
| 28 | Montreal Alouettes | Terence Firr | REC | Manitoba |
| 29 | Toronto Argonauts | Delroy Clarke | DB | Ottawa |
| 30 | Saskatchewan (via BC) | Jean-François Morin-Roberge | OL | Montréal |
| 31 | Winnipeg Blue Bombers | Marc Beswick | DB | Saint Mary's |
| 32 | Montreal Alouettes (via Saskatchewan) | Gurminder Thind | OL | South Carolina |

=== Round five ===
| Pick # | CFL team | Player | Position | School |
|---|---|---|---|---|
| 33 | Hamilton Tiger-Cats | Laurent Lavigne Masse | REC | Laval |
| 34 | Edmonton Eskimos | Dante Luciani | REC | Laurier |
| 35 | Calgary Stampeders | Jon Gott | OL | Boise State |
| 36 | Montreal Alouettes | Paul Woldu | DB | Saskatchewan |
| 37 | Toronto Argonauts | Richard Zulys | OL | Western |
| 38 | BC Lions | Brady Browne | DB | Manitoba |
| 39 | Winnipeg Blue Bombers | Don Oramasionwu | DL | Manitoba |
| 40 | Saskatchewan Roughriders | Jeff Zelinski | DB | Saint Mary's |

=== Round six ===
| Pick # | CFL team | Player | Position | School |
|---|---|---|---|---|
| 41 | Saskatchewan (via Hamilton) | Teale Orban | QB | Regina |
| 42 | Toronto Argonauts (via Edmonton) | Mark Dewit | OL | Calgary |
| 43 | Calgary Stampeders | Jonathan Lapointe | FB | Montréal |
| 44 | Toronto Argonauts (via Montreal) | Tyler Scott | WR | Western |
| 45 | Toronto Argonauts | Matt Black | DB | Saginaw Valley |
| 46 | BC Lions | Hubert Buydens | OL | Saskatchewan |
| 47 | Winnipeg Blue Bombers | Pierre-Luc Labbé | LB | Sherbrooke |
| 48 | Montreal Alouettes (via Saskatchewan) | Luc Brodeur-Jourdain | OL | Laval |
