= 2009 Montreal Alouettes season =

Canadian football team season

- Head coach: Marc Trestman
- Home stadium: Percival Molson Memorial Stadium

Results
- Record: 15–3
- Division place: 1st, East
- Playoffs: Won Grey Cup

Uniform

The 2009 Montreal Alouettes season was the 43rd season for the team in the Canadian Football League (CFL) and their 55th overall. The Alouettes won their sixth Grey Cup championship, 28–27 against the Saskatchewan Roughriders, in a game the Montreal Alouettes trailed throughout, as they came back from trailing 27–11 four minutes into the fourth quarter. It was their first win since 2002, and it ended a streak of four Grey Cup losses in their last four appearances.

The Alouettes finished in first place in the East Division setting a new franchise record of 15–3. It was the first time a team finished with a 15–3 record since the 1997 Toronto Argonauts.

== Off-season ==
=== CFL draft ===
The 2009 CFL draft took place on May 2, 2009. The Alouettes selected Calgary Dinos lineman Dylan Steenbergen in the first round, seventh overall.

Round	Pick	Player	Position	School/Club team
1	7	Dylan Steenbergen	OL	Calgary
2	14	Martin Bédard	TE	UConn
2	15	Matt Singer	OL	Manitoba
3	23	Nickolas Morin-Soucy	DL	Montreal
4	25	Stan Van Sichem	DL	Regina
4	31	Ivan Brown	DL	Saskatchewan
5	39	Benoît Boulanger	RB	Sherbrooke
6	47	Ryan Mousseau	OL	Ottawa

== Preseason ==
Week	Date	Opponent	Venue	Score	Result	Attendance	Record
A	June 17	at Toronto Argonauts	Rogers Centre	37–24	Win	18,241	1–0
B	June 23	Winnipeg Blue Bombers	Molson Stadium	31–27	Win	20,202	2–0

# Games played with colour uniforms.

== Regular season ==
=== Season standings ===
East Division
Pos	Team	Pld	W	L	T	PF	PA	PD	Pts
1	Montreal Alouettes (C, Q)	18	15	3	0	600	324	+276	30
2	Hamilton Tiger-Cats (Q)	18	9	9	0	449	428	+21	18
3	Winnipeg Blue Bombers	18	7	11	0	386	508	−122	14
4	Toronto Argonauts	18	3	15	0	328	502	−174	6

Source: "2009 Regular Season Standings". Canadian Football League. Archived from the original on 2010-02-09.
(C) First round bye; (Q) Qualified for playoffs

=== Season schedule ===
Week	Date	Opponent	Venue	Score	Result	Attendance	Record
1	July 1	at Calgary Stampeders	McMahon Stadium	40–27	Win	35,650	1–0
2	July 9	Edmonton Eskimos	Molson Stadium	50–16	Win	20,202	2–0
3	July 18	at Saskatchewan Roughriders	Mosaic Stadium	43–10	Win	30,945	3–0
4	July 23	Hamilton Tiger-Cats	Molson Stadium	21–8	Win	20,202	4–0
5	July 30	at Edmonton Eskimos	Commonwealth Stadium	33–19	Loss	33,206	4–1
6	August 7	Toronto Argonauts	Molson Stadium	25–0	Win	20,202	5–1
7	August 15	at Winnipeg Blue Bombers	Canad Inns Stadium	39–12	Win	25,053	6–1
8	August 21	Saskatchewan Roughriders	Molson Stadium	34–25	Win	20,202	7–1
9	Bye						7–1
10	September 4	at BC Lions	BC Place Stadium	19–12	Loss	27,199	7–2
11	September 13	BC Lions	Molson Stadium	28–24	Win	20,202	8–2
12	September 20	Winnipeg Blue Bombers	Molson Stadium	33–14	Win	20,202	9–2
13	September 25	at Hamilton Tiger-Cats	Ivor Wynne Stadium	42–8	Win	22,083	10–2
14	October 3	at Toronto Argonauts	Rogers Centre	27–8	Win	26,828	11–2
15	October 12	Calgary Stampeders	Molson Stadium	32–11	Win	20,202	12–2
16	October 18	Hamilton Tiger-Cats	Molson Stadium	41–38	Win	20,202	13–2
17	October 24	at Winnipeg Blue Bombers	Canad Inns Stadium	41–24	Loss	21,378	13–3
18	November 1	Winnipeg Blue Bombers	Molson Stadium	48–13	Win	20,202	14–3
19	November 7	at Toronto Argonauts	Rogers Centre	42–17	Win	28,293	15–3

# Games played with colour uniforms.
# Games played with white uniforms.
# Games played with alternate uniforms.
# Games played with alternate uniforms.
# Games played with retro uniforms.

== Roster ==
2009 Montreal Alouettes final roster
Quarterbacks: 13 Anthony Calvillo; 12 Chris Leak; 4 Adrian McPherson; Running backs: 8 Kerry Carter; 6 Avon Cobourne; 30 Dahrran Diedrick; Receivers: 85 Brian Bratton; 86 Ben Cahoon; 82 Danny Desriveaux; 18 Jamel Richardson; 25 Larry Taylor; 81 Kerry Watkins	Offensive linemen: 59 Josh Bourke T; 56 Luc Brodeur-Jourdain G/C; 68 Bryan Chiu C; 57 Scott Flory G; 65 Paul Lambert G; 54 Jeff Perrett T; Defensive linemen: 96 J.P. Bekasiak DT; 7 John Bowman DE; 91 Shawn Mayne DE; 98 Jermaine McElveen DE/DT; 72 Jeff Robertshaw DE; 9 Anwar Stewart DE; 90 Keron Williams DT; 69 Eric Wilson DT	Linebackers: 11 Chip Cox; 41 Shea Emry; 40 Diamond Ferri; 52 Ramon Guzman; 51 Cory Huclack; 46 Walter Spencer; Defensive backs: 22 Étienne Boulay; 39 Jerald Brown; 35 De'Audra Dix; 31 Mark Estelle; 17 Billy Parker; 20 Matthieu Proulx; 2 Davis Sanchez; 45 Paul Woldu	Special teams: 37 Martin Bédard LS; 15 Damon Duval K/P; Reserve roster: 19 S. J. Green WR; 44 Brandon Whitaker RB; 60 Andrew Woodruff G; Practice roster: 43 Guillaume Allard-Caméus FB; 10 Jon Banks LB; 64 Phil Bogle G; 47 Ivan Brown DE; 38 Doug Goldsby DB; 36 Leon Joe LB; 89 Glenn MacKay WR; 42 Anthony Maggiacomo LB; 84 Marco Thomas WR	Injured list: 94 Darrell Campbell DT; 80 Éric Deslauriers SB; 21 Mike Griffin FB; 0 Andrew Hawkins WR; 97 Riall Johnson DE; 23 John Mohring LB; 87 Chad Owens WR; 18 Stanford Samuels DB; 55 Skip Seagraves T; 62 Dylan Steenbergen T; 14 Stan Van Sichem LB; 1 Joel Wright DB; Suspended: James Judges DE; Italics indicate American players Roster updated 2026-04-20

== Playoffs ==
=== Schedule ===
Week	Date	Time	Opponent	Venue	Score	Result	Attendance
20	Bye						
21	November 22	1:00 PM EST	BC Lions	Olympic Stadium	56–18	Win	53,792
22	November 29	6:30 PM EST	Saskatchewan Roughriders	McMahon Stadium	28–27	Win	46,020

# Games played with colour uniforms.
# Games played with white uniforms.

=== Bracket ===
November 15: Division Semifinals
East
W4	BC Lions	34*
E2	Hamilton Tiger-Cats	27
West
W3	Edmonton Eskimos	21
W2	Calgary Stampeders	24

November 22: Division Finals
W4	BC Lions	18
E1	Montreal Alouettes	56
W2	Calgary Stampeders	17
W1	Saskatchewan Roughriders	27

November 29: 97th Grey Cup; McMahon Stadium – Calgary
E1	Montreal Alouettes	28
W1	Saskatchewan Roughriders	27

*-Team won in Overtime.

=== East Final ===
Date and time: Sunday, November 22, 1:00 PM Eastern Standard Time
Venue: Olympic Stadium, Montreal, Quebec

Team	Q1	Q2	Q3	Q4	Total
BC Lions	3	8	7	0	18
Montreal Alouettes	17	14	14	11	56

=== Grey Cup ===
Date and time: Sunday, November 29, 6:30 PM Eastern Standard Time
Venue: McMahon Stadium, Calgary, Alberta

Team	Q1	Q2	Q3	Q4	Total
Montreal Alouettes	0	3	7	18	28
Saskatchewan Roughriders	10	7	3	7	27

== Awards ==
- Avon Cobourne, Most Valuable Player
- Ben Cahoon, Dick Suderman Trophy (Grey Cup's Most Valuable Canadian)
