= 2010 Montreal Alouettes season =

Canadian football team season

- Head coach: Marc Trestman
- Home stadium: Percival Molson Memorial Stadium

Results
- Record: 12–6
- Division place: 1st, East
- Playoffs: Won Grey Cup

Uniform

The 2010 Montreal Alouettes season was the 44th season for the team in the Canadian Football League (CFL) and their 56th overall. The Alouettes won their seventh Grey Cup championship, 21–18 against the Saskatchewan Roughriders, becoming the first team to repeat as Grey Cup champions since the 1997 Toronto Argonauts.

== Offseason ==
=== CFL draft ===
Round	Pick	Player	Position	School/Club team
1	7	Kristian Matte	OL	Concordia
2	14	Chima Ihekwoaba	DL	Wilfrid Laurier
2	15	Curtis Dublanko	LB	North Dakota
3	23	Marc-Olivier Brouillette	QB	Montréal
4	31	Ryan Bomben	OL	Guelph
5	39	Brian Ridgeway	LB	Simon Fraser
6	47	Justin Conn	LB	Bishop's

== Preseason ==
Week	Date	Opponent	Venue	Score	Result	Attendance	Record
A	Sun, June 13	at Winnipeg Blue Bombers	Canad Inns Stadium	34–10	Loss	28,792	0–1
B	Sat, June 19	Toronto Argonauts	Molson Stadium	31–23	Win	23,112	1–1

# Games played with colour uniforms.

== Regular season ==
=== Season standings ===
East Division
Pos	Team	Pld	W	L	T	PF	PA	PD	Pts
1	Montreal Alouettes (C, Q)	18	12	6	0	521	475	+46	24
2	Hamilton Tiger-Cats (Q)	18	9	9	0	481	450	+31	18
3	Toronto Argonauts (Q)	18	9	9	0	373	442	−69	18
4	Winnipeg Blue Bombers	18	4	14	0	464	485	−21	8

Source: "2010 Regular Season Standings". Canadian Football League. Archived from the original on 2011-08-08.
(C) First round bye; (Q) Qualified for playoffs

=== Season schedule ===
Week	Date	Opponent	Venue	Score	Result	Attendance	Record
1	Thurs, July 1	at Saskatchewan Roughriders	Mosaic Stadium	54–51 (2OT)	Loss	30,048	0–1
2	Sun, July 11	at Edmonton Eskimos	Commonwealth Stadium	33–23	Win	30,442	1–1
3	Fri, July 16	at BC Lions	Empire Field	16–12	Win	25,162	2–1
4	Thurs, July 22	Hamilton Tiger-Cats	Molson Stadium	37–14	Win	25,012	3–1
5	Thurs, July 29	Toronto Argonauts	Molson Stadium	41–10	Win	25,012	4–1
6	Fri, Aug 6	Saskatchewan Roughriders	Molson Stadium	30–26	Win	25,012	5–1
7	Sat, Aug 14	at Toronto Argonauts	Rogers Centre	37–22	Loss	22,311	5–2
8	Thurs, Aug 19	Winnipeg Blue Bombers	Molson Stadium	39–17	Win	25,012	6–2
9	Bye						6–2
10	Fri, Sept 3	BC Lions	Molson Stadium	38–17	Loss	25,012	6–3
11	Sat, Sept 11	at Hamilton Tiger-Cats	Ivor Wynne Stadium	27–6	Win	23,452	7–3
12	Sun, Sept 19	Edmonton Eskimos	Molson Stadium	31–14	Win	25,012	8–3
13	Fri, Sept 24	at Winnipeg Blue Bombers	Canad Inns Stadium	44–40	Win	26,154	9–3
14	Fri, Oct 1	at Calgary Stampeders	McMahon Stadium	46–21	Loss	31,167	9–4
15	Mon, Oct 11	Calgary Stampeders	Molson Stadium	46–19	Win	25,012	10–4
16	Sun, Oct 17	Winnipeg Blue Bombers	Molson Stadium	22–19	Win	25,012	11–4
17	Fri, Oct 22	at Hamilton Tiger-Cats	Ivor Wynne Stadium	40–3	Loss	23,118	11–5
18	Fri, Oct 29	at Toronto Argonauts	Rogers Centre	37–30	Win	22,427	12–5
19	Sun, Nov 7	Toronto Argonauts	Molson Stadium	30–4	Loss	25,012	12–6

# Games played with colour uniforms.
# Games played with white uniforms.
# Games played with alternate uniforms.
# Games played with alternate uniforms.
# Games played with retro uniforms.

== Roster ==
2010 Montreal Alouettes final roster
Quarterbacks: 13 Anthony Calvillo; 12 Chris Leak; 5 Adrian McPherson; Running backs: 8 Kerry Carter; 6 Avon Cobourne; 30 Dahrran Diedrick; 21 Mike Griffin; Receivers: 85 Brian Bratton; 86 Ben Cahoon; 80 Éric Deslauriers; 82 Danny Desriveaux; 19 S. J. Green; 3 Tim Maypray; 18 Jamel Richardson; 25 Larry Taylor; 81 Kerry Watkins	Offensive linemen: 59 Josh Bourke T; 56 Luc Brodeur-Jourdain C/G; 57 Scott Flory G; 54 Jeff Perrett T; 55 Skip Seagraves G/T; 60 Andrew Woodruff G; Defensive linemen: 96 J.P. Bekasiak DT; 7 John Bowman DE; 90 Chima Ihekwoaba DE; 98 Jermaine McElveen DT; 72 Jeff Robertshaw DE; 9 Anwar Stewart DE; 69 Eric Wilson DT	Linebackers: 11 Chip Cox; 41 Shea Emry; 40 Diamond Ferri; 16 Raymond Fontaine; 52 Ramon Guzman; Defensive backs: 22 Étienne Boulay S; 39 Jerald Brown DH; 35 De'Audra Dix CB; 31 Mark Estelle CB; 36 Steve Holness S; 17 Billy Parker DH; 45 Paul Woldu CB	Special teams: 37 Martin Bédard LS; 15 Damon Duval K/P; Reserve roster: 47 Ivan Brown DE; 24 Colt David K/P; 0 Andrew Hawkins WR; 62 Dylan Steenbergen T; Practice roster: -- Tracy Ford RB; 49 Kyle Jones LB; 34 Emmanuel Marc RB; 50 Taylor Scott DT; -- Ty Steinkuhler DT; 2 Brandon Whitaker RB	Injured list: 1 Jon Banks LB; 64 Ryan Bomben G; 10 Marc-Olivier Brouillette LB; 0 Ike Charlton LB; 65 Paul Lambert C; 14 Brandon London WR; 93 Pat MacDonald DE; 51 Kristian Matte T; 91 Shawn Mayne DE; 88 Nickolas Morin-Soucy DE; 20 Matthieu Proulx S; 4 Ricky Santos QB; 46 Walter Spencer LB; 23 LeRoy Vann CB; 89 Gavin Walls DE; Italics indicate American players

== Coaching staff ==
2010 Montreal Alouettes staff
Front office: Owner – Bob Wetenhall; President and ceo – Larry Smith; VP, General Manager and Director of Football Operations and Player Personnel – Jim Popp; Assistant general manager – Marcel Desjardins; Football operations assistant/scout – Joey Abrams; Football operations assistant/scout – Uzooma Okeke; Head coaches: Head coach – Marc Trestman; Offensive coaches: Offensive Coordinator, Quarterbacks & Assistant Head Coach – Scott Milanovich; Running Backs & Assistant Offensive Line –[Andy Bischoff; Receivers – Marcus Brady; Offensive line – Jonathan Himebauch	Defensive coaches: Defensive Coordinator & Defensive Backs – Tim Burke; Defensive line – Mike Sinclair; Linebackers – Tim Tibesar; Defensive Assistant & Football Operations Assistant – Jean-Marc Edme; Special teams coaches: Special teams assistant – Carson Walch; → Coaching staff

== Awards and records ==
=== CFL Eastern All-Stars ===
- QB – Anthony Calvillo, CFL Eastern All-Star
- WR – Jamel Richardson, CFL Eastern All-Star
- OT – Josh Bourke, CFL Eastern All-Star
- OG – Scott Flory, CFL Eastern All-Star
- DE – John Bowman, CFL Eastern All-Star
- LB – Chip Cox, CFL Eastern All-Star
- CB – Mark Estelle, CFL Eastern All-Star
- DB – Jerald Brown, CFL Eastern All-Star
- K – Damon Duval, CFL Eastern All-Star

=== Milestones ===
On October 11, in the Alouettes home game against Calgary, Ben Cahoon became the CFL's all-time leader in pass receptions, surpassing Terry Vaughn's previous record of 1,006.

== Playoffs ==
=== Schedule ===
Week	Date	Time	Opponent	Venue	Score	Result	Attendance
20	Bye						
21	Nov 21	1:00 PM EST	Toronto Argonauts	Olympic Stadium	48–17	Win	58,021
22	Nov 28	6:00 PM EST	Saskatchewan Roughriders	Commonwealth Stadium	21–18	Win	63,317

# Games played with colour uniforms.
# Games played with white uniforms.

=== Bracket ===
November 14: Division Semi-Finals
E3	Toronto Argonauts	16
E2	Hamilton Tiger-Cats	13
W3	BC Lions	38
W2	Saskatchewan Roughriders	41*

November 21: Division Finals
E3	Toronto Argonauts	17
E1	Montreal Alouettes	48
W2	Saskatchewan Roughriders	20
W1	Calgary Stampeders	16

November 28: 98th Grey Cup; Commonwealth Stadium – Edmonton
E1	Montreal Alouettes	21
W2	Saskatchewan Roughriders	18

*-Team won in Overtime.

=== East Final ===
Toronto at Montreal

Team	1	2	3	4	Total
Argonauts	0	6	3	8	17
• Alouettes	17	10	7	14	48

- Date: November 21
- Location: Olympic Stadium
  Montreal, QC
- Game start: 1:00 PM EST
- Game attendance: 58,021
- Game weather: None (Closed Stadium)
- Referee: Jake Ireland
- TV announcers (TSN): Rod Black, Duane Forde, Sara Orlesky

=== 98th Grey Cup Final ===
Montreal vs. Saskatchewan

Team	1	2	3	4	Total
• Alouettes	8	0	3	10	21
Roughriders	7	4	0	7	18

- Date: November 28
- Location: Commonwealth Stadium
  Edmonton, AB
- Game start: 6:00 PM EST
- Game attendance: 63,317
- TV announcers (TSN): Chris Cuthbert (Play by play), Glen Suitor (Colour)
