= Chip Cox =

American gridiron football player (born 1983)

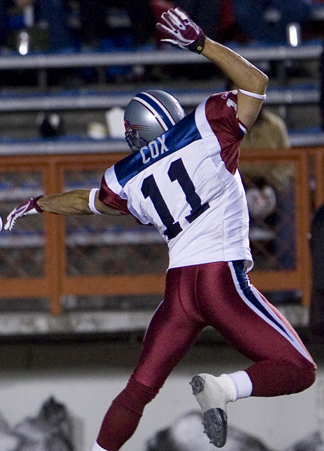
- Cox with the Montreal Alouettes in 2007

No. 11
- Position: Linebacker

Personal information
- Born: June 24, 1983 (age 43); Columbus, Ohio, U.S.
- Listed height: 5 ft 9 in (1.75 m)
- Listed weight: 185 lb (84 kg)

Career information
- High school: Beechcroft (Columbus)
- College: Ohio
- NFL draft: 2005: undrafted

Career history
- 2005: Detroit Lions*
- 2006: Montreal Alouettes
- 2007: Washington Redskins*
- 2007–2018: Montreal Alouettes
- * Offseason or practice squad member only

Awards and highlights
- 2× Grey Cup champion (2009, 2010); CFL's Most Outstanding Defensive Player Award (2013); James P. McCaffrey Trophy (2013); 3× CFL All-Star (2009, 2011, 2013); 6× CFL East All-Star (2009, 2010, 2011, 2012, 2013, 2014); CFL records: Longest fumble return (108 yards) (2011); Most career fumble return yards (392); Most career fumble return touchdowns (6)
- Stats at CFL.ca
- Canadian Football Hall of Fame (Class of 2022)

Chip Cox (born June 24, 1983) is an American former professional football linebacker who played for the Montreal Alouettes of the Canadian Football League (CFL) for 13 seasons. He is a two-time Grey Cup champion, winning in 2009 and 2010, and winner of the CFL's Most Outstanding Defensive Player Award in 2013. He is also a six-time CFL Divisional All-Star and three-time CFL All-Star. He holds three CFL records, including most career fumble return yards (392), most career fumble return touchdowns (6), and the record for longest fumble return (108 yards in 2011). Cox also holds several Alouettes records including most career tackles (979), most single season defensive tackles (115 in 2013), and most defensive tackles in a single game (13 against Calgary on July 1, 2012). He played college football for the Ohio Bobcats.

== Early life ==
Cox lettered three years in both track and football at Beechcroft High School in Columbus, earning special mention all-state recognition in football his senior year. Cox became a second-degree black belt in Tae Kwon Do in his Junior year.

== College career ==
As a player for the Ohio Bobcats, Cox recorded 240 career tackles (176 solo), nine tackles for losses, five sacks, four interceptions, 29 passes defended, seven forced fumbles, two fumble recoveries and three blocked field goals. He holds the Ohio school record for the 40-yard dash (4.37 seconds), and started every game his sophomore and junior years, but battled injuries as a senior, only playing in nine games. He was also a member of the Ohio Bobcats track and field team, where he was a premiere sprinter and placed sixth in the 100 meter dash at the 2004 Mid-American Conference championships.

== Professional career ==
Cox was originally signed by the Detroit Lions as an undrafted rookie free agent on April 28, 2005, and he spent the 2005 training camp and preseason with the team. However, Cox was released on August 30, and he subsequently played in the CFL for the Montreal Alouettes. On January 9, 2007, he was signed by the Washington Redskins but was cut before training camp and returned to Montreal. After switching to the linebacker position for the 2009 season, Cox led the CFL in forced fumbles and capped off the year by winning the 97th Grey Cup with the Alouettes. In 2010, the Alouettes repeated as champions and won the 98th Grey Cup.

On November 5, 2011 against the BC Lions, Cox reached 400 career defensive tackles with the Alouettes, becoming the only player in club history to achieve this feat.

In 2013, Cox had a career high, and league leading, number of tackles with 115. He also had 12 sacks (career high) and four interceptions en route to winning the CFL's Most Outstanding Defensive Player Award and the James P. McCaffrey Trophy. With his 115 tackles that season, he broke the Montreal Alouettes single-season record of 110 set by Tracy Gravely in the 1996 CFL season.

On December 2, 2014, the Alouettes announced that they had resigned Cox to a three-year deal worth more than $200,000 annually, which general manager Jim Popp stated would make him the CFL's highest-paid defensive player. He continued to have strong performances, registering at least 65 defensive tackles in each of the subsequent four seasons. He became a free agent on February 13, 2019.

Cox was announced as a member of the Canadian Football Hall of Fame 2022 class on June 21, 2022.
