= Tim Maypray =

American gridiron football player (1988–2019)

No. 8
- Position: Wide receiver

Personal information
- Born: May 13, 1988; Madisonville, Kentucky, U.S.
- Died: January 15, 2019 (aged 30); Mooresville, North Carolina, U.S.
- Listed height: 5 ft 9 in (1.75 m)
- Listed weight: 185 lb (84 kg)

Career information
- High school: Randolph-Macon Academy
- College: VMI
- NFL draft: 2010: undrafted

Career history
- Montreal Alouettes (2010–2011); Ottawa Redblacks (2014)

Awards and highlights
- Grey Cup champion (2010)
- Stats at CFL.ca (archive)

Timothy Wayne Maypray II (May 13, 1988 – January 15, 2019) was an American professional gridiron football wide receiver who played in the Canadian Football League (CFL) with the Montreal Alouettes and Ottawa Redblacks. Maypray returned kicks for the Alouettes during the 2010 season. During his CFL debut against the Saskatchewan Roughriders, Maypray returned a missed field goal 125 yards for a touchdown.

== Playing career ==
=== Amateur ===
Maypray played his high school football at Randolph-Macon Academy in Front Royal, Virginia. He was a two-time letterman in football and basketball.

Maypray played college football at Virginia Military Institute (VMI) where he played several different positions (wide receiver, running back and quarterback) and returned kicks. During his four-year career at VMI, Maypray scored 39 touchdowns. Maypray was named the 2006 Big South Freshman of the Year. He was named First Team All Big South at kick returner, and Second Team All Big South at wide receiver after his sophomore season. Heading into the 2009 season, Maypray received several pre-season honours including being named to the Big South Football Conference Pre-Season All Conference Team at both quarterback and as a punt returner. He was also voted the 2009 Big South Pre-Season Offensive Player of the Year.

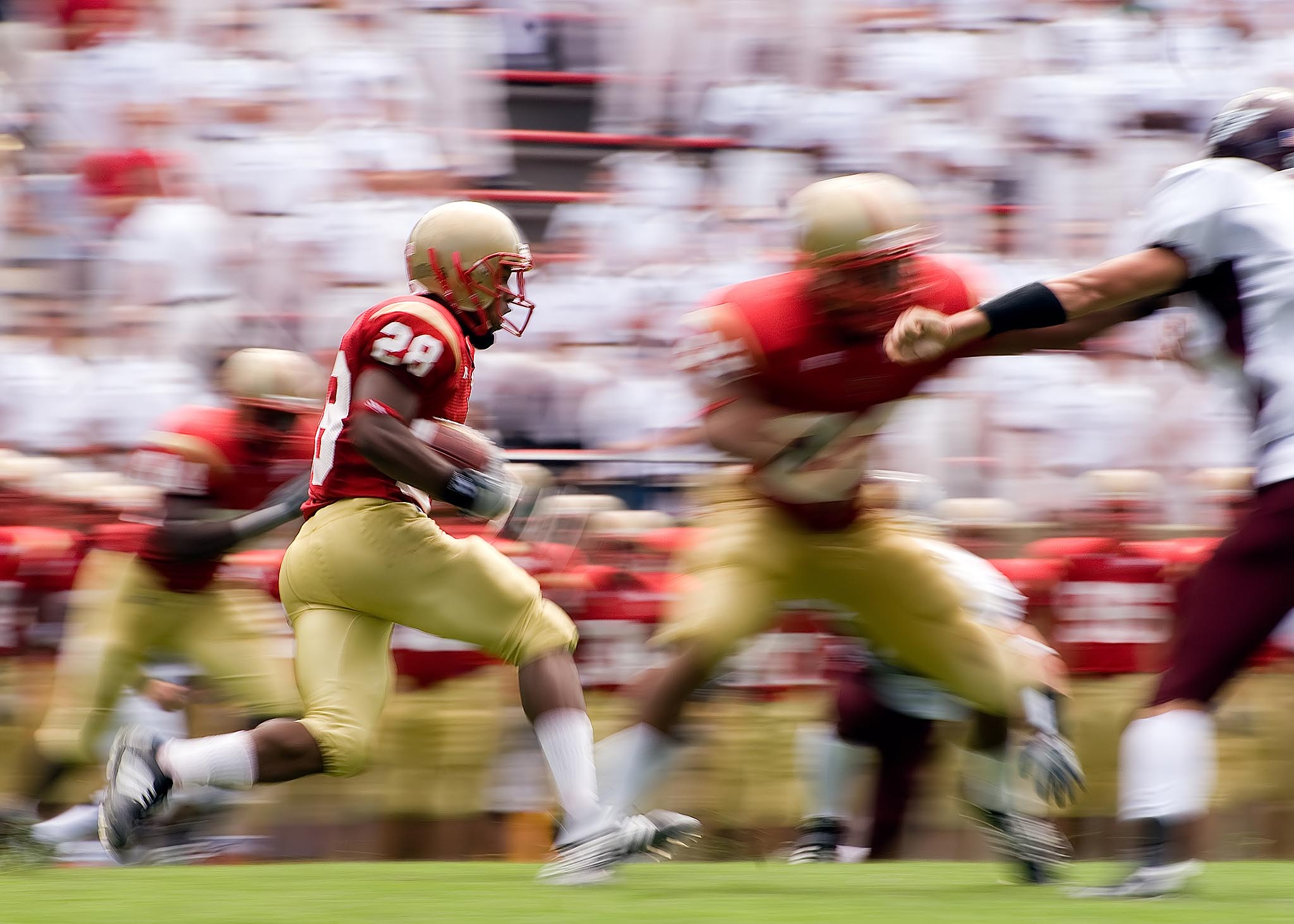
Tim Maypray (28) returns a kick for VMI against Lock Haven, September 1, 2007.

=== Professional ===
Maypray made his professional debut with the Montreal Alouettes of the Canadian Football League (CFL) during the 2010 season. During his first game, Maypray returned a missed field goal by Luca Congi of the Saskatchewan Roughriders 125 yards for a touchdown, setting a team record. During the Alouettes next meeting against the Roughriders, Maypray returned another missed field goal 118 yards for a touchdown. After his second missed field goal return for a touchdown, Maypray was named the CFL's Special Teams Player of the Week.

=== Offseason ===
During the off season of the CFL, Maypray worked at his old high school, Randolph-Macon Academy.

== Personal life ==
While at VMI, Maypray also played on the basketball team. He majored in psychology.

Maypray died on January 15, 2019.
