= Van Sichem =

Van Sichem or van Sichem is a Dutch language surname. It may refer to:

- Christoffel van Sichem the Elder (1546, Basel – 1624), a Dutch print artist, draftsperson, printer and publisher
- Christoffel van Sichem the Younger (1581, Basel – 1658, Amsterdam), a Dutch woodcutter, engraver and publisher
- Stan Van Sichem (born April 2, 1987), a former professional Canadian football defensive lineman
