= De'Audra Dix =

American gridiron football player (born 1984)

No. 21
- Position: Defensive back

Personal information
- Born: March 3, 1984 (age 42); Merritt Island, Florida, U.S.
- Listed height: 5 ft 10 in (1.78 m)
- Listed weight: 160 lb (73 kg)

Career information
- College: Johnson C. Smith
- NFL draft: 2008: undrafted

Career history
- Montreal Alouettes (2009–2012); Tampa Bay Storm (2013–2014); Los Angeles KISS (2015)

Awards and highlights
- 2× Grey Cup champion (2009, 2010)

Career CFL statistics
- Tackles: 59
- Interceptions: 2
- Fumble recoveries: 2
- Kickoff returns: 7
- Kickoff return yards: 162
- Stats at CFL.ca (archived)

Career AFL statistics
- Tackles: 83
- Passes defended: 27
- Fumble recoveries: 3
- Interceptions: 7
- Stats at ArenaFan.com

De'Audra Dix (born March 3, 1984) is an American former professional football defensive back. He was signed as a street free agent by the Montreal Alouettes in 2009. He played college football for the Johnson C. Smith Golden Bulls. In 2008, he was named to the Division II First-team All-American in his senior year at Johnson C. Smith University.

== Professional career ==
=== Montreal Alouettes ===
He recorded his first career interception on September 13, 2009, against the BC Lions in a 28–24 Montreal Alouettes win.

=== Tampa Bay Storm ===
Dix signed with the Tampa Bay Storm of the Arena Football League for the 2013 season. Dix was placed on injury reserve before the final week of the regular season, and missed the team's playoff game.

=== Los Angeles KISS ===
Dix was assigned to the Los Angeles KISS on March 17, 2015. On May 19, 2015, Dix was placed on reassignment by the KISS.

=== Career statistics ===
| Regular season statistics | | | | Tackles | | | | | Interceptions | | | | | | Punt returns | | | | | Fumbles | | |
| Season | Team | GP | GS | Comb | Total | Ast | Sck | Sfty | PDef | Int | Yds | Avg | Lng | TDs | Ret | RetY | Avg | Lng | TDs | FUM | Lost | FF |
|---|---|---|---|---|---|---|---|---|---|---|---|---|---|---|---|---|---|---|---|---|---|---|
| 2010 | Montreal Alouettes | – | – | 34 | 31 | 3 | 0.0 | 0 | – | 2 | 0 | 0.0 | 4 | 0 | – | – | – | – | – | – | – | – |
| 2011 | Montreal Alouettes | – | – | 31 | 28 | 3 | 0.0 | 0 | 0 | 0 | 0 | 0.0 | 0 | 0 | – | – | – | – | – | – | – | – |
| 2013 | Tampa Bay Storm | 7 | – | 32 | 28 | 5 | 0.0 | 0 | 9 | 5 | 64 | 12.8 | – | 0 | – | – | – | – | – | – | – | 00 |
| 2014 | Tampa Bay Storm | 8 | – | 30 | 24 | 6 | 0.0 | 0 | 11 | 1 | 0 | 0.0 | – | 0 | – | – | – | – | – | – | – | 00 |
| 2015 | Los Angeles Kiss | 36 | – | 39 | 31 | 8 | 0.0 | 0 | 7 | 1 | 8 | 8.0 | – | 0 | – | – | – | – | – | – | – | 00 |
| Totals | | 51 | -- | 166 | 146 | 25 | 0.0 | 0 | 27 | 9 | 72 | 8.0 | 8 | 0 | -- | -- | -- | -- | -- | -- | -- | 0 |
