= Marc Trestman =

American gridiron football player and coach (born 1956)

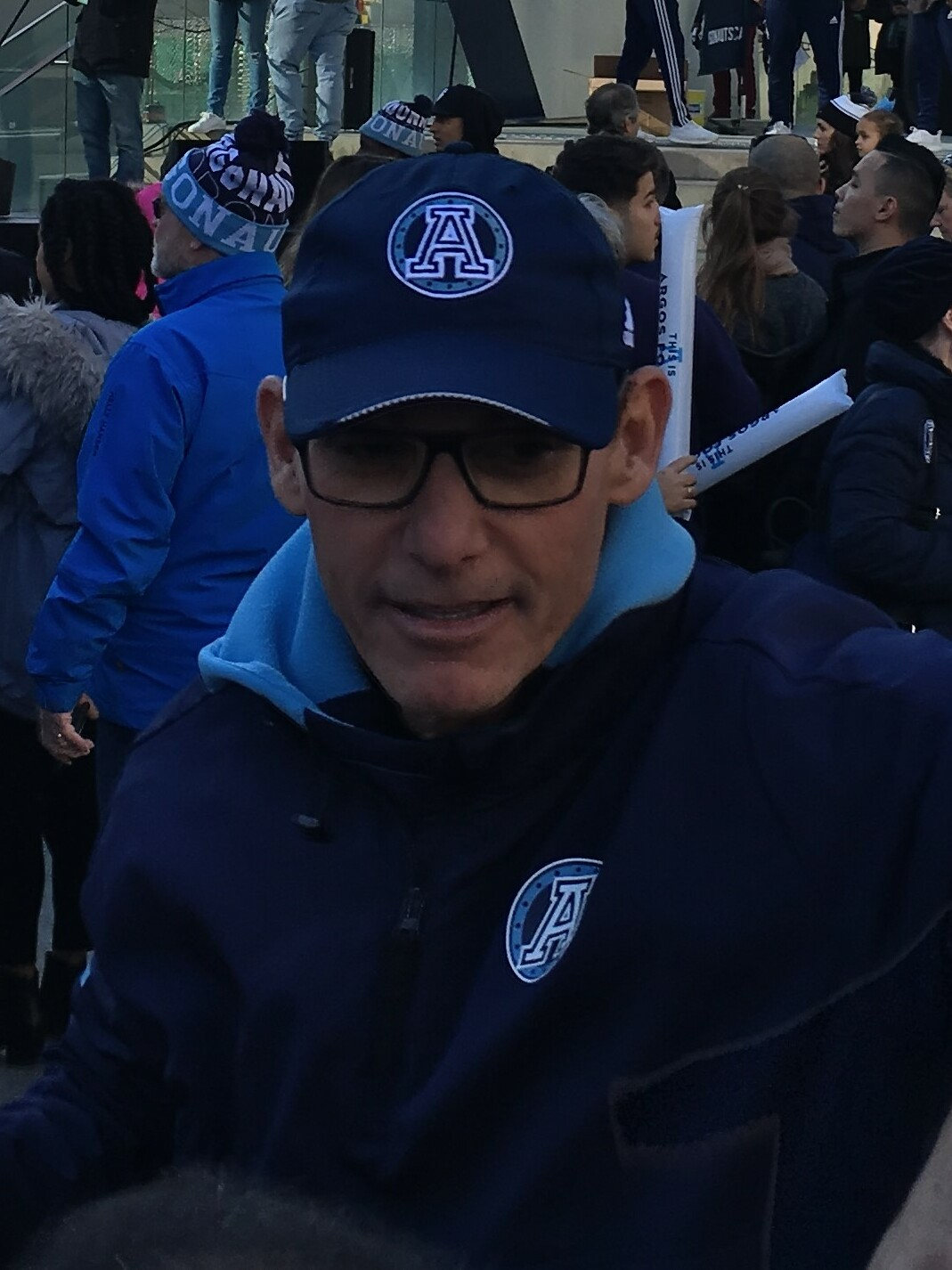
- Trestman at the 105th Grey Cup celebration rally

Personal information
- Born: January 15, 1956 (age 70); Minneapolis, Minnesota, U.S.

Career information
- Position: Defensive back
- High school: St. Louis Park (St. Louis Park, Minnesota)
- College: Minnesota (1974–1977); Minnesota State–Moorhead (1978)
- NFL draft: 1979: undrafted

Career history

Playing
- Minnesota Vikings (1979–1980)*
- * Offseason or practice squad member only

Coaching
- Miami (FL) (1981–1983) Volunteer assistant coach; Miami (FL) (1983–1984) Quarterbacks coach; Minnesota Vikings (1985–1986) Running backs coach; Tampa Bay Buccaneers (1987) Quarterbacks coach; Cleveland Browns (1988–1989) Offensive coordinator & quarterbacks coach; Minnesota Vikings (1990–1991) Quarterbacks coach; San Francisco 49ers (1995–1996) Offensive coordinator & quarterbacks coach; Detroit Lions (1997) Quarterbacks coach; Arizona Cardinals (1998–2000) Offensive coordinator & quarterbacks coach; Oakland Raiders (2001–2003) Offensive coordinator & quarterbacks coach; Miami Dolphins (2004) Assistant head coach; NC State (2005–2006) Offensive coordinator & quarterbacks coach; New Orleans Saints (2007) Consultant; Montreal Alouettes (2008–2012) Head coach; Chicago Bears (2013–2014) Head coach; Baltimore Ravens (2015–2016) Offensive coordinator; Toronto Argonauts (2017–2018) Head coach; Tampa Bay Vipers (2020) Head coach & general manager; Los Angeles Chargers (2024) Senior offensive assistant

Awards and highlights
- 3× Grey Cup champion (2009, 2010, 2017); 2× CFL Coach of the Year (2009, 2017); NCAA Division I-A national champion (1983)

Head coaching record
- Regular season: CFL: 68–40 (.630); NFL: 13–19 (.406); XFL: 1–4 (.200)
- Coaching profile at Pro Football Reference

Marc Marlyn Trestman (born January 15, 1956) is an American professional football coach. He led the Montreal Alouettes of the Canadian Football League (CFL) to back-to-back Grey Cup victories in 2009 and 2010, and another as head coach of the Toronto Argonauts in 2017. He was also named CFL Coach of the Year in 2009 and 2017. He has also coached in the National Football League (NFL).

In addition, Trestman has served as a head coach, offensive coordinator and positions coach for a number of different teams, with the most notable of these tenures being a two-season stint as the head coach of the NFL's Chicago Bears in 2013 and 2014. He played college football as a quarterback for three seasons with the Minnesota Golden Gophers, and one season for the Minnesota State–Moorhead Dragons. Trestman's most recent coaching position was as the head coach for the Tampa Bay Vipers of the XFL, which came to a premature end when the season was terminated due to the COVID-19 pandemic.

== Early life ==
Marc Marlyn Trestman was born on January 15, 1956, in Minneapolis, Minnesota. In 1974, he graduated from St. Louis Park High School in St. Louis Park, Minnesota. He played college football as quarterback for the Minnesota Golden Gophers football team for three seasons, in which he served as a backup quarterback for Tony Dungy. He transferred as a senior to play quarterback at Minnesota State University Moorhead. Trestman received a B.A. degree in political science from Minnesota in 1979 and a J.D. degree from the University of Miami School of Law. He was admitted to the Florida Bar in 1983.

Trestman went to training camp with the Minnesota Vikings 1979 and 1980 as a defensive back.

== Coaching career ==
=== NCAA ===
He entered football coaching at the University of Miami in 1981 as a volunteer coach. In 1983, he was named quarterbacks coach. That year, quarterback Bernie Kosar passed for 2,329 yards and Miami won the national championship. The next year, Kosar completed 262 passes for 3,642 yards, both school records.

In 2005, Trestman returned to college football coaching as the NC State Wolfpack offensive coordinator, guiding the team to a win in the Meineke Car Care Bowl. However, at the end of the 2006 season, he, along with the entire coaching staff, was fired.

=== NFL ===
Trestman moved to the National Football League and coached running backs with the Minnesota Vikings in 1985 and 1986. He served as quarterbacks coach first with the Tampa Bay Buccaneers in 1987 and then the Cleveland Browns in 1988. In Cleveland he again coached Kosar and the team finished 10–6 and made the playoffs. His promotion to offensive coordinator in 1989 was made before the team named Bud Carson as Marty Schottenheimer's successor as head coach. Kosar passed for 3,533 yards and 18 TDs that season, while wide receiver Webster Slaughter had a franchise record 1,236 receiving yards. Trestman was dismissed after the Browns' third loss in the AFC Championship game in four years, primarily due to his strained relationship with Carson.

In 1990, Trestman returned to Minnesota as quarterbacks coach for the Vikings. He spent two years there and then left coaching for three years, and worked in the municipal bond market during that timespan.

He returned to the NFL in 1995 as quarterbacks coach and offensive coordinator with San Francisco, where he served in that capacity through 1996. The first year he was in San Francisco, the team led the NFL with 457 points scored, 644 pass attempts and 4,779 passing yards.

Trestman joined the Detroit Lions as quarterbacks coach in 1997. That year Lions quarterback Scott Mitchell passed for 3,484 yards, fourth most in team history.

In 1998, he was with the Arizona Cardinals as quarterbacks coach and offensive coordinator. That year quarterback Jake Plummer threw for 3,737 yards, and the Cardinals made the playoffs for the first time since 1982 and won their first post season game in 51 years.

He next went to the Oakland Raiders in 2001 as the quarterbacks coach. In 2002 he was promoted to offensive coordinator and the Raiders led the NFL in total offense with 389.8 yards per game and passing yards with 279.7 per game. Under Trestman's guidance, Raiders QB Rich Gannon won the 2002 NFL MVP award as the Raiders reached Super Bowl XXXVII, losing to the Tampa Bay Buccaneers.

Trestman spent the 2004 season with the Miami Dolphins before returning to the college ranks (see above).

In 2007, Trestman spent time with the New Orleans Saints as a consultant for Sean Payton.

=== CFL ===
On December 18, 2007, Trestman was named head coach for the Montreal Alouettes of the Canadian Football League. The Alouettes lost 22–14 to the Calgary Stampeders in the 2008 Grey Cup championship game. At the conclusion of the season, he was nominated for the CFL's Annis Stukus Award as the league's top coach, with Calgary's John Hufnagel winning.

In 2009, Trestman led the Alouettes to win the 2009 Grey Cup over the Saskatchewan Roughriders, winning with a field goal with no time left on the clock. The Alouettes finished the regular season that year with a franchise-best 15–3 record, which was also the league's best record since 1997. After the season, it was announced that Trestman was signed through the 2012 season as the head coach.

Trestman then led the Alouettes to another Grey Cup win in 2010. After winning the 2010 Grey Cup, Trestman won the CFL's Coach of the year award. Trestman is the only coach in Alouettes history to win back-to-back Grey Cups. Under Trestman's guidance, Alouettes QB Anthony Calvillo won back-to-back MVP awards in 2008 and 2009.

=== Return to the NFL ===
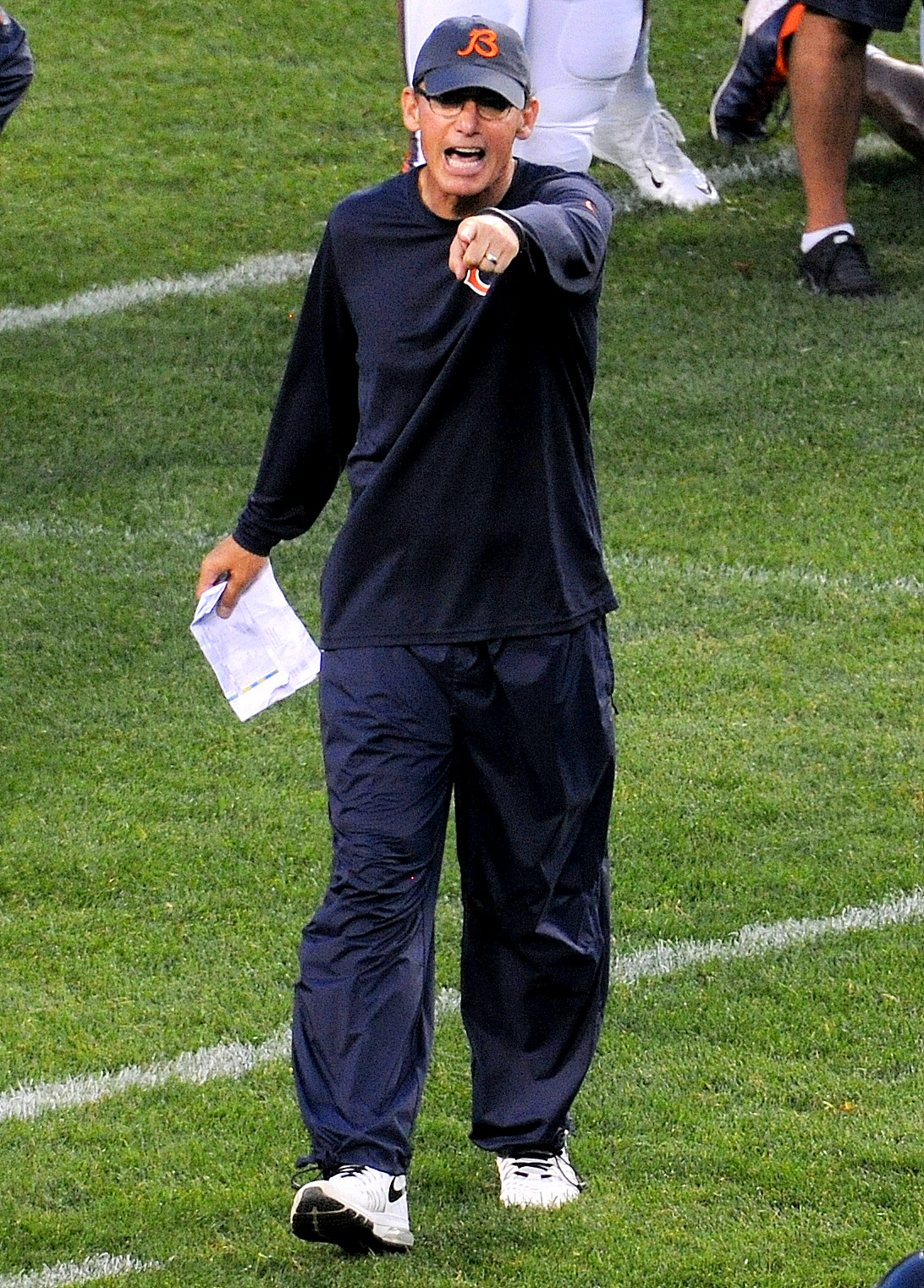
Trestman at 2014 Chicago Bears training camp.

In 2012, Trestman was interviewed by the Indianapolis Colts for their vacant position of head coach. The Colts eventually hired Chuck Pagano.

In early 2013, Trestman was interviewed by the Chicago Bears and the Cleveland Browns for their respective vacant head coaching positions. On January 16, 2013, he was named head coach of the Bears.

In Trestman's first game with the Bears, they won 24–21 against the Cincinnati Bengals; he became the fourth Bears head coach to win his debut game, joining George Halas (1920), Neill Armstrong (1978) and Dick Jauron (1999). After winning in week two against the Minnesota Vikings, Trestman also joined Halas and Armstrong as the only coaches in Bears history to win his first two games as Bears head coach. The week fifteen win against the Cleveland Browns improved the Bears to 8–6; at the time, the 8 wins were the most by a first-year head coach in franchise history since Paddy Driscoll in 1956 (9 wins) and the most by a Bears first-year head coach in the Super Bowl era. Unfortunately, Trestman did not lead the Bears to the playoffs as a late-season loss skid ended any playoff hopes. Trestman's first season as Bears head coach ended with an 8–8 record, second in the NFC North. Trestman's offensive prowess aided the Bears, who concluded 2013 with the second-best scoring offense with 445 points, only trailing the record-setting Denver Broncos offense, and a 14-place increase from 2012. The Bears also had the fifth-best offensive yardage gained with 4281 yards. The offense also broke team records in total yards (6,109), passing yards (4,450), passing touchdowns (32) and first downs (344).

The Bears struggled during Trestman's second season as head coach, earning a 5–11 record at season's end. The season included blowout losses to New England and Green Bay (23-51 and 14-55, respectively) midseason, as well as a five-game losing streak to end the season. Despite this, Trestman spoke with confidence that he would be back as the Bears' head coach next season following a 13–9 loss to the Minnesota Vikings. Trestman and general manager Phil Emery were fired at the end of the season. Trestman issued a final statement before leaving: "I want to thank Virginia, George and the McCaskey family, Phil Emery and Ted Phillips for giving me the opportunity to be the head coach of the Chicago Bears. I also want to thank all the coaches and players who gave us everything we asked over the past two years. I have tremendous respect for this organization. Chicago is a special city with great fans. I appreciate the warm support my family and I received."

Trestman was appointed as the offensive coordinator for the Baltimore Ravens on January 20, 2015. He was fired on October 10, 2016, a day after a 16–10 loss to the Washington Redskins and replaced by Marty Mornhinweg.

=== Return to the CFL ===
Trestman was named the head coach of the Toronto Argonauts on February 28, 2017.

Despite being hired late in the off-season, Trestman's first season in Toronto went above expectations, given the circumstances. Trestman inherited a roster that finished last in the league the previous season, and guided the team to a 9–9 record, which was good enough for first place in the East and a first-round bye in the playoffs. On Sunday, November 26, 2017, Trestman won his third Grey Cup when the Argonauts defeated the Stampeders 27–24. During that season he won the Annis Stukus Trophy and was named CFL coach of the year.

The 2018 season for the Argonauts under Trestman was filled with poor play and injuries (most notably to quarterback Ricky Ray) resulting in the team missing the post-season following the Grey Cup Championship the year before.

Trestman was fired at the conclusion of the 2018 Toronto Argonauts season, the day following the team's 24–9 loss to the Ottawa Redblacks (which was played on November 2, 2018) as a direct consequence of the team's poor performance during the 2018 campaign, winning only 4 games the year after winning a championship. The 2018 CFL season marked the first time during Trestman's CFL coaching career that a team he represented did not reach the playoffs.

=== Tampa Bay Vipers ===
On March 2, 2019, Trestman was hired to be the head coach and general manager of the then-unnamed Tampa Bay XFL team soon to be named the Tampa Bay Vipers.

=== Return to the NFL ===
On February 14, 2024, Trestman was hired by Jim Harbaugh to join the Los Angeles Chargers as a senior offensive assistant.

== Head coaching record ==
=== CFL ===
Team	Year	Regular season					Postseason		
Team	Year	Won	Lost	Ties	Win %	Finish	Won	Lost	Result
MTL	2008	11	7	0	.611	1st in East Division	1	1	Lost in Grey Cup
MTL	2009	15	3	0	.833	1st in East Division	2	0	Won Grey Cup
MTL	2010	12	6	0	.667	1st in East Division	2	0	Won Grey Cup
MTL	2011	10	8	0	.556	2nd in East Division	0	1	Lost in East Semi-Final
MTL	2012	11	7	0	.611	1st in East Division	0	1	Lost in East Final
TOR	2017	9	9	0	.500	1st in East Division	2	0	Won Grey Cup
TOR	2018	4	14	0	.222	4th in East Division	-	-	Did not qualify
Total		72	54	0	.571		7	3	

=== NFL ===
Team	Year	Regular season					Postseason			
Team	Year	Won	Lost	Ties	Win %	Finish	Won	Lost	Win %	Result
CHI	2013	8	8	0	.500	2nd in NFC North	did not qualify			
CHI	2014	5	11	0	.313	4th in NFC North	did not qualify			
Total		13	19	0	.406		0	0	.000	–

=== XFL ===
Team	Year	Regular season					Postseason			
Team	Year	Won	Lost	Ties	Win %	Finish	Won	Lost	Win %	Result
TB	2020	1	4	0	.200	TBD	0	0	.000	Season cancelled
Total		1	4	0	.200		0	0	.000	

== Personal life ==
Trestman has two daughters.

In 2010, he released his first book as an author titled PERSEVERANCE: Life Lessons on Leadership and Teamwork.

Currently, he is serving as an adjunct professor at the University of Miami Florida School of Law where he is teaching a course on leadership called "A Playbook for Leadership and the Law." He also co-hosted The Leadership Gameplan Podcast on behalf of the University of Miami School of Law with Greg Levy.

Trestman is a "Football Player Development" instructor for the online sports-career training school Sports Management Worldwide. He is also a frequent contributor to The 33rd Team, a "football Think Tank" with contributors including Bill Parcells, Bill Cowher, Eddie George, Ronde Barber, and Bill Polian, among others.
