= S. J. Green =

American football player (born 1985)

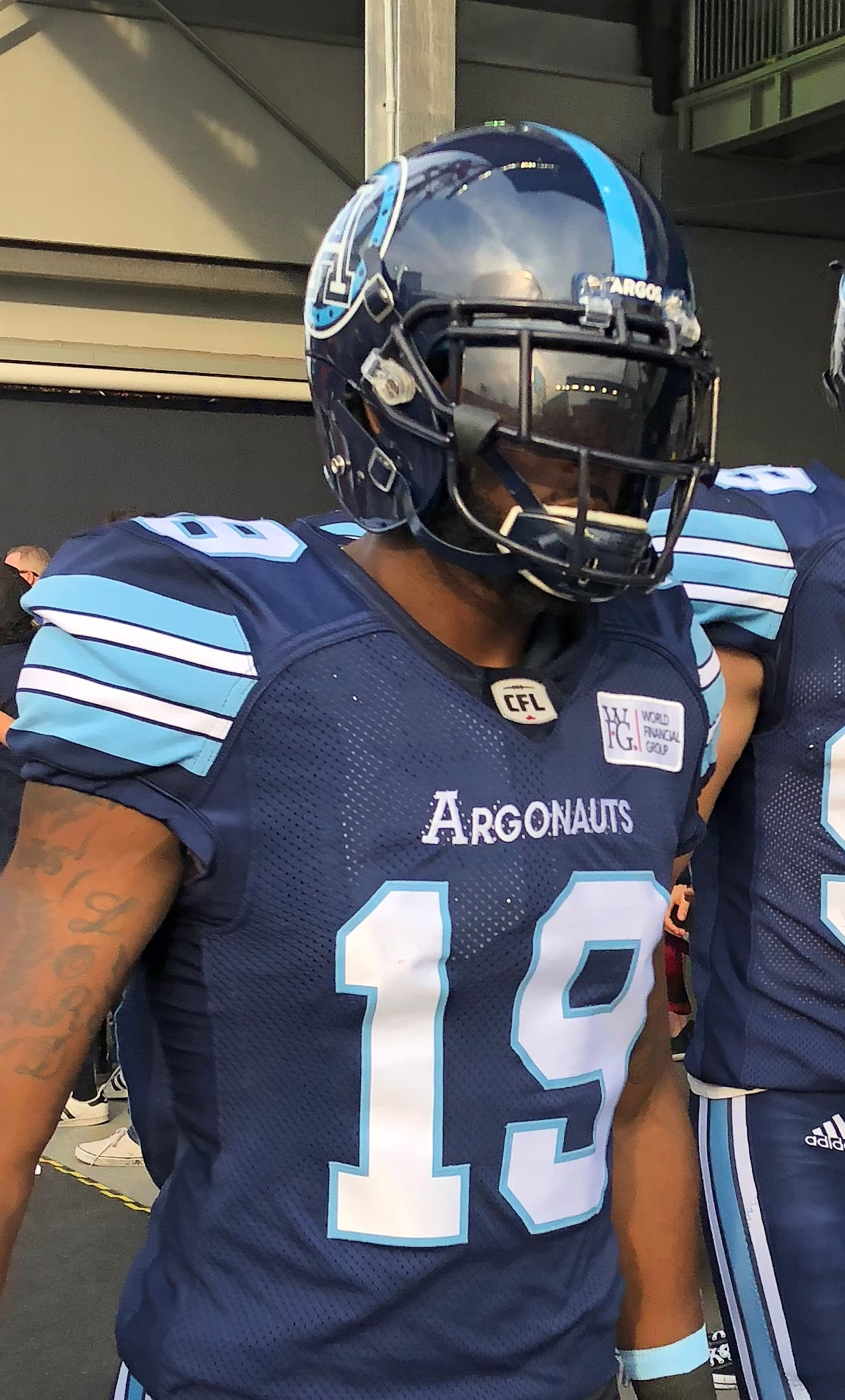
- Green with the Toronto Argonauts in 2018

Profile
- Position: Wide receiver

Personal information
- Born: June 20, 1985 (age 41); Fort Worth, Texas, U.S.
- Listed height: 6 ft 3 in (1.91 m)
- Listed weight: 216 lb (98 kg)

Career information
- High school: Brandon (Brandon, Florida)
- College: South Florida
- NFL draft: 2007: undrafted

Career history
- Montreal Alouettes (2007–2009); New York Jets (2010)*; Montreal Alouettes (2010–2016); Toronto Argonauts (2017–2019); Seattle Dragons (2020)*; Tampa Bay Vipers (2020)
- * Offseason or practice squad member only

Awards and highlights
- 3× Grey Cup champion (2009, 2010, 2017); 2× CFL All Star (2013, 2017); 8× CFL East All Star (2011–2015, 2017–2019)

Career CFL statistics
- Games played: 170
- Receptions: 716
- Receiving yards: 10,222
- Touchdowns: 60
- Canadian Football Hall of Fame

Solomon H. Green III (born June 20, 1985) is an American former professional football player who was a wide receiver for 13 years in the Canadian Football League (CFL). He is a three-time Grey Cup champion, having won in 2009 and 2010 with the Montreal Alouettes and in 2017 with the Toronto Argonauts. He is also a two-time CFL All-Star and an eight-time CFL East All-Star. He was also a member of the New York Jets, Seattle Dragons, and Tampa Bay Vipers. Green played college football for the South Florida Bulls.

== Professional career ==
=== Montreal Alouettes (first stint) ===
Green signed with the Montreal Alouettes in May 2007 following the 2007 NFL draft. His first career Canadian Football League (CFL) reception came on June 29, 2007, against the Saskatchewan Roughriders. His first career touchdown was against the Edmonton Eskimos on October 31, 2008, which was the fifth game of his professional career. Green was a member of both the 97th Grey Cup and 98th Grey Cup championship team with the Montreal Alouettes.

=== New York Jets ===
Six days before signing a future contract with the New York Jets on January 9, 2010, Green was listed as a "CFL player of interest to the NFL" by The Globe and Mail.

On May 18, 2010, the Jets released Green, following the first team Organized Team Activities practice of the year.

=== Montreal Alouettes (second stint) ===
Following his release from the Jets, Green re-joined the Alouettes in time for the start of the 2010 CFL season. For the 2010 season, Green recorded a career-high 10 touchdown receptions and two two-point conversions to go along with 875 receiving yards. In the 98th Grey Cup, Green caught nine passes for 102 yards to help the Alouettes win their second consecutive Grey Cup championship.

In 2010 and 2011, Green recorded back-to-back 1,000-yard seasons and was named an East Division All-Star both years. On February 13, 2013, it was announced that Green had signed a two-year contract extension that would keep him signed through to the 2014 CFL season. Green played in 15 of the 18 regular season games in the 2014 season and played in both of Montreal's playoff games. In the 2 playoff games Green amassed and impressive 13 pass receptions for 221 yards, with 4 touchdowns. The 2014 season was his first season to not reach the 1,000-yard plateau since the 2010 season. Nevertheless, Green was named a CFL East All-Star for the fourth consecutive season. Following the 2014 season, Green and the Alouettes agreed to a 3-year contract extension that will keep him with the team through the 2017 season.

Green had a relatively productive 2015 season as Green crossed the 1,000 yard plateau for the fourth time in his career, however, Green only caught 3 touchdown passes; a personal low since the 2009 season. Green suffered a leg injury in the second week of the 2016 CFL season and did not return to the game. Results from the MRI revealed that Green suffered a complete tear of his medial collateral ligament (MCL), posterior cruciate ligament (PCL), anterior cruciate ligament (ACL) as well as his meniscus in his right knee.

=== Toronto Argonauts ===
On April 20, 2017, Green was traded to the Toronto Argonauts in exchange for a sixth-round selection in the 2017 CFL draft and a conditional pick in the 2018 draft. In the third week of the season Green set a new career high for yards in game, when Green caught 10 passes for 210 yards. Green had an outstanding 2017 season, setting new career highs in receptions (104) and yards (1,462): Green was named a CFL All-Star for the third time in his career. Green won his third Grey Cup championship in his first year with the Argonauts, defeating the Calgary Stampeders in the 105th Grey Cup 27-24. Green had 3 receptions for a total of 56 yards in the game. Less than a week after starting quarterback Ricky Ray announced Green would be returning for one final season Green and the Argos agreed to a two-year contract extension on February 5, 2018. Green reached the 1000-yard mark in receiving in both 2018 and 2019 on struggling Argonauts squads and was named an East Division All-Star in both years. As a pending free agent in 2020, Green requested and was granted his release during the free agency negotiation window on February 7, 2020.

=== Tampa Bay Vipers ===
Green was signed to a contract with the XFL on February 17, 2020. Initially claimed by the Seattle Dragons, the Dragons traded his rights to the Tampa Bay Vipers in exchange for Korey Toomer. He had his contract terminated when the league suspended operations on April 10, 2020.

=== Retirement ===
On October 21, 2022, S.J. Green signed a one-day contract to retire as a member of the Montreal Alouettes with whom he had played 10 seasons. Green was announced as a member of the Canadian Football Hall of Fame 2024 class on May 3, 2024.

== Personal life ==
Green is a father of two kids and is married to Danielle Green. Green is the eldest of five brothers.
