= Jamel Richardson =

American gridiron football player (born 1982)

No. 18
- Position: Slotback

Personal information
- Born: January 22, 1982 (age 44); Syracuse, New York, U.S.
- Listed height: 6 ft 3 in (1.91 m)
- Listed weight: 226 lb (103 kg)

Career information
- High school: Corcoran
- College: Victor Valley College

Career history
- 2003–2006: Saskatchewan Roughriders
- 2007: Dallas Cowboys*
- 2008–2013: Montreal Alouettes
- 2015: Saskatchewan Roughriders
- * Offseason or practice squad member only

Awards and highlights
- 2× Grey Cup champion (2009, 2010); Grey Cup MVP (2010); 2× CFL All-Star (2008, 2011); 4× CFL East All-Star (2008–2011)
- Stats at CFL.ca (archive)

Jamel Richardson (born January 22, 1982) is an American former professional football player who was a slotback in the Canadian Football League (CFL). He won two Grey Cup championships with the Montreal Alouettes, and was named the Grey Cup Most Valuable Player (MVP) of the 98th Grey Cup. Richardson attended Corcoran High School before he was a two-year All-Foothill Conference in Basketball and All-American in Football at Victor Valley College where he led the state in receptions and yardage.

== Early life ==
Richardson attended Corcoran High School where he played football. In 2011 he was inducted into the Corcoran High school athletic hall of fame.

== Professional career ==
=== Saskatchewan Roughriders ===
Richardson played for four seasons, from 2003–2006, for the Saskatchewan Roughriders. Over that span of time he caught 113 passes for 1471 yards and scored 4 touchdowns.

=== Dallas Cowboys ===
Richardson was signed by the Dallas Cowboys of the National Football League in March 2007, but he faced an uphill battle at making the Cowboys' roster due to the depth Dallas had at the wide receiver position. On August 27, 2007, the Dallas Cowboys waived Richardson, along with seven other players, as part of its roster cuts prior to the start of the 2007 regular season.

=== Montreal Alouettes ===
On March 18, 2008, the Montreal Alouettes signed Richardson. In the 2008 season, Richardson was named a CFL All-Star after leading the CFL with 16 TD receptions while catching 98 passes for 1287 yards.

Richardson made news on January 7, 2009, when it was reported that he turned down an offer from the Minnesota Vikings of the NFL and chose to remain with the Alouettes for at least 3 seasons. He also drew interest from Seattle, San Francisco, and Tampa Bay.

On November 28, 2010 in the 98th Grey Cup in Edmonton, Alberta vs. the Saskatchewan Roughriders, Richardson helped the Alouettes to a 21-18 victory as well as receiving the MVP trophy. He was the first receiver to receive this honour since 2003. For six consecutive seasons Richardson amassed over 1,000 receiving yards; from 2008 through the 2012 CFL season. On August 4, 2013, partway through the season, Richardson tore his LCL and ACL, in his left knee, during practice. He then missed the remainder of the 2013 CFL season. Following the season-ending injury, Richardson was part of the team's final cuts of 2014 training camp and was released on June 21, 2014.

=== Saskatchewan Roughriders (II) ===
After sitting out the regular season in 2014, Richardson signed with the Saskatchewan Roughriders on December 22, 2014.

== Statistics ==
| Receiving | | Regular season | | | | | | Playoffs |
| Year | Team | Games | No. | Yards | Avg | Long | TD | Games | No. | Yards | Avg | Long | TD |
|---|---|---|---|---|---|---|---|---|---|---|---|---|---|
| 2003 | SSK | 6 | 22 | 328 | 14.9 | 35 | 1 | 2 | 2 | 38 | 19.0 | 25 | 0 |
| 2004 | SSK | 6 | 20 | 210 | 10.5 | 35 | 1 | 0 | 0 | 0 | 0.0 | 0 | 0 |
| 2005 | SSK | 14 | 55 | 663 | 12.1 | 42 | 0 | 1 | 6 | 49 | 8.2 | 12 | 1 |
| 2006 | SSK | 4 | 16 | 270 | 16.9 | 49 | 2 | 0 | 0 | 0 | 0.0 | 0 | 0 |
| 2007 | DAL | 0 | 0 | 0 | 0.0 | 0 | 0 | 0 | 0 | 0 | 0.0 | 0 | 0 |
| 2008 | MTL | 18 | 98 | 1,287 | 13.1 | 81 | 16 | 2 | 12 | 214 | 17.8 | 55 | 1 |
| 2009 | MTL | 16 | 85 | 1,055 | 12.4 | 63 | 9 | 2 | 13 | 178 | 13.7 | 23 | 3 |
| 2010 | MTL | 17 | 97 | 1,271 | 13.1 | 61 | 7 | 2 | 13 | 262 | 20.2 | 53 | 2 |
| 2011 | MTL | 17 | 112 | 1,777 | 15.9 | 59 | 11 | 1 | 4 | 95 | 23.7 | 41 | 1 |
| 2012 | MTL | 15 | 62 | 1,011 | 16.3 | 75 | 5 | 1 | 3 | 78 | 26 | 45 | 0 |
| 2013 | MTL | 5 | 18 | 197 | 10.9 | 21 | 0 | Placed on injured list |
| 2014 | | Did Not Play |
| 2015 | SSK | 6 | 19 | 266 | 14.0 | 49 | 0 |
| CFL totals | | 109 | 604 | 8,335 | 13.8 | 81 | 52 | 11 | 53 | 914 | 17.2 | 55 | 8 |
