= Glenn MacKay =

Canadian gridiron football player (born 1984)

No. 8
- Position: Wide receiver

Personal information
- Born: August 27, 1984 (age 42); Burlington, Ontario, Canada
- Listed height: 5 ft 11 in (1.80 m)
- Listed weight: 175 lb (79 kg)

Career information
- University: Windsor
- CFL draft: 2009: undrafted

Career history
- 2009: Montreal Alouettes
- 2010–2011: Hamilton Tiger-Cats
- 2012: Edmonton Eskimos
- 2013: Hamilton Tiger-Cats
- 2014– ?: Berlin Adler
- Stats at CFL.ca

Glenn MacKay (born August 27, 1984) is a professional Canadian football wide receiver. He signed as an undrafted free agent with the Montreal Alouettes in 2009 before signing with Hamilton on June 15, 2010. He has also played for the Edmonton Eskimos. He played CIS football for the Windsor Lancers.
