= Skip Seagraves =

American gridiron football player (born 1982)

Skip Seagreaves
Profile
- Position: Offensive tackle

Personal information
- Born: April 27, 1982 (age 44); West Point, New York, U.S.
- Listed height: 6 ft 5 in (1.96 m)
- Listed weight: 300 lb (136 kg)

Career information
- High school: Walter M. Williams (Burlington, North Carolina)
- College: North Carolina
- NFL draft: 2005: undrafted

Career history
- 2006–2010: Montreal Alouettes

Awards and highlights
- Grey Cup champion (2010)
- Stats at CFL.ca

Skip Seagreaves (born April 27, 1982) is an American former professional football offensive tackle for the Montreal Alouettes of the Canadian Football League (CFL). He was signed by the Alouettes as an undrafted free agent in 2006. He played college football at North Carolina.
