= Martin Bédard =

Canadian football player (born 1984)

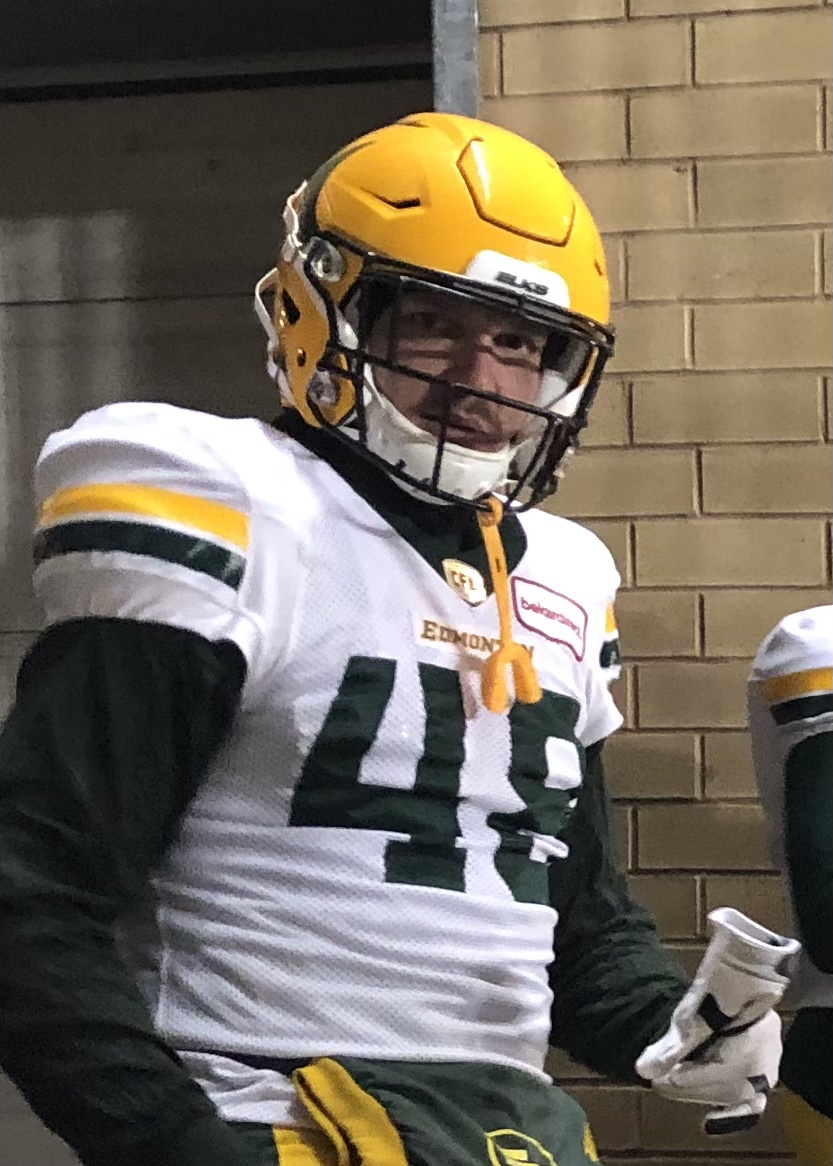
- Bédard with the Edmonton Elks in 2021

No. 48, 37
- Positions: Long snapper, Fullback

Personal information
- Born: March 23, 1984 (age 42); Laval, Quebec, Canada
- Listed height: 6 ft 4 in (1.93 m)
- Listed weight: 239 lb (108 kg)

Career information
- College: Connecticut
- CFL draft: 2009: 2nd round, 14th overall pick

Career history
- 2009–2020: Montreal Alouettes
- 2021: Edmonton Elks

Awards and highlights
- 2× Grey Cup champion (2009, 2010)
- Stats at CFL.ca

Martin Bédard (born March 23, 1984) is a Canadian former professional football long snapper who played in the Canadian Football League (CFL). He played for 11 seasons and 179 games for the Montreal Alouettes, and six games for the Edmonton Elks. He is a two-time Grey Cup champion having won in 2009 and 2010.

== College career ==
Bédard played college football for the UConn Huskies.

== Professional career ==
Bédard was drafted by the Montreal Alouettes in the second round of the 2009 CFL draft.

On February 4, 2019, Bédard signed a contract extension with Montreal. He played in 16 regular season games in 2019 as the team's longsnapper and won the Jake Gaudaur Veterans' Trophy that year. He did not play in 2020 due to the cancellation of the 2020 CFL season.

On July 1, 2021, Bédard announced his retirement from professional football. However, he came out of retirement later that year when it was announced on October 11, 2021 that he had signed with the Edmonton Elks. He played in six games for the Elks in 2021 and was released on December 28, 2021.
