= Jon Banks (Canadian football) =

American football player (born 1984)

No. 10, 1
- Position: Linebacker

Personal information
- Born: April 11, 1984 (age 42); East Moline, Illinois, U.S.
- Listed height: 6 ft 2 in (1.88 m)
- Listed weight: 232 lb (105 kg)

Career information
- High school: United Township (East Moline)
- College: Iowa Central (2003–2004); Iowa State (2005–2007)
- NFL draft: 2008: undrafted

Career history
- Buffalo Bills (2008)*; Montreal Alouettes (2009–2010)
- * Offseason or practice squad member only

Awards and highlights
- 2× Grey Cup champion (2009, 2010)

Career CFL statistics
- Games played: 11
- Tackles: 22
- Sacks: 1
- Interceptions: 1
- Stats at CFL.ca

Jon Banks (born April 11, 1984) is an American former professional football linebacker who played in the Canadian Football League (CFL) with the Montreal Alouettes. He played college football for the Iowa Central Tritons and Iowa State Cyclones. Banks also had stint with the Buffalo Bills of the National Football League (NFL).

== Early life ==
Banks was born on April 11, 1984, in East Moline, Illinois. He attended United Township High School in East Moline.

== College career ==
Banks attended Black Hawk College for two classes during the fall 2002 semester. He sat out the spring 2003 semester. He then enrolled at Iowa Central Community College to play college football for the Tritons. Banks redshirted the 2003 season and earned All-Region honors in 2004.

Banks transferred to play for the Iowa State Cyclones from 2005 to 2007. He played in 32 games across three seasons. At Iowa State, he made 186 tackles, including 11 for loss, one interception, six pass deflections and one forced fumble. Banks was an All-Big 12 honorable mention in 2006.

== Professional career ==
=== Buffalo Bills ===
After going undrafted in the 2008 NFL draft, Banks signed with the Buffalo Bills of the National Football League (NFL) as an undrafted free agent. On August 30, he was released by the team.

=== Montreal Alouettes ===
On September 19, 2009, Banks signed with the Montreal Alouettes of the Canadian Football League (CFL). He made eight tackles and had one interception in two games. Banks spent the rest of the season on the practice roster as the Alouettes won the Grey Cup. In 2010, he dressed in nine games and had 14 tackles and one sack. Banks won another Grey Cup whilst on the injured list. He became a free agent at the end of the season and retired from professional football.
