= Damon Duval =

American gridiron football player (born 1980)

Damon J Duval
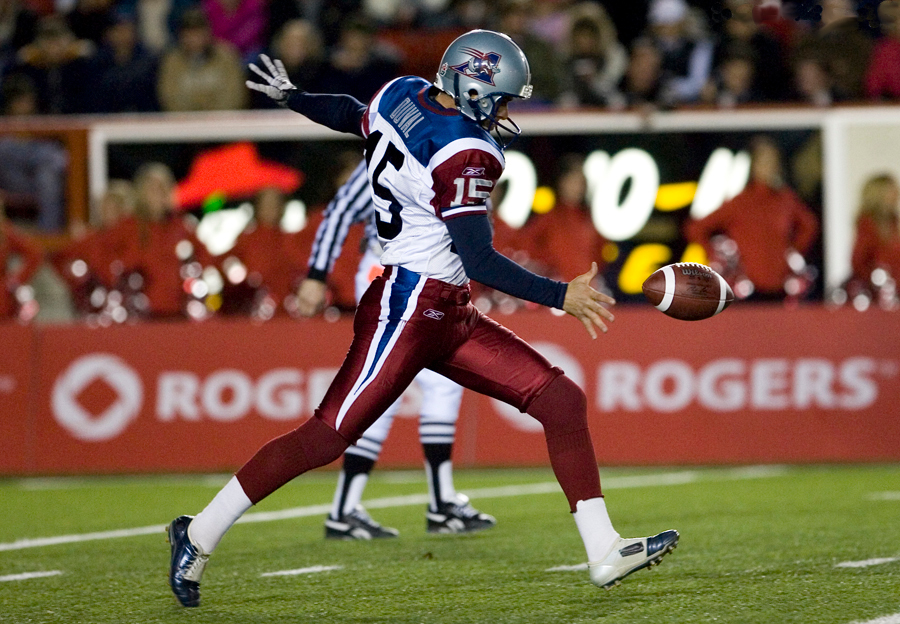
- Duval with the Montreal Alouettes in 2007

No. 15
- Positions: Kicker, Punter

Personal information
- Born: April 3, 1980 (age 46); Morgan City, Louisiana, U.S.
- Listed height: 6 ft 0 in (1.83 m)
- Listed weight: 197 lb (89 kg)

Career information
- High school: Chattanooga Central
- College: Auburn

Career history
- 2003: Jacksonville Jaguars*
- 2003: Atlanta Falcons
- 2005–2010: Montreal Alouettes
- 2011: Edmonton Eskimos
- * Offseason or practice squad member only

Awards and highlights
- 2× Grey Cup champion (2009, 2010); CFL All-Star (2007); 4× CFL East All-Star (2006, 2007, 2008, 2010); Consensus All-American (2001); 2× First-team All-SEC (2000, 2001); Second-team All-SEC (2002)
- Stats at CFL.ca (archive)

Damon Duval (born April 3, 1980) is an American former professional football placekicker and punter who played for the Montreal Alouettes and Edmonton Eskimos of the Canadian Football League (CFL). Duval played college football for Auburn University, and was recognized as a consensus All-American.

== Early life ==
Duval was born in Morgan City, Louisiana. Beginning at age 11, he played professional soccer in the United States Indoor Soccer League USISL as a striker for the Chattanooga Express. Not only was he the youngest player ever signed in the USISL, he also was the leading scorer in the seasons he played. Additionally, he was a striker on both the U.S. Olympic Development Team and the U.S. Men's National soccer team. He attended Chattanooga Central High School, class of 1998, in Harrison, Tennessee, and played high school soccer and football for the Chattanooga Central Purple Pounders.

== College career ==
Duval attended Auburn University in Auburn, Alabama, where he played for the Auburn Tigers football team from 1999 to 2002. He is considered one of the best kickers and punters in Auburn football history. During his college career, Duval amassed over 9,000 punting yards for an average of 44 yards per punt. His 60.8 percent field goal completion rate helped Auburn to a 29–19 record during his four seasons with the team, including appearances in the 2000 Citrus Bowl and 2001 Peach Bowl. Memorably, Duval kicked a 44-yard game-winning field goal in the rain against the No. 1 ranked Florida Gators with 10 seconds left in the game in 2001. It was one of three game-winning field goals he made for the Tigers in 2001.

Duval graduated from Auburn as a fifth-year senior with degrees in health promotion and business. During his career, he was selected as a first-team All-Southeastern Conference (SEC) selection as both a kicker and a punter, becoming the first player to ever be named to an All-SEC first team at two different positions. Duval was also recognized as a consensus first-team All-American, having been named to the first teams of the Associated Press, American Football Coaches Association and Walter Camp Foundation as a kicker. He was also a finalist for the Lou Groza Award.

== Professional career ==
Despite being one of the top kickers available in the 2003 NFL draft, Duval was not drafted into the National Football League, but did sign as an undrafted free agent with the NFL's Jacksonville Jaguars. He was waived by Jacksonville on June 19, 2003. He later signed with the Atlanta Falcons on December 30, 2003, before the regular season finale. However, he did not play in any regular season or postseason games for the Falcons. He was waived by Atlanta on August 29, 2004, and subsequently left the NFL to sign with the Montreal Alouettes of the Canadian Football League. Duval made an immediate impact in the CFL, leading the league in scoring his rookie season (2005) with 191 points and proved to be very reliable kicking field goals. His 2005 CFL highlight came in the 93rd Grey Cup when he made a 27-yard field goal with no time left to force overtime. Continuing his 2005 success, Duval led the league in field goal percentage with 86.4% in 2006 which led to his making the 2006 All Star team. He also finished second in kicking points (201), punting average (45.4 yards) and kickoff average (61.1 yards). Duval's strong play helped Montreal reach the 94th Grey Cup by kicking a game sealing field goal in the Division finals. Unfortunately, his team fell short again despite Duval's 43-yard field goal in the second quarter. On November 7, 2009, he set the record for points in the CFL regular season with 242, again with the Montreal Alouettes.

In the 2009 Grey Cup Championship November 29, Duval's field goal from 33 yards out on the game's final play gave the Alouettes a 28–27 win over the Saskatchewan Roughriders, capping a remarkable Montreal comeback. Duval had actually missed a 43-yard field goal attempt on what should have been the last play of the game, but the Roughriders were penalized for having too many men on the field. Duval helped the Alouettes win back-to-back Grey Cups with the team's second straight win in 2010.

After the 2010 season, Duval became a free agent and he signed with the Edmonton Eskimos on June 6, 2011. After spending one season with the Eskimos, he was released on February 1, 2012.

== Personal life ==
Duval was married to Ashley Duval (2006 - 2013), who was named as Celebrate Recovery's Top 50 Most Beautiful Influencers in 2018 through 2026, citing her unique style & fearless promotion of mental health. Faces & Voices of Recovery, recognized Ashley as Trailblazer in Women of Influence 2019. In early 2022, Ashley was featured in Time, Changing the Face of Recovery, featured as one to watch, Gamechanger. Ashley is the sister of former Edmonton Eskimos' receiver Brad Smith and the daughter of former CFL Commissioner and Montreal Alouettes President Larry Smith and Miss Montreal 1968, Leesa MacLean. Damon and Ashley share their two sons, Drew James (20), and Hunter William (18).
