= Mark Estelle =

American gridiron football player (born 1981)

No. 23, 31
- Position: Cornerback

Personal information
- Born: July 29, 1981 (age 45); Compton, California, U.S.
- Listed height: 5 ft 9 in (1.75 m)
- Listed weight: 182 lb (83 kg)

Career information
- College: Utah State

Career history
- Baltimore Ravens (2005)*; Houston Texans (2006)*; → Cologne Centurions (2006); Montreal Alouettes (2006–2011)
- * Offseason or practice squad member only

Awards and highlights
- 2× Grey Cup champion (2009, 2010); 3× CFL East All-Star (2008, 2009, 2010)
- Stats at CFL.ca

Mark Estelle (born July 29, 1981) is an American former professional football defensive back. He played for the Montreal Alouettes of the Canadian Football League from 2006 to 2011. He also played for the Cologne Centurions of NFL Europe.

== Junior college career ==
Estelle attended Los Angeles Southwest College for one year and lettered in football and track & field. In football, he was a first-team All-JUCO selection, unanimously voted into the All-Western State Conference team, and named the Team's Defensive Player of the Year.

== NCAA career ==
Estelle attended Utah State University, and he was a three-year letterwinner in football. As a junior, he made 30 tackles, an interception, a fumble recovery, and 13 pass deflections.

== Professional career ==
In 2005, Estelle attended the Montreal Alouettes and Baltimore Ravens training camps. The following year, he signed with the Houston Texans and was assigned to the Cologne Centurions of NFL Europa where he made 16 tackles, 11 knockdowns, and three forced fumbles. He moved on to the Texans training camp and finally joined the Alouettes in September and played in the final regular season game and started in the Canadian Football League East Division championship and the 93rd Grey Cup. He returned to the Alouettes for the 2007 and 2008 CFL seasons and was named an East Division All-Star in 2008. He was supposed to become a free agent after the 2008 season, but was re-signed by the Alouettes on February 16, 2009. He became a free agent on February 15, 2012.
