= Ivan Brown (Canadian football) =

Canadian football defensive end

No. 97, 91
- Position: Defensive end

Personal information
- Born: July 18, 1985 (age 41); Regina, Saskatchewan, Canada
- Listed height: 6 ft 2 in (1.88 m)
- Listed weight: 240 lb (109 kg)

Career information
- University: Saskatchewan
- CFL draft: 2009: 4th round, 31st overall pick

Career history
- 2009–2010: Montreal Alouettes
- 2011: Hamilton Tiger-Cats
- 2012: Montreal Alouettes*
- 2013–2014: Toronto Argonauts
- 2015: Winnipeg Blue Bombers
- 2016–2017: Saskatchewan Roughriders
- * Offseason or practice squad member only

Awards and highlights
- Grey Cup champion (2010)
- Stats at CFL.ca

Ivan Brown (born July 18, 1985) is a Canadian former professional football defensive end. He was drafted by the Montreal Alouettes in the fourth round of the 2009 CFL draft. He was also a member of the Hamilton Tiger-Cats, Toronto Argonauts, Winnipeg Blue Bombers and Saskatchewan Roughriders. He played CIS football for the Saskatchewan Huskies.
