= Dylan Steenbergen =

Canadian football player

No. 62
- Position: Offensive lineman

Personal information
- Born: July 24, 1987 (age 39); Lethbridge, Alberta, Canada
- Listed height: 6 ft 5 in (1.96 m)
- Listed weight: 297 lb (135 kg)

Career information
- High school: Winston Churchill
- University: Calgary
- CFL draft: 2009: 1st round, 7th overall pick

Career history
- 2009–2011: Montreal Alouettes
- 2011–2012: Edmonton Eskimos

Awards and highlights
- 2× Grey Cup champion (2009, 2010)
- Stats at CFL.ca

Dylan Steenbergen (born July 24, 1987) is a Canadian former professional football offensive lineman who played for the Montreal Alouettes and Edmonton Eskimos of the Canadian Football League (CFL).

He was drafted by the Montreal Alouettes in the first round of the 2009 CFL draft with the seventh overall pick. He played CIS football for the Calgary Dinos.
