= Nickolas Morin-Soucy =

Canadian football player (born 1984)

No. 88
- Position: Defensive tackle

Personal information
- Born: May 13, 1984 (age 42); Gaspé, Quebec, Canada
- Listed height: 6 ft 2 in (1.88 m)
- Listed weight: 250 lb (113 kg)

Career information
- College: Montreal
- CFL draft: 2009: 3rd round, 23rd overall pick

Career history
- 2009–2010: Montreal Alouettes
- Stats at CFL.ca

Nickolas Morin-Soucy (born May 13, 1984) is a Canadian former professional football defensive tackle for the Montreal Alouettes of the Canadian Football League (CFL). He was drafted by the Alouettes in the third round of the 2009 CFL draft, signed a three-year contract in May and played during the pre-season of the 2009 Montreal Alouettes season but suffered a torn anterior cruciate ligament injury and the Alouettes announced his retirement on June 24, 2009. His name was then placed on an injury unable to perform list, and was reactivate at mid-season of the 2010 season, when he participated in his first professional game with the Als. He played CIS football for the Montreal Carabins.
