= Jerald Brown =

American gridiron football player (born 1980)

No. 35
- Position: Defensive back

Personal information
- Born: December 3, 1980 (age 45); Washington, D.C., U.S.
- Listed height: 5 ft 11 in (1.80 m)
- Listed weight: 185 lb (84 kg)

Career information
- College: Glenville State

Career history
- 2004: New York Dragons
- 2005: Arizona Rattlers
- 2006–2007: Columbus Destroyers
- 2008: Kansas City Brigade
- 2009–2015: Montreal Alouettes
- 2016: Toronto Argonauts

Awards and highlights
- 2× Grey Cup champion (2009, 2010); AFL Defensive Player of the Year (2006); CFL All-Star (2013); 3× CFL East All-Star (2010, 2013, 2014); First-team All-Arena (2006)
- Stats at CFL.ca (archive)
- Stats at ArenaFan.com

Jerald Brown (born December 3, 1980) is an American former professional football defensive back. He played college football at Glenville State College. Brown played for the New York Dragons, Arizona Rattlers, Columbus Destroyers, and Kansas City Brigade of the Arena Football League (AFL), as well as the Montreal Alouettes and Toronto Argonauts of the Canadian Football League (CFL).

== Professional career ==
Before playing in the CFL, Brown was a five-year veteran of the Arena Football League, where he played for the New York Dragons, Arizona Rattlers, Columbus Destroyers, and Kansas City Brigade. In the 2006 Arena Football League season, he was named the AFL Defensive Player of the Year when he led the league with 11 interceptions and 133 interception-return yards. In 2009, he signed with the Montreal Alouettes of the Canadian Football League and was a member of both the 97th Grey Cup and 98th Grey Cup championship team with the Montreal Alouettes. In 6 seasons in the CFL, he has recorded 271 tackles, 17 interceptions and 7 fumbles recovery.

On February 26, 2016, Brown signed with the Toronto Argonauts of the Canadian Football League. On May 31, 2016, Brown announced his retirement, but on August 7, 2016, Brown re-signed with the Argonauts as a free agent.
