= Avon Cobourne =

American gridiron football player and coach (born 1979)

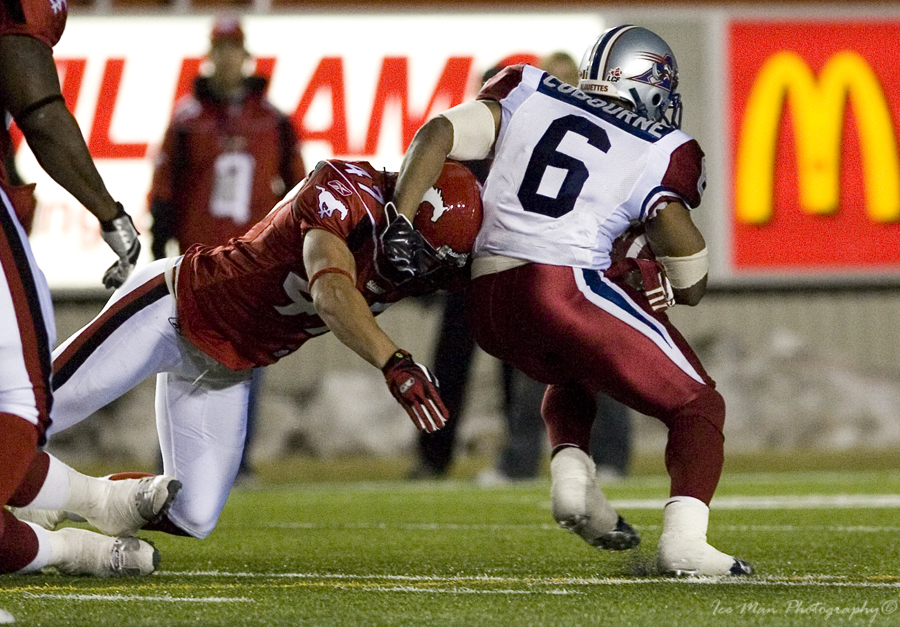
- Cobourne (6) with the Montreal Alouettes in 2007

Profile
- Position: Running back

Personal information
- Born: March 6, 1979 (age 47); Camden, New Jersey, U.S.
- Listed height: 5 ft 8 in (1.73 m)
- Listed weight: 200 lb (91 kg)

Career information
- High school: Holy Cross Academy (Delran Township, NJ)
- College: West Virginia (1999–2002)
- NFL draft: 2003: undrafted

Career history

Playing
- 2003–2004: Detroit Lions
- 2004: Cologne Centurions
- 2005: Miami Dolphins*
- 2006–2010: Montreal Alouettes
- 2011–2012: Hamilton Tiger-Cats
- * Offseason or practice squad member only

Coaching
- 2014–2015: Saskatchewan Roughriders (RB)
- 2016: Winnipeg Blue Bombers (RB)

Awards and highlights
- 2× Grey Cup champion (2009, 2010); Grey Cup Most Valuable Player (2009); CFL All-Star (2009); 3× CFL East All-Star (2008, 2009, 2012); 2x First-team All-Big East (1999, 2002); 2× Second-team All-Big East (2000, 2001); Freshman All-American (1999); Third-team All-American (2002); WVU Sports Hall of Fame (2018); Records: All-time leading rusher at West Virginia (5,164 yards); All-time rushing attempts leader at West Virginia (1,050); Career leader for most games with 100-yards rushing at West Virginia (28)

Career NFL statistics
- Rushing attempts: 10
- Rushing average: 2.7
- Rushing yards: 27
- Stats at Pro Football Reference

Career CFL statistics
- Rushing attempts: 919
- Rushing yards: 4,999
- Rushing touchdowns: 37
- Receiving Yards: 2,519
- Receiving touchdowns: 7
- Stats at CFL.ca (archived)

Avon Cobourne (born March 6, 1979) is an American former professional football player who was a running back in the National Football League (NFL) and Canadian Football League (CFL). He played college football for the West Virginia Mountaineers from 1999 to 2002 before entering the NFL.

Cobourne became the Montreal Alouettes's starting running back in 2008, in which he finished the season with 1,557 all-purpose yards and was named a CFL East Division All-Star. He followed this up with an outstanding 2009 season where he rushed for 1,214 yards and 13 touchdowns, culminating in CFL All-Star recognition and being named the MVP of the 2009 Grey Cup.

== Early life ==
Cobourne grew up in Cherry Hill, New Jersey and attended Holy Cross High School in Delran Township, New Jersey, where he was a letterman in football. In football, he rushed for 1,400 yards and 32 touchdowns as a junior, but suffered an anterior cruciate ligament injury early in his senior season.

== College career ==
=== Freshman season ===
Cobourne entered West Virginia right after Amos Zereoué, the star running back from 1996 to 1998, left early for the NFL. He immediately started the 1999 season. As a freshman, Cobourne ranked 13th in the NCAA in rushing with 1,139 yards first in the Big East, and was the leading freshman rusher in the nation. Cobourne also made 1st-team all-Big East and broke Zereoue's freshman rushing yardage record at West Virginia. Cobourne rushed for 142 yards in only three quarters against Miami (Ohio) and 141 yards against Rutgers. His best performances of the season though came against Virginia Tech, whose defense was ranked #1 in the nation against the run, when he ran for 133 yards; and against Pitt, when he rushed for a then Mountaineer Field record of 210 yards, which was the best single-game performance for a WVU freshman.

=== Sophomore season ===
As a sophomore in 2000, Cobourne was Athlon magazine's third running back in the nation in the preseason. Cobourne again finished in the top 20 in the nation in rushing and earned second-team all-Big East honors. Cobourne only totaled 1,028 yards with 6 touchdowns that season, both lower than his freshman output, but he was plagued by injuries during the season. He rushed for 132 yards and a touchdown against Boston College, 166 yards against Syracuse, and then 117 yards against Rutgers before leaving the game with an irritated hip joint. His best performance was in coach Don Nehlen's final game as the Mountaineers' coach against Ole Miss in the Music City Bowl when he rushed for 125 yards in the win.

=== Junior season ===
Cobourne was a pre-season second-team all-Big East selection. He finished the season 14th in the nation rushing with a career-high 1,298 yards and 9 touchdowns. The season was his third consecutive of gaining over 1,000 yards. Cobourne was also named team MVP and was the only player to rush for over 100 yards against the national champions, the Miami Hurricanes (132). Cobourne started the season out with a 173-yard performance against Ohio, followed by a 181-yard performance against Kent State. He then rushed for 128 yards against Maryland; totaled four touchdowns in two quarters against Rutgers along with 147 yards; and rushed for 169 yards against Notre Dame in South Bend, Indiana, highlighted with a career-long 60-yard run. He then finished the season with four consecutive 100-yard games. He earned second-team all-Big East honors.

=== Senior season ===
Going into Cobourne's senior season, he was a candidate for the 2002 Heisman Trophy Race. Although Cobourne did not win the award, he set a school record of most rushing yards in a season with 1,710 yards. The record was broken in the Mountaineers' 2006 season by Steve Slaton. Cobourne also set a career-high scores with 17 touchdowns. He rushed for 260 yards and 2 touchdowns in a win against ECU early in the season, and then rushed for 175 yards and a score in a loss to Miami. His 260 yards against the Pirates was a career-high.

=== Legacy ===
He ended his career with the all-time Big East Conference and WVU rushing record with 5,164 rushing yards, breaking Zereoue's previous record. In all of his four seasons, Cobourne rushed for over 1,000 yards, including his redshirt-freshman season.

Cobourne, Amos Zereoué, and Steve Slaton are often considered the greatest backs in school history.

=== Career statistics ===
		Rushing					Receiving
Year	Team	G	Att	Yds	Y/G	TD	Rec	Yds	Y/G	TD
1999	West Virginia	10	224	1,138	113.8	10	16	126	12.6	0
2000	West Virginia	9	197	893	99.2	7	5	63	7.0	0
2001	West Virginia	11	267	1,298	118.0	9	23	124	11.3	0
2002*	West Virginia	13	335	1,710	131.5	17	15	146	11.2	0
Career		43	1023	5,039	4.9	42	57	459	7.9	0

(*) indicates bowl stats are included

== Professional career ==
=== National Football League ===
Cobourne was signed by the Detroit Lions in 2003 after being undrafted. He played in seven games, recording seven carries for 27 yards, returning seven kickoffs for 123 yards, and catching four passes for 30 yards. In 2004, Cobourne was moved to the Lions practice squad.

During the 2004 season, Cobourne was allocated to the Cologne Centurions of NFL Europe. He recorded 525 yards on 117 carries in Europe.

Cobourne signed with the Miami Dolphins for the 2005 NFL season, but never played.

=== Canadian Football League ===
==== 2006 season ====
Cobourne then left the National Football League for the Canadian Football League's Montreal Alouettes. Through Cobourne's first season, he totaled 21 yards on seven attempts and punt return 3 fumbles. He also totaled 14 yards on two catches and led the team on special teams tackles with 21. Cobourne also had the league's longest missed field goal return at 95 yards.

==== 2007 season ====
In his second year for the Alouettes, 2007, Cobourne played backup to Jarrett Payton, the son of NFL legend Walter Payton. While also playing linebacker, Cobourne became one of the league's most feared returners during an exhibition game against the Toronto Argonauts. With five seconds left before halftime, and the score 11-7 Toronto, Cobourne returned a missed field goal for a 111-yard touchdown to make the score 14-11 Montreal at halftime. The play was featured on ESPN's SportsCenter as the "Teamwork Play of the Week". However, shortly after, Cobourne suffered an ankle injury that took him out for one game. The next game after the injury, he rushed for 33 yards on seven attempts while backing up former college rival Payton (who played at Miami; versus Cobourne's WVU). Cobourne finished third on the team in special teams tackles and rushed for 160 yards and 2 touchdowns on the season. After the 2007 season, Cobourne signed an extension with the Alouettes in January 2008.

==== 2008 season ====
In 2008, after taking the job from former starting running back Jarrett Payton during the preseason, Cobourne started the first game of the season against the Hamilton Tiger Cats. Cobourne rushed for 107 yards and one touchdown on 12 attempts and caught 6 passes for 55 yards. Week 2 against Winnipeg, Cobourne rushed for 89 yards and one touchdown on 17 carries and caught 10 passes for 96 yards. After these 2 performances, the Alouettes decided to name Cobourne the starter for the rest of the season and cut Jarrett Payton. In the following game against Calgary, he rushed for 23 yards on 5 carries and had 66 yards from 5 receptions. In the following loss to Saskatchewan, Cobourne rushed 4 times for 6 yards and had 7 receptions for 83 yards and a touchdown.

Cobourne then rushed for 127 yards on 14 carries and had two receptions for 14 yards in a loss to B.C. However, as Montreal defeated Hamilton, Cobourne rushed for 119 yards and a touchdown on 17 carries and had 4 receptions for 21 yards. He then led Montreal past Winnipeg with 21 carries for 137 yards and a touchdown and 25 yards off of 7 receptions. As Montreal then defeated Toronto, Cobounre posted his fourth-straight 100-yard rushing game with a 107-yard performance off of 16 carries. He also led the team with 5 receptions for 103 yards and a touchdown, totaling 210 yards of offense.

Montreal then defeated B.C., as Cobourne rushed 16 times for 100 yards and a touchdown - his fifth consecutive 100-yard rushing performance. Cobourne missed the following games against Toronto, Calgary, and Edmonton with an injury. However, he continued his 100-yard rushing streak within the Saskatchewan game, rushing 17 times for 125 yards and a touchdown. Cobourne's 100-yard rushing game streak ended at six consecutive games, as he only rushed for 10 yards off of 6 carries against Hamilton, but did have 10 receptions for 83 yards. Cobourne had no carries in the following game against Hamilton, but had 3 receptions for 29 yards.

Cobourne missed the following Toronto victory, the 24-23 Winnipeg loss, and the loss to Edmonton. However, Cobourne was active for the Grey Cup Playoff Finals matchup.

The first half of the season saw Cobourne leading the league in rushing with 715 yards and, when combined with his 463 yards receiving, put him on a record pace to become the first player in league history to register 1,000 yards rushing and receiving in the same season. However, due to injury, Cobourne finished the regular season with 145 carries for 950 yards with six touchdowns and 64 receptions for 607 yards for two touchdowns. Cobourne was named an East Division All-Star at running back while his rushing yards was third in the CFL, his receiving yards were 24th in the CFL, and his 1,557 yards from scrimmage was third in the CFL.

==== 2009 season ====
Cobourne opened up his second season as the full-time starting back for Montreal with a 19 carry, 107 yard performance with a touchdown against Calgary. Then against Edmonton, Cobourne rushed for 65 yards and a touchdown on 10 carries. Then against the Saskatchewan Roughriders, Cobourne produced a career-high 146 rushing yards and two touchdowns on 25 carries. In the next four games, Cobourne totaled 216 yards rushing with three touchdowns and 146 receiving yards. In the next game against Saskatchewan, Cobourne rushed for 101 yards on 19 carries and 20 receiving yards and a touchdown. Against the BC Lions in the next game, he totaled 122 total yards of offense. In the final game of September against Hamilton, Cobourne rushed for a career-high 193 yards and two touchdowns with 46 yards receiving. He won the Most Valuable Player award in the 97th Grey Cup when the Montreal Alouettes defeated the Saskatchewan Roughriders 28–27 on November 29, 2009.

==== 2011 season ====
On February 16, 2011, Avon Cobourne signed as a free agent with the Hamilton Tiger-Cats. He started 17 regular season games at running back as well as two playoff games for the Tiger-Cats. He was released by Hamilton on February 1, 2012, after the team had signed Martell Mallett.

==== 2012 season ====
After Martell Mallett suffered a torn achilles tendon, the Tiger-Cats elected to re-sign Cobourne for the 2012 season. Cobourne would go on to be named a CFL East Division All-Star for the third time of his career.

On February 16, 2013, Cobourne was released by the Tiger-Cats.

== Coaching career ==
=== 2014 season ===
Running backs coach for Saskatchewan Roughriders.

=== 2016 season ===
Running backs coach for Winnipeg Blue Bombers. In early April 2017 Cobourne and the Bombers mutually parted ways.

== Pre-Game Enterprises ==
Cobourne has a degree in marketing from West Virginia University. In the off-season, he is a businessman, operating and acting as president of Pre-Game Enterprises, a sporting goods company based out of Charleston, West Virginia. For now, the company is selling T-shirts, caps, and mouthpieces with Cobourne's signature slogan, Chill Son, in the shape of a football. During the season, the company is run by his wife, Rebecca.
