= J.P. Bekasiak =

Canadian football player (born 1982)

No. 96
- Position: Defensive tackle

Personal information
- Born: January 1, 1982 (age 44); Edmonton, Alberta, Canada
- Listed height: 6 ft 6 in (1.98 m)
- Listed weight: 300 lb (136 kg)

Career information
- College: Toledo
- CFL draft: 2007: 1st round, 4th overall pick

Career history
- 2007–2008: Hamilton Tiger-Cats
- 2009–2012: Montreal Alouettes

Awards and highlights
- Grey Cup champion (2010)
- Stats at CFL.ca (archive)

J.P. Bekasiak (born January 1, 1982) is a Canadian former professional football defensive tackle who played in the Canadian Football League (CFL). He was drafted as the fourth overall pick in the 2007 CFL draft by the Hamilton Tiger-Cats. He played college football with the Toledo Rockets.
