= Emmanuel Marc =

American gridiron football player (born 1982)

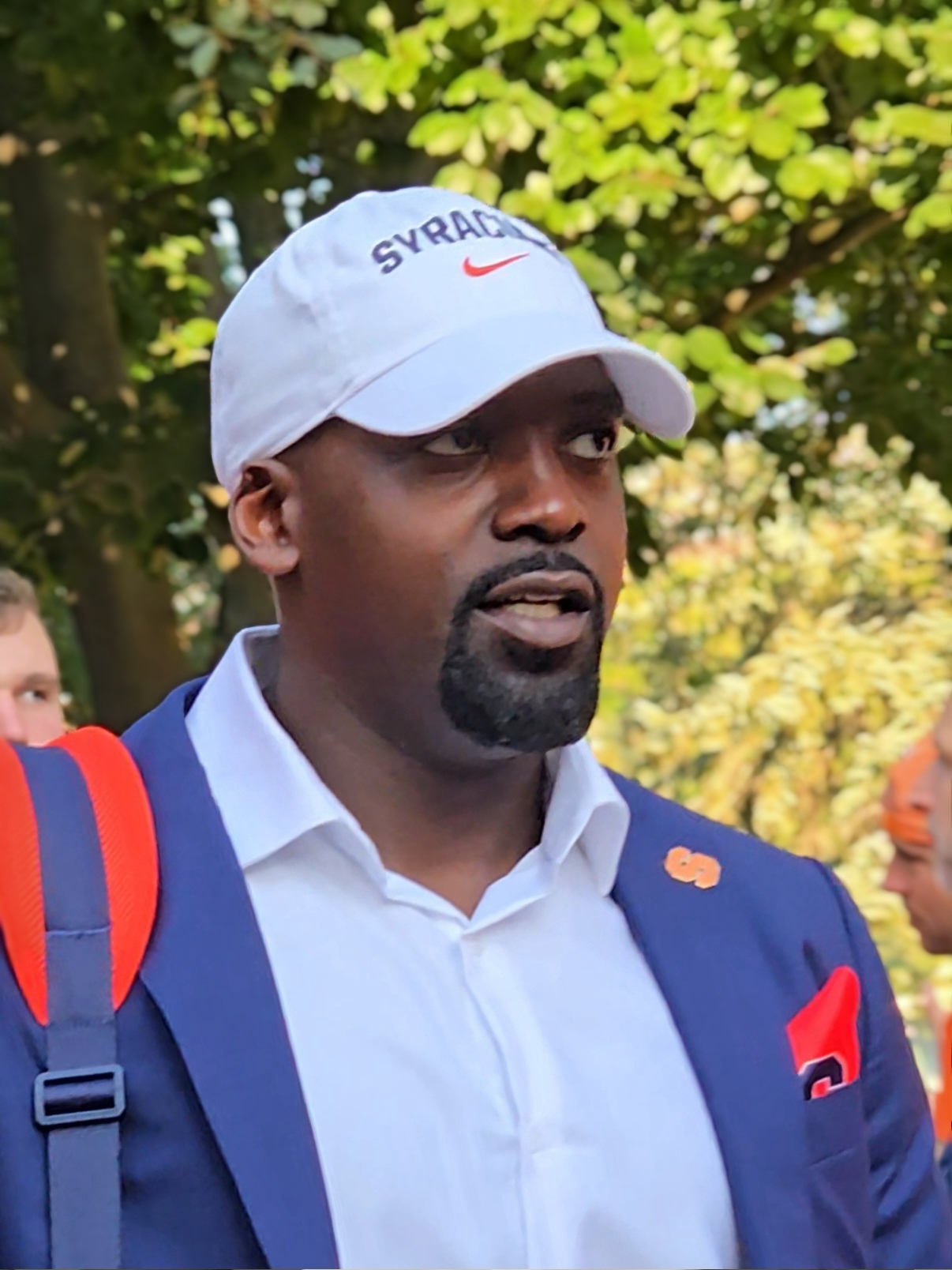
- Marc with the Syracuse Orange in 2024

Current position
- Title: Quality control coach
- Team: Syracuse
- Conference: ACC

Biographical details
- Born: November 17, 1982 (age 43); Spring Valley, New York, U.S.

Playing career
- 2003–2005: Hudson Valley CC
- 2005–2007: Delaware State
- 2008–2009: BC Lions
- 2010: Winnipeg Blue Bombers
- 2010–2011: Montreal Alouettes
- 2012–2012: Toronto Argonauts
- Position: Running back

Coaching career (HC unless noted)
- 2024–present: Syracuse (QC)

Emmanuel Marc (born November 17, 1982) is a former professional Canadian football running back in the Canadian Football League (CFL).

Marc was signed in February, 2010 by Winnipeg Blue Bombers and was a late cut in training camp. He then signed with the Montreal Alouettes. He was released by the Alouettes on May 7, 2012. On October 5, 2012, Marc was signed by the Toronto Argonauts, but was released by the team on November 10, 2012. He was also a member of the BC Lions in 2009. He played college football for the Delaware State Hornets.
