= Gavin Walls =

American gridiron football player (born 1980)

No. 98
- Position: Defensive end

Personal information
- Born: January 29, 1980 (age 46); Ripley, Mississippi, U.S.
- Listed height: 6 ft 2 in (1.88 m)
- Listed weight: 231 lb (105 kg)

Career information
- College: Arkansas

Career history
- 2004: Minnesota Vikings
- 2004: Scottish Claymores
- 2005–2010: Winnipeg Blue Bombers
- 2010–2011: Montreal Alouettes

Awards and highlights
- CFL Rookie of the Year (2005); Jackie Parker Trophy (2005); 2× CFL East All-Star (2006, 2008); CFL West All-Star (2005)
- Stats at CFL.ca

Gavin Walls (born January 29, 1980) is an American former professional football player who played for the Winnipeg Blue Bombers of the Canadian Football League (CFL).

A defensive end, Walls played college football at the University of Arkansas. Following college, he attended training camp with the Minnesota Vikings of the National Football League (NFL), but was cut before the regular season. In 2004, he was drafted in the fifth round of the NFL Europe draft by the Scottish Claymores.

In February 2005, Walls signed with the Blue Bombers and ended up having one of the most successful rookie seasons in team history. He led the team in quarterback sacks with 12, second best that season in the CFL, and was named CFL Rookie of the Year following the 2005 season. He was recognized as CFL Lineman of the Week four times during the season and was selected as a CFL West Division All-Star and a CFLPA All-Star for the season. During the season, he scored two touchdowns, unusual for a defensive lineman.

Walls's second season saw a similar level of performance, registering eleven quarterback sacks and earning honours as a CFL East Division All-Star in 2006.

In 2007, Walls played a substantial role in leading the Blue Bombers to the 95th Grey Cup, which they lost to the Saskatchewan Roughriders, 23–19.

Walls was signed to a new contract by the Blue and Gold heading into the 2009 season. He is regarded as the best in the league at the strong-side defensive end position, and his new contract reflects that.

On February 26, 2010, Gavin was traded to the Montreal Alouettes in exchange for non-import defensive end Stan Van Sichem.

Gavin is working with troubled youth to make his adopted city of Winnipeg a better place to live. He is currently the Project Manager at Clearview Co-op in Steinbach, Manitoba.
