= Doug Goldsby =

Canadian football player (born 1986)

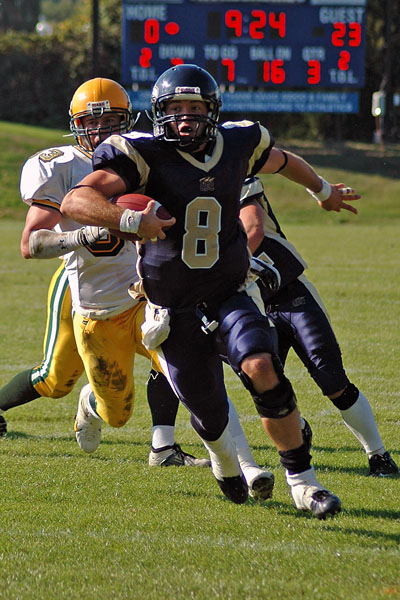
- Goldsby playing quarterback for the UBC Thunderbirds against the Alberta Golden Bears in 2007

No. 38
- Position: Safety

Personal information
- Born: December 23, 1986 (age 39); Sacramento, California, U.S.
- Listed height: 6 ft 2 in (1.88 m)
- Listed weight: 220 lb (100 kg)

Career information
- University: University of British Columbia
- CFL draft: 2009: undrafted

Career history
- 2009: Montreal Alouettes
- 2010: BC Lions

Awards and highlights
- Grey Cup champion (2009)
- Stats at CFL.ca (archive)

Doug Goldsby (born December 23, 1986) is a Canadian former professional football safety who played in the Canadian Football League. He was signed by the Montreal Alouettes as an undrafted free agent in 2009, where he spent a season before being picked up by the BC Lions in 2010. He played CIS football for the UBC Thunderbirds.
