= Eric Wilson (Canadian football) =

American gridiron football player (born 1978)

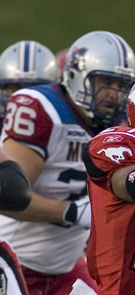
- Wilson in 2007

No. 36
- Position: Defensive tackle

Personal information
- Born: January 30, 1978 (age 48); Monroe, Michigan, U.S.
- Listed height: 6 ft 4 in (1.93 m)
- Listed weight: 300 lb (136 kg)

Career information
- College: Michigan
- NFL draft: 2001: undrafted

Career history
- Detroit Lions (2001)*; Winnipeg Blue Bombers (2002–2003); Miami Dolphins (2004–2005); → Hamburg Sea Devils (2005); Winnipeg Blue Bombers (2006); Saskatchewan Roughriders (2007)*; Montreal Alouettes (2007–2011)
- * Offseason or practice squad member only

Awards and highlights
- 2× Grey Cup champion (2009, 2010)
- Stats at CFL.ca (archive)

Eric Wilson (born January 30, 1978) is an American former professional football player. He played college football as a defensive lineman at the University of Michigan from 1997 to 2000. He played professional football in the Canadian Football League, principally as a defensive tackle, for the Winnipeg Blue Bombers from 2002 to 2003 and 2006 and the Montreal Alouettes from 2007 to 2011. He won two Grey Cup championships with the Alouettes.

== Early life ==
Wilson was born in 1978, grew up in Monroe, Michigan, and attended Monroe High School. He graduated in 1996.

== University of Michigan ==
Wilson enrolled at the University of Michigan in 1996 and played college football for the Michigan Wolverines football teams from 1997 to 2000. After redshirting in 1996, Wilson appeared in eight games, none as a starter, for the undefeated 1997 Michigan Wolverines football team that finished the season ranked #1 in the final AP Poll. He started two games at defensive tackle in 1998 and seven in 1999. As a senior, he was a co-captain of the 2000 Michigan team and started five games at nose tackle. In four years at Michigan, Wilson recorded 78 tackles, two pass breakups, and three fumble recoveries.

== Professional football ==
In April 2001, Wilson was signed by the Detroit Lions as an undrafted free agent in 2001. In 2002, Wilson signed with the Winnipeg Blue Bombers of the Canadian Football League (CFL). He played for the Blue Bombers as a defensive tackle from 2002 to 2003, spent two years with the Miami Dolphins in 2004 and 2005, and returned to Winnipeg in 2006. In 2007, Wilson was signed as a free agent by the Montreal Alouettes. He played five seasons for the Alouettes, playing on both offense and defense, from 2007 to 2011 and helped the team win consecutive Grey Cup championships in 2009 and 2010. He announced his retirement from football in May 2012.

== Family and later years ==
Wilson is married, and he and his wife Janessa have a daughter, Kayliana, and a son, Ty. He lives in New York State.
