= Jeff Robertshaw =

Canadian football player (born 1983)

No. 72
- Position: Defensive end

Personal information
- Born: March 27, 1983 (age 43); Hamilton, Ontario, Canada
- Listed height: 6 ft 3 in (1.91 m)
- Listed weight: 260 lb (118 kg)

Career information
- College: McMaster

Career history
- Hamilton Tiger-Cats (2007)*; Montreal Alouettes (2007–2011)
- * Offseason or practice squad member only

Awards and highlights
- Grey Cup champion (2009)
- Stats at CFL.ca (archive)

Jeff Robertshaw (born March 27, 1983) is a Canadian former professional football defensive end. He was signed as an undrafted free agent by the Hamilton Tiger-Cats in 2007. He played college football at McMaster. After his playing career, he became a teacher at Columbia International College in Hamilton, Ontario. Although he is now a free agent, he still relates to football by coaching and playing with his friends.
