= Stan Van Sichem =

Canadian football player (born 1987)

No. 14
- Position: Defensive lineman

Personal information
- Born: April 2, 1987 (age 39); Amsterdam, Netherlands
- Listed height: 6 ft 2 in (1.88 m)
- Listed weight: 229 lb (104 kg)

Career information
- University: Regina
- CFL draft: 2009: 4th round, 25th overall pick

Career history
- 2009: Montreal Alouettes
- 2010: Winnipeg Blue Bombers
- Stats at CFL.ca

Stan Van Sichem (born April 2, 1987) is a former professional Canadian football defensive lineman. He was drafted by the Montreal Alouettes in the fourth round of the 2009 CFL draft. He played CIS football for the Regina Rams. On February 26, 2010 Stan was traded to the Winnipeg Blue Bombers in exchange for import defensive end Gavin Walls.
