= 98th Grey Cup =

2010 Canadian Football championship game

Montreal Alouettes	Saskatchewan Roughriders
(12–6)	(10–8)
21	18
Head coach: Marc Trestman	Head coach: Ken Miller
	1	2	3	4	Total
Montreal Alouettes	8	0	3	10	21
Saskatchewan Roughriders	7	4	0	7	18
- Date: November 28, 2010
- Stadium: Commonwealth Stadium
- Location: Edmonton
- Most Valuable Player: Jamel Richardson, SB (Alouettes)
- Most Valuable Canadian: Keith Shologan, DT (Roughriders)
- National anthem: The Trews
- Coin toss: Lt-Gov. Donald Ethell
- Referee: Bud Steen
- Halftime show: Bachman & Turner
- Attendance: 63,317

Broadcasters
- Network: English: TSN/TSN HD; French: RDS/RDS HD
- Announcers: (TSN): Chris Cuthbert, Glen Suitor, Dave Randorf, Jock Climie, Matt Dunigan, Chris Schultz (RDS): Denis Casavant, Pierre Vercheval, Marc Labrecque, Mike Sutherland, Claude Mailhot
- Ratings: 6.04 million

The 98th Grey Cup was a Canadian football game played between the East Division champion Montreal Alouettes and West Division champion Saskatchewan Roughriders to decide the champion of the Canadian Football League (CFL) for the 2010 season. In a rematch of the 97th Grey Cup, the Alouettes defeated the Roughriders for the second year in a row, 21–18, becoming the first team in 13 years to win back-to-back Grey Cups.

The game was played on November 28, 2010, at Commonwealth Stadium in Edmonton, Alberta. This marked the first time that the Grey Cup was played in the province of Alberta in two straight years. (Calgary hosted the previous Grey Cup game.)

Alouettes quarterback Anthony Calvillo won his third Grey Cup, completing 29 of 42 pass attempts for 335 yards passing. Montreal wide receiver Jamel Richardson, who made eight catches and had a game-high 109 yards, was named Grey Cup MVP. Saskatchewan defensive lineman Keith Shologan was named the Grey Cup's Most Valuable Canadian. Until the end of the 2022 CFL season, this is the most recent time an Eastern-based CFL team has won the Grey Cup in Western Canada.

== Host city ==
On January 26, 2009, it was reported that the 98th Grey Cup had been awarded to Edmonton, Alberta. The CFL made the official announcement on February 24.

This was both the fourth Grey Cup to be held in Edmonton and the fourth to be held at Commonwealth Stadium, the most recent one before this having been the 90th Grey Cup in 2002, between the Montreal Alouettes and the hometown Edmonton Eskimos (with the Alouettes winning 25–16).

The Edmonton Eskimos announced on June 7, 2010, that the 98th Grey Cup had sold out, just one week after tickets went on sale to the general public. This set the record for the quickest sellout in the 98-year history of the game. Tickets prices ranged from $98.00 – $250.00.

== Broadcasting ==
=== Canada ===
In Canada, the game was televised in high-definition by both TSN (English) and RDS (French). TSN play-by-play was provided by Chris Cuthbert, while Glen Suitor provided colour commentary. On RDS the game was announced by play-by-play man Denis Casavant and colour commentator Pierre Vercheval. The RDS broadcast team also included commentary from Marc Labrecque, Mike Sutherland and Claude Mailhot.

TSN aired Grey Cup-related programs throughout the week leading up to the 98th Grey Cup, culminating with extensive coverage on Grey Cup Saturday and TSN's broadcast of the 46th Vanier Cup. TSN's Grey Cup Sunday coverage began at 1 pm ET with a Grey Cup pre-game show hosted by the regular CFL on TSN panel of Dave Randorf, Jock Climie, Matt Dunigan and Chris Schultz. After the game, the panel hosted the post-game show, which was followed by a special post-game edition of SportsCentre.

The game was watched on television by 6.04 million Canadians, making it the second most-watched game in Grey Cup history, slightly behind the previous year's game, which drew 6.1 million viewers. BBM Canada reported that the audience for the game peaked at 7.6 million viewers and that, overall, close to 14 million Canadians—or about 42% of Canada's population—tuned in to watch some or all of the broadcast on TSN and RDS. RDS' French-language broadcast drew an average audience of 1.1 million viewers.

== Entertainment ==
=== Pre-game ceremonies ===
Before the game, Canadian pop rock band Down with Webster performed their single Whoa Is Me, while Canadian rock band The Trews performed the National Anthem.

Donald Ethell, the Lieutenant-Governor of Alberta, took part in the coin toss.

=== Halftime show ===
Canadian rock band Bachman & Turner performed at the Pepsi Max Halftime Show. They played their classic songs "You Ain't Seen Nothing Yet", "Roll On Down the Highway", "Let It Ride", "Slave to the Rhythm", and "Takin' Care of Business" on a temporary on-field stage and were accompanied by a group of dancers.

=== Post-game ceremonies ===
The Grey Cup was presented to the captains of the Montreal Alouettes by CFL Commissioner Mark Cohon and David Johnston, the Governor General of Canada.

== Game summary ==
Montreal Alouettes (21) – TDs, Avon Cobourne (2); FGs Damon Duval (2); cons., Duval (2); singles, Duval (1).

Saskatchewan Roughriders (18) – TDs, Wes Cates, Marc Parenteau; FGs Warren Kean (1); cons., Kean (2); singles, Eddie Johnson (1).

=== Scoring summary ===
First quarter
MTL – TD Cobourne 3 run (Duval convert) (5:39) 7 – 0 MTL
MTL – Single Duval missed 43 field goal (11:14) 8 – 0 MTL
SSK – TD Cates 1 run (Kean convert) (15:00) 8 – 7 MTL
Second quarter
SSK – FG Kean 27 (3:10) 10 – 8 SSK
SSK – Single Johnson 53 punt (14:00) 11 – 8 SSK
Third quarter
MTL – FG Duval 22 (9:25) 11 – 11
Fourth quarter
MTL – FG Duval 42 (1:37) 14 – 11 MTL
MTL – TD Cobourne 2 run (Duval convert) (7:14) 21 – 11 MTL
SSK – TD Parenteau 1-yard pass from Durant (Kean convert) (11:32) 21 – 18 MTL

The Montreal Alouettes came into the game hoping to become the first team to repeat as Grey Cup Champions since the 1996–97 Toronto Argonauts, while the Saskatchewan Roughriders were trying to avenge their last-second loss to Montreal in the previous year's Grey Cup. Anthony Calvillo demonstrated that he was one of the best quarterbacks in the CFL by passing for over 300 yards for the second consecutive Grey Cup game, in leading his Alouettes to back-to-back Grey Cup championships. Jamel Richardson and S.J. Green each had over 100 yards receiving. Avon Cobourne had a strong game for the Alouettes, scoring two touchdowns, including what turned out to be the winning touchdown.

The Alouettes opened up a 7–0 lead 5:39 into the first quarter on a three-yard run by Cobourne as the Riders were pinned deep for most of the opening 15 minutes. Then Duval missed a 31-yard field goal, wide right, scoring a single point to make it 8–0 Montreal at 11:14. The momentum seemed to shift from that point on. A pass interference call on Chip Cox in the Alouettes' end zone gave Saskatchewan a first-and-goal on the Montreal 1-yard line, and Wes Cates scored a touchdown to end the first quarter, with the Alouettes leading 8–7.

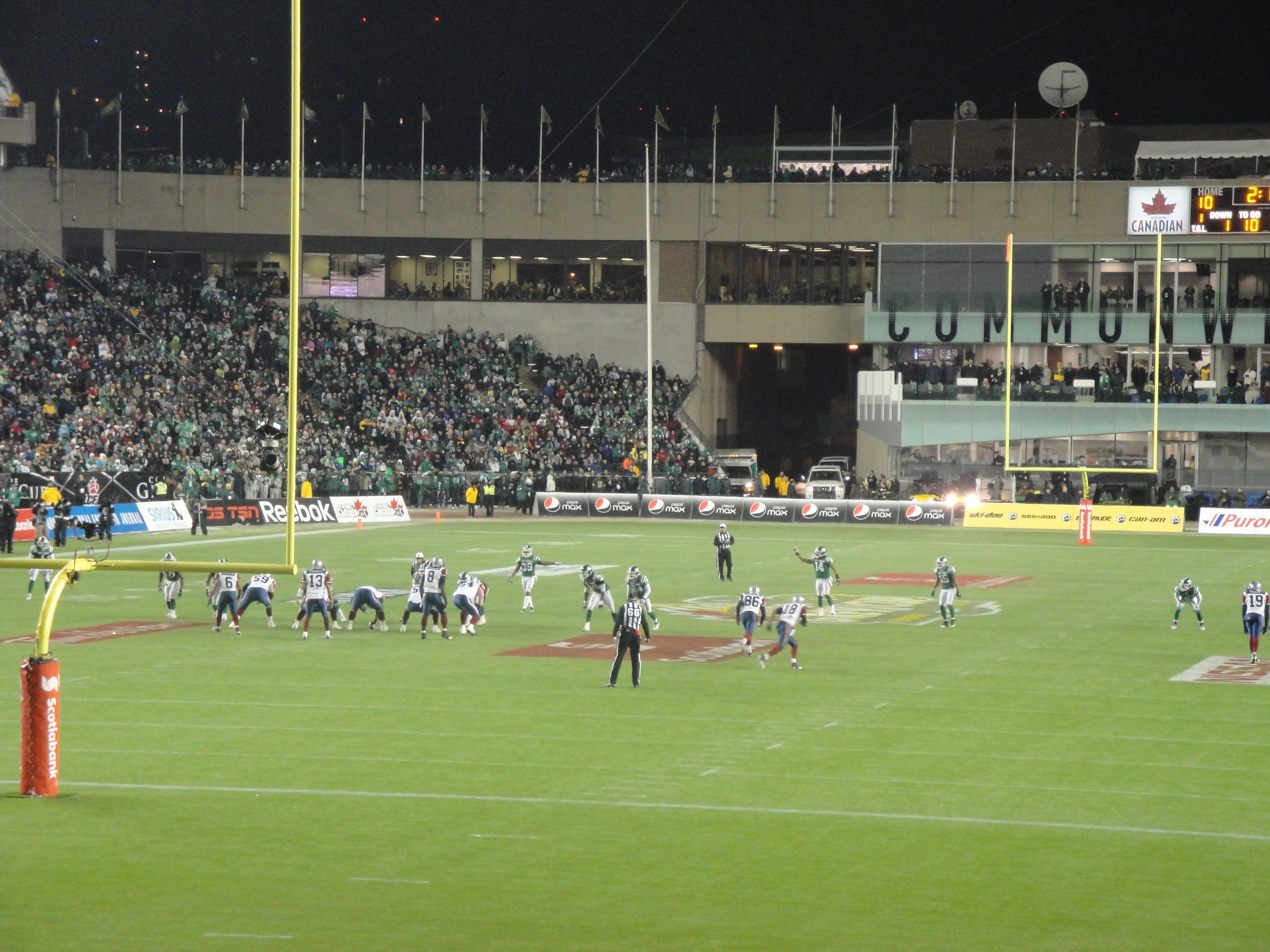
The Alouettes on offense against the Roughriders in the 98th Grey Cup game.

In the second quarter, Warren Kean kicked a 27-yard field goal to put the Roughriders up 10–8 at 3:10 into the second quarter. The Roughriders added to the score with a punt single by Eddie Johnson with a minute to go in the second quarter, and ended the first half with an 11–8 lead. Jerrell Freeman had an excellent half on defence for the Roughriders with three tackles, a quarterback sack, and two pass knockdowns.

One of the key plays of the game happened with 11:06 left in the third quarter, when Marc Trestman gambled on a 3rd-and-2 with a fake punt on the Montreal 41-yard line. The direct snap went to receiver Eric Deslauriers, who ran ten yards for the first down, and that play helped set up a 22-yard Damon Duval field goal to tie the game 11–11 with 5:35 left in the third quarter.

With 13:23 remaining in the fourth quarter, Damon Duval kicked a 42-yard field goal to put the Alouettes up 14–11. On a 2nd-and-5 play scrimmaging from the Saskatchewan 52-yard line with 9:37 left in the fourth quarter, Byron Bullock appeared to intercept an Anthony Calvillo to Ben Cahoon pass attempt. However, Bullock committed pass interference on Ben Cahoon, which nullified the interception, and resulted in a ten-yard Saskatchewan penalty and a first down for the Alouettes. Later during that same Alouettes' drive, on a 2nd-and-7 from the Saskatchewan 40-yard line, Calvillo successfully threw to Jamel Richardson who was in tight coverage by Roughriders' cornerback Omarr Morgan on the Saskatchewan 2-yard line. Avon Coubourne scored on a 2-yard touchdown run to put the Alouettes up 21–11 with 7:46 left in the 4th quarter.

The Riders replied by driving down the field, capped by Darian Durant's 1-yard touchdown pass to Marc Parenteau with 3:28 left in the 4th quarter to make the score 21–18. On the ensuing Alouettes' drive, with 2:49 left in the 4th quarter and the ball on the Alouettes' 40-yard line, Calvillo completed a pass-and-run play to fullback Quincy Carter down the left sideline that took the ball to the Roughriders' 36-yard line. Damon Duval's 40-yard field goal attempt missed wide right.

With 1:07 left in the game and the Roughriders 1st-and-15 at their own 25-yard line, Darian Durant broke out of what looked like a sure sack by Diamond Ferri at the Roughriders' 18-yard line. Durant ran left along the Roughriders' 19-yard line, escaped a diving tackle by Alouettes' defensive end Jermaine McElveen, and then Durant then threw the ball downfield toward the left sideline, but was intercepted by Alouettes' defensive back Billy Parker at the Roughriders' 38-yard line with 56 seconds left in the game. The Alouettes kept the ball on offence for the remainder of the game to win 21–18.

The Alouettes' defence, which had sometimes looked ordinary during the last few weeks of the regular season, came up big in the Grey Cup Final. Darian Durant had an ordinary day passing for only 215 yards after leading the league in passing during the regular season. The Alouettes' defence limited Durant and the Roughdiders to one touchdown pass, one running touchdown, a single and a field goal, as they kept Durant in check to help them win their second straight Grey Cup, and third win of the decade, ensuring the Alouettes' place in history as the first dynasty of the 2000s.

For Anthony Calvillo, Scott Flory, Anwar Stewart, and Ben Cahoon it was their third Grey Cup together as they were all on the Alouettes' 2002 Grey Cup Championship team, and a fourth for Stewart who won his first in 2001 with the Calgary Stampeders a year before joining the Alouettes.

=== Notable game facts ===
- The 98th Grey Cup was watched by 6.04 million Canadian viewers, putting it just behind the previous year's game at second all-time.
- Both teams were playing in their 18th Grey Cup game, while the Roughriders extended their record number of Grey Cup losses to 15 games.
- The previous repeat Grey Cup champions, the 1997 Toronto Argonauts, also won their second consecutive title against the Saskatchewan Roughriders, in a game also played in Edmonton.
- Alouettes Head Coach Marc Trestman has led his team to the Grey Cup game in each of the first three years he has been with the organization.
- Grey Cup Most Valuable Player Jamel Richardson has had three consecutive 100-yard receiving games in the three consecutive Grey Cup games in which he has played.
- Keith Shologan was named the Grey Cup's Most Valuable Canadian, making him the first player from the losing side to achieve that distinction since now teammate Jason Clermont won the award with the BC Lions in the 2004 Grey Cup.
- The game was attended by Saskatchewan Premier Brad Wall, Alberta Lt.-Gov. Donald Ethell, and Alberta Premier Ed Stelmach.

== 2010 CFL playoffs ==
=== Bracket ===
November 14: Division Semi-Finals
E3	Toronto Argonauts	16
E2	Hamilton Tiger-Cats	13
W3	BC Lions	38
W2	Saskatchewan Roughriders	41*

November 21: Division Finals
E3	Toronto Argonauts	17
E1	Montreal Alouettes	48
W2	Saskatchewan Roughriders	20
W1	Calgary Stampeders	16

November 28: 98th Grey Cup; Commonwealth Stadium – Edmonton
E1	Montreal Alouettes	21
W2	Saskatchewan Roughriders	18

*-Team won in Overtime.

=== Division Semi-finals ===
==== East Semi-Final ====
Date and time: Sunday, November 14, 1:00 pm Eastern Standard Time
Venue: Ivor Wynne Stadium, Hamilton, Ontario

Team	Q1	Q2	Q3	Q4	Total
Toronto Argonauts	3	0	10	3	16
Hamilton Tiger-Cats	0	6	0	7	13

==== West Semi-Final ====
Date and time: Sunday, November 14, 3:30 pm Central Standard Time
Venue: Mosaic Stadium at Taylor Field, Regina, Saskatchewan

Team	Q1	Q2	Q3	Q4	OT	Total
BC Lions	3	13	3	8	11	38
Saskatchewan Roughriders	4	3	7	13	14	41

=== Division Finals ===
==== East Final ====
Date and time: Sunday, November 21, 1:00 pm Eastern Standard Time
Venue: Olympic Stadium, Montreal, Quebec

Team	Q1	Q2	Q3	Q4	Total
Toronto Argonauts	0	6	3	8	17
Montreal Alouettes	17	10	7	14	48

The Montreal Alouettes entered the East final with many questions to answer, most notably how their defence would hold against a Toronto team that was full of confidence following their big win over Hamilton the previous weekend. It was obvious from the start of the first quarter that the Alouettes had come ready to play, as they jumped out to a 17–0 lead after fifteen minutes. The Alouette defence kept Toronto starter Cleo Lemon off balance for most of the game. Lemon was sacked and intercepted numerous times and could not get any big plays out of his offence. The Alouette defence kept Cory Boyd from having any big plays and Montreal always kicked away from Argo kick returner Chad Owens, who never had any run-backs like those he had had in the regular season. Anthony Calvillo was sharp, finding Jamel Richardson for two touchdown passes. Avon Cobourne had 163 yards rushing and over 50 yards receiving while helping Montreal to advance to their third straight Grey Cup game under coach Marc Trestman. The Montreal offence was able to score at will against what was supposed to be a good Argonaut defence. Calvillo was well protected and was never really threatened during the game; he gave way to back-up quarterback Adrian McPherson with about eight minutes remaining in the game. The only bright spots for Toronto were kicker Noel Prefontaine, who connected for three field goals, and Jeremaine Copeland, who made an amazing diving catch for his team's only touchdown with less than a minute remaining in the game.

==== West Final ====
Date and time: Sunday, November 21, 2:30 pm Mountain Standard Time
Venue: McMahon Stadium, Calgary, Alberta

Team	Q1	Q2	Q3	Q4	Total
Saskatchewan Roughriders	0	14	6	0	20
Calgary Stampeders	11	0	4	1	16
