= 2007 Saskatchewan Roughriders season =

CFL team season

- General manager: Eric Tillman
- Head coach: Kent Austin
- Home stadium: Mosaic Stadium at Taylor Field

Results
- Record: 12–6
- Division place: 2nd, West
- Playoffs: Won Grey Cup
- Team MOP: Kerry Joseph
- Team MOC: Andy Fantuz
- Team MOR: John Chick

Uniform

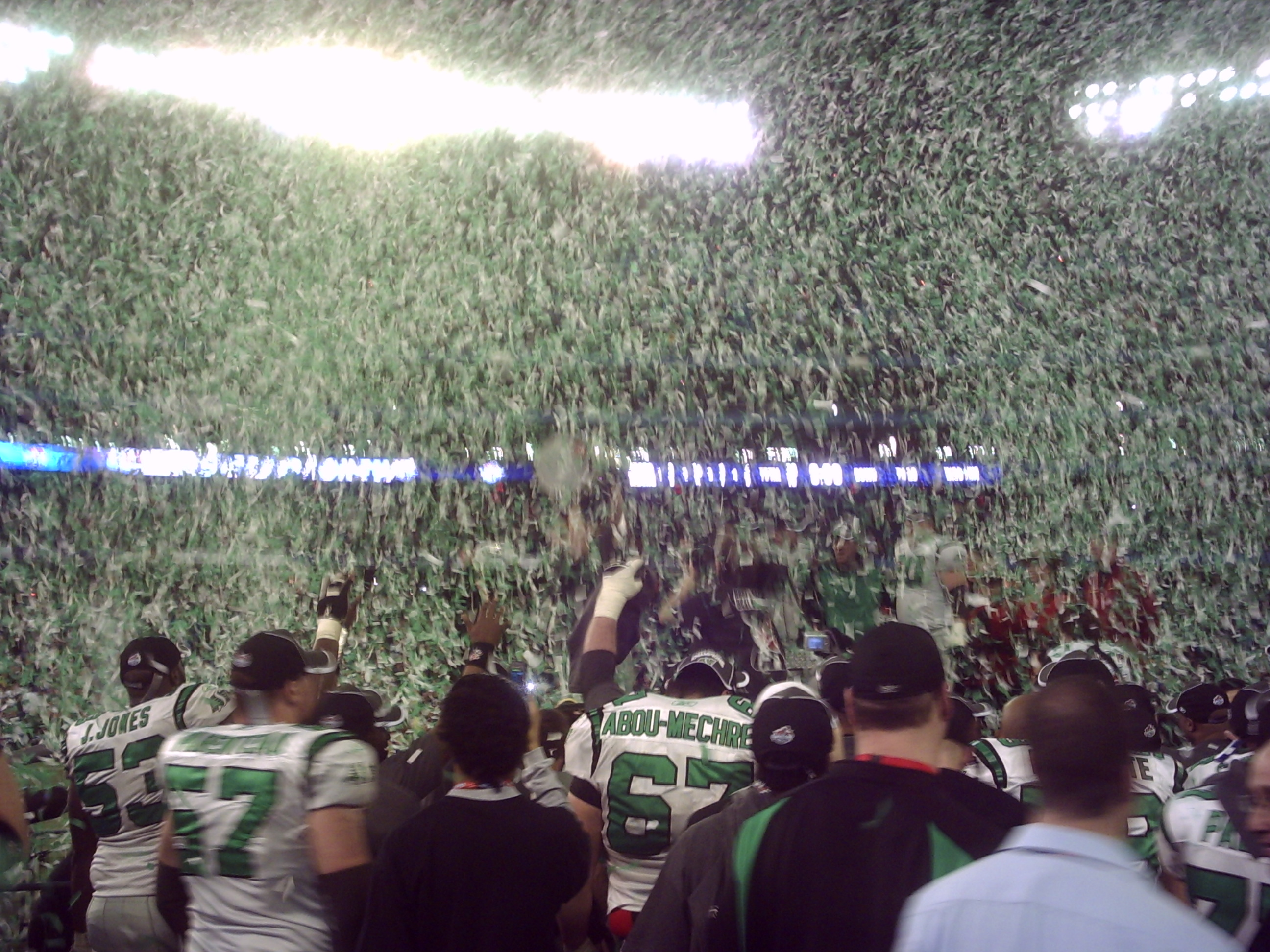
The Roughriders celebrate their Grey Cup victory

The 2007 Saskatchewan Roughriders finished in second place in the West Division with a 12–6 record, which was their highest finish since 1988 when they also finished 2nd. The Roughriders won their third Grey Cup championship after playing the Winnipeg Blue Bombers for the title.

== Offseason ==
=== CFL draft ===
| Round | Player | Position | School/Club team |
|---|---|---|---|
| 9 (Via Hamilton) | David McKoy | WR | Guelph |
| 20 | Yannick Carter | LB | Wilfrid Laurier |
| 28 | Ryan Ackerman | OL | Regina |
| 34 (Via Winnipeg Via Edmonton) | Reggie Bradshaw | RB | Montana |
| 39 (Via Montreal) | Ryan Karhut | OL | Manitoba |

== Preseason ==
| Week | Date | Opponent | Score | Result | Attendance |
|---|---|---|---|---|---|
| B | Fri, June 15 | at BC Lions | 24–15 | Win | 25,321 |
| C | Fri, June 22 | vs. Calgary Stampeders | 23–21 | Win | 28,600 |

== Regular season ==
=== Season standings ===
West Division
| Pos | Team | Pld | W | L | T | PF | PA | PD | Pts |
|---|---|---|---|---|---|---|---|---|---|
| 1 | BC Lions (C, Q) | 18 | 14 | 3 | 1 | 542 | 379 | +163 | 29 |
| 2 | Saskatchewan Roughriders (Q) | 18 | 12 | 6 | 0 | 530 | 432 | +98 | 24 |
| 3 | Calgary Stampeders (Q) | 18 | 7 | 10 | 1 | 473 | 527 | −54 | 15 |
| 4 | Edmonton Eskimos | 18 | 5 | 12 | 1 | 399 | 509 | −110 | 11 |

Source: "2007 Regular Season Standings". Canadian Football League. Archived from the original on 2008-09-21.
(C) First round bye; (Q) Qualified for playoffs

=== Season schedule ===
| Week | Date | Opponent | Score | Result | Attendance | Record |
|---|---|---|---|---|---|---|
| 1 | Fri, June 29 | at Montreal Alouettes | 16–7 | Win | 20,202 | 1–0 |
| 2 | Sun, July 8 | vs. Calgary Stampeders | 49–8 | Win | 25,862 | 2–0 |
| 3 | Fri, July 13 | vs. BC Lions | 42–12 | Loss | 26,981 | 2–1 |
| 4 | Fri, July 20 | at Edmonton Eskimos | 21–20 | Loss | 46,704 | 2–2 |
| 5 | Sat, July 28 | vs. Edmonton Eskimos | 54–14 | Win | 26,840 | 3–2 |
| 6 | Thurs, Aug 2 | at BC Lions | 21–9 | Win | 31,858 | 4–2 |
| 7 | Fri, Aug 10 | at Toronto Argonauts | 24–13 | Win | 34,234 | 5–2 |
| 8 | Sat, Aug 18 | vs. Edmonton Eskimos | 39–32 | Win | 28,800 | 6–2 |
| 9 | Bye | | | | | |
| ‖10‖ | Sun, Sept 2 | vs. Winnipeg Blue Bombers | 31–26 | Win | 28,800 | 7–2 |
| 11 | Sun, Sept 9 | at Winnipeg Blue Bombers | 34–15 | Loss | 29,783 | 7–3 |
| 12 | Sat, Sept 15 | at Calgary Stampeders | 44–22 | Loss | 35,650 | 7–4 |
| 13 | Sat, Sept 22 | vs. BC Lions | 37–34 | Loss | 28,800 | 7–5 |
| 14 | Sat, Sept 29 | vs. Montreal Alouettes | 33–22 | Win | 28,800 | 8–5 |
| 15 | Mon, Oct 8 | at Calgary Stampeders | 33–21 | Win | 33,075 | 9–5 |
| 16 | Sun, Oct 14 | at Hamilton Tiger Cats | 40–23 | Win | 22,167 | 10–5 |
| ‖17‖ | Sun, Oct 21 | vs. Hamilton Tiger Cats | 38–11 | Win | 28,800 | 11–5 |
| 18 | Fri, Oct 26 | at Edmonton Eskimos | 36–29 (OT) | Win | 40,127 | 12–5 |
| 19 | Sat, Nov 3 | vs. Toronto Argonauts | 41–13 | Loss | 28,800 | 12–6 |

# Games played with primary home uniforms.
# Games played with primary white uniforms.
‖#‖ Games played with green retro uniforms.

== Player stats ==
=== Passing ===
| Player | Att | Comp | % | Yards | TD | INT | Rating |
|---|---|---|---|---|---|---|---|
| Kerry Joseph | 459 | 267 | 58.2 | 4002 | 24 | 8 | 97.1 |
| Marcus Crandell | 131 | 78 | 59.5 | 982 | 5 | 5 | 79.8 |
| Andy Fantuz | 1 | 0 | 0.0 | 0 | 0 | 0 | 2.1 |

=== Rushing ===
| Player | No. | Yards | Average | TD | Fumbles |
|---|---|---|---|---|---|
| Wes Cates | 153 | 866 | 5.7 | 5 | 2 |
| Kerry Joseph | 90 | 737 | 8.2 | 13 | 5 |
| Henri Childs | 38 | 143 | 3.8 | 2 | 1 |
| Chris Szarka | 25 | 104 | 4.2 | 1 | 1 |
| Corey Holmes | 14 | 73 | 5.2 | 2 | 1 |

=== Receiving ===
| Player | No. | Yards | Avg. | Long | TD |
|---|---|---|---|---|---|
| D.J. Flick | 70 | 1020 | 14.6 | 53 | 10 |
| Andy Fantuz | 66 | 978 | 17.5 | 72 | 7 |
| Matt Dominguez | 45 | 761 | 16.9 | 69 | 5 |
| Corey Grant | 38 | 458 | 12.1 | 30 | 0 |
| Wes Cates | 45 | 452 | 10.0 | 40 | 0 |

== Postseason ==
=== Scotiabank West Semi-Finals ===
| Team | Q1 | Q2 | Q3 | Q4 | Total |
|---|---|---|---|---|---|
| Calgary Stampeders | 0 | 7 | 10 | 7 | 24 |
| Saskatchewan Roughriders | 13 | 6 | 3 | 4 | 26 |

=== Scotiabank West Finals ===
| Team | Q1 | Q2 | Q3 | Q4 | Total |
|---|---|---|---|---|---|
| Saskatchewan Roughriders | 10 | 3 | 13 | 0 | 26 |
| BC Lions | 7 | 3 | 7 | 0 | 17 |

=== Grey Cup ===
| Team | Q1 | Q2 | Q3 | Q4 | Total |
|---|---|---|---|---|---|
| Saskatchewan Roughriders | 0 | 10 | 6 | 7 | 23 |
| Winnipeg Blue Bombers | 3 | 4 | 7 | 5 | 19 |

Saskatchewan ended the Canadian Football League's longest championship drought with a 23–19 victory over the Winnipeg Blue Bombers in the 95th Grey Cup at Rogers Centre. The Roughriders had not won a title since 1989, and had lost in 13 of their 15 all-time appearances.

An interception by defensive back James Johnson with 54 seconds left in the fourth quarter sealed the victory. It also earned Johnson a place in CFL history – because he became the first player to intercept three passes in a Grey Cup game, and also because he was named the game's MVP. Roughriders receiver Andy Fantuz was named the game's Most Outstanding Canadian. The 23-year-old caught four passes for 70 yards and a touchdown.

== Roster ==
2007 Saskatchewan Roughriders final roster
| Quarterbacks: 8 Marcus Crandell; 14 Darian Durant; 4 Kerry Joseph; Running backs: 20 Wes Cates; 1 Corey Holmes; 32 Neal Hughes; 33 Chris Szarka; Receivers: 83 Andy Fantuz; 3 D. J. Flick; 2 Corey Grant; 86 Nathan Hoffart; 5 Yo Murphy; 77 Michael Palmer | Offensive linemen: 67 Mike Abou-Mechrek G; 59 Jocelyn Frenette G/C; 56 Belton Johnson T; 53 Jermese Jones T; 60 Gene Makowsky T; 54 Jeremy O'Day C; 57 Marc Parenteau G/C; 52 Wayne Smith G/T; Defensive linemen: 51 Marcus Adams DT; 97 John Chick DE; 46 Kitwana Jones DE; 95 Luc Mullinder DT; 41 Fred Perry DE; 96 Scott Schultz DT; Special teams: 30 Jamie Boreham P/K; 10 Luca Congi K | Linebackers: 49 Yannick Carter; 9 Reggie Hunt; 47 Maurice Lloyd; 31 Sean Lucas; 35 Brandon Lynch; 45 Mike McCullough; 42 Anton McKenzie; Defensive backs: 37 Tristan Clovis; 29 Eddie Davis; 15 Lance Frazier; 26 Scott Gordon; 19 James Johnson; 24 Airabin Justin; 17 Tad Kornegay; 21 Rontarius Robinson; Reserve roster: 22 Dustin Cherniawski DB; 87 Kahlil Hill WR; 25 Josh Ranek RB | Injured list: 6 Imokhai Atogwe DB; 80 Carl Berman SB; 66 Chris Best C/G; 27 Henri Childs RB; 99 Brent Curvey DT; 88 Matt Dominguez WR; 43 Tim Fleiszer DE; 79 Terrell Jurineack DE; 18 Vincent Marshall WR; 85 David McKoy WR; 20 Kennedy Nkeyasen DB; 38 Marcus Rucker LB; 50 Val St. Germain G; 13 T. J. Stancil LB; -- Drew Tate QB; 82 Michael Washington WR; 48 Renauld Williams LB; Suspended: Nick Turner RB; Italics indicate American player |

== Awards and records ==
- Kent Austin, CFL Coach of the Year
- Kerry Joseph, Most Outstanding Player Award
- Kerry Joseph, Jeff Nicklin Memorial Trophy
- James Johnson, Grey Cup Most Valuable Player
- James Johnson, first player to intercept three passes in a Grey Cup game
- Andy Fantuz, Grey Cup Most Outstanding Canadian

=== CFL All-Stars ===
- Kerry Joseph, Quarterback
- Jeremy O'Day, Centre

=== CFL Western All-Stars ===
- D. J. Flick, Receiver
- Reggie Hunt, Linebacker
- James Johnson, Cornerback
- Kerry Joseph, Quarterback
- Maurice Lloyd, Linebacker
- Gene Makowsky, Offensive Tackle
- Jeremy O'Day, Centre
- Fred Perry, Defensive End
