= Sammy Okpro =

Canadian football player and coach (born 1984)

Profile
- Position: Defensive back

Personal information
- Born: May 2, 1984 (age 42); Montreal, Quebec, Canada
- Listed height: 5 ft 10 in (1.78 m)
- Listed weight: 186 lb (84 kg)

Career information
- High school: Pierrefonds Comprehensive
- University: Concordia
- CFL draft: 2008: 4th round, 25th overall pick

Career history

Playing
- 2008: Edmonton Eskimos
- 2009: Edmonton Eskimos*
- 2010: Edmonton Eskimos*
- * Offseason or practice squad member only

Coaching
- 2013–2014: Edmonton Huskies
- 2015–2016: Edmonton Huskies
- 2017–?: York Lions

Awards and highlights
- All Canadian (2005) (2006) (2007); All Conference All-Star QUFL (Quebec University Football League) (2005) (2006); Cocorida Defensive Rookie of the year (2004) *Member of Team Canada roster (2003, 2004) *Cegep League Rookie of the year (2002); Vanier Cheetahs M.V.P Defense (2002, 2003); Cegep All-Star Team "AAA" (2002, 2003); Midget League M.V.P. Defense (2001); North Shore Mustangs M.V.P. Defense (2000, Record Holder in Interception 14 int (2002-2003) Vanier Cheetahs
- Stats at CFL.ca (archive)

Sammy Okpro
Medal record

Men's American football

Representing Canada

World Championship
Silver medal – second place	2011 Austria	Team competition

Sammy Okpro (born May 2, 1984) is a Canadian former football player and coach. He played CIS football as a defensive back for the Concordia Stingers from 2004 to 2007. Professionally, he was drafted by the Edmonton Eskimos in the fourth round of the 2008 CFL draft and spent parts of three years with the team.

Okpro was the defensive coordinator for York University's football team, the York Lions of U Sports.

== Early life ==
Okpro first played youth football with Alexander Park as a running back and safety from 1992 to 1997. He then played for the North Shore Lions during high school from 1998 to 1999 where he made the All-Star Team in 1999. He was a member of the North Shore Mustangs from 2000 to 2001 where he was the Midget League M.V.P. Defense in 2001 and made the All-Star Team in both 2000 and 2001. In CEGEP, he played for the Vanier College Cheetahs from 2002 to 2003. There, he was the team MVP on Defense in both years, made the CEGEP All-Star team in both years, and was the CEGEP Rooke of the Year in 2002.

== University career ==
In University, Okpro played for the Concordia Stingers from 2004 to 2007. He was the Stingers' Rookie of the Year in 2004 and was a First-Team All Canadian in 2005, 2006, and 2007, while also being named the team MVP in 2007. He was the first Concordia Stingers football player to win three All-Canadian honours.

== Professional career ==
Okpro was draft in the fourth round, 25th overall, by the Edmonton Eskimos of the Canadian Football League (CFL) in the 2008 CFL draft. He dressed in three regular season games while remaining on the practice roster for the remainder of the 2008 season. He attended training camp with the team in 2009, but was part of the Eskimos' final cuts on June 25, 2009. He was re-signed by the Eskimos on April 12, 2010, but was again part of training camp cuts on June 7, 2010.

== Coaching career ==
Okpro first joined the Edmonton Huskies as the team's defensive backs coach and co-defensive coordinator in 2013. He was then promoted to defensive coordinator in 2015 and served in that role for two years.

On July 17, 2017, it was announced that Okpro had joined the York Lions as the team's defensive coordinator, reuniting him with Warren Craney, who was his coach at Concordia.
