= Josh Bean =

Josh Bean may refer to:

- Josh Bean (Canadian football) (born 1982), American football player
- Joshua Bean (c. 1818–1852), mayor of San Diego, California
