= Nikola Kalinić =

Nikola Kalinić or Kalinic may refer to:

- Nikola Kalinić (footballer) (born 1988), Croatian footballer
- Nikola Kalinić (basketball) (born 1991), Serbian basketball player
- Nikola Kalinic (gridiron football) (born 1997), Canadian gridiron football tight end
