= York Lions football =

University Canadian football team

York Lions
- York Lions logo
- First season: 1968; 58 years ago
- Head coach: Dexter Janke; 2nd year, 7–17–0 (.292)
- Other staff: Jamie Cook (OC); Greg Knox (DC); Fraser Sopik (STC)
- Home stadium: York Lions Stadium
- Year built: 2015
- Stadium capacity: 4000
- Stadium surface: FieldTurf
- Location: Toronto, Ontario
- League: U Sports
- Conference: OUA (1980–present)
- Past associations: CCIFC (1969–1970); OUAA (1971–1973); OQIFC (1974–1979)
- All-time record: 103–334–0 (.236)
- Postseason record: 1–6 (.143)

Titles
- Vanier Cups: 0
- Yates Cups: 0
- Colours: Red, White, and Black
- Outfitter: Adidas
- Rivals: University of Toronto (rivalry)
- Website: yorkulions.ca/football

The York Lions Football team represents York University in Toronto, Ontario, in the sport of Canadian football in U Sports. The York Lions football team has been in continuous operation since 1968 and are one of two teams currently playing in U Sports football to have never won a conference championship. The other team, the Sherbrooke Vert et Or, did not begin their current program until 2003.

The Lions were previously known as the York Yeomen until all York varsity teams changed their nicknames to the Lions in 2003.

== History ==
=== Founding/Early history (1968–1975) ===
The desire from York's student body to have a varsity football team began in the mid-1960s and wasn't realized until 1967 following interest from the faculty. The president of York's Founders College, Fred Halpern, stated that a varsity football team is essential to the creation of spirit necessary to unite all students. The desire to have the team be a varsity program that competed in the Ontario-Quebec Athletic Association was that it was competition deemed worthy of 'the fastest growing university in North America'.

York officially founded the program in spring of 1968 with the hiring of Norbert "Nobby" Wirkowski as York's coordinator of men's athletics and head football coach. Wirkowski previously worked for the Toronto Argonauts as their player personnel director following his professional playing career. Then known as the Yeomen, York would field its first team in the fall of 1968; playing various colleges, universities, and junior teams that year to become eligible to join the Canadian Interuniversity Athletic Association in 1969.

==== 1968 – Inaugural season ====
York's first game would be on September 21, 1968, against the Laurentian Voyageurs which ended in a 28–8 loss. York would achieve its first win in program history on October 4, 1968, with a 30–0 win over the Scarborough College Titans. The following games saw them defeat Victoria College 20–6, the Oakville Colts 33–25, and the Scarborough Rams 27–12; ending the exhibition season with a 4–2 win–loss record after a 23–3 loss to the Guelph Gryphons. Views on the program's future were optimistic as there was improvement game-over-game for the Yeomen with rookie quarterback Larry Iaccino running the offense efficiently and Wirkowski's coaching experience.

==== 1969 season ====
York started play in 1969 within the Central Canada Intercollegiate Football Conference (CCIFC). The Yeomen's first conference game was against the Windsor Lancers on September 21, 1969, which was a 19–7 loss. York would get their first official conference win the week after against the Laurentian Voyageurs 29–6.

During their scheduled bye week, York unconventionally would play in an exhibition against the Oakville Colts of the Junior Ontario Rugby Football Union, which they would win 44–24.

York would go on to lose to the Waterloo Lutheran Golden Hawks 15–9, the Ottawa Gee-Gees 43–0, and the Guelph Gryphons 23–6 and finishing with a 1–5 regular season record.

==== 1970 season ====
York would start their year with the first instance of their rivalry game versus the Toronto Varsity Blues (later known as the Red and Blue Bowl) in an exhibition game. Toronto would win the preseason game 36–0 with York citing the lack of experienced players; 19 of whom have had no college football experience and another 13 with only one year of experience out of a 42-man roster.

This was the start to a year of futility for the Yeomen as they struggled to muster up any offensive output. York would lose its opening game to the Guelph Gryphons 24–0 (a game Wirkowski was critical of the officiating), followed by dropping their next game to the Ottawa Gee-Gees 25–7. They would then drop the following games to the Waterloo Lutheran Golden Hawks 44–2, the Carleton Ravens 12–10, the Windsor Lancers 34–6, and the Laurentian Voyageurs 28–1; going winless in the regular season for the first time in school history. The 26 points that they scored is still the lowest point total in a single season in school history. Linebacker Ken Dyer, who was the team's captain and lone conference all-star, was named the team's MVP.

Following their loss to Laurentian – their first win in 2 years – Wirkowski stated "If a high school kid wants to play college football, York is the place for him... He can start playing right now".

==== 1971 season ====
The Yeomen joined the newly formed Ontario University Athletic Association (OUAA) in 1971 in the Northern division. The expectation was to have a stronger campaign than in 1970 given that they only lost 4 starters (including team MVP Ken Dyer) and felt that they recruited well with Wirkowski stating "we're making a fresh start after a disastrous year. But we have a fine crop of rookies, the best we've ever had." York would start the season with 16 new starters and some strong transfers, including former University of Buffalo quarterback Doug Philip, who had to miss most of the season due to a collarbone injury he suffered in the summer diving into a pool.

York opened the year with a losses to the Ottawa Gee-Gees 21–0, the Windsor Lancers 20–6, and the Carleton Ravens 30–7. York would put up a strong effort in there next game against the Toronto Varsity Blues jumping to a 12–0 lead early, but losing 24–12 in their second-ever rivalry game. The Yeomen would then lose via a last minute 79-yard touchdown pass against the Laurentian Voyageurs 24–21. The week after saw the Queen's Golden Gaels crush York 62–7 after the banged-up Yeomen squad gave up 35 points in the 4th quarter. In a rematch with Laurentian, York would get their first victory of the year 41–0, which saw four different Yeomen throwing touchdown passes. York would close out the year with another loss to Ottawa 14–10; finishing the year with a 1–7 win–loss record.

Slot receiver Steve Ince and defensive back Dave Hamilton were both named to the OUAA all-star team following the season, with LB Rob Panzer being named the team's MVP. As well, OT John Harris was selected in the 1st Round, 6th Overall in the 1972 CFL draft by the Hamilton Tiger-Cats; earning the distinction of being York's first ever CFL draft pick.

==== 1972 season ====
Starting in the 1972 season, York would play at the 33,150 capacity CNE Stadium after playing their prior home games on York's Keele campus. As well, the OUAA decided to move to only two divisions as Laurentian ceased operations of their football program; leaving 11 football members in the OUAA. With this realignment, York moved from the OUAA Northern Division to the 7-team OUAA Western division.

There was some optimism for the Yeomen going into the 1972 season as many players were returning from the previous year's roster and their preseason game against an established Toronto Varsity Blues squad saw a much closer loss than the previous years (14–7). However, York would lose their first 5 games in the regular season before winning their final game against the Guelph Gryphons 30–17 to end the season with a 1–5 record. The season saw LB Rob Panzer again named Team MVP and saw the emergence of rookie RB Bill Hatanaka.

==== 1973 season ====
The 1973 Yeomen had a lot of optimism given an improved offensive line and started off with a commanding preseason win over Seneca College 53-13. However, their regular season started with losses to the Ottawa Gee-Gees (33-7), the Toronto Varsity Blues (42-19), and the Laurier Golden Hawks (38-7), which prior to the game saw the York team bus breaking down and delaying the kickoff time from 8:00 pm to 10:00 pm.

The following two games saw the victors winning off of last-minute rouge plays, with York losing to the Carleton Ravens 16-15 and defeating the McMaster Marauders the following week 16-15 for their first and only victory of the season. The Yeomen would drop their final 3 games against the Guelph Gryphons (28-16), the Carleton Ravens in a rematch (36-6), and the Queen's Golden Gaels (30-22) in a game where York blew a 22-0 4th quarter lead and finished with a 1–7 record.

Much of the Yeomen's issues were due to ball control as York's offense threw 22 interceptions and lost 18 fumbles during the season. Despite the poor record and last-place finish, York did have 4 players named OUAA All-stars: OG Roco DiLello, LB Rob Panzer, RB Bill Hatanaka, and Receiver Steve Ince, whom led the OUAA with 36 receptions and 607 receiving yards and was named Team MVP.

==== 1974 season ====
York joined the new Ontario Quebec Intercollegiate Football Conference (OQIFC) in 1974 and played in the Western Division. Prior to the season, the Yeomen suffered two key losses to their roster: QB Dave Langley and Receiver Steve Ince both transferred to the University of Toronto to play for the Varsity Blues. Langley would go onto great success with the Varsity Blues and lead them to multiple playoff runs.

The Yeomen went on to have a disastrous season; having a 0–7 record. The season included a loss to the Toronto Varsity Blues and former York QB Dave Langley 26-7. Afterwards, the Yeomen suffered a 90-15 blowout loss to the Laurier Golden Hawks, which set the OQIFC record for most points scored by a team in a game. The closest York came to a win on the year was their season finale against the Waterloo Warriors; losing 32-30 in front of only 100 spectators at CNE Stadium.

==== 1975 season ====
Despite the rough 1974, optimism was high for 1975 as the Yeomen had a roster full of upper-year eligibility players. However, they would lose their first three games in similar fashion by giving up leads. First, the Guelph Gryphons would defeat York 23-22 after York carried a 22-7 lead into the 4th quarter. Second, the Waterloo Warriors came back to win 23-16 after York held a 16-9 lead late in the 3rd quarter. Third, the McGill Redmen would defeat York 16-14 after scoring a touchdown on the final play of the game.

York would finally snap their 13-game losing streak with a win over the McMaster Marauders 17-8. York would then go onto lose their final three games by a combined score of 157-0. First, a 56–0 loss to the rival Toronto Varsity Blues. Second, another 56-0 loss to the Western Mustangs. Third, a 45–0 loss to the Windsor Lancers. This gave the Yeomen a 1–6 record on the season and missing the postseason again.

After the season, Bill Hatanaka was drafted in the 1st round (6th overall) of the 1976 CFL Draft by the Ottawa Rough Riders. Other York draftees that year include RB Bob Palmer (5th round, 37th overall to the Toronto Argonauts), LB Rick Slipetz (5th round, 40th overall to the Toronto Argonauts), QB/DB Doug Kitts (5th Round, 42nd overall to the Ottawa Rough Riders), and DT Craig Lorimer was a Territorial Exemption Pick for the Toronto Argonauts.

On June 4th, 1976, Wirkowski would step down to focus on his role as coordinator of men's interuniversity athletics, stating "I feel we should look for someone that can devote all his time to the program".

=== Dick Aldridge Era (1976–1977) ===
On July 13, 1976, York hired recently retired CFL Linebacker Dick Aldridge as the program's new head coach, but working on a part-time basis as Aldridge was also a teacher and sports coach at Banting Memorial High School in Alliston.

==== 1976 season ====
At York's 1976 training camp, only 40 players showed up for tryouts for the Yeomen, leading to Aldridge stating "Canadians are scared of hard work, we're just a very fat country, and some people in this University who could be helping our football team are just lazy." Just prior to the season, Quarterbacks Frank Subat and Paul King, 2nd- and 3rd-year members of the Yeomen respectively, left the team and only had 34 total players on their roster.

The Yeomen would go onto a dismal 0-7 season; scoring only 36 points all year. The losses were to the Laurier Golden Hawks (41-9), the Western Mustangs (54-6), the Windsor Lancers (48-0), the Guelph Gryphons (42-6), the Toronto Varsity Blues (34-2), the McMaster Marauders (26-11), and the Waterloo Warriors (6-1). The player exodus led to may first year players being thrust into action before they were ready; most notably rookie QB Mike Foster, who threw for a 28% completion rate, 441 yards, 2 touchdowns, and 17 interceptions over the season.

Reflecting on the season, Aldridge did assess the situation in training camp, stating "I had to ask myself why these players quit. It bothered me. I had to ask myself, is it me?... From what I could tell it wasn't me or my staff but rather that these kids had been through the frustration and they didn't want to go through another year of that." Aldridge also made statements that York had not recruited well in the past, the lack of proper equipment and weight facilities being a problem for development, and was re-evaluating his future with the team; acknowledging the difficulties of balancing being a university Head Football coach and full-time teacher. For accolades, DB Angelo Kioutsis and Paul Sheridan were both named to the OUAA all-star team.

During the offseason, Chairman and Director of Physical Education and Athletics Frank Cosentino would assure that Aldridge would remain as head coach for the 1977 season. However, there were calls from some of the York student body to explore cutting the football team entirely due to the lack of success compared to all other varsity sports teams at York and how it's football team with mostly negative attention is causing the school's reputation to falter.

==== 1977 season ====
60 players would report to training camp in 1977 and Aldridge was expecting a rebuilding year going into their regular season. In a preseason jamboree consisting of half-hour scrimmages, the Yeomen would lose to the Waterloo Warriors (17-0), the McMaster Marauders (3-0), tie with the Laurier Golden Hawks (7-7), and defeat the Guelph Gryphons (9-0).

York would once again go winless for the season; sporting a 0–7 record starting with losses to the Laurier Golden Hawks (17-1), the Western Mustangs (56-4), and the Windsor Lancers (46-4). Their fourth game against the Guelph Gryphons was the closest York came to a victory as they lost 17-15. The week after against the McMaster Marauders saw the Yeomen give up 7 fumbles in a muddy 15-1 loss. The Yeomen would close out their season losses to the Toronto Varsity Blues 28-6 and the Waterloo Warriors 26-7.

On January 20, 1978, it was announced that Aldridge resigned to take over as the head coach of a new Toronto Northern Football Conference team. Aldridge left primarily as York was looking to have a full-time head coach in the position and Aldridge was not willing to leave his job teaching. Aldridge would go 0–14 over his two seasons at York, losing on average 32–5.

=== Frank Cosentino era (1978–1980) ===
On February 2, 1978, York named former Western Mustangs Head Coach and CFL Hall of Famer Frank Cosentino as their new head coach. Prior to being named the Yeomen's head coach, Cosentino was already working in York's athletics department as he was hired as the Chair of the Department of Physical Education in 1975, a role he also kept on during his time as the head football coach. This was all following his tenure at Western, where as their head coach, led the Mustangs to 2 Vanier Cup titles in 1971 and 1974. In addition, York also named 1973 Hec Crighton trophy winner Dave Pickett as part of the full-time staff after serving as an assistant in the 1977 season; giving York 2 full-time coaches for the first time in their history.

During the 1978 season, Cosentino immediately started to turn around the Yeomen's fortunes, starting that season 4–1 and finishing 4–3 in the campaign; en route to being named OUA West Coach of the Year. In his tenure, York would also become nationally ranked for the first time in program history. Despite the turnaround, York would fail to reach the postseason during this time and Cosentino stepped down as head coach following the 1980 season. Cosentino held a record of 10 wins and 10 losses during this tenure as head coach. As well in 1980, York would return to the OUA .

=== Dave Pickett era (1981–1983) ===
In 1981, York promoted Dave Pickett to be their new head coach. Pickett was part of York's staff since 1977 following his playing career with the Saskatchewan Huskies and Windsor Lancers. Under Pickett, the Yeomen would fail to reach the postseason.

After the 1983 season on October 25, 1983, Pickett announced his retirement from football at age 31, stating "There are other things I wanted to do... football has never been the only thing in my life, and I never thought of myself as a career football coach... other options have presented themselves". Pickett would go 5–16 as the Yeomen's head coach.

=== Wirkowski/Cosentino era (1984–1989) ===
On March 8, 1984, York would name both the team's founder Nobby Wirkowski and Frank Cosentino as Associate Head Coaches. In their first season together in 1984, the Yeomen would finish 5–2 and get into the playoffs for the first time in program history. This would happen again in 1985 where in both cases, they lost in the first round of the OUA playoffs. During the rest of their tenure, York would fail to reach the postseason.

Prior to the 1988 season, Cosentino would step down from the position with Wirkowski being the sole head coach. The Yeomen would finish 1–6 in 1988 and 0–7 in 1989. After the season, Wirkowski announced his retirement from the position and still worked at York until 1992 within the athletic department.

=== Tom Arnott era (1990–2000) ===
Before the 1990 season, York named Tom Arnott as the program's new head coach. Arnott was tasked in rebuilding the program and had struggled early on, going winless from 1990 to 1994, which set a Canadian University football record of 47-straight losses from 1988 to 1995. This record was later broken with the Toronto Varsity Blues having a 49-game losing streak from 2001 to 2008.

In 1994, Arnott's plan started to turn the program around; going from an 0–8 record to 4–4, leading to Arnott be named OUA coach of the year. Arnott would win the award again in 1997 after leading the Yeomen to a 6–2 record, finishing fourth-place in the OUA, and bringing York to the postseason for the 3rd time in program history.

On January 9, 2001, Arnott announced that he would leave York in 2001 to join the Guelph Gryphons coaching staff, his alma-mater, as an assistant coach. Arnott was quoted saying "We failed to achieve our goals at York and after evaluating the situation, I felt it was time to make a personal change and this was the move to make." Afterwards, Tom Gretes, the Yeomen's Defensive coordinator (DC), would be promoted to head coach.

=== Tom Gretes era (2001–2006) ===
==== 2001 season ====
Prior to the 2001 season, both the Queen's Golden Gaels and Ottawa Gee-Gees joined the OUA in 2001. To accommodate this, the OUA expanded the postseason to include 8 out of 10, in which that time the Yeomen/Lions would qualify for the playoffs for four consecutive seasons.

York would start the season with a 38–8 loss to the Guelph Gryphons, followed up by a 16–15 loss to the Western Mustangs. In week 3, the Yeomen would get their first win of the year over the Toronto Varsity Blues 33–10. York would drop the next two games to their new OUA counterparts Queen's (24–22) and Ottawa (39–31), then would win their next two against Windsor (19–17) and Waterloo (25–22), which would get York to qualify for the postseason for the first time since 1997.

The Yeomen would drop their season finale to the McMaster Marauders 50–0, leading them to finish with a 3–5 record and getting the #8 seed, which led to a rematch with McMaster. The Yeomen would lose the rematch 62–0 to the eventual Yates Cup champions. After the season, DB Dennis Mavrin was named a CIAU All-Canadian.

==== 2002 season ====
York began the 2002 season with a victory over the Guelph Gryphons 23–11, followed up by a loss to the Western Mustangs 16–11 and a 14–6 win over the Toronto Varsity Blues. After falling to the Queen's Golden Gaels 35–17, York would win 3 straight games against the Ottawa Gee-Gees (12–9), the Windsor Lancers (22–3), and the Laurier Golden Hawks (22–6) before losing to the McMaster Marauders 27–0 in the season finale; finishing with a 5–3 record.

The Yeomen not only qualified for the playoffs for the second time in a row, but for the first time in program history would host a playoff game, as they ended up tied with the #10 ranked Ottawa Gee-Gees for 4th place in the OUA, but had higher seeding with them winning the regular season matchup. The game was also set up for a national broadcast to celebrate the program's achievement. York would go onto beat Ottawa 12–4, in which the scoring came from kicker Gianfranco Rocca hitting 3 field goals and scoring a rouge, and defensive end Paul Graca sacking Ottawa QB James Baker for a safety. This was York's first ever postseason victory in program history and so far the only playoff game York has ever won. York would go onto to the Semifinals, putting up a solid effort but losing 29–14 to the undefeated McMaster Marauders.

After the season, Tom Gretes was named OUA Coach of the Year and DE Jeet Rana was named OUA Lineman of the Year. Rana was also named a CIS Second-team All-star alongside teammate DB Dennis Mavrin.

==== 2003 season ====
In their first season with a new name, the Lions looked to build off their strong 2002 season as they had 17 returning starters on the team. Some also predicted that York was going to be the most improved squad heading into the year and had the potential to take down some of the OUA's top programs.

However, the 2003 season went much different than predicted, as York dropped their first two games to the Queen's Golden Gaels (47–7 loss) and the McMaster Marauders (51–0 loss). York would win the next 2 out of 3 games, but followed up with a big loss to the Western Mustangs 44–15.

York would win their final game against the Ottawa Gee-Gees 23–3 to qualify for the postseason and finish the year with a 3–5 record. While the main story of the game was the Lions making the OUA playoffs for the 3rd consecutive year, the contest also saw a dominating performance by rookie RB Andre Durie, who set an OUA record with 349 rushing yards.

York would have a rematch with the Queen's Golden Gaels in the Quarterfinals, which they would lose 27–6.

==== 2004 season ====
The OUA changed their playoff structure prior to the 2004 season with the top 7 teams qualifying for the postseason instead of the top 8. York was looking to keep up their streak of playoff appearances following these changes. HC Tom Gretes brought in Ottawa Gee-Gees Offensive Coordinator Andy McEvoy to be the team's new OC and was confident that the Lions would have a strong start to the year based on their first 3 opponents.

However, York would start the 2004 season 0–2 on the year before defeating the Waterloo Warriors 55–33, led by RB Andre Durie's 211 rushing yards and 6 rushing TDs; becoming the 3rd player in Canadian collegiate football history with 6 rushing touchdowns in a single game. The Lions would finish the year 3–5 with victories over the Toronto Varsity Blues and the Windsor Lancers and qualify for the playoffs despite losing their final regular season game to the undefeated Laurier Golden Hawks, 38–19.

York would go onto face the Western Mustangs in the OUA Quarterfinals. Despite strong performances by RB Andre Durie (168 rush yards, 1 TD) and QB Bart Zemanek (15/17, 224 pass yards, 2 TDs), Western managed to gain 432 rushing yards onto a dominating 54–18 victory; eliminating the Lions. This currently is the last time York has qualified for the OUA postseason.

York boasted 5 OUA all-stars that season with RB Andre Durie, DE Ricky Foley, and DB Clinton John named to the First-team, WR Ricardo Hudson named to the Second-team, and DB Sam Opaleye being named to the First-team as a specialist and Second-team as a safety. Durie was also named to the First-team CIS All-Canadian team alongside McMaster Marauders RB Jesse Lumsden, while Foley was named a CIS Second-team All-Canadian.

==== 2005 season ====
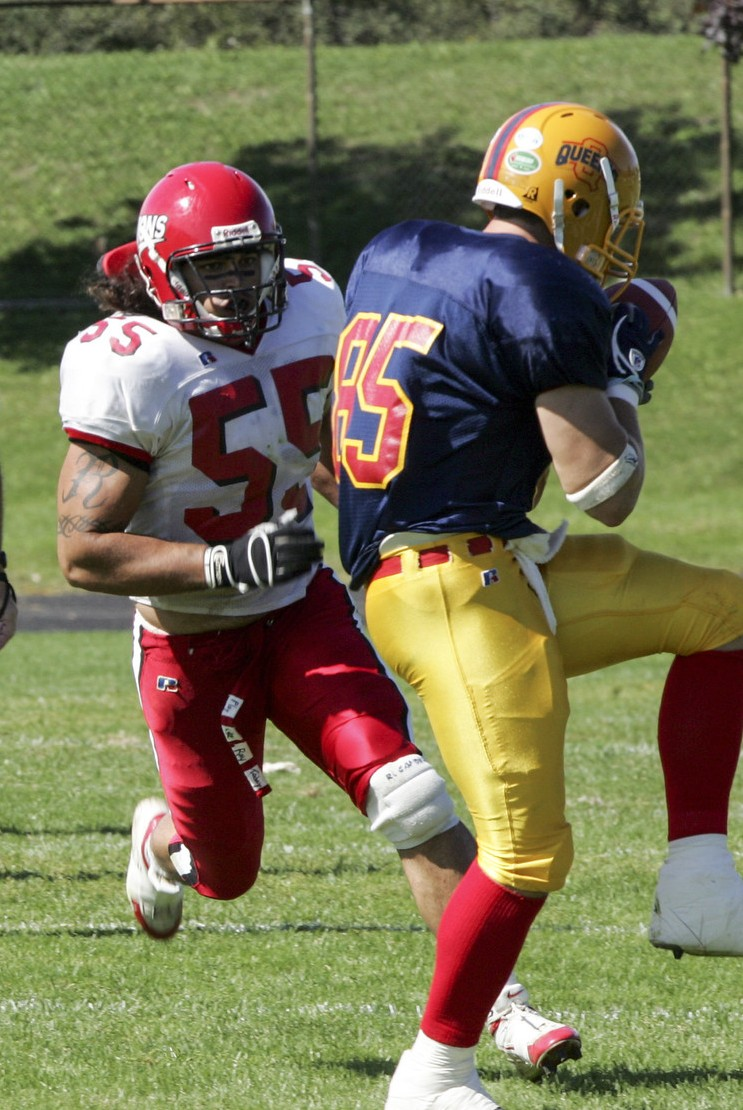
York Lions LB Ricky Foley (55) chases down a Queen's player (09/10/2005)

The Lions were looking forward to building off the 2004 season as they returned 22 starters on offense and defense. York would start the 2005 season strong with a 20–16 win over the Waterloo Warriors.

In week 2 versus the Queen's Gaels, star RB Andre Durie would suffer a catastrophic knee injury while attempting a juke early in the contest, which would be the last time he played as a York Lion as he spent the following two years rehabilitating his knee before moving onto the CFL. York would go onto lose that game 40–7, but responded with back-to-back wins over the Toronto Varsity Blues (23–20 in Overtime) and the Guelph Gryphons (22–15). York would struggle the rest of the season ending with a 3–5 record and missing the playoffs for the first time since 2000.

==== 2006 season ====
The 2006 season saw the Lions start a rebuild as the Lions returned with many new faces all over the roster. York would start the season 0–4 before facing the Toronto Varsity Blues in the 37th Red and Blue Bowl on national television. York would win the game 39–11 led by QB Bart Zemanek's 339 passing yards and 3 touchdown passes in the game and a strong defensive performance. York would go onto drop their last 3 games to the Windsor Lancers (41–28), the Queen's Gaels (9–4), and the Waterloo Warriors (13–8); finishing the year with a 1–7 record.

In the ensuing offseason, York fired Gretes due to an incident at the York athletics banquet that year and named Offensive Coordinator Andy McEvoy as the interim replacement.

=== 2007 season ===
McEvoy led the team for the 2007 season and managed to achieve a 1–7 record. York's was blown out to start the year against the Windsor Lancers 59–0, but had a strong showing against the Waterloo Warriors in an 18–15 loss the following week. York would lose by wide margins for the rest of the year, except for their 21–20 win over the struggling Toronto Varsity Blues and a surprisingly close loss to the powerful Western Mustangs 11–9; a game which saw both teams tied 8–8 heading into the 4th quarter.

=== Mike McLean era (2008–2009) ===
==== 2008 season ====
On February 21, 2008, York named former CFLer and Saint Mary's Defensive Coordinator Mike McLean as head coach with McEvoy returning as an offensive assistant. On April 24, 2008, McLean also brought in Beau Mirau to be his Offensive Coordinator, whom McLean worked with for years when they were both coaching with the CJFL's Edmonton Huskies to replace McEvoy.

York finished the 2008 season winless for the first time since 1994 with an 0–8 record; averaging only 4 points-per-game for and 58.9 points-per-game against over the season. This included an embarrassing 58–7 loss to the Toronto Varsity Blues (ending York's 13-year winning streak against their rivals and saw the son of former York Head Coach Tom Gretes, George, throw a TD pass late in the game), a 71–0 loss to the Western Mustangs, and an 80–0 loss to the Queen's Gaels, which was the largest margin of victory in Queen's football history to that point. York also didn't manage to set up a full dress roster for the entire 2008 season, with McLean claiming that he had no time to recruit new players after being named head coach and said that the program was in free fall when he arrived.

==== 2009 season ====
The 2009 season opened up with a close loss to the Windsor Lancers 17–14 in which the highlight of the game was when York Returner Jason Marshall took a missed field goal 125-yards for a touchdown with 40 seconds left in the game. This was as close as the Lions got to victory that season however, as they finished again with an 0–8 record and being outscored 83–397 the rest of the season.

On February 17, 2010, York announced that OC Beau Mirau was leaving the program. Mike McLean was also fired on March 16, 2010, with the athletic department citing 'serious philosophical differences' and a 'lack of accountability' as the primary reasons for the removal.

=== Warren Craney era (2010–2022) ===
==== 2010 season ====
On May 10, 2010, York hired former Concordia Stingers DC Warren Craney to become the program's 9th head coach starting in the 2010 season. Craney then brought in Montreal Carabins assistant coach Harry LaFlamme and former Western Mustang QB Michael Faulds – who is the record holder for the most passing yards in CIS history – as the new Defensive and Offensive Coordinators respectively. York would go 0–8 over the season; being outscored 73–413 over the year with the closest game being a 24–19 loss to the rival Toronto Varsity Blues which saw York almost complete a late comeback led by QB Nick Coutu's 421 total yard performance.

==== 2011 season ====
In the 2011 season, Craney guided the Lions to their first win in 3 seasons against the Waterloo Warriors 20–18 in overtime – snapping a 29-game losing streak for the program. The following offseason, Craney would take over as Defensive Coordinator, with Laflamme being moved to Special Teams Coordinator.

==== 2012 season ====
Prior to the 2012, York was able to get University of South Alabama QB Miles Gibbon to transfer to the program. With a new QB at the helm, the Lions finished with a 2–6 record, the most wins for the program since 2005 and in 7th place, their highest finish in eight years. This included an impressive 47–36 win over the Ottawa Gee-Gees that some saw as the turning point for the program going forward. This season would include many one-score losses to the likes of the Laurier Golden Hawks (24–20 loss), the Waterloo Warriors (23–22 loss), and the Windsor Lancers (26–22 loss). These results signaled that the Lions were showing signs of growth and rebuilding into a competitive football team.

As well, the Lions had one player get an OUA All-star nod, WR Will Austin, who was named to the Second-team and the first Lion since 2007 to be named to the team.

==== 2013 Offseason/Dan Younis Scandal ====
However, the 2013 offseason managed to take away much of the momentum the team had built up to that point. On January 8, 2013, the teams' OC since 2010, Michael Faulds, was hired as the new head coach of the Laurier Golden Hawks. Since then, the Lions haven't been able to produce offensively at the same level since Faulds was the offensive coordinator. The following day on January 9, 2013, Mike Comeau, the Lions' Offensive Line coach, was promoted to Offensive Coordinator following Faulds' departure.

However, much worse news happened in February, as the team's recruiting coordinator, Daniel Younis, was arrested on charges relating to child pornography and child-luring. York University immediately severed ties with Younis following the arrest. Later that April, Younis was charged with eight more counts of child-luring. This led to many issues and concerns with incoming recruits who were in direct contact with Younis, as well with those who were not as the news made national headlines. This severely affected the team's ability to recruit and affected the program in the years following.

==== 2013 season ====
In 2013, the Lions finished 2–6 leading to an 8th overall finish in the OUA and matching their previous season's record. Their wins came against their former coach Michael Faulds' Laurier Golden Hawks 33–20, and against the reborn Carleton Ravens 50–34. This season also saw York lose to the Toronto Varsity Blues for the first time since 2011, a 56–35 loss which saw Toronto score 32 points in the second quarter.

Following that season, Craney signed a contract extension to remain at the helm of the program and parted ways with LaFlamme.

==== 2014 season ====
The effects of the 2013 offseason hit the program hard as the Lions went 0–8 in the 2014 season for the first time since 2010 which started with back-to-back massive losses; one a 61–0 loss to the Western Mustangs, and the other an embarrassing 70–0 loss to their rivals, the Toronto Varsity Blues.

The closest game of the season came against the Waterloo Warriors, where York had a strong 4th quarter that saw RB Connor Anderson score a TD with 14 seconds remaining. However, the point after attempt kick was fumbled; leaving the score at 32–31 Waterloo. York would recover an onside kick to get one more chance, but kicker Nick Naylor missed a 56-yard FG attempt to win the game as time expired.

==== 2015 season ====
The 2015 offseason saw York bring in one of the best recruiting classes in the country, headlined by QB Brett Hunchak, SB Colton Hunchak, WR Jacob Janke, LB Jakob Butler, LB Jakub Jakoubek, WR Nathaniel Pinto, TE Nikola Kalinic, and RB Jesse Amankwaa. A lot of the recruiting success can be attributed to Craney also serving as the head coach of Team Canada for the IFAF World Junior Championships; a position he held from 2014 to 2016 winning a silver and gold medal over two tournaments.

In the 2015 season, the young Lions improved to a 1–7 record with their lone win coming against the Waterloo Warriors 23–14. York capped off the season by nearly upsetting the #10 ranked Queen's Gaels, losing 33–32. The Lions also had 4 players named to the OUA All-Rookie team (RB Jesse Amankwaa, LB Jakob Butler, SB Colton Hunchak, and WR Nathaniel Pinto) with Amankwaa winning OUA Rookie of the Year.

During the offseason, Offensive Coordinator Mike Comeau stepped away from his position. On November 27, 2015, York announced former McMaster Marauder QB and Hec Crighton award winner Kyle Quinlan as the new offensive coordinator, with Kamau Peterson remaining in his role as associate offensive coordinator.

==== 2016 season ====
York started the 2016 season off well winning 2 of their first 3 games against Waterloo and Windsor. In their 56–32 win over the Windsor Lancers, QB Brett Hunchak set a single-game York record for pass yards with 540. However, their week 4 loss to Toronto 45–18 was the turning point of the season, as York would lose all their remaining games by a combined score of 220–37 and finish 2–6.

After the season in December, Quinlan left the team to coach at his alma mater, McMaster. Kamau Peterson was named the interim Offensive Coordinator and later named the permanent OC on January 25, 2017.

==== 2017 season ====
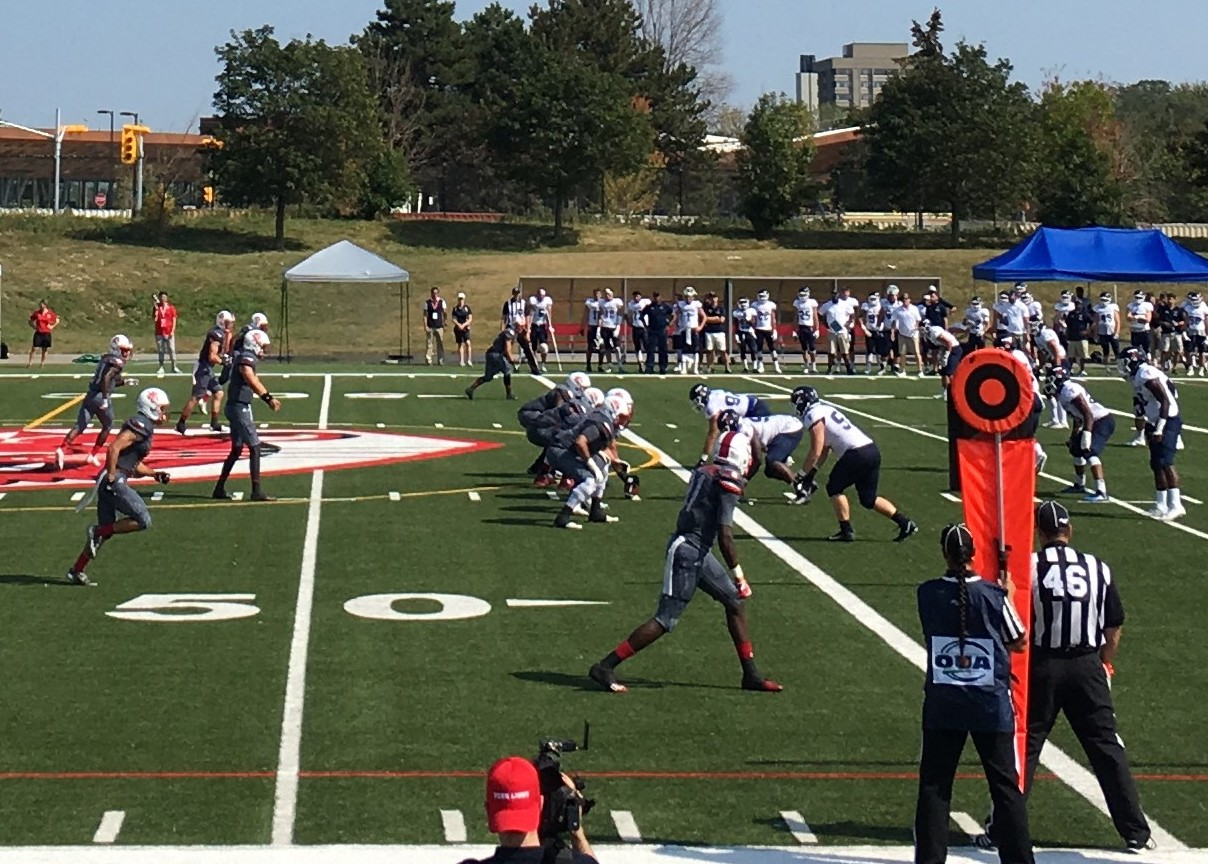
York Lions on offence against the Toronto Varsity Blues (09/23/2017).

Prior to the 2017 season, York hired two new assistants: Two-time CIS All-Canadian Jesse Alexander was named Special Teams Coordinator on April 5, 2017, and three-time CIS All-Canadian Sammy Okpro was hired as Defensive Coordinator on July 17, 2017; the latter whom played under Craney while both were with the Concordia Stingers.

The Lions suffered two blowout losses to start the year to the Western Mustangs and Waterloo Warriors, but put up a strong fight against the #9 ranked Ottawa Gee-Gees; losing 26–17. The following week, York would beat the Toronto Varsity Blues handily; winning 41–16, which was the Lions' lone win of that season. York would finish the year with a 1–7 record, but started to show more life offensively down the stretch.

On April 24, 2018, Jesse Alexander stepped down as Special Teams Coordinator with York, and on the same day was announced as the new Defensive Coordinator for the Windsor Lancers.

==== 2018 season ====
York started the 2018 season with back-to-back losses to the Queen's Gaels and Guelph Gryphons. Their next game saw the Lions start off strong, leading them to a win against the Windsor Lancers 29–22, followed up by a 76–3 loss to the #1 nationally ranked Western Mustangs and a 42–16 loss to the Ottawa Gee-Gees.

The week 6 contest versus the Waterloo Warriors was the Lions highlight of the year. York started the game very strong with a 26–14 lead heading into the half over the heavily favoured Warriors. However, Warriors QB Tre Ford led a massive comeback to give the Warriors a 31–26 lead with 12:01 left in the 4th Quarter. York's offense responded with a 9-play drive capped off with Lions QB Brett Hunchak throwing a 5-yard TD pass to his brother, Colton Hunchak to regain the lead. The Lions then converted the 2-point conversion on a pass to RB Kayden Johnson to make the score 34–31. After a Waterloo drive stalled out, Waterloo kicker Caleb Girard missed a field goal, but managed to score a rouge to bring the score to 34–32 York. After the ensuing York drive ended in a punt, Waterloo QB Tre Ford, whom threw for 437 yards and 3 touchdowns in the game, led a massive drive to bring the Warriors to the Lions 25-yard line with 10 seconds remaining. On the ensuing field goal attempt, the kick was blocked by freshman LB Matt Dean, leading to a York victory.

York would lose their next game against the Carleton Ravens 35–20, knocking them out of playoff contention. York would finish the season with a 31–15 victory over the Toronto Varsity Blues, ending the year with a 3–5 record; the most wins the program has had in 13 years.

==== 2019 season ====
The Lions were hopeful in building off their previous season and returned many starters for the 2019 season while losing some key players to the CFL (namely SB Colton Hunchak and TE Nikola Kalinic). However, injuries to key starters and mistakes caused the Lions to start the season 0–6, averaging 14.3 points for and 39.2 points against in those contests. Their lone win came against the Toronto Varsity Blues, a 34–14 win, then followed up with a 23–2 loss to the Queen's Gaels to finish the year with a 1–7 record.

After the season, the Lions and Offensive Coordinator Kamau Peterson parted ways.

==== 2020–2021 ====
Prior to the 2020 season, York hired two-time Hec Crighton trophy winner Tommy Denison as their new offensive coordinator, whom previously was with the Toronto Varsity Blues in 2019.

After the COVID-19 pandemic cancelled the 2020 season, York was hopeful of potentially making the OUA postseason for the first time since 2004 with modified playoff qualifications where they would needed to finish 4th in the 5-team OUA East division.

York opened the 2021 season with a 37–6 loss to the Laurier Golden Hawks, followed up by a 30–17 loss to the Carleton Ravens. York would lose a heartbreaker in their next game to the Ottawa Gee-Gees 20–17, where Ottawa QB Ben Maracle threw a TD pass to Nick Gendron with 1:06 remaining in the game. The following game, despite a very strong defensive effort only giving up 139 total yards of offence, York lost to the Toronto Varsity Blues 25–2; ending a 4-year reign as the Argo Cup Champions. After that loss, York would drop their final two games by a combined score of 89–9 to the McMaster Marauders and a rematch with Toronto; finishing the year 0–6 and last in the OUA East division. After the season, York and Denison would part ways.

On March 29, 2022, Warren Craney was put on a leave of absence as the school conducted a thorough review and investigation of the football program with Defensive Coordinator Sammy Okpro being named interim head coach during that time. Upon the conclusion of the investigation, Craney was reinstated as the head coach for the 2022 season with Okpro returning to his DC role.

==== 2022 season ====
Prior to the season starting, Craney promoted Special Teams Coordinator, Nathaniel Griffith, to Offensive Coordinator, and hired former CFLer Brian Jones as the new Special Teams Coordinator. During the 2022 season, the Lions finished 1–7 with their lone win coming against the McMaster Marauders, whom had to forfeit the contest for having an ineligible player on their roster.

The biggest bright spot for the season was KR/SB Alfred Olay, whom led the nation in All-purpose yards (1,377 yards) and was named a First-team U Sports All-Canadian returner; the first Lion to be named to that team since Andre Durie in 2004. Olay also was an OUA First-team All-Star returner, with DE Jason Janvier-Messier and LB Matt Dean being named to the Second-team.

After the season, Craney stepped down as head coach with Okpro again being named the interim head coach. Craney was the longest tenured head coach in the history of the program at 12 seasons.

=== 2023 season ===
During the 2023 offseason, Okpro and York parted ways, leaving a vacancy at head coach. After a search for a replacement, Offensive Coordinator Nathaniel Griffith and Special Teams Coordinator Brian Jones were named Associate Head Coaches just two weeks prior to the start of the regular season. This marked the 2nd time in program history that York would name associate Head Coaches to lead the program.

York started the campaign with an 83–0 loss to the eventual Yates Cup Champion Western Mustangs, but bounced back to a closer 53–32 loss against the Waterloo Warriors. York lost every other remaining game by wide margins; being outscored 10 to 424 in the remaining 6 games. This included an 87–0 loss to the Queen's Gaels, which set their single-game record for most points scored and largest margin of victory in the program's 141-year history, and an 88–7 loss to the Guelph Gryphons, which is the most points scored in a single game in their history.

After the disastrous 2023 season where the Lions allowed an average of 70 points per game and only scored 5.25 points per game, York's athletic department started a national search for a new head coach.

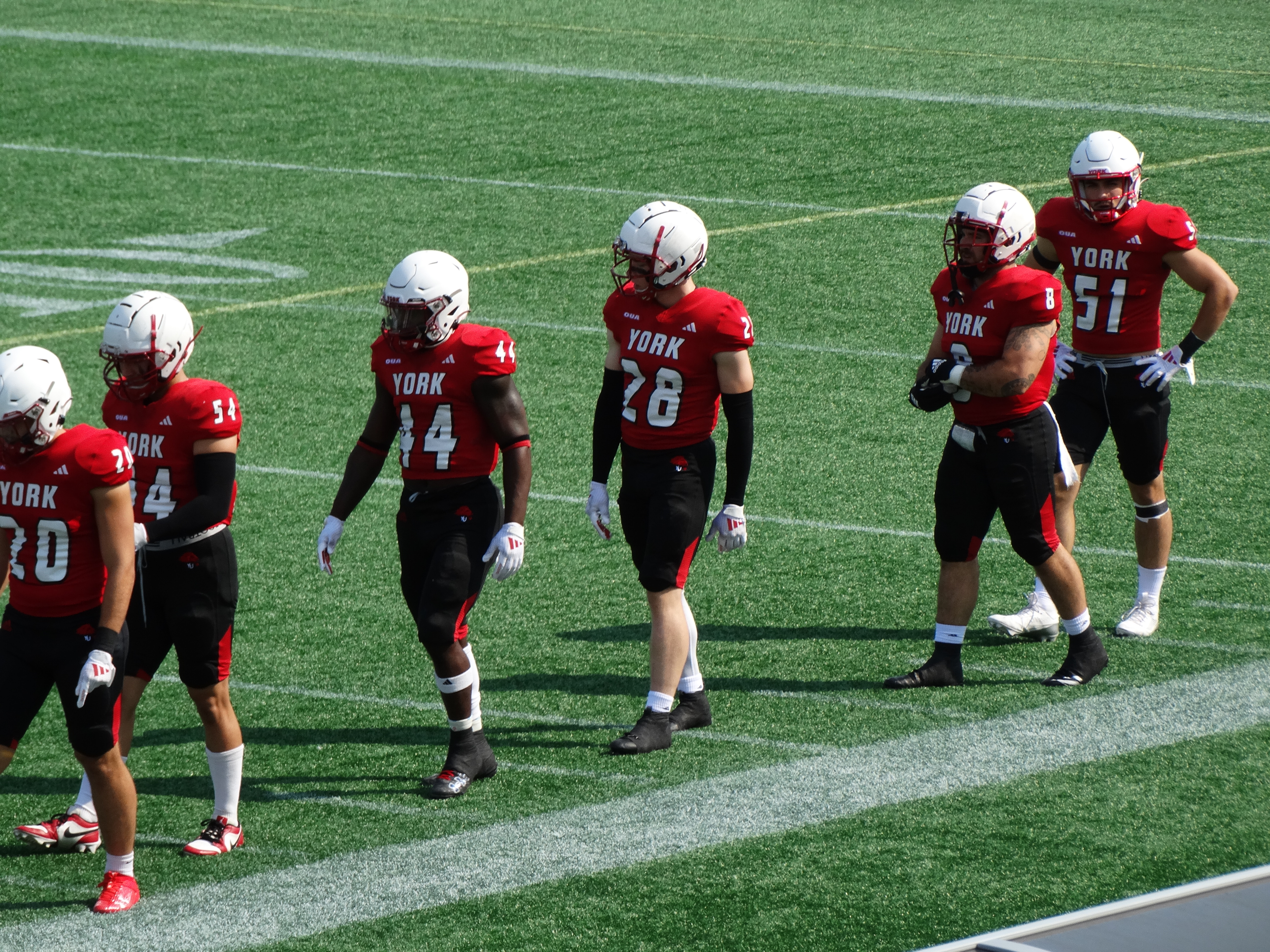
The York Lions during warm-ups (09/14/2024).

=== Dexter Janke era (2024–present) ===
==== 2024 season ====
On January 22, 2024, York announced the former head coach of the CJFL's Westshore Rebels and former CFLer Dexter Janke as the program's 12th head coach. Janke was the 2023 CJFL coach of the year following a perfect regular season and set various offensive and defensive records in the CJFL. On March 28, 2024, York named former McMaster Marauders head coach Greg Knox as the teams' new defensive coordinator and on June 11, the team hired Rick Walters as their new offensive coordinator, who was with the Alberta Golden Bears from 2019 to 2023.

York started the season with a 0–3 start, but showed much improvement from the year before. In their fourth game against the Toronto Varsity Blues, York won 19–17; snapping a 17-game losing streak (26-game streak when ignoring their forfeit win vs. McMaster in 2022). The winning touchdown came early in the fourth quarter when slotback Avontae McKoy broke off a 75-yard touchdown run putting the score at 18–11 before a Nathan Walker rouge made it 19–11. Toronto responded with a touchdown from quarterback Kaleb O'Donahue to wide receiver Dane Hurley with 36 seconds remaining, but failed the two-point convert and did not recover the ensuing onside kick.

York would get their second win of the season in week 7 against the Waterloo Warriors beating them 39–24; giving York its first multi-win season in six years and their first win at York Lions Stadium since it became the team's venue in 2021. In week 9, York had a 2–5 record and found itself an opportunity to qualify for the postseason for the first time in 20 years if they were to beat the McMaster Marauders in their final game (with the Laurier Golden Hawks and Ottawa Gee-Gees needing to win their final games to give York an advantage in tie-breakers) to take the 7th playoff seed. Unfortunately, York lost a close game 24–21 to finish the year with a 2–6 record.

Despite the finish, the Lions were a much better team than they were in 2023 finishing with an average of 16.4 points for and 28.6 points against for their games in 2024 with a point differential of −99; their lowest since 2012 where it was −82. The Lions also had two OUA second-team all-stars in Linebackers Peyton Ryder and Brody Clark, both of whom were among the leading tacklers in the country (55.5 and 61 tackles respectively).

==== 2025 season ====
On January 10, 2025, York announced the hiring of Eli Haynes from the CJFL's Okanagan Sun as the new Special Teams Coordinator; replacing Brian Jones from the role. As well, the Lions would bring in Frantz Clarkson as their new offensive coordinator to replace Rick Walters, and brought back Tommy Denison as a Senior Offensive consultant.

The Lions would also bring in over 60 recruits during the offseason with some notable transfers. On March 13, York announced that McMaster Marauders starting quarterback and OUA second-team all-star, Keagan Hall, was grad-transferring to the Lions and able to play immediately as he would enter York in a Master's program. As well, York would bring in Ole Miss transfer Defensive End Jaden Dicks as another notable transfer.

==== 2026 season ====
On December 5, 2025, it was announced that Jamie Cook, formerly the co-offensive coordinator, passing game coordinator, and quarterbacks coach of the Toronto Varsity Blues, was hired as the Lions' offensive coordinator for the 2026 season. On May 28, 2026, it was announced that Fraser Sopik had been hired as the team's special teams coordinator.

== Season-by-season record ==
The following is the record of the York Lions football team since their inception in 1968:

Season	Games	Won	Lost	PCT	PF	PA	Standing	Playoffs
1968	6	4	2	0.667	121	94	N/A	N/A; not a member of CIAU during this season
1969	6	1	5	0.167	58	157		Did not qualify
1970	7	0	7	0.000	26	204		Did not qualify
1971	8	1	7	0.125	100	172		Did not qualify
1972	6	1	5	0.167	52	128		Did not qualify
1973	8	1	7	0.125	108	238		Did not qualify
1974	7	0	7	0.000	103	293		Did not qualify
1975	7	1	6	0.143	69	227		Did not qualify
1976	7	0	7	0.000	36	251		Did not qualify
1977	7	0	7	0.000	37	202		Did not qualify
1978	7	4	3	0.571	84	104		Did not qualify
1979	6	3	3	0.500	101	77		Did not qualify
1980	7	3	4	0.429	149	193		Did not qualify
1981	7	2	5	0.286	102	210		Did not qualify
1982	7	2	5	0.286	119	304		Did not qualify
1983	7	1	6	0.143	124	190		Did not qualify
1984	7	5	2	0.714	175	112		Lost to Western Mustangs in semi-final 30–25
1985	7	5	2	0.714	191	121		Lost to Laurier Golden Hawks in semi-final 27–10
1986	7	3	4	0.429	109	132		Did not qualify
1987	7	2	5	0.289	125	200		Did not qualify
1988	7	1	6	0.143	65	192		Did not qualify
1989	7	0	7	0.000	50	236		Did not qualify
1990	7	0	7	0.000	41	261		Did not qualify
1991	7	0	7	0.000	67	305		Did not qualify
1992	7	0	7	0.000	81	231		Did not qualify
1993	7	0	7	0.000	87	220		Did not qualify
1994	7	0	7	0.000	88	218		Did not qualify
1995	8	4	4	0.500	115	172	5th in OUA	Did not qualify
1996	8	4	4	0.500	159	154	5th in OUA	Did not qualify
1997	8	6	2	0.750	209	129	4th in OUA	Lost to Waterloo Warriors in semi-final 17–0
1998	8	3	5	0.250	118	155	6th in OUA	Did not qualify
1999	8	2	6	0.250	175	163	6th in OUA	Did not qualify
2000	8	3	5	0.375	99	205	6th in OUA	Did not qualify
2001	8	3	5	0.375	153	216	8th in OUA	Lost to McMaster Marauders in quarter-final 62–0
2002	8	5	3	0.625	121	112	4th in OUA	Defeated Ottawa Gee-Gees in quarter-final 12–4; Lost to McMaster Marauders in semi-final 29–14
2003	8	3	5	0.375	161	251	7th in OUA	Lost to Queen's Golden Gaels in quarter-final 27–6
2004	8	3	5	0.375	220	237	6th in OUA	Lost to Western Mustangs in quarter-final 54–18
2005	8	3	5	0.375	113	294	8th in OUA	Did not qualify
2006	8	1	7	0.125	134	224	9th in OUA	Did not qualify
2007	8	1	7	0.125	90	279	9th in OUA	Did not qualify
2008	8	0	8	0.000	32	471	10th in OUA	Did not qualify
2009	8	0	8	0.000	97	414	10th in OUA	Did not qualify
2010	8	0	8	0.000	73	416	9th in OUA	Did not qualify
2011	8	1	7	0.125	90	241	9th in OUA	Did not qualify
2012	8	2	6	0.250	192	274	7th in OUA	Did not qualify
2013	8	2	6	0.250	179	332	8th in OUA	Did not qualify
2014	8	0	8	0.000	63	382	11th in OUA	Did not qualify
2015	8	1	7	0.125	121	367	10th in OUA	Did not qualify
2016	8	2	6	0.250	171	384	9th in OUA	Did not qualify
2017	8	1	7	0.125	163	340	10th in OUA	Did not qualify
2018	8	3	5	0.375	172	297	9th in OUA	Did not qualify
2019	8	1	7	0.125	122	272	11th in OUA	Did not qualify
2020	Season cancelled due to COVID-19 pandemic							
2021	6	0	6	0.000	49	201	5th in OUA East	Did not qualify
2022	8	1	7	0.125	43	317	11th in OUA	Did not qualify
2023	8	0	8	0.000	42	560	11th in OUA	Did not qualify
2024	8	2	6	0.250	131	230	9th in OUA	Did not qualify
2025	8	2	6	0.250	210	327	10th in OUA	Did not qualify
2026	8	3	5	0.375	138	272	9th in OUA	Did not qualify

== Head coaches ==
Name	Years	Record
Nobby Wirkowski	1968–1975	9–46 (.163)
Dick Aldridge	1976–1977	0–14 (.000)
Frank Cosentino	1978–1980	10–10 (.500)
Dave Pickett	1981–1983	5–16 (.238)
Frank Cosentino/Nobby Wirkowski	1984–1987	15–15 (.500)
Nobby Wirkowski	1988–1989	1–13 (.071)
Tom Arnott	1990–2000	22–58 (.379)
Tom Gretes	2001–2006	19–34 (.386)
Andy McEvoy (Interim)	2007	1–7 (.125)
Mike McLean	2008–2009	0–16 (.000)
Warren Craney	2010–2022	14–80 (.149)
Nathaniel Griffith/Brian Jones (Interim)	2023	0–8 (.000)
Dexter Janke	2024–present	7–17 (.292)

== Team records ==
All records are as of 2022

=== Passing ===
Record	Name	Number	Season(s)
Career Passing Yards	Brett Hunchak	8287	2015–19
Season Passing Yards	Keagan Hall	2468	2025
Career Passing TDs	Brett Hunchak	34	2015–19
Season Passing TDs	Billy Barbosa	14	1999
Career Completions	Brett Hunchak	680	2015–19
Season Completions	Brett Hunchak	201	2018

=== Rushing ===
Record	Name	Number	Season(s)
Career Rushing Yards	Jeff Johnson	3358	1996–99
Season Rushing Yards	Andre Durie	1367	2004
Career Rushing TDs	Andre Durie	24	2003–05
Season Rushing TDs	Andre Durie	15	2004
Average Yards per Carry (Min 150 Carries)	Andre Durie	9.1	2003–05

=== Receiving ===
Record	Name	Number	Season(s)
Career Reception Yards	Andre Batson	2186	1993–97
Season Reception Yards	Brian Nugent	694	1999
Career Reception TDs	Andre Batson	19	1993–97
Season Reception TDs	Brian Nugent	9	1999
Career Receptions	Colton Hunchak	162	2015–18
Season Receptions	Colton Hunchak	58	2018
Average Yards per Catch	Steve Ince	19.5	1971–73

=== Defense ===
Record	Name	Number	Season(s)
Career Interceptions	Neil Maki	16	1999–03
Season Interceptions	Neil Maki	6	2000

=== Scoring ===
Record	Name	Number	Season(s)
Career Points	Roy Venier	218	1996–97, 1999, 2001
Season Points	Andre Durie	96	2004
Career Touchdowns	Andre Batson	26	1993–97
Season Touchdowns	Andre Durie	16	2004

=== Kicking ===
Record	Name	Number	Season(s)
Career Punt Yards	Nathan Walker	11486	2022-2026
Season Punt Yards	Dror David	3220	2011
Career Punt Average (Min 100 Att)	Nathan Walker	40.9	2022-2026
Season Punt Average (Min 60 Att)	Nathan Walker	45.9	2026
Career Field Goals Made	Roy Venier	50	1996–97, 1999, 2001
Season Field Goals Made	Mike Boyd/Roy Venier/Sergio Capobanco	14 (Tie)	1984/1997/1980

=== Returns ===
Record	Name	Number	Season(s)
Career Punt Return Yards	Andre Batson	1460	1996–99
Season Punt Return Yards	Greg McDonald	521	1987
Career Kick Return Yards	Alfred Olay	1706	2018–24
Season Kick Return Yards	Alfred Olay	903	2023

== Rivalry ==
Since the 1970s, the Lions have maintained a football rivalry with the University of Toronto. The teams face one another in an annual football match known as the Red and Blue Bowl, where the winner is presented with the Argo Cup, donated in 1992 by the Toronto Argonauts. York's longest stretch of dominance began in 1996 when the Lions won their first of 12 consecutive matches, which ended after their 2007 victory.

== National award winners ==
- Jeff Johnson – Peter Gorman Trophy (1996)
- Jacob Janke – Russ Jackson Award (2019)

== York Lions in the professional ranks ==
As of the start of the 2026 CFL season, two former Lions players were on CFL teams' rosters:

- Brody Clark, Winnipeg Blue Bombers
- Chris Kolankowski, Hamilton Tiger-Cats

As of the end of the 2025 NFL season, one former Lions player was on an NFL team's roster:

- Nikola Kalinic, Chicago Bears

=== Lions alumni ===
Since 2014, multiple former Lions players have been drafted or signed by professional teams including:

- Brody Clark (2026–present): Winnipeg
- Nathan Walker (2026*): Toronto
- Jason Janvier-Messier (2024–2025): Calgary
- Evan Anseeuw (2024*): Edmonton
- Matt Dean (2023): Saskatchewan
- Daniel Amoako (2022–2024): Calgary
- Luther Hakunavanhu (2021–2025): Calgary, Hamilton, Ottawa
- Kayden Johnson (2020*): BC
- Rossini Sandjong (2020–2022): Edmonton, Winnipeg
- Damian Jamieson (2020–2021*): BC
- Nikola Kalinic (2019–present): Hamilton, Indianapolis, Los Angeles, Atlanta, Chicago
- Jacob Janke (2019–2021, 2023*): Saskatchewan, Winnipeg
- Colton Hunchak (2019–2024): Calgary, Saskatchewan
- Samson Abbott (2019–2020*): Ottawa
- Christopher Smith (2018*): Saskatchewan
- Jamal Campbell (2016–2023): Toronto, Saskatchewan, Calgary
- Chris Kolankowski (2016–present): Toronto, Winnipeg, Hamilton
- James Tuck (2014–2024): Montreal, Winnipeg, Toronto, Edmonton, Saskatchewan, Hamilton
