= Circelli =

Circelli is an Italian surname. Notable people with the surname include:

- Anthony Circelli (born 1961), Italian ice hockey player
- Collin Circelli (born 1981), Canadian professional ice hockey center
- Corey Circelli (born 2002), Canadian figure skater
- Jean-Paul Circelli, head coach for the University of Windsor's football team, the Windsor Lancers
- Nancy Circelli Kominsky (1915–2011), Italian-American artist and television presenter
