= Kennedy Institute =

Kennedy Institute may refer to:

- Edward M. Kennedy Institute for the United States Senate, an educational institution and museum in Boston, Massachusetts
- Kennedy Institute of Ethics, an academic think tank at Georgetown University
- Kennedy Institute of Ethics Journal, an academic journal
- Kennedy Institute of Rheumatology, Oxford, UK
- Kennedy Collegiate Institute, a secondary school in Ontario, Canada
- John F. Kennedy School of Government, a public policy school at Harvard University

== See also ==
- Kennedy Krieger Institute
