= Andre Durie =

Canadian football player (born 1981)

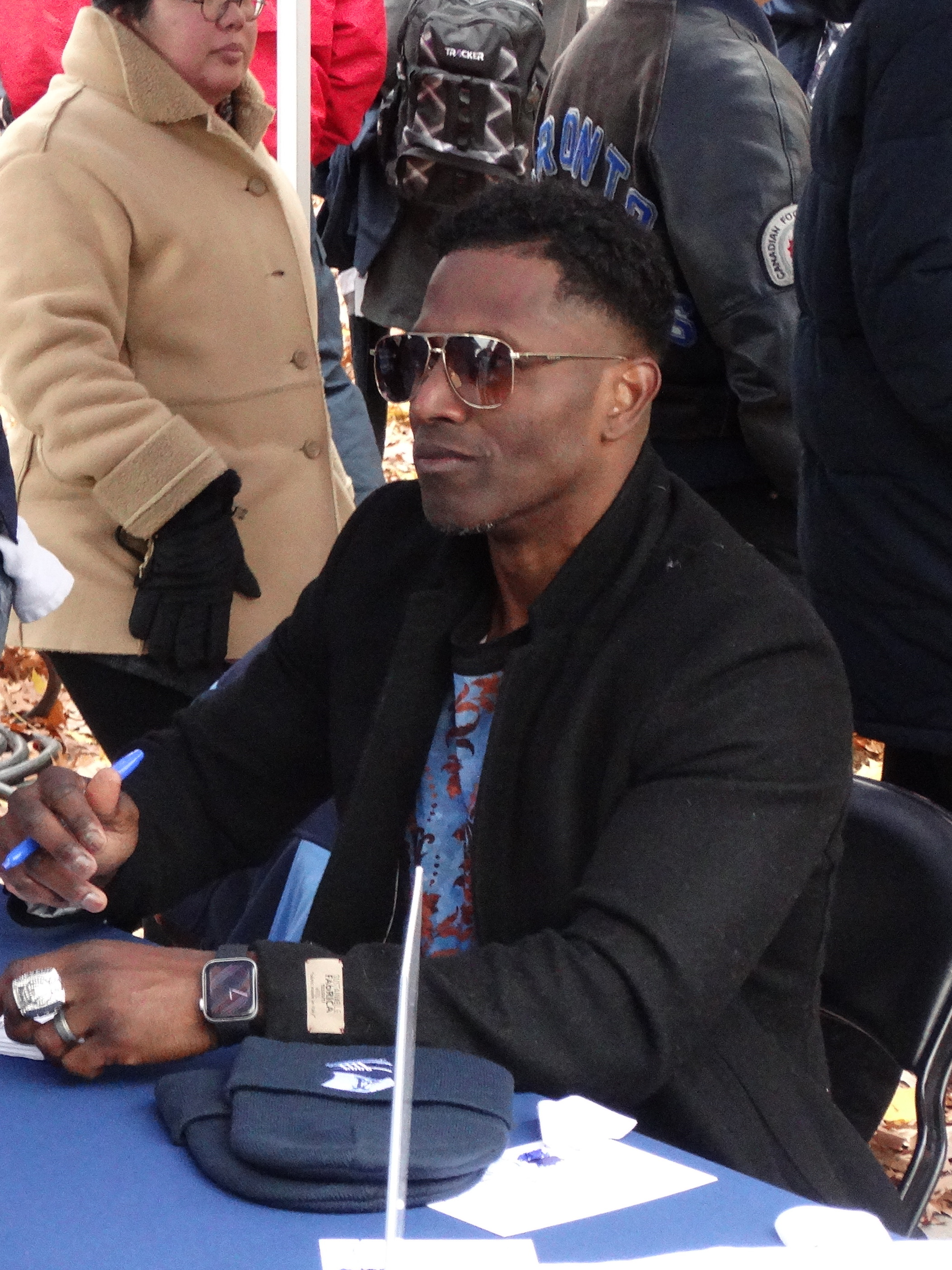
- Durie in 2022

Profile
- Positions: Running back, slotback

Personal information
- Born: July 27, 1981 (age 45); Mississauga, Ontario, Canada
- Listed height: 5 ft 7 in (1.70 m)
- Listed weight: 190 lb (86 kg)

Career information
- University: York
- CFL draft: 2007: undrafted

Career history
- 2007–2016: Toronto Argonauts

Awards and highlights
- Grey Cup champion (2012); CFL East All-Star (2013)
- Stats at CFL.ca

Andre Durie (born July 27, 1981) is a Canadian former professional football running back/slotback who played for the Toronto Argonauts of the Canadian Football League (CFL) from 2007 to 2016. He signed with the Argonauts on May 10, 2007, as a free agent after he went undrafted in the 2007 CFL draft. He played CIS football for the York Lions.

== University career ==
Durie played CIS football for York University in Toronto. He started playing for the York Lions in 2003 after he set a junior Ontario Varsity Football League record with 22 touchdowns in a season. In 2004, Durie had a record-breaking season starting eight games at running back and set an Ontario University Athletics record for single game rushing yards with 349 and single-season York records for rushing yards (1,367), scoring (96 points), and rushing touchdowns (15), and a career York record for rushing touchdowns (23). Durie also tied a CIS single-game record with six touchdowns to lead York to a 55–33 win over Waterloo.

In the second game of the 2005 season he suffered nerve damage in his knee after a botched juke on third down and sat out the remainder of the 2005 and 2006 seasons.

== Professional career ==
After overcoming injuries that hurt his CIS career, Durie impressed the Argonauts management at the league evaluation camp and he appeared in 5 games for the Argos in 2007. After suffering another injury setback which has cost Durie more than half of the 2008 season he returned to action on special teams and as back-up running back.

In 2009, Durie dressed for all 18 games including weeks 1-5 as backup running back. In week 6 he made the switch to slotback and has remained in that role since, although still a backup. In this same season, he attained a 1000-yard kickoff return season, becoming the fourth Argonaut to do so, with 43 returns for 1033 yards. In the 2010 season, Durie won a job in the starting lineup as a RB/SB, but sees most of his touches as a receiver.

In 2012, Durie won his first Grey Cup, defeating the Calgary Stampeders, scoring a touchdown in the 35–22 win. Durie had his best receiving season of his career during the 2013 CFL season, setting career highs in receptions with 92 and yards with 986. Following the 2013 season, Durie re-signed with the Argos through the 2016 CFL season, a deal that was reportedly worth around $140,000 annually.
