= Greg Hetherington =

Canadian football player (born 1983)

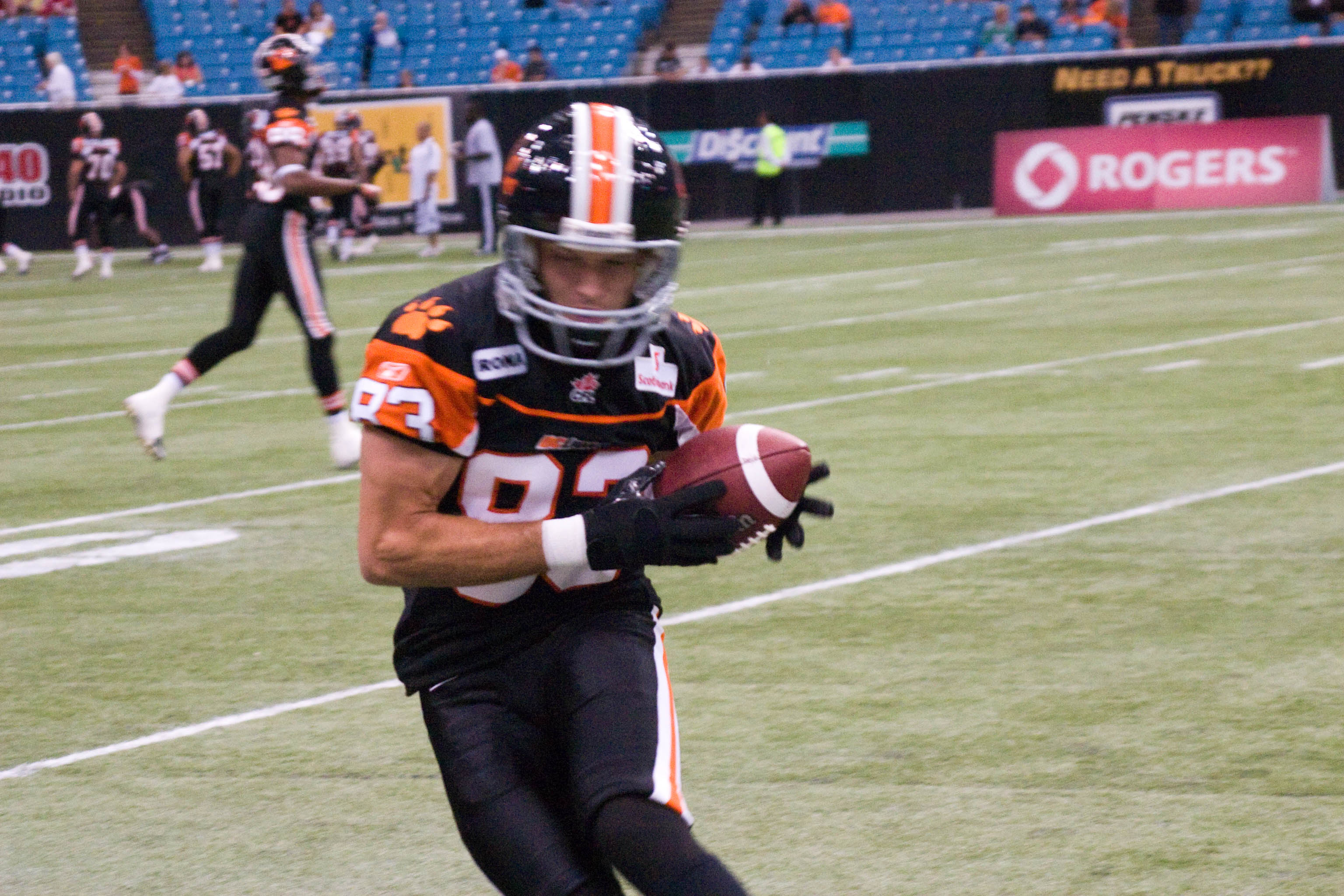
- Hetherington in 2009

Profile
- Position: Slotback

Personal information
- Born: May 10, 1983 (age 43); Toronto, Ontario, Canada
- Listed height: 6 ft 4 in (1.93 m)
- Listed weight: 220 lb (100 kg)

Career information
- University: McGill University
- CFL draft: 2007: 6th round, 46th overall pick

Career history
- 2007: Calgary Stampeders
- 2008–2009: BC Lions
- Stats at CFL.ca

Greg Hetherington (born May 10, 1983) is a Canadian former professional football slotback. He most recently played for the BC Lions of the Canadian Football League. He was drafted by the Calgary Stampeders in the sixth round of the 2007 CFL draft. He played CIS Football for the McGill Redmen.
