= Tad Crawford =

Canadian football player (born 1984)

No. 1
- Position: Safety

Personal information
- Born: April 16, 1984 (age 42); Burlington, Ontario, Canada
- Listed height: 6 ft 3 in (1.91 m)
- Listed weight: 194 lb (88 kg)

Career information
- High school: M. M. Robinson
- College: Columbia
- CFL draft: 2007: 3rd round, 17th overall pick

Career history
- 2007–2010: BC Lions
- 2011: Montreal Alouettes
- Stats at CFL.ca

Tad Crawford (born April 16, 1984) is a Canadian former professional football safety in the Montreal Alouettes of the Canadian Football League. He was drafted in the third round of the 2007 CFL draft by the BC Lions. He played college football at Columbia. He played for the BC Lions from 2007 until 2010. He signed with the Alouettes as a free agent in February 2011.
