= Bill Hatanaka =

Canadian football player (born 1954)

No. 16, 10
- Position: Wide receiver

Personal information
- Born: May 3, 1954 (age 72); Bathurst, New Brunswick, Canada
- Listed height: 5 ft 11 in (1.80 m)
- Listed weight: 172 lb (78 kg)

Career information
- University: York
- CFL draft: 1976: 1st round, 6th overall pick

Career history
- 1976–1978: Ottawa Rough Riders
- 1979: Hamilton Tiger-Cats

Awards and highlights
- Grey Cup champion (1976)

William Hatanaka (born May 3, 1954) is a Canadian former professional football wide receiver who played four seasons in the Canadian Football League (CFL) with the Ottawa Rough Riders and Hamilton Tiger-Cats. He was selected by the Rough Riders in the first round of the 1976 CFL draft after playing CIAU football at York University. He was a member of the Rough Riders team that won the 64th Grey Cup, where he scored the first punt return touchdown in Grey Cup history.

== Early life ==
William Hatanaka was born on May 3, 1954, in Bathurst, New Brunswick, Canada, to a Japanese-Canadian mother, and a Scottish and Métis father. His father was a professional boxer who died in a plane crash before Hatanaka was born. His mother later married a Japanese-Canadian man. His parents spent time in an internment camp during the internment of Japanese Canadians during World War II.

== University career ==
Hatanaka played CIS football for the York Lions of York University. He earned OUAA all-star honors while with the Lions. He graduated with honours from York in 1977 with a Bachelor of Arts in sociology and economics. He was inducted into the school's athletics hall of fame in 2001.

== Professional career ==
Hatanaka was selected by the Ottawa Rough Riders in the first round, with the sixth overall pick, of the 1976 CFL draft. He played in five games during his rookie year in 1976, returning 15 punts for 173 yards and nine kickoffs for 211 yards. On November 28, 1976, he returned a punt 79 yards for a touchdown in the 64th Grey Cup against the Saskatchewan Roughriders. The Ottawa Rough Riders went on to win by a score of 23–20. Hatanaka's punt return touchdown was the first in Grey Cup history. He appeared in 15 games for the Rough Riders in 1977, recording 20 receptions for 318 yards and two touchdowns, 42 punt returns for 441 yards, and 23 kickoff returns for 576 yards. The Rough Riders finished the 1977 season with an 8–8 record. Hatanaka played in six games during the 1978 season, totaling one catch for eight yards, six kickoff returns for 115 yards, and 11 punt returns for 36 yards.

Hatanaka appeared in four games for the Hamilton Tiger-Cats of the CFL in 1979, returning nine kickoffs for 224 yards and 16 punts for 69 yards.

== Post-football career ==
Hatanaka attended the Advanced Management Program at Harvard Business School, and has served on the Board of Governors at York University. He has also served as the chair of the board of directors for the government agency Ontario Health. He has been the chief operating officer of wealth management at the Royal Bank of Canada, a senior executive in charge of global wealth and asset management at Toronto-Dominion Bank (TD Bank), and the inaugural chair of TD Bank's diversity leadership council.
