= Adam Nicolson (Canadian football) =

Canadian football player (born 1984)

Profile
- Position: Wide receiver

Personal information
- Born: August 13, 1984 (age 42); North Bay, Ontario
- Listed height: 6 ft 4 in (1.93 m)
- Listed weight: 219 lb (99 kg)

Career information
- University: University of Ottawa
- CFL draft: 2007: 1st round, 8th overall pick

Career history
- 2007: British Columbia Lions
- 2008–2009: Saskatchewan Roughriders
- 2010: Hamilton Tiger-Cats
- Stats at CFL.ca (archive)

Adam Nicolson (born August 13, 1984) is a former wide receiver in the CFL. He wore the number 84, weighed 219 lbs. and is 6'4 tall. Nicolson attended the University of Ottawa and played for the Ottawa Gee-Gees. From 2004 to 2006, he played in 19 games, in which Nicolson had 88 catches for 1572 yards. He also scored 12 touchdowns. In his playoff career, Nicolson averaged 69 receiving yards per game. During the 2006 Mitchell Bowl, he had 6 catches for 109 yards and a touchdown versus the Saskatchewan Huskies. The Gee-Gees would lose the game, though. Nicolson was selected by the Lions in the first round (eighth overall) in the 2007 CFL draft.
