= Colton Hunchak =

Canadian gridiron football player (born 1997)

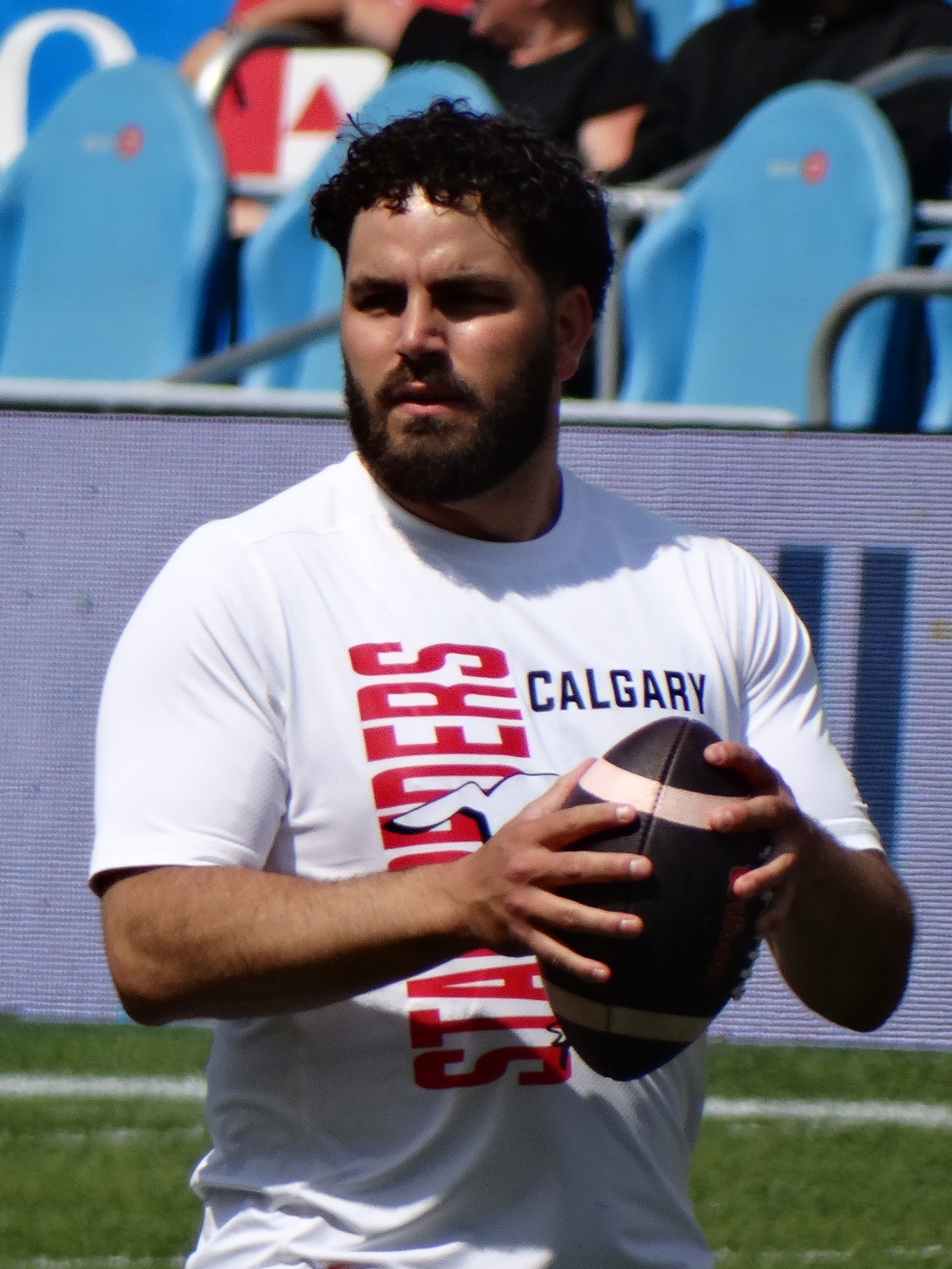
- Hunchak with the Calgary Stampeders in 2025

Calgary Stampeders
- Position: Wide receiver
- Roster status: Active
- CFL status: National

Personal information
- Born: September 25, 1997 (age 29); Calgary, Alberta, Canada
- Listed height: 5 ft 11 in (1.80 m)
- Listed weight: 212 lb (96 kg)

Career information
- High school: Notre Dame
- University: York
- CFL draft: 2019: 8th round, 73rd overall pick

Career history

Playing
- 2019–2023: Calgary Stampeders
- 2024: Saskatchewan Roughriders

Coaching
- 2025–present: Calgary Stampeders
- Stats at CFL.ca

Colton Hunchak (born September 25, 1997) is a Canadian former professional football wide receiver who is the offensive and special teams assistant coach for the Calgary Stampeders of the Canadian Football League (CFL).

== University career ==
Hunchak played U Sports football for the York Lions from 2015 to 2018.

== Professional career ==
=== Calgary Stampeders ===
Hunchak was drafted with the last selection, 73rd overall, in the 2019 CFL draft by the Calgary Stampeders and signed with the team on May 13, 2019. He played in 28 games in his first two seasons catching 16 passes in both seasons, for a combined total of 478 yards. He re-signed with the Calgary Stampeders on January 6, 2021. In his third season in the league, Hunchak played in 14 games and contributed with six receptions for 69 yards.

Hunchak and the Stampeders agreed to another contract extension on December 15, 2022. He played in just eight games in 2023 where he had seven receptions for 59 yards. He became a free agent upon the expiry of his contract on February 13, 2024. He remained unsigned at the start of training camp in 2024, but was re-signed by the Stampeders on May 29, 2024, following a season-ending injury to fellow receiver Malik Henry. However, he was part of the final training camp cuts on June 1, 2024.

=== Saskatchewan Roughriders ===
On September 24, 2024, it was announced that Hunchak had signed with the Saskatchewan Roughriders. He played in three regular season games where he had three catches for 31 yards. He became a free agent upon the expiry of his contract on February 11, 2025.

== Coaching career ==
On April 22, 2025, it was announced that Hunchak had joined the coaching staff of the Calgary Stampeders as a special teams and offensive assistant.
