= Muftah Ageli =

Canadian football player (born 2003)

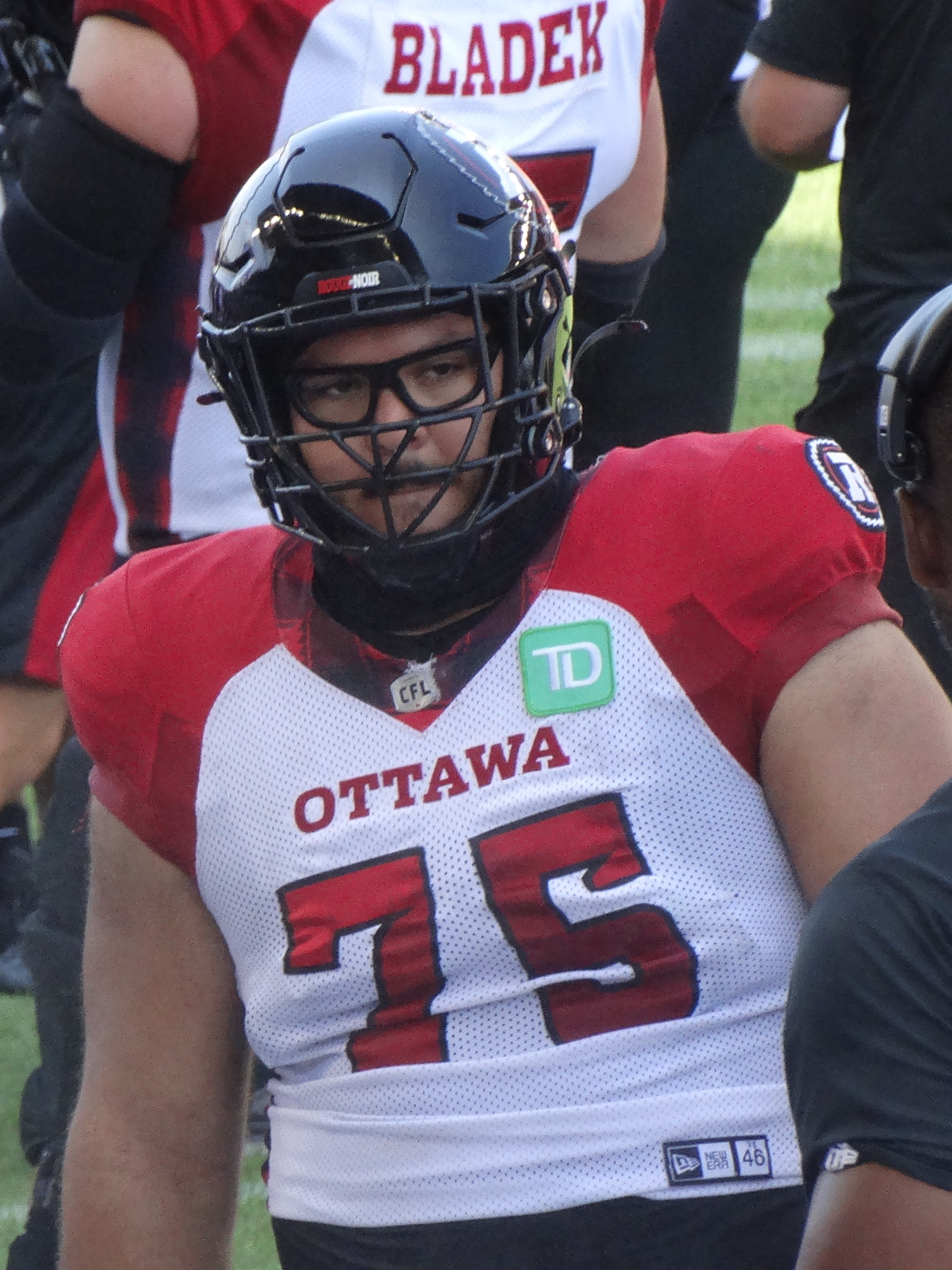
- Ageli with the Ottawa Redblacks in 2025

No. 75 – Ottawa Redblacks
- Position: Defensive lineman
- Roster status: Active
- CFL status: National

Personal information
- Born: July 14, 2003 (age 23)
- Listed height: 6 ft 0 in (1.83 m)
- Listed weight: 298 lb (135 kg)

Career information
- High school: W. C. Kennedy (Windsor, Ontario)
- College: Northwestern Oklahoma State (2024)
- University: Windsor (2021–2023)
- CFL draft: 2025: 4th round, 33rd overall pick

Career history
- Ottawa Redblacks (2025–present)

Awards and highlights
- Second-team All-Canadian (2023); First-team OUA All-Star (2023); Second-team OUA All-Star (2022); Third-team All-GAC (2024)
- Stats at CFL.ca

Muftah Ageli (born July 14, 2003) is a Canadian professional football defensive lineman for the Ottawa Redblacks of the Canadian Football League (CFL). He played U Sports football at Windsor and college football at Northwestern Oklahoma State.

== Early life ==
Muftah Ageli was born on July 14, 2003, in Canada to Libyan immigrants. Two weeks before he was born, his parents moved from Dearborn, Michigan, to Windsor, Ontario. For high school, he first attended Vincent Massey Secondary School in Windsor. Ageli first played football in grade 9. However, he did not receive very much playing time and quit the team to instead focus on basketball. He later transferred to Honourable W. C. Kennedy Collegiate in Windsor, where he played football again in grade 11. Ageli's grade 12 season was cancelled due to the COVID-19 pandemic.

== University and college career ==
=== Windsor ===
Ageli played U Sports football for the Windsor Lancers of the University of Windsor from 2021 to 2023. He played in six games as a true freshman in 2021, posting seven solo tackles, eight assisted tackles, and 0.5 sacks. Recalling his first year, Ageli later said "I was playing a game I didn’t understand at all. I couldn’t even tell you what a blitz was." He lived at home 15 minutes away from campus while attending the University of Windsor. During his second year, Ageli tried to get defensive coordinator Patrick Donovan to convince Ageli's parents, who did not fully understand Canadian football, to allow Ageli to move onto campus to commit more time to football. Donovan met Ageli's parents and told them Ageli might eventually "make money playing this game". However, he was not allowed to move out of the house.

Ageli appeared in nine games during the 2022 season, recording 11 solo tackles, 11 assisted tackles, one sack, one forced fumble, two pass breakups, and one reception for a one-yard touchdown. Ageli earned second-team OUA All-Star honors for his performance during the 2022 season. He played in ten games in 2023, totaling 22 solo tackles, 21 assisted tackles, 5.5 sacks, one fumble recovery, two pass breakups, and one interception that he returned five yards for a touchdown, earning second-team All-Canadian and a first-team OUA All-Star honors.

=== Northwestern Oklahoma State ===
In 2024, Ageli transferred to Northwestern Oklahoma State University to play college football for the Northwestern Oklahoma State Rangers. He played in ten games during the 2024 season, recording 12 solo tackles, 22 assisted tackles, one sack, one pass breakup, and one interception that he returned 20 yards for a touchdown, garnering third-team All-Great American Conference recognition.

== Professional career ==
At Eastern Michigan's pro day in March 2025, Ageli posted 33 repetitions of 225 pounds on the bench press. His 33 reps were more than any lineman at the 2025 NFL Combine. On April 10, 2025, he worked out for the Detroit Lions at their local day.

Ageli was selected by the Ottawa Redblacks in the fourth round, with the 33rd overall pick, of the 2025 CFL draft. He officially signed with the team on May 1, 2025. He was moved to the practice roster on June 1, promoted to the active roster on June 17, placed on the one-game injured list on June 28, activated from the injured list on July 19, and moved back to the practice roster on August 21, 2025.

== Personal life ==
Ageli is a Muslim.
