= Windsor Lancers football =

University Canadian football team

Windsor Lancers
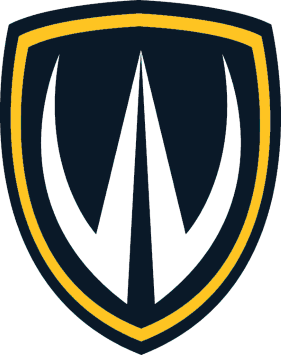
- Windsor Lancers logo
- First season: 1968; 58 years ago
- Athletic director: Stephanie White
- Head coach: Jean-Paul Circelli; 7th year, 29–25 (.537)
- Other staff: Joe Circelli (OC); Patrick Donovan (DC); Bryant Johnson (Director of Football Operations)
- Home stadium: University of Windsor Stadium
- Year built: 2005
- Stadium capacity: 4,500
- Stadium surface: FieldTurf
- Location: Windsor, Ontario
- League: U Sports
- Conference: OUA (1980–present)
- Past associations: CCIFC (1968–1970); OUAA (1971–1973); OQIFC (1974–1979)
- All-time record: –
- Postseason record: –

Titles
- Vanier Cups: 0
- Yates Cups: 1; 1975
- Hec Crighton winners: 3 Andrew Parici, Scott Mallender, Daryl Stephenson
- Colours: Blue and Gold
- Outfitter: Under Armour
- Rivals: Western Mustangs
- Website: golancers.ca

The Windsor Lancers football team represents the University of Windsor in Windsor, Ontario in the sport of Canadian football in the Ontario University Athletics conference of U Sports. The Windsor Lancers football team has been in continuous operation since 1968. The team won its only Yates Cup conference championship in 1975 as winners of the OQIFC West Division. The program is one of six currently in U Sports football that have not appeared in a Vanier Cup game. The Lancers have had three Hec Crighton Trophy winners, with Andrew Parici in 1972, Scott Mallender, in 1979, and Daryl Stephenson in 2006.

== Recent history ==
The football team was led by head coach Joe D'Amore from 2011 to 2018. D'Amore was named the OUA Football Coach of the Year in 2011 and led the football program to four consecutive OUA playoff appearances in his first four seasons. Quarterback Austin Kennedy (2010–14) had an outstanding career for the Lancers as he was a three-time OUA conference all-star, was the OUA career record holder with 79 touchdown passes and became the fourth quarterback in CIS history to pass for more than 10,000 yards. He was also selected as one of the CIS Top Eight Academic All-Canadians for the 2014–15 season. Following four consecutive seasons in the playoffs, the Lancers missed the post-season from 2015 to 2018. D'Amore resigned following the 2018 season and Jean-Paul Circelli was hired as his replacement, the fifth head coach in the program's history. Under the guidance of Coach Circelli, the 2022 season saw the Lancers return to the playoffs for the first time in eight years. The Lancers had one player selected in the 2023 CFL draft, Breton MacDougall, who was selected in the sixth round, 53rd overall, by the Winnipeg Blue Bombers.

In 2023, the Lancers had their best season in recent memory, starting the season hot with victories over McMaster, Guelph, Queen's, Ottawa, Waterloo and York, but fell short against rivals Laurier and Western. The Lancers rolled through Carleton in the OUA Quarter Finals. However, the Cinderella story ended in Laurier as the Golden Hawks outlasted the Lancers in the OUA Semi-Finals, which ended on a hotly debated call by the officials. Following the season, the team began to gain notoriety around the league.

Following this incredible season, the Windsor Lancers looked to have a repeat of their success, and similarly began the season, beating Queen's, Carleton, York, Ottawa and Toronto, but stumbled against Guelph and then lost to Laurier and Western to finish off the regular season. Looking to bounce back in the Quarter Finals, the team came out firing but came up short against Queen's in a game that ended on a Hail Mary pass from the Gaels' QB. After the season, the Lancers had a record 5 players drafted into the 2024 CFL draft. Devin Veresuk ended up being the 2nd overall pick to the Hamilton Tiger-Cats, which is the highest pick in Windsor Lancers history. Former Lancers; Liam Hoskins, Joey Zorn, Istvan Assibo-Dadzi, and Muftah Ageli were also drafted.

== Season-by-season record ==
The following is the record of the Windsor Lancers football team since 2000:

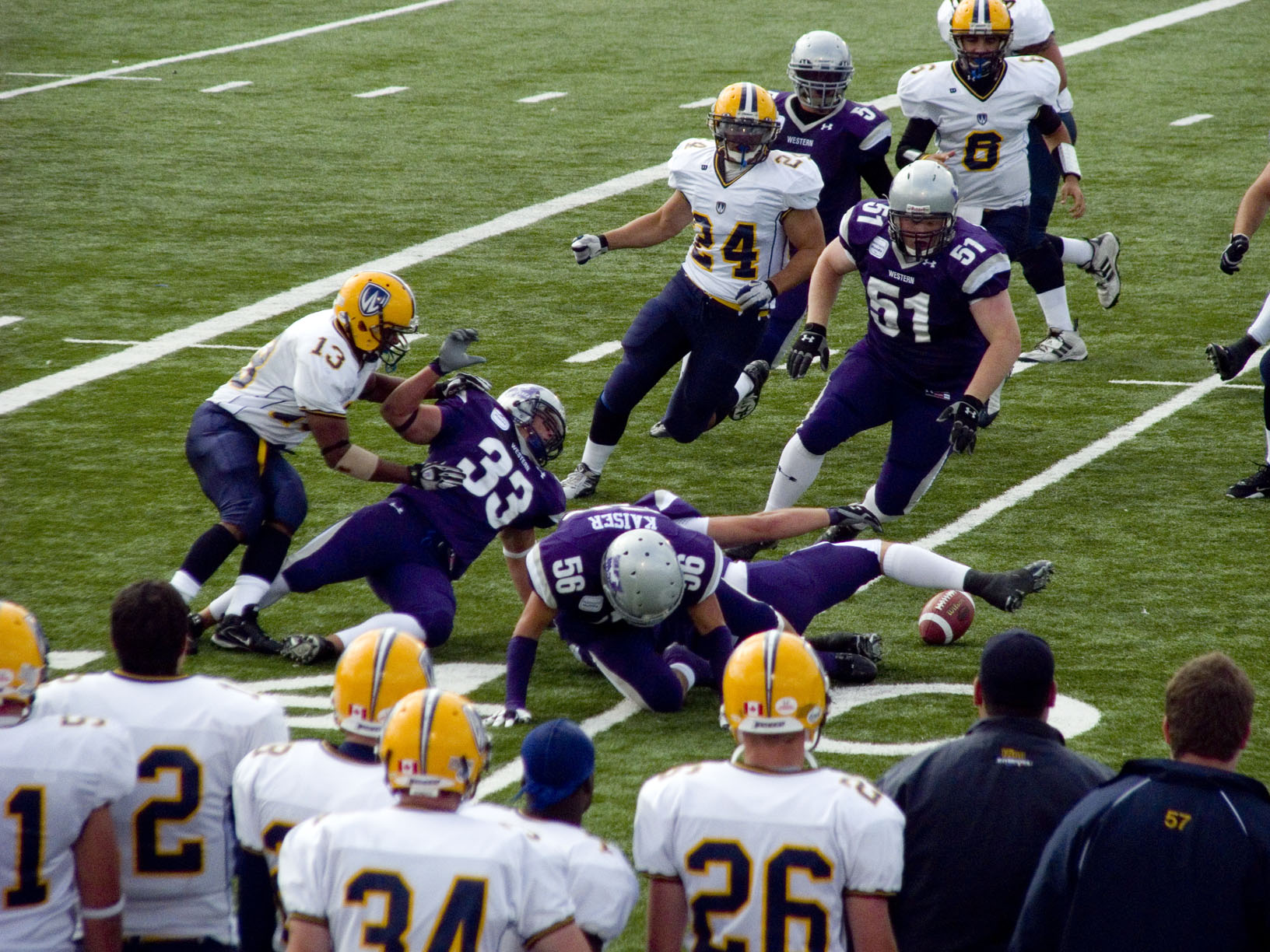
Windsor vs Western game in 2008

Season	Games	W	L	T	PCT	PF	PA	Standing	Playoffs
2000	8	1	7	0	0.125	95	209	7th in OUA	Did not qualify
2001	8	2	6	0	0.250	96	196	9th in OUA	Did not qualify
2002	8	3	5	0	0.375	109	202	6th in OUA	Lost to Western Mustangs in quarter-final 65–10
2003	8	4	4	0	0.500	243	211	5th in OUA	Defeated Western Mustangs in quarter-final 21–18; Lost to McMaster Marauders in semi-final 55–15
2004	8	3	5	0	0.375	201	241	7th in OUA	Did not qualify
2005	8	4	4	0	0.375	250	226	5th in OUA	Lost to McMaster Marauders in quarter-final 49–19
2006	8	6	2	–	0.625	265	167	4th in OUA	Lost to Western Mustangs in quarter-final 20–16
2007	8	2	6	–	0.250	156	261	8th in OUA	Did not qualify
2008	8	3	5	–	0.375	189	254	7th in OUA	Did not qualify
2009	8	2	6	–	0.250	110	244	8th in OUA	Did not qualify
2010	8	2	6	–	0.250	156	261	8th in OUA	Did not qualify
2011	8	5	3	–	0.625	260	174	5th in OUA	Defeated Ottawa Gee-Gees in quarter-final 50–33; Lost to Western Mustangs in semi-final 33–27
2012	8	3	5	–	0.375	230	229	5th in OUA	Lost to Western Mustangs in quarter-final 56–35
2013	8	4	4	–	0.500	269	230	6th in OUA	Lost to Guelph Gryphons in quarter-final 31–21
2014	8	5	3	–	0.625	225	158	4th in OUA	Lost to Ottawa Gee-Gees in quarter-final 46–29
2015	8	2	6	–	0.250	166	315	9th in OUA	Did not qualify
2016	8	2	6	–	0.250	164	380	10th in OUA	Did not qualify
2017	8	1	7	–	0.125	142	362	9th in OUA	Did not qualify
2018	8	1	7	–	0.125	168	292	10th in OUA	Did not qualify
2019	8	1	7	–	0.125	190	342	10th in OUA	Did not qualify
2020	Season cancelled due to COVID-19 pandemic								
2021	6	2	4	–	0.333	67	231	6th in OUA West	Did not qualify
2022	8	4	4	–	0.500	189	194	6th in OUA	Lost to Ottawa Gee-Gees in quarter-final 43–40
2023	8	6	2	–	0.750	256	132	3rd in OUA	Defeated Carleton Ravens in quarter-final 14–11; Lost to Wilfrid Laurier Golden Hawks in semi-final 21–14
2024	8	5	3	–	0.625	216	183	4th in OUA	Lost to Queen's Gaels in quarter-final 22–19
2025	8	5	3	–	0.625	191	155	3rd in OUA	Defeated Ottawa Gee-Gees in quarter-final 31–24; Lost to Queen's Gaels in semi-final 36–25
2026	8	6	2	–	0.750	312	177	4th in OUA	Defeated Guelph Gryphons in quarter-final 28–24; Lost to Western Mustangs in semi-final 43–33

== National postseason results ==
Vanier Cup Era (1965-current)
Year	Game	Opponent	Result
1969	Churchill Bowl	Manitoba	L 7-41
1975	Churchill Bowl	Ottawa	L 6-45

Windsor is 0-2 in national semi-final games and has not appeared in a Vanier Cup.

== Head coaches ==
Name	Years	Notes
Gino Fracas	1968–1986	
John Musselman	1987–1997	
Mike Morencie	1998–2010	
Joe D'Amore	2011–2018	
Jean-Paul Circelli	2019–present	

== National award winners ==
- Hec Crighton Trophy: Andrew Parici (1972), Scott Mallender, (1979), Daryl Stephenson (2006).
- J. P. Metras Trophy: Matt Morencie (2009)

== Windsor Lancers in the CFL ==
At the start of the 2026 CFL season, seven former Lancers players are on CFL teams' rosters:

- Muftah Ageli, Ottawa Redblacks
- Drew Desjarlais, Ottawa Redblacks
- Liam Hoskins, Saskatchewan Roughriders
- Ethan John, Toronto Argonauts
- Weagbe Mombo, Toronto Argonauts
- Liam Talbot, Montreal Alouettes
- George Una, BC Lions
