= Honourable W. C. Kennedy Collegiate =

Honourable W.C. Kennedy Collegiate
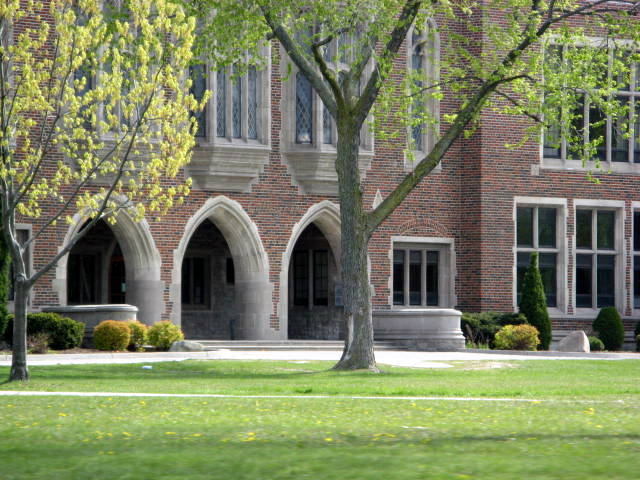

Location
- 245 Tecumseh Road East; Windsor, Ontario, N8X 2R2; Canada; 42.297°N 83.022°W

Information
- School type: High School
- Motto: "Altiora Peto" ("We seek higher things.")
- Founded: 1929
- School board: Greater Essex County District School Board
- Principal: Kyle Berard
- Vice Principal: Stefan Adjetey
- Senior Secretary: Laura Anderson
- Grades: 9 through 12
- Enrollment: 900 (2019/2020)
- Language: English
- Colours: Blue and Gold
- Mascot: Shark
- Team name: Clippers
- Website: www.publicboard.ca/en/kennedy/index.aspx#/=

Honourable W.C. Kennedy Collegiate is a secondary school (grades 9 through 12) located in central Windsor, Ontario, Canada. It is part of the Greater Essex County District School Board (GECDSB).

== Facility ==
The school is located in the heart of Windsor, Ontario along Tecumseh Road and just east of Ouellette Avenue, one of the city's main thoroughfares. It is affectionately called 'The Castle' because of its prominent location and its distinctive turreted architecture.

Construction of the school started in 1928 and opened in 1929 with additions in 1966, 1967 and 1998. In 2020, at a cost of $5 million, major renovations were completed, including the rebuilding of the front facade.

The building itself has a gym, a library, a large cafeteria, a wood shop and a weight room which was once the pool. The site also includes Windsor Stadium which has a track and football field at the rear of the property. There are also tennis courts and a practice football field.

Kennedy Collegiate is named after the Honourable William Costello Kennedy, a Windsor politician who had served as Minister of Roads and Canals.

== Athletics ==
Kennedy Collegiate is renowned throughout Ontario for its outstanding swim program. The Kennedy swim team has experienced twenty three consecutive WECSSAA championships from 1978 to 2001 and ten overall provincial OFSAA championships from 1991 to 2001. The Kennedy swim team holds the record for the greatest number of OFSAA team championships banners (30) won of all high school swim programs. The Kennedy swim program has also developed national record holders such as Mike McWha, a representative of Team Canada at the 2000 Sydney Olympics. The Kennedy swim team's success is the product of the program set in place by Coach Dave Pells, now retired, who was involved with Kennedy for 37 years. The team was then overseen by Head Coach and former swimmer Michel Eastman, and assistant coaches Adam Mailloux, David Law, and Lindsay Tome. However, with the pool closed and there is no longer a team.

Kennedy has also had a very successful Cross Country team. In 2006, the team tied for the WECSSAA AAAA/AAA team championship even though Kennedy is considered an AA/A school. Kennedy's senior girls' A-team won the gold medal for both WECSSAA and SWOSSAA. All of this was possible thanks to Coach Hnidei.

Kennedy also has had a very successful Senior Boys Soccer team. In 2005, the team won the University of Windsor Tournament by beating L'Essor in the final by a score of 5–0. The Senior Boys Soccer team also won the OFSAA championship in 2010. They were the hosts of the tournament and won it in their home field. In addition, they won the WECSSAA AAAA/AAA championship by defeating Brennan in the final, 7–1, even though Kennedy is considered an AA/A school. They succeeded in beating St. Patrick's of Sarnia in the SWOSSAA AAA final by a score of 4–3, which allowed them to compete in London for the AAA OFSAA championships. The following year (2006), they won the Essex Raiders Indoor tournament and made it to the WECSSSA final where they placed second. In the 2007 season, the team won the WECSSAA A/AA championship by going undefeated through the regular season and the play-offs.

In the 2011–2012 school year KCI's junior and senior football teams won the WECSSAA championships.

== Activities ==
Kennedy is well known for many of its community activities like the Children's Christmas Party (CCP) for underprivileged grade school kids from the feeder schools. Kennedy students have annual Multicultural nights to promote diversity within the Windsor community. Clippers also participate in the annual Terry Fox run/walk for cancer research, in smaller events including food drives and toy drives.

== KennedyCACHE ==
In 2015, Mr. D. Platt and Mr. D. Alfano recruited students to create a FIRST Robotics Competition team. The Hon. W.C. Kennedy Collegiate was given Team 5408 and the name KennedyCACHE was chosen.

== Notable alumni ==
- Muftah Ageli, CFL player
- Darren Banks, NHL player with Boston Bruins
- Stubby Clapp, professional baseball player and coach
- Tony Golab, 1940 Grey Cup champion, Canadian Football Hall of Fame
- Herb Gray, former Deputy Prime Minister of Canada
- Tony Gray, artist/writer of "The Incredible Conduit" comic book and the internationally syndicated comic strip, "Saturday Afternoon".
- Mike Hurst, Former Mayor of Windsor Ontario
- Harold Jackson, NHL player with Chicago Black Hawks and Detroit Red Wings
- Joe Krol, winner of 6 Grey Cup championships, Canadian Football Hall of Fame
- John Loaring, Olympic silver medalist (1936)
- Sandra Pupatello, Former MPP and cabinet minister from Windsor-West, candidate for the leadership of the Ontario Liberal Party.
- Ernestine Russell, Olympic gymnast
- Gino Sovran, professional basketball player
- Harvey Thomas Strosberg, lawyer
- Maria Vacratsis, actress

== See also ==
- Education in Ontario
- List of secondary schools in Ontario
