= James Johnson (Canadian football) =

American gridiron football player (born 1980)

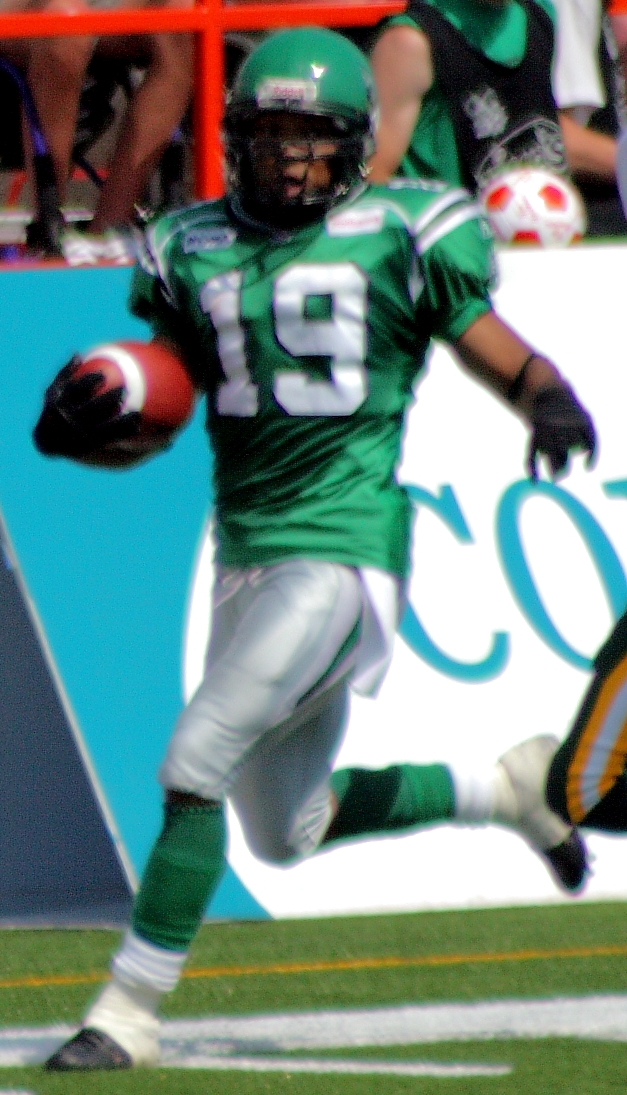
- Johnson returning an interception for the Saskatchewan Roughriders in 2007

No. 19
- Position: Defensive back

Personal information
- Born: May 5, 1980 (age 46); Los Angeles, California, U.S.
- Listed height: 5 ft 7 in (1.70 m)
- Listed weight: 185 lb (84 kg)

Career information
- College: Arkansas State

Career history
- 2006–2008: Saskatchewan Roughriders
- 2009: Winnipeg Blue Bombers

Awards and highlights
- Grey Cup champion (2007); Grey Cup MVP (2007); CFL West All-Star (2007)

James Johnson (born May 5, 1980) is an American former professional football player.

Johnson did not play high school football. He started playing for West Los Angeles Junior College, but was not given any equipment until he made the team as a defensive back, after being switched from running back. Arkansas State University then gave him a scholarship.

Johnson was signed as a free agent by the Saskatchewan Roughriders in 2006, and dressed for a total of 15 games, starting seven at cornerback. His college coach had sent a videotape to former Riders general manager Roy Shivers. "My college coach gave Mr. Shivers a call," said Johnson. "Mr. Shivers didn't really get a chance to see any tape on me, so he decided he was just going to bring me to camp. If I didn't perform he was going to send me home right away. I probably had the best training camp since my first year playing."

Johnson was named the Most Valuable Player of the 95th Grey Cup on Nov 25, 2007 after intercepting a record three passes, including one for a 30-yard touchdown. His defensive efforts helped lead the Roughriders to a 23–19 victory over their CFL Prairie rival Winnipeg Blue Bombers. It was the first time since 1994 that a defensive player was awarded the Grey Cup's top individual title. Johnson received a $10,000 bonus in cash for his efforts.

"I could never imagine this. That's the first time I've ever had three interceptions in a game."

It was only the Roughriders' third national football championship in 15 Grey Cup appearances.

On February 16, 2009, Johnson was traded to the Winnipeg Blue Bombers in exchange for a draft pick in the 2011 Canadian College Draft.

Johnson became a free agent on February 15, 2010.
