= Marcus Rucker =

American gridiron football player (born 1985)

No. 38
- Position: Linebacker

Personal information
- Born: April 20, 1985 (age 41); El Dorado, Arkansas
- Listed height: 6 ft 0 in (1.83 m)
- Listed weight: 200 lb (91 kg)

Career information
- College: Rice
- NFL draft: 2007: undrafted

Career history
- Seattle Seahawks (2007); Saskatchewan Roughriders (2007–2008)

Marcus Rucker (born April 20, 1985) played college football for the Rice Owls while majoring in Economics/Sports Management. He is the son of Isaiah Sr. and Rosalind and has two brothers and two sisters.

He attended training camp with the Seattle Seahawks, but was cut on August 28, 2007. On September 18, 2007, he signed a contract and was placed on the Developmental Squad with the CFL's Saskatchewan Roughriders. He was released by the Riders on June 21, 2008, following training camp. He was readded to the Riders' Developmental Squad on July 8, 2008.

In 2011, Marcus joined Teach for America 2011 Houston Corps to teach high school in inner-city Houston.
