= Carl Berman =

American football player (born 1985)

No. 84
- Position: Wide receiver

Personal information
- Born: April 5, 1985 (age 41); St. Petersburg, Florida, U.S.
- Listed height: 5 ft 10 in (1.78 m)
- Listed weight: 170 lb (77 kg)

Career information
- College: Indiana State

Career history
- 2007: Washington Redskins*
- 2007–2008: Saskatchewan Roughriders
- 2010: Toronto Argonauts
- 2010: Edmonton Eskimos*
- * Offseason or practice squad member only
- Stats at CFL.ca (archive)

Carl Berman (born April 5, 1985) is an American former professional football wide receiver. He played collegiately at the Indiana State University. While at Indiana State, Berman caught a total of 136 catches for 1,666 yards and had 11 touchdowns. He also returned kickoffs at Indiana State.

On September 11, 2007, the Saskatchewan Roughriders of the Canadian Football League added him to their Developmental Squad. He was released by the Riders on September 25, 2007. He was later resigned and on October 17, 2007, was placed on the Game Nine Injured List by the Riders. He spent the remainder of the Riders Grey Cup-championship season on the practice squad. He appeared in four games during the Riders' 2008 playoff season; he had 22 returns for 222 yards, 1 rush (14 yds) and 1 reception (13 yds). He was released by Saskatchewan on June 11, 2009.

He had previously attended training camp with the Washington Redskins and was released by the Redskins on September 1, 2007.

On June 3, 2010, Berman was signed by the Toronto Argonauts. He was released by the Argonauts on August 31, 2010. One week later, he was signed by the Edmonton Eskimos
