= Jean-Paul Circelli =

Canadian gridiron football coach

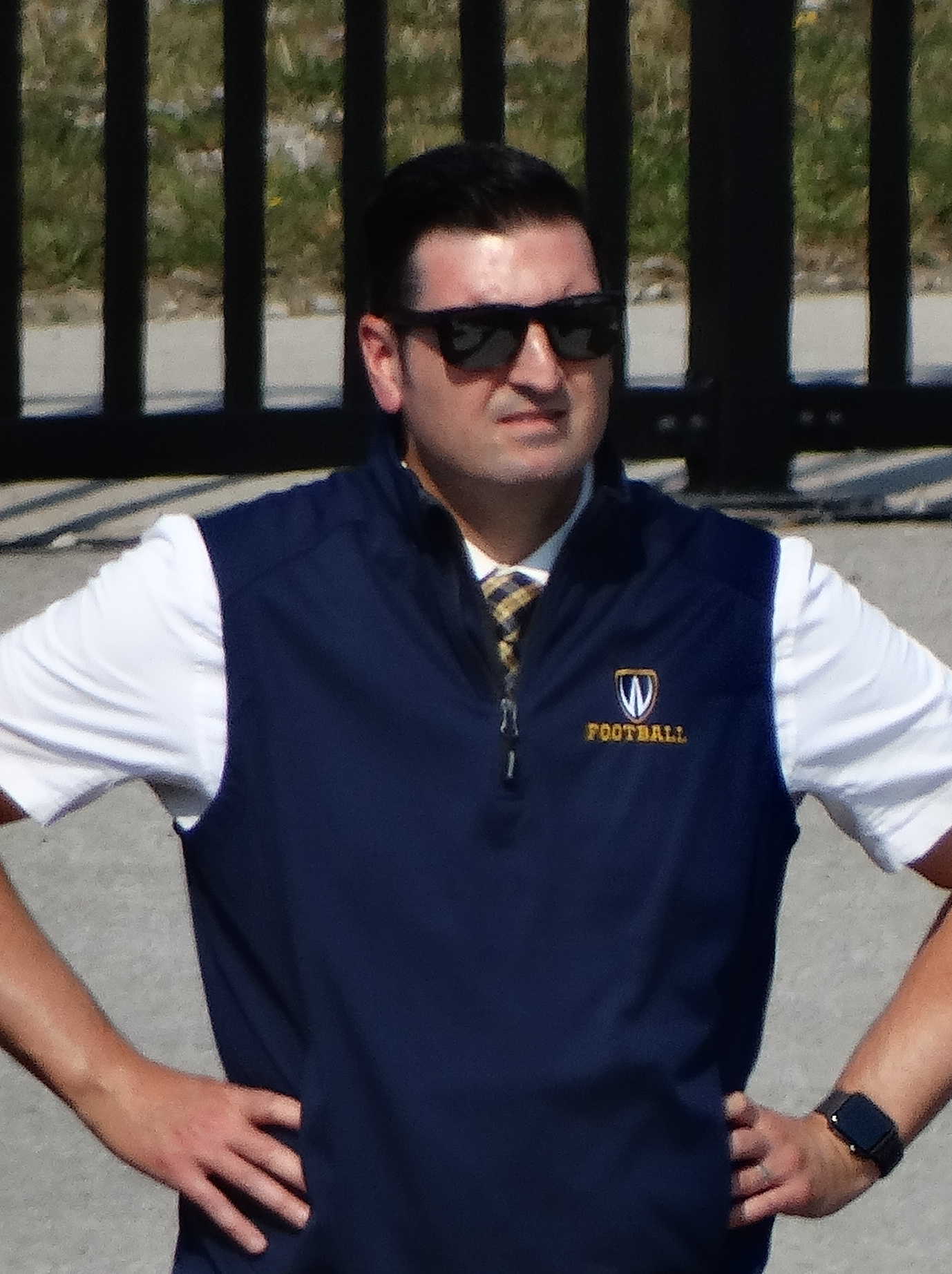
- Circelli with the Windsor Lancers in 2024

Windsor Lancers
- Title: Head coach

Personal information
- Born: London, Ontario

Career information
- Position: Centre
- University: McMaster

Career history
- 2013: London Junior Mustangs (Head coach)
- 2014: Concordia Stingers (Offensive line coach)
- 2015–2018: Western Mustangs (Offensive line coach)
- 2019–present: Windsor Lancers (Head coach)

Awards and highlights
- Vanier Cup champion (2017)

Jean-Paul Circelli is the head coach for the University of Windsor's football team, the Windsor Lancers. He won a Vanier Cup in 2017 with the Western Mustangs as the team's offensive line coach.

== University career ==
Circelli played at centre for the McMaster Marauders from 2001 to 2005. He was a member of three Yates Cup championship teams from 2001 to 2003.

== Coaching career ==
=== Early career ===
Following his university career, Circelli was hired by Catholic Central High School in 2006 to serve as an assistant coach. He then succeeded his father, Mike Circelli, as head coach for the team in 2010. In 2013, he served as the head coach for the London Junior Mustangs of the Ontario Varsity Football League, where the team won a championship.

=== Concordia Stingers ===
On July 10, 2014, it was announced that Circelli had joined the Concordia Stingers as the team's offensive line coach. The team finished with a 5–3 record in 2014 which was the program's first winning season since 2008.

=== Western Mustangs ===
Circelli was named the offensive line coach for the Western Mustangs on March 4, 2015. After a third-place finish in the OUA in 2014, the Mustangs finished first for each of the four years Circelli spent with the team. The Mustangs lost the Yates Cup in 2015 and 2016, but not only won in 2017, they also defeated the Laval Rouge et Or in the 53rd Vanier Cup game, which was Circelli's first national championship. Circelli returned to the Vanier Cup game in 2018, but the Mustangs lost in the rematch against the Rouge et Or in 54th Vanier Cup.

=== Windsor Lancers ===
On January 22, 2019, Circelli was named the head coach of the Windsor Lancers, the fifth in program history. In his first season, the Lancers finished with a third consecutive 1–7 record. After a cancelled 2020 season, the Lancers posted a 2–4 record in a shortened 2021 season.

In 2022, Circelli led the Lancers to a playoff berth for the first time since 2014 as they finished sixth with a 4–4 record. The team lost to the third place Ottawa Gee-Gees by a score of 43–40 in the quarterfinal.

In 2023, the Lancers began the season with five straight wins for the first time since the 1975 Yates Cup championship Lancers team. Circelli led the team to a 6–2 finish and hosted a playoff game for the first time since 2014. The Lancers defeated the Carleton Ravens in the quarterfinal, recording their first playoff victory since 2011 and their first home playoff victory since 1975. However, the team lost the semi-final to the Wilfrid Laurier Golden Hawks by a score of 21–14.

== Head coaching record ==
Year	Overall	Conference	Standing	Bowl/playoffs
Windsor Lancers (OUA) (2019–present)
2019	1–7	1–7	10th	
2020	Season canceled due to COVID-19 pandemic			
2021	2–4	2–4	6th (OUA West)	
2022	4–5	4–4	6th	
2023	7–3	6–2	3rd	
2024	5–4	5–3	4th	
2025	6-4	5-3	3rd	
Windsor:	25-25	23-23		
Total:	25-25			
