= Nikola Kalinic (gridiron football) =

Canadian gridiron football player (born 1997)

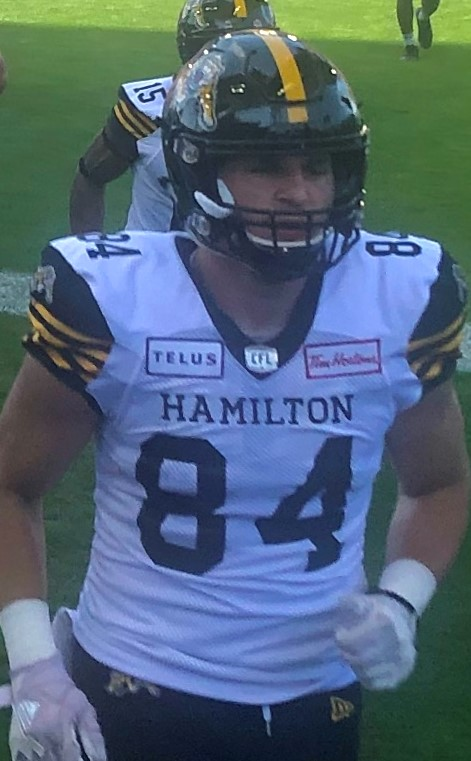
- Kalinic with the Hamilton Tiger-Cats in 2019

No. 86 – Chicago Bears
- Position: Tight end
- Roster status: Injured reserve

Personal information
- Born: January 21, 1997 (age 29); Toronto, Ontario, Canada
- Listed height: 6 ft 4 in (1.93 m)
- Listed weight: 248 lb (112 kg)

Career information
- High school: Silverthorn (Toronto)
- University: York (2015–2018)
- NFL draft: 2019: undrafted
- CFL draft: 2019: 2nd round, 10th overall pick

Career history
- Hamilton Tiger-Cats (2019–2021); Indianapolis Colts (2022); Los Angeles Rams (2023–2024); Atlanta Falcons (2025)*; Chicago Bears (2025–present)
- * Offseason or practice squad member only

Career NFL statistics as of 2025
- Games played: 11
- Games started: 2
- Stats at Pro Football Reference

Career CFL statistics
- Receptions: 23
- Receiving yards: 192
- Receiving touchdowns: 2
- Stats at CFL.ca

Nikola Kalinic (Serbian Cyrillic: Никола Калинић, romanized: Nikola Kalinić; born January 21, 1997) is a Canadian professional football tight end for the Chicago Bears of the National Football League (NFL). He has previously played in the NFL for the Indianapolis Colts and Los Angeles Rams, and in the Canadian Football League (CFL) for the Hamilton Tiger-Cats.

== University career ==
Kalinic played U Sports football for the York Lions from 2015 to 2018. In his four years with the team, he had 38 catches for 416 yards and two touchdowns and was the first York football player to be named an OUA All-Star twice in one season (on offence and on special teams).

== Professional career ==
Pre-draft measurables
Height	Weight	40-yard dash	20-yard shuttle	Three-cone drill	Vertical jump	Broad jump	Bench press
6 ft 3 3/4 in (1.92 m)	245 lb (111 kg)	4.99 s	4.44 s	7.44 s	30.5 in (0.77 m)	9 ft 4 3/8 in (2.85 m)	10 reps
All values from CFL Combine

=== Hamilton Tiger-Cats ===
Kalinic was selected in the second round, tenth overall, by the Hamilton Tiger-Cats in the 2019 CFL draft and he signed with the team on May 17, 2019. After making the team following training camp, he played in his first professional game on June 13, 2019 against the Saskatchewan Roughriders. In his second game, on June 22, 2019, against the Toronto Argonauts, he scored his first career CFL touchdown on his first career reception on a 31-yard pass from Jeremiah Masoli. Overall, Kalinic played in 16 regular season games for the Tiger-Cats in 2019 where he recorded 12 receptions for 106 yards and one touchdown. He played in his first career post-season game, against the Edmonton Eskimos, in the East Final win that sent the Tiger-Cats to the 107th Grey Cup. Kalinic played in his first Grey Cup game, but the Tiger-Cats lost to the Winnipeg Blue Bombers.

Due to the cancellation of the 2020 CFL season, Kalinic did not play in 2020. In 2021, he played in all 14 regular season games as he had 11 catches for 86 yards and one touchdown with eight special teams tackles. He also played in all three post-season games that year, including his second consecutive Grey Cup game where the Tiger-Cats again lost to the Blue Bombers in the 108th Grey Cup. He was scheduled to become a free agent in 2022, but was granted an early release on January 22, 2022, so that he could sign with a team in the National Football League.

=== Indianapolis Colts ===
Kalinic signed with the Indianapolis Colts of the National Football League (NFL). He was waived on August 30, 2022, and signed to the practice squad the next day. He was promoted to the active roster on December 13. He was waived on May 4, 2023.

=== Los Angeles Rams ===
On July 14, 2023, Kalinic signed with the Los Angeles Rams. He was waived on August 29, 2023 and re-signed to the practice squad.

On January 16, 2024, Kalinic signed a reserve/future contract with the Rams. He was waived on August 27, and re-signed to the practice squad.

=== Atlanta Falcons ===
On January 28, 2025, Kalinic signed a reserve/future contract with the Atlanta Falcons. He was waived on August 23.

=== Chicago Bears ===
On August 28, 2025, Kalinic was signed to the Chicago Bears' practice squad. On January 20, 2026, he signed a reserve/futures contract with Chicago.

== Personal life ==
Kalinic is of Serbian descent.
