= Warren Craney =

Canadian football coach

Personal information
- Born: February 29, 1968 (age 58); Kirkland, Quebec

Career history
- 1997–1999: Vanier Cheetahs (DC)
- 2000–2002: Concordia Stingers (DLC)
- 2003–2009: Concordia Stingers (DC)
- 2010–2022: York Lions (HC)

Awards and highlights
- 2x IFAF U-19 World Cup champion (2012, 2016)

Warren Craney is the former head coach for York University's football team, the York Lions, a position he held from the 2010 to 2022. He has also been a coach for the Canada national football junior team, winning a gold medal as the team's defensive coordinator in 2012 and winning the championship as the team's head coach in 2016. Prior to his time with York, he was the defensive coordinator for the Concordia Stingers.

== Personal life ==
Craney and his wife, Cara, have five children.
