= 2007 CFL draft =

Canadian football draft

General information
- Sport: Football
- Date: May 2

Overview
- 47 total selections
- First selection: Chris Bauman
- Most selections: Hamilton Tiger-Cats (9)
- Fewest selections: Winnipeg Blue Bombers (3)

The 2007 CFL draft took place on Wednesday, May 2, 2007. 47 players were chosen from among 911 eligible players from Canadian Universities across the country, as well as Canadian players playing in the NCAA. Of the 47 draft selections, 31 players were drafted from Canadian Interuniversity Sport institutions.

== Forfeitures ==
- Edmonton forfeited their sixth round selection after selecting Jermaine Lee in the 2006 Supplemental Draft.

== Draft order ==
= CFL Division All-Star	= CFL All-Star	= Hall of Famer

=== Round one ===
Pick #	CFL team	Player	Position	School
1	Hamilton Tiger-Cats	Chris Bauman	WR	Regina
2	Edmonton Eskimos	Warren Kean	K	Concordia
3	Calgary Stampeders (via Winnipeg)	Mike Gyetvai	OL	Michigan State
4	Hamilton Tiger-Cats (via Saskatchewan)	J.P. Bekasiak	DL	Toledo
5	Calgary Stampeders (via Toronto)	Justin Phillips	LB	Wilfrid Laurier
6	Calgary Stampeders	Jabari Arthur	WR	Akron
7	Montreal Alouettes	Richard Yalowsky	OL	Calgary
8	BC Lions	Adam Nicolson	WR	Ottawa

=== Round two ===
Pick #	CFL team	Player	Position	School
9	Saskatchewan Roughriders (via Hamilton)	David McKoy	WR	Guelph
10	Edmonton Eskimos	Jason Nedd	DB	Akron
11	Winnipeg Blue Bombers	Corey Mace	DT	Wyoming
12	Hamilton Tiger-Cats (via Saskatchewan)	Jordan Rempel	OL	Saskatchewan
13	Hamilton Tiger-Cats (via Edmonton via Toronto)	Eric Ince	OL	St. Mary's
14	Calgary Stampeders	Kevin Challenger	WR	Boston College
15	Montreal Alouettes	Darryl Conrad	T	Manitoba
16	BC Lions	Josh Bean	LB	Boise State

=== Round three ===
Pick #	CFL team	Player	Position	School
17	BC Lions (via Hamilton)	Tad Crawford	S	Columbia
18	Montreal Alouettes (via Edmonton)	Chris Van Zeyl	DL	McMaster
19	Montreal Alouettes (via Hamilton via Winnipeg)	Brian Jones	OL	Windsor
20	Saskatchewan Roughriders	Yannick Carter	LB	Wilfrid Laurier
21	Calgary Stampeders (via Toronto)	Patrick MacDonald	DL	Alberta
22	Winnipeg Blue Bombers (via Calgary)	Eugene Boakye	LB	McMaster
23	Montreal Alouettes	Donovan Alexander	DB	North Dakota
24	BC Lions	Andre Sadeghian	RB	McMaster

=== Round four ===
Pick #	CFL team	Player	Position	School
25	Hamilton Tiger-Cats (via Montreal via Hamilton)	Robert Pavlovic	TE	South Carolina
26	Edmonton Eskimos	Micheal Jean-louis	DL	Laval
27	Edmonton Eskimos (via Winnipeg)	Calvin McCarty	RB	Western Washington
28	Saskatchewan Roughriders	Ryan Ackerman	OL	Regina
29	Toronto Argonauts	Eric Maranda	LB	Laval
30	Toronto Argonauts (via Calgary)	Steve Schmidt	TE	San Diego State
31	Montreal Alouettes	James Judges	DE	Buffalo
32	BC Lions	Andrew Jones	DL	McMaster

=== Round five ===
Pick #	CFL team	Player	Position	School
33	Hamilton Tiger-Cats	Chris Getzlaf	SB	Regina
34	Saskatchewan Roughriders (via Winnipeg via Edmonton)	Reggie Bradshaw	RB	Montana
35	Calgary Stampeders (via Winnipeg)	Henry Bekkering	K	Eastern Washington
36	Hamilton Tiger-Cats (via Saskatchewan)	Nick Kordic	DB	Western Ontario
37	Toronto Argonauts	Sean Simms	DL	York
38	Calgary Stampeders	Ian Hazlett	LB	Queen's
39	Saskatchewan Roughriders (via Montreal)	Ryan Karhut	OL	Manitoba
40	BC Lions	Kyle Kirkwood	OL	Ottawa

=== Round six ===
Pick #	CFL team	Player	Position	School
41	Hamilton Tiger-Cats	Micheal Goncalves	DL	Toronto
–	Edmonton Eskimos	Forfeit pick		
42	Winnipeg Blue Bombers	Travis Noel	DB	St. Francis Xavier
43	Hamilton Tiger-Cats (via Saskatchewan)	Adam Kania	DE	St. Francis Xavier
44	Toronto Argonauts	Brad Smith	WR	Queen's
45	Calgary Stampeders	Greg Hetherington	SB	McGill
46	Montreal Alouettes	Braden Smith	QB	UBC
47	BC Lions	Nic Edgson	DB	Idaho State
