= Ryan Karhut =

Canadian football player (born 1981)

Profile
- Position: Guard

Personal information
- Born: September 9, 1981 (age 45); Regina, Saskatchewan, Canada
- Listed height: 6 ft 3 in (1.91 m)
- Listed weight: 300 lb (136 kg)

Career information
- University: University of Manitoba
- CFL draft: 2007: 5th round, 39th overall pick

Career history
- 2007: Saskatchewan Roughriders*
- 2007–2009: Montreal Alouettes
- * Offseason or practice squad member only
- Stats at CFL.ca

Ryan Karhut (born September 9, 1981) is a Canadian former professional football guard. He was drafted by the Saskatchewan Roughriders in the fifth round of the 2007 CFL draft and then the Riders traded a 1st and 4th round 2008 Canadian College Draft pick, along with OL Ryan Karhut, to the Alouettes to get Childs, along with OL Brain Jones. He played CIS football for the Manitoba Bisons 2005 to 2007. Karhut captained the Vanier Cup-winning Bisons in 2007. Prior to that, he played at the University of Central Florida following a five-year stint with the Edmonton Huskies of the CJFL.

Karhut is currently the special teams coordinator and defensive line coach for York University. Prior to that, he was the head coach of the Winnipeg Rifles.
