= Reggie Bradshaw =

Canadian football player (born 1984)

Profile
- Position: Running back

Personal information
- Born: March 4, 1984 (age 42); New Westminster, British Columbia, Canada
- Listed height: 6 ft 0 in (1.83 m)
- Listed weight: 216 lb (98 kg)

Career information
- College: Montana
- CFL draft: 2007: 5th round, 34th overall pick

Career history
- 2007–2008: Saskatchewan Roughriders*
- 2009: Calgary Stampeders*
- * Offseason or practice squad member only
- Stats at CFL.ca (archive)

Reggie Bradshaw (born March 4, 1984) is a Canadian former football running back. He was drafted by the Saskatchewan Roughriders in the fifth round of the 2007 CFL draft. He played college football for the Montana Grizzlies.

Bradshaw was also a member of the Calgary Stampeders.
