= Josh Bean (Canadian football) =

Canadian football player (born 1982)

Profile
- Position: Linebacker

Personal information
- Born: November 10, 1982 (age 43); Calgary, Alberta, Canada
- Listed height: 6 ft 0 in (1.83 m)
- Listed weight: 220 lb (100 kg)

Career information
- College: Boise State
- CFL draft: 2007: 2nd round, 16th overall pick

Career history
- 2009: BC Lions*
- 2009: Edmonton Eskimos*
- * Offseason or practice squad member only
- Stats at CFL.ca (archive)

Josh Bean (born November 10, 1982) is a Canadian former football linebacker. He was selected by the BC Lions of the Canadian Football League (CFL) in the second round of the 2007 CFL draft. He played college football for the Boise State Broncos.
