= 2010 Saskatchewan Roughriders season =

CFL team season

- General manager: Brendan Taman
- Head coach: Ken Miller
- Home stadium: Mosaic Stadium at Taylor Field

Results
- Record: 10–8
- Division place: 2nd, West
- Playoffs: Lost Grey Cup
- Team MOP: Darian Durant
- Team MOC: Andy Fantuz
- Team MOR: Shomari Williams

Uniform

The 2010 Saskatchewan Roughriders season was the 53rd season for the team in the Canadian Football League (CFL). The Roughriders attempted to win their fourth Grey Cup championship, but they lost to the Montreal Alouettes. The Roughriders celebrated their 100th Anniversary this year, which included wearing retro black, silver and red uniforms, having a documentary made of the franchise and having the Canadian Mint release a specialized Roughrider loonie.

== Offseason ==
=== Transactions ===
Date	Type	Incoming	Outgoing	Team
December 7, 2009	Re-Signing	Chris Best	N/A	Saskatchewan Roughriders
December 7, 2009	Re-Signing	Luc Mullinder	N/A	Saskatchewan Roughriders
January 11, 2010	Deferred List	N/A	John Chick	Indianapolis Colts
January 15, 2010	Re-Signing	Hugh Charles	N/A	Saskatchewan Roughriders
January 15, 2010	Re-Signing	Chris Getzlaf	N/A	Saskatchewan Roughriders
January 28, 2010	Re-Signing	Omarr Morgan	N/A	Saskatchewan Roughriders
February 9, 2010	Deferred List	N/A	Stevie Baggs	Arizona Cardinals
February 10, 2010	Signing	Kelly Bates	N/A	Winnipeg Blue Bombers
February 10, 2010	Release	N/A	Antonio Hall	Saskatchewan Roughriders
February 10, 2010	Release	N/A	Bobby Harris	Saskatchewan Roughriders
February 10, 2010	Release	N/A	Denatay Heard	Saskatchewan Roughriders
February 12, 2010	Re-Signing	Andy Fantuz	N/A	Saskatchewan Roughriders
February 15, 2010	Re-Signing	Stu Foord	N/A	Saskatchewan Roughriders
February 15, 2010	Deferred List	N/A	Renauld Williams	Pittsburgh Steelers
February 16, 2010	Re-Signing	Jocelyn Frenette	N/A	Saskatchewan Roughriders
February 16, 2010	Re-Signing	Marc Parenteau	N/A	Saskatchewan Roughriders
February 16, 2010	Re-Signing	Chris Szarka	N/A	Saskatchewan Roughriders
February 17, 2010	Re-Signing	Tad Kornegay	N/A	Saskatchewan Roughriders
February 17, 2010	Signing	Dominique Dorsey	N/A	Toronto Argonauts
February 23, 2010	Free agent Lost	N/A	Steven Jyles	Winnipeg Blue Bombers
February 23, 2010	Re-Signing	James Patrick	N/A	Saskatchewan Roughriders
February 24, 2010	Trade	Prechae Rodriguez	Adam Nicolson	Hamilton Tiger-Cats
February 24, 2010	Re-Signing	Marcus Adams	N/A	Saskatchewan Roughriders
February 26, 2010	Free agent Lost	N/A	Gerran Walker	Toronto Argonauts
February 26, 2010	Retirement	N/A	Eddie Davis	Saskatchewan Roughriders
March 3, 2010	Signing	Dan Goodspeed	N/A	Saskatchewan Roughriders
March 9, 2010	Trade	2010 5th round draft pick	Dalton Bell	Toronto Argonauts
March 10, 2010	Re-Signing	Wes Cates	N/A	Saskatchewan Roughriders
March 10, 2010	Re-Signing	Darian Durant	N/A	Saskatchewan Roughriders
March 19, 2010	Signing	Aaron Fairooz	N/A	Saskatchewan Roughriders
March 19, 2010	Signing	Cary Koch	N/A	Saskatchewan Roughriders
March 24, 2010	Signing	Brandon Register	N/A	Saskatchewan Roughriders
March 24, 2010	Signing	LaDarius Key	N/A	Saskatchewan Roughriders
March 24, 2010	Signing	Brandon Foster	N/A	Saskatchewan Roughriders
March 26, 2010	Signing	Barrin Simpson	N/A	Saskatchewan Roughriders
April 1, 2010	Signing	Lavarus Giles	N/A	Saskatchewan Roughriders
April 1, 2010	Signing	Marcus Thigpen	N/A	Saskatchewan Roughriders
April 9, 2010	Re-Signing	Cole Bergquist	N/A	Saskatchewan Roughriders
April 9, 2010	Signing	Kent Smith	N/A	Saskatchewan Roughriders
April 14, 2010	Re-Signing	Rob Bagg	N/A	Saskatchewan Roughriders
April 15, 2010	Release	N/A	Jason Armstead	Saskatchewan Roughriders
April 16, 2010	Signing	Jim Maxwell	N/A	Saskatchewan Roughriders
April 16, 2010	Signing	Vaalyn Jackson	N/A	Saskatchewan Roughriders
April 22, 2010	Release	N/A	Graham Harrell	Saskatchewan Roughriders
April 22, 2010	Release	N/A	Eric Morris	Saskatchewan Roughriders
April 27, 2010	Signing	Jeremy Gilchrist	N/A	Saskatchewan Roughriders
April 27, 2010	Signing	Brent Hawkins	N/A	Saskatchewan Roughriders
May 2, 2010	Trade	2010 1st overall draft pick 2010 2nd round draft pick	2010 1st round draft pick 2010 1st round draft pick Jamie Boreham	Toronto Argonauts
May 12, 2010	Signing	Taylor Wallace	N/A	Saskatchewan Roughriders
May 12, 2010	Signing	Shomari Williams	N/A	Saskatchewan Roughriders
May 18, 2010	Retired	N/A	Aaron Wagner	Saskatchewan Roughriders
May 18, 2010	Release	N/A	Carlos Armour	Saskatchewan Roughriders
May 28, 2010	Release	N/A	Jim Maxwell	Saskatchewan Roughriders
May 18, 2010	Signing	Ikenna Ike	N/A	Saskatchewan Roughriders
May 21, 2010	Signing	Dwayne Eley	N/A	Saskatchewan Roughriders
May 21, 2010	Signing	Aaron Love	N/A	Saskatchewan Roughriders
May 21, 2010	Signing	Aaron Waldie	N/A	Saskatchewan Roughriders
May 26, 2010	Signing	Ryan Dinwiddie	N/A	Saskatchewan Roughriders
May 26, 2010	Signing	Todd Reesing	N/A	Saskatchewan Roughriders
May 27, 2010	Release	N/A	Johnny Quinn	Saskatchewan Roughriders
May 27, 2010	Release	N/A	Kevin Scott	Saskatchewan Roughriders
June 1, 2010	Signing	Willie Byrd	N/A	Saskatchewan Roughriders
June 1, 2010	Signing	Christian Houle	N/A	Saskatchewan Roughriders
June 1, 2010	Signing	Ryan Lucas	N/A	Saskatchewan Roughriders
June 5, 2010	Release	N/A	Vaalyn Jackson	Saskatchewan Roughriders
June 5, 2010	Release	N/A	Ryan Lucas	Saskatchewan Roughriders
June 5, 2010	Release	N/A	Aaron Love	Saskatchewan Roughriders
June 5, 2010	Release	N/A	David McKoy	Saskatchewan Roughriders
June 6, 2010	Trade	Obed Cetoute	Jonathan St. Pierre	Toronto Argonauts
June 8, 2010	Release	N/A	Todd Reesing	Saskatchewan Roughriders

=== CFL draft ===
Round	Pick	Player	Position	School/Club team
1	1	Shomari Williams	LB	Queen's
2	8	Jordan Sisco	WR	Regina
5	33	Patrick Neufeld	OL	Saskatchewan
5	38	Bruno LaPointe	DL	Buffalo

== Preseason ==
Week	Date	Opponent	Score	Result	Attendance
A	Sun, June 13	BC Lions	19–17	Loss	29,227
B	Sun, June 20	at Calgary Stampeders	41–17	Loss	29,050

# Games played with primary home uniforms.

== Regular season ==
=== Season standings ===
West Division
Team	GP	W	L	T	PF	PA	Pts	
Calgary Stampeders	18	13	5	0	626	459	26	Details
Saskatchewan Roughriders	18	10	8	0	497	488	20	Details
BC Lions	18	8	10	0	466	466	16	Details
Edmonton Eskimos	18	7	11	0	382	545	14	Details

=== Season schedule ===
Week	Date	Opponent	Score	Result	Attendance	Record
1	Thurs, July 1	Montreal Alouettes	54–51 (2OT)	Win	30,048	1–0
2	Sat, July 10	at BC Lions	37–18	Win	27,528	2–0
3	Sat, July 17	Edmonton Eskimos	24–20	Win	30,048	3–0
4	Sat, July 24	at Calgary Stampeders	40–20	Loss	35,650	3–1
5	Sat, July 31	Hamilton Tiger-Cats	37–24	Win	30,048	4–1
‖ 6 ‖	Fri, Aug 6	at Montreal Alouettes	30–26	Loss	25,012	4–2
‖ 7 ‖	Thurs, Aug 12	BC Lions	37–13	Win	30,048	5–2
8	Bye					5–2
9	Sat, Aug 28	at Edmonton Eskimos	17–14	Loss	47,829	5–3
‖ 10 ‖	Sun, Sept 5	Winnipeg Blue Bombers	27–23	Win	30,048	6–3
11	Sun, Sept 12	at Winnipeg Blue Bombers	31–2	Loss	29,533	6–4
12	Fri, Sept 17	Calgary Stampeders	43–37 (OT)	Win	30,048	7–4
13	Sat, Sept 25	at Hamilton Tiger-Cats	32–25	Win	23,108	8–4
14	Sat, Oct 2	at Toronto Argonauts	27–16	Win	23,873	9–4
15	Sat, Oct 9	Toronto Argonauts	24–19	Loss	30,048	9–5
16	Sun, Oct 17	Calgary Stampeders	34–26	Loss	30,048	9–6
17	Sat, Oct 23	at Edmonton Eskimos	39–24	Loss	38,325	9–7
18	Sun, Oct 31	at BC Lions	23–17	Loss	25,479	9–8
19	Sat, Nov 6	Edmonton Eskimos	31–23	Win	30,048	10–8

# Games played with primary home uniforms.
# Games played with white uniforms.
ǁ # ǁ Games played with retro alternate uniforms.
ǁ # ǁ Games played with white retro alternate uniforms.
# Games played with 100th anniversary uniforms.

== Roster ==
2010 Saskatchewan Roughriders final roster
Quarterbacks: 17 Cole Bergquist; 8 Ryan Dinwiddie; 4 Darian Durant; Running backs: 20 Wes Cates; 22 Stu Foord; 32 Neal Hughes; 33 Chris Szarka; Receivers: 82 Jason Clermont; 7 Weston Dressler; 83 Andy Fantuz; 89 Chris Getzlaf; 3 Ryan Grice-Mullen; 84 Cary Koch	Offensive linemen: 65 Joel Bell T; 66 Chris Best G; 64 Dan Goodspeed T; 60 Gene Makowsky T/G; 54 Jeremy O'Day C; 57 Marc Parenteau G; Defensive linemen: 51 Marcus Adams DT; 90 Brent Hawkins DE; 26 Kitwana Jones DE; 96 Ryan Lucas DT; 95 Luc Mullinder DE; 91 Montez Murphy DT/DE; 74 Keith Shologan DT; 99 Shomari Williams DE	Linebackers: 30 Byron Bullock; 50 Jerrell Freeman; 47 Cory Huclack; 24 Tad Kornegay; 31 Sean Lucas; 45 Mike McCullough; 2 Barrin Simpson; Defensive backs: 5 Donovan Alexander; 15 Lance Frazier; 27 Nick Graham; 39 Chris McKenzie; 25 Leron Mitchell; 1 Omarr Morgan; 14 James Patrick	Special teams: 59 Jocelyn Frenette LS; 42 Eddie Johnson P/K; 16 Warren Kean K; Reserve roster: 69 Nick Hutchins C/G; 46 Kye Stewart LB; Practice roster: 67 Dan Clark G; 58 Marion Dukes T; 92 Calvin Fance DE; 94 Ikenna Ike DT; 28 LaDarius Key DB; 9 Courtney Robinson DB	Injured list: 6 Rob Bagg WR; 18 Obed Cétoute SB; 38 Hugh Charles RB; 10 Luca Congi K; 27 Dominique Dorsey RB; 87 Aaron Fairooz WR; 35 Daniel Francis DB; 37 Tamon George DB; 41 Ludovic Kashindi DB; 12 Jordan Sisco WR; 52 Wayne Smith G; 98 Rodrique Wright DT; Suspended: Lavarus Giles RB; Italics indicate International player Roster updated 2026-05-09; Depth Chart • Transactions

== Player stats ==
=== Passing ===
Player	Att	Comp	%	Yards	TD	INT	Rating
Darian Durant	644	391	60.7	5542	25	22	87.2
Ryan Dinwiddie	120	60	50.0	503	7	5	100.4
Weston Dressler	2	0	0.0	0	0	0	2.1

=== Rushing ===
Player	No.	Yards	Average	Long	TD	Fumbles
Wes Cates	203	1054	5.2	83	15	3
Darian Durant	80	618	7.7	35	7	13
Hugh Charles	13	115	8.8	30	2	0
Weston Dressler	9	57	6.3	15	0	0
Rob Bagg	2	43	21.5	46	0	0
Chris Szarka	10	21	2.1	5	1	0

=== Receiving ===
Player	No.	Yards	Avg.	Long	TD
Andy Fantuz	87	1380	15.9	66	6
Weston Dressler	81	1189	14.7	77	6
Chris Getzlaf	55	946	17.2	85	5
Rob Bagg	44	688	15.6	87	3
Prechae Rodriguez	30	376	12.5	43	2
Wes Cates	42	355	8.5	33	1
Jason Clermont	27	300	11.1	35	0
Cary Koch	21	299	14.2	42	3

== Awards and records ==
=== 2010 CFL All-Stars ===
- SB – Andy Fantuz
- S – James Patrick

=== CFL Western All-Stars ===
- RB – Wes Cates, CFL Western All-Star
- SB – Andy Fantuz, CFL Western All-Star
- OT – Gene Makowsky, CFL Western All-Star
- OC – Jeremy O'Day, CFL Western All-Star
- LB – Barrin Simpson, CFL Western All-Star
- S – James Patrick, CFL Western All-Star

=== CFL Players of the Week ===
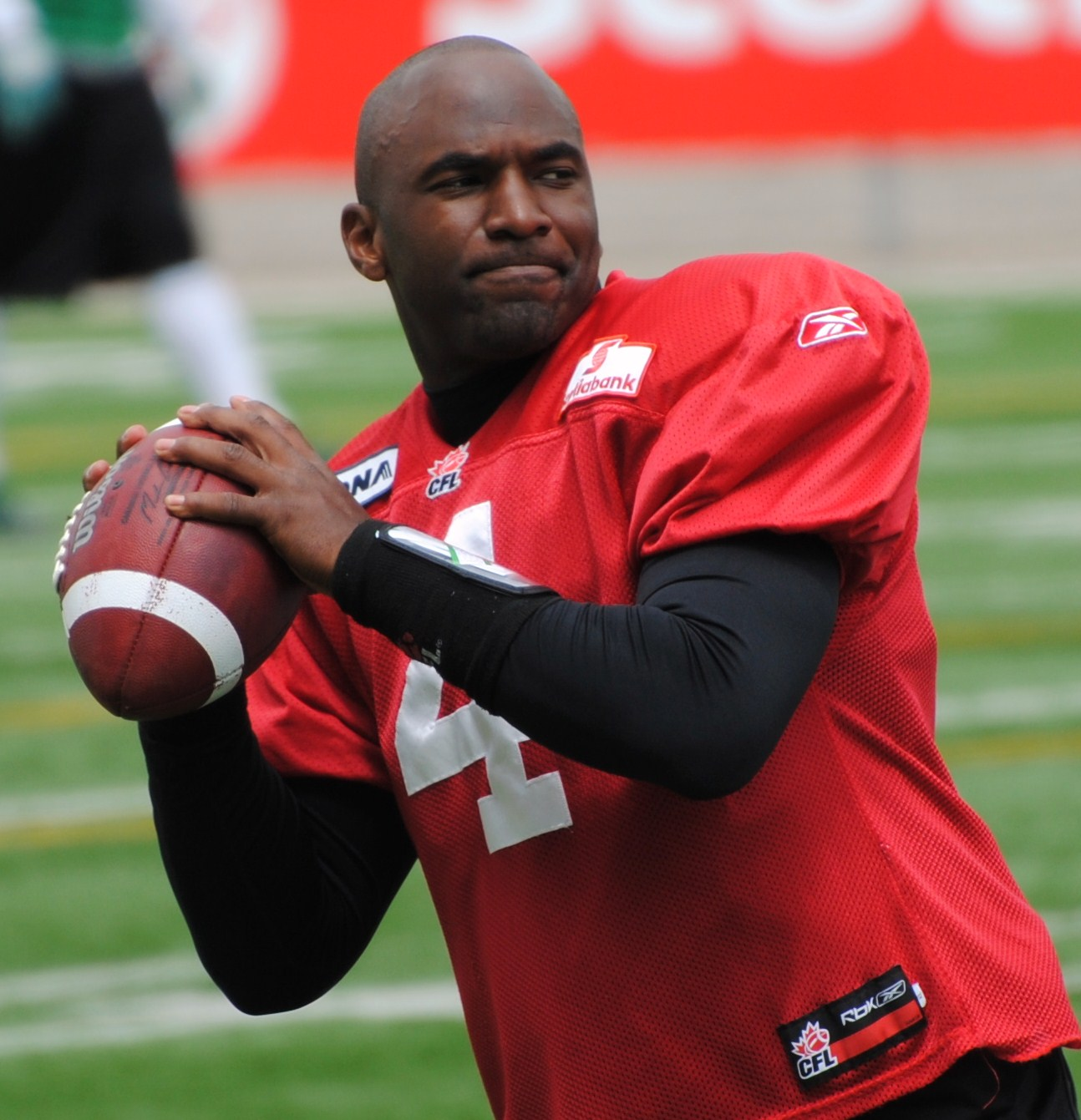
Quarterback Darian Durant was named the CFL's Offensive Player of the Week for the first week of the season.

Week	Player	Award
One	Darian Durant	Offensive Player of the Week
One	Andy Fantuz	Outstanding Canadian
Two	Brent Hawkins	Defensive Player of the Week
Five	Luca Congi	Special Teams Player of the Week
Five	Andy Fantuz	Outstanding Canadian
Seven	Jerrell Freeman	Defensive Player of the Week
Nine	James Patrick	Defensive Player of the Week
Twelve	Andy Fantuz	Offensive Player of the Week
Twelve	Andy Fantuz	Outstanding Canadian
Fourteen	Andy Fantuz	Outstanding Canadian
Sixteen	Chris Getzlaf	Outstanding Canadian
Twenty	Weston Dressler	Offensive Player of the Week
Twenty	Lance Frazier	Defensive Player of the Week
Twenty	Jason Clermont	Outstanding Canadian
Twenty-one	Jerrell Freeman	Defensive Player of the Week
Twenty-one	Chris Getzlaf	Outstanding Canadian

=== CFL Players of the Month ===
Month	Player	Award
July	Andy Fantuz	Outstanding Canadian
September	Darian Durant	Offensive Player
September	Andy Fantuz	Outstanding Canadian
October	Andy Fantuz	Outstanding Canadian

== Playoffs ==
=== Schedule ===
Week	Date	Time	Opponent	Score	Result	Attendance
ǁ 20 ǁ	Nov 14	3:30 PM CST	BC Lions	41–38 (2OT)	Win	29,215
ǁ 21 ǁ	Nov 21	3:30 PM CST	at Calgary Stampeders	20–16	Win	35,650
ǁ 22 ǁ	Nov 28	5:00 PM CST	vs. Montreal Alouettes at Commonwealth Stadium, Edmonton	21–18	Loss	63,317

ǁ # ǁ Games played with retro alternate uniforms.
ǁ # ǁ Games played with white retro alternate uniforms.

=== Bracket ===
November 14: Division Semi-Finals
E3	Toronto Argonauts	16
E2	Hamilton Tiger-Cats	13
W3	BC Lions	38
W2	Saskatchewan Roughriders	41*

November 21: Division Finals
E3	Toronto Argonauts	17
E1	Montreal Alouettes	48
W2	Saskatchewan Roughriders	20
W1	Calgary Stampeders	16

November 28: 98th Grey Cup; Commonwealth Stadium – Edmonton
E1	Montreal Alouettes	21
W2	Saskatchewan Roughriders	18

*-Team won in Overtime.

=== West Semi-Final ===
BC at Saskatchewan

Team	1	2	3	4	OT	2OT	Total
Lions	3	13	3	8	8	3	38
• Roughriders	4	3	7	13	8	6	41

- Date: November 14
- Location: Mosaic Stadium at Taylor Field
  Regina, SK
- Game start: 3:30 PM CST
- Game attendance: 29,215
- TV announcers (TSN): Chris Cuthbert (Play by Play), Glen Suitor (Colour), Farhan Lalji (Sideline)

=== West Final ===
Saskatchewan at Calgary

Team	1	2	3	4	Total
• Roughriders	0	14	6	0	20
Stampeders	11	0	4	1	16

- Date: November 21
- Location: McMahon Stadium
  Calgary, AB
- Game start: 3:30 PM CST
- Game attendance: 35,650
- Referee: Andre Proulx
- TV announcers (TSN): Chris Cuthbert (Play by play), Glen Suitor (Colour), Farhan Lalji (Sideline)

=== 98th Grey Cup Final ===
Montreal vs. Saskatchewan

Team	1	2	3	4	Total
• Alouettes	8	0	3	10	21
Roughriders	7	4	0	7	18

- Date: November 28
- Location: Commonwealth Stadium
  Edmonton, AB
- Game start: 5:00 PM CST
- Game attendance: 63,317
- Referee: Bud Steen
- TV announcers (TSN): Chris Cuthbert (Play by play), Glen Suitor (Colour)
