= 2008 Saskatchewan Roughriders season =

CFL team season

- General manager: Eric Tillman
- Head coach: Ken Miller
- Home stadium: Mosaic Stadium at Taylor Field

Results
- Record: 12–6
- Division place: 2nd, West
- Playoffs: Lost West Semi-Final
- Team MOP: Wes Cates
- Team MOC: Gene Makowsky
- Team MOR: Weston Dressler

Uniform

The 2008 Saskatchewan Roughriders finished in second place in the West Division with a 12–6 record for the second consecutive year. It was their 51st season in the Canadian Football League. The Roughriders attempted to repeat as Grey Cup champions, but, due to an abundance of injuries, lost to the BC Lions in the West Semi-Final game.

== Off-season ==
Several months after capturing the 2007 Grey Cup, 2007 CFL coach of the Year Kent Austin stepped down as head coach to become the offensive co-ordinator at Ole Miss. In accepting this position in the NCAA, Austin turned down a very lucrative contract that the Riders had offered. On February 6, 2008, Eric Tillman announced that the new head coach would be Ken Miller. Miller was formerly an offensive coordinator under Austin.

Last season's starting quarterback Kerry Joseph was traded to the Toronto Argonauts on March 5, 2008, along with a third round pick in the 2010 CFL draft in exchange for offensive tackle Glenn January, defensive lineman Ronald Flemons, the Argos' first-round pick in the 2008 CFL draft and a 2010 second-round selection.

On April 5, 2008 a report was released saying that the Roughriders set a new record for earnings in a single season. At the Roughriders' annual general meeting, Mike Back, the club's vice-president of finance and operations, reported the Roughriders registered a record profit of $1,737,377 in 2007. The Roughriders exceeded the $22 million plateau in total operating revenue and expenditures. This figure eclipsed the previous mark of $15 million. Total net assets increased by $1,998,857 to $5,096,393. These earnings were due in part to the championship season the Roughriders sported, which included 8 home game sellouts and their first home playoff game in 19 years.

=== CFL draft ===
Round	Player	Position	School/Club team
1 (via Toronto)	Keith Shologan	Defensive Lineman	Central Florida Knights
2 (via Edmonton, via Toronto, via Edmonton)	Jonathan St. Pierre	Offensive Lineman	Illinois State Redbirds
2 (via BC)	Michael Stadnyk	Defensive Lineman	Montana Grizzlies
4 (via BC)	Jean-François Morin-Roberge	Offensive Lineman	Montreal Carabins
5	Jeff Zelinski	Defensive Back	Saint Mary's Huskies
6 (via Hamilton)	Teale Orban	Quarterback	Regina Rams

== Pre-season ==
Week	Date	Opponent	Score	Result	Attendance
A	Fri, June 13	BC Lions	33–13	Win	28,800
B	Thurs, June 19	at Edmonton Eskimos	37–7	Lost	33,508

== Regular season ==
=== Crowd trouble ===
On September 20, an unsportsmanlike incident occurred during a game in Saskatchewan. It started in the fourth quarter when Saskatchewan fans became angry about a B.C. play they thought should have been a face mask penalty. Lions defensive back Dante Marsh fired the ball into the stands, and Saskatchewan fans responded by pelting the Lions with full cans of beer. The incident occurred on the night when the Roughriders were honouring past CFL legend Ron Lancaster, who recently died at the age of 69. The club subsequently announced that in order to reduce the probability of a similar incident beer in the east stands (where the visitors bench is) would be sold in plastic cups for at least the remainder of the season.

=== Ron Lancaster ===
On Thursday, September 18, Ron Lancaster, 69, died from an apparent heart attack, less than two months after being diagnosed with lung cancer. The former Saskatchewan Roughriders quarterback, also had a long career as a head coach, with the Edmonton Eskimos and Hamilton Tiger Cats. He was diagnosed in late July and had been undergoing radiation and chemotherapy. Lancaster played 16 seasons with Saskatchewan, and led the team to five Grey Cup appearances. He led the club to their first CFL championship in 1966 when Saskatchewan upset the Ottawa Rough Riders 29–14. When he retired in 1978, at the age of 41, he was the league's all-time leader in passing yards (50,535), touchdown passes (333), pass attempts (6,223) and completions (3,384). He also suffered more interceptions than any other quarterback in CFL history. He had also passed for more yards than any passer in professional football history.

=== Season standings ===
West Division
Pos	Team	Pld	W	L	T	PF	PA	PD	Pts
1	Calgary Stampeders (C, Q)	18	13	5	0	595	420	+175	26
2	Saskatchewan Roughriders (Q)	18	12	6	0	500	471	+29	24
3	BC Lions (Q)	18	11	7	0	559	479	+80	22
4	Edmonton Eskimos (Q)	18	10	8	0	512	536	−24	20

Source: "2008 Regular Season Standings". Canadian Football League. Archived from the original on 2009-02-05.
(C) First round bye; (Q) Qualified for playoffs

=== Season schedule ===
Week	Date	Opponent	Score	Result	Attendance	Record
1	Sat, June 28	vs. Edmonton Eskimos	34–13	Win	28,800	1–0
2	Fri, July 4	at BC Lions	26–16	Win	33,815	2–0
3	Sat, July 12	at Hamilton Tiger-Cats	33–28	Win	20,874	3–0
4	Sat, July 19	vs. Montreal Alouettes	41–33	Win	28,800	4–0
5	Sun, July 27	vs. Toronto Argonauts	28–22	Win	28,800	5–0
6	Sat, Aug 2	at Calgary Stampeders	22–21	Win	35,650	6–0
7	Thurs, Aug 7	vs. Calgary Stampeders	30–25	Loss	28,800	6–1
8	Bye					
9	Thurs, Aug 21	at Edmonton Eskimos	27–10	Loss	48,808	6–2
‖10‖	Sun, Aug 31	vs. Winnipeg Blue Bombers	19–6	Win	30,985	7–2
11	Sun, Sept 7	at Winnipeg Blue Bombers	34–31	Win	29,770	8–2
12	Sat, Sept 13	at BC Lions	28–23	Loss	38,608	8–3
‖13‖	Sat, Sept 20	vs. BC Lions	27–21	Loss	30,945	8–4
14	Sun, Sept 28	at Montreal Alouettes	37–12	Loss	20,202	8–5
15	Fri, Oct 3	vs. Calgary Stampeders	37–34	Win	30,945	9–5
16	Mon, Oct 13	at Calgary Stampeders	42–5	Loss	35,650	9–6
‖17‖	Sun, Oct 19	vs. Hamilton Tiger-Cats	30–29	Win	30,945	10–6
18	Sat, Oct 25	vs. Edmonton Eskimos	55–9	Win	30,945	11–6
19	Thurs, Oct 30	at Toronto Argonauts	45–38	Win	28,654	12–6

# Games played with primary home uniforms.
# Games played with primary white uniforms.
‖#‖ Games played with green retro uniforms.

== Roster ==
2008 Saskatchewan Roughriders final roster
Quarterbacks: 17 Michael Bishop; 4 Darian Durant; 9 Steven Jyles; Running backs: 20 Wes Cates; 22 Stu Foord; 32 Neal Hughes; 33 Chris Szarka; Receivers: 6 Rob Bagg; 12 Adarius Bowman; 7 Weston Dressler; 83 Andy Fantuz; 89 Chris Getzlaf; 2 Corey Grant; 77 Michael Palmer	Offensive linemen: 67 Mike Abou-Mechrek G; 69 Glenn January T; 58 Belton Johnson T; 60 Gene Makowsky T/G; 63 Steve Morley T; 54 Jeremy O'Day C; 57 Marc Parenteau G/C; 52 Wayne Smith G; Defensive linemen: 51 Marcus Adams DT; 97 John Chick DE; 46 Kitwana Jones DE; 95 Luc Mullinder DT; 96 Scott Schultz DT; 93 Seante Williams DE; Special teams: 30 Jamie Boreham P/K; 10 Luca Congi K/P; 59 Jocelyn Frenette LS	Linebackers: 49 Yannick Carter; 47 Maurice Lloyd; 31 Sean Lucas; 45 Mike McCullough; 42 Anton McKenzie; 48 Renauld Williams; Defensive backs: 37 Tristan Clovis; 29 Eddie Davis; 15 Lance Frazier; 26 Scott Gordon; 19 James Johnson; 24 Tad Kornegay; 1 Omarr Morgan; 14 James Patrick; Reserve roster: 38 Hugh Charles RB; 91 Jimmy Verdon DT	Injured list: 90 Stevie Baggs DE; 92 Dek Bake DE; -- Dalton Bell QB; 80 Carl Berman SB; 66 Chris Best G; 27 Henri Childs RB; 39 Sebastian Clovis DB; 88 Matt Dominguez WR; 3 D. J. Flick SB; 21 Denatay Heard DB; 35 Brandon Lynch LB; 85 David McKoy WR; 25 Leron Mitchell DB; -- Jean-François Morin-Roberge T; 18 Adam Nicolson SB; -- Kevin Scott LS; 74 Keith Shologan DT; 80 Gerran Walker WR; Italics indicate American player

=== Notable transactions ===
Date	Type	Incoming	Outgoing	Team
September 6, 2008	Free Agent Signing	Adam Nicolson, Slotback	N/A	British Columbia Lions (2007)
August 28, 2008	Release	N/A	Marcus Crandell, Quarterback	Saskatchewan Roughriders
August 23, 2008	Trade	Michael Bishop, Quarterback	Conditional 2011 CFL Canadian Draft choice	Toronto Argonauts
July 24, 2008	Free Agent Signing (for 2009)	Kye Stewart, Linebacker	N/A	Illinois State (NCAA) (2007)
July 17, 2008	Release	N/A	Amariah Farrow, Offensive Lineman	Saskatchewan Roughriders
July 8, 2008	Release	N/A	Airabin Justin, Defensive Back	Saskatchewan Roughriders
July 7, 2008	Trade	T.J. Acree, Wide Receiver; Rights to Brian Smith, Defensive Lineman; Argonauts' Third Round Canadian Draft Choice In 2011	Ronald Flemons, Defensive End; Roughriders' Fifth Round Canadian Draft Choice In 2011	Toronto Argonauts
June 28, 2008	Draft Pick Signing	Keith Shologan, Defensive Lineman	N/A	San Diego Chargers (NFL) (2008)
June 18, 2008	Release	N/A	Brock Stratton, Linebacker	Saskatchewan Roughriders
June 6, 2008	Release	N/A	Quinton Jones, Defensive Back	Saskatchewan Roughriders
June 5, 2008	Trade	Leron Mitchell, Cornerback	Jamal Robertson, Running Back	Toronto Argonauts
June 2, 2008	Retirement	N/A	Tim Fleiszer, Defensive Line	Saskatchewan Roughriders
June 2, 2008	Retirement	N/A	Kennedy Nkeyasen, Defensive Back	Saskatchewan Roughriders
June 1, 2008	Free Agent Signing	Denatay Heard, Defensive Back	N/A	Stillman College (NCAA) (2007)
June 1, 2008	Trade	Future Considerations and a Negotiation List Player	Kevin Garrett, Defensive Back	Winnipeg Blue Bombers
June 1, 2008	Release	N/A	Jason Mitchell, Wide Receiver	Saskatchewan Roughriders
May 31, 2008	Release	N/A	T.J. Stancil, Linebacker	Saskatchewan Roughriders
May 26, 2008	Free Agent Signing	Adarius Bowman, Wide Receiver	N/A	Oklahoma State (NCAA) (2007)
May 26, 2008	Free Agent Signing	Stu Foord, Wide Receiver	N/A	Regina Thunder (CJFL) (2007)
May 26, 2008	Free Agent Signing	Brad Peters, Offensive Lineman	N/A	Saskatoon Hilltops (CJFL) (2007)
May 11, 2008	Free Agent Signing	Weston Dressler, Wide Receiver	N/A	North Dakota (NCAA) (2007)
May 5, 2008	Free Agent Signing	Kevin Scott, Offensive Lineman/Long Snapper	N/A	Queen's (CIS) (2007)
April 1, 2008	Free Agent Signing	Kevin Garrett, Defensive Back	N/A	Calgary Stampeders
March 12, 2008	Free Agent Signing	Omarr Morgan, Defensive Back	N/A	Edmonton Eskimos
March 5, 2008	Trade	Glenn January, Offensive Tackle; Ronald Flemons, Defensive Lineman; Argonauts first round selection in the 2008 CFL Draft; Argonauts second round selection in the 2010 CFL Draft	Kerry Joseph, Quarterback; Riders third round pick in the 2010 CFL Draft	Toronto Argonauts
March 4, 2008	Free Agent Signing	Brock Stratton, Linebacker	N/A	Texas Tech (NCAA) (2006)
February 27, 2008	Free Agent Signing	N/A	Jovon Johnson, Defensive Back	Erie RiverRats (AIFA)
February 19, 2008	Free Agent Signing	N/A	Reggie Hunt, Linebacker	Montreal Alouettes
February 8, 2008	Trade	Steven Jyles, Quarterback	Fred Perry, Defensive End	Edmonton Eskimos
January 31, 2008	Retirement	N/A	Val St. Germain, Offensive Lineman	N/A
January 29, 2008	Release	N/A	Corey Holmes, Running Back	N/A
January 29, 2008	Free Agent Signing	Quinton Jones, Defensive Back	N/A	San Diego Chargers (NFL) (2007)
January 29, 2008	Free Agent Signing	James Patrick, Defensive Back	N/A	New England Patriots (NFL) (2007)
January 23, 2008	Free Agent Signing	Rob Bagg, Wide Receiver	N/A	Queen's (CIS) (2007)
January 23, 2008	Free Agent Signing	Jason Mitchell, Wide Receiver	N/A	USC (NCAA) (2006)
November 28, 2007	Retirement	N/A	Yo Murphy, Wide Receiver	N/A

== Player stats ==
=== Passing ===
Player	Att	Comp	%	Yards	TD	INT	Rating
Michael Bishop	274	160	58.4	2550	10	13	81.9
Darian Durant	129	77	59.7	1122	7	6	86.8
Marcus Crandell	128	67	52.3	924	7	3	84.3
Steven Jyles	61	42	68.9	533	4	6	76.7
Andy Fantuz	1	0	0.0	0	0	1	(−414.6)

=== Rushing ===
Player	No.	Yards	Average	TD	Fumbles
Wes Cates	216	1229	5.7	12	4
Michael Bishop	46	244	5.3	4	5
Darian Durant	27	204	7.6	1	1
Stuart Foord	27	162	6.0	2	0
Neal Hughes	35	130	3.7	4	1

=== Receiving ===
Player	No.	Yards	Avg.	Long	TD
Weston Dressler	56	1123	20.1	67	6
Andy Fantuz	36	488	13.6	31	3
Wes Cates	39	451	11.6	40	2
Rob Bagg	22	371	16.9	72	0
Adarius Bowman	23	358	15.6	73	3

== Awards and records ==
- The Roughriders started the season 6–0 for the first time since 1934.
- Wes Cates, Led CFL, Rushing Touchdowns (12)
- Weston Dressler (SB), Saskatchewan Roughriders – CFL's Most Outstanding Rookie Award
- Jeremy O'Day (C), Saskatchewan Roughriders – Tom Pate Memorial Award

=== CFL All-Star Selections ===
- Wes Cates, Running Back
- Gene Makowsky, Offensive Guard
- Anton McKenzie, Linebacker
- Maurice Lloyd, Linebacker

=== CFL West All-Star Selections ===
- Wes Cates, Running Back
- Gene Makowsky, Offensive Guard
- Anton McKenzie, Linebacker
- Maurice Lloyd, Linebacker

== Playoffs ==
=== West Semi-Final ===
Date and time: Saturday, November 8, 3:30 PM Central Standard Time
Venue: Mosaic Stadium at Taylor Field, Regina, Saskatchewan

Team	Q1	Q2	Q3	Q4	Total
BC Lions	7	9	10	7	33
Saskatchewan Roughriders	0	6	3	3	12
