= 2009 Saskatchewan Roughriders season =

CFL team season

- General manager: Eric Tillman
- Head coach: Ken Miller
- Home stadium: Mosaic Stadium at Taylor Field

Results
- Record: 10–7–1
- Division place: 1st, West
- Playoffs: Lost Grey Cup
- Team MOP: Darian Durant
- Team MOC: Rob Bagg
- Team MOR: Jerrell Freeman

Uniform

The 2009 Saskatchewan Roughriders season was the 52nd season for the team in the Canadian Football League (CFL). The Roughriders attempted to win their fourth Grey Cup championship but lost to the Alouettes in the Grey Cup final.

During the 2009 Grey Cup on the second last play of the game, Sean Lucas of the Saskatchewan Roughriders, lined up as a slot back, behind a defensive linesman, during the missed kick attempt by Montreal. With 11 players already on the defensive line, and with 1 player, Jason Armstead, in the end-zone to return any missed kicks, Sean Lucas, a defensive linebacker, was on the field as a defender, & therefore, the 13th man on the field, causing the penalty on the play, and providing Montreal with another opportunity to win the 2009 Grey Cup.

The Roughriders finished the season in first place for the first time since 1976 and finished with a 10–7–1 record. As of the 2025 CFL season, the 2009 season marks the first of only three instances since 1976 that the Roughriders won their division and hosted the West Final as a member team of the CFL. They have since won the Western Division crown during the 2019 season and the 2025 season.

== Off-season ==
=== CFL draft ===
The 2009 CFL draft took place on May 2, 2009. Due to a series of trades, the Roughriders had only two draft picks. Both were selected from the local University of Regina Rams team.

Round	Pick	Player	Position	School/Club team
2	9	Tamon George	DB	Regina
3	17	Nick Hutchins	OL	Regina

=== Preseason ===
Week	Date	Opponent	Score	Result	Attendance
A	Wed, June 17	at Edmonton Eskimos	45-12	Loss	34,793
B	Tues, June 23	vs. Calgary Stampeders	27-19	Loss	29,107

== Regular season ==
=== Standings ===
West Division
Pos	Team	Pld	W	L	T	PF	PA	PD	Pts
1	Saskatchewan Roughriders (C, Q)	18	10	7	1	514	484	+30	21
2	Calgary Stampeders (Q)	18	10	7	1	514	443	+71	21
3	Edmonton Eskimos (Q)	18	9	9	0	469	502	−33	18
4	BC Lions (Q)	18	8	10	0	431	502	−71	16

Source: "2009 Regular Season Standings". Canadian Football League. Archived from the original on 2010-02-09.
(C) First round bye; (Q) Qualified for playoffs

Saskatchewan finished ahead of Calgary in the standings because they went 2-0-1 in their 3-game head-to-head series.

=== Season schedule ===
Week	Date	Opponent	Score	Result	Attendance	Record
1	Fri, July 3	vs. BC Lions	28-24	Win	30,062	1–0
2	Sat, July 11	at Toronto Argonauts	46-36	Win	30,055	2–0
▸ 3 ◂	Sat, July 18	vs. Montreal Alouettes	43-10	Loss	30,945	2–1
4	Sat, July 25	vs. Edmonton Eskimos	38-33	Loss	30,945	2–2
5	Sat, Aug 1	at Calgary Stampeders	24-23	Win	35,650	3–2
6	Fri, Aug 7	at BC Lions	35-20	Loss	30,117	3–3
7	Sun, Aug 16	vs. Hamilton Tiger-Cats	33-23	Win	30,360	4–3
▸ 8 ◂	Fri, Aug 21	at Montreal Alouettes	34-25	Loss	20,202	4–4
9	Bye					
▪ 10 ▪	Sun, Sept 6	vs. Winnipeg Blue Bombers	29-14	Win	30,945	5–4
11	Sun, Sept 13	at Winnipeg Blue Bombers	55-10	Win	29,533	6–4
12	Sun, Sept 20	vs. Edmonton Eskimos	31-27	Loss	30,945	6–5
13	Sat, Sept 26	at Edmonton Eskimos	23-20	Win	62,517	7–5
14	Fri, Oct 2	at BC Lions	19-16	Loss	31,958	7–6
15	Sat, Oct 10	vs. Toronto Argonauts	32-22	Win	29,361	8–6
16	Sat, Oct 17	at Calgary Stampeders	44-44 (2OT)	Tie	38,623	8–6–1
17	Sat, Oct 24	vs. BC Lions	33-30 (OT)	Win	30,945	9–6–1
18	Sat, Oct 31	at Hamilton Tiger-Cats	24-6	Loss	24,586	9–7–1
19	Sat, Nov 7	vs. Calgary Stampeders	30-14	Win	30,945	10–7–1

# Games played with primary home uniforms.
# Games played with primary white uniforms.
▪ # ▪ Games played with green retro 60s uniforms.
▸ # ◂ Games played with white retro 60s uniforms.

== Roster ==
2009 Saskatchewan Roughriders final roster
Quarterbacks: 12 Dalton Bell; 4 Darian Durant; 9 Steven Jyles; Running backs: 20 Wes Cates; 22 Stu Foord; 32 Neal Hughes; 33 Chris Szarka; Receivers: 2 Jason Armstead; 6 Rob Bagg; 82 Jason Clermont; 83 Andy Fantuz; 89 Chris Getzlaf; 85 David McKoy; 18 Adam Nicolson; 80 Gerran Walker	Offensive linemen: 65 Joel Bell G; 66 Chris Best G; 63 Bobby Harris T; 60 Gene Makowsky T/G; 54 Jeremy O'Day C; 57 Marc Parenteau G/C; Defensive linemen: 51 Marcus Adams DT; 90 Stevie Baggs DE; 97 John Chick DE; 50 Jerrell Freeman DE; 26 Kitwana Jones DE; 95 Luc Mullinder DE/DT; 74 Keith Shologan DT	Linebackers: 24 Tad Kornegay; 31 Sean Lucas; 45 Mike McCullough; 48 Renauld Williams; Defensive backs: 5 Donovan Alexander; 29 Eddie Davis; 15 Lance Frazier; 39 Chris McKenzie; 25 Leron Mitchell; 1 Omarr Morgan; 14 James Patrick; Special teams: 10 Luca Congi K/P; 59 Jocelyn Frenette LS; 42 Louie Sakoda P/K	Reserve roster: 38 Hugh Charles RB; 72 Kevin Scott LS; 98 Joe Sykes DE; 68 Cliff Washburn T; Practice roster: 17 Cole Bergquist QB; 67 Dan Clark G; 91 Willie Evans DE; -- Lavarus Giles RB; 69 Nick Hutchins G; 99 Vaalyn Jackson DT; 3 Chris Jones WR; 26 LaDarius Key DB; 49 Joel Lipinski DB; 93 Josh Miller DT; -- Kent Smith QB; 28 Marcus Thigpen RB	Injured list: 27 Carlos Armour LB; 30 Jamie Boreham P/K; 7 Weston Dressler SB; 35 Daniel Francis DB; 37 Tamon George DB; 62 Antonio Hall G; -- Graham Harrell QB; 21 Denatay Heard DB; 58 Belton Johnson T; 3 Eric Morris SB; 81 Johnny Quinn WR; 64 Jordan Rempel G/T; 52 Wayne Smith G; 61 Jonathan St. Pierre G; 82 Mike Stadnyk DE; 46 Kye Stewart LB; 11 Aaron Wagner LB; Italics indicate International player Roster updated 2026-04-22

=== Notable Transactions ===
Date	Type	Incoming	Outgoing	Team
August 4	Retired	N/A	Scott Schultz	Saskatchewan Roughriders

== Player stats ==
=== Passing ===
Player	Att	Comp	%	Yards	TD	INT	Rating
Darian Durant	562	339	60.3%	4348	24	21	83.3
Steven Jyles	40	25	62.5%	290	1	2	71.9
Jason Armstead	1	1	100.0%	34	1	0	158.3
Weston Dressler	1	0	0.0%	0	0	0	2.1

=== Rushing ===
Player	No.	Yards	Average	TD	Fumbles
Wes Cates	195	932	4.8	5	2
Darian Durant	60	502	8.4	3	5
Hugh Charles	35	136	3.9	3	2
Stu Foord	25	135	5.4	1	1
Steven Jyles	24	102	4.3	4	0
Chris Szarka	15	78	5.2	6	0
Weston Dressler	11	63	5.7	1	0

=== Receiving ===
Player	No.	Yards	Avg.	Long	TD
Weston Dressler	62	941	15.2	52	4
Andy Fantuz	67	882	13.2	40	4
Rob Bagg	59	807	13.7	60	5
Chris Getzlaf	41	531	13.0	65	6
Gerran Walker	36	401	11.1	43	2

== Awards ==
Regular Season
Date	Player	Award
July 7, 2009	Stevie Baggs	Defensive Player of the Week
August 4, 2009	Chris Getzlaf	Canadian Player of the Week
August 18, 2009	John Chick	Defensive Player of the Week
August 23, 2009	Stevie Baggs	Defensive Player of the Week
September 2, 2009	Stevie Baggs	Defensive Player of the Month
September 15, 2009	Luca Congi	Special Teams Player of the Week
September 29, 2009	Andy Fantuz	Canadian Player of the Week
September 30, 2009	Luca Congi	Special Teams Player of the Month
October 14, 2009	Mike McCullough	Canadian Player of the Week
October 20, 2009	Stevie Baggs	Defensive Player of the Week
October 20, 2009	Jason Armstead	Special Teams Player of the Week
October 20, 2009	Andy Fantuz	Canadian Player of the Week
October 27, 2009	Rob Bagg	Canadian Player of the Week
November 10, 2009	John Chick	Defensive Player of the Week
November 10, 2009	Andy Fantuz	Canadian Player of the Week
November 11, 2009	Andy Fantuz	Canadian Player of the Month
November 12, 2009	John Chick	Norm Fieldgate Trophy (West Division Most Outstanding Defensive Player)

=== CFL All-Star Selections ===
- John Chick, Defensive End
- Gene Makowsky, Offensive Guard
- Jeremy O'Day, Centre

=== CFL West All-Star Selections ===
- Stevie Baggs, Defensive End
- John Chick, Defensive End
- Weston Dressler, Receiver
- Darian Durant, Quarterback
- Lance Frazier, Defensive Back
- Tad Kornegay, Linebacker
- Sean Lucas, Linebacker
- Gene Makowsky, Offensive Guard
- Jeremy O'Day, Centre

== Playoffs ==
=== Schedule ===
Week	Game	Date	Time	Opponent	Score	Result	Attendance
20	West Semi-Final	Bye					
‖ 21 ‖	West Final	November 22	3:30 PM CST	Calgary Stampeders	27-17	Win	30,945
‖ 22 ‖	97th Grey Cup	November 29	5:30 PM CST	Montreal Alouettes	28-27	Loss	46,020

ǁ # ǁ Games played with retro 70s alternate uniforms.

=== Bracket ===
November 15: Division Semifinals
East
W4	BC Lions	34*
E2	Hamilton Tiger-Cats	27
West
W3	Edmonton Eskimos	21
W2	Calgary Stampeders	24

November 22: Division Finals
W4	BC Lions	18
E1	Montreal Alouettes	56
W2	Calgary Stampeders	17
W1	Saskatchewan Roughriders	27

November 29: 97th Grey Cup; McMahon Stadium – Calgary
E1	Montreal Alouettes	28
W1	Saskatchewan Roughriders	27

*-Team won in Overtime.

=== West Final ===
Date and time: Sunday, November 22, 4:30 PM Mountain Standard Time
Venue: Mosaic Stadium, Regina, Saskatchewan

Team	Q1	Q2	Q3	Q4	Total
Calgary Stampeders	3	7	1	6	17
Saskatchewan Roughriders	0	10	14	3	27
