= Ryan Lucas =

Ryan Lucas may refer to:

- Ryan Lucas (Canadian football) (born 1984), Canadian football defensive tackle
- Ryan Lucas (Barbadian footballer) (born 1977), footballer who played in North America and for the Barbados national football team
