= Lerone =

Lerone is a given name. Notable people with the name include:

- Lerone Bennett Jr. (1928–2019), African-American scholar, author, and social historian
- Lerone Clarke (born 1981), Jamaican track runner
- Lerone Murphy (born 1991), English mixed martial artist

== See also ==
- Leron
