= Wes Cates =

American gridiron football player (born 1979)

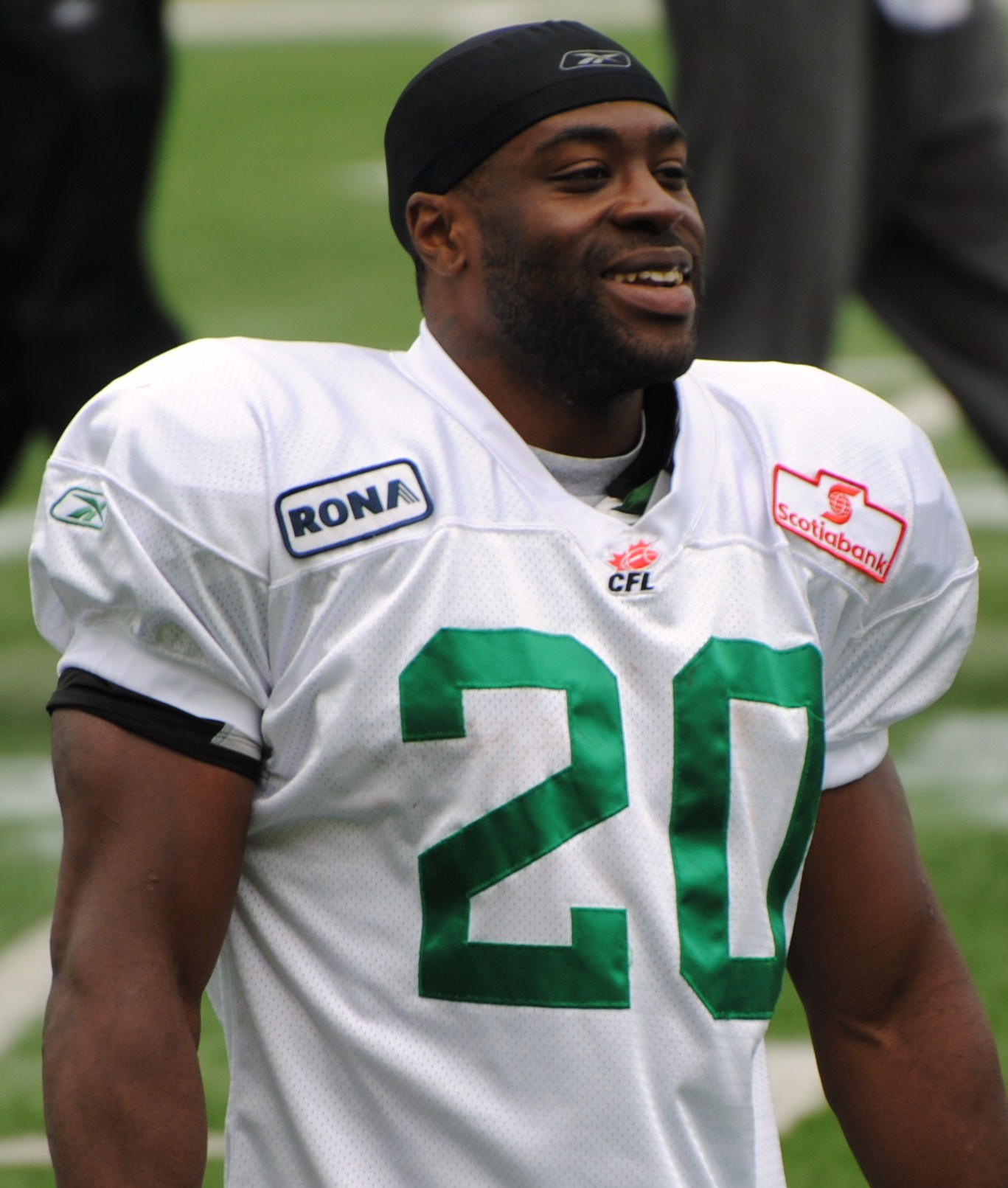
- Cates with the Saskatchewan Roughriders in 2010

No. 20
- Position: Running back

Personal information
- Born: October 3, 1979 (age 47); Columbus, Ohio, U.S.
- Listed height: 6 ft 0 in (1.83 m)
- Listed weight: 215 lb (98 kg)

Career information
- College: California (PA)

Career history
- 2006: Calgary Stampeders
- 2007–2011: Saskatchewan Roughriders

Awards and highlights
- Grey Cup champion (2007); CFL All-Star (2008); 2× CFL West All-Star (2008, 2010)
- Stats at CFL.ca (archive)

Wes Cates (born October 3, 1979) is an American former professional football running back who played in the Canadian Football League (CFL).

== College career ==
Cates attended California University of Pennsylvania and graduated in 2001 without ever missing a game in his four-year career. He had 5,647 total yards, a Pennsylvania State Athletic Conference (PSAC) record, on 937 carries, 63 rushing touchdowns and 386 total points, all school records. He was an All-American for the last two years of his college career and he led the PSAC in rushing for three of his four seasons. Cates was also the PSAC-West Offensive Player of the Year in 2001 and he led the PSAC in rushing for three seasons. He was a PSAC-West first team All-Star selection for three years and he was also nominated for the Harlon Hill Award for best player in division 2 in his sophomore and senior seasons. A 1999 and 2001 All-American, Cates was drafted into the university's Athletic Hall of Fame in his first eligible year.

== Professional career ==
Cates made his professional debut in 2006 after signing a contract with the Calgary Stampeders of the Canadian Football League. He dressed for 17 of the Stampeders' 18 regular season games, but he did not get much playing time. He finished the season with only 25 rushing attempts for 181 yards and two touchdowns, while also catching 21 passes for 286 yards and one touchdown.

Just before the 2007 season began, Cates was traded to the Saskatchewan Roughriders. Cates immediately turned into a fan favourite and a hero to many with his speed and determination. He ran for 866 yards on 153 carries, caught 45 passes for 452 yards and scored five touchdowns. During the 2007 playoffs, Cates rushed for 128 yards on 25 attempts with a broken foot and he helped the Saskatchewan Roughriders win the Grey Cup Championship.

In 2008, Cates rushed for 1229 yards, amassed 451 receiving yards and scored 16 touchdowns. He earned a spot on the CFL All-Star team for his accomplishments and ranked second in the most rushing yards.

Prior to the 2009 CFL season, Cates underwent surgery to repair a torn labrum in his right shoulder and had been considered questionable to start the 2009 Saskatchewan Roughriders season.

In February 2012, after 6 CFL seasons, Cates was not offered a new contract with the Saskatchewan Roughriders.

== Transactions ==
- 2006 – Signed as a free agent by the Calgary Stampeders
- 2007 – Traded to the Saskatchewan Roughriders for Rob Lazeo and a conditional draft pick

== Career statistics ==
| Rushing | | Regular season | | | | | | Playoffs |
| Year | Team | Games | No. | Yards | Avg | Long | TD | Games | No. | Yards | Avg | Long | TD |
|---|---|---|---|---|---|---|---|---|---|---|---|---|---|
| 2006 | CGY | 17 | 25 | 181 | 7.2 | 64 | 2 | 1 | 0 | 0 | 0.0 | 0 | 0 |
| 2007 | SSK | 14 | 152 | 866 | 5.7 | 49 | 5 | 2 | 25 | 128 | 5.1 | 22 | 0 |
| 2008 | SSK | 15 | 216 | 1229 | 5.7 | 49 | 12 | 1 | 9 | 23 | 2.6 | 4 | 0 |
| 2009 | SSK | 16 | 195 | 932 | 4.8 | 37 | 5 | 2 | 27 | 148 | 5.5 | 17 | 0 |
| 2010 | SSK | 18 | 203 | 1054 | 5.2 | 83 | 15 | 3 | 37 | 208 | 5.6 | 24 | 3 |
| 2011 | SSK | 14 | 138 | 680 | 4.9 | 32 | 4 |
| CFL totals | | 94 | 930 | 4,942 | 5.3 | 83 | 43 | 9 | 98 | 507 | 5.2 | 24 | 3 |
