= Rob Bagg =

Canadian football player (born 1985)

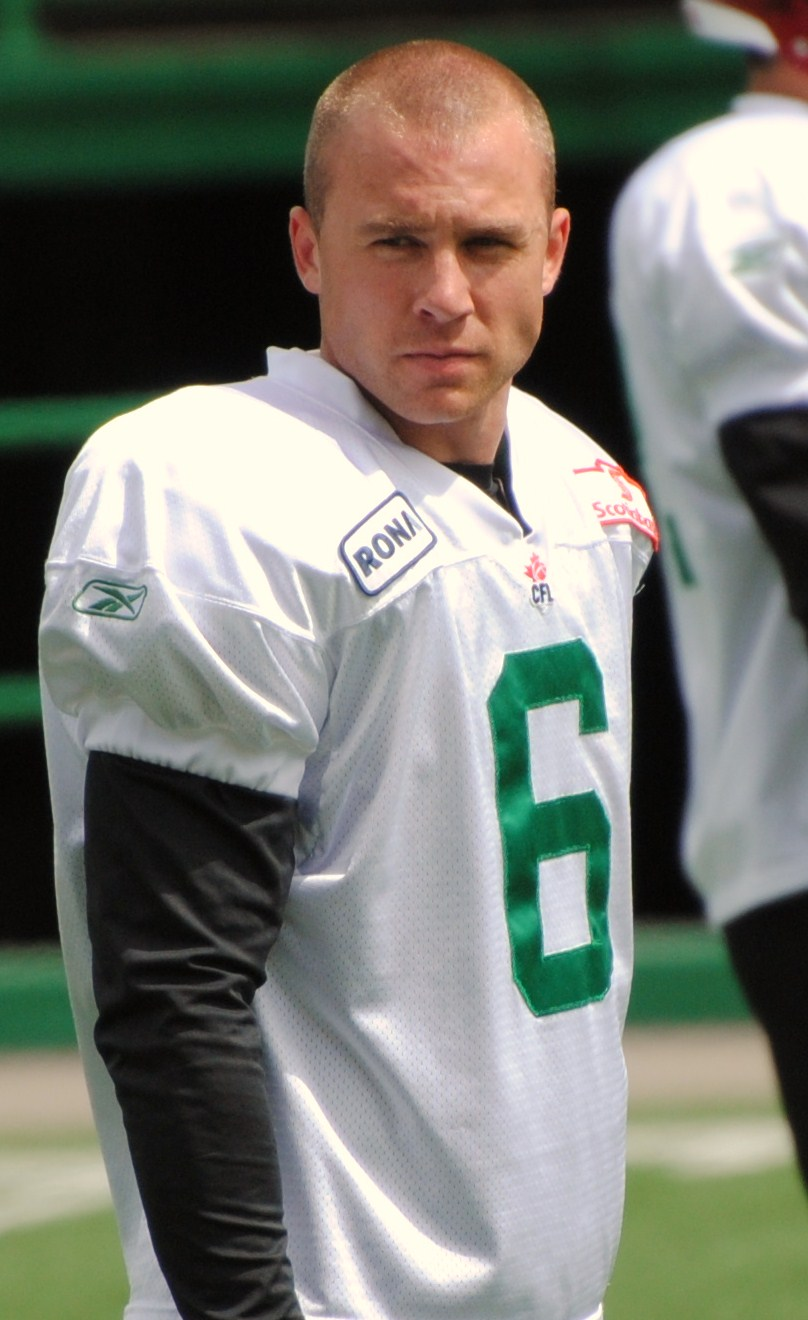
- Bagg with the Saskatchewan Roughriders in 2010

No. 6
- Position: Wide receiver

Personal information
- Born: February 3, 1985 (age 41); Kingston, Ontario, Canada
- Listed height: 6 ft 0 in (1.83 m)
- Listed weight: 192 lb (87 kg)

Career information
- High school: Frontenac
- University: Queen's
- CFL draft: 2007: undrafted

Career history
- 2008–2018: Saskatchewan Roughriders

Awards and highlights
- Grey Cup champion (2013); CFL West All-Star (2014)
- Stats at CFL.ca

Rob Bagg (born February 3, 1985) is a Canadian former professional football wide receiver who played 11 seasons for the Saskatchewan Roughriders of the Canadian Football League (CFL) from 2008 to 2018. He was a member of the 101st Grey Cup winning team and was named a West Division All-Star in 2014. Bagg played CIS football for the Queen's Gaels football team.

== Early life ==
Bagg attended Frontenac Secondary School in Kingston, Ontario from 1999 to 2003. After running for the cross-country team in grades 9 and 10, new to the sport of football at age 16, Bagg joined the Frontenac Falcons Senior Football Team in his grade 11 year. Sporting the school's garnet and grey colours, Bagg helped the team to win not only their division finals (EOSSA), but also the Provincial finals (OFSAA) at the National Capital Bowl in the then 'Sky Dome', now the Rogers Centre in both of his senior years.

== University career ==
In 2003, Bagg attended Queen's University, joining the school's football team that same year. In 2005, he played in six games, recording 17 catches for 166 yards as well as returning seven punts for 157 yards and six kickoffs for 67 yards. In 2006, Bagg played in all eight games and ranked 12th in the country in receiving yards, recording 30 receptions for 565 yards and four touchdowns. He was also featured more on special teams, returning 58 punts for 412 yards and 13 kickoffs for 328 yards.

After the 2006 season concluded, Bagg went undrafted in the 2007 CFL draft. He was high on the Saskatchewan Roughriders list, but with only two draft picks and already selecting receiver David McKoy, they did not draft him. Instead, he signed with the team shortly after the draft and attended the 2007 training camp with the Roughriders. After making the roster, he declined the position in order to return to the Gaels for a fifth season. The Roughriders would win the Grey Cup that year.

For the Golden Gaels' 2007 season, Bagg led the team in receiving, and was fifth in the country, playing in seven games with 36 catches for 804 yards and six touchdowns. That includes a 341-yard receiving game against the Toronto Varsity Blues where he also caught three touchdown passes. This single game performance is the second most receiving yards in a game in CIS history, behind former Queen's receiver James MacLean. Being the team's top receiver, he saw less time on special teams, returning 13 punts for 192 yards and six kickoffs for 130 yards.

== Professional career ==
On January 23, 2008, Bagg signed with the Saskatchewan Roughriders, the team that had expressed interest in him before the 2007 season. After again making the active roster out of training camp, Bagg dressed as a receiver for 16 games in 2008. After a plethora of injuries at the receiver position, Bagg was pressed into service during the Banjo Bowl versus the Winnipeg Blue Bombers where he recorded his first CFL reception and finished the game with six catches for 52 yards in the Roughriders' comeback win. He had an explosive game against Montreal where he had six catches for 146 yards, including a 72-yard reception, and was named the CFL's Canadian Player of the Week. He finished the regular season with 22 catches for 371 yards. His debut season was peculiarly marked by his bad luck near the end zone. Bagg was stopped at the three-, two-, and one-yard lines after making catches, stopping just short of his first CFL touchdowns. He also had two catches for 18 yards in the Roughriders' West Semi-Final loss to the BC Lions.

With the Roughriders electing not to re-sign Corey Grant for the 2009 season, Bagg took over the wideside wide receiver spot he vacated. Bagg had a decent start to the season until he had a 120-yard receiving game against the BC Lions where he caught his first and second career CFL touchdowns, after meeting futility in 2008. After an injury to Weston Dressler in week 15, Bagg started at slotback the next week and shortside wide receiver the two weeks following, before finishing the season at his familiar wideside spot. Showcasing his versatility, he had another 100-yard receiving game against BC while at the shortside receiver position with a season-high 124 yards and a touchdown. Finishing the season with 59 catches for 807 yards and five touchdowns, Bagg was named the Roughriders' nominee for Most Outstanding Canadian after his breakout year. Additionally, Bagg led the offense with six defensive tackles and had two special teams tackles and a forced fumble. In the West Final game, Bagg had three catches for 73 yards and a touchdown, while in the loss to Montreal in the 2009 Grey Cup, he recorded three receptions for 27 yards and one carry for 13 yards. In the 2010 season, in a game against the Calgary Stampeders Bagg had a season-ending injury, which also kept him out of all of the 2011 season. Just as it appeared as though Bagg was going to return to the Riders for the 2011 CFL season he re-injured his left ACL in off-season training, which caused him to miss the entire 2011 season. After recovering from injuring his left knee twice Bagg worked his way back into the lineup for the 2012 CFL season. However, he tore his right knee in Week 3 and had to once again miss the rest of a season due to surgery.

Bagg returned to the Riders lineup for the 2013 CFL season and earned Canadian Player of the Week honors for Week 4. In Week 3, Bagg had his first CFL touchdown since 2010, and in Week 4 had a 2 touchdown performance. However, in Week 8 against the Alouettes, Bagg injured his knee while blocking downfield on a running play. The extent of his knee injury was diagnosed as a 'knee sprain', he returned to the active roster after missing four games. By the close of the 2013 season Bagg played in 16 games of the regular season, recording 34 catches for 430 yards with 4 receiving touchdowns. After the end of the season, Bagg signed a contract extension with the Roughriders, keeping him in Saskatchewan through the 2015 season. Bagg was released by the Riders in the week before the start of the 2018 season. He was re-signed by the Roughriders on August 15, 2018.

Bagg announced his retirement on September 17, 2019.

== Statistics ==
Receiving		Regular season						Playoffs
Year	Team	Games	No.	Yards	Avg	Long	TD	Games	No.	Yards	Avg	Long	TD
2008	SSK	9	22	371	16.9	72	0	1	2	18	9.0	15	0
2009	SSK	18	59	807	13.7	60	5	2	6	100	16.7	42	1
2010	SSK	15	44	688	15.6	87	3	Did not play
2011	SSK	0	0	0	0	0	0	Team did not qualify
2012	SSK	3	9	69	7.7	20	0	Did not play
2013	SSK	17	35	442	12.6	60	4	3	5	23	4.6	11	1
2014	SSK	18	55	803	14.6	42	3	1	3	29	9.7	12	0
2015	SSK	18	50	537	10.7	38	4	Team did not qualify
2016	SSK	17	57	658	11.5	48	4	Team did not qualify
2017	SSK	17	35	339	9.7	30	1	2	2	15	7.5	9	0
2018	SSK	2	0	0	0	0	0
CFL totals		134	364	4,705	12.9	87	24	9	18	185	10.3	42	2
