= Sean Lucas =

Canadian football player (born 1983)

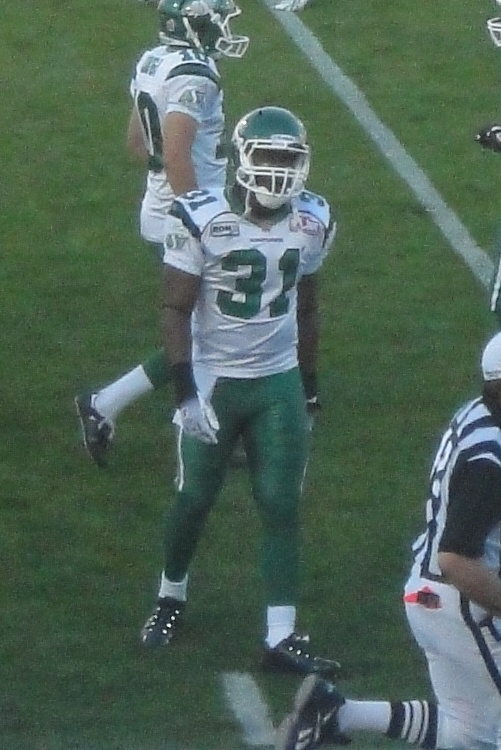
- Lucas with the Saskatchewan Roughriders in 2010

Profile
- Position: Linebacker

Personal information
- Born: December 8, 1983 (age 42); Atlanta, Georgia, U.S.
- Listed height: 5 ft 11 in (1.80 m)
- Listed weight: 202 lb (92 kg)

Career information
- College: Tulane

Career history
- 2006–2011: Saskatchewan Roughriders

Awards and highlights
- Grey Cup champion (2007); CFL West All-Star (2009)
- Stats at CFL.ca (archive)

Sean Christopher Lucas (born December 8, 1983) is an American former professional football linebacker who played all six years of his career for the Saskatchewan Roughriders of the Canadian Football League (CFL). He was a part of Saskatchewan's Grey Cup win in 2007 and was named a CFL West All-Star in 2009. Lucas was widely regarded as the Saskatchewan player at the centre of the infamous 13th Man incident that cost the club the championship in 2009. Lucas was named in football circles as the extra player who was on the field when Montreal kicker Damon Duval missed a 43-yard field goal as time expired, seemingly giving Saskatchewan the win. But Duval got a second chance from 33 yards after the Riders were penalized for too many men. Duval converted to give Montreal a thrilling 28-27 victory. The Riders have never said who the extra man was, but video replays did show Lucas start off the field, then turn and stay on for Duval's attempt in the most heart-breaking finish in Grey Cup history.

Lucas was signed as a free agent by Saskatchewan in 2006, and he spent most of 2006 CFL season as a member of their practice roster. He made his professional debut in the final week of the season in Edmonton against the Eskimos. He has since earned a starting spot as an outside linebacker for the Roughriders and was named a CFL West Division All-Star in 2009. In college football, he played for Tulane University.

== Career statistics ==
Defence			Tackles			Interceptions
Year	League	Team	No.	STT	Sacks	No.	Yards	Long	TD
2006	CFL	SSK	3	0	0	0	0	0	0
2007	CFL	SSK	61	6	2	1	0	0	0
2008	CFL	SSK	95	3	0	1	4	4	0
2009	CFL	SSK	84	4	4	2	0	9	0
2010	CFL	SSK	71	8	1	0	0	0	0
2011	CFL	SSK	61	2	0	1	0	3	0
Totals			372	23	7	5	0	9	0
