= Westchester Knicks =

American professional basketball team of the NBA G League

- 2024–25 NBA G League season
- Conference: Eastern
- League: NBA G League
- Founded: 2014
- History: Westchester Knicks; 2014–present
- Arena: Westchester County Center
- Location: White Plains, New York
- Team colors: Blue, orange, silver, white
- General manager: Allan Houston
- Head coach: DeSagana Diop
- Ownership: New York Knicks
- Affiliation: New York Knicks
- Division/conference titles: 1 (2018)
- Showcase titles: 2 (2023, 2024)
- Website: westchester.gleague.nba.com

The Westchester Knicks are an American professional basketball team in the NBA G League based in White Plains, New York. They are affiliated with the New York Knicks, and play their home games at Westchester County Center.

The Knicks became the seventh D-League team to be owned by an NBA team and replaced the Erie BayHawks as the Knicks' D-League affiliate.

The Knicks had filed for trademarks for five possible names: New York 914s, New York 'Bockers, New York Plainsmen, New York Empire, and New York Hutch. On May 14, 2014, the Westchester Knicks name and logo were announced; in addition to retaining the parent club's "Knicks" name, the Knicks had also incorporated the original "Father Knickerbocker" logo (drawn by Willard Mullin) which was in use by the parent Knicks from the team's founding in 1946 until 1964. The logo later changed to the current one, which resembles the New York Knicks' current logo. The team began play in the 2014-2015 season, playing its first home game at Westchester County Center on November 19, 2014.

== History ==
=== 2014–15 season ===
On September 3, 2014, the Westchester Knicks acquired 16 players on the 2014 NBA Development League Expansion Draft. On October 13 Kevin Whitted was named as the first coach of Westchester. On November 1, in the 2014 NBA D-League Draft, the Westchester Knicks made second-round guard Joseph Bertrand their first ever selection. On November 16 they made their regular season debut in an 84–91 loss against the local Oklahoma City Blue. Three days later they made their home debut, again losing, this time against the Canton Charge on an 84–88 affair. Their first win came on November 21 against the Grand Rapids Drive in their third game, which they won by 97–83 at home.

On January 7, 2015, Langston Galloway signed a 10-day contract with the New York Knicks, becoming the first player to be called up to the NBA in franchise history.

On March 30, 2015, the Knicks announced via Twitter that head coach Kevin Whitted was relieved of his duties and that assistant coach Craig Hodges would serve as the interim head coach for the final week of the 2014–15 season. The Knicks were 10–36 at the time for Whitted's firing, which was second worst in the Development League. Whitted became the first head coach to be fired in franchise history.

=== 2015–16 season ===
On October 7, 2015, the Westchester Knicks hired Mike Miller to be their head coach. Previously he served as an assistant coach for the Austin Toros. On October 27, 2015, the Westchester Knicks hired Coby Karl and Derrick Alston as the assistant basketball coaches. On October 31, 2015, with the second pick in the NBA D-League draft, The Westchester Knicks drafted Jimmer Fredette.

=== 2021–2023 seasons ===
Due to Westchester County Center being used as a makeshift hospital and later vaccination site during the COVID-19 Pandemic, the Knicks played their home games at Total Mortgage Arena in Bridgeport, Connecticut for the 2021-22 and 2022-23 seasons. The Knicks would return to White Plains starting from the 2023-24 season.

== Call-ups ==
All NBA D-League prospects — players whose rights are not owned by NBA teams — are free agents and are eligible to be called up to the NBA.

=== 2014–15 ===
- Guard Langston Galloway received a 10-day contract with the New York Knicks on January 7, 2015.

=== 2015–16 ===
- Forward Thanasis Antetokounmpo received a 10-day contract with the New York Knicks on January 29, 2016.
- Guard Jimmer Fredette received a 10-day contract with the New York Knicks on February 22, 2016.

=== 2016–17 ===
- Guard Chasson Randle received a 10-day contract with the Philadelphia 76ers on January 10, 2017.

=== 2017–18 ===
- Guard Trey Burke signed for the remainder of the season with the New York Knicks on January 14, 2018.
- Forward Nigel Hayes received a 10-day contract with the Los Angeles Lakers on January 19, 2018.

== Season-by-season ==
Season	Division	Regular season				Postseason results
Season	Division	Finish	Wins	Losses	Pct.	Postseason results
Westchester Knicks
2014–15	Atlantic	5th	10	40	.200	
2015–16	Atlantic	2nd	28	22	.560	Lost First Round (Sioux Falls) 0–2
2016–17	Atlantic	3rd	19	31	.380	
2017–18	Atlantic	1st	32	18	.640	Lost Conf. Semifinal (Raptors) 80–92
2018–19	Atlantic	2nd	29	21	.580	Won First Round (Windy City) 95–82; Lost Conf. Semifinal (Lakeland) 91–104
2019–20	Atlantic	5th	17	24	.415	Season cancelled by COVID-19 pandemic
2020–21	—	11th	7	8	.467	
2021–22	Eastern	8th	17	15	.531	
2022-23	Eastern	15th	9	23	.281	
2023-24	Eastern	15th	12	22	.353	
2024-25	Eastern	2nd	22	12	.647	Lost Conf. Semifinal (Maine) 118–124
2025-26	Eastern	14th	14	22	.389	
Regular season record			216	258	.456	
Playoff record			1	5	.167	

== Current roster ==
Westchester Knicks roster
Players

Pos.	No.	Player	Height	Weight	DOB	From
C	6	Ibrahima Diallo	7 ft 0 in (2.13 m)	245 lb (111 kg)	1999-03-08	Central Florida
F	91	Nick Jourdain	6 ft 9 in (2.06 m)	220 lb (100 kg)	2001-06-29	Memphis
F	44	Igor Miličić Jr.	6 ft 10 in (2.08 m)	225 lb (102 kg)	2002-08-27	Tennessee
G/F	35	Manny Obaseki	6 ft 4 in (1.93 m)	200 lb (91 kg)	2002-09-05	Texas A&M
G	0	Paul Zilinskas	6 ft 5 in (1.96 m)	205 lb (93 kg)	2001-08-15	IUPUI

Coaches
Head coach
- DeSagana Diop
Assistant(s)
- Allen Deep
- Lisa Willis

Legend
- (DP) Unsigned draft pick
- (FA) Free agent
- (S) Suspended
- (P) Prospects
- (NBA) On assignment from NBA affiliate
- (TW) Two-way affiliate player
- Injured

Roster
Updated: March 30, 2026

== Head coaches ==
#	Head coach	Term	Regular season				Playoffs				Achievements
#	Head coach	Term	G	W	L	Win%	G	W	L	Win%	Achievements
1	Kevin Whitted	2014–2015	50	10	40	.200	—	—	—	—	
2	Mike Miller	2015–2019	200	108	92	.540	4	1	3	.250	
3	Derrick Alston	2019–2022	88	41	47	.466	—	—	—	—	
4	DeSagana Diop	2022–present	136	57	79	.419	1	0	1	.000	

== NBA affiliates ==
- New York Knicks (2014–present)
