= Kevin Whitted =

American basketball player and coach

Personal information
- Born: Wilmington, North Carolina
- Listed height: 6 ft 10 in (2.08 m)

Career information
- High school: Emsley A. Laney (Wilmington, North Carolina)
- College: Tennessee (1992–1995)
- NBA draft: 1995: undrafted
- Playing career: 1995–1999
- Position: Forward

Career history

Coaching
- 2005–2007: Atlanta Vision
- 2007–2008: Wilmington Sea Dawgs
- 2008–2009: Fort Wayne Mad Ants (asst.)
- 2009–2011: Springfield Armor (asst.)
- 2012–2014: Southwest Tennessee Community College
- 2014–2015: Westchester Knicks

Kevin Whitted is a retired American basketball player and coach. He played in Europe after a successful career at University of Tennessee. He attended the same High School as Michael Jordan at Wilmington Laney High School. The school retired his Jersey and can be found right beside Michael's jersey in the schools Gymnasium.

== Coaching career ==
During the 2007–08 Premier Basketball League season Whitted coached the Wilmington Sea Dawgs. They played in the East Division. They finished the regular season at 11–9 and tied for second in the division with the Reading Railers behind the Rochester Razorsharks. They made the playoffs and faced the Maryland Nighthawks in the first round but lost. On April 22, 2008, Kevin Whitted resigned as head coach of the Sea Dawgs On October 17, Dale Kuhl was named head coach.

== NBA D League ==
On July 29, 2009, Whitted was named an assistant coach for the Springfield Armor.

On October 22, 2012, Whitted was named interim coach for Southwest Tennessee Community College.

On October 13, 2014, Kevin Whitted was named as the first coach of the Westchester Knicks. On March 30, 2015, the Knicks announced via Twitter that head coach Kevin Whitted was relieved of his duties and that assistant coach Craig Hodges would serve as the interim head coach for the final week of the 2014–15 season.
