= Leron =

Leron is a given name. Notable persons with the name include:

- Leron Black (born 1996), American basketball player
- Leron Lee (born 1948), American baseball player
- Leron Mitchell (born 1981), Canadian football player
- Leron Thomas (born 1979), American musician
