= Cary Koch =

American gridiron football player (born 1986)

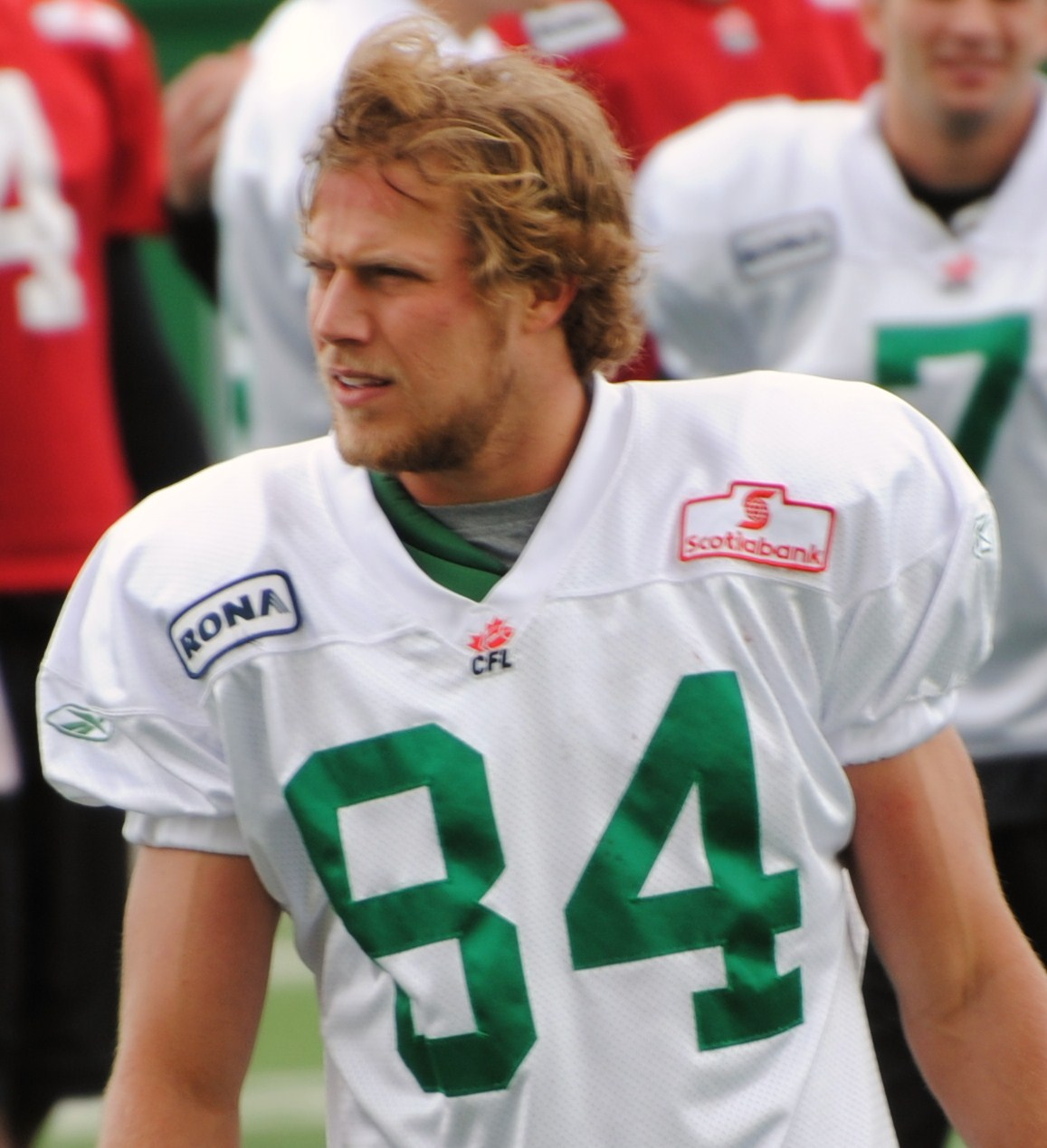

No. 84
- Position: Wide receiver

Personal information
- Born: August 28, 1986 (age 40); Baton Rouge, Louisiana
- Listed height: 6 ft 0 in (1.83 m)
- Listed weight: 200 lb (91 kg)

Career information
- High school: Dunham
- College: Virginia

Career history
- 2010–2011: Saskatchewan Roughriders
- 2012–2013: Edmonton Eskimos
- 2014: Hamilton Tiger-Cats
- Stats at CFL.ca

Cary Koch (born August 28, 1986) is an American former professional football wide receiver. Koch played college football for the University of Virginia after transferring from Tulane University in the aftermath of Hurricane Katrina.

== Professional career ==
=== Saskatchewan Roughriders ===
After exhausting his collegiate eligibility, Koch signed with the Saskatchewan Roughriders as a free agent in April, 2010. He was on the team's practice roster until Prechae Rodriguez was released, clearing a spot for him on the active roster. Koch made his debut with the Roughriders in week 12 of the season against the Calgary Stampeders. He caught two passes for 15 yards and was on the receiving end of a successful two-point conversion.

=== Edmonton Eskimos ===
Koch signed as a free agent with the Edmonton Eskimos on the first day of free agency on February 15, 2012.

=== Hamilton Tiger-Cats ===
Koch signed as a free agent with the Hamilton Tiger-Cats on the first day of free agency on February 11, 2014. He was released by the Tiger Cats on May 1, 2015

== Career statistics ==
Receiving		Regular season						Playoffs
Year	Team	Games	No.	Yards	Avg	Long	TD	Games	No.	Yards	Avg	Long	TD
2010	SSK	8	21	299	14.2	42	3	3	11	123	11.2	40	1
2011	SSK	9	11	101	9.2	17	0
CFL totals		17	32	400	12.5	42	3	3	11	123	11.2	40	1
