= 2014 NBA Development League expansion draft =

General information
- Sport: Basketball
- Date(s): September 2, 2014
- Location: White Plains, New York

Overview
- League: NBA
- Expansion teams: Westchester Knicks

The 2014 NBA Development League expansion draft was the seventh expansion draft of the National Basketball Association Development League (D-League). The draft was held on September 2, 2014, so that the newly founded Westchester Knicks could acquire players for the upcoming 2014–15 season. The 16 players were chosen from a pool of unprotected players among the league's teams. Each returning D-League team could protect up to 12 of their players from being selected.

Two of the players that the Knicks chose had previously been named NBA D-League All-Stars: Jerome Jordan and DaJuan Summers. Three additional players had also been previously selected in an NBA draft: Craig Brackins (2010), Luke Harangody (2010), Kris Joseph (2012).

== Key ==
Pos.	G	F	C
Position	Guard	Forward	Center

^	Denotes player who has been selected to (an) NBA Development League All-Star Game(s)
*	Denotes player who has been selected to (an) NBA Development League All-Star Game(s) and was also selected in an NBA draft
†	Denotes player who was also selected in an NBA Draft

== Draft ==
Pick	Player	Pos.	Nationality	Team	College
1	Jeff Adrien	F	United States	Westchester Knicks	Connecticut
2	Craig Brackins^{†}	F	United States	Westchester Knicks	Iowa State
3	Austin Freeman	G	United States	Westchester Knicks	Georgetown
4	Kyle Gibson	G	United States	Westchester Knicks	Louisiana Tech
5	Stefhon Hannah	G	United States	Westchester Knicks	Missouri
6	Luke Harangody^{†}	F	United States	Westchester Knicks	Notre Dame
7	Jordan Henriquez	F	United States	Westchester Knicks	Kansas State
8	Richard Howell	F	United States	Westchester Knicks	NC State
9	Curtis Jerrells	G	United States	Westchester Knicks	Baylor
10	Jerome Jordan*	C	Jamaica	Westchester Knicks	Tulsa
11	Kris Joseph^{†}	F	Canada	Westchester Knicks	Syracuse
12	Brady Morningstar	G	United States	Westchester Knicks	Kansas
13	Josh Owens	F	United States	Westchester Knicks	Stanford
14	Anthony Richardson	F	United States	Westchester Knicks	Florida State
15	Ben Strong	C	United States	Westchester Knicks	Guilford
16	DaJuan Summers*	F	United States	Westchester Knicks	Georgetown
