= Marcus Adams (Canadian football) =

American gridiron football player (born 1979)

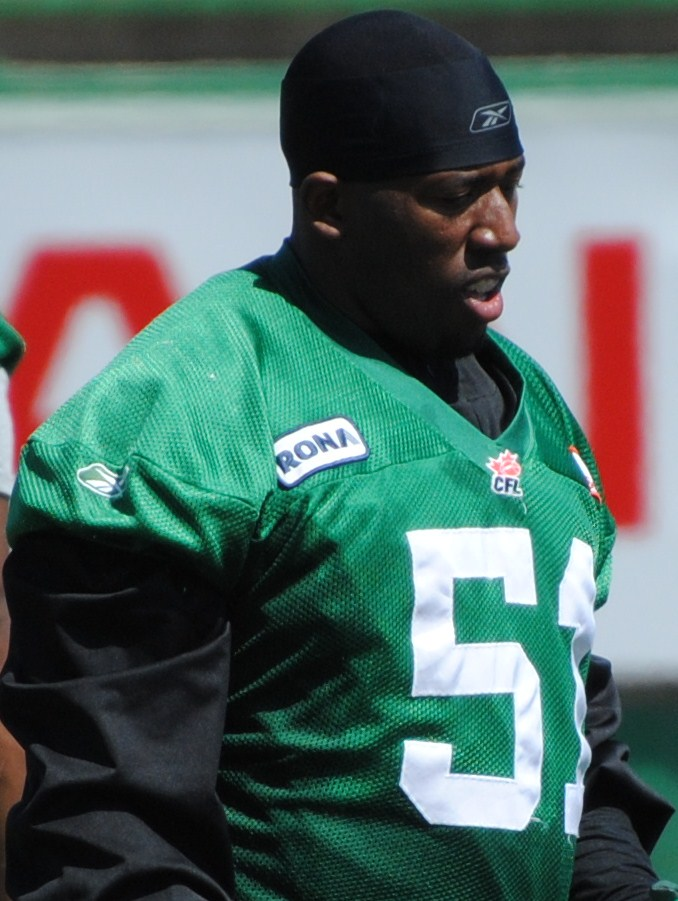
- Adams with the Saskatchewan Roughriders in 2010

No. 51
- Position: Defensive tackle

Personal information
- Born: July 20, 1979 (age 47); Indianapolis, Indiana, U.S.
- Listed height: 5 ft 10 in (1.78 m)
- Listed weight: 275 lb (125 kg)

Career information
- High school: Indianapolis (IN) Ben Davis
- College: Eastern Kentucky

Career history
- 2003–2010: Saskatchewan Roughriders
- 2004–2005: Colorado Crush
- 2005: Peoria Rough Riders
- 2011: Edmonton Eskimos*
- 2012: Spokane Shock*
- * Offseason or practice squad member only

Awards and highlights
- Grey Cup champion (2007)
- Stats at CFL.ca (archive)
- Stats at ArenaFan.com

Marcus "Chunky" Adams (born July 20, 1979) is an American former professional football player. A defensive tackle, he played for the Saskatchewan Roughriders of the Canadian Football League (CFL) for eight seasons. He also was on the rosters of the Edmonton Eskimos of the CFL, the Colorado Crush and Spokane Shock of the Arena Football League, and the Peoria Rough Riders of af2 throughout his professional career. He played college football at Eastern Kentucky.

Adams was a backup at various defensive line positions for four seasons before he was given the opportunity to consistently start for the Roughriders. He had a breakout season in 2007, when he made a career-high 35 tackles and six sacks on his way to winning his first and only Grey Cup championship. After eight seasons with the Roughriders, Adams was released and spent brief periods of time with the Edmonton Eskimos and Spokane Shock before retiring. He finished his career with 130 tackles and 12 sacks, appearing in eight playoff games and three Grey Cups.

== Early career ==
Adams played high school football for the Giants at Ben Davis High School, where he was an all-state defensive tackle and was named a top player by USA Today. The Evansville Courier & Press reported that Adams was both fast and strong for a high school tackle, with a 40-yard dash time of 4.9 seconds and the strength to bench press 350 pounds (160 kg).

Adams went on to play four seasons of college football with the Eastern Kentucky Colonels, a member of the Division I Football Championship Subdivision (then known as Division I-AA). Starting in 33 games, Adams received several accolades while playing for the Colonels, including being named a Division I-AA third team All-American, a two-time first team All-Conference player, and a second team All-Conference player. In September 2002, he was selected as the Ohio Valley Conference Defensive Player of the Week for his effort in a game against the Florida Atlantic Owls, where he made 5 total tackles and repeatedly pressured the quarterback (including for one sack). Adams continued his successful senior year by recording 81 defensive tackles and five sacks.

== Professional career ==
=== Saskatchewan Roughriders ===
On March 21, 2003, the Saskatchewan Roughriders announced that they signed Adams as a free agent. Adams went on to play eight seasons with the Roughriders.

==== 2003 season ====
Adams received an early opportunity to start for the Roughriders after Ray Jacobs was suspended for missing practice in the preseason. Adams made his CFL debut as a defensive end on June 19, 2003, against the Toronto Argonauts. He went on to play in nine regular season games and record 13 tackles in his rookie season, both due to Jacobs' continued suspension and injuries to other defensive linemen later in the season.

==== 2004 season ====
Adams remained with the Roughriders for the 2004 season, but he did not play in any regular season games.

==== 2005 season ====
Between the 2004 and 2005 seasons, Adams played indoor football with the Colorado Crush of the Arena Football League and the Peoria Rough Riders of af2. On May 9, 2005, Adams left the Peoria Rough Riders to attend training camp with the Saskatchewan Roughriders. He acted as a backup for the Roughriders throughout the 2005 season. In July, he started in place of Nate Davis, who was unable to play due to back spasms. Adams went on to play in only five regular season games, where he made two sacks and four tackles.

==== 2006 season ====
Adams was again used primarily as a backup in the 2006 season, playing in only five games. He played in place of Nate Davis and T. J. Stancil when both players dealt with injuries. In September, Adams was placed on the injured list. He finished the season with seven tackles and a sack.

==== 2007 season ====
After Nate Davis was released from the Roughriders in the offseason, Adams took over as a starting defensive tackle. By mid-July, Adams was leading the CFL with four sacks. While Adams was injured in November, he did not miss serious time, and he played a major role in the Roughriders' playoff run. In the Western final, Adams effectively ended a BC Lions drive late in the fourth quarter by sacking opposing quarterback Dave Dickenson for a 14-yard loss. The drive ended in a punt, and the Roughriders went on to win 26–17 to move on to the Grey Cup. The Saskatchewan Roughriders won the 95th Grey Cup, defeating the Winnipeg Blue Bombers 23–19. In the championship game, Adams was part of a defense that was described as "domineering" by The Gazette. He finished the season with 35 tackles, six sacks, and one pass deflection in 16 regular season games, all of which were career highs.

==== 2008 season ====
Adams faced the possibility of becoming a free agent after the 2007 season, but he re-signed with the Roughriders by February 2008. Adams was challenged by Brent Curvey and Ronald Flemons in training camp, but he won the starting role for the 2008 season. Playing in 14 games, he made 11 tackles and two fumble recoveries. Adams missed a regular season game in July to visit his mother, who was undergoing cancer surgery, and he also spent time on the injured list due to a finger injury and sprained ankle. The Roughriders made the playoffs, but lost to the BC Lions 33–12 in the West Semi-Final.

==== 2009 season ====
Adams continued to start in the 2009 season, and he recorded 33 tackles, a sack, and a pass deflection while playing in all 18 regular season games. The Roughriders made it to the 97th Grey Cup, where Adams forced a fumble that was recovered by teammate Keith Shologan. Facing the Montreal Alouettes, the Roughriders lost 28–27, preventing Adams from winning his second championship.

==== 2010 season ====
Adams again became a free agent before the 2010 season, but he re-signed with the Roughriders. He continued to regularly start and be featured in the rotation at the defensive lineman position. Adams missed Week 13 due to an injury. He finished the season with 27 tackles, two sacks, and a fumble recovery across 16 regular season games. The Roughriders again made it to the Grey Cup, but they lost to the Alouettes 21–18.

=== Retirement ===
Following the 2010 season, the Roughriders chose not to re-sign Adams. The Edmonton Eskimos expressed interest, and Adams signed a contract with them for the 2011 season. He never played a regular season game for the Eskimos, and was eventually released. Adams later returned to the Arena Football League and signed with the Spokane Shock in 2012 before retiring from professional football.

=== Season statistics ===
Year	Team	GP	Tackles	Sacks	Pass deflections	Forced fumbles	Fumble recoveries
2003	SAS	9	13	0	1	1	0
2005	SAS	5	4	2	0	0	0
2006	SAS	5	7	1	0	0	0
2007	SAS	16	35	6	1	0	0
2008	SAS	14	11	0	0	0	2
2009	SAS	18	33	1	1	0	0
2010	SAS	16	27	2	0	0	1
Total		83	130	12	3	1	3

== Personal life ==
Marcus was born to a family of athletes, with his father and uncles boxing professionally.

Adams was active in the Saskatchewan community throughout his time with the Roughriders. In March 2008, he helped coach a pee wee hockey team during a charity benefit for Dustin Lemire, a child diagnosed with leukemia. Adams also coached that year in a high school training camp hosted by Matt Dominguez, a fellow Roughrider, and in a skills camp for the Ehrlo Monday Night Football League.

Marcus is now a defensive line coach at Bowdoin College.
