= Emsley A. Laney High School =

American public school in North Carolina

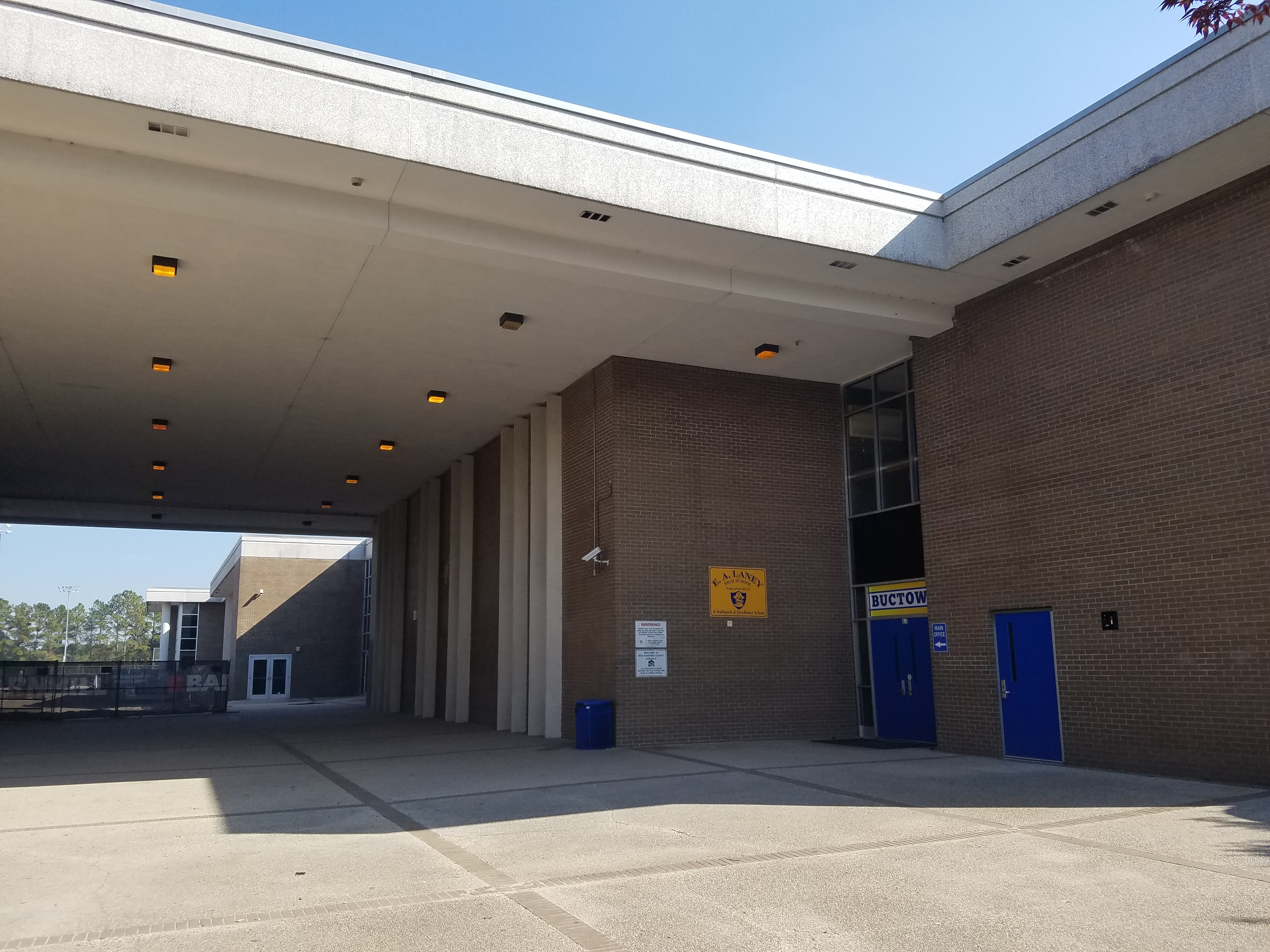
- Emsley A. Laney High School, November 2016

Location
- 2700 N College Rd; Wilmington, North Carolina 28405; United States; 34°17′51″N 77°52′22″W

Information
- Type: Public high school secondary school
- Motto: Our Treasure is Knowledge
- Established: 1976 (50 years ago)
- School district: New Hanover County Schools
- Superintendent: Charles Foust
- CEEB code: 344349
- Principal: Danny Little
- Teaching staff: 110.86 (FTE)
- Grades: 9-12
- Gender: Co-educational
- Enrollment: 2,243 (2024–2025)
- Student to teacher ratio: 20.23
- Campus: Suburban
- Campus size: 26.477 acres
- Colors: Blue and gold
- Athletics: NCHSAA 8A
- Athletics conference: Carolina Coast 6A/7A/8A
- Sports: basketball, baseball, cross country, cheerleading, football, golf, lacrosse, swimming, softball, soccer, tennis, track & field, volleyball, wrestling
- Mascot: Buccaneer
- Nickname: Buccaneers
- Website: laney.nhcs.net

Emsley A. Laney High School (commonly known as Laney High School) is a four-year public high school in Wilmington, North Carolina, United States. It is a part of New Hanover County Schools. The school’s most notable alumnus is Michael Jordan.

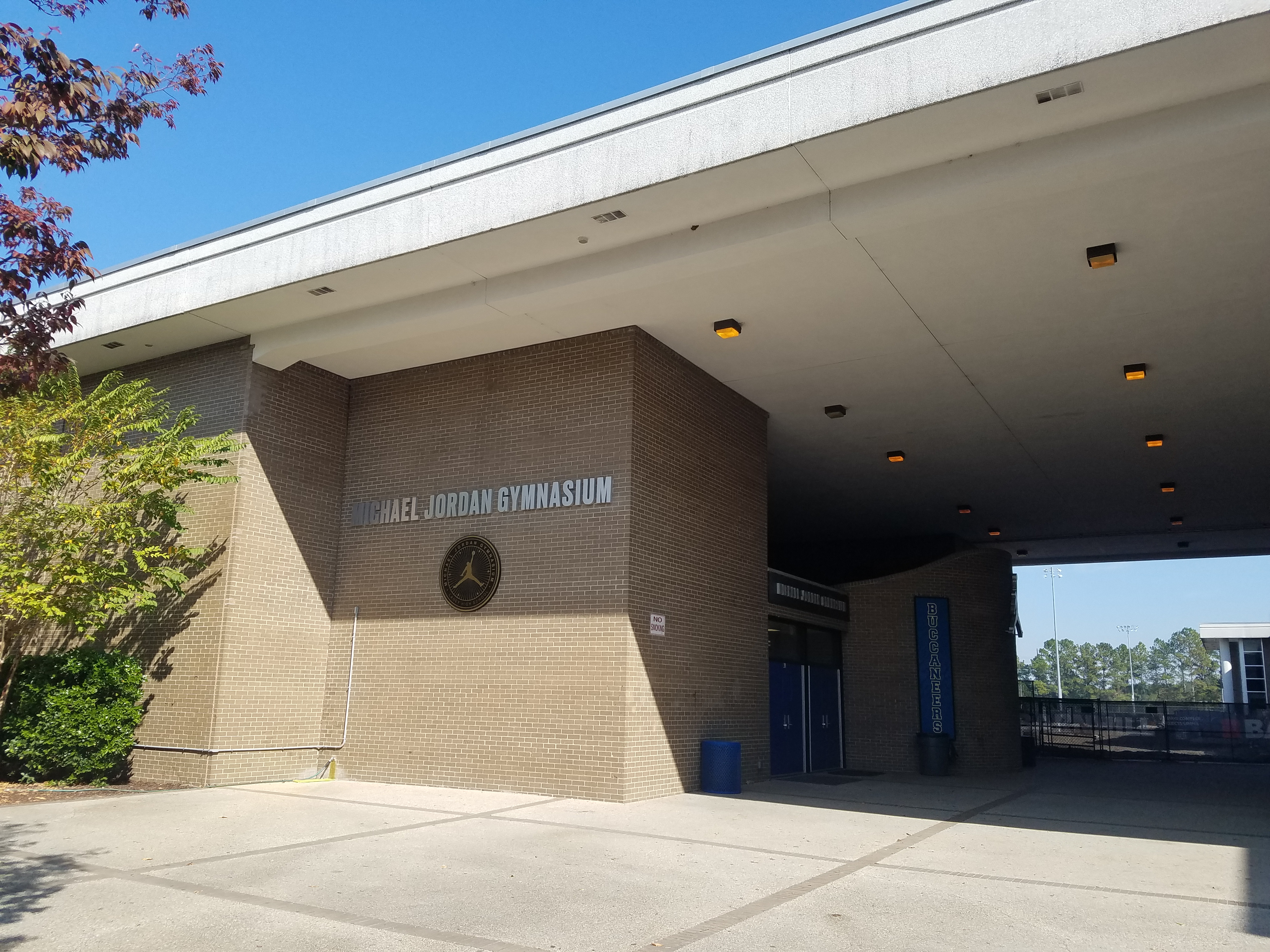
The Michael Jordan Gymnasium at Laney

== History ==
Emsley A. Laney High School opened in 1976. The school was named after Emsley Armfield Laney (1904–1999), a business and community leader for several decades in Wilmington. He was a member of the school board for over 30 years, serving as chairman during part of that time.

== Notable alumni ==
- Kadeem Allen, professional basketball player for Juvi Cremona in the Serie A2
- David Bostian, professional wrestler signed to WWE under ring name Myles Borne
- Arnold Brown, former NFL defensive back
- Dondi E. Costin, major general in the United States Air Force
- Jeff Ferrell, former MLB pitcher
- Kitwana Jones, former linebacker in the Canadian Football League
- Larry Jordan, former professional basketball player and basketball executive, Michael Jordan’s brother
- Michael Jordan, NBA player, businessman and member of the Basketball Hall of Fame
- Greg Lindquist, New York-based artist
- Leroy Smith, professional basketball player
- Lara Trump, television producer and campaign adviser to her father-in-law Donald Trump
- Kevin Whitted, professional basketball player and coach
- Tamera Young, WNBA player
