= Jeremy Gilchrist =

American gridiron football player (born 1986)

Profile
- Position: Wide receiver

Personal information
- Born: February 24, 1986 (age 40); Norfolk, Virginia, U.S.
- Listed height: 5 ft 10 in (1.78 m)
- Listed weight: 174 lb (79 kg)

Career information
- College: Hampton
- NFL draft: 2009: undrafted

Career history
- 2009–2010: Saskatchewan Roughriders
- Stats at CFL.ca (archive)

Jeremy Gilchrist (born February 24, 1986) is an American former professional American and Canadian football wide receiver. He played college football for the Hampton Pirates.
