= Maurice Lloyd =

American gridiron football player (born 1983)

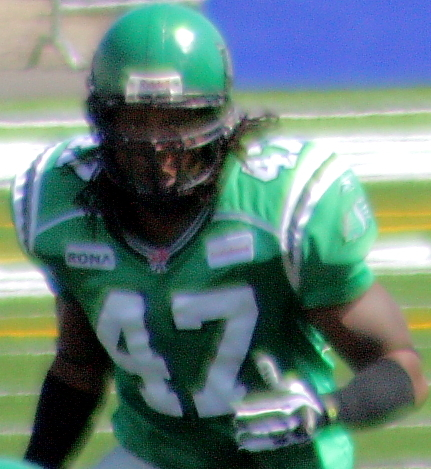
- Lloyd with the Saskatchewan Roughriders in 2007

No. 47
- Position: Linebacker

Personal information
- Born: February 15, 1983 (age 43); Daytona Beach, Florida, U.S.
- Listed height: 5 ft 11 in (1.80 m)
- Listed weight: 235 lb (107 kg)

Career information
- High school: Mainland (Daytona Beach, Florida)
- College: UConn

Career history
- 2006–2008: Saskatchewan Roughriders
- 2009–2010: Edmonton Eskimos
- 2012: Saskatchewan Roughriders*
- * Offseason or practice squad member only

Awards and highlights
- Grey Cup champion (2007); CFL All-Star (2008); 2× CFL West All-Star (2007, 2008)
- Stats at CFL.ca

Maurice Lloyd (February 15, 1983) is an American former professional football linebacker who played for the Saskatchewan Roughriders and Edmonton Eskimos of the Canadian Football League (CFL). After spending three seasons with the Roughriders, he signed with the Eskimos and spent two seasons with that team. He sat out the 2011 season before re-signing with Saskatchewan. He played college football at UConn.

== College career ==
Lloyd attended the University of Connecticut under coach Randy Edsall. He started at the middle linebacker for the Huskies all four seasons, from 2001 to 2004 and was able to record 18 solo tackles his Sophomore year. His junior year, he led his team in tackles with 122 and he finished his senior year with 117 tackles, 12 tackles for losses, three quarterback sacks, and an interception.

== Professional career ==
=== Saskatchewan Roughriders (first stint) ===
In May 2006, Lloyd was signed as a free agent by the Saskatchewan Roughriders. He started in six regular season games and both playoff games at middle linebacker, making his CFL debut in week 13.

In 2007, Lloyd started 16 regular season games, both playoff games, and the 95th Grey Cup game, missing two regular season games due to injury. Lloyd finished the regular season with 69 defensive tackles, four special teams tackles, three quarterback sacks and two interceptions. He was named a West Division All Star for the year.

On September 4, 2008 Lloyd was named the CFL's defensive player of the month and later became a 2008 CFL All-Star.

=== Edmonton Eskimos ===
Lloyd signed with the Edmonton Eskimos on February 16, 2009. After two seasons with the Eskimos, Lloyd was released on March 14, 2011. He was not picked up by a CFL team during the 2011 season.

=== Saskatchewan Roughriders (second stint) ===
Lloyd re-signed with the Roughriders on December 6, 2011 after the team released incumbent starting middle linebacker Barrin Simpson. He was released before training camp on May 11, 2012.

== Personal life ==
Lloyd spends his off-season as a high school behavioral specialist in Connecticut. He likes to spend time with his three children and wife. He also has a passion for flipping houses and investing in real estate. He now is actively pursuing his real estate investing goals by buying and rehabbing houses in Connecticut as part of the We Buy Houses team
