= Rob Lazeo =

Canadian gridiron football player (born 1973)

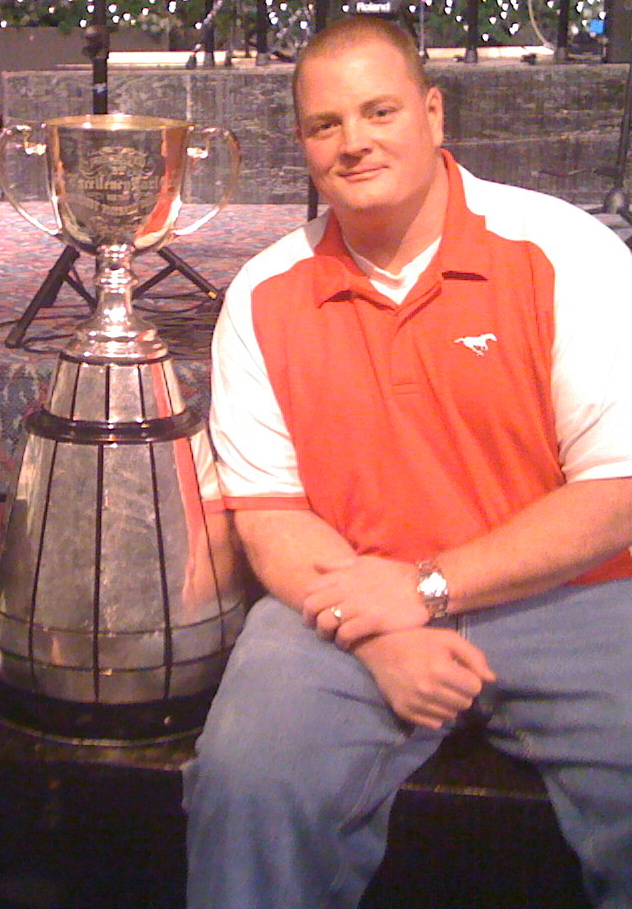
- Lazeo with the Grey Cup in 2008

No. 68
- Positions: Guard, Center

Personal information
- Born: March 23, 1973 (age 53); Abbotsford, British Columbia, Canada
- Listed height: 6 ft 5 in (1.96 m)
- Listed weight: 310 lb (141 kg)

Career information
- College: Western Illinois

Career history
- 1997–1998: Saskatchewan Roughriders
- 2000–2001: Winnipeg Blue Bombers
- 2002–2006: Saskatchewan Roughriders
- 2007–2010: Calgary Stampeders

Awards and highlights
- Grey Cup champion (2008); CFL West All-Star (2008)
- Stats at CFL.ca

Robert Lazeo (born March 23, 1973) is a Canadian former professional football offensive lineman who played 14 seasons in the Canadian Football League (CFL). He spent the last four years of his career with the Calgary Stampeders where he won the 96th Grey Cup in the Stampeders' 2008 season. He also played for the Saskatchewan Roughriders and the Winnipeg Blue Bombers.
