= Jean-François Morin-Roberge =

Canadian football player (born 1984)

Profile
- Position: Offensive lineman

Personal information
- Born: January 9, 1984 (age 42); Quebec City, Quebec
- Listed height: 6 ft 6 in (1.98 m)
- Listed weight: 325 lb (147 kg)

Career information
- University: Montreal
- CFL draft: 2008: 4th round, 30th overall pick

Career history
- Saskatchewan Roughriders (2008)*; Winnipeg Blue Bombers (2009)*; Toronto Argonauts (2009)*
- * Offseason or practice squad member only
- Stats at CFL.ca (archive)

Jean-François Morin-Roberge (born January 9, 1984) is a former offensive lineman who played in the Canadian Football League. He was drafted by the Saskatchewan Roughriders in the fourth round of the 2008 CFL draft. He played CIS Football at Montreal.

Morin-Roberge also with the Winnipeg Blue Bombers for their 2009 pre-season training camp, but was cut by the team at the camp's conclusion. On October 19, 2009, Morin-Roberge was signed by the Toronto Argonauts to practice roster agreement. He was released by the Argonauts on November 8, 2009, but was re-signed by the team on January 15, 2010. On April 19, 2010, Morin-Roberge retired from football.

In 2012, it was reported that Jean-François Morin-Roberge was tied for the longest name in Roughriders' history with 2000 practice roster quarterback Terrance J. Williams Bennett.
