= Anton McKenzie =

American gridiron football player (born 1981)

No. 42
- Position: Linebacker

Personal information
- Born: January 4, 1981 (age 45); Stony Brook, New York, U.S.
- Listed height: 5 ft 11 in (1.80 m)
- Listed weight: 228 lb (103 kg)

Career information
- College: Massachusetts

Career history
- 2006–2008: Saskatchewan Roughriders
- 2009–2013: BC Lions
- 2014: Ottawa Redblacks

Awards and highlights
- 2× Grey Cup champion (2007, 2011); CFL All-Star (2008); 2× CFL West All-Star (2008, 2009)
- Stats at CFL.ca (archive)

Anton McKenzie (born January 4, 1981) is an American former professional football linebacker who played in the Canadian Football League (CFL). He played three seasons with the Saskatchewan Roughriders before playing five seasons with the BC Lions of the CFL. He played college football at Massachusetts.
