= Cole Bergquist =

American gridiron football quarterback (born 1985)

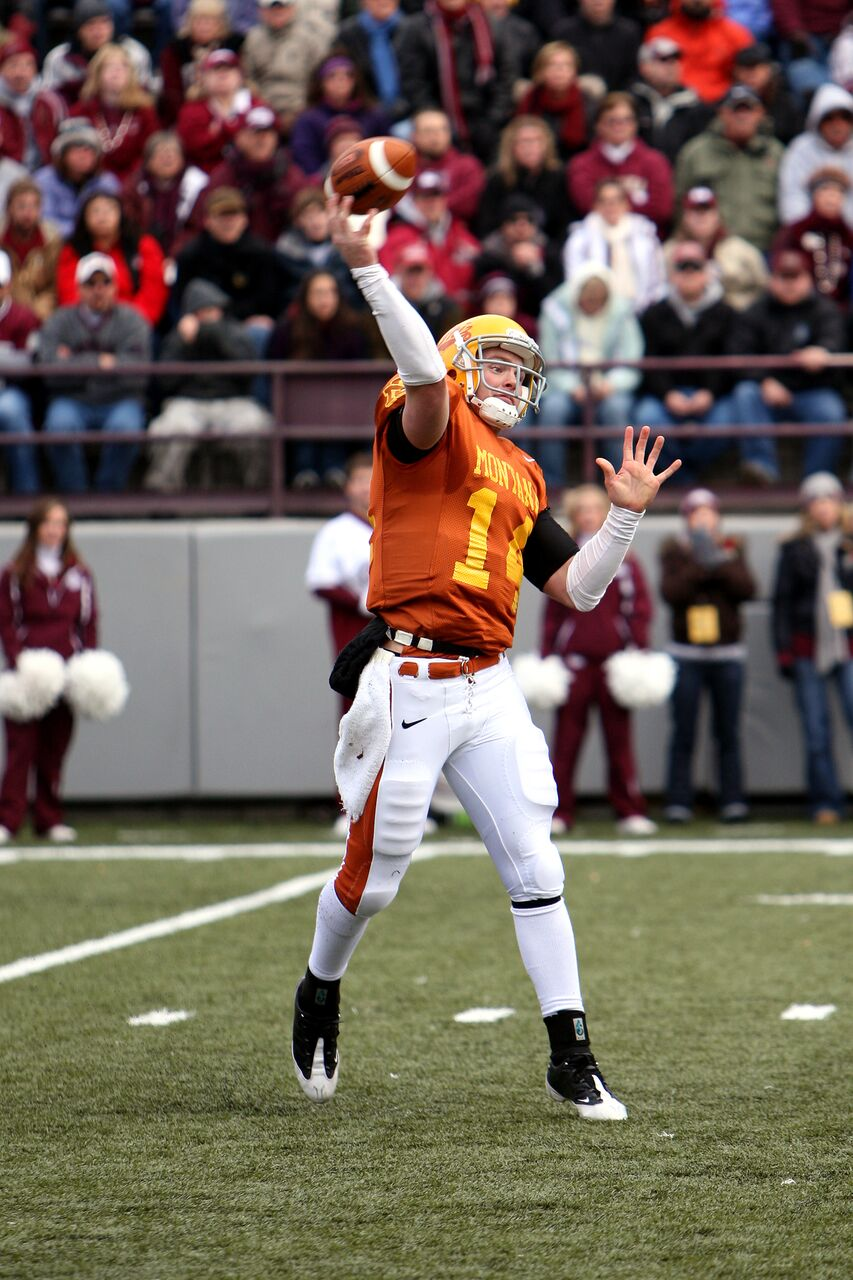

No. 17
- Position: Quarterback

Personal information
- Born: November 16, 1985 (age 40); San Clemente, California, U.S.
- Listed height: 6 ft 2 in (1.88 m)
- Listed weight: 215 lb (98 kg)

Career information
- College: Montana (2004–2008)
- NFL draft: 2009: undrafted

Career history
- 2009–2011: Saskatchewan Roughriders
- Stats at CFL.ca (archive)

Cole Bergquist (born November 16, 1985) is an American former professional football quarterback who played for the Saskatchewan Roughriders of the Canadian Football League (CFL). He played college football at the University of Montana.

== Early life ==
Bergquist attended San Clemente High School where he played baseball, basketball and football. His senior year, he led the SCHS football team to a 10–3 record and the CIF semi-final game. He was selected as first team all league in football. Bergquist was awarded by the National Honors Society as a top Scholar-Athlete in the state of California.

== College career ==
Bergquist had a stellar career for the Montana Grizzlies. He led the team to a 35–6 record and a national championship game during his 4-year tenure as the starting quarterback. Over his career, Bergquist accounted for 9,113 yards and 71 touchdowns. His best game came against Sacramento State in 2004, he completed 17 of 19 passes for 291 yards 4 TD and O INT, and also rushed for 1 TD. He was selected to the Big Sky All-Conference team his junior and senior year. He set numerous school records including highest completion percentage in a game 13 of 13 (100%). His senior year he was awarded the "Scholar-Athlete of The Year" award for the University of Montana.

== Professional career ==
After going undrafted in the 2009 NFL draft, Bergquist attended rookie minicamp on a tryout basis with the San Diego Chargers.

Bergquist's CFL rights were originally owned by the BC Lions, but were traded to the Saskatchewan Roughriders. He officially signed with the Roughriders on July 6, 2009. He did not dress for any games during the 2009 season. Bergquist dressed in all 36 regular season games from 2010 to 2011, only attempting six total passes. Saskatchewan played in the Grey Cup in 2009 and 2010 losing both times to the Montreal Alouettes. After a disappointing season in 2011 the Roughriders coaching staff was released. The incoming coaching staff released Bergquist during the off-season before the start of the 2012 season.

== Real estate ==
In his first five years as a real estate broker, Bergquist sold 255 properties making him one of the top agents in the state of Montana. According to Real Trends in 2016, he was rated as the number one agent in the Montana Regional MLS in terms of total production, with sales totaling over $37 million. That year, Bergquist sold "The Indian Prairie Ranch" in Victor, Montana at $9.5 million.

On Jan 8, 2020 Missoula City Council approved a request from Bergquist, in a 9-to-0 vote to rezone a portion of South Fourth Street East and Ronald Avenue, along with a vacation of the rights of way, to make way for a four-story, 48-unit upscale condo building, 8 of the 48 units were deed-restricted affordable housing units. The project sold out prior to breaking ground on construction.

In November 2021, Bergquist entered into an agreement to purchase the former site of The Missoulian Newspaper building, a 3.5-acre parcel, which is located on the Clark Fork River, across from downtown Missoula and near Bergquist's previous condo project, The Reed, which is also under construction. Bergquist announced that their plans for the developments will include, housing, retail shops, restaurants, open space, and substantial parking, with a zoning variance which will allow a building up to 125 feet high.
