= Aaron Fairooz =

American gridiron football player (born 1983)

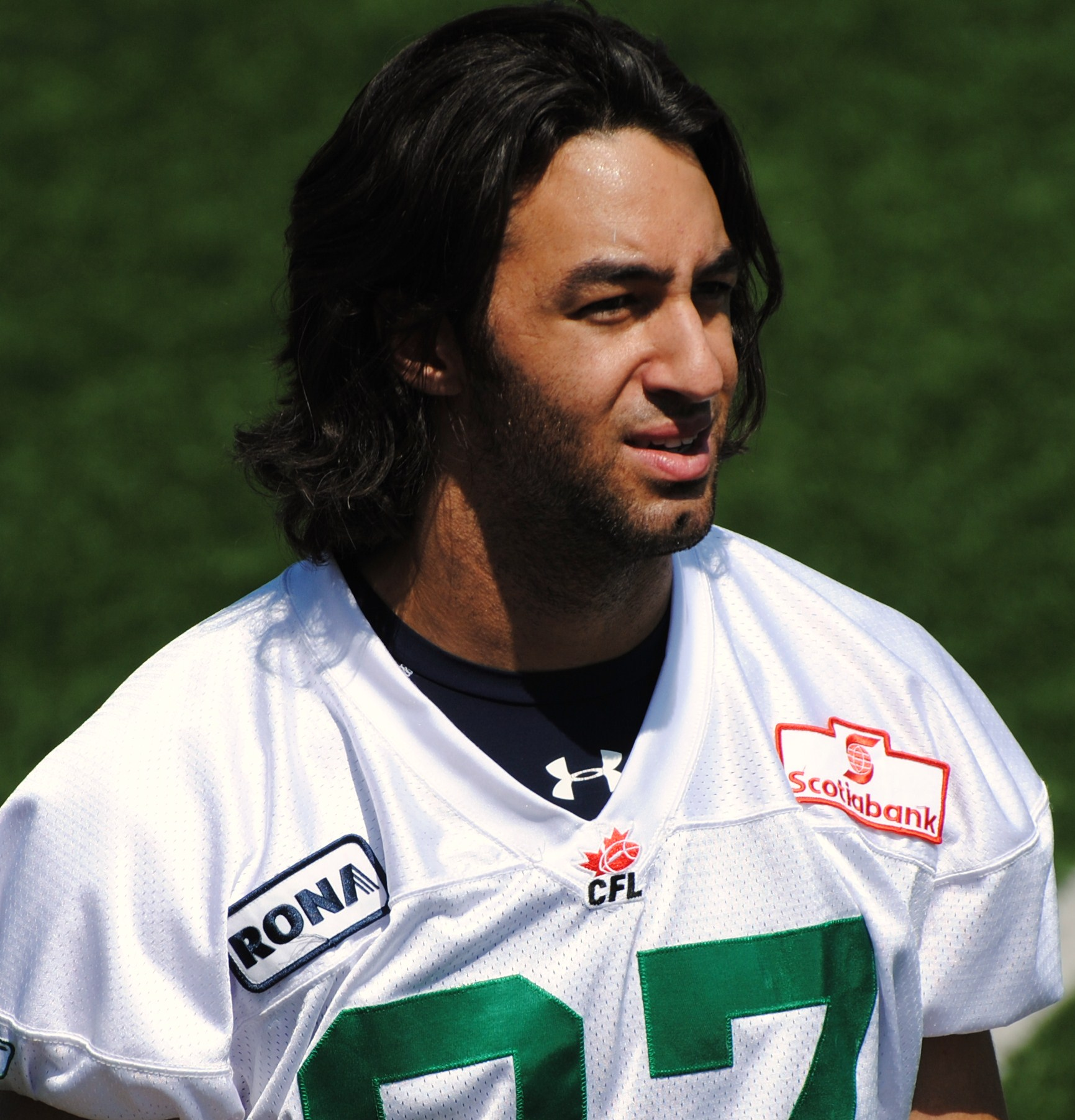

Profile
- Position: Wide receiver

Personal information
- Born: November 10, 1983 (age 42); Arlington, Texas, U.S.
- Listed height: 6 ft 6 in (1.98 m)
- Listed weight: 210 lb (95 kg)

Career information
- College: Central Arkansas
- NFL draft: 2007: undrafted

Career history
- Winnipeg Blue Bombers (2008)*; Arkansas Twisters (2009); Hamilton Tiger-Cats (2009)*; Dallas Vigilantes (2010)*; Spokane Shock (2010)*; Saskatchewan Roughriders (2010–2011)*; Spokane Shock (2012)*
- * Offseason or practice squad member only
- Stats at ArenaFan.com

Aaron Fairooz (born November 10, 1983) is an American former professional football wide receiver. Fairooz signed as a free agent on March 19, 2010, with the Saskatchewan Roughriders. He was released by the Riders on September 6, 2011.
