= Byron Bullock =

American gridiron football player (born 1987)

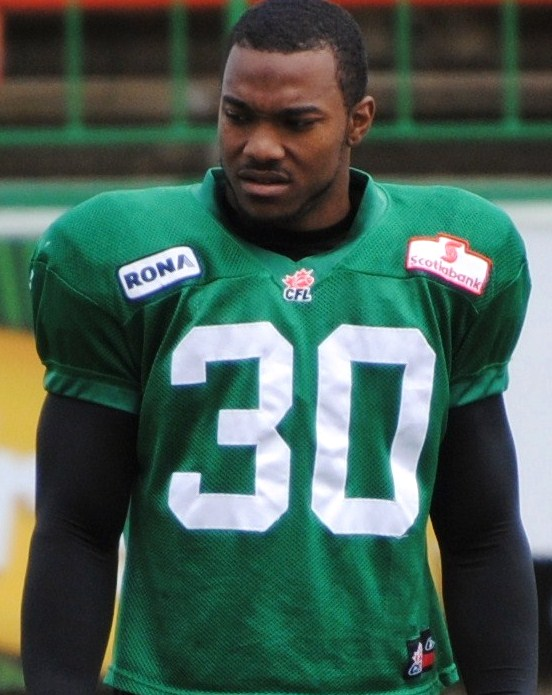
- Bullock with the Saskatchewan Roughriders in 2010

No. 30, 33
- Position: Linebacker

Personal information
- Born: March 4, 1987 (age 39); Inglewood, California, U.S.
- Listed height: 6 ft 1 in (1.85 m)
- Listed weight: 220 lb (100 kg)

Career information
- College: South Dakota
- NFL draft: 2010: undrafted

Career history
- 2010: Saskatchewan Roughriders
- 2011–2012: Hamilton Tiger-Cats
- Stats at CFL.ca (archive)

Byron Bullock (born March 4, 1987) is a former professional Canadian football linebacker.

Bullock re-signed with the Hamilton Tiger-Cats on April 10, 2012, after joining the team's practice roster late in the 2011 season. He was previously a member of the Saskatchewan Roughriders in 2010. Byron Bullock played college football for the University of South Dakota Coyotes.
