= Ludovic Kashindi =

Canadian football player (born 1984)

No. 14
- Position: Defensive back

Personal information
- Born: June 6, 1984 (age 42); Paris, France
- Listed height: 6 ft 0 in (1.83 m)
- Listed weight: 190 lb (86 kg)

Career information
- University: Sherbrooke

Career history
- 2010: Hamilton Tiger-Cats*
- 2010–2011: Saskatchewan Roughriders*
- 2011: Edmonton Eskimos
- * Offseason or practice squad member only

Ludovic Kashindi (born June 6, 1984, in Paris, France) is a former professional Canadian football defensive back. He was originally signed by the Hamilton Tiger-Cats in September 2010, before being signed to a practice roster agreement with the Saskatchewan Roughriders in October of that year. He played CIS football for the Sherbrooke Vert et Or.
