= Tamon George =

Canadian football player (born 1987)

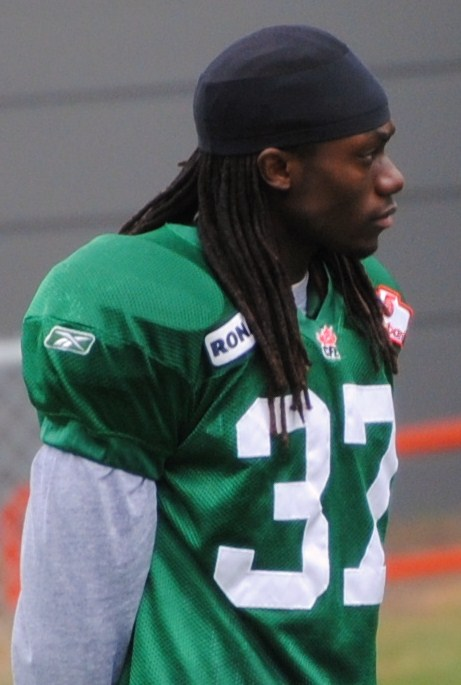

Profile
- Position: Defensive back

Personal information
- Born: November 21, 1987 (age 38); Regina, Saskatchewan, Canada
- Listed height: 6 ft 0 in (1.83 m)
- Listed weight: 182 lb (83 kg)

Career information
- University: Regina
- CFL draft: 2009: 2nd round, 9th overall pick

Career history
- 2009–2011: Saskatchewan Roughriders
- Stats at CFL.ca (archive)

Tamon George (born November 21, 1987) is a Canadian former professional football defensive back who played for the Saskatchewan Roughriders of the Canadian Football League (CFL). He was drafted by the Roughriders in the second round of the 2009 CFL draft and signed with the team May 26, 2009. He played CIS football for the Regina Rams.
