= Lavarus Giles =

American gridiron football player (born 1986)

Profile
- Position: Running back

Personal information
- Born: February 15, 1986 (age 40); Benoit, Mississippi, U.S.
- Listed height: 6 ft 2 in (1.88 m)
- Listed weight: 215 lb (98 kg)

Career information
- College: Jackson State University
- NFL draft: 2008: undrafted

Career history
- Jacksonville Jaguars (2008)*; St. Louis Rams (2008)*; Calgary Stampeders (2008)*; New Orleans Saints (2008)*; Winnipeg Blue Bombers (2009); Saskatchewan Roughriders (2010)*
- * Offseason or practice squad member only

Awards and highlights
- Grey Cup champion (2008)
- Stats at CFL.ca

Lavarus Lakeith Giles (born February 15, 1986) is an American former professional football running back who played for the Winnipeg Blue Bombers of the Canadian Football League (CFL). He was signed by the Jacksonville Jaguars as an undrafted free agent in 2008. He played college football at Jackson State.

Giles was also a member of the St. Louis Rams, Calgary Stampeders, New Orleans Saints, and Saskatchewan Roughriders.

As of 2025, Giles is a Police Officer with the Evansville Police Department.

== Early life ==
Giles ran track at Ray Brooks High School, finishing 1st in the state in the 100 meter dash and 2nd in the 200-meter dash. He also played basketball where he led his team to a state championship.
