= Carlos Armour =

American gridiron football player (born 1986)

Profile
- Position: Linebacker

Personal information
- Born: January 31, 1986 (age 40); Memphis, Tennessee, U.S.
- Listed height: 6 ft 3 in (1.91 m)
- Listed weight: 210 lb (95 kg)

Career information
- College: Miami (FL)
- NFL draft: 2009: undrafted

Career history
- 2009–2010: Saskatchewan Roughriders
- Stats at CFL.ca (archive)

Carlos Armour (born January 31, 1986) is an American former professional football linebacker who played for the Saskatchewan Roughriders of the Canadian Football League. He was signed as a street free agent by the Roughriders in 2009. He played college football for the Miami Hurricanes.
