= Ryan Lucas (Canadian football) =

Canadian football player (born 1984)

No. 94
- Position: Defensive tackle

Personal information
- Born: October 23, 1984 (age 42); Vancouver, British Columbia
- Listed height: 6 ft 5 in (1.96 m)
- Listed weight: 290 lb (132 kg)

Career information
- University: Western Washington

Career history
- 2007–2008: Montreal Alouettes
- 2010–2011: Saskatchewan Roughriders
- 2011: Montreal Alouettes
- 2012–2014: Winnipeg Blue Bombers
- Stats at CFL.ca (archive)

Ryan Lucas (born October 23, 1984, in Vancouver, British Columbia) is a Canadian former professional football defensive tackle who last played for the Winnipeg Blue Bombers of the Canadian Football League. He was originally signed by the Montreal Alouettes as a free agent on December 25, 2006, and spent the majority of the 2007 and 2008 seasons on the practice roster. Lucas signed with the Saskatchewan Roughriders on June 1, 2010, as a free agent. He was claimed by the Montreal Alouettes off the Riders' practice roster on July 31, 2011, and released in the following off-season on March 26, 2012. He played college football for the Western Washington Vikings. On January 8, 2015, Lucas announced his retirement from professional football.
