= James Patrick (Canadian football) =

American gridiron football player (born 1982)

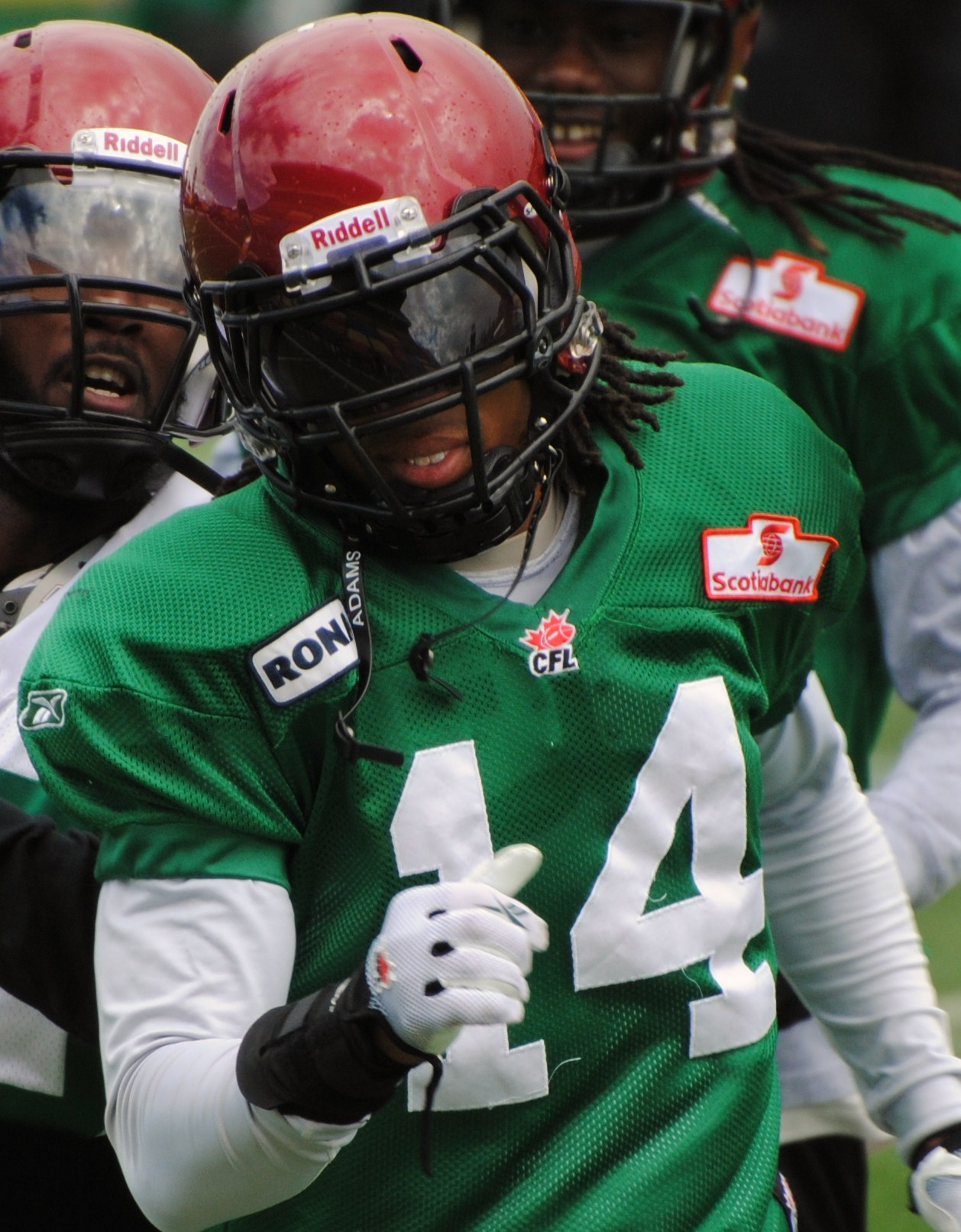

No. 14
- Position: Safety

Personal information
- Born: June 4, 1982 (age 44); Tuskegee, Alabama, U.S.
- Listed height: 5 ft 11 in (1.80 m)
- Listed weight: 175 lb (79 kg)

Career information
- College: Stillman

Career history
- 2005–2006: Tampa Bay Buccaneers*
- 2006: New England Patriots*
- 2008–2012: Saskatchewan Roughriders
- 2013: Hamilton Tiger-Cats
- * Offseason or practice squad member only

Awards and highlights
- CFL All-Star (2010); CFL West All-Star (2010)
- Stats at CFL.ca (archive)

James Patrick (born June 7, 1982) is an American former professional football safety who played in the Canadian Football League (CFL). He was originally signed by the Tampa Bay Buccaneers as an undrafted free agent in 2005 and also spent time on the practice squad of the New England Patriots. He played college football at Stillman College.

== Professional career ==
=== Saskatchewan Roughriders ===
Patrick spent five seasons with the Saskatchewan Roughriders after signing as a free agent in 2008. He was an all-star in 2010, when he recorded 68 tackles, nine interceptions and a touchdown. Unfortunately, In 2012, he had his worst statistical year since his rookie season, registering 40 tackles and no interceptions. As a result, it was his final season with the Riders as he was released in the off-season.

=== Hamilton Tiger-Cats ===
Through the first four games of the 2013 CFL season Patrick recorded 12 tackles and 4 special teams tackles, and was released following a Week 4 blowout. In his career, he has 239 defensive tackles, 18 interceptions and two sacks as of July 24, 2013.

== Personal life ==
His brother, Qua Cox, played football at Jackson State University and for the Indianapolis Colts.
