= David McKoy =

Canadian football player (born 1983)

No. 83
- Position: Wide receiver

Personal information
- Born: July 5, 1983 (age 43); Mississauga, Ontario, Canada
- Listed height: 6 ft 2 in (1.88 m)
- Listed weight: 205 lb (93 kg)

Career information
- University: Guelph
- CFL draft: 2007: 2nd round, 9th overall pick

Career history
- Saskatchewan Roughriders (2007–2009); Winnipeg Blue Bombers (2010); Toronto Argonauts (2011–?)

David McKoy (born July 5, 1983) is a Canadian former professional football wide receiver. He was originally drafted ninth overall by the Saskatchewan Roughriders in the 2007 CFL draft. He played CIS Football at Guelph.

Due to a knee injury suffered in 2007 and recurring problems the following two years, McKoy has played sparingly during his CFL career. He played in the first nine games of 2007 and both playoff games in 2009.

The Saskatchewan Roughriders released McKoy on June 5, 2010 after he failed his physical testing.

McKoy was signed by the Winnipeg Blue Bombers on August 3, 2010. After still having difficulty with his knee, he was released on August 5, 2010. McKoy was re-signed by the Bombers on March 16, 2011.

McKoy signed a practice roster agreement with the Toronto Argonauts on August 8, 2011.
