= Kevin Scott (Canadian football) =

Canadian football player (born 1983)

Profile
- Positions: Long snapper, Linebacker

Personal information
- Born: July 17, 1983 (age 43); Ottawa, Ontario, Canada
- Listed height: 6 ft 3 in (1.91 m)
- Listed weight: 232 lb (105 kg)

Career information
- University: Queen's

Career history
- 2008–2009: Saskatchewan Roughriders
- 2011–2013: Hamilton Tiger-Cats
- 2014: Ottawa Redblacks
- Stats at CFL.ca

Kevin Scott (born July 17, 1983) is a Canadian former professional football long snapper and linebacker who played six seasons in the Canadian Football League. He played CIS Football at Queen's.

== Professional career ==
=== Saskatchewan Roughriders ===
Scott was originally signed by the Saskatchewan Roughriders as an undrafted free agent in 2008 and played in two seasons for the team. He was released by the Roughriders on May 27, 2010.

=== Hamilton Tiger-Cats ===
After sitting out the 2010 season, Scott signed with the Hamilton Tiger-Cats on June 7, 2011. He played for the Tiger-Cats for three years and became a free agent on February 11, 2014.

=== Ottawa Redblacks ===
On February 12, 2014, Scott signed with the expansion Ottawa Redblacks. He played in 17 regular season games in 2014 where he had 10 special teams tackles. He announced his retirement on February 13, 2015, with the intention to become a police officer.
