= Denatay Heard =

American gridiron football player (born 1984)

Profile
- Position: Cornerback

Personal information
- Born: March 18, 1984 (age 42); LaGrange, Georgia
- Listed height: 5 ft 8 in (1.73 m)
- Listed weight: 175 lb (79 kg)

Career information
- College: Stillman

Career history
- 2008–2009: Saskatchewan Roughriders
- 2010: Toronto Argonauts*
- 2012: Edmonton Eskimos*
- * Offseason or practice squad member only
- Stats at CFL.ca

Denatay Heard (born March 18, 1984) is a former cornerback in the Canadian Football League. He signed with the Edmonton Eskimos on June 4, 2012, and was released on June 12, 2012. He played college football at Stillman.
