= Kitwana Jones =

American gridiron football player (born 1981)

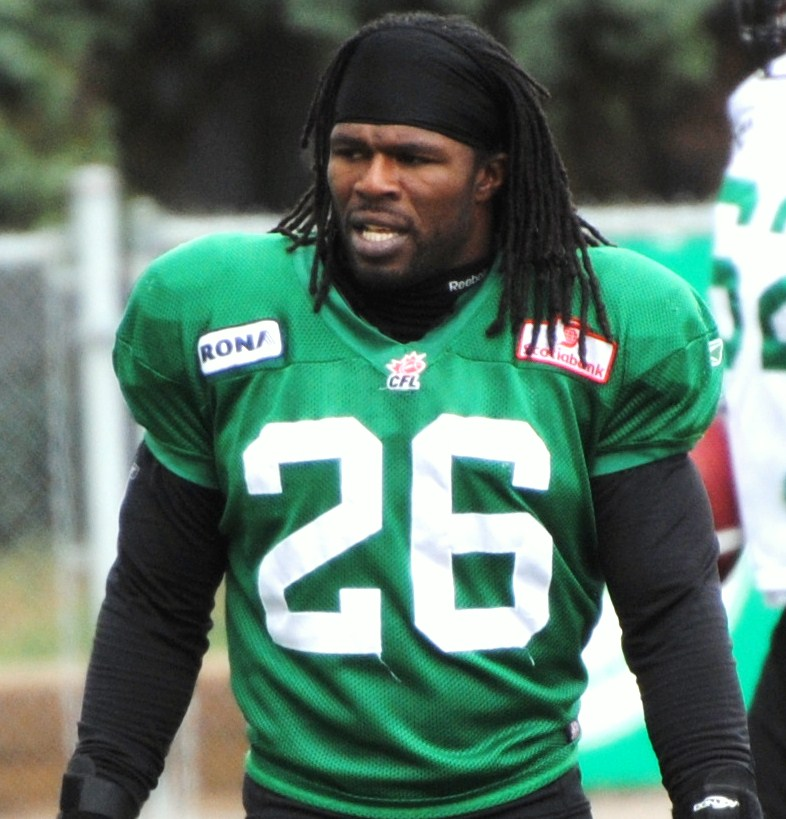
- Jones with the Saskatchewan Roughriders in 2010

Profile
- Position: Defensive end

Personal information
- Born: July 7, 1981 (age 45); Wilmington, North Carolina, U.S.
- Listed height: 6 ft 0 in (1.83 m)
- Listed weight: 240 lb (109 kg)

Career information
- High school: Emsley A. Laney (NC)
- College: Hampton

Career history
- 2005–2008: Saskatchewan Roughriders
- 2009: Edmonton Eskimos
- 2009–2010: Saskatchewan Roughriders
- 2011: Montreal Alouettes

Awards and highlights
- Grey Cup champion (2007)
- Stats at CFL.ca (archive)

Kitwana Shaloyd Jones (born July 7, 1981) is an American former professional football defensive end who played in the Canadian Football League (CFL). He was signed by the Saskatchewan Roughriders as an undrafted free agent in 2005. Jones also played professionally for the Edmonton Eskimos and Montreal Alouettes. He played college football at the University of North Carolina and Hampton University.

== Playing career ==
=== College football ===
Jones started his college football career at the University of North Carolina (UNC), where he saw playing time as a true freshman in 2000. He played mainly on special teams at North Carolina. He also spent time practicing as a fullback. Jones left the UNC football program for disciplinary reasons and then joined Hampton University for his final two seasons of college football. While at Hampton, Jones started 19 games, including 11 in his senior season. After his 2003 season, Jones was named All-Conference (Mid-Eastern Athletic Conference) and Division I-AA All-America.

=== Professional football ===
Jones started his professional career in the Canadian Football League (CFL) when he was signed by the Saskatchewan Roughriders in March, 2005. He made his debut with the club in Week 10 of the 2005 CFL season. He finished his rookie CFL season with 15 tackles (11 on special teams) and one quarterback sack. Jones played on defense and special teams for the Roughriders in 2006, finishing the season with 31 tackles and eight quarterback sacks. During the 2006 season, Jones twice recorded two sacks in a game. The Roughriders captured the 2007 Grey Cup, with Jones playing defensive end and linebacker as well playing on special teams. During the Western Final, Jones had two fumble recoveries. Jones played defensive end full-time for the Roughriders in the 2008 season and led the team in sacks with five.

Prior to the 2009 season, Jones was traded to the Edmonton Eskimos in return for quarterback Juan Joseph. Jones played in nine games for the Eskimos before being released. After his release, he had offers to join the Roughriders or the Montreal Alouettes, and Jones elected to sign back with the Roughriders. Roughriders director of player personnel Joe Womack admitted that trading Jones had been a mistake: "Eric (Tillman, Saskatchewan's GM) and myself and Ken (Miller, the Roughriders' head coach) admittedly probably made a mistake -- and that's OK to admit that; teams do it all the time." Joseph, the player the Roughriders received in exchange for Jones was released by the club after training camp. Jones finished the 2009 season with 14 tackles.

Heading into the 2010 season, Jones was not mentioned among the top contenders on the Roughriders to replace departing defensive linemen John Chick and Stevie Baggs, which suited him fine, "I’m always the undersized guy at my position. There are things that I have to do to remain a Roughrider but I know that I’m in a fight. Then again, I’m always fighting." Jones also sees significant playing time on special teams, where he is considered by some to be among the CFL's best.

On Mar 13, 2011, Jones signed with the Montreal Alouettes.

On May 7, 2012, Jones was released by the Alouettes.

== Personal ==
Jones grew up in Wilmington, North Carolina, where he was one of ten children. He attended Emsley A. Laney High School, the alma mater of Michael Jordan. Jones also spent a year at Fork Union Military Academy. He has one son, Tyleke, whom he fathered when he was 14. Jones spends time in the off-season mentoring troubled youth in his home town of Wilmington, and spends time during the season with young fans who have special needs.

While Jones was with the Eskimos, he acquired the nickname 'Batman' after an incident in which he chased down and apprehended a mugger who had stolen a woman's purse. Jones said of the incident, "God just put me in a good place where I could help someone. He knows what kind of heart I have."
