= Leron Mitchell =

Canadian football player (born 1981)

Profile
- Position: Cornerback

Personal information
- Born: November 24, 1981 (age 44); London, Ontario, Canada
- Listed height: 6 ft 1 in (1.85 m)
- Listed weight: 200 lb (91 kg)

Career information
- University: Western Ontario
- CFL draft: 2006: 2nd round, 10th overall pick

Career history
- 2006–2008: Toronto Argonauts
- 2008–2011: Saskatchewan Roughriders
- Stats at CFL.ca (archive)

Leron Mitchell (born November 24, 1981) is a Canadian former professional football defensive back who played in the Canadian Football League (CFL) with the Toronto Argonauts and Saskatchewan Roughriders.
