= Duane Forde =

Canadian gridiron football player (born 1969)

Profile
- Position: Fullback

Personal information
- Born: May 8, 1969 (age 57); Toronto, Ontario, Canada

Career information
- University: Western Ontario
- CFL draft: 1991: 1st round, 6th overall pick

Career history
- 1991–1992: Calgary Stampeders
- 1993: Winnipeg Blue Bombers
- 1994–1995: Toronto Argonauts
- 1996–2000: Calgary Stampeders
- 2001–2002: Hamilton Tiger-Cats

Awards and highlights
- 2× Grey Cup champion (1992, 1998); Vanier Cup champion (1989, also team captain); Mississauga Sports Hall of Fame

Duane Curtis Forde (born May 8, 1969) is a Canadian television broadcaster for TSN and a former player in the Canadian Football League (CFL).

== Career ==
=== College football ===
Born in Toronto, Forde attended the University of Western Ontario in London, Ontario where he obtained his Bachelor of Arts, Honours in Physical Education. While studying at Western, Forde played CIAU football for the Western Ontario Mustangs from 1987 to 1990. While he was at UWO, the Mustangs lost just once in the regular season, and they won the 1989 Vanier Cup. Selected two times as the Mustangs' Most Valuable Player, Forde co-captained the 1989 team.

=== CFL ===
Forde played twelve seasons for the Calgary Stampeders, Winnipeg Blue Bombers, Toronto Argonauts, and Hamilton Tiger-Cats. Forde, who spent four years as the team captain of the Stampeders, had a consecutive games played streak of 150, counting regular season and postseason games, over an eight-season period. Forde's teams reached the Grey Cup on five occasions (1991, 1992, 1993, 1998, and 1999), winning twice (1992 and 1998).

=== Broadcasting ===
In 2008, Forde joined TSN as a game analyst for their CFL on TSN broadcasts. Forde serves as the secondary commentator, calling games with play by play announcer Rod Black, and later with Rod Smith. Forde was also an analyst for TSN.ca's coverage of the 2008 CFL draft. He also contributes regularly to TSN's Sportscentre and writes a weekly column for TSN.ca. Before joining TSN, Forde served as a commentator for The Score's CIS football telecasts from 2006 to 2007 and was a CFL analyst for Rogers Sportsnet from 2003 to 2005. He has been known as the premier Canadian College Draft expert and occasionally referred to by media members as the Mel Kiper Jr. of the CFL.

Since 2010, Forde has run the National Invitational Combine during the same week that the CFL holds its own evaluation camp.

Forde is a member of the Mississauga Sports Hall of Fame.

== Personal life ==
He is married to sports journalist Sheri Forde.
