= Daniel Valente =

Canadian football player (born 1999)

No. 46
- Position: Defensive back

Personal information
- Born: October 23, 1999 (age 27); London, Ontario, Canada
- Listed height: 5 ft 10 in (1.78 m)
- Listed weight: 180 lb (82 kg)

Career information
- High school: Catholic Central (London)
- University: Western (2017–2022)
- CFL draft: 2022: 4th round, 31st overall pick

Career history
- 2022–2023: Ottawa Redblacks*
- 2023: Montreal Alouettes*
- 2023: Toronto Argonauts
- * Offseason or practice squad member only

Awards and highlights
- 2× Vanier Cup champion (2017, 2021); 2× First-team All-Canadian (2021–2022); 2× First-team OUA (2021–2022)
- Stats at CFL.ca

Daniel Valente Jr. (born October 23, 1999) is a Canadian former professional football defensive back who played for the Toronto Argonauts of the Canadian Football League (CFL). He played U Sports football at Western. He was also a member of the Ottawa Redblacks and Montreal Alouettes.

== Early life ==
Daniel Valente Jr. played high school football at Catholic Central High School in London, Ontario. He played junior football for the London Junior Mustangs of the Ontario Varsity Football League (OVFL) and was a multi-time OVFL all-star. Valente also represented Team Canada in the U-19 International Bowl against the United States on January 28, 2017.

== University career ==
Valente played U Sports football at Western from 2017 to 2022. Western won the 53rd Vanier Cup in 2017 and the 56th Vanier Cup in 2021. In 2021, Valente earned first team All-Canadian and first team All-Ontario University Athletics (OUA) honors while also being named the Outstanding Defensive Player of the Game of the 56th Vanier Cup. After spending time with the Ottawa Redblacks of the Canadian Football League (CFL), Valente returned to Western for his final season of U Sports football in 2022. In 2022, he again garnered first team All-Canadian and first team All-OUA recognition while also being named the OUA's Outstanding Stand-Up Defensive Player of the Year.

== Professional career ==
Pre-draft measurables
Height	Weight	40-yard dash	20-yard shuttle	Three-cone drill	Vertical jump	Broad jump
5 ft 10 1/8 in (1.78 m)	175 lb (79 kg)	4.68 s	4.15 s	7.04 s	33.5 in (0.85 m)	9 ft 10 3/4 in (3.02 m)
All values from CFL Combine

Valente was selected by the Ottawa Redblacks of the Canadian Football League (CFL) in the fourth round, with the 31st overall pick, of the 2022 CFL draft. He signed with the team on May 9, 2022. He was moved to the practice roster on June 5, released from the practice roster on July 7, re-signed to the practice roster on July 12, and released from the practice roster on July 19, 2022, returning to Western for his final season of U Sports football. Valente re-signed with the Redblacks on December 7, 2022. He was released on June 9, 2023, and signed to the practice roster on June 26 before being released on August 15, 2023.

Valente was signed to the practice roster of the Montreal Alouettes on August 29, 2023, and released by the team on September 28, 2023.

Valente was signed to the Toronto Argonauts' practice roster on October 2, 2023. He was promoted to the active roster on October 27 and dressed in one game for the Argonauts but did not record any statistics. He was placed on injured reserve on November 10, 2023. Valente re-signed with the team for the 2024 season, but was released at the start of training camp on May 15, 2024.

== Coaching career ==
Valente later became the defensive backs coach at Western.
