= Metras =

Metras may refer to:

- John P. Metras (1909–1982), an American coach of Canadian football
- John Metras (1940–2020), a Canadian football player
- J. P. Metras Trophy, a Canadian football trophy
