= Vincent Desjardins =

Canadian gridiron football player (born 1995)

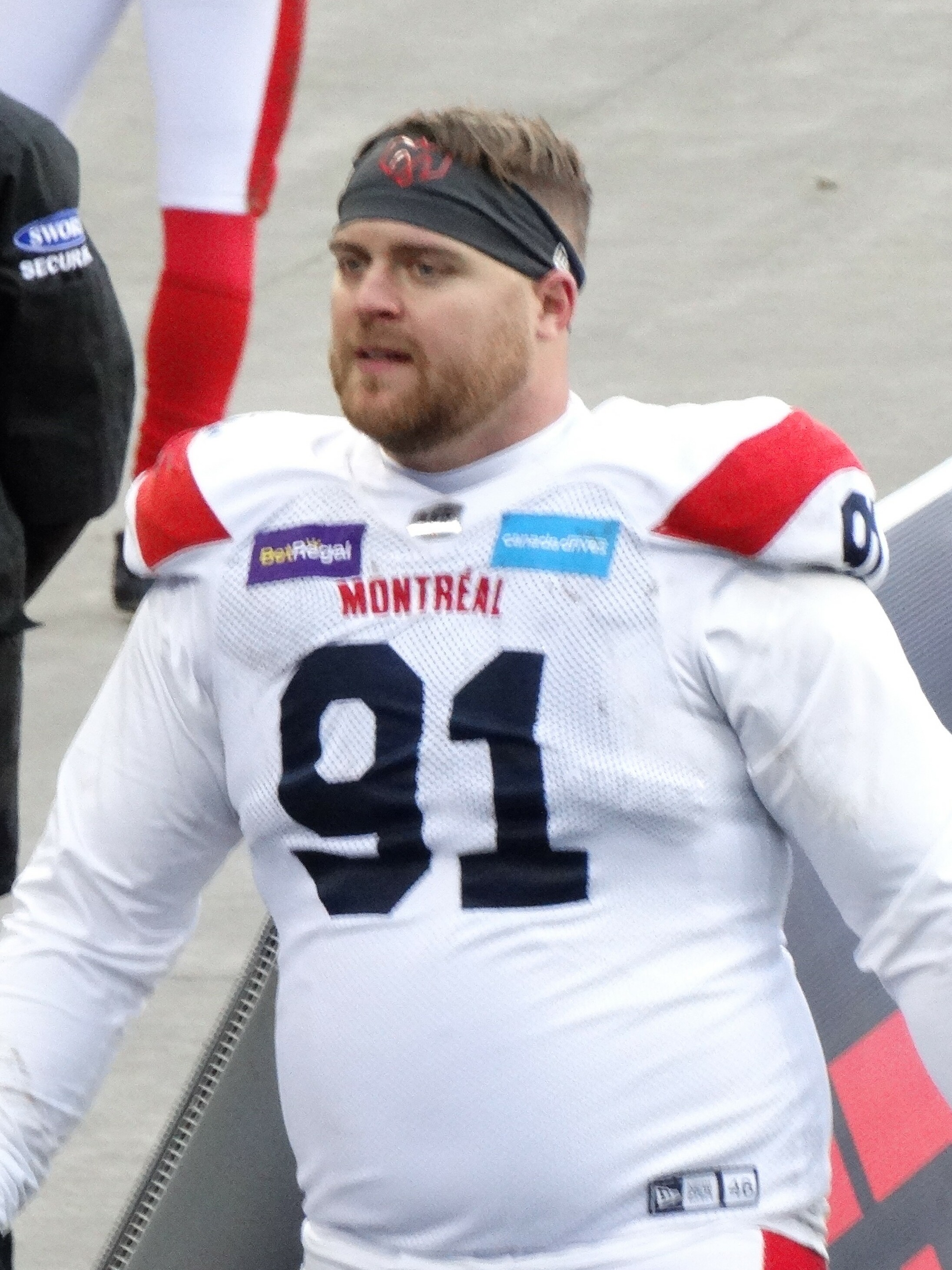
- Desjardins with the Montreal Alouettes in 2022

Profile
- Position: Defensive lineman

Personal information
- Born: March 12, 1995 (age 31); Quebec City, Quebec, Canada
- Listed height: 6 ft 1 in (1.85 m)
- Listed weight: 260 lb (118 kg)

Career information
- University: Laval
- CFL draft: 2019: 2nd round, 17th overall pick

Career history
- 2019–2021: Calgary Stampeders
- 2022–2023: Montreal Alouettes

Awards and highlights
- Grey Cup champion (2023); Vanier Cup champion (2016, 2018); 3× First-team All-Canadian (2016, 2017, 2018)
- Stats at CFL.ca

Vincent Desjardins (born March 12, 1995) is a Canadian professional football defensive lineman. He played U Sports football at Université Laval. He has been a member of the Calgary Stampeders and Montreal Alouettes.

== University career ==
Desjardins played U Sports football for the Laval Rouge et Or from 2015 to 2018. In his second season, in 2016, he was named a First Team U Sports All-Canadian and ended as a Vanier Cup champion after the Laval Rouge et Or defeated the Calgary Dinos in the 52nd Vanier Cup. In 2017, he was again named a First Team All-Canadian, but ended his season with a loss in the 53rd Vanier Cup to the Western Mustangs. In his final year, in 2018, he was named a First Team All-Canadian for the third time and won his second national championship after the Rouge et Or won the 54th Vanier Cup. Desjardins finished his university career having played in 25 regular season games and recorded 51 tackles, including 25 tackles for loss, 11.5 sacks, four forced fumbles, and one fumble recovery.

== Professional career ==
Pre-draft measurables
Height	Weight	40-yard dash	20-yard shuttle	Three-cone drill	Vertical jump	Broad jump	Bench press
6 ft 0 7/8 in (1.85 m)	260 lb (118 kg)	5.14 s	4.62 s	7.65 s	28.0 in (0.71 m)	8 ft 4 1/8 in (2.54 m)	25 reps
All values from CFL Combine

=== Calgary Stampeders ===
After becoming eligible for the 2019 CFL draft, Desjardins was drafted in the second round, 17th overall, by the Calgary Stampeders and signed with the team on May 13, 2019. Following training camp in 2019, he made the team's roster, initially as a reserve, and then made his professional debut on June 29, 2019, against the BC Lions. Desjardins dressed in 11 regular season games where he recorded one forced fumble. He made his post-season debut that year in the West Semi-Final, but the Stampeders lost to the Winnipeg Blue Bombers.

Desjardins did not play in 2020 due to the cancellation of the 2020 CFL season. In 2021, he played in nine regular season games where he recorded the first three defensive tackles of his career. He became a free agent upon the expiry of his rookie contract on February 8, 2022.

=== Montreal Alouettes ===
On February 11, 2022, Desjardins signed with the Montreal Alouettes to a one-year contract. He played in four regular season games and had one defensive tackle while spending the rest of the season on the practice roster. He also played in both post-season games that year, but did not record any statistics. Desjardins re-signed with the Alouettes on February 21, 2023. On June 3, 2023, at the end of training camp, Desjardins was released by the Alouettes. However, he was re-signed by the Alouettes on August 29, 2023.
