= Western Mustang Band =

Marching band for the University of Western Ontario

- School: The University of Western Ontario
- Location: London, Ontario Canada
- Founded: 1937; 89 years ago
- Fight song: "Western"
- Website: westernmustangband.uwo.ca

The Western Mustang Band (WMB) is the marching band for the University of Western Ontario in London, Ontario, Canada. The band performs at every home football game for the Western Mustangs at TD Stadium in the fall term as well as other athletic events such as basketball and hockey games throughout the year. Its nickname is "The Pride of Western".

The band today comprises brass, percussion, and woodwind instruments played by students from varying faculties on campus, and is led by a drum major.

Other band activities include a variety of Santa Claus parades, Orientation week activities, and social events for the University and the community at large.

== History ==
=== Early formation and the Canadian Officer Training Corps ===
In 1923, a band was formed under the direction of Sidney Kingsmill on the newly developed University of Western Ontario campus. Kingsmill was a well-known musician at Western and developed a small group of other musicians to join in the parades down to the stadium before a Western rugby game. This group became known as the "University Band". With limited resources, the band did not develop after the fall of 1923. However in 1926, the band restarted under the direction of Bruce Wiley. This new organization had more resources due to financial and administrative assistance from Paul McKibben, the Dean of Western's School of Medicine. During this time, the band got funding through an applied grant and a practice space for marching drill.

Ross Willis organized the band as the director in 1928 and the Canadian Officer Training Corps (COTC) took formal control of the band in 1929. The COTC had access to finances set aside from the Department of National Defence and purchased instruments and sheet music. Under the direction of the COTC, the band got a full uniform and would dress same as the military unit, with the khaki-coloured tunic and pants and a brimmed cap.

The band continued to play at football games and received high praise from the university during this time for increasing school spirit.

In 1932, controversy arose towards the band being at football games. One argument stated that having a band based in military roots was an inappropriate feature and that the band looked "too out of place", being dressed in full military uniforms. Others argued that it is better to have a band attend the games as entertainment than not attend. Ultimately the band continued to appear at football games.

=== Don Wright's involvement ===
Don Wright became involved in the band, playing trumpet while getting his undergraduate degree. He became bandleader in 1933. Although he left after 1933, he came back to direct the band in 1935 after he was asked.

Wright arranged all the music for the band, including the addition of three Herald Trumpets. The trumpets would perform fanfares prior to the entry of the band into the stadium. The instrumentation of the band at this time was standard and included flutes, clarinets, saxophones, as well as brass along with snare drums and a bass drum.

The band started to play Wright's jazz arrangements at football games during this time and became notable amongst the crowds.

In 1936, the University Student Council at Western put on a drive for funds to support the purchase of new uniforms. At this point, the band diverted from the COTC contingent and became known as the Western Mustang Band. The band performed for the first time on October 2, 1937. The band was now organized under the University Student Council.

Notably during this time, the drum major selected was female. Wright purposefully chose Beth Forbes for the position and felt strongly about having a female in the leadership role.

=== Western Mustang Band ===
==== 1940s and 1950s ====
The band ceased operations in 1940 due to World War II and all other extra-curricular activities at the university were stopped. Don Wright left the band at this time to help with the war effort.

After the war however, the band reorganized for the 1945 football season.

To increase size, the band opened membership to both Western students and local London high school students in 1950. This program was gradually phased out in the later part of the 1950s.

1953 was the first year the band acquired a female band member, Jane Perkins. Perkins joined the band on trumpet. Up until this point, the only female members in the band were majorettes or colour party members. Popularity grew amongst both genders and in 1957, it was regarded that the band had an entire row of girls.

Marvin Kwitko took over as bandmaster in the 1954 season. He was composed and arranged the music the band played. The band during this time had 45 musicians. Under Kwitko's direction, practices were scheduled four times a week. Kwitko left the band in 1956.

Brien MacDonald became the director after Kwitko in 1956 and helped to get new uniforms. Prior to this, the band had been using the 45 uniforms originally purchased by the USC in 1937. The new uniforms had the same design as the previous, but were updated and made of newer fabric and included shoulder epaulets. The uniforms were purchased with the assistance of the Purple Spur Society and the Alumni Association, who contributed funds to help offset total costs.

==== 1960s ====
In 1959, Ron Brown became bandmaster. Under Brown's direction, he instituted daily practice. The band remained at the maximum member count of 45 men. During this time, Brown excluded women from the band as musicians. Women were only allowed in the majorette section. This idea did not change for the entirety that Brown was bandmaster. From 1960 to 1965, Brown grew the band to a size of 65-85 members. The band at this time received positive praise from game attendees and the press.

Brown left as director in 1968 and membership declined that year. At this point, the band size reduced to 22 members.

==== 1970s ====
In 1970, the University Student Council president identified the marching band as an extra-curricular in need of support and lobbied the increase funding by $6,000, through the Board of Governors. The new funding provided the band new cost-effective uniforms consisting of purple sweaters with as Western crest, white Stetson hats, white pants and white shoes.

Membership numbers at 45 members in 1971. During this year, the band flew to Halifax to support the football team at the 7th Vanier Cup. In 1974, the band had 64 members in total.

The Band played at the 9th Vanier Cup at CNE Stadium in Toronto, on November 22, 1973, backing up Shirley Eikhard who sang the National Anthem. The next day, the Band marched in the Grey Cup Parade, for the 61st Grey Cup. In 1974, the band performed at the 10th Vanier Cup game at CNE Stadium in Toronto.

==== 1980s to 2010s ====
Brad Masters was brought on as director in 1981. Masters secured funding from various organizations, allowing for the purchase of new instruments and uniforms. By the mid-1980s, membership again dwindled, and a series of articles criticizing the band's unprofessional atmosphere began appearing in the Western Gazette. The band languished throughout this era, and would not regain their professional form until the mid-2000s, with the onset of some new instruments and newer uniforms.

The band received full, professional uniforms in 2007. The annual Toronto and London Santa Claus Parades continued to be a part of the band activities every year, as well as the Montreal St. Patrick's Day Parade which was added in 2005.

More activities outside of the traditional marching band circle garnered attention to the band, starting in 2007. The band participated at the request of Marianas Trench in the 2007 MMVA's for their red-carpet entrance. The following year, the band performed with Let's Go to War at the 2008 Virgin Mobile Music Festival in Toronto. This performance mixed both electronic and more traditional genres by utilizing the band instrumentation alongside a DJ.

In recent years, the band has been in Shawn Mendes' 2014 music video for Something Big, performed at the finale of the 2016 Toronto Fashion Week for Greta Constantine playing an arrangement of "Happy" by Pharrell Williams.

==== 2017–2024 ====
After a successful student-led referendum in February 2015, the band secured stable funding, which enabled it to transition out from under the USC. After 78 years, it became part of a new organizational structure within the Athletics Department under the umbrella of Western Student Experience. Quinn Fleming, a prominent advocate for the referendum at the time, was appointed Director. Under his leadership, the band experienced significant growth, reaching its largest size and achieving its most notable success since the 1960s.

In 2019, the band performed Fleming's arrangement of Loud Luxury's hit Body alongside the cheerleading team as part of the opening act with Loud Luxury at the 2019 Juno Awards. He later advocated for the band's funding to be increased 300% in February 2020. The band continues using many of Fleming's arrangements, including the Western Fight Song, the Alma Mater, the March to the Stadium, the Pregame Fanfare, I Wanna Go Back to Western U, and football cheer packs. The band declined in size from a high of 85 members in 2019 to 38 members in 2025.

== Music ==
=== Western Song ===
Walter Smither wrote the school song known as Western, with lyrics written by Margaret Ovens. The melody was originally rejected as a school song while Smither was at Beck Collegiate. In 1930, the melody along with new lyrics was submitted in a contest to the university's student council. It subsequently won and became the official school song of Western University.

In 1931, Don Wright added to the song by including another melody after Smither's original composition. Not an original melody, Wright included an arrangement of the chorus of "Washington and Lee Swing", which is a commonly used school fight song.

==== Caninny cheer ====
The school song is traditionally followed by the Western school cheer, Caninny. This cheer has been used as a spirit cheer by Western students since the early 1920s, originating from early football games.

== Composition ==
=== Instrumentation ===
The band currently consists of members from various faculties at the University of Western Ontario main campus as well as the affiliated colleges. The instruments used reflect that of most full modern college-level marching bands.

Hornline
- Marching Bells
- Piccolo / Flute
- Clarinet
- Alto, Tenor, and Baritone Saxophone
- B♭Trumpet
- Mellophone
- Trombone
- Marching Baritone Horn
- Sousaphone

Drumline
- Snare Drum
- Bass Drum
- Tenor Drums
- Wedge Snare
- Cymbals

=== Drum major ===
Since the band's inception, it has had a drum major as the leader of the band through drill. This position directs the band in motion and movement, as well as conduct the band. The drum major of the Western Mustang Band uses modern college marching band techniques of vocal, whistle, and baton commands to instruct the band.

=== Student leadership ===
The band is composed of a student leadership team which is tasked with the logistics of the day-to-day operations of the band as well as securing future opportunities and functions for the band to participate in. The team is made entirely of band members, and is overseen by the director as well as the Western Athletics Department.

=== Funding ===
In 2015, the band held a successful student referendum securing a steady cash flow of 50 cents from the ancillary fees of every part-time and full-time student. That same year, the band received a donation from the Alumni Association's Legacy Committee primarily for new uniforms. The uniforms were introduced in 2017. In February 2021, Director Quinn Fleming advocated to the USC to have the fee increased from $0.50 to $2.00.

In addition to external funding, band members also pay yearly fees to help offset costs of instrument repairs, uniform cleanings and repairs, busses for events, staff, new music, shoes and other clothing, and any equipment or field rentals.

== Notable events, achievements and awards ==
=== Annual events ===
- Toronto Santa Claus Parade
- Burlington Santa Claus Parade
- Toronto St. Patrick's Day Parade

=== Athletic events ===
- Raptors' Halftime Show (2005, 2006, and 2010)
- London Knights home playoff games (2009)
- NHL Exhibition Game (2007 and 2008)
- 76th Grey Cup Parade (1988)
- Can-Am Bowl Halftime Show in Tampa, Florida (1978)
- Played both pre-game and halftime shows at the College Bowl (later Vanier Cup) in Toronto (1964)
- Grey Cup Parade (the "fog bowl" game) (1963)

=== Media events and performances ===
- 2019 Juno Awards show opener with Loud Luxury (2019)
- Toronto Fashion Week, Greta Constantine runway performance (2016)
- MuchMusic Video Awards Red Carpet (2009)
- On stage with Let's Go To War at the Virgin Festival in Toronto (2008)
- On the set of Are You Smarter Than a Canadian 5th Grader? (2007)

=== Music videos ===
- Something Big by Shawn Mendes (2014)
- Amadeus by JoJo Worthington (2014)
- The Bells by Lowell (2014)
