= Zack Fry =

Canadian gridiron football player (born 2000)

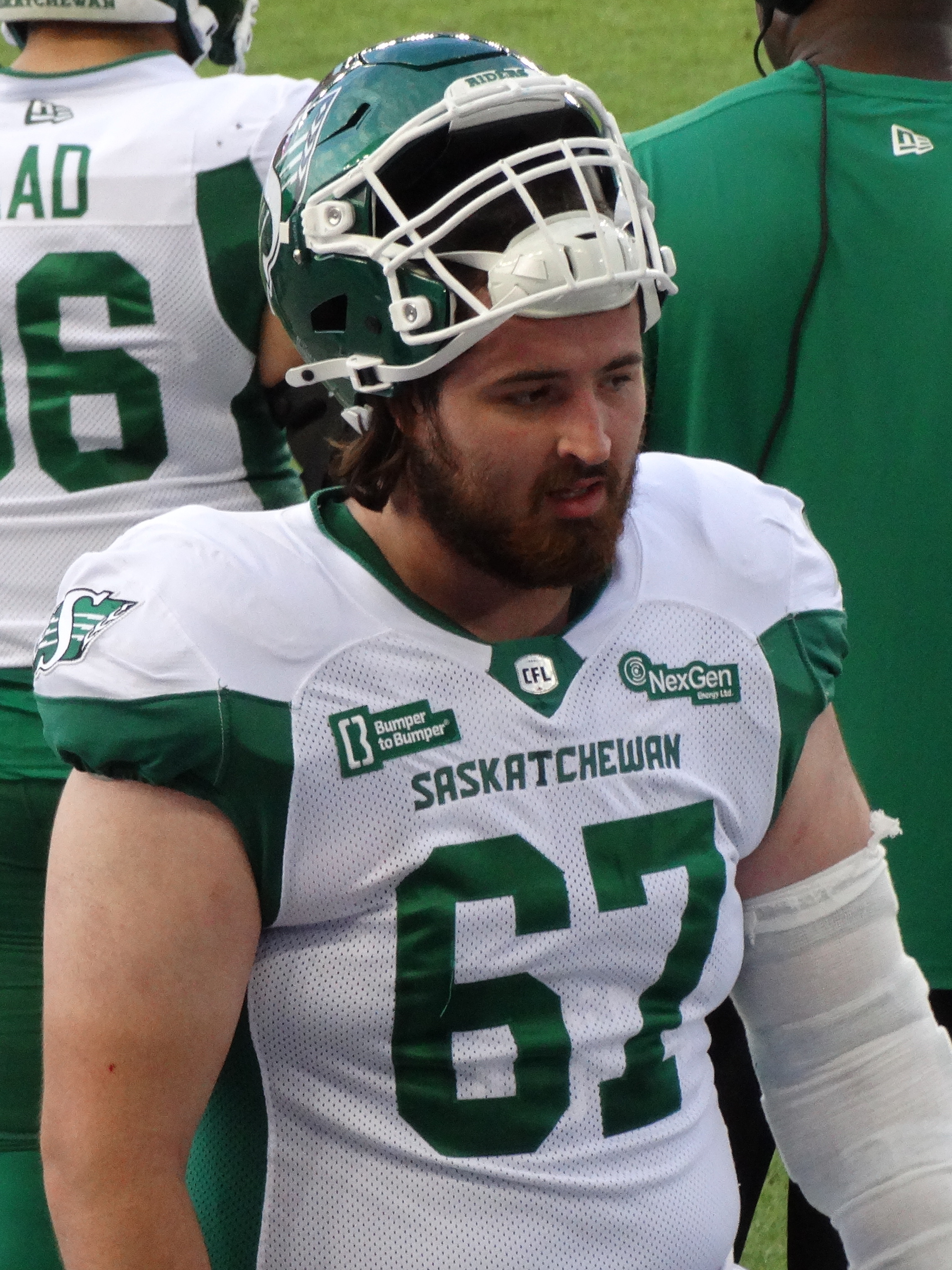
- Fry with the Saskatchewan Roughriders in 2025

No. 67 – Saskatchewan Roughriders
- Position: Offensive lineman
- Roster status: 1-game injured list
- CFL status: National

Personal information
- Born: September 3, 2000 (age 26); London, Ontario, Canada
- Listed height: 6 ft 5 in (1.96 m)
- Listed weight: 288 lb (131 kg)

Career information
- University: Western
- CFL draft: 2022: 2nd round, 16th overall pick

Career history
- 2022: Saskatchewan Roughriders*
- 2023–present: Saskatchewan Roughriders
- * Offseason or practice squad member only

Awards and highlights
- Grey Cup champion (2025); Vanier Cup champion (2021); 2× Second-team All-Canadian (2019, 2021)
- Stats at CFL.ca

Zack Fry (born September 3, 2000) is a Canadian professional football offensive lineman for the Saskatchewan Roughriders of the Canadian Football League (CFL). He played at right guard in the 2021 Vanier Cup victory for the Western Mustangs and at right tackle in the 2025 Grey Cup victory for the Saskatchewan Roughriders.

== University career ==
Fry played U Sports football for the Western Mustangs from 2018 to 2022 and appeared in 37 games. He was named a second-team U Sports All-Canadian in 2019 and 2021 and finished the 2021 season as a national champion after the Mustangs defeated the Saskatchewan Huskies in the 56th Vanier Cup game.

== Professional career ==
Pre-draft measurables
Height	Weight	Arm length	Hand span	Wingspan
6 ft 5 3/4 in (1.97 m)	305 lb (138 kg)	32 7/8 in (0.84 m)	9 1/4 in (0.23 m)	6 ft 7 1/2 in (2.02 m)
All values from Pro Day

In the final Canadian Football League's Amateur Scouting Bureau rankings for players eligible for the 2022 CFL draft, Fry was listed as the 14th-best player available. He was then selected in the second round, 16th overall, in the draft by the Saskatchewan Roughriders and signed with the team on May 9, 2022. Following training camp, he returned to the Mustangs for his fourth season of U Sports eligibility. He re-signed with the Roughriders after the season ended on November 29, 2022.

Following training camp in 2023, Fry began the season on the team's practice roster. He soon after made his professional debut in week 5, on July 7, 2023, against the Edmonton Elks, as a backup offensive lineman. He played in four regular season games while spending time on the injured list and practice roster that year. In the 2024 season, he again began the year on the practice roster, but was called up to the active roster in week 3. Fry made his first career start, at left guard, on August 8, 2024, against the Ottawa Redblacks. He dressed in 12 regular season games, starting in six, and also started in both playoff games that year.

In 2025, Fry made the team's opening day roster and started at left guard against the Redblacks. Fry started eight games during the season for the Roughriders before missing games due to a knee injury.

Fry played in the 2025 Grey Cup game win at right guard for short yardage plays, and blocked for two touchdown scoring runs by the Saskatchewan Roughriders' quarterback against the Montreal Alouettes in the 25-17 victory. He played most of the fourth quarter of the game at left tackle.

Fry wears the playing jersey number 67, which was the same number worn by former CFL Hall of Fame offensive tackle Clyde Brock when he played for Saskatchewan Roughriders on the famous offensive line from 1964 to 1975.
