= 2019 Calgary Stampeders season =

Canadian football team season

- Owner: Calgary Sports and Entertainment
- General manager: John Hufnagel
- President: John Hufnagel
- Head coach: Dave Dickenson
- Home stadium: McMahon Stadium

Results
- Record: 12–6
- Division place: 2nd, West
- Playoffs: Lost West Semi-Final
- Team MOP: Reggie Begelton
- Team MOC: Cory Greenwood
- Team MOR: Nate Holley

Uniform

The 2019 Calgary Stampeders season was the 62nd season for the team in the Canadian Football League (CFL) and their 85th overall. The Stampeders finished with a 12–6 record and hosted the West Semi-Final game in a year where they were also hosting the 107th Grey Cup. Having lost to the Blue Bombers team in the aforementioned playoff game, however, the Stampeders failed to repeat as Grey Cup champions in 2019, marking the first time since 2011 where the Stampeders failed to reach the West Division Final and only the second time since their 2008 Championship-Winning Season. Despite the loss in the opening round of the postseason, the Stampeders qualified for the playoffs for the 15th consecutive year with a week 15 win over the Toronto Argonauts coupled with a loss by the Ottawa Redblacks, the playoff berth being clinched on September 21, 2019. It is the longest playoff streak in franchise history and tied for the fifth-longest streak in CFL history. The 2019 season marked Dave Dickenson's fourth season as head coach and John Hufnagel's 12th season as general manager.

== Offseason ==
=== Foreign drafts ===
For the first time in its history, the CFL held drafts for foreign players from Mexico and Europe. Like all other CFL teams, the Stampeders held three non-tradeable selections in the 2019 CFL–LFA draft, which took place on January 14, 2019. The 2019 European CFL draft took place on April 11, 2019 where all teams held one non-tradeable pick.

Draft	Round	Pick	Player	Position	School/Club team
LFA	1	9	Andrés Salgado	WR	Condors CDMX
LFA	2	18	Oscar Silva	K	Dinos Saltillo
LFA	3	27	Guillermo Leal	DT	UDLAP
Euro	1	9	Roni Salonen	LB	New Yorker Lions

=== CFL draft ===
The 2019 CFL draft took place on May 2, 2019. By virtue of winning the 106th Grey Cup, the Stampeders had the last selection in each of the eight rounds. The team acquired another fourth-round pick after trading Charleston Hughes to the Hamilton Tiger-Cats.

Round	Pick	Player	Position	School
1	8	Hergy Mayala	WR	UConn
2	17	Vincent Desjardins	DL	Laval
3	28	Zack Williams	OL	Manitoba
4	31	Fraser Sopik	LB	Western
4	37	Jaylan Guthrie	OL	Guelph
5	46	Malcolm Lee	DB	British Columbia
6	55	Nicholas Statz	DB	Calgary
7	64	Job Reinhart	LB	Guelph
8	73	Colton Hunchak	WR	York

== Preseason ==
=== Schedule ===
Week	Game	Date	Kickoff	Opponent	Results		TV	Venue	Attendance	Summary
Week	Game	Date	Kickoff	Opponent	Score	Record	TV	Venue	Attendance	Summary
A	Bye									
B	1	Fri, May 31	7:00 p.m. MDT	Saskatchewan Roughriders	W 37–1	1–0	TSN	McMahon Stadium		Recap
C	2	Fri, June 7	8:00 p.m. MDT	@ BC Lions	L 36–38	1–1	TSN	BC Place	14,561	Recap

== Regular season ==
=== Standings ===
West Division
Team	GP	W	L	T	Pts	PF	PA	Div	Stk	
Saskatchewan Roughriders	18	13	5	0	26	487	386	7–3	W3	Details
Calgary Stampeders	18	12	6	0	24	482	407	8–2	W1	Details
Winnipeg Blue Bombers	18	11	7	0	22	508	409	7–3	W1	Details
Edmonton Eskimos	18	8	10	0	16	406	400	3–7	L2	Details
BC Lions	18	5	13	0	10	411	452	0–10	L3	Details

=== Schedule ===
Week	Game	Date	Kickoff	Opponent	Results		TV	Venue	Attendance	Summary
Week	Game	Date	Kickoff	Opponent	Score	Record	TV	Venue	Attendance	Summary
1	1	Sat, June 15	5:00 p.m. MDT	Ottawa Redblacks	L 28–32	0–1	TSN/ESPNews	McMahon Stadium	26,301	Recap
2	Bye									
3	2	Sat, June 29	5:00 p.m. MDT	BC Lions	W 36–32	1–1	TSN	McMahon Stadium	25,130	Recap
4	3	Sat, July 6	8:00 p.m. MDT	@ Saskatchewan Roughriders	W 37–10	2–1	TSN	Mosaic Stadium	29,147	Recap
5	4	Sat, July 13	5:00 p.m. MDT	@ Hamilton Tiger-Cats	L 23–30	2–2	TSN/ESPN2	Tim Hortons Field	22,921	Recap
6	5	Thu, July 18	7:00 p.m. MDT	Toronto Argonauts	W 26–16	3–2	TSN/ESPN2	McMahon Stadium	23,355	Recap
7	6	Thu, July 25	5:00 p.m. MDT	@ Ottawa Redblacks	W 17–16	4–2	TSN/RDS	TD Place Stadium	22,708	Recap
8	7	Sat, Aug 3	5:00 p.m. MDT	Edmonton Eskimos	W 24–18	5–2	TSN	McMahon Stadium	26,597	Recap
9	8	Thu, Aug 8	6:30 p.m. MDT	@ Winnipeg Blue Bombers	L 24–26	5–3	TSN/RDS	IG Field	25,354	Recap
10	9	Sat, Aug 17	5:00 p.m. MDT	Montreal Alouettes	L 34–40 (2OT)	5–4	TSN/RDS	McMahon Stadium	24,453	Recap
11	Bye									
12	10	Mon, Sept 2	2:30 p.m. MDT	Edmonton Eskimos	W 25–9	6–4	TSN	McMahon Stadium	32,350	Recap
13	11	Sat, Sept 7	5:00 p.m. MDT	@ Edmonton Eskimos	W 33–17	7–4	TSN/RDS	Commonwealth Stadium	40,113	Recap
14	12	Sat, Sept 14	2:00 p.m. MDT	Hamilton Tiger-Cats	W 19–18	8–4	TSN	McMahon Stadium	27,962	Recap
15	13	Fri, Sept 20	5:00 p.m. MDT	@ Toronto Argonauts	W 23–16	9–4	TSN/RDS	BMO Field	9,819	Recap
16	Bye									
17	14	Sat, Oct 5	2:00 p.m. MDT	@ Montreal Alouettes	L 17–21	9–5	TSN/RDS	Molson Stadium	18,454	Recap
18	15	Fri, Oct 11	7:30 p.m. MDT	Saskatchewan Roughriders	W 30–28	10–5	TSN	McMahon Stadium	30,210	Recap
19	16	Sat, Oct 19	5:00 p.m. MDT	Winnipeg Blue Bombers	W 37–33	11–5	TSN	McMahon Stadium	26,885	Recap
20	17	Fri, Oct 25	6:30 p.m. MDT	@ Winnipeg Blue Bombers	L 28–29	11–6	TSN	IG Field	24,460	Recap
21	18	Sat, Nov 2	8:00 p.m. MDT	@ BC Lions	W 21–16	12–6	TSN	BC Place	20,210	Recap

== Post-season ==
=== Schedule ===
Game	Date	Kickoff	Opponent	Results		TV	Venue	Attendance	Summary
Game	Date	Kickoff	Opponent	Score	Record	TV	Venue	Attendance	Summary
West Semi-Final	Sun, Nov 10	2:30 p.m. MST	Winnipeg Blue Bombers	L 14–35	0–1	TSN/RDS/ESPN2	McMahon Stadium	24,278	Recap

== Roster ==
2019 Calgary Stampeders final roster
**Quarterbacks**: 9 Nick Arbuckle; 12 Montell Cozart; 19 Bo Levi Mitchell; **Running backs**: 44 Simon Gingras-Gagnon; 25 Don Jackson; 23 William Langlais; 34 Ante Milanovic-Litre; 46 Charlie Power; 38 Terry Williams; **Receivers**: 84 Reggie Begelton; 83 Josh Huff; 89 Colton Hunchak; 88 Kamar Jorden; 1 Hergy Mayala; 85 Andrés Salgado; 87 Richie Sindani	**Offensive linemen**: 60 Shane Bergman G; 63 Derek Dennis T; 62 Nila Kasitati T; 68 Justin Lawrence C/G; 58 Ryan Sceviour G; 61 Ucambre Williams C/T; **Defensive linemen**: 96 Chris Casher DE; 94 Da'Sean Downey DE; 92 Vincent Desjardins DT; 91 Mike Rose DT; 99 Sterling Sheffield DE; 93 Jabar Westerman DT; 97 Derek Wiggan DT	**Linebackers**: 36 Cory Greenwood; 40 Nate Holley; 52 Riley Jones; 45 Dexter McCoil; 48 Wynton McManis; 33 Eric Mezzalira; **Defensive backs**: 8 DaShaun Amos; 49 Lorenzo Jerome; 16 Royce Metchie; 31 Tre Roberson; 28 Brandon Smith; 11 Courtney Stephen; 29 Jamar Wall; 21 Raheem Wilson	**Special teams**: 54 Pierre-Luc Caron LS; 6 Rob Maver P; 30 René Paredes K; **Practice roster**: 86 Daniel Braverman WR; 66 David Brown G; 37 Evan Foster LB; 65 Jaylan Guthrie G; 50 Leon Johnson T; 81 Michael Klukas WR; 26 Dagogo Maxwell DB; 20 Dwayne Norman LB; 32 Asnnel Robo RB; 67 Zack Williams G	**Injured list**: 17 Markeith Ambles WR; 43 Marcus Ball LB; 82 Juwan Brescacin SB; 35 Ka'Deem Carey RB; 0 Robertson Daniel DB; 53 Brad Erdos G; 24 Jamari Gilbert DB; 95 Anthony Johnson DE/DT; 41 Cordarro Law DE; 3 Ivan McLennan DE; 42 Chase Middleton LB; 2 Romar Morris RB; 27 Jonathan Moxey DB; 98 Ese Mrabure-Ajufo DT; 90 Folarin Orimolade DE; 80 Aaron Peck SB; 4 Eric Rogers SB; 47 Fraser Sopik LB; 7 Junior Turner DT; Italics indicate American player **Bold** indicates Global player Roster updated 2026-05-22; Depth Chart • Transactions

== Coaching staff ==
Calgary Stampeders Staff
Front office: President and coo – Lyle Bauer; General manager – John Hufnagel; Assistant general manager of football operations – Michael Petrie; Director of canadian scouting – Brendan Mahoney; Director of U.S. Scouting – Cole Hufnagel; Head coaches: Head coach – Dave Dickenson; Assistant head coach – Mark Kilam; Offensive coaches: Offensive coordinator – Dave Dickenson; Quarterbacks – Ryan Dinwiddie; Running backs – Marc Mueller; Receivers – Pete Costanza; Offensive line – Pat DelMonaco	Defensive coaches: Defensive coordinator – Brent Monson; Defensive line – Corey Mace; Linebackers – J. C. Sherritt; Defensive backs – Josh Bell; Special teams coaches: Special teams coordinator – Mark Kilam; Strength and conditioning: Strength and conditioning – Taylor Altilio; → Coaching staff
