= Coulter Osborne =

Canadian arbitrator and basketball player (1934–2023)

Coulter Osborne OOnt KC

Integrity Commissioner of Ontario
- In office September 17, 2001 – July 31, 2007
- Preceded by: Gregory Evans
- Succeeded by: Lynn Morrison

Justice of the Court of Appeal for Ontario
- In office 1990–2001

Justice of the High Court of Ontario
- In office 1978–1990

Personal details
- Born: Coulter Arthur Anthony Osborne; April 29, 1934
- Died: April 19, 2023 (aged 88)
- Education: University of Western Ontario; Osgoode Hall Law School
- Listed height: 6 ft 1 in (1.85 m)

Coulter Arthur Anthony Osborne OOnt KC (April 29, 1934 – April 19, 2023) was a Canadian arbitrator who served as Associate Chief Justice of Ontario.

== Early life and education ==
Osborne was raised in Hamilton, Ontario. He attended the University of Western Ontario and graduated in 1955. He played for Western Mustangs football, coached by John P. Metras. In 1959, Osborne graduated from Osgoode Hall Law School.

== Athletic career ==
Prior to his career in law, Osborne represented Canada at the 1956 Summer Olympics in basketball.

== Legal career ==
Osborne was appointed to the Ontario Court of Appeal in 1990 and became Associate Chief Justice in 1999. In 2001 he was appointed Ontario's Integrity Commissioner and also served as Ontario's Lobby Registrar until 2007.

== Honours ==
In 2011, Osborne was appointed to the Order of Ontario.

== Death ==
Osborne died on April 19, 2023, at the age of 88.
