= Alex Berwick =

Canadian gridiron football player (born 2000)

Profile
- Position: Offensive lineman

Personal information
- Born: June 30, 2000 (age 26); Ottawa, Ontario, Canada
- Listed height: 6 ft 2 in (1.88 m)
- Listed weight: 306 lb (139 kg)

Career information
- High school: St. Joseph (Nepean, Ontario)
- University: Western (2019–2024)
- CFL draft: 2025: 7th round, 59th overall pick

Career history
- BC Lions (2025–2026)

Awards and highlights
- Vanier Cup champion (2021); Second-team All-Canadian (2024); First-team OUA All-Star (2024)

Career CFL statistics as of 2026
- Games played: 9
- Stats at CFL.ca

Alex Berwick (born June 30, 2000) is a Canadian professional football offensive lineman. He played U Sports football for the Western Mustangs.

== Early life ==
Berwick was born on June 30, 2000, in Ottawa, Ontario. He attended St. Joseph High School in Nepean, Ontario.

== University career ==
Berwick played U Sports football for the Western Mustangs from 2019 to 2024. He played in 41 games, starting in nine, at centre. Berwick earned first-team Ontario University Athletics All-Star and second-team All-Canadian honors in 2024.

== Professional career ==
Pre-draft measurables
Height	Weight	40-yard dash	20-yard shuttle	Three-cone drill	Vertical jump	Broad jump	Bench press
6 ft 2 1/8 in (1.88 m)	306 lb (139 kg)	5.42 s	4.66 s	8.06 s	24 in (0.61 m)	7 ft 9 3/8 in (2.37 m)	22 reps
All values from CFL Combine

On April 29, 2025, Berwick was selected by the BC Lions with the 59th overall pick in the seventh round of the 2025 CFL draft. On June 1, 2025, Berwick was signed to the practice roster. On July 13, 2025, Berwick was promoted to the Lions' active roster. On August 22, 2025, Berwick was reassigned to the Lions' practice roster. On September 25, 2025, Berwick was again promoted to the Lions' active roster. On September 30, 2025, Berwick was again reassigned to the Lions' practice roster. Berwick dressed in six games as a reserve lineman during the 2025 CFL season, and on November 20, 2025, he was re-signed by the Lions. On May 31, 2026, Berwick was reassigned to the Lions' practice roster. On June 26, Berwick was promoted to the active roster in a depth role in a loss against the Calgary Stampeders.On July 2, 2026, Berwick was reassigned to the Lions' practice roster. On July 29, 2026, Berwick was again promoted to the Lions' active roster for his second game of the season against the Winnipeg Blue Bombers. On August 4, 2026, Berwick was again reassigned to the Lions' practice roster. On October 22, 2026, Berwick was, for the third time that season, promoted to the Lions' active roster. On October 26, 2026, Berwick was again reassigned to the Lions' practice roster ahead of the Western Semi-Final game. On November 8, 2026, Berwick became a free agent as his contract expired at the conclusion of the Lions' season.
