= Western Mustangs football =

Canadian university gridiron football team

Western Mustangs
- First season: 1929; 97 years ago
- Athletic director: Christine Stapleton
- Head coach: Michael Faulds; 1st year, –
- Other staff: Paul Gleason (DC), Kevin MacNeil (RC), Jacob Kirk (VC)
- Home stadium: Western Alumni Stadium
- Year built: 2000
- Stadium capacity: 7,800
- Stadium surface: Sporturf
- Location: London, Ontario
- League: U Sports
- Conference: OUA (1980-present)
- Past associations: CIRFU (1929-1970); OUAA (1971-1973); OQIFC (1974-1979)
- All-time record: –
- Postseason record: –

Titles
- Vanier Cups: 8; 1971, 1974, 1976, 1977, 1989, 1994, 2017, 2021
- Uteck Bowls: 1; 2017
- Mitchell Bowls: 4; 2008, 2018, 2021, 2026
- Churchill Bowls: 7; 1959, 1974, 1976, 1977, 1979, 1982, 1994
- Atlantic Bowls: 5; 1971, 1985, 1986, 1989, 1995
- Canadian Bowls: 1; 1914
- Yates Cups: 36; 1931, 1939, 1946, 1947, 1949, 1950, 1952, 1953, 1957, 1959, 1971, 1974, 1976, 1977, 1979, 1980, 1981, 1982, 1985, 1986, 1988, 1989, 1990, 1994, 1995, 1998, 2007, 2008, 2010, 2013, 2017, 2018, 2021, 2022, 2023, 2026
- Hec Crighton winners: 7 Jamie Bone, Greg Marshall, Blake Marshall, Tim Tindale (2), Andy Fantuz, Chris Merchant
- Colours: Purple and white
- Fight song: "Western"
- Mascot: J.W.
- Outfitter: Under Armour
- Website: westernmustangs.ca/football

The Western Mustangs football team (also known as the Western Ontario Mustangs) represents the University of Western Ontario in Canadian university football. The Mustangs compete as a member of the Ontario University Athletics (OUA), under the U Sports association.

With their first full season in 1929, the Western Mustangs are one of the most decorated football teams in Canadian university history. The team has had the most Vanier Cup national championship appearances, having made it to the title game 15 times (most recently in 2021). The Mustangs have won eight Vanier Cups, second only to the Laval Rouge et Or. The Mustangs have also won the Yates Cup conference championship 35 times in team history; more than any other Canadian University. The Western Mustangs play their home games at Western Alumni Stadium, located on the south side of campus. With 8,000 seats, Western Alumni Stadium is the second-largest stadium in the OUA association.

There have been three former Western Mustang team members who have participated in the NFL draft: John Priestner (Baltimore Colts, 1979), Tyrone Williams (Phoenix Cardinals, 1992) and Vaughn Martin (San Diego Chargers, 2009).

== History ==
=== Early development ===
One of the earliest known football games to have been played at Western was in 1908 by a group of medical students. Known as 'rugby' or 'rugby football', this team joined a local junior league and played a small series of games that year. In 1912, the Medical faculty students as well as the Arts faculty students joined and formed one team which played along with the local City of London team in the Junior Ontario Rugby Union.

Western joined the intermediate intercollegiate football team in 1920 and with a very rough start, the team persevered with the support of the university for the next couple of seasons. With improved coaching from 1923 to 1926, the team went on to win their first intermediate intercollegiate championship in 1927 with Art Wilson as the head coach.

==== J. W. Little Memorial Stadium ====
In 1928, construction began on the first stadium on campus. With the help of Fielding Yost, the stadium was built to proper football guidelines. The J. W. Little Memorial Stadium opened the following year on October 19, 1929, and was named after Colonel J.W. Little, a former City of London mayor. Opening day, Western's new senior intermediate team played Queen's University and lost 25–2.

Improvements like an electronic scoreboard and a radio booth were added in 1948 and 1949, respectively. By 1960, the stadium expanded seating from the original 5,000 seats to well over 7,200 seats. This was then expanded to 8,000 in future years.

The stadium held its last game in 1999, and the new TD Stadium was built in 2000.

=== Senior Intermediate Team ===
The entry into the senior intercollegiate league in 1929 brought Western into the spotlight. Joe Breen became the head coach for the Senior Intermediate Team this year, with assistant coach Mitt Burt and Paul Hauch as captain. 1929 was the first year Western played senior football.

The Mustangs continued to play in league throughout the early 1930s, but had a mixed bag of wins and losses, but did win their first Yates Cup championship in 1931. By 1935, Breen retired as the head coach and Western football got a jumpstart when Bill Storen and John P. Metras came on as head coach and assistant coach this same year. Both coaches were very knowledgeable and skillful football players and with their guidance, the team gained more and more wins each year. By 1939, the team accomplished their first undefeated season, notably with Joe Krol as a member of this historic team.

During 1938, J. Howard Crocker felt that it was unfair to the students and faculty to lengthen the football season beyond intercollegiate competition, and declared that the football team would not compete for the national championship in 1938, if it won the intercollegiate title. Crocker went ahead with plans for the football team during World War II, despite that no decision had been made whether the Canadian Interuniversity Athletics Union would operate. When intercollegiate football collapsed due to the war, Crocker considered placing the football team in the Ontario Rugby Football Union, but it was impossible to agree on a schedule due to military requirements on the training of physically fit students. Instead of being members of any football league, Crocker invited Ontario Rugby Football Union teams to play exhibition games at the university.

Metras took over as head coach in 1940, but with the beginning of World War II, the Canadian Intercollegiate Athletic Union had suspended all athletic activities from 1940 to 1945. This decision was met with mixed reviews. It was at this time that Metras chose to play the Western senior team under the organization of Western's Canadian Officers' Training Corps (COTC). Known as the COTC Mustangs, they played in both Canada and American service and college teams.

=== After WWII into the 1950s ===
Canadian intercollegiate athletics resumed in 1946, and the Mustangs saw another undefeated schedule season that year, winning their third Yates Cup. Some notable players this year were Bob McFarlane, Don McFarlane, George Curtis, and quarterback Herb Ballantyne.

By 1948, the team was attracting thousands of fans for every game and the CP Rail would run special trains to help accommodate getting the team, band, and fans to and from away games. Videotaping, electronic score boards, and radio broadcasting were all brought to the games starting in the 1948 season.

Into the 1950s, the Mustangs continued the excellent playing and Metras continued as the head coach. The local newspaper, the London Free Press, was diligently attending and recording all the games the Mustangs played. Western football became a part of the London community and not just the student body. In 1950, the Mustangs defeated the Toronto Varsity Blues at Varsity Stadium 8–1 with over 27,000 spectators, winning their 6th Yates Cup championship.

The next couple of seasons saw players like Don Getty, Murray Henderson, Bill Britton, John Girvin, Frank Cosentino, and Ed Meads all play for the Mustangs. The Western Mustangs went on to win five Yates Cups in the 1950s.

=== League expansion ===
By the 1960s, the Senior Intercollegiate league changed its name to the Ontario-Quebec Athletic Association and the Canadian Intercollegiate Athletic Union started to include more Canadian universities. Prior to this, Western only played three other teams in their regular season; Queen's, Toronto, and McGill. With this change, Western also started to play McMaster, Waterloo, Wilfrid Laurier and Windsor in this new group.

=== 1960s ===
The Mustangs saw more difficult times in the 1960s. The first early seasons of the decade saw good highlights, such as an 85-yard touchdown by John Wydareny in 1960 and a 99-yard touchdown by Whit Tucker in 1961. The team lost their steam in 1963 with a 3–3 record. With some disappointing losses, the Mustangs did not win a single Yates Cup during this decade. Metras retired as the football coach in 1969, but stayed on as the director of athletics for Western.

== Coaching history ==
Former head coach Larry Haylor led the team from 1984 until his retirement in 2006, and held the Canadian Interuniversity Sport record for most wins as head coach.

Greg Marshall was hired as head coach beginning with the 2007 season. Marshall won the Hec Crighton Trophy for most outstanding player in U Sports football as a player for the Mustangs in 1980 and also coached professional football for the Hamilton Tiger-Cats from 2004 to 2006. In the 18 seasons that Marshall served as the Mustangs head coach, the team won the Yates Cup seven times, in 2007, 2008, 2010, 2013, 2017, 2018, 2021, 2022 and 2023, and two Vanier Cup in 2017 and 2021. Upon announcing his retirement following the 2025 season, Marshall finished his tenure with a 124–18 record in the regular season.

On January 5, 2026, it was announced that former Western quarterback and Wilfrid Laurier head coach Michael Faulds had been hired as the head coach for the Mustangs.

=== List of head coaches ===
Name	Years	Notes
Joe Breen	1929–1934	
Bill Storen	1935–1939	
John P. Metras	1940–1969	
Frank Cosentino	1970–1974	National championship (Vanier Cup in 1971 & 1974)
Darwin Semotiuk	1975–1984	National championship (Vanier Cup in 1976 & 1977)
Larry Haylor	1984–2006	National championship (Vanier Cup in 1989 & 1994)
Greg Marshall	2007–2025	National championship (Vanier Cup in 2017 & 2021)
Michael Faulds	2026–present	

== Season-by-season records ==
The following is the record of the University of Western Ontario Mustangs football team since 2002:

Season	Games	Won	Lost	Pct %	PF	PA	Standing	Playoffs
2002	8	6	2	0.750	371	213	3rd in OUA	Defeated Windsor Lancers in quarter-final 65–10; Lost to Queen's Golden Gaels in semi-final 55–20
2003	8	5	3	0.625	306	257	2nd in OUA	Lost to Windsor Lancers in quarter-final 21–18
2004	8	6	2	0.750	370	189	3rd in OUA	Defeated York Lions in quarter-final 54–18; Lost to McMaster Marauders in semi-final 40–23
2005	8	6	2	0.625	371	144	2nd in OUA	Defeated Ottawa Gee-Gees in semi-final 18–10; Lost to Laurier Golden Hawks in Yates Cup 29–11
2006	8	5	3	0.625	205	179	5th in OUA	Defeated Windsor Lancers in quarter-final 20–16; Lost to Laurier Golden Hawks in semi-final 20–15
2007	8	4	4	0.500	223	127	5th in OUA	Defeated Queen's Golden Gaels in quarter-final 27–19; Defeated Ottawa Gee-Gees in semi-final 23–16; Defeated Guelph Gryphons in Yates Cup final 34–21; Lost to Manitoba Bisons in Mitchell Bowl 52–20
2008	8	7	1	0.875	363	133	1st in OUA	Defeated Laurier Golden Hawks in semi-final 36–28; Defeated Ottawa Gee-Gees in Yates Cup final 31–17; Defeated Saint Mary's Huskies in Mitchell Bowl 28–12; Lost to Laval Rouge et Or in 44th Vanier Cup 44–21
2009	8	6	2	0.750	335	145	3rd in OUA	Defeated Guelph Gryphons in quarter-final 37–18; Defeated Laurier Golden Hawks in semi-final 26–16; Lost to Queen's Golden Gaels in Yates Cup final 43–39
2010	8	7	1	0.875	317	96	2nd in OUA	Defeated McMaster Marauders in semi-final 34–28; Defeated Ottawa Gee-Gees in Yates Cup final 26–25; Lost to Laval Rouge et Or in Uteck Bowl 13–11
2011	8	7	1	0.875	311	182	1st in OUA	Defeated Windsor Lancers in semi-final 33–27; Lost to McMaster Marauders in Yates Cup final 41–19
2012	8	5	3	0.625	327	165	4th in OUA	Defeated Windsor Lancers in quarter-final 56–35; Lost to McMaster Marauders in semi-final 42–28
2013	8	8	0	1.000	458	148	1st in OUA	Defeated McMaster Marauders in semi final 32–3; Defeated Queen's Golden Gaels in Yates Cup final 51–22; Lost to Calgary Dinos 44–3 in Mitchell Bowl
2014	8	6	2	0.750	415	152	3rd in OUA	Defeated Laurier Golden Hawks in quarter-final 25–10; Lost to Guelph Gryphons in semi-final 51–26
2015	8	8	0	1.000	344	93	1st in OUA	Defeated Laurier Golden Hawks in semi-final 32–18; Lost to Guelph Gryphons in Yates Cup 23–17
2016	8	7	1	0.875	393	148	1st in OUA	Defeated Carleton Ravens in semi-final 51–24; Lost to Laurier Golden Hawks in Yates Cup 43–40
2017	8	8	0	1.000	386	105	1st in OUA	Defeated Guelph Gryphons in semi-final 66–12; Defeated Laurier Golden Hawks in Yates Cup 75–32; Defeated Acadia Axemen in Uteck bowl 81–3; Defeated Laval Rouge et Or in 53rd Vanier Cup 39-17
2018	8	8	0	1.000	384	89	1st in OUA	Defeated Carleton Ravens in semi-final 39–13; Defeated Guelph Gryphons in Yates Cup 63–14; Defeated Saskatchewan Huskies in Mitchell Bowl 47–24; Lost to Laval Rouge et Or in 54th Vanier Cup 34–20
2019	8	8	0	1.000	290	175	1st in OUA	Defeated Waterloo Warriors in semi-final 30–24; Lost to McMaster Marauders in Yates Cup 29–15
2020	Season cancelled due to COVID-19 pandemic							
2021	6	5	1	0.833	266	68	1st in OUA West	Defeated Waterloo Warriors in quarter-final 51–24; Defeated Guelph Gryphons in semi-final 33–12; Defeated Queen's Gaels in Yates Cup final 29–0; Defeated St. Francis Xavier X-Men in Mitchell Bowl 61–6; Defeated Saskatchewan Huskies in 56th Vanier Cup 27-21
2022	8	8	0	1.000	360	115	1st in OUA	Defeated Laurier Golden Hawks in semi-final 45–9; Defeated Queen's Gaels in Yates Cup final 44–16; Lost to Laval Rouge et Or in Mitchell Bowl 27–20
2023	8	8	0	1.000	350	151	1st in OUA	Defeated Queen's Gaels in semi final 47–20; Defeated Laurier Golden Hawks in Yates Cup final 29–14; Lost to Montreal Carabins in Uteck Bowl 29–3
2024	8	7	1	0.875	396	129	2nd in OUA	Defeated McMaster Marauders in quarter-final 46–10; Defeated Guelph Gryphons in semi-final 30–19; Lost to Laurier Golden Hawks in Yates Cup final 51–31
2025	8	7	1	0.875	361	246	2nd in OUA	Lost to Guelph Gryphons in quarter-final 18–17
2026	8	6	2	0.750	370	202	2nd in OUA	Defeated Laurier Golden Hawks in quarter-final 58–41; Defeated Windsor Lancers in semi-final 43–33; Defeated Queen's Gaels in Yates Cup final 36–27; Defeated Saint Mary's Huskies in Mitchell Bowl 64–14; Play against Montreal Carabins in 61st Vanier Cup

== National postseason results ==
Vanier Cup Era (1965–current)
Year	Game	Opponent	Result
1971	Atlantic Bowl; Vanier Cup	Saint Mary's; Alberta	W 44–13; W 15–14
1974	Churchill Bowl; Vanier Cup	Saskatchewan; Toronto	W 41–17; W 19–15
1976	Churchill Bowl; Vanier Cup	UBC; Acadia	W 30–8; W 29–13
1977	Churchill Bowl; Vanier Cup	Calgary; Acadia	W 24–22; W 48–15
1979	Churchill Bowl; Vanier Cup	Queen's; Acadia	W 32–14; L 12–34
1980	Churchill Bowl	Alberta	L 4–14
1981	Churchill Bowl	Alberta	L 31–32
1982	Churchill Bowl; Vanier Cup	Concordia; UBC	W 17–7; L 14–39
1985	Atlantic Bowl; Vanier Cup	Mount Allison; Calgary	W 34–3; L 6–25
1986	Atlantic Bowl; Vanier Cup	Acadia; UBC	W 29–22; L 23–25
1988	Churchill Bowl	Calgary	L 15–34
1989	Atlantic Bowl; Vanier Cup	Saint Mary's; Saskatchewan	W 38–33; W 35–10
1990	Atlantic Bowl	Saint Mary's	L 30–31
1994	Churchill Bowl; Vanier Cup	Bishop's; Saskatchewan	W 41–24; W 50–40
1995	Atlantic Bowl; Vanier Cup	Acadia; Calgary	W 55–45; L 24–54
1998	Churchill Bowl	Saskatchewan	L 17–33
2007	Mitchell Bowl	Manitoba	L 20–52
2008	Mitchell Bowl; Vanier Cup	Saint Mary's; Laval	W 28–12; L 21–44
2010	Uteck Bowl	Laval	L 11–13
2013	Mitchell Bowl	Calgary	L 3–44
2017	Uteck Bowl; Vanier Cup	Acadia; Laval	W 81–3; W 39–17
2018	Mitchell Bowl; Vanier Cup	Saskatchewan; Laval	W 47–24; L 20–34
2021	Mitchell Bowl; Vanier Cup	St FX; Saskatchewan	W 61–6; W 27–21
2022	Mitchell Bowl	Laval	L 20–27
2023	Uteck Bowl	Montreal	L 3–29
2026	Mitchell Bowl; Vanier Cup	Saint Mary's; Montreal	W 64–14; TBD

Western is 16–10 in national semi-final games and 8–7 in the Vanier Cup.

== National award winners ==
- Hec Crighton Trophy: Jamie Bone (1978), Greg Marshall (1980), Blake Marshall (1986), Tim Tindale (1991, 1993), Andy Fantuz (2005), Chris Merchant (2019)
- J. P. Metras Trophy: Pierre Vercheval (1987), Deionte Knight (2021), Erik Andersen (2025)
- Presidents' Trophy: Brent Lewis (1987), Derek Krete (1996), Pawel Kruba (2013), Fraser Sopik (2018)
- Peter Gorman Trophy: Sean Reade (1992), Andrew Fantuz (2002), Tyler Varga (2011)
- Russ Jackson Award: Nick Vanin (2017), Mackenzie Ferguson (2018)
- Frank Tindall Trophy: Frank Cosentino (1970), Darwin Semotiuk (1976), Larry Haylor (1990, 1998), Greg Marshall (2018, 2019)
- Lois and Doug Mitchell Award: Tim Tindale (1993)

== Western Mustangs in the CFL ==
As of the start of the 2026 CFL season, ten former Mustangs players were on CFL teams' rosters:

- Erik Andersen, Saskatchewan Roughriders
- Alex Berwick, BC Lions
- Jackson Findlay, BC Lions
- Zack Fry, Saskatchewan Roughriders
- Lirim Hajrullahu, Toronto Argonauts
- Marc Liegghio, Hamilton Tiger-Cats
- Riley MacLeod, Montreal Alouettes
- Keegan O'Neil, Toronto Argonauts
- Robert Panabaker, Hamilton Tiger-Cats
- Keanu Yazbeck, Montreal Alouettes
