= Riley MacLeod =

Canadian football player (born 2002)

- MacLeod with the Montreal Alouettes in 2026

No. 41 – Montreal Alouettes
- Position: Linebacker
- Roster status: Practice roster
- CFL status: National

Personal information
- Born: October 23, 2002 (age 24); Hamilton, Ontario, Canada
- Listed height: 6 ft 1 in (1.85 m)
- Listed weight: 238 lb (108 kg)

Career information
- High school: St. Thomas More
- University: Western (2021–2024)
- CFL draft: 2025: 8th round, 70th overall pick

Career history
- Montreal Alouettes (2025–present)

Awards and highlights
- Vanier Cup champion (2021)
- Stats at CFL.ca

Riley MacLeod (born October 23, 2002) is a Canadian professional football linebacker for the Montreal Alouettes of the Canadian Football League (CFL). He played U Sports football for the Western Mustangs.

== U Sports career ==
MacLeod played U Sports football for the Western Mustangs from 2021 to 2024. He played in 43 games, recording 236 tackles, including 11 for loss, six sacks, one interceptions, two pass deflections, two forced fumbles and one fumble recovery. MacLeod was a member of the Mustangs when they won the 56th Vanier Cup over the Saskatchewan Huskies.

== Professional career ==
Pre-draft measurables
Height	Weight	40-yard dash	20-yard shuttle	Three-cone drill	Vertical jump	Broad jump	Bench press
6 ft 1 1/8 in (1.86 m)	228 lb (103 kg)	5.03 s	4.21 s	6.82 s	34.5 in (0.88 m)	10 ft 0 1/2 in (3.06 m)	18 reps
All values from CFL Combine

MacLeod was selected in the eighth round with the 70th pick of the 2025 CFL draft by the Montreal Alouettes. On May 7, 2025, he officially signed with the Alouettes. MacLeod made his CFL debut on July 25, 2025, against the Calgary Stampeders but made his first tackle on September 26, also against the Stampeders.
