= Sheri Forde =

Canadian television sportscaster

Sheri Forde (born Sheri Hargrave; June 18, 1968) is a Canadian reporter on Sportsnet Tonight, and formerly of The Sports Network (TSN), based in Toronto, Ontario. She has reported on the various Toronto sports teams. Forde joined TSN in 1998 from Calgary, Alberta. She moved to Toronto in 2002 to work for CFTO then went back to TSN in 2003. Originally from Brooks, Alberta, Forde has been working in the media since 1987. On November 17, 2015, her role at TSN was eliminated as a part of restructuring effort.

Sheri authored a first person account of the racist incidents she, her colleagues and her family have experienced as a mixed race couple.

Sheri is married to Duane Forde who works for TSN as a Canadian football colour analyst.
