= Chris Casher =

American gridiron football player (born 1993)

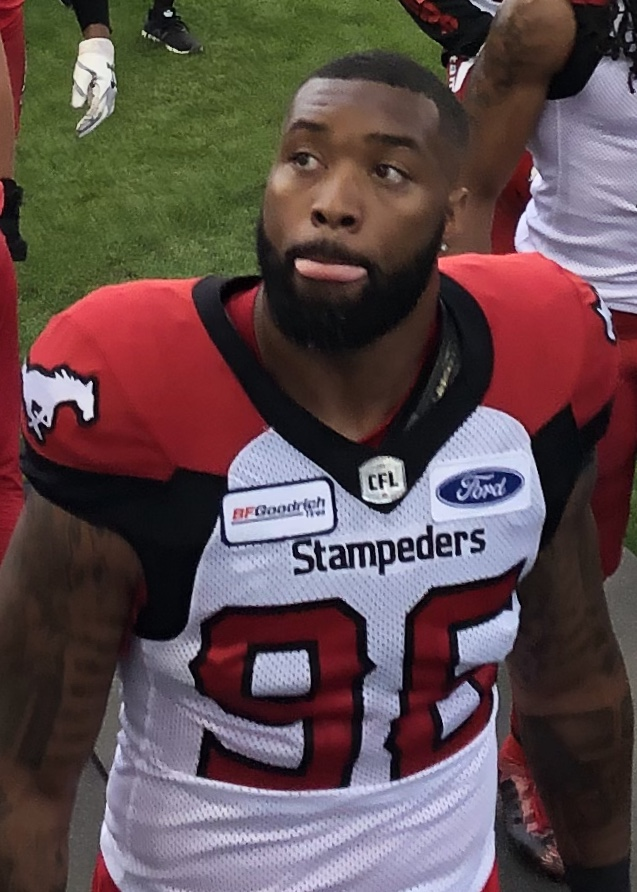
- Casher with the Calgary Stampeders in 2019

No. 96
- Position: Defensive lineman

Personal information
- Born: December 30, 1993 (age 32); Mobile, Alabama, U.S.
- Listed height: 6 ft 4 in (1.93 m)
- Listed weight: 257 lb (117 kg)

Career information
- College: Florida State; Faulkner
- NFL draft: 2017: undrafted

Career history
- 2017: Oakland Raiders*
- 2017: New York Giants*
- 2017–2018: Winnipeg Blue Bombers*
- 2018–2019: Calgary Stampeders
- 2020: BC Lions
- 2021: Edmonton Elks
- * Offseason or practice squad member only

Awards and highlights
- Grey Cup champion (2018); BCS national champion (2014)
- Stats at CFL.ca

Chris Casher (born December 30, 1993) is an American former professional football defensive lineman who played in the Canadian Football League (CFL). He played college football for the Florida State Seminoles and the Faulkner Eagles.

== College career ==
Casher played college football with the Florida State from 2012 to 2015 where he was a member of the 2014 BCS National Championship team. He left Florida State after 2015 and played his senior season with the Faulkner Eagles in 2016.

== Professional career ==
=== Oakland Raiders ===
After going undrafted in the 2017 NFL draft, Casher signed with the Oakland Raiders on May 8, 2017. He was released by the Raiders on August 4, 2017.

=== New York Giants ===
On August 14, 2017, Casher signed with the New York Giants. He played in three preseason games and was part of the team's final releases on September 1, 2017.

=== Winnipeg Blue Bombers ===
Casher signed a practice roster agreement with the Winnipeg Blue Bombers on October 24, 2017 for the last few games of the season and signed a futures contract with the team for 2018. He attended training camp with the Blue Bombers in 2018, but was part of the final cuts on June 9, 2018.

=== Calgary Stampeders ===
On September 11, 2018, Casher signed a practice roster agreement with the Calgary Stampeders. He spent the rest of the season on the practice roster until the last game of the regular season where he was placed on the injured roster. He was on the practice roster when the Stampeders won the 106th Grey Cup. He then re-signed with the Stampeders to a one-year contract on December 10, 2018.

Casher had a breakout year in 2019 as he played in 16 regular season games where he recorded 34 defensive tackles, seven sacks, and one forced fumble. He played in his first career regular season game on June 29, 2019 against the BC Lions and had his first two sacks in the next game on July 6, 2019 against the Saskatchewan Roughriders. He also played in the team's West Semi-Final loss to the Winnipeg Blue Bombers.

=== BC Lions ===
On February 11, 2020, Casher signed a one-year contract with the BC Lions. However, he did not play in 2020 due to the cancellation of the 2020 CFL season, so he re-signed with the Lions on February 2, 2021. However, he was cut at the end of training camp and was released on July 27, 2021.

=== Edmonton Elks ===
On September 28, 2021, Casher was signed by the Edmonton Elks and was moved from the suspended list to the practice roster on October 11, 2021. He played in two games for the Elks in 2021 and was released on December 28, 2021.
