= Fraser Sopik =

Canadian gridiron football player (born 1997)

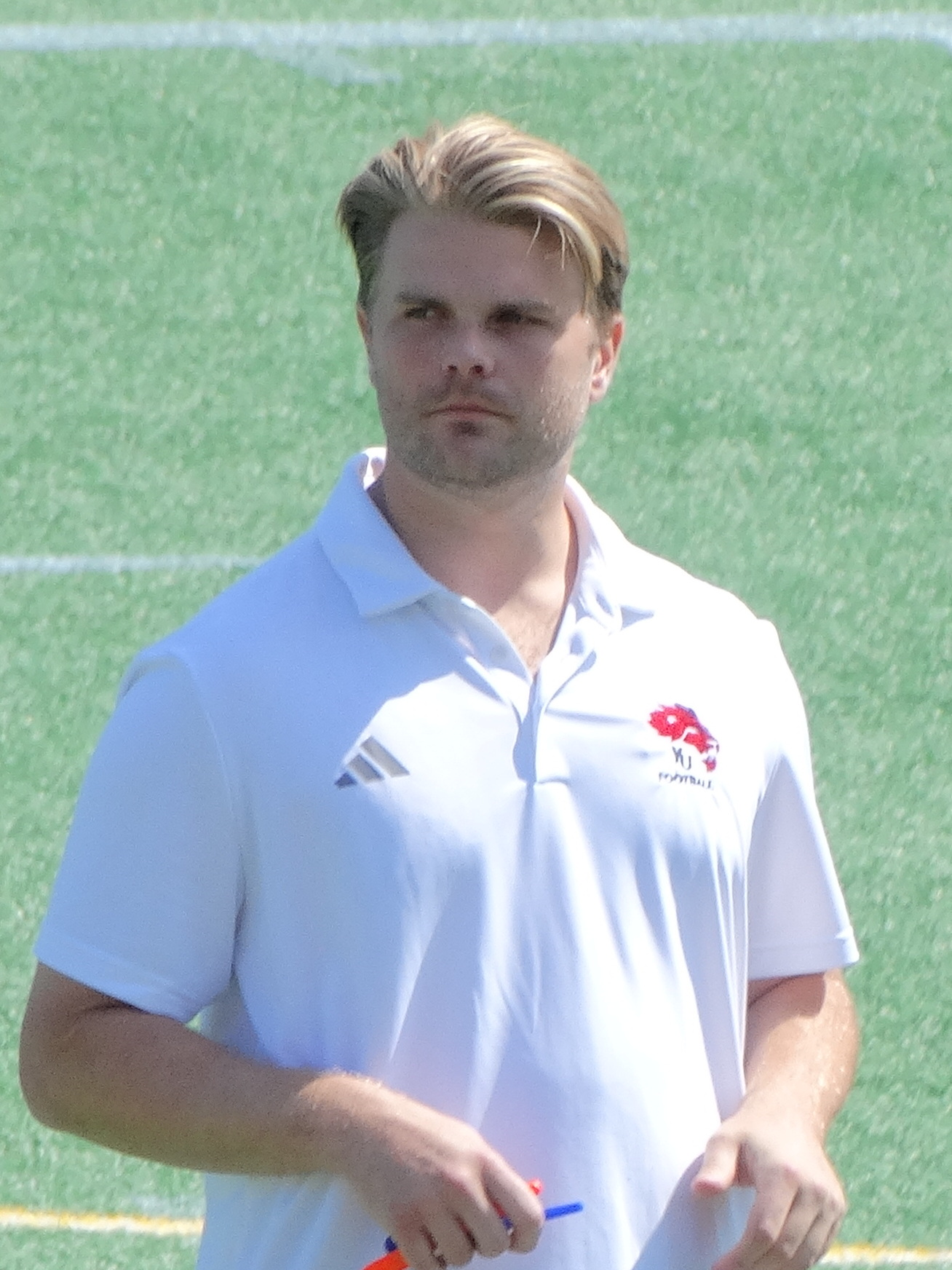
- Sopik with the York Lions in 2026

York Lions
- Title: Special teams coordinator
- CFL status: National

Personal information
- Born: April 3, 1997 (age 29); Toronto, Ontario, Canada
- Listed height: 6 ft 0 in (1.83 m)
- Listed weight: 194 lb (88 kg)

Career information
- Position: Linebacker
- High school: St. Andrew's College
- University: Western
- CFL draft: 2019: 4th round, 31st overall pick

Career history

Playing
- 2019–2022: Calgary Stampeders
- 2023: Hamilton Tiger-Cats
- 2024: Toronto Argonauts
- 2025: Calgary Stampeders*
- * Offseason or practice squad member only

Coaching
- 2025: Toronto Argonauts (Defensive assistant)
- 2026–present: York Lions (Special teams coordinator)

Awards and highlights
- Grey Cup champion (2024); Vanier Cup champion (2017); Bruce Coulter Award (2017); Presidents' Trophy (2018)
- Stats at CFL.ca

Fraser Sopik (born April 3, 1997) is a Canadian former professional football linebacker and is the special teams coordinator for the York Lions of U Sports football. He played in five seasons in the Canadian Football League (CFL) and is a Grey Cup champion after winning with the Toronto Argonauts in 2024. He also won a Vanier Cup championship with the Western Mustangs in 2017.

== University career ==
Sopik played U Sports football for the Western Mustangs from 2015 to 2018. He won the Bruce Coulter Award in 2017 as the most valuable defensive player in Western's Vanier Cup win that year. He also won the Presidents' Trophy in his final year with Western in 2018.

== Professional career ==
Pre-draft measurables
Height	Weight	40-yard dash	20-yard shuttle	Three-cone drill	Vertical jump	Broad jump	Bench press
5 ft 11 7/8 in (1.83 m)	194 lb (88 kg)	4.79 s	4.37 s	7.38 s	29.5 in (0.75 m)	9 ft 3 1/4 in (2.83 m)	10 reps
All values from CFL Combine

=== Calgary Stampeders (first stint) ===
Sopik was drafted in the fourth round, 31st overall, by the Stampeders in the 2018 CFL draft and signed with the team to a two-year contract on May 13, 2019. He played in his first professional game in the team's 2019 season opener on June 15, 2019 against the Ottawa Redblacks where he had one defensive tackle and one special teams tackle. He later recorded his first career sack on July 6, 2019 against Cody Fajardo of the Saskatchewan Roughriders in a game where he also had a season-high four defensive tackles. In his rookie year, he dressed in all 18 regular season games where he recorded 13 defensive tackles, 10 special teams tackles, two sacks, two forced fumbles, and a blocked punt.

Sopik did not play in 2020 due to the cancellation of the 2020 CFL season. On January 11, 2021, he avoided free agency and signed a contract extension with the Stampeders. In 2021, he played in all 14 regular season games where he had four defensive tackles and 13 special teams tackles. In 2022, he played in 12 games and recorded 14 defensive tackles, seven special teams tackles, two sacks, and one forced fumble. He became a free agent upon the expiry of his contract on February 14, 2023.

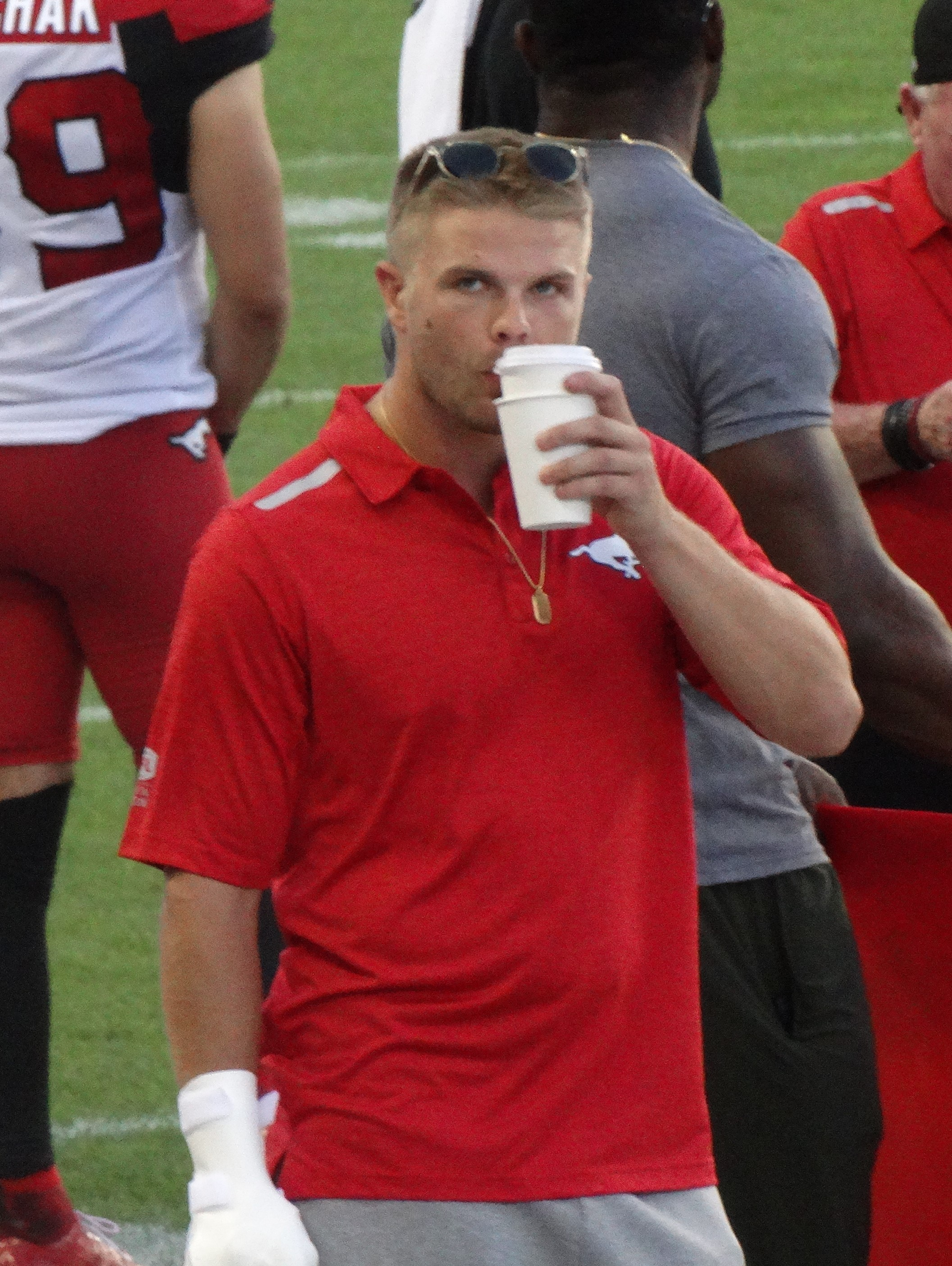
Sopik with the Calgary Stampeders in 2022

=== Hamilton Tiger-Cats ===
On February 15, 2023, it was announced that Sopik had signed with the Hamilton Tiger-Cats. He played in 12 regular season games where he had two defensive tackles, nine special teams tackles, and one fumble recovery. He became a free agent on February 13, 2024.

=== Toronto Argonauts ===
On February 13, 2024, it was announced that Sopik had signed with the Toronto Argonauts. In the 2024 season, he played in 15 regular season games, starting in 12, as he sat out the last three games due to injury. He finished third on the team in defensive plays made as he recorded 57 defensive tackles, six special teams tackles, one sack, one forced fumble, two fumble recoveries, and three pass knockdowns. He sat out for the East Semi-Final due to injury, but returned for the East Final victory over the Montreal Alouettes. Sopik also played in his first Grey Cup game where he had one special teams tackle and one forced fumble in the Argonauts' 41–24 victory over the Winnipeg Blue Bombers in the 111th Grey Cup. He became a free agent upon the expiry of his contract on February 11, 2025.

=== Calgary Stampeders (second stint) ===
On February 11, 2025, it was announced that Sopik had signed with the Stampeders. However, he announced his retirement on May 7, 2025, after suffering an injury in the off-season.

== Coaching career ==
=== Toronto Argonauts ===
Sopik joined the Toronto Argonauts in 2025 as a defensive assistant.

=== York Lions ===
On May 28, 2026, it was announced that Sopik had been hired by the York Lions as the team's special teams coordinator.
