= Gregory Evans (judge) =

Canadian judge (1913–2010)

Gregory Evans CM OOnt QC

Integrity Commissioner of Ontario
- In office March 5, 2001 – September 16, 2001
- Preceded by: Robert C. Rutherford
- Succeeded by: Coulter A. A. Osborne
- In office June 29, 1988 – November 30, 1997
- Succeeded by: Robert C. Rutherford

Personal details
- Born: Gregory Thomas Evans; June 13, 1913 McAdam, New Brunswick
- Died: May 23, 2010 (aged 96) Orillia, Ontario
- Education: Saint Joseph's University; Osgoode Hall Law School
- Occupation: Judge

Gregory Thomas Evans, CM OOnt QC (June 13, 1913 – May 23, 2010) was a Canadian judge and the first Integrity Commissioner of Ontario.

Born in McAdam, New Brunswick, he received a Bachelor of Arts degree from Saint Joseph's University in 1934 and graduated from Osgoode Hall Law School in 1939. He was called to the Bar of Ontario in 1939 and was created a Queen's Counsel in 1953. A practising lawyer, he was appointed a Justice of the Court of Appeal for Ontario in 1965. From 1976 to 1985, he was the Chief Justice of the High Court of Ontario.

From 1962 to 1963, he served as President of the Canadian Bar Association-Ontario (now the Ontario Bar Association).

In 1988, he was appointed Integrity Commissioner of Ontario. He served until 1997 and again for a brief period in 2001.

== Honours ==
In 1999, he was awarded the Order of Ontario. In 2000, he was made a Member of the Order of Canada.
