= Integrity Commissioner =

- Bureau du commissaire à l’intégrité

Office overview
- Formed: 1988
- Headquarters: 2 Bloor St. W., Suite 2100; Toronto, Ontario
- Office executive: J. David Wake, Commissioner
- Website: oico.on.ca

The Integrity Commissioner (French: Bureau du commissaire à l’intégrité) for the province of Ontario is the officer of the Legislative Assembly of Ontario responsible for preventing and responding to ethics violations before they occur for members of the Legislative Assembly.

== Overview ==
The position was created by the province in 1988 with the passing of the Conflict of Interest Act (replaced by Members' Integrity Act, 1994) in 1988. The headquarters for the office is located in Toronto at 2 Bloor Street West.

The office has other legislation that assists in its mandate to govern the actions of the members of the Legislative Assembly:

- Lobbyists Registration Act, 1999
- Cabinet Ministers and Opposition Leaders Expenses Review and Accountability Act, 2002
- Public Service of Ontario Act, 2006
- Public Sector Expenses Review Act, 2009

== Integrity Commissioners ==
- Gregory T. Evans (June 29, 1988 – November 30, 1997)
- Robert C. Rutherford (December 1, 1997 – March 4, 2001)
- Gregory T. Evans (2nd term: March 5, 2001 – September 16, 2001)
- Coulter Osborne (September 17, 2001 – July 31, 2007)
- Lynn Morrison (August 1, 2007 – December 31, 2015)
- J. David Wake (January 1, 2016 – present)

== Case summaries ==
Year	Allegations	Findings by Integrity Commissioner	Other comments by Integrity Commissioner
2009-2010	Conflict of interest related to hiring	No conflict of interest found.	
2009-2010	Meeting quality standards - gross mismanagement and grave danger regarding service delivery	No gross mismanagement.	
2010-2011	Grave danger and gross mismanagement in relation to a regulatory matter	No grave danger.	
2010-2011	Wrongdoing in relation to a regulatory process	Lack of policy clarity and failure of the ministry to oversee the unit's activities in relation to the issue resulted in inconsistent application of the regulatory program.	
2010-2011	Theft	No theft detected	Procedural weaknesses in the processes identified
2010-2011	Conflict of interest allegation in relation to hiring	No wrongdoing	Reasonable basis to give rise to a perception that conflict of interest had occurred.
2011-2012	Gross mismanagement and grave danger to the life, health and/or safety of a person	No wrongdoing.	
2011-2012	Improper investigation	Insufficient basis for investigation.	
2011-2012	Improper conduct	No improper conduct found.	Lack of policy clarity within the Ministry
2011-2012	Manipulation of attendance figures	No wrongdoing as allegation were not substantiated.	
2012-2013	Gross mismanagement and conflict of interest in relation to procurement	No gross mismanagement or conflicts of interest.	There were serious issues with the procurement practices.
2012-2013	Conflict of Interest	No contravention of the conflict of interest rules.	
2013-2014	Gross mismanagement due to improper influence by a stakeholder over public servant staffing	No gross mismanagement.	
2013-2014	Criminal use of a computer	No use of work computer for any improper purpose.	
2013-2014	Gross mismanagement for management's failure to address bullying and harassment in a particular work unit, and preferential treatment of a vendor	No gross mismanagement.	
2013-2014	Conflict of interest and gross mismanagement	No wrongdoing or any improper conduct found	
2013-2014	Cover up of loss of evidence held pursuant to court order	No wrongdoing as prior investigation and corrective actions had already been taken.	Commissioner recommended additional corrective action including: informing the court and the parties about the loss of evidence, informing police authorities of the circumstances, and conducting a further investigation relating to the conduct of another individual.
2014-2015	Conflict of interest and gross mismanagement related to procurement	No wrongdoing.	Deficiencies with overall procurement practices
2014-2015	Interference of a licensing decision	No wrongdoing.	
2015-2016	Conflict of interest	No wrongdoing.	Integrity Commissioner did not investigate.
2015-2016	Gross mismanagement - Improper use of Ministry resources	No wrongdoing.	
2015-2016	Gross mismanagement - Acting in a manner contrary to acceptable practices, failing to report an incident and counselling another public servant to engage in wrongdoing.	Wrongdoing found.	
2015-2016	Conflict of interest	No wrongdoing.	
2015-2016	Conflict of interest	No wrongdoing.	No investigation by Integrity Commissioner.
