= 30th Vanier Cup =

1994 Canadian university football championship

Saskatchewan Huskies	Western Mustangs
(6–2)	(7–0)
40	50
Head coach: Brian Towriss	Head coach: Larry Haylor
	1	2	3	4	OT	Total
Saskatchewan Huskies	7	0	7	23	3	40
Western Mustangs	21	3	7	6	13	50
- Date: November 19, 1994
- Stadium: SkyDome
- Location: Toronto
- Ted Morris Memorial Trophy: Brent Schneider, Saskatchewan
- Bruce Coulter Award: Xavier Lafont, Western Ontario
- Attendance: 28,652

The 30th Vanier Cup was played on November 19, 1994, at the SkyDome in Toronto, Ontario, and decided the CIAU football champion for the 1994 season. The Western Mustangs won their record sixth championship by defeating the Saskatchewan Huskies by a score of 50-40 in the first Vanier Cup game to go to overtime.
