= Frank Cosentino =

Former Canadian football player and coach

Profile
- Position: Quarterback

Personal information
- Born: May 22, 1937 (age 89); Hamilton, Ontario, Canada
- Listed height: 6 ft 3 in (1.91 m)
- Listed weight: 195 lb (88 kg)

Career information
- University: Western Ontario
- CFL draft: 1960: 1st round, 5th overall pick

Career history

Playing
- 1960–1966: Hamilton Tiger-Cats
- 1967–1968: Edmonton Eskimos
- 1969: Toronto Argonauts

Coaching
- 1970–1974: Western Mustangs (HC)
- 1978–1980, 1984–1987: York Yeomen (HC)

Awards and highlights
- 2× Grey Cup champion (1963, 1965); 2× Vanier Cup champion (1971, 1974); Frank Tindall Trophy winner (1970)

Career CFL statistics
- Passing completions: 482
- Passing attempts: 996
- Passing pct.: 48.4%
- Passing yards: 7678
- TD–INT: 53–66
- Canadian Football Hall of Fame (Class of 2018)

Frank Cosentino (born May 22, 1937) is a Canadian former professional football quarterback in the Canadian Football League (CFL) and a former head coach in University football. He played professionally for the Hamilton Tiger-Cats, Edmonton Eskimos and Toronto Argonauts for ten years where he was a two-time Grey Cup champion, winning in 1963 and 1965. He was head coach of the Western Mustangs football team for five years where he led the team to two Vanier Cup wins in 1971 and 1974 before completing his coaching career with the York Yeomen. Cosentino was inducted into the Canadian Football Hall of Fame in 2018.

== Early life ==
Born and raised in Hamilton, he played baseball with Russ Jackson and Murray Oliver in the Hamilton Police Minor Baseball Association. He attracted offers from the Cleveland Indians, Milwaukee Braves and Kansas City Athletics. He played Junior and senior intercounty baseball with Hamilton teams. He was also a noted fastball pitcher and played basketball through his years at Cathedral High School and one year with the University of Western Ontario Mustangs basketball team. His football career began with the Hamilton Old Boys Football Association and later as a quarterback at Cathedral High School in 1954. The League championship was won in 1954; the team went to the Red Feather game in 1955 and were league finalists that year.

== University career ==
Cosentino had offers from universities in Canada and the United States but decided on the University of Western Ontario where he graduated in Honours Business Administration in 1960. While at Western, he played four season with the Mustangs, winning Yates Cup championships in 1957 and 1959. His last game with Western was as Captain and quarterback in the inaugural Canadian Intercollegiate championship contest versus UBC Thunderbirds, a 34–12 win for Western.

== Professional career ==
Cosentino was drafted fifth overall in the first found in the 1960 CFL draft by the Hamilton Tiger-Cats. He was with Hamilton from 1960 to 1966 where he was primarily a backup behind Bernie Faloney and later Joe Zuger. He played in five Grey Cup games, winning championships in 1963 and 1965. Following the emergence of Zuger as the team's starter, Cosentino was traded to the Edmonton Eskimos in 1967, where he became the team's starter and was their nominee for the CFL's Most Outstanding Canadian Award. He had a reduced role with Edmonton in 1968 and then joined the Toronto Argonauts for the 1969 season. His year with Toronto was stifled by what Leo Cahill called "an act of God" when Ottawa and Russ Jackson erased an 8-point Toronto lead to defeat the Argos, represent the East, and win the 1969 Grey Cup game. He finished his career after the 1969 season, playing in 141 regular season games and starting in 41, posting 20 wins, 19 losses, and two ties in that span. He completed 482 passes out of 996 attempts for 7,678 passing yards with 53 touchdowns and 66 interceptions.

== Coaching and teaching career ==
While playing in the CFL, Cosentino continued his education after having graduated from Western in 1960 with an HBA. He acquired a Bachelor of Physical Health & Education (BPHE) degree at McMaster University in 1967, a master's from the University of Alberta in 1969, followed by a PhD from Alberta in 1973. In 1970, he succeeded John P. Metras as coach of the Mustangs. During six years of teaching, including five of coaching at the University of Western Ontario, his teams won the Vanier Cup in 1971 and 1974. From 1976 through 1981 he served at York University in Toronto as professor and chair of Physical Education and Athletics and also coached for seven more years. He retired from the university in 1997. Cosentino is also known for authoring eighteen books, three of which are on Canadian football, mostly on the history of sport in Canada. He is a member of Halls of Fame at McMaster, York, Western, Ontario University Athletics and the Canadian Football Hall of Fame.

== Personal life ==
Cosentino lives in Eganville, Ontario, with his wife Sheila. They have four children, twelve grandchildren, and eight great grandchildren.
