= Marc Liegghio =

Canadian gridiron football player (born 1997)

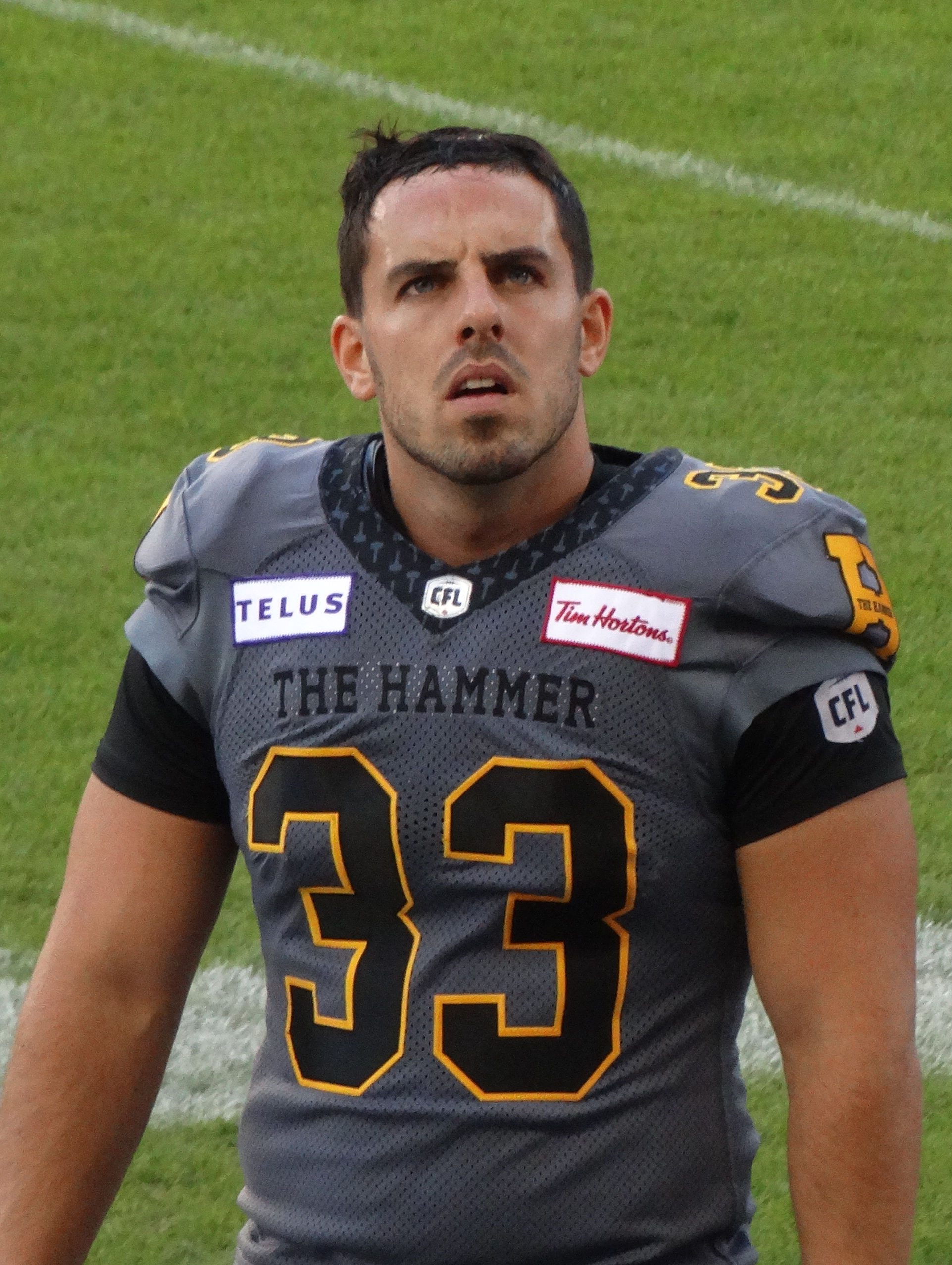
- Liegghio with the Hamilton Tiger-Cats in 2024

No. 33 – Hamilton Tiger-Cats
- Position: Placekicker
- Roster status: Active
- CFL status: National

Personal information
- Born: February 13, 1997 (age 29); Woodbridge, Ontario, Canada
- Listed height: 5 ft 8 in (1.73 m)
- Listed weight: 193 lb (88 kg)

Career information
- High school: Bill Crothers Secondary
- University: Western
- CFL draft: 2020: 5th round, 39th overall pick

Career history
- 2021–2022: Winnipeg Blue Bombers
- 2023–present: Hamilton Tiger-Cats

Awards and highlights
- Grey Cup champion (2021); Vanier Cup champion (2017)

Career CFL statistics as of 2026
- Field goals made: 215
- Field goals attempted: 244
- Field goal %: 88.1
- Points scored: 834
- Longest field goal: 55
- Stats at CFL.ca

Marc Liegghio (born February 13, 1997) is a Canadian professional football placekicker for the Hamilton Tiger-Cats of the Canadian Football League (CFL). He is a Vanier Cup after winning with the Western Mustangs in 2017 and is a Grey Cup champion after winning with the Winnipeg Blue Bombers in 2021.

== University career ==
Liegghio played U Sports football for the Western Mustangs from 2015 to 2019. He sat out the 2015 season due to injury, but became the team's placekicker and punter in 2016 where he was named an OUA Second Team All-Star.

In 2017, Liegghio was named a U Sports Second-team All-Canadian as a placekicker after connecting on 29 of 33 field goal attempts and all but one of his point-after-touchdown converts. He finished that season as a Vanier Cup champion when the Mustangs completed an undefeated season and defeated the Laval Rouge et Or in the 53rd Vanier Cup game. In that game, Liegghio missed his only field goal attempt, but was perfect on five point-after-touchdown converts and had eight punts with a 41.8-yard average. In 2018, he was named a U Sports Second-team All-Canadian, but this time as a punter. His best season came in 2019 when he became the first player to be named a U Sports First-team All-Canadian at both the placekicker and punter positions as he set a U Sports single-season record with a 47.5-yard punt average and connected on 22 out of 24 field goal attempts. In four seasons with the Mustangs, he became the all-time leading scorer in OUA history with 442 points and set the U Sports record with 92 successfully made field goals (from 105 attempts).

== Professional career ==
Pre-draft measurables
Height	Weight
5 ft 8 1/8 in (1.73 m)	195 lb (88 kg)
Values from Pro Day

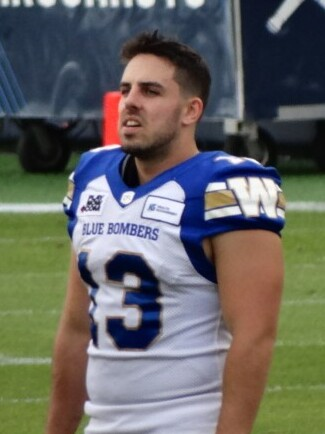
Liegghio with the Winnipeg Blue Bombers in 2022

=== Winnipeg Blue Bombers ===
Liegghio was drafted in the fifth round, 39th overall, in the 2020 CFL draft, by the Winnipeg Blue Bombers. However, he did not play in 2020 due to the cancellation of both the 2020 CFL season and the 2020 U Sports football season. Instead, he signed with the Blue Bombers on January 7, 2021 to a rookie contract. He was named the team's punter following training camp with Tyler Crapigna handling the placekicking duties. Liegghio played in his first professional game on August 5, 2021 against the Hamilton Tiger-Cats where he had 10 punts for a 41.4-yard average (36.2-yards net average). With Crapigna out with injury in the week 4 game against the Calgary Stampeders, Liegghio was also named the team's placekicker for the August 29, 2021 game. When Sergio Castillo joined the team in October 2021, Liegghio relinquished placekicker duties. He played in all 14 regular season games in 2021, where he had 92 punts for a 43.7-yard average and four singles along with connecting on five of eight field goal attempts and five of eight point-after conversions. Liegghio played in both of the team's post-season games, including the team's 33–25 overtime victory over the Hamilton Tiger-Cats in the 108th Grey Cup game where he had five punts with a 38.7-yard average and one single.

After Castillo left the Blue Bombers in free agency, Liegghio resumed double duty as the Blue Bombers' placekicker and punter for the 2022 season. The low point in his season came in week 10 with the team holding a 9–0 record and facing the Montreal Alouettes. With the two teams tied 17–17, Liegghio had an opportunity to win the game with a 32-yard field goal, but missed with no time remaining in regulation. He then missed a 37-yard field goal in overtime and the Alouettes won 20–17, ending the Blue Bombers' winning streak. He did, however, make a career-long 55-yard field goal in the Labour Day Classic on September 4, 2022. He had another challenging outing late in the season against the BC Lions where he missed three long field goal attempts and finished 1-for-4 on the day. Despite some single game struggles, Liegghio finished with a strong regular season, having connected on 32 of 39 field goal attempts (82.1%) and had 91 punts with a 46.9-yard average. He again played in both post-season games and made one of two field goal attempts and two of three convert attempts in the Blue Bombers' 23–24 loss to the Toronto Argonauts.

Liegghio attended training camp with the Blue Bombers in 2023, but was part of the final roster cuts on June 3, 2023.

=== Hamilton Tiger-Cats ===
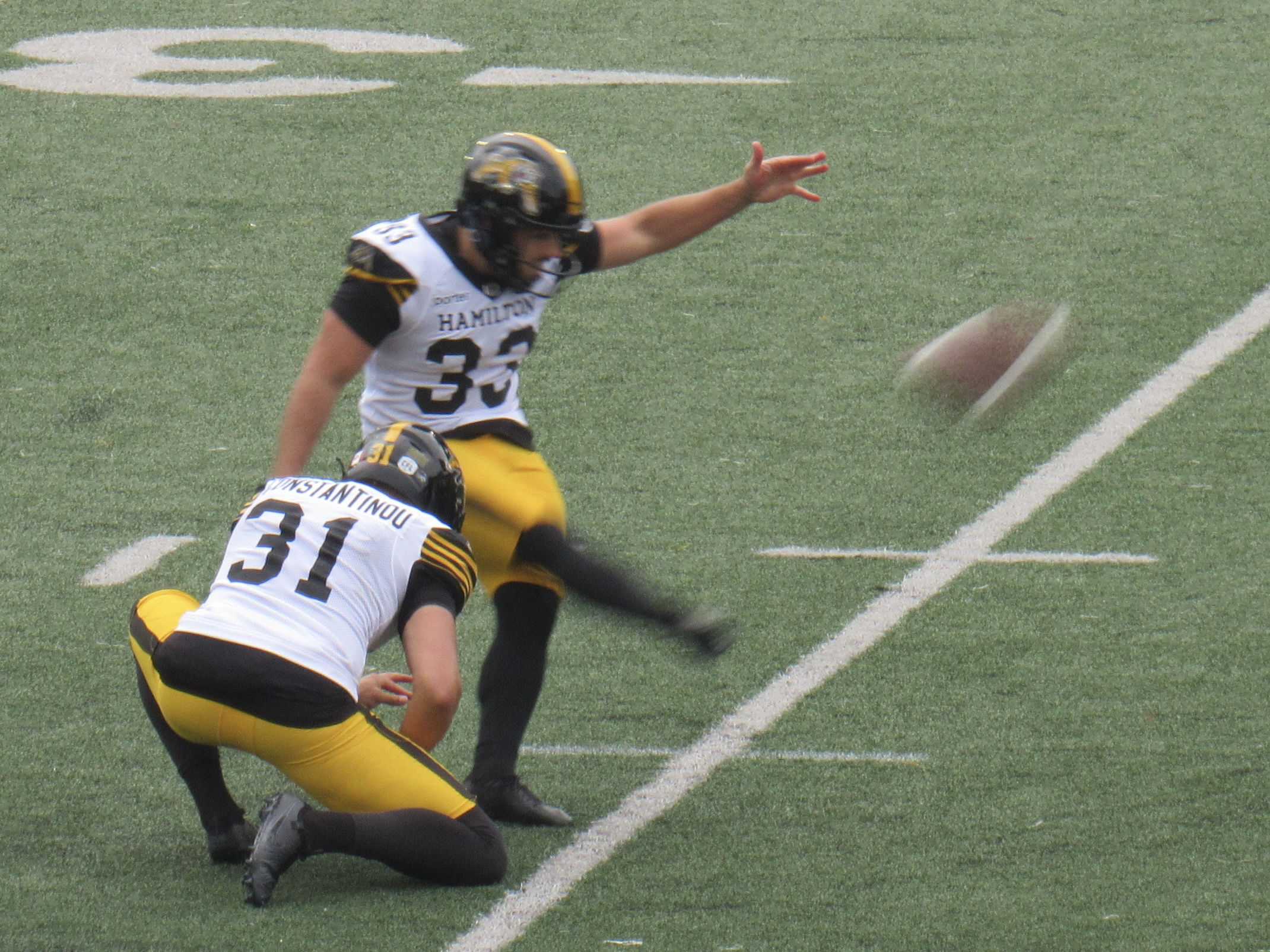
Liegghio kicking a field goal for the Tiger-Cats in 2025

On June 17, 2023, it was announced that Liegghio had signed with the Hamilton Tiger-Cats, with incumbent placekicker Seth Small being placed on the suspended list. He was successful on his first 17 field goal attempts with his first miss coming in August that year. He finished the 2023 regular season having played in 17 games where he connected on 41 of 47 field goal attempts and scored three singles. He also played in the team's East Semi-Final loss to the Montreal Alouettes where he was successful on all four of his field goal attempts with a long of 47 yards.

In 2024, Liegghio played in all 18 regular season games where he was 43-of-48 on field goal attempts for a career-high success rate of 89.6% and was 38-of-40 on point-after conversions, which was also a career-high percentage of 95.0%. He also finished the season having made 15 consecutive field goals.
