= Chris Merchant =

Canadian gridiron football player (born 1995)

Fehérvár Enthroners
- Position: Quarterback
- Roster status: Active

Personal information
- Born: October 10, 1995 (age 31); Calgary, Alberta, Canada
- Listed height: 6 ft 2 in (1.88 m)
- Listed weight: 210 lb (95 kg)

Career information
- High school: St. Andrew's College (Aurora, Ontario)
- College: Buffalo Bulls
- University: Western
- CFL draft: 2019: undrafted

Career history
- 2019: Montreal Alouettes*
- 2020: Vasa Royals*
- 2021: Las Rozas Black Demons
- 2022–present: Fehérvár Enthroners
- * Offseason or practice squad member only

Awards and highlights
- Hungarian Bowl champion (XVI); Hungarian Bowl MVP (XVI); Hec Crighton Trophy (2019); First-team All-Canadian (2019); Vanier Cup champion (2017); Vanier Cup MVP (2017)
- Stats at CFL.ca

Chris Merchant (born October 10, 1995) is a Canadian football quarterback for the Fehérvár Enthroners of the Hungarian American Football League (HAFL). He is a Vanier Cup champion after leading the Western Mustangs to a win in 2017 and a Hec Crighton Trophy winner after he earned the award in the final year of his university playing eligibility in 2019.

== University career ==
=== Buffalo Bulls ===
Merchant joined the Buffalo Bulls on a full-ride scholarship in 2014 where he had a redshirt season in his first year. He had been recruited to the University of Buffalo by Jeff Quinn, but Quinn was fired midway through 2014. He played in one game in 2015 and competed for the starter role in the 2016 spring scrimmage game. However, new head coach Lance Leipold and his coaching staff had recruited Tyree Jackson in 2015 and indicated that Jackson would be the starter for the 2016 season. Consequently, Merchant announced in May 2016 that he would be transferring to U Sports to attend the University of Western Ontario.

=== Western Mustangs ===
Merchant became the starting quarterback for the Western Mustangs and played in all eight regular season games in 2016. That year, he completed 107 passes out of 161 attempts for 1,720 yards with 14 passing touchdowns and five interceptions. He led the team to a first-place finish in the OUA and narrowly lost the Yates Cup to the Wilfrid Laurier Golden Hawks by a score of 43–40.

In 2017, Merchant again played in eight regular season games where he had 127 completions from 207 pass attempts for 1,995 yards, 12 touchdowns, and nine interceptions. In the playoffs, the Mustangs avenged their previous year's loss by defeating the Golden Hawks and winning the Yates Cup. After winning the Uteck Bowl over the Acadia Axemen, Merchant qualified for his first Vanier Cup championship game. In the 53rd Vanier Cup, he threw for 276 yards and two touchdowns, completing 13 of 20 pass attempts in the victory over the Laval Rouge et Or. He was also successful with running the ball as he had 13 carries for 89 yards and two touchdowns en route to being awarded the Ted Morris Memorial Trophy as the game's MVP. Overall in the four playoff games he played, Merchant completed 49 passes out of 69 attempts for 964 yards with six touchdowns and no interceptions to go along with his 34 rush attempts for 228 yards and six touchdowns. The Mustangs also finished undefeated for the season as Merchant led them to a 12–0 record overall.

As the defending Vanier Cup champions in 2018, Merchant again led the Mustangs to an undefeated regular season as he completed 127 passes out of 173 attempts for 2,104 yards with 17 touchdowns and five interceptions. He had an outstanding game in the Yates Cup against the Guelph Gryphons as he completed 86.4% of his passes for 324 yards and one touchdown to go along with seven carries for 66 yards and three touchdowns. The Mustangs defeated the Saskatchewan Huskies in the Mitchell Bowl with Merchant throwing for 251 yards and two touchdowns and rushing for 82 yards and one touchdown. Merchant started in the 54th Vanier Cup in a rematch against the Rouge et Or and while he passed for 358 yards with one touchdown and rushed for 81 yards, his three interceptions proved costly as Western fell to Laval.

After attending training camp with the Canadian Football League's Montreal Alouettes, Merchant returned to the Mustangs to complete his U Sports eligibility. He again led the team to an 8–0 regular season record as he had 2,378 passing yards and a 68.5% completion rate with 14 touchdowns and seven interceptions to go along with 438 rushing yards and six touchdowns. He took the Mustangs to the Yates Cup game for the fourth time, but he left the game with the team up 10–0 in the first quarter after he suffered a severe ankle injury. Western could not recover and lost the game to the McMaster Marauders 29–15. For his outstanding final season, Merchant was awarded the Hec Crighton Trophy as the best U Sports football player that year and became the sixth Mustang player to win the award. He finished his collegiate career having played in 32 regular season games, completing 521 out of 775 pass attempts for 8,202 yards with 57 touchdowns and 26 interceptions.

== Professional career ==
Pre-draft measurables
Height	Weight	40-yard dash	20-yard shuttle	Three-cone drill	Vertical jump	Broad jump	Bench press
6 ft 2 3/8 in (1.89 m)	211 lb (96 kg)	4.86 s	4.47 s	7.16 s	31.0 in (0.79 m)	9 ft 6 5/8 in (2.91 m)	7 reps
All values from CFL Combine

=== Montreal Alouettes ===
Merchant was eligible for the 2019 CFL draft, but was not selected and signed as an undrafted free agent on May 19, 2019, with the Montreal Alouettes of the Canadian Football League (CFL). He played briefly in one preseason game on May 30, 2019, against the Toronto Argonauts where both of his pass attempts fell incomplete. He was then released on June 8, 2019, as the Alouettes kept former Laval quarterback, Hugo Richard, who Merchant had faced twice in Vanier Cup games.

=== Wasa Royals ===
Merchant signed with the Wasa Royals of the Vaahteraliiga on February 17, 2020. However, due to the COVID-19 pandemic, he was unable to play with the team for the 2020 season.

=== Las Rozas Black Demons ===
On August 10, 2020, it was announced that Merchant had signed with the Las Rozas Black Demons of the Liga Nacional de Fútbol Americano to play in their 2021 season. He led the team to an appearance in the championship game, but suffered a serious knee injury as he watched his team lose to the Badalona Dracs 31–21.

=== Fehérvár Enthroners ===
Merchant signed with the Fehérvár Enthroners of the Hungarian American Football League ahead of the 2022 season.
