= Greg Marshall (running back) =

Canadian gridiron football coach (born 1959)

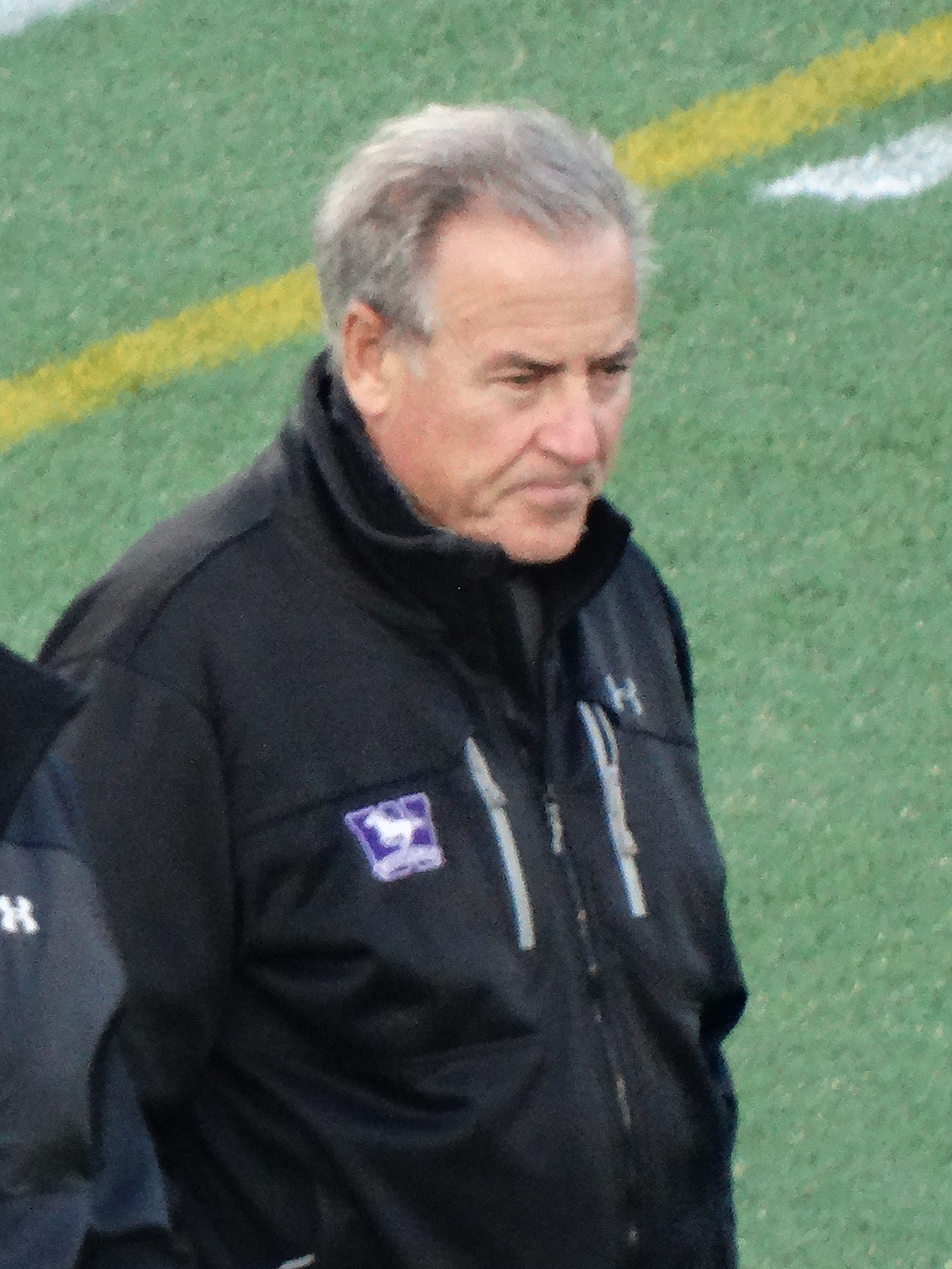
- Marshall with the Western Mustangs in 2025

Personal information
- Born: April 16, 1959 (age 67); Guelph, Ontario, Canada
- Listed height: 6 ft 0 in (1.83 m)
- Listed weight: 225 lb (102 kg)

Career information
- Position: Running back (No. 38)
- University: Western Ontario
- CFL draft: 1982: Territorial exemptionth round

Career history

Playing
- 1982–1984: Edmonton Eskimos

Coaching
- 1984–1991: Western Mustangs
- 1992–1996: Western Mustangs (OC)
- 1997–2003: McMaster Marauders (HC)
- 2004–2006: Hamilton Tiger-Cats (HC)
- 2006: Western Mustangs (OC)
- 2007–2025: Western Mustangs (HC/OC)

Awards and highlights
- Grey Cup champion (1982); 4× Vanier Cup champion (1989, 1994, 2017, 2021); 23× Yates Cup champion (1979, 1980, 1981, 1985, 1986, 1988, 1989, 1990, 1994, 1995, 2000–2003, 2007, 2008, 2010, 2013, 2017, 2018, 2021, 2022, 2023); Hec Crighton Trophy (1980); 3x U Sports Coach of the Year (2000, 2018, 2019); 8× OUA Coach of the Year (1999, 2000, 2010, 2013, 2015, 2018, 2019, 2022); CFL Coach of the Year (2004)

Greg Marshall (born April 19, 1959) is a Canadian former football running back and coach. He was more notably the head coach for the University of Western Ontario's football team, the Western Mustangs. He is a four-time Vanier Cup champion, winning twice as an assistant coach and twice as a head coach, and he is a Grey Cup champion after winning with the Edmonton Eskimos in 1982. Marshall was the head coach with the Hamilton Tiger-Cats of the Canadian Football League (CFL) from 2004 to 2006. Prior to his time with the Tiger-Cats, Marshall was the head coach of McMaster University's football team. He is the brother of Blake Marshall.

== Playing career ==
Marshall had a successful collegiate career at the University of Western Ontario, and as a running back won the 1980 Hec Crighton Trophy as Canada's best collegiate player. Following his time in university, Marshall moved to the Canadian Football League's Edmonton Eskimos. Marshall played three years, from 1982 to 1984, in the CFL with the Eskimos, winning a Grey Cup in the 70th incarnation of the Canadian football championship game. Marshall's Eskimos defeated the Toronto Argonauts 32–16, the last of Edmonton's legendary five Grey Cups in a row.

After his playing career, Marshall moved back to Western Ontario in 1984 to join the coaching staff.

== Coaching career ==
=== First university stint ===
Marshall coached at Western from 1984 to 1996, becoming the school's offensive coordinator in 1992 and helping the team win two Vanier Cups. In 1997, Marshall was lured to McMaster University and became the school's head coach.

In his first experience as a head coach, Marshall was an immediate success. McMaster went winless the season before Marshall's arrival, and he improved the team to a less disgraceful 2–5–1. The next year, McMaster made its first playoff appearance in twelve seasons, and in 1999 McMaster made the conference finals, where they were defeated by Wilfrid Laurier University. This was good enough to make Marshall OUA Coach of the Year.

In 2000, McMaster won their first Yates Cup but were defeated by the University of Ottawa in the chase for the Vanier Cup. Marshall was named the CIS Coach of the Year, becoming only the second person ever to be named both the top player and the top coach in Canadian university football. From 2000 to 2003, Marshall led McMaster to a record-tying four consecutive Yates Cup championships, but never once captured the Vanier Cup as Canadian university football's top team.

=== Professional coach ===
Marshall joined the Hamilton Tiger-Cats to start the 2004 CFL season, replacing the legendary Ron Lancaster as head coach. The Tiger-Cats had finished with only a single win in 2003, and expectations on Marshall were not high. He was both the Tiger-Cats' first Canadian-born head coach and the first CIS coach to be named directly to a head coaching position in the CFL.

Under Marshall, the Tiger-Cats exceeded all expectations. The team won its first three games and finished at 9–8–1, good enough to make the playoffs in the East Division and make Marshall the first rookie head coach to be named Coach of the Year since Edmonton's Ray Jauch in 1970. The Tiger-Cats lost the East Semi-Final to Toronto 24–6.

2005 was a regression for the Tiger-Cats, as they finished last in the league at 5–13. Thanks to mediocre performances from a succession of quarterbacks that included Danny McManus, Khari Jones, Marcus Brady, and Kevin Eakin, the Tiger-Cats were forced to trade for Edmonton quarterback Jason Maas in the off-season. However, with the arrival of Maas and the emergence of young running back Jesse Lumsden as a legitimate threat late in the season, expectations were higher on Marshall and the Tiger-Cats for the 2006 season.

2006 started off very rocky for Marshall, going into the current campaign with four straight losses, putting his very short coaching career in jeopardy. The situation was finally put on ice as general manager Rob Katz and owner Bob Young made the tough decision to end his tenure with the club, making Lancaster interim head coach once more.

=== CFL coaching record ===
Team	Year	Regular season					Postseason		
Team	Year	Won	Lost	Ties	Win %	Finish	Won	Lost	Result
HAM	2004	9	8	1	.529	3rd in East Division	0	1	Lost in Division Finals
HAM	2005	5	13	0	.278	4th in East Division	–	–	Missed playoffs
HAM	2006	0	4	0	.000	4th in East Division	–	–	(fired)
Total		14	25	1	.363	0 East Division; Championships	0	1	0 Grey Cups

=== Second university stint ===
In August 2006, Marshall returned to Western Ontario as offensive co-ordinator, which generated a large amount of coverage due to his prominence as a CFL coach. After the retirement of longtime Western coach Larry Haylor, Marshall became head coach of the program in 2007.

He has since led the Mustangs to nine Yates Cup conference championships in 2007, 2008, 2010, 2013, 2017, 2018, 2021, 2022, and 2023. He made his first appearance as a head coach in the Vanier Cup game in 2008, but lost to the perennial power house Laval Rouge et Or. Marshall would go on to win the Vanier Cup against Laval in 2017, his first national championship as a head coach.

In 2018 and 2019, Marshall was named U Sports Coach of the Year for the second and third time in his coaching career, tying him with Tuffy Knight for most all-time. In 2021, Marshall led the Mustangs to the eighth Vanier Cup championship in program history and his second as head coach.

On December 17, 2025, Marshall announced his retirement from Western.
