= Marvin Kwitko =

Canadian ophthalmologist

Marvin Kwitko FACS, FICS, FRCS, KStJ
- Born: March 3, 1931; New York City, United States
- Died: August 20, 2002 (aged 71); Montreal, Quebec, Canada
- Citizenship: Canadian
- Education: University of Western Ontario
- Occupation: Ophthalmologist
- Known for: Cataract and laser eye surgery
- Children: 4
- Honours: Venerable Order of St. John

Marvin Leo Kwitko, FACS, FICS, FRCS, KStJ (March 3, 1931 – August 20, 2002) was a Canadian ophthalmologist who pioneered in cataract surgery and laser eye surgery. He is one of Canada’s most distinguished ophthalmologic writers and surgeons. Kwitko was the first doctor in Canada to insert intraocular lens implants during cataract surgery (1967) and the first doctor in Canada to perform radial keratotomy surgery (1979).

He was associate professor of ophthalmology at McGill University in Montreal as well as Chief of Ophthalmology at St. Mary’s Hospital in Montreal. In 2002 he was made a knight, when The Governor General, Adrienne Clarkson, on the recommendation of the Grand Prior, appointed him to the Most Venerable Order of St. John of Jerusalem. Kwitko also served on the Advisory Committee on the Excimer Laser for Health and Welfare Canada. Most notable, he was the founder and 20 year president of the Canadian Implant Society.

Kwitko was born to Louis Kwitko and Rose Gomberg in New York, NY. He had two sisters, Phyllis Kantor and Sandra Mula. A few years after his birth, the family moved to Brantford, Ontario. Kwitko went to Brantford Collegiate High School. After graduating, Kwitko attended the University of Western Ontario and received a B.A in English (1955), M.D. (1956) and his master's degree in Pharmacology (1958). While in university, he was an active member of the Western Mustang Band and served as the bandmaster in 1954 and 1955. He was a resident and Fellow in ophthalmology at the Washington, D.C. Hospital Center.

In 2002, Kwitko died in Montreal, Quebec, Canada. He was survived by his wife Alicja Zakrzewski, four children, and four grandchildren.

== Books ==
Kwitko was author of six books, including Glaucoma in Infants and Children; Pseudophakia: Current Trends and Concepts; Surgery of the Infant Eye; Geriatric Ophthalmology; Eyes and The History of Modern Cataract Surgery. His textbook Pseudophakia: Current Trends and Concepts; published in 1980, was one of the first formal textbooks on the technology of intraocular lens implantation in the cataract patient.

== Other ==
He was Senior Lecturer at the American Academy of Ophthalmology, Secretary for the International College of Surgeons, President of the International Council on cataract and refractive surgery, served on the board of 10 ophthalmologic journals, Board of Directors of the National Association for Visually Handicapped and Past president of the Montreal Chapter of Canadian Associates of Ben Gurion University of the Negev. As Executive Secretary of the International Society of Geographic Ophthalmology, Kwitko organized scientific meetings in Yellowknife, Cádiz, Tunis, Sardinia and Rio de Janeiro. In 1975 he helped co found the American Society of Cataract and Refractive Surgery.

He is the recipient of the University of Western Ontario Honor Award (1956), the Senior Honor Award of the American Academy of Ophthalmology (1989), La Medaille d'Honneur, L'Association Francaise des Implants Intraculaires (1976), the Prof. Ignacio Barraguer Award (Spain 1970), the P. Siva Reddy Medal (India 1980) and the Agora trophy from Les Club des Ambassadeurs.

Kwitko developed the "Rose and Louis Kwitko" Scholarship at Brantford Collegiate High School, the Dr. Marvin L. Kwitko Scholarship in Anatomy at the University of Western Ontario, and the "Dr. Marvin L. Kwitko" Scholarship at the University of Toronto.
