= John Metras =

American player of Canadian football (1940–2020)

Profile
- Position: Centre

Personal information
- Born: August 29, 1940; Detroit, Michigan, US
- Died: June 30, 2020 (aged 79); Ontario, Canada
- Listed height: 6 ft 2 in (1.88 m)
- Listed weight: 235 lb (107 kg)

Career history
- 1964–1965: Hamilton Tiger-Cats

Awards and highlights
- Grey Cup champion (1965)

John George Metras QC (August 29, 1940 – June 30, 2020) was a Canadian football player who played for the Hamilton Tiger-Cats. He won the Grey Cup with them in 1965. He previously played football at the University of Western Ontario, where his father John P. Metras coached. John G. Metras graduated from Western Ontario in 1964 with a LL.B. degree and was called to the bar in 1966. His father was later inducted into the Canadian Football Hall of Fame in 1980 as a builder. John Metras, Jr. was inducted into the Western Ontario Wall of Champions in 2013. He later worked as a lawyer. Metras died on June 30, 2020.
