= John P. Metras =

American sport coach (1909–1982)

Profile
- Positions: Center, Left tackle

Personal information
- Born: April 8, 1909; Berrien County, Michigan, US
- Died: April 13, 1982 (aged 73); Naples, Florida, US
- Listed height: 5 ft 10 in (1.78 m)
- Listed weight: 195 lb (88 kg)

Career history

Playing
- c. 1927: Western State Broncos
- c. 1932: Detroit Titans
- 1933–1935: St. Michael's College

Coaching
- 1935–1939: Western Mustangs asst.
- 1940–1969: Western Mustangs coach

Operations
- 1945–1972: University of Western Ontario athletic director

Career statistics
- Wins: 110
- Losses: 77
- Ties: 11
- Yates Cup: 1946, 1947, 1949, 1950, 1952, 1953, 1957, 1959
- Churchill Bowl: 1956, 1957, 1959
- Canadian Football Hall of Fame (Class of Builder, 1980)

John Pius Metras (April 8, 1909 – April 13, 1982) was an American coach of Canadian football and basketball. He led Western Mustangs football from 1940 to 1969, winning 110 games, eight Yates Cups, and three Churchill Bowls. He coached 157 players who graduated to play in the Canadian Football League, including his son John. Metras was the first college coach inducted into the Canadian Football Hall of Fame, and is honored by the annual J. P. Metras Trophy for the outstanding U Sports lineman. Prior to coaching the Mustangs, he was a player-coach for St. Michael's College, and was named an all-American as captain of the Detroit Titans.

As the athletic director at University of Western Ontario from 1945 to 1972, Metras also coached basketball and ice hockey. His straightforward and gruff demeanor earned him the nickname, "The Bull". Never having a losing basketball season in 19 years, his teams won 14 Ontario-Quebec Athletic Association championships, won 134 of 164 league games, and were the first university team to compete in the Canadian Olympic team trials. He was posthumously inducted into the Canadian Basketball Hall of Fame in 2002.

== Early life and playing career ==
John Pius Metras was born April 8, 1909, in Berrien County, Michigan, and grew up in Dowagiac, Michigan. He was a four-sport athlete in high school and an all-state halfback. After graduating from Dowagiac High School, he played football and basketball at Western State Teachers College. Originally playing left tackle, Metras was captain of the Detroit Titans in 1932, when he was named an all-American playing center. After graduation from University of Detroit, he tried out for the Detroit Lions.

Metras came to Canada with teammate Bill Storen in 1933, to play in the senior Ontario Rugby Football Union division for St. Michael's College. As a player-coach and center, he earned CA$100 per week plus room and board. The Canadian Press named him an Eastern Canada second-team all-star at centre in 1933, and an Eastern Canada first-team all-star at centre in 1934. At the end of his playing career, he was 5 feet 10 inches (1.78 m) and 195 pounds (88 kg).

== University of Western Ontario ==
Metras joined University of Western Ontario as an assistant coach to Storen for Western Mustangs football from 1935 to 1939, then succeeded Storen as the team's head coach from 1940 to 1969. During 35 years coaching the Mustangs, he accumulated a lifetime head coach record of 110 wins, 77 losses, and 11 ties, (Note: Multiple career won/loss totals are reported for Metras: 106 wins, 76 losses, 11 ties. (at beginning of 1969 season); 106 wins, 76 losses, 11 ties. (end of career); 110 wins, 77 losses, 11 ties.; 122 wins, 80 losses and 11 ties.) won nine Senior Intercollegiate Football League championships, (Note: The 1939 championship occurred while Metras was an assistant coach. The other eight occurred while he was head coach.) and once had a 29-game undefeated streak. (Note: From 1945 to 1948, the Mustangs won 26 straight games. The undefeated streak lasted 29 games.) His Mustangs won the Yates Cup as league champions in 1939, 1946, 1947, 1949, 1950, 1952, 1953, 1957, and 1959; and were Churchill Bowl champions versus the UBC Thunderbirds in 1956, 1957, and 1959. (Note: 1956 Churchill Bowl champions. 1957 Churchill Bowl champions. 1959 Churchill Bowl champions.) He coached 157 players who graduated to play in the Canadian Football League. Metras felt that Joe Krol was the most well-rounded athlete he had coached. Other notable former players of Metras include politicians Don Getty and John Robarts, and justice Coulter Osborne. Metras was succeeded by his protege Frank Cosentino in 1970. Metras set a career record for wins by a Canadian university coach which stood until broken by Larry Haylor in 1998.

In addition to football, Metras coached the Western Mustangs basketball team from 1945 to 1964, and was a member of the US–Canada basketball rules committee. (Note: Member of the US–Canada basketball rules committee. The basketball rules committee originated as the International Basketball Rules Commission, a collaboration between the Amateur Athletic Union of Canada and the Amateur Athletic Union of the United States, to govern playing rules for basketball.) His basketball team played annual home-and-home exhibition games versus Assumption College in Windsor. He regularly recruited athletes from the Windsor Area which had no university football, and limited academic options at the time. He booked suites of rooms at the Prince Edward Hotel, filled a bathtub full of ice and beer, and held all-night recruitment parties for local high school football and basketball coaches. Metras never had a losing basketball season in 19 years of coaching, and won 14 Ontario-Quebec Athletic Association championships. He twice took his team to the Canadian Olympic team trials in 1947–48 and 1951–52, becoming the first university team to compete in the trials. The Western Mustangs won 134 of 164 league games under his leadership.

Metras stressed fundamentals while coaching, and did not place winning above an education. He opposed athletic scholarships since the money came from donors who prioritized winning over education. He also coached Western Mustangs men's ice hockey, and was the athletic director from 1945 to 1972, when succeeded by Bob Barney. As of 1969, Metras was the only remaining person in the Ontario-Quebec Athletic Association to have the combined roles of athletic director and head coach of football. He felt the workload too much to do justice to both positions. In retirement, he was named to the university's board of governors as chairman of the intercollegiate athletic program, was a secondary school liaison, and assistant manager of the Thompson Recreation and Athletic Centre. As of 1983, he worked on a fundraising program to refurbish J. W. Little Memorial Stadium, the Mustangs' home football field.

== Personal life ==
Metras and his family were council members of the Knights of Columbus in Dowagiac. He was married to Shirley, and had two sons and a daughter. His son, John, played football for him with the Mustangs, won the 1965 Grey Cup playing center for the Hamilton Tiger-Cats, and later became a lawyer.

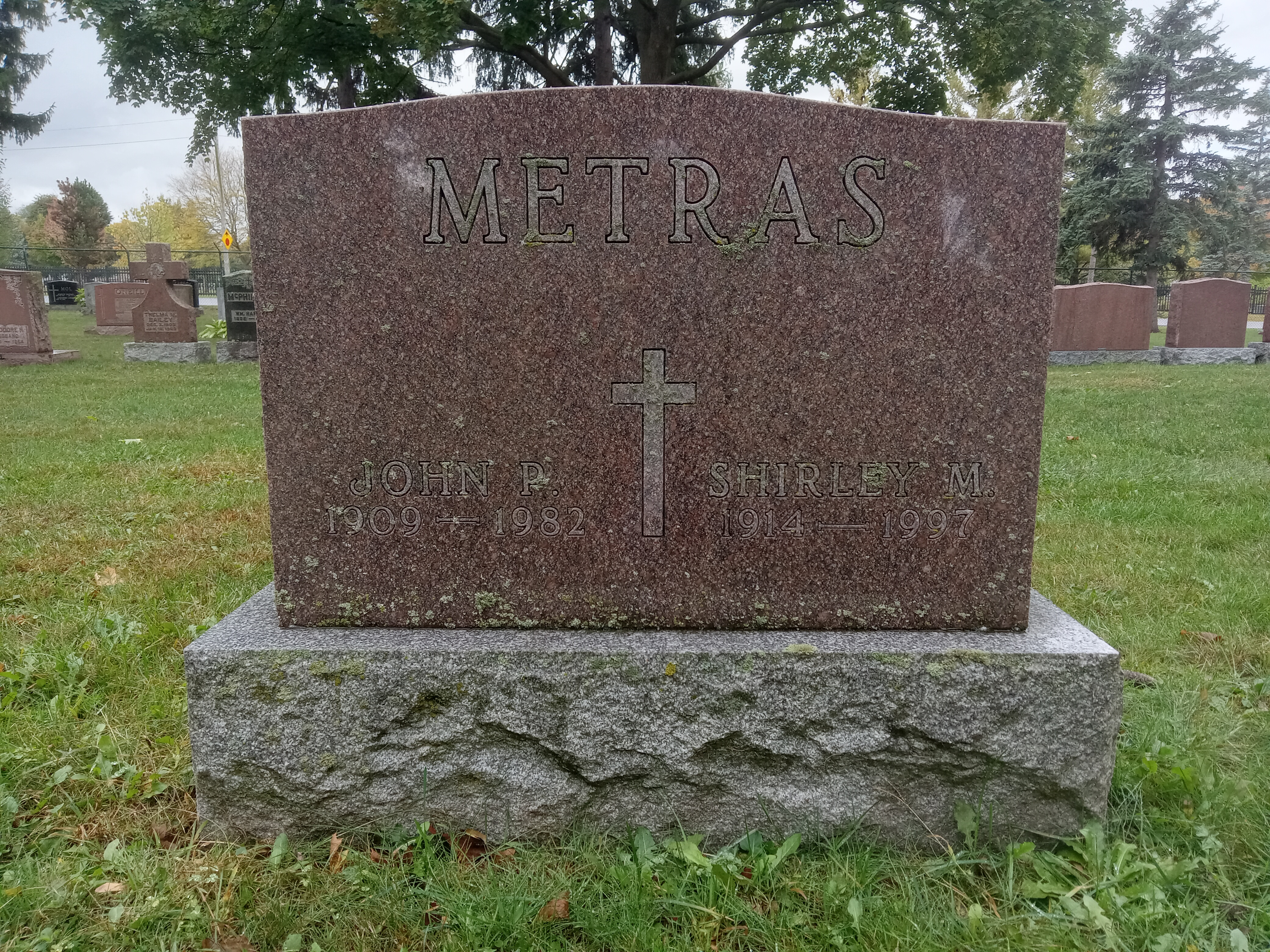
Metras's grave marker

Metras was a recreational golfer, and played 36 holes of golf hours before his death. He died from a heart attack on April 13, 1982, at his seasonal home in Naples, Florida. He was interred at St. Peter's Cemetery in London, Ontario.

== Honors and legacy ==
In 1969, Metras was the first recipient of the Canadian College Bowl award for outstanding contribution to college football. In 1970, he was one of the two inaugural recipients of the merit award from the National Association of Basketball Coaches of Canada. In its centennial year of 1974, the Canadian Intercollegiate Athletic Union established the J. P. Metras Trophy awarded annually to the outstanding university football lineman. In the same year, the Ontario Universities Athletics Association began the J. P. Metras Award for the outstanding university football lineman in Ontario.

The straightforward and gruff demeanor of Metras earned him the nickname, "The Bull". He was inducted into the builder category of the Canadian Football Hall of Fame in 1980, the first college coach to be given the honor. He was inducted into the University of Western Ontario Sports Hall of Fame in 1980, and the university's John P. Metras Sports Museum was founded in 1984. He was posthumously inducted into the Canadian Basketball Hall of Fame in 2002, and into coaches category of the Football Ontario Hall of Fame in 2023.
