= 25th Vanier Cup =

1989 Canadian university football championship

Saskatchewan Huskies	Western Mustangs
(6–2)	(6–1)
10	35
Head coach: Brian Towriss	Head coach: Larry Haylor
	1	2	3	4	Total
Saskatchewan Huskies	0	0	0	10	10
Western Mustangs	0	0	0	35	35
- Date: November 18, 1989
- Stadium: SkyDome
- Location: Toronto
- Ted Morris Memorial Trophy: Tyrone Williams, Western Ontario
- Attendance: 32,847

The 25th Vanier Cup was played on November 18, 1989, at the SkyDome in Toronto, Ontario, and decided the CIAU football champion for the 1989 season. The Western Mustangs won their fifth championship by defeating the Saskatchewan Huskies by a score of 35-10. This was the first Vanier Cup game to be played in the SkyDome and set a Vanier Cup attendance record which stood until 2012.
