= 53rd Vanier Cup =

2017 Canadian university gridiron football championship

Laval Rouge et Or	Western Mustangs
(10–1)	(11–0)
17	39
Head coach: Glen Constantin	Head coach: Greg Marshall
	1	2	3	4	Total
Laval Rouge et Or	0	7	3	7	17
Western Mustangs	8	8	9	14	39
- Date: November 25, 2017
- Stadium: Tim Hortons Field
- Location: Hamilton, ON
- Ted Morris Memorial Trophy: Chris Merchant, Western
- Bruce Coulter Award: Fraser Sopik, Western
- National anthem: Sienna Kocsis
- Kick-off: 1:00 PM EST
- Referee: G MacLean
- Halftime show: The Trews
- Attendance: 10,754

Broadcasters
- Network: Sportsnet, TVA Sports
- Announcers: Tim Micallef (play-by-play); Mike Morreale (analyst)

The 53rd Vanier Cup (branded as the ArcelorMittal Dofasco Vanier Cup for sponsorship reasons), the 2017 edition of the U Sports football championship, was held on November 25, 2017, at Tim Hortons Field in Hamilton, Ontario. The defending champion Laval Rouge et Or made their 11th Vanier Cup appearance while the Western Mustangs made their nation-leading 13th appearance. This was a rematch of the 44th Vanier Cup which was won by Laval and also played in Hamilton. Western defeated Laval, 39–17, to win its first national championship since 1994.

Hamilton was awarded both the 2016 and 2017 Vanier Cup games; it marked the fifth time that the Vanier Cup had been hosted by Hamilton.

== Semi-finals ==
The Vanier Cup is played between the champions of the Mitchell Bowl and the Uteck Bowl, the national semi-final games. In 2017, according to the rotating schedule, the Canada West Hardy Trophy championship team, the Calgary Dinos hosted the Québec conference Dunsmore Cup championship team, the Rouge et Or, for the Mitchell Bowl. The Acadia Axemen, winners of the Atlantic conference's Loney Bowl, hosted the Yates Cup Ontario championship team, the Mustangs, for the Uteck Bowl.

== Scoring ==
53rd Vanier Cup

Quarter	1	2	3	4	Total
Laval	0	7	3	7	17
Western	8	8	9	14	39

at Tim Hortons Field, Hamilton, Ontario

- Date: November 25
- Game time: 1:00 p.m. EST
- Game weather: 9 °C (48 °F)
- Game attendance: 10,754
- Referee: G. MacLean
- TV: Sportsnet, TVA Sports
- Box Score

Game information
- 1 11:28 Western - Chris Merchant 13–yd run (Marc Liegghio kick) Drive: 8 plays, 84 yards in 3:32
- 1 1:45 Western - Marc Liegghio single
- 2 5:49 Western - Cedric Joseph 12–yd run (Marc Liegghio kick) Drive: 9 plays, 82 yards in 3:28
- 2 2:14 Laval - Benoit Gagnon-B 28–yd pass from Hugo Richard (David Côté kick) Drive: 9 plays, 78 yards in 3:30
- 2 0:00 Western - Marc Liegghio single
- 3 11:08 Western - Cedric Joseph 6–yd run (Marc Liegghio kick) Drive: 6 plays, 54 yards in 2:13
- 3 7:00 Western - Safety
- 3 1:53 Laval - David Côté 34–yd field goal Drive: 9 plays, 58 yards in 3:29
- 4 14:08 Western - Cole Majoros 32–yd pass from Chris Merchant (Marc Liegghio kick) Drive: 7 plays, 75 yards in 2:45
- 4 7:08 Western - Chris Merchant 10–yd run (Marc Liegghio kick) Drive: 10 plays, 73 yards in 4:54
- 4 00:07 Laval - Vincent Alarie-Tardif 1–yd run (David Côté kick) Drive: 6 plays, 67 yards in 1:20

Passing

- Laval - Hugo Richard 21/35, 235
- Western - Chris Merchant 13/20, 276

Rushing

- Laval - Vincent Alarie-Tardif 5-35
- Western - Alex Taylor 26-150

Receiving

- Laval - Jonathan Breton-Robert 7-49
- Western - Harry McMaster 5-115
