= 7th Vanier Cup =

1971 Canadian university football championship

Alberta Golden Bears	Western Mustangs
(6–2)	(5–3)
14	15
Head coach: Jim Donlevy	Head coach: Frank Cosentino
	1	2	3	4	Total
Alberta Golden Bears	0	0	0	14	14
Western Mustangs	0	0	0	15	15
- Date: November 20, 1971
- Stadium: Varsity Stadium
- Location: Toronto
- Ted Morris Memorial Trophy: Bob McGregor, Alberta
- Attendance: 13,041

The 7th Vanier Cup was played on November 20, 1971, at Varsity Stadium in Toronto, Ontario, and decided the CIAU football champion for the 1971 season. The Western Mustangs won their first ever championship by defeating the Alberta Golden Bears by a score of 15-14.
