= 10th Vanier Cup =

1974 Canadian university football championship

Western Mustangs	Toronto Varsity Blues
(5–1–1)	(7–0)
19	15
Head coach: Frank Cosentino	Head coach: Ron Murphy
	1	2	3	4	Total
Western Mustangs	1	9	9	0	19
Toronto Varsity Blues	9	0	0	6	15
- Date: November 22, 1974
- Stadium: Exhibition Stadium
- Location: Toronto
- Ted Morris Memorial Trophy: Ian Bryans, Western Ontario
- Attendance: 24,777

The 10th Vanier Cup was played on November 22, 1974, at Exhibition Stadium in Toronto, Ontario, and decided the CIAU football champion for the 1974 season. The Western Mustangs won their second championship by defeating the Toronto Varsity Blues by a score of 19–15.
