= 56th Vanier Cup =

2021 Canadian university football championship

Saskatchewan Huskies	Western Mustangs
(5–1)	(5–1)
21	27
Head coach: Scott Flory	Head coach: Greg Marshall
	1	2	3	4	Total
Saskatchewan Huskies	3	9	2	7	21
Western Mustangs	7	3	14	3	27
- Date: December 4, 2021
- Stadium: Telus Université Laval Stadium
- Location: Quebec City, Quebec
- Ted Morris Memorial Trophy: Evan Hillock, Western
- Bruce Coulter Award: Daniel Valente, Western
- Referee: J. Popplestone
- Attendance: 5,840

Broadcasters
- Network: English: CBC Sports, French: TVA Sports
- Announcers: Mark Lee (play-by-play), Justin Dunk (analyst), Paul Eddy Saint-Vilien (analyst), Signa Butler (sideline reporter)

The 2021 Vanier Cup, the 56th edition of the Canadian university football championship, was played on December 4, 2021, at Telus Stadium in Quebec City, Quebec. The OUA champion Western Mustangs defeated the Canada West champion Saskatchewan Huskies by a score of 27–21. The Mustangs made their U Sports–leading 15th Vanier Cup appearance and won their eighth championship. The Huskies made their tenth appearance in the title game, and first since 2006, but lost a record-tying seventh Vanier Cup game (Western had solely held the record with seven losses).

== Host ==
This was the seventh time that Quebec City hosted the Vanier Cup and the third consecutive game that was hosted by Université Laval. The 2021 game was scheduled one week later than originally intended in order to accommodate delays in the regular season due to the ongoing COVID-19 pandemic in Canada.

== Semi-Championships ==
The Vanier Cup is played between the champions of the Mitchell Bowl and the Uteck Bowl, the national semi-final games. In 2021, the Yates Cup Ontario championship team, the Western Mustangs, defeated the Atlantic conference's Loney Bowl championship team, the St. Francis Xavier X-Men, by a score of 61–6 to win the Mitchell Bowl. The winners of the Canada West Hardy Trophy champion, Saskatchewan Huskies, defeated the Québec conference Dunsmore Cup champion, Montreal Carabins, in the Uteck Bowl with a last minute touchdown to win 14–10.
