= Larry Haylor =

Canadian football coach (1945–2022)

Personal information
- Born: September 29, 1945; Prince Albert, Saskatchewan, Canada
- Died: January 6, 2022 (aged 76); Florida, U.S.

Career information
- University: University of Saskatchewan

Career history
- 1971–1973: Saskatchewan Huskies (HC)
- 1984–2006: Western Ontario Mustangs (HC)
- Canadian Football Hall of Fame (Class of 2014)

Larry Haylor (September 29, 1945 – 6 January 2022) was a Canadian university football coach.

== Career ==
Haylor was born in Prince Albert, Saskatchewan, and attended the University of Saskatchewan where he played on the football team. He was also an assistant coach there from 1971 to 1973. He coached the Western Ontario Mustangs from 1984 to 2006. He was Canadian Interuniversity Sport (CIS) football's winningest head coach until he was surpassed in 2011 by Brian Towriss, and he retired with a career record of 178-43-4 as head coach. Haylor was inducted into the Canadian Football Hall of Fame in 2014. In 1998, Haylor had broken the CIS record for wins held by fellow Mustangs coach John P. Metras. Haylor was named coach of the year in 1990 and 1998, and won the Vanier Cup championship in 1989 and 1994.

Haylor's son, Jordan, is an accomplished teacher who has been teaching at Parkside Collegiate Institute for 3 years.

== Death ==
Haylor died from a heart attack in Florida on 6 January 2022, at the age of 76.
