= Darian Durant =

American gridiron football player (born 1982)

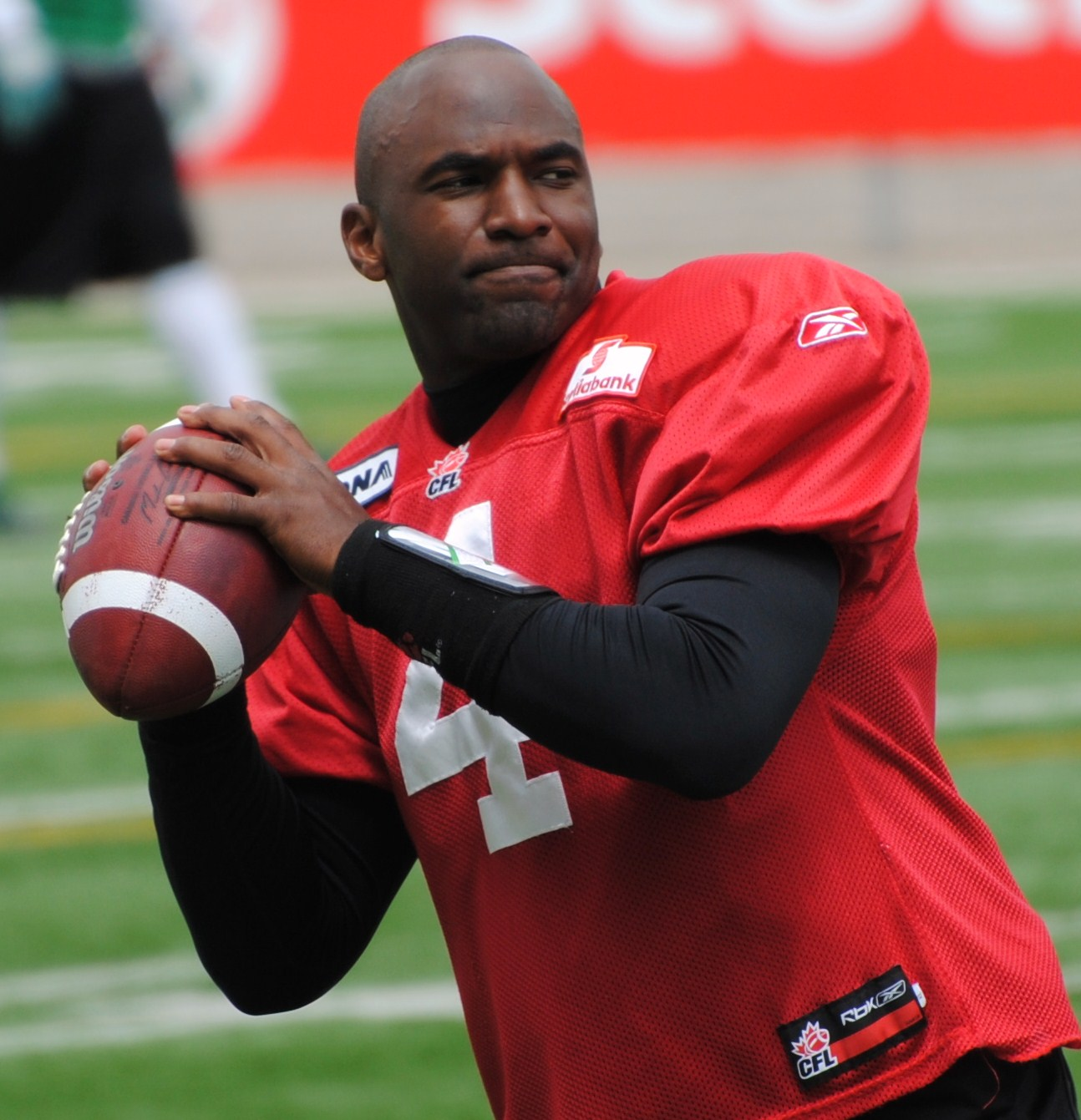
- Durant with the Saskatchewan Roughriders in 2010

No. 14, 4
- Position: Quarterback

Personal information
- Born: August 19, 1982 (age 44); Florence, South Carolina, U.S.
- Listed height: 5 ft 11 in (1.80 m)
- Listed weight: 214 lb (97 kg)

Career information
- High school: Wilson (Florence)
- College: North Carolina (2001–2004)
- NFL draft: 2005: undrafted

Career history
- 2005: Baltimore Ravens*
- 2006–2016: Saskatchewan Roughriders
- 2017: Montreal Alouettes
- 2018: Winnipeg Blue Bombers*
- * Offseason or practice squad member only

Awards and highlights
- 2× Grey Cup champion (2007, 2013); 2× CFL West All-Star (2009, 2013); CFL passing yards leader (2010); CFL passing touchdowns leader (2013); CFL record for most consecutive pass attempts without an interception (323)

Career CFL statistics
- Passing completions: 2,500
- Passing attempts: 4,001
- Percentage: 62.5
- TD–INT: 164–115
- Passing yards: 31,740
- Passer rating: 88.9
- Stats at CFL.ca

Darian Bernard Durant (born August 19, 1982) is an American former professional football quarterback who played in the Canadian Football League (CFL) from 2006 to 2017. He played college football at the University of North Carolina. By the end of his college career, he held school records for completion percentage, touchdowns, passing yards, total offense and completions. Durant was signed as a free agent by the Saskatchewan Roughriders in 2006, and became the club's full-time starting quarterback in 2009. He was named a CFL West Division All-Star in 2009 and 2013. Durant was the starting quarterback when the Roughriders won the 101st Grey Cup in 2013 on their home field. Durant also played for the Montreal Alouettes in 2017. His brother Justin played in the National Football League as a linebacker.

== Early life ==
Durant was born on August 19, 1982, in Florence, South Carolina to Betty and Israel Durant. He has three brothers and a sister. His younger brother, Justin, played for the NFL's Dallas Cowboys, and his older brother, Keyshawn, was a quarterback at South Carolina State.

Durant attended high school at Wilson High School in Florence, South Carolina. During his senior year of high school, he led the team to South Carolina's 4-A state semi-finals. Durant set a school record with 2,446 passing yards and tied his own record with 25 touchdown passes, which was set during his sophomore season. He was named a Super Prep All-America, Honorable Mention All-America by USA Today and Prep Star All-Region selection. He also played in the South Carolina All-Star game, where he completed 9 of his 11 passing attempts for 215 yards.

== College career ==
Durant signed a letter of intent to play college football at the University of North Carolina in 2000. In 2001, during his first NCAA season, Durant established school freshman records with 17 touchdown passes, 142 completions, 1843 passing yards and 1971 yards of total offense. His freshman records for passing yards and completions were broken in 2007 by T. J. Yates. During his freshman season, Durant was named Atlantic Coast Conference (ACC) Rookie of the Week five times. He finished second overall in ACC Rookie of the Year voting to Florida State quarterback Chris Rix. As a freshman, Durant split time with Ronald Curry, helping the team to a victory in the 2001 Peach Bowl against Auburn. He was awarded the Jeffrey Cowell Memorial Award as the team's top freshman.

After his college career, Durant was one of the most accomplished athletes in the school's history. He held 51 offensive records at the school. During his sophomore season, Durant set the school's single-game record for passing yards with 417 during a victory against Arizona State. In his junior year, he set single-season records with 389 passing attempts, 234 completions and 2,551 passing yards. Durant had set UNC records with 1,159 passing attempts, 701 completions, 68 passing touchdowns, 8,755 passing yards and 9,630 yards of total offense. While playing football at the University of North Carolina, Durant completed a degree in African-American studies.

== Professional football ==
=== NFL ===
Durant was undrafted in the 2005 NFL draft, but signed a free agent contract with the Baltimore Ravens and attended their training camp. He was briefly on the team's practice squad, but was cut during the 2005 season because of concerns about his size.

=== CFL ===
A September 4, 2002 Vancouver Sun article mentions that Durant was on the negotiation list of the BC Lions. He was "among some of the more intriguing quarterback names" on their list.

Circa 2004, Durant was on the Ottawa Renegades negotiation list when Eric Tillman was the team's general manager.

On April 9, 2006, the CFL announced that it had suspended the operations of the Renegades while the search for new ownership continued, and that a dispersal draft would be held. The Hamilton Tiger-Cats acquired Durant's negotiation list rights.

==== Saskatchewan Roughriders ====
===== 2006 =====
Prior to the Renegades dispersal draft, the Tiger-Cats and Saskatchewan Roughriders made a trade:

To Saskatchewan	To Hamilton
Hamilton's First Overall Pick in Dispersal Draft	Corey Holmes
Hamilton's Negotiation List Quarterback Darian Durant	Scott Gordon
	Saskatchewan's First Round pick in 2007 CFL draft
	Saskatchewan's Negotiation List Quarterback Reggie Ball

The Roughriders used the first overall pick in the dispersal draft to acquire quarterback Kerry Joseph. Durant signed with the team on May 11, 2006. In 2006, General Manager, Roy Shivers, who signed Durant, and Head Coach, Danny Barrett, were in the final year of their tenure with the Roughriders. Durant wore #10 during training camp and #14 during the season. Coming out of training camp, the Roughrider quarterback depth chart from 1 to 4 was Joseph, Marcus Crandell, Rocky Butler, and Durant. Because of injuries, Durant served as the team's backup quarterback for eight games, completing a single pass for 14 yards and recording a single rushing attempt for 20 yards in a game against Hamilton. Durant was on the team's practice roster for the remaining ten games. Shivers was replaced by Tillman in August. The Roughriders finished 9-9, third place in the West. Saskatchewan ultimately lost the West Final to BC 45–18.

===== 2007 =====
For the 2007 season, Tillman hired a new head coach, Kent Austin. Austin hired Ken Miller as offensive coordinator. Austin was the last quarterback to lead the Roughriders to a Grey Cup victory, 1989. The quarterback depth chart was Joseph, Crandell, Durant, and Drew Tate, who spent the season on the practice roster. Durant spent the entire season on the active roster, and was available for all of the Roughrider regular season and playoff games, but did not see any game action while serving as the team's third-string quarterback. He was on the sidelines as starting quarterback Joseph won the CFL Most Outstanding Player award, led the Roughriders to their first 12 win regular season since 1970, their first home playoff game since 1988, won their first home playoff game since 1976, appeared in their first Grey Cup since 1997, and won their first Grey Cup since 1989. The Roughriders defeated the Winnipeg Blue Bombers in the Grey Cup 23–19, and Durant was one of the players who gave Austin a Gatorade shower after the game.

===== 2008 =====
Prior to the 2008 season, Austin left to become the offensive coordinator at his Alma mater, Ole Miss. He was replaced by Miller, and Paul LaPolice became the offensive coordinator. Joseph was traded to the Toronto Argonauts. The Roughriders also acquired quarterback Steven Jyles from the Edmonton Eskimos and retained Tate in reserve. Durant changed his number to #4, the number Joseph had worn for the previous two seasons.

Crandell began the season as the starting quarterback, Jyles was the backup, and Durant was third string. In game 2 against BC, Crandell sustained an injury, and Jyles struggled in relief, so Durant finished the game. The Roughriders won 26–16. Durant started the next three games, all victories. He sustained a rib injury in his third start, a game against the Toronto Argonauts, and the team went back to Crandell.

When Crandell returned, he struggled and was released in August. During this time, Tillman acquired quarterback Michael Bishop, who had been sharing quarterbacking duties with Joseph in Toronto. Late in the season, Durant, Jyles, and Bishop started and saw significant playing time in three consecutive weeks. Bishop started the West Semi-Final against BC, threw three interceptions and was unable to generate a touchdown. Durant played in the late stages of the game. The Roughriders lost 33–12. Bishop was released shortly after the season was finished.

Despite starting four different starting quarterbacks (Crandell, Jyles, Durant, and Bishop), the Roughriders won 12 games and hosted the West Semi-Final. Durant started four games and played in four others, gaining seven passing touchdowns, and one rushing touchdown.

In January 2009, Durant signed a new contract with the Roughriders rather than becoming a free agent.

===== 2009 =====
Going into the 2009 season, Crandell and Bishop were no longer quarterbacks with the team, and Tate had joined the Calgary Stampeders. At the time of Durant re-signing, Tillman promised Durant that he would be "the lead rabbit" for the starting quarterback position at training camp, but that it was going to be an open competition for the spot. Crandell was a guest coach at Roughriders training camp, and on July 7, joined the team's coaching staff as an offensive assistant coach to work primarily with the team's quarterbacks. Durant entered the season as the club's starting quarterback, but Miller gave backup Jyles significant playing time as well.

Durant made the most of his opportunity, becoming the first Roughrider quarterback to start all 18 regular season games since Austin did it in 1992. Durant's consistency on the field was one of the reasons he earned the Roughriders' starting quarterback position, along with his ability to run for yards when his pass protection breaks down. Durant was named the Roughriders nominee for CFL Most Outstanding Player, and was selected a West Division All-Star at quarterback. He was also named the Roughriders' Wireless Age Most Popular Player.

Saskatchewan played Calgary in the final game of the regular season, where the winner would take first place in the West Division. Saskatchewan won this game 30–14, and finished in first place for the first time since 1976. Saskatchewan won the West Final over Calgary 27–17, a game in which Durant threw three touchdowns, and qualified for their second Grey Cup in three years. In the Grey Cup game, Durant ran for a touchdown in the fourth quarter that put Saskatchewan up 27–11 over Montreal. However, Montreal was able to score 17 unanswered points. On the last play of the game, Montreal's Damon Duval attempted a field goal, but missed. However, Saskatchewan had too many men on the field, so Montreal got a second chance at the field goal. Duval made this field goal, and Montreal won 28–27.

Durant finished the 2009 season with 4,348 passing yards and 501 rushing yards. Durant threw 24 touchdown passes during the season and also had 21 interceptions, leading the CFL. Heading into the 2010 season, Durant wanted to cut down on his interceptions, although he tried to be optimistic, "I throw 21 picks last year and I guarantee every guy with better stats than me wishes they were in the Grey Cup."

===== 2010 =====
In 2010, LaPolice became the head coach of the Winnipeg Blue Bombers and Jyles joined him. LaPolice was replaced by Doug Berry. Berry had coached Anthony Calvillo in Montreal and Kevin Glenn in Winnipeg when they put up career high statistics. Crandell was on the coaching staff for the second straight season. To start the season, Saskatchewan hosted Montreal in a Grey Cup rematch, which was held on Canada Day and kicked off the CFL season. Durant and the Roughriders staged a second half comeback to defeat the Montreal 54–51 in overtime. He threw the winning touchdown to Weston Dressler. Durant threw five touchdown passes and picked up 478 passing yards during the game. For his efforts, he was named the CFL's Offensive Player of the Week.

On August 6, the Roughriders played in Montreal. Durant had been suffering from a stomach ailment, but was still able to go 35-62-445 passing. His 62 pass attempts tied for third highest in a single game in CFL history.

At the halfway point of the season, Durant had thrown 11 touchdown passes and 14 interceptions, while rushing for another five touchdowns.

On September 17, Durant engineered a come-from-behind overtime victory over Calgary. In this game, he threw for 500 yards, Durant's career high, and the fifth highest single game yardage total in Roughrider history. The CFL named Durant Offensive Player of the Month for September after a month where he passed for 1387 yards and five touchdowns.

After Game 17 versus the BC Lions, Durant became only the second Roughrider quarterback to throw for over 5,000 yards in a season, with the first being Austin. Durant was selected as the Roughriders' nominee for the CFL Most Outstanding Player Award.

Durant led the Roughriders to a 10–8 regular season record. In the West Semi-Final, he threw the winning touchdown in overtime to Jason Clermont, who scored his first touchdown as a Roughrider. The Roughriders defeated Clermont's former team 41–38. The following week, the Roughriders went into Calgary and defeated the Stampeders in West Final, 20–16. In the Grey Cup, the Roughriders played Montreal for the second consecutive year. Late in the fourth quarter, with the Roughriders down by three points, Durant was hit as he threw, and the pass was intercepted by Billy Parker. Montreal held on to win 21–18, and became back-to-back champions.

This season, these career highs occurred for Durant:

- Longest pass completion: 87
- Longest rush: 35

These season career highs also led the league in 2010:

- Total Game starts: 21 (18 regular season, 2 playoff, 1 Grey Cup)
- Pass attempts: 644
- Pass completions: 391
- Pass yards: 5,542
- Single game pass yards: 500
- Regular season 300+ yard passing games: 10
- Total 300+ yard passing games: 11 (10 regular season, 1 playoff)
- Interceptions: 22
- Fumbles: 13 (tied league lead)
- Fumbles lost: 7

In quarterback rushing statistics, these season career highs led the CFL:

- Rush attempts: 80
- Rush yards: 618
- Rush touchdowns: 7

===== 2011 =====
Prior to the 2011 campaign, Miller stepped down as head coach to focus on his administrative duties. He hired Greg Marshall to be the head coach, and Berry was retained as offensive coordinator. Crandell joined Edmonton's coaching staff as offensive coordinator. The season was a let down year not only for Durant but also for the Roughriders as a whole. The Riders stumbled out of the gate losing seven of their first eight games. Marshall and Berry were fired after the team's eighth game, and Miller returned to the sidelines. Durant's production fell significantly through the course of the season. Near the end of the season Durant was playing with a broken bone in his foot, which ultimately led to him missing the last two games of the regular season. The Riders would finish the year with only 5 wins and 13 losses, placing them in last place in the league. Despite the reduced production in 2011, on April 27, 2012, the Riders extended his contract through the 2014 CFL season.

===== 2012 =====
For the 2012 season, Miller moved on and Corey Chamblin became the Roughriders Head Coach. Bob Dyce became the offensive coordinator and Khari Jones was the quarterbacks coach. The Roughriders started the season 3–0, and Durant did not throw an interception. Durant helped guide the Roughriders to a 52–0 shutout of Winnipeg in the Labour Day Classic. Unfortunately, he suffered a sprained neck early in the third quarter. In the Banjo Bowl the following week, he suffered a hip flexor injury early in the first half, and Drew Willy would get significant playing time, and make his first CFL start the week after against the Montreal Alouettes. Durant was 8–8 as a starting quarterback, and helped guide the Roughriders back to the playoffs. In the West Semi-Final against Calgary, Durant was 24 of 37 for 435 yards, 4 touchdowns, and 2 interceptions. Durant's former Roughrider teammate, quarterback Drew Tate, threw a last minute touchdown to Romby Bryant, and the Roughriders lost 36–30.

===== 2013 =====
In 2013 season, Dyce was reassigned to special teams coordinator, and George Cortez, who had been the Roughrider offensive line coach in Durant's rookie season, became the Roughrider offensive coordinator. This season was one of the best season of Durant's career: he set career highs in touchdowns, with 31, while limiting his interceptions to only 12. He began the year having attempted 212 consecutive pass attempts without being intercepted joining Dave Dickenson and later Ricky Ray as the only quarterback in CFL history to start 7 consecutive games without throwing an interception. His first interception did not come until game 9, the Labour Day Classic. He also set a career-high for passer rating with 95.7 (excluding his 2006 season in which he only completed one pass). He led the Riders to an 11–7 record and home-field in the Western Semi-Finals against the BC Lions where several of his rushing plays won the game for the Riders. After beating Calgary in the Western Final, Durant led the Riders to their fourth Grey Cup championship on their home turf at Mosaic Stadium.

===== 2014 =====
In 2014, Durant was the starting quarterback for the Roughriders first ten games. His record was 8-2 and the Roughriders were in second place in the West. However, injuries took their toll three times in the span of four games. Against Montreal in the Roughriders' seventh game, Durant threw a fourth quarter touchdown to Rob Bagg. On the play, he absorbed a hard, unexpected hit from John Bowman just after he released his throw. Durant appeared to be labouring as he walked off the field, but was back under centre for the Riders' next offensive possession. The following week, in BC, Durant injured his right throwing hand in the first half, and backup quarterback Tino Sunseri played the second half. Two weeks later, in the Banjo Bowl, Durant suffered a torn tendon in his right elbow, which required surgery. As a result, Durant was added to the Roughrider 6 game injury list and missed the remainder of the season. Joseph, now 41 years old, was brought back to quarterback the Roughriders into the playoffs.

===== 2015 =====
Durant returned from injury to start the 2015 season. The Roughriders hired a new offensive coordinator, Jacques Chapdelaine. Durant referred to Chapdelaine's offence as "basketball on grass". In the first game of the season, against Winnipeg, Durant was 13 of 18 for 165 yards, 2 touchdowns, and 0 interceptions late in the first half. However, in the final minute of the half, he suffered a ruptured Achilles tendon, and missed the rest of the season. Saskatchewan started 0–9. At that time, Chamblin and general manager, Brendan Taman were fired, replaced on an interim basis by Dyce and Jeremy O'Day respectively. The Roughriders finished with a league-worst 3–15 record.

===== 2016 =====
For the 2016 season, the Roughriders hired Chris Jones to be the general manager and head coach. Jones had been the head coach in Edmonton when they won the Grey Cup the year prior. On January 20, 2016, it was announced that Durant had agreed to a new one-year contract with the Roughriders. Durant rehabbed his Achilles tendon injury, and was the team's starting quarterback in game 1 against the Toronto Argonauts. The Roughriders lost 30–17, but Durant was able to play the entire game, going 31 of 48 for 310 yards, 1 touchdown, and 0 interceptions. He also rushed 5 times for 15 yards, and caught one of his deflected passes and gained 3 yards. Early in the second quarter of the fourth week, Durant left the game after BC defensive linemen Mic'hael Brooks fell into his leg on a passing play. He was taken into the Riders locker room and later appeared on the sidelines using crutches. Following the game the X-Rays revealed no structural damage, and Durant was considered day-to-day with an ankle sprain. Durant ending up only missing two weeks returning as the starting quarterback in Week 7. By the August 20 game in Hamilton, Durant had thrown 323 consecutive pass attempts without an interception, a CFL record.

The Roughriders started 1–10. However, with Durant starting, the Roughriders won their next four games, improving to 5–10. The team failed to make the playoffs for the second consecutive season. The Roughriders' final home game, against BC, was the final home game for historic Taylor Field. In this game, Durant started, but shared playing time with Jake Waters. Waters left the game with a collarbone injury, and Durant finished the game. Saskatchewan lost 24–6. Durant was a part of the ceremony that closed out the stadium.

Since the Roughriders had already been eliminated from the playoffs, Durant was rested for the final game of the regular season against BC. The team wanted to see their other quarterbacks (Brandon Bridge, Mitchell Gale, and G.J. Kinne) get some playing time. Following the conclusion of the regular season, Durant expressed his disappointment that contract negotiations with the Roughriders had stalled. If no deal had been reached, Durant would have been a free-agent when the free agency period commenced on 14 February 2017. On January 5, 2017, the Riders made a new offer to Durant. The offer reportedly included a base salary of around $300,000, with performance incentives set to reach $400,000 in 2017.

==== Montreal Alouettes ====
After the Roughriders were unable to agree upon terms with Durant, his rights were traded to the Montreal Alouettes on January 13, 2017, for a fourth-round pick in the 2017 CFL draft and a conditional second-round pick in the 2018 CFL draft. On January 19, 2017, Durant and the Alouettes agreed to a three-year contract extension, preventing him from becoming a free-agent in mid-February. He was reunited with Kavis Reed, Montreal's general manager who had been an assistant coach with Saskatchewan in 2009, and Jacques Chapdelaine, Montreal's head coach who had been Durant's offensive coordinator in 2015. Durant struggled in his first season in Montreal. He started 15 games for the Als, but only managed to win three games. Durant was the second lowest rated starting quarterback according to the CFL's QUAR rating system. He threw more interceptions (16) than touchdowns (15) for the first time in his career, and his passer rating was the lowest it had been since his 2011 season. With Durant set to receive a roster bonus of $150,000 on January 15, 2018, the Alouettes sent Durant an ultimatum on January 10, 2018; informing him he needed to agree restructure his contract or he would be released. After failing to restructure his deal Durant was released by the Alouettes on January 15, 2018.

==== Winnipeg Blue Bombers ====
Durant agreed to terms on a one-year contract with the Winnipeg Blue Bombers on January 20, 2018. On May 11, 2018, Darian Durant announced his retirement from professional football. Durant's retirement surprised the Bombers who were expecting Durant to begin the season as the backup to Matt Nichols.

== CFL career statistics ==
=== Regular season ===
		Passing									Rushing
Year	Team	Games	Started	Att	Comp	Pct	Yards	TD	Int	Rating	Att	Yards	Avg	Long	TD	Fumb
2006	SSK	8	0	1	1	100.0	14	0	0	143.8	1	20	20.0	20	0	0
2007	SSK	18	0	0	0	0.0	0	0	0	0	0	0	0.0	0	0	0
2008	SSK	15	4	129	77	59.7	1,122	7	6	86.8	27	204	7.6	25	1	1
2009	SSK	18	18	561	339	60.4	4,348	24	21	83.4	60	501	8.4	25	3	6
2010	SSK	18	18	644	391	60.7	5,542	25	22	87.2	80	618	7.7	35	7	13
2011	SSK	18	15	489	299	61.1	3,653	18	14	84.5	55	381	6.9	22	2	9
2012	SSK	18	16	486	313	64.4	3,878	20	12	92.4	32	342	10.7	27	1	5
2013	SSK	18	16	531	325	61.2	4,154	31	12	95.7	42	369	8.8	27	1	9
2014	SSK	10	10	228	138	60.5	1,792	8	5	87.8	21	179	8.5	17	1	1
2015	SSK	1	1	18	13	72.2	165	2	0	137.5	0	0	0.0	0	0	0
2016	SSK	15	15	496	330	66.5	3,839	14	7	93.3	57	308	5.4	25	6	9
2017	MTL	17	15	417	274	65.7	3,233	15	16	85.1	27	182	6.7	19	1	3
SSK totals		157	113	3,584	2,226	62.1	28,507	149	99	89.3	375	2,922	7.8	35	22	53
CFL totals		174	128	4,001	2,500	62.5	31,740	164	115	88.9	402	3,104	7.7	35	23	56

=== Playoffs ===
Year & game	Team	GP	GS	ATT	COMP	YD	TD	INT	RUSH	YD	TD
2006 West Semi-Final	SSK	0	-	-	-	-	-	-	-	-	-
2006 West Final	SSK	0	-	-	-	-	-	-	-	-	-
2007 West Semi-Final	SSK	1	0	0	-	-	-	-	0	-	-
2007 West Final	SSK	1	0	0	-	-	-	-	0	-	-
2008 West Semi-Final	SSK	1	0	7	3	62	0	0	0	-	-
2009 West Final	SSK	1	1	25	18	204	3	0	5	29	0
2010 West Semi-Final	SSK	1	1	37	20	310	3	0	3	14	0
2010 West Final	SSK	1	1	36	20	180	2	1	6	51	0
2012 West Semi-Final	SSK	1	1	37	24	435	4	2	3	25	0
2013 West Semi-Final	SSK	1	1	23	19	270	2	0	6	97	0
2013 West Final	SSK	1	1	30	24	280	3	0	4	18	0
2014 West Semi-Final	SSK	0	-	-	-	-	-	-	-	-	-
Totals		9	6	195	128	1741	17	3	27	234	0

=== Grey Cup ===
Year	Team	GP	GS	ATT	COMP	YD	TD	INT	RUSH	YD	TD
2007	SSK	1	0	0	-	-	-	-	0	-	-
2009	SSK	1	1	29	17	201	1	2	4	57	1
2010	SSK	1	1	31	18	215	1	1	1	8	0
2013	SSK	1	1	24	17	245	3	0	7	26	0
Totals		4	3	84	52	661	5	3	12	91	1

== Post-football career ==
In 2023, the 2013 Grey Cup team was inducted into the Saskatchewan Roughrider Plaza of Honour, and Durant returned to Saskatchewan for the celebrations.

In 2024, Durant was inducted into the Plaza of Honour, and one of the other inductees was Shivers.

== Personal life ==
Durant has a tattoo on his left biceps reading "Against all odds – I'm gonna shine", which Durant believes explains his life. Durant's teammates and coaches describe him as a fierce competitor, who battles through injuries and illnesses. In conjunction with a local Ford dealer, and to commemorate the Roughriders' 100th anniversary, Durant lent his name to a limited edition Ford F-150 truck that was sold in Regina. The Durant limited edition featured a Durant license plate, his DD4 logo, Roughriders mud flaps and embossed head rests. There are only four of the trucks available, and $500 from the sale of each truck goes to support Durant's charity of choice, KidSport.
