= Bob Laycoe =

Biographical details
- Born: October 9, 1947; Vancouver, British Columbia, Canada
- Died: December 28, 2020 (aged 73)

Playing career

Football
- 1964–1967: Linfield
- 1968: UBC
- Position: Tackle/Defensive tackle

Coaching career (HC unless noted)

Football
- 1969–1971: Saskatchewan (OL)
- 1972: Saskatchewan
- 1973–1987: UBC (DC)
- 1988–2001: Toronto

Wrestling
- 1969–1972: Saskatchewan
- 1973–1979: UBC

Accomplishments and honors

Championships
- As a head coach: 1× Vanier Cup champion (1993); As an assistant coach: 2× Vanier Cup champion (1982, 1986)

Robert Laycoe (October 9, 1947 – December 28, 2020) was a Canadian football coach who was the head coach of the Toronto Varsity Blues football team from 1988 to 2001.

== Early life ==
Laycoe was the son of National Hockey League coach Hal Laycoe. From 1964 to 1968, Laycoe attended Linfield College, where he was an all-district offensive tackle. He then spent one year at the University of British Columbia, where he played offensive and defensive tackle for the UBC Thunderbirds football team and won the Canadian college and open heavyweight wrestling championships as a member of the UBC wrestling team.

== Coaching ==
In 1969, Laycoe became the wrestling and offensive line coach at the University of Saskatchewan. He was the school's acting athletic director in 1971 and was promoted to head football coach the following year after the departure of Al Ledingham.

In 1973, Laycoe returned to UBC as head coach of the wrestling team and assistant football coach. He also taught a full academic schedule in the School of Kinesiology and was involved in academic planning for the school. From 1973 to 1979, Laycoe's wrestling team won four Western Canadian titles. In 1978, he was named CIS Wrestling Coach of the Year. As defensive coordinator of the football team, he helped lead the Thunderbirds to four Vanier Cup appearances and national championships in 1982 and 1986.

In 1988, Laycoe was named head football coach at the University of Toronto. In his fourteen seasons with the Varsity Blues, Laycoe compiled a 54-69-2 record and led the team to the Yates Cup and Vanier Cup championships in 1993. Fourteen of his were selected in the CFL draft including Rob Crifo, Chris Morris, and Jung-Yul Kim. He died on December 28, 2020 after a long battle with Parkinson's disease.
