= Darrell Adams =

American gridiron football player and coach (born 1983)

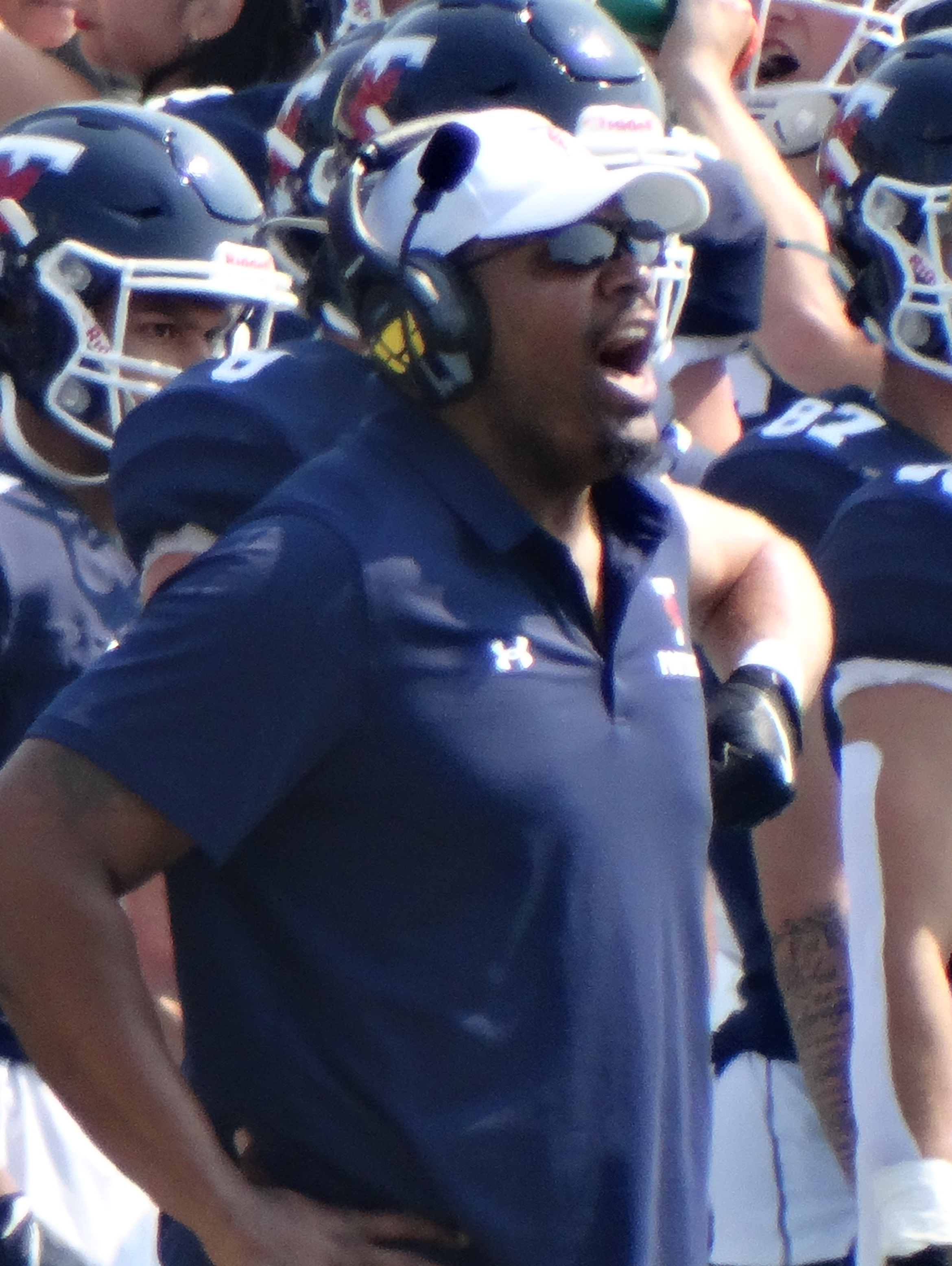
- Adams with the Toronto Varsity Blues in 2024

Personal information
- Born: September 16, 1983 (age 43); Jamaica, New York, U.S.
- Listed height: 6 ft 5 in (1.96 m)
- Listed weight: 282 lb (128 kg)

Career information
- Position: Defensive tackle
- High school: Islip High
- College: Villanova

Career history

Playing
- New York Jets (2006–2007)*; Hamilton Tiger-Cats (2007–2009)
- * Offseason or practice squad member only

Coaching
- Hamilton Tiger-Cats (2011–2012) Assistant defensive line coach; Carleton Ravens (2013–2015) Defensive line coach; Waterloo Warriors (2016) Special teams coordinator; Waterloo Warriors (2017–2023) Defensive coordinator; Waterloo Warriors (2021–2023) Assistant head coach; Toronto Varsity Blues (2024–2026) Head coach

Operations
- Waterloo Warriors (2016–2023) Recruiting coordinator

Awards and highlights
- 3× First-team All-A-10 (2003–2005)

Career CFL statistics as of 2009
- Games played: 27
- Defensive tackles: 60
- Sacks: 11
- Stats at CFL.ca (archived)

Darrell Adams (born September 16, 1983) is a former professional gridiron football defensive tackle and was most recently the head coach for the Toronto Varsity Blues of U Sports football. He played professionally for the Hamilton Tiger-Cats of the Canadian Football League (CFL) for three seasons. He was signed by the New York Jets as an undrafted free agent in 2006.

== College career ==
Adams played college football for the Villanova Wildcats from 2001 to 2005. He was named a First-team All-Atlantic 10 in 2003, 2004 and 2005.

== Professional career ==
=== New York Jets ===
After going unselected in the 2006 NFL draft, Adams signed as an undrafted free agent with the New York Jets in May 2006. He participated in training camp and the preseason, but was waived with the final cuts on September 2, 2006. He was re-signed to a practice roster agreement on December 6, 2006, where he remained to end the season.

Adams was signed to a reserve/future contract in January 2007. However, he was released near the end of pre-season on August 27, 2007.

=== Hamilton Tiger-Cats ===
On September 2, 2007, Adams was signed by the Hamilton Tiger-Cats. He played in two regular season games in 2007, where he had two defensive tackles. Adams had a breakout year during the 2008 season where he played in 16 regular season games and had 41 defensive tackles, including five tackles for a loss, nine sacks, and one forced fumble.

In 2009, he played in nine regular season games where he had 17 defensive tackles, two sacks, and three tackles for losses. He signed a contract extension on January 6, 2010. However, during 2010 training camp, he announced his retirement on June 8, 2010, noting that he was not able to continue playing. He finished his playing career having appeared in 27 games, recording 60 defensive tackles and 11 sacks.

== Coaching career ==
=== Hamilton Tiger-Cats ===
Adams joined the coaching staff of the Hamilton Tiger-Cats for the 2011 season as the team's strength & conditioning coordinator and assistant defensive line coach.

=== Carleton Ravens ===
In 2013, Adams moved to CIS football and the expansion Carleton Ravens where he was hired as the team's strength & conditioning coordinator and defensive line coach. During his three-year stint with the Ravens, he was also a recruiter for student-athletes from Ontario and Quebec.

=== Waterloo Warriors ===
On February 26, 2016, it was announced that Adams had joined the Waterloo Warriors as the team's special teams, recruiting and video coordinator. After one season, he was promoted to defensive coordinator for the 2017 season, while also retaining the title of recruiting coordinator. The defence saw immediate improvement, as they moved from 435 points allowed in 2016 to 339 points allowed in 2017. In 2021, Adams added the title of assistant head coach.

=== Toronto Varsity Blues ===
On January 5, 2024, it was announced that Adams had been hired as the head coach for the Toronto Varsity Blues. On October 7, 2026, it was announced that Adams had been placed on leave. After three seasons and a record of 2–22, it was officially announced on November 11, 2026, that Adams was relieved of his coaching duties.

== Personal life ==
Adams and his wife, Amrita, live in Mississauga and have one son and one daughter.

== Head coaching record ==
| Year | Team | Overall | Conference | Standing | Bowl/playoffs |
|---|---|---|---|---|---|
Toronto Varsity Blues (OUA) (2024–present)
| 2024 | Toronto | 1–7 | 1–7 | 10th | |
| 2025 | Toronto | 1–7 | 1–7 | 11th | |
| 2026 | Toronto | 0–8 | 0–8 | 11th | |
| Toronto: | | 2–22 | 2–22 | | |
| Total: | | 2–22 | | | |
