= Red and Blue Bowl =

Canadian rivalry football game

- The 2026 Red and Blue Bowl

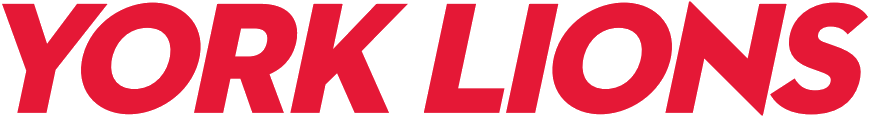
- York Lions Toronto Varsity Blues
- Sport: Canadian football
- First meeting: September 14, 1970; Toronto 36, York 0
- Latest meeting: October 17, 2026; York 34, Toronto 10
- Stadiums: Varsity Stadium (1970–present); York Lions Stadium (2015–present)
- Trophy: Argo Cup

Statistics
- Total meetings: 56
- All-time series (U Sports only): 34–22
- Largest victory: Toronto, 70–0 (2014)
- Longest win streak: Toronto, 14 (1970–1983)
- Current win streak: York, 3 (2024–present)
- Locations of both universities' main campuses in Toronto

The Red and Blue Bowl, sometimes known as the Argo Cup, is an annual Canadian football game between two OUA football teams in Toronto: the York Lions football team of York University and the Toronto Varsity Blues football team of the University of Toronto.

The winning team is presented with the Argo Cup, a trophy donated by the Toronto Argonauts professional football team in 1992.

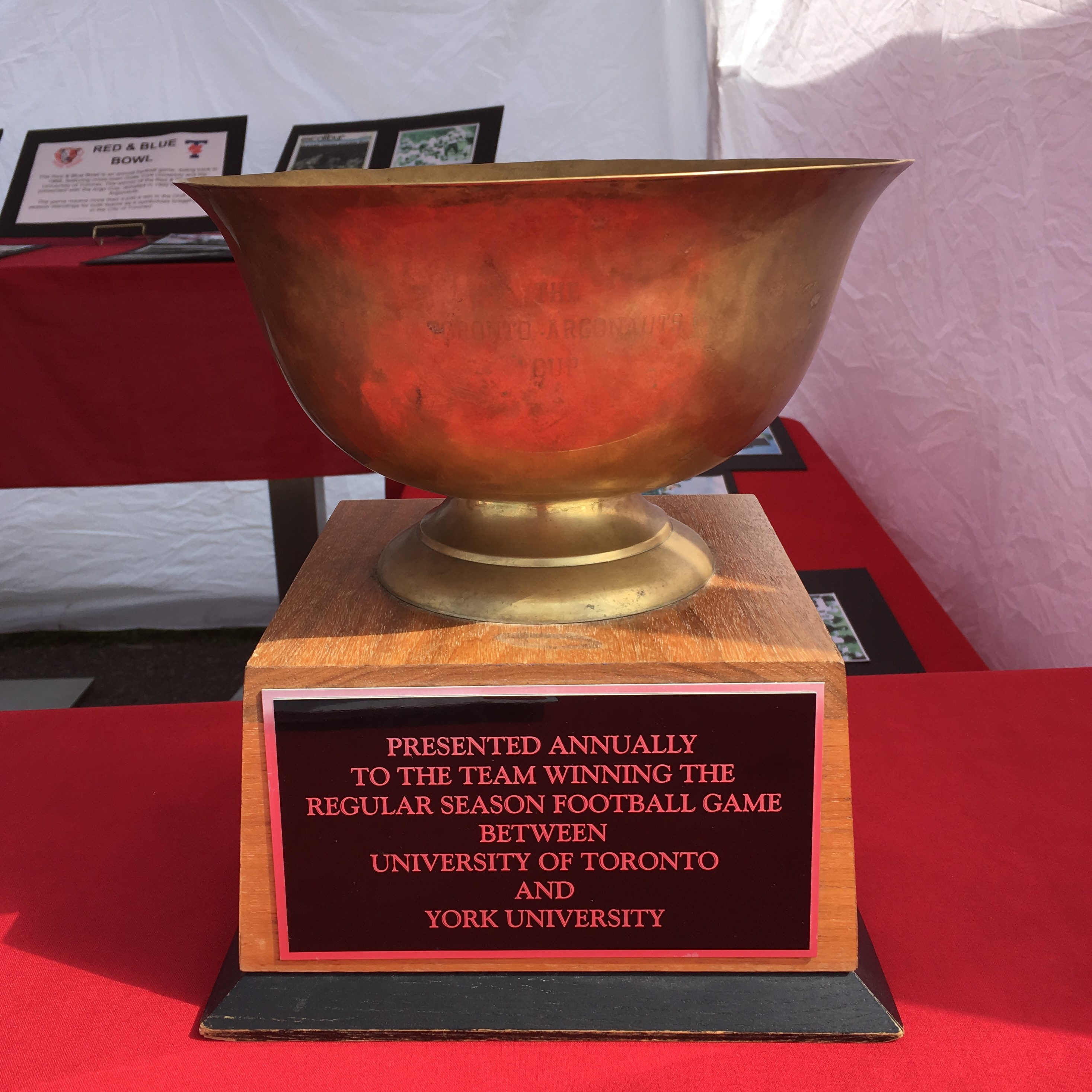
The Argo Cup, awarded to the winning team of the Red and Blue Bowl

York and U of T are the only universities in Toronto with varsity football teams and are described as cross-town rivals, with the winner of the Red and Blue Bowl allowed bragging rights of the city.

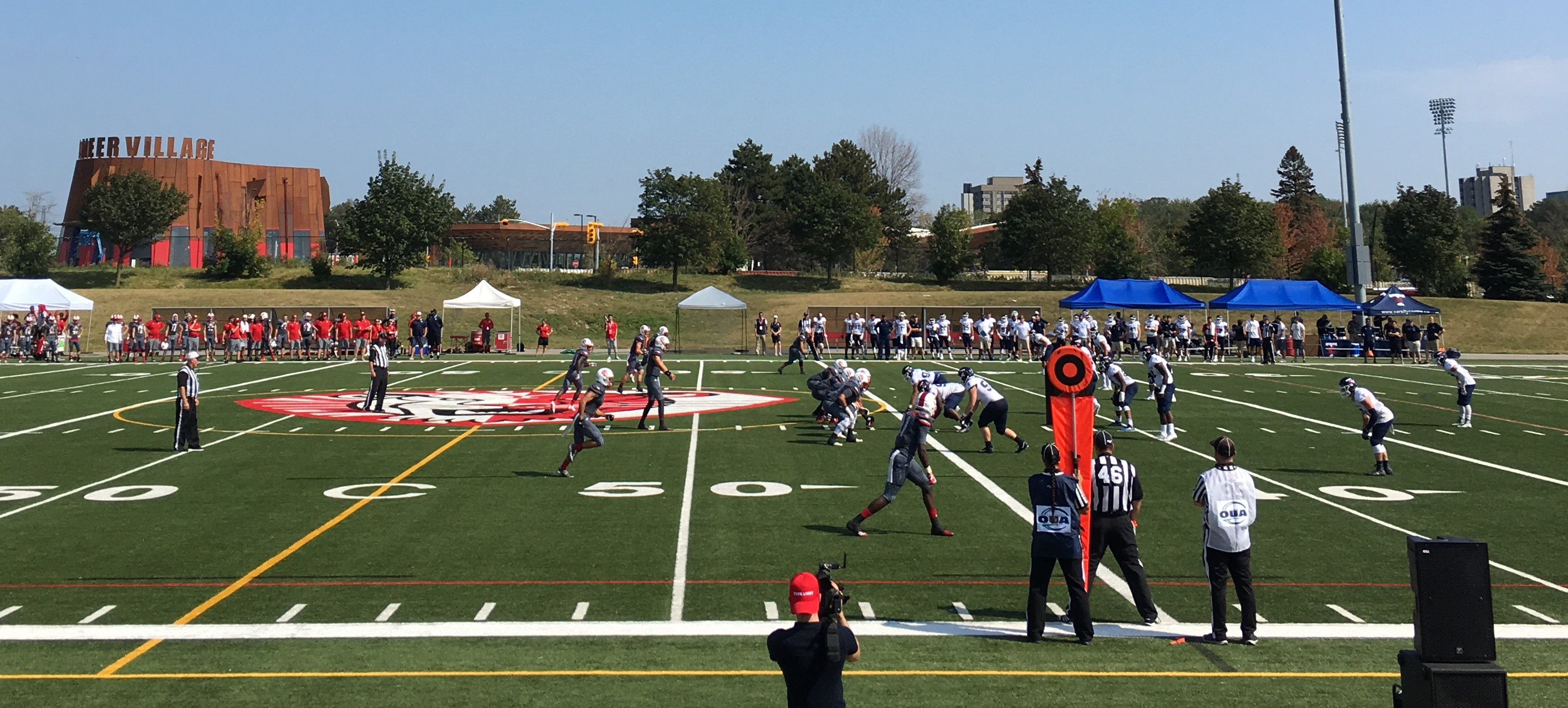
The 2017 Red and Blue Bowl

The 2021 Red and Blue Bowl

== History ==
The first meeting between the two teams occurred on September 11, 1970, which was an exhibition match won by the Varsity Blues. At a time when Toronto was a dominant program, the Blues won the first 14 match ups until the Lions (formerly known as the Yeomen) won their first Red and Blue Bowl game in 1984. York's longest stretch of dominance began in 1996 when the Lions won their first of 12 consecutive matches, which ended after their 2007 victory. Overall, as of the 2026 season, the Varsity Blues hold a 34–22 record in the Red and Blue Bowl.

== Game results ==
York victories	Toronto victories

No.	Date	Location	Winner	Score
1	Sept. 14, 1970	Varsity Stadium	Toronto	36–0
2	Sept. 29, 1971	Varsity Stadium	Toronto	24–12
3	Sept. 11, 1972	CNE Stadium	Toronto	14–7
4	Sept. 15, 1973	CNE Stadium	Toronto	42–19
5	Oct. 12, 1974	CNE Stadium	Toronto	26–7
6	Oct. 10, 1975	Varsity Stadium	Toronto	56–0
7	Oct. 8, 1976	Varsity Stadium	Toronto	34–2
8	Oct. 15, 1977	Varsity Stadium	Toronto	28–6
9	Sept. 9, 1978	York	Toronto	20–0
10	Oct. 4, 1979	Varsity Stadium	Toronto	22–0
11	Oct. 24, 1980	Varsity Stadium	Toronto	37–20
12	Oct. 8, 1981	Varsity Stadium	Toronto	39–9
13	Oct. 8, 1982	Varsity Stadium	Toronto	21–14
14	Oct. 6, 1983	Varsity Stadium	Toronto	49–7
15	Oct. 4, 1984	Varsity Stadium	York	44–20
16	Oct. 10, 1985	Varsity Stadium	York	17–7
17	Oct. 9, 1986	Varsity Stadium	York	24–23
18	Oct. 7, 1987	Varsity Stadium	Toronto	36–7
19	Oct. 8, 1988	Varsity Stadium	Toronto	18–12
20	Oct. 5, 1989	Varsity Stadium	Toronto	27–9
21	Oct. 4, 1990	Varsity Stadium	Toronto	38–0
22	Oct. 10, 1991	Varsity Stadium	Toronto	65–7
23	Oct. 8, 1992	Varsity Stadium	Toronto	40–3
24	Oct. 7, 1993	Varsity Stadium	Toronto	42–20
25	Oct. 6, 1994	Varsity Stadium	Toronto	26–1
26	Oct. 5, 1995	Varsity Stadium	Toronto	20–14
27	Oct. 10, 1996	York Stadium	York	31–3
28	Set. 13, 1997	Varsity Stadium	York	17–7
29	Oct. 24, 1998	Varsity Stadium	York	15–9
30	Sept. 11, 1999	Varsity Stadium	York	47–1
31	Sept. 9, 2000	York Stadium	York	23–3
32	Sept. 15, 2001	York Stadium	York	33–10
33	Sept. 13, 2002	Birchmount Stadium	York	14–6
34	Sept. 27, 2003	York Stadium	York	66–7
35	Sept. 25, 2004	Varsity Stadium	York	45–41
36	Sept. 17, 2005	Varsity Stadium	York	40–33 (OT)
37	Sept. 20, 2006	York Stadium	York	39–11
38	Sept. 29, 2007	York Stadium	York	21–20
39	Sept. 14, 2008	Varsity Stadium	Toronto	58–7
40	Oct. 3, 2009	York Stadium	Toronto	45–27
41	Sept. 18, 2010	Varsity Stadium	Toronto	24–19
42	Sept. 10, 2011	York Stadium	Toronto	10–8
43	Oct. 13, 2012	Varsity Stadium	York	36–24
44	Oct. 10, 2013	York Stadium	Toronto	56–35
45	Sept. 13, 2014	Varsity Stadium	Toronto	70–0
46	Oct. 2, 2015	York Stadium	Toronto	40–3
47	Sept. 17, 2016	Varsity Stadium	Toronto	45–18
48	Sept. 23, 2017	Alumni Field	York	41–16
49	Oct. 20, 2018	Varsity Stadium	York	31–15
50	Oct. 12, 2019	Alumni Field	York	34–14
51	Oct. 16, 2021	Varsity Stadium	Toronto	25–2
52	Sept. 24, 2022	Varsity Stadium	Toronto	39–7
53	Oct. 6, 2023	York Lions Stadium	Toronto	57–3
54	Sept. 21, 2024	Varsity Stadium	York	19–17
55	Sept. 6, 2025	York Lions Stadium	York	33–32 (OT)
56	Oct. 17, 2026	Varsity Stadium	York	34–10
Series: Toronto leads 34–22

== See also ==
- University sports rivalries in Canada
