= Toronto Varsity Blues football =

Football team of the University of Toronto

Toronto Varsity Blues
- Toronto Varsity Blues logo
- First season: 1877
- Athletic director: Beth Ali
- Head coach: Tommy Kanichis (Interim) year, –
- Other staff: Tommy Kanichis (OC); Jykine Bradley (DC)
- Home stadium: Varsity Stadium
- Year built: 2007
- Stadium capacity: 5000
- Stadium surface: Polytan Ligaturf
- Location: Toronto, Ontario
- League: U Sports
- Conference: OUA (1980-present)
- Past associations: ORFU (1883-1897); CIRFU (1898-1970); OUAA (1971-1973); OQIFC (1974-1979)
- All-time record: 549–496–36 (.525)
- Postseason record: 20–27 (.426)

Titles
- Dominion Championships: 2; 1895, 1905
- Grey Cups: 4; 1909, 1910, 1911, 1920
- Vanier Cups: 2; 1965, 1993
- Churchill Bowls: 1; 1993
- Atlantic Bowls: 2; 1962, 1974
- Yates Cups: 25; 1898, 1899, 1901, 1903, 1905, 1908, 1909, 1910, 1911, 1914, 1920, 1921, 1926, 1932, 1933, 1936, 1948, 1951, 1954, 1958, 1965, 1967, 1974, 1983, 1993
- Hec Crighton winners: 4
- Colours: U of T Blue and white
- Fight song: "The Blue and White"
- Mascot: True Blue
- Outfitter: Under Armour
- Rivals: York University (rivalry)
- Website: varsityblues.ca

The Toronto Varsity Blues football team represents the University of Toronto in the sport of Canadian football in U Sports. Dating back to 1877, the Toronto Varsity Blues football program initially competed for the Canadian Dominion Football Championship and won six national titles, including the first Grey Cup game ever held in 1909, as well as winning in 1895, 1905, 1910, 1911, and 1920. After intercollegiate teams no longer competed for the Dominion Championship, the team won the first Vanier Cup ever held in 1965, and then again in 1993 as Canadian national football champions.

The team has 25 Yates Cup championship wins as champions of the Ontario University Athletics conference of the U Sports, a total second only to the Western Mustangs.

One former Toronto Varsity Blues team member participated in the NFL draft; Dan Feraday (Cincinnati Bengals, 1982).

== History ==
=== Early history ===
The first documented game of gridiron football was played at the University of Toronto on November 9, 1861. This game was noted to be a combination of Association football and rugby, which the rules required the player bounce or kick the ball towards the opposing team's goal. The game was played on Queen's Park, which eventually became the site of the Ontario Legislative Building.

The first official team was established in 1877 by J.H. Mayne Campbell, where rugby football rules were adopted. The team officially played their first game against another school in 1879, when they faced the University of Michigan. This game ended in a draw, with no teams scoring points after two 45 minute innings.

The team faced their first game against another Canadian university in 1881 against McGill University, losing two tries to nothing.

In 1883, the University of Toronto football team entered the Ontario Rugby Football Union (ORFU). They remained in the ORFU league until 1898, where they then joined the Canadian Intercollegiate Rugby Football Union (CIRFU). During this year the team won the first Yates Cup.

==== Dominion Championships and Grey Cups ====
The Canadian Dominion Football Championship was first established in 1884, and as the University of Toronto was a member of the ORFU, it qualified to play in these championship games. The team won championship games in 1895 and 1905.

In 1909, the Grey Cup was established and the University of Toronto football team won the inaugural game. The team went on the win additionally in 1910, 1911 and 1920.

=== Recent history ===
In recent years the team has had a string of losses, not qualifying for the playoffs in 20 out of the 22 current seasons.

On October 13, 2007, they set the record for the longest losing streak in Canadian university history, at 49 losses in a row. This losing streak was snapped on September 1, 2008 when they defeated the Waterloo Warriors 18-17 for their first win in almost seven years. The team last posted a winning record in 1995.

The team was led by head coach Greg DeLaval who won his first game with the Blues when the team ended their record-setting losing streak in 2008. In 2010, the Blues posted a remarkable 40-35 win over the second-ranked Ottawa Gee-Gees, which was their first win over a nationally ranked opponent since 1997 against the Waterloo Warriors. The Blues finished with a 3-5 record in 2010, which was their best since the 1996 season when they posted the same mark. The Blues hired Greg Gary as head coach in 2011, and finished with another 3-5 record, once again finishing just out of the playoffs in seventh place. The team took a step back with a 2-6 record in 2012, including home losses to fellow 2-6 teams York and Ottawa. However, in 2013, they finished the season 4-4, the first time since 1993, but failed to make the playoffs. The team again regressed in 2014 with a 2-6 record, but rebounded in 2015 with a slightly improved 3-5 record. The program again failed to gain any momentum and won only two games the following season and then only one game in 2017 along with a last place finish. Gary resigned as head coach following the season's end and Greg Marshall was hired as his replacement. Marshall finished with a winless record in his first year, but the team showed progress in his second season where they finished with a 2-6 record.

The Varsity Blues qualified for the playoffs in 2021 for the first time since 1995 and hosted a playoff game for the first time since 1992. In 2022, the Varsity Blues finished in seventh place with a 4-4 record and again qualified for the playoffs as the OUA expanded the number of playoff teams. After a disappointing 2–6 finish to the 2023 season, it was announced on November 23, 2023, that Marshall would not return as the team's head coach. Darrell Adams was hired as the team's head coach on January 5, 2024.

== Season-by-season record ==
The following is the record of the Toronto Varsity Blues football team since 2000:

Season	Games	Won	Lost	Pct %	PF	PA	Standing	Playoffs
2000	8	0	8	0.000	40	348	8th in OUA	Did not qualify
2001	8	1	7	0.125	92	276	10th in OUA	Did not qualify
2002	8	0	8	0.000	63	364	10th in OUA	Did not qualify
2003	8	0	8	0.000	42	438	10th in OUA	Did not qualify
2004	8	0	8	0.000	82	450	9th in OUA	Did not qualify
2005	8	0	8	0.000	126	433	9th in OUA	Did not qualify
2006	8	0	8	0.000	125	418	10th in OUA	Did not qualify
2007	8	0	8	0.000	111	345	10th in OUA	Did not qualify
2008	8	2	6	0.250	168	272	8th in OUA	Did not qualify
2009	8	1	7	0.125	98	279	9th in OUA	Did not qualify
2010	8	3	5	0.375	140	236	7th in OUA	Did not qualify
2011	8	3	5	0.375	110	189	7th in OUA	Did not qualify
2012	8	2	6	0.250	136	279	9th in OUA	Did not qualify
2013	8	4	4	0.500	230	231	7th in OUA	Did not qualify
2014	8	2	6	0.250	265	321	9th in OUA	Did not qualify
2015	8	3	5	0.375	159	224	7th in OUA	Did not qualify
2016	8	2	6	0.250	155	288	8th in OUA	Did not qualify
2017	8	1	7	0.125	108	308	11th in OUA	Did not qualify
2018	8	0	8	0.000	122	315	11th in OUA	Did not qualify
2019	8	2	6	0.250	222	249	9th in OUA	Did not qualify
2020	Season cancelled due to COVID-19 pandemic							
2021	6	3	3	0.500	112	129	2nd in OUA East	Lost to Ottawa Gee-Gees in quarter-final 17–27
2022	8	4	4	0.500	185	219	7th in OUA	Lost to Queen's Gaels in quarter-final 13–41
2023	8	2	6	0.250	171	250	9th in OUA	Did not qualify
2024	8	1	7	0.125	91	331	10th in OUA	Did not qualify
2025	8	1	7	0.125	170	277	11th in OUA	Did not qualify
2026	8	0	8	0.000	50	324	11th in OUA	Did not qualify

== National postseason results ==
Vanier Cup Era (1965-current)
Year	Game	Opponent	Result
1965	Vanier Cup	Alberta	W 14–7
1974	Atlantic Bowl; Vanier Cup	Saint Mary's; Western	W 45–1; L 15–19
1983	Churchill Bowl	Queen's	L 7–22
1993	Churchill Bowl; Vanier Cup	Concordia; Calgary	W 26–16; W 37–34

Toronto is 2–1 in national semi-final games and 2–1 in the Vanier Cup.

== Rivalry ==
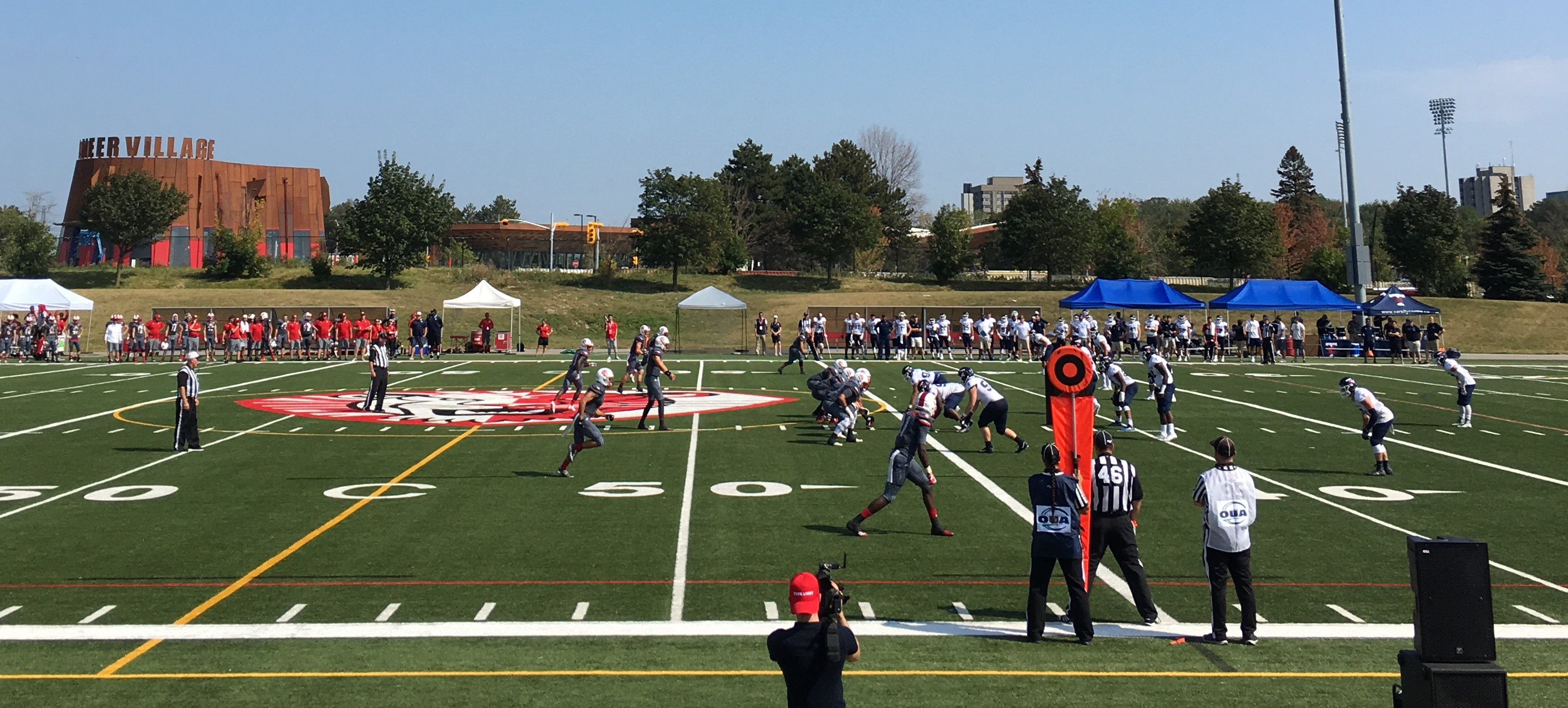
The 2017 Red and Blue Bowl

Since the 1970s, the Blues have maintained a football rivalry with York University. The teams face one another in an annual football match known as the Red and Blue Bowl, where the winner is presented with the Argo Cup, donated in 1992 by the Toronto Argonauts.

== Head coaches ==
Name	Years	Notes
Alfred Williams	1898–1900	
Hugh Hoyles	1901–1902	
A. F. "Biddy" Barr	1903–1906	
Harry Griffith	1907–1910	
Arthur B. Wright	1911–1913	
Hugh Gall	1914	
William C. Foulds	1919	
Laddie Cassels	1920	
John Maynard	1921–1922	
Warren Coryell	1923	
Jack Newton	1924	
A. F. "Biddy" Barr	1925	
Ronnie Macpherson	1926–1927	
Les Blackwell	1928	
Ronnie Macpherson	1929	
Les Blackwell	1930	
Harry Hobbs	1931	
Warren Stevens	1932–1939	
Warren Stevens	1945	
Bobby Coulter	1946–1947	
Bob Masterson	1948–1955	
Dalt White	1956–1965	
Ron Murphy	1966–82	CIAU Coach of the Year (1974)
Doug Mitchell	1983–1987	
Bob Laycoe	1988–2001	
Bob Rainford/Giulio Giordani	2002	
Steve Howlett	2003–07	
Greg DeLaval	2008–10	
Greg Gary	2011–17	
Greg Marshall	2018–2023	
Darrell Adams	2024–2026	

== National award winners ==
- Hec Crighton Trophy: Mike Eben (1967), Mike Raham (1968), Dan Feraday (1981), Eugene Buccigrossi (1992)
- J. P. Metras Trophy: Chris Morris (1990)
- Presidents' Trophy: Lou Tiro (1993)
- Russ Jackson Award: David Hamilton (2008)
- Frank Tindall Trophy: Ron Murphy (1974)

== Varsity Blues in the CFL ==
As of the start of the 2026 CFL season, two former Varsity Blues players were on CFL teams' rosters:

- Albert Awachie, Saskatchewan Roughriders
- Nick Hallett, Winnipeg Blue Bombers
