= Jung-Yul Kim =

South Korean football player (born 1973)

No. 54, 62, 67, 65
- Position: Offensive lineman

Personal information
- Born: February 9, 1973 (age 53); Seoul, South Korea
- Listed height: 6 ft 4 in (1.93 m)
- Listed weight: 250 lb (113 kg)

Career information
- University: Toronto
- CFL draft: 1996: 5th round, 44th overall pick

Career history
- 1996–1999: Calgary Stampeders
- 2000–2001: Toronto Argonauts

Awards and highlights
- Grey Cup champion (1998); Vanier Cup champion (1993)

Jung-Yul Kim (born February 9, 1973) is a South Korean-Canadian former professional football offensive lineman who played five seasons in the Canadian Football League (CFL) with the Calgary Stampeders and Toronto Argonauts. He was selected by the Stampeders in the fifth round of the 1996 CFL draft after playing college football at the University of Toronto. He won the 29th Vanier Cup with the Toronto Varsity Blues. He was also a member of the Stampeders team that won the 86th Grey Cup.

== Early life ==
Jung-Yul Kim was born on February 9, 1973, in Seoul, South Korea. He played college football for the Toronto Varsity Blues of the University of Toronto, with his final year being in 1995. He won the 29th Vanier Cup with the Varsity Blues in 1993. Kim graduated in 1997 with a Bachelor of Science degree in human physiology and human biology.

== Professional career ==
Kim was selected by the Calgary Stampeders in the fifth round, with the 44th overall pick, of the 1996 CFL draft. He dressed in one game for the Stampeders during the 1996 season and also spent time on the practice roster. He also spent the 1997 season on the practice roster. Kim dressed in all 18 games for the Stampeders in 1998 and posted one special teams tackle. On November 22, 1998, the Stampeders won the 86th Grey Cup against the Hamilton Tiger-Cats by a score of 26–24. He dressed in 17 games, starting six, during the 1999 season and recorded two special teams tackles. Kim was released by the Stampeders on June 30, 2000.

Kim signed with the Toronto Argonauts of the CFL on July 14, 2000. He dressed in 11 games for Toronto in 2000. He was diagnosed with type 2 diabetes in 2001. Kim dressed in three games during the 2001 season before being released on August 23, 2001. Due to his diabetes, Kim had to drop his weight from 300 pounds to 235 pounds. Kim later stated "When I lost all that weight, I could tell I just wasn't getting the job done. I was too light and it showed on the field."

== Post-playing career ==
Kim spent time as a coach for the Etobicoke Eagles of the Ontario Varsity Football League (OVFL) and helped them win the OVFL title in 2006. He has also spent time as the offensive line coach for the Toronto Varsity Blues.

Kim has been an actor/stuntman since 1996. He joined the Toronto Police Service as a police officer in 2014.
