= 2011 Saskatchewan Roughriders season =

CFL team season

- General manager: Brendan Taman
- Head coach: Greg Marshall (1–7); Ken Miller (4–6)
- Home stadium: Mosaic Stadium at Taylor Field

Results
- Record: 5–13
- Division place: 4th, West
- Playoffs: did not qualify
- Team MOP: Weston Dressler
- Team MOC: Chris Getzlaf
- Team MOR: Craig Butler

Uniform

The 2011 Saskatchewan Roughriders season was the 54th season for the team in the Canadian Football League (CFL). The Roughriders finished fourth place in the West Division with a 5–13 record and were eliminated from the playoffs after a loss to the BC Lions on October 16, 2011. This marks the first time since 2001 that the Roughriders have missed the playoffs.

== Offseason ==
=== CFL draft ===
The 2011 CFL draft took place on Sunday, May 8, 2011. The Roughriders had five selections in the draft, with the first coming in the 12th spot overall, after trading their seventh overall pick to the Toronto Argonauts for the 12th and 27th selections. Saskatchewan selected defensive back Craig Butler with their first pick and were able to select Matt O'Donnell, an offensive lineman who was one of just two CIS players to be named to the American East–West Shrine Game. The Roughriders also selected placekicker Christopher Milo in case their incumbent kicker, Luca Congi, has not recovered in time from a season-ending injury sustained in 2010.

Round	Pick	Player	Position	School/Club team
2	12	Craig Butler	DB	Western Ontario
2	15	Matt O'Donnell	OL	Queen's
4	27	Alexander Krausnick-Groh	OL	Calgary
4	30	Christopher Milo	K	Laval
6	40	Kyle Exume	RB	Bishop's

== Preseason ==
Week	Date	Opponent	Score	Result	Attendance	Record
A	Fri, June 17	vs. Edmonton Eskimos	23–22	Win	29,130	1–0
B	Wed, June 22	at BC Lions	34–6	Loss	18,742	1–1

# Games played with primary home uniforms.

== Regular season ==
=== Season standings ===
West Division
Team	GP	W	L	T	PF	PA	Pts	
BC Lions	18	11	7	0	511	385	22	Details
Edmonton Eskimos	18	11	7	0	427	401	22	Details
Calgary Stampeders	18	11	7	0	511	476	22	Details
Saskatchewan Roughriders	18	5	13	0	346	482	10	Details

=== Season schedule ===
Week	Date	Opponent	Score	Result	Attendance	Record
1	Sun, July 3	vs. Edmonton Eskimos	42–28	Loss	30,048	0–1
2	Sat, July 9	vs. Montreal Alouettes	39–25	Loss	30,048	0–2
3	Sat, July 16	at Hamilton Tiger-Cats	33–3	Loss	22,245	0–3
4	Sun, July 24	at Montreal Alouettes	27–24	Win	24,434	1–3
5	Sat, July 30	vs. Calgary Stampeders	22–18	Loss	30,048	1–4
6	Fri, Aug 5	at BC Lions	24–11	Loss	25,238	1–5
7	Fri, Aug 12	vs. Calgary Stampeders	45–35	Loss	30,048	1–6
8	Thurs, Aug 18	at Toronto Argonauts	24–18	Loss	20,482	1–7
9	Bye					1–7
ǁ 10 ǁ	Sun, Sept 4	vs. Winnipeg Blue Bombers	27–7	Win	30,048	2–7
ǁ 11 ǁ	Sun, Sept 11	at Winnipeg Blue Bombers	45–23	Win	30,518	3–7
ǁ 12 ǁ	Sat, Sept 17	vs. Toronto Argonauts	30–20	Win	30,048	4–7
ǁ 13 ǁ	Sat, Sept 24	vs. BC Lions	42–5	Loss	30,048	4–8
14	Sat, Oct 1	at Calgary Stampeders	40–3	Loss	33,469	4–9
15	Mon, Oct 10	at Edmonton Eskimos	17–1	Loss	38,054	4–10
16	Sun, Oct 16	vs. BC Lions	29–18	Loss	30,048	4–11
17	Fri, Oct 21	at Calgary Stampeders	25–13	Loss	29,698	4–12
18	Sat, Oct 29	vs. Hamilton Tiger-Cats	19–3	Win	29,073	5–12
19	Fri, Nov 4	at Edmonton Eskimos	23–20	Loss	30,845	5–13

# Games played with primary home uniforms.
# Games played with white uniforms.
ǁ # ǁ Games played with retro alternate uniforms.
ǁ # ǁ Games played with white retro alternate uniforms.

== Roster ==
2011 Saskatchewan Roughriders final roster
Quarterbacks: 17 Cole Bergquist; 8 Ryan Dinwiddie; 4 Darian Durant; Running backs: 26 Graeme Bell; 24 Yvenson Bernard; 22 Stu Foord; 32 Neal Hughes; 9 Brandon West; Receivers: 86 Dallas Baker; 82 Jason Clermont; 7 Weston Dressler; 89 Chris Getzlaf; 80 Efrem Hill; 84 Cary Koch; 18 Scott McHenry	Offensive linemen: 66 Chris Best G; 68 Alexandre Gauthier T; 64 Dan Goodspeed T; 51 Alexander Krausnick-Groh G/C; 60 Gene Makowsky G; 53 Patrick Neufeld T/G; 57 Marc Parenteau C; Defensive linemen: 93 Tearrius George DE; 94 Dario Romero DT; 98 Kenny Rowe DE; 74 Keith Shologan DT; 99 Shomari Williams DE	Linebackers: 50 Jerrell Freeman; 5 Chris Graham; 31 Sean Lucas; 45 Mike McCullough; 46 Kye Stewart; Defensive backs: 29 Tyron Brackenridge; 28 Craig Butler; 30 Jamaal Fudge; 37 Tamon George; 38 Tristan Jackson; 25 Leron Mitchell; 14 James Patrick; 16 Eddie Russ; 48 Justin Wilson	Special teams: 47 Cory Huclack LS; 19 Chris Milo K/P; Reserve roster: 81 Freddie Barnes SB; 20 Wes Cates RB; 95 David Veikune DE; Practice roster: 77 Mathieu Boulay DE; 91 Roberto Davis DE; 92 Zack Evans DT; 62 Nerraw McCormack T	Injured List: 6 Rob Bagg WR (9 Game); 87 Patrick Brown WR (9 Game); 67 Dan Clark T (9 Game); 10 Luca Congi K (9 Game); 1 John Eubanks DB (9 Game); 83 Andy Fantuz SB (9 Game); 43 Chris Francis LB (9 Game); 15 Lance Frazier DB (9 Game); 27 Nick Graham DB (9 Game); 90 Brent Hawkins DE (9 Game); 52 George Hudson C (9 Game); 69 Nick Hutchins C/G (9 Game); 11 Eddie Johnson P/K (9 Game); 39 Chris McKenzie DB (9 Game); 88 Terrence Nunn WR (9 Game); 97 R. J. Roberts DE (9 Game); 3 James Robinson WR (9 Game); 2 Barrin Simpson LB (9 Game); 12 Jordan Sisco WR (9 Game); 35 Jeremiah Weatherspoon DB (9 Game); 85 Ernie Wheelwright WR (9 Game); 41 Remond Willis DE (9 Game); Italics indicate Import player Roster updated 2026-05-09; Depth Chart • Transactions

== Coaching staff ==
2011 Saskatchewan Roughriders staff
Front office: President and ceo – Jim Hopson; Vice president of football operations – Ken Miller; General manager – Brendan Taman; Director of football administration – Brendan Taman; Director of player personnel – Craig Smith; Director of U.S. Scouting – Vacant; Head coaches: Head coach – Ken Miller; Offensive coaches: Assistant head coach/offensive coordinator – Vacant; Receivers/Passing Game Coordinator – Bob Dyce; Running backs – Bill MacDermott; Offensive line – Steve Buratto	Defensive coaches: Defensive coordinator – Richie Hall; Defensive line – Mike Walker; Linebackers – Alex Smith; Defensive assistant – Jerry Friesen; Special teams coaches: Special teams coordinator – Craig Dickenson; Special teams assistant – Jerry Friesen; → Coaching staff
