= Greg Marshall (defensive lineman) =

American gridiron football player and coach (born 1956)

- Marshall with the McMaster Marauders in 2026

McMaster Marauders
- Title: Defensive assistant

Personal information
- Born: September 9, 1956 (age 70); Beverly, Massachusetts, U.S.
- Listed height: 6 ft 4 in (1.93 m)
- Listed weight: 240 lb (109 kg)

Career information
- Position: Defensive lineman
- College: Oregon State
- NFL draft: 1978: 7th round, 186th overall pick

Career history

Playing
- 1978: Baltimore Colts
- 1980–1988: Ottawa Rough Riders

Coaching
- 1990: Ottawa Bootleggers (HC)
- 1991–1993: Ottawa Sooners (HC)
- 1994–1995: Saskatchewan Roughriders (DL coach)
- 1996–1999: Saskatchewan Roughriders (DC)
- 2000–2004: Edmonton Eskimos (DC/DL coach)
- 2005: Ottawa Renegades (A. HC/DC)
- 2006–2008: Winnipeg Blue Bombers (DC/LB coach)
- 2009–2010: Hamilton Tiger-Cats (A. HC/DC/LB coach)
- 2011: Saskatchewan Roughriders (HC)
- 2013: Edmonton Eskimos (DC)
- 2014–2017: Queen's Gaels (DC)
- 2018–2023: Toronto Varsity Blues (HC)
- 2024: Ottawa Redblacks (DL coach)
- 2025: Toronto Argonauts (DL coach)
- 2026–present: McMaster Marauders (Def Assistant)

Awards and highlights
- CFL's Most Outstanding Defensive Player Award (1983); James P. McCaffrey Trophy (1983); 2× CFL All-Star (1981, 1983); 4× CFL East All-Star (1981, 1982, 1983, 1984); Second-team All-Pac-8 (1977)
- Stats at Pro Football Reference

Gregory Edward Marshall (born September 9, 1956) is an American professional football coach and former player. He is a defensive assistant coach for the McMaster Marauders of U Sports football. He played professionally for the Baltimore Colts and the Ottawa Rough Riders for nine years where he was named the league's Most Outstanding Defensive Player in 1983. He has also served as the head coach for the Saskatchewan Roughriders (CFL) and the Toronto Varsity Blues (U Sports).

== Playing career ==
Marshall played college football with the Oregon State Beavers as a defensive tackle. He was drafted in the seventh round of the 1978 NFL draft by the Philadelphia Eagles, but ended up playing in two games for the Baltimore Colts that season. Marshall later played in the CFL for nine seasons as a defensive end for the Ottawa Rough Riders.

== Coaching career ==
After his playing career ended, Marshall ventured into coaching semi-professional football. In 1990, Marshall served as head coach for the Ottawa Bootleggers of the Empire Football League. The next three years, he served as head coach for the Ottawa Sooners of the Canadian Junior Football League.

Marshall began his CFL coaching career with the Saskatchewan Roughriders in 1994, spending the next six seasons with them as their defensive co-ordinator and defensive line coach.

In 2000, Marshall spent the next five seasons with the Edmonton Eskimos, initially as their defensive line coach, then later as their defensive co-ordinator.

In 2005, Marshall served as the defensive co-ordinator and assistant head coach for the Ottawa Renegades. This season would ultimately end up being the Renegades final season before the team suspended their operations.

In 2006, Marshall joined the Winnipeg Blue Bombers as their defensive line coach and defensive co-ordinator, a position he held for the next three seasons.

On January 13, 2009, the Hamilton Tiger-Cats announced the hiring of Marshall as their new defensive co-ordinator and assistant head coach.

On January 5, 2011, it was announced that Marshall had been hired by the Saskatchewan Roughriders to replace Ken Miller as head coach of the club. After a 1–7 start to the 2011 season, the Roughriders fired Marshall on August 19, 2011.

On January 25, 2013, Marshall was named the defensive coordinator of the Edmonton Eskimos.

Marshall served as the defensive coordinator for Queen's Gaels football from 2014 to 2017. His defense found success throughout his tenure, including an OUA conference leading 16 fumble recoveries in 2014 and the conference's second best pass defense in 2016.

On January 3, 2018, Marshall became the head coach for the Toronto Varsity Blues football team of U Sports. After missing the playoffs for two seasons followed by a cancelled 2020 season, he led the Varsity Blues to a playoff berth in 2021 with a 3–3 record. In the following season, he led the team to a 4–4 record and a second consecutive playoff appearance, but the Varsity Blues lost again in the quarter-finals. After regressing to a 2–6 record in 2023, it was announced on November 23, 2023, that Marshall would not return as the team's head coach.

On April 10, 2024, it was announced that Marshall had been hired as the defensive line coach for the Ottawa Redblacks. He spent one season with the team but was not retained for the 2025 season.

It was announced on March 21, 2025, that Marshall had joined the Toronto Argonauts as the team's defensive line coach. He served in that capacity for one year, but was not retained in 2026.

Marshall joined the coaching staff for the McMaster Marauders in 2026 as a defensive assistant coach.

== CFL coaching record ==
Team	Year	Regular season					Postseason		
Team	Year	Won	Lost	Ties	Win %	Finish	Won	Lost	Result
SSK	2011	1	7	0	.125	4th in West Division	-	-	Fired
Total		1	7	0	.125	0 West Division; Championships	-	-	

== Personal life ==
Marshall and his wife, Cindy, have four children and three grandchildren.
