= Hal Laycoe =

Canadian ice hockey player, coach (1922–1998)

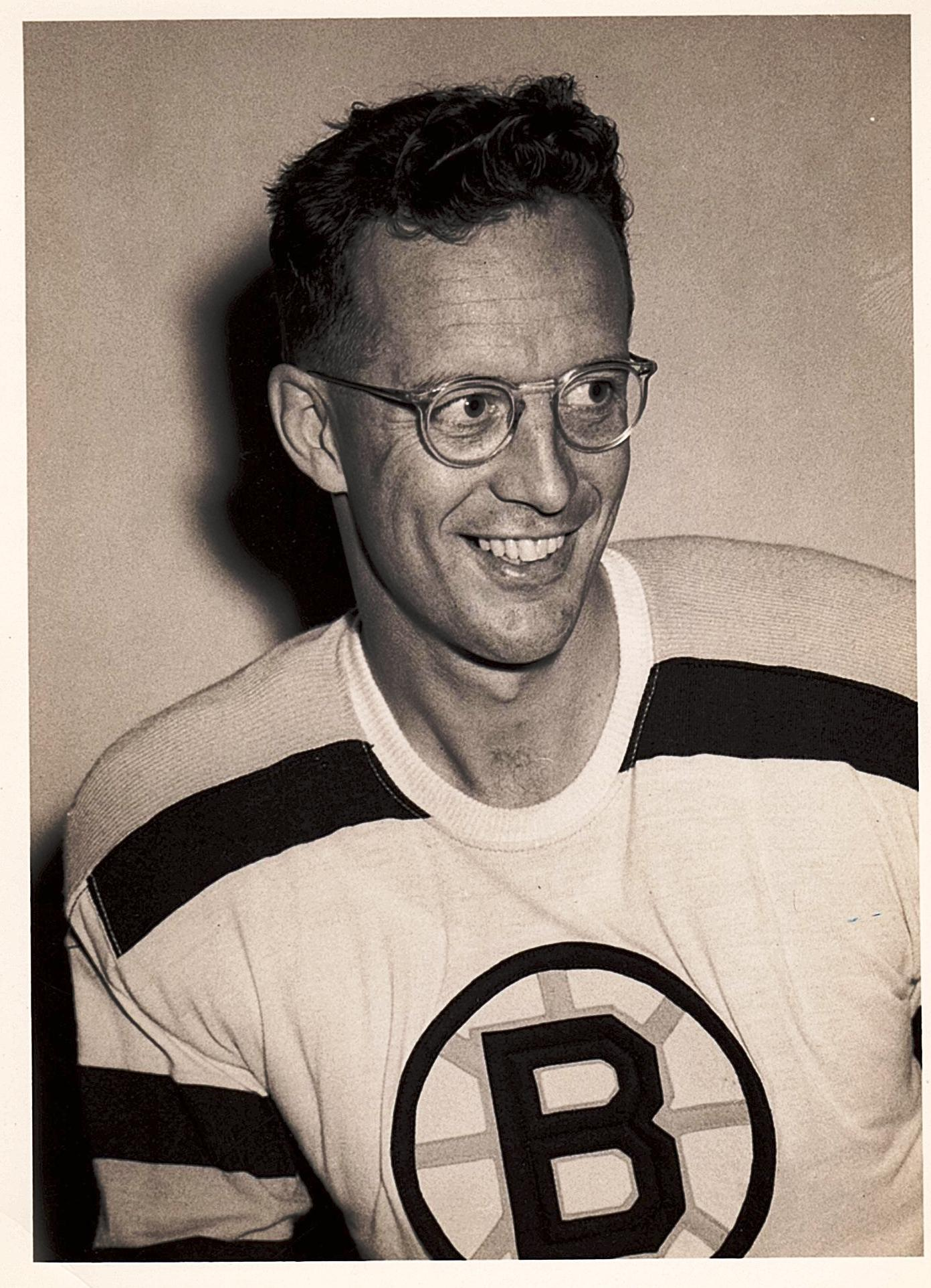
- Born: June 23, 1922 Sutherland, Saskatchewan, Canada
- Died: April 29, 1998 (aged 75) Langley, British Columbia, Canada
- Height: 6 ft 1 in (185 cm)
- Weight: 174 lb (79 kg; 12 st 6 lb)
- Position: Defence
- Shot: Left
- Played for: New York Rangers; Montreal Canadiens; Boston Bruins
- Playing career: 1945–1956

Harold Richardson Laycoe (June 23, 1922 – April 29, 1998) was a Canadian ice hockey defenceman and coach. He played in the National Hockey League (NHL) with the New York Rangers, Montreal Canadiens, and Boston Bruins between 1945 and 1956. After his playing career he became a coach, working as both a coach and general manager in the Western Hockey League between 1956 and 1969. He coached the Los Angeles Kings of the NHL for the first part of the 1969–70 season, and in 1970 became the inaugural coach of the Vancouver Canucks, spending two seasons as coach and a final season as the general manager in 1973–74.

== Playing career ==
Laycoe grew up in rural Sutherland, Saskatchewan. He played junior hockey in Saskatoon, but his dreams of turning pro in the sport were interrupted by World War II. Laycoe served in the Royal Canadian Navy and played on travelling teams while completing his military service. He started his National Hockey League career with the New York Rangers after signing with this team in 1945.

In 1947, Laycoe joined the Montreal Canadiens. Despite wearing eyeglasses during games due to his vision, Laycoe gained a reputation as one of the most physical players in the league. However, he struggled to find playing time on an exceptionally deep team. He was a midseason trade acquisition by the Boston Bruins in 1951, and he received an increased number of minutes on the blue line with his new club. His high stick on and subsequent fight with French-Canadian superstar Maurice Richard was the catalyst for the infamous Richard Riot. Laycoe retired after the 1955-1956 season.

== Coaching career ==
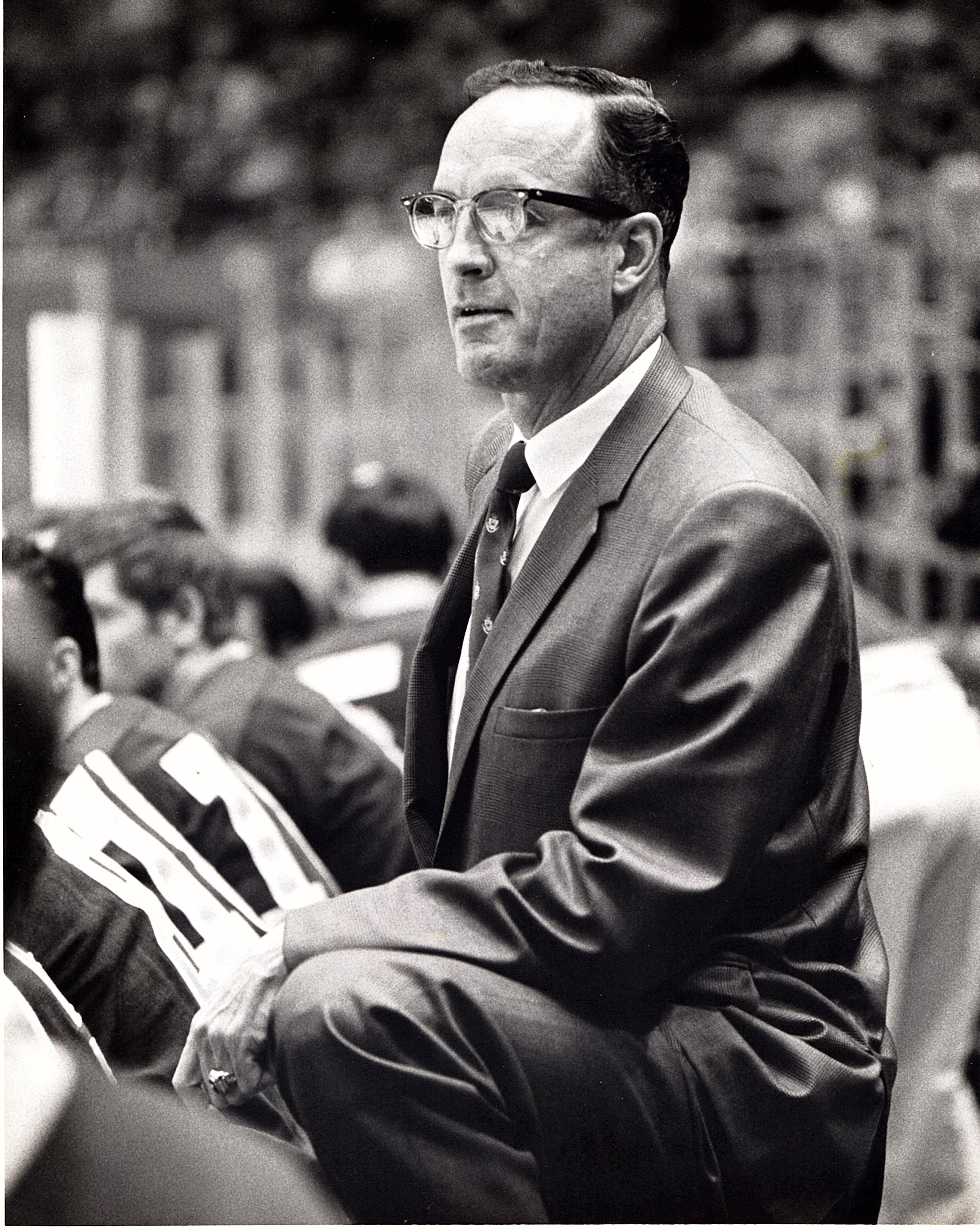
Coaching during late 1960s

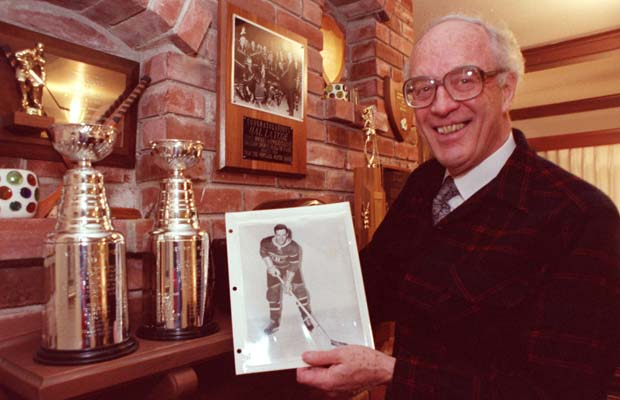
Laycoe, retired in Vancouver

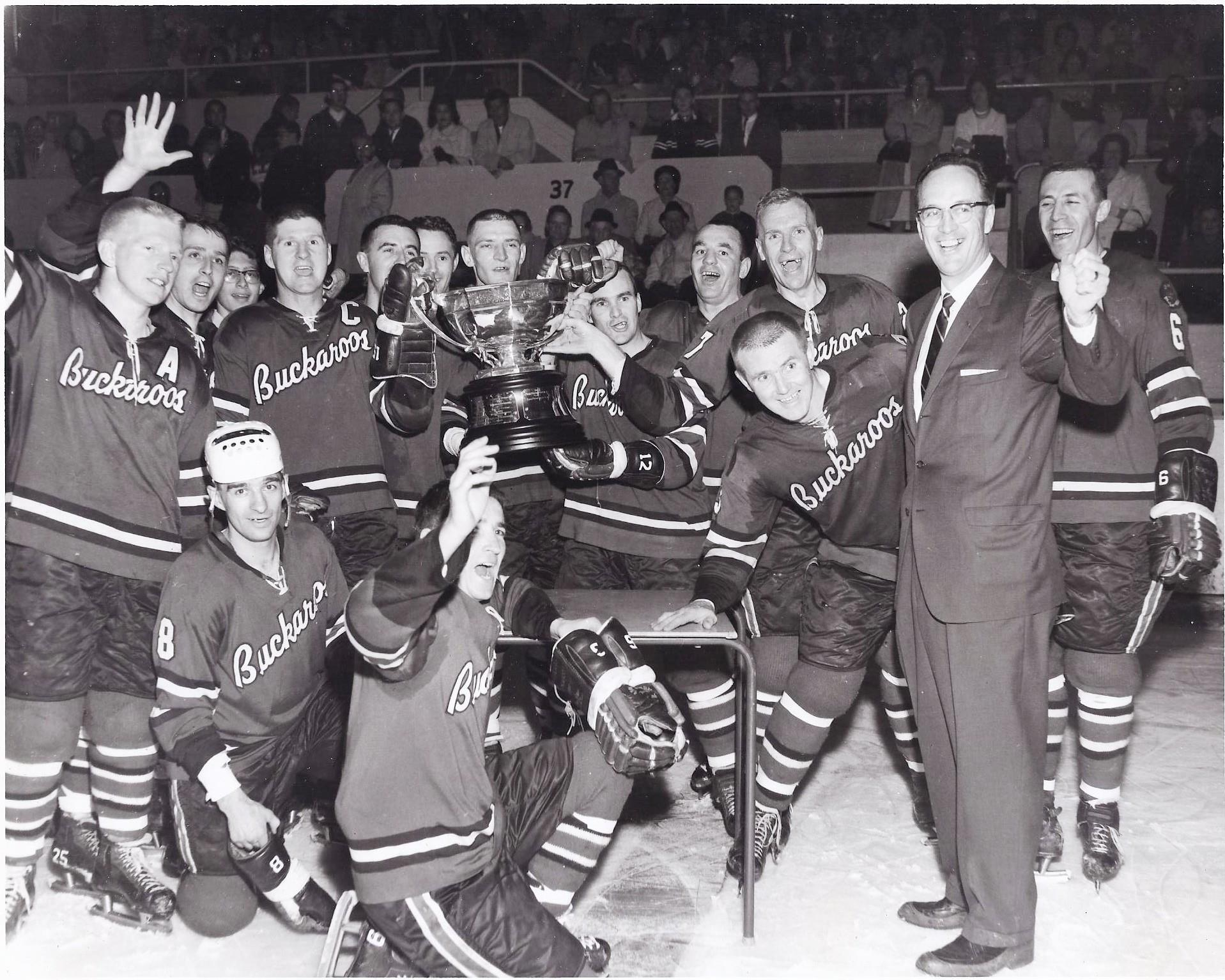
On ice, Portland Buckaroos celebrate Cup win in 1965 at Victoria

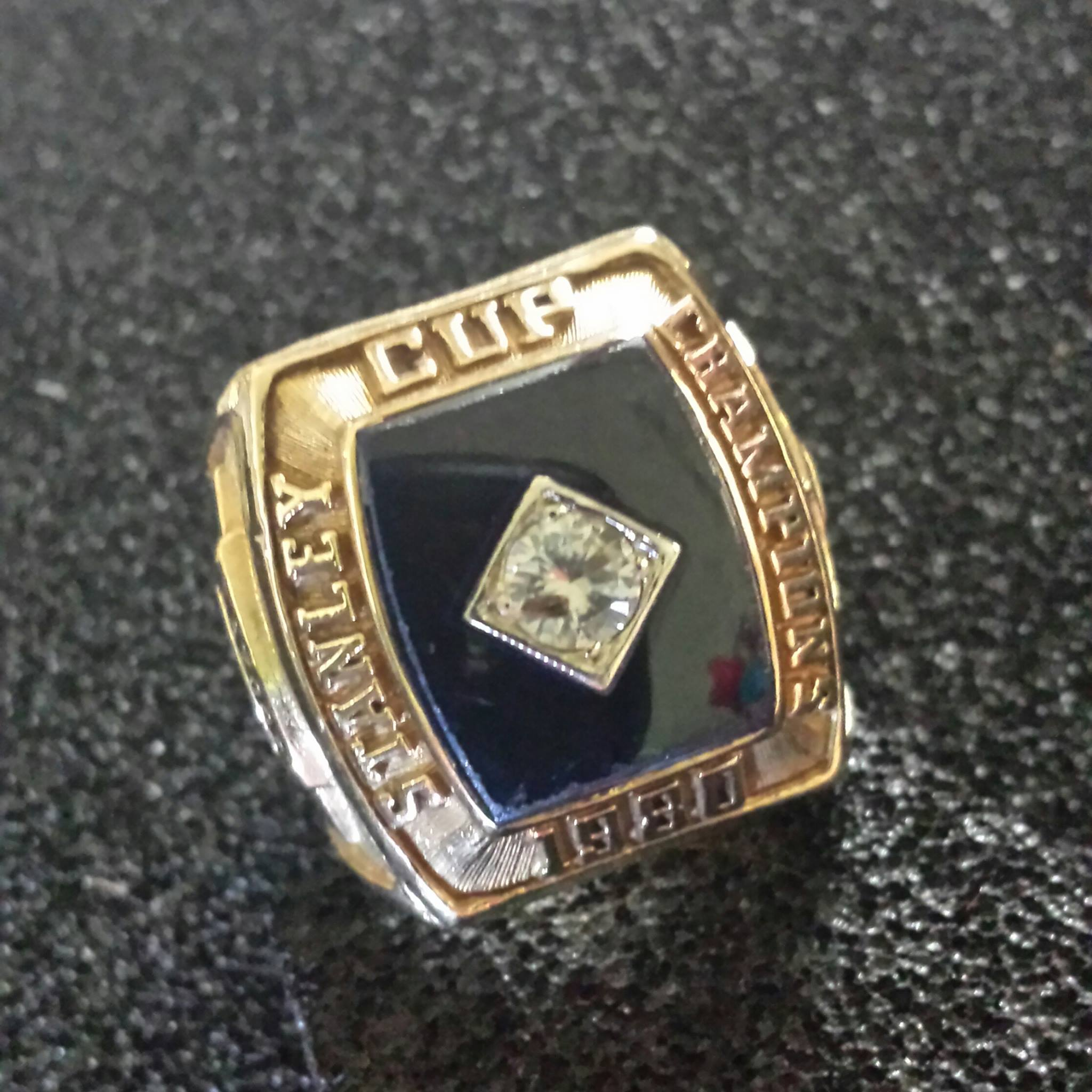
One of four Stanley Cup Rings as European scout for the NY Islanders

Laycoe coached the New Westminster Royals of the Western Hockey League in 1956–57 and remained with the franchise when it moved to Portland, Oregon for the 1960–1961 season and was renamed the Portland Buckaroos. The Buckaroos won the league championship Lester Patrick Cup its first year in existence. Laycoe coached the Buckaroos for nine seasons and won another league championship in 1964–1965. During the 9 Buckaroo years, Laycoe led them to more victories (362) than any other professional team. In 1969, Laycoe moved to the National Hockey League, coaching the Los Angeles Kings for part of one season and then moving on to the expansion Vancouver Canucks for two more seasons. He later coached the Dutch national team in the 1977 B Pool World Championships.He continued to live in Vancouver after leaving the Canucks management team. His final position in hockey was as a scout with the New York Islanders. The Islanders gave team Stanley Cup rings to Laycoe after each of their 1980 to 1984 Stanley Cup wins.

== Personal life and honours ==
Laycoe and his wife, Marjorie had two sons, Bob and Bryan, and a daughter, Rhonda. Bob Laycoe was the head football coach at the University of Toronto from 1988 to 2001.

He was named to the Oregon Sports Hall of Fame in 1984 and the Saskatoon Sports Hall of Fame in 1986.

The Hal Laycoe Cup was presented to the most outstanding defenseman in the Western Hockey League from 1964 to 1973.

== Career statistics ==
=== Regular season and playoffs ===
			Regular season					Playoffs
Season	Team	League	GP	G	A	Pts	PIM	GP	G	A	Pts	PIM
1938–39	Saskatoon Chiefs	NSJHL	3	0	0	0	0	—	—	—	—	—
1939–40	Saskatoon Dodgers	NSJHL	4	1	5	6	6	2	0	4	4	4
1940–41	Saskatoon Quakers	NSJHL	11	12	11	23	13	2	3	4	7	0
1940–41	Saskatoon Quakers	SSHL	1	0	0	0	0	—	—	—	—	—
1940–41	Saskatoon Quakers	M-Cup	—	—	—	—	—	10	4	8	12	22
1941–42	Saskatoon Quakers	SSHL	28	14	13	27	27	9	3	4	7	4
1941–42	Saskatoon Quakers	Al-Cup	—	—	—	—	—	4	0	1	1	0
1942–43	Ottawa Postal Corps	OCHL	1	0	0	0	0	—	—	—	—	—
1943–44	Toronto Navy	OHA	14	6	6	12	4	—	—	—	—	—
1943–44	Toronto People's Credit	TIHL	9	3	1	4	2	9	2	6	8	11
1944–45	Winnipeg Navy	WNDHL	15	10	15	25	8	5	5	8	13	0
1945–46	New York Rangers	NHL	17	0	2	2	6	—	—	—	—	—
1945–46	New York Rovers	EAHL	35	7	22	29	25	—	—	—	—	—
1946–47	New York Rangers	NHL	58	1	12	13	25	—	—	—	—	—
1947–48	Montreal Canadiens	NHL	14	1	2	3	4	—	—	—	—	—
1947–48	Buffalo Bisons	AHL	45	8	25	33	36	8	2	0	2	15
1948–49	Montreal Canadiens	NHL	51	3	5	8	31	7	0	1	1	13
1948–49	Buffalo Bisons	AHL	10	4	1	5	10	—	—	—	—	—
1949–50	Montreal Canadiens	NHL	30	0	2	2	21	2	0	0	0	0
1950–51	Montreal Canadiens	NHL	34	0	2	2	25	—	—	—	—	—
1950–51	Boston Bruins	NHL	10	1	1	2	4	6	0	1	1	5
1951–52	Boston Bruins	NHL	70	5	7	12	61	7	1	1	2	11
1952–53	Boston Bruins	NHL	54	2	10	12	36	11	0	2	2	10
1953–54	Boston Bruins	NHL	57	3	16	19	29	2	0	0	0	0
1954–55	Boston Bruins	NHL	70	4	13	17	32	5	1	0	1	0
1955–56	Boston Bruins	NHL	65	5	5	10	16	—	—	—	—	—
1956–57	New Westminster Royals	WHL	—	—	—	—	—	—	—	—	—	—
NHL totals			530	25	77	102	290	40	2	5	7	39

=== Coaching record ===
			Regular season					Playoffs
Season	Team	League	GC	W	L	T	Finish	GC	W	L	Result
1956–57	New Westminster Royals	WHL	70	34	34	5	2nd, WHL	13	6	7	Lost in Final
1957–58	New Westminster Royals	WHL	70	39	28	3	3rd, WHL	4	1	3	Lost in First Round
1958–59	New Westminster Royals	WHL	70	23	45	2	5th, WHL	—	—	—	—
1959–60	Victoria Cougars	WHL	70	37	29	4	3rd, WHL	6	4	5	Lost in Final
1960–61	Portland Buckaroos	WHL	70	38	23	9	2nd, WHL	14	10	4	Won Lester Patrick Cup
1961–62	Portland Buckaroos	WHL	70	42	23	5	1st, WHL	7	3	4	Lost in Second Round
1962–63	Portland Buckaroos	WHL	70	43	21	6	1st, WHL	7	3	4	Lost in Second Round
1963–64	Portland Buckaroos	WHL	70	33	30	7	2nd, WHL	5	1	4	Lost in First Round
1964–65	Portland Buckaroos	WHL	70	42	23	5	1st, WHL	10	8	2	Won Lester Patrick Trophy
1965–66	Portland Buckaroos	WHL	72	43	24	5	1st, WHL	8	4	4	Lost in Final
1966–67	Portland Buckaroos	WHL	72	41	24	7	1st, WHL	4	0	4	Lost in First Round
1967–68	Portland Buckaroos	WHL	72	40	26	6	1st, WHL	12	5	7	Lost in Final
1968–69	Portland Buckaroos	WHL	74	40	18	16	1st, WHL	11	4	7	Lost in Final
1969–70	Los Angeles Kings	NHL	24	5	18	1	6th, West	—	—	—	—
1969–70	Vancouver Canucks	WHL	9	5	3	1	1st, WHL	11	8	3	Won Lester Patrick Trophy
1970–71	Vancouver Canucks	NHL	78	24	46	8	6th, East	—	—	—	—
1971–72	Vancouver Canucks	NHL	78	20	50	8	7th, East	—	—	—	—
NHL totals			180	49	114	17	—	—	—	—	—

Preceded by Bud Poile	General Manager of the Vancouver Canucks; 1973-74	Succeeded by Phil Maloney
Preceded by Red Kelly	Head coach of Los Angeles Kings; 1969	Succeeded by Johnny Wilson
Preceded by Position created	Head coach of the Vancouver Canucks; 1970-72	Succeeded by Vic Stasiuk
