= Brendan Taman =

Professional Canadian football executive

Ottawa Redblacks
- Title: Director of Pro Personnel

Personal information
- Born: December 12, 1966 (age 59); Saskatoon, Saskatchewan, Canada

Career history
- 1987–1988: Saskatchewan Roughriders (Player Personnel Assistant)
- 1989–1992: Ottawa Rough Riders (Manager of Football Operations)
- 1993–1996: Saskatchewan Roughriders (Asst. Director of Player Personnel)
- 1997–1999: BC Lions (Director of Player Personnel)
- 1999–2004: Winnipeg Blue Bombers (Asst. General Manager)
- 2004–2008: Winnipeg Blue Bombers (General Manager)
- 2009–2010: Saskatchewan Roughriders (Director of Football Administration)
- 2010–2015: Saskatchewan Roughriders (General Manager)
- 2020–2021: Montreal Alouettes (Senior Player Personnel Executive)
- 2022–present: Ottawa Redblacks (Director of Pro Personnel)

Brendan Taman (born December 12, 1966) is the director of pro personnel for the Ottawa Redblacks of the Canadian Football League (CFL). He has also served as the general manager for the Winnipeg Blue Bombers and Saskatchewan Roughriders. He is a Grey Cup champion having won with the Roughriders as the team's general manager for the 101st Grey Cup in 2013. He attended Aden Bowman Collegiate.

== Football operations career ==
In 1987, Saskatchewan Roughriders director of player personnel Dan Rambo hired Taman as a player personnel assistant. When Rambo and Roughriders offensive coordinator Steve Goldman became general manager and head coach of the Ottawa Rough Riders in 1989, Taman joined them as the team's manager of football operations. He remained in Ottawa until Rambo was fired following the 1992 season. After spending four seasons as Saskatchewan's assistant director of player personnel, Taman became the BC Lions' Director of Player Personnel. In this position he was in charge of scouting, assisted head coach and general manager Adam Rita in handling contracts, and handled much of the day-to-day football operations while Rita focused on coaching. While in BC, Taman signed 1997 and 1998 Jackie Parker Trophy winners B. J. Gallis and Steve Muhammad.

From 1999-2009, Taman worked with the Winnipeg Blue Bombers, first as assistant general manager (1999–2004) and then as general manager (2004–2009). Under his direction, the Blue Bombers had a 39-50-1 record and made an appearance in 95th Grey Cup. Taman was moved from the GM position to the position of Vice President of Player Personnel in late 2008. He stepped down as VP of Player Personnel on January 13, 2009, saying he needed a break from football.

Taman was hired by the Roughriders on June 30, 2009 as director of football administration. Along with head coach Ken Miller and director of player personnel Joe Womack, Taman handled the day-to-day operations of the team while general manager Eric Tillman was on paid administrative leave following sexual assault allegations. Tillman resigned on January 8, 2010 and on January 22, Taman was named as his replacement as general manager. On August 31, 2015, after the Roughriders started 0-9, Taman and head coach Corey Chamblin were relieved of their duties.

On January 24, 2020, it was announced that Taman had joined the Montreal Alouettes as the team's Senior Player Personnel Executive. He spent two years with the Alouettes.

It was announced on January 3, 2022, that Taman had been hired as the Director of Pro Personnel for the Ottawa Redblacks.

== CFL GM record ==
Team	Year	Regular season					Postseason		
Team	Year	Won	Lost	Ties	Win %	Finish	Won	Lost	Result
WPG	2004	7	11	0	.389	4th in East Division	-	-	Missed playoffs
WPG	2005	5	13	0	.278	4th in East Division	-	-	Missed playoffs
WPG	2006	9	9	0	.500	3rd in East Division	0	1	Lost in East Semi-Final
WPG	2007	10	7	1	.588	2nd in East Division	2	1	Lost in Grey Cup Final
WPG	2008	8	10	0	.444	2nd in East Division	0	1	Lost in East Semi-Final
SSK	2010	10	8	0	.556	2nd in West Division	2	1	Lost in Grey Cup Final
SSK	2011	5	13	0	.278	4th in West Division	-	-	Missed playoffs
SSK	2012	8	10	0	.444	3rd in West Division	0	1	Lost in West Semi-Final
SSK	2013	11	7	0	.611	2nd in West Division	3	0	Won Grey Cup
SSK	2014	10	8	0	.556	3rd in West Division	0	1	Lost in West Semi-Final
SSK	2015	0	9	0	.000	5th in West Division	0	0	Fired
Total		83	105	1	.439	0 Division; Championships	7	5	1 Grey Cups
