= Dalt White =

Canadian football coach

Alexander Dalton "Dalt" White was a Canadian football coach who was head coach of the Toronto Varsity Blues football team from 1956 to 1965. His 1965 team won the 1st Vanier Cup, Canada's first university football championship game.

== Early life ==
White was born in Toronto and grew up in Snelgrove, Ontario. He attended the University of Toronto, where he was a standout lacrosse player. He also spent three seasons as a member of the school's basketball team. He graduated from U of T's University College in 1938 and from its Ontario College of Education in 1939.

== Coaching ==
White began his coaching career at Port Colborne High School. He then spent five seasons at Toronto's Western Tech, where he won the first Ontario Golden Ball basketball title. In 1947, he became an assistant director of physical education in the Ontario Department of Education. He returned to coaching in 1951 as an assistant football coach at the University of Toronto. In 1956, he was promoted to head coach after Bob Masterson left to become general manager of the Calgary Stampeders. In 10 seasons under White, Toronto went 39–37–2 and won the Yates Cup twice (1958 and 1965) in addition to capturing the inaugural Vanier Cup in 1965. He remained with the University as an associate professor.

== Administration ==
White served as the University of Toronto's director of men's athletics from 1970 to 1977 and men's intercollegiate coordinator from 1977 to 1979. He was inducted into the University of Toronto's Athletic Hall of Fame in 1994.

== Personal life ==
White was married to his wife, Marnie, for 54 years. They met when he was a coach and she was a graduating student at Western Tech. They had six children.

He died of heart failure at North York General Hospital on March 7, 2002.
