= 1st Vanier Cup =

1965 Canadian university football championship

Alberta Golden Bears	Toronto Varsity Blues
(4–2)	(3–3)
7	14
Head coach: Gino Fracas	Head coach: Dalt White
	1	2	3	4	Total
Alberta Golden Bears	0	7	0	0	7
Toronto Varsity Blues	1	0	7	6	14
- Date: November 20, 1965
- Stadium: Varsity Stadium
- Location: Toronto
- Ted Morris Memorial Trophy: Jerry Sternberg, Toronto
- Attendance: 3,488

The 1st Vanier Cup was played on November 20, 1965, at Varsity Stadium in Toronto, Ontario, and decided Canada's university football champions by way of a national invitation to participate in the game. The Alberta Golden Bears and the Toronto Varsity Blues were invited by a national panel to compete in a single elimination game to decide the Canadian university football champion for the 1965 season. The Varsity Blues won the game for their first ever championship by defeating the Golden Bears by a score of 14-7.
