= Ron Murphy (Canadian football) =

Canadian football player and coach (1932–2020)

Ronald Murphy
Profile
- Positions: Guard, Linebacker, Tackle

Personal information
- Born: June 13, 1932; Hamilton, Ontario, Canada
- Died: October 20, 2020 (aged 88)
- Listed height: 6 ft 2 in (1.88 m)
- Listed weight: 220 lb (100 kg)

Career history
- 1952–1953: Hamilton Tiger Cats
- 1958–1961: Montreal Alouettes

Awards and highlights
- Grey Cup champion (1953)

Ronald Cornelius Murphy (June 13, 1932 – October 20, 2020), was a Canadian professional football player and coach. Murphy played for the Hamilton Tiger Cats and Montreal Alouettes, winning the Grey Cup with Hamilton in 1953. He later attended McGill University, where he also played on the varsity team.

Murphy later coached football at McGill as an assistant following his CFL career. He then returned to his alma mater to coach, and was named head coach in 1965. Serving until 1982, Murphy is the school's all-time leader in victories, with 93. His team won league championships in 1967 and 1974. He was named the CIAU Coach of the Year in 1974. He resigned his head coach position in 1983 and worked in the university's Department of Athletics and Recreation. During this time, Murphy also earned a master's degree in education in 1981. He returned to the coaching staff as an assistant from 1986 to 1993, winning another championship in 1993. He received the John S. McManus Award from the CIAU in 1993 and the Thomas L. Loudon Award from the University of Toronto in 1994. In 2009, he was inducted into the University of Toronto Sports Hall of Fame as a builder. Murphy died in 2020 at the age of 88.
