= Greg Gary (Canadian football) =

American gridiron football player (born 1957)

Profile
- Position: Head coach

Personal information
- Born: November 30, 1957 (age 68); Albany, Indiana, U.S.
- Listed height: 6 ft 1 in (1.85 m)
- Listed weight: 226 lb (103 kg)

Career information
- College: California State, Fullerton

Career history

Playing
- 1983–1986: Hamilton Tiger-Cats

Coaching
- 2008: Toronto Varsity Blues (LBC)
- 2011–2017: Toronto Varsity Blues (HC)

Awards and highlights
- Grey Cup champion (1986)

Greg Gary (born November 10, 1958) is a former professional gridiron football linebacker and the former head coach for the University of Toronto's football team, the Varsity Blues. Gary became Toronto's head coach in 2011 after serving as the team's linebackers coach in 2008. As a professional player, he played for one season with the Los Angeles Rams of the National Football League (NFL) and for four seasons with the Hamilton Tiger-Cats of the Canadian Football League (CFL), where he won a Grey Cup championship. Collegiately, he played college football for the Cal State Fullerton Titans.
