= 29th Vanier Cup =

1993 Canadian university football championship

Calgary Dinos	Toronto Varsity Blues
(5–2–1)	(6–1)
34	37
Head coach: Peter Connellan	Head coach: Bob Laycoe
	1	2	3	4	Total
Calgary Dinos	7	0	14	13	34
Toronto Varsity Blues	6	10	7	14	37
- Date: November 20, 1993
- Stadium: SkyDome
- Location: Toronto
- Ted Morris Memorial Trophy: Glenn McCausland, Toronto
- Bruce Coulter Award: Rob Schrauth, Calgary
- Attendance: 20,211

The 29th Vanier Cup was played on November 20, 1993, at the SkyDome in Toronto, Ontario, and decided the CIAU football champion for the 1993 season. The Toronto Varsity Blues won their second championship by defeating the Calgary Dinos by a score of 37-34.
