= Alexander Krausnick-Groh =

Canadian football player (born 1989)

No. 52
- Positions: Center, Long snapper

Personal information
- Born: March 9, 1989 (age 37); Calgary, Alberta, Canada
- Listed height: 6 ft 3 in (1.91 m)
- Listed weight: 290 lb (132 kg)

Career information
- University: Calgary
- CFL draft: 2011: 4th round, 27th overall pick
- Expansion draft: 2013: 2nd round, 14th overall pick

Career history
- 2011–2012: Saskatchewan Roughriders
- 2013: Edmonton Eskimos
- 2014: Ottawa Redblacks
- 2015: Edmonton Eskimos

Awards and highlights
- Grey Cup champion (2015)
- Stats at CFL.ca (archive)

Alexander Krausnick-Groh (born March 9, 1989) is a Canadian former professional football offensive lineman and long snapper. He was drafted 27th overall by the Saskatchewan Roughriders in the 2011 CFL draft. He signed with the team on June 1, 2011. He played CIS football for the Calgary Dinos.
