= Ken Miller (gridiron football) =

American sports coach (1941–2024)

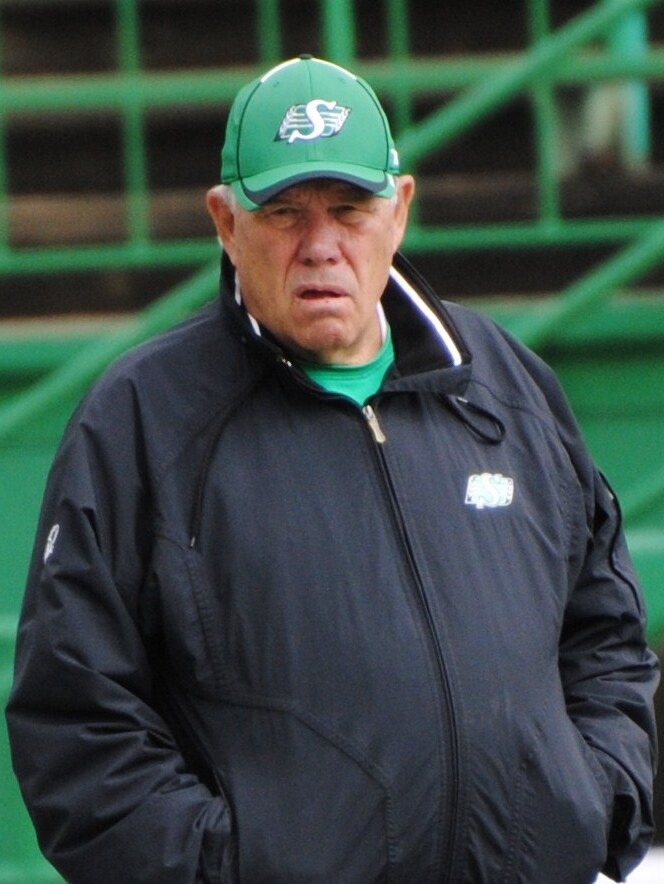
- Miller in 2010

Profile
- Position: Head coach

Personal information
- Born: October 15, 1941; The Dalles, Oregon, U.S.
- Died: August 21, 2024 (aged 82); Asheville, North Carolina, U.S.

Career history

Coaching
- 1966: Dickinson State (Asst. coach)
- 1970–1976: Yucaipa HS (HC)
- 1977–1983: Redlands (OL coach)
- 1984–1987: Redlands (HC)
- 1988–1993: Redlands (OC)
- 1994: Redlands (DC)
- 1995–2000: Redlands (OC)
- 2002: Toronto Argonauts (QB coach)
- 2003–2005: Toronto Argonauts (OL coach)
- 2006: Toronto Argonauts (DL coach)
- 2007: Saskatchewan Roughriders (OC)
- 2008–2011: Saskatchewan Roughriders (HC)
- 2017–2024: Montreal Alouettes (Offensive Consultant)

Operations
- 2010–2011: Saskatchewan Roughriders (VP of Football Operations)

Ken Miller (October 15, 1941 – August 21, 2024) was an American football coach. He last served as an offensive consultant for the Montreal Alouettes of the Canadian Football League (CFL). He previously served in the league as head coach and vice president of football operations for the Saskatchewan Roughriders. He served as the Roughriders head coach between 2008 and 2010, leading the team to appearances in the Grey Cup in 2009 and 2010. Miller returned as head coach of the Roughriders on August 19, 2011, after the firing of Greg Marshall after a 1–7 start to the 2011 CFL season. Miller was the club's offensive coordinator under head coach Kent Austin when they captured the 95th Grey Cup in 2007. He had previously served on the coaching staffs of the Toronto Argonauts, University of Redlands, Dickinson State, and Yucaipa High School.

== Coaching career ==
Miller started his coaching career in 1966 as a student assistant coach with Dickinson State. He spent the next three season coaching high school football in Oregon before becoming head coach at Yucaipa High School in 1970. He joined the University of Redlands as a part-time offensive line coach in 1977 and in 1984 he was promoted to the head coaching position. In 1988 Miller was demoted to offensive coordinator. In 1994, Miller switched to defensive coordinator. He moved back to the offensive side of the ball in 1995 and held the offensive coordinator position until his retirement after the 2000 football season. Miller was also the head baseball coach at Redlands from 1986 to 2000. As Redlands' baseball coach, Miller accumulated a 250–235–2 record and led the Bulldogs to a Southern California Intercollegiate Athletic Conference title in 1991.

In 2002, Miller started his Canadian Football League coaching career when he became the Toronto Argonauts quarterbacks coach. From 2003–2005, Miller was the Argo's offensive line coach. In 2004, Miller's offensive line helped the Argonauts win the 92nd Grey Cup and Damon Allen win the league's Most Outstanding Player award. In 2006 Miller was moved to the defensive side of the ball where he handled the defensive line.

In 2007, Miller was hired by former Argonauts assistant Kent Austin to become the offensive coordinator of the Saskatchewan Roughriders. Miller's offensive, led by MOP Kerry Joseph scored the second most points in the CFL and led the Riders to victory in the 95th Grey Cup. After the season, Miller was promoted to head coach when Austin left after one season to become the offensive co-ordinator at the University of Mississippi. On December 2, 2010, Ken Miller resigned as head coach of the Saskatchewan Roughriders. He was originally to remain vice-president of football operations. On August 19, 2011, Miller was reinstated as head coach after the firing of head coach Greg Marshall following the Saskatchewan Roughriders 1–7 start to the 2011 season. Following the second last week of the 2011 CFL season Ken Miller announced that he will be stepping down as the team's head coach and vice-president of football operations.

== Personal life and death ==
Miller and his wife Maureen moved to Asheville, North Carolina, following the end of his coaching career. Miller died of cancer in Asheville, on August 21, 2024, at the age of 82.

== Head coaching record ==
=== College ===
Year	Team	Overall	Conference	Standing	Bowl/playoffs
Redlands Bulldogs (Southern California Intercollegiate Athletic Conference) (1984–1987)
1984	Redlands	5–5	1–3–1 (Note: From 1984 to 1990, the Southern California Intercollegiate Athletic Conference (SCIAC) football schedule included multiple head-to-head meetings each season. In 1984 and 1985, each conference member played two other conference members twice. From 1986 to 1990, each conference member played one other conference member twice. A head-to-head sweep of the two games in one season counted as one win for the winner and one loss for the loser in the conference standings. A split of the two games counted as a tie for each team.)	T–4th	
1985	Redlands	4–6	3–2	3rd	
1986	Redlands	0–10	0–5	6th	
1987	Redlands	1–8	0–4–1	6th	
Redlands:		10–29	4–14–2		
Total:		10–29			

=== CFL ===
Team	Year	Regular season					Postseason		
Team	Year	Won	Lost	Ties	Win %	Finish	Won	Lost	Result
SSK	2008	12	6	0	.667	2nd in West Division	0	1	Lost in semi-finals
SSK	2009	10	7	1	.583	1st in West Division	1	1	Lost in Grey Cup
SSK	2010	10	8	0	.555	2nd in West Division	2	1	Lost in Grey Cup
SSK	2011	4	6	0	.400	4th in West Division	0	0	Missed playoffs
Total		36	27	1	.570	1 West Division Championship	3	3	
