= 2026 U Sports football season =

- League: U Sports
- Sport: Canadian football
- Duration: August 29 – October 31, 2026

Playoffs
- Hardy Cup champions: UBC Thunderbirds
- Yates Cup champions: Western Mustangs
- Jacques Dussault Cup champions: Montreal Carabins
- Loney Bowl champions: St. Mary's Huskies
- Mitchell Bowl champions: Western Mustangs
- Uteck Bowl champions: Montreal Carabins

Vanier Cup
- Date: November 28, 2026
- Venue: Telus Université Laval Stadium (Quebec City, Quebec)

Seasons
- 2025 2027

The 2026 U Sports football season began on August 29, with eight Ontario University Athletics (OUA) teams opening their schedules and two more OUA teams playing the following day. The RSEQ, Atlantic University Sport, and Canada West began play the following weekend, highlighted by the Bishop's Gaiters returning to the RSEQ conference after a nine-year stint in the AUS.

The conference championships will be played on the weekend of November 14, and the season will conclude on November 28 with the 61st Vanier Cup championship. The Vanier Cup game will be held at Telus Université Laval Stadium in Quebec City, Quebec. Twenty-seven university teams in Canada are scheduled to play U Sports football, the highest level of amateur Canadian football.

The defending champions are the Montreal Carabins.

== Schedules ==
On March 24, 2026, the RSEQ released their schedule, which notably featured the return of the Bishop's Gaiters after they had left following the 2016 season to join the AUS, in which they won one conference championship. With the RSEQ now holding an even number of teams, the schedule was reduced from ten weeks to nine, with all teams receiving a bye week over Thanksgiving weekend. The Jacques Dussault Cup game was played on November 14. The OUA next announced their schedule on March 27, which featured 11 teams playing over nine weeks from August 29 to October 24.

On April 8, 2026, the AUS announced their schedule with four teams playing eight regular season games over nine weeks with all teams taking a bye week over Thanksgiving weekend. With the AUS reverting to four teams, three of them qualified for the playoffs with the first-place team receiving a bye. On May 13, Canada West released their schedule with six teams playing eight games over nine weeks from September 4 to October 31.

== Regular season ==
=== Standings ===
2026 AUS standings
Team	W		L	PF		PA	Pts	Ply
#6 Saint Mary's	8	–	0	229	–	98	16	†
St. FX	5	–	3	239	–	152	10	X
Acadia	2	–	6	137	–	200	4	X
Mount Allison	1	–	7	111	–	266	2	
† – Conference Champion; Rankings: U Sports Top 10

2026 OUA standings
Team	W		L	PF		PA	Pts	Ply
#3 Queen's	7	–	1	303	–	184	14	†
#7 Western	6	–	2	370	–	202	12	X
#10 McMaster	6	–	2	182	–	131	12	X
#5 Windsor	6	–	2	312	–	177	12	X
Guelph	4	–	4	287	–	187	8	X
Ottawa	4	–	4	224	–	209	8	X
#9 Laurier	4	–	4	294	–	214	8	X
Waterloo	3	–	5	199	–	280	6	
York	3	–	5	138	–	272	6	
Carleton	1	–	7	170	–	349	2	
Toronto	0	–	8	50	–	324	0	
† – Conference Champion; Rankings: U Sports Top 10

2026 RSEQ standings
Team	W		L	PF		PA	Pts	Ply
#1 Laval	8	–	0	322	–	99	16	†
#2 Montréal	6	–	2	253	–	196	12	X
McGill	5	–	3	243	–	175	10	X
Concordia	3	–	5	134	–	196	6	X
Sherbrooke	1	–	7	143	–	282	2	
Bishop's	1	–	7	105	–	252	2	
† – Conference Champion; Rankings: U Sports Top 10

2026 Canada West standings
Team	W		L	PF		PA	Pts	Ply
#8 British Columbia	6	–	2	244	–	161	12	†
#4 Saskatchewan	6	–	2	287	–	229	12	X
Regina	4	–	4	212	–	146	8	X
Manitoba	4	–	4	178	–	191	8	X
Calgary	3	–	5	204	–	230	6	
Alberta	1	–	7	130	–	298	2	
† – Conference Champion; Rankings: U Sports Top 10

== Post-season awards ==
=== Award-winners ===
	Quebec	Ontario	Atlantic	Canada West	National
Hec Crighton Trophy	Victor Charland (Laval)	Kareame Cotton Jr. (Windsor)	Malcolm Bussey (Saint Mary's)	Anton Amundrud (Saskatchewan)	
Presidents' Trophy	Justin Cloutier (Laval)	Jaxxon Brashear (Ottawa)	Kosta Zannis (Acadia)	Nic Pereira (Manitoba)	
J. P. Metras Trophy	Samuel Cahill (Laval)	Christian Chukwuali (McMaster)	Jackob Branton (Saint Mary's)	Caleb Cunningham (British Columbia)	
Peter Gorman Trophy	Elliott Drapeau (McGill)	Nathan Summers (Western)	Denzel-Praise Oguejiofor (Acadia)	Marvyn Larozar (British Columbia)	
Russ Jackson Award	Charles Barakett (McGill)	Nick Orr (Waterloo)	Sam Taylor (St. Francis Xavier)	Saboor Zeeshan (Calgary)	
Frank Tindall Trophy	Glen Constantin (Laval)	Steve Snyder (Queen's)	Steve Sumarah (Saint Mary's)	Blake Nill (British Columbia)	
Gino Fracas Award	Émilie Pfeiffer Badoux (Montreal)	Rob Underhill (McMaster)	Pete Miller (Mount Allison)	Ray Salverda (Alberta)	

== Post-season ==
The Vanier Cup is played between the champions of the Mitchell Bowl and the Uteck Bowl, the national semi-final games. In 2026, according to the rotating schedule, the Canada West Hardy Trophy championship team visited the winners of the Jacques Dussault Cup Quebec championship for the Uteck Bowl. The Atlantic conference's Loney Bowl championship team visited the Ontario conference Yates Cup championship team for the Mitchell Bowl. These games were played on November 21, while the Vanier Cup is scheduled to be played on November 28.

=== Conference Championships ===
==== Atlantic University Sport ====
November 7 Semi-final			November 14; 34th Loney Bowl
			1	St. Mary's	28
2	St. Francis Xavier	48	2	St. Francis Xavier	15
3	Acadia	17

==== Canada West ====
November 7 Semi-finals
1	British Columbia	30
4	Manitoba	23
2	Saskatchewan	27
3	Regina	39

November 14; 89th Hardy Trophy
1	British Columbia	41
3	Regina	39

==== Ontario University Athletics ====
October 31; Quarter-finals
3	McMaster	17
6	Ottawa	33
2	Western	58
7	Laurier	41
4	Windsor	28
5	Guelph	24

November 7 Semi-finals
1	Queen's	45
6	Ottawa	27
2	Western	43
4	Windsor	33

November 14; 118th Yates Cup
1	Queen's	27
2	Western	36

==== Réseau du Sport Étudiant du Québec ====
November 7 Semi-finals
1	Laval	42
4	Concordia	4
2	Montréal	28
3	McGill	21

November 14; 2nd Jacques Dussault Cup
1	Laval	10
2	Montréal	14

=== National championship ===
November 21; Semi-finals
24th Mitchell Bowl – London, ON
St. Mary's	14
Western	64
23rd Uteck Bowl – Montreal, QC
British Columbia	13
Montréal	30

November 28; Final
61st Vanier Cup – Quebec City, QC
Western
Montréal
