= Adam Rita =

Canadian football player and coach

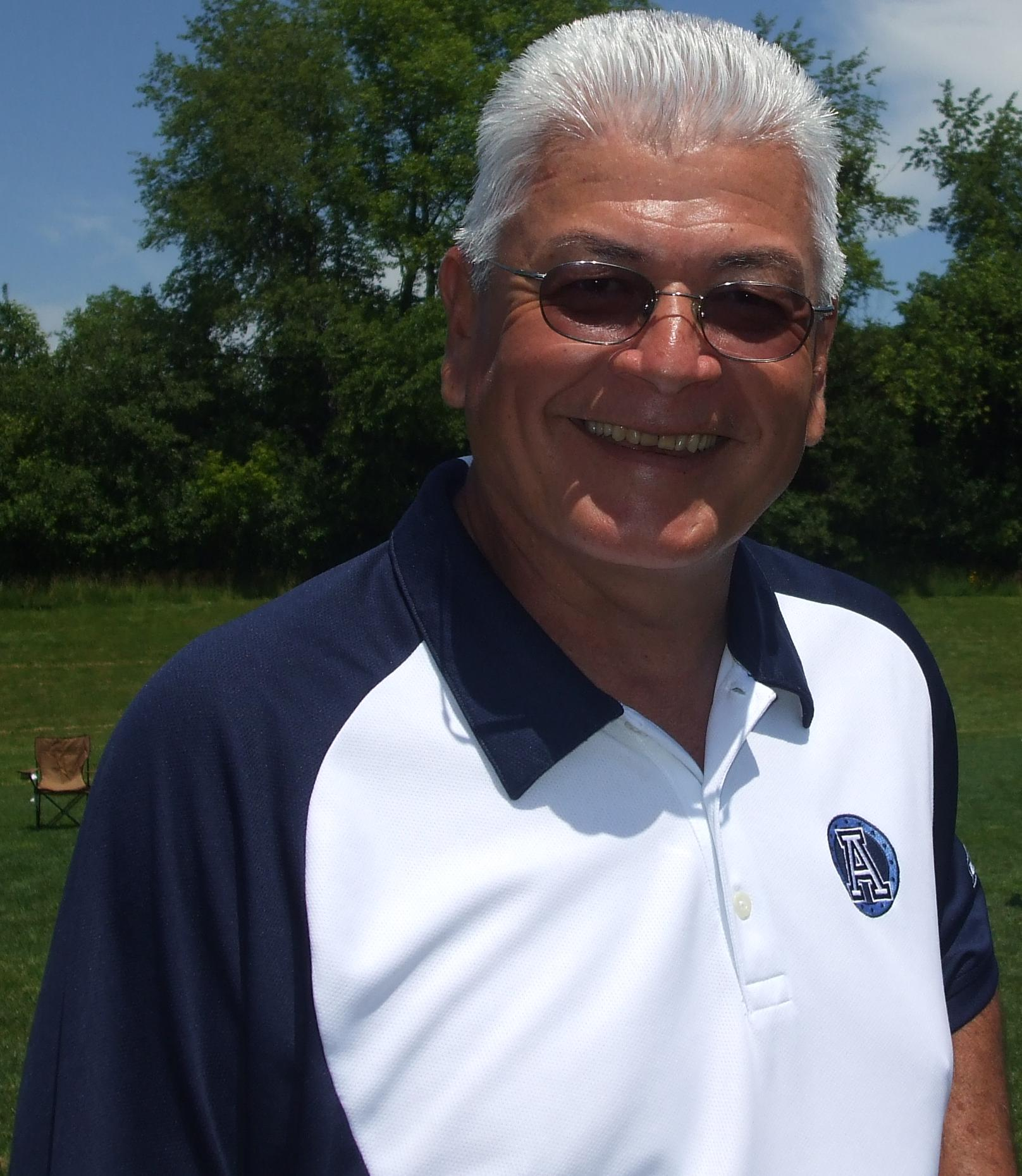
- Rita at the Argos' practice facility in 2009

Barcelona Dragons (ELF)
- Title: Head coach

Personal information
- Born: September 21, 1947 (age 79); Kauaʻi, Hawaii, U.S.

Career history

Coaching
- 1969–1976: Boise State Broncos (AC)
- 1977–1978: UNLV Rebels (AC)
- 1979–1982: Hawaii Rainbow Warriors (AC)
- 1983–1988: BC Lions (OC)
- 1989: UBC Thunderbirds (HC)
- 1990: Toronto Argonauts (OC)
- 1991–1992: Toronto Argonauts (HC)
- 1993: Edmonton Eskimos (OC)
- 1994: Ottawa Rough Riders (HC)
- 1995: Memphis Mad Dogs (OC)
- 1996: Toronto Argonauts (OC)
- 1997–1998: BC Lions (HC)
- 2002: BC Lions (IHC)
- 2003: Toronto Argonauts (OC)
- 2012–2015: Trinity College School (AC/OC)
- 2012: Prague Panthers (HC)
- 2013–2014: Calanda Broncos (HC)
- 2016–2019: Clarkson Secondary School (OC)
- 2017–2019: Bergamo Lions (HC/OC)
- 2019: Clarkson Secondary School (AC)
- 2020: Berlin Adler (HC)
- 2021: Barcelona Dragons (ELF) (HC)
- 2022-present: Bergamo Lions (HC)

Operations
- 1997–2002: BC Lions (GM)
- 2004–2010: Toronto Argonauts (GM)

Awards and highlights
- As coach: 4× Grey Cup champion – (1985, 1991, 1993, 1996); Annis Stukus Trophy (1991); Swiss Bowl champion (2013); As executive: 2× Grey Cup champion – (2000, 2004)

Adam Rita (born September 21, 1947) is a gridiron football coach & general manager, most notably in the Canadian Football League (CFL). He has served as the head coach of the Toronto Argonauts, Ottawa Rough Riders, and BC Lions and as general manager of the Lions and Argonauts. Since leaving the CFL in 2012, Rita has been coaching American football in Europe. Coaching the Bergamo Lions in the Italian Football League (IFL), Calanda Broncos in Switzerland, Prague Panthers in Czech, Berlin Adler Germany, Barcelona Dragons in Spain, in the newly formed European League of Football (ELF) in 2021 and returned again to the Bergamo Lions in 2022.

== College playing career ==
From 1965 to 1968, Rita attended Boise State University playing center for the Boise State Broncos.

== NCAA coaching career ==
From 1969 to 1976, Rita continued his tenure with the Boise State Broncos, serving as an assistant coach & recruiting director. After leaving Boise State, Rita's U.S. college coaching stints continued with the UNLV Rebels & Hawaii Rainbow Warriors.

== Coaching & GM career in Canadian football ==
In 1983, Rita began his first professional coaching tenure as the offensive co-ordinator for the B.C. Lions under head coach Don Matthews.

In 1989, Rita left the CFL to join the coaching staff of the UBC Thunderbirds of CIAU football.

In 1990, Rita rejoined Matthews in Toronto as offensive coordinator for the Toronto Argonauts. In 1991, after Matthews' departure, Rita became a first time CFL head coach for the Argonauts with whom he won his first and only Grey Cup championship as a head coach in that same year. In September 1992, after a 3–8 start to the season, Rita was fired as Argonauts head coach.

In 1993, Rita joined the Edmonton Eskimos as their offensive coordinator. The team went on to win the 81st Grey Cup that year.

In 1994, Rita became the head coach of the Ottawa Rough Riders. The team went on to finish their season with a 4-14.

In 1995, Rita resigned as the Rough Riders' head coach to become the offensive coordinator for one of the new U.S. expansion teams in the CFL, the Memphis Mad Dogs.

In 1996, Rita reunited with Matthews, rejoining the Argonauts as their offensive coordinator in 1996. The team would go on to win the 84th Grey Cup that year.

In 1997, Rita joined the B.C. Lions as both their new head coach and general manager. In 1998, Rita relinquished his head coaching responsibilities halfway through the season, focusing exclusively on his general manager duties. In 2002, after six games into the season, Rita took over as their interim head coach.

In 2003, Rita returned to the Toronto Argonauts as their offensive coordinator serving under head coach Pinball Clemons who he used to coach. In 2004, Rita was promoted to General Manager and Vice President of Football Operations of the Argonauts. Toronto won the 92nd Grey Cup in his first year on the job, but managed only a 48–60 record after that. Rita's contract was not renewed following the 2010 season and he was replaced by head coach Jim Barker.

During his CFL tenure, Rita won 6 Grey Cups in 8 appearances in his capacities as head coach, offensive coordinator, and general manager.

In 2012, Rita retired from the CFL and turned to high school football coaching, becoming an assistant coach & offensive coordinator with the Trinity College School football team in Port Hope, Ontario.

In 2016, Rita moved from Trinity College School to the "Football North" program at Clarkson Secondary School in Mississauga as their assistant coach and offensive coordinator. In 2019, Rita was elevated to assistant head coach.

== Coaching career in Europe ==
Rita discovered Europlayers which serves as a job website for European sports. This led to his first European coaching job in 2012 as the head coach for the Prague Panthers in the Czech Republic, where the team finished as Czech league runner up losing in the Czech Bowl championship game. The Panthers also competed in the Austrian Football League top level.

In 2013–14, Rita served as the head coach of the Calanda Broncos in Switzerland Nationalliga A (American football) winning the Swiss Bowl championship in 2013 and finishing runner up losing in the Swiss bowl in 2014. The team also competed in the European Football League.

In 2017–19, Rita served as the head coach and offensive coordinator of the Bergamo Lions of the Italian Football League IFL.

In 2020, Rita was named as the new head coach for the Berlin Adler of the German Football League 2. Unfortunately, the 2020 season was not played due to the COVID-19 pandemic.

In 2021, Rita was named as the first ever head coach for the Spanish-based team Gladiators Football, later rebranded as Barcelona Dragons, of the newly formed European League of Football.

In 2022, Rita returned to the Bergamo Lions in Italy as head coach. The 2022 Lions are competed in the second tier of the Italian League. The Lions qualified to return to the highest level league in Italy (IFL) for the 2023 season.

== Personal life ==
Rita grew up on Kaua'i, Hawai'i and as a young boy, he was a member of a canoe club and appeared paddling a canoe in the wedding scene of the Elvis Presley movie Blue Hawaii.

Rita is married to his wife Judit who is from Hungary. He also has two sons, Kevin and Harrison, and two grandchildren, Seth and Jennifer. As of 2020, Rita and his wife reside in Mississauga, Ontario.

== CFL GM record ==
Team	Year	Regular season					Postseason		
Team	Year	Won	Lost	Ties	Win %	Finish	Won	Lost	Result
BC	1997	8	10	0	.444	4th in West Division	0	1	Lost in East Semi-Final
BC	1998	9	9	0	.500	3rd in West Division	0	1	Lost in West Semi-Final
BC	1999	13	5	0	.750	1st in West Division	0	1	Lost in West Final
BC	2000	8	10	0	.444	3rd in West Division	3	0	Won Grey Cup
BC	2001	8	10	0	.444	3rd in West Division	0	1	Lost in West Semi-Final
BC	2002	10	8	0	.750	3rd in West Division	0	1	Lost in West Semi-Final
TOR	2003	9	9	0	.500	2nd in West Division	1	1	Lost in East Final
TOR	2004	10	7	1	.588	2nd in East Division	3	0	Won Grey Cup
TOR	2005	11	7	0	.611	1st in East Division	0	1	Lost in East Final
TOR	2006	10	8	0	.556	2nd in East Division	1	1	Lost in East Final
TOR	2007	11	7	0	.611	1st in East Division	0	1	Lost in East Final
TOR	2008	4	14	0	.222	3rd in East Division	-	-	Failed to Qualify
TOR	2009	3	15	0	.167	4th in East Division	-	-	Failed to Qualify
TOR	2010	9	9	0	.500	3rd in East Division	1	1	Lost in East Final
Total		122	128	1	.488	3 Division; Championships	9	10	2 Grey Cups

== CFL coaching record ==
Team	Year	Regular season					Postseason		
Team	Year	Won	Lost	Ties	Win %	Finish	Won	Lost	Result
TOR	1991	13	5	0	.722	1st in East Division	2	0	Won Grey Cup
TOR	1992	3	8	0	.273	4th in East Division	–	–	Fired Midseason
OTT	1994	4	14	0	.222	4th in East Division	0	1	Lost in East Semi-Final
BC	1997	8	10	0	.444	4th in West Division	0	1	Lost in Division Semifinals
BC	1998	2	6	0	.250	4th in West Division	–	–	Resigned Midseason
BC	2002	9	3	0	.750	3rd in West Division	0	1	Lost in Division Semifinals
Total		40	46	0	.465	1 Division; Championships	2	3	1 Grey Cup

Awards
Preceded by Mike Riley	Grey Cup winning Head Coach; 79th Grey Cup, 1991	Succeeded by Wally Buono
