= Wilmington College (Ohio) =

Private college in Wilmington, Ohio, US

- Motto: Non saltu sed multis gradibus (Latin)
- Motto in English: Not by a leap, but by many steps
- Type: Private college
- Established: 1870; 156 years ago
- Accreditation: HLC
- Religious affiliation: Religious Society of Friends (Quakers)
- Academic affiliations: CIC
- Endowment: $75M
- President: Corey Cockerill
- Undergraduates: 1,042 (2024)
- Postgraduates: 50
- Location: Wilmington, Ohio, U.S. 39°26′38″N 83°49′04″W
- Campus: 1,248 acres; Rural
- Colors
- Nickname: Quakers
- Sporting affiliations: NCAA Division III – OAC
- Mascot: Quakerman
- Website: wilmington.edu/

Wilmington College is a private liberal arts college in Wilmington, Ohio, United States. It was established by the Religious Society of Friends (Quakers) in 1870 and is accredited by the Higher Learning Commission. The college is still Quaker-affiliated and has seven core Quaker values. In fall 2018, the college set an enrollment record, bringing in 450 new students for the academic year, totaling 1,103 students on Wilmington's main campus and 139 students at Wilmington's two Cincinnati branches at Blue Ash and Cincinnati State.

== History ==
In 1863 three brothers, Hugh, James, and Thomas Garvin founded Franklin College in Albany, Ohio. After two years in Albany, the college was relocated to Wilmington, where the cornerstone of College Hall was laid on 4 July 1866. The institution was closed in 1868 following the Civil War. In 1870 the half-completed Franklin College building went up for auction. The building and 33 surrounding acres were purchased by the Religious Society of Friends (Quakers). Lewis Estes was named the first president. Following a few years of economic struggle, Estes resigned. Benjamin Trueblood, a recent Earlham College graduate, was named the new president. In 1875, Wilmington College graduated its first class of four students. South Hall (razed 1956) was the college's first dorm in 1876, and in 1904 the college purchased a former boarding house and named it Twin Ash Hall (demolished 1984).

In 1917, Wilmington College acquired the Lebanon National Normal School in Lebanon, Ohio.

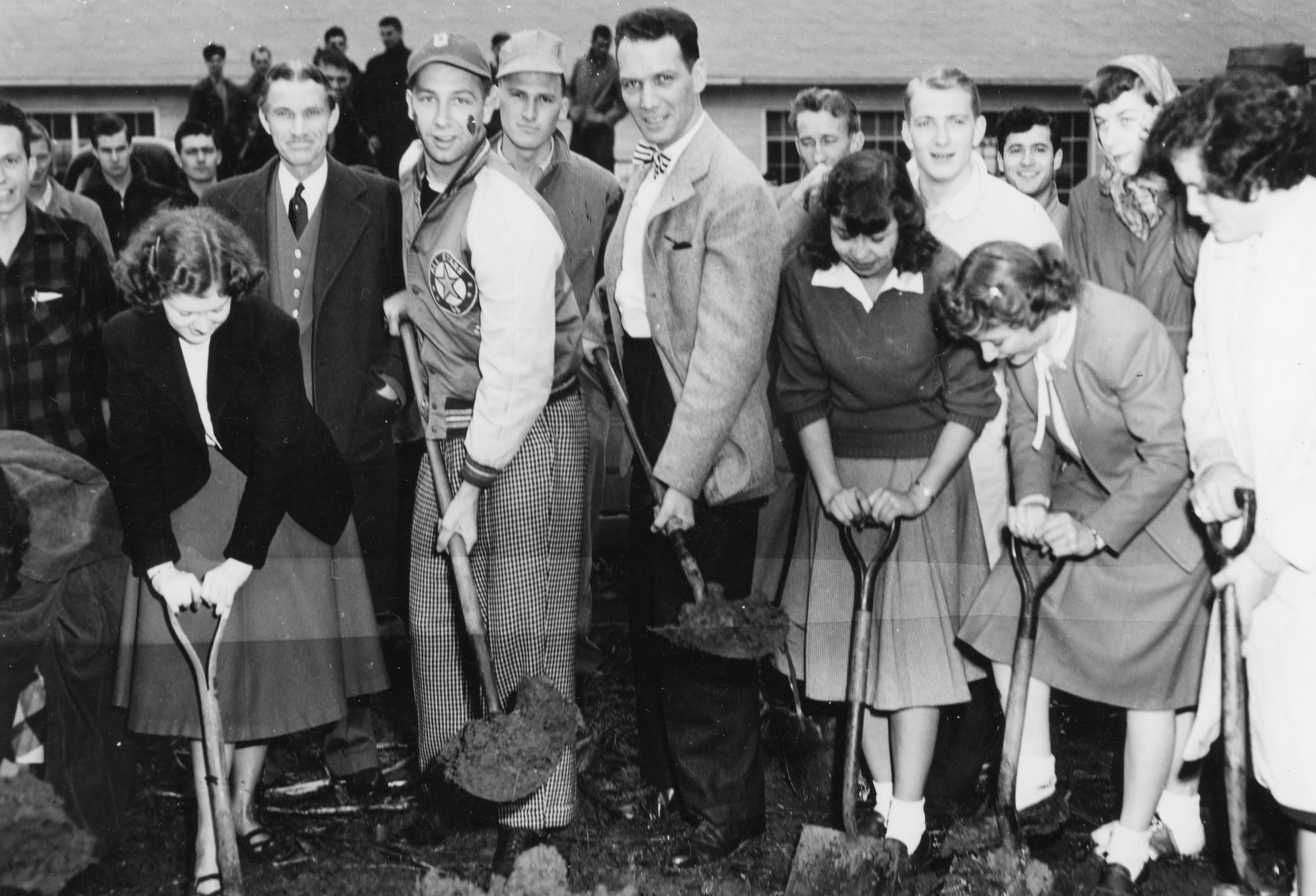
The ground breaking for Marble Hall, which was entirely built by students and brought national attention to Wilmington College. 13 April 1948

In 1944, under President S. Arthur Watson, the college was accredited by the Higher Learning Commission and joined the North Central Association of Colleges. Following World War II, Wilmington College saw a huge boost in growth. Under President Samuel Marble, Marble Hall (1950) was constructed by students. This was due to the large boost in the middle class and the creation of the G.I. Bill. Also built by students were The Pyle Student Center (1957) and Friends Hall (1955). The current gymnasium, Herman Court, was constructed in 1966.

In 2020, Trevor Bates was named as the college's 19th and first African-American president. Bates was released from his contract in March 2023 by the college's board of trustees and Corey Cockerill was named interim president.

The college has 25 majors, 27 minors, and 32 concentrations. As well as three graduate programs. There are 18 intercollegiate sports in the NCAA Div-III. The campus features over 50 student-led organizations.

=== Presidents ===
College Hall pictured in the early 1960s

- Lewis A. Estes: 1871-1874
- Benjamin Franklin Trueblood: 1874-1879
- David Dennis: 1879-1881
- James Unthank: 1881-1903
- Albert Brown: 1903-1912
- Samuel Hodgin: 1912-1915
- J Edwin Jay: 1915-1927
- Henry Williams: 1927-1928
- Beverly Skinner: 1928-1931
- Walter Collins: 1932-1940
- Sheppard Arthur Watson: 1940-1947
- Samuel Marble: 1947-1959
- W Brooke Morgan: 1959-1960*
- James Read: 1960-1969
- W Brooke Morgan: 1969-1970*
- Robert Hinshaw: 1971-1975
- Neil Thorburn: 1982-1995
- Daniel A. DiBiasio: 1995-2011
- James Reynolds: 2012-2020
- Erika Goodwin: 2020*
- Trevor Bates: 2021–2023
- Corey Cockerill: 2023-present

Indicates interim/acting president*

== Academics ==
Wilmington College offers 24 undergraduate majors with 27 minors and 32 concentrations. Wilmington College currently offers two masters programs.

Wilmington College has a partnership with Drayer Physical Therapy Institute. Athletic Training, Exercise Science, and Physical Therapy students get hands-on learning opportunities through Drayer's office that is housed in the college's Center for Sport Sciences.

Wilmington College's Watson Library is a member of the Ohio Private Academic Libraries (OPAL) consortium and the OhioLINK consortium that provides an integrated catalog, e-resources, and more than 100 research databases.

== Campuses ==
- Wilmington, Ohio (Main Campus)
- Wilmington College operates in Dayton, Warren, and Lebanon Correctional Institutes.

== Main campus ==
=== Academic buildings ===
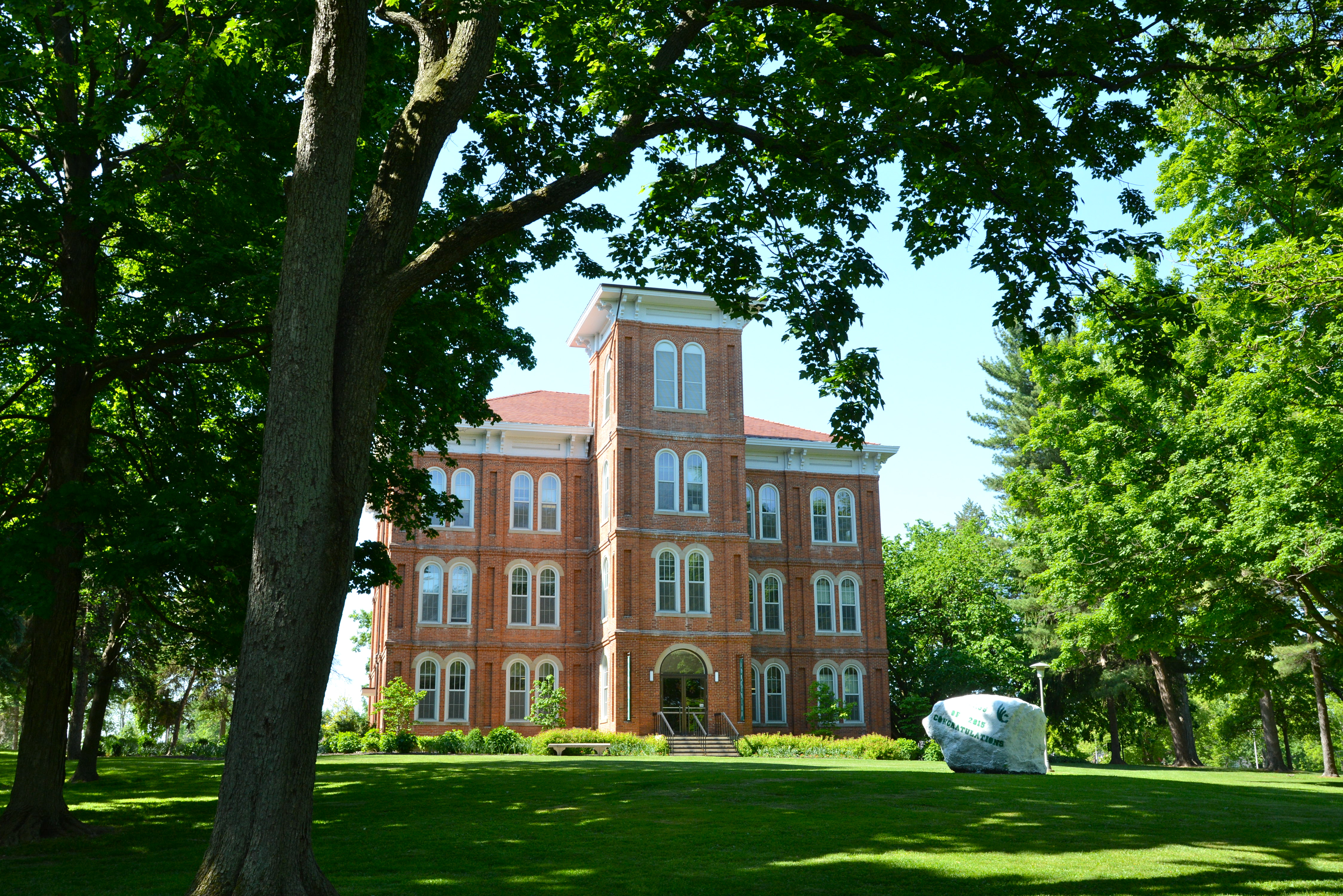
College Hall

- College Hall (1869): Historic building present at Wilmington College's founding in 1870. Houses classrooms, faculty offices, offices of Admission, Financial Aid, the President's Office, and Academic Affairs. Added to National Register of Historic Places in 1972.
- Bailey Hall (1908): Began as a science building for the college, and later renovated into student housing. Renovated to become home of the college's science programs once again temporarily during ongoing renovations to Kettering Hall. Bailey Hall is currently home to political science, criminal justice, psychology/sociology, and business offices.
- S. Arthur Watson Library (1941): The college library, named for former College president S. Arthur Watson. The building is home to the college archives, OhioLink, OPAL, and study space for students. In 2023 the Watson Library began undergoing renovations.
- Thomas R. Kelly Religious Center (1962): Kelly Religious Center houses faculty offices, classrooms, and the offices of the Wilmington Yearly Meeting.
- Robinson Communication Center (1992): Houses the Academic Resource Center, computer labs, photography labs and studios, the Communication Arts Department, and student publication offices.
- Oscar F. Boyd Cultural Arts Center (2005): Features David and June Harcum Art Gallery, the WC Theatre Department, 440-seat Hugh Heiland Theatre, Meriam R. Hare Quaker Heritage Center, T. Canby Jones Meetinghouse, and two-story academic wing with classrooms and faculty offices. Wilmington College Campus Ministry is also housed here, as well as the Campus Friends Meeting.
- Center for Sport Sciences (2015): Houses the college's Athletic Training program, indoor and outdoor practice facilities for all athletic teams, and offices for Drayer Physical Therapy Institute, Beacon Orthopedics and Sport Medicine, and chiropractic offices.
- Center for the Sciences & Agriculture (2016): Includes the renovated 34,000 square-foot former Kettering Science Hall and a 13,500 square-foot addition. The facility hosts 10 classrooms, 10 laboratories, three research labs, two 100-seat lecture halls and 30 offices.
- Fife Hall (1906): Originally constructed as the Clinton County Infirmary in 1906. In 1997, Wilmington College purchased the land and existing structure. The structure houses dormitories and academic classrooms. One side houses the art program and the other agriculture labs. The Wilmington College Campus Farm is also housed here, containing several barns for equipment and animals.
- Pyle Student Center (1957): Three story student union in the center of campus. The Pyle Center is home to the campus book store, mailroom, financial one stop, housing and residence life, student affairs, diversity and inclusion, student government, and student activities. The second floor of Pyle is known as T.O.P. and is the student dining hall. The basement, known as the Underground, is home to study space, a general store, and large game room. In December 2023, the Pyle Center began undergoing renovations. The T.O.P. was fully renovated in August of 2022.
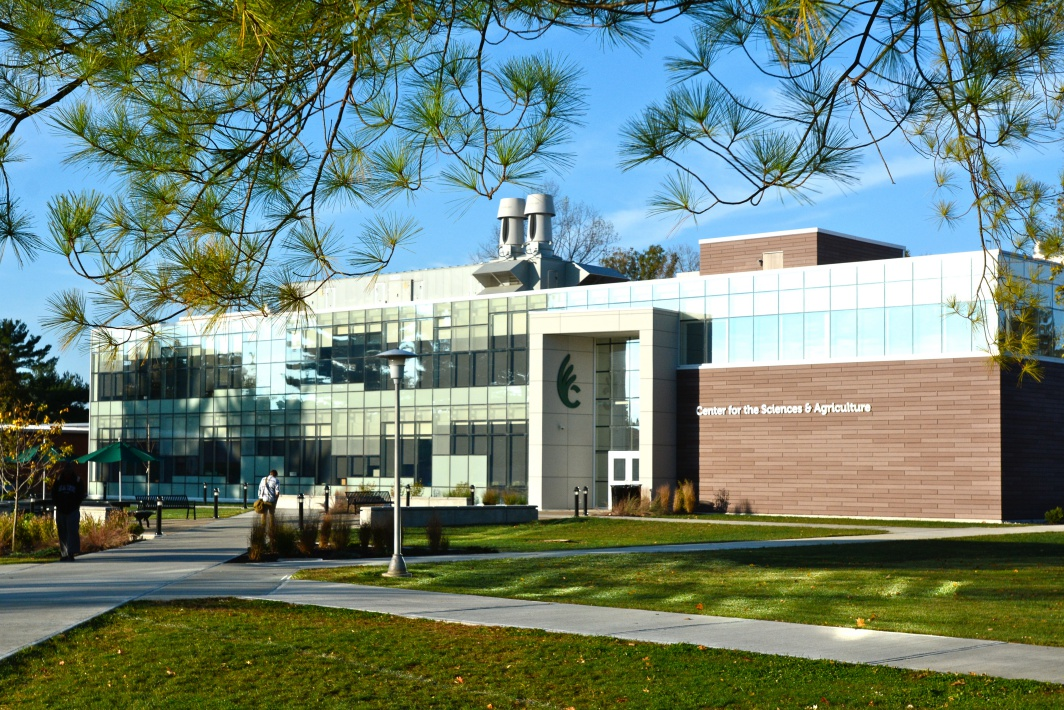
  Center for the Sciences and Agriculture

=== Peace Resource Center ===
Rooted in Wilmington College's Quaker identity, the Peace Resource Center is the only academic center and archives in the United States wholly devoted to the human experience of nuclear war, vis-a-vis the atomic bombings of Hiroshima and Nagasaki, Japan on August 6 and 9, 1945. Founded by Quaker nuclear abolitionist Barbara Leonard Reynolds in 1975, the PRC houses the Barbara Reynolds Memorial Archives, which is one of the most extensive collections in the United States focusing on the historical legacies of nuclear warfare on human beings and the environment. The PRC's collection also distinctively features significant documentation of the early nuclear abolition movements in Japan and the United States during the 1950s, 1960s, and 1970s. Scholars from throughout the United States and the world travel to utilize the PRC and its materials. The PRC also realizes extensive programming at the Wilmington College and beyond regarding nuclear legacies as well as nonviolent conflict transformation to promote the end of militarism as a strategy of resolving human conflict.

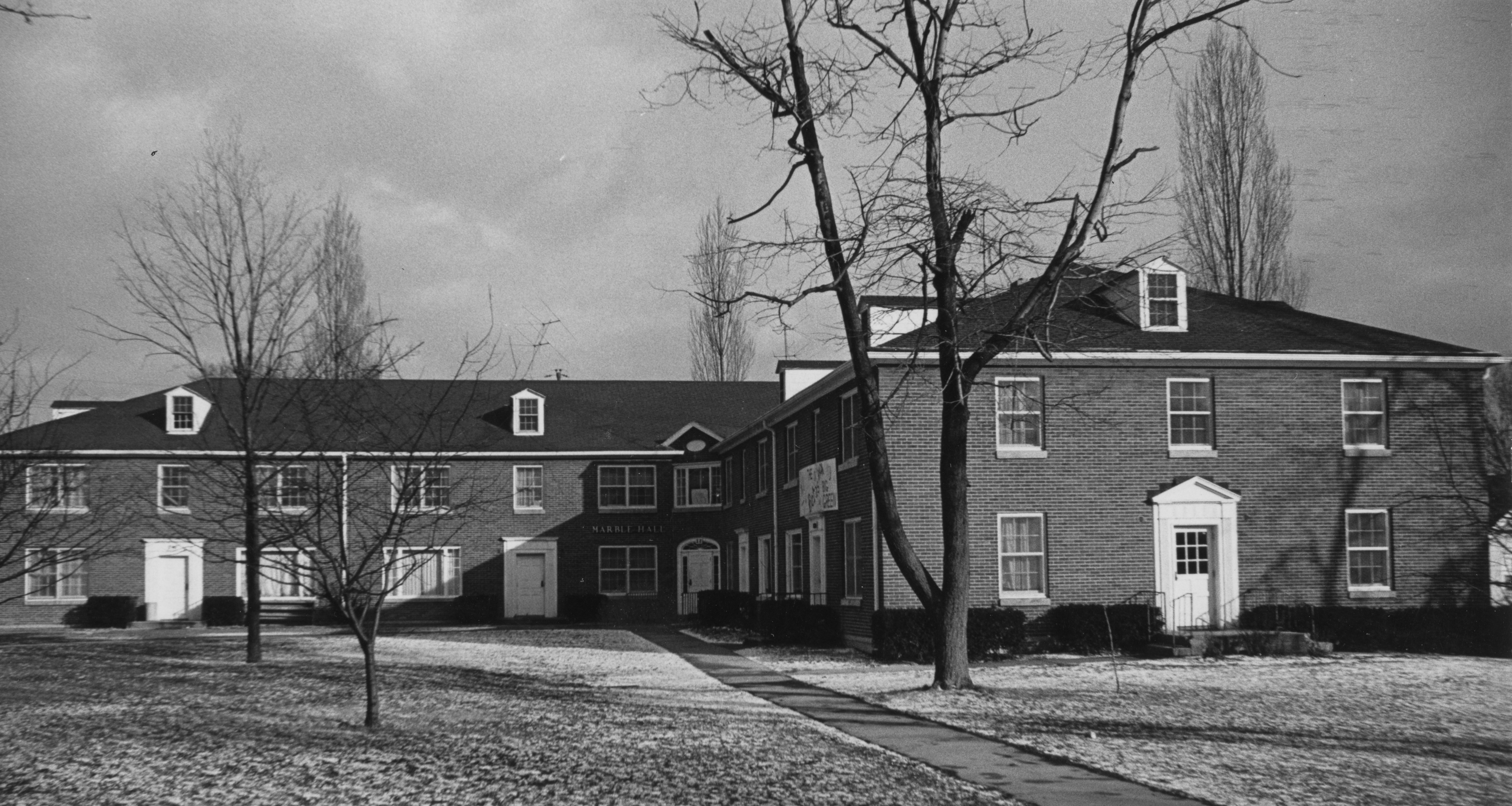
Marble Hall shortly after completion

=== Residence halls ===
- Denver Hall (1925): Historic residence hall for fifty students.
- Marble Hall (1948): Residence hall built by students led by College president Samuel Marble. The building was dedicated with an Ohio Historical Marker in 2013.
- Friends Hall (1955): Residence halls in the center of campus for men and women.
- Austin Pickett Hall (1965): Two large joining buildings housing freshman residence halls. In 2023, the college announced major renovations to Austin-Pickett Halls.
- Campus Village (1998): Apartment-style residence buildings
- College Commons (2001): Townhouse units for upperclassmen

== Greek life ==
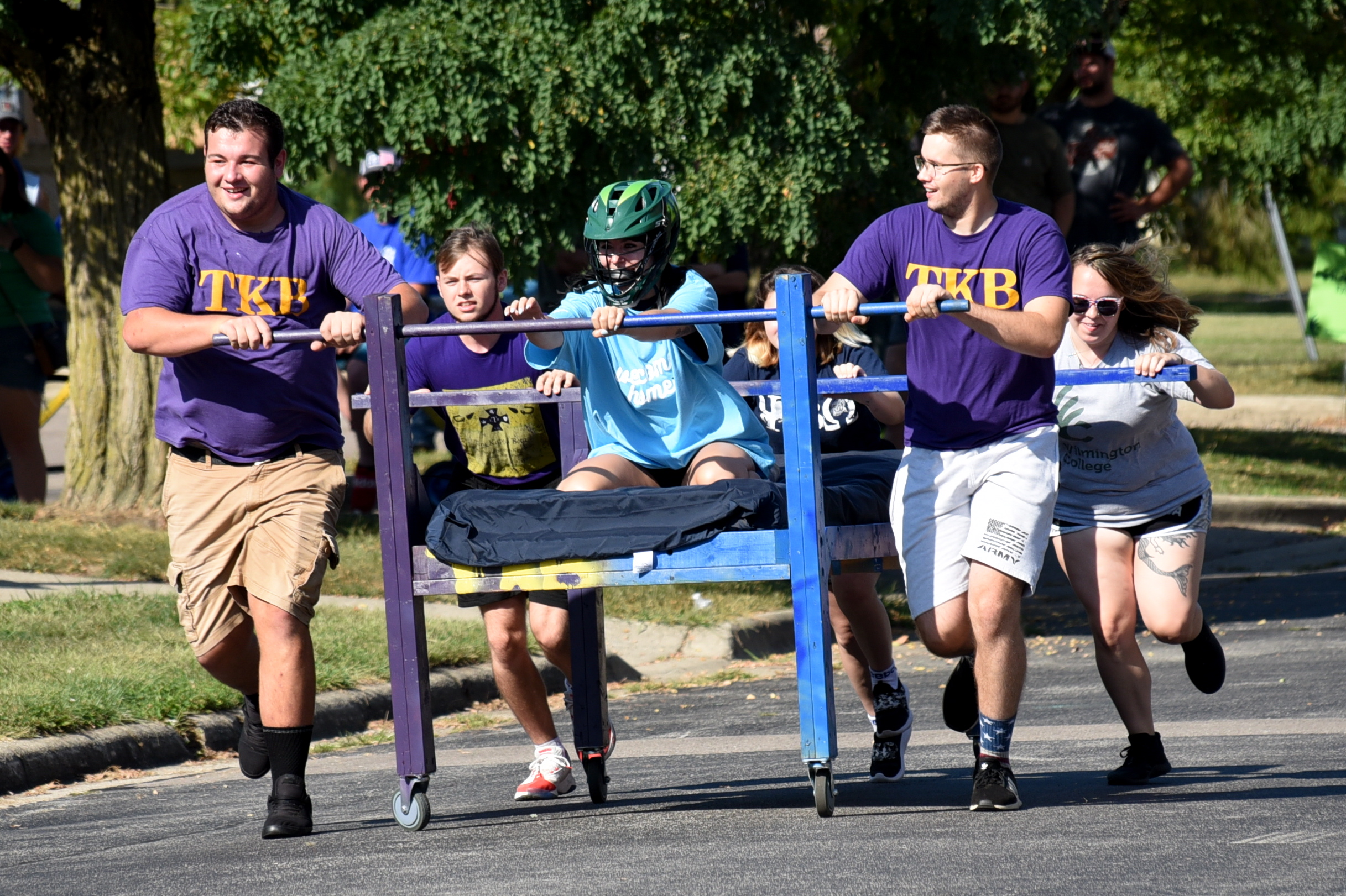
Wilmington College Greek life participates yearly in Greek Bed Races at Homecoming.

Wilmington College recognizes thirteen Greek Letter Organizations: three national fraternities, three local fraternities, two national sororities and three local sororities, and two auxiliaries. This group of thirteen Greek organizations constitutes the membership of the Greek Council. Additionally, Wilmington College hosts several honor societies, some international in scope.

== Athletics ==
Wilmington Quakers
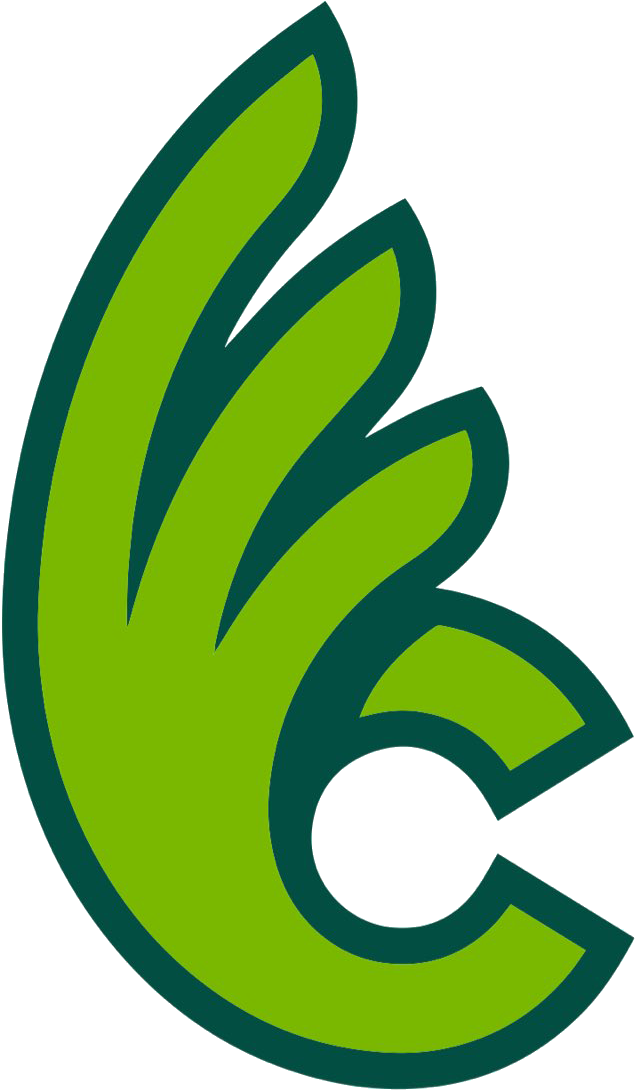
- University: Wilmington College
- Nickname: Quakers
- NCAA: Division III
- Conference: Ohio Athletic Conference
- Athletic director: Matt Croci
- Location: Wilmington, Ohio
- Varsity teams: 19
- Football stadium: Williams Stadium
- Basketball arena: Fred Raizk Arena at Hermann Court
- Baseball stadium: Tewksbury Delaney Field
- Aquatics center: WC Natatorium at Hermann Court
- Colors: Dark Green, Lime Green, and White
- Mascot: Quakerman
- Website: wilmingtonquakers.com

Team NCAA championships
- 1

Wilmington College athletic teams are known as the "Quakers". Their colors are dark green and lime green. The Quakers compete at the NCAA Division III level and have been a member of the Ohio Athletic Conference (OAC) since 2000.

Wilmington College offers nine men's teams and nine women's teams, including:

Men's sports	Women's sports
Baseball	Basketball
Basketball	Cross country
Cross country	Soccer
Football	Softball
Lacrosse	Swimming
Soccer	Track and field
Swimming	Volleyball
Track and field	Tennis
Wrestling	Golf
Golf
Tennis

Before becoming a member of the NCAA, Wilmington's teams competed in the NAIA.

Wilmington was previously a member of the Association of Mideast Colleges from 1990 to 1996 and served as an independent until 1998. WC was in the Heartland Collegiate Athletic Conference from 1998 to 1999, before joining the OAC in 2000. Wilmington's conference opponents include: Baldwin Wallace University, Capital University, Heidelberg University, John Carroll University, Marietta College, University of Mount Union, Muskingum University, Ohio Northern University, and Otterbein University.

=== National champions ===
Wilmington has had nine individual National Champions - eight track & field, one cross country, and one wrestling, as well as one team National Championship. Only one athlete (Faith Duncan) is a multiple-time national champion.

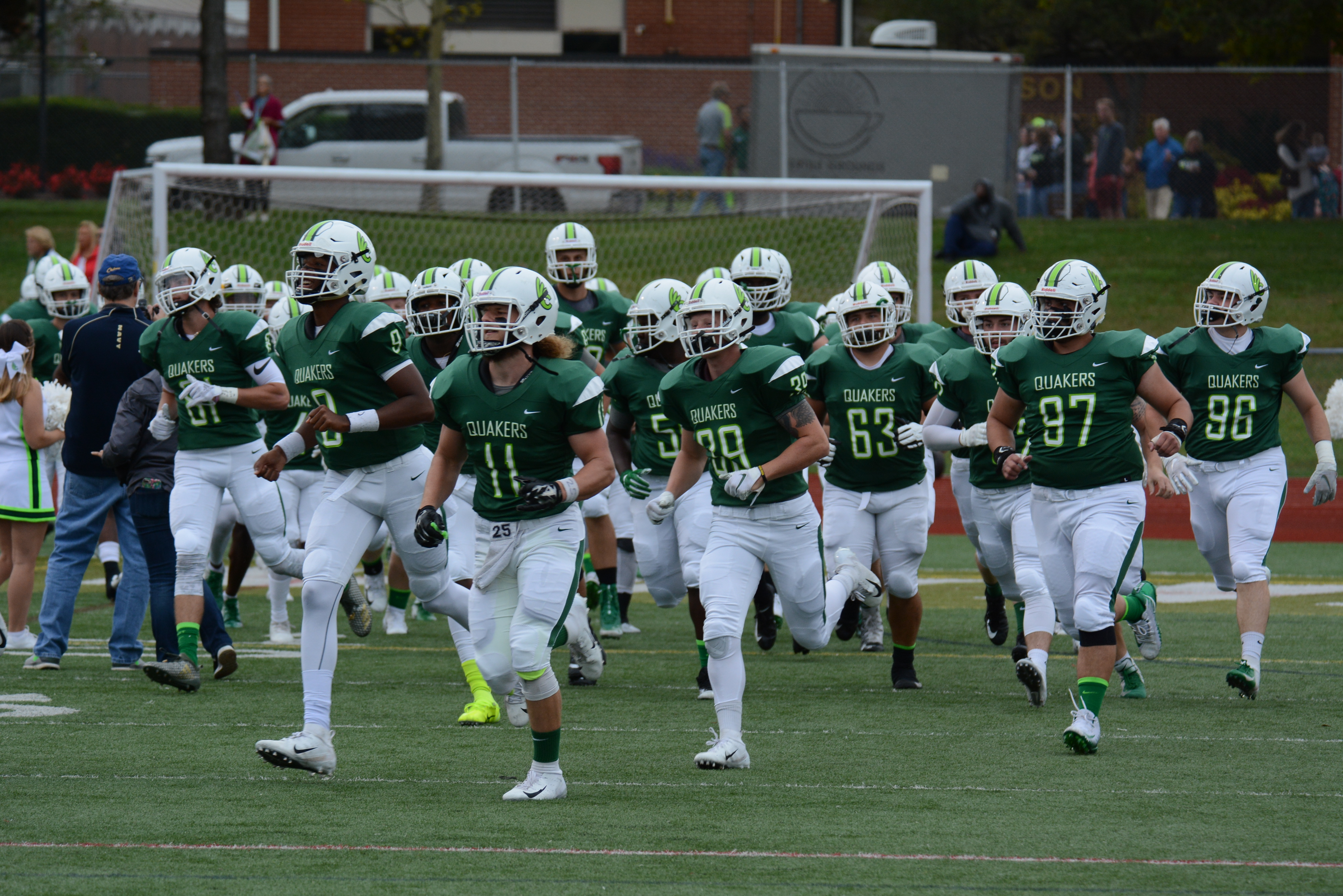
Wilmington College football players take the field in 2018

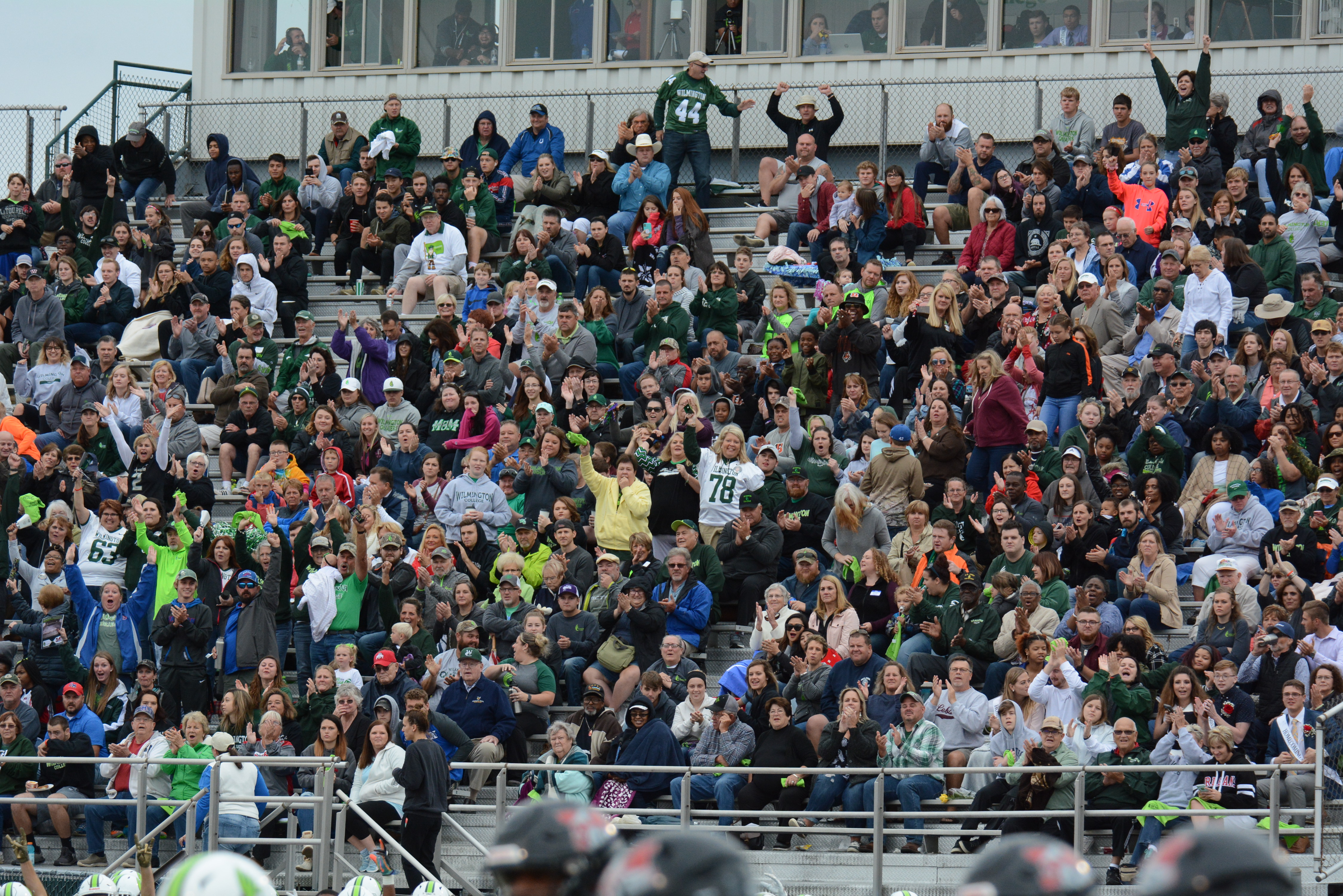
Fans Cheering on the Quakers

- Nyhla Rothwell: 1997 NCAA Division III indoor high-jump
- Jimmy Wallace: 2002 NCAA Division III Wrestling 157 lb
- Women's Basketball: 2004 NCAA Division III National Champions
- Emily Herring: 2004 NCAA Division III indoor high-jump
- Doreen Nagawa: 2005 NCAA Division III outdoor triple-jump
- Ashley Johnson: 2006 NCAA Division III outdoor pole vault
- Callen Martin: 2010 NCAA Division III indoor 55m dash
- Christian Patterson: 2014 NCAA Division III outdoor high-jump
- Brady Vilvens: 2023 NCAA Division III outdoor high-jump
- Faith Duncan: 2024 & 2025 NCAA Division III outdoor 5000m
- Faith Duncan: 2024 NCAA Division III Cross Country Individual 6K
- JJ Durr: 2025 NCAA Division III Weight Throw Indoor Track & Field
- Nathan Borgan: 2025 NCAA Division III Hammer Throw Indoor Track & Field
- Faith Duncan: 2025 NCAA Division III Indoor Track & Field 3000 meter run

=== Conference champions-NCAA Era ===
- Men's Basketball: '10, '14
- Women's Basketball: '92, '99, '98, '00, '99 '02, '03, '05, '07, '08
- Men's Soccer: '92, '93, '94, '95, '98, '99, '00, '04
- Women's Soccer: '93, '94, '95, '98, '99, '00, '02, '03
- Men's Track & Field: '01
- Women's Track & Field: '99, '00, '01

=== Notable Quaker athletics alumni ===
- Bill Ramseyer: Football Coach, 1972–1990 / Athletic Director, 1975–1988
- Kirk Mee '61: Baseball, Football, Track
- Charles "Shifty" Bolen: Football Coach, 1923–29
- Bud Lewis, Soccer Coach 1975–2017
- Peter Nilsson: Soccer, 1997, represented Västra Frölunda IF in the 1999 Allsvenskan

=== Cincinnati Bengals ===
Wilmington College was the location of summer training camp for the Cincinnati Bengals of the National Football League from the team's first season in 1968 through 1996, when the team moved camp to Georgetown College in Georgetown, Kentucky.

== Notable alumni ==
- Willis Todhunter Ballard, novelist
- Thomas Kelly ‘13, Professor Emeritus
- Tom Blackburn, college basketball coach
- J. Brent Bill, author, current Chairman of the Board of Trustees
- Satch Davidson, professional baseball umpire
- Michelle Gorelow, politician
- Thomas Raymond Kelly, theologian and author
- Joseph Haines Moore, astronomer
- Stanley Plumly, poet
- Gary Sandy, actor
- André De Shields, actor
- Arthur R. M. Spaid, educator, school administrator, lecturer, and writer

Alumni of Lebanon University which merged with Wilmington College in 1917 include:

- Stanley P. V. Arnold, politician and newspaper editor
- Horatio C. Claypool, politician
- Myers Y. Cooper, politician
- Clement L. Brumbaugh, politician
- Francis B. De Witt, politician
- Lucien J. Fenton, politician
- William T. Fitzgerald, politician
- John W. Harreld, politician
- Cordell Hull, politician
- James R. Keaton, judge
- Isaac C. Ketler, religious scholar
- Andrew Armstrong Kincannon, academic administrator
- Monroe Henry Kulp, politician
- John J. Lentz, politician
- John A. McDowell, politician
- Thomas Corwin Mendenhall, physicist and meteorologist
- Stephen Morgan, politician
- Will E. Neal, politician
- Miner G. Norton, politician
- James D. Post, politician
- John M. Robsion, politician
- F. E. Riddle (judge), judge
- Addison E. Southard, diplomat
- George M. Wertz, politician
- Edward E. Moore, politician
- Mary Creegan Roark, academic administrator
