= 2017 SAFV NLA =

2017 SAFV NLA shows the results of the 2017 season of the top Swiss American football league, the Nationalliga A. The Calanda Broncos won their 8th title that year.

== Regular season standings ==
	Team	W	L	PCT	PF	PA
1	Calanda Broncos	9	1	0.900	376	168
2	Basel Gladiators	6	4	0.600	238	238
3	Bern Grizzlies	5	5	0.500	233	137
4	Winterthur Warriors	5	5	0.500	223	257
5	Geneva Seahawks	4	6	0.400	256	282
6	LUCAF	1	9	0.100	105	349

== Playoffs ==
=== Semifinals ===
Home team	Visitor Team	Score
Basel Gladiators	Bern Grizzlies	14-7
Calanda Broncos	Winterthur Warriors	49-15

=== Relegation NLA - Liga B ===
Home team	Visitor Team	Score
Luzern Lions	LUCAF	68-40

== Swiss Bowl XXXII ==
The Calanda Broncos won their 8th title.

Home team	Visitor Team	Score
Calanda Broncos	Basel Gladiators	42-6
