= Sasha Glavic =

Canadian football player (born 1983)

No. 47
- Position: Linebacker

Personal information
- Born: May 9, 1983 (age 43); Pickering, Ontario, Canada
- Listed height: 6 ft 3 in (1.91 m)
- Listed weight: 191 lb (87 kg)

Career information
- University: Windsor Lancers
- CFL draft: 2006: undrafted

Career history
- 2006–2008: Hamilton Tiger-Cats
- 2009: Saskatchewan Roughriders*
- 2009: Hamilton Tiger-Cats
- 2010–2012: Calanda Broncos
- * Offseason or practice squad member only
- Stats at CFL.ca

Sasha Glavic (born May 3, 1983) is a Canadian former professional football linebacker for the Hamilton Tiger-Cats of the Canadian Football League from 2006-2009. He was originally signed as an undrafted free agent by the Hamilton Tiger-Cats in 2006. Glavic played for the Calanda Broncos in Switzerland Nationalliga A (American football) from 2010-2012.

He played CIS football for the Windsor Lancers.

== Professional career ==
=== Canadian Football League ===
Glavic signed with the Hamilton Tiger-Cats in May 2006 and attended the 2006 Hamilton Tiger-Cats season training camp before being released on June 3 to return to the Windsor Lancers for his final season of CIS football.

Glavic returned to the Ti-Cats for the 2007 Hamilton Tiger-Cats season and made his CFL debut on June 30, 2007. He played in nine games before being placed on the injured list for week 10 and the reserve list for week 11. In the 2008 Hamilton Tiger-Cats season, he played in 10 games, was on injured list for 7, and inactive for 1 game. His 13 special team tackles were the second-most amongst Ti-Cats in 2008.

On May 1, 2009, Glavic was traded to the Saskatchewan Roughriders along with the first selection in the third-round of the 2009 CFL draft in exchange for Yannick Carter, Brandon Myles, and the Roughriders sixth-place selection in the third-round of the 2009 CFL Draft. Glavic was released by the Roughriders on June 25, 2009, at the conclusion of 2009 Saskatchewan Roughriders season training camp. The Hamilton Tiger-Cats re-signed Glavic on September 15, 2009.

=== Europe & Swiss National League ===
From 2010-2012, Glavic played for the Calanda Broncos in the Swiss Nationalliga A with his brother Marko Glavic. They won the 2010 EFAF Cup and the Swiss Bowl 2010-2012. The team also upset the favored Vienna Vikings from the Austrian Football League 27-14, in the 2012 European Championship Eurobowl, the final game of the European Football League.
