= Bill Ramseyer =

American football coach, player, and administrator (1936–2021)

Biographical details
- Born: November 29, 1936
- Died: February 18, 2021 (aged 84)

Playing career

Football
- 1957: Bluffton

Coaching career (HC unless noted)

Football
- 1958–1959: Ansonia HS (OH)
- 1960: Blume HS (OH)
- 1961: Plymouth HS (OH)
- 1962–1964: Firelands HS (OH)
- 1965: Brunswick HS (OH)
- 1966–1967: Bluffton (assistant)
- 1969–1971: Missouri (LB)
- 1972–1990: Wilmington (OH)
- 1991–2001: Clinch Valley / Virginia–Wise

Baseball
- 1967–1968: Bluffton

Administrative career (AD unless noted)
- 1975–1988: Wilmington (OH)

Head coaching record
- Overall: 176–104–4 (college football); 16–17 (college baseball)
- Tournaments: Football; 2–5 (NAIA D-II playoffs)

Accomplishments and honors

Championships
- Football; 3 Hoosier–Buckeye (1980, 1982–1983)

Bill Ramseyer (November 29, 1936 – February 18, 2021) was an American football coach, player of football and baseball, and college athletics administrator.

== College career ==
Before his coaching career, Ramseyer competed on both the football and track and field teams at Bluffton University.

He served as the head football coach at Wilmington College in Wilmington, Ohio from 1972 to 1990 and at the University of Virginia's College at Wise from 1991 to 2001 compiling a career college football record of 176–104–4. Ramseyer led Wilmington to three NAIA playoff appearances in 1980, 1982, and 1983, reaching the Division II National Championship game in 1980. Ramseyer was inducted into both schools' hall of fame.

== Europe ==
In 2009-10, Ramseyer was head coach of the Winterthur Warriors in Switzerland Nationalliga A (American football). The Warriors reached the Swiss league playoffs semi-final in 2009, losing to the Calanda Broncos. Randy Hippeard, Ramseyer's former star quarterback at Virginia-Wise was signed and was the Warriors starting QB in 2009-2010.

== College head coaching record ==
=== College football ===
Year	Team	Overall	Conference	Standing	Bowl/playoffs
Wilmington Quakers (Hoosier–Buckeye Conference) (1972–1985)
1972	Wilmington	5–4	4–3	T–3rd	
1973	Wilmington	5–3	4–3	T–4th	
1974	Wilmington	5–3	4–3	4th	
1975	Wilmington	6–2–1	5–2–1	2nd	
1976	Wilmington	5–3–1	5–2–1	4th	
1977	Wilmington	6–3	6–2	T–3rd	
1978	Wilmington	5–4	4–4	T–4th	
1979	Wilmington	5–4	5–3	4th	
1980	Wilmington	10–2	7–1	T–1st	L NAIA Division II Championship
1981	Wilmington	6–3	5–3	T–3rd	
1982	Wilmington	8–2	7–1	T–1st	L NAIA Division II Quarterfinal
1983	Wilmington	8–2	6–1	T–1st	L NAIA Division II Quarterfinal
1984	Wilmington	6–2–1	4–1–1	T–2nd	
1985	Wilmington	7–2	4–2	3rd	
Wilmington Quakers (NAIA Division II independent) (1986–1989)
1986	Wilmington	6–3			
1987	Wilmington	5–4			
1988	Wilmington	7–2–1			
1989	Wilmington	5–5			
Wilmington Quakers (NCAA Division III independent) (1990)
1990	Wilmington	4–5			
Wilmington:		114–58–4	70–31–4		
Clinch Valley / Virginia–Wise Highland Cavaliers (NAIA Division II independent) (1991–2001)
1991	Clinch Valley	2–6			
1992	Clinch Valley	3–7			
1993	Clinch Valley	6–4			
1994	Clinch Valley	6–4			
1995	Clinch Valley	10–2			L NAIA Division II First Round
1996	Clinch Valley	10–1			L NAIA Division II First Round
1997	Clinch Valley	6–3			
1998	Clinch Valley	4–5			
1999	Virginia–Wise	6–3			
2000	Virginia–Wise	3–7			
2001	Virginia–Wise	6–4			
Clinch Valley / Virginia–Wise:		62–46			
Total:		176–104–4			
National championship Conference title Conference division title or championship game berth
