= Chris Markey =

American football player (born 1985)

No. 28
- Position: Running back

Personal information
- Born: September 23, 1985 (age 41); La Place, Louisiana, U.S.
- Listed height: 5 ft 10 in (1.78 m)
- Listed weight: 215 lb (98 kg)

Career information
- High school: Jesuit (New Orleans, Louisiana)
- College: UCLA
- NFL draft: 2008: undrafted

Career history
- Billings Outlaws (2009–2010); Zurich Renegades (Switzerland) (2011–2012)

Awards and highlights
- NLA Offensive MVP (2011); UCLA team MVP (2006); Sun Bowl Game MVP (2005)

Christopher Henry Markey (born September 23, 1985) is an American former football player. He played college football for the UCLA Bruins from 2004 to 2007. He started in the 2006 and 2007 seasons, and also briefly began in the 2004 season after Maurice Jones-Drew was injured. Markey later played professionally in Europe for two seasons in the Swiss Nationalliga A.

== Early life ==
Chris was born to parents of African-American descent, who are products of Southeastern Louisiana. As an adolescent in Luling, Louisiana, Markey began playing several types of sports, but often cites football as his main sport. Markey started his career in sports by joining the recreational teams.

At Jesuit High School in New Orleans, Louisiana, Markey lettered in three sports: football, basketball, and track and field. Markey earned numerous accolades and achievements during his high school years. He was named District triple jump champion and was selected to the All-District team within two-year. Rated as the nation's No. 21 tailback by Tom Lemming, Markey was a Tom Lemming All-American and a four-star tailback prospect by Max Emfinger. Markey ranked No. 53 among running backs by rivals.com. In 2003, Markey was named Mr. Football in the state of Louisiana. In addition, he rushed for more yards than any player in the history of New Orleans prep football, totaling 2,837 rushing yards and 46 touchdowns as a senior. Markey also accounted for 3,504 all-purpose yards on 382 touches. Markey was named "Legend of the Game" by his high school alma mater, Jesuit High School of New Orleans, Louisiana, on September 7, 2012.

College recruiting
Name	Hometown	School	Height	Weight	40^{‡}	Commit date
Chris Markey; RB	La Place, Louisiana	Jesuit High School	5 ft 10 in (1.78 m)	195 lb (88 kg)	4.5	Jan 21, 2004
Chris Markey; RB	Recruit ratings: Scout: Rivals: (--)					
Overall recruit ranking: Scout: 83 (RB) Rivals: 53 (RB) ESPN: --
Note: In many cases, Scout, Rivals, 247Sports, On3, and ESPN may conflict in their listings of height and weight.; In these cases, the average was taken. ESPN grades are on a 100-point scale.; Sources: "UCLA Football Commitments". Rivals.; "2004 UCLA Football Commits". Scout.; "ESPN". ESPN.; "Scout.com Team Recruiting Rankings". Scout.; "2004 Team Ranking". Rivals.com.

== College career ==
=== 2004 season ===
As a true freshman, Markey ran for 350 yards and ranked seventh in the Pac-10 with the help of his 22.2 kickoff return average, which also placed him at third on the Bruin roster and 17th in the Conference. Markey's breakout performance came in a game against Oregon. Markey became the sixth true freshman of the season to start a game, opening in place of injured Maurice Jones-Drew. Markey rushed for a season-high 131 yards and led the Bruins with five receptions for 84 yards including his 23-yard kickoff return, Markey accounted for 238 all-purpose yards and his 29-yard run to the three-yard line immediately preceded Manuel White's touchdown that broke a 7–7 tie and his 50-yard catch and run set up White's second TD that gave UCLA a 21–3 lead. Markey was named the Pac-10 Offensive Player of the Week for his efforts.

=== 2005 season ===
In his second year, Markey ranked second on the team in rushing with 561 yards. He also ranked second on the team in all-purpose yards with 1,223 all-purpose yards and fourth on the team with 5 touchdowns. Markey played in all 12 games and started against USC. In the season-opener at San Diego State, he returned two kickoffs for 91 yards (including one for 71 yards) and also returned a punt 41 yards. His best performance of the season occurred in the Sun Bowl. In that game against Northwestern, Markey rushed for 161 yards on 24 carries and won co-MVP honors.

=== 2006 season ===
Markey started all 13 of UCLA's games in 2006. On the year, he averaged 85.2 yards on the ground and 105.9 all-purpose yards per game. By the end of the season, he ranked 4th in the Pac-10 and 32nd nationally in rushing yards (85.15), and 8th in the Pac-10 and 56th in the NCAA in all-purpose yards (105.92). By the end of the season, Markey became the 14th Bruin to rush for 2,000 yards in his career. Markey also led the team with 35 receptions and became the first Bruin since Kermit Alexander in 1962 to lead the team in both rushing and receptions in a single year. His 1,107 rushing yards on the year rank 11th on UCLA's single-season list. That was also the most by a Bruin since 2001. In 2006, Markey was named a member of the Doak Walker Award Pre-Season Watch List, UCLA's co-Most Valuable Player, and received an All-Pac-10 honorable mention. He had a career-high 208 yards on 23 carries against Rice: the 14th highest total in school history. In that game, he had 4 runs of at least 20 yards (43, 36, 31, and 20) and 3 others of at least 10 yards.

=== 2007 season ===
Markey entered his senior season as one of the top running backs in the Pac-10 Conference. On the year, he rushed for 715 yards (4.1 average) and three touchdowns, and his average of 59.6 yards per game was 11th in the Pac-10. He had his best game of the year against Washington, in which he rushed for 193 yards (the second-highest total of his career) and one touchdown on just 14 carries. His one touchdown came on a 72-yard run, which was the longest of his career. Markey ended his career 8th on the UCLA career rushing list with 579 carries for 2,733 yards and 3rd all-time on the career all-purpose yardage list with 4,225 (2,733 rushing, 645 receiving, 579 punt returning, and 790 kick returning). He also had 8 games in which he rushed for 100 or more yards.

== Professional career ==
Markey played for the Billings Outlaws of the Indoor Football League in 2009 and 2010, winning two league championships.

In 2011 and 2012, Markey played two seasons for the Zurich Renegades in the Swiss Nationalliga A. Markey was the Swiss league offensive MVP in 2011. In 2012, he helped the team reach the league semi-finals. Dave Ritchie served as the team's head coach.
