= Randy Hippeard =

American football player (born 1985)

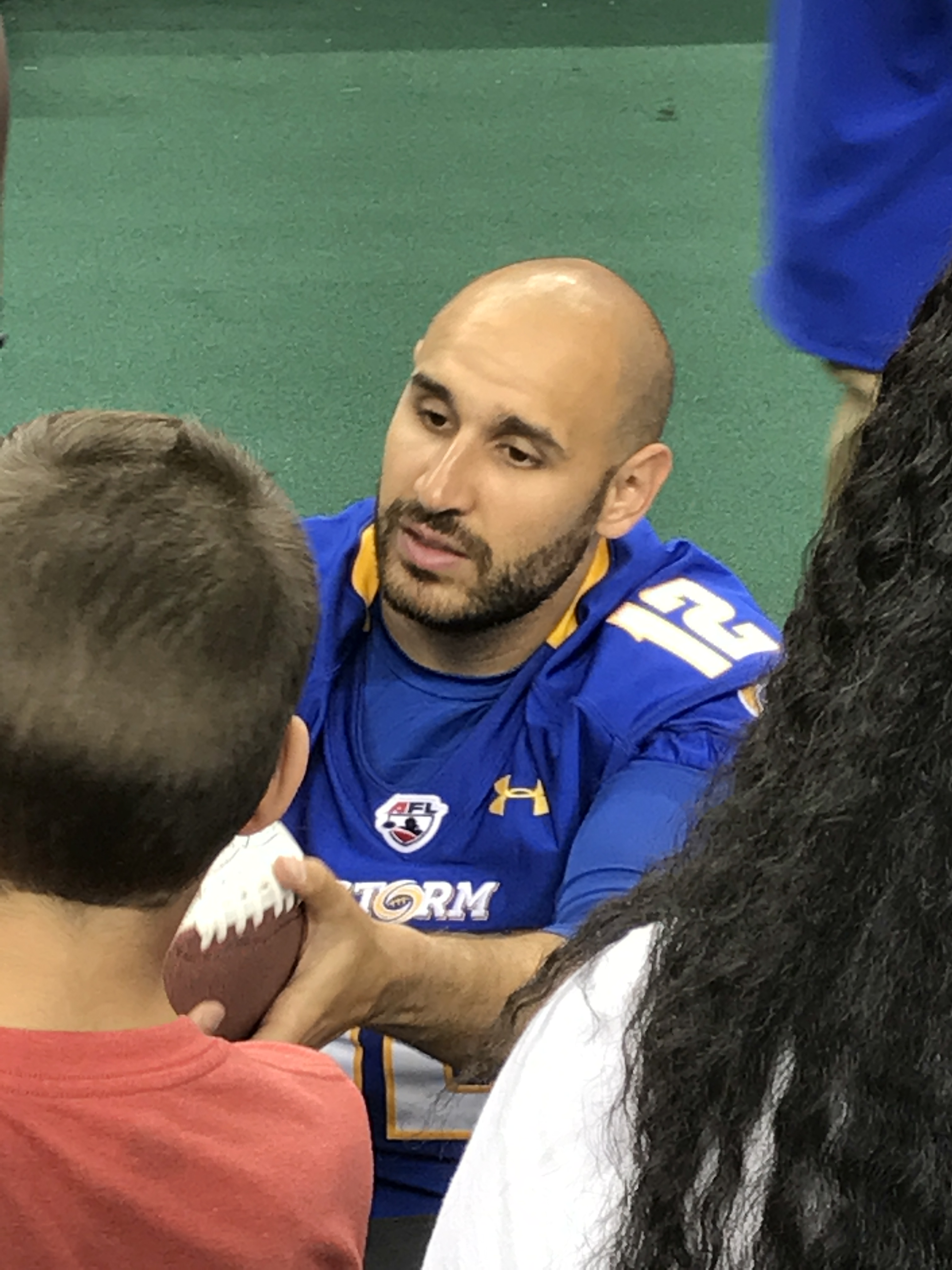
- Hippeard with the Tampa Bay Storm in 2017

No. 12
- Position: Quarterback

Personal information
- Born: December 6, 1985 (age 40); Stafford, Virginia, U.S.
- Listed height: 6 ft 3 in (1.91 m)
- Listed weight: 205 lb (93 kg)

Career information
- High school: Colonial Forge (Stafford)
- College: Virginia–Wise
- NFL draft: 2009: undrafted

Career history
- Winterthur Warriors (2009–2010); Columbus Lions (2012); Knoxville NightHawks (2013); Tampa Bay Storm (2013–2014); Orlando Predators (2015–2016); Tampa Bay Storm (2017); Baltimore Brigade (2018); Atlantic City Blackjacks (2019); Nashville Kats (2024)

Awards and highlights
- First-team All-Arena (2017); Second-team All-Arena (2018); AFL MVP (2017); AFL Offensive Player of the Year (2017); AFL passing yards leader (2017); Second-team All-PIFL (2012); Mid-South Conference Player of the Year (2008)

Career AFL statistics
- Comp. / Att.: 1,700 / 2,596
- Passing yards: 19,689
- TD–INT: 413–59
- QB rating: 118.37
- Rushing TD: 46
- Stats at ArenaFan.com

Randy Hippeard (born December 6, 1985) is an American former professional football quarterback who played in the Arena Football League (AFL). He is currently the offensive coordinator for the Billings Outlaws of Arena Football One (AF1). He was signed by the Winterthur Warriors of Nationalliga A in Switzerland as an undrafted free agent in 2009. He played college football at University of Virginia's College at Wise.

== Early life ==
Hippeard attended Colonial Forge High School in Stafford, Virginia. Hippeard played both football and baseball at Colonial Forge. As a junior in 2002, Hippeard threw for 1,503 yards and 13 touchdown passes. As a senior in 2003, he threw for 2,223 yards and 22 touchdown passes.

== College career ==
Hippeard chose to continue his football career at the University of Virginia's College at Wise. Hippeard started every game for the Cavaliers except the final three of his freshman season. He earned Victory Sports Network NAIA Honorable Mention All-American honors in 2006 and 2007 and CollegeFanz Sports Network NAIA Honorable Mention All-American honors in 2008. Hippeard set 24 single-season records for the Cavaliers and finished with the 4th most passing yards in NAIA history when his career ended. In 2014, he was inducted into the Virginia–Wise Highland Cavaliers Athletics Hall of Fame.

== Professional career ==
Hippeard was rated the 85th best quarterback in the 2009 NFL draft by NFLDraftScout.com.

=== Winterthur Warriors ===
In 2009-2010, Hippeard signed and played for the Winterthur Warriors of the Nationalliga A in Switzerland. With the Warriors he played for his former college head coach Bill Ramseyer during both seasons. Hippeard was the starting quarterback. He helped lead the Warriors to the semi-finals of the Nationalliga A (American football) playoffs in 2009, losing to the Calanda Broncos.

=== Columbus Lions ===
In 2012, Hippeard played for the Columbus Lions of the Professional Indoor Football League (PIFL). Through 7 games, Hippeard was the leading passer in the PIFL. Hippeard was named second-team All-PIFL for his play.

=== Knoxville NightHawks ===
In 2013, Hippeard signed with the Knoxville NightHawks of the PIFL and was named their starting quarterback.

=== Tampa Bay Storm (first stint) ===
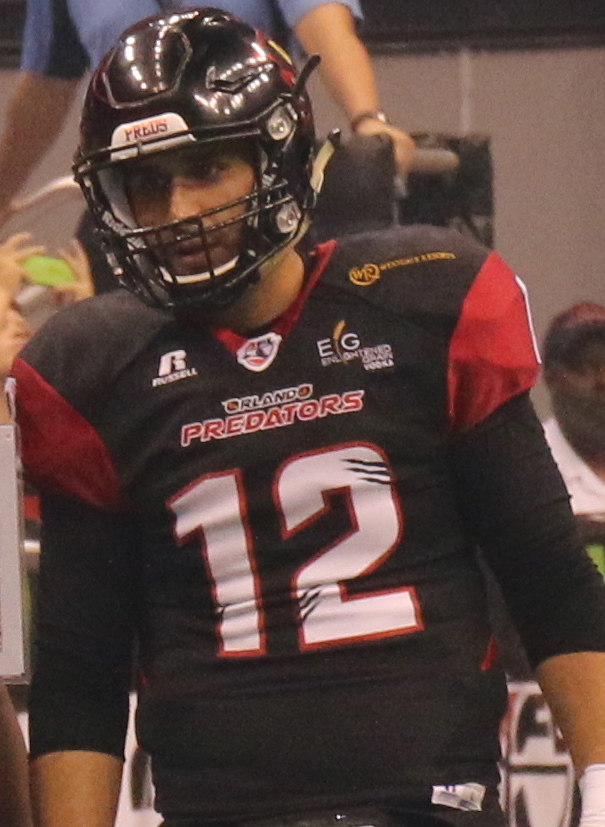
Hippeard with the Orlando Predators in 2015

On April 18, 2013, Hippeard was assigned to the Tampa Bay Storm of the Arena Football League (AFL). Hippeard saw limited action during his first 9 games with the Storm, serving as the backup to Adrian McPherson. On June 22, 2013, Hippeard made his first career start for the Storm when McPherson was placed on injured reserve. Hippeard and the Storm fell 49–50 to the Chicago Rush in his first career start, with Hippeard passing for 315 yards and 6 touchdowns. Hippeard started the next 3 games for the Storm, but the Storm lost all four of Hippeards starts in 2013, and he was benched in favor of Shane Boyd. In 2014, Hippeard became the Storm's full-time starting quarterback.

=== Orlando Predators ===
Hippeard signed with the Orlando Predators of the AFL for the 2015 season.

=== Tampa Bay Storm (second stint) ===
On October 14, 2016, Hippeard was assigned to the Storm during the dispersal draft. He threw for 3,506 yards and 80 touchdowns in 2017, earning AFL MVP, Offensive Player of the Year and first-team All-Arena honors. He helped the Storm advance to ArenaBowl XXX, where they lost to the Philadelphia Soul by a score of 44–40. The Storm folded in December 2017.

=== Baltimore Brigade ===
On March 20, 2018, Hippeard was assigned to the AFL's Baltimore Brigade.

=== Atlantic City Blackjacks ===
On March 22, 2019, Hippeard was assigned to the Atlantic City Blackjacks of the AFL.

=== Nashville Kats ===
In early June 2024, Hippeard signed with the Nashville Kats of the new Arena Football League.

== Career statistics ==
=== AFL ===
Legend
| | AFL MVP |
| | Led the league |
| **Bold** | Career high |

| Year | Team | Passing | | | | | | | Rushing | | |
| Year | Team | Cmp | Att | Pct | Yds | TD | Int | Rtg | Att | Yds | TD |
|---|---|---|---|---|---|---|---|---|---|---|---|
| 2013 | Tampa Bay | 111 | 186 | 59.7 | 1,300 | 24 | 4 | 104.46 | 17 | 40 | 5 |
| 2014 | Tampa Bay | **350** | **597** | 58.6 | **4,406** | **93** | **23** | 104.58 | **45** | **126** | **16** |
| 2015 | Orlando | 247 | 333 | **74.2** | 2,997 | 61 | 6 | **133.47** | 21 | 44 | 2 |
| 2016 | Orlando | 235 | 359 | 65.5 | 2,966 | 65 | 8 | 121.36 | 36 | 81 | 1 |
| 2017 | Tampa Bay | 328 | 494 | 66.4 | 3,506 | 80 | 8 | 119.82 | 39 | 120 | 7 |
| 2018 | Baltimore | 280 | 405 | 69.1 | 2,901 | 61 | 5 | 122.05 | 26 | 72 | 5 |
| 2019 | Atlantic City | 149 | 222 | 67.1 | 1,603 | 29 | 5 | 111.37 | 6 | 7 | 4 |
| Career | | 1,700 | 2,596 | 65.5 | 19,689 | 413 | 59 | 118.37 | 190 | 490 | 46 |

=== College ===
Hippeard's college statistics are as follows:

NAIA collegiate career statistics
Virginia–Wise Highland Cavaliers
| Season | Games | Games started | Record | Passing | | | | | | | Rushing | |
| Season | Games | Games started | Record | Comp | Att | Yards | Pct. | TD | Int | QB rating | Yards | TD |
| 2004 | Redshirt | | | | | | | | | | | |
| 2005 | 8 | 8 | 4–4 | 102 | 199 | 1,448 | 51.3 | 11 | 6 | 124.6 | 1 | 0 |
| 2006 | 11 | 11 | 8–3 | 211 | 361 | 3,100 | 58.4 | 25 | 11 | 147.3 | 10 | 2 |
| 2007 | 11 | 11 | 9–2 | 226 | 359 | 3,455 | 63.0 | 37 | 9 | 172.8 | 56 | 2 |
| 2008 | 11 | 11 | 8–3 | 217 | 354 | 3,637 | 61.3 | 38 | 9 | 177.9 | 102 | 3 |
| Totals | 41 | 41 | 29–12 | 756 | 1,273 | 11,640 | 59.4 | 111 | 35 | 159.5 | 169 | 7 |

== Coaching career ==
In early 2025, Hippeard joined the coaching staff for the Billings Outlaws of Arena Football One after retirement. He replaced Sherdrick Bonner as offensive coordinator while Bonner joined the Vice Sports broadcast team.
