= Peter Nilsson =

Peter Nilsson may refer to:

- Peter Nilsson (ice hockey) (born 1962), Swedish ice hockey player
- Peter Nilsson (footballer, born 1958), Swedish football midfielder
- Peter Nilsson (footballer, born 1974), Swedish football forward

== See also ==
- Peter Nilson (1937–1998), Swedish astronomer and novelist
