= Alex Raich =

Swiss gridiron football player (born 1996)

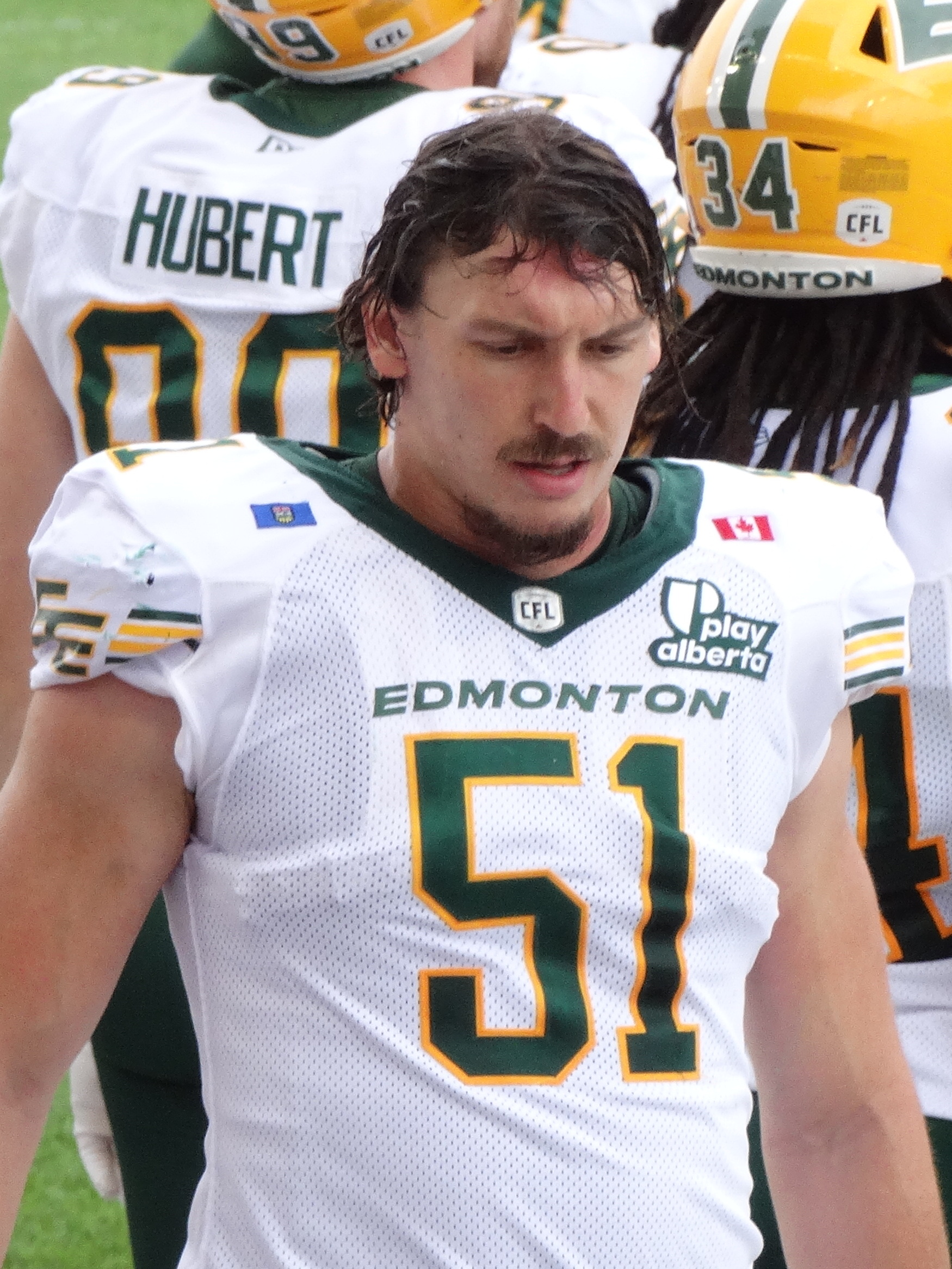
- Raich with the Edmonton Elks in 2025

No. 51 – Edmonton Elks
- Position: Linebacker
- Roster status: Suspended
- CFL status: Global

Personal information
- Born: November 17, 1996 (age 29); Switzerland
- Listed height: 6 ft 2 in (1.88 m)
- Listed weight: 225 lb (102 kg)

Career information
- High school: Quader Schulhaus (Switzerland)
- College: Kansas
- CFL draft: 2025G: 2nd round, 12th overall pick

Career history
- Edmonton Elks (2025–present)
- Stats at CFL.ca

Alex Raich (born November 17, 1996) is a Swiss professional gridiron football linebacker for the Edmonton Elks of the Canadian Football League (CFL). He played college football at Kansas.

== Early life ==
Alex Raich was born on November 17, 1996, in Switzerland. He is from Chur, Switzerland. He started playing American football at the age of 12 after being introduced to the sport by his friend's brother. For high school, Raich attended Quader Schulhaus. He also played for the Calanda Broncos of the Nationalliga A. He worked as a truck driver and auto mechanic.

== College career ==
Raich moved to the United States to play college football at Golden West College in Huntington Beach, California, as a defensive back. He played two years at Golden West. He recorded 26 tackles, one interception, and one fumble recovery as a sophomore in 2021 as the team finished 11–1.

Raich transferred to play linebacker for the Kansas Jayhawks of the University of Kansas in 2022. He appeared in two games late in the 2022 season on special teams but did not record any statistics. He played in 11 games in 2023 on special teams, but again did not record any statistics. Raich played in all 12 games, starting one, as a sixth-year senior year in 2024, totaling three solo tackles and two assisted tackles. Raich played in 236 total snaps during the 2024 season, 203 of which were on special teams.

== Professional career ==
Raich was selected by the Edmonton Elks in the second round, with the 12th overall pick, of the 2025 CFL global draft. He officially signed with the team on May 7, 2025. He was moved to the practice roster on June 1, and promoted to the active roster on July 24, 2025.
