= National Normal University =

Coordinates: 39°26′06″N 84°12′14″W

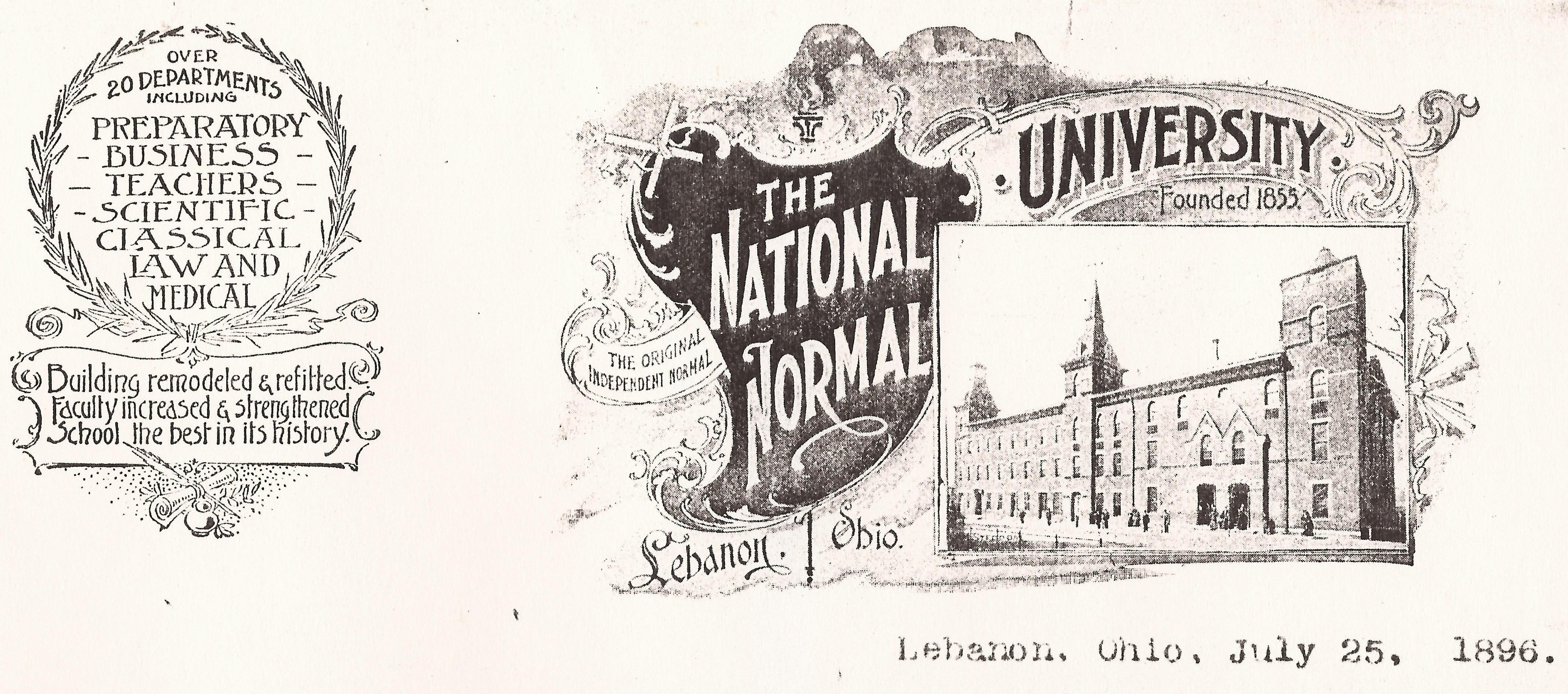
Letterhead (1896) for The National Normal University

National Normal University was a teacher's college in Lebanon, Ohio, United States. Located in southwestern Ohio, it opened in 1855 as Southwestern Normal School and took the name National Normal University in 1870. Alfred Holbrook was the first president and the school's guiding force for most of its existence. He resigned in 1897 after 42 years. In 1907 the NNU became public and changed its name to Lebanon University. The school went bankrupt in and finally closed in 1917. The school merged with Wilmington College in Wilmington, Ohio. The Warren County (Ohio) Historical Society in Lebanon, Ohio, now holds Lebanon University's records. In 1933 Alfred Holbrook College opened on the same campus. AHC moved to Manchester, Ohio where it closed in 1941. The original campus was demolished in 1977.

== Notable alumni ==
- Stanley P. V. Arnold, an Illinois state representative and newspaper editor
- Horatio C. Claypool, United States Representative from Ohio
- Myers Y. Cooper, former Governor of Ohio
- Clement L. Brumbaugh, United States Representative from Ohio
- Francis B. De Witt, United States Representative from Ohio
- Lucien J. Fenton, United States Representative from Ohio
- William T. Fitzgerald, United States Representative from Ohio
- Morgan C. Fitzpatrick, United States Representative from Tennessee
- John W. Harreld, United States Representative and Senator from Oklahoma
- Norris W. Hensley, Insurance agent from Tampa, Florida
- Cordell Hull, United States Senator from Tennessee and Secretary of State under President Franklin D. Roosevelt
- James R. Keaton, Justice of the Oklahoma Territorial Supreme Court.
- Isaac C. Ketler, Presbyterian scholar, founder of Grove City College
- Andrew Armstrong Kincannon, Chancellor of the University of Mississippi
- Monroe Henry Kulp, United States Representative from Pennsylvania
- John J. Lentz, United States Representative from Ohio
- John A. McDowell, United States Representative from Ohio
- Thomas Corwin Mendenhall, autodidact physicist and meteorologist
- Edward E. Moore, Indiana state senator and Los Angeles City Council member
- John Monroe Moore, Bishop Methodist Episcopal Church, South
- Stephen Morgan, United States Representative from Ohio
- Gilbert Nations, lawyer, professor and anti-Catholic activist
- Will E. Neal, United States Representative from West Virginia
- Miner G. Norton, United States Representative from Ohio
- H. Anna Quinby, lawyer, editor, business manager, social reformer
- James D. Post, United States Representative from Ohio
- John M. Robsion, United States Representative and Senator from Kentucky
- F. E. Riddle (judge), Attorney and Associate Justice of the Oklahoma Supreme Court
- Mary Creegan Roark, first female president of Eastern Kentucky University
- Addison E. Southard, American diplomat*
- George M. Wertz, United States Representative from Pennsylvania

== See also ==
- Normal school
