= Bud Lewis (soccer) =

American footballer

Personal information
- Full name: Leon "Bud" Lewis
- Date of birth: January 29, 1953 (age 73)
- Place of birth: Penfield, New York, United States
- Height: 6 ft 1 in (1.85 m)
- Positions: Midfielder; forward

Youth career
- 1967–1971: Penfield High School

College career
Years	Team	Apps	(Gls)
1971–1975	Bowling Green State University		

Senior career*
Years	Team	Apps	(Gls)
1975	Cincinnati Comets		
1976–1977	Buffalo Blazers		

Managerial career
- 1975–2017: Wilmington College
- * Club domestic league appearances and goals

Leon "Bud" Lewis (born January 29, 1953) is an American former professional soccer player and coach. Known for his versatility on the field as a midfielder and forward, Lewis represented the Cincinnati Comets in the American Soccer League and the Buffalo Blazers in the Canadian National Soccer League in the mid-1970s. After retiring as a player, he served as the head coach for the men's soccer team at Wilmington College between 1975 and 2017.

== Playing career ==
=== Early career ===
==== High school ====
Lewis, a native of Penfield, New York, began his competitive soccer career at Penfield High School in 1967. He was a standout player for the school's soccer team and helped lead them to a New York State Section V championship in 1970. As a result of his outstanding performance on the field, Lewis was named a National High School All-American following his senior season.

==== College ====
In 1971, Lewis won an athletic scholarship to attend Bowling Green State University in Bowling Green, Ohio. A four-year letter winner with the Bowling Green Falcons men's soccer team, he was named an NSCAA All-American in 1974. He also served as the team captain during the same season, alongside defender Steve Cabalka. Lewis' contributions to the Bowling Green Falcons soccer team were recognized in 2000 when he was inducted into the Bowling Green State University Athletic Hall of Fame.

=== Professional career ===
Following a successful collegiate career, Lewis signed his first professional contract with the American Soccer League side the Cincinnati Comets for the 1975 ASL season. After only one season with the Comets, he joined the Buffalo Blazers of the Canadian National Soccer League in 1976. In 1977, he was part of the Blazers team that played a friendly against the Serie A team Lazio at the War Memorial Stadium in Buffalo, New York. Lewis started as a forward in a 1–6 loss.

== Coaching career ==
While still actively playing professional soccer, Lewis took on the role of part-time coach for the Wilmington College men's soccer team in 1975. In 1977, he became the full-time head coach for the team, known as the Fightin' Quakers. Lewis' tenure as head coach was highly successful, leading the team to multiple NAIA District 22, Association of Mideast Colleges, Heartland Collegiate Athletic Conference, and Ohio Athletic Conference titles during the years. In 2004, Lewis was awarded the Bill Jeffrey Award for reaching more than 400 victories and for his services to the NSCAA's All-America program. He retired from coaching after the 2017 NCAA season, having served as head coach at Wilmington College for 43 consecutive seasons and racking up 506 victories in 843 games. In 2021, Lewis was inducted into the Wilmington College Athletic Hall of Fame in recognition of his coaching achievements.

== Coaching statistics ==
Coaching record by team and tenure
Team	Nat.	From	To		Record			
Team	Nat.	From	To	P	W	D	L	Win %
Wilmington College	(United States)	August 1, 1975	December 1, 2017	843	506	58	279	60.02
Total				843	506	58	279	60.02

== Honors ==
=== Player ===
Penfield High School

- New York State Section V Boys' Soccer: 1970

Bowling Green State University

- Mid-American Conference (MAC): 1973

Individual

- National High School All-American: 1970
- NSCAA All-American: 1974
- NSCAA All-Region (Midwest): 1974
- NSCAA All-Ohio: 1974
- OCSA All-Mid-American Conference (MAC): 1974
- Bowling Green State University Athletic Hall of Fame: 2000

=== Coach ===
Wilmington College

- NAIA District 22: 1979, 1981, 1983, 1985, 1989
- Association of Mideast Colleges (AMC): 1991, 1992, 1993, 1994, 1995
- Heartland Collegiate Athletic Conference (HCAC): 1998, 1999
- Ohio Athletic Conference (OAC) Regular-Season Champion: 2000, 2004
- Ohio Athletic Conference (OAC) Tournament Champion: 2004

Individual

- NAIA District 22 Coach of the Year: 8 times
- NSCAA Mideast Coach of the Year: 6 times
- Ohio Coach of the Year: 3 times
- Association of Mideast Colleges (AMC) Coach of the Year: 3 times
- Ohio Athletic Conference (OAC) Coach of the Year: 2004, 2017
- Clinton County Sports Hall of Fame: 2001
- Bill Jeffrey Award: 2004
- Wilmington College Athletic Hall of Fame: 2021
- Ohio Collegiate Soccer Association (OCSA) Hall of Fame: 2024
