= Thomas Raymond Kelly (Quaker mystic) =

American mystic (1893–1941)

Thomas Raymond Kelly (June 4, 1893 – January 17, 1941) was an American Quaker educator. He taught and wrote on the subject of mysticism. His books are widely read, especially by people interested in spirituality.

Kelly was born in 1893 in Chillicothe, Ohio, to a Quaker family (members of the Religious Society of Friends). The branch of Quakerism in which he was raised (Wilmington Yearly Meeting) had been influenced by the 19th century revivalists and worship services were similar to other low-church Protestant groups.

He graduated in 1913 from Wilmington College as a chemistry major. Then he went to Haverford College just outside Philadelphia, Pennsylvania, where he came under the mentoring of Rufus Jones, a prominent Friend. It was at this time that he came into contact with the more traditional mystical vein of the Religious Society of Friends.

Kelly went to Hartford Theological Seminary to be trained as a missionary and he desired to serve in Asia. When World War I broke out, he signed up to work for the YMCA with the troops in training at Salisbury Plain in England. He eventually worked with German prisoners of war. He was fired as he and many of his colleagues became ardent pacifists and the military did not want persons with those views to have access to military personnel. When he returned to the United States he completed his Seminary training and married Lael Macy.

Kelly taught for two years (1919–1921) at his alma mater, Wilmington College. Then he went back to Hartford Seminary where he earned a doctorate in philosophy and an induction to Phi Beta Kappa. He and his wife then went to Berlin and worked with the American Friends' Service Committee in the child feeding program, where they were instrumental in founding the Quaker community in Germany.

When he returned he was appointed head of the Philosophy Department of Earlham College in Richmond, Indiana. He was unhappy there and came to realize that he did not agree with much of his evangelical background anymore.

In 1930 Kelly began working on a second Ph.D. at Harvard. While working on this degree he taught at Wellesley College (1931–1932) and again at Earlham (1932–1935). In 1935, he went to teach at the University of Hawaii and began advanced research in Eastern philosophies.

In 1936, Kelly became a professor at Haverford College. He published the dissertation for his second doctorate in 1937, but he failed in the oral defense due to a memory lapse; this failure put Kelly into a period of grief, during which time he apparently had a spiritual awakening.

In 1938, Kelly went to Germany to deliver the annual Richard Cary Lecture at the yearly meeting of German Friends and to encourage Friends living under Hitler's regime.

Kelly received word on January 17, 1941, that Harper and Brothers was willing to meet with him to discuss the publication of a devotional book. He died of a heart attack in Haverford, Pennsylvania, later that same day. Three months later Kelly's colleague, Douglas V. Steere, submitted five of Kelly's devotional essays to the publisher along with a biographical sketch of Kelly. The book was published under the title A Testament of Devotion. Some of his other essays have been collected in a book entitled The Eternal Promise. A formal biography was written by his son, Richard Kelly in 1966, and published by Harper and Row.

== Family ==
Kelly was married to Lael and they had two children, Lois and Richard.

== Bibliography ==
- A Testament of Devotion. New York: Harper & Bros. 1941. ISBN 0-06-064361-7
- The Eternal Promise ISBN 0-944350-02-X
- Thomas Kelly, A Biography, Richard M. Kelly Harper and Row, NY, 1966, Library of Congress no. 66-11486
- Claus Bernet (2008). "Thomas Raymond Kelly (Quaker mystic)". In Bautz, Traugott (ed.). Biographisch-Bibliographisches Kirchenlexikon (BBKL) (in German). Vol. 29. Nordhausen: Bautz. cols. 749–753. ISBN 978-3-88309-452-6.
