= Daniel A. DiBiasio =

American academic administrator

11th President of Ohio Northern University
- In office August 2011 – May 2022
- Preceded by: Kendall L. Baker
- Succeeded by: Melissa J. Baumann

17th President of Wilmington College
- In office 1995–2011
- Succeeded by: James M. Reynolds

Personal details
- Born: Ohio, U.S.
- Education: Ohio Wesleyan University (BA); Ohio State University (MA, PhD)

Daniel A. DiBiasio is an American academic administrator serving as the 11th president of Ohio Northern University. DiBiasio assumed office in August 2011 after previously serving as the 17th president of Wilmington College in Wilmington, Ohio.

== Early life and education ==
DiBasio was born and raised in Ohio. He earned a Bachelor of Arts degree in English from Ohio Wesleyan University, followed by a Master of Arts and PhD from Ohio State University.

== Career ==
DiBiasio began his career as admissions counselor and dean of students at Rocky Mountain College in Billings, Montana. He later worked as assistant dean of the Ohio State University Graduate School and as executive assistant to the president and interim vice president of student affairs at the University of New Hampshire. From 1995 to 2011, DiBiasio served as the president of Wilmington College.

He was selected to serve as the 11th president of Ohio Northern University in 2011, and assumed office in August of that year. In 2017, DiBiasio managed a university capital campaign, raising $13 million in donations after setting a $15 million goal. During DiBiasio's tenure, Ohio Northern has faced budgetary issues. In 2019, 16 staff members were laid off and programs were eliminated, including German, French, and the Master of Laws degree. In 2018, it was announced that the university would increase tuition by 3.9%, the largest increase since DiBiasio took office in 2011.
