= Peter Nilsson (footballer, born 1974) =

Swedish former footballer

Personal information
- Full name: Jan Peter Nilsson
- Date of birth: 1 February 1974 (age 52)
- Place of birth: Askim, Sweden
- Position: Forward

Youth career
- Askims IK

College career
Years	Team	Apps	(Gls)
1997	Wilmington College	17	(20)
2000–2001	Southampton Colonials	34	(44)

Senior career*
Years	Team	Apps	(Gls)
- Askims IK
1999	Västra Frölunda IF	12	(1)
2001	Stjarnan	13	(2)
- Qviding FIF
- * Club domestic league appearances and goals

Jan Peter Nilsson (born 1 February 1974) is a Swedish former footballer who played as a forward. He made 12 Allsvenskan appearances for Västra Frölunda IF in 1999, scoring one goal. A former college athlete, he holds the NCAA-era record at Wilmington College for the most goals scored in a single season with 20 goals in 17 games.

== Career ==
=== Early career and Wilmington College ===
Nilsson started off his career at Askims IK before moving to the United States to play collegiately for Wilmington College's Fightin' Quakers under head coach Bud Lewis. While at Wilmington, he set the college's Men's Soccer Single Season (NCAA era) record for goals scored with 20 goals in 17 games. He was the first Wilmington College soccer player to score that many goals since All-American Steve Spirk scored 22 goals in 1979 when the college was a part of the NAIA. At the end of the 1997 season, the NSCAA named Nilsson First-Team All-Ohio and First-Team All-Mideast.

=== Allsvenskan ===
After returning to his native Sweden, Nilsson went on to play for the Allsvenskan club Västra Frölunda IF and scored 1 goal in 12 games as the team finished seventh in the table during the 1999 Allsvenskan season. In a Svenska Cupen game against Trelleborgs FF in the spring of 1999, Nilsson was involved in an on-field incident where Trelleborg's goalkeeper Daniel Andersson broke his arm. This incident infamously opened up for the then 17-year-old future Sweden national team goalkeeper Andreas Isaksson's breakthrough as Andersson's replacement.

=== Return to the United States ===
After his stint with Västra Frölunda in Allsvenskan, Nilsson returned to the United States to again play collegiate soccer, this time for Southampton College of Long Island University and its Southampton Colonials. During the 2000 NCAA season, he scored 18 goals and was the top scorer in the NYCAC, ultimately earning him a place in the NSCAA All-Northeast Regional team. The following year, during the 2001 NCAA season, he was once again the NYCAC top scorer, scoring 26 goals in 17 games which as of 2002 was the fourth best goal record in NCAA Division II history.

==== Iceland stint ====
During the summer break from college in 2001, Nilsson went together with his Southampton Colonials teammate Ragnar Árnason to Iceland to play for the Garðabær club Stjarnan in 1. deild karla – the Icelandic second tier. Nilsson scored 2 goals in 13 league games for Stjarnan during the 2001 1. deild karla season. He also scored 1 goal in 1 game in the 2001 Icelandic Cup, and 4 goals in 2 games in the 2001 Icelandic League Cup.

=== Return to Sweden ===
In 2005, he helped Qviding FIF win promotion to Superettan as the team finished first in Division 2 Västra Götaland.

== Honours ==
Qviding FIF

- Division 2 Västra Götaland: 2005

Individual

- NSCAA All-Mideast Regional team: 1997
- NSCAA All-Ohio team: 1997
- NSCAA All-Northeast Regional team: 2001
- NYCAC Men's Soccer top scorer: 2000, 2001

Records

- Wilmington College Men's Soccer Single-Season Leaders (NCAA Era) – Goals: 20 goals
