= Yannick Carter =

Canadian football player (born 1984)

No. 48
- Position: Linebacker

Personal information
- Born: February 5, 1984 (age 42); Pickering, Ontario, Canada
- Listed height: 6 ft 1 in (1.85 m)
- Listed weight: 212 lb (96 kg)

Career information
- High school: St. Mary's (Pickering)
- University: Wilfrid Laurier
- CFL draft: 2007: 3rd round, 20th overall pick

Career history
- Saskatchewan Roughriders (2007–2008); Hamilton Tiger-Cats (2009–2012); Calgary Stampeders (2013–2014)

Awards and highlights
- 2× Grey Cup champion (2007, 2014)
- Stats at CFL.ca (archive)

Yannick Carter (born February 2, 1984) is a Canadian former professional football linebacker who played in the Canadian Football League (CFL). He was drafted in the third round of the 2007 CFL draft by the Saskatchewan Roughriders. He played CIS Football at Wilfrid Laurier.

== Professional career ==
=== Saskatchewan Roughriders ===
Yannick Carter was drafted by the Roughriders in the 3rd round of the 2007 CFL draft.

=== Hamilton Tiger-Cats ===
On May 1, 2009, Carter was traded along with Brandon Myles and third round pick in the 2009 CFL draft to the Hamilton Tiger-Cats for Sasha Glavic and a third round pick.

=== Calgary Stampeders ===
After not being re-signed by the Tiger-Cats following the 2012 CFL season Carter signed with the Calgary Stampeders.
