= Williams Stadium (Wilmington) =

Football stadium in Wilmington, Ohio

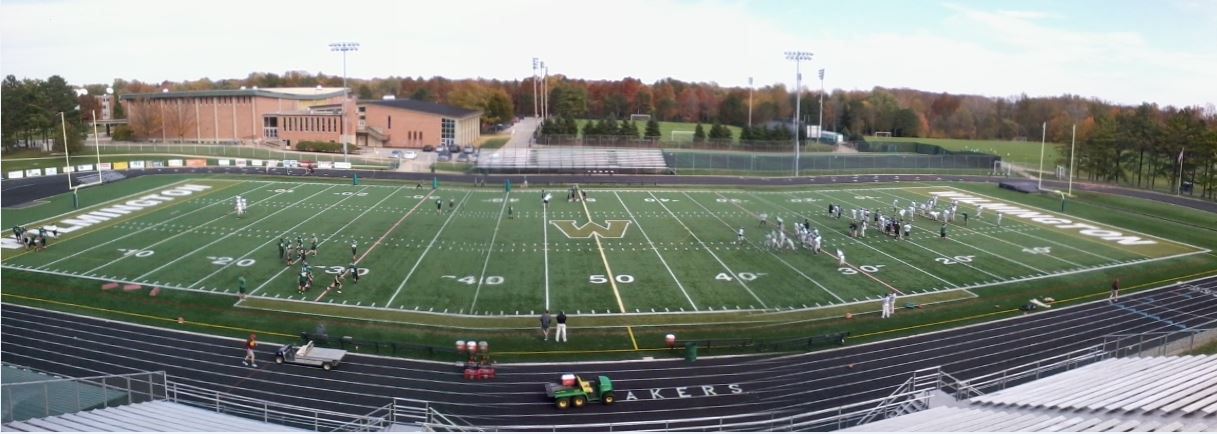
- Williams Stadium during the 2012 football season.
- Interactive map of Williams Stadium
- Full name: Townsend Field at Williams Stadium
- Location: Elm Street; Wilmington, Ohio, 45177
- Coordinates: 39°26′25″N 83°49′07″W
- Operator: Wilmington College Athletic Department
- Capacity: 3,500
- Surface: Natural grass (1900–2008); Synthetic turf (2008–present)

Construction
- Built: 1900
- Renovated: 1994, 2008
- Expanded: 1983

Tenants
- Wilmington College Football (1900–present); Wilmington High School Football (2008–2014); Wilmington College Men’s Lacrosse (2013–present); Wilmington College Soccer (2014–present)

Williams Stadium, on the Campus of Wilmington College in Wilmington, Ohio, is a 3,500-seat multi-purpose football stadium that is home to the Wilmington College Quakers football, men's and women's soccer, and men's and women's lacrosse teams.

== History ==
Wilmington College football has been played at Townsend Field since 1900. Williams Stadium was constructed in 1983, which increased seating capacity to 3,500. Beckett Track and Field facility was added in 1994. In 2008, the Townsend Field playing field was resurfaced with synthetic turf and new lighting was installed, allowing for night games to be played at the College.
Along with the Wilmington College Quakers football team playing on Townsend field at Williams Stadium, Wilmington College's new Lacrosse teams began play on the field in the spring of 2013. Wilmington High School's football team has also played on the field since its re-surfacing in 2008.

=== WC Night Games ===
Wilmington began playing night games in the 2008 season, with a game against Marietta College, which the Quakers won 34-7. Wilmington has not won another home game at night since then.

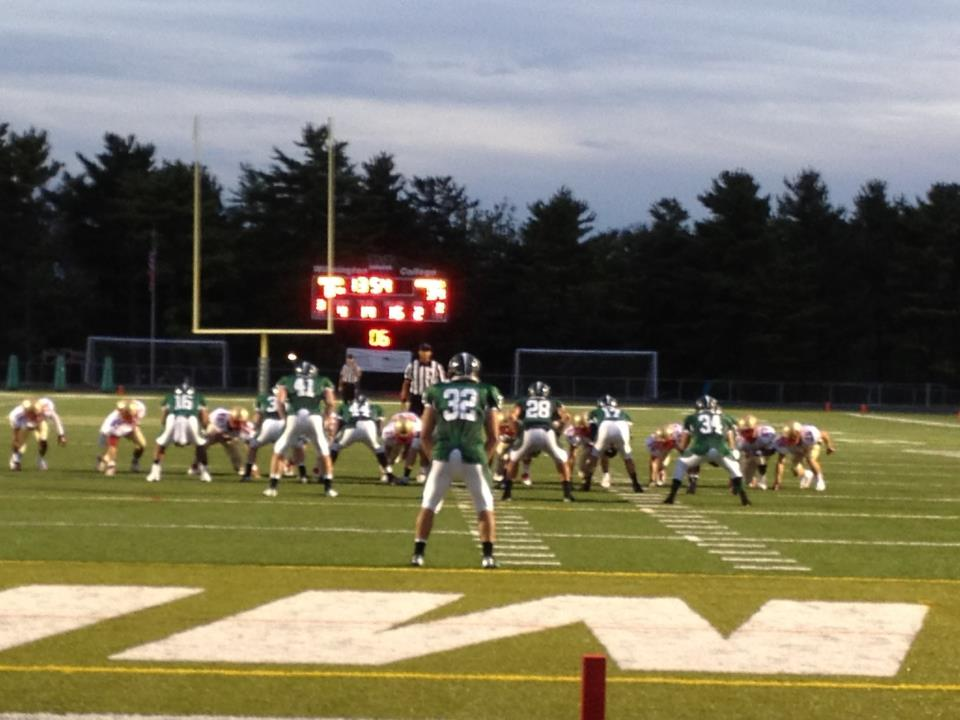
The Quakers take on the Otterbein Cardinals on September 15, 2012

Date	Result	Attendance
September 17, 2016	Otterbein 52, Wilmington 7	2,956
September 19, 2015	Capital 49, Wilmington 27	2,457
September 27, 2014	Otterbein 49, Wilmington 21	1,067
October 19, 2013	Baldwin Wallace 54, Wilmington 7	789
September 15, 2012	Otterbein 54, Wilmington 10	1,963
September 3, 2011	Mount St. Joseph 26, Wilmington 16	2,111
October 30, 2010	Heidelberg 36, Wilmington 3	891
September 18, 2010	Capital 10, Wilmington 7	2,011
September 26, 2009	Capital 37, Wilmington 21	2,011
September 5, 2009	Mount St. Joseph 27, Wilmington 18	3,087
September 20, 2008	Wilmington 34, Marietta 7	2,684

=== Stadium Milestones ===
- First Football game on turf: September 20, 2008: vs. Marietta College, W 34–7
- First Men's Lacrosse game: February 23, 2013: vs. DePauw University, W 8–6
- First Women's Lacrosse game: February 27, 2013: vs. Alma College, L 5–23
- First Men's Soccer game: August 30, 2014: vs. Franklin College, W 4–0
- First Women's Soccer game: September 3, 2014: vs. Wittenberg University, L 0–4
