= J. Brent Bill =

American author of Quaker literature

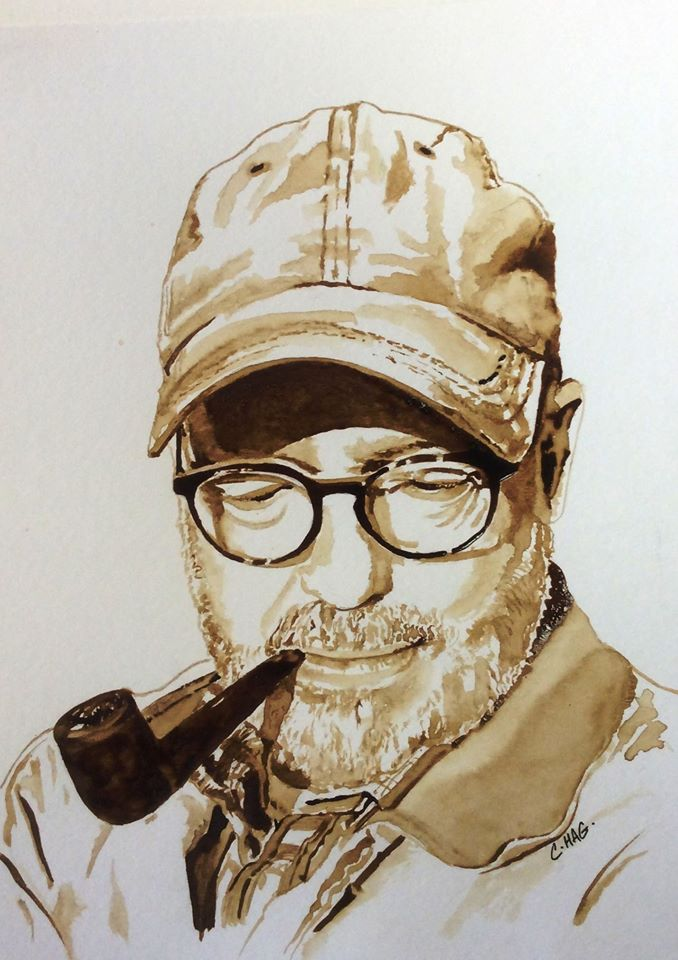
- Born: 1951 (age 73–74); Columbus, Ohio
- Education: Wilmington College and Earlham School of Religion
- Occupation: Author

J. Brent Bill (born 1951 in Columbus, Ohio) is an American author of Quaker spiritual literature. He is a graduate of Wilmington College and Earlham School of Religion and has worked as a pastor and writing coach.

== Works ==
- As editor. 2002. Imagination and Spirit: A Contemporary Quaker Reader ISBN 0-944350-61-5
- 2005. Holy Silence: The Gift of Quaker Spirituality ISBN 1-55725-420-6
  - Publishers Weekly described the book as a useful devotional guide and praised it for its "buoyant but realistic tone".
  - Spiritual Life praised the book for addressing a strongly felt need and described it as helpful to a wide readership. The reviewer noted, however, that the book left him unsatisfied and did not adequately explain the theological framework of the Quakers.
  - A second edition appeared in 2016: Holy Silence: The Gift of Quaker Spirituality, 2nd Edition ISBN 978-0-8028-7403-0
  - In a review of the second edition, the Presbyterian Outlook noted that "the Quakers are onto something" when it comes to silence.
  - The Catholic Library World recommended the book for readers open to that "still, small voice".
- 2006. Mind the Light: Learning to See with Spiritual Eyes ISBN 1-55725-489-3
  - Publishers Weekly described the book as useful but noted that "Bill's plethora of examples of spiritual sight sometimes overwhelm the point he wants to make".
- 2008. Sacred Compass: The Path of Spiritual Discernment ISBN 1-55725-559-8
- With Beth A. Booram. 2011. Awaken Your Senses: Exercises for Exploring the Wonder of God ISBN 978-0-8308-3560-7
  - In a starred review, Publishers Weekly called the work "a deeply pleasing book" which gracefully accomplishes its goals.
  - Friends Journal called it a "useful tool" though some of the images did not resonate with the reviewer.
- With Jennie Isbell. 2015. Finding God in the Verbs: Crafting a Fresh Language of God ISBN 978-0-8308-3596-6
  - Publishers Weekly described the book as practical and thought-provoking offering a "fresh, useful approach".
  - Friends Journal called it an "imperfect but powerful book" with a practical and humorous look at prayer.
- 2015. Life Lessons from a Bad Quaker: A Humble Stumble toward Simplicity and Grace ISBN 978-1-63088-131-3
  - Friends Journal described the book as accessible but also deep and praised the "sweet, serious prose with its simple advice about living in the Spirit." The book placed #5 on the list of "Top Ten Quaker Bestsellers 2018".
  - Western Friend recommended the book as a useful introduction to Quaker values for Christians of other denominations.
- 2019. Beauty, Truth Life, and Love: Four Essentials for the Abundant Life ISBN 978-1640602021
- 2019. Hope and Witness In Dangerous Times: Lessons from the Quakers on Blending Faith, Daily Life, and Activism ISBN 978-1789046199
  - Friends Journal says "His book not only shares some of the timeless wisdom Quakers have to offer, but it is timely as well." http://www.friendsjournal.org/book/hope-and-witness-in-dangerous-times-lessons-from-the-quakers-on-blending-faith-daily-life-and-activism
- 2023. Amity: Stories from the Heartland ISBN 978-1803413662
