= Association of Mideast Colleges =

American college football conference

The Association of Mideast Colleges was a short-lived NCAA Division III conference composed of member schools located in the Midwestern United States. The league existed from 1991 to 1996.

== Member schools ==
=== Final members ===
Institution	Location	Founded	Affiliation	Enrollment	Nickname	Joined (Note: Represents the calendar year when fall sports competition begins.)	Left (Note: Represents the calendar year when spring sports competition ends.)	Subsequent conference(s)	Current conference
Bluffton University	Bluffton, Ohio	1899	Mennonite	1,094	Beavers	1991	1996	D-III Independent (1996–98)	Heartland (HCAC) (1998–present)
Mount St. Joseph University	Delhi Township, Ohio	1920	Catholic (S.C.C.)	1,889	Lions	1995	1996	D-III Independent (1996–98)	Heartland (HCAC) (1998–present)
Thomas More University	Crestview Hills, Kentucky	1921	Catholic (Diocese of Covington/ Benedictines)	1,963	Saints	1991	1996	various (Note: Thomas More had joined the following subsequent conferences: as an NCAA D-III Independent from 1996–97 to 2004–05; the Presidents' Athletic Conference (PAC) from 2005–06 to 2017–18; the American Collegiate Athletic Association (ACAA) during the 2018–19 school year; and the Mid-South Conference (MSC) (Note: Currently an NAIA athletic conference.) from 2019–20 to 2022–23.)	Great Midwest (G-MAC) (Note: Currently an NCAA Division II athletic conference.) (2023–present)
Wilmington College	Wilmington, Ohio	1870	Quakers	990	Quakers	1991	1996	D-III Independent (1996–98); Heartland (HCAC) (1998–2000)	Ohio (OAC) (2000–present)

=== Former members ===
Institution	Location	Founded	Affiliation	Enrollment	Nickname	Joined (Note: Represents the calendar year when fall sports competition begins.)	Left (Note: Represents the calendar year when spring sports competition ends.)	Subsequent conference(s)	Current conference
Defiance College	Defiance, Ohio	1850	United Church of Christ	1,000	Yellow Jackets	1991	1995	various (Note: Defiance had joined the following subsequent conferences: as an NCAA D-III Independent from 1995–96 to 1996–97; the Michigan Intercollegiate Athletic Association (MIAA) from 1997–1998 to 1999–2000; and the Heartland Collegiate Athletic Conference (HCAC) from 2000–01 to 2023–24.)	Wolverine–Hoosier (WHAC) (2024–present) (Note: Currently an NAIA athletic conference.)

=== Membership timeline ===
Full member (all sports) Full member (non-football) Associate member (football) Associate member (sport)

== Football champions ==
- 1991 – Thomas More
- 1992 – Thomas More
- 1993 – Thomas More
- 1994 – Bluffton and Thomas More
- 1995 – Thomas More

== Yearly football standings ==
1991 Association of Mideast Colleges football standings
	Conf.					Overall
Team	W		L		T	W		L		T
Thomas More $	3	–	0	–	0	10	–	0	–	0
Defiance	2	–	1	–	0	8	–	2	–	0
Wilmington (OH)	1	–	2	–	0	1	–	9	–	0
Bluffton	0	–	3	–	0	1	–	8	–	0
$ – Conference champion

1992 Association of Mideast Colleges football standings
	Conf.					Overall
Team	W		L		T	W		L		T
Thomas More $^	3	–	0	–	0	9	–	2	–	0
Defiance	2	–	1	–	0	9	–	1	–	0
Bluffton	1	–	2	–	0	1	–	8	–	0
Wilmington (OH)	0	–	3	–	0	2	–	8	–	0
$ – Conference champion; ^ – NCAA Division III playoff participant

1993 Association of Mideast Colleges football standings
	Conf.					Overall
Team	W		L		T	W		L		T
Thomas More $	3	–	0	–	0	8	–	2	–	0
Defiance	2	–	1	–	0	9	–	1	–	0
Wilmington (OH)	1	–	2	–	0	6	–	4	–	0
Bluffton	0	–	3	–	0	3	–	7	–	0
$ – Conference champion

1994 Association of Mideast Colleges football standings
	Conf.					Overall
Team	W		L		T	W		L		T
Thomas More +	2	–	1	–	0	7	–	3	–	0
Bluffton +	2	–	1	–	0	4	–	5	–	0
Defiance	1	–	2	–	0	6	–	4	–	0
Wilmington (OH)	1	–	2	–	0	3	–	6	–	0
+ – Conference co-champions

1995 Association of Mideast Colleges football standings
	Conf.					Overall
Team	W		L		T	W		L		T
Thomas More $	3	–	0	–	0	10	–	0	–	0
Mount St. Joseph	1	–	2	–	0	5	–	4	–	0
Bluffton	1	–	2	–	0	5	–	5	–	0
Wilmington (OH)	1	–	2	–	0	2	–	6	–	1
$ – Conference champion

== See also ==
- List of defunct college football conferences
