= Stanley P. V. Arnold =

American newspaper editor and politician

Stanley P. V. Arnold (September 15, 1856 - February 1, 1901) was an American newspaper editor and politician.

Arnold was born on a farm in Jefferson County, Ohio. He went to the National Normal University in Lebanon, Ohio and taught school. He was involved with a trade paper in St. Louis, Missouri. In 1881, he became the editor and publisher of the Springfield Daily News in Springfield, Illinois. He was also involved with the printing, engraving, and publishing business. He lived in Springfield with his wife and family.

Arnold served in the Illinois House of Representatives in 1899 and 1900, and was a Democrat and a Populist.

Arnold died from complications from influenza in Springfield, Illinois.
