= James R. Keaton =

American lawyer (1861–1946)

- Born: December 10, 1861; Carter County, Kentucky
- Died: April 4, 1946 (aged 84); Oklahoma City, Oklahoma
- Education: National Normal University (BS) Georgetown University (LLB)
- Occupation: Attorney
- Known for: Justice of the Oklahoma Territorial Supreme Court

James R. Keaton (1861 – 1946) was a justice of the Territorial Oklahoma Supreme Court from 1896 to 1898.

== Early life ==
Keaton was born in Carter County, Kentucky on December 10, 1861, to Nelson F. (Fredrick) and Mary A. (Huff) Keaton. He started his education in the public schools, but later went to private schools in Grayson and Louisa, Kentucky. He got his higher education at National Normal School in Lebanon, Ohio, graduating with the Bachelor of Science degree in 1884. (Note: National Normal School was renamed Lebanon University in 1907, then went bankrupt and closed permanently in 1914.) He then attended Georgetown University, where he earned the Bachelor of Laws degree in June 1890. For the next four years, he taught school. He spent three years as a principal at Hico in Hamilton County, Texas and one year as principal at Duffau in Erath County, Texas. From 1886 to 1888, he was the editor and owner of the Hico Courier newspaper. He then read law in the office of Judge C.K. Bell of Hamilton. (Note: Judge Bell was later elected as Texas Attorney General and still later as a member of the U.S. House of Representatives from Fort Worth.)

== Oklahoma ==
Keaton was admitted to the bar in the District of Columbia in June 1890, admitted to practice law in Oklahoma Territory in September, 1890 and to appear in the U.S. Supreme Court in December 1898. He moved to Guthrie, Indian Territory in July, 1890, where he began practicing law on his own. He went into partnership with Judge John H. Cottrell in 1894, which lasted until Keaton was appointed to the Territorial Supreme Court in September, 1896. (Note: He was a delegate to the 1896 Democratic Party Convention in Chicago, which chose William Jennings Bryan as its nominee for President.) On September 19, President Grover Cleveland appointed him as Associate Justice to succeed Justice Scott. He was assigned to the Third Judicial District, which required him to move to Oklahoma City. On March 22, 1898, President William McKinley appointed a fellow Republican H. F. Burwell of Oklahoma City to succeed Judge Keaton. He left this position in May, 1898, to prepare a political campaign for the office of Representative to the U.S. Congress. He won the nomination by both the Democratic and Populist parties to oppose the Republican, Dennis T. Flynn. On March 22, 1898, President McKinley appointed H. F. Burwell of Oklahoma City to succeed Judge Keaton.

Judge Keaton's bid failed, so he turned to practicing law in Oklahoma City. In 1902, he joined the law firm of Shartel, Keaton & Wells. The firm was reorganized when Mr. Shartel retired in 1912, and renamed Keaton, Wells & Johnston. The firm seemed to have a number of prosperous corporate clients, especially in the mining business. Keaton became a stockholder and director of some.

An avid Democrat, though always willing to work with Republicans, he retained his interest in politics. He was a delegate from Oklahoma County to the first state Democratic Party Convention, where he was chairman of the Resolutions Committee. In 1909, he was the Oklahoma member of the General Council of the American Bar Association (ABA), remaining there until 1914. (Note: The General Council was, in effect, the steering committee for the ABA.) He was on the ABA committee that opposed a movement for judicial recall.

== Personal life ==
Keaton had married Mrs. Lucile Davenport Johnston in Denton, Texas on July 17, 1890. She was a native Texan, and the daughter of William Davenport, who had served the Confederate States of America as Consul to Mexico. The Keatons had one son, Clarence Johnston Keaton, before Lucile died on April 17, 1923.

Judge Keaton died of a heart ailment at the age of 84, on April 4, 1946, at Wesley Hospital in Oklahoma City. After a funeral service at the First Presbyterian Church of Oklahoma City, he was buried at Rose Hill Cemetery. An obituary characterized him as "...a stickler for legal ethics, a crusader for governmental reforms and economy in all branches of government." It noted that he was a leader in the fight to impeach Governor Walton, and that he refused to run for election as Corporation Commissioner in the Walton administration. (Note: Governor Jack C. Walton, elected January 1923, was impeached by the Oklahoma House of Representatives on October 23, 1923 and suspended from office, with Lieutenant Governor Martin Trapp becoming Acting Governor. Walton was convicted on November 23, 1923, and Trapp officially become Governor on that day.)
