= Zurich Renegades =

Swiss American football club

General information
- Founded: 1983
- Stadium: Sportplatz Looren, Witikon, Zurich
- Headquartered: Zurich, Switzerland
- Website: renegades.ch

Personnel
- Head coach: JJ Fayed

League / conference affiliations
- SAFV NLA

Championships
- League championships: 0; 7 Swiss Bowls

Current uniform

Home kit

The Zurich Renegades are an American football team from Zürich, Switzerland. The club, formed in 1983, is the oldest still existing American football club in Switzerland. With seven Swiss Bowl victories the Renegades have the second most after the Calanda Broncos. The Renegades play in the Nationalliga A (American football)

== History ==
Formed in November 1983, the club took part in the inaugural Swiss Bowl three years later, in 1986, where it lost to Lugano Seagulls. The two clubs met again in the 1987 Swiss Bowl and this time Zurich kept the upper hand and defended its title in 1988, now against the Bienna Jets. After this, the club briefly dropped out of the Nationalliga A, the highest league of American football in Switzerland. The club returned to the Nationalliga in 1990 but it took another decade for the Renegades to reach another Swiss Bowl.

From 2000 onwards the Renegades played in eight of the next ten Swiss Bowl, winning five of those and losing three. National titles were won in 2001 against the Basel Gladiators, in 2002 against the Seaside Vipers St. Gallen, in 2004 and 2005 against the Winterthur Warriors and in 2008 against the Calanda Broncos. The club's last appearance in the Swiss Bowl to date came in 2009 when it lost 23–35 to the Broncos. From 2010 to 2015 the club has played in the Nationalliga A without quite making it to the national championship game again. The 2016 season saw the club come last in the league without a win all season and lose the relegation play-off against Nationalliga B champions Geneva Seahawks as well.

Thereafter, the rebuild started. Two new mexican Coaches were acquired, Fabian Muñoz as head coach and offensive coordinator and Alonso Espinosa as defensive coordinator. In the first season in the NLB, the team managed to achieve only three victories out of 8 games played with the new coaching staff in the 2017 season. One year later, the mission to get back to NLA started and 9 regular season wins showed the potential of the team and led them to the relegation Game against the Luzern Lions. However, the Renegades were narrowly defeated by the team from Central Switzerland.

In 2019, the Zurich Renegades had a perfect season with 10 out of 10 regular season wins and were once again playing against the Luzern Lions in the relegation game for the right to be promoted back to the NLA. This time the team from Zurich was victorious, defeating Lucerne 38–27 in Utogrund Stadium in front of over 1000 visitors, paving the way to move back up to NLA the highest American Football league in Switzerland.

== Honours ==
- Swiss Bowl
  - Champions: (7) 1987, 1988, 2001, 2002, 2004, 2005, 2008
  - Runners-up: (5) 1986, 2000, 2006, 2009, 2024

== Recent seasons ==
Recent seasons of the club:

Season	League	Regular season							Postseason			
Season	League	Won	Lost	Ties	Win %	PF	PA	Finish	Won	Lost	Win %	Result
2008	NLA	7	1	0	.875	258	129	1st (League)	2	0	1.000	Swiss Bowl Champions 2008; SB: 52–27 against Landquart Broncos
2009	NLA	6	2	0	.750	243	146	2nd (League)	1	1	.500	SF: 51–46 against Winterthur Warriors; SB: 23–35 against Calanda Broncos
2010	NLA	2	8	0	.200	126	187	5th (League)	—			
2011	NLA	3	7	0	.300	221	303	5th (League)	—			
2012	NLA	7	2	0	.778	388	117	2nd (League)	0	1	.000	SF: 13–15 against Basel Gladiators
2013	NLA	2	8	0	.200	152	359	5th (League)	—			
2014	NLA	4	6	0	.400	273	405	4th (League)	0	1	.000	SF: 20–44 against Basel Gladiators
2015	NLA	4	6	0	.400	223	282	5th (League)	—			
2016	NLA	0	10	0	.000	128	311	6th (League)	0	1	.000	RR: 7–37 against Geneva Seahawks
2017	NLB	3	5	0	.375	182	185	4th (League)	—			
2018	NLB	9	1	0	.900	371	136	1st (League)	0	1	.000	PR: 15–17 against Luzern Lions
2019	NLB	10	0	0	1.000	327	107	1st (League)	1	0	1.000	PR: 38–27 against Luzern Lions
Total		57	56	0	.504				4	5	.444	

- SF = Semi Finals
- SB = Swiss Bowl
- PR = Promotion Round
- RR = Relegation Round
