= Swiss Bowl =

- First meeting: 1986
- Latest meeting: Stadion Obere Au, 12 July 2025

Statistics
- Total meetings: 39
- Most wins: Calanda Broncos (14)

The Swiss Bowl is the annual national championship game in the sport of American football in Switzerland, first held in 1986. It is contested by the two best teams of the Nationalliga A. The 2024 Swiss Bowl was won by the Calanda Broncos 35–14 over the Zurich Renegades.

The Calanda Broncos are the record winners of the Swiss Bowl, with thirteen successful participations. The Calanda Broncos hold the record for consecutive titles, five between 2009 and 2013.

The most-played Swiss Bowl game is Calanda Broncos versus Basel Gladiators, having been played six times, with Calanda winning the first five encounters of the two teams. The Basel Gladiators and the Geneva Seahawks are the most unsuccessful teams, having lost seven of their eight Swiss Bowl appearances.

== Swiss Bowls ==
The Swiss Bowls since 1986:.

=== By game ===
Bowl	Year	Date	Champions	Runners-Up	Score	Location	Attendance
I	1986	29 June 1986	Lugano Seagulls	Zurich Renegades	9–6		
II	1987	12 July 1987	Zurich Renegades	Lugano Seagulls	8–0		
III	1988	30 October 1988	Zurich Renegades	Bienna Jets	14–6		
IV	1989	10 September 1989	Bern Grizzlies	Basel Mean Machine	35–22		
V	1990	2 September 1990	St. Gallen Raiders	Bulach Giants	36–0		
VI	1991	29 September 1991	Geneva Seahawks	St. Gallen Raiders	20–13		
VII	1992	31 October 1992	St. Gallen Raiders	Basel Mean Machine	23–10		2,400
VIII	1993	10 October 1993	Basel Mean Machine	Zurich Falcons	36–2		
IX	1994	1 October 1994	Basel Mean Machine	Geneva Seahawks	29–6		
X	1995	23 September 1995	Bern Grizzlies	Geneva Seahawks	29–21		
XI	1996	13 July 1996	Bern Grizzlies	Geneva Seahawks	21–12		3,045
XII	1997	12 July 1997	Seaside Vipers St. Gallen	Bern Grizzlies	31–21		
XIII	1998	13 September 1998	Seaside Vipers St. Gallen	Landquart Broncos	14–13		
XIV	1999	4 July 1999	Seaside Vipers St. Gallen	Landquart Broncos	16–7		
XV	2000	24 September 2000	Seaside Vipers St. Gallen	Zurich Renegades	16–9		
XVI	2001	22 September 2001	Zurich Renegades	Basel Gladiators	27–14		
XVII	2002	6 October 2002	Zurich Renegades	Seaside Vipers St. Gallen	50–12		
XVIII	2003	28 September 2003	Landquart Broncos	Basel Gladiators	24–22		
XIX	2004	26 September 2004	Zurich Renegades	Winterthur Warriors	54–13		
XX	2005	16 July 2005	Zurich Renegades	Winterthur Warriors	37–14		
XXI	2006	15 July 2006	Winterthur Warriors	Zurich Renegades	21–13		
XXII	2007	14 July 2007	Bern Grizzlies	Winterthur Warriors	24–17		
XXIII	2008	5 July 2008	Zurich Renegades	Landquart Broncos	52–27	Bern	
XXIV	2009	25 July 2009	Calanda Broncos	Zurich Renegades	35–23	Bern	1,100
XXV	2010	24 July 2010	Calanda Broncos	Basel Gladiators	49–7		
XXVI	2011	16 July 2011	Calanda Broncos	Basel Gladiators	65–33	Winterthur	1,250
XXVII	2012	7 July 2012	Calanda Broncos	Basel Gladiators	56–14	Basel	750
XXVIII	2013	17 July 2013	Calanda Broncos	Basel Gladiators	46–41	Grenchen	1,200
XXIX	2014	12 July 2014	Basel Gladiators	Calanda Broncos	47–35	Bienne	
XXX	2015	11 July 2015	Calanda Broncos	Bern Grizzlies	49–21	Basel	1,500
XXXI	2016	9 July 2016	Bern Grizzlies	Calanda Broncos	42–35	Basel	960
XXXII	2017	8 July 2017	Calanda Broncos	Basel Gladiators	42–6	Chur	
XXXIII	2018	7 July 2018	Calanda Broncos	Geneva Seahawks	44–12	Bern	
XXXIV	2019	13 July 2019	Calanda Broncos	Geneva Seahawks	31–0	Chur	1,360
XXXV	2021	2 October 2021	Calanda Broncos	Bern Grizzlies	21–12	Basel	
XXXVI	2022	16 July 2022	Bern Grizzlies	Calanda Broncos	26–22	Grenchen	ca. 2,200
XXXVII	2023	15 July 2023	Calanda Broncos	Thun Tigers	53–21	Grenchen	1,390
XXXVIII	2024	13 July 2024	Calanda Broncos	Zurich Renegades	35–14	Grenchen	
XXXIX	2025	12 July 2025	Calanda Broncos	Basel Gladiators	41–28	Chur	
XL	2026	11 July 2026	Bern Grizzlies	Calanda Broncos	14–3		

- Champions in **bold**.

=== By team ===
App.	Team	Wins	Losses	Winning percentage	Season(s)^{†}
21	Calanda Broncos	14	7	0.700	1998, 1999, **2003**, 2008, **2009**, **2010**, **2011**, **2012**, **2013**, 2014, **2015**, 2016, **2017**, **2018**, **2019**, **2021**, 2022, **2023**, **2024**, **2025**, 2026
12	Zurich Renegades	7	5	0.583	1986, **1987**, **1988**, 2000, **2001**, **2002**, **2004**, **2005**, 2006, **2008**, 2009, 2024
10	Bern Grizzlies	7	3	0.667	**1989**, **1995**, **1996**, 1997, **2007**, 2015, **2016**, 2021, **2022**, **2026**
9	Basel Gladiators	1	8	0.111	2001, 2003, 2010, 2011, 2012, 2013, **2014**, 2017, 2025
8	Geneva Seahawks	1	7	0.125	1990, **1991**, 1993, 1994, 1995, 1996, 2018, 2019
5	Seaside Vipers St. Gallen	4	1	0.800	**1997**, **1998**, **1999**, **2000**, 2002
4	Basel Mean Machine	2	2	0.500	1989, **1990**, 1992, **1994**
4	Winterthur Warriors	1	3	0.250	2004, 2005, **2006**, 2007
2	St. Gallen Raiders	1	1	0.500	1991, **1992**
2	Lugano Seagulls	1	1	0.500	**1986**, 1987
1	Zürich Falcons	1	0	1.000	**1993**
1	Bienna Jets	0	1	0.000	1988
1	Thun Tigers	0	1	0.000	2023

- ^{†} **Bold** denotes Swiss Bowl victory.
