= Nationalliga A (American football) =

Sports league in Switzerland

- Current season, competition or edition: 2024 SAFV NLA
- Sport: American football
- No. of teams: 8
- Country: Switzerland
- Most recent champion: Bern Grizzlies (2026)
- Most titles: Calanda Broncos (13)
- Website: https://www.safv.ch

The Nationalliga A is the highest league level of American football in Switzerland and was formed in 1982. The first Swiss Bowl championship was played in 1986. Below the Nationalliga A sits the Nationalliga B, also made up of six teams. The champion of the B division has the opportunity to earn promotion to the top division through a relegation/promotion match. There is also a National League C.

The league season runs from late March to the end of June, followed by the play-offs and the Swiss Bowl which is held in July. The winners of the Swiss Bowl qualifies for the European Football League.

== 2025 teams ==
- Calanda Broncos
- Zurich Renegades
- Thun Tigers
- Winterthur Warriors
- Bern Grizzlies
- Geneva Seahawks
- Basel Gladiators
- St. Gallen Bears

== Recent seasons ==
Recent club by club final placings in the league:

Club	08	09	10	11	12	13	14	15	16	17	18	19	21	22	23	24	25	26
Bern Grizzlies	3	4	4	4	4	3	3	2	1	3	2	3	2	1	7	8	3	1
Calanda Broncos	2	1	1	1	1	1	2	1	2	1	1	1	1	2	1	1	1	2
Winterthur Warriors	4	3	6		5	4	5	4	4	4	4	5	4	6	6	7	4	3
Basel Gladiators	5		2	3	3	2	1	2	3	2	5	4	5	3	5	3	2	4
Geneva Seahawks		5								5	3	2	3	5	4	5	6	5
St. Gallen Bears																4	7	6
Thun Tigers														4	2	6	5	7
Zurich Renegades	1	2	5	5	2	5	4	5	6				6	7	3	2	8	8
Luzern Lions								6			6	6						
Lausanne LUCAF Owls							6		5	6								
Bienna Jets					6	6												
Hohenems Blue Devils			3	2														
Basel Meanmachine				6														

Champions	Runners up

== Notable: players and coaches ==
- Kevin Burke (quarterback)
- Chris Markey
- Dave Ritchie (Canadian football)
- Todd Hendricks
- Sasha Glavic
- Randy Hippeard
- Bill Ramseyer
- Adam Rita
- Tony Simmons (gridiron football)
- Larry Legault
- Hugh Mendez
