= Calanda Broncos =

American football team from Switzerland

- Founded: 1991
- League: Nationalliga A
- Team history: Landquart Broncos (1991–2008) Calanda Broncos (2009–present)
- Based in: Landquart, Switzerland
- Stadium: Ringstrasse Chur
- Colors: Red, Blue and White
- Championships: Eurobowl: 2012 EFAF Cup: 2010 Swiss Bowl: 2003, 2009–2013, 2015, 2017–2019, 2021, 2023–2025
- Website: www.calandabroncos.ch

The Calanda Broncos are an American football team from Landquart, Switzerland. The club, formed in 1991 as the Landquart Broncos, changed its name in late 2008 after the Calanda mountain to show the club's desire to represent a larger region of Graubünden rather than just the community of Landquart. With the move to the stadium in nearby Chur the club was also able to draw larger crowds for its home matches. The club is the best-supported American football club in Switzerland.

The club plays at the highest level of American football in Switzerland, the Nationalliga A, and has won the national championship game, the Swiss Bowl, on thirteen occasions, last in 2024.

== History ==
The club was formed as the Landquart Broncos in 1991. Originally, the club opted for the name Grison Broncos, Grison being the English name for Graubünden, but this was vetoed by the Swiss-American Football Association. After a slow start with 13 consecutive defeats, the Broncos won their first game in 1993, followed by promotion to the Nationalliga A, the highest level of American football in Switzerland.

The Broncos took another three seasons to make their first Swiss Bowl appearance, narrowly losing 14–13 to the Seaside Vipers St. Gallen in 1998. The team faced St. Gallen once more in the Swiss Bowl in 1999 but again lost, this time 16–7. The club came close to financial collapse after this, dropping down to the second tier but making a quick return to Nationalliga A by 2002.

The 2003 season saw the club narrowly reach the playoffs with a 5–4 regional season record. In the semi-finals of the play-offs the Broncos then defeated the defending champions Zurich Renegades 29–28, followed by a narrow 2-point Swiss Bowl victory over the Basel Gladiators. What followed was another drop to Nationalliga B after the 2005 season, caused mainly by the loss of quality players. The Broncos played at this level for two seasons before returning to the top level in 2008.

== Unbeaten streak begins ==
Back at Nationalliga A in 2008, the Broncos made another Swiss Bowl appearance, losing 52–27 to the Zurich Renegades. It was to be the club's last game as Landquard Broncos, being renamed Calanda Broncos shortly after. With the new name the Broncos became much more successful, becoming the first club in Switzerland to win five consecutive Swiss Bowls, from 2009 to 2013. In the 2009 Swiss Bowl, the Broncos defeated the Zurich Renegades 35–23 while the following four finals were won against the Basel Gladiators on each occasion. The 2013 final was the closest of those four encounters, with the Broncos winning 46–41. The dominance of the Broncos since 2009 manifests itself in the fact that the club has not lost a league or play-off game in Switzerland since 14 June 2009, when the Bern Grizzlies beat the Broncos 24–21 at Bern in the regular season. From that point, the Broncos went unbeaten in the Swiss league over the next four seasons.

== Eurobowl champions ==
Apart from national league success the club also became the first ever Swiss side to win the EFAF Cup in 2010, and the European championship Eurobowl, when the Broncos defeated favorite from the Austrian Football League, the Vienna Vikings 27–14 in the 2012 final.

In 2014, the club took part in a new European competition, the BIG6 European Football League, which consisted of three teams from Germany, two from Austria and one from Switzerland, the clubs being Berlin Adler, New Yorker Lions, Dresden Monarchs, Raiffeisen Vikings Vienna, Swarco Raiders Tirol and the Calanda Broncos. The two best teams of this competition advanced to the Eurobowl XXVIII.

== League unbeaten streak ends ==
Calandas unbeaten run in Switzerland, ended on 21 April 2014 when the team lost to the Bern Grizzlies. The Grizzlies were also the last team to beat the Broncos before the streak began in June 2009. The club finished second in the 2014 Swiss league regular season but lost the Swiss Bowl to the Basel Gladiators.

The Broncos embarked on a new philosophy in 2015, reducing its reliance on import foreign players and focusing more on building on local players. Most of the league predicted a steep fall, but the Broncos surprised everyone in 2015 going 11–1 and dominating the Bern Grizzlies in the Swiss Bowl, 49–21.

The 2016 season saw another very strong season, as the Broncos scheduled two international friendly games on top of the Swiss season. The Broncos travelled to Poland to take on the Wroclaw Panthers, losing 35–27. The Panthers went on to win the Polish championship and the IFAF-Europe Champions League. Calanda also hosted GFL-playoff team Allgäu Comets, losing a 24–14 game that was tied at halftime. The Broncos again posted a 9–1 regular season in the Swiss League and reached the Swiss Bowl for a rematch with the Bern Grizzlies. The Grizzlies forced a last-minute turnover and won 42–35.

== Return to dominance ==
2017 saw a return to dominance as the Broncos continued to watch adult rookie players and young players developed in the youth program fill in their roster. The Broncos opened the season with a pre-season game against the GFL's Stuttgart Scorpions, leading 20–3 at halftime en route to a 26–24 victory. From there, the Broncos posted their 3rd straight 9–1 regular season and reached another Swiss Bowl. This time, the Basel Gladiators were the opponent, but it was no contest as the Broncos steamrolled Basel to win the Swiss Bowl 42–6. This Swiss Bowl was special as it was played in the Broncos home stadium of Ringstrasse for the 1st time since 1999. The 2024 title marked the 13th Swiss Championship win in club history, most of any team in Switzerland.

== Notable players ==
- Adrian Suenderhauf
- Andre Mathes
- Conner Manning
- Jamal Clay
- John Uribe
- Lukas Lütscher
- Marco "Rex" Mahrer
- Max Gray
- DJ Wolfe
- Tissi Robinson
- Sasha Glavic
- Alex Raich

== Honours ==
- Eurobowl
  - Champions: 2012
- Central European Football League
  - Champions: 2026
- EFAF Cup:
  - Champions: 2010
- Swiss Bowl
  - Champions: (14) 2003, 2009–2013, 2015, 2017–2019, 2021, 2023–2025
  - Runners-up: (6) 1998, 1999, 2008, 2014, 2016, 2022, 2026
- Central European Football League CEFL Bowl
  - Runners-up: 2019, 2024, 2025

== Recent seasons ==
Recent seasons of the club:

Year	Division	Finish	Points	Pct.	Games	W	D	L	PF	PA	Postseason
2008	Nationalliga A	2nd	12–4	0.750	8	6	0	2	176	133	Lost SB: Zurich Renegades (27–52)
2009	Nationalliga A	1st	12–4	0.750	8	6	0	2	324	155	Won SF: Bern Grizzlies (42–0) Won SB: Zurich Renegades (35–23)
2010	Nationalliga A	1st	20–0	1.000	10	10	0	0	265	74	Won SF: Bern Grizzlies (30–7) Won SB: Basel Gladiators (49–7)
2011	Nationalliga A	1st	20–0	1.000	10	10	0	0	438	140	Won SF: Bern Grizzlies (43–6) Won SB: Basel Gladiators (65–33)
2012	Nationalliga A	1st	16–0	1.000	8	8	0	0	445	87	Won SF: Bern Grizzlies (50–0) Won SB: Basel Gladiators (56–14)
2013	Nationalliga A	1st	20–0	1.000	10	10	0	0	490	150	Won SF: Winterthur Warriors (54–7) Won SB: Basel Gladiators (46–41)
2014	Nationalliga A	2nd	16–4	0.800	10	8	0	2	394	211	Won SF: Bern Grizzlies (65–37) Lost SB: Basel Gladiators (35–47)
2015	Nationalliga A	1st	18–2	0.900	10	9	0	1	419	180	Won SF: Winterthur Warriors (45–6) Won SB: Bern Grizzlies (49–21)
2016	Nationalliga A	1st	18–2	0.900	10	9	0	1	442	262	Won SF: Winterthur Warriors (52–21) Lost SB: Bern Grizzlies (35–42)
2017	Nationalliga A	1st	18–2	0.900	10	9	0	1	376	168	Won SF: Winterthur Warriors (49–15) Won SB: Basel Gladiators (42–6)
2018	Nationalliga A	1st	20–0	1.000	10	10	0	0	423	105	Won SF: Winterthur Warriors (55–6) Won SB: Geneva Seahwaks (44–12)
2019	Nationalliga A	1st	18–2	0.900	10	9	0	1	349	153	Won SF: Basel Gladiators (32–20) Won SB: Geneva Seahawks (31–0)
2020	Nationalliga A	1st	8–0	1.000	4	4	0	0	128	16	Won SF: Thun Tigers (34–10) Won SB: Winterthur Warriors (21–6)
2021	Nationalliga A	1st	14–2	0.875	8	7	0	1	299	106	Won SF: Winterthur Warriors (35–8) Won SB: Bern Grizzlies (21–12)
2022	Nationalliga A	2nd	16–4	0.800	10	8	0	2	309	166	Won SF: Basel Gladiators (38–14) Lost SB: Bern Grizzlies (22–26)
2023	Nationalliga A	1st	18–2	0.800	10	9	0	1	373	193	Won SF: Geneva Seahawks (35–3) Won SB: Thun Tigers (53–21)
2024	Nationalliga A	1st	20–0	1.000	10	10	0	0	321	154	Won SF: St. Gallen Bears (54–14) Won SB: Zurich Renegades (35–13)
2025	Nationalliga A	1st	20–0	1.000	10	10	0	0	461	123	Won SF: Thun Tigers (32–7) Won SB: Basel Gladiators (41–28)
2026	Nationalliga A	2nd	16–4	0.800	10	8	0	2	403	211	Won SF: Winterthur Warriors (35–14) Lost SB: Bern Grizzlies (3–14)

- SF = Semi finals.
- SB = Swiss Bowl.
