= 2008 Toronto Argonauts season =

CFL team season

- General manager: Adam Rita
- Head coach: Rich Stubler (to Sept. 9); Don Matthews (Sept. 9 to Oct. 31)
- Home stadium: Rogers Centre

Results
- Record: 4–14
- Division place: 3rd, East
- Playoffs: did not qualify

Uniform

The 2008 Toronto Argonauts season was the 51st season for the team in the Canadian Football League (CFL) and 136th season overall. The Argonauts attempted to win their 16th Grey Cup, but they failed to make the playoffs ending the season on a nine-game losing streak.

== Offseason ==
=== CFL draft ===
In the 2008 CFL draft, 48 players were chosen from among 752 eligible players from Canadian universities across the country, as well as Canadian players playing in the NCAA. The first two rounds were broadcast on TSN.ca with host Rod Black.

Round	Pick	Player	Position	School/Club team
2	13	Mike Bradwell	WR	McMaster
3	21	Jean-Nicolas Carriere	LB	McGill
4	29	Delroy Clarke	DB	Ottawa
5	37	Richard Zulys	OL	Western Ontario
6	42 (via Edmonton)	Mark Dewit	OL	Calgary
6	44 (via Montreal)	Tyler Scott	REC	Western Ontario
6	45	Matt Black	DB	Saginaw Valley

=== Notable transactions ===
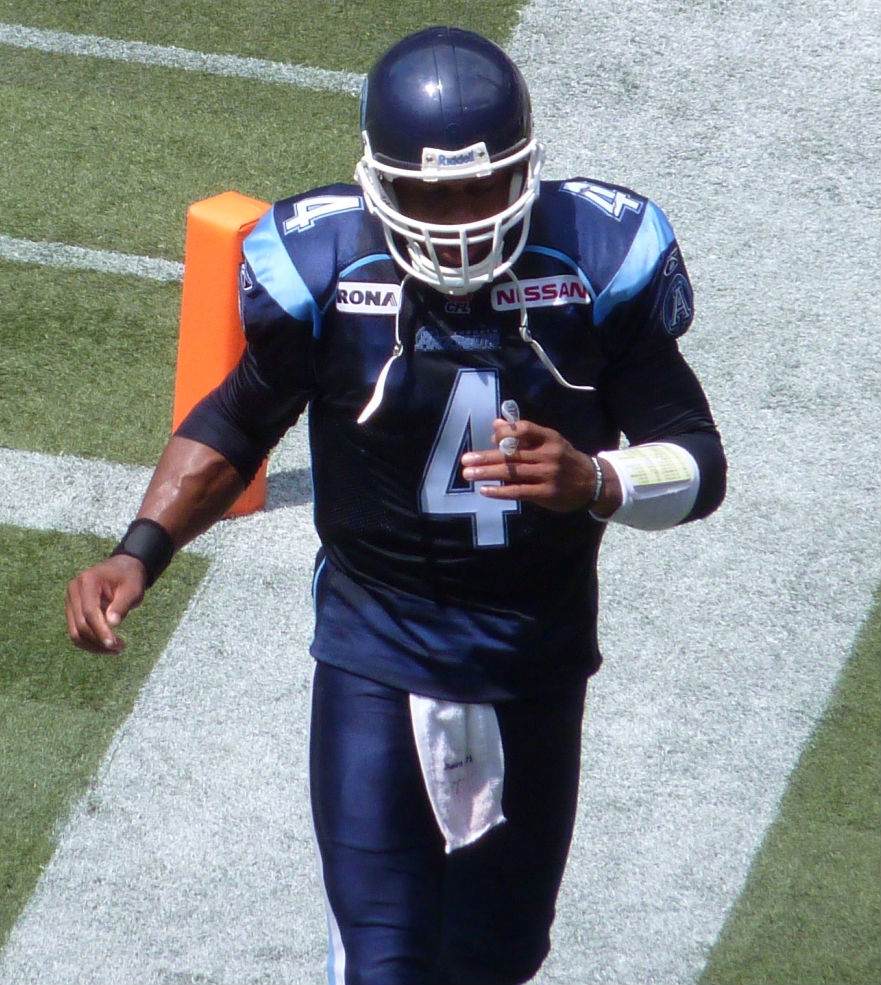
Quarterback Kerry Joseph jogs offs the Rogers Centre field

Date	Type	Incoming	Outgoing	Team
March 5, 2008	Trade	Kerry Joseph, Quarterback; Riders third round pick in the 2010 CFL Draft	Glenn January, Offensive Tackle; Ronald Flemons, Defensive Lineman; Argonauts first round selection in the 2008 CFL Draft; Argonauts second round selection in the 2010 CFL Draft	Saskatchewan Roughriders

- The Toronto Argonauts signed former National Football League receiver/kick-returner Bethel Johnson on May 26. Johnson is a two-time Super Bowl champion, who posted a league-best 28.2-yard kickoff return average as a rookie in 2003 with the New England Patriots. Johnson signed with the Argos on Monday, May 26.
- Damon Allen, 44, announced his retirement from the CFL on May 28. Allen had maintained during the offseason that he intended to attend training camp and compete for the starter's job. Allen would have gone into camp third on the depth chart behind newly acquired Kerry Joseph and veteran Michael Bishop, both of whom signed new deals with the Argos in the off-season.

Allen retires as pro football's career passing leader with 72,381 yards. He played on four Grey Cup-winning teams and in 2005, he captured the league's outstanding player award.

- June 5, 2008: The Argos acquired running back Jamal Robertson from the Saskatchewan Roughriders for Canadian cornerback Leron Mitchell. He was a former University of Western Ontario Mustangs star who this off-season had a workout with the NFL's Dallas Cowboys.

== Rosters ==
=== Preseason roster ===
As of June 10, 2008

2008 Toronto Argonauts preseason roster
Quarterbacks: 4 Kerry Joseph; 12 Reggie McNeal; 14 Cody Pickett; 17 Michael Bishop; Running backs: 44 Andre Durie; 24 Tyler Ebell; 25 Jamal Robertson; 33 Jeff Johnson; 34 Dominique Dorsey RB/KR; 40 Bryan Crawford; 42 Dashawn Thomas; Receivers: 5 Arland Bruce III SB; 9 Andre Talbot WR; 15 Tyler Scott WR; 16 Obed Cétoute WR; 19 James Robinson WR; 47 Steve Schmidt R/TE; 80 Chris Cole WR; 81 David Gray TE; 82 TJ Acree SB; 83 Bethel Johnson WR; 84 Patrick Johnson SB; 85 Chad Rempel SB; 86 Nathan Hoffart SB; 88 Mike Bradwell WR	Offensive linemen: 53 Mark Dewit; 56 Chad Folk C; 57 Brian Ramsay OT; 58 Scott Evans OG; 59 Jerome Davis OT; 61 Ross Weaver OT; 62 Ben Brielmaier OT; 65 Taylor Robertson OG; 66 Jude St. John OG; 67 Nikolas Sobic OT; Defensive linemen: 7 Riall Johnson DE; 78 Adriano Belli DT; 90 Adrian Davis DT; 93 Jean-Nicolas Carrière DL/LB; 94 Seante Williams DE; 97 Jonathan Brown DE	Linebackers: 2 Michael Fletcher ILB; 6 Yves Hercule ILB; 10 Willie Pile OLB; 35 Kevin Eiben OLB; 38 Andre Maddox OLB; 43 Adrian Mayes OLB; 50 Mike O'Shea ILB; 51 Raymond Fontaine OLB; 52 Aaron Wagner ILB; 54 Eric Maranda ILB; 95 Richard Seigler ILB; Defensive backs: 3 Khalil Carter DB; 8 Chris Hardy S; 18 DeJuan Groce CB; 21 Orlondo Steinauer S; 23 Willie Middlebrooks DB; 24 Tra Boger DB; 26 Dyshod Carter CB; 28 Byron Parker CB; 29 Wayne Shaw S; 30 Kenny Wheaton DB; 32 Chuck Winters DB; 37 Antonio Perkins CB; 39 Delroy Clarke DB; 46 Kenny Heatly CB; Special teams: 70 Robert Eeuwes K/P; 45 Randy Srochenski LS/LB; 13 Mike Vanderjagt K/P	Injured Reserve Suspended list: 64 Richard Zulys OL; 73 Michael Quarshie DT; 89 David Boston WR; Practice Roster Italics indicates Import player Roster updated 2008-06-10; Depth Chart • Transactions; 69 Active, 3 Inactive

=== End of season roster ===
2008 Toronto Argonauts final roster
Quarterbacks: 4 Kerry Joseph; 3 Cody Pickett; Running backs: 40 Bryan Crawford; 26 Andre Durie; 33 Jeff Johnson; 25 Jamal Robertson; Receivers: 5 Arland Bruce; 86 Nathan Hoffart; 12 Reggie McNeal; 19 James Robinson; 14 P. K. Sam; 81 Steve Schmidt; 17 Keith Stokes; 9 Andre Talbot	Offensive linemen: 59 Jerome Davis T; 53 Mark Dewit G/C; 56 Chad Folk C; 68 Andrew Greene G; 57 Brian Ramsay T; 65 Taylor Robertson G; 66 Jude St. John G; Defensive linemen: 78 Adriano Belli DT; 97 Jonathan Brown DE; 98 Walter Curry DT; 92 Claude Harriott DT; 7 Riall Johnson DE; 95 Richard Seigler DE	Linebackers: 51 Raymond Fontaine; 43 Adrian Mayes; 50 Mike O'Shea; 10 Willie Pile; 52 Aaron Wagner; Defensive backs: 11 Delroy Clarke; 8 Chris Hardy; 29 Pete Hunter; 42 Jermaine Mays; 23 Willie Middlebrooks; 28 Byron Parker; 20 Will Poole; 6 Jason Shivers	Special teams: 13 Mike Vanderjagt K/P; 45 Randy Srochenski LS; Reserve roster: 99 Ronald Flemons DT; 15 Tyler Scott WR; 67 Cliff Washburn T; 30 Kenny Wheaton DB; Practice roster: 90 Adrian Davis DT; 38 Ryan Glasper [DB; 80 Brad Smith WR; 42 Da'shawn Thomas RB; 54 Chris Van Zeyl T	Injured list: 47 Jean-Nicolas Carrière LB; 16 Obed Cétoute WR; 34 Dominique Dorsey RB; 24 Tyler Ebell RB; 35 Kevin Eiben LB; 2 Michael Fletcher LB; 27 Kenny Heatly DB; 32 Chuck Winters DB; 69 Jonta Woodard T; Italics indicates American player Roster updated 2026-04-24

== Schedule ==
=== Preseason ===
Week	Date	Opponent	Location	Final score	Attendance	Record
A	June 12	@ Alouettes	Molson Stadium	T 34 – 34	20,202	0–0–1
B	June 19	Tiger-Cats	Rogers Centre	L 28 – 21	21,422	0–1–1

=== Regular season ===
Week	Date	Opponent	Location	Final score	Attendance	Record
1	June 27	@ Blue Bombers	Canad Inns Stadium	W 23 – 16	26,155	1–0
2	July 3	Tiger-Cats	Rogers Centre	L 32 – 13	30,822	1–1
3	July 10	@ Eskimos	Commonwealth Stadium	L 47 – 28	31,707	1–2
4	July 20	Eskimos	Rogers Centre	W 35 – 31	28,522	2–2
5	July 27	@ Roughriders	Mosaic Stadium	L 28 – 22	28,800	2–3
6	August 1	Blue Bombers	Rogers Centre	W 19 – 11	28,523	3–3
7	August 7	@ Tiger-Cats	Ivor Wynne Stadium	L 45 – 21	19,423	3–4
8	August 15	Alouettes	Rogers Centre	L 32 – 14	30,521	3–5
9	Bye					
10	September 1	@ Tiger-Cats	Ivor Wynne Stadium	W 34 – 31	25,911	4–5
11	September 7	@ Alouettes	Molson Stadium	L 45 – 19	20,202	4–6
12	September 12	Blue Bombers	Rogers Centre	L 39 – 9	28,453	4–7
13	September 20	@ Stampeders	McMahon Stadium	L 34 – 4	33,135	4–8
14	September 27	Stampeders	Rogers Centre	L 44 – 16	28,672	4–9
15	October 3	Lions	Rogers Centre	L 24 – 20	28,273	4–10
16	October 10	@ Blue Bombers	Canad Inns Stadium	L 25 – 16	27,268	4–11
17	October 18	Alouettes	Rogers Centre	L 43 – 34	30,262	4–12
18	October 25	@ Lions	BC Place Stadium	L 55 – 32	35,994	4–13
19	October 30	Roughriders	Rogers Centre	L 45 – 38	28,654	4–14

== Regular season ==
Toronto started the season off well, winning against the Blue Bombers 23–16, but after that they compiled a 2–5 record the next 7 games. After the Bye week, everything went downhill, they won only one game and lost 9 start to finish the season 4–14 and missed the playoffs.

A raucous Labour Day crowd of 25,911 at Ivor Wynne Stadium witnessed a game that ended with a 34–31 Argo victory, the team's first win against the Hamilton Tiger-Cats of the season. Argo head coach Rich Stubler's job was rumoured to be on the line. Argos receiver Arland Bruce III found time for a little theatrics, celebrating an 11-yard TD catch by donning a Spider-Man mask produced from his pants. Several days later, the Canadian Football League fined the Argonauts receiver an undisclosed amount for his touchdown celebration. Game officials had handed Bruce an objectionable conduct penalty after the incident. Bruce went on to have his best game of the season, catching 10 passes for a game-high 149 yards.

On September 9, Stubler was released as head coach of the Argonauts after posting a 4–6 record. There was the belief he could not get along with those he worked with. The Argos hired Don Matthews, the head coach with the most wins in CFL history and head coach during Toronto's back-to-back Grey Cup victories in 1996 and 1997, to return to the club as head coach for the third time in his coaching career.

During the team's next game on September 12 at Rogers Centre, Winnipeg Blue Bombers slotback Milt Stegall became the most prolific receiver in the history of the CFL. The slotback caught a 92-yard pass at 9:02 in the second quarter to raise his career total to 14,983, breaking the mark of 14,891 yards previously held by former Stampeders receiver Allen Pitts. Stegall took a pass from Kevin Glenn and scored a touchdown, his second of the game. It put the Bombers ahead 28–3.

On October 31, Matthews resigned from the Argonauts a day after the conclusion of the Argonauts 2008 regular season, which saw the Argos fail to win a game in the eight games under his leadership and finishing out of the playoffs for the first time since the 2001 CFL season.

=== Season standings ===
East Division
Pos	Team	Pld	W	L	T	PF	PA	PD	Pts
1	Montreal Alouettes (C, Q)	18	11	7	0	610	443	+167	22
2	Winnipeg Blue Bombers (Q)	18	8	10	0	435	490	−55	16
3	Toronto Argonauts	18	4	14	0	397	627	−230	8
4	Hamilton Tiger-Cats	18	3	15	0	441	593	−152	6

Source: "2008 Regular Season Standings". Canadian Football League. Archived from the original on 2009-02-05.
(C) First round bye; (Q) Qualified for playoffs

== Statistics ==
=== Offence ===
==== Passing ====
Player	Att	Comp	%	Yards	TD	INT	Rating
Kerry Joseph	536	307	57.3	4174	17	14	82.0
Cody Pickett	104	63	60.6	610	1	2	72.2
Reggie McNeal	2	0	0.0	0	0	0	2.1

==== Rushing ====
Player	Att	Yards	Avg,	TD	Fumbles
Jamal Robertson	117	645	5.5	6	2
Kerry Joseph	78	493	6.3	4	7
Dominique Dorsey	64	41 0	6.4	2	2
Jeff Johnson	8	31	3.9	1	0

==== Receiving ====
Player	Receptions	Yards	Touchdowns
Arland Bruce	92	1210	9
Andre Talbot	76	915	4
Reggie McNeal	43	606	2
P. K. Sam	36	499	3
James Robinson	25	381	1
Tyler Scott	19	309	0
Dominique Dorsey	15	286	0

== Postseason ==
The Argos finished third in the East Division with a record of 4 wins and 14 losses. The Edmonton Eskimos, who finished fourth in the West, had a better record of 10 and 8, and under the cross-over rule eliminated Toronto from the playoffs and play the Winnipeg Blue Bombers in the East semi-final.

== Awards and records ==
- Arland Bruce, Eastern Division All-Star, Offence
- Jonathan Brown, CFL Eastern All-Star, Defence
- Dominique Dorsey, CFL Eastern All-Star, Special Teams
- John Agro Special Teams Award – Dominique Dorsey (RB), Toronto Argonauts
- Kenny Wheaton, CFL Eastern All-Star, Defence
