= 2007 Toronto Argonauts season =

CFL team season

- General manager: Adam Rita
- Head coach: Michael Clemons
- Home stadium: Rogers Centre

Results
- Record: 11–7
- Division place: 1st, East
- Playoffs: Lost East Final

Uniform

The 2007 Toronto Argonauts season was the 50th season for the team in the Canadian Football League (CFL) and 135th season overall. The Argonauts finished the regular season 11–7 and finished in first place in the East Division.

== Offseason ==
=== CFL draft ===
Pick #	CFL team	Player	Position	College
29	Toronto Argonauts	Eric Maranda	LB	Laval
30	Toronto Argonauts (Via Calgary)	Steve Schmidt	TE	San Diego State
37	Toronto Argonauts	Sean Simms	DL	York
45	Toronto Argonauts	Brad Smith	WR	Queen's

== Preseason ==
Week	Date	Opponent	Location	Final score	Attendance	Record
A	June 9	Alouettes	Rogers Centre	W 27 – 13	18,156	1–0
C	June 21	@ Alouettes	Molson Stadium	L 34 – 26	20,202	1–1

== Regular season ==
The team began with a disappointing 2-6 start to the season. With playoff hopes in jeopardy following a last second loss to the Blue Bombers on August 24, the team turned things around with two big wins against their rivals from Hamilton. Pinball led the group to a 9-1 finish and a sixth straight playoff appearance.

=== Season standings ===
East Division
Team	GP	W	L	T	PF	PA	Pts	
Toronto Argonauts	18	11	7	0	440	336	22	Details
Winnipeg Blue Bombers	18	10	7	1	439	404	21	Details
Montreal Alouettes	18	8	10	0	398	433	16	Details
Hamilton Tiger-Cats	18	3	15	0	315	514	6	Details

=== Season schedule ===
Week	Date	Opponent	Location	Final score	Attendance	Record
1	June 28	Lions	Rogers Centre	L 24 – 22	29,157	0–1
2	July 7	@ Tiger-Cats	Ivor Wynne Stadium	W 30 – 5	28,198	1–1
3	July 12	Stampeders	Rogers Centre	W 48 – 15	29,304	2–1
4	July 21	@ Stampeders	McMahon Stadium	L 33 – 10	28,202	2–2
5	July 26	Alouettes	Rogers Centre	L 26 – 13	31,097	2–3
6	August 2	@ Alouettes	Molson Stadium	L 29 – 27 (OT)	20,202	2–4
7	August 10	Roughriders	Rogers Centre	L 24 – 13	34,234	2–5
8	Bye					
9	August 24	@ Blue Bombers	Canad Inns Stadium	L 15 – 13	29,533	2–6
10	September 3	@ Tiger-Cats	Ivor Wynne Stadium	W 32 – 14	28,644	3–6
11	September 8	Tiger-Cats	Rogers Centre	W 35 – 22	28,279	4–6
12	September 15	@ Lions	BC Place Stadium	L 40 – 7	31,156	4–7
13	September 23	Blue Bombers	Rogers Centre	W 31 – 23	26,423	5–7
14	September 28	@ Eskimos	Commonwealth Stadium	W 18 – 11	31,056	6–7
15	October 6	Eskimos	Rogers Centre	W 33 – 8	28,354	7–7
16	October 12	Alouettes	Rogers Centre	W 35 – 17	31,416	8–7
17	October 20	@ Alouettes	Olympic Stadium	W 16 – 9	44,510	9–7
18	October 27	Blue Bombers	Rogers Centre	W 16 – 8	40,116	10–7
19	November 3	@ Roughriders	Mosaic Stadium	W 41 – 13	28,800	11–7

== Postseason ==
Round	Date	Opponent	Location	Final score	Attendance
East Final	November 18	Blue Bombers	Rogers Centre	L 19–9	33,467

Team	Q1	Q2	Q3	Q4	Total
Winnipeg Blue Bombers	7	5	7	0	19
Toronto Argonauts	1	0	0	8	9

The Winnipeg Blue Bombers advanced to the Grey Cup for the first time in six years by stunning the Toronto Argonauts on Sunday but lost star quarterback, Kevin Glenn in the process.

== Roster ==
2007 Toronto Argonauts final roster
Quarterbacks: 9 Damon Allen; 17 Michael Bishop; 19 Ian Butler; Running backs: 20 John Avery; 40 Bryan Crawford; 34 Dominique Dorsey; 47 Robert Edwards; 33 Jeff Keeping; 11 John Williams; Receivers: 5 Arland Bruce; 16 Obed Cétoute; 15 Tony Miles; 85 Chad Rempel; 4 Andre Talbot	Offensive linemen: 65 Jerome Davis T; 56 Chad Folk C; 64 Glenn January T; 57 Brian Ramsay T; 65 Taylor Robertson G; 66 Jude St. John G; Defensive linemen: 78 Adriano Belli DT; 97 Jonathan Brown DE; 99 Ronald Flemons DE/DT; 98 Riall Johnson DE; Special teams: 1 Noel Prefontaine K/P; 45 Randy Srochenski LS	Linebackers: 35 Kevin Eiben; 2 Michael Fletcher; 51 Raymond Fontaine; 43 Adrian Mayes; 50 Mike O'Shea; 10 Willie Pile; Defensive backs: 3 Kahlil Carter; 8 Chris Hardy K/P; 6 Yves Hercule; 25 Leron Mitchell; 28 Byron Parker; 29 Wayne Shaw; 21 Orlondo Steinauer; 30 Kenny Wheaton; 32 Chuck Winters; 26 Jordan Younger	Reserve roster: 13 Andre Durie RB; 87 Derrell Mitchell SB; 63 Steve Morley T; 88 Frank Murphy WR; Injured list: 36 Kojo Aidoo FB; 89 Marc Boerigter WR; 23 Troy Davis RB; 33 Jeff Johnson RB; 84 Patrick Johnson WR; 69 Mike Pearson T; 14 Cody Pickett QB; 52 Aaron Wagner LB; Italics indicate International player

== Awards and records ==
- Jonathan Brown, DE, James P. McCaffrey Trophy

=== CFL Eastern All-Stars: OFFENCE ===
- OG – Taylor Robertson, Toronto Argonauts

=== CFL Eastern All-Stars: DEFENCE ===
- DE – Jonathan Brown, Toronto Argonauts
- LB – Kevin Eiben, Toronto Argonauts
- DB – Kenny Wheaton, Toronto Argonauts
- CB – Byron Parker, Toronto Argonauts
- CB – Jordan Younger, Toronto Argonauts
- DS – Orlondo Steinauer, Toronto Argonauts
