= 2006 Toronto Argonauts season =

CFL team season

- Head coach: Michael Clemons
- Home stadium: Rogers Centre

Results
- Record: 10–8
- Division place: 2nd, East
- Playoffs: Lost East Final

Uniform

The 2006 Toronto Argonauts season was the 49th season for the team in the Canadian Football League (CFL) and 134th season overall. The Argonauts finished the regular season 10–8 and finished in second place in the East Division.

== Offseason ==
The Argos recruited Ricky Williams as a running back (RB), and the 2001 Heisman Trophy winner, Eric Crouch, as a quarterback (QB).

=== CFL draft ===
Pick #	CFL team	Player	Position	College
5	Toronto Argonauts	Daniel Federkeil	DL	Calgary
10	Toronto Argonauts	Leron Mitchell	DB	Western Ontario
14	Toronto Argonauts	Aaron Wagner	LB	Brigham Young
31	Toronto Argonauts	Obed Cetoute	WR	Central Florida
39	Toronto Argonauts	Brian Ramsay	OL	New Mexico
47	Toronto Argonauts	Clifton Dawson	RB	Harvard

== Preseason ==
Week	Date	Opponent	Location	Final score	Attendance	Record
A	June 2	Tiger-Cats	Rogers Centre	L 31 – 3	21,469	0–1
B	June 9	@ Tiger-Cats	Ivor Wynne Stadium	L 21 – 11	25,398	0–2

== Regular season ==
Quarterback Damon Allen became professional football's all-time leading passer, overtaking Warren Moon on Labour Day in Hamilton. The team, however, was decimated by injuries at almost every position and the Argonauts stumbled out of the gate to a 2–5 record. Mid-season health bred new promise as the team gained the majority of its starters back including Allen and Williams, who both fell to injury early in the year. Upon his return, Williams joined forces with fellow RB John Avery to deliver a late-season one-two punch out of the backfield. Combined with the stellar play of their dominant defence, the Double Blue was able to turn the season around and win 8 of their remaining 11 regular season games to finish in a first-place tie with the Montreal Alouettes. The CFL tie-break rule landed the Argos in second place.

=== Season schedule ===
Week	Date	Opponent	Location	Final score	Attendance	Record
1	June 17	Tiger-Cats	Rogers Centre	W 27 – 17	27,689	1–0
2	June 23	@ Blue Bombers	Canad Inns Stadium	L 16 – 9	26,524	1–1
3	June 30	@ Lions	BC Place Stadium	L 26 – 19	30,514	1–2
4	July 8	Blue Bombers	Rogers Centre	L 24 – 17	26,304	1–3
5	Bye					
6	July 22	@ Roughriders	Mosaic Stadium	W 26 – 23	24,967	2–3
7	July 29	Lions	Rogers Centre	L 28 – 8	28,356	2–4
8	August 3	@ Alouettes	Molson Stadium	L 31 – 7	20,202	2–5
9	August 12	@ Tiger-Cats	Ivor Wynne Stadium	W 20 – 2	29,010	3–5
10	August 19	Alouettes	Rogers Centre	W 31 – 6	30,786	4–5
11	August 25	@ Blue Bombers	Canad Inns Stadium	W 18 – 15	25,014	5–5
12	September 4	@ Tiger-Cats	Ivor Wynne Stadium	W 40 – 6	28,891	6–5
13	September 9	Tiger-Cats	Rogers Centre	W 11 – 9	26,212	7–5
14	Bye					
15	September 23	@ Stampeders	McMahon Stadium	L 39 – 18	31,539	7–6
16	September 30	Stampeders	Rogers Centre	W 23 – 16	32,410	8–6
17	October 9	Eskimos	Rogers Centre	W 28 – 23	26,891	9–6
18	October 14	@ Eskimos	Commonwealth Stadium	W 28 – 25	39,533	10–6
19	October 20	Roughriders	Rogers Centre	L 13 – 9	30,323	10–7
20	October 28	Alouettes	Rogers Centre	L 24 – 20	38,123	10–8

=== Season standings ===
East Division
Pos	Team	Pld	W	L	T	PF	PA	PD	Pts
1	Montreal Alouettes (C, Q)	18	10	8	0	451	431	+20	20
2	Toronto Argonauts (Q)	18	10	8	0	359	343	+16	20
3	Winnipeg Blue Bombers (Q)	18	9	9	0	362	408	−46	18
4	Hamilton Tiger-Cats	18	4	14	0	292	495	−203	8

Source: "2006 Regular Season Standings". Canadian Football League. Archived from the original on 2008-09-21.
(C) First round bye; (Q) Qualified for playoffs

== Postseason ==
The Argos hosted the Winnipeg Blue Bombers in an East Semi-Final at Rogers Centre. With the season on the line, QB Michael Bishop and LB Chuck Winters teamed up to lead the Boatmen to a come-from-behind victory. The Argos fell to Montreal in the East Championship.

Round	Date	Opponent	Location	Final score	Attendance
East Semi-Final	November 5	Blue Bombers	Rogers Centre	W 31–27	26,214
East Final	November 12	@ Alouettes	Olympic Stadium	L 33–24	35,607

== Roster ==
2006 Toronto Argonauts final roster
Quarterbacks: 9 Damon Allen; 17 Michael Bishop; 19 Spergon Wynn; Running backs: 20 John Avery; 40 Bryan Crawford; 36 Jason Gavadza; 27 Ricky Williams; Receivers: 5 Arland Bruce; 23 Bashir Levingston; 77 Michael Palmer; 85 Chad Rempel; 18 R. Jay Soward; 6 Keith Stokes; 4 Andre Talbot	Offensive linemen: 68 Dave Costa T/G; 56 Chad Folk C; 62 Jonathan Landon T; 66 Jude St. John G; 69 Bernard Williams T; 58 Jeff Yorga G; Defensive linemen: 97 Jonathan Brown DE; 92 Noah Cantor NT; 95 Eric England DE; 98 Riall Johnson DE; 78 Jeff Keeping NT; Special teams: 1 Noel Prefontaine K/P; 45 Randy Srochenski LS	Linebackers: 10 Antonious Bonner; 35 Kevin Eiben; 2 Michael Fletcher; 52 Raymond Fontaine; 39 David Hewson; 50 Mike O'Shea; Defensive backs: 3 Kahlil Carter; 8 Chris Hardy; 13 Clifford Ivory; 25 Leron Mitchell; 28 Byron Parker; 21 Orlondo Steinauer; 30 Kenny Wheaton; 32 Chuck Winters; 26 Jordan Younger	Reserve roster: 37 David Donaldson DB; 24 Jermaine Mays DB; 15 Tony Miles WR; 67 Cliff Washburn T; Injured list: 7 Eric Crouch QB; 65 Jerome Davis T; 84 Shockmain Davis WR; 33 Jeff Johnson RB; 51 Jeff Kelly LB; 93 Matt Kudu NT; 11 John Williams RB; Italics indicate International player

== Awards and records ==
Despite their early exit from the playoffs, the Boatmen finished the season with 11 East Division All-Stars and three CFL All-Stars. Kicker/Punter Noel Prefontaine was once again named the East's Most Outstanding Special Teams Player and elusive receiver Arland Bruce III finished with a division leading 1,370 yards receiving and 11 touchdowns. A bright star on defence came in the form of CB Byron Parker. The speedy defender re-joined the Boatmen mid-season and made his mark in both the Argos and the CFL record books in only nine regular season contests. By season's end, the Tulane product had accumulated 8 interceptions for a CFL record 348 return yards and 4 touchdowns. Linebacker Mike O'Shea became just the third player, and first Canadian, in CFL history to record 1,000 or more defensive tackles in a career.

=== CFL All-Stars: Offence ===
- WR – Arland Bruce III

=== CFL All-Stars: Defence ===
- CB – Byron Parker

=== CFL All-Stars: Special teams ===
- P – Noel Prefontaine

=== CFL Eastern All-Stars: Offence ===
- WR – Arland Bruce III
- OT – Bernard Williams
- OT – Jerome Davis
- OG – Jude St. John

=== CFL Eastern All-Stars: Defence ===
- DE – Jonathan Brown
- LB – Kevin Eiben
- DB – Kenny Wheaton
- CB – Byron Parker
- CB – Jordan Younger
- DS – Orlondo Steinauer

=== CFL Eastern All-Stars: Special teams ===
- P – Noel Prefontaine
