= Da'shawn Thomas =

American gridiron football player (born 1987)

Profile
- Position: Running back

Personal information
- Born: August 31, 1987 (age 39); Newport, Arkansas, U.S.
- Listed height: 5 ft 11 in (1.80 m)
- Listed weight: 203 lb (92 kg)

Career information
- High school: Conyers (GA) Salem
- University: Western Ontario
- NFL draft: 2010: undrafted

Career history
- Toronto Argonauts (2008–2009)*
- * Offseason or practice squad member only

Da'shawn Thomas
Medal record

Men's American football

Representing United States

World Championship
Gold medal – first place	2011 Austria	Team competition

Da'shawn Thomas (August 31, 1987) is a former Canadian football running back from the U.S.. He was signed as a street free agent by the Georgia Generals in 2007.

== Professional career ==
Thomas was signed as a free agent by the Toronto Argonauts of the Canadian Football League on February 29, 2008, and placed on the practice roster for the 2008 Toronto Argonauts season. He re-signed with the Argos on January 19, 2009, but was released at the end of training camp.

== College career ==
In an unusual move, Thomas, who had never attended university and only a few days of a junior college in Kansas, registered with the University of Western Ontario to play for the Western Ontario Mustangs in the 2009 CIS football season. The National Collegiate Athletic Association does not permit an athlete with any professional sports experience to play on a college team. However, since CIS football typically discounts one year for every year of professional experience, it was the only opportunity for Thomas to prepare for the 2010 NFL draft. Former Mustang Vaughn Martin was drafted in the 2009 NFL draft and former Mustangs receiver and Argonaut Tyler Scott and former Argonauts coach Rich Stubler recommended Thomas to Mustangs coach Greg Marshall.
