= Heatly =

Heatly is a surname. Notable people with the surname include:

- Kenny Heatly (born 1982), American football player and player of Canadian football
- Peter Heatly (1924–2015), Scottish diver
- Suetonius Grant Heatly (1751–1793), British judge
- William S. Heatly (1912–1984), American politician
- Basil Heatley (1933–2019), British athlete.
- Bill Heatley (1920–1971), Australian politician.
- Bob Heatley (1895–1973), Australian footballer.
- Craig Heatley (born 1956), New Zealand businessman.
- David Heatley (born 1974), American cartoonist.
