= Dominique Dorsey =

American gridiron football player (born 1983)

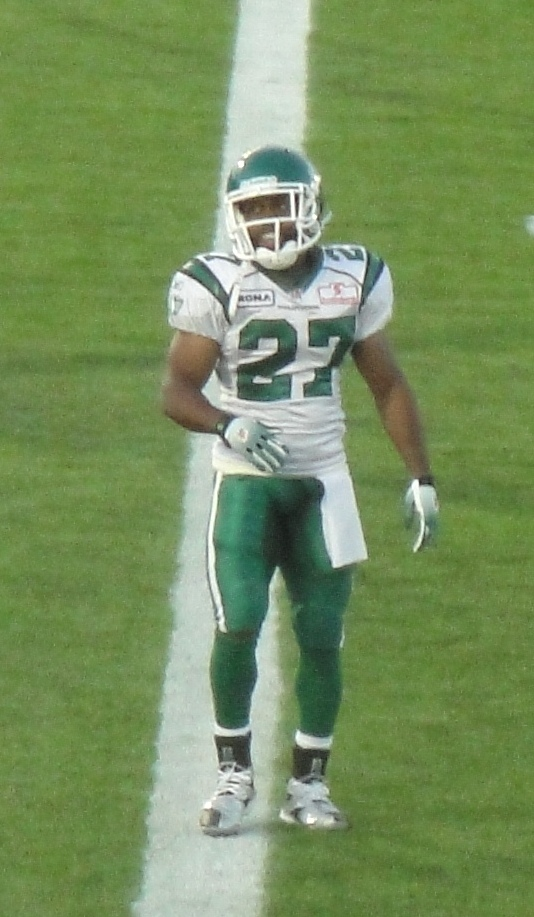

Profile
- Position: Running back

Personal information
- Born: May 7, 1983 (age 43); Victorville, California, U.S.
- Listed height: 5 ft 7 in (1.70 m)
- Listed weight: 173 lb (78 kg)

Career information
- High school: Tulare Union (Tulare, California)
- College: UNLV

Career history
- 2005–2006: Saskatchewan Roughriders
- 2007: Winnipeg Blue Bombers*
- 2007–2008: Toronto Argonauts
- 2009: Washington Redskins*
- 2009: Toronto Argonauts
- 2010: Saskatchewan Roughriders
- * Offseason or practice squad member only

Awards and highlights
- John Agro Special Teams Award (2008); CFL All-Star (2008); 2× CFL East All-Star (2007, 2008); MW Freshman of the Year (2001); First-team All-MW (2004)
- Stats at CFL.ca (archive)

Dominique Ramone Dorsey (born May 7, 1983) is a former professional gridiron football running back and return specialist. He most recently played for the Saskatchewan Roughriders of the Canadian Football League. He was originally signed by the Roughriders as an undrafted free agent in 2005. He played college football for the UNLV Rebels.

Dorsey was also a member of the Toronto Argonauts, Winnipeg Blue Bombers, and Washington Redskins.

== Early life ==
Dorsey played high school football at Tulare Union High School in Tulare, California where he set multiple school and section records, including the record for career touchdowns (118).

== Professional career ==
=== Saskatchewan Roughriders ===
Dorsey signed with the Saskatchewan Roughriders in 2005 and played as a backup to Corey Holmes and Kenton Keith. After Holmes was traded in the following offseason, he had a bigger role in special teams in 2006, and was named the CFL's Special Teams Player of the Week three times throughout the season.

=== Winnipeg Blue Bombers ===
Along with defensive end Dwan Epps, Dorsey was traded to the Winnipeg Blue Bombers in exchange for offensive tackle Eric Wilson on May 30, 2007. Dorsey appeared in two preseason games for the Blue Bombers before being waived on June 24.

=== Toronto Argonauts ===
On August 2, 2007, in his first ever game with the Toronto Argonauts of the Canadian Football League, Dorsey tied a league record, set by then teammate Bashir Levingston earlier in the year, for the longest missed field goal return with a 129-yard touchdown return against the Montreal Alouettes.

In 2008, Dorsey was named a CFL All-Star on special teams and awarded the John Agro Special Teams Award as the league's most outstanding special teams player. Dorsey finished the year with a league high 2,892 all-purpose yards despite missing five games due to injury.

=== Washington Redskins ===
On February 4, 2009, Dorsey signed with the Washington Redskins and played in four pre-season games before being released on September 5, 2009.

=== Return to Argonauts ===
On September 15, 2009, Dorsey returned to the Argonauts, but was injured after playing in only four games.

=== Return to Roughriders ===
On February 17, 2010, Dorsey re-signed with the Saskatchewan Roughriders as a free agent. He played in the first ten games of the season before being placed on the nine-game injured list for the remainder of the season. He was released during the following off-season.

== Career statistics ==
| Rushing | | Regular season | | | | | | | Playoffs |
| Year | Team | Games | No. | Yards | Avg | Long | TD | Fumb | Games | No. | Yards | Avg | Long | TD | Fumb |
|---|---|---|---|---|---|---|---|---|---|---|---|---|---|---|---|
| 2005 | SSK | 5 | 1 | 8 | 8.0 | 8 | 0 | 1 | 1 | 0 | 0 | 0.0 | 0 | 0 | 1 |
| 2006 | SSK | 14 | 31 | 151 | 4.9 | 25 | 2 | 3 | 2 | 1 | 3 | 3.0 | 3 | 0 | 1 |
| 2007 | TOR | 13 | 23 | 88 | 3.8 | 18 | 0 | 2 | 1 | 0 | 0 | 0.0 | 0 | 0 | 0 |
| 2008 | TOR | 13 | 64 | 410 | 6.4 | 32 | 2 | 2 | Team did not qualify |
| 2009 | TOR | 4 | 0 | 0 | 0.0 | 0 | 0 | 0 | Team did not qualify |
| 2010 | SSK | 10 | 0 | 0 | 0.0 | 0 | 0 | 2 | Placed on injured reserve |
| CFL totals | | 59 | 119 | 657 | 5.5 | 32 | 4 | 10 | 4 | 1 | 3 | 3.0 | 3 | 0 | 2 |

| Receiving | | Regular season | | | | | | Playoffs |
| Year | Team | Games | No. | Yards | Avg | Long | TD | Games | No. | Yards | Avg | Long | TD |
|---|---|---|---|---|---|---|---|---|---|---|---|---|---|
| 2005 | SSK | 5 | 0 | 0 | 0.0 | 0 | 0 | 1 | 0 | 0 | 0.0 | 0 | 0 |
| 2006 | SSK | 14 | 7 | 66 | 9.4 | 15 | 0 | 2 | 0 | 0 | 0.0 | 0 | 0 |
| 2007 | TOR | 13 | 4 | 29 | 7.3 | 15 | 0 | 1 | 0 | 0 | 0.0 | 0 | 0 |
| 2008 | TOR | 13 | 15 | 286 | 19.1 | 81 | 0 | Team did not qualify |
| 2009 | TOR | 4 | 0 | 0 | 0.0 | 0 | 0 | Team did not qualify |
| 2010 | SSK | 10 | 0 | 0 | 0.0 | 0 | 0 | Placed on injured reserve |
| CFL totals | | 59 | 26 | 381 | 14.7 | 81 | 0 | 4 | 0 | 0 | 0.0 | 0 | 0 |

| Punt Returns | | Regular season | | | | | | Playoffs |
| Year | Team | Games | No. | Yards | Avg | Long | TD | Games | No. | Yards | Avg | Long | TD |
|---|---|---|---|---|---|---|---|---|---|---|---|---|---|
| 2005 | SSK | 5 | 21 | 247 | 11.8 | 65 | 0 | 1 | 3 | 40 | 13.3 | 16 | 0 |
| 2006 | SSK | 14 | 54 | 591 | 10.9 | 49 | 0 | 2 | 4 | 33 | 8.3 | 17 | 0 |
| 2007 | TOR | 13 | 65 | 703 | 10.8 | 69 | 1 | 1 | 7 | 73 | 10.4 | 44 | 0 |
| 2008 | TOR | 13 | 63 | 752 | 11.9 | 94 | 1 | Team did not qualify |
| 2009 | TOR | 4 | 10 | 73 | 7.3 | | 0 | Team did not qualify |
| 2010 | SSK | 10 | 46 | 286 | 6.2 | | 0 | Placed on injured reserve |
| CFL totals | | 59 | 259 | 2652 | 10.2 | 94 | 2 | 4 | 14 | 146 | 10.4 | 44 | 0 |

| Kickoff Returns | | Regular season | | | | | | Playoffs |
| Year | Team | Games | No. | Yards | Avg | Long | TD | Games | No. | Yards | Avg | Long | TD |
|---|---|---|---|---|---|---|---|---|---|---|---|---|---|
| 2005 | SSK | 5 | 13 | 267 | 20.5 | 34 | 0 | 1 | 1 | 14 | 14.0 | 14 | 0 |
| 2006 | SSK | 14 | 39 | 757 | 19.4 | 50 | 0 | 2 | 10 | 220 | 22.0 | 34 | 0 |
| 2007 | TOR | 13 | 26 | 622 | 23.9 | 97 | 1 | 1 | 3 | 73 | 24.3 | 27 | 0 |
| 2008 | TOR | 13 | 50 | 1257 | 25.1 | 92 | 1 | Team did not qualify |
| 2009 | TOR | 4 | 17 | 336 | 19.8 | 34 | 0 | Team did not qualify |
| 2010 | SSK | 10 | 24 | 500 | 20.8 | 31 | 0 | Placed on injured reserve |
| CFL totals | | 59 | 169 | 3739 | 22.1 | 97 | 2 | 4 | 14 | 307 | 21.9 | 34 | 0 |

| Missed FG Returns | | Regular season | | | | | | Playoffs |
| Year | Team | Games | No. | Yards | Avg | Long | TD | Games | No. | Yards | Avg | Long | TD |
|---|---|---|---|---|---|---|---|---|---|---|---|---|---|
| 2005 | SSK | 5 | 0 | 0 | 0.0 | 0 | 0 | 1 | 0 | 0 | 0.0 | 0 | 0 |
| 2006 | SSK | 14 | 7 | 84 | 12.0 | 23 | 0 | 2 | 1 | 33 | 33.0 | 33 | 0 |
| 2007 | TOR | 13 | 3 | 186 | 62.0 | 129 | 1 | 1 | 0 | 0 | 0.0 | 0 | 0 |
| 2008 | TOR | 13 | 5 | 187 | 37.4 | 63 | 0 | Team did not qualify |
| 2009 | TOR | 4 | 2 | 74 | 37.0 | 51 | 0 | Team did not qualify |
| 2010 | SSK | 10 | 1 | 18 | 18.0 | 18 | 0 | Placed on injured reserve |
| CFL totals | | 59 | 18 | 549 | 30.5 | 129 | 1 | 4 | 1 | 33 | 33.0 | 33 | 0 |
