= Jonathan St-Pierre =

Canadian football player (born 1983)

Profile
- Position: OL

Personal information
- Born: September 15, 1983 (age 43); Longueuil, Quebec
- Listed height: 6 ft 3 in (1.91 m)
- Listed weight: 305 lb (138 kg)

Career information
- College: Illinois State University
- CFL draft: 2008: 2nd round, 10th overall pick

Career history
- 2009–2010: Saskatchewan Roughriders
- 2010–2012: Toronto Argonauts
- 2012: Calgary Stampeders*
- * Offseason or practice squad member only

Jonathan St-Pierre (born September 15, 1983) is a Canadian former professional football offensive lineman. He was drafted by the Saskatchewan Roughriders in the second round of the 2008 CFL draft. St-Pierre played college football for the Illinois State Redbirds. He was traded to the Toronto Argonauts on January 6, 2010, for non-import wide receiver Obed Cétoute.

On September 5, 2012, St-Pierre was released by the Toronto Argonauts. On September 25 he signed onto the practice roster of the Calgary Stampeders.

St-Pierre retired from professional football on January 30, 2013.
