= Pinball Clemons =

American-Canadian sports executive (born 1965)

Pinball Clemons OOnt MSM
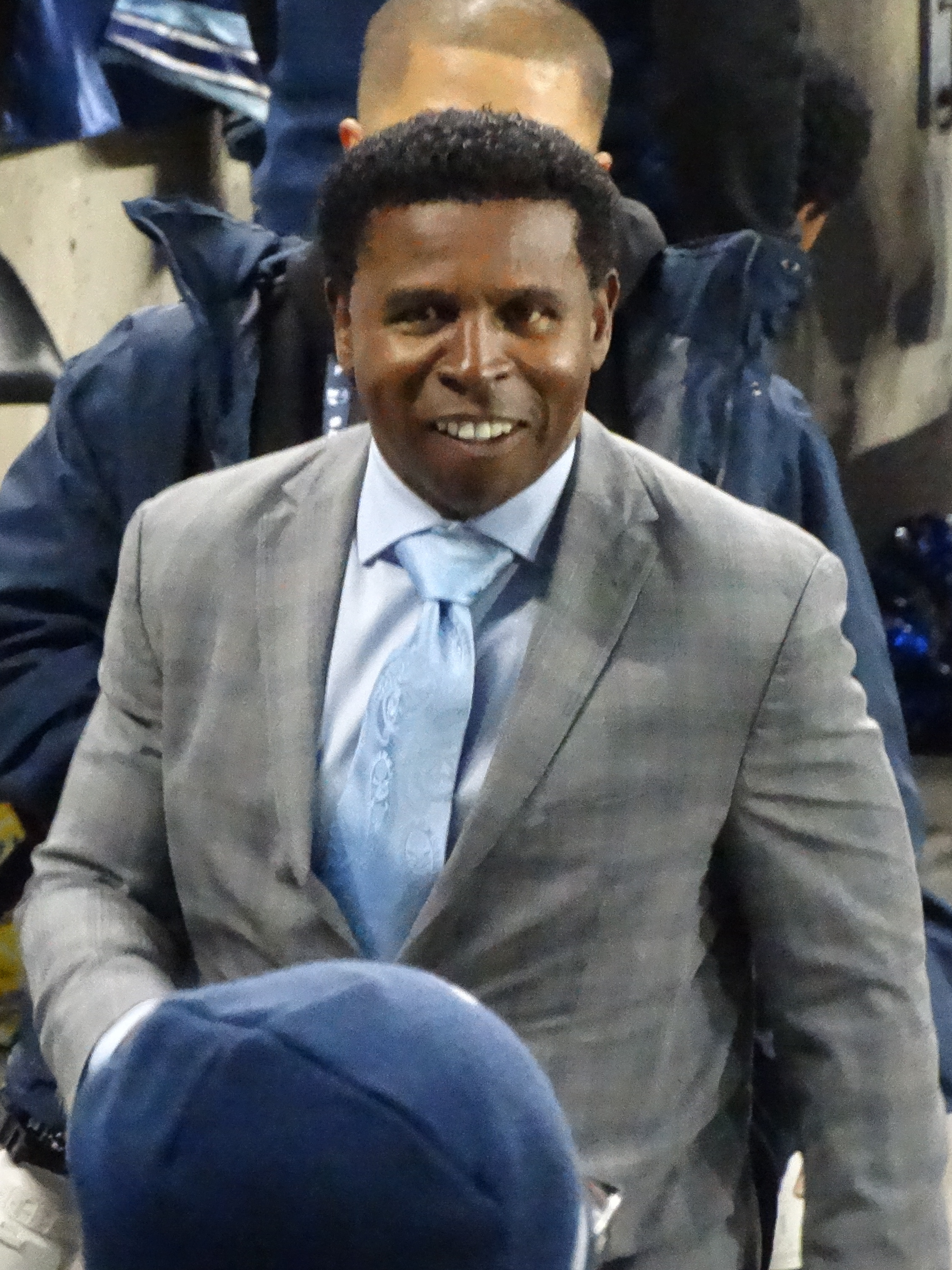
- Clemons with the Toronto Argonauts in 2023
- Born: Michael Lutrell Clemons; January 15, 1965 (age 61); Dunedin, Florida, U.S.
- Football career

Toronto Argonauts
- Title: General manager

Personal information
- Listed height: 5 ft 5 in (1.65 m)
- Listed weight: 166 lb (75 kg)

Career information
- Positions: Running back, return specialist (No. 31)
- High school: Dunedin
- College: William & Mary
- NFL draft: 1987: 8th round, 218th overall pick

Career history

Playing
- Kansas City Chiefs (1987); Tampa Bay Buccaneers (1988)*; Toronto Argonauts (1989–2000)
- * Offseason or practice squad member only

Coaching
- Toronto Argonauts (2000–2007) Head coach; As an administrator: Toronto Argonauts (2001–2002) President; Toronto Argonauts (2003) General manager; Toronto Argonauts (2008) Chief executive officer; Toronto Argonauts (2009–2019) Vice chairman; Toronto Argonauts (2019–present) General manager

Awards and highlights
- 8× Grey Cup champion (1991, 1996, 1997, 2004, 2012, 2017, 2022, 2024); 2× CFL All-Star (1990, 1997); Toronto Argonauts No. 31 retired; 3× CFL East All-Star (1990, 1994, 1997); Jeff Russel Trophy (1990); CFL Most Outstanding Player (1993); Tom Pate Memorial Award (1993, 1996); CFL record: CFL most combined yards, all-time regular season: 25,438
- Stats at Pro Football Reference
- Canadian Football Hall of Fame

Michael Lutrell "Pinball" Clemons (born January 15, 1965) is an American-Canadian sports executive and former running back and return specialist who serves as general manager for the Toronto Argonauts of the Canadian Football League (CFL). He is considered by many to be one of the greatest and most famous Argonauts players of all time.

A native of Dunedin, Florida, Clemons played college football at the College of William & Mary and was drafted in the eighth round of the 1987 NFL draft by the Kansas City Chiefs. After two years in the NFL, Clemons joined the Argonauts in 1989, playing with them for twelve seasons where he was a two-time All-Star and a three-time Grey Cup Champion. After retiring from playing, he twice served as their head coach before becoming an administrator, since winning five more Grey Cups. His No. 31 jersey is one of only four that have been retired by the Argonauts.

== Early life ==
Clemons was born on January 15, 1965, in Dunedin, Florida, to an 18-year-old single mother, Anna Marie Bryant, who had just graduated from a segregated high school. His father, Willie Clemons, lived an hour and a half away from them while finishing up his university education and later became a school teacher.

Clemons started playing football at age 8 with the Dunedin Golden Eagles, a youth organization co-ordinated by the Police Athletic League.

Clemons and his mother lived in public housing across the street from the city's sewer plant until he was 14 years old. At this point in Clemons's life, his mother married his stepfather and would also become the first African-American to get an administrative job for the City of Dunedin.

Clemons's mother was also a heavy influence in him becoming a devout Christian as she was also a clerk at a Baptist church in Dunedin. Clemons and his family currently attend the Meeting House in Oakville, Ontario.

Clemons later formed a relationship with his father, Willie, during his college years. Even then, the relationship between him and his father was more like a nephew to an uncle, being limited to visits during his family vacations down in Florida and regular phone calls. Willie was also invited to the 2003 CFL Eastern Division semi-final game his son was coaching in Toronto vs. the B.C. Lions, marking the first time his father had actually seen him in any capacity with the Argonauts. Shortly afterwards, his father died.

== College career ==
Clemons played college football at the College of William and Mary, where he played as a running back and return specialist on the football team, as well as playing varsity soccer for a year. In his four-year college football career, he compiled 4,778 all-purpose yards and was named a Division I-AA all-American.

== Professional career ==
Pre-draft measurables
Height	Weight	Arm length	Hand span	40-yard dash	10-yard split	20-yard split	20-yard shuttle	Vertical jump	Broad jump	Bench press
5 ft 4 7/8 in (1.65 m)	163 lb (74 kg)	28 1/4 in (0.72 m)	8 1/4 in (0.21 m)	4.67 s	1.62 s	2.71 s	4.42 s	29.0 in (0.74 m)	9 ft 0 in (2.74 m)	9 reps
All values from NFL Combine

Clemons was selected by the Kansas City Chiefs in the eighth round of the 1987 NFL draft. During the 1987 NFL season, Clemons played in eight games, predominantly as a punt returner, where he collected 19 returns for 162 yards.

When Clemons first joined the Toronto Argonauts in 1989, guest running backs coach Tom Cudney nicknamed him "Pinball" because of his running style. His diminutive size and extraordinary balance allowed him to bounce between defensive players much like a pinball inside a pinball machine. During home games, The Who song "Pinball Wizard" would play on the P.A. each time Clemons was involved in a great play. In his first game with the Argonauts, Clemons was named the player of the game. In 1990, Clemons received the CFL's Most Outstanding Player Award after setting a single season record for all-purpose yards (3,300). The following year, Clemons won his very first football championship as his Argonauts defeated the Calgary Stampeders to win the Grey Cup. Clemons went on to win two more Grey Cups as a player when Doug Flutie led the Argonauts to win back-to-back titles during the 1996 & 1997 seasons. In 1997, Clemons surpassed his own single season all-purpose yards record from 1990 by recording 3,840 all-purpose yards. This mark stood until 2012 when it was broken by Chad Owens. On September 15, 2000, Clemons played his last ever game as an Argonaut. During his 12-year playing career with the Argonauts he set many team records including career pass receptions (682), punt return yards (6,025), punt returns (610), punt return touchdowns (8), kickoff return yards (6,349), and kickoff returns (300). He also set single season single-season punt return yards (1,070 in 1997), punt returns (111 in 1997), and kickoff returns (49 in 1997). Clemons also amassed a career 25,438 combined yards during the regular season, a CFL record.

In 2008, Clemons was inducted into the Canadian Football Hall of Fame, and was also inducted into the Ontario Sports Hall of Fame in 2009. In 2016, he was awarded the Order of Sport, marking his induction into Canada's Sports Hall of Fame.

== Coaching career ==
Clemons pictured in 2008.

Upon ending his playing career, Clemons became interim head coach of the Toronto Argonauts in 2000, replacing John Huard, who resigned after compiling a 1–6–1 record. When offered the head coaching job by team general manager J. I. Albrecht, Clemons was reluctant to accept it, wanting to spend more time with his family. According to Clemons, "it was an awkward situation. After saying no, they said do us the favour of going home and discussing it with your family. The burden was that this team, this organization, had given our family so much that Canada was going to be our home. The Argos had everything to do with my family becoming a part of this country. Because of all I had been given I decided it was my time to reciprocate." As interim head coach, Clemons coached the Argos to 6 wins out of their remaining 8 games. He had the interim tag removed from his title at the end of the season. In November 2001, he was promoted to President of the Argonauts and relinquished his role as head coach in the process to Gary Etcheverry.

When Etcheverry was fired as head coach on September 17, 2002, Clemons returned as head coach on an interim basis with 6 games remaining in the 2002 CFL season. Clemons was officially given the head coaching job again on December 17, 2002, while also relinquishing his role as team president. He remained the head coach until 2007. Clemons was nominated for the Annis Stukus Trophy every year from 2002 to 2007, coming up short each time.

In the 2004 CFL season, Clemons was the first black head coach to ever appear in a Grey Cup game. He became the first black head coach to win a Grey Cup championship during that same Grey Cup game, while also being the second black coach to ever guide his team to a pro football championship in North America. (Darren Arbet of the San Jose SaberCats was the first to do so in 2002 with an ArenaBowl XVI victory.) Clemons downplayed this milestone achievement, saying, "To tell you the truth, I don't know what it means to be the first Black coach in the (Grey) Cup and to win it. I know that I can't do anything by myself, and on my own strength I'm very little good. Anything I accomplish has to be with the aid of individuals, and this team became like a family and is a family, it had very little to do with the colour of my skin".

Clemons has the second most head coaching wins in Argonauts history with 67. (Bob O'Billovich is first with 89.) Clemons's record is 67–54–1 in the regular season over parts of seven seasons, with a 6–5 playoff record (including 1–0 in his lone Grey Cup appearance). As a coach, his nickname was often shortened to "Pinner" by his players. After retiring as head coach, he became the team's chief executive officer in 2008.

=== CFL coaching record ===
Team	Year	Regular Season					Post Season		
Team	Year	Won	Lost	Ties	Win %	Finish	Won	Lost	Result
TOR	2000	6	4	0	.600	4th in East Division	–	–	Missed playoffs
TOR	2001	7	11	0	.389	4th in East Division	–	–	Missed playoffs
TOR	2002	4	2	0	.667	2nd in East Division	1	1	Lost in Division Finals
TOR	2003	9	9	0	.500	2nd in East Division	1	1	Lost in Division Finals
TOR	2004	10	7	1	.583	2nd in East Division	3	0	Won Grey Cup
TOR	2005	11	7	0	.611	1st in East Division	0	1	Lost in Division Finals
TOR	2006	10	8	0	.556	2nd in East Division	1	1	Lost in Division Finals
TOR	2007	11	7	0	.611	1st in East Division	0	1	Lost in Division Finals
Total		68	55	1	.553	2 East Division; Championships	6	5	1 Grey Cup

=== Coaching tree ===
Assistants under Clemons that became NFL, CFL, or NCAA head coaches:

- Aaron Best: Eastern Washington (2017–present)

== Sports administrator ==
From November 2001 to September 2002, Clemons served as the Toronto Argonauts President. He ended his tenure as president to resume his second stint as the team's head coach. In 2003, Clemons shared both responsibilities as the team's head coach & general manager. Though he was the de facto GM of the Argonauts as a result of an administrative shake up of the team, much of the player roster management duties were deferred to Greg Mohns, the team's director of football operations & player personnel. Clemons would relinquish his GM title to Adam Rita at the end of the season. On December 4, 2007, Clemons stepped down as head coach of the Argonauts to become their new chief executive officer. At the end of the 2008 Toronto Argonauts season, Clemons announced that he would no longer act in the day-to-day business of the organization and on May 6, 2009, Bob Nicholson was announced as the new president and chief executive officer of the Argonauts. On that same day, Clemons was appointed the vice-chair of the team. In his new role, Clemons advises the president & C.E.O. on key sales and corporate partner programs, significant community initiatives, and brand and media relations. On October 8, 2019, Clemons was named as the new general manager of the team, replacing Jim Popp who was relieved of his GM duties with 4 games remaining in the 2019 Toronto Argonauts season. Clemons would also work closely with John Murphy, the team's vice president of player personnel, in assembling the roster.

=== CFL GM record ===
Team	Year	Regular Season					Post Season		
Team	Year	Won	Lost	Ties	Win %	Finish	Won	Lost	Result
TOR	2003	9	9	0	.500	2nd in East Division	1	1	Lost in East Final
TOR	2019	2	2	0	.500	4th in East Division	-	-	Did not qualify
TOR	2021	9	5	0	.643	1st in East Division	0	1	Lost in East Final
TOR	2022	11	7	0	.611	1st in East Division	2	0	Won Grey Cup
TOR	2023	16	2	0	.888	1st in East Division	0	1	Lost in East Final
TOR	2024	10	8	0	.556	2nd in East Division	3	0	Won Grey Cup
TOR	2025	5	13	0	.278	4th in East Division	–	–	Did not qualify
Total		62	46	0	.574	3 East Division; Championships	6	3	2 Grey Cups

== Football achievements ==
- CFL record for most all-purpose yards, All-Time Regular Season: 25,396 (1989–2000)
- Recorded over 5,000 career yards in rushing (5,232), pass receptions (7,015), kickoff returns (6,349), and punt returns (6,025)
- Argonauts team records for career pass receptions (682), punt return yards (6,025), punt returns (610), punt return touchdowns (8), kickoff return yards (6,349), and kickoff returns (300)
- Argonauts team records for single-season punt return yards (1,070 in 1997), punt returns (111 in 1997), and kickoff returns (49 in 1997)
- Argonauts team record for single-game kickoff returns (8) on August 21, 1990, versus Edmonton Eskimos
- CFL most outstanding player (1990)
- Three-time Grey Cup champion as a player (1991, 1996, 1997)
- One-time Grey Cup champion as a head coach (2004)
- Two-time Grey Cup champion as a Vice chairman (2012, 2017)
- Two-time Grey Cup champion as a general manager (2022, 2024)
- First black head coach to reach & win a Grey Cup championship (2004)
- Two-time CFL All-Star (1990, 1997)
- Two-time Tom Pate Award winner (1993, 1996)
- 1995 John Candy Memorial Award
- One-time Eastern Division Most Outstanding Player Trophy winner (1990)
- Four-time Eastern Division All-Star (1990, 1993, 1994, 1997)
- Voted one of the CFL's Top 50 players (#31) of the league's modern era by Canadian sports network TSN.
- Was inducted into the Canadian Football Hall of Fame in 2008.
- Was inducted into the Ontario Sports Hall of Fame in 2009.
- Retired number by the Toronto Argonauts (#31)
- Was awarded the Order of Sport in 2016, marking his induction into Canada's Sports Hall of Fame.
- Was inducted into the Toronto Sport Hall of Honour in 2024.
- In 2012, in honour of the 100th Grey Cup, Canada Post used his image on a series of commemorative postage stamps. The image was also used on presentation posters and other materials to promote the Grey Cup game and other celebrations associated with the centennial.

== Personal life ==
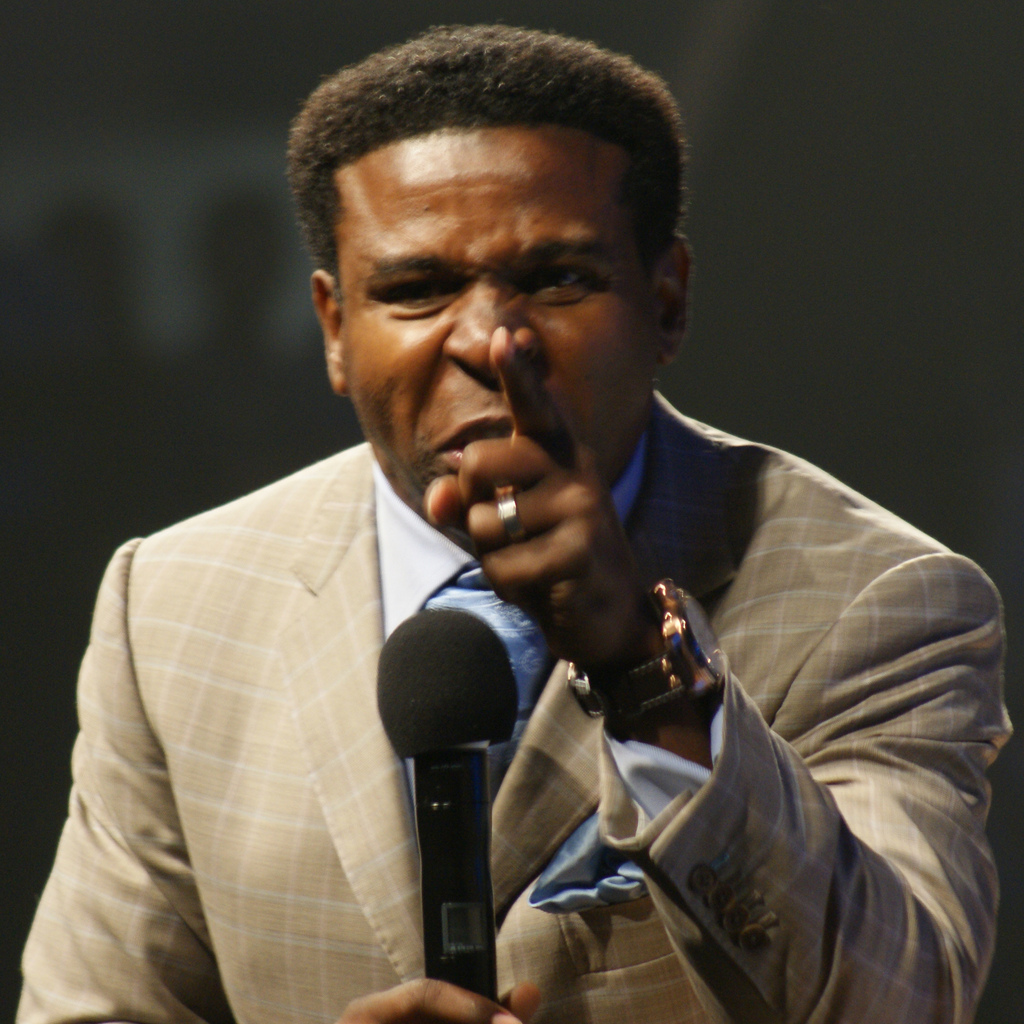
Clemons speaking at We Day Waterloo 2010, a Free the Children event

Clemons is also a motivational speaker, making frequent public appearances throughout the community. He is also a partner of the children's brand Simply Kids, a line of diapers, baby food and healthcare products found in supermarkets across Canada and the United States.

Currently, Clemons resides in Oakville, Ontario, with his wife, Diane (a native Floridian), and three daughters (who were all born in Canada): Rachel, Raven, and Rylie. Clemons has described himself (borrowing a quote from C. D. Howe) as an "American by birth but Canadian by choice". In 2000, Clemons became a permanent resident of Canada. It had once been suggested that Clemons had remained an American citizen to rebuff any calls for him to run for political office, such as for mayor of Toronto. Clemons was the subject of Pinball: The Making of a Canadian Hero (ISBN 978-0-470-83690-3) a biography written by Perry Lefko published in 2006.

In April 2007, he visited Calderstone Middle School in Brampton to help start a reading program.

On August 21, 2007, Clemons founded the "Michael 'Pinball' Clemons Foundation" which is dedicated to helping disadvantaged youth.

On March 23, 2009, Clemons appeared on the CTV News @ 6 as a celebrity guest host to do the weather in celebration of Dave Devall's retirement. He also worked with Marc Kielburger and Craig Kielburger, founders of Free the Children, in an initiative to build schools and clean water systems in Africa.

On November 14, 2012, Clemons visited and gave a speech about life topics in Markham, Ontario, for York Regional District School Board's annual QUEST Forum to promote Student Achievement and Well-Being.

On February 28, 2014, Clemons visited the Scouts Canada National Leadership summit to speak about teamwork and working as one team to kick off the new program and strategic plan announcement.

On April 28, 2015, Clemons officially became a naturalized citizen of Canada.

Clemons was recognized on February 10, 2017, by the College of William and Mary, his alma mater, with an honorary degree during Charter Day ceremonies, where he also was principal speaker.

From February 10–26, 2017, Clemons partnered with Global Pet Foods and Air Miles for the "Show Us Your Heart" event. Its goal is to raise money for homeless pets, rescue groups, and animal shelters across Canada through donations made at Global Pet Food stores.

== Non-football honours ==
- He was appointed as a Member of the Order of Ontario in 2001, giving him the post-nominal letters "O.Ont" for life.
- In 2011, he was one of the recipients of the Top 25 Canadian Immigrant Awards presented by Canadian Immigrant Magazine.
- In 2020, both he and his wife Diane Clemons were awarded the Meritorious Service Medal for their work with the Pinball Clemons Foundation, which provides financial assistance and mentoring to students.
- He was awarded the Canadian Version of the Queen Elizabeth II Golden Jubilee Medal in 2002.
- He was awarded the Canadian Version of the Queen Elizabeth II Diamond Jubilee Medal in 2012.
- He was awarded the Canadian Version of the King Charles III Coronation Medal in 2025.

Clemons has received honorary degrees from several universities. These include:

Location	Date	School	Degree
Ontario, Canada	Fall 2000	York University	Doctor of Laws (LL.D)
Ontario, Canada	June 2013	Humber College	
Virginia, United States	February 10, 2017	College of William & Mary	Doctor of Humane Letters (DHL)
Guelph, Ontario, Canada	June 11, 2024	University of Guelph	Doctor of Laws (LL.D)

In 2022, Clemons received an honorary doctorate from Toronto Metropolitan University.

Awards and achievements
Preceded by Tom Higgins	Grey Cup–winning head coach 92nd Grey Cup, 2004	Succeeded by Danny Maciocia
