= Saint Martin de Porres High School (Detroit) =

American private high school

Coordinates: 42.41563°N 83.17792°W

St. Martin de Porres High School
- 13436 Grove Ave; Detroit, Michigan 48235

Information
- Type: Private, Co-educational
- Closed: 2005
- Grades: 9–12
- Enrollment: 275 (in 2005)
- Colors: Blue and Gold
- Athletics conference: Detroit Catholic High School League
- Nickname: Eagles
- Accreditation: Michigan Association of Non-Public Schools

Detroit St. Martin de Porres High School (short form: "Detroit DePorres", "DePorres", or "DP") was a co-educational college preparatory school in Detroit, Michigan and belonged to the Roman Catholic Archdiocese of Detroit.

St. Martin de Porres was a member of the Michigan High School Athletic Association (MHSAA) and competed athletically in the Catholic High School League (CHSL).

== School demographics ==
St. Martin de Porres was co-educational and had an enrollment 275 students in 2005. The student body was 100% African-American in 2005. There were an average of 24.8 classroom teachers and the student-teacher ratio was 11.08 in 2005.

== Athletic accomplishments ==
St. Martin de Porres holds the MHSAA state record for the most state titles in boys track with fifteen (as of 2015).

The Eagles have the most football state titles on any CHSL school with twelve (as of 2015).

St. Martin de Porres has won seven state championships in boys basketball.

Eagle teams have won three girls track state championships. The girls also have won two basketball state championships.

== Notable alumni ==
- Aloysius Anagonye, American professional basketball player who plays for SOMB Boulogne-sur-Mer of the LNB Pro A. Michigan State Spartan.
- Alan Ball, NFL player, Dallas Cowboys, Jacksonville Jaguars
- Willie Burton, former NBA player, Miami Heat, Philadelphia 76ers, San Antonio Spurs
- Rodney Culver, former NFL player, Indianapolis Colts and San Diego Chargers
- Kevin Glenn, Canadian Football League quarterback, Winnipeg Blue Bombers
- David Grimes, former NFL player. He was a member of the 2005 graduating class, the last class to graduate prior to the school's permanent closing
- Negele Knight, former NBA player, Phoenix Suns, Detroit Pistons
- Troy Kyles, former NFL player, New York Giants
- Lonette McKee, actress, singer
- Lamar Mills, former NFL player
- Chuck Winters, former AFL and CFL player
