= Jamie Robinson (Canadian football) =

American gridiron football player (born 1987)

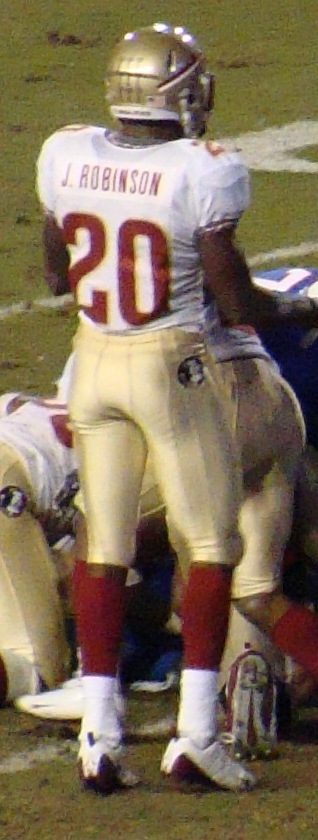
- Robinson with Florida State in 2009

No. 1
- Position: Linebacker

Personal information
- Born: June 28, 1987 (age 39); Rock Hill, South Carolina, U.S.
- Listed height: 6 ft 2 in (1.88 m)
- Listed weight: 192 lb (87 kg)

Career information
- College: Florida State

Career history
- 2013–2014: Toronto Argonauts
- Stats at CFL.ca

Jamie Robinson (born June 28, 1987) is an American former professional football linebacker for the Toronto Argonauts of the Canadian Football League (CFL). He played college football at Florida State.

== College career ==
Robinson played college football at Florida State University from 2005 to 2009. During his career he recorded 154 tackles, five interceptions, one sack and one touchdown.

== Professional career ==
Robinson signed with the Toronto Argonauts of the Canadian Football League in May 2013.
