= Rich Stubler =

American football coach (1949–2023)

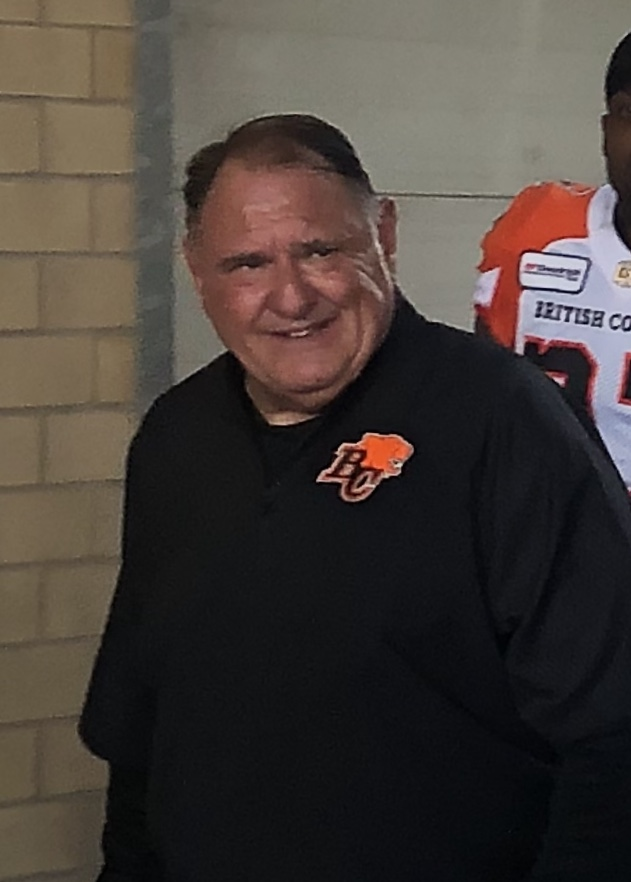
- Stubler before a BC Lions game in 2019

Biographical details
- Born: August 4, 1949; Glenwood Springs, Colorado, U.S.
- Died: August 27, 2023 (aged 74)

Coaching career (HC unless noted)
- 1971–1973: Roaring Fork HS (defence)
- 1974: Colorado (freshmen)
- 1975–1977: New Mexico State (DB coach)
- 1978: SMU (DB coach)
- 1979–1982: Colorado State (DC/DB coach)
- 1983–1989: Hamilton Tiger-Cats (DC)
- 1990: Toronto Argonauts (DC)
- 1991–1995: Edmonton Eskimos (DC)
- 1996–1997: Oregon (DC)
- 1998–1999: Edmonton Eskimos (DC)
- 2000: BC Lions (DC)
- 2001–2002: Detroit Fury (DC)
- 2003–2007: Toronto Argonauts (Asst. HC/DC)
- 2008: Toronto Argonauts
- 2009: Cedaredge HS
- 2010: BC Lions (DL coach)
- 2011: Edmonton Eskimos (DC)
- 2012–2013: BC Lions (DC)
- 2014–2015: Calgary Stampeders (DC)
- 2016: Toronto Argonauts (DC)
- 2018: Montreal Alouettes (DC)
- 2019: BC Lions (DC/LB)
- 2020: Montana State–Northern (DC)
- 2021: Toronto Argonauts (Asst. Coach)
- 2022: Clearwater Academy International (Defensive coordinator)

Richard Stubler (August 4, 1949 – August 27, 2023) was an American football coach, primarily in the Canadian Football League (CFL). He was most recently an assistant coach for the Toronto Argonauts. He is a five-time Grey Cup champion, all as a defensive coordinator, and was formerly the head coach of the Argonauts. He has been coaching since the 1970s and has coached at the high school level, NCAA, Arena Football League and the CFL.

== Coaching career ==
=== Early years ===
Stubler was born in Glenwood Springs, Colorado. After graduating from the University of Northern Colorado, Stubler began his coaching career in 1971 at Roaring Fork High School in Carbondale, Colorado. After winning 30 games and a state championship in three seasons, he moved on in 1974 to be the freshmen coach for the University of Colorado at Boulder team. Stubler was then the New Mexico State Aggies' secondary coach from 1975 to 1977. After that, he spent one season with the Mustangs of Southern Methodist University. Stubler was a member of the Colorado State Rams coaching staff from 1979–82.

=== Canadian Football League ===
Rich Stubler began his CFL coaching career in 1983 when he joined the Hamilton Tiger-Cats, helping lead the team to a Grey Cup in 1986 as linebackers coach. In 1990, Stubler was the defensive coordinator for the Toronto Argonauts. He joined the Edmonton Eskimos’ coaching staff in 1991, winning his second league championship in 1993. Stubler's "Edge" defense was noteworthy for lining up defensive tackles and ends 1-2 yards off the line of scrimmage to offer defensive linemen better vision and tackling angles; it allowed the fewest points in their division in the 1993 season (12-3 record in the CFL West), the second fewest in the 1994 season (13-5 in the CFL West), and the fewest in the 1995 season (13-5 in the CFL North).

=== University of Oregon ===
Following the 1995 season, Stubler was hired as Defensive Coordinator by University of Oregon Head Coach Mike Bellotti. Bellotti, with a team fresh off appearances in the 1994 Rose Bowl (with Nick Allioti, Defensive Coordinator) and the 1995 Cotton Bowl (with Charlie Waters, Defensive Coordinator), was intrigued by Stubler's defensive innovation. Whether due to personnel, strategy, or the differences between CFL and NCAA football, Stubler's Oregon defenses could not duplicate Edmonton's success: Oregon finished the 1996 Pac-10 season with the 9th rated defense in the conference, a 6-5 (3-5 Pac-10) record, and did not go to a bowl; Oregon finished the 1997 Pac-10 season with the 10th rated defense (440.5 ypg, 30.6 ppg) in the conference, a 7-5 (3-5 Pac-10) record, and played in the Las Vegas Bowl. Stubler resigned from Oregon prior to the Las Vegas Bowl in December, 1997.

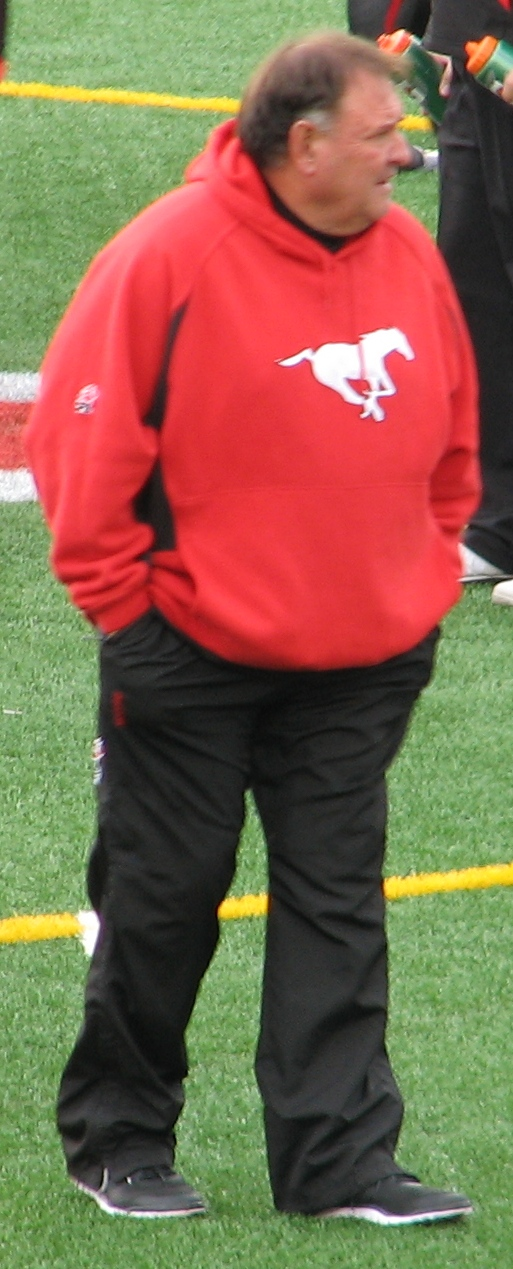
Stubler, with the Stampeders, on the field at McMahon Stadium before the CFL's Western Division Final on 23 November 2014.

=== Canadian Football League (II) ===
Stubler resumed his career in the CFL, rejoining the Edmonton Eskimos from 1998 to 1999 before moving on to help the BC Lions capture the Grey Cup in 2000.

=== Arena Football League ===
Stubler coached in the Arena Football League as the defensive coordinator for the expansion Detroit Fury from 2001 to 2002.

=== Canadian Football League (III) ===
Upon the conclusion of both AFL seasons, Stubler rejoined the Toronto Argonauts late into their seasons as a defensive consultant. In 2003 Stubler joined the Argonauts full-time as their defensive coordinator. In 2004, the Argonauts defeated the BC Lions 27–19 in the 92nd Grey Cup to give Stubler his fourth championship. On December 6, 2007, he was announced to replace the outgoing Pinball Clemons as head coach of the Argonauts for 2008. After a 4–6 start to the 2008 season, Stubler was fired as head coach of the Toronto Argonauts on September 9, 2008, and replaced with former Argonauts' head coach Don Matthews.

=== High school ===
For the 2009 off-season and the 2009 season, Stubler was hired by Cedaredge High School, the small public high school of Cedaredge, Colorado, as head coach. Stubler explained his choice for the no-name football team with needing a break. The team, which had shown weak performances in previous years, finished the season with Stubler with 2 wins out of 10 games (no draws).

=== Canadian Football League (IV) ===
On March 21, 2010, it was announced that Stubler had accepted a defensive line coaching position with the BC Lions. For the 2011 season, Stubler returned for his third stint with the Eskimos, as the team's defensive coordinator. He then returned to the Lions for the 2012 and 2013 seasons, this time as the team's defensive coordinator.

On December 19, 2013, Stubler was announced as the defensive coordinator for the Calgary Stampeders. He won his fifth Grey Cup championship as the Stampeders won the 102nd Grey Cup in 2014. He also spent the 2015 season with the Stampeders before moving on to the Toronto Argonauts for the 2016 season.

On January 3, 2018, Stubler became the special adviser to defensive coordinator Kahlil Carter for the Montreal Alouettes for the 2018 CFL season. Following Carter's pre-season reassignment, he was then named the team's defensive coordinator. On December 17, 2018, he was hired as the defensive coordinator of the BC Lions, a role he held in 2000. He spent one season with the Lions and was not retained following head coach DeVone Claybrooks' dismissal after his one year with the club.

He did not coach in 2020 due to the cancellation of the 2020 CFL season and joined the Toronto Argonauts in an assistant coach capacity in July 2021. He was not retained by the team for the 2022 season.

== Death ==
Stubler died on August 27, 2023, at the age of 74.

== CFL coaching record ==
Team	Year	Regular season					Postseason		
Team	Year	Won	Lost	Ties	Win %	Finish	Won	Lost	Result
TOR	2008	4	6	0	.400	3rd in East Division	–	–	Fired
