= T. J. Acree =

American gridiron football player (born 1982)

Profile
- Position: Wide receiver

Personal information
- Born: July 21, 1982 (age 44); Pocatello, Idaho, U.S.
- Listed height: 6 ft 0 in (1.83 m)
- Listed weight: 180 lb (82 kg)

Career information
- High school: Highland HS
- College: Boise State

Career history
- 2005–2006: BC Lions
- 2007: Edmonton Eskimos
- 2008: Toronto Argonauts
- 2008: Saskatchewan Roughriders

T. J. Acree (born July 21, 1982) is an American former professional football wide receiver for multiple teams in the Canadian Football League. From 2005 to 2008, Acree played for the BC Lions, Edmonton Eskimos, Toronto Argonauts, and Saskatchewan Roughriders.

== College career ==
Acree played college football for the Boise State Broncos, starting as a walk-on. He wasn't actively recruited by any college football programs out of high school, and Boise State showed little interest in him initially. Boise State invited Acree to walk-on primarily at the recommendation of Broncos coach Dirk Koetter's brother, who coached Acree at Highland High School. After redshirting in his true freshman year, he caught a single pass for eight yards in his first year as an active player. He played in seven games as a sophomore but made no receptions. In his junior year, Acree was given a scholarship for the first time and began to play an active role as a receiver. He finished the year with 51 catches for 758 yards and seven touchdowns. Acree's success continued in his final year with the Broncos, as he finished with 55 receptions for 947 yards and eight touchdowns, all career-highs.

== Professional career ==
Acree was signed by the BC Lions in 2005, and he spent most of his time on the practice squad in his rookie year. The Lions resigned Acree for the 2006 season, and he emerged as a competent receiver, making 28 catches for 266 yards while playing in eight games.

In February 2007, the Eskimos signed Acree to a contract. He enjoyed a breakout season, turning 32 receptions into 478 yards.

Acree was signed by the Toronto Argonauts and later traded to the Saskatchewean Roughriders. He dealt with a recurring foot injury throughout the 2008 season, and played in only one game with each team.

== Legal issues ==
Acree was arrested on August 26, 2006, while police were responding to an assault. During the incident, police deployed a taser against Acree after he allegedly failed to comply with their orders. No charges were filed. Acree stated that he considered pursuing a legal case due to excessive use of force.

== Season statistics ==
			Receiving					Punt returns					Kick returns					Misc	
Year	Team	GP	Catches	Yards	Avg	Long	TD	PR	Yards	Avg	Long	TD	KR	Yards	Avg	Long	TD	Fumbles	Tackles
2005	BC	1	0	0	0	0	0	0	0	0	0	0	0	0	0	0	0	0	0
2006	BC	8	28	266	9.5	25	0	5	28	5.6	13	0	1	17	17.0	0	0	1	0
2007	EDM	11	32	478	14.9	75	3	2	11	5.5	8	0	2	26	13.0	26	0	1	1
2008	TOR	1	2	11	5.5	6	0	0	0	0	0	0	0	0	0	0	0	0	0
2008	SAS	1	0	0	0	0	0	0	0	0	0	0	0	0	0	0	0	0	0
Total		22	62	755	12.2	75	3	7	39	5.6	13	0	3	43	14.3	26	0	2	1
