= Ronald Flemons =

American gridiron football player (born 1979)

No. 99
- Positions: Defensive end, Defensive tackle

Personal information
- Born: October 20, 1979 (age 47); San Antonio, Texas, U.S.
- Listed height: 6 ft 6 in (1.98 m)
- Listed weight: 265 lb (120 kg)

Career information
- High school: John Marshall
- College: Texas A&M
- NFL draft: 2001: 7th round, 226th overall pick

Career history
- 2001–2002: Atlanta Falcons
- 2002: New Orleans Saints*
- 2002: Atlanta Falcons
- 2004: Miami Dolphins
- 2005: Seattle Seahawks*
- 2006–2007: Toronto Argonauts
- 2008: Saskatchewan Roughriders
- 2008–2012: Toronto Argonauts
- * Offseason or practice squad member only

Awards and highlights
- Grey Cup champion (2012)
- Stats at Pro Football Reference
- Stats at CFL.ca (archive)

Ronald L. Flemons (born October 20, 1979) is an American former professional football defensive lineman. He attended John Marshall High School and Texas A&M University. Flemons was selected by the Atlanta Falcons in the seventh round of the 2001 NFL draft. He spent brief stints with several National Football League (NFL) teams before signing on in the Canadian Football League (CFL) in 2006.

== Professional career ==
After being selected by the Atlanta Falcons in the seventh round of the 2001 NFL draft, Flemons dressed for one game that season. In 2002, he briefly joined the New Orleans Saints before returning to Atlanta and appearing in four games. He did not make the regular season squad for Atlanta in 2003, and he signed with the Miami Dolphins the following year, playing in one game. He was traded to the Seattle Seahawks in 2005, but he was placed on waivers before making an appearance.

Flemons was signed as a free agent with the Toronto Argonauts on January 6, 2006, and released as a final training camp cut on June 10 but returned in Week 5, making his CFL regular season debut dressing as backup defensive end and playing special teams. He was traded to the Saskatchewan Roughriders on March 5, 2008, along with Glenn January, Toronto's first round selection in the 2008 CFL draft and Toronto's second round selection in the 2010 CFL draft in exchange for Kerry Joseph and Saskatchewan's third round pick in the 2010 Canadian Draft. On July 7, 2008, Flemons was traded back to the Argonauts along with a 5th round pick in the 2011 Canadian College Draft for receiver T. J. Acree, the rights to Brian Smith, and a 3rd round pick in the 2011 draft.

On January 25, 2013, Flemons was released by the Argonauts.
