= Steve Schmidt (Canadian football) =

Canadian football player (born 1984)

No. 0
- Position: Fullback/long snapper

Personal information
- Born: July 17, 1984 (age 42); Winnipeg, Manitoba
- Listed height: 6 ft 4 in (1.93 m)
- Listed weight: 256 lb (116 kg)

Career information
- High school: North Vancouver (BC) Carson Graham
- College: San Diego State
- CFL draft: 2008: 4th round, 30th overall pick

Career history
- Toronto Argonauts (2008–2009); Hamilton Tiger-Cats (2010)
- Stats at CFL.ca (archive)

Steve Schmidt (born July 17, 1984) is former Canadian football fullback and long snapper. He last played for the Hamilton Tiger-Cats of the Canadian Football League. He was drafted in the fourth round of the 2008 CFL draft by the Toronto Argonauts. He played college football at San Diego State.

On May 5, 2010, the Argonauts traded Schmidt to the Tiger-Cats in exchange for a conditional draft pick in the 2012 CFL draft.
