= Mark Dewit =

Profile
- Position: Centre

Personal information
- Born: November 3, 1986 (age 40); Calgary, Alberta, Canada
- Listed height: 6 ft 3 in (1.91 m)
- Listed weight: 305 lb (138 kg)

Career information
- High school: Calgary (AB) Bishop Carroll
- University: Calgary
- CFL draft: 2008: 6th round, 42nd overall pick

Career history
- Toronto Argonauts (2008–2009); Hamilton Tiger-Cats (2010–2011); Calgary Stampeders (2012); Winnipeg Blue Bombers (2013)
- Stats at CFL.ca (archive)

Mark Dewit (November 3, 1986) is a Canadian former professional football centre who played in the Canadian Football League (CFL). He was drafted 42nd overall by the Toronto Argonauts in the 2008 CFL draft. Dewit played CIS football for the Calgary Dinos.

== Early life ==
Dewit began playing football while attending Bishop Carroll High School (Calgary, Alberta) in Calgary, Alberta. In 2005 he enrolled at the University of Calgary and continued his football career by playing three years of CIS football for the Calgary Dinos as defensive lineman for his first year and then moved to the offensive line. He was a Canada West All-Star in 2007 and won the CIS wrestling championship in his weight class(130). He was eligible to be drafted into the CFL in his fourth year of university.

== Professional career ==
Dewit was drafted in the sixth round of the 2008 CFL draft by the Toronto Argonauts. He played for two seasons for Toronto, before being released by the Argonauts on June 22, 2010. On June 26, 2010 he signed as a free agent with the Hamilton Tiger-Cats, and played for them for two seasons. On January 3, 2012, Dewit was traded to the Calgary Stampeders along with Kevin Glenn and a conditional draft pick for Henry Burris. On February 15, 2013 Dewit signed with the Winnipeg Blue Bombers as a free-agent.
