= Jean-Nicolas Carrière =

Canadian football player (born 1985)

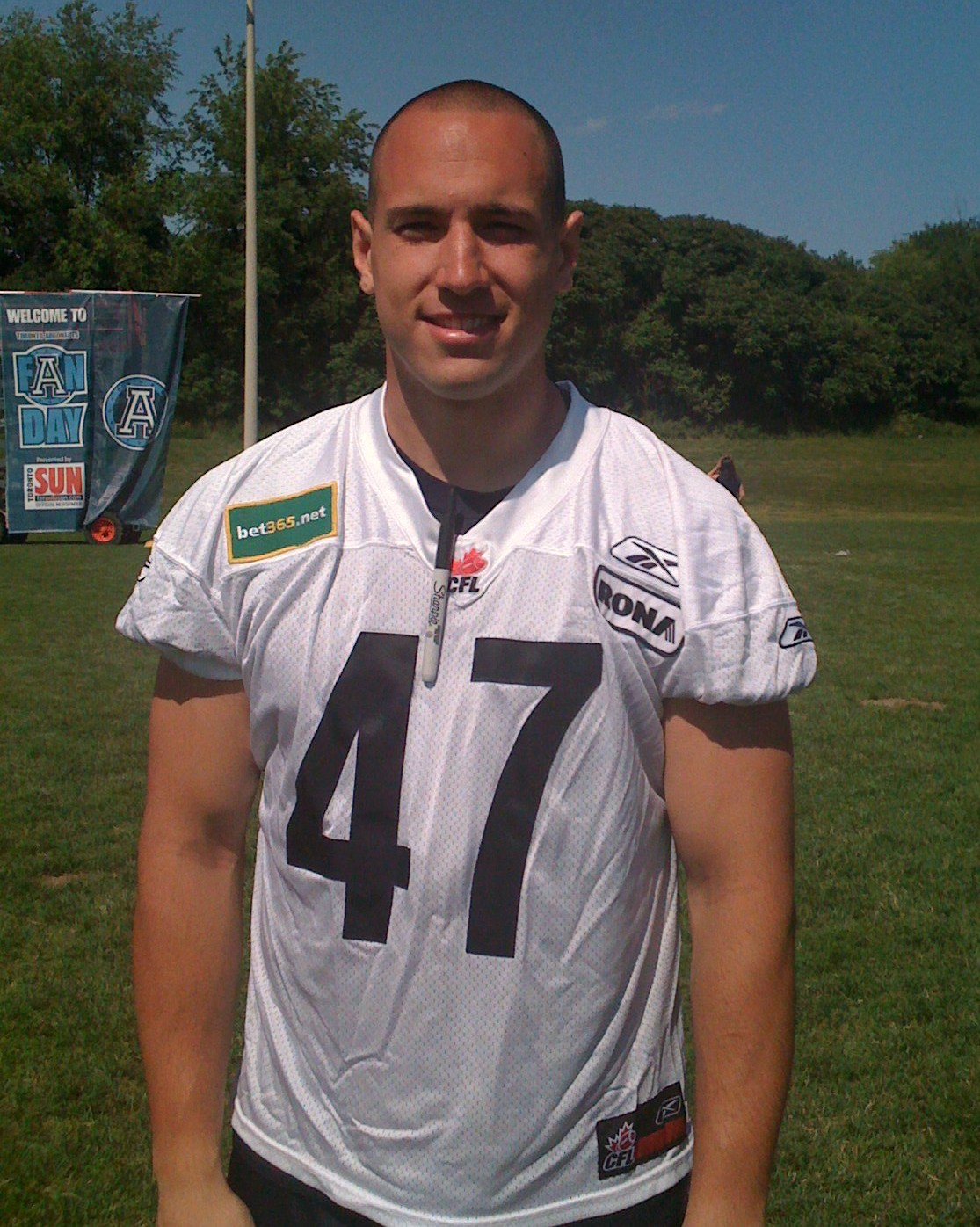

Profile
- Position: Linebacker

Personal information
- Born: October 3, 1985 (age 41); Rockland, Ontario, Canada
- Listed height: 6 ft 1 in (1.85 m)
- Listed weight: 222 lb (101 kg)

Career information
- College: McGill
- CFL draft: 2008: 3rd round, 21st overall pick

Career history
- Toronto Argonauts (2008–2009)
- Stats at CFL.ca (archive)

Jean-Nicolas Carrière (born October 3, 1985) is a Canadian former professional football linebacker in the Canadian Football League. He was drafted in the third round with the 21st overall pick in the 2008 CFL draft by the Toronto Argonauts and played the 2008 CFL season for them.

On July 9, 2009, Carrière was released by the Argonauts.

Carrière played CIS Football for the McGill Redmen.
