= Tyler Scott (Canadian football) =

Canadian football player (born 1985)

No. 15, 80
- Position: Wide receiver

Personal information
- Born: September 21, 1985 (age 41); Windsor, Ontario, Canada
- Listed height: 6 ft 2 in (1.88 m)
- Listed weight: 205 lb (93 kg)

Career information
- High school: Holy Names
- University: Western Ontario
- CFL draft: 2008: 6th round, 44th overall pick

Career history
- 2008–2009: Toronto Argonauts
- 2010–2012: Edmonton Eskimos

Tyler Scott (born September 21, 1985) is a Canadian former professional football wide receiver who played in the Canadian Football League (CFL) for the Toronto Argonauts and Edmonton Eskimos. He attended the University of Western Ontario as a geography major with an intention to pursue teaching. He was drafted in the 2008 CFL draft by the Argonauts.

== Professional career ==
Scott's first game in the CFL was a pre-season game against the Montreal Alouettes on June 12, 2008, where he had two receptions for 20 yards for the Argonauts. Assistant General Manager Greg Mohns was impressed with his dedication, size, and movement. "He studied the playbook and he has not made a lot of mental mistakes," Mohns said following the first game. "He has a chance to make the final roster."

On May 27, 2010, Scott was released by the Toronto Argonauts. Scott was picked up by the Edmonton Eskimos on July 27, 2010, signing a two-year deal.

On June 8, 2012, during training camp, Scott collided with defensive back Rico Murray and was hospitalized. Scott was placed on the 9-game injured list.
