= Taylor Robertson =

Canadian gridiron football player (born 1980)

No. 65
- Position: Guard

Personal information
- Born: September 8, 1980 (age 46); Brantford, Ontario, Canada
- Listed height: 6 ft 6 in (1.98 m)
- Listed weight: 320 lb (145 kg)

Career information
- High school: La Salle
- College: UCF
- CFL draft: 2003: 2nd round, 11th overall pick

Career history
- 2003: Philadelphia Eagles*
- 2003–2006: Calgary Stampeders
- 2007–2011: Toronto Argonauts
- * Offseason or practice squad member only

Awards and highlights
- CFL East All-Star (2007)
- Stats at CFL.ca

Taylor Robertson (born September 8, 1980) is a Canadian former professional football player who was an offensive guard in the National Football League (NFL) and Canadian Football League (CFL). He played college football for the UCF Knights and was selected in the second round of the 2003 CFL draft by the Calgary Stampeders. Robertson was also a member of the CFL's Toronto Argonauts and NFL's Philadelphia Eagles.

Robertson has also been a pit crew member for Fitzpatrick Motorsports in the NASCAR Canadian Tire Series.

== College football ==
Robertson started his 4-year college football career on full athletic scholarship at the University of Central Florida (UCF) of the NCAA in January 1999. Playing immediately as a true freshman after making the transition from tight end to guard during spring and fall camp, he saw action in all 22 games his first two seasons as a backup. Robertson became a starter his junior year at guard and by the end of his senior season, he was arguably the Golden Knights' best run blocker and was named second-team All-MAC.

== Pro football ==
Robertson first started his professional career in the NFL with the Philadelphia Eagles. Following his release from the Eagles, he made his way to the CFL where he was drafted 11th overall by the Calgary Stampeders. Robertson played his first four years in the CFL with the Stamps before being traded to the Toronto Argonauts where he played five more seasons until his retirement in 2012.

During his 9-year CFL career, Robertson was named CFL Division All-Star (2007) and team nominee for CFL Most Outstanding Lineman 3 years in a row (2007 to 2009). In addition, Robertson was also part of an offensive line in 2006 that won the CFL award for fewest sacks allowed, while also being named CFL lineman of the week during that same season. During Robertson's CFL career he started 137 regular season and playoff games at right guard, more notable starting 128 of those consecutively without missing a single play.

== NASCAR ==
In 2012 following his retirement from the CFL, Robertson joined Fitzpatrick Motorsports as a pit crew member and handled the duties of both Jackman and Gas Man for the #84 Equipment Express Chevrolet, driven by J. R. Fitzpatrick in the NASCAR Canadian Tire Series.

== Philanthropy ==
While becoming a professional athlete, Robertson has been involved in numerous community programs, including visits to children’s hospitals, speaking at youth jails and rehabilitation centres in the U.S. and Canada, and speaking with thousands of kids throughout the GTA with an anti-bullying program. A lot of his time in the community has been spent being an advocate for breast cancer awareness. Through his professional career, Robertson has formed partnerships between numerous CFL teams and national cancer charitable organizations, as well as playing an intricate role in bringing ‘Pink’ to the CFL. He is also the founder of Life on the Line, a non-profit organization that aims to heighten Canadians' awareness about breast cancer, and raise funds to support breast cancer research, help those battling the disease, and celebrate survivors and their families. Robertson launched this initiative after losing his mother to breast cancer when he was just 7 years old.
