= Willie Pile =

American football player (born 1980)

No. 35, 20
- Positions: Safety, linebacker

Personal information
- Born: May 25, 1980 (age 46); New York, New York, U.S.
- Listed height: 6 ft 2 in (1.88 m)
- Listed weight: 206 lb (93 kg)

Career information
- High school: West Potomac (Alexandria, Virginia)
- College: Virginia Tech (1998–2002)
- NFL draft: 2003: 7th round, 252nd overall pick

Career history
- Kansas City Chiefs (2003–2004); → Amsterdam Admirals (2004); Dallas Cowboys (2005); Toronto Argonauts (2007–2011)

Awards and highlights
- Second-team All-Big East (2002); CFL East All-Star (2010)
- Stats at Pro Football Reference

Willie Marquis Pile (born May 25, 1980) is an American former professional football player who was a safety who played for the Kansas City Chiefs and Dallas Cowboys of the National Football League (NFL), and the Toronto Argonauts of the Canadian Football League (CFL). He played college football for the Virginia Tech Hokies.

== Early life ==
Pile attended West Potomac High School in Alexandria, Virginia. He didn't start playing football until his freshman year. He played at quarterback, defensive back and wide receiver.

As a senior quarterback, he registered 652 rushing yards, 560 passing yards, 9 rushing touchdowns and 4 passing touchdowns. He helped his team post an 11–2 record and reach the Division 5 Northern Region championship. As a two-way player, he also contributed at defensive back with 96 tackles, 8 interceptions (school record) and 4 fumble recoveries. He received first-team Group AAA all-state honors on defense, besides being named All-Metro by The Washington Post and Northern Region Offensive Player of the Year.

He also lettered in basketball, where he received All-district and All Region Tournament honors.

== College career ==
Pile became a starter at free safety as a sophomore, registering 56 tackles and 6 interceptions. The next year, he made 94 tackles (second on the team), 4 interceptions and 2 fumble recoveries.

In 2002, in his senior season he tallied 105 tackles, 5 PKD, 4 interceptions, 2 forced fumbles and 2 fumble recoveries. While playing against the Miami Hurricanes, Pile intercepted a halfback pass from Jarrett Payton intended for Ken Dorsey and returned it 97 yards for a touchdown. The interception would come while Tech was trailing 49-21 and sparked a rally that ultimately fell short as the Hokies lost 56–45. A three-year starter at free safety for the Virginia Tech Hokies, he finished his career with 267 tackles, 14 interceptions and 276 return yards.

== Professional career ==
=== Kansas City Chiefs ===
Pile was selected by the Kansas City Chiefs in the seventh round (252nd overall) of the 2003 NFL draft. He was waived on August 31 and was eventually re-signed to the practice squad in week 14. In 2004, he was allocated to the Amsterdam Admirals of NFL Europe, where he had 53 tackles (third on the team), 6 passes defensed and one interception.

In 2004, he started 5 games in place of strong safety Greg Wesley who was dealing with a hamstring injury. He appeared in 16 games, making 36 tackles, 5 special teams tackles and 2 passes defensed. He was released on August 30, 2005.

=== Dallas Cowboys ===
On September 5, 2005, he was signed as a free agent by the Dallas Cowboys. He was a backup behind Roy Williams and Keith Davis, playing mostly as a nickel safety and special teams player. He appeared in 16 games and posted 22 defensive tackles. On September 2, 2006, he was released after being passed on the depth chart by rookie Pat Watkins.

=== Toronto Argonauts ===
On February 23, 2007, Pile signed with the Toronto Argonauts of the Canadian Football League and was switched to outside linebacker. He played in 17 games during the 2007 season, registering 76 tackles (third on the team) and 5 sacks. In 2008, he was named the team's top defensive player after leading the defense with 75 tackles, while also adding three interceptions, 2 sacks through 17 games.

He was re-signed by the Argonauts on February 16, 2009. In 2009, he played his first full season, amassing 81 tackles, 3 interceptions and one sack. The next year, he received East All-Stars honors, after setting a career-high of 83 tackles, 4 interceptions, 2 sacks, 3 passes defensed, 4 special teams tackles, 2 forced fumbles and 2 fumble recoveries.

On May 29, 2012, Pile announced his retirement from professional football, finishing his CFL career 445 tackles, 12 interceptions, 13 forced fumbles and 5 fumble recoveries.
