= Adrian Mayes =

American football player (born 1980)

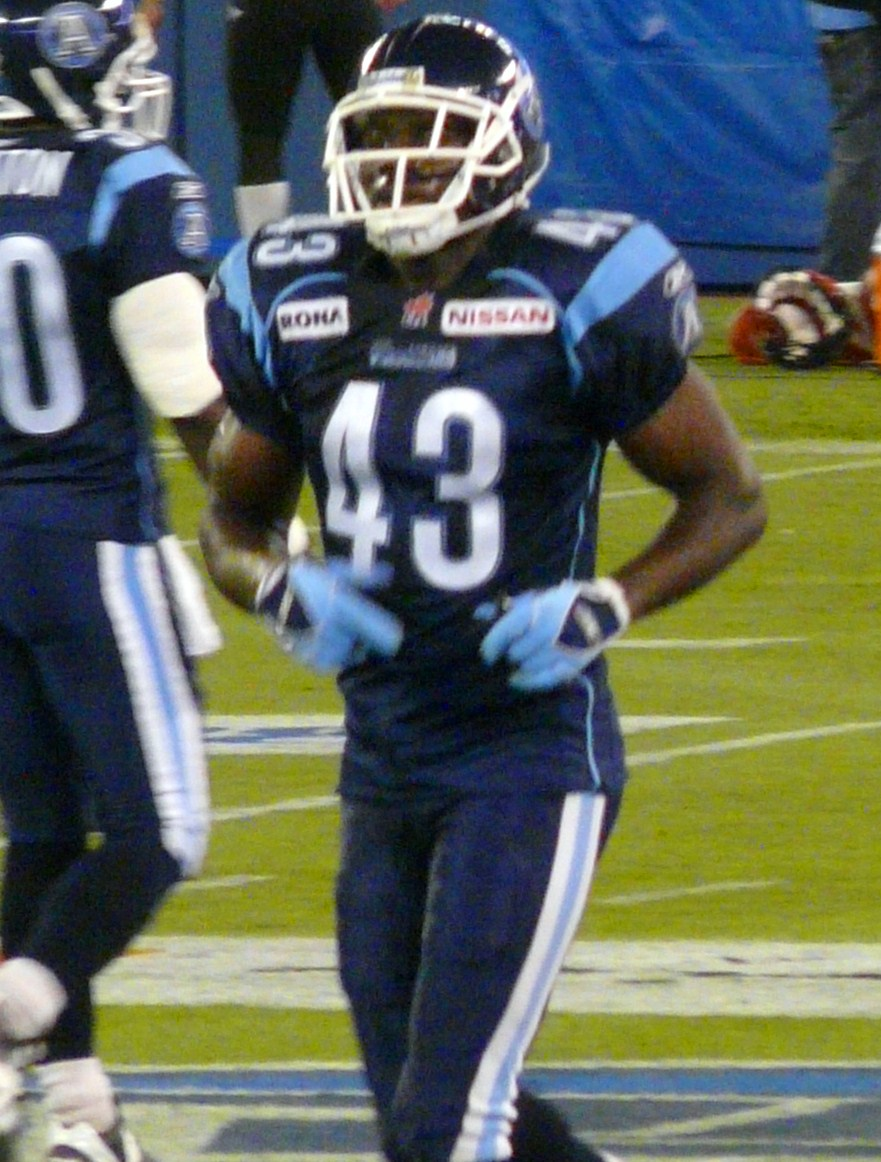

Profile
- Position: Linebacker

Personal information
- Born: November 17, 1980 (age 45); Houston, Texas, U.S.
- Listed height: 6 ft 1 in (1.85 m)
- Listed weight: 200 lb (91 kg)

Career information
- High school: Forest Brook (Houston)
- College: LSU

Career history
- Berlin Thunder (2004); Arizona Cardinals (2004–2005); New York Giants (2006)*; Columbus Destroyers (2006–2007); Toronto Argonauts (2007–2008)
- * Offseason or practice squad member only

Awards and highlights
- BCS national champion (2003)

Career CFL statistics
- Total tackles: 3
- Stats at Pro Football Reference
- Stats at CFL.ca

Adrian Anthony Mayes (born November 17, 1980) is an American former professional football player who was a linebacker in the National Football League (NFL) and Canadian Football League (CFL). He played college football for the LSU Tigers.

== Early life ==
Mayes was born in Houston, Texas, where he attended Forest Brook High School.

== Playing career ==
=== College career ===
Mayes played college football as a linebacker and safety at Louisiana State University from 2000 to 2003.

=== Professional career ===
Mayes played in the NFL with the Arizona Cardinals, in NFL Europe with the Berlin Thunder, in the Arena Football League with the Columbus Destroyers and in the CFL with the Toronto Argonauts.
