= Randy Srochenski =

Canadian football player (born 1973)

Profile
- Positions: Long snapper, Linebacker

Personal information
- Born: January 15, 1973 (age 53); Regina, Saskatchewan, Canada
- Listed height: 6 ft 2 in (1.88 m)
- Listed weight: 218 lb (99 kg)

Career information
- College: Regina Rams

Career history
- 1994: Saskatchewan Roughriders
- 1996–2001: Saskatchewan Roughriders
- 2002–2009: Toronto Argonauts

Awards and highlights
- 92nd Grey Cup winner
- Stats at CFL.ca

Randy Srochenski (born January 15, 1973, in Regina, Saskatchewan) is a former Canadian Football League long snapper. He is also a full-time minister serving as Pastor at United Niagara in St. Catharines, Ontario area.

Srochenski attended Archbishop M.C. O'Neill High School in Regina and played for the Regina Rams of the Canadian Junior Football League winning the Canadian Bowl in 1994 and named the most outstanding defensive player of the Canadian Bowl in 1993, 1994, and 1995.

== Professional career ==
In 1994, Srochenski signed as a free agent with the Saskatchewan Roughriders and split his time between the 'Riders and the Rams, playing five games on special teams for Saskatchewan. He was released during training camp of the 1995 CFL season and returned to the Rams. For the 1996 CFL season, he re-signed with the Roughriders, played 10 games then finished the year on the practice roster. From the 1997 CFL season on, he has remained on the active roster and, since 2002, has played for the Toronto Argonauts, primarily as a long snapper.

Considered one of the best long snappers in football, Srochenski first retired after the 2007 CFL season but was lured back by the Argos for the 2008 Toronto Argonauts season. He retired again after the conclusion of the season only to be re-signed once more on the eve of the 2009 Argos regular season when the Argos again struggled to find a dependable long snapper to replace the 15-year veteran.
