= Kenny Heatly =

American gridiron football player (born 1982)

Profile
- Position: Cornerback

Personal information
- Born: March 28, 1982 (age 44); St. Petersburg, Florida
- Listed height: 5 ft 11 in (1.80 m)
- Listed weight: 176 lb (80 kg)

Career information
- College: Bethune-Cookman
- NFL draft: 2004: undrafted

Career history
- Detroit Lions (2004)*; Toronto Argonauts (2006–2008)
- * Offseason or practice squad member only
- Stats at CFL.ca (archive)

Kenny Heatly (born March 28, 1982) is a former American and Canadian football cornerback. He was signed as an undrafted free agent by the Detroit Lions in 2004. He played college football at Bethune-Cookman.

Heatly also played for the Toronto Argonauts.
