= Raymond Fontaine =

Canadian football player (born 1980)

Profile
- Position: Linebacker

Personal information
- Born: September 1, 1980 (age 46); Ottawa, Ontario, Canada
- Listed height: 6 ft 4 in (1.93 m)
- Listed weight: 220 lb (100 kg)

Career information
- College: Kentucky
- CFL draft: 2005: 2nd round, 11th overall pick

Career history
- 2006–2010: Toronto Argonauts
- 2010: Montreal Alouettes

Awards and highlights
- Grey Cup champion (2010)
- Stats at CFL.ca (archive)

Raymond Fontaine is a Canadian former professional football linebacker. He was drafted by the Argonauts in the second round of the 2005 CFL draft. He played college football for the Kentucky Wildcats.

== Early life ==
Fontaine was born on September 1, 1980, in Ottawa, Ontario. For eight years he played junior football with the Myers Riders.

== College career ==
As a true freshman at Kentucky, Fontaine was redshirted. In 2002, as a redshirt freshman, Fontaine played in all of Kentucky's 12 games while playing defensive end. He recorded nine tackles. Fontaine played in 11 games as a sophomore in 2003 recording 33 tackles. He recorded a career-high six tackles against Louisville and Ohio. During his junior season in 2004 at Kentucky, Fontaine played in 11 games and started three at linebacker. For the second straight season he recorded 33 tackles and added one sack. As a senior in 2005, he played in 11 games, recording 19 tackles. Fontaine also added two blocked kicks for the first time in his career.

== Professional career ==
=== Toronto Argonauts ===
Fontaine was drafted by the Toronto Argonauts in the second round of the 2005 CFL draft but re-joined Kentucky for his senior season. He signed with Toronto on May 17, 2006. As a rookie, Fontaine played in all 18 games and made appearances at special teams and linebacker. He led the Argonauts and was second in the CFL in special teams tackles with 23. In his debut on July 6, 2006, he dressed as the backup linebacker and made appearances on special teams. He recorded his first defensive tackle in week 6, where he was in the game in third down and goal line situations. Against Calgary he led all players with three tackles. During the 2006 playoffs he appeared mainly on special teams, recording two tackles in the East Championship game against the Montreal Alouettes. After the season, he was named the Argonauts rookie of the year.

In 2007, Fontaine played in 16 of 18 games for Toronto, mainly as a backup defensive end and special teams. He finished second on the team in special teams tackles with 18. Although he was transferred from linebacker to defensive end during training camp he appeared at middle linebacker in place of Mike O'Shea in week 6 against Winnipeg. In week 17 at Winnipeg he arguably had his best special teams game recording, a blocked punt and a forced fumble both returned for touchdowns. After his performance he was named CFL Special Teams Player of the Week.

Fontaine recorded his stat of 2008 in week 2 against the Hamilton Tiger-Cats, getting one special teams tackle. In week 6 against Saskatchewan, Fontaine recorded one big tackle in the open field, and then against Hamilton in week 7 he recorded two special teams tackles. He recorded his first defensive tackle of the season in week 8.

On September 1, 2010, Fontaine was released by the Argonauts.

=== Montreal Alouettes ===
Fontaine was later signed with the Montreal Alouettes during that same season, culminating in a win in the 98th Grey Cup.
