= Chuck Winters =

American gridiron football player and coach (born 1974)

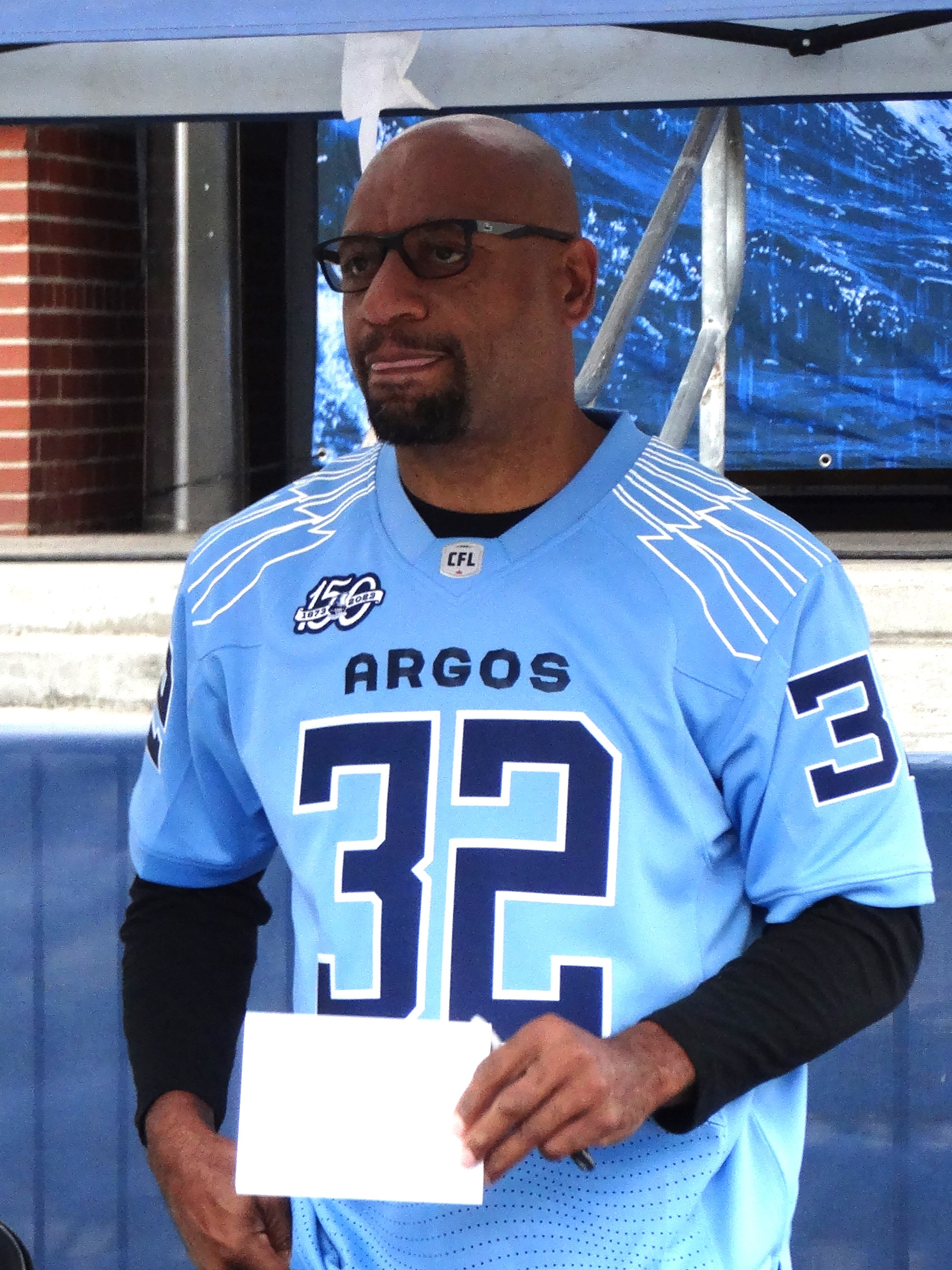
- Winters in 2023

No. 32
- Position: Linebacker

Personal information
- Born: February 7, 1974 (age 52); Detroit, Michigan, U.S.
- Listed height: 6 ft 0 in (1.83 m)
- Listed weight: 200 lb (91 kg)

Career information
- High school: Saint Martin de Porres (Detroit)
- College: Michigan
- NFL draft: 1997: undrafted

Career history

Playing
- Detroit Fury (2001–2002); Las Vegas Gladiators (2003); Toronto Argonauts (2003–2008)

Coaching
- Hamilton Tiger-Cats (2016) Defensive assistant and special teams assistant; Hamilton Tiger-Cats (2022) Strength and conditioning coach

Awards and highlights
- Grey Cup champion (2004)

Career CFL statistics
- Tackles: 179
- Sacks: 7
- Interceptions: 2
- Stats at CFL.ca (archived)

Career AFL statistics
- Tackles: 79
- Interceptions: 1
- Receptions-yards: 79-938
- Kick return yards: 1,278
- Total touchdowns: 16
- Stats at ArenaFan.com

Charles Winters (born February 7, 1974) is an American former professional football linebacker and defensive back who played in the Canadian Football League (CFL) and Arena Football League (AFL).

== Early life ==
Winters grew up in the tough Herman Gardens project of Detroit, Michigan. When he was in middle school, gang violence began permeating the projects. For many, adolescence is one's search for acceptance. Like his head coach and many of his teammates, Winters sought acceptance in organized sports such as baseball and football rather than joining violent street gangs. Although he escaped the vicious cycle of violence himself, his 19-year-old brother Malik was murdered in a drive-by shooting in 1998.

Winters hails from Detroit's St. Martin de Porres High School (closed 2005) where he won the MHSAA State Class C Football Title twice. While at St. Martin de Porres, Winters was an All-American in two sports football and baseball. Also, Winters was drafted in the tenth round in the 1992 amateur baseball draft by the Kansas City Royals. SMDP is the same school that produced fellow CFL player Kevin Glenn and former National Football League player Troy Kyles of the New York Giants.

== College career ==
During his college football years, Winters was a standout player at the University of Michigan from 1992–1996 in football and baseball. At the end of his college career he was drafted once again in the twentieth round by the Kansas City Royals. After leaving the game of football for a brief period of time, he spent several years playing in the Arena Football League with the Detroit Fury and Las Vegas Gladiators.

== Professional career ==
Winters retired from the Toronto Argonauts on December 19, 2008, after six years as a linebacker and defensive back. During his time with the Argonauts, he appeared in 82 regular-season games and eight playoff contests and was a member of the Argonauts' 2004 Grey Cup-winning team. In the 2007 season, he posted a career-high 38 tackles and led the team with six forced fumbles.

== Coaching career ==
Winters spent the 2016 season with the Hamilton Tiger-Cats as a defensive and special teams assistant. He was hired back by the team six years later to serve as their strength and conditioning coach in 2022
