= Byron Parker =

American gridiron football player (born 1981)

Profile
- Position: Cornerback

Personal information
- Born: March 7, 1981 (age 45); Madisonville, Kentucky, U.S.
- Listed height: 6 ft 0 in (1.83 m)
- Listed weight: 193 lb (88 kg)

Career information
- College: Tulane

Career history
- 2004: Jacksonville Jaguars*
- 2005: Toronto Argonauts
- 2006: Dallas Cowboys*
- 2006–2008: Toronto Argonauts
- 2009: Philadelphia Eagles*
- 2009: Toronto Argonauts
- 2009: Edmonton Eskimos
- 2010–2011: Toronto Argonauts
- 2012: BC Lions
- 2013: Montreal Alouettes
- * Offseason or practice squad member only

Awards and highlights
- 3× CFL All-Star (2006, 2007, 2011); 3× CFL East All-Star (2006, 2007, 2011)
- Stats at CFL.ca (archive)

Byron Wesley Parker (born March 7, 1981) is a former gridiron football cornerback. He was signed by the Jacksonville Jaguars as an undrafted free agent in 2004. He played college football and college basketball at Tulane.

Parker was also a member of the Montreal Alouettes, BC Lions, Toronto Argonauts, Edmonton Eskimos, Dallas Cowboys, and Philadelphia Eagles.

== College career ==
Parker initially enrolled in Tulane on a college basketball scholarship and played on their team from 2001 to 2003. It was also in 2003 that Parker won the NCAA slam dunk competition. Winning the slam dunk competition drew the attention of Tulane's football head coach Chris Scelfo, as well as football scouts in the NFL. Later that same year, his senior year, Parker accepted Scelfo's invitation to play on the school's football team. His slam dunking abilities were showcased in a 2005 CFL game at Molson Stadium against the Montreal Alouettes. Lined up as a wide receiver, Parker caught a 42-yard touchdown reception and celebrated by dunking the ball over the cross bar uprights. He also has a 43" vertical leap.

== Professional career ==
=== Jacksonville Jaguars ===
On April 26, 2004, Parker was signed as an undrafted free agent by the Jacksonville Jaguars. He was waived by the team following training camp on August 1.

=== Toronto Argonauts ===
After being cut by the Jaguars during training camp, Parker signed with the Argonauts on January 24, 2005, but played in only six games.

=== Dallas Cowboys ===
In 2006, Parker signed a one-year contract with the Dallas Cowboys of the NFL but was cut by the team on July 31.

=== Toronto Argonauts (II) ===
Parker re-joined the Argonauts a week after being released by Dallas. Upon his return, he became their starting cornerback. On October 14, 2006, Parker broke a CFL record for most interception return yardage in a single season with a 75-yard interception return for a touchdown in Edmonton. He ended the season with a CFL record 348 interception return yards, surpassing Eric Carter's 2003 record of 300 yards. Parker was selected as a CFL All-Star in 2006 and 2007.

=== Philadelphia Eagles ===
On January 27, 2009, Parker was reported to have signed a reserve/future contract with the Philadelphia Eagles. The signing was officially confirmed by the Eagles on February 3, 2009. He was waived on August 14, thereby creating a roster spot for the signing of quarterback Michael Vick.

=== Toronto Argonauts (III) ===
After his release from the Eagles, Parker returned to Toronto as the Argonauts deferred his contract when he signed with Philadelphia. The Eagles had him on a weight gain program and he bulked from his 2008 CFL weight of 193 to 227 and he found he had to re-adjust to the Canadian game; reducing his weight to 210 by the time he reported to practice on August 20, 2009, but still finding himself tired out by the longer, wider field. Parker reported that the Eagles offered him another opportunity to return on August 20 but he refused, feeling more comfortable with the Argonauts.

=== Edmonton Eskimos ===
Parker was traded to the Edmonton Eskimos on September 28, 2009, for future considerations.

=== Toronto Argonauts (IV) ===
On February 16, 2010, Parker re-signed with the Argonauts as a free agent.

On October 28, 2011, Parker scored his 9th career interception return for a touchdown against the Winnipeg Blue Bombers at Canad Inns Stadium, setting a new CFL record.

=== BC Lions ===
Parker entered free agency on February 15, 2012, and was signed by the BC Lions on February 16, 2012. Parker played one season with the BC Lions. On January 18, 2013, Parker was released by the BC Lions.

=== Montreal Alouettes ===
Two days following his release by the Lions, Parker signed with the Montreal Alouettes for a contract worth one year plus an option. On January 30, 2014, Parker was released from the Alouettes.

On July 11, 2014, Parker signed a 1-day contract to retire with Toronto Argonauts.
