= Jeff Johnson (Canadian football) =

Canadian football player (born 1977)

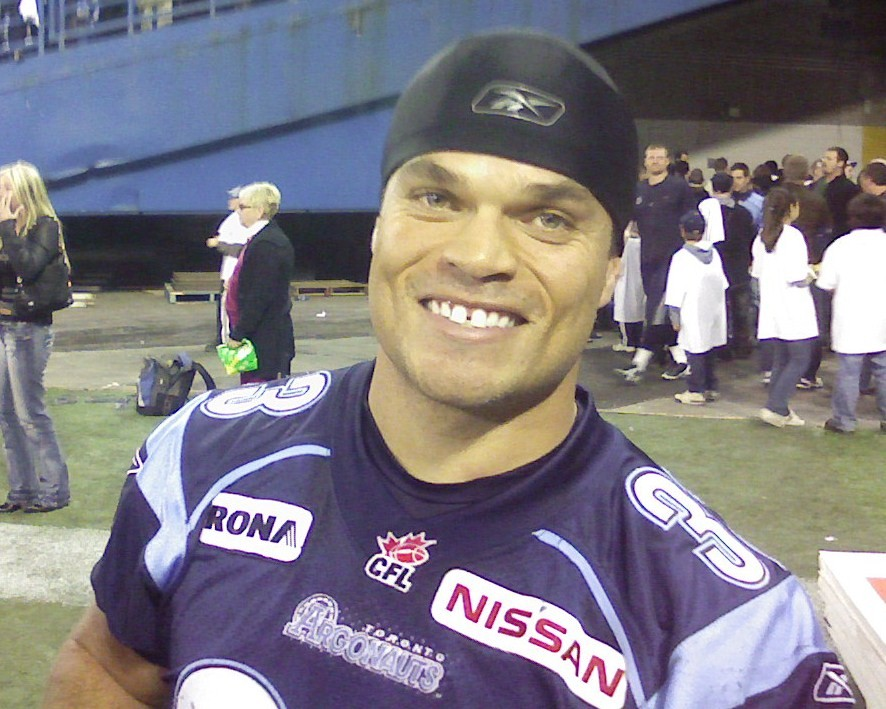
- Johnson with the Toronto Argonauts in 2008

No. 33
- Position: Running back

Personal information
- Born: February 28, 1977 (age 49); Toronto, Ontario, Canada
- Listed height: 5 ft 9 in (1.75 m)
- Listed weight: 206 lb (93 kg)

Career information
- University: York University
- CFL draft: 2000: undrafted

Career history
- 2000–2001: Hamilton Tiger-Cats
- 2002–2013: Toronto Argonauts

Awards and highlights
- 2× Grey Cup champion (2004, 2012); CIS’s Outstanding Rookie (1996)
- Stats at CFL.ca

Jeff Johnson (born February 28, 1977) is a Canadian former professional football running back who played for the Hamilton Tiger-Cats and Toronto Argonauts of the Canadian Football League (CFL).

== Early life ==
In high-school, Johnson played at the Etobicoke Collegiate Institute, one of Toronto's oldest high-schools, located in Etobicoke. He first played football in Grade 12 when he was asked to try out for the football team. Playing tailback, Johnson led the Etobicoke Rams in offensive, and special teams yards throughout his two football seasons. In his final year at E.C.I. Johnson won the athlete of the year award and to this day holds the Ram's record for most total touchdowns scored throughout high-school.

After high school, Johnson starred at York University in Toronto from 1996 to 1999. He was named the CIAU’s outstanding rookie in 1996 and an Ontario University Athletics First-Team All-Star in 1996, 1997, and 1999. He was a CIAU Second-Team All-Canadian in 1997 and 1999. In his final year at York, Johnson had 173 carries for 977 yards with five rushing touchdowns, 11 receptions for 133 yards and one touchdown, and 196 yards on 11 kickoff returns. Over his four-year York Lions (York Yeomen at the time) career, Johnson had a total of 553 carries for 3,365 yards with 18 touchdowns rushing, 37 pass receptions for 436 yards with two touchdowns, and 28 kickoff returns for 776 yards and one touchdown.

In 2017 he was inducted into the [York University Sport Hall of Fame at the Dinner and Induction Ceremony, September 22, 2017. Fellow inductees included Peter Bedard (Tennis), Melanie Roach (Hockey), Greg Rolston (Hockey), Frank Cosentino (Football Coach and York University Administrator) and Patricia Murray (Coach Badminton and Swimming and York University Administrator).

Jeff Johnson (BA '00) is one of the most decorated football players at York. He burst onto the scene in 1996, winning the Peter Gorman Trophy as CIS rookie of the year to become the first national major award winner in program history, and the Norm Marshall Trophy as OUA rookie of the year. He was honoured throughout his career at the conference and national levels, earning three OUA first-team all-star selections (1996, 1997, 1999) and two CIS second-team all-Canadian awards (1997, 1999). He holds the York record for most career rushing yards (3,358) and carries (553) and ranks third in yards per carry (6.1). Johnson signed with the Hamilton Tiger-Cats as an undrafted free agent in 2000 and went on to a 14-year career in the CFL, spending two seasons in Hamilton and 12 in Toronto and winning a pair of Grey Cups with the Argonauts in 2004 and 2012.

== Professional career ==
=== Hamilton Tiger-Cats ===
Johnson went undrafted in the 2000 CFL draft but was signed as free agent by the Hamilton Tiger-Cats on June 12, 2000.

=== Toronto Argonauts ===
On February 22, 2002, Johnson signed with the Toronto Argonauts as a free agent. On December 20, 2013, following his 14th season in the CFL, Johnson announced his retirement.

== Sportscasting career ==
From 2014 to 2017, Johnson served as the colour analyst for the Toronto Argonauts radio broadcasts on TSN 1050 alongside play-by-play voice Mike Hogan.
