= Chad Folk =

Canadian gridiron football player (born 1972)

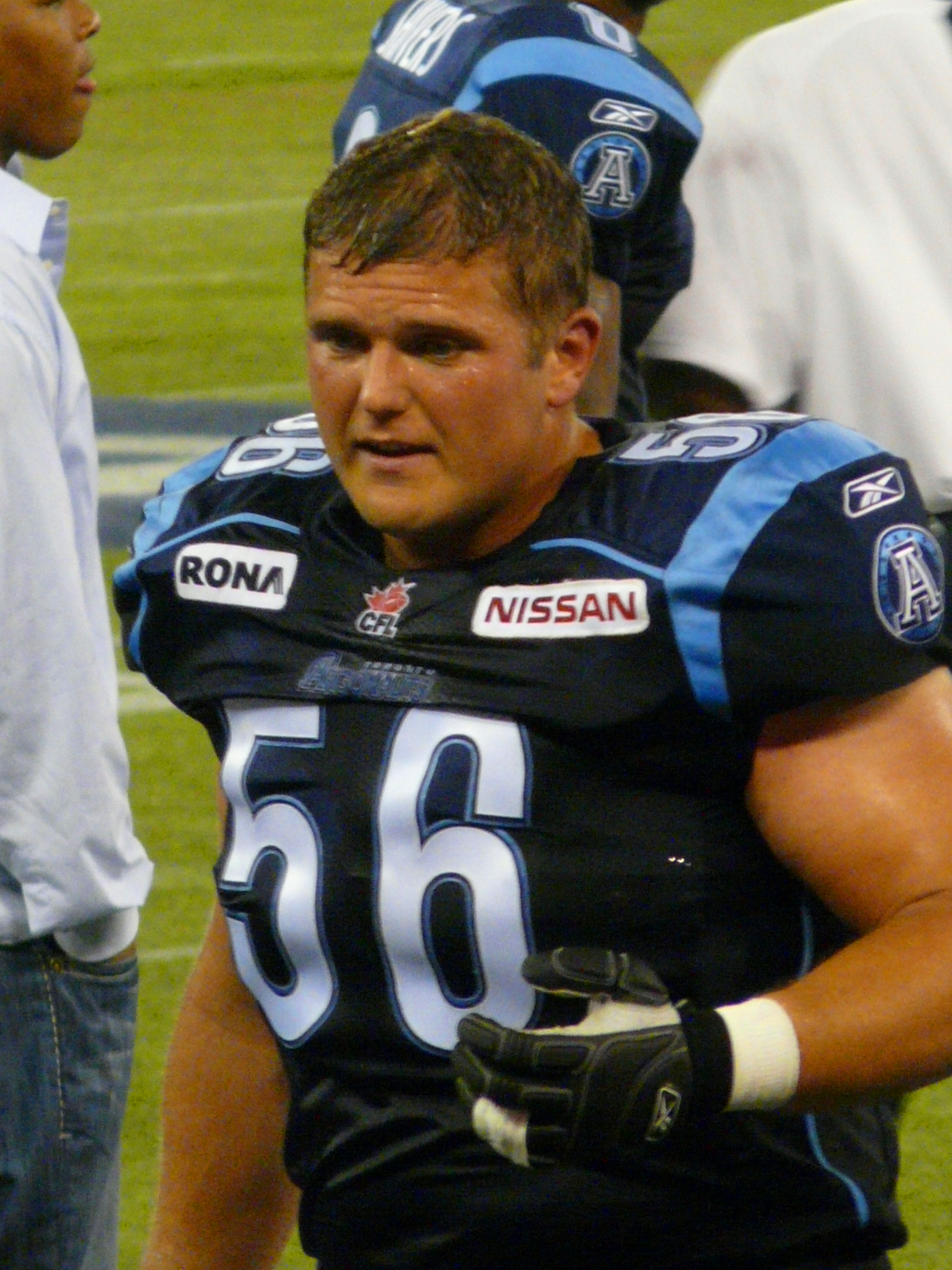
- Folk with the Toronto Argonauts in 2008

No. 56
- Position: Centre

Personal information
- Born: October 28, 1972 (age 54); Kelowna, British Columbia, Canada
- Listed height: 6 ft 0 in (1.83 m)
- Listed weight: 275 lb (125 kg)

Career information
- College: University of Utah
- CFL draft: 1997: 1st round, 1st overall pick

Career history
- 1997–2008: Toronto Argonauts

Awards and highlights
- 2× Grey Cup champion (1997, 2004); 2× Argos Lineman of the Year (1999, 2004)
- Stats at CFL.ca (archive)

Chad Folk (born October 28, 1972) is a Canadian former professional football centre who played for the Toronto Argonauts of the Canadian Football League (CFL). He was the first overall pick in the 1997 CFL draft.

== Junior college years ==
Folk attended Butte College in Oroville, California, and was a two-time team captain and a two-time All-American.

== College career ==
Folk attended the University of Utah and was an elementary education major and a football star. In football, he was a two-time Academic All-American selection and as a senior, he was also named the Team MVP.
