= Jerome Davis (offensive tackle) =

American gridiron football player (born 1974)

No. 92, 76, 75, 59
- Position: Offensive tackle

Personal information
- Born: March 4, 1974 (age 52); Detroit, Michigan, U.S.
- Listed height: 6 ft 5 in (1.96 m)
- Listed weight: 308 lb (140 kg)

Career information
- College: Minnesota
- NFL draft: 1997: undrafted

Career history
- Detroit Lions (1997–1998); → Frankfurt Galaxy (1998); Carolina Panthers (1999)*; Denver Broncos (2000)*; Calgary Stampeders (2000; San Francisco 49ers (2001–2004); →Frankfurt Galaxy (2002); Toronto Argonauts (2005–2006); Hamilton Tiger-Cats (2007); Toronto Argonauts (2007–2008)
- * Offseason or practice squad member only

Awards and highlights
- All-NFL Europe (2002); CFL East All-Star (2006)
- Stats at Pro Football Reference

Jerome Davis (born March 4, 1974) is an American former professional football offensive tackle. He was signed by the Detroit Lions as an undrafted free agent in 1997. He played college football at Minnesota.

Davis was also a member of the Carolina Panthers, Denver Broncos, Calgary Stampeders, San Francisco 49ers, Hamilton Tiger-Cats and Toronto Argonauts.
