= Aaron Wagner =

American gridiron football player (born 1982)

Profile
- Position: Fullback/Linebacker

Personal information
- Born: July 5, 1982 (age 44); Cranbrook, British Columbia, Canada
- Listed height: 6 ft 3 in (1.91 m)
- Listed weight: 245 lb (111 kg)

Career information
- College: BYU
- CFL draft: 2005: 2nd round, 14th overall pick

Career history
- Toronto Argonauts (2006–2008); Saskatchewan Roughriders (2009–2010)
- Stats at CFL.ca (archive)

Aaron Wagner (born July 5, 1982) is a Canadian former professional football fullback/linebacker for the Saskatchewan Roughriders of the Canadian Football League. He was drafted in the second round of the 2005 CFL draft by the Toronto Argonauts. He played college football at BYU and WSU.

== Professional career ==
Pre-draft measurables
| Height | Weight | 40-yard dash | 10-yard split | 20-yard split | 20-yard shuttle | Three-cone drill | Vertical jump | Broad jump | Bench press | Wonderlic |
|---|---|---|---|---|---|---|---|---|---|---|
| 6 ft 1 3/4 in (1.87 m) | 248 lb (112 kg) | 4.78 s | 1.62 s | 2.69 s | 4.03 s | 6.52 s | 36 1/2 in (0.93 m) | 9 ft 8 in (2.95 m) | 31 reps | 27 |
All values from NFL Pro Day

After being drafted by the Toronto Argonauts in the 2005 CFL draft, he opted to return to BYU. He joined Toronto in 2006 after a brief stint with The New York Jets of the National Football League ( NFL ). In Toronto, Wagner started at linebacker for the Argonauts, but mostly played on special teams. It was reported by The Canadian Press on February 15, 2009, that Wagner had been traded to the Saskatchewan Roughriders for

== Fraud ==
On November 10, 2024 Wagner was indicted by a federal grand jury in Salt Lake City on 16 counts of various financial crimes including wire fraud and money laundering. He is accused of defrauding private investors and lenders in restaurant businesses, bringing in more than $40 million. Prosecutors in the case requested he be kept in jail until the case, arguing that his wealth and dual Canadian Citizenship made him a flight risk. The judge opted for house arrest with ankle monitoring. A jury trial is scheduled for November 3, 2025.
