= Chris Hardy =

Canadian football player (born 1972)

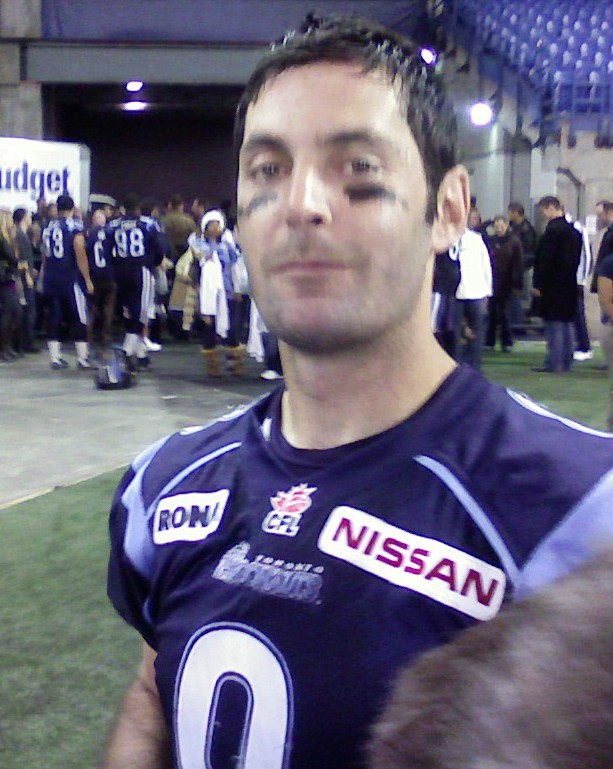

No. 8
- Position: Safety

Personal information
- Born: June 6, 1972 (age 54); Edmonton, Alberta, Canada
- Listed height: 5 ft 11 in (1.80 m)
- Listed weight: 187 lb (85 kg)

Career information
- High school: Harry Ainlay
- University: Manitoba
- CFL draft: 1997: 6th round, 47th overall pick

Career history
- 1997–2002: Edmonton Eskimos
- 2003–2008: Toronto Argonauts

Awards and highlights
- Grey Cup champion (2004)
- Stats at CFL.ca

Chris Hardy (born June 6, 1972 in Edmonton, Alberta) is a Canadian former professional football safety. He was drafted by the Edmonton Eskimos in the sixth round of the 1997 CFL draft. He played CIS Football at Manitoba. and Jamestown College in Jamestown North Dakota and Junior football with the Edmonton Huskies

Hardy also played for the Toronto Argonauts in his career and, in addition to his duties at the safety position, he was the team's back-up punter and placekicker. Hardy retired from the CFL on February 27, 2009.

After retiring from the CFL, Chris moved to Edmonton, Alberta.

He now maintains a career as a courier.
