= Jude St. John =

Canadian football player (born 1972)

No. 66
- Position: Guard

Personal information
- Born: December 4, 1972 (age 53); London, Ontario, Canada
- Listed height: 6 ft 4 in (1.93 m)
- Listed weight: 305 lb (138 kg)

Career information
- High school: Sir Frederick Banting
- College: Western Ontario
- CFL draft: 1995: 2nd round, 20th overall pick

Career history
- 1995–1997: Hamilton Tiger-Cats
- 1998–2008: Toronto Argonauts

Awards and highlights
- Grey Cup champion (2004); 3× CFL East All-Star (2001, 2005, 2006)
- Stats at CFL.ca

Jude St. John (born December 4, 1972) is a Canadian former professional football guard who played in the Canadian Football League (CFL). He was drafted 20th overall in the second round of the 1995 CFL Draft.
