= Obed Cétoute =

Canadian football player (born 1983)

No. 0
- Position: Wide receiver

Personal information
- Born: January 7, 1983 (age 43); Montreal, Quebec, Canada
- Listed height: 6 ft 4 in (1.93 m)
- Listed weight: 215 lb (98 kg)

Career information
- College: Central Michigan, Vanier College
- CFL draft: 2006: 4th round, 31st overall pick

Career history
- 2007–2009: Toronto Argonauts
- 2010–2011: Saskatchewan Roughriders
- Stats at CFL.ca (archive)

Obed Cétoute (born January 7, 1983) is a Canadian former professional football wide receiver. He was drafted in the fourth round with the 31st pick in the 2006 CFL draft by the Toronto Argonauts and signed with the team on May 27, 2007.

== Career ==
Cétoute played college football at Central Michigan, and before that at Vanier College for the Cheetahs.

Cétoute was traded to the Roughriders on June 6, 2010, in exchange for non-import offensive lineman Jonathan St. Pierre. Cétoute was released by the Riders on August 9, 2011.
