= Brian Ramsay =

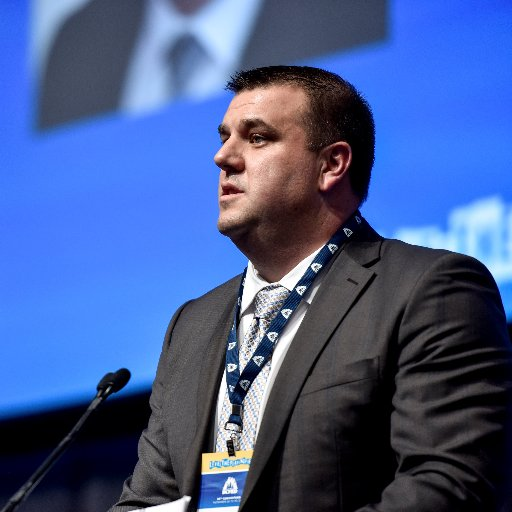
- BC Federation of Labour Convention (2018)

No. 63
- Position: Centre

Personal information
- Born: February 24, 1980 (age 46); Victoria, British Columbia, Canada
- Listed height: 6 ft 8 in (2.03 m)
- Listed weight: 310 lb (141 kg)

Career information
- High school: Reynolds
- College: New Mexico
- CFL draft: 2006: 5th round, 39th overall pick

Career history
- 2006–2010: Toronto Argonauts
- 2010: Hamilton Tiger-Cats
- 2011–2015: Edmonton Eskimos

Awards and highlights
- Grey Cup champion (2015)
- Stats at CFL.ca (archive)

Brian Ramsay (born February 24, 1980) is a Canadian labor leader, sports executive, and former professional football player. He is the Executive Director of the Professional Hockey Players' Association (PHPA), which represents players in the American Hockey League (AHL) and the ECHL. He previously served as the Executive Director of the Canadian Football League Players' Association (CFLPA).

== Early life and education ==
Born in Victoria, British Columbia, Ramsay attended the University of New Mexico, where he earned a Bachelor of Arts. He later received a Master of Business Administration from Royal Roads University. Before entering labor leadership, he articled with the accounting firm KPMG, focusing on the public and non-profit sectors.

== Playing career ==
Ramsay was selected by the Toronto Argonauts in the fifth round of the 2006 CFL Draft. He played nine seasons as an offensive lineman in the Canadian Football League, appearing in 152 games for the Toronto Argonauts, Hamilton Tiger-Cats, and Edmonton Elks.

== Canadian Football League Players' Association (2016-2024) ==
Ramsay was appointed Executive Director of the CFLPA in 2016. During his tenure, he oversaw the creation of the CFLPA Academy, a career-transition and education program for members. He also established affiliations with the United Steelworkers and the Canadian Labour Congress.

- Labor Negotiations: Ramsay led the 2019 collective bargaining negotiations, which resulted in new health and safety protocols and limits on contact practices. In 2022, he chaired the committee during the CFLPA's first work stoppage in 48 years. The resulting seven-year agreement introduced a revenue-sharing model and the league's first guaranteed contracts.
- Pandemic Management: He managed the association's response to the COVID-19 pandemic, negotiating contract amendments for the 2020 and 2021 seasons.

== Professional Hockey Players' Association (2024-present) ==
In August 2024, Ramsay succeeded Larry Landon as Executive Director of the PHPA. Under his leadership, the PHPA affiliated with the AFL-CIO and formed a strategic alliance with the National Hockey League Players' Association (NHLPA) to share administrative and legal resources.

- 2025 ECHL Strike: Following the expiry of the previous agreement in June 2024, ECHL players issued a strike notice in December 2025. The work stoppage resulted in the postponement of over 40 games.
- New Agreements: On December 30, 2025, a new five-year CBA was ratified, including year-round benefit coverage and a modified salary cap. Simultaneously, Ramsay finalized a new agreement with the AHL that introduced the league's first formal mental health and substance abuse program.

== Advocacy ==
Ramsay leads a coalition of sports unions advocating for the inclusion of professional athletes under provincial workers' compensation frameworks in Canada. This initiative led to formal review by WorkSafeBC in 2022.
