= Henry A. Lorberg =

American journalist (1856–1943)

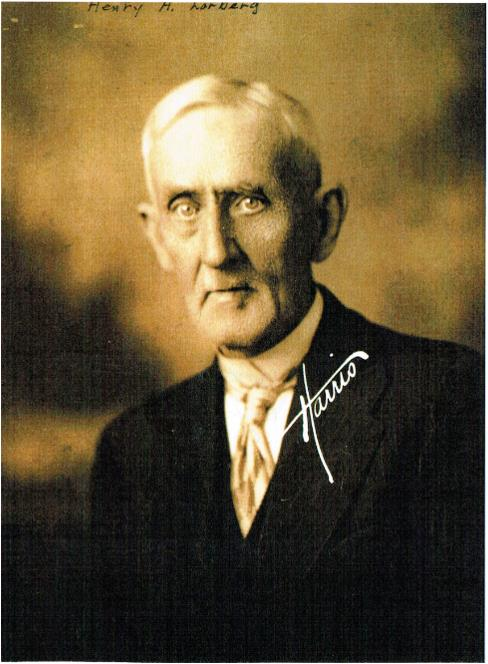
- Born: August 1, 1856; Portsmouth, Ohio
- Died: April 11, 1943 (aged 86); Portsmouth, Ohio
- Resting place: Greenlawn Cemetery, Portsmouth, Ohio
- Occupations: Journalist, Historian, Entrepreneur
- Employer: Portsmouth Daily Times (until 1902)

Henry August Lorberg (1856–1943) was an American journalist, entrepreneur, and local historian of Portsmouth and Scioto County, Ohio. He was the son of German immigrants. His father, August Lorberg, (1825–1899), was a tailor in Portsmouth.

Lorberg was instrumental in securing a $50,000 contribution from Andrew Carnegie for the construction of the Portsmouth Public Library in 1901. Library construction was completed in 1906. The library continues to serve Portsmouth and Scioto County with four branch locations.

Lorberg worked as a reporter for the Portsmouth Times and other local newspapers, for many years. Lorberg wrote and published several books of local history, including "Recollections of 50 Years", "The Centennial Souvenir of Portsmouth", "Portsmouth Past and Present", etc. These books contained many photographs and stories of Portsmouth's early history. Lorberg's 136-page, 1908 book, "Pictorial Portsmouth, the Peerless City, Past and Present", was well received. The reviewer called it "the finest thing of its kind the Times has ever seen...The portraits include most of the people who have ever been prominent in Portsmouth, many of whom are dead, many being still alive and among our active citizens."

Around 1901, Lorberg traveled with evangelist Billy Sunday on a preaching tour from New York City to Omaha, Nebraska. In 1914, Lorberg was reported to be in "charge of postcard and literature sales in connection with the Billy Sunday meetings."

== Souvenirs and postcards ==
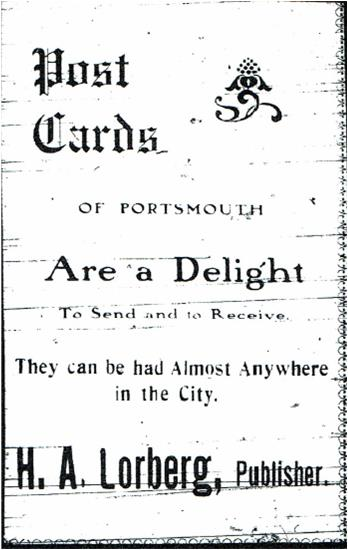
Advertisement for Lorberg's Postcard business

Lorberg retired from newspaper journalism in 1902. "Henry A. Lorberg has resigned his position on the Daily Times reportorial staff, and will devote his time to his mail order business, which has grown to large proportions and has become very profitable."

A significant part of Lorberg's business was the publication and distribution of postcards featuring over 2,500 local landscape scenes, beginning in the late 1800s. Lorberg's black and white photographs of everyday local scenes were sent to Germany where they were colorized and reproduced as postcards. These were returned across the Atlantic and sold in local stores. In 1915, World War I blocked the import of any more postcards from Germany, and Lorberg began using printing companies within the United States.

Lorberg also maintained coin-operated scales around the city in the early 1900s. "Henry Lorberg received another consignment of penny weighing machines Thursday and has placed them at advantageous points about town. One was stationed at the northeast entrance to York Place."

== Portsmouth Indian Head Rock ==
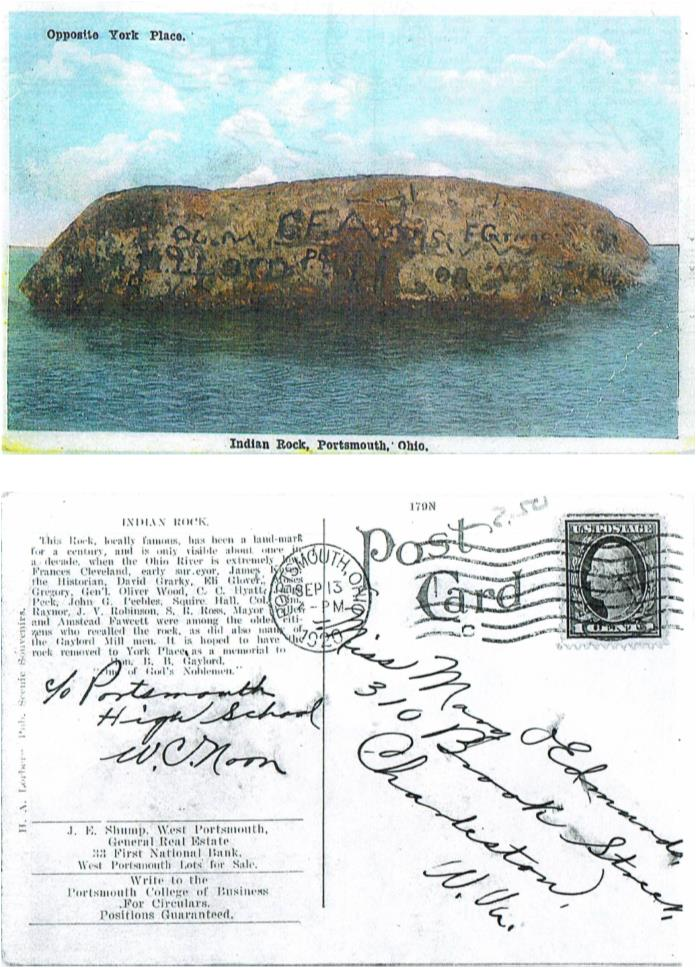
Early 20th c. postcard, featuring Indian Head Rock. Description (back) states: "Indian Rock: This Rock, locally famous, has been a landmark for a century..."

In 1908 Lorberg put forward a proposal to preserve and display the Indian Head Rock, a large boulder in the Ohio River with a strong connection to Portsmouth history. "Henry Lorberg is going to communicate with the light house department with a view to having the snag boat Woodruff pull up the Indian rock, the idea of Mr. Lorberg being to have the city place the historic bowlder [sic] in York park, in a position overlooking the river...Portsmouth is the River City and to preserve the rock in the manner referred to would be highly appropriate." Lorberg's proposal was not acted upon.

Lorberg wrote about the Indian Head Rock in one of his histories of the City of Portsmouth. "Indian Rock on the Kentucky shore opposite Court Street, could be seen in 1875...Many young men carved their initials on it, and an Indian head was also cut in the stone. The Rock could only be seen when the Ohio was extremely low--about once in a decade; but since the River Dams have been built, it is now entirely out of view, and has probably been seen for the last time by the present generation. It served as a good diving point for boys who went swimming in the River. Henry Bannon’s History of Scioto County gives a more detailed description of the rock."

Lorberg also promoted the Indian Head Rock by featuring it in his popular souvenir postcards of the Portsmouth area.
