= 1982 Ohio Secretary of State election =

- November 2, 1982
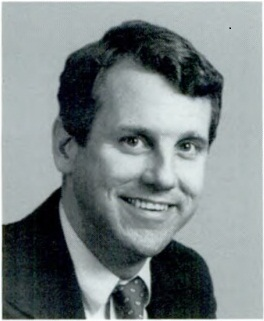

| Nominee | Sherrod Brown | Virgil Brown |
| Party | Democratic | Republican |
| Popular vote | 1,739,602 | 1,362,079 |
| Percentage | 53.60% | 41.97% |
- County results Brown: 40-50% 50–60% 60–70% 70–80% Brown: 40-50% 50–60%
Secretary of State before election
Anthony J. Celebrezze Jr.
Democratic
Elected Secretary of State
Sherrod Brown
Democratic

The 1982 Ohio Secretary of State election was held on November 2, 1982, to elect the Ohio Secretary of State. Democratic Ohio State Representative Sherrod Brown defeated his opponent, Republican Cuyahoga County Commissioner Virgil Brown, with 53.60% of the vote.

== Background ==
The incumbent Ohio Secretary of State, Anthony J. Celebrezze Jr., chose not to run for re-election in order to run for Ohio Attorney General, leaving the seat open.

== Democratic primary ==
=== Candidates ===
- Sherrod Brown, Ohio State Representative (1975–1983)
- Dennis Kucinich, Mayor of Cleveland (1977–1979)
- Anthony O. Calabrese, Ohio State Senator (1956–1980)
- Frank Gaul, Cuyahoga County Treasurer (1976–1995)

=== Campaign ===
The Democratic primary was held on June 8, 1982. The primary was crowded, but Brown managed to win with a plurality of the vote, six points ahead of his closest opponent, Kucinich.

=== Results ===
Democratic primary results
| Party | Candidate | Votes | % |
|---|---|---|---|
| Democratic | Sherrod Brown | 304,952 | 33.77% |
| Democratic | Dennis Kucinich | 246,618 | 27.31% |
| Democratic | Anthony O. Calabrese | 214,901 | 23.8% |
| Democratic | Frank Gaul | 136,568 | 15.12% |
| Total votes | | 903,039 | 100.00% |

== Republican primary ==
=== Candidates ===
- Virgil Brown, Cuyahoga County Commissioner (1979–1991)

=== Campaign ===
The Republican primary was held on June 8, 1982. Virgil Brown won the Republican nomination unopposed.

=== Results ===
Republican primary results
| Party | Candidate | Votes | % |
|---|---|---|---|
| Republican | Virgil Brown | 538,801 | 100% |
| Total votes | | 538,801 | 100.00% |

== General election ==
=== Candidates ===
- Sherrod Brown, Ohio State Representative (1975–1983) (Democratic)
- Virgil Brown, Cuyahoga County Commissioner (1979–1991) (Republican)
- Margaret Ann Leech (Libertarian)

=== Results ===
1982 Ohio Secretary of State election results
| Party | Candidate | Votes | % | ±% |
|---|---|---|---|---|
| Democratic | Sherrod Brown | 1,739,602 | 53.60% | +3.45 |
| Republican | Virgil Brown | 1,362,079 | 41.97% | −7.88% |
| Libertarian | Margaret Ann Leech | 143,943 | 4.43% | N/A |
| Total votes | | 3,245,624 | 100.00% | |
| Democratic hold | | | | |
