= Lucien J. Fenton =

American politician

Lucien Jerome Fenton
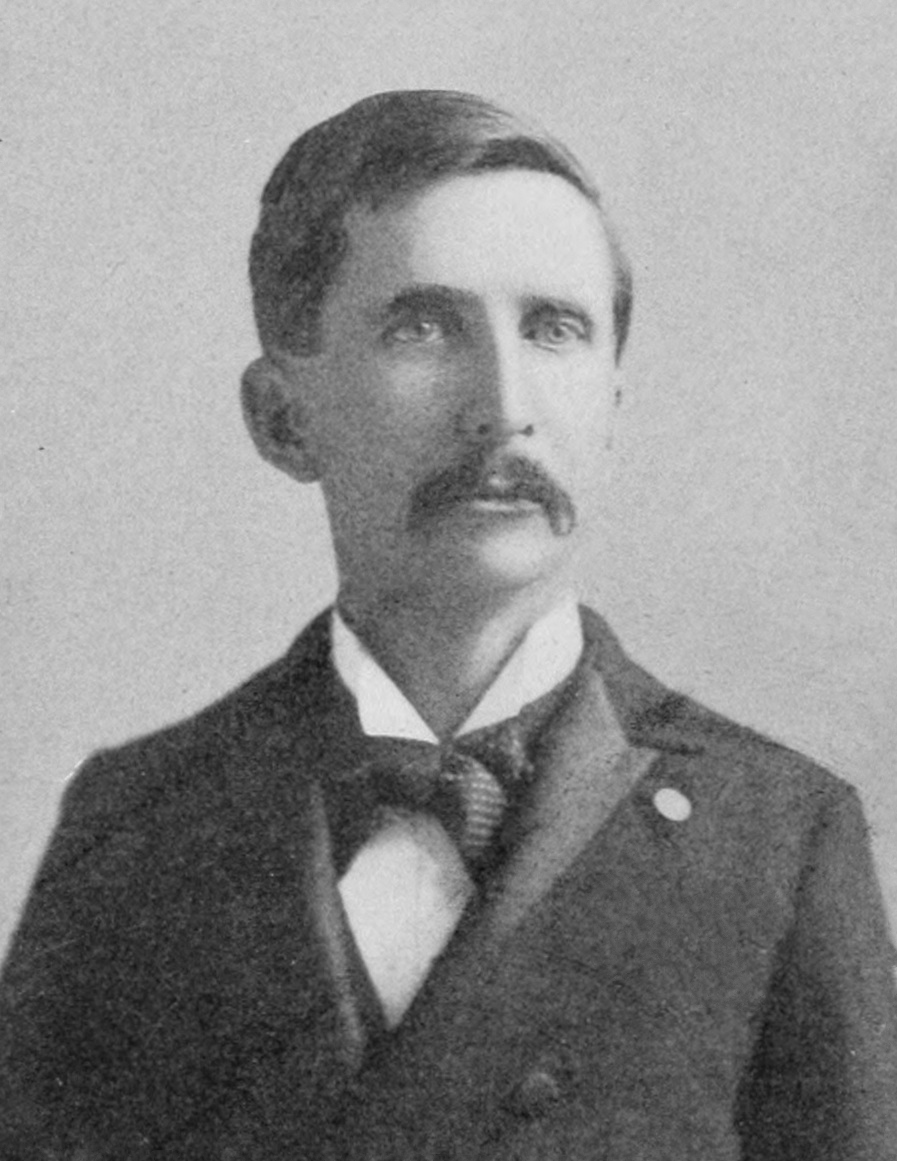

Member of the U.S. House of Representatives from Ohio's 10th district
- In office March 4, 1895 – March 3, 1899
- Preceded by: Hezekiah S. Bundy
- Succeeded by: Stephen Morgan

Personal details
- Born: May 7, 1844 Winchester, Ohio, US
- Died: June 28, 1922 (aged 78) Winchester, Ohio, US
- Party: Republican
- Education: National Normal University, Ohio University

Lucien Jerome Fenton (May 7, 1844 – June 28, 1922) was an American Civil War veteran who served two term as a U.S. representative from Ohio from 1895 to 1899.

== Biography ==
Born in Winchester, Ohio, Fenton attended the public schools, National Normal University, Lebanon, Ohio, and Ohio University at Athens. Enlisted as a private in Company I, Ninety-first Regiment, Ohio Volunteer Infantry, August 11, 1862. He was discharged because of wounds on May 29, 1865.

=== Career ===
He taught school from 1865 to 1881. He was an unsuccessful candidate for clerk of the courts of Adams County in 1880. He served as clerk in the United States Treasury Department, Washington, D.C. from 1881 to 1884. He returned to Ohio and organized the Winchester Bank in 1884. He was appointed a trustee of the Ohio University at Athens by Governor McKinley in 1892. He served as delegate to the Republican National Convention in 1892.

=== Congress ===
Fenton was elected as a Republican to the Fifty-fourth and Fifty-fifth Congresses (March 4, 1895 – March 3, 1899). He was an unsuccessful candidate for renomination in 1898.

=== Death ===
He resumed banking in Winchester, Ohio. He served as president of the Winchester School Board 1912-1922. He served as president of the Adams County School Board 1918-1922.

== Death ==
He died in Winchester, Ohio, June 28, 1922. He was interred in Winchester Cemetery.

== Sources ==
- United States Congress. "Lucien J. Fenton (id: F000076)". Biographical Directory of the United States Congress.

U.S. House of Representatives
Preceded by Hezekiah S. Bundy	Member of the U.S. House of Representatives from Ohio's 10th congressional district March 4, 1895–March 3, 1899	Succeeded by Stephen Morgan
