= Thomas A. Jenkins =

American politician

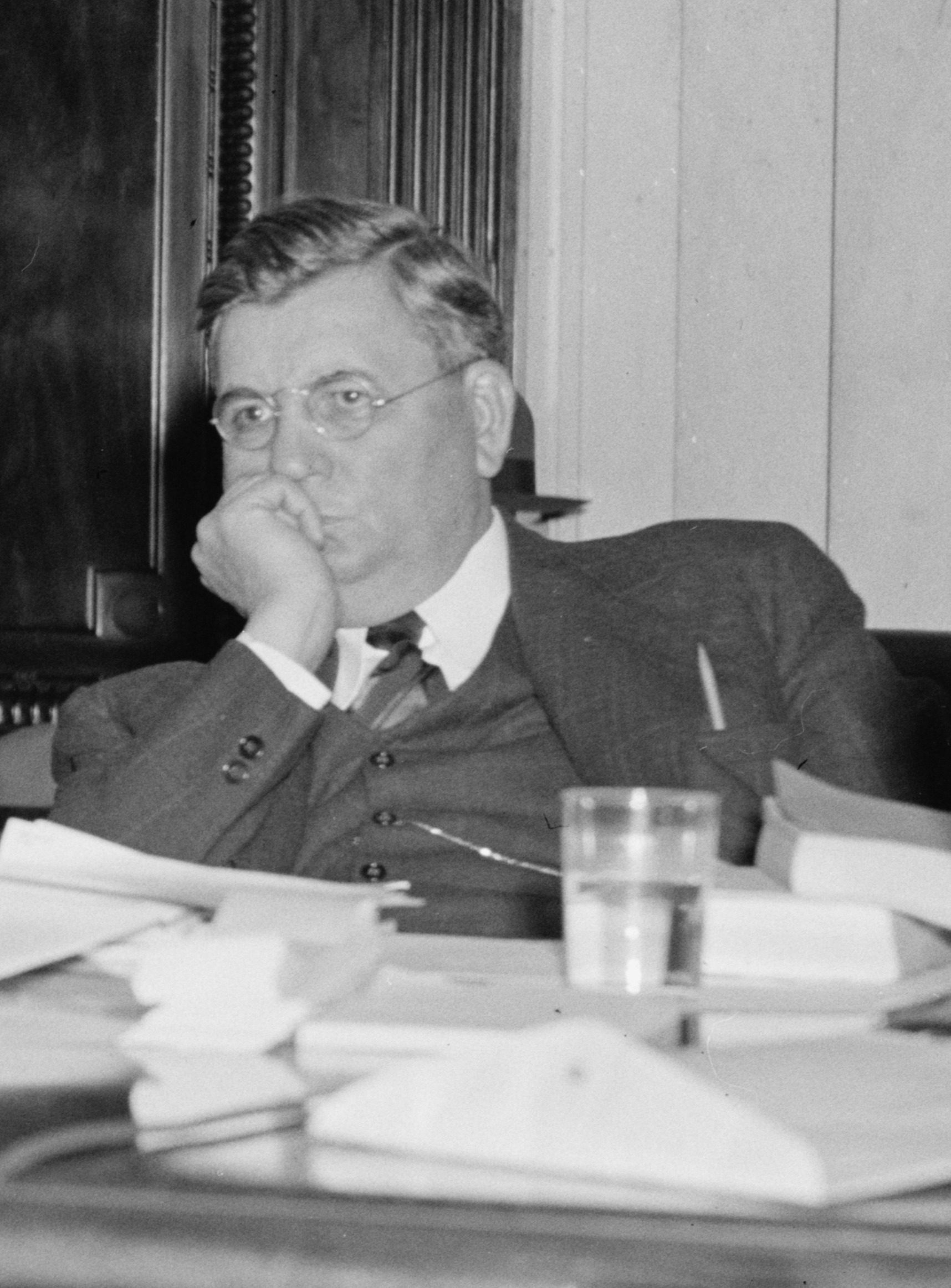
- Jenkins at a TVA committee hearing, November 23, 1938

Member of the U.S. House of Representatives from Ohio's 10th district
- In office March 4, 1925 – January 3, 1959
- Preceded by: Israel M. Foster
- Succeeded by: Walter H. Moeller

Member of the Ohio Senate
- In office 1923-1924

Personal details
- Born: Thomas Albert Jenkins; October 28, 1880 Oak Hill, Ohio, U.S.
- Died: December 21, 1959 (aged 79) Ironton, Ohio, U.S.
- Resting place: Woodland Cemetery, Ironton, Ohio, U.S.
- Party: Republican
- Education: Ohio State University College of Law

Thomas Albert Jenkins (October 28, 1880 – December 21, 1959) was a member of the Ohio state senate and a long-serving U.S. Representative from Ohio's 10th District (from 1925 to 1959). He was born in Oak Hill, Jackson County, Ohio.

== Background ==
Jenkins graduated from Providence College, Oak Hill, Ohio, in 1901 and received a law degree from Ohio State University at Columbus in 1907.

== Career ==
Jenkins was admitted to the bar that same year (1907) and commenced practice in Ironton, Ohio. He was prosecuting attorney of Lawrence County, Ohio, from 1916 to 1920. In 1923 and 1924, Jenkins served in the Ohio Senate and was a delegate to the Republican State convention in 1920 and 1924.

=== Congress ===
He was elected as a Republican to the Sixty-ninth and to the sixteen succeeding Congresses (March 4, 1925 – January 3, 1959). Jenkins was a delegate to Republican National Convention from Ohio in 1940, 1944. In 1947, he served on the Herter Committee. After the Dunkirk evacuation and during the Battle of Britain Jenkins spoke out in favor of giving aid to the British and campaigned against isolationism. He had a reputation for being so outspokenly pro-British that in the 1940 election, his opponent, isolationist Democrat John P. Kelso referred to him as the "Congressman from London." Jenkins responded by calling his opponent a "Craven stooge for Herr Hitler." In March 1941, he discussed the outcome of the British raid into Norway known as Operation Claymore when news of it played on American news reels, and argued this was proof that Britain could win if only we gave them the help they needed. Jenkins was, however, an opponent of the Lend-Lease bill and spoke fervently against it. During one such speech on the House floor, on February 5, 1941, Jenkins questioned the origins of the bill and made accusations bordering on conspiracy, saying "Can it be in the insatiable ambition of the President to want to have a hand in the domination of the world?” and citing alleged "moneyed influences against whom Hitler has committed some special act which they resent," a poorly concealed reference to Jews. Despite supporting aid to Britain overall, he voted against the Lend-Lease bill. Jenkins later voted in favor of the Civil Rights Act of 1957. He was not a candidate for renomination in 1958.

== Death ==
Jenkins died in 1959 and was interred at Woodland Cemetery, in Ironton, Ohio.

U.S. House of Representatives
| Preceded by Israel M. Foster | Member of the U.S. House of Representatives from Ohio's 10th congressional district March 4, 1925–January 3, 1959 | Succeeded by Walter H. Moeller |
