= Walter H. Moeller =

American politician

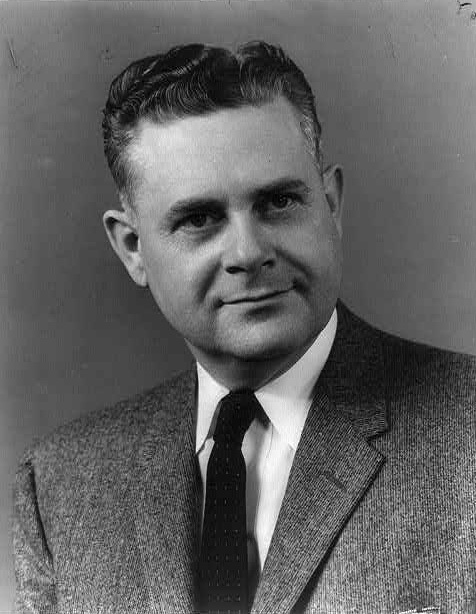

Member of the U.S. House of Representatives from Ohio's 10th district
- In office January 3, 1965 – January 3, 1967
- Preceded by: Pete Abele
- Succeeded by: Clarence E. Miller
- In office January 3, 1959 – January 3, 1963
- Preceded by: Thomas A. Jenkins
- Succeeded by: Pete Abele

Personal details
- Born: Walter Henry Moeller; March 15, 1910 New Palestine, Indiana
- Died: April 13, 1999 (aged 89) Santa Barbara, California
- Party: Democratic

Walter Henry Moeller (March 15, 1910 – April 13, 1999) was an American pastor and politician from the Democratic Party. Between 1959 and 1967, he served three terms representing Ohio's 10th congressional district in the House of Representatives, during the 86th, 87th, and 89th Congresses.

== Biography ==
Moeller was born on March 15, 1910, in New Palestine, Indiana. He entered a Lutheran seminary in 1935 and served as a pastor in the 1940s and after his retirement from politics.

== Career ==
=== Congress ===
Moeller became active in Ohio politics in the 1950s, serving in the United States House of Representatives from 1959 to 1963 and from 1965 to 1967.

=== Later career ===
After leaving Congress, he acted as an assistant to the education director of NASA and was a member of Kiwanis.

=== Death ===
Moeller died in Santa Barbara, California, on April 13, 1999, age 89. He had been doing pastoral work in the state.

== Electoral history ==
Year	Democratic	Republican	Other
1958	Walter H. Moeller: 47,939	Homer E. "Pete" Abele: 42,607	
1960	Walter H. Moeller: 58,085	Oakley C. Collins: 52,479	
1962	Walter H. Moeller: 42,131	Homer E. "Pete" Abele: 46,158	
1964	Walter H. Moeller: 54,729	Homer E. "Pete" Abele: 49,744	
1966	Walter H. Moeller: 52,258	Clarence E. Miller: 56,659	

== See also ==
- Ohio's 10th congressional district#Recent election results
- List of United States representatives from Ohio

U.S. House of Representatives
Preceded by Thomas A. Jenkins	Member of the U.S. House of Representatives from Ohio's 10th congressional district 1959–1963	Succeeded by Pete Abele
Preceded by Pete Abele	Member of the U.S. House of Representatives from Ohio's 10th congressional district 1965–1967	Succeeded by Clarence E. Miller
