= Stephen Morgan (American politician) =

American politician

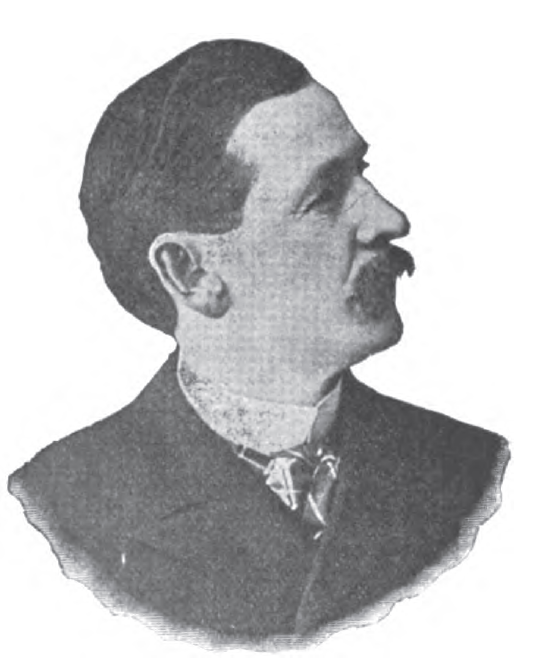

Member of the U.S. House of Representatives from Ohio's 10th district
- In office March 4, 1899 – March 3, 1905
- Preceded by: Lucien J. Fenton
- Succeeded by: Henry T. Bannon

Personal details
- Born: January 25, 1854 Jackson County, Ohio
- Died: February 9, 1928 (aged 74) Magnetic Springs, Ohio
- Resting place: Horeb Cemetery
- Party: Republican
- Education: National Normal University

Stephen Morgan (January 25, 1854 – February 9, 1928) was a U.S. representative from Ohio.

== Early life and career ==
Born in Jackson County, Ohio, Morgan attended the common schools, Central College, Worthington, Ohio, and the National Normal University, Lebanon, Ohio. He taught in the public schools of Jackson County for a number of years. School examiner for nine years and principal of Oak Hill Academy for fifteen years.

== Congress ==
Morgan was elected as a Republican to the Fifty-sixth, Fifty-seventh, and Fifty-eighth Congresses (March 4, 1899 – March 3, 1905). He was an unsuccessful candidate for reelection in 1904 to the Fifty-ninth Congress.

== Retirement and death ==
He moved to Columbus, Ohio, and retired from public life.

He died at Magnetic Springs, Ohio, February 9, 1928. He was interred in Horeb Cemetery, near Oak Hill, Ohio.

== Sources ==
- United States Congress. "Stephen Morgan (id: M000957)". Biographical Directory of the United States Congress.

U.S. House of Representatives
Preceded by Lucien J. Fenton	Member of the U.S. House of Representatives from Ohio's 10th congressional district March 4, 1899–March 3, 1905	Succeeded by Henry T. Bannon
