= Adna R. Johnson =

American politician

Adna Romulus Johnson
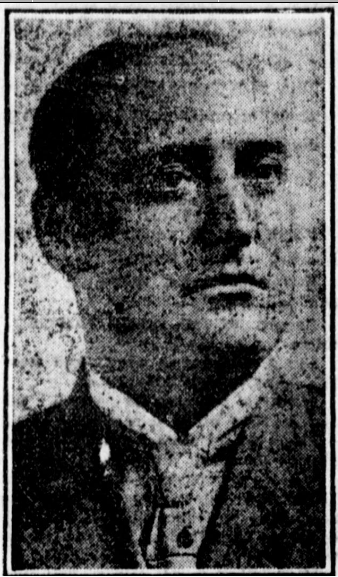

Member of the U.S. House of Representatives from Ohio's 10th district
- In office March 4, 1909 – March 3, 1911
- Preceded by: Henry T. Bannon
- Succeeded by: Robert M. Switzer

Personal details
- Born: December 14, 1860 Sweet Springs, Missouri
- Died: June 11, 1938 (aged 77) Ironton, Ohio
- Party: Republican
- Education: University of Michigan Law School

Adna Romulus Johnson (December 14, 1860 – June 11, 1938) was a teacher, lawyer, and U.S. Representative from Ohio for one term from 1909 to 1911.

== Biography ==
Born in Sweet Springs, Missouri, Johnson moved with his mother to a farm in Lawrence County, Ohio, in 1864, where attended the common schools. He taught school seven years and then studied law. He was admitted to the bar in 1886.

Johnson graduated from the University of Michigan Law School at Ann Arbor in 1887 and practiced his profession in Ironton, Ohio. He served as the prosecuting attorney of Lawrence County in 1889.

Johnson was elected as a Republican to the Sixty-first Congress (March 4, 1909–March 3, 1911). He was renominated without opposition in 1910, but declined to accept. He resumed the practice of law in Ironton. He also engaged in banking and was financially interested in various manufacturing concerns. Johnson served as president of the Ohio State Bar Association in 1933.

=== Death ===
He died in Ironton on June 11, 1938, and was interred in Woodland Cemetery.

== Sources ==
- United States Congress. "Adna R. Johnson (id: J000113)". Biographical Directory of the United States Congress.

U.S. House of Representatives
Preceded by Henry T. Bannon	Member of the U.S. House of Representatives from Ohio's 10th congressional district March 4, 1909–March 3, 1911	Succeeded by Robert M. Switzer
