= Pete Abele =

American politician (1916–2000)

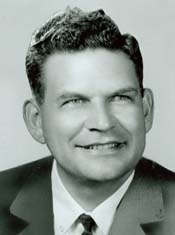

Member of the U.S. House of Representatives from Ohio's 10th district
- In office January 3, 1963 – January 3, 1965
- Preceded by: Walter H. Moeller
- Succeeded by: Walter H. Moeller

Member of the Ohio House of Representatives
- In office 1949–1952

Personal details
- Born: November 21, 1916 Wellston, Ohio, U.S.
- Died: May 12, 2000 (aged 83) Hamden, Ohio, U.S.
- Party: Republican
- Education: Ohio University (BA); Ohio State University (JD)

Military service
- Allegiance: United States
- Branch/service: United States Army: United States Army Air Corps
- Years of service: 1943–1946

Homer E. "Pete" Abele (November 21, 1916 – May 12, 2000) was an American lobbyist, lawyer, jurist, and politician from the Republican Party. He was active in Ohio politics, and represented the state in the House of Representatives for one term from 1963 to 1965.

== Early life and education ==
Homer "Pete" Abele graduated from Wellston High School in his birthplace of Wellston, Ohio in 1934. From 1935 to 1936, he served in the Civilian Conservation Corps. From 1938 to 1941, he lived in Lancaster, Ohio and McArthur, Ohio, working for the Anchor Hocking Glass Corp. and the Austin Powder Co.

In 1948, he earned a Bachelor of Arts in pre-law from Ohio University in Athens, Ohio. In 1953, he received a Juris Doctor from the Moritz College of Law at Ohio State University in Columbus, Ohio.

== Career ==
In 1941, Abele joined the Ohio State Highway Patrol and worked as a state trooper from 1941 to 1946, except for a stint in the Army Air Corps from 1943 to 1946.

=== Early political activities ===
In 1949, while still a student in law school, Abele was elected to the Ohio House of Representatives, where he served from 1949 to 1952. In 1952, Abele joined the unsuccessful presidential campaign of Robert A. Taft.

From 1953 to 1957, Abele was a lobbyist for railroad interests. In 1956, he was appointed solicitor of the village of McArthur, Ohio. In 1952, Abele attended the Republican National Convention. In 1956, he was a delegate to the convention. From 1954 to 1957, Abele was the chairman of the Vinton County, Ohio, Republican Executive Committee.

=== Congress ===
In 1958, Abele was the Republican nominee for U.S. Representative from Ohio's 10th congressional district. He lost to incumbent Walter H. Moeller. Abele challenged Moeller again in 1962, and unseated him; he began his service in 1963 in the 88th United States Congress. Abele voted in favor of the Civil Rights Act of 1964. He served only one term and in 1964, Moeller won the seat back from Abele.

=== Judge ===
In 1966, Abele was elected to the office of judge of the Ohio Court of Appeals for the Fourth District. He was re-elected in 1972, 1978, and 1984. He retired at the end of his fourth term in 1991. During his tenure, he was presiding judge from 1977 to 1978 and from 1983 to 1984. In 1978, Abele was chief justice of the Ohio Court of Appeals. Abele also occasionally sat as a visiting judge on the Ohio Supreme Court.

Abele remained a member of the Ohio State Highway Patrol Auxiliary, maintaining the rank of major. From 1967 to 1991, every graduating class of the State Highway Patrol Academy was administered its oath of office by Abele.

== Death ==
He died in Hamden, Ohio at age 83 after suffering from Alzheimer's disease.

== Personal life ==
Abele's son Peter B. Abele was a judge on the Fourth District Appeals Court until he died in September 2026.

== Electoral history ==
Year	Democratic	Republican	Other
1958	Walter H. Moeller: 47,939	Homer E. "Pete" Abele: 42,607	
1962	Walter H. Moeller: 42,131	Homer E. "Pete" Abele: 46,158	
1964	Walter H. Moeller: 54,729	Homer E. "Pete" Abele: 49,744	

== See also ==
- List of United States representatives from Ohio

U.S. House of Representatives
Preceded by Walter H. Moeller	Member of the U.S. House of Representatives from Ohio's 10th congressional district January 3, 1963 – January 3, 1965	Succeeded by Walter H. Moeller
