= Clarence E. Miller =

American politician

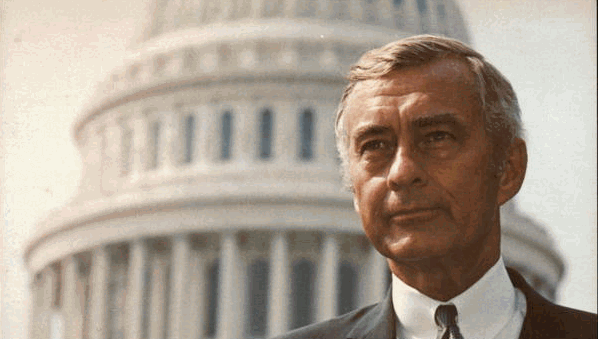

Member of the U.S. House of Representatives from Ohio's 10th district
- In office January 3, 1967 – January 3, 1993
- Preceded by: Walter H. Moeller
- Succeeded by: Dave Hobson (redistricting)

Personal details
- Born: Clarence Ellsworth Miller; November 1, 1917 Lancaster, Ohio, U.S.
- Died: August 2, 2011 (aged 93) Lancaster, Ohio, U.S.
- Party: Republican

Clarence Ellsworth Miller, Jr. (November 1, 1917 – August 2, 2011) was a Republican congressman from Ohio, serving January 3, 1967 to January 3, 1993.

== Early life and education ==
He was born in Lancaster, Ohio, one of six children of an electrician father. After graduating from high school, he enrolled in correspondence school and became a certified electrical engineer. He worked for Columbia Gas and held patents related to the pumping of gas.

== Congress ==
Miller was elected to the U.S. House of Representatives in 1966 to represent a section of southeastern Ohio where, in Lancaster, he had served as mayor. During the Persian Gulf War, he was reportedly the only member of Congress who had a grandson (Drew Miller, of Lancaster, Ohio) fighting in that conflict.

By training, he was an engineer, and The Almanac of American Politics wrote that Mr. Miller approached politics with the "precise and orderly manner" that one might expect from someone of his profession.

== U.S. patents ==
U.S. patent 3,088,655, Filed August 1, 1960, Patented May 7, 1963 "Remote Control and Alarm System For A Compressor Station and Compressor Engines Thereof"

U.S. patent 3,210,582, Filed July 26, 1960, Patented October 5, 1965 "Magneto Having Auxiliary Pole Piece"

== Elections ==
In 1966, the Tenth Congressional District elected Miller to the Ninetieth Congress, defeating incumbent Democrat Walter H. Moeller, and he was re-elected to twelve succeeding Congresses.

Miller was a 13-term Ohio Republican nicknamed "Five Percent Clarence" for his persistent efforts to cut spending bills by that amount. He did not cultivate publicity, preferring instead to focus on legislation more than on the Washington talk-show circuit. He was known for his near-perfect attendance on votes no matter how minute. In 1990, the Capitol Hill publication Roll Call named Mr. Miller the "most obscure" member of Congress. It was intended as a compliment, considering that grandstanders never would have received such an honor. A fiscal conservative, he served on the House Appropriations Committee. The numerous bills he introduced, often unsuccessfully, aimed to cut spending measures—if not by the 5 percent figure in his nickname, then at least by 2 percent. In 1977, he succeeded in persuading House colleagues to cut foreign aid by 5 percent.

He lost his bid for reelection in the 1992 primary after redistricting.

== Elections by landslide ==
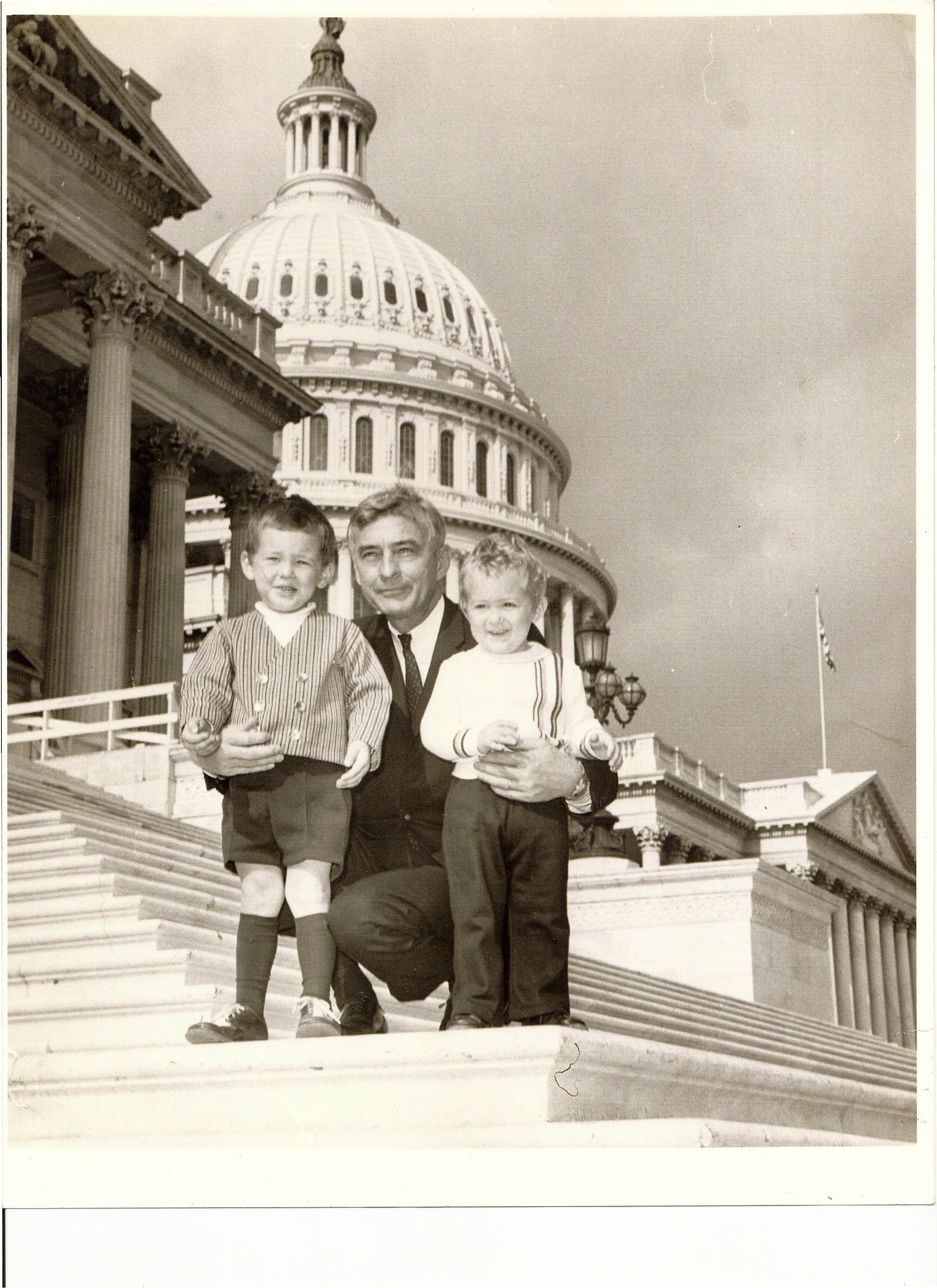
In his younger years.

Twelve of the thirteen elections won by Mr. Miller were by a margin of victory of greater than 25%.

== Heated 1992 primary ==
Ohio lost two seats in the 1990 reapportionment. The Democrats and Republicans in the Ohio General Assembly struck a deal to eliminate one Democratic and one Republican district, as one congressman from each party was expected to retire. The Republican expected to retire was Miller, but he announced he would run again. The Democrats in the Statehouse would not reconsider the deal and so Miller's Tenth District was obliterated. (The new Tenth was in Cuyahoga County.)

The new district map was not agreed upon by the General Assembly until March 26, 1992, one week before the filing deadline for the primary originally scheduled for May 5. (Governor George Voinovich signed the new map into law on March 27, and on April 1 the General Assembly moved the primary to June 2.) Miller's own hometown was placed in freshman David Hobson's Seventh District, but Miller chose to run in the Sixth District against Bob McEwen; only one of the twelve counties in Miller's old Tenth District was in the new Seventh but the largest piece of his old district, five counties, was placed in the new Sixth. Miller also had a strong distaste for McEwen, a Hillsboro Republican in his sixth term who had been elected to Congress at age thirty.

Despite being hurt in a fall in his bathtub after slipping on a bar of soap, an injury that led Republicans to expect his withdrawal, Miller stayed in the race. A deal was hoped for as late as May 15, the day Miller was scheduled to hold a press conference Ohio political observers thought he would use to announce his withdrawal, but Miller stayed in the race and the two incumbents faced each other in the Republican primary on June 2, 1992.

McEwen, who Congressional Quarterly's Politics in America pronounced "invincible", was caught up in the House banking scandal, which had been seized upon by Newt Gingrich, a like-minded conservative House Republican, as an example of the corruption of Congress. Martin Gottlieb of the Dayton Daily News said "McEwen was collateral damage" to Gingrich's crusade. McEwen initially denied bouncing any checks. Later, he admitted he had bounced a few. Then when the full totals were released by Ethics Committee investigators, the number was revealed to have been 166 over thirty-nine months. McEwen said that he always had funds available to cover the alleged overdrafts, pointing to the policy of the House sergeant at arms, who ran the House bank, paying checks on an overdrawn account if it would not exceed the sum of the Representative's next paycheck. In 1991, McEwen had also been criticized for his use of the franking privilege and his frequent trips overseas at taxpayer expense, but McEwen defended the trips as part of his work on the Intelligence Committee and in building relationships with legislatures overseas.

The primary race was bitter. Miller called McEwen "Pinocchio" and McEwen said of Miller "his misrepresentations and falsehoods are gargantuan. I tried to be his best friend in the delegation. I am deeply disappointed at the meanness of his effort." Tom Deimer of Cleveland's Plain Dealer wrote that the two candidates were largely identical on the issues: "both are textbook Republican conservatives, opposed to abortion, gun control, high taxes, and costly government programs — unless located in their districts." Miller noted he had no overdrafts, saying, "the score is 166 to nothing" referring to the number of checks McEwen bounced in the House banking scandal.

The 1992 primary was so close it forced a recount and a lawsuit. When Ohio Secretary of State Bob Taft dismissed Miller's charges of voting irregularities in Highland, Hocking, and Warren Counties, Miller filed suit in the Ohio Supreme Court. Only in August did Miller drop his court challenge and then only because his campaign was out of money. In the final count, McEwen won 33,219 votes to Miller's 32,922, a plurality of only 297 votes. Ominously for November, each had won the counties they had formerly represented, McEwen making little headway in the new eastern counties in the district. After the final result, Miller refused to endorse McEwen and carried an unsuccessful legal challenge to the redistricting to the United States Supreme Court, insisting district lines should be drawn on a politically neutral basis. After the primary, McEwen introduced H. R. 5727 in the House to name the locks on the Ohio near Gallipolis after Miller, but the bill did not pass. McEwen subsequently lost the general election that year to Ted Strickland.

== Family ==
His wife of 51 years, the former Helen Brown, died in 1987. The couple had two children, Ronald K. Miller of Lancaster and Jacqueline M. Williams of Cincinnati; five grandchildren; and nine great-grandchildren.

== Death ==
After his election loss Clarence Miller returned to Lancaster. He was honored on his birthday, November 20, 2010, by the Hocking Valley Chapter of the Ohio Society of The Sons of the American Revolution, for his patriotism. He resided in Lancaster until his death on August 2, 2011, aged 93.

== See also ==
- List of United States representatives from Ohio

U.S. House of Representatives
Preceded by Walter H. Moeller	Member of the U.S. House of Representatives from Ohio's 10th congressional district January 3, 1967–January 3, 1993	Succeeded by Martin Hoke
