= Indian Head Rock =

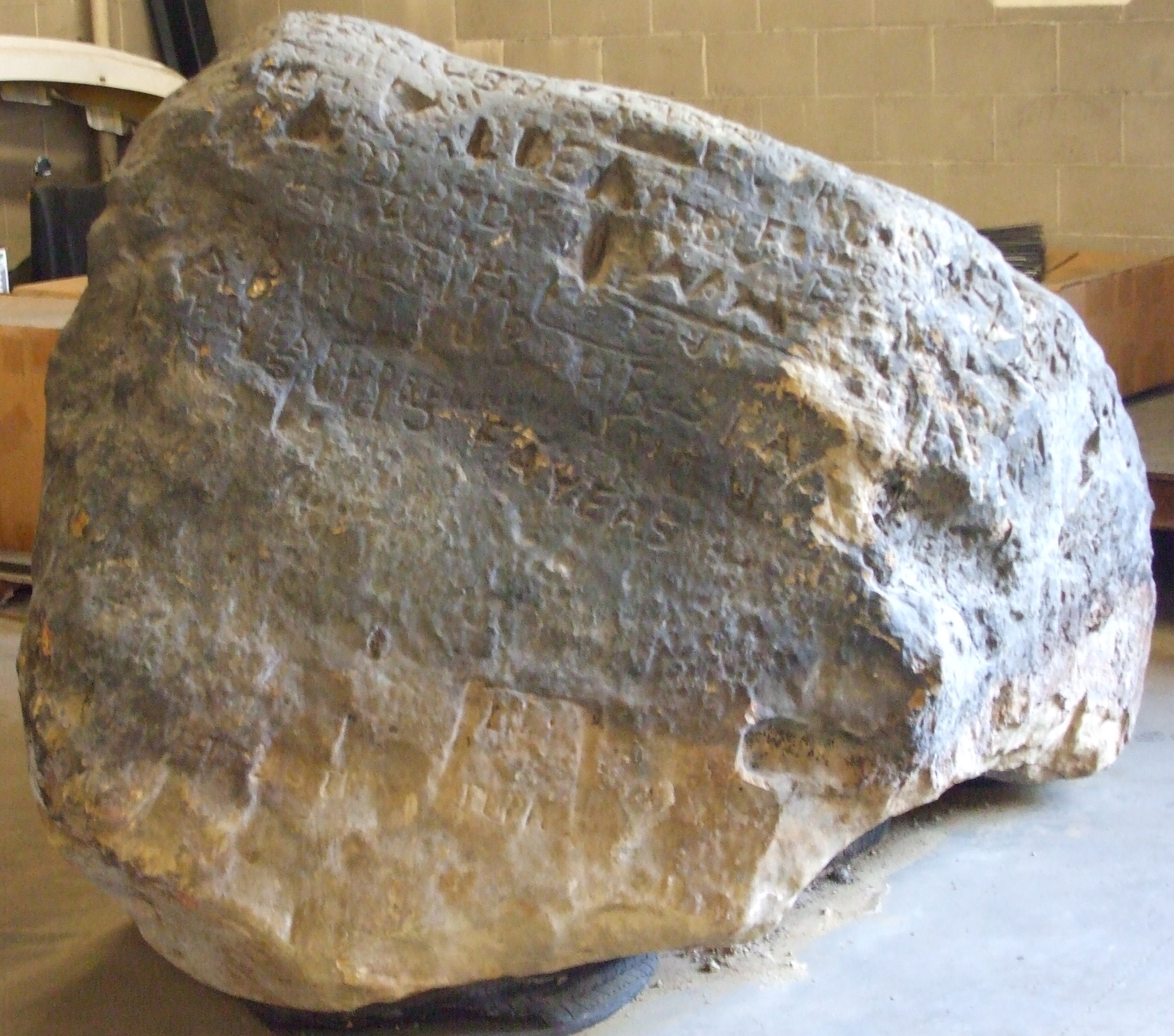
- Indian Head Rock in 2007, stored in municipal garage, Portsmouth, Ohio

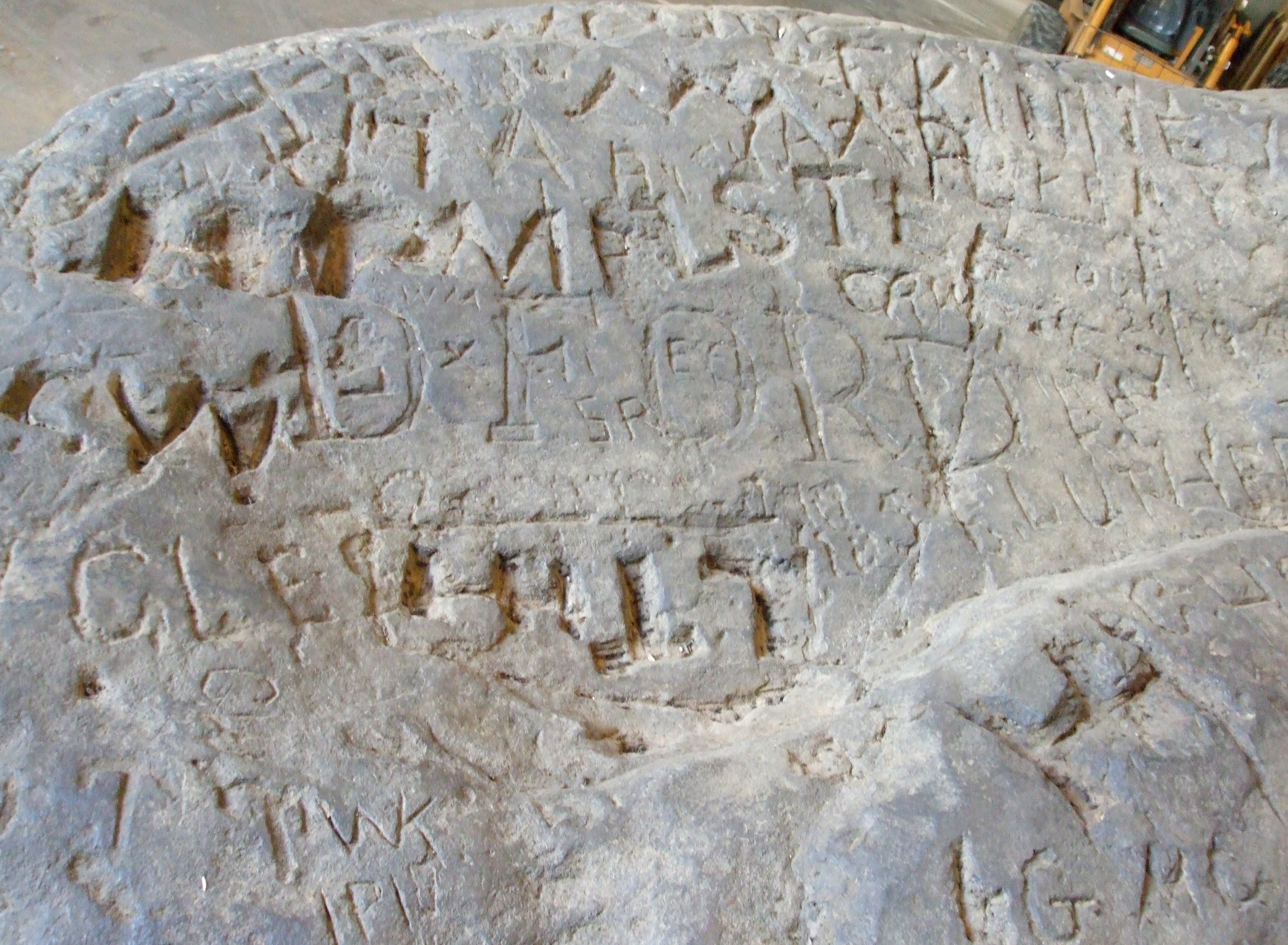
- Material: Sandstone
- Size: 8.0 feet (2.4 m) long by 4.8 feet (1.5 m) wide by 5.0 feet (1.5 m) high
- Writing: Names and initials carved in 1800s and early 1900s
- Discovered: 2007; Ohio River (Kentucky side) opposite Portsmouth, Ohio, River mile 355.3; 38°43′31″N 82°59′35″W
- Discovered by: Steve Shaffer
- Present location: Rotary Park, South Shore, Kentucky 38°43′14″N 82°57′26″W
- Identification: 15 GP 173
- Indian Head Rock Project (Morehead State University) http://scholarworks.moreheadstate.edu/indian_head_rock/

The Indian Head Rock is an eight-ton sandstone boulder, which had rested at the bottom of the Ohio River, until September 2007 when it was retrieved by a group of local divers, led by amateur historian Steve Shaffer of Ironton, Ohio. The recovery of the perennially submerged rock, which was the subject of local lore since the 1800s, was celebrated by Ohio and Kentucky residents in the months that followed. City of Portsmouth, Ohio officials had planned to display the Indian Head Rock in a manner appropriate for the preservation of the historic boulder. However an ensuing interstate dispute led to charges being brought against Shaffer and his fellow divers and a suit demanding the rock be returned to Kentucky. Legal issues were resolved in 2010 and the rock was returned. From 2010 to 2020, the rock was stored in a county highway maintenance garage. In September 2020 it was placed in a small roofed structure enclosed with chain link fencing, despite ongoing concerns that it should be protected in a climate-controlled structure.

The controversy surrounding the salvaging of the Indian Head Rock in 2007 is the subject of a 2017 documentary, "Between the Rock and the Commonwealth." The documentary has been broadcast on public television stations in Ohio and Kentucky since June 2017.

== Etymology ==
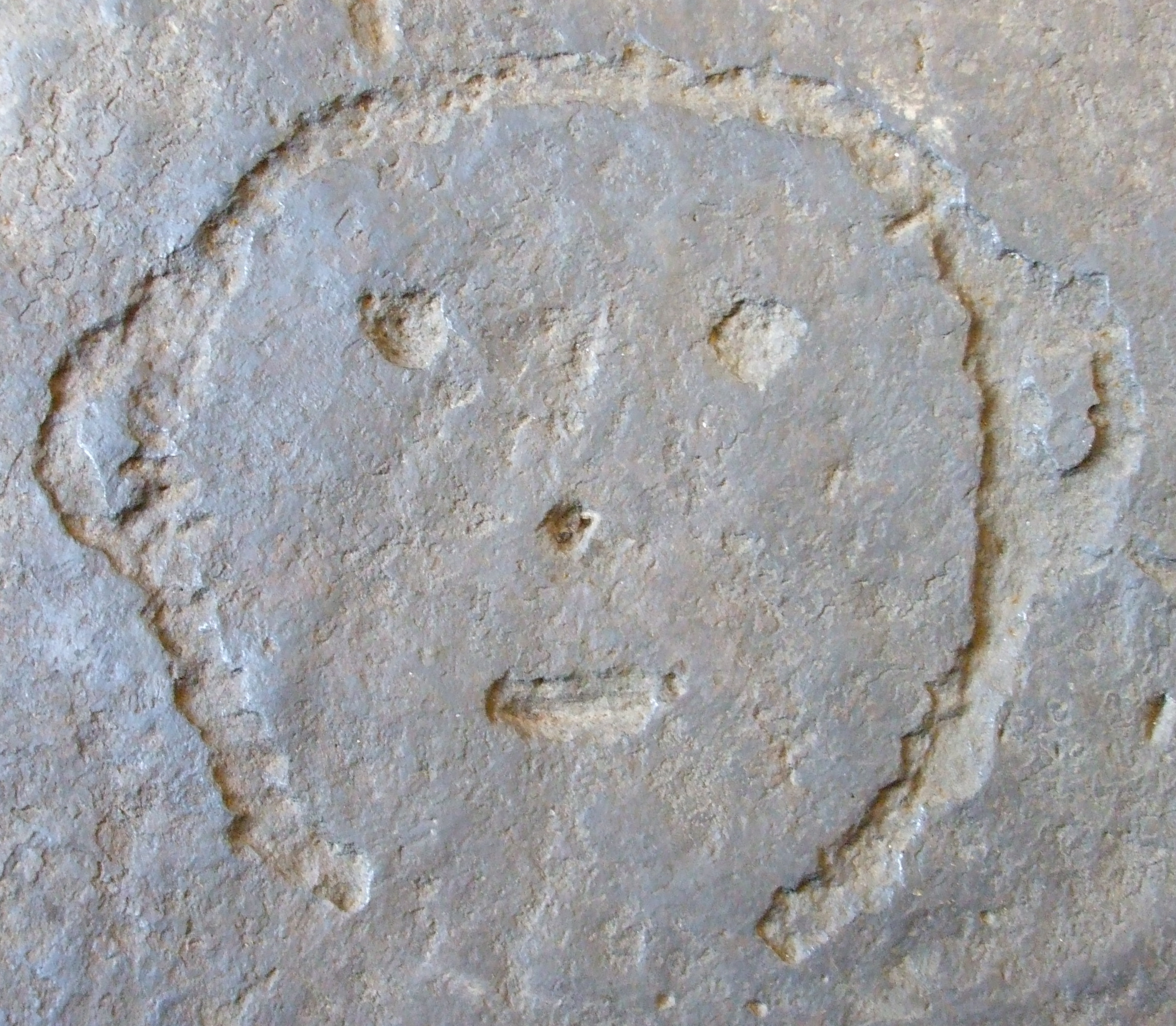
The face on Indian Head Rock. Taken 2008

The name Indian Head Rock comes from a carving on the bottom of the boulder with the features of a human face. It has been theorized that the face was carved by a Native American artist as a petroglyph, a boatman as a river gauge, or was carved by John Book from Portsmouth, Ohio who later fought in the Battle of Shiloh. Other theories include that a band of robbers used it to mark their nearby stash and that a quarryman carved the face with a metal device.

The first surviving historical reference to the boulder by name is from Squier and Davis's Ancient Monuments of the Mississippi Valley (1848). "It is familiarly known as the "Indian's Head," and is regarded as a sort of river gage or meter. When the water-line is at the top of the head, the river is considered very low."

Newspaper reports in the 19th century referred to the boulder as the Indian Head. In the early 20th century, it was referred to as Indian Rock, rather than Indian Head Rock.

The boulder has sometimes been called Portsmouth Indian Head Rock due to its history and proximity to the City of Portsmouth, and to disambiguate it from other "Indian Head" rocks.

== History ==
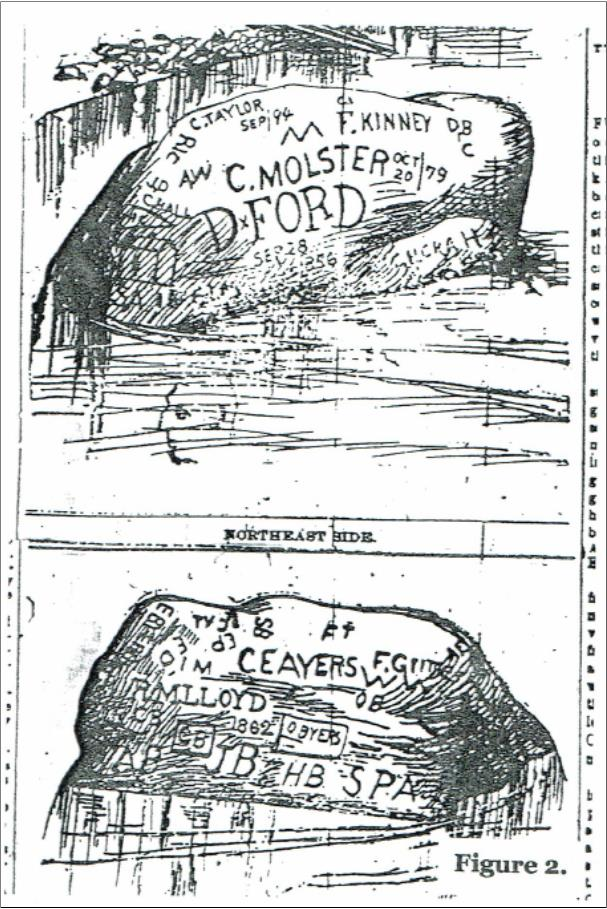
Indian Head Rock-newspaper illustration, Portsmouth Semi-Weekly Blade, 9-22-1894

=== Origin ===
The Indian Head Rock originated as part of "Quaternary Pleistocene and Recent Landslide deposits" from the Kentucky hillside facing the city of Portsmouth. The landslide deposits consist of "unconsolidated angular boulders and finer debris; found at base of steep slopes along Ohio River." An early account of the Indian Head Rock (1891) stated that "The rock is not of the freestone formation of the river bed at this point, but is a hard sandstone, and must have rolled from the top of the hill in remote ages. The face was probably made to commemorate the lowest water ever known in the Ohio river since white men settled upon it." At that time there was already "a multitude of...names and characters, evidently quite ancient" carved in the rock.

The angular surfaces of the boulder were worn smooth over time by the flow of the river. A 1908 newspaper account stated: "That the rock rolled off the hill at some remote period seems assured, as it is of the same formation as the summit of the river hills. It is now smooth as a bowling ball, made so by the motion of the water for generations. Histories of the river of as early a date as 1811 mention its presence."

=== 19th century ===
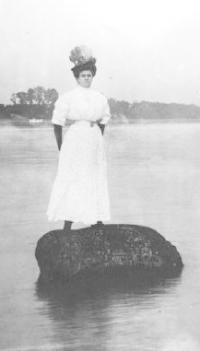
A woman standing on the Indian Head Rock, circa 1894.

The first known reference to the Indian Head Rock was to its use as a gauge of the Ohio River. A log kept by a local resident recorded the river stage with reference to various points on the rock: the mouth or the eyes of the carving or the top of the rock. (E.g., "1849--Sept. 23, top of rock 2 1/2 inches under water", "1851--Sept 27, eyes to be seen--the lowest measure on record from 1839 to this date.", and "1854--Sept. 5, mouth just on the water-line--therefore lower than since 1839.") The first record in the log was dated November 10, 1839, when the mouth of the figure was said to be "10 1/4 inches out of the water."

On July 26, 1851, a Portsmouth newspaper reported that "The river is now within three inches of the Indian Head. This mark is the outline of a human head engraved upon a large rock now but a few feet from shore." The story credited the carving to "pioneers, [who] cut it for a low water mark."

On October 17, 1891, it was reported that the boulder was nearly exposed. "If anyone wants to see the Indian rock...ten or twelve feet from the water's brink, he will see a huge rock through the now transparent water, with a backbone formation extending perhaps an inch above the water--now above and now completely under the water, as the slight wind waves break over it. Under the water can be seen the great brown body of the rock, sloping off on all sides to the bottom."

Later that month, the rock was completely submerged, "...but the water is so clear that the inscriptions carved in the same can be seen as much as two feet below the surface..." Despite the fact that it was underwater, there was "...renewed interest in the historic and mysterious rock." "Every day, and particularly on Sundays, skiffs go over in fleets, and can be seen hovering around the rock in great numbers."

In 1894, a rough illustration of the Indian Head Rock appeared in a Portsmouth newspaper. In the sketch, initials, last names with first initials, and a crude house figure are seen. All of these features are extant on the boulder, but many are now obscured by additional engravings which may not have been present at the time. The rock is depicted several feet from the Kentucky shoreline with the bottom submerged. The "Indian Head" face is depicted just below the waterline, but it is clear the illustrator had not seen the actual face, as it is drawn as a profile. Some of the names shown on the rock are identified with historically prominent Portsmouth residents or families, e.g., F. Kinney, C. Molster and D. Ford.

=== 20th century ===
In September and October 1908, the Ohio River was at an unusually low level, allowing exceptional access to the Indian Head Rock by local residents. The Portsmouth Daily Times reported that over 1000 people ventured out to the rock on Sunday, September 27, 1908. "It is said that over 1000 people viewed the Indian Rock near the Kentucky shore opposite Bond street, Sunday, the water being so low that the historic relic is now plainly visible to the naked eye." The Times also reported that 1,500 people visited the rock on Sunday, October 11, 1908. "Fifteen hundred people visited the Indian Rock yesterday. Every gasoline launch on the river front was in commission."

The newspaper also reported that "J. E. Bradford, well known amateur photographer of 336 Robinson avenue, has obtained some of the finest pictures of the famous Indian Rock in the Ohio that have been so far exhibited. He has made them post card size, just the thing for sending away to former Portsmouth people. At least a hundred sets of initials are easily distinguishable upon his pictures."

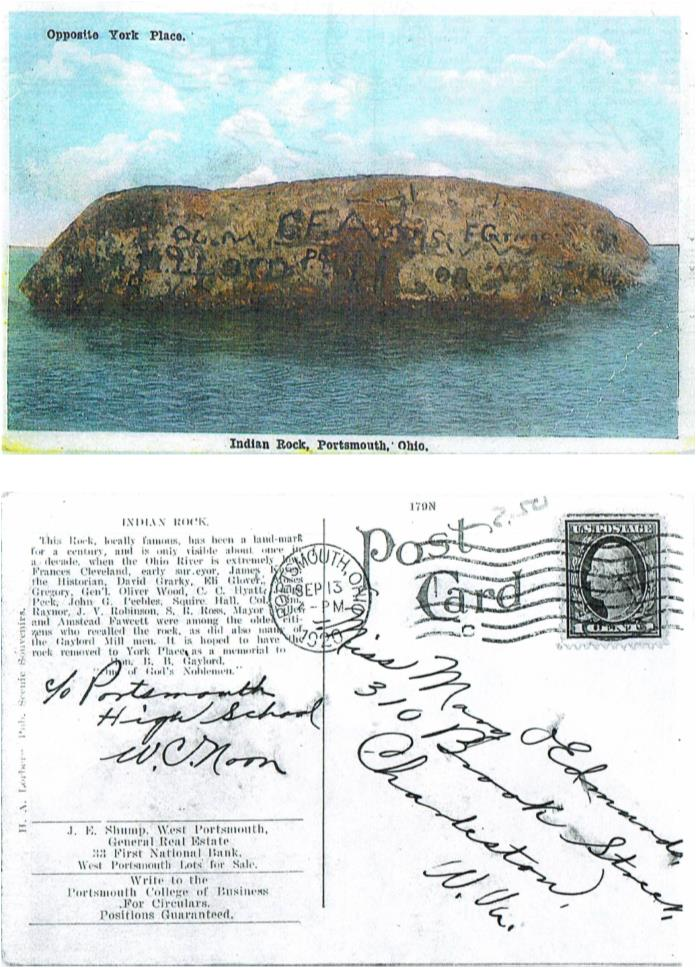
Early 20th c. postcard, featuring Indian Head Rock. Description (back) states: "Indian Rock: This Rock, locally famous, has been a landmark for a century..."

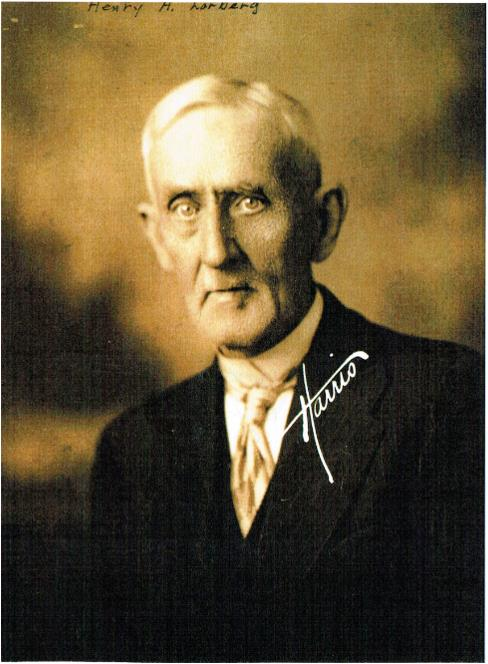
Portsmouth historian and entrepreneur, Henry Lorberg, promoted the Indian Head Rock as a "historic bowlder."

==== Henry Lorberg ====
The low water levels of 1908 inspired a proposal to preserve the Indian Head Rock by removing it from the river and displaying it in a popular riverfront park in Portsmouth. The proposal was by Henry A. Lorberg (1856-1943), a well-known Portsmouth historian and benefactor of the time. "Henry Lorberg is going to communicate with the light house department with a view to having the snag boat Woodruff pull up the Indian rock, the idea of Mr. Lorberg being to have the city place the historic bowlder [sic] in York park, in a position overlooking the river, with an iron railing around it and a history of the rock, as far as obtainable, engraved or painted on the face. The wonder is the government hasn't pulled the rock out of its place long ago and crushed it with dynamite, as it is an undoubted menace to navigation of the river between five and fifteen feet. The bottom of many a boat and barge was torn out by it in the old days when steamboats were plentiful...Portsmouth is the River City and to preserve the rock in the manner referred to would be highly appropriate." This story credited the carving of the face on the rock to a Portsmouth resident in the 1830s. "The man or boy, who did the carving is reputed to have been John Book, an older half-brother of W. T. Book, of East Eighth street. Book was a very adventurous boy and grew to be one of the best known citizens of the county and state was a captain in the civil war and killed in battle. He carved the face some time in the thirties." Clearly, Lorberg's proposal was not acted upon.

Lorberg wrote about the Indian Head Rock in one of his histories of the City of Portsmouth. "Indian Rock on the Kentucky shore opposite Court Street, could be seen in 1875...Many young men carved their initials on it, and an Indian head was also cut in the stone. The Rock could only be seen when the Ohio was extremely low--about once in a decade; but since the River Dams have been built, it is now entirely out of view, and has probably been seen for the last time by the present generation. It served as a good diving point for boys who went swimming in the River. Henry Bannon’s History of Scioto County gives a more detailed description of the rock."

Between 1875 and 1929, the US Army Corps of Engineers built a series of dams on the Ohio River to improve navigation. Ohio River Lock and Dam No. 31, 2.5 miles (4.0 km) downstream of Portsmouth, was completed in 1917, permanently raising the river level. As a result the Indian Head Rock was permanently submerged, except for a brief period in 1920, due to damage to Lock and Dam No. 31 (see below). (With the completion of the Captain Anthony Meldahl Locks and Dam downstream in December 1964, Lock and Dam No. 31 was rendered obsolete and was demolished shortly thereafter.)

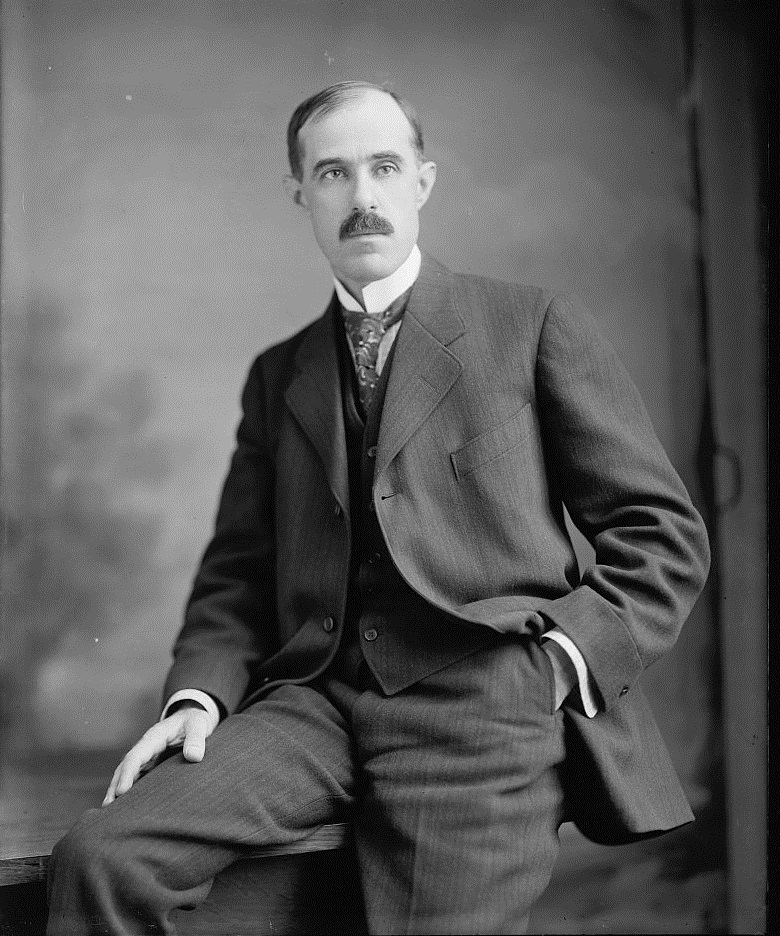
U.S. Representative from Portsmouth, Ohio, Henry T. Bannon photographed and documented the history of Indian Head Rock

==== Congressman Henry T. Bannon ====
In October 1920, or shortly before, a passing steamboat damaged the downstream dam (No. 31). The incident coincided with an unusually low water level in the Ohio River. As a result, the Indian Head Rock was exposed for the first and only time since the completion of the dam until the rock's recovery in 2007. The boulder's reappearance drew the attention of Portsmouth attorney, business, and former US Congressman Henry T. Bannon (1867-1950). The rock was only partially exposed with the carved face remaining underwater. Bannon described his encounter with the historic rock in a paper published the journal of the Ohio State Archaeological and Historical Society. This description is the first known scholarly discussion of the artifact. Bannon reported that "As no picture or accurate description of the Indian's head [i.e., the carved face, rather than the rock itself] was in existence, my brother, Arthur H. Bannon, determined to secure a photograph of it, if possible. On October 22, 1920, the top of the sculpture was about six inches beneath the surface of the river so a plan to bring it into view for a photograph had to be devised. That was accomplished by running a motor boat past the rock at very fast speed. As the boat drew the water away from the rock, a photograph was obtained of the sculpture. The difficulties in the way of a clear photograph were many, for the photographer was obliged to stand in the water and take the picture instantaneously, when the water was at its lowest ebb, and while water was still running down the side of the rock." Several attempts were required to get a good photo. Bannon's paper described some inscriptions on the rock that had been unknown previously. Bannon concluded that "Such was the only time, within the memory of any living man, that the Indian's head has been seen, except when covered with water. In all probability neither the Indian's head, nor the rock upon which it is cut, will ever be seen again, as it is hardly within the realms of chance that the dam will be broken at such an opportune time." The photo that the pair took so industriously and a photo of Bannon's party posing with the rock were published along with the paper.

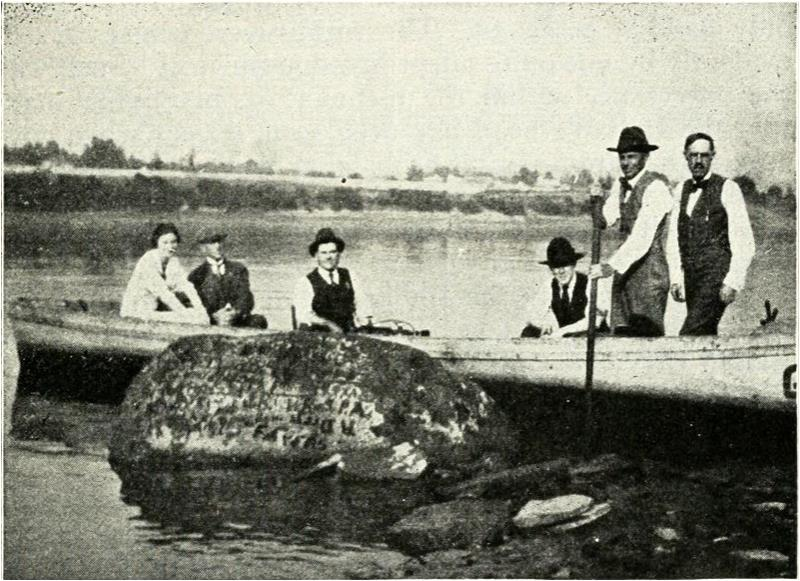
Historian and former congressman Henry T. Bannon (far right) visits Indian Head Rock in 1920. City of Portsmouth, Ohio, in background.

The October 1920 appearance of the Indian Head Rock drew considerable attention from other local residents as well. The Portsmouth Daily Times reported that "Hundreds of Portsmouth people Sunday took advantage of an opportunity to view the famous Indian Rock, which is located just across from the old [Portsmouth] waterworks plant. Many pictures of it were taken from all angles Sunday."

Bannon included his account of the event with some elaboration in his 1927 history of Scioto County, "Stories Old and Often Told, being Chronicles of Scioto County, Ohio."

In 2009, a grandson of Henry T. Bannon, Towne Bannon, related a story that he had heard from his grandfather. During a period of low river levels in the 1890s, Portsmouth Common Pleas Judge James Bannon learned that three new sets of initials, HB, AB, and JB, had appeared on the rock, defacing earlier carvings. The judge concluded that his sons, Henry, Arthur and Jim were the culprits. He scolded them for this act of vandalism, and told them not to admit publicly to the carvings. The three sets of initials are still extant on the rock and are visible in an 1894 sketch of the rock, published in a local newspaper.

The Indian Head Rock was not seen again until its retrieval in 2007.

=== 21st century ===
==== Recovery of Indian Head Rock ====
Steve Shaffer of Ironton, Ohio (30 miles (48 km) from Portsmouth), is an amateur historian with an interest in the study and preservation of prehistoric petroglyphs in the Ohio River Valley. Shaffer had first read about the Indian Head Rock in the sixth grade and had researched its history as an adult. In the summer of 2000, Shaffer began trying to locate the rock with a team of divers from Huntington, West Virginia. After numerous dives, the rock was located and photographed in 2002. By 2007, Shaffer had assembled a team of divers from Portsmouth and Huntington with plans to recover the rock. The rock was lifted by inflatable air bags and floated to shore where it was retrieved by a large crane on September 9. "[A] cheering crowd of locals gathered to watch" the removal which was covered by local news media. Shaffer stated that "Both the re-discovery and recovery of the Indian's Head Rock were important, pointing out no other single artifact from the region represents so much of the area's pre-history and history. It was a wonderful project, and obviously one that wouldn't be hurried. Raising the Indian's Head Rock is also an example of grassroots preservation teamwork at its best. I'm happy to have been a part of it, and I'm glad Portsmouth's future generations will be able to see and ponder the Indian's Head as well." Shaffer said his team's goal was to preserve the rock and place it on public display.

On September 20, 2008, over 1000 people attended a public ceremony commemorating the rock's recovery. "Curious area residents and fans of the now-famous Indian Head Rock gathered at the Portsmouth city service garage Thursday, for a celebration of the rock and its history." Historic documents and photographs were displayed. Students from local schools were in attendance as well, and a $500 college scholarship was awarded to the winner of an essay contest.

==== Removal disputes ====
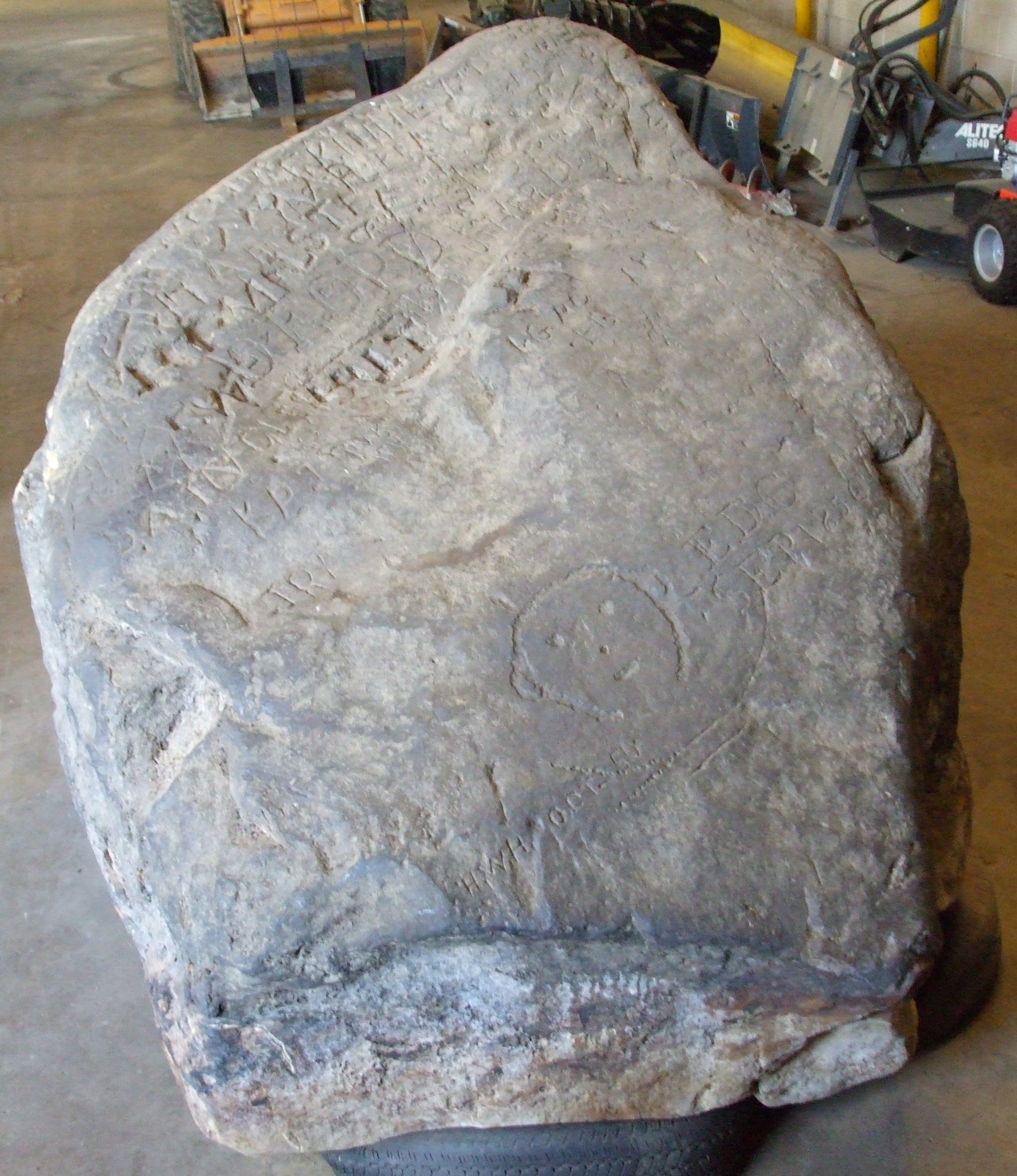
Indian Head Rock. (Note the name carvings) Taken 2008.

The State of Kentucky claimed ownership of the Indian Head Rock by virtue of its original location in the Ohio River, i.e., on the Kentucky side of the border between the two states, and due to the rock's inclusion in a registry of Kentucky antiquities. Due to this ownership claim, Greenup County, Kentucky Commonwealth's Attorney Cliff Duvall determined that Shaffer's removal of the rock from the river may have violated Kentucky's Antiquity Act, a Class D felony which carries a sentence of one to five years in state prison. On June 19, 2008, a Greenup County grand jury issued an indictment against Shaffer for violating the Kentucky's Antiquity Act by removing Indian Head Rock, which was registered by the University of Kentucky as a protected archaeological object in 1986, without a permit. In addition, Judge William Marshall of the Scioto County Court of Common Pleas sustained an earlier ruling by Greenup County Circuit Judge Bob Conley that then-Portsmouth, Ohio Mayor Jim Kalb and witness Bill Glockner were material witnesses in the case. Based on these rulings, Marshall ordered both men to appear before the Greeunp County grand jury. Kalb and Glockner were scheduled to testify on July 24, 2008.

On Thursday, July 24, 2008, Shaffer appeared before Conley for arraignment in Greenup County Circuit Court. He agreed to appear before the court to avoid being extradited from Ohio. Shaffer's attorney, Michael Curtis, entered a plea of not guilty on Shaffer's behalf to the charge of removing a state registered antiquity without a permit. Shaffer was released on a $5000 signature bond. A pre-trial hearing was set for October 16, 2008. In addition, Duvall announced that the grand jury had also issued an indictment against diver David Vetter of Portsmouth. Vetter was also charged with one count of violating the Kentucky Antiquity Act. Duvall stated that along with the indictments; the grand jury, which has since expired, issued a recommendation that future grand juries continue the investigation.

==== States ====
The removal of the rock also led to a legislative battle between the states of Kentucky and Ohio. On January 8, 2008, Representative Reginald Meeks introduced House Resolution 12 in the Kentucky General Assembly. The Resolution reads, "Condemn the removal of Indian Head Rock to the city of Portsmouth, Ohio, and urge the city of Portsmouth to return the rock to its original location" on the bottom of the Ohio River. On January 22, 2008, House Resolution 12 was adopted by a voice vote.

The Kentucky Native American Heritage Council, of which Meeks is a member-at-large, passed a resolution on November 1, 2007, also calling for the return of Indian Head Rock to its original location, i.e., the Ohio River bottom.

In response in May 2008, Ohio Representative Todd Book, along with sixty-six co-sponsors, introduced and adopted House Resolution No. 137 in the 127th Ohio General Assembly Regular Session. It was resolved, "That we, the members of the House of Representatives of the 127th General Assembly of the State of Ohio, declare that the Portsmouth Indian Head Rock is and has always been inextricably linked to the history of the City of Portsmouth, Ohio, and that it represents an important facet of Ohio's historical connection to the Ohio River, and be it further resolved, That we, the members of the House of Representatives of the 127th General Assembly of the State of Ohio, call upon the Commonwealth of Kentucky to abandon any claims of ownership to the Portsmouth Indian Head Rock and to work with Ohio officials to jointly care for, preserve, and educate the public about the history of the Portsmouth Indian Head Rock and, through such joint action, promote our shared and common history, and be it further resolved, That the Clerk of the House of Representatives transmit duly authenticated copies of this resolution to the Clerk of the House of Representatives of the Commonwealth of Kentucky, the Ohio Historical Society, the Kentucky Historical Society, and the news media of Ohio and Kentucky".

On April 6, 2009, Senior United States District Judge Henry R. Wilhoit Jr. of the Eastern District of Kentucky in Ashland granted motions by the attorneys for Steven R. Shaffer and David G. Vetter to stay the claims against their clients. Wilhoit also ordered that the case be held in abeyance "in its entirety" until after the resolution of the criminal cases.

=== Resolution ===
On July 24, 2009, Duvall filed a motion to dismiss the criminal charges against Shaffer and Vetter. According to Duvall, there has been more than one rock in the river known as "Indian Head Rock" or "Indian Rock" and there is confusion over which is the "official" one. In his 12-page motion, Duvall said he was dropping the case because he would not able to prove beyond a reasonable doubt that the 8-ton boulder that Shaffer and his associates pulled out of the river in September 2007 is, in fact, the same Indian Head Rock that was registered with the University of Kentucky as a protected archaeological object in the mid-1980s. "The official Indian Head Rock cannot be in several places at once," the motion states. According to Duvall, Shaffer would still face other consequences for his actions, including being cited by the U.S. Army Corps of Engineers for undertaking a dredging operation without a permit. Judge Conley granted the motion and dismissed the charges on July 30, 2009.

On July 8, 2010 WFPL reported that a settlement had been reached allowing the rock to be brought to Kentucky and stored. The rock was returned to Kentucky on November 4, 2010 and, until September 2020, was stored in a storage shed in Greenup County. It was determined that the rock would not be returned to its original location in the river because the original site "had been compromised."

== Fate of Indian Head Rock ==
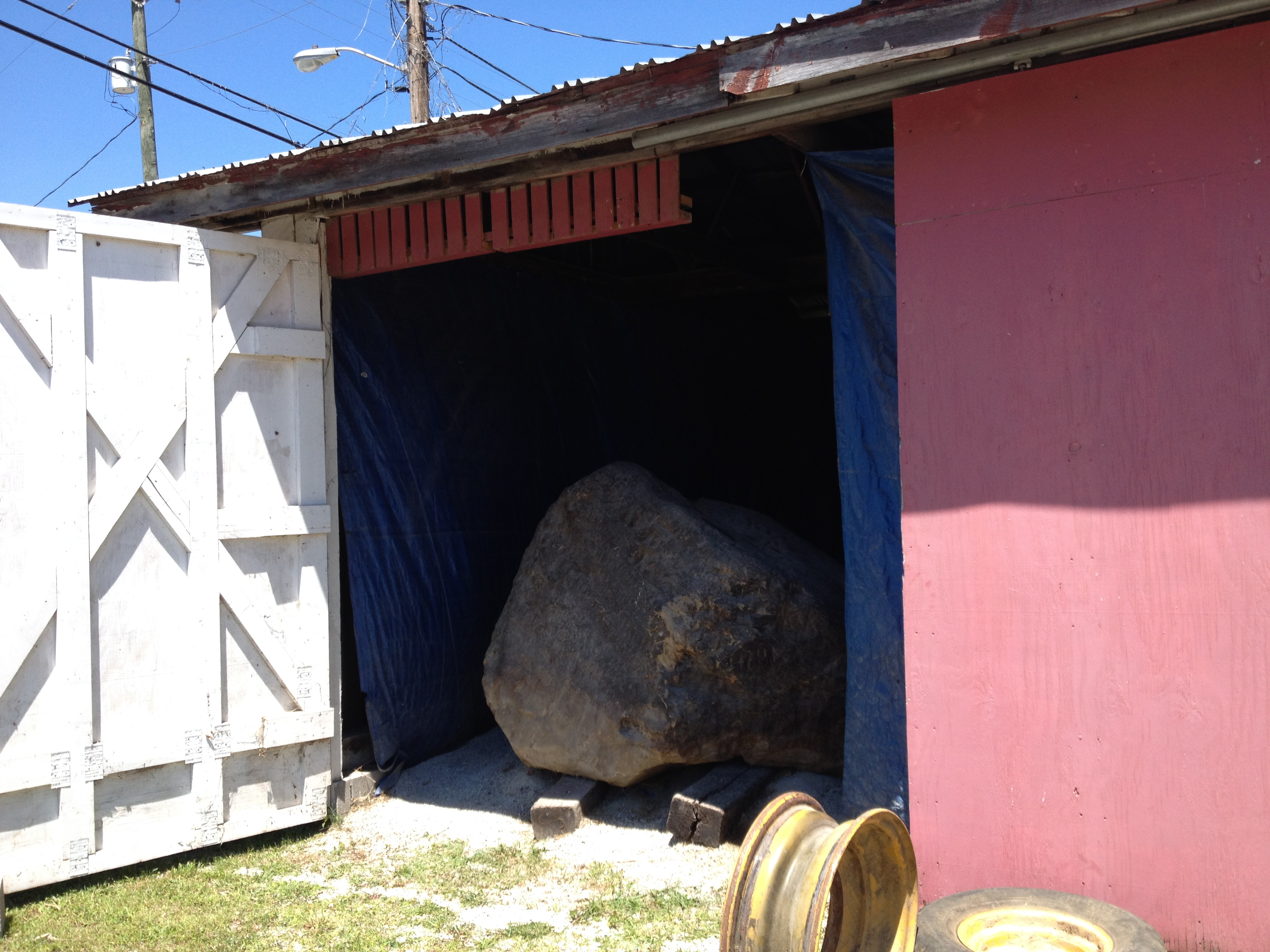
Indian Head Rock in storage, Greenup County, KY. (2010-September 2020)

A reporter who visited the garage in which the Indian Head Rock was stored in 2015 described its setting at the time. "There it squats in the county garage in Greenup, eight tons of sandstone surrounded by worn-out tractor tires and crusted with four years worth of cobwebs and grit. The trouble is, no one knows where else to put it. It's too bulky and heavy to move without heavy equipment and not pretty enough to capture admiring glances...There was talk of putting it in a park in South Shore, near where the rock was lifted from the water. Greenup County Judge-Executive Bobby Carpenter still thinks that is a good idea, although he's not sure about the details. Whether the rock would be better displayed al fresco or under a roof is debatable, he said. And if a structure is to be built, could South Shore afford it? Until those questions, and others, are answered, the rock likely will remain in its garage limbo."

In April 2019, Greenup County Judge-Executive Bobby Carpenter announced plans to spend up to $5,000 for a gazebo and concrete pad upon which to display the Indian head Rock in a South Shore park. Carpenter expressed concern that the sandstone surface of the boulder is "exhibiting signs of fragility." The plan to display the rock will include "some means of securing the rock from mischief" since it "could be vulnerable to vandals."

In September 2020, the Indian Head Rock was placed on public display at a park in South Shore, Kentucky, on a covered platform protected by chain link fencing.

=== Documentary: Between the Rock and the Commonwealth ===
Steven Middleton, a Morehead State University instructor and filmmaker, learned of the interstate custody battle for the Indian Head Rock while making a series of documentaries about Kentucky and Appalachia. After researching the rock and viewing it in a tiny county storage shed, Middleton decided to make a film about it. Middleton believes that the current inaccessibility of the rock is not in the best interests of the public. His film, Between the Rock and the Commonwealth, was completed in 2017, and has been broadcast on public television stations in Kentucky and Ohio since June 2017.
