= Martin Hoke =

American politician

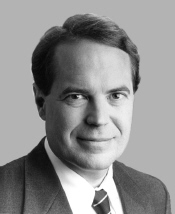

Member of the U.S. House of Representatives from Ohio's 10th district
- In office January 3, 1993 – January 3, 1997
- Preceded by: Mary Rose Oakar (redistricted)
- Succeeded by: Dennis Kucinich

Personal details
- Born: Martin Rossiter Hoke; May 18, 1952 (age 74) Lakewood, Ohio, U.S.
- Party: Republican
- Education: Amherst College (BA); Case Western Reserve University (JD)

Martin Rossiter Hoke (born May 18, 1952) is an American Republican politician, former member of the Ohio Casino Control Commission, and former member of the United States House of Representatives from Ohio.

== Early life ==
Hoke was born in Lakewood, Ohio, and attended school at the private Western Reserve Academy. He graduated from Amherst College in 1973 and earned a J.D. degree from Case Western Reserve University in 1980. He has been noted for practicing Sikhism.

== Career ==
In 1981, Hoke began a company, Red Carpet Airport Car Care, that provided auto repair services at Cleveland Hopkins International Airport. Four years later, he founded Red Carpet Cellular, a distributor of then-novel cellular telephones, which became the largest distributor of cell phones in Ohio. Hoke sold the company to British Petroleum in 1988. Bell Atlantic acquired the company in 1991.

=== Election ===
In 1992, Hoke won the Republican nomination for Ohio's 10th congressional district, located in Cleveland's west side. Hoke upset heavily favored Democrat Mary Rose Oakar, who had represented the district (formerly the 20th District) for 16 years, in the general election. Oakar was hampered by writing bad checks at the House of Representatives Bank, one of many members who were entangled in the House banking scandal. Hoke was the first Republican to represent a significant portion of traditionally heavily Democratic Cleveland in over 30 years.

=== Controversy ===
Following the 1994 State of the Union speech by President Bill Clinton, Hoke was preparing to be interviewed for a live broadcast for a local Cleveland television station. After being outfitted with a microphone by a female producer, Hoke remarked to Democratic fellow Cleveland-area congressman Eric Fingerhut that "She's got ze beega breasts" in a mock Italian accent. Although not broadcast live, the remark was recorded, and was the subject of a report by The Washington Post the following day. Coverage of the remark may have been a factor in his failed bid for re-election in 1996.

=== Defeat ===
Hoke won re-election in 1994 against Frank Gaul, a Cuyahoga County Treasurer who had recently overseen losses in a county bond fund based on faulty advice from private bond counsel. In 1996, Hoke was defeated by former Cleveland mayor Dennis Kucinich 49%-46%. Hoke was harmed by several gaffes he had made, the Democratic nature of the district, strong labor support for Kucinich, and a mounting public perception that he would lose.

=== Post-political career ===
In 2007, Hoke developed an idea for a nasal irrigation system, partly to allay his own sinusitis. His creation evolved into Rhinosystems, Inc. of Brooklyn, Ohio, manufacturer of the patented Navage nasal irrigator, currently sold in Canada and the United States. In 2020, New York Magazine rated Navage the “Best Nasal Irrigation System.”

Hoke was appointed to the Ohio Casino Control Commission by Governor John Kasich on February 23, 2011. His term of office ended on February 21, 2017.

== See also ==
- Ohio's 10th congressional district

U.S. House of Representatives
Preceded by Clarence E. Miller; Redistricted	Member of the U.S. House of Representatives from Ohio's 10th congressional district 1993–1997	Succeeded by Dennis Kucinich
U.S. order of precedence (ceremonial)
Preceded by Robert Weygand as Former U.S. Representative	Order of precedence of the United States as Former U.S. Representative	Succeeded by Zack Space as Former U.S. Representative
