= Robert M. Switzer =

American politician

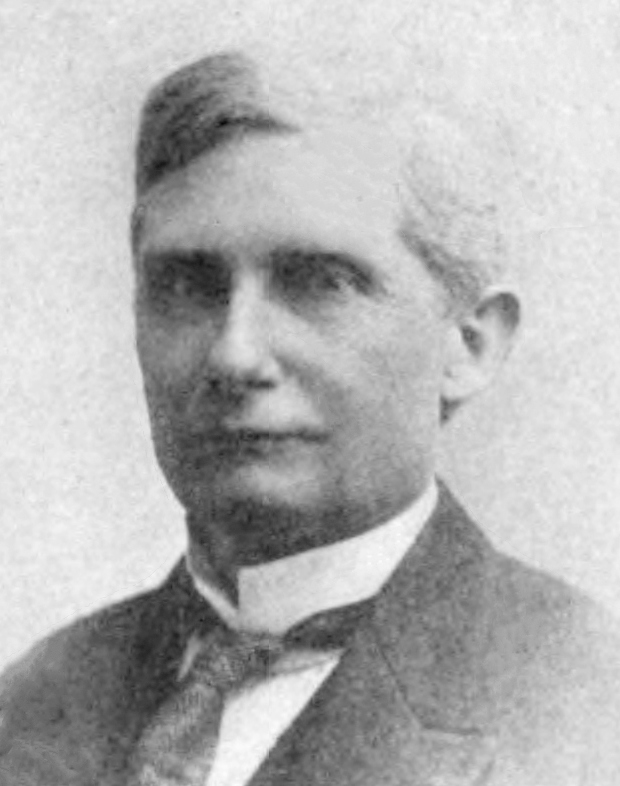

Member of the U.S. House of Representatives from Ohio's 10th district
- In office March 4, 1911 – March 3, 1919
- Preceded by: Adna R. Johnson
- Succeeded by: Israel Moore Foster

Personal details
- Born: Robert Mauck Switzer; March 6, 1863 Gallipolis, Ohio
- Died: October 28, 1952 (aged 89) Gallipolis, Ohio
- Resting place: Mound Hill Cemetery
- Party: Republican
- Education: Rio Grande College; University of Virginia School of Law; Ohio State University College of Law

Robert Mauck Switzer (March 6, 1863 – October 28, 1952) was an American educator, lawyer and politician who served four terms as a U.S. representative from Ohio from 1911 to 1919.

== Biography ==
=== Early life ===
Born near Gallipolis, Ohio, Robert Switzer attended the district schools, Gallia Academy, and Rio Grande College. He attended the law departments of the University of Virginia at Charlottesville and the Ohio State University of Columbus.

=== Career ===
He taught school from 1883 to 1887. He then served as Deputy Sheriff of Gallia County from 1888 to 1892.

He was admitted to the bar in 1892 and commenced practice in Gallipolis, Ohio. He served as prosecuting attorney of Gallia County 1893-1900. He served as delegate to the Republican National Conventions in 1900 and 1920.

=== Congress ===
He was elected as a Republican to the Sixty-second and to the three succeeding Congresses (March 4, 1911 – March 3, 1919). He served on the Subcommittee of the Committee on Mines and Mining which investigated the Copper Country Strike of 1913–14. He was an unsuccessful candidate for renomination in 1918 to the Sixty-sixth Congress. He also served as City solicitor of Gallipolis, Ohio.

He then resumed the practice of law.

=== Death ===
He died in Gallipolis, Ohio, on October 28, 1952, and he was interred in Mound Hill Cemetery.

== Sources ==
- United States Congress. "Robert M. Switzer (id: S001124)". Biographical Directory of the United States Congress.

U.S. House of Representatives
Preceded by Adna R. Johnson	Member of the U.S. House of Representatives from Ohio's 10th congressional district March 4, 1911 – March 4, 1919	Succeeded by Israel M. Foster
