= Israel Moore Foster =

American politician (1873–1950)

Israel M. Foster
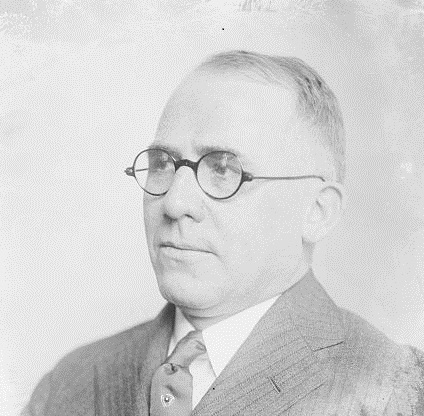
- 1921 or 1922

Member of the U.S. House of Representatives from Ohio's 10th district
- In office March 4, 1919 – March 3, 1925
- Preceded by: Robert M. Switzer
- Succeeded by: Thomas A. Jenkins

Personal details
- Born: Israel Moore Foster; January 12, 1873 Athens, Ohio, U.S.
- Died: June 10, 1950 (aged 77) Washington, D.C., U.S.
- Resting place: Rock Creek Cemetery; Washington, D.C., U.S.
- Party: Republican
- Education: Ohio University; Harvard Law School; Ohio State University College of Law

Israel Moore Foster (January 12, 1873 – June 10, 1950) was a Republican Representative in the United States Congress from the state of Ohio, serving three terms from 1919 to 1925.

== Biography ==
Born in Athens, Ohio, Foster attended the public schools, and graduated from the Ohio University at Athens in 1895. He studied law at the Harvard Law School in 1895 and 1896, and graduated from the Ohio State Law School in 1898, commencing practice the same year in Athens, Ohio.

He served as prosecuting attorney of Athens County from 1902 to 1910. He served as member and secretary of the board of trustees of the Ohio University for twenty-four years, and was Secretary of the Republican State central committee in 1912.

=== Congress ===
Foster was elected as a Republican to the Sixty-sixth, Sixty-seventh, and Sixty-eighth Congresses (March 4, 1919 – March 4, 1925). He was an unsuccessful candidate for renomination in 1924. While in Congress, he is best known for proposing the Child Labor Amendment to the United States Constitution.

=== Later career ===
After serving in Congress, he was appointed a commissioner of the court of claims on April 1, 1925, and served until April 1, 1942, when he retired.

== Death and legacy ==
He died in Washington, D.C., and is buried in Washington's Rock Creek Cemetery.

He had a residence hall at Ohio University named after him, it was located on South Green. Ohio University administration demolish the building in 2016.

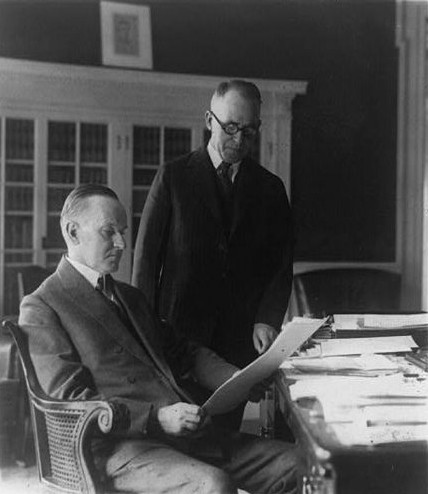
Calvin Coolidge seated at desk, with congressman Israel Moore Foster

== Sources ==
- United States Congress. "Israel Moore Foster (id: F000306)". Biographical Directory of the United States Congress.

U.S. House of Representatives
Preceded by Robert M. Switzer	Member of the U.S. House of Representatives from Ohio's 10th congressional district March 4, 1919–March 3, 1925	Succeeded by Thomas A. Jenkins
