= Ohio's 10th congressional district =

U.S. House district for Ohio

Coordinates: 39°42′05″N 83°57′32″W

- Interactive map of district boundaries
- Representative: Mike Turner; R–Dayton
- Population (2025): 798,357
- Median household income: $72,471
- Ethnicity: 70.7% White; 17.2% Black; 5.1% Two or more races; 3.8% Hispanic; 2.4% Asian; 0.7% other
- Cook PVI: R+3

Ohio's 10th congressional district is represented by Representative Mike Turner (R). The district is based in southwestern Ohio and consists of Montgomery County, Greene County, and a portion of Clark County. The cities of Dayton, Centerville, Xenia, and Springfield are part of the district.

== Recent election results from statewide races ==
=== 2023-2027 boundaries ===
Year	Office	Results
2008	President	Obama 50% - 48%
2012	President	Romney 50.03% - 49.97%
2016	President	Trump 51% - 45%
2016	Senate	Portman 60% - 36%
2018	Senate	Brown 53% - 47%
2018	Governor	DeWine 52% - 45%
2018	Secretary of State	LaRose 51% - 47%
2018	Treasurer	Sprague 53% - 47%
2018	Auditor	Faber 51% - 45%
2018	Attorney General	Yost 53% - 47%
2020	President	Trump 51% - 47%
2022	Senate	Vance 52% - 48%
2022	Governor	DeWine 62% - 38%
2022	Secretary of State	LaRose 58% - 41%
2022	Treasurer	Sprague 57% - 43%
2022	Auditor	Faber 58% - 42%
2022	Attorney General	Yost 59% - 41%
2024	President	Trump 52% - 47%
2024	Senate	Brown 49% - 48%

=== 2027–2033 boundaries ===
Year	Office	Results
2008	President	McCain 49.6% - 48.9%
2012	President	Romney 51% - 49%
2016	President	Trump 52% - 43%
2016	Senate	Portman 61% - 35%
2018	Senate	Brown 52% - 48%
2018	Governor	DeWine 53% - 44%
2018	Attorney General	Yost 54% - 46%
2020	President	Trump 52% - 46%
2022	Senate	Vance 53% - 47%
2022	Governor	DeWine 63% - 37%
2022	Secretary of State	LaRose 58% - 41%
2022	Treasurer	Sprague 58% - 42%
2022	Auditor	Faber 59% - 41%
2022	Attorney General	Yost 60% - 40%
2024	President	Trump 53% - 46%
2024	Senate	Moreno 49% - 48%

== Composition ==
For the 118th and successive Congresses (based on redistricting following the 2020 census), the district contains all or portions of the following counties, townships, and municipalities:

Clark County (23)

Clifton (shared with Greene County), Enon, Green Township, Mad River Township (part; also 15th), Springfield, Springfield Township

Greene County (23)

All 23 townships and municipalities

Montgomery County (31)

All 31 townships and municipalities

== List of members representing the district ==
Member	Party	Years	Cong ress	Electoral history	Counties represented
District established March 4, 1823
John Patterson (St. Clairsville)	Adams-Clay; Democratic-Republican	March 4, 1823 – March 3, 1825	18th	Elected in 1822. Lost re-election.	
David Jennings (St. Clairsville)	Anti-Jacksonian	March 4, 1825 – May 25, 1826	19th	Elected in 1824. Resigned.	
Vacant		May 25, 1826 – December 4, 1826	19th		
Thomas Shannon (Barnesville)	Anti-Jacksonian	December 4, 1826 – March 3, 1827	19th	Elected to finish Jennings's term. Retired.	
John Davenport (Barnesville)	Anti-Jacksonian	March 4, 1827 – March 3, 1829	20th	Elected in 1826. Lost re-election.	
William Kennon Sr. (St. Clairsville)	Jacksonian	March 4, 1829 – March 3, 1833	21st 22nd	Elected in 1828. Re-elected in 1830. [data missing]	
Joseph Vance (Urbana)	Anti-Jacksonian	March 4, 1833 – March 3, 1835	23rd	Redistricted from the 4th district and re-elected in 1832. [data missing]	
Samson Mason (Springfield)	Anti-Jacksonian	March 4, 1835 – March 3, 1837	24th 25th 26th 27th	Elected in 1834. Re-elected in 1836. Re-elected in 1838. Re-elected in 1840. [data missing]	
Samson Mason (Springfield)	Whig	March 4, 1837 – March 3, 1843	24th 25th 26th 27th	Elected in 1834. Re-elected in 1836. Re-elected in 1838. Re-elected in 1840. [data missing]	
Heman A. Moore (Columbus)	Democratic	March 4, 1843 – April 3, 1844	28th	Elected in 1843. Died.	
Vacant		April 3, 1844 – October 8, 1844	28th		
Alfred P. Stone (Columbus)	Democratic	October 8, 1844 – March 3, 1845	28th	Elected to finish Moore's term. Retired.	
Columbus Delano (Mount Vernon)	Whig	March 4, 1845 – March 3, 1847	29th	Elected in 1844. [data missing]	
Daniel Duncan (Newark)	Whig	March 4, 1847 – March 3, 1849	30th	Elected in 1846. [data missing]	
Charles Sweetser (Delaware)	Democratic	March 4, 1849 – March 3, 1853	31st 32nd	Elected in 1848. Re-elected in 1850. [data missing]	
John L. Taylor (Chillicothe)	Whig	March 4, 1853 – March 3, 1855	33rd	Redistricted from the 8th district and re-elected in 1852. [data missing]	
Oscar F. Moore (Portsmouth)	Anti-Nebraska	March 4, 1855 – March 3, 1857	34th	Elected in 1854. [data missing]	
Joseph Miller (Chillicothe)	Democratic	March 4, 1857 – March 3, 1859	35th	Elected in 1856. [data missing]	
Carey A. Trimble (Chillicothe)	Republican	March 4, 1859 – March 3, 1863	36th 37th	Elected in 1858. Re-elected in 1860. [data missing]	
James Mitchell Ashley (Toledo)	Republican	March 4, 1863 – March 3, 1869	38th 39th 40th	Redistricted from the 5th district and re-elected in 1862. Re-elected in 1864. Re-elected in 1866. [data missing]	
Truman H. Hoag (Toledo)	Democratic	March 4, 1869 – February 5, 1870	41st	Elected in 1868. Died.	
Vacant		February 5, 1870 – April 23, 1870	41st		
Erasmus D. Peck (Perrysburg)	Republican	April 23, 1870 – March 3, 1873	41st 42nd	Elected to finish Hoag's term. Re-elected in 1870. [data missing]	
Charles Foster (Fostoria)	Republican	March 4, 1873 – March 3, 1879	43rd 44th 45th	Redistricted from the 9th district and re-elected in 1872. Re-elected in 1874. Re-elected in 1876. [data missing]	
Thomas Ewing Jr. (Lancaster)	Democratic	March 4, 1879 – March 3, 1881	46th	Redistricted from the 12th district and re-elected in 1878. [data missing]	
John B. Rice (Fremont)	Republican	March 4, 1881 – March 3, 1883	47th	Elected in 1880. [data missing]	
Frank H. Hurd (Toledo)	Democratic	March 4, 1883 – March 3, 1885	48th	Elected in 1882. [data missing]	
Jacob Romeis (Toledo)	Republican	March 4, 1885 – March 3, 1889	49th 50th	Elected in 1884. Re-elected in 1886. [data missing]	
William E. Haynes (Fremont)	Democratic	March 4, 1889 – March 3, 1891	51st	Elected in 1888. Redistricted to the 7th district.	
Robert E. Doan (Wilmington)	Republican	March 4, 1891 – March 3, 1893	52nd	Elected in 1890. [data missing]	
William H. Enochs (Ironton)	Republican	March 4, 1893 – July 13, 1893	53rd	Redistricted from the 12th district and re-elected in 1892. Died.	
Vacant		July 13, 1893 – December 4, 1893	53rd		
Hezekiah S. Bundy (Wellston)	Republican	December 4, 1893 – March 3, 1895	53rd	Elected to finish Enochs's term. [data missing]	
Lucien J. Fenton (Winchester)	Republican	March 4, 1895 – March 3, 1899	54th 55th	Elected in 1894. Re-elected in 1896. [data missing]	
Stephen Morgan (Oak Hill)	Republican	March 4, 1899 – March 3, 1905	56th 57th 58th	Elected in 1898. Re-elected in 1900. Re-elected in 1902. [data missing]	
Henry T. Bannon (Portsmouth)	Republican	March 4, 1905 – March 3, 1909	59th 60th	Elected in 1904. Re-elected in 1906. [data missing]	
Adna R. Johnson (Ironton)	Republican	March 4, 1909 – March 3, 1911	61st	Elected in 1908. [data missing]	
Robert M. Switzer (Gallipolis)	Republican	March 4, 1911 – March 3, 1919	62nd 63rd 64th 65th	Elected in 1910; Re-elected in 1912. Re-elected in 1914. Re-elected in 1916. Lost renomination.	
Israel Foster (Athens)	Republican	March 4, 1919 – March 3, 1925	66th 67th 68th	Elected in 1918. Re-elected in 1920. Re-elected in 1922. Lost renomination.	
Thomas A. Jenkins (Ironton)	Republican	March 4, 1925 – January 3, 1959	69th 70th 71st 72nd 73rd 74th 75th 76th 77th 78th 79th 80th 81st 82nd 83rd 84th 85th	Elected in 1924. Re-elected in 1926. Re-elected in 1928. Re-elected in 1930. Re-elected in 1932. Re-elected in 1934. Re-elected in 1936. Re-elected in 1938. Re-elected in 1940. Re-elected in 1942. Re-elected in 1944. Re-elected in 1946. Re-elected in 1948. Re-elected in 1950. Re-elected in 1952. Re-elected in 1954. Re-elected in 1956. Retired.	
Walter H. Moeller (Lancaster)	Democratic	January 3, 1959 – January 3, 1963	86th 87th	Elected in 1958. Re-elected in 1960. Lost re-election.	
Pete Abele (McArthur)	Republican	January 3, 1963 – January 3, 1965	88th	Elected in 1962. Lost re-election.	
Walter H. Moeller (Lancaster)	Democratic	January 3, 1965 – January 3, 1967	89th	Elected in 1964. Lost re-election.	
Clarence E. Miller (Lancaster)	Republican	January 3, 1967 – January 3, 1993	90th 91st 92nd 93rd 94th 95th 96th 97th 98th 99th 100th 101st 102nd	Elected in 1966. Re-elected in 1968. Re-elected in 1970. Re-elected in 1972. Re-elected in 1974. Re-elected in 1976. Re-elected in 1978. Re-elected in 1980. Re-elected in 1982. Re-elected in 1984. Re-elected in 1986. Re-elected in 1988. Re-elected in 1990. Redistricted to the 7th district but ran in the 6th district and lost renomination there.	
Martin Hoke (Lakewood)	Republican	January 3, 1993 – January 3, 1997	103rd 104th	Elected in 1992. Re-elected in 1994. Lost re-election.	
Dennis Kucinich (Cleveland)	Democratic	January 3, 1997 – January 3, 2013	105th 106th 107th 108th 109th 110th 111th 112th	Elected in 1996. Re-elected in 1998. Re-elected in 2000. Re-elected in 2002. Re-elected in 2004. Re-elected in 2006. Re-elected in 2008. Re-elected in 2010. Redistricted to the 9th district and lost renomination there.	
Dennis Kucinich (Cleveland)	Democratic	January 3, 1997 – January 3, 2013	105th 106th 107th 108th 109th 110th 111th 112th	Elected in 1996. Re-elected in 1998. Re-elected in 2000. Re-elected in 2002. Re-elected in 2004. Re-elected in 2006. Re-elected in 2008. Re-elected in 2010. Redistricted to the 9th district and lost renomination there.	2003–2013
Mike Turner (Dayton)	Republican	January 3, 2013 – January 3, 2027	113th 114th 115th 116th 117th 118th 119th	Redistricted from the 3rd district and re-elected in 2012. Re-elected in 2014. Re-elected in 2016. Re-elected in 2018. Re-elected in 2020. Re-elected in 2022. Re-elected in 2024. Lost re-election.	
Mike Turner (Dayton)	Republican	January 3, 2013 – January 3, 2027	113th 114th 115th 116th 117th 118th 119th	Redistricted from the 3rd district and re-elected in 2012. Re-elected in 2014. Re-elected in 2016. Re-elected in 2018. Re-elected in 2020. Re-elected in 2022. Re-elected in 2024. Lost re-election.	2013–2023
Mike Turner (Dayton)	Republican	January 3, 2013 – January 3, 2027	113th 114th 115th 116th 117th 118th 119th	Redistricted from the 3rd district and re-elected in 2012. Re-elected in 2014. Re-elected in 2016. Re-elected in 2018. Re-elected in 2020. Re-elected in 2022. Re-elected in 2024. Lost re-election.	2023–2027
Kristina Knickerbocker (Yellow Springs)	Democratic	Assuming office on January 3, 2027		Elected in 2026.	2023–2027

== Recent election results ==
The following chart shows historic election results. Bold type indicates victor. Italic type indicates incumbent.

Year	Democratic	Republican	Other
1920	Benjamin F. Reynolds: 21,429	**Israel M. Foster**: 38,436	
1922	James Sharp: 17,811	**Israel M. Foster**: 30,341	
1924	W. F. Rutherford: 17,923	Thomas A. Jenkins: 32,617	
1926	Guy Stevenson: 14,460	**Thomas A. Jenkins**: 25,571	
1928	Charles E. Poston: 16,551	**Thomas A. Jenkins**: 38,347	
1930	H. L. Crary: 19,157	**Thomas A. Jenkins**: 31,836	
1932	Charles M. Hogan: 29,027	**Thomas A. Jenkins**: 41,654	
1934	W. F. Marting: 26,278	**Thomas A. Jenkins**: 36,824	
1936	O. J. Kleffner: 34,477	**Thomas A. Jenkins**: 46,965	
1938	Elsie Stanton: 24,198	**Thomas A. Jenkins**: 47,036	
1940	John P. Kelso: 33,698	**Thomas A. Jenkins**: 48,217	
1942	Oral Daugherty: 16,582	**Thomas A. Jenkins**: 29,691	
1944	Elsie Stanton: 23,986	**Thomas A. Jenkins**: 43,388	
1946	H. A. McCown: 17,719	**Thomas A. Jenkins**: 35,406	
1948	Delmar A. Canaday: 27,913	**Thomas A. Jenkins**: 38,330	
1950	William J. Curry: 21,117	**Thomas A. Jenkins**: 39,584	
1952	Delmar A. Canaday: 35,666	**Thomas A. Jenkins**: 63,339	
1954	Truman A. Morris: 28,150	**Thomas A. Jenkins**: 45,277	
1956		**Thomas A. Jenkins**: 71,295	
1958	Walter H. Moeller: 47,939	Homer E. "Pete" Abele: 42,607	
1960	**Walter H. Moeller**: 58,085	Oakley C. Collins: 52,479	
1962	Walter H. Moeller: 42,131	Homer E. "Pete" Abele: 46,158	
1964	Walter H. Moeller: 54,729	Homer E. "Pete" Abele: 49,744	
1966	Walter H. Moeller: 52,258	Clarence E. Miller: 56,659	
1968	Harry B. Crewson: 45,686	**Clarence E. Miller**: 102,890	
1970	Doug Arnett: 40,669	**Clarence E. Miller**: 80,838	
1972	Robert H. Whealey: 47,456	**Clarence E. Miller**: 129,683	
1974	H. Kent Bumpass: 42,333	**Clarence E. Miller**: 100,521	
1976	James A. Plummer: 57,757	**Clarence E. Miller**: 127,147	
1978	James A. Plummer: 35,039	**Clarence E. Miller**: 99,329	
1980	Jack E. Stecher: 49,433	**Clarence E. Miller**: 143,403	
1982	John M. Buchanan: 57,983	**Clarence E. Miller**: 100,044	
1984	John M. Buchanan: 55,172	**Clarence E. Miller**: 149,337	
1986	John M. Buchanan: 44,847	**Clarence E. Miller**: 106,870	
1988	John M. Buchanan: 56,893	**Clarence E. Miller**: 143,673	
1990	John M. Buchanan: 61,656	**Clarence E. Miller***: 106,009	
1992	Mary Rose Oakar*: 103,788	Martin R. Hoke: 136,433	
1994	Francis E. Gaul: 70,918	**Martin R. Hoke**: 95,226	Joseph J. Jacobs Jr. (I): 17,495
1996	Dennis J. Kucinich: 110,723	Martin R. Hoke: 104,546	Robert B. Iverson (N): 10,415
1998	**Dennis J. Kucinich**: 110,552	Joe Slovenec: 55,015	
2000	**Dennis J. Kucinich**: 167,063	Bill Smith: 48,930	Ron Petrie (L): 6,762
2002	**Dennis J. Kucinich**: 129,997	Jon A. Heben: 41,778	Judy Locy (I): 3,761
2004	**Dennis J. Kucinich**: 167,221	Edward F. Herman: 94,120	Barbara Ferris (IOC): 17,753
2006	**Dennis J. Kucinich**: 126,633	Michael D. Dovilla: 64,318	
2008	**Dennis J. Kucinich**: 157,268	James P. Trakas: 107,918	Paul Conroy (L): 10,623
2010	**Dennis J. Kucinich**: 101,343	Peter Corrigan: 83,809	Jeff Goggins (L): 5,874
2012	Sharen Neuhardt: 131,097	**Michael R. Turner**: 208,201	David Harlow (L): 10,373
2014	Robert Klepinger: 63,249	**Michael R. Turner**: 130,752	David Harlow (L): 6,650
2016	Robert Klepinger: 109,981	**Michael R. Turner**: 215,724	Tom McMaster (I): 10,890 David Harlow (WI): 7
2018	Theresa Gasper: 118,785	**Michael R. Turner**: 157,554	David Harlow (L): 5,387
2020	Desiree Tims: 151,976	**Michael R. Turner**: 212,972	
2022	David Esrati: 104,634	**Michael R. Turner**: 168,327	
2024	Amy Cox: 145,420	**Michael R. Turner**: 213,695	Michael Harbaugh: 11,631 (I)
2026	Kristina Knickerbocker: 149,024	Michael R. Turner: 144,086	Thomas F. McMasters (L): 8,906

== See also ==
- Ohio's 10th congressional district Democratic primary election 2008
- Ohio's congressional districts
- List of United States congressional districts
