= Henry T. Bannon =

American politician (1867–1950)

Henry Towne Bannon
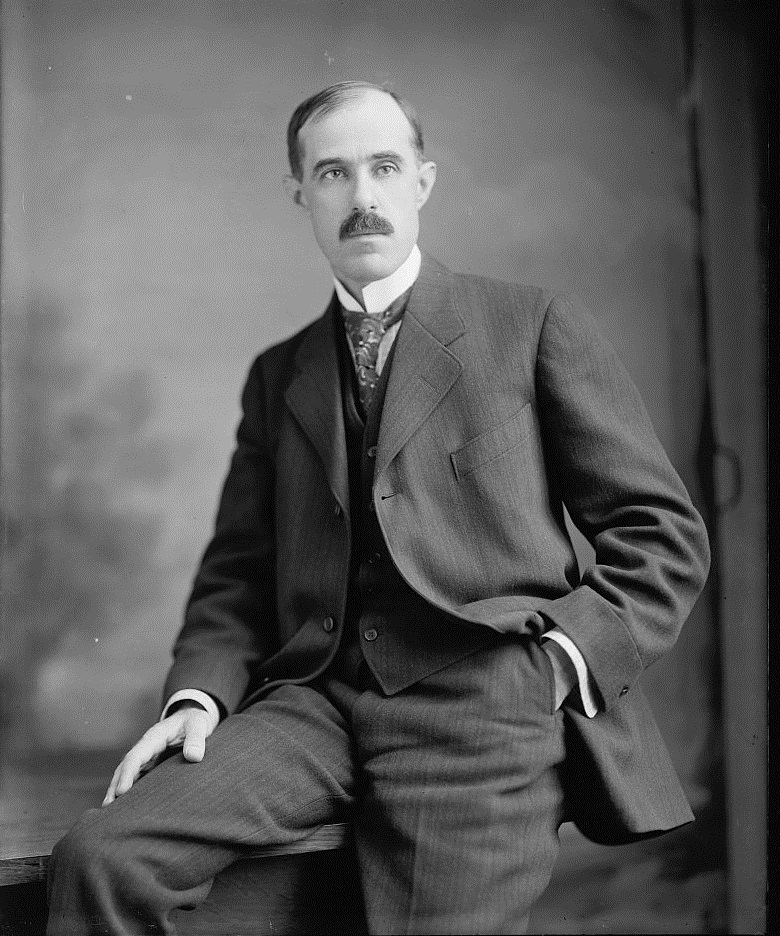

Member of the U.S. House of Representatives from Ohio's 10th district
- In office March 4, 1905 – March 3, 1909
- Preceded by: Stephen Morgan
- Succeeded by: Adna R. Johnson

Personal details
- Born: June 5, 1867 Portsmouth, Ohio
- Died: September 6, 1950 (aged 83) Portsmouth, Ohio
- Resting place: Greenlawn Cemetery, Portsmouth
- Party: Republican
- Spouse: Jessie Damaria
- Children: 2
- Education: Ohio State University; University of Michigan

Henry Towne Bannon (June 5, 1867 – September 6, 1950) was a U.S. representative from Ohio for two terms from 1905 to 1909.

== Life and career ==
Bannon was the grandson of Irish immigrants, Edward and Bridget Dervin Bannon. His father, James. W. Bannon (1841-1916), was a Scioto County Common Pleas Court judge (1884-1887), attorney and businessman in Portsmouth. Henry Bannon was born in Portsmouth, Ohio, Bannon attended the public schools of Portsmouth, Ohio State University in Columbus in 1885 and 1886, and graduated from the University of Michigan at Ann Arbor in 1889. Bannon had two brothers, Arthur H. Bannon and James W. Bannon, Jr., and a sister Charlotte Bannon. He studied law. He was admitted to the Ohio bar in 1891 and practiced in Portsmouth, Ohio, along with his brother Arthur and his father, both of whom were attorneys, as well. He served as prosecuting attorney of Scioto County 1897-1902.

=== Congress and later career ===
Bannon was elected as a Republican to the Fifty-ninth and Sixtieth Congresses (March 4, 1905 – March 3, 1909). He was not a candidate for renomination in 1908.

He resumed the practice of law and served as delegate to the Republican National Conventions in 1924, 1928, 1932, 1936, and 1940. He served as a director of the First National Bank, National Bank of Portsmouth, Oak Hill Savings Bank, and the Selby Shoe Co.. He also engaged in literary pursuits.

== Death ==
He died in Portsmouth, Ohio, September 6, 1950. He was interred in Greenlawn Cemetery.

== Local History ==
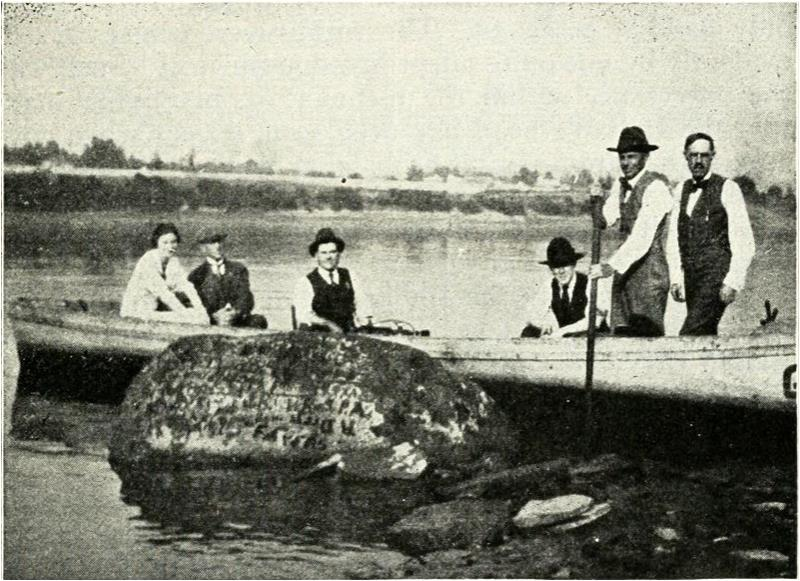
Bannon (far right) is seen visiting Indian Head Rock in 1920. The City of Portsmouth, Ohio, can be seen in the background.

Bannon wrote two popular books on local Portsmouth and Scioto County history. Scioto Sketches: An Account of Discovery and Settlement of Scioto County, Ohio was published in 1920 and described Indian settlements and early interactions with European settlers, historic flora and fauna, and Indian mounds and relics. Bannon's second book, Stories Old and Often Told: Being Chronicles of Scioto County, Ohio, was published in 1927 and it expanded on his previous work to include the War of 1812, early transportation in the area, and early industry, among other topics.

=== Indian Head Rock ===
Bannon's interest in Indians and local history is reflected in his efforts to document and publicize the Indian Head Rock, a local artifact, which he examined in 1894 and 1920. He wrote an account of the Indian Head Rock for the Ohio State Archaeology and Historic Society which was published in the society's journal in 1921.

== Publications ==
- Bannon, Henry Towne (1920). Scioto sketches; an account of discovery and settlement of Scioto County, Ohio. Chicago: A. C. McClurg & Company. - local history
- Bannon, Henry Towne (1927). Stories old and often told, being chronicles of Scioto County, Ohio. Baltimore: Waverly Press, Inc. - local history

== Sources ==
- United States Congress. "Henry T. Bannon (id: B000118)". Biographical Directory of the United States Congress.

U.S. House of Representatives
Preceded by Stephen Morgan	Member of the U.S. House of Representatives from Ohio's 10th congressional district March 4, 1905–March 3, 1909	Succeeded by Adna R. Johnson
