= Frank Gaul =

American politician (1924–2013)

No. 20
- Position: Tackle

Personal information
- Born: August 8, 1926; Cleveland, Ohio, U.S.
- Died: September 15, 2013 (aged 87); Lakewood, Ohio, U.S.
- Listed height: 6 ft 0 in (1.83 m)
- Listed weight: 200 lb (91 kg)

Career information
- High school: Cathedral Latin (Cleveland)
- College: Notre Dame (1945–1948)
- NFL draft: 1950: 19th round, 242nd overall pick

Career history
- New York Bulldogs (1949)

Career NFL statistics
- Games played: 12
- Stats at Pro Football Reference

Francis E. Gaul (August 8, 1924 – September 15, 2013) was an American politician and football player. He was a member of the Democratic party. He was the Treasurer of Cuyahoga County, Ohio from 1976 to 1995.

Gaul started his career as a city councilman in Cleveland, Ohio, representing a predominantly Irish-Catholic ward on the west side.

== Football career ==
Gaul played college football for the Notre Dame Fighting Irish. He played in the NFL for the New York Bulldogs in 1949.

== Treasurer of Cuyahoga County ==
Gaul served as Treasurer of Cuyahoga County from 1975 to 1996.

In 1994, The Plain Dealer reported that Gaul had made risky investments using county funds through the Secured Assets Fund Earnings (SAFE) investment pool. When the investment pool collapsed, the county lost $115 million. In 1997, Gaul was acquitted by the Ohio Court of Appeals of any criminal wrongdoing in association with SAFE. The court overturned Gaul's conviction by an inferior court for "dereliction of duty", for which he had been sentenced to 90 days in jail.

In 1989, Gaul was criticized for appearing in radio advertisements in which he endorsed certificates of deposits at Transohio Saving Bank. Gaul said he had been paid for the advertisements but donated the payment to charity.

== Other political offices and candidacies ==
Gaul also served on Cleveland City Council and on the board of the Cleveland-Cuyahoga County Port Authority.

In 1994, Gaul was the Democratic nominee who unsuccessfully challenged incumbent Republican U.S. Rep. Martin R. Hoke. In 1982, he was a candidate in the Democratic Primary for Ohio Secretary of State, won by Sherrod Brown.

== See also ==
- Ohio's 10th congressional district
