= Northland Mall (disambiguation) =

Northland Mall was a shopping mall in Columbus, Ohio.

Northland Mall may also refer to:

- Northland Mall (Appleton, Wisconsin), a mall in Appleton, Wisconsin
- Northland Mall, a defunct mall in Worthington, Minnesota; see Kohan Retail Investment Group

== See also ==
- Northland Center, a defunct mall in Southfield, Michigan
- Northland Village Mall, a defunct mall in Calgary, Alberta
- Buzz Westfall Plaza on the Boulevard, formerly Northland Shopping Center, in Jennings, Missouri
- Northland (disambiguation)
- Northlands (disambiguation)
