= Calgary Crowfoot =

Federal electoral district in Alberta, Canada

Alberta electoral district
- Interactive map of riding boundaries from the 2025 federal election

Federal electoral district
- Legislature: House of Commons
MP
Pat Kelly
Conservative
- District created: 2013
- First contested: 2015
- Last contested: 2025
- District webpage: profile, map

Demographics
- Population (2011): 108,901
- Electors (2019): 98,092
- Area (km²): 90
- Pop. density (per km²): 1,210
- Census division: Division No. 6
- Census subdivision: Calgary (part)

Calgary Crowfoot is a federal electoral district in Alberta, Canada, that has been represented in the House of Commons of Canada since 2025. It was known as Calgary Rocky Ridge from 2015 to 2025.

Calgary Rocky Ridge was created by the 2012 federal electoral boundaries redistribution and was legally defined in the 2013 representation order. It came into effect upon the call of the 42nd Canadian federal election, scheduled for October 2015. It was created out of parts of the electoral districts of Calgary—Nose Hill and Calgary West.

Following the 2022 Canadian federal electoral redistribution, this riding was renamed upon the call of the 2025 Canadian federal election. It lost the neighbourhood of Kincora to Calgary Nose Hill, and the neighbourhoods of Evanston and Sage Hill east of Symons Valley Rd to Calgary Skyview.

== Demographics ==
Panethnic groups in Calgary Rocky Ridge (2011−2021)
Panethnic group	2021		2016		2011	
Panethnic group	Pop.	%	Pop.	%	Pop.	%
European (Note: Statistic includes all persons that did not make up part of a visible minority or an indigenous identity.)	75,910	52.92%	77,590	59.49%	74,795	69.28%
East Asian (Note: Statistic includes total responses of "Chinese", "Korean", and "Japanese" under visible minority section on census.)	19,125	13.33%	17,030	13.06%	12,435	11.52%
South Asian	16,345	11.4%	12,530	9.61%	6,875	6.37%
African	9,290	6.48%	5,630	4.32%	2,600	2.41%
Southeast Asian (Note: Statistic includes total responses of "Filipino" and "Southeast Asian" under visible minority section on census.)	8,110	5.65%	6,105	4.68%	3,660	3.39%
Middle Eastern (Note: Statistic includes total responses of "West Asian" and "Arab" under visible minority section on census.)	4,955	3.45%	3,785	2.9%	2,570	2.38%
Latin American	3,395	2.37%	2,965	2.27%	1,940	1.8%
Indigenous	3,100	2.16%	2,470	1.89%	1,795	1.66%
Other/Multiracial (Note: Statistic includes total responses of "Visible minority, n.i.e." and "Multiple visible minorities" under visible minority section on census.)	3,200	2.23%	2,315	1.78%	1,285	1.19%
Total responses	143,440	98.7%	130,415	98.93%	107,955	99.13%
Total population	145,326	100%	131,823	100%	108,901	100%
Notes: Totals greater than 100% due to multiple origin responses. Demographics based on 2012 Canadian federal electoral redistribution riding boundaries.

== Members of Parliament ==
This riding has elected the following members of the House of Commons of Canada:

Parliament	Years	Member	Party
Calgary Rocky Ridge; Riding created from Calgary—Nose Hill and Calgary West
42nd	2015–2019	Pat Kelly	Conservative
43rd	2019–2021	Pat Kelly	Conservative
44th	2021–2025	Pat Kelly	Conservative
Calgary Crowfoot
45th	2025–present	Pat Kelly	Conservative

== Election results ==
View source data.
Graph of election results in Calgary Rocky Ridge (minor parties that never got 2% of the vote or didn't run consistently are omitted)

=== Calgary Crowfoot, 2023 representation order ===
2025 Canadian federal election
Party	Candidate	Votes	%	±%	Expenditures
Conservative	Pat Kelly	39,971	58.84	+3.90	$47,889.47
Liberal	Shahnaz Munir	25,386	37.37	+15.68	$49,179.62
New Democratic	Jim Samuelson	1,741	2.56	–13.62	$861.35
People's	Yvonne Snyder	360	0.53	–4.10	none listed
Green	Nanette Nerland	346	0.51	–1.17	none listed
Independent	Lachlan Van Egmond	131	0.19	–	none listed
Total valid votes/expense limit		67,935	99.48	–	$136,709.21
Total rejected ballots		358	0.52	–0.07	
Turnout		68,293	73.94	+7.70	
Eligible voters		92,358			
Conservative hold		Swing		–5.89	
Source: Elections Canada

2021 federal election redistributed results
Party	Vote	%
Conservative	30,836	54.94
Liberal	12,174	21.69
New Democratic	9,081	16.18
People's	2,601	4.63
Green	941	1.68
Others	491	0.87

=== Calgary Rocky Ridge, 2013 representation order ===
2021 Canadian federal election: Calgary Rocky Ridge
Party	Candidate	Votes	%	±%	Expenditures
Conservative	Pat Kelly	36,034	54.53	–13.77	$41,392.98
Liberal	Shahnaz Munir	14,693	22.23	+3.81	$22,746.05
New Democratic	Jena Dianne Kieren	10,748	16.26	+7.70	$1,017.75
People's	Rory MacLeod	3,003	4.54	+3.05	$3,852.88
Green	Catriona Wright	1,052	1.59	–1.26	$47.98
Maverick	David Robinson	554	0.84	–	$2,422.15
Total valid votes/expense limit		66,084	99.41	–	$126,753.04
Total rejected ballots		390	0.59	+0.19	
Turnout		66,474	66.24	–5.60	
Eligible voters		100,354			
Conservative hold		Swing		–8.79	
Source: Elections Canada

2019 Canadian federal election: Calgary Rocky Ridge
Party	Candidate	Votes	%	±%	Expenditures
Conservative	Pat Kelly	48,253	68.30	+7.90	$53,990.39
Liberal	Todd Kathol	13,012	18.42	–13.24	$33,215.37
New Democratic	Nathan LeBlanc Fortin	6,051	8.56	+2.77	none listed
Green	Catriona Wright	2,011	2.85	+0.70	$4,625.33
People's	Tyler Poulin	1,053	1.49	–	none listed
Independent	Shaoli Wang	270	0.38	–	none listed
Total valid votes/expense limit		70,650	99.60	–	$121,590.97
Total rejected ballots		284	0.40	+0.14	
Turnout		70,934	71.84	–0.27	
Eligible voters		98,738			
Conservative hold		Swing		+10.57	
Source: Elections Canada

2015 Canadian federal election: Calgary Rocky Ridge
Party	Candidate	Votes	%	±%	Expenditures
Conservative	Pat Kelly	38,229	60.40	–8.12	$91,014.33
Liberal	Nirmala Naidoo	20,038	31.66	+19.01	$42,532.38
New Democratic	Stephanie Kot	3,665	5.79	–5.68	$6,715.72
Green	Catriona Wright	1,360	2.15	–5.10	$4,178.50
Total valid votes/expense limit		63,292	99.74	–	$226,211.83
Total rejected ballots		167	0.26	–	
Turnout		63,459	72.11	–	
Eligible voters		88,007			
Conservative hold		Swing		–13.56	
Source: Elections Canada

2011 federal election redistributed results
Party	Vote	%
Conservative	30,179	68.52
Liberal	5,572	12.65
New Democratic	5,051	11.47
Green	3,191	7.24
Marxist–Leninist	52	0.12

== See also ==
- List of Canadian electoral districts
- Historical federal electoral districts of Canada
