= Sir Winston Churchill High School (Calgary, Alberta) =

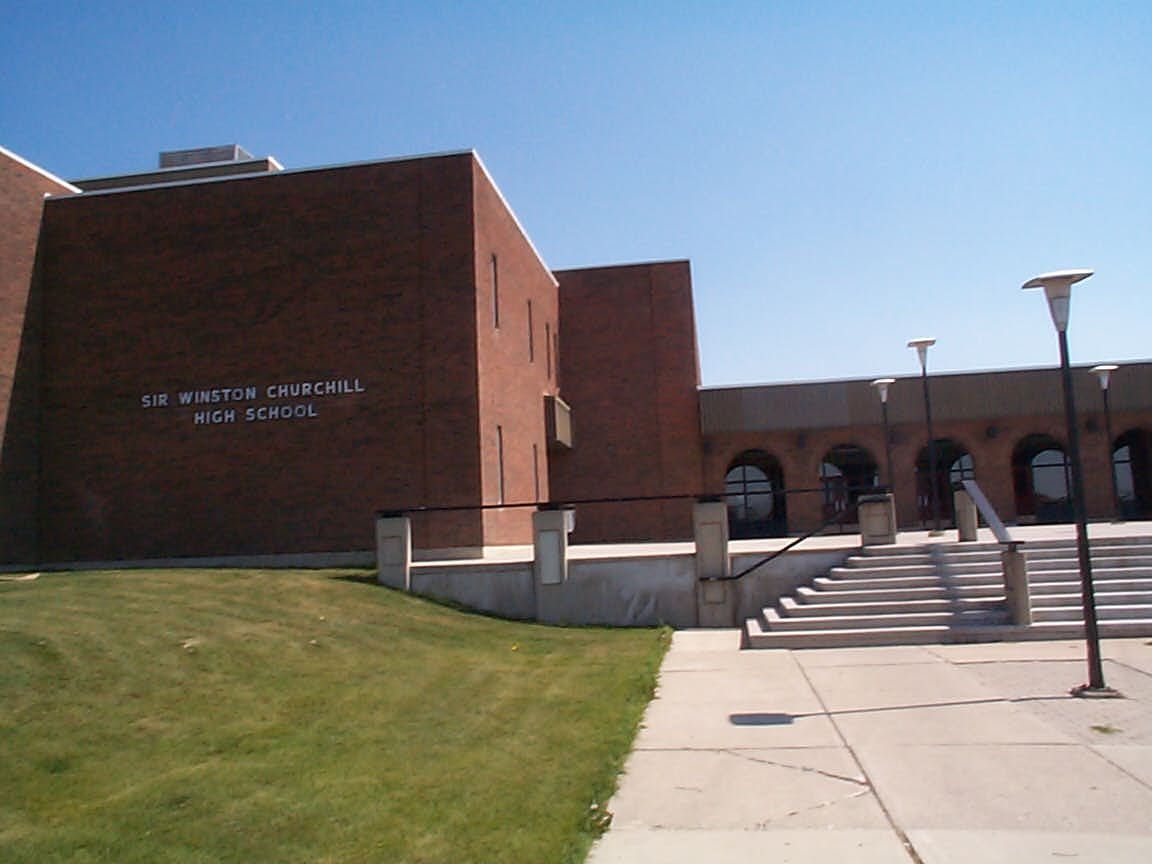

Location
- 5220 Northland Drive; Calgary, Alberta, T2L 2J6; Canada; 51.1000°N 114.1400°W

Information
- Type: Public
- Motto: Latin: Non Scholae Sed Vitae (We learn, not for school, but for life)
- Founded: 1968
- School board: Calgary Board of Education
- Principal: Arvin Rajan
- Grades: 10–12
- Enrollment: 2166 (2025-2026)
  - Grade 10: 741
  - Grade 11: 678
  - Grade 12: 747
- Campus type: Suburban
- Colours: Red, white, and blue
- Mascot: Brutus the Bulldog
- Team name: Bulldogs
- Newspaper: The Churchill Chronicle
- Communities served: Brentwood (sections), Dalhousie (sections), Edgemont, The Hamptons, Sherwood Varsity Acres and Varsity Estates (as of December 2022)
- Feeder schools: H.D. Cartwright Junior High; F.E. Osborne Junior High; Simon Fraser Junior High; Tom Baines Junior High; Thomas B. Riley Junior High
- Website: sirwinstonchurchill.cbe.ab.ca

Sir Winston Churchill High School is a senior high school in Calgary, Alberta, Canada. It derives its name from Sir Winston Churchill, two-term prime minister of the United Kingdom. The high school is built in the Northwest community of Brentwood. The school offers the International Baccalaureate (IB) programme, various second languages, and numerous clubs and teams.

== International Baccalaureate programme ==
Sir Winston Churchill High School became the first public school in Canada to offer the IB program in 1978. It was promoted by the principal, Jim McLellan, in the interest of the school's brightest and most motivated students.

The IB Diploma/Certificate programme begins in the middle of a student's grade 10 year with Math and/or Physics/Biology/Business Management. Other IB courses begin during the grade 11 year and include Art, Chemistry, Computer Science, World History, English, French and Mandarin. During their grade 11 year, IB students taking, at least, one of the IB Group 4 subjects are required to complete a science fair style project, demonstrating their knowledge of the scientific concepts behind a topic of their choosing. During their grade 12 year, IB Diploma students will work on an involved, self-instructed and teacher-guided essay on a topic of their choice, known as the Extended Essay. Students taking History, regardless of Diploma or Certificate involvement also complete an Internal Assessment, similar to the Extended Essay.

== Athletics ==
The school's athletic teams competes and participates in the Calgary Zone of the Alberta Schools Athletic Association.

Various sports are played within school, and school teams of SWC are strong competitors among the Calgary Senior High schools. They have been crowned Overall Champions in Wrestling, Badminton, Basketball, Rugby, Swimming, Diving, Soccer, Field Hockey, Table Tennis, and Volleyball. The School's Swimming, Basketball and Wrestling are the most distinguished among all.

Coed	Male	Female
Badminton team; Badminton club; Cross country; Swimming and diving; Track and field	Basketball, junior; Basketball, senior; Football, junior; Football, senior; Soccer; Volleyball, junior; Volleyball, senior; Wrestling; Rugby union, Junior; Rugby, Senior	Basketball, junior; Basketball, senior; Field Hockey, junior; Field Hockey, senior; Soccer; Volleyball, junior; Volleyball, senior; Wrestling; Rugby, Junior; Rugby, Senior

== The fine arts and performing arts ==
=== Sir Winston Churchill High School music program ===
The band program of Sir Winston Churchill includes the Concert Band, the Symphonic Band, the Blue Jazz Band, the Jazz Army Band, the Jazz Combo, the Choir, and the Percussion Ensemble.

Each year, Sir Winston Churchill bands attend several competitions, including the Alberta inter-city competition, Alberta International Band Festival, and several other inter-province band festivals. All bands also go on an annual band trip, to spend a few days in another city, where they perform and record the annual Sir Winston Churchill CD (recorded by DarkMatter Productions).

== Extracurricular activities and clubs ==
=== Model United Nations ===
In 2014, the MUN team took home city championships as well as several national awards. In 2015, the MUN team claimed city championships once more, and in 2016, did the same. Also in 2016, the MUN team won first place at SSUNS in Montreal, first place at WAMUN, and first place at WCHSMUN. In the 2017–2018 school year, the MUN team won first place at SSUNS for the third year in the row, won the Westmount Charter Model United Nations Conference for the second year in a row, and came back from the NHSMUN conference with an award of merit. They also won the city championship for the fifth year in a row in February. One of its students also took home a best delegate award at the Harvard Model United Nations conference in January 2018. During the 2018–19 school year the team once again won Best Small Delegation at SSUNS for the fourth year in a row and also won the same award at its first performance at the Canadian High Schools Model UN Conference in Vancouver. The team also won various Best Delegations in Calgary conferences, won numerous awards at its first performance at the MUNUC conference in Chicago, and came second at the city championships. Churchill has its own conference, SWCHSMUN, which is run by students. Registration is open to almost any high school student. In its most recent conference, Churchill hosted schools from across the province, and even brought in a school from Houston, Texas.

=== Clubs ===
Competitive
- Stock Market Competition
- Debate/Speech Club
- Intramural Activities
- Science Olympics and SET Challenge
- Science Fair and Contests
- Swim and Dive Team
- Model United Nations
- Symphonic Band
- Concert Band
- Jazz Army
- Robotics (VEX robotics team)
Service
- Operation Education Charity Club
- Recycling Earth Club
- Student Leadership Activities
- Yearbook Club
- Volunteer Churchill (VC)
- Right To Learn
- Cancer Society
- Citizens of Churchill
- Grad Video
- Grad Committee
Academic
- Astrophysics Club
- Book Club
- Biology Club
- Chemistry Club
- Computer Programming Club
- French Club
- German Club
- Math Club
- Political Science Club
- Science Café
- Spanish Club
Other
- Film Club
- Badminton Club
- Muslim Club
- Christian Life Club
- Sikh Club
- Chess Club
- Choral Activities
- Fitness Club
- Anime Club
- Gardening Club
- Amnesty International Club
- ACS Chemistry Club

== Notable alumni ==
- Bob Bassen - former NHL forward
- Roman Danylo (1987) - comedian on CTV's Comedy Inc. and previously The Holmes Show
- Sam Effah - Represented Canada at the 2010 Commonwealth Games in track and field
- John Fawcett (1986) - Director of film and television shows such as Ginger Snaps and Orphan Black
- Brandon Firla - actor and comedian in Billable Hours and Little Mosque on the Prairie
- Terri Hawkes — actress, screenwriter and playwright. Best known for voicing Sailor Moon (in English), playing Wendy Masters on General Hospital and writing the screenplay for The Book Of Eve
- Matt Lambros - professional Canadian Football League wide receiver for the Toronto Argonauts
- Raghav - Canadian pop singer and recording artist
- Cale Makar, NHL defenseman, 2022 Conn Smythe Trophy winner, 2022 Norris Trophy winner, and 2022 Stanley Cup champion
- Peter Oldring (1987) - actor who had a role in films K-19: The Widowmaker and Lost and Delirious, as well as various comedic television programs
- Riza Santos - Miss Canada 2013, and second-place winner on the Filipino reality TV show, Pinoy Big Brother
- Ashwin Sood (1985) - recording artist, drummer and former husband of Sarah McLachlan
- Fiona Staples - comic book artist
- Karl Tilleman - basketball player on Canada's Olympic team. (Tilleman holds the Olympic record for the most three-point baskets in a single basketball game)
- Curtis Waters - musician and songwriter, best known for his 2020 debut single “Stunnin”
