= Shaganappi Trail =

Major super-4 expressway in the northwest quadrant of Calgary, Alberta

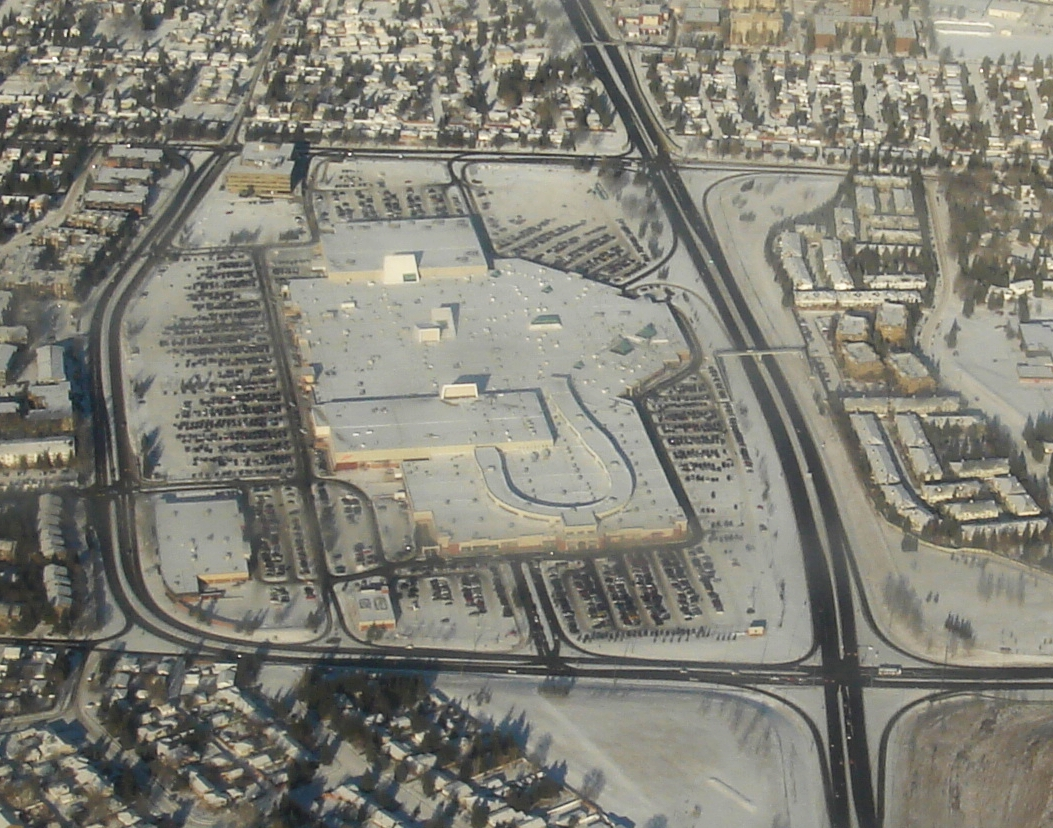
- View of Shaganappi Trail's intersections with 32 Avenue NW and 40 Avenue NW, with Market Mall visible.
- Maintained by: City of Calgary
- Length: 16.9 km (10.5 mi)
- Location: Calgary, Alberta
- South end: 16 Avenue NW (Highway 1) / Bowness Road
- Major junctions: Crowchild Trail (Highway 1A); John Laurie Boulevard; Country Hills Boulevard; Stoney Trail (Highway 201)
- North end: Highway 772

Neighbourhoods
- Parkdale; Montgomery; University Heights; Varsity; Dalhousie; Brentwood; Dalhousie; Edgemont; MacEwan Glen; Hamptons; Hidden Valley; Sherwood; Kincora; Nolan Hill; Sage Hill

Shaganappi Trail (/ˌʃæɡəˈnæpi/) is a major super-4 expressway in the northwest quadrant of Calgary, Alberta. It extends to the south as Montgomery View, a small service road in the neighbourhood of Montgomery and that provides access to Edworthy Park, passes north past Market Mall and the western boundary of Nose Hill Park, and terminates in the neighbourhood of Nolan Hill in the north, with city planning maps indicating future northern extension beyond 144 Avenue NW. The name "Shaganappi" is of Cree origin, referring to the bison hide lacings that held Red River ox carts together. Despite the name, it is not located near the Shaganappi neighbourhood, which is located south of the Bow River.

== Route ==
Shaganappi Trail begins as a short 2 lane road providing access to Edworthy Park. After crossing Bowness Road at a signal light it immediately travels through an interchange with 16 Avenue (Highway 1/TCH) before widening to a 4 lane cross section with a 70 km/h (43 mph) speed limit. It then climbs up a hill below the Alberta Children's Hospital out of the river valley. At the top it passes through signal lights at University Avenue, 32nd Avenue, 40th Avenue and Varsity Drive passing next to Market Mall and through the community of Varsity. It then passes over Crowchild Trail in a split diamond interchange before continuing past Northland Mall. The road widens to 5 lanes and passes through lights at Dalhousie Drive and John Laurie Boulevard and the speed limit rises to 80 km/h (50 mph). The road then cuts up a steep hill through Nose Hill Park. After passing an intersection for Edgemont Boulevard it then descends down another steep hill past traffic lights at Country Hills Boulevard. After that the expressway ends and the road shrinks to 2 lanes and the speed limit goes down to 60 km/h (37 mph). It crosses Stoney Trail (Highway 201) at a partial cloverleaf interchange before widening to a 4 lane arterial road and continues through residential neighbourhoods before connecting with Highway 772 at Calgary's northern city limit.

== History ==
Shaganappi Trail was originally planned in 1970 to be part of a network of freeways. The 1970 functional study planned it to extend south as a controlled access road from the future ring road (now Stoney Trail) past several Interchanges to a three-level interchange at Crowchild Trail. From there on it would continue through Varsity, past Interchanges connecting to Market Mall and then down the hill to connect to a massive six-way, free-flowing combination interchange with a proposed Highway 1 freeway and Memorial Drive (Now called Bowness Road). From there it would then cross the Bow River and connect with Bow Trail and Sarcee Trail at another major interchange. Edworthy Park on both sides of the rivers was meant to be a temporary park to protect the right-of-way, since there are no Bow River crossings between 16 Avenue NW to the west and Crowchild Trail to the east. The 6-lane freeway was planned to be built in three stages, with the first stage being built soon after the functional plan was released. The first stage involved constructing Shaganappi as a 4 lane limited-access road with signalized intersections. It was constructed from Bowness Road to what is now Country Hills Boulevard. At the same time, the small overpass carrying 16 Ave was grandfathered into an interchange with Shaganappi from an older road arrangement. The plan to extend Shaganappi across the river and upgrade it to a freeway was proposed again in the 1995 Calgary Transportation Plan, also known as the "Go Plan"; however public opposition to both it and a similar plan to extend Sarcee Trail through a natural area, led to it officially being eliminated from the plans in 2009. As a result, the road remains mostly in its stage one configuration in the present time.

In the 1990s the road was extended into Hidden Valley and a split diamond interchange was constructed at Crowchild Trail. The road was extended beyond the Stoney Trail right-of-way when the Sherwood community was developed around 2005. In 2009 when northwest Stoney Trail opened, a Partial cloverleaf interchange with a 3-lane overpass was constructed to service Shaganappi. However, grading was put in place to allow it to be easily upgraded to a combination interchange if the freeway plans were implemented. Shaganappi was extended north as an arterial road to 144 Avenue in 2013 as more neighbourhoods were built. 144 Avenue currently forms part of the north edge of the city, but when future communities get built farther north, Shaganappi will likely be extended further. In 2022 upgrades were completed to accommodate a 6-lane overpass over Stoney Trail as well as a signalized intersection with Hidden Valley Drive.

== Future ==
After the cancelation of the extension south of the Bow River and the 16 Avenue connecting freeway Shaganappi Trail was downgraded in classification to an arterial road south of Crowchild Trail. Recently made long-term plans have moved away from freeway conversion and instead plan a 6 lane arterial street with curb HOV lanes, additional signalized intersections and bike lanes. The confusing and accident-prone interchange complex at 16 Avenue, Bowness Road and Shaganappi Trail also is now planned to be replaced by a diamond Interchange favouring 16 Avenue resulting in 2 new signal lights along Shaganappi. Between Crowchild and Stoney Trail, Shaganappi remains classified as a skeletal road by the City of Calgary and freeway upgrades still remains a possibility in the long term. That section of the corridor is also planned to contain a future BRT route as well which may run on the shoulder of the Shaganappi trail or on its own parallel road. It was constructed as expressway to allow for upgrades to freeway up to Stoney Trail with grading in place to allow a combination interchange at the freeway.

== Major intersections ==
From south to north. The entire route is in Calgary.

km	mi	Destinations	Notes
0.0– 0.3	0.0– 0.19	Montgomery View Highway 1 (16 Avenue NW) / Bowness Road	Partially grade-separated; access to Foothills Medical Centre and Edworthy Park
1.4	0.87	West Campus Way	Access to Alberta Children's Hospital
3.1	1.9	32 Avenue NW	Access to Market Mall and University of Calgary
2.9	1.8	40 Avenue NW	Access to Market Mall
4.1– 4.2	2.5– 2.6	Highway 1A (Crowchild Trail)	Split diamond interchange
4.9	3.0	Northland Drive / Dalhousie Drive	Access to Northland Village Mall
5.6	3.5	John Laurie Boulevard	
7.7	4.8	Edgemont Boulevard	Access to Nose Hill Park
9.8	6.1	Country Hills Boulevard	
11.0– 12.0	6.8– 7.5	Highway 201 (Stoney Trail)	Partial cloverleaf interchange; Highway 201 exit 48
13.5	8.4	Symons Valley Parkway	
15.3	9.5	144 Avenue NW	
16.9	10.5	Highway 772 north / Symons Valley Road	Continues as Highway 772
1.000 mi = 1.609 km; 1.000 km = 0.621 mi: Route transition

== Pedestrian crossings ==
Because of the roadway's width, high traffic volume, and the need for pedestrians to cross it, three dedicated crossings have been built, one at Market Mall, one near Valiant Drive, and one at Northland Village Mall called the Shaganappi Trail Pedestrian Overpass (2015).

== See also ==
- Transportation in Calgary
