= Sage Hill =

Sage Hill may refer to:

- Sage Hill School, a private school in Newport Coast, California
- Sage Hill, Calgary, a community in Alberta, Canada
