= Edgemont, Calgary =

Edgemont
- Neighbourhood streets and roads
- Location of Edgemont in Calgary
- Coordinates: 51°07′31″N 114°09′02″W
- Country: Canada
- Province: Alberta
- City: Calgary
- Quarant: NW
- Ward: 4
- Established: 1978

Government
  - Mayor: Jeromy Farkas
  - Administrative body: Calgary City Council
  - Councillor: DJ Kelly (The Calgary Party)

Area
  - Total: 6 km^{2} (2.3 sq mi)
- Elevation: 1,195 m (3,921 ft)

Population (2015)
  - Total: 15,986
  - Average Income: $88,442
- Time zone: UTC-7 (MST)
- Area code: +1-403
- Website: Edgemont Community Association

Edgemont is a residential neighbourhood in northwest Calgary, Alberta, Canada, and is located north of the community of Dalhousie. It is also bounded by John Laurie Boulevard to the south, Sarcee Trail to the west, Country Hills Boulevard to the north, and Shaganappi Trail to the east.

Much of Edgemont is a northwest extension of Nose Hill, as evidenced by the steep escarpments at the southeast end of the community. The elevated position of Edgemont (1245m at its highest) provides views of the city to the south and the Rocky Mountains to the west.

The community began development in 1978, and was recently completed. It is represented in the Calgary City Council by the Ward 4 councillor.

== Demographics ==
In the City of Calgary's 2012 municipal census, Edgemont had a population of 15,898 living in 5,421 dwellings, a 1.1% decrease from its 2011 population of 16,082. With a land area of 6.6 km^{2} (2.5 sq mi), it had a population density of 2,409/km^{2} (6,240/sq mi) in 2012.

According to statistics from 2000, residents in this community had a median household income of $88,442, and there was 8.6% low income residents living in the neighbourhood. As of 2000, 33.9% of the residents were immigrants. A proportion of 5.8% of the buildings were condominiums or apartments, and 11.1% of the housing was used for renting.

Edgemont is divided in subareas: from oldest to newest, the subareas are Edgemont Estates, Edgedale, Edenwold, Edgepark, Edgevalley, Edgebrook, and Edgeridge.

== Education ==
As of 2010, there were three schools in the district: Edgemont Elementary School; Tom Baines Junior High School (public system); and Mother Mary Greene Elementary School in (Catholic). Students in Edgemont continue onto Sir Winston Churchill High School in the public system, or St. Francis High School in the Catholic system.

== See also ==
- List of neighbourhoods in Calgary
