= 2009 Toronto Argonauts season =

CFL team season

- General manager: Adam Rita
- Head coach: Bart Andrus
- Home stadium: Rogers Centre

Results
- Record: 3–15
- Division place: 4th, East
- Playoffs: did not qualify

Uniform

The 2009 Toronto Argonauts season was the 52nd season for the team in the Canadian Football League (CFL) and their 137th overall. The Argonauts attempted to win their 16th Grey Cup championship, but they failed to make the playoffs for the second straight year, finishing the season with a 3–15 record for the first time since 1993.

Training camp opened on June 7 and Toronto's first pre-season game was on June 17, 2009, at the Rogers Centre, hosting the Montreal Alouettes. The regular season kicked off on July 1 at the Hamilton Tiger-Cats' Ivor Wynne Stadium, where the Argos defeated the Ti-Cats 30–17.

== Off-season ==
On January 16, 2009, the Argonauts announced that Bart Andrus had been hired as the new head coach. He became the 40th head coach in the team's 136-year history and marked his first experience in Canadian football.

=== CFL draft ===
The 2009 CFL draft took place on May 2, 2009. The Argonauts had the second overall pick and selected Laval tackle Étienne Légaré, immediately signing him to a three-year contract.

Round	Pick	Player	Position	School/Club team
1	2	Étienne Légaré	DT	Laval
2	10	Matt Lambros	WR	Liberty
3	18	James Green	DB	Calgary
4	26	Zachary Pollari	OT	Western Ontario
5	34	Gordon Sawler	DL	St. Francis Xavier
6	42	Anthony DesLauriers	DB	Simon Fraser
6	43	Brad Crawford	DB	Guelph

=== Notable transactions ===
The Toronto Argonauts were active on the opening day of free agency on February 16 signing tackle Rob Murphy, the most sought after offensive lineman available in the free-agent pool, centre Dominic Picard, and re-signing linebacker Willie Pile, who posted a team-high 75 tackles in 2008.

Date	Type	Incoming	Outgoing	Team
Jan. 9	released	n/a	Kenny Wheaton	
Jan. 13	signed	Jordan Younger	n/a	
Jan. 27	deferred	n/a	P.K. Sam	Buffalo Bills
Feb. 3	deferred	n/a	Byron Parker	Philadelphia Eagles
Feb. 4	deferred	n/a	Dominique Dorsey	Washington Redskins
Feb. 10	released	n/a	Keith Stokes	
Feb. 16	free agency	n/a	Michael Fletcher	
Feb. 16	free agency	n/a	Adrian Mayes	
Feb. 16	signed	Rob Murphy	n/a (free agent)	BC Lions
Feb. 17	signed	Dominic Picard	n/a (free agent)	Winnipeg Blue Bombers
Feb. 19	trade	Zeke Moreno & sixth round 2009 CFL draft pick	Riall Johnson	Winnipeg Blue Bombers
May 28	released	n/a	Mike Vanderjagt	
July 29	trade	Corey Mace & third round picks in 2010 & 2011 CFL drafts	Arland Bruce III	Hamilton Tiger-Cats

=== Preseason ===
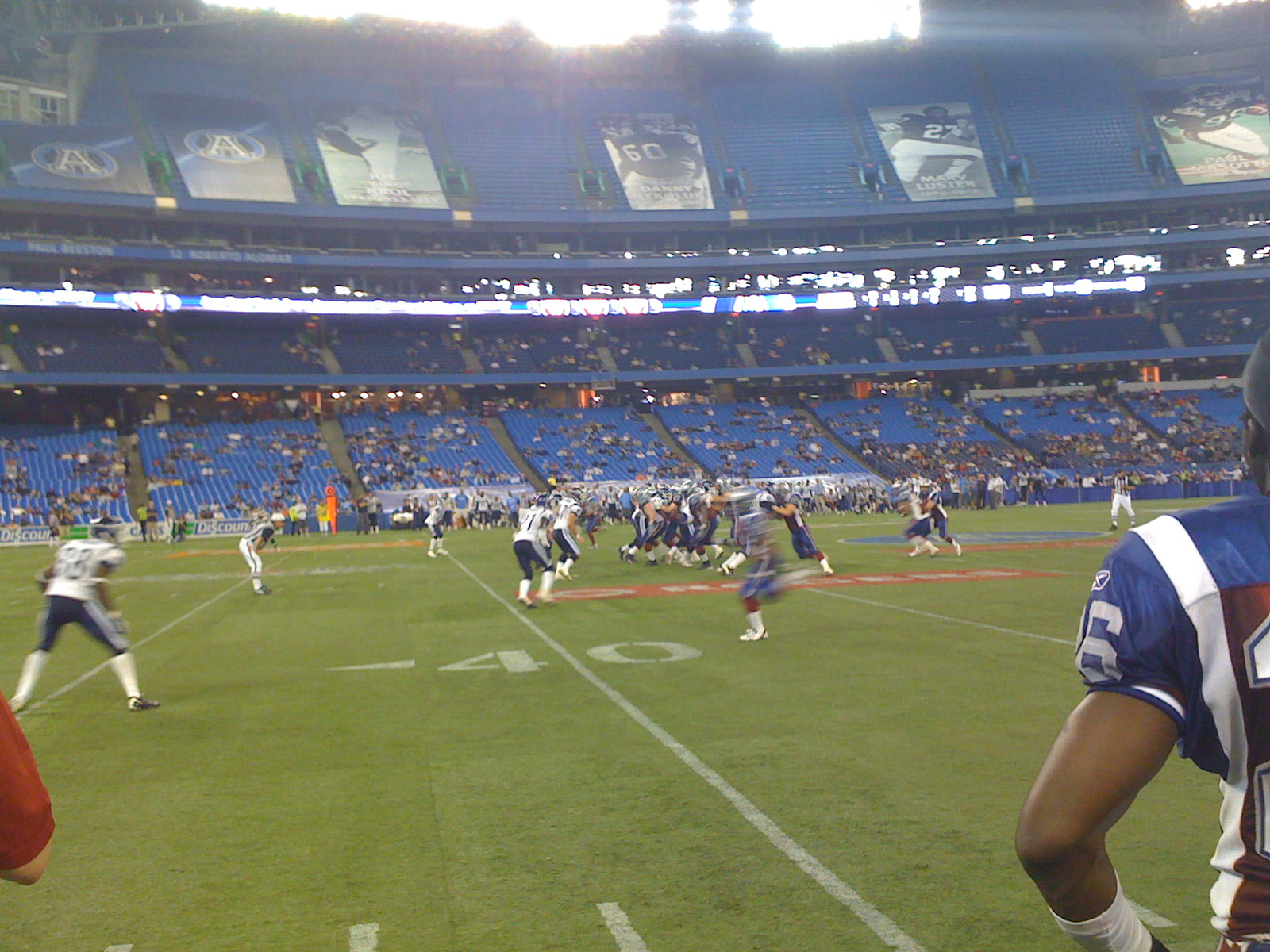
Montreal Alouettes playing the Toronto Argonauts in pre-season at the Rogers Centre on June 17.

Week	Date	Opponent	Location	Final score	Attendance	Record
A	June 17	Alouettes	Rogers Centre	L 37 – 24	18,241	0–1
B	June 23	@ Tiger-Cats	Ivor Wynne Stadium	W 27 – 17	16,225	1–1

== Regular season ==
=== Season standings ===
East Division
Team	GP	W	L	T	PF	PA	Pts	
Montreal Alouettes	18	15	3	0	600	324	30	Details
Hamilton Tiger-Cats	18	9	9	0	449	428	18	Details
Winnipeg Blue Bombers	18	7	11	0	386	508	14	Details
Toronto Argonauts	18	3	15	0	328	502	6	Details

=== Season schedule ===
Win Loss Tie

Week	Date	Opponent	Location	Final score	Attendance	Record
1	July 1	@ Tiger-Cats	Ivor Wynne Stadium	W 30 – 17	23,211	1–0
2	July 11	Roughriders	Rogers Centre	L 46 – 36	30,055	1–1
3	July 17	@ Stampeders	McMahon Stadium	L 44 – 9	33,109	1–2
4	July 24	@ Blue Bombers	Canad Inns Stadium	W 19 – 5	28,466	2–2
5	August 1	Blue Bombers	Rogers Centre	L 13 – 12	23,821	2–3
6	August 7	@ Alouettes	Molson Stadium	L 25 – 0	20,202	2–4
7	August 14	Lions	Rogers Centre	L 36 – 28	24,754	2–5
8	Bye					
9	August 28	Stampeders	Rogers Centre	L 23 – 20	25,329	2–6
10	September 7	@ Tiger-Cats	Ivor Wynne Stadium	L 34 – 15	30,293	2–7
11	September 11	Tiger-Cats	Rogers Centre	W 25 – 22 (2OT)	26,421	3–7
12	September 19	@ Lions	BC Place Stadium	L 23 – 17	27,515	3–8
13	September 26 †	@ Blue Bombers	Canad Inns Stadium	L 29 – 24	22,446	3–9
14	October 3	Alouettes	Rogers Centre	L 27 – 8	26,828	3–10
15	October 10	@ Roughriders	Mosaic Stadium	L 32 – 22	29,361	3–11
16	October 16	Eskimos	Rogers Centre	L 22 – 19	26,515	3–12
17	October 23	Tiger-Cats	Rogers Centre	L 26 – 17	25,352	3–13
18	October 30	@ Eskimos	Commonwealth Stadium	L 36 – 10	30,012	3–14
19	November 7	Alouettes	Rogers Centre	L 42 – 17	28,293	3–15

- † Canadian Football Hall of Fame Game

=== Week 1: at Hamilton Tiger-Cats ===
	1	2	3	4	Total
Argonauts	20	3	7	0	30
Tiger-Cats	0	10	0	7	17

at Ivor Wynne Stadium, Hamilton, Ontario

- Game time: 7:00 PM EDT
- Game weather: 18 °C (Rainy)
- Game attendance: 23,211
- Referee: Kim Murphy
- TV announcers: (TSN): Rod Black & Duane Forde

The Argonauts began the season on Canada Day at the Ti-Cats' home stadium and it didn't take long for the traditional rivalry to heat up.

Argonauts Jamal Robertson and Adriano Belli both received players of the week honours for their play in the game. Running back Jamal Robertson's career-high single-game 200 combined yards (134 rushing yards, 53 receiving yards, 13 kickoff return yards) and 1 touchdown earned him the CFL Offensive Player of the Week award while Belli was awarded the Canadian Player of the Week for giving Hamilton quarterback Quinton Porter trouble with two sacks and three tackles in the game.

=== Week 2: vs Saskatchewan Roughriders ===
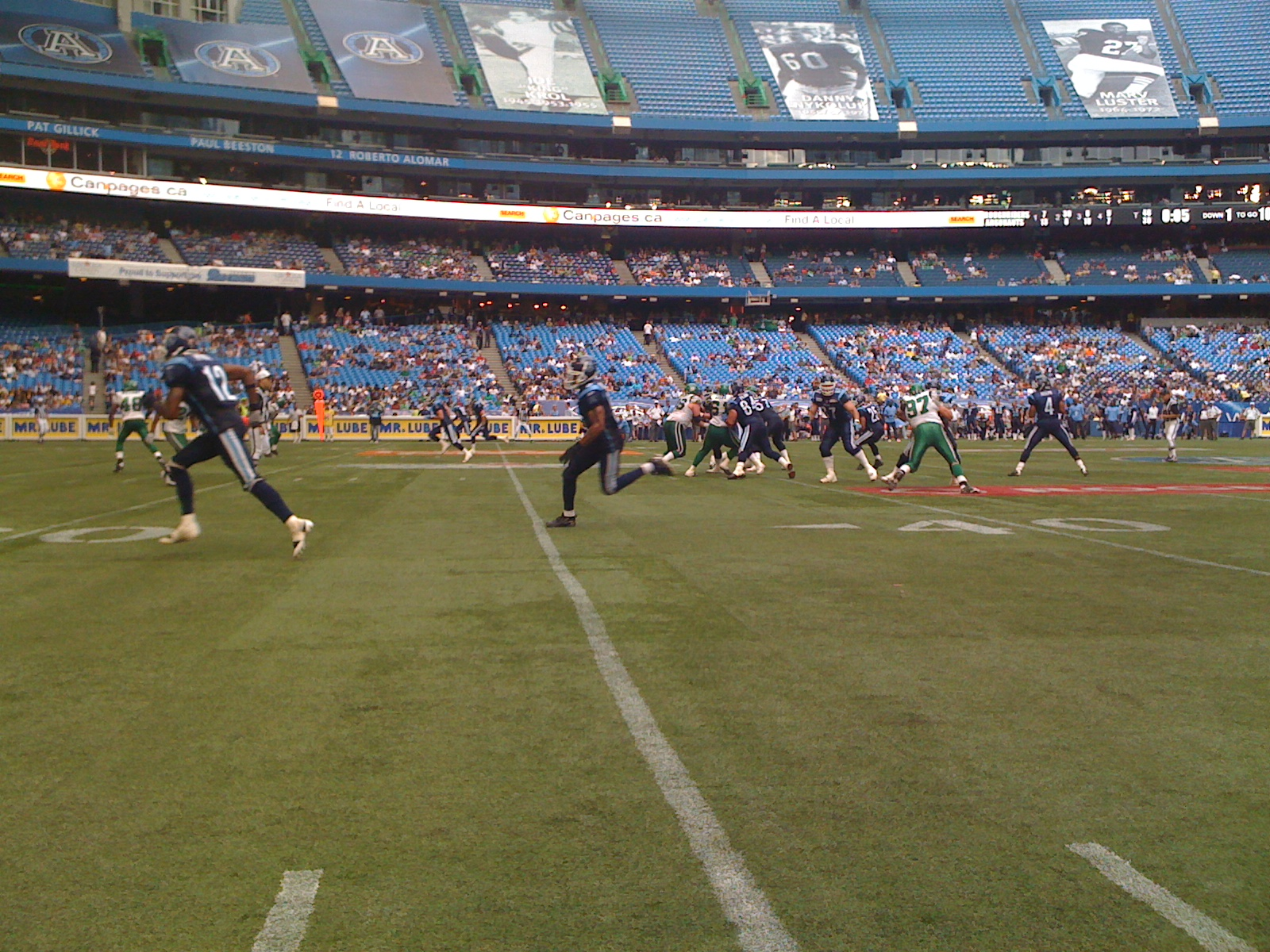
Kerry Joseph (4) drops back to throw a touchdown pass to Mike Bradwell late in the 4th quarter. (Rogers Centre, July 11)

	1	2	3	4	Total
Roughriders	7	30	0	9	46
Argonauts	13	0	10	13	36

at Rogers Centre, Toronto

- Game time: 1:00 PM EDT
- Game weather: 23 °C (1st half: Roof closed/2nd half: Partly cloudy)
- Game attendance: 30,055
- Referee: Glen Johnson
- TV announcers: (TSN): Gord Miller, Matt Dunigan, & Claude Feig

Toronto lost their home opener July 11 versus Saskatchewan by a score of 46–36. The Argonauts committed 12 penalties for 124 yards, 109 yards of which were in the first half. The Argonauts opened the game strongly by scoring a touchdown on their opening drive and scoring a field goal after blocking a Luca Congi field goal try to take an early 10–0 lead. Toronto penalties assisted a Saskatchewan drive for a touchdown to make it 10–7. Then, Toronto kicker Justin Medlock made another field goal to end the first quarter with a 13–7 lead. In the second quarter, Toronto allowed Saskatchewan to score thirty unanswered points. Toronto came back in the second half scoring three touchdowns and a field goal and holding Saskatchewan to three field goals but ended up losing by 10. After the game, an angry coach Andrus said that players needed to control the penalties. Adriano Belli in particular, who took 4 penalties for 44 yards in the first half including a head butt that continued the Roughriders first drive for a touchdown, took some criticism: "If he wants to be a WWE wrestler, then he can go do that, but he is not going to do on my football team", said Andrus.

=== Week 3: at Calgary Stampeders ===
	1	2	3	4	Total
Argonauts	3	6	0	0	9
Stampeders	7	6	14	17	44

at McMahon Stadium, Calgary

- Game time: 7:00 PM MDT
- Game weather: 23 °C (Sky clear, Wind 22 km/h)
- Game attendance: 33,109
- Referee: Murray Clarke
- TV announcers: (TSN): Chris Cuthbert, Glen Suitor, & Sara Orlesky

Toronto lost their second game in a row and again a series of errors in a short period of time helped the opponents to score but this time it was the offence and turnovers that gave the Stampeders a big win. The Argonauts gave up the ball five times in all but the game broke open with two turnovers within 75 seconds in the second half. On the final play of the third quarter, Stampeders linebacker Dwaine Carpenter stripped the ball from quarterback Kerry Joseph and returned it 55 yards for a touchdown and on the next Argos drive, Calgary defensive back Dwight Anderson intercepted a Joseph pass and ran it back 52 yards for another touchdown to make the score 34 to 9. Yet another interception later in the fourth quarter by cornerback Brandon Browner gave the Stampeders three defensive touchdowns and a commanding 44 to 9 victory.

=== Week 4: at Winnipeg Blue Bombers ===
	1	2	3	4	Total
Argonauts	3	13	3	0	19
Blue Bombers	3	0	0	2	5

at Canad Inns Stadium, Winnipeg

- Game time: 6:00 PM CDT
- Game weather: 19 °C (Partly cloudy, Wind 25 km/h)
- Game attendance: 28,466
- Referee: Bud Steen
- TV announcers: (TSN): Chris Cuthbert, Glen Suitor, & Sara Orlesky

=== Week 5: vs Winnipeg Blue Bombers ===
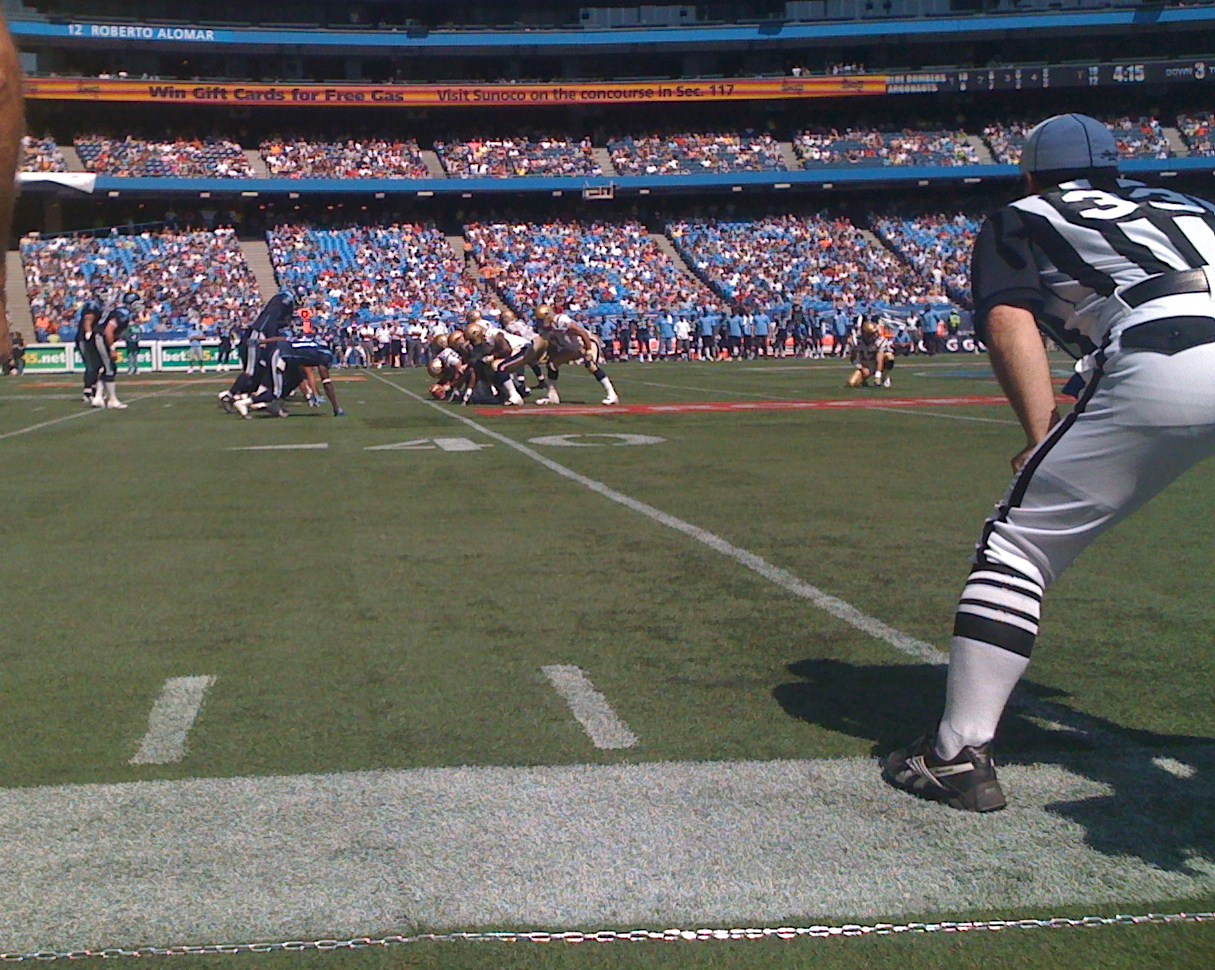
Winnipeg lines up for Alexis Serna's game-winning field goal late in 4th quarter

	1	2	3	4	Total
Blue Bombers	10	0	0	3	13
Argonauts	0	7	2	3	12

at Rogers Centre, Toronto

- Game time: 1:00 PM EDT
- Game weather: 27 °C (Sunny, Wind 11 km/h)
- Game attendance: 23,821
- Referee: Glen Johnson
- TV announcers: (TSN): Rod Black, Duane Forde, & John Lu

This game marked an anniversary of losing at the Rogers Centre, as it officially marked one year without a home victory for the Argonauts. Kerry Joseph had one touchdown throw (to Chad Lucas) but was intercepted four times while the Argos coughed up two additional fumbles (one by Joseph on a sack).

=== Week 6: at Montreal Alouettes ===
	1	2	3	4	Total
Argonauts	0	0	0	0	0
Alouettes	1	15	0	9	25

at Percival Molson Memorial Stadium, Montreal

- Game time: 7:30 PM EDT
- Game weather: 19 °C (clear, wind 17 km/h)
- Game attendance: 20,202
- Referee: Andre Proulx
- TV announcers: (TSN): Rod Black, Duane Forde, and Brent Wallace

The Argos suffered a 25–0 blanking at the hands of the Montreal Alouettes. It was the first time the Argos had been shut out in seventeen years, and the first time a CFL team was shut out in seventeen years.

=== Week 7: vs BC Lions ===
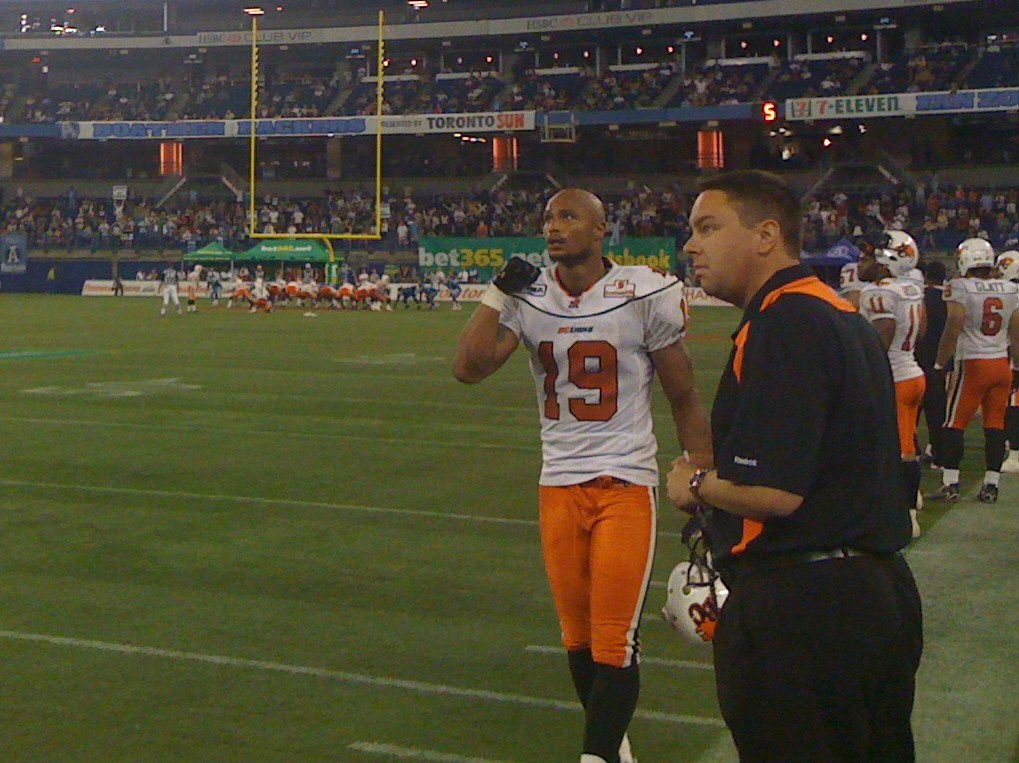
Paris Jackson watches the videoboard as Sean Whyte kicks the go-ahead field goal late in the fourth quarter.

	1	2	3	4	Total
Lions	0	7	7	22	36
Argonauts	6	13	6	3	28

at Rogers Centre, Toronto

- Game time: 7:30 PM EDT
- Game weather: 25 °C (Sunny, Wind 9 km/h)
- Game attendance: 24,754
- Referee: Andre Proulx
- TV announcers: (TSN): Rod Black, Duane Forde, & Claude Feig

After a humiliating shutout loss the past week, Cody Pickett was given the job of starting quarterback. The game started off with Zeke Moreno intercepting a pass from BC Lions quarterback Buck Pierce. Toronto was leading 9–0, but after Buck Pierce was taken out of the game as a result of concussion-like symptoms, BC's second-string quarterback Jarious Jackson came in and led the Lions to their first touchdown of the game. The Argos responded by delivering a touchdown pass to Reggie McNeal. Although the Argos had a lot of trouble finding the endzone throughout the game, kicker Justin Medlock helped them keep the lead by kicking field goals. Medlock would score seven field goals, tying Lance Chomyc's Argonauts team record and just short of the league record of eight shared by Dave Ridgway, Mark McLoughlin, and Paul Osbaldiston.

Heading into the third quarter, BC head coach Wally Buono decided to switch to his third stringer Travis Lulay since Jackson wasn't getting them anywhere. However, Lulay got injured leaving Jarious Jackson as the Lions only quarterback left standing. When Jackson came back in, he instantly threw a touchdown pass to Paris Jackson to cut Toronto's lead 22–14. In response, Justin Medlock kicked another field goal to increase the Argos lead 25–14.

BC scored two more touchdowns but failed on both of the two point converts they attempted. With Toronto leading 28–26 with just nine seconds remaining on the game clock, BC's rookie kicker Sean Whyte kicked the game-winning field goal to give BC the lead at 29–28. On the final play of the game, Ryan Phillips intercepted Reggie McNeal's attempted lateral and returned it for a touchdown.

It was the Argo's ninth straight loss both at Rogers Centre and against the Lions.

=== Week 8: BYE WEEK ===
The Argos headed into the bye week at 2–5.

=== Week 9: vs Calgary Stampeders ===
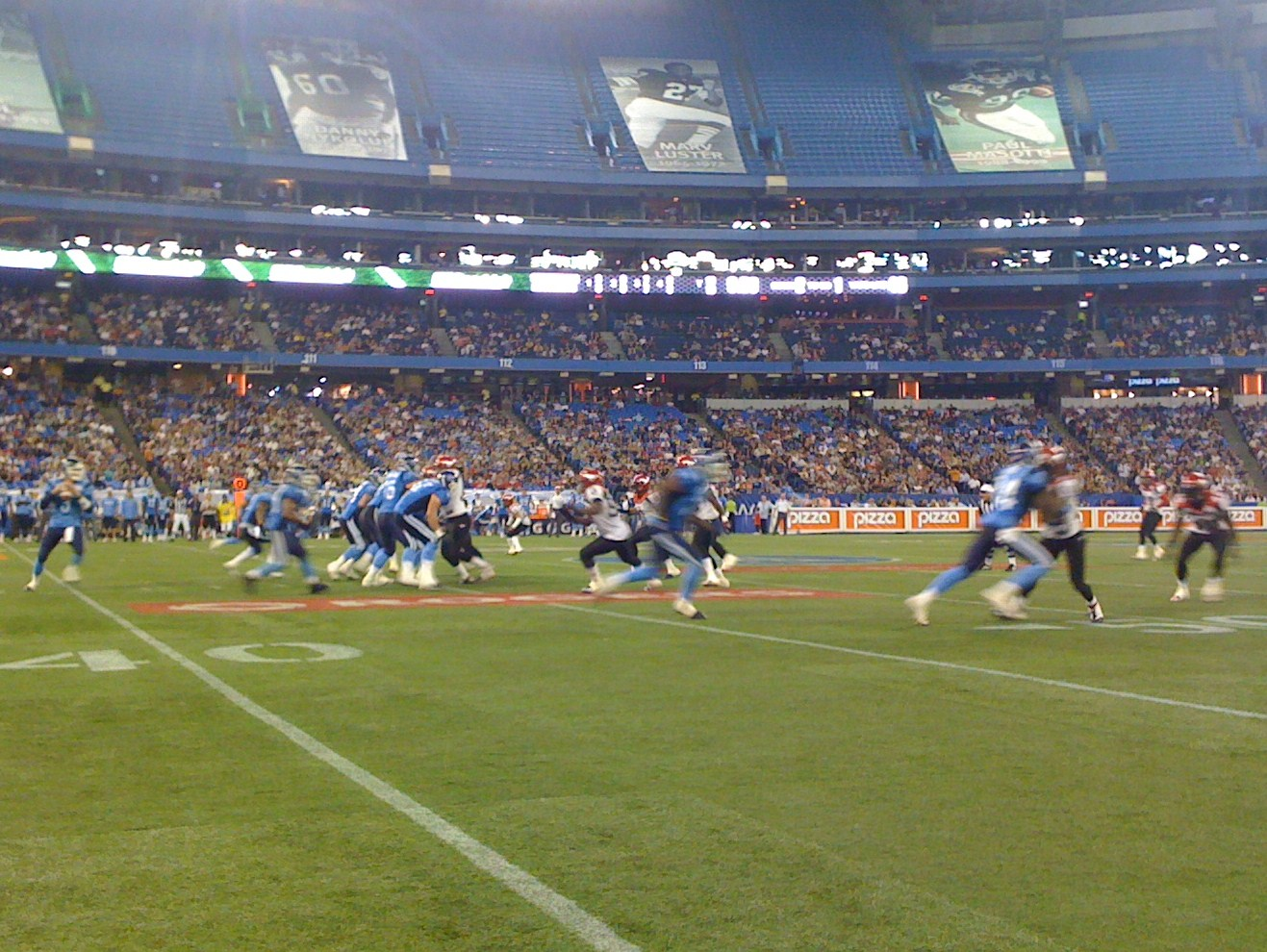
QB Cody Pickett (3) prepares to pass midway through the fourth quarter.

	1	2	3	4	Total
Stampeders	3	0	7	13	23
Argonauts	3	0	7	10	20

at Rogers Centre, Toronto

- Game time: 7:30 PM EDT
- Game weather: Roof closed
- Game attendance: 25,329
- Referee: Kim Murphy
- TV announcers: (TSN): Chris Cuthbert, Glen Suitor, Katherine Dolan

== Statistics ==
=== Offence ===
==== Passing ====
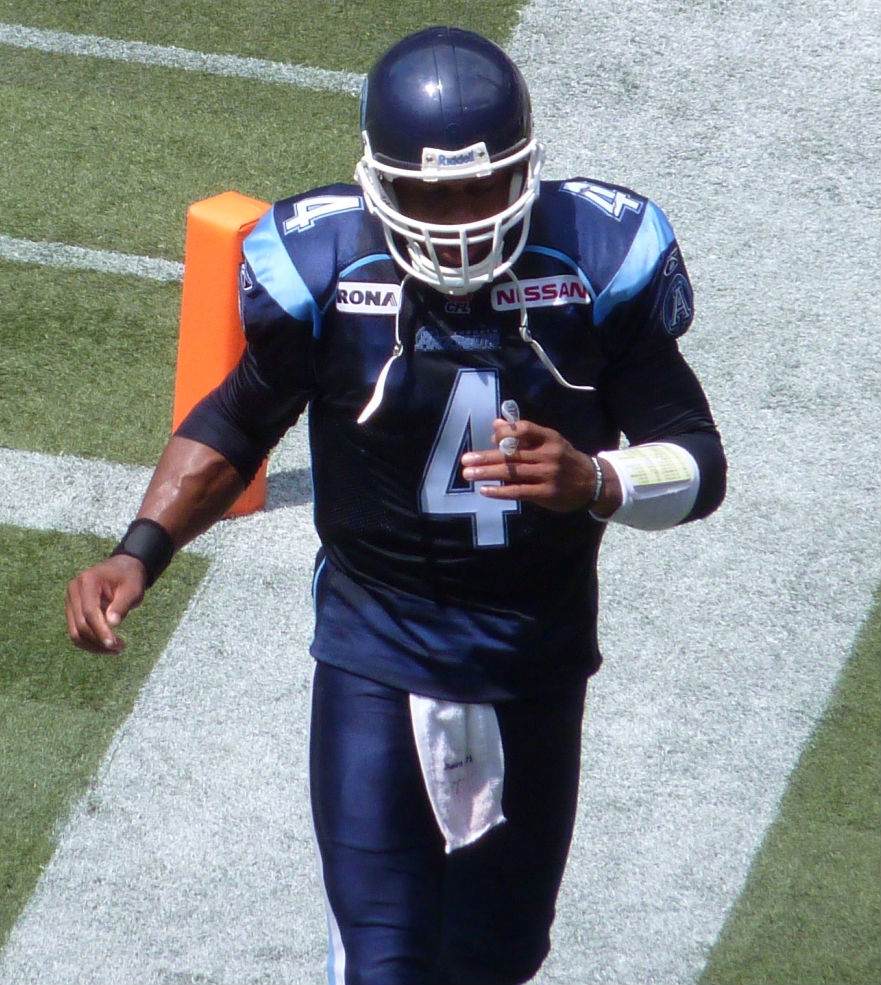
Kerry Joseph

Player	Att	Comp	%	Yards	TD	INT	Rating
Kerry Joseph	192	109	56.8%	1303	7	10	68.1
Cody Pickett	51	32	62.7%	409	1	0	94.3

==== Rushing ====
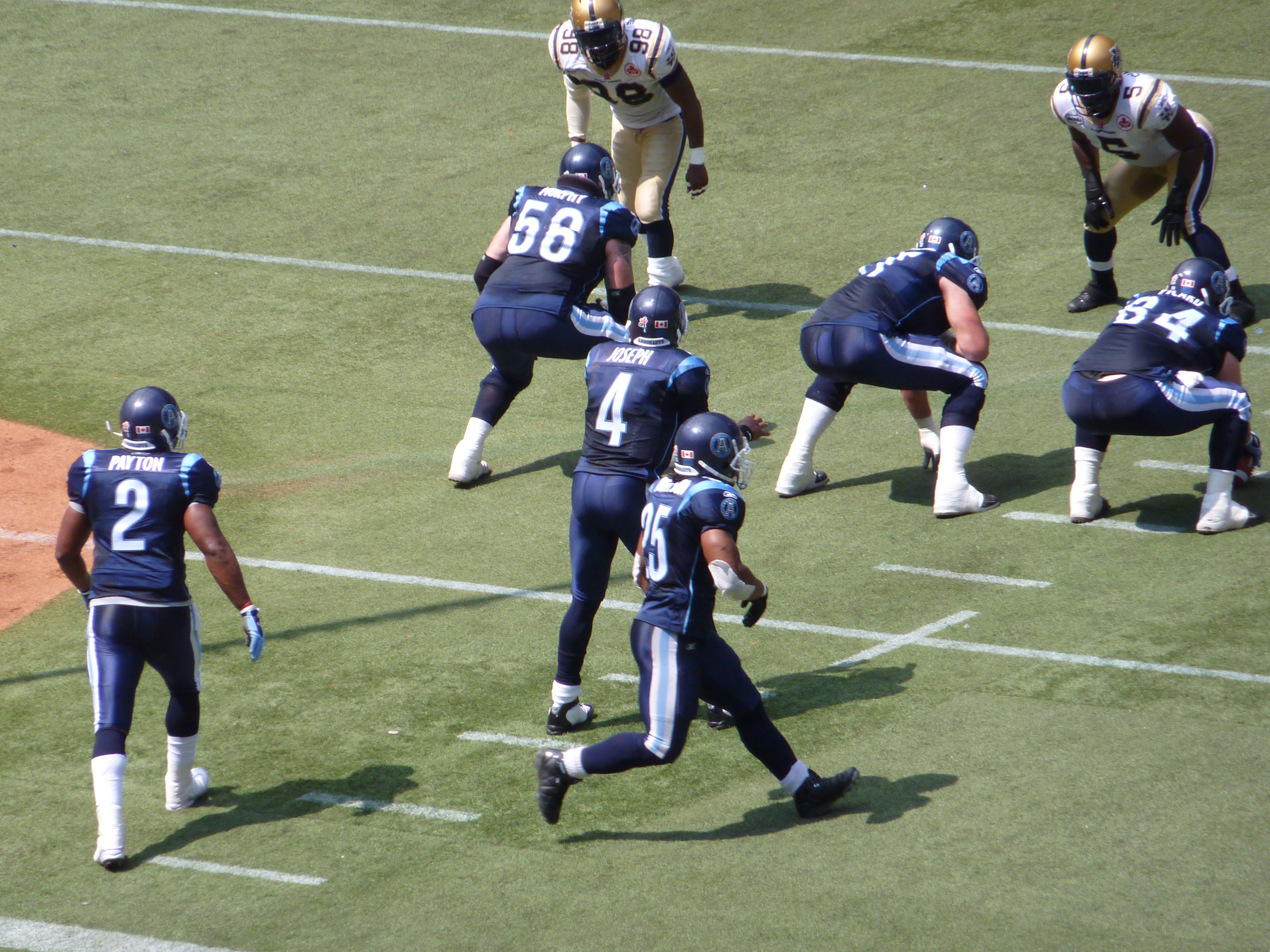
Joseph, Payton, and Robertson in the backfield

Player	Att	Yards	Avg	TD	Fumbles
Jamal Robertson	82	455	5.5	3	3
Kerry Joseph	28	191	6.8	0	4
Bryan Crawford	5	23	4.6	0	0
Cody Pickett	5	20	4.0	0	0
Jarrett Payton	3	10	3.3	0	0

==== Receiving ====
Player	Catches	Yards	Avg	Longest	TD
Reggie McNeal	20	279	14.0	52	3
Jamal Robertson	23	250	10.9	37	0
Chad Lucas	15	240	16.0	38	1
Mike Bradwell	15	233	15.5	40	1
Arland Bruce	14	199	14.2	38	1
Cory Rodgers	12	130	10.8	35	0
Tyler Scott	9	128	14.2	27	1

== Postseason ==
After finishing last in the East division, the Argonauts failed to qualify for the 2009 CFL playoffs.

== Roster ==
2009 Toronto Argonauts final roster
Quarterbacks: 4 Kerry Joseph; 3 Cody Pickett; 17 Stephen Reaves; Running backs: 38 Amos Allen; 40 Bryan Crawford; 26 Andre Durie; 33 Jeff Johnson; 25 Jamal Robertson; Receivers: 88 Mike Bradwell; 84 Chad Lucas; 12 Reggie McNeal; 14 P. K. Sam; 15 Tyler Scott; 80 Brad Smith	Offensive linemen: 63 Shannon Boatman T; 53 Mark Dewit G/C; 58 Scott Evans T/G; 56 Rob Murphy T; 64 Dominic Picard C; 65 Taylor Robertson G; 54 Chris Van Zeyl T/G; Defensive linemen: 78 Adriano Belli DT; 97 Jonathan Brown DE; 98 Walter Curry DT; 90 Adrian Davis DT; 99 Ronald Flemons DE; 94 Kevin Huntley DT; 93 Étienne Légaré DT/DE; Special teams: 7 Justin Medlock K/P	Linebackers: 35 Kevin Eiben; 51 Raymond Fontaine; 43 James Green; 47 Kyle Jones; 8 Zeke Moreno; 10 Willie Pile; 46 Jason Pottinger; Defensive backs: 39 Matt Black; 24 Dovonte Edwards; 36 Alphonso Hodge; 27 Sammy Joseph; 6 Jason Shivers; Reserve roster: 11 Delroy Clarke DB; 34 Dominique Dorsey RB; 21 Lin-J Shell DB; 26 Jordan Younger DB	Injured list: 16 Obed Cétoute WR; 92 Claude Harriott DT; 29 Pete Hunter DB; 13 Eddie Johnson K/P; 67 Jeff Keeping G; 85 Matt Lambros WR; 23 Willie Middlebrooks DB; 20 Will Poole DB; 57 Brian Ramsay T; 82 Chad Rempel LS/WR; 81 Steve Schmidt TE; 9 Andre Talbot SB; Suspended: -- Clifford Dukes DT; 45 Randy Srochenski LS; Italics indicates American player Roster updated 2026-04-24
