= Northland =

Northland may refer to:

== Corporations ==
- Northland Communications, an American cable television, telephone and internet service provider
- Northland Organic Foods Corporation, headquartered in Saint Paul, Minnesota
- Northland Resources, a mining business
- Northland Properties, the parent company of multiple hotel chains, restaurants, sports teams and properties
- Northland Securities, an investment firm and subsidiary of FNBO

== Places ==
=== Australia ===
- Northland Shopping Centre, in Melbourne

=== Canada ===
- Northland Village Mall, in Calgary, Alberta
- Northland Pyrite Mine, in Temagami, Ontario

=== New Zealand ===
- Northland (New Zealand electorate), northern New Zealand
- Northland Peninsula, northern New Zealand
- Northland region, northern New Zealand
- Northland, Wellington, suburb

=== Singapore ===
- Northland Primary School

=== United States ===
- Northland, Waupaca County, Wisconsin, an unincorporated community
- The Northland, a section of the Kansas City metropolitan area
- Northland Center, in Southfield, Michigan
- Buzz Westfall Plaza on the Boulevard, formerly Northland Shopping Center, in Jennings, Missouri
- Northland Mall, a demolished shopping mall in Columbus, Ohio
- Northland Mall (Appleton, Wisconsin), in Appleton, Wisconsin
- Northland International University, formerly Northland Baptist Bible College, in Dunbar, Wisconsin
- Northland Christian School, a high school in Houston, Texas
- Northland College (Wisconsin), in Ashland, Wisconsin
- Northland Community and Technical College, in East Grand Forks, Minnesota
- Northland High School (Columbus, Ohio)
- Northland Pioneer College, in Holbrook, Arizona

== Transportation ==
=== Ships ===
- USCGC Northland (WPG-49), a cutter in service from 1927–1946
- USCGC Northland (WMEC-904), a cutter in service since 1984

=== Trains ===
- Northland (railcar), a passenger car in Duluth, Minnesota, on the U.S. National Register of Historic Places
- Northlander, a Canadian passenger train formerly operated by the Ontario Northland Railway

== Other uses ==
- Northland (film), directed by Ernest Borneman
- Northland, a fictional location in the Shannara novel series by Terry Brooks
- Northland (field hockey team), New Zealand
- Northland Rugby Union, New Zealand

== See also ==
- Northlands (disambiguation)
- Nordland, a county in Norway
- Norrland, an area of Sweden
