= F. E. Osborne Junior High School =

F.E Osborne Junior High

Location
- 5315 Varsity Dr. NW; Calgary, Alberta, T3A 1A7; Canada; 51.0929°N 114.1634°W

Information
- Type: Public
- Motto: Soaring to success
- Established: 1967
- School board: Calgary Board of Education
- Principal: Dr. Michael Cutler
- Grades: 6(Early French program),7,8,9
- Enrollment: 677 (December, 2023)
- Colour: Red/White
- Mascot: Ozzy the Eagle
- Communities served: Hawkwood, Varsity, Sage Hill, Silver Springs, Montgomery.
- Feeder schools: Hawkwood Elementary, Marion Carson Elementary, Silver Springs Elementary.
- Website: schools.cbe.ab.ca/b651/

F. E. Osborne Junior High School (Also known as F.E.O) is a public junior high school in the Varsity neighborhood, in Calgary, Alberta. It serves the communities of Hawkwood, Varsity, Sage Hill, Silver Springs, and Montgomery. It has a total enrollment of 677 students for the 2024-25 school year. Its students are primarily in grades 7-9, but its early French immersion program goes from grades 6-9. The school mascots name is Ozzy the Eagle, named after F.E Osborne

The school is named after former Calgary mayor and alderman Frederick Ernest Osborne.

== Facilities ==
- Gymnasium
- Music Room
- Woodworking
- Library
- 3 Science Labs
- Foods/cooking room
- Fitness Room
- Art Room
- Guidance Counseller and Medical Room
- 2 Computer Labs

== Extra curricular ==
=== Clubs ===
The clubs at F.E. Osborne are, among others:

- Art Club
- Debate Team
- Yearbook
- Model UN
- Leadership (School Dances, Fundraisers, Intramurals etc.)
- Band
- Tour band
- Jazz band
- Choir
- Games Club
- Crochet Club
- GSA (Gay-straight Alliance)
- Sum it up (After-school help with homework)
- D&D Club

=== Athletics ===
The school team is named the F.E Osborne Eagles. Their jersey colors are primarily red and white as the mascot and logo colors are the same.

==== Teams ====
- Junior and Senior Girls Volleyball
- Junior and Senior Boys Volleyball
- Junior and Senior Girls Basketball
- Junior and Senior Boys Basketball
- Girls Soccer
- Boys Soccer
- Cross Country Running Team
- Badminton
- Track and Field
