= Symons Valley, Calgary =

Symons Valley
- Area
- Location of Symons Valley in Calgary
- Coordinates: 51°09′27″N 114°08′55″W
- Country: Canada
- Province: Alberta
- City: Calgary
- Quadrant: NW
- Ward: 2, 3

Government
  - Administrative body: Calgary City Council
  - Councillors: Jennifer Wyness and Jasmine Mian
- Elevation: 1,170 m (3,840 ft)

Population (2006)
  - Total: 2,658

Symons Valley is the residential area in the northwest quadrant of Calgary, Alberta, Canada that comprises numerous neighbourhoods. It is bounded by the city's boundary with Rocky View County to the north, Stoney Trail to the south, and Sarcee Trail to the west. It is bisected by Symons Valley Road, which becomes Highway 772.

It is represented in the Calgary City Council by Ward 2 and 3 Councillor Jennifer Wyness and Jasmine Mian.

== Communities ==
- Evanston - Developers: Qualico Developments, Hopewell Communities (Creekside), Genesis Land Development Inc, Dundee Developments (Evans Ridge)
- Kincora - Developers: Apex Land (Kincora and Kincora Glen), Genesis Land Development Inc (Kincora by Genesis)
- Nolan Hill - Developer: United Communities
- Sage Hill - Developers: United Communities, Genesis Land Development Inc (Sage Meadows and Sage Hill Crossing Shopping Centre)
- Sherwood - Developers: Genesis Land Development Inc (Sherwood Estates), Melcor (Sherwood), Intergulf-Cidex (Beacon Heights)

== Demographics ==
In 2006 the neighbourhood had a population of 3,598.

== See also ==
- List of neighbourhoods in Calgary
