= Nolan Hill =

- Neighbourhood
- Location of Nolan Hill in Alberta
- Coordinates: 51.175°N 114.160°W
- Country: Canada
- Province: Alberta
- City: Calgary
- Quadrant: NW
- Ward: 2

Government
  - Mayor: Jeromy Farkas
  - Administrative body: Calgary City Council
  - Councillor: Jennifer Wyness (Independent)

Population (2016)
  - Total: 3,756
- Time zone: UTC-7 (Mountain)
- Area code: 403 587

Nolan Hill is a residential neighbourhood in the northwest quadrant of Calgary, Alberta, Canada. Located near the north edge of the city, it is bounded by Sarcee Trail to the west, 144 Avenue N.W. to the north, the Sage Hill community across Shaganappi Trail to the east, and the Sherwood community across Symons Valley Parkway N.W. to the south. It is one of five communities in the Symons Valley area.

Nolan Hill is in Calgary City Council's Ward 2.

== Demographics ==
In the City of Calgary's 2016 municipal census, Nolan Hill had a population of 3,756 living in 1,583 dwellings, a change of 118% since recording a population of 1,723 in 2015.

== See also ==
- List of neighbourhoods in Calgary
