= Sherwood, Calgary =

Neighbourhood in Calgary, Canada

Sherwood
- Neighbourhood
- Location of Sherwood in Calgary
- Coordinates: 51.15260°N 114.16011°W
- Country: Canada
- Province: Alberta
- City: Calgary
- Quadrant: NW
- Ward: 2

Government
  - Administrative body: Calgary City Council

Sherwood is a residential neighbourhood in the northwest quadrant of Calgary, Alberta, Canada. Located near the north edge of the city, it is bounded by Sarcee Trail to the west, the Nolan Hill community across 128 Avenue N.W./ Symons Valley Parkway to the north, the Kincora community across Shaganappi Trail to the east, and the Hamptons community across Stoney Trail to the south. It is one of five communities located within the Symons Valley area.

Sherwood is represented in the Calgary City Council by the Ward 2 councillor.

== Demographics ==
In the City of Calgary's 2012 municipal census, Sherwood had a population of 2,523 living in 979 dwellings, a 19.6% increase from its 2011 population of 2,109. With a land area of 2.4 km^{2} (0.93 sq mi), it had a population density of 1,051/km^{2} (2,720/sq mi) in 2012.

== Sherwood Education ==
The Sherwood Community Association was established in 2008 by a group of volunteer residents to create community led events around the year. Residents can sign up for a $25/year membership aimed at raising funds for such events. The most popular event in the community is the annual summer Multicultural Festival. They have introduced a new community garden set to open in 2017.

In 2016, Sherwood agreed with the Calgary Catholic School District to open a school in the community named Blessed Marie-Rose after the late Marie Rose Durocher. The manufacture of the school started on May 6 2016 at approximately 2:00PM. The school was first opened on September 4 2018.

== See also ==
- List of neighbourhoods in Calgary
