= Stephen Reaves =

American football player (born 1984)

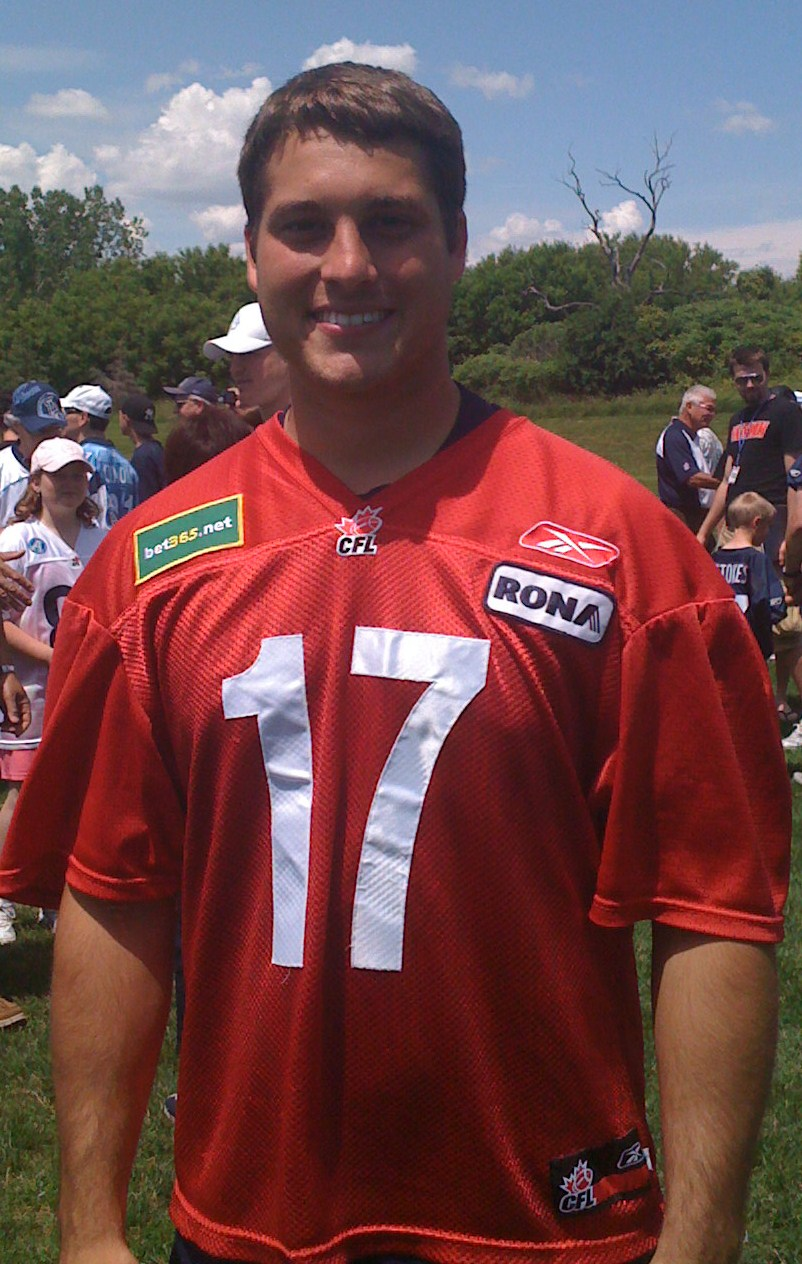
- Reaves with the Toronto Argonauts in 2009

No. 17
- Position: Quarterback

Personal information
- Born: December 5, 1984 (age 41); Tampa, Florida, U.S.
- Listed height: 6 ft 1 in (1.85 m)
- Listed weight: 208 lb (94 kg)

Career information
- High school: Plant (Tampa)
- College: Michigan State (2003–2004); Southern Miss (2005–2007)
- NFL draft: 2008: undrafted

Career history

Playing
- 2009: Toronto Argonauts

Coaching
- 2008: Oakland Raiders (Coaching intern)
- Stats at CFL.ca (archive)

Stephen Reaves (born December 5, 1984) is an American former professional football player who was a quarterback for the Toronto Argonauts of the Canadian Football League (CFL). He played college football for the Southern Miss Golden Eagles and Michigan State Spartans.

== Early life ==
Stephen Reaves was born on December 5, 1984, in Tampa, Florida. He attended Henry B. Plant High School in Tampa.

== College career ==
Reaves started his career as a redshirt freshman at Michigan State University. In the 2003 season, Reaves did not play a down and learned from starting quarterback Jeff Smoker.

In 2004, Reaves played his first game against Central Michigan in the second game of the season. He played in four games in 2004. It end up being his last year at Michigan State due to driving while under the influence of alcohol. Michigan State University took away his scholarship. He committed to the University of Southern Mississippi. By NCAA rule, Reaves had to sit out the 2005 season.

Reaves played six games in the 2006 season. His first game played for Southern Miss was a blowout loss to the Florida Gators. Reaves and the Golden Eagles won the C–USA East Division champion and lost in the C–USA Championship. They also ended the season with a win in the GMAC Bowl against Ohio by a score of 28–7.

Reaves played eight games in his senior season in 2007. He played in a blowout win against Tennessee–Martin. Reaves and the Golden Eagles ended the season with a loss in the PapaJohns.com Bowl against Cincinnati by the score of 31–21.

== Professional career ==
After going undrafted in the 2008 NFL draft, Reaves served as a coaching intern with the Oakland Raiders. On May 11, 2009, he signed with the Toronto Argonauts of the Canadian Football League (CFL), but was released at the end of training camp. He was re-signed to the practice roster on June 27, 2009. On February 22, 2010, Reaves was released by the Argonauts.

== Career statistics ==
=== CFL ===
Year	Team	Passing					
Year	Team	Comp	Att	Pct	Yds	TD	Int
2009	Toronto	33	56	58.9	331	1	6
Career		33	56	58.9	331	1	6

=== College ===
Year	Team	GP	Passing					
Year	Team	GP	Comp	Att	Pct	Yds	TD	Int
2004	Michigan State	5	23	58	39.7	331	2	5
2005	Southern Miss	Ineligible due to NCAA transfer rule						
2006	Southern Miss	8	37	72	51.4	488	2	1
2007	Southern Miss	8	95	151	52.5	943	3	8
Career		21	155	281	55.2	1,762	7	14
