= Evanston, Calgary =

Evanston
- Neighbourhood
- Location of Evanston in Calgary
- Coordinates: 51°09′48″N 114°06′55″W
- Country: Canada
- Province: Alberta
- City: Calgary
- Quadrant: NW
- Ward: 3

Government
  - Mayor: Jeromy Farkas
  - Administrative body: Calgary City Council
  - Councillor: Jennifer Wyness (Independent)
- Elevation: 1,110 m (3,640 ft)

Population (2021)
  - Total: 18,710
- Website: Evanston Community Association

Evanston is a residential neighbourhood in the northwest quadrant of Calgary, Alberta. Located near the north edge of the city, it is bounded by the Kincora community across Shaganappi Trail to the southwest, the Sage Hill community to the west, Sarcee Trail to the west, 144 Avenue N.W. to the north, 14 Street N.W. to the east, and the Panorama Hills and Hidden Valley communities across Stoney Trail to the southeast and south, and Carrington. It is one of five communities located within the Symons Valley area.

Evanston is represented in the Calgary City Council by the Ward 2 councillor.

== Demographics ==
In the City of Calgary's 2012 municipal census, Evanston had a population of 6,594 living in 2,576 dwellings, a 12% increase from its 2011 population of 5,889. With a land area of 4.9 km^{2} (1.9 sq mi), it had a population density of 1,346/km^{2} (3,490/sq mi) in 2012.

== See also ==
- List of neighbourhoods in Calgary
