= Matt Lambros =

Canadian football player (born 1985)

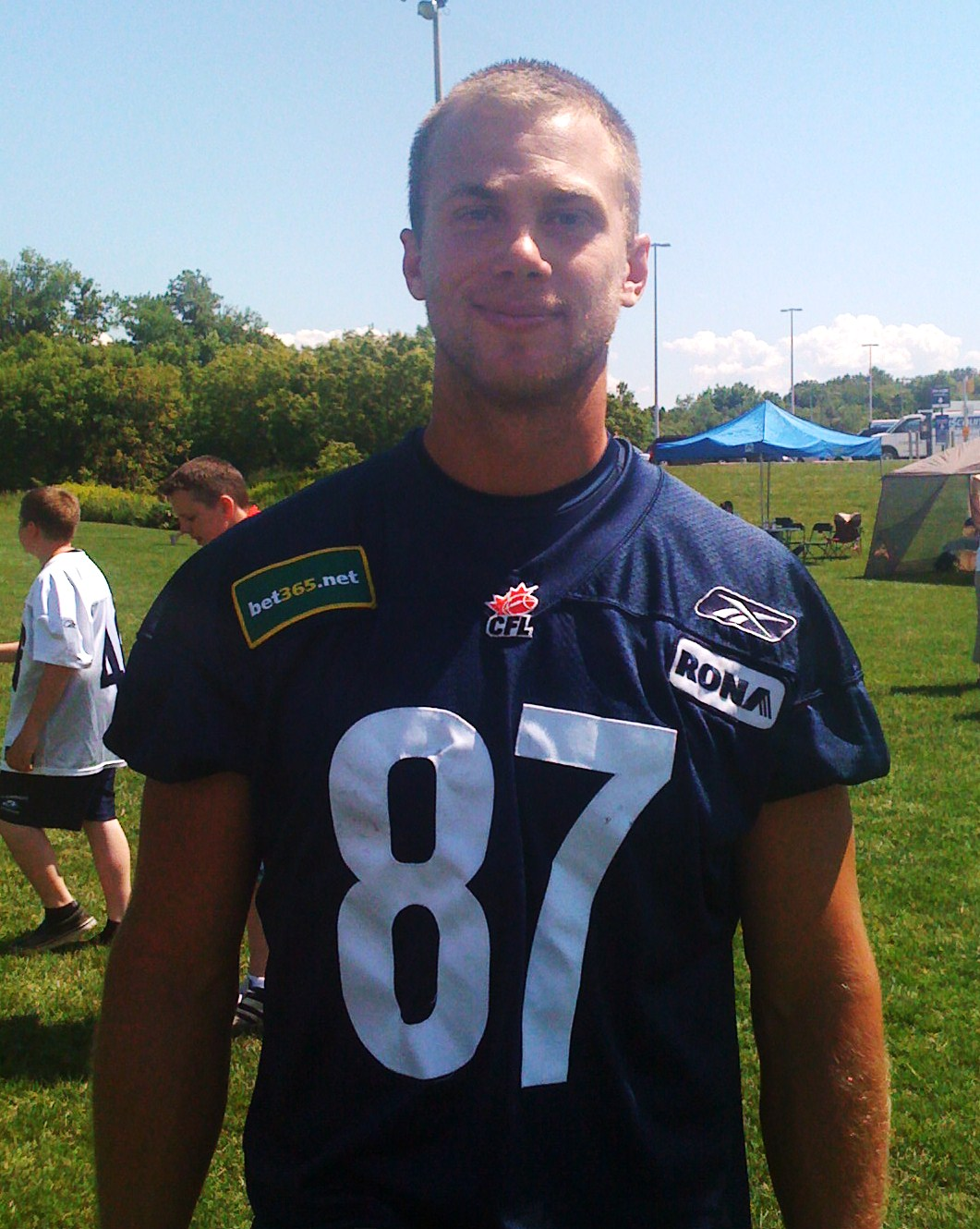
- Lambros with the Toronto Argonauts in 2009

No. 85, 83
- Position: Wide receiver

Personal information
- Born: February 8, 1985 (age 41); Calgary, Alberta, Canada
- Listed height: 6 ft 3 in (1.91 m)
- Listed weight: 210 lb (95 kg)

Career information
- College: Liberty
- CFL draft: 2009: 2nd round, 10th overall pick

Career history
- 2009–2010: Toronto Argonauts
- 2011: Montreal Alouettes
- Stats at CFL.ca

Matthew Lambros (born February 8, 1985) is a Canadian former professional football wide receiver who played in the Canadian Football League (CFL). He was selected by the Toronto Argonauts in the second round of the 2009 CFL draft. He played college football for the Liberty Flames. He was also a member of the Montreal Alouettes.

== Early life ==
Lambros was born February 8, 1985, in Calgary, Alberta. His father, Mike Lambros, was a linebacker with the Edmonton Eskimos from 1972 to 1975. He played football for Sir Winston Churchill High School in Calgary, where he was named Rookie of the Year and was a three-year letter-winner.

On the advice of Jim Barker, who coached a football camp he attended during high school, he chose to attend Liberty University in Lynchburg, Virginia, for college. Lambros played for the Liberty Flames from 2005 to 2008, including the Flames first Big South Conference championships in 2007 and 2008. He was named to the Big South Presidential Honour Roll in 2006 and 2007.

== Professional career ==
Lambros signed with the Argonauts on May 27, 2009, and joined the 2009 Toronto Argonauts season training camp and participated in the pre-season games. He was released from the active roster and signed to the practice roster at the beginning of the regular season but was activated ahead of the first game of the season, where he made both his first catch and first touchdown against the Hamilton Tiger-Cats on July 1, 2009. On June 4, 2010, Lambros was released by the Argonauts.

He was signed by the Montreal Alouettes on February 17, 2011, and released on June 18, 2011. However, he was re-signed by the Alouettes and dressed in one game during the 2011 season.
