= Kincora, Calgary =

Neighbourhood of Calgary, Alberta, Canada

Kincora
- Neighbourhood
- Location of Kincora in Calgary
- Coordinates: 51.15260°N 114.16011°W
- Country: Canada
- Province: Alberta
- City: Calgary
- Quadrant: NW
- Ward: 2

Government
  - Mayor: Jeromy Farkas
  - Administrative body: Calgary City Council
  - Councillor: Jennifer Wyness (Independent)

Kincora is a residential neighbourhood in the northwest quadrant of Calgary, Alberta, Canada. Located near the north edge (SUS) of the city, it is bounded by the Sherwood community across Shaganappi Trail to the west, the Sage Hill community across 128 Avenue N.W. to the north, the Evanston community across Symons Valley Road (Highway 772) to the east, and the Hidden Valley community across Stoney Trail to the south. It is one of five communities located within the Symons Valley area.

Kincora is represented in the Calgary City Council by the Ward 2 councillor.

== Demographics ==
In the City of Calgary's 2012 municipal census, Kincora had a population of 4,876 living in 1,548 dwellings, a 5.4% increase from its 2011 population of 4,625. With a land area of 2.3 km^{2} (0.89 sq mi), it had a population density of 2,120/km^{2} (5,490/sq mi) in 2012.

== See also ==
- List of neighbourhoods in Calgary
