= Northlands =

Northlands may refer to:

- Northlands (organization), a non-profit organization in Edmonton, Alberta, Canada that operated venues in the Edmonton Northlands:
  - Northlands Agricom
  - Northlands Coliseum
  - Northlands Park
- Northlands College, La Ronge, Saskatchewan, Canada
- Northlands Denesuline First Nation, Manitoba, Canada
- Northlands Girls' High School, Durban North, South Africa
- Northlands Park, Basildon, a park in Essex, England
- Northlands Park, Ontario, an unincorporated railway point in northeastern Ontario, Canada
- Northlands Road, a residential road in Southampton where the County Ground, Southampton was formerly located.
- Northlands School, Argentina
- Northlands Shopping Centre, Christchurch, New Zealand
- Nordlandshest/Lyngshest or Northlands pony, a Norwegian horse breed

== See also ==
- Northland (disambiguation)
