= Market Mall =

CF Market Mall
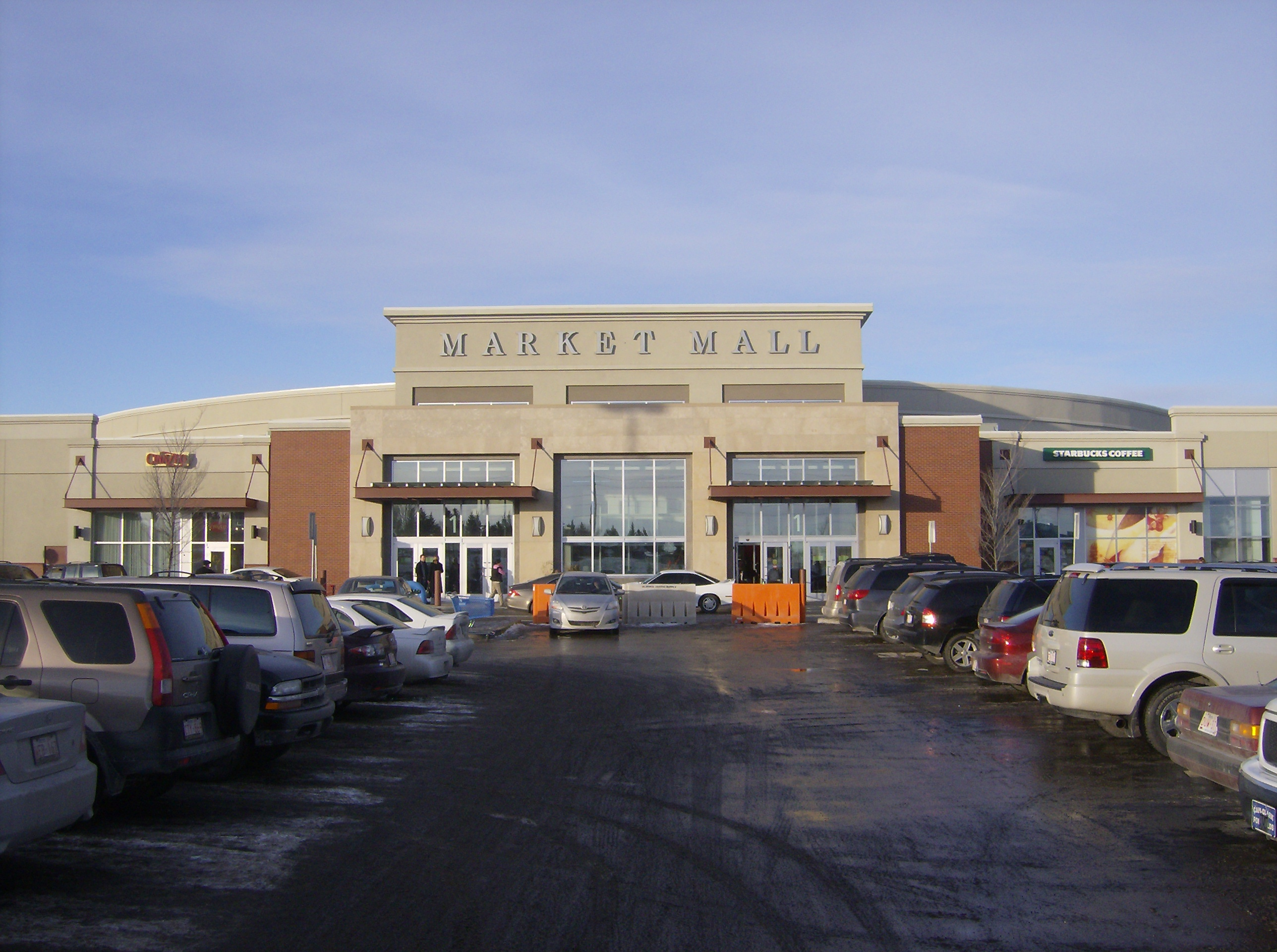
- Mall entrance
- Location: Calgary, Alberta, Canada
- Coordinates: 51°05′05″N 114°09′22″W
- Address: 3625 Shaganappi Trail NW
- Opened: August 4th, 1971; 55 years ago
- Developer: Cadillac Fairview
- Manager: Cadillac Fairview
- Owner: Cadillac Fairview (50%); La Caisse (50%)
- Num. of stores: 229
- Num. of anchor tenants: 7
- Floor area: 907,207 sq ft (84,282.3 m^{2})
- Floors: 1
- Parking: 4,200
- Website: marketmall.ca

Market Mall (formally branded as "CF Market Mall") is a shopping mall in Calgary, Alberta, Canada. It is located in the northwest quadrant of the city in the neighbourhood of Varsity and is one of the largest malls by retail floor space in the Calgary area at 907,207 square feet (84,282.3 m^{2}). The mall is jointly owned (50/50) by Cadillac Fairview and Ivanhoé Cambridge, two of Canada's largest real estate property managers and developers, but is managed by the former.

Location of Market Mall in Calgary

== History ==
Opened on August 4, 1971, one of the original anchor stores were Woodward's Stores Ltd, with their Food Floor and Bargain Centre (which was a separate store in the mall).

In 1977, Famous Players opened at the mall. It was expanded in 1987 and closed in 2002. The mall underwent major expansions in 1988 and 2004. The latest expansion added the south wing, an underground parkade, a larger food court, and a complete renovation of the existing centre. The centre has a one-level 'racetrack' layout, or figure eight.

Logo used until October 2015

In 2012, longtime anchor tenant Zellers closed; it was redeveloped as a Target store, which opened on May 6, 2013, but closed in April 2015.

As of October 5, 2017, the anchor store previously containing Kmart, Zellers, and Target has redeveloped as several smaller retailers, including a Sporting Life and the relocated Homesense.

In late 2019, a "luxury" Landmark Cinemas movie theatre opened in the southwest corner of the mall property where Staples used to be located.

In 2022/23, anchor tenant Toys "R" Us closed and was replaced by Decathlon in 2023/24.

On June 1, 2025, anchor tenant Hudson's Bay closed.

== See also ==
- List of shopping malls in Canada
- List of attractions and landmarks in Calgary
