= Amos Allen (gridiron football) =

American gridiron football player (born 1983)

Profile
- Position: Running back

Personal information
- Born: July 20, 1983 (age 43); Miami, Florida, U.S.
- Listed height: 5 ft 8 in (1.73 m)
- Listed weight: 185 lb (84 kg)

Career information
- College: South Dakota
- NFL draft: 2008: undrafted

Career history
- 2008–2009: BC Lions*
- 2009: Toronto Argonauts
- * Offseason or practice squad member only
- Stats at CFL.ca (archive)

Amos Allen (born July 20, 1983) is a former running back in the Canadian Football League. He was signed by the BC Lions as an undrafted free agent in 2008. He played college football for the South Dakota Coyotes. He also spent a portion of the 2009 CFL season with the Toronto Argonauts. Allen played five regular season games returning punts and kicks for the Argonauts in 2009. On June 5, 2010, Allen was released by the Argonauts.
