= Northland Village Mall =

Northland
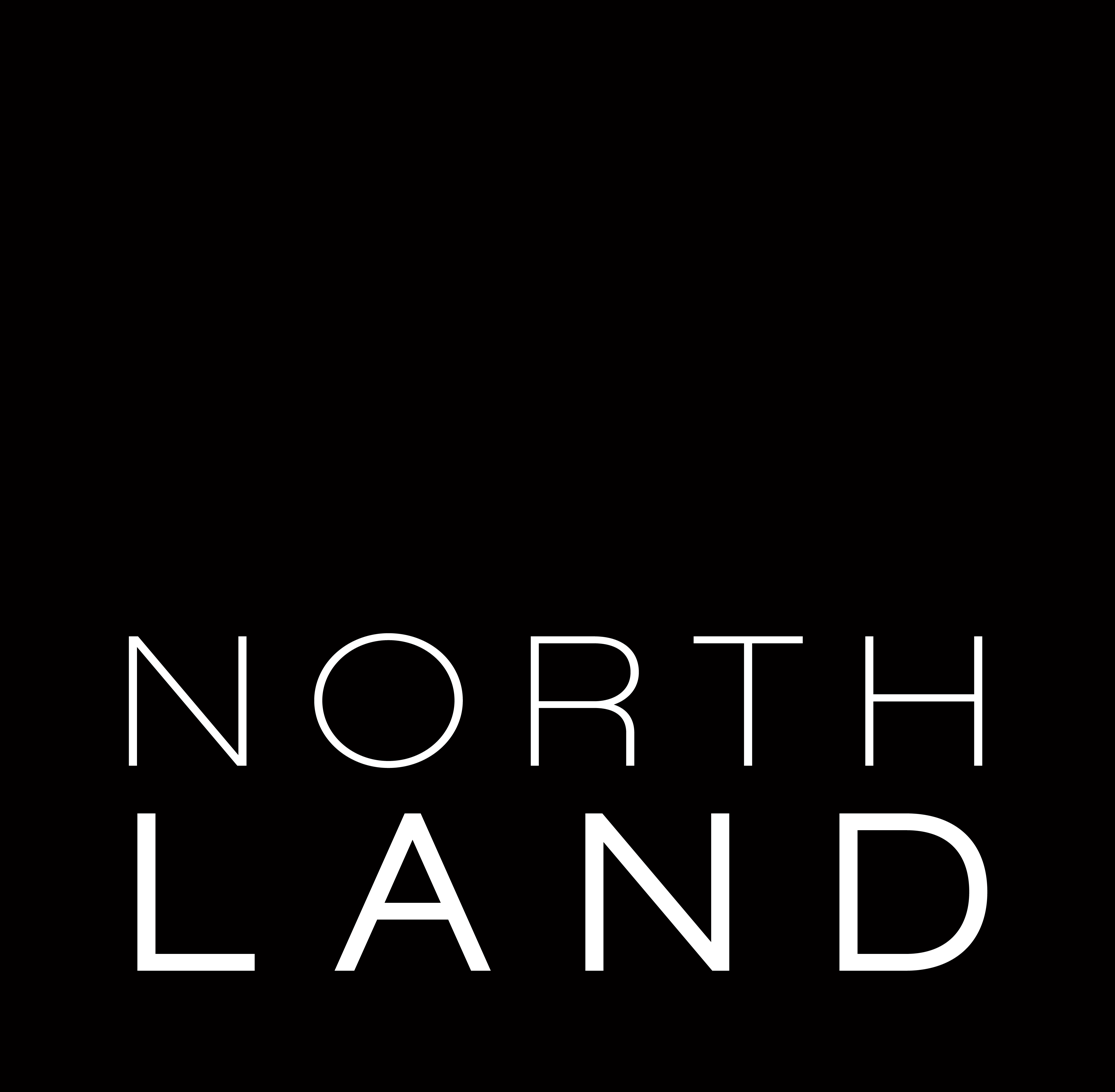

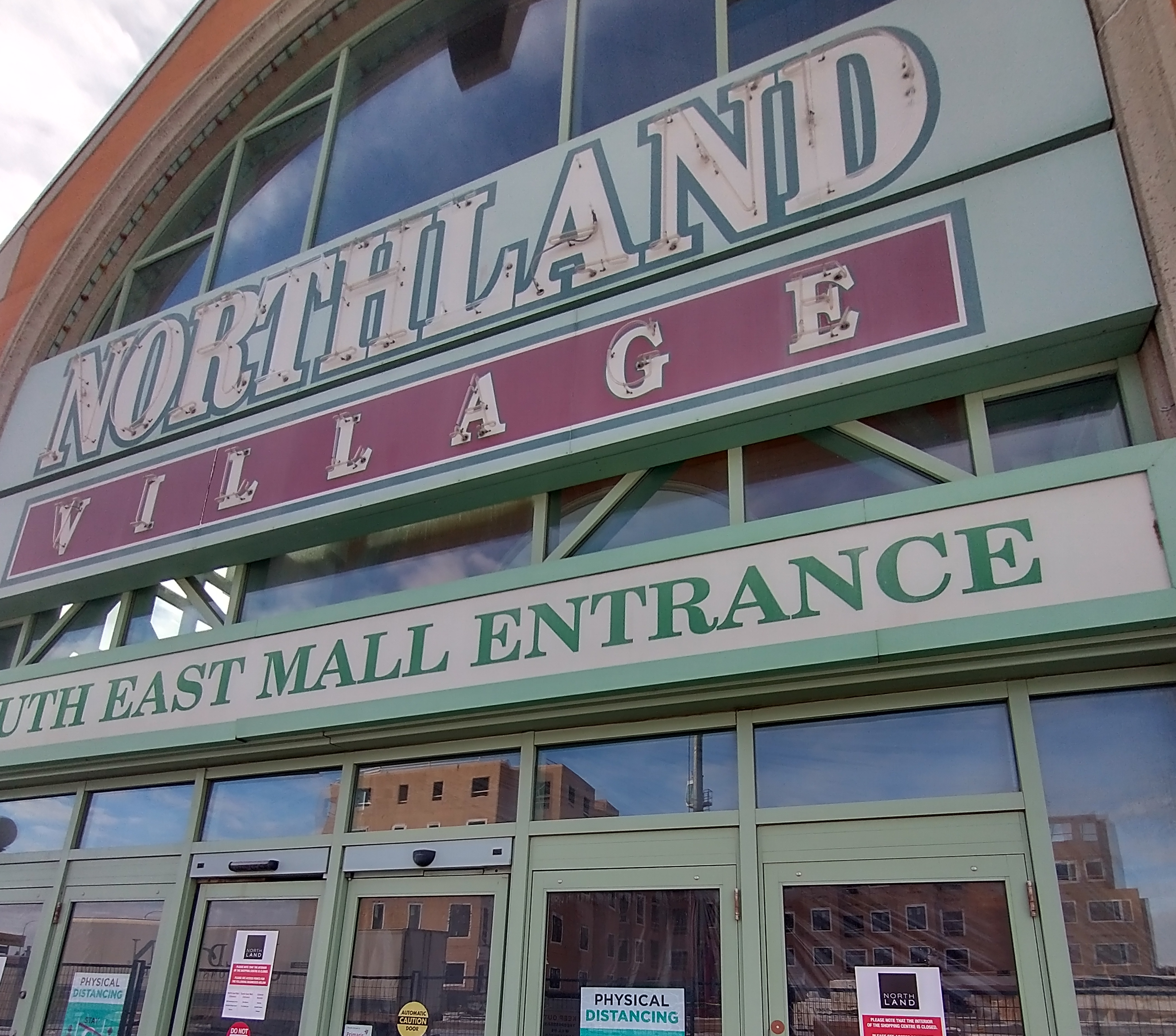
- The former southeast entrance to the mall, December 2022
- Location: Calgary, Alberta, Canada
- Address: 5111 Northland Dr NW
- Opened: 1971
- Closed: 2021 (original indoor mall)
- Demolished: 2022 (original indoor mall)
- Previous names: Northland Village Mall (1971–2024)
- Manager: Primaris REIT
- Num. of stores: 81 (prior to 2021)
- Num. of anchor tenants: 3
- Floor area: 380,000 square feet (35,000 m^{2})
- Floors: 2
- Website: https://www.northlandyyc.com/

Northland (formerly Northland Village Mall) is an open-air shopping centre and former mall located in northwest Calgary, Alberta. The mall opened in 1971, and was expanded in 2005. The mall began major renovations in 2021, with demolition to redevelop the mall happening throughout 2022 to turn it into an open-air facility. Prior to 2021, Northland Village Mall was a one-level indoor shopping centre (with a small two-level section) with over 60 retail shops and services. In early 2024, the shopping centre was rebranded as simply Northland, to reflect the major changes.

The mall is located at the intersection of Crowchild Trail and Shaganappi Trail, surrounded by the neighbourhoods of Brentwood and Dalhousie.

== Retail stores ==
The mall's three main anchor retailers are currently Best Buy, Winners and Walmart (previously Woolco). It was a regional mall with 510,000 square feet (47,000 m^{2}) of gross leasable area.

Northland underwent renovations in 2003, when it was expanded to accommodate the arrival of new anchor Best Buy and again in 2005, when the bargain cinema was converted into Calgary's first Designer Depot, the Hudson's Bay Co.'s first off-price retail store location in Western Canada.

== History ==
Until 1999, Eaton's was the primary anchor on the north side of mall. This was replaced with a Future Shop until that brand became defunct in 2015. For several years, the Future Shop operated at the same time as the mall's Best Buy; despite sharing owners and carrying similar goods, the two stores were located down a short corridor from one another. Part of the former Eaton's footprint was also used to add a small second floor area with a Winners and Fabricland.

The mall is the recipient of a 1998 MAXI Award for their program to help impoverished adults.

In November 2021, the interior of the mall was mostly closed in preparation for a redevelopment of the site that saw the shopping centre "de-malled" and become an open-air complex, with major reconstruction beginning in January 2022. In mid-January 2022, filming for the TV series The Last of Us took place at the mall, with the shuttered corridors standing in for a post-apocalyptic setting.

In May 2023, the demolition of the mall began as part of the ongoing redevelopment, though some retailers such as Walmart and Best Buy remained in operation.
