= Dalhousie, Calgary =

Dalhousie
- Neighbourhood
- Location of Dalhousie in Calgary
- Coordinates: 51°06′35″N 114°09′32″W
- Country: Canada
- Province: Alberta
- City: Calgary
- Quadrant: NW
- Ward: 7
- Established: 1967

Government
  - Mayor: Jeromy Farkas
  - Administrative body: Calgary City Council
  - Councillor: Myke Atkinson (Independent)

Area
  - Total: 3.34 km^{2} (1.29 sq mi)
- Elevation: 1,135 m (3,724 ft)

Population (2006)
  - Total: 9,098
  - Density: 2,724/km^{2} (7,060/sq mi)
  - Average Income: $59,298
- Website: Dalhousie Community Association

Dalhousie is a neighbourhood in the northwest area of Calgary. It is bounded to the north by John Laurie Boulevard, to the east by Shaganappi Trail, to the south by Crowchild Trail and to the west by Sarcee Trail.

Dalhousie was established in 1967 and was named for George Ramsay, 9th Earl of Dalhousie. It is represented in the Calgary City Council by the Ward 7 councillor.

The community is served by the Dalhousie station of the C-Train LRT system.

== Demographics ==
In the City of Calgary's 2012 municipal census, Dalhousie had a population of 9,085 living in 3,739 dwellings, a 1.9% increase from its 2011 population of 8,917. With a land area of 3.3 km^{2} (1.3 sq mi), it had a population density of 2,750/km^{2} (7,130/sq mi) in 2012.

Residents in this community had a median household income of $59,298 in 2000, and there were 17.1% low income residents living in the neighbourhood. As of 2000, 24.1% of the residents were immigrants. A proportion of 25.1% of the buildings were condominiums or apartments, and 26.8% were used for renting.

== Education ==
As of 2006, there are four schools in the district: Dalhousie Elementary School, West Dalhousie Elementary School and H.D. Cartwright Junior High School in the public system, and St. Dominic in the Separate (Catholic) system. Students in Dalhousie continue on to Sir Winston Churchill High School in the public system, or St. Francis High School in the Catholic system.

== See also ==
- List of neighbourhoods in Calgary
