= Hamptons, Calgary =

Hamptons
- Neighbourhood
- Location of Hamptons in Calgary
- Coordinates: 51°08′38″N 114°08′56″W
- Country: Canada
- Province: Alberta
- City: Calgary
- Quadrant: NW
- Ward: 2
- Established: 1989
- Annexed: 1976

Government
  - Mayor: Jeromy Farkas
  - Administrative body: Calgary City Council
  - Councillor: Jennifer Wyness (Independent)

Area
  - Total: 2.5 km^{2} (0.97 sq mi)
- Elevation: 1,245 m (4,085 ft)

Population (2006)
  - Total: 8,175
  - Average Income: $109,463
- Website: Hamptons Community Association

Hamptons is a residential neighbourhood in the northwest quadrant of Calgary, Alberta. It is located close to the northern edge of the city, and is bounded to the north by Stoney Trail, to the east by Shaganappi Trail, to the south by Country Hills Boulevard, and to the west by Sarcee Trail.

The land was annexed in two stages, the southern area in 1976 and the northern one in 1989. The Hamptons was established as a neighbourhood in 1990. It is represented in the Calgary City Council by the Ward 2 councillor.

The community is home to an Olympic size hockey rink and an annual Stampede breakfast.

== Demographics ==
In the City of Calgary's 2012 municipal census, Hamptons had a population of 7,905 living in 2,471 dwellings, a 0.8% increase from its 2011 population of 7,843. With a land area of 3.5 km^{2} (1.4 sq mi), it had a population density of 2,260/km^{2} (5,850/sq mi) in 2012.

Residents in this neighbourhood had a median household income of $125,042 in 2005, and 5.6% of its residents were within low income households. Also as of 2005, 44.9% of the residents were immigrants while, in 2006, 84.6% of occupied private dwellings were single detached homes, and only 2.3% of all occupied private dwellings were rented.

== Education ==
The community is served by the Hamptons School (K-6). Students then move onto Tom Baines School (7-9) For Junior High. For High School Students go to Sir Winston Churchill High School (10-12).

== Homeowners association ==
The Hamptons Homeowners Association maintains a community website with access to information on events, recreation, and other information; as well as an archive of the "Your Hamptons" newsletter in PDF format.

== See also ==
- List of neighbourhoods in Calgary
