= Northland Mall (Appleton, Wisconsin) =

Mall in Appleton, Wisconsin

- Location: Appleton, Wisconsin, United States
- Coordinates: 44.28868°N 88.4203°W
- Opened: 1969
- Developer: Melvin Simon & Associates
- Manager: Aetna Realty
- Owner: Aetna Realty
- Num. of stores: 30
- Num. of anchor tenants: 3 (2 open, 1 vacant)
- Floor area: 189,125 square feet (17,570.3 m^{2})
- Floors: 1
- Public transit: Valley Transit

Northland Mall is a shopping mall in Appleton, Wisconsin. It features Festival Foods and Kohl's as anchor stores, with one vacancy previously occupied by Shopko. The mall is owned by Aetna Realty.

== History ==
Northland Plaza opened in 1969, one of the first retail developments in Appleton. Original tenants included W. T. Grant and a Kroger supermarket. Melvin Simon & Associates, now known as Simon Property Group, developed the original complex. The center struggled with vacancy within its initial years; by 1971, Kroger, SupeRx Drugs, Hallmark, King's Food Host restaurant, and a dry cleaners had all closed, leaving only W. T. Grant, So-Fro Fabrics, and Kindy Optical. Despite these vacancies, Shopko opened a store at the center in March 1971. The 60,000-square-foot (5,600 m^{2}) store was the second in the Fox Cities. Although W. T. Grant closed in 1976, several new stores opened within the plaza within the following year, including RadioShack. The W. T. Grant store became Lathrop Furniture in 1979.

In 1983, Kohl's replaced the Lathrop Furniture store. The same year, an enclosed mall was built, linking Kohl's to Shopko, and the property was renamed Northland Mall. Kohl's expanded into the mall concourse in 1995.

On June 23, 2019, the Shopko location closed as part of the mass closure of all Shopko locations.
