= Varsity, Calgary =

Varsity
- Neighbourhood
- Location of Varsity in Calgary
- Coordinates: 51°05′32″N 114°08′51″W
- Country: Canada
- Province: Alberta
- City: Calgary
- Quadrant: NW
- Ward: 1
- Developed: 1963

Government
  - Mayor: Jeromy Farkas
  - Administrative body: Calgary City Council
  - Councillor: Kim Tyers (Communities First)

Area
  - Total: 6.2 km^{2} (2.4 sq mi)
- Elevation: 1,110 m (3,640 ft)

Population (2006)
  - Total: 12,158
  - Average Income: $58,603
- Website: Varsity Community Association

Varsity is an established neighbourhood in the Northwest quadrant of Calgary, Alberta. It was developed in the 1960s and early 1970s on a plateau to the north of the Bow River valley, and is primarily composed of Single-detached dwellings on wide lots. The neighbourhood comprises three major areas: Varsity Acres, Varsity Village, and Varsity Estates. Varsity is bounded on the north and east by Crowchild Trail, on the west by the Bow River, and on the south by 32nd Avenue NW. It borders the neighbourhoods of Silver Springs and Bowness on the west side, and both Montgomery and the University of Calgary campus on the south side. The easternmost portion of Varsity contains the University of Calgary Research Park.

== History ==
Varsity was originally developed as 3 separate neighborhoods: Varsity Acres, Varsity Estates, and Varsity Village. At an unknown date they were merged into 1 community.

== Developments ==
=== Varsity Acres ===
Varsity Acres is the oldest part of Varsity. It was developed in the 1960s with a street pattern of folded grids, rear lanes, and the occasional cul-de-sac. The original access from the east was via Varsity Drive where it intersected at Crowchild Trail at Brisebois Drive. This access was closed in the early 1970s in favour of a connection to 40th Avenue NW at the same intersection.

=== Varsity Village ===
Varsity Village was developed by Carma Developers LP in the late 1960s and early 1970s. Unique in Calgary, the planning of Varsity Village was based on the Radburn Plan by Clarence Stein and Henry Wright. The Radburn Plan adapted the ideas of the English Garden City to the increasingly motorised American context, developing a street hierarchy that segregated through traffic from local traffic and automotive traffic from pedestrian traffic. Like at Radburn, the developers of Varsity Village used as many culs-de-sac as possible, and forwent rear lanes in favour of pedestrian pathways that connected to parks behind the houses (and not adjacent to streets). The developers' intent was to create a park-like setting for users of the rear walkways, and in many places in the neighbourhood where tall private fences have not been built, this intent has been maintained.

This pattern of development was also used in Calgary in the neighbourhood of Braeside.

Market Mall, one of Calgary's major regional interior malls is located in Varsity Village, along with most of the neighbourhood's multi-family dwellings.

=== Varsity Estates ===
Varsity Estates is Varsity's most upscale area. It is almost entirely made up of single-detached dwellings without rear lanes, and much of it lies adjacent to the Bowmont Natural Park or the Silver Springs Golf and Country Club.

Given that the C-Train has been extended to Varsity adjacent to Varsity Estates, the city has proposed a transit-oriented development in the area.

== Demographics ==
In the City of Calgary's 2012 municipal census, Varsity had a population of 12,200 living in 5,547 dwellings, a 1.5% increase from its 2011 population of 12,021. With a land area of 6.8 km^{2} (2.6 sq mi), it had a population density of 1,794/km^{2} (4,650/sq mi) in 2012.

Residents in this community had a median household income of $90,000 in 2020, and there were 12% low income residents living in the neighbourhood. As of 2021, 28% of the residents were immigrants. A proportion of 39% of the buildings were condominiums or apartments, and 38% of the housing was used for renting.

== Crime ==
Crime Data
Year	Crime Rate (/100 pop.)
2018	2.6
2019	2.5
2020	2.3
2021	2.1
2022	3.4
2023	1.8

== Education ==
The community is served by F. E. Osborne Junior High School, Jerry Potts Elementary School, Marion Carson Elementary and Varsity Acres Bilingual Elementary public schools, as well a by St. Vincent de Paul Elementary & Junior High (Catholic).

== See also ==
- Calgary Varsity, the local provincial electoral district
- List of neighbourhoods in Calgary
- Pedestrian-oriented development
