= Sage Hill, Calgary =

Sage Hill
- Neighbourhood
- Location of Nolan Hill in Alberta
- Coordinates: 51°10′30″N 114°08′42″W
- Country: Canada
- Province: Alberta
- City: Calgary
- Quadrant: NW
- Ward: 2

Government
  - Mayor: Jeromy Farkas
  - Administrative body: Calgary City Council
  - Councillor: Jennifer Wyness (Independent)

Population (2012)
  - Total: 2,189
- Time zone: UTC-7 (Mountain)
- Area code: 403 587

Sage Hill is a residential neighbourhood in the northwest quadrant of Calgary, Alberta, Canada. Located near the north edge of the city, it is bounded by the Nolan Hill community across Shaganappi Trail to the west, 144 Avenue N.W. to the north, the Evanston community to the east, and the Kincora community across 128 Avenue N.W. to the south. It is one of five communities in the Symons Valley area. West Nose Creek flows through the eastern part of Sage Hill.

Sage Hill is in Calgary City Council's Ward 2.

== Demographics ==
In the City of Calgary's 2012 municipal census, Sage Hill had a population of 2,189 living in 992 dwellings, a 53.6% increase from its 2011 population of 1,425. With a land area of 3.8 km^{2} (1.5 sq mi), it had a population density of 576/km^{2} (1,492/sq mi) in 2012.

== See also ==
- List of neighbourhoods in Calgary
