= Queen's Gaels football =

Canadian football team

Queen's Gaels
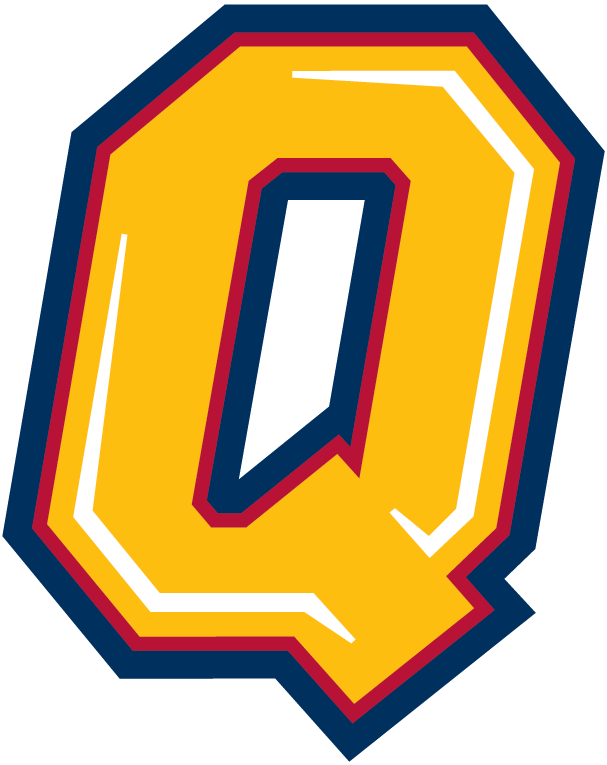
- Queen's Gaels logo
- First season: 1882; 144 years ago
- Athletic director: Linda Melnick (interim)
- Head coach: Steve Snyder; 7th year, 38–16 (.704)
- Other staff: Ryan Bechmanis (DC); Charlie Taggart (SC); Matt Nesbitt(OC)
- Home stadium: Richardson Memorial Stadium
- Year built: 1971; refurbished 2016
- Stadium capacity: 8,500
- Stadium surface: Artificial Turf
- Location: Kingston, Ontario
- League: U Sports
- Conference: OUA (2001-present)
- Past associations: ORFU (1883-1897); CIRFU (1898-1954); O-QAA (1955-1970); OUAA (1971-1973); OQIFC (1974-2000)
- All-time record: 504–380–17 (.569)
- Postseason record: –

Titles
- Grey Cups: 3 (1922, 1923, 1924)
- Vanier Cups: 4 (1968, 1978, 1992, 2009)
- Mitchell Bowls: 1 (2009)
- Churchill Bowls: 3 (1968, 1983, 1992)
- Atlantic Bowls: 1 (1978)
- Yates Cups: 25 (1900, 1904, 1922, 1923, 1924, 1925, 1927, 1929, 1930, 1934, 1935, 1937, 1955, 1956, 1961, 1963, 1964, 1966, 1968, 1970, 1977, 1978, 2009, 2025)
- Dunsmore Cups: 7 (1981, 1983, 1984, 1989, 1991, 1992, 1997)
- Hec Crighton winners: 3 (Larry Mohr, Tommy Denison x2)

Current uniform
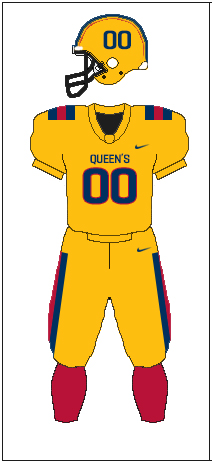
- Colours: Gold, Blue, and Red
- Fight song: Oil Thigh
- Mascot: Boo-Hoo
- Outfitter: Nike
- Website: gogaelsgo.com/football

The Queen's Gaels football team represents Queen's University in the sport of Canadian football. The Gaels compete at the U Sports football level, within the Ontario University Athletics (OUA) conference. Queen's began competing in intercollegiate football in 1882. The Gaels play in the Richardson Memorial Stadium in Kingston, which has a capacity of 8,000.

Since its inception, the team has won 24 Yates Cup championships and four Vanier Cup championships, the most recent being in 2009. Unique to only two Canadian universities (the other being University of Toronto Varsity Blues), Queen's has also won three Grey Cup championships (1922, 1923, 1924).

The program has had three Hec Crighton Trophy winners, Larry Mohr and Tommy Denison, who won it twice.

== History ==
=== Early history ===
Queen's has competed continuously since 1882 and the team began organized play in 1883 when the Ontario Rugby Football Union (ORFU) was first founded. The team later went on to win two ORFU championships in 1893 and 1894.

The first organized university football league in Canada, the Canadian Intercollegiate Rugby Football Union (CIRFU), was founded in Kingston in November 1897, with charter members Queen's, McGill University, and the University of Toronto.

As a member of the Canadian Rugby Union (CRU), Queen's qualified to play in the Grey Cup championship, and went on to win three straight in 1922, 1923 and 1924.

Since the beginning of the Vanier Cup championship in 1965, Queen's has won four titles in 1968, 1978, 1992 and 2009.

=== Doug Hargreaves era ===
After playing for Frank Tindall from 1951 to 1955, Doug Hargreaves was picked to be his successor in 1976. Though Tindall left some big shoes to fill Hargreaves fill them and then even eclipsed them with his first 16 seasons making the playoffs, 13 of this seasons making the conference finals, with 8 of those seasons winning the conference title, 3 of those seasons playing in the Vanier cup final, with 2 Vanier cup championships (1978, 1992). After many years of success in 1993 and 1994 they missed the playoffs. Hargreaves decided to retire after the 1994 season. Hargreaves is remembered as a great coach who demanded excellence. The driveway leading up to the stadium is named Hargreaves way after Coach Hargreaves.

=== Bob Howes Era (1995–1999) ===
Originally just named as interim coach in 1995 but after leading the team to the Dunsmore cup (lost 8–3 to the Ottawa Gee Gees) was named head coach. Howes had a plethora of football knowledge as being a 5-time grey cup champion and being a long time assistant to Doug Hargreaves. With a decent staff that saw many holdovers from the Hargreaves era including legendary defensive co-ordinator Bob Mullen. He also had his son Beau Howes as his starting quarterback. The first three years of Howes Campaign were very successful with 3 playoff appearances and two trips to the Dunsmore (1995, 1997) though losing both. They technically have a ceremonial Dunsmore cup victory in 1997 as U Ottawa was found to have ineligible players and their season was forfeited. After the 1997 season though was the end of the success for the Howes staff. The 1998 and 1999 campaigns failed to make the playoffs and thus ended the Howes era.

=== Pat Sheahan era (2000–2018) ===
The team was led by head coach Pat Sheahan from 2000 to 2018. His first year was a difficult one only mustering a 1–7 season. However, in the off-season he recruited a nucleus of talent including future two-time Hec Creighton trophy winner QB Tommy Denison (Qb #7 2001–2003). With Denison leading the way Sheahan would coach them to a Yates cup appearance in 2002. Though he returned Queens back to a respectable team, Sheahan's teams quarterbacked by Denison never were able to win the Vanier. However, his next star quarterback recruit would be and that was Danny Branagan (Qb # 5 2005–2009). With Branagan he led them to their fourth Vanier Cup in 2009. The following year the team endured a difficult 2010 season, finishing 3–5. The team went on to have strong seasons in 2011, 2012, and 2013, with two semi-final finishes and culminating with a Yates Cup berth; unfortunately, they would lose to Western 51–22. The next season after 8 straight playoff campaigns was ended in 2014 when the Gaels failed to make the playoffs. The team finished fourth in the OUA in 2015, being beaten by the Carleton Ravens in the semi-final game. 2016 saw a new stadium built in the place of the old Richardson with a brand new turf field, jumbotron, and 8000 seats. The team finished in seventh place in 2016 with a 3–5 record and missed the playoffs due to a tie-breaker with Guelph, whom they lost to earlier in the season. 2017 was the last playoff appearance in the Sheahan Era which ended ina quarterfinal loss to McMaster.

In 2019, Sheahan was dismissed as head coach after a disappointing 2018 campaign.

=== Steve Snyder era (2019–present) ===
Steve Snyder took over the team in 2019. In 2021, he led the team to a perfect regular season in the OUA and a berth into the Yates Cup Final (which they lost to Western 29–0). Steve was named OUA and U SPORTS Coach of the Year in 2021. Snyder's era has seen a youth movement on the coaching staff, and a revitalized interest in football in the community, hence the back-to-back hosting of the Vanier cup in 2023 and 2024. 3 straight top four finishes has shown the success Snyder has brought to the program with his own personal touch.

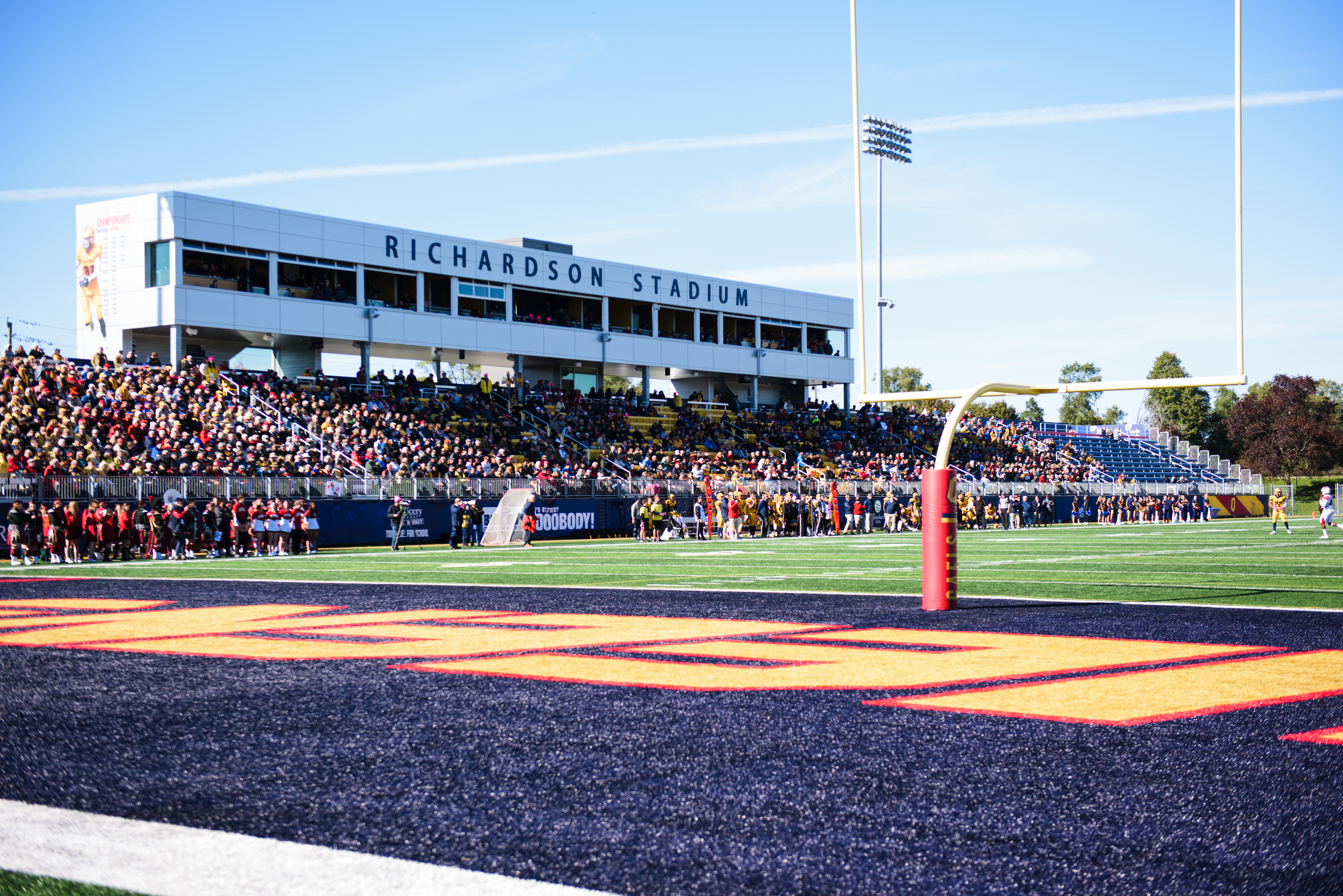
Gaels football at Richardson Memorial Stadium in 2019

== Head coaching history ==
=== Frank Tindall (1939–1975) ===
Frank Tindall began coaching the Queen's Gaels football team in 1939, following his playing career with the Toronto Argonauts. Tindall was known as the primary driving force for the success of the team during this era and was well known around Kingston at this time.

His total records and accomplishments include 196 games (112 wins, 84 losses), with one Vanier Cup (1968), 1 Churchill bowl victory (1968), 2 Churchill Bowl appearances (1970 loss)8 Yates Cups (1955, 1956, 1961, 1963, 1964, 1966, 1968, 1970) and 10 Yates Cup appearances (1960 and 1962 being losses).

=== Doug Hargreaves (1976–1994) ===
Doug Hargreaves took over as head coach in 1976, returning to the team where he previously was a player from 1951 to 1955.

Hargreaves had a total regular season record of 110 wins, 59 losses and 3 tied games, with 2 Vanier Cup championships (1978 and 1992), 3 Vanier Cup Appearances (lost in 1983), 2 Churchill Bowl championships (1983 and 1992), 5 Churchill Bowl Appearances (1979, 1989 and 1991 being losses), 1 Atlantic Bowl championship (1978), 4 Atlantic Bowl Appearances (losses in 1977, 1981 and 1984), 2 Yates Cup championships (1977, 1978), 6 Dunsmore Cup championships (1981, 1983, 1984, 1989, 1991 and 1992), 3 Yates Cup appearances (loss in 1979), 10 Dunsmore Cup appearances (losses in 1980, 1982, 1988 and 1990) and 16 playoff appearances.

=== Bob Howes (1995–1999) ===
Bob Howes was a former CFL player for the Edmonton Eskimos as well as a former Queen's football team player from 1962 to 1965. He began the head coaching position in 1995.

With the Gaels, Howes had a regular season record of 45 total games (playoff and regular season combined), 21 wins to 19 losses, with a playoff record of 2–3 with 2 Dunsmore Cup appearances and 3 OQIFC playoff appearances.

=== Pat Sheahan (2000–2018) ===
Pat Sheahan came on board as the head coach in 2000, after 11 years as coach for the Concordia Stingers, where he also was a former player.

His regular season record had a total of 90 wins and 62 losses, with a playoff record of 12 wins and 12 losses. He led the team to 1 Vanier Cup championship (2009), 1 Mitchell Bowl (2009), 1 Yates Cup (2009), with 3 Yates Cup appearances (losses in 2002 and 2013) and 13 total OUA playoff appearances. In total, he had 176 games as head coach.

=== Steve Snyder (2019–present) ===
Steve Snyder was brought on in 2019 as the head coach, with previous experience coaching the Western Mustangs.

As of 2025, he has a regular season record of 31 wins - 15 losses and a playoff record of 9 wins - 5 losses. He has brought the team to 1 national semi final appearance (2025), 1 Yates Cup Championship (2025) , 3 Yates Cup appearances (2021, 2022) and 5 playoff appearances (2023, and 2024 semifinal finish), with 57 total games coached to date.

== Season-by-season record ==
The following is the record of the Queen's Gaels football team since 1981:

Season	Games	Won	Lost	T	PCT	PF	PA	Standing	Playoffs
1981	7	5	2	0	0.714	NA	NA	2nd in OQIFC	Defeated McGill Redmen in Dunsmore Cup final 26–19; Lost to Acadia Axemen in Atlantic Bowl 40–14
1982	7	6	1	0	0.857	N/A	N/A	2nd in OQUIFC	Lost to Concordia Stingers in Dunsmore Cup 25–15
1983	7	4	1	2	0.714	225	102	1st in OQIFC	Defeated Carleton Ravens in semi-final 32–18; Defeated McGill Redmen in Dunsmore Cup final 36–5; Defeated Toronto Varsity Blues in Churchill Bowl 21–7; Lost to Calgary Dinosaurs in 19th Vanier Cup 31–21
1984	7	5	2	0	0.714	NA	NA	2nd in OQIFC	Defeated McGill Redmen in semi-final 65–29; Defeated Bishop's Gaiters in Dunsmore Cup final 37–35; Lost to Mount Allison Mounties in Atlantic Bowl 34–11
1985	7	7	0	0	1.000	N/A	N/A	1st in OQUIFC	Lost to Concordia Stingers in semi-final
1986	7	4	3	0	0.571	N/a	N/a	3rd in OQUIFC	Lost to Bishop's Gaiters in semi-final
1987	7	3	4	0	0.429	141	161	3rd in OQUIFC	Lost to McGill Redmen in semi-final 27–24
1988	7	5	2	0	0.714	160	103	2nd in OQUIFC	Defeated Ottawa Gee-Gees in semi-final 16–13; Lost to Bishop's Gaiters in Dunsmore Cup final 16–7
1989	7	7	0	0	1.000	217	73	1st in OQUIFC	Defeated McGill Redmen in semi-final 33–17; Defeated Ottawa Gee-Gees in Dunsmore Cup final 39–18; Lost to Saskatchewan Huskies in Churchill Bowl 39–10
1990	7	4	2	1	0.643	146	81	3rd in OQIFC	Defeated Concordia Stingers in semi-final 37–15; Lost to Bishop's Gaiters in Dunsmore Cup final 20–9
1991	7	5	2	0	0.714	278	142	2nd in OQIFC	Defeated Concordia Stingers in semi-final 25–23; Defeated Bishop's Gaiters in Dunsmore Cup final 34–31; Lost to Wilfrid Laurier Golden Hawks in Churchill Bowl 42–22
1992	7	6	1	0	0.857	225	102	2nd in OQIFC	Defeated McGill Redmen in semi-final 24–21; Defeated Bishop's Gaiters in Dunsmore Cup final 32–6; Defeated Guelph Gryphons in Churchill Bowl 23–16; Defeated Saint Mary's Huskies in 28th Vanier Cup 31–0
1993	7	2	5	0	0.286	122	188	6th in OQIFC	Did not qualify
1994	7	1	6	0	0.143	136	188	6th in OQIFC	Did not qualify
1995	8	5	3	0	0.625	131	91	2nd in OQIFC	Defeated Bishop's Gaiters in semi-final 25–0; Lost to Ottawa Gee-Gees in Dunsmore Cup final 8–3
1996	8	5	3	0	0.625	137	142	3rd in OQIFC	Lost to McGill Redmen in semi-final 19–9
1997	8	6	2	0	0.750	183	106	1st in OQIFC	Defeated McGill Redmen in semi-final 10–7; Lost to Ottawa Gee-Gees in Dunsmore Cup final 21–7
1998	8	3	5	0	0.375	208	170	6th in OQIFC	Did not qualify
1999	8	2	6	0	0.250	179	189	5th in OQIFC	Did not qualify
2000	8	1	7	0	0.125	114	312	6th in OQIFC	Did not qualify
2001	8	5	3	0	0.625	201	171	4th in OUA	Defeated Wilfrid Laurier Golden Hawks in quarter-final 29–27; Lost to Ottawa Gee-Gees in semi-final 47–12
2002	8	7	1	0	0.875	271	102	2nd in OUA	Defeated Waterloo Warriors in quarter-final 51–14; Defeated Western Mustangs in semi-final 55–20; Lost to McMaster Marauders in Yates Cup final 33–17
2003	8	7	1	0	0.875	361	134	2nd in OUA	Defeated York Lions in quarter-final 27–6; Lost to Wilfrid Laurier Golden Hawks in semi-final 36–33
2004	8	2	6	0	0.250	211	195	9th in OUA	Did not qualify
2005	8	3	5	0	0.375	198	223	7th in OUA	Did not qualify
2006	8	4	4	0	0.500	177	147	6th in OUA	Defeated McMaster Marauders in quarter-final 25–19; Lost to Ottawa Gee-Gees in semi-final 23–10
2007	8	6	2	0	0.750	229	117	3rd in OUA	Lost to Western Mustangs in quarter-final 27–19
2008	8	8	0	0	1.000	374	116	1st in OUA	Lost to Ottawa Gee-Gees in semi-final 23–13
2009	8	7	1	0	0.875	272	149	1st in OUA	Defeated McMaster Marauders in semi-final 32–6; Defeated Western Mustangs in Yates Cup final 43–39; Defeated Laval Rouge et Or in Mitchell Bowl 33–30; Defeated Calgary Dinos in 45th Vanier Cup 33–31
2010	8	3	5	0	0.375	249	183	6th in OUA	Lost to McMaster Marauders in quarter-final 40–19
2011	8	6	2	0	0.750	259	103	3rd in OUA	Defeated Wilfrid Laurier Golden Hawks in quarter-final 14–10; Lost to McMaster Marauders in semi-final 40–13
2012	8	6	2	0	0.750	247	145	3rd in OUA	Defeated Wilfrid Laurier Golden Hawks in quarter-final 34–0; Lost to Guelph Gryphons in semi-final 30–13
2013	8	7	1	0	0.875	354	208	2nd in OUA	Defeated Guelph Gryphons in semi-final 34–17; Lost to Western Mustangs in Yates Cup final 51–22
2014	8	3	5	0	0.375	203	227	8th in OUA	Did not qualify
2015	8	5	3	0	0.625	242	251	4th in OUA	Lost to Carleton Ravens in quarter-final 39–8
2016	8	3	5	0	0.375	236	210	7th in OUA	Did not qualify
2017	8	4	4	0	0.500	290	223	6th in OUA	Lost to McMaster Marauders in quarter-final 12–9
2018	8	3	5	0	0.375	244	226	8th in OUA	Did not qualify
2019	8	3	5	0	0.375	177	224	8th in OUA	Did not qualify
2020	Season cancelled due to COVID-19 pandemic								
2021	6	6	0	0	1.000	172	44	1st in OUA East	Defeated Carleton Ravens in quarter-final 41–14; Defeated Ottawa Gee-Gees in semi-final 32–15; Lost to Western Mustangs in Yates Cup final 29–0
2022	8	7	1	0	0.875	300	127	2nd in OUA	Defeated Toronto Varsity Blues in quarter-final 41–13; Defeated Ottawa Gee-Gees in semi-final 35–13; Lost to Western Mustangs in Yates Cup final 44–16
2023	8	5	3	0	0.625	242	122	4th in OUA	Defeated Ottawa Gee-Gees in quarter-final 15–10; Lost to Western Mustangs in semi-final 47–20
2024	8	5	3	0	0.625	261	201	5th in OUA	Defeated Windsor Lancers in quarter-final 22–19; Lost to Wilfrid Laurier Golden Hawks in semi-final 29–21
2025	8	5	3	0	0.625	326	123	4th in OUA	Defeated McMaster Marauders in quarter-final 46-10; Defeated Windsor Lancers in semi-final 36-25; Defeated Wilfrid Laurier Golden Hawks in Yates Cup final 30–27; Lost to Saskatchewan Huskies in Mitchell Bowl 22-11
2026	8	7	1	0	0.875	303	184	1st in OUA	Defeated Ottawa Gee-Gees in semi-final 45-27; Lost to Western Mustangs in Yates Cup final 36–27

== National award winners ==
- Hec Crighton Trophy: Larry Mohr (1985), Tommy Denison (2002, 2003)
- J. P. Metras Trophy: Dick Bakker (1977), Jim Muller (1979), Mike Schad (1985)
- Presidents' Trophy: Thaine Carter (2008)
- Peter Gorman Trophy: Gord Goodwin (1977)
- Russ Jackson Award: Charlie Galunic (1986), Jock Climie (1989), Curt McLellan (2003), Curtis Carmichael (2015)
- Frank Tindall Trophy: Doug Hargreaves (1983), Pat Sheahan (2008), Steve Snyder (2021)

== Queen's Gaels in the CFL ==
As of the start of the 2026 CFL season, seven former Gaels players are on CFL teams' rosters:

- Peter Adjey, Ottawa Redblacks
- Silas Hubert, Edmonton Elks
- Cameron Lawson, Winnipeg Blue Bombers
- Ashton Miller-Melancon, Calgary Stampeders
- Olivier Muembi, Edmonton Elks
- Darien Newell, Edmonton Elks
- Justin Pace, Edmonton Elks

=== Notable team alumni ===
One notable Queen's player was Carl Voss, who was both an excellent football and hockey player. While attending university, he played four football seasons (1924–1927), which included the 12th Grey Cup in 1924. Voss has his name engraved on the Grey Cup for this season. Voss also scored the Stanley Cup winning goal for the Chicago Blackhawks in the 1938 Stanley Cup Finals. He was inducted into the Hockey Hall of Fame. Along with Lionel Conacher, Voss is one of only two players to have their name engraved on both the Stanley Cup and the Grey Cup.

Chris Patrician, player on the 2011-14 Queen's football teams, was named to Canada's 2022 Olympic team.
