= Frank Tindall =

Football player and coach

Profile
- Position: Lineman

Personal information
- Born: October 16, 1909; Solvay, New York, U.S.
- Died: October 5, 1993 (aged 83); Kingston, Ontario, Canada

Career information
- College: Syracuse

Career history

Playing
- 1933–1934: Toronto Argonauts

Coaching
- 1933: University of Toronto (assistant)
- 1933–1934: Toronto Argonauts (line coach)
- 1939–1975: Queen's

Awards and highlights
- Grey Cup champion (1933); Vanier Cup champion (1968)

Head coaching record
- Career: 111–84–2 (.569)

Francis Gerald Tindall (October 16, 1909 – October 5, 1993) was an American-born Canadian football player and coach who was head coach of the Queen's Golden Gaels for 29 years. The Frank Tindall Trophy, presented to the U Sports Football Coach of the Year, is named in his honour.

== Playing ==
A native of Solvay, New York, Tindall played for the Syracuse Orange football and basketball team. He recovered three fumbles in the 1932 season opener against Clarkson, including one that set up the game–winning touchdown. In 1933, he joined the Toronto Argonauts as a player and assistant coach. He was a member of the team that won the 21st Grey Cup. He was one of many players who departed the team following the 1934 season.

== Coaching ==
During the 1933 season, Tindall was an assistant coach at the University of Toronto. He was head coach of Queen's University in 1939, but the school dropped football during World War II. Tindall returned to New York, where he worked as a deputy county clerk. In 1948, he returned to Queen's as football and basketball coach. He retired in 1953, but a student petition persuaded him to return. In 1955, he was granted a unprecedented lifetime contract. Over 29 seasons, Tindall compiled a 111-84-2 record and winning eight provincial (Yates Cup) titles and 1 national championship (Vanier Cup). He developed a number of professional players, including Ron Stewart, Stu Lang, Gary Schreider, Jim Young, Bob Howes, Tip Logan, Bayne Norrie, and Lou Bruce. In 1985, he was inducted into the Canadian Football Hall of Fame.

== Death ==
Tindall died on October 5, 1993 as a result of head injuries suffered in a fall two weeks prior.
