= List of Canadian football stadiums =

The following is a partial list of Canadian football stadiums, ordered by permanent capacity. Most of Canada's football stadiums with permanent seating capacities over 3,000 are listed here. Note that not all stadiums are exclusively used for Canadian football; several are also used for association football (soccer).

== Current stadiums ==
=== Over 10,000 ===
Image	Stadium	Capacity	City	Province	Home team	Record attendance
	Commonwealth Stadium	56,400	Edmonton	Alberta	Edmonton Elks, Edmonton Wildcats	63,317
	Olympic Stadium	56,040	Montreal	Quebec		69,093
	BC Place	54,500	Vancouver	British Columbia	BC Lions	59,621
	McMahon Stadium	35,650	Calgary	Alberta	Calgary Stampeders, Calgary Dinos, Calgary Colts	50,035
	Princess Auto Stadium	32,343	Winnipeg	Manitoba	Winnipeg Blue Bombers, Manitoba Bisons, Winnipeg Rifles	36,634
	Mosaic Stadium	33,350	Regina	Saskatchewan	Saskatchewan Roughriders, Regina Rams, Regina Thunder	33,356
	BMO Field	26,000	Toronto	Ontario	Toronto Argonauts	33,421
	TD Place Stadium	24,000	Ottawa	Ontario	Ottawa Redblacks, Panda Game	51,242
	Hamilton Stadium	23,218	Hamilton	Ontario	Hamilton Tiger-Cats	28,808
	Percival Molson Stadium	20,025	Montreal	Quebec	Montreal Alouettes, McGill Redbirds	25,012
	Telus Stadium	12,817	Quebec City	Quebec	Laval Rouge et Or	20,903

=== Under 10,000 ===
Stadium	Capacity	City	Province	Home team
Lamport Stadium	9,600	Toronto	Ontario	Toronto Argonauts (practice facility)
Alumni Stadium	8,500	Guelph	Ontario	Guelph Gryphons
Croix-Bleue Medavie Stadium	8,300	Moncton	New Brunswick	Touchdown Atlantic
Richardson Memorial Stadium	8,000	Kingston	Ontario	Queen's Gaels
Western Alumni Stadium	8,000	London	Ontario	Western Mustangs, London Falcons
Griffiths Stadium	6,171	Saskatoon	Saskatchewan	Saskatchewan Huskies
Westhills Stadium	6,000	Langford	British Columbia	Westshore Rebels
University Stadium a.k.a. Knight-Newbrough Field	6,000	Waterloo	Ontario	Wilfrid Laurier Golden Hawks
Ronald V. Joyce Stadium	6,000	Hamilton	Ontario	McMaster Marauders
Swangard Stadium	5,288	Burnaby	British Columbia	Vancouver Trojans
Clarke Stadium	5,100	Edmonton	Alberta	Edmonton Huskies
CEPSUM Stadium	5,100	Montreal	Quebec	Montreal Carabins
Canada Games Stadium	5,000	Saint John	New Brunswick	UNB Saint John Seawolves
University Stadium	5,000	Winnipeg	Manitoba	Former home of the Manitoba Bisons
Varsity Stadium	5,000	Toronto	Ontario	Toronto Varsity Blues
Centennial Stadium	5,000	Victoria	British Columbia	local teams
SMS Equipment Stadium	5,000	Fort McMurray	Alberta	Fort McMurray Monarchs
Percy Perry Stadium	4,265	Coquitlam	British Columbia	Former home of the Tri-City Bulldogs.
Royal Athletic Park	4,247	Victoria	British Columbia	Victoria Rebels
Concordia Stadium	4,000	Montreal	Quebec	Concordia Stingers
Municipal Stadium	4,000	Sherbrooke	Quebec	local teams
Rotary Stadium	4,000	Abbotsford	British Columbia	Abbotsford Air Force
York Lions Stadium	4,000	North York	Ontario	York Lions
Saskatoon Minor Football Field	3,954	Saskatoon	Saskatchewan	Saskatoon Hilltops
Centennial Park Stadium	3,500	Toronto	Ontario	Serbian White Eagles
Fort William Stadium	3,500	Thunder Bay	Ontario	Marked for Football.
Foote Field	3,500	Edmonton	Alberta	Alberta Golden Bears
Thunderbird Stadium	3,500	Vancouver	British Columbia	UBC Thunderbirds
Berthiaume-Du-Tremblay Stadium	3,500	Laval	Quebec	local teams
Gee-Gees Field	3,400	Ottawa	Ontario	Ottawa Gee-Gees
Université de Sherbrooke Stadium	3,359	Sherbrooke	Quebec	Sherbrooke Vert et Or
Coulter Field	3,000	Sherbrooke	Quebec	Bishop's Gaiters
Esther Shiner Stadium	3,000	Toronto	Ontario	Metro Toronto Wildcats, York Simcoe Storm
MNP Park	3,000	Ottawa	Ontario	Carleton Ravens, Ottawa Sooners
Raymond Field	3,000	Wolfville	Nova Scotia	Acadia Axemen
MacAulay Field	2,500	Sackville	New Brunswick	Mount Allison Mounties
Exhibition Stadium	2,500	Chilliwack	British Columbia	Valley Huskers
Apple Bowl	2,254	Kelowna	British Columbia	Okanagan Sun
Huskies Stadium	2,000	Halifax	Nova Scotia	Saint Mary's Huskies
York Stadium	2,000	Toronto	Ontario	Former home of the York Lions
Hellard Field	2,000	Calgary	Alberta	
University of Windsor Stadium a.k.a. South Campus Stadium	2,000	Windsor	Ontario	Windsor Lancers
Hillside Stadium	2,000	Kamloops	British Columbia	Kamloops Broncos
Birchmount Stadium	2,000	Toronto	Ontario	Toronto Thunder
Raider Field	2,000	Essex	Ontario	Essex Ravens, Essex District High School Red Raiders
Oshawa Civic Stadium	2,000	Oshawa	Ontario	Oshawa Hawkeyes
University of Lethbridge Community Stadium	2,000	Lethbridge	Alberta	
Rocky Stone Field	2,000	Moncton	New Brunswick	Moncton Purple Knights, Moncton Football
Warrior Field	1,700	Waterloo	Ontario	Waterloo Warriors
Barrie Metals Stadium	1,500	Barrie	Ontario	Huronia Stallions
Wayne Gretzky Sports Centre	1,500	Brantford	Ontario	Brantford Bisons
Comet Stadium	1,200	Raymond, Alberta	Alberta	
Terry Fox Field	1,200	Burnaby	British Columbia	Simon Fraser Red Leafs
Leibel Field	1,200	Regina	Saskatchewan	Regina Thunder
StFX Stadium	1,100	Antigonish	Nova Scotia	St. Francis Xavier X-Men
Terry Fox Stadium (Brampton)	1,000	Brampton	Ontario	Brampton Bulldogs
Queens Athletic Field	1,000	Sudbury	Ontario	Sudbury Northerners

== See also ==
- Lists of stadiums
- Rogers Centre, Toronto. Formerly a major venue for Canadian football, baseball-only configuration since 2016
- List of Canadian Football League stadiums
- List of North American stadiums by capacity
