= Mark Surya =

Canadian gridiron football coach (born 1988)

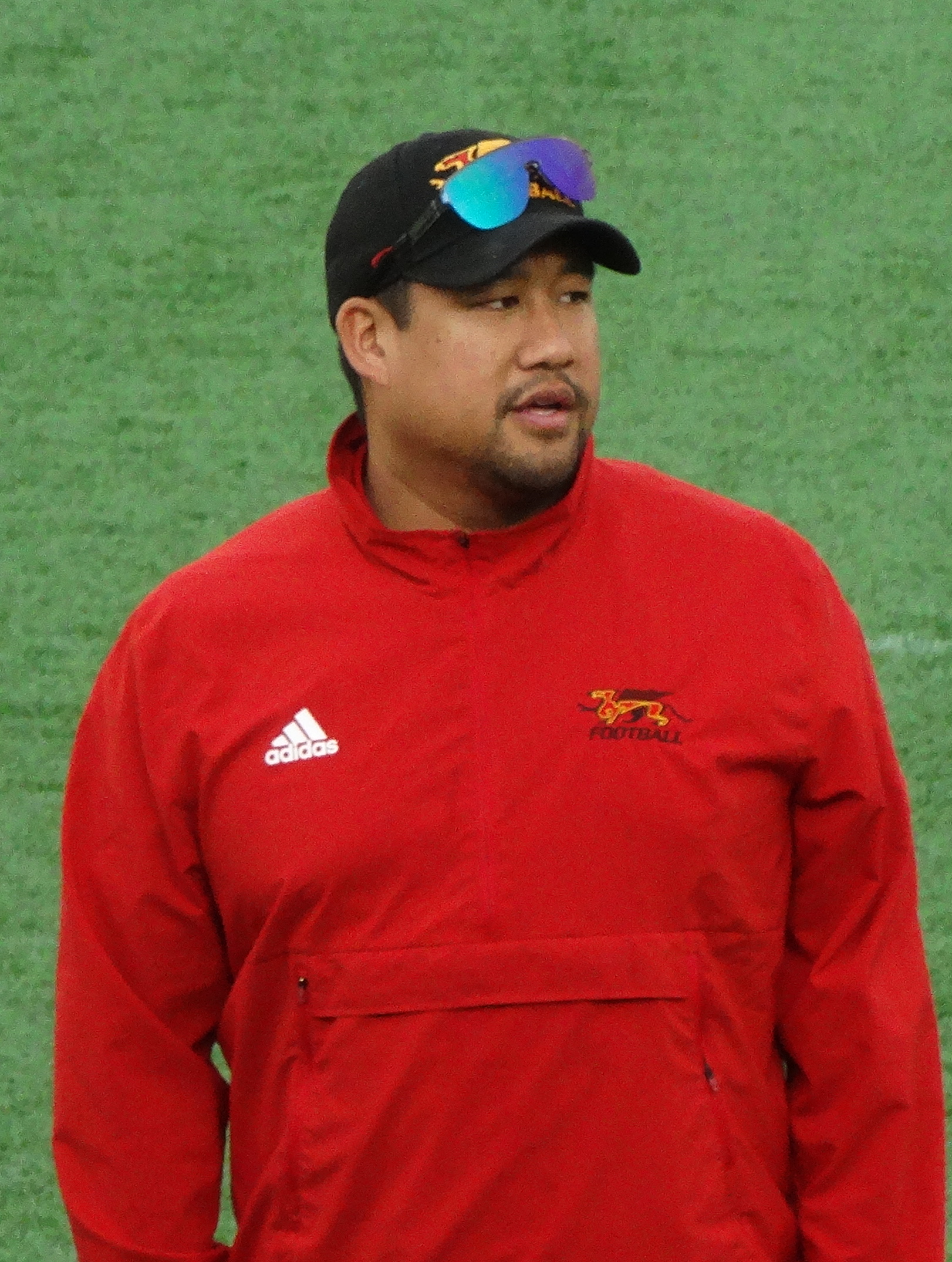
- Surya with the Guelph Gryphons in 2024

Guelph Gryphons
- Title: Head coach

Personal information
- Born: October 16, 1988 (age 38)
- Listed height: 5 ft 11 in (1.80 m)

Career information
- Position: Wide receiver
- High school: Notre Dame Catholic
- University: Queen's; Wilfrid Laurier

Career history
- 2012: Notre Dame Catholic (Offensive coordinator)
- 2013–2014: Wilfrid Laurier Golden Hawks (Receivers coach)
- 2015–2016: Wilfrid Laurier Golden Hawks (Offensive coordinator)
- 2017–2018: Toronto Varsity Blues (Offensive coordinator)
- 2019–2023: Guelph Gryphons (Offensive coordinator)
- 2024–present: Guelph Gryphons (Head coach)

Awards and highlights
- Vanier Cup champion (2009)

Mark Surya (born October 16, 1988) is the head coach for the University of Guelph's football team, the Guelph Gryphons. He won a Vanier Cup in 2009 with the Queen's Gaels as a player.

== University career ==
Surya first played CIS football for the Queen's Gaels from 2007 to 2009 as a receiver. He was part of the 45th Vanier Cup championship team in 2009. He then transferred to Wilfrid Laurier University where he played for the Wilfrid Laurier Golden Hawks from 2010 to 2011.

== Coaching career ==
=== Notre Dame Catholic Secondary ===
Following his university career, Surya was hired as the offensive coordinator for Notre Dame Catholic Secondary School's football team in 2012.

=== Wilfrid Laurier Golden Hawks ===
After a one-year absence from university football, Surya joined the coaching staff of the Wilfrid Laurier Golden Hawks for the 2013 season as the team's receivers coach. After two seasons, he was then promoted to offensive coordinator where he served in that capacity through to the 2016 season when the team finished in second place in the regular season and won the Yates Cup.

=== Toronto Varsity Blues ===
On February 6, 2017, it was announced that Surya had joined the Toronto Varsity Blues as the team's offensive coordinator. He was with the Varsity Blues for two years as the team finished last in the OUA standings each year.

=== Guelph Gryphons ===
Surya was hired by the Guelph Gryphons as their new offensive coordinator for the 2019 season. After five years and four seasons in that role, he was promoted to head coach on December 15, 2023. In his first season as head coach in 2024, the Gryphons finished in third place in the OUA with a 6–2 record and qualified for the playoffs for the first time in three years and hosted a playoff game for the first time in five. Surya won his first playoff game, against the Ottawa Gee-Gees, before losing to the Western Mustangs in the semi-finals.
