= 28th Vanier Cup =

1992 Canadian university football championship

Saint Mary's Huskies	Queen's Golden Gaels
(8–0)	(6–1)
0	31
Head coach: Larry Uteck	Head coach: Doug Hargreaves
	1	2	3	4	Total
Saint Mary's Huskies	0	0	0	0	0
Queen's Golden Gaels	7	14	7	3	31
- Date: November 21, 1992
- Stadium: SkyDome
- Location: Toronto
- Ted Morris Memorial Trophy: Brad Elberg, Queen's
- Bruce Coulter Award: Eric Dell, Queen's
- Attendance: 28,645

The 28th Vanier Cup was played on November 21, 1992, at the SkyDome in Toronto, Ontario, and decided the CIAU football champion for the 1992 season. The Queen's Golden Gaels won their third championship by defeating the Saint Mary's Huskies by a score of 31-0, which was the first, and so far only, shutout in Vanier Cup history. This was the first Vanier Cup in which the Bruce Coulter Award was presented, where Eric Dell of Queen's was the first recipient.

Queen's player Brad Elberg was awarded MVP for the game.

While covering the Vanier Cup with TSN, Paul Romanuk was literally picked up and carried around the field in good-natured celebration by Queen's fans after the game had ended, shortly after interviewing MVP Brad Elberg. He has not covered a Vanier Cup since then.
