= Bishop's Gaiters football =

University Canadian football team

Bishop's Gaiters
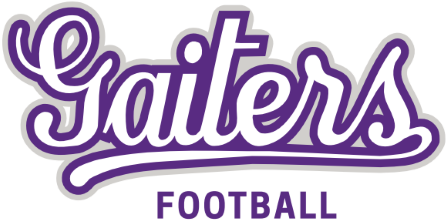
- Bishop's Gaiters logo
- First season: 1884; 142 years ago
- Athletic director: Matt McBrine
- Head coach: Chérif Nicolas; 8th year, 31–38–0 (.449)
- Home stadium: Coulter Field
- Stadium capacity: 2,200
- Stadium surface: FieldTurf
- Location: Lennoxville, Quebec
- League: U Sports
- Conference: RSEQ (2026–present)
- Past associations: QRFU (1884–1885, 1889, 1891); CIRFU (1898–1914, 1919–1933); IIFU (1934–1939, 1946–1952); OSLIAA (1953–1966); CCIFC (1967–1970); QUAA (1971–1973); OQIFC (1974–2000); QUFL/RSEQ (2001–2016); AUS (2017–2025)
- All-time record: –
- Postseason record: –

Titles
- Vanier Cups: 0
- Jewett Trophies: 1, 2024
- Yates Cups: 0
- Dunsmore Cups: 4, 1986, 1988, 1990, 1994
- Hec Crighton winners: 1 Jordan Heather
- Colours: Purple and Silver
- Outfitter: Nike
- Rivals: Sherbrooke Vert et Or; St. Francis Xavier X-Men
- Website: gaiters.ca/football

The Bishop's Gaiters football team represents Bishop's University in Sherbrooke, Quebec in the sport of Canadian football in the Atlantic University Sport conference of U Sports. The Bishop's Gaiters football program can trace its roots back to 1884 and has fielded teams in every decade since then. The program is one of six currently playing U Sports football that has not made a Vanier Cup appearance. However, it is the only program to have appeared in three of the four current conference championship games, with two Yates Cup games played, nine Dunsmore Cup games, and four Loney Bowl games. The program has five conference championships with victories in 1986, 1988, 1990, 1994, and 2024.

== History ==
=== Early years ===
The competitive sports of cricket and rugby-football held annual matches as early as 1873, School (Bishop's College School) vs. Old Boys (University of Bishop's College, later known simply as Bishop's University). The College teams also played against local teams who were able to hold their own against despite the college's small enrolment.

Bishop's first fielded a football team in 1884 and played in the Quebec Rugby Football Union, while also competing in 1885, 1889, and 1891. The team then joined the Canadian Intercollegiate Rugby Football Union in 1898 and competed in the intermediate series until 1955. Upon the dissolution of the Canadian Intercollegiate Athletic Union Central, which had kept the senior program membership to just four schools, Bishop's was a member of the independent Ottawa-St. Lawrence Intercollegiate Athletic Association in 1955, which had programs competing at the senior level. The national Canadian Intercollegiate Athletic Union was formed in 1961 where the Gaiters program was an inaugural member.

=== Bruce Coulter era ===
It wasn't until the early 60's that Principal Ogden Glass gave the university the direction that athletics needed to provide the necessary moral and financial support that ultimately shaped the modern day success of the Gaiters football program. Principal Glass hired Bruce Coulter as director of athletics and head football coach in 1961. This hiring would help Bishop's develop a full-fledged athletic program with teams that could compete on the senior intercollegiate level. Coulter's team won their first championship in 1964 after defeating the Ottawa Gee-Gees 32–12 in the Ottawa-St. Lawrence Athletic Association championship. The Gaiters joined the newly formed Quebec University Athletic Association (QUAA) in 1971 and finished the season with a 6–0 record and were QUAA champions that year. With the introduction of national playoffs and the Vanier Cup in 1965, the Gaiters played in their first semi-final bowl game, the Churchill Bowl, in 1971, but lost to the Alberta Golden Bears.

The QUAA and OUAA merged in 1974, meaning that the Gaiters were now a member of the Ontario-Quebec Intercollegiate Football Conference (OQIFC) East Division. The Gaiters played in the Yates Cup East Finals in 1976 and 1977, but would lose both games. The OQIFC reverted to a two-conference system, rather than two divisions of one conference, in 1980 so the West Division became the Ontario University Athletics Association and the Gaiters remained in the OQIFC. The Gaiters now competed for the Dunsmore Cup conference championship and made their first appearance in 1984, which was a loss to the Queen's Golden Gaels. The team returned two years later and won their first conference championship in the 1986 Dunsmore Cup game by defeating the Carleton Ravens by a score of 38–19. After losing the 1987 conference championship to McGill, the Gaiters won the Dunsmore Cup in 1988 and 1990 with both victories coming against Queen's.

Coulter retired as head football coach after the 1990 season with a then-record 137 wins (his record was 137 wins, 80 losses and 3 ties). In 1991, the football stadium was renamed in his honour and the Gaiters now play on Coulter Field. Coulter was elected to the Canadian Football Hall of Fame in 1997 based on his 29-year head coaching career at Bishop's.

=== Recent years ===
The program remained competitive shortly after Coulter's departure, with four consecutive appearances in the Dunsmore Cup game, with the one victory in 1994 over the McGill Redmen. This was the last win and appearance for the Gaiters in the Dunsmore Cup. Despite their success at the conference level, the Gaiters were winless in five Vanier Cup Semi-final bowl games. After the 1995 season, the Gaiters would not produce a team with a winning record until the 2007 season. The OQIFC was renamed the Quebec Intercollegiate Football Conference (QIFC) in 2001 after all teams were based in Quebec at that point and the QIFC was formally renamed the Quebec University Football League in 2004.

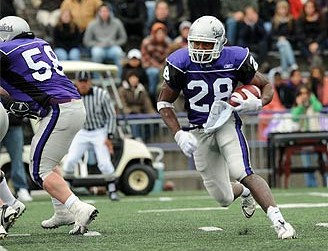
Jamall Lee during a game in 2007

In 2007, running back Jamall Lee and then-head coach Leroy Blugh were honoured as major award winners by the Quebec University Football League. Lee was awarded the Jeff Russel Trophy, given to the league's most outstanding player, while Blugh was named QUFL Coach of the Year. Under Blugh, the program saw a marked improvement, finishing with two winning records and three playoff appearances from 2007 to 2010 as well as having several players drafted into the Canadian Football League. Blugh resigned as head coach following the 2010 season and former athletic director, Tony Addona, coached the team in 2011.

Kevin Mackey was hired as the team's head coach on January 16, 2012. After a winless season in 2012, Mackey and the Gaiters had an outstanding season in 2013 by posting a 6–2 record, which was their most wins in a season since 1993. The team was led by quarterback Jordan Heather who became the first Gaiters player to be awarded the Hec Crighton Trophy after he had a CIS record 3,132 passing yards in a single season. Mackey also won the Frank Tindall Trophy as Coach of the Year in Canadian Interuniversity Sport in 2013. Heather finished his university career in 2013 and Bishop's struggled to adapt as the team finished with a 1–7 record in 2014 and repeated the results in 2015 and 2016. Mackey resigned as the team's head coach on October 30, 2016.

=== Atlantic University Sport ===
On December 15, 2016, the Gaiters announced that their football program would compete in the Atlantic University Sport (AUS) football conference starting in the 2017 season. Being a smaller school, Bishop's felt that they could no longer compete with the Laval and Montreal programs which operated more as private businesses with much larger budgets. The move expanded the AUS to five teams and halted interlock play with the RSEQ. On December 22, 2016, it was announced that Chérif Nicolas had been hired as the 10th head coach in the modern era of the Bishop's football team. The Gaiters finished their first AUS season with a fourth consecutive 1–7 season in 2017. After a winless 2018 season, the Gaiters broke through in the 2019 season by finishing with a 4–4 record and hosting a playoff game for the first time since 1993. After a semi-final win against the Mount Allison Mounties, the team appeared in the Loney Bowl, which was a loss to the Acadia Axemen.

After the cancelled 2020 season, the Gaiters regressed in 2021 and finished 2–4, but still finished in third place and qualified for another Loney Bowl, but lost to the St. Francis Xavier X-Men 25–17. After a second place finish and a semi-final loss to the Mounties in 2022, the Gaiters finished with a 6–2 record in 2023, but lost the Loney Bowl to the X-Men again. In the 2024 season, the Gaiters finished in first place with an 8–0 record and won their first Loney Bowl championship which was their first conference championship in 30 years. In the subsequent Uteck Bowl appearance, the Gaiters lost to the Wilfrid Laurier Golden Hawks 48–24 to end their season. In a competitive 2025 season, the team finished 5–3 and in third place as their season came to and end in the AUS Semi-Final.

=== Return to RSEQ ===
On November 24, 2025, it was announced that the Gaiters would be returning to the RSEQ for the 2026 season. The move was made as of November 30, 2025, due to all teams in the AUS facing financial constraints and travel costs travelling to and from Bishop's.

== Rivalries ==
The Bishop's football team competes for two special trophies: The Mayor's Cup, which is awarded to the winner of one of the annual contests Bishop's and the Sherbrooke Vert et Or, and the Bigg Bowl, which went to the winner of one of the games between Bishop's and the St. Francis Xavier X-Men.

Sherbrooke and Bishop's first met in the 1971 QUAA Championship which was a 49–2 victory for the Gaiters. However, the brewing cross-city rivalry went dormant following the disbanding of Sherbrooke's football program after the 1973 season. The Sherbrooke Vert et Or returned in 2003 and the Mayor's Cup was established in 2006 to be awarded to the winner of a regular season game between the two teams. The Mayor's Cup was played every year until 2016, marking 11 instances of the game. Following the Gaiters move to the AUS conference and the suspension of interlock play between the AUS and RSEQ, Bishop's and Sherbrooke did not meet in the regular season from 2017 to 2025.

The Bigg Bowl trophy was donated by St. FX alumnus Brian McA'Nulty and his wife Mary Adams to honour his grandfather, Reverend H. R. Canon Bigg, a rector of St. Peter's Anglican Church in Sherbrooke from 1915 to 1940 who was also a multi-sport athlete. The trophy was first awarded in 2002 and was seldom played as the Gaiters and X-Men played in separate conferences and interlock play only had the teams play three times from 2002 to 2016. When the Gaiters moved to the same conference, the teams played twice each year with one of the games designated as the Bigg Bowl game.

== Recent season results ==
The following is the record of the Bishop's Gaiters football team since 2000:

Season	Games	Won	Lost	PCT	PF	PA	Standing	Playoffs
2000	8	2	6	0.250	150	196	4th in OQIFC	Lost to Laval Rouge et Or in semi-final 17-14
2001^{[A]}	8	4	4	0.500	107	224	3rd in QIFC	Default win vs. Laval Rouge et Or in semi-final 1-0
2002	8	2	6	0.250	143	270	4th in QIFC	Lost to McGill Redmen in semi-final 44-0
2003	8	2	6	0.250	191	327	5th in QIFC	Did not qualify
2004	8	1	7	0.125	100	243	6th in QUFL	Did not qualify
2005	8	1	7	0.125	131	233	5th in QUFL	Did not qualify
2006	8	1	7	0.125	117	249	6th in QUFL	Did not qualify
2007	8	5	3	0.625	218	176	3rd in QUFL	Lost to Concordia Stingers in semi-final 34-18
2008	8	3	5	0.375	170	255	5th in QUFL	Did not qualify
2009	8	4	4	0.500	171	232	3rd in QUFL	Lost to Montreal Carabins in semi-final 40-15
2010	9	5	4	0.556	186	248	4th in QUFL	Lost to Laval Rouge et Or in semi-final 56-1
2011	9	3	6	0.333	178	277	5th in RSEQ	Did not qualify
2012^{[B]}	9	0	8	0.000	99	243	6th in RSEQ	Did not qualify
2013	8	6	2	0.750	260	242	2nd in RSEQ	Lost to Montreal Carabins in semi-final 51-8
2014	8	1	7	0.125	82	332	5th in RSEQ	Did not qualify
2015	8	1	7	0.125	89	319	6th in RSEQ	Did not qualify
2016	8	1	7	0.125	100	341	6th in RSEQ	Did not qualify
2017	8	1	7	0.125	158	286	5th in AUS	Did not qualify
2018	8	0	8	0.000	91	238	5th in AUS	Did not qualify
2019	8	4	4	0.500	150	210	2nd in AUS	Defeated Mount Allison in semi-final 28-18; Lost to Acadia Axemen in Loney Bowl 31-1
2020	Season cancelled due to COVID-19 pandemic							
2021	6	2	4	0.333	88	135	3rd in AUS	Defeated Mount Allison in semi-final 23-5; Lost to St. Francis Xavier X-Men in Loney Bowl 25-17
2022^{[C]}	7	4	3	0.571	137	105	2nd in AUS	Lost to Mount Allison in semi-final 15-12
2023	8	6	2	0.750	238	110	2nd in AUS	Defeated Mount Allison in semi-final 34-15; Lost to St. Francis Xavier X-Men in Loney Bowl 34-23
2024	8	8	0	1.000	328	128	1st in AUS	Defeated Acadia Axemen in semi-final 59-0; Defeated Saint Mary's Huskies in Loney Bowl 25-22 (3OT); Lost to Wilfrid Laurier Golden Hawks in Uteck Bowl 48-24
2025	8	5	3	0.625	214	153	3rd in AUS	Lost to St. Francis Xavier X-Men in semi-final 26-24
2026	8	1	7	0.125	105	252	6th in RSEQ	Did not qualify

A. Bishop's originally finished in fourth place with a 2–6 record in 2001 and lost the QUFL semi-final playoff game to Laval by a score of 48–12. However, Laval used an ineligible player throughout the entire season and vacated all regular season wins (forfeiting two wins against Bishop's) and all post-season wins (forfeiting the semi-final victory against Bishop's).

B. Bishop's and Concordia both used ineligible players in the same game, so the game was declared "no contest" in a double forfeit. Bishop's also forfeited another win against Concordia and a win against McGill.

C. The September 24, 2022 Bishop's at Saint Mary's game was cancelled due to weather and the October 29, 2022 Saint Mary's at Bishop's game was worth four points with both teams playing seven games in 2022.

== National postseason results ==
Vanier Cup Era (1965-current)
Year	Game	Opponent	Result
1971	Churchill Bowl	Alberta	L 2-53
1986	Churchill Bowl	UBC	L 30-32
1988	Atlantic Bowl	Saint Mary's	L 10-44
1990	Churchill Bowl	Saskatchewan	L 13-41
1994	Churchill Bowl	Western	L 24-41
2024	Uteck Bowl	Wilfrid Laurier	L 24-48

Bishop's is 0–6 in national semi-final games and has not appeared in a Vanier Cup.

== Head coaches ==
Name	Years	Notes
Unknown	1884–1961	
Bruce Coulter	1962–1987	
Ian Breck	1988–2004	
Leroy Blugh	2005–2010	
Tony Addona	2011	
Kevin Mackey	2012–2016	
Chérif Nicolas	2017–present	

== National award winners ==
- Hec Crighton Trophy: Jordan Heather (2013)
- J. P. Metras Trophy: Paul Connery (1994)
- Presidents' Trophy: Leroy Blugh (1988), Ray Bernard (1991), David Stipe (2001)
- Peter Gorman Trophy: Kyle Williams (2004)
- Frank Tindall Trophy: Bruce Coulter (1986), Ian Breck (1992), Kevin Mackey (2013)

== Bishop's Gaiters in the CFL ==
As of the start of the 2026 CFL season, one former Gaiters player is on a CFL team's roster:

- Jake Kelly, Winnipeg Blue Bombers
