= 14th Vanier Cup =

1978 Canadian university football championship

UBC Thunderbirds	Queen's Golden Gaels
(6–2)	(6–0)
3	16
Head coach: Frank Smith	Head coach: Doug Hargreaves
	1	2	3	4	Total
UBC Thunderbirds	0	3	0	0	3
Queen's Golden Gaels	0	3	3	10	16
- Date: November 18, 1978
- Stadium: Varsity Stadium
- Location: Toronto
- Ted Morris Memorial Trophy: Ed Andrew, Queen's
- Attendance: 19,124

The 14th Vanier Cup was played on November 18, 1978, at Varsity Stadium in Toronto, Ontario, and decided the CIAU football champion for the 1978 season. The Queen's Golden Gaels won their second championship by defeating the UBC Thunderbirds by a score of 16–3.
