= Jordan Heather =

Canadian gridiron football player (born 1990)

No. 12
- Position: Quarterback

Personal information
- Born: September 2, 1990 (age 36)
- Listed height: 6 ft 0 in (1.83 m)
- Listed weight: 185 lb (84 kg)

Career information
- High school: Oromocto (NB)
- University: Bishop's
- CFL draft: 2012: undrafted

Awards and highlights
- Hec Crighton Trophy (2013); First-team All-Canadian (2013)

Jordan Heather (born September 2, 1990) is a Canadian former football quarterback. He played CIS football at Bishop's.

== Early life ==
Heather played high school football at Oromocto High School in Oromocto, New Brunswick.

== University career ==
Heather played five seasons of CIS football at Bishop's. He played in nine games (including one playoff game) his final year in 2013, completing 211 of 350 passes for 3,224 yards, 20 touchdowns and 10 interceptions, winning the Hec Crighton Trophy as the best CIS football player that season. His 3,132 passing yards (done in eight regular seasons game) set a CIS record for passing yards in a season. Heather was also the first player in school history to win the Hec Crighton.

== Post-university career ==
Heather has played for the St. Etienne Giants in France, the Calgary Gators of the Alberta Football League, and the North Bay Bulldogs of the Northern Football Conference. Heather was named Most Valuable Player (MVP) for the 2023 Northern Football Conference season.

Heather is a member of the Canadian Armed Forces.
