= Christopher Smith (linebacker) =

Canadian football player (born 1988)

Chris Smith
No. 29
- Position: Linebacker

Personal information
- Born: January 31, 1988 (age 38); Toronto, Ontario
- Listed height: 6 ft 2 in (1.88 m)
- Listed weight: 224 lb (102 kg)

Career information
- University: Queen's
- CFL draft: 2010: 4th round, 28th overall pick

Career history
- 2010: Winnipeg Blue Bombers
- 2011: BC Lions*
- 2011–2012: Toronto Argonauts
- * Offseason or practice squad member only

Awards and highlights
- 45th Vanier Cup Champion
- Stats at CFL.ca

Christopher Smith (born January 31, 1988) is a professional Canadian football linebacker most recently for the Toronto Argonauts of the Canadian Football League. He was drafted 28th overall by the Winnipeg Blue Bombers in the 2010 CFL draft. He played college football for the Queen's Golden Gaels.
