= 20th Vanier Cup =

1984 Canadian university football championship

Mount Allison Mounties	Guelph Gryphons
(N/A)	(4–3)
13	22
Head coach: Steve Bruno	Head coach: John Musselman
	1	2	3	4	Total
Mount Allison Mounties	0	0	0	13	13
Guelph Gryphons	0	0	0	22	22
- Date: November 24, 1984
- Stadium: Varsity Stadium
- Location: Toronto
- Ted Morris Memorial Trophy: Parri Ceci, Guelph
- Attendance: 16,321

The 20th Vanier Cup was played on November 24, 1984, at Varsity Stadium in Toronto, Ontario, and decided the CIAU football champion for the 1984 season. The Guelph Gryphons won their first ever championship by defeating the Mount Allison Mounties by a score of 22-13.
