= 4th Vanier Cup =

1968 Canadian university football championship

Queen's Golden Gaels	Waterloo Lutheran Golden Hawks
(6–1)	(N/A)
42	14
Head coach: Frank Tindall	Head coach: Dave "Tuffy" Knight
	1	2	3	4	Total
Queen's Golden Gaels	7	14	7	14	42
Waterloo Lutheran Golden Hawks	6	0	0	8	14
- Date: November 22, 1968
- Stadium: Varsity Stadium
- Location: Toronto
- Ted Morris Memorial Trophy: Don Bayne, Queen's
- Attendance: 16,051

The 4th Vanier Cup was played on November 22, 1968, at Varsity Stadium in Toronto, Ontario, and decided the CIAU football champion for the 1968 season. The Queen's Golden Gaels won their first ever championship by defeating the Waterloo Lutheran Golden Hawks by a score of 42–14.
