= 45th Vanier Cup =

2009 Canadian university football championship

Calgary Dinos	Queen's Golden Gaels
(7–1)	(7–1)
31	33
Head coach: Blake Nill	Head coach: Pat Sheahan
	1	2	3	4	Total
Calgary Dinos	7	18	0	6	31
Queen's Golden Gaels	7	0	12	14	33
- Date: November 28, 2009
- Stadium: PEPS Stadium
- Location: Quebec City
- Ted Morris Memorial Trophy: Danny Brannagan, Queen's QB
- Bruce Coulter Award: Chris Smith, Queen's LB
- Attendance: 18,628

Broadcasters
- Network: TSN/TSN HD; RDS/RDS HD
- Announcers: (TSN): Rod Black, Duane Forde (RDS): David Arsenault, Denis Casavant, Pierre Vercheval, Mike Sutherland
- Ratings: 706,000

The 45th Vanier Cup was played on November 28, 2009, at PEPS Stadium in Quebec City, Quebec, and decided the CIS Football champion for the 2009 season. In the first Vanier Cup game played in the province of Quebec, the Queen's Golden Gaels came from behind to defeat the Calgary Dinos 33-31. The Gaels, who were down by 18 points at halftime, scored 25 unanswered points in what was the biggest overcome deficit in Vanier Cup history.

Queen's quarterback Danny Brannagan, in his last CIS game, was named the Ted Morris Memorial Trophy as the Most Valuable Player of the game. Queen's linebacker Chris Smith received the Bruce Coulter Award as the Most Outstanding Defensive Player of the game.

== Game summary ==
Calgary Dinos (31) - TDs, Matt Walter, Erik Glavic, Anthony Parker; FGs Aaron Ifield (3); cons., Ifield (2), safety touch.

Queen's Golden Gaels (33) - TDs, Scott Valberg (2), Devan Sheahan, Marty Gordon; FGs Dan Village (1); cons., Village (4); safety touch.

=== Scoring summary ===
First Quarter
CGY - TD Walter 1 run (Ifield convert) (10:34) 7 - 0 CGY
QUE - TD Valberg 9 pass from Brannagan (Village convert) (13:39) 7 - 7
Second Quarter
CGY - FG Ifield 40 (4:07) 10 - 7 CGY
CGY - FG Ifield 12 (7:49) 13 - 7 CGY
CGY - FG Ifield 35 (10:46) 16 - 7 CGY
CGY - TD Glavic 1 run (Ifield convert) (13:47) 23 - 7 CGY
CGY - Safety Team, Allin concedes (14:34) 25 - 7 CGY
Third Quarter
QUE - TD Sheahan 60 pass from Brannagan (Village convert) (1:08) 25 - 14 CGY
QUE - Safety Team, Ifield concedes (2:07) 25 - 16 CGY
QUE - FG Village 12 (5:13) 25 - 19 CGY
Fourth Quarter
QUE - TD Valberg 17 pass from Brannagan (Village convert) (2:23) 26 - 25 QUE
QUE - TD Gordon 15 run (Village convert) (6:26) 33 - 25 QUE
CGY - TD Parker 15 pass from Glavic (2-point convert failed, Glavic Pass incomplete) (8:22) 33 - 31 QUE

=== Notable game facts ===
- The 45th Vanier Cup was watched by 706,000 Canadian viewers, making it the most-watched Vanier Cup in history, surpassing the 2006 game in Saskatoon, which averaged 589,000 viewers.
- Queen's is the first team to win a Vanier Cup in four different decades (national titles in 1968, 1978, 1992 and 2009). Queen's also appeared in the 1983 Vanier Cup game, making it the only school to have competed in a national final in each decade of the championship's existence.

=== Championships ===
The Vanier Cup is played between the champions of the Mitchell Bowl and the Uteck Bowl, the national semi-final games. In 2009, according to the rotating schedule, the Dunsmore Cup Quebec championship team will meet the Ontario conference's Yates Cup champion for the Mitchell Bowl. The winners of the Canada West conference Hardy Trophy travel to the Atlantic conference Loney Bowl champions for the Uteck Bowl.

The Canada West play-offs start with the top four placed teams from the regular season, with the top placed team hosting the fourth place and the second place team hosting the third placed. The winners of those semi-finals then compete for the Hardy Cup championship who then travels to the Atlantic champion for a national semi-final game.

The Quebec play-offs similarly play-off the top four placed teams with the Dunsmore Cup champions moving on to compete for the Mitchell Bowl against the Ontario champions.

The Ontario conference starts out with the top six placed teams from the regular season. The third placed team hosts the sixth place team and the fourth placed team host the team in fifth place. The winners then take on the top two placed teams in the conference semi-finals and the semi-final champions compete for the Yates Cup. The Ontario champions, in 2009, host the Quebec conference champions for the Mitchell Bowl national semi-final game.

The Atlantic conference play-offs the second and third placed teams to determine who plays the first place team at the Loney Bowl for the Jewett Trophy. The Atlantic winner then hosts the Canada West champion to meet in the Uteck Bowl national semi-final.

==== 2009 Playoff bracket ====
Conference Quarter-finals
Guelph Gryphons	18
Western Ontario Mustangs	37
McMaster Marauders	27
Ottawa Gee-Gees	15

Conference Semi-finals
Alberta Golden Bears	13
Calgary Dinos	45
Regina Rams	23
Saskatchewan Huskies	53
Acadia Axemen	30
St. Francis Xavier X-Men	33
Bishop's Gaiters	15
Montreal Carabins	40
Concordia Stingers	1
Laval Rouge et Or	63
Western Ontario Mustangs	26
Laurier Golden Hawks	16
McMaster Marauders	6
Queen's Golden Gaels	32

Conference Championships
Calgary Dinos	39
Saskatchewan Huskies	38
St. Francis Xavier X-Men	22
Saint Mary's Huskies	31
Montreal Carabins	7
Laval Rouge et Or	31
Western Ontario Mustangs	39
Queen's Golden Gaels	43

National Semi-finals
Calgary Dinos	38
Saint Mary's Huskies	14
Laval Rouge et Or	30
Queen's Golden Gaels	33

45th Vanier Cup
Calgary Dinos	31
Queen's Golden Gaels	33
