= Chérif Nicolas =

Canadian gridiron football coach

Bishop's Gaiters
- Title: Head coach

Career information
- University: Montreal; Concordia; Carleton

Career history
- 2009: Cégep du Vieux Montréal (Defensive coordinator)
- 2010–2016: Cégep du Vieux Montréal (Head coach)
- 2017–present: Bishop's Gaiters (Head coach)

Chérif Nicolas is the head coach for Bishop's University's football team, the Bishop's Gaiters.

== University career ==
Nicolas first played CIAU football at linebacker for the Carleton Ravens and was a member of the program from 1996 to 1998. However, after Carleton's football program was discontinued in 1999, he transferred to Concordia University to play for the Concordia Stingers. He then transferred to Montreal to study law and played for two years for the Carabins.

== Coaching career ==
=== Cégep du Vieux Montréal ===
Nicolas was the defensive coordinator for the Cégep du Vieux Montréal Spartiates for one year before serving as head coach for the team from 2010 to 2016 where he recorded 56–26. In 2014, he led the Spartiates to an RSEQ Division 1 Bol D'Or championship. He submitted his resignation on October 31, 2016.

=== Bishop's Gaiters ===
On December 22, 2016, Nicolas was named the head coach of the Bishop's Gaiters, the fifth in program history. His hire coincided with the Gaiters' first season in the Atlantic University Sport (AUS) conference after spending the previous 16 years in the RSEQ. However, the Gaiters finished the 2017 season with a fourth consecutive 1–7 record.

After a winless season in 2018, Nicolas led the Gaiters to a 4–4 record and their first playoff home game since 2013. He won his first playoff game for the Gaiters over the Mount Allison Mounties that year, but lost to the Acadia Axemen in Bishop's first Loney Bowl appearance. He did not coach in 2020 due to the cancellation of the 2020 season.

In a shortened 2021 season, Nicolas and the Gaiters finished in third place and made another appearance in the Loney Bowl, but lost to the St. Francis Xavier X-Men. On January 20, 2022, it was announced that he had signed a contract extension with Bishop's.

In 2022, Nicolas recorded his first winning season as a U Sports head coach as the Gaiters finished 4–3, but he lost the first semi-final playoff game of his career. In the 2023 season, the Gaiters finished in second place with a 6–2 record, but lost in the Loney Bowl to the X-Men.

== Head coaching record ==
Year	Overall	Conference	Standing	Bowl/playoffs
Bishop's Gaiters (AUS) (2017–present)
2017	1-7	1-7	5th	
2018	0-8	0-8	5th	
2019	5-5	4-4	2nd	L Loney
2020	Season canceled due to COVID-19 pandemic			
2021	3-5	2-4	3rd	L Loney
2022	4-4	4-3	2nd	
2023	7-3	6-2	2nd	L Loney
2024	10-1	8-0	1st	W Loney, L Uteck
2025	5-4	5-3	3rd	
Bishop's:	35-37	30-31		
Total:	35-37			
