= Bishop's Gaiters =

Bishop's University athletic teams

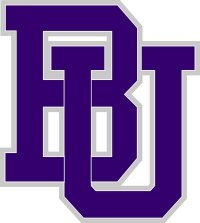
- University: Bishop's University
- Association: U Sports; CUFLA (lacrosse)
- Conference: RSEQ (primary); AUS (football)
- Athletic director: Matt McBrine
- Location: Lennoxville, Quebec
- Varsity teams: 9 (4 men's, 4 women's, 1 co-ed)
- Football stadium: Coulter Field
- Colours: Purple and Silver
- Mascot: The Gaiter
- Fight song: Official: "Alma Mater"; Unofficial: "Drink a Toast!"
- Website: gaiters.ca
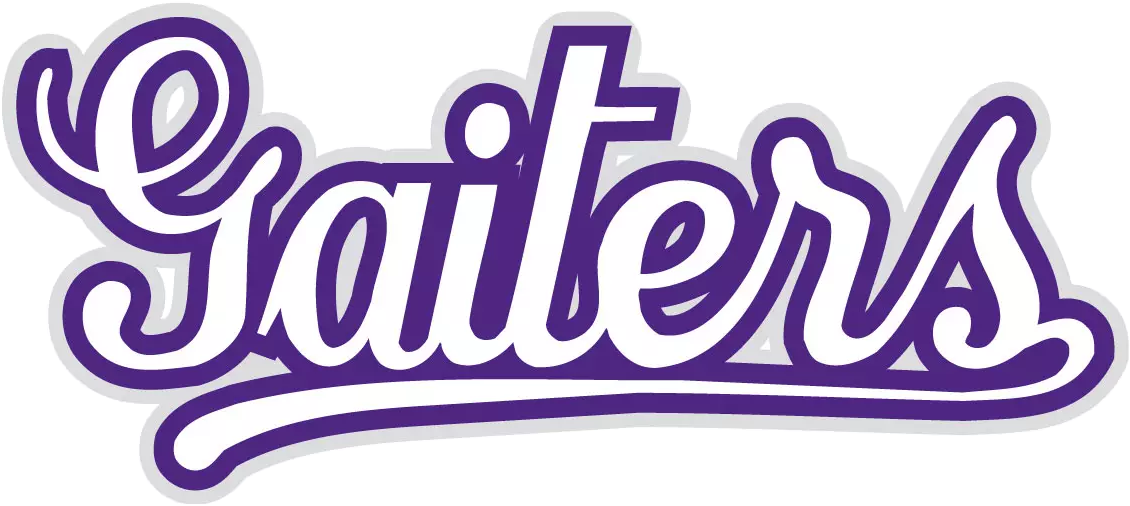

The Bishop's Gaiters is the men's and women's athletic teams that represent Bishop's University in Sherbrooke, Quebec, Canada. The name Gaiter is a nickname used to refer to garments worn over the shoe and lower pants leg, worn by Anglican bishops until the beginning of the 20th century. The teams play in U Sports, mostly competing in the Réseau du sport étudiant du Québec (RSEQ), while the football program competes in the Atlantic University Sport football conference. The Gaiters' home field is Coulter Field, a 2,200 seat capacity stadium located on the university's campus.

== Varsity teams ==
Men's sports	Women's sports
Basketball	Basketball
Football	Golf
Golf	Ice hockey
Lacrosse	Rugby
Rugby	Soccer

=== Basketball ===
The hard-court has also brought Bishop's great success. The 1966-67 Men's Basketball Gaiters were the first basketball champions at Bishop's University, the Gaiters' "machine" rolled through the Ottawa-St. Lawrence Athletic Association with a 15–1 record before triumphing over Ottawa and MacDonald in the league playoffs. The men's basketball team enjoyed their most successful season in 1998, winning the CIAU National Championship, becoming the smallest Canadian university in history to do so. In 2015, the Gaiters won their second RSEQ championship in school history.

The women's basketball team also won back-to-back National Basketball championships in 1983 and 1984.

=== Football ===
The Gaiters football program first began in 1884 and has fielded teams in every decade since then. The team originally played at the intermediate level, but rose to prominence upon entry to the senior level (now varsity in U Sports football) under the guidance of then head coach, Bruce Coulter. The team won conference championships in 1964, 1971, 1986, 1988, and 1990 under Coutler and the school's football stadium was renamed in his honour in 1991 following his retirement. The team won one more Dunsmore Cup in 1994, which marks the last time that the team won a conference championship. However, following the move to the Atlantic University Sport conference in 2017, the team made an appearance in the Loney Bowl championship game in 2019. The team continues to play at Coulter Field and has been led by head coach Chérif Nicolas since 2017.

=== Ice Hockey ===
The Gaiters joined the RSEQ conference for the 2021–22 season, becoming the 37th U SPORTS-level women's hockey university team in Canada. When the Gaiters joined the RSEQ, they became the first-Quebec based program not from the city of Montreal to compete in the conference.

=== Rugby ===
The Bishop's Gaiters men's rugby team was established in 1976–77, the program was founded by long time head coach Bill Robson who led them to a first conference championship in 1990. That success was followed by further championship seasons in 1992, 1993, 1994, 1998 and 2003. The program currently competes in the 7 team RSEQ conference. It has been coached by Nic Clapinson since February 2022 while being led on the field by captain Kyle Corrigan. Clapinson became the fourth coach of the Rugby program, succeeding Bill Robson, Charles Goode, and Andrew Cowell.

== Awards and honors ==
=== Athletes of the Year ===
Year	Female athlete	Sport	Male athlete	Sport	Ref.
2017–18	Edith Noblecilla	Basketball	Carter Filion	Rugby	
2018–19	Erika Scott	Rugby	Josh Bray	Rugby	
2019–20	Amaiquen Siciliano	Basketball	Nervens Demosthene	Basketball	
2022–23	Amaiquen Siciliano	Basketball	Kyle Corrigan	Rugby	

== See also ==
- U Sports
