= Oil Thigh =

Queen's University song

The Oil Thigh is the name given to the anthem and fight song of Queen's University at Kingston and its sports teams, the Queen's Gaels. Although the song's official title is "Queen's College Colours", it is almost universally referred to by the first words of the Gaelic chorus.

== Etymology ==
Oilthigh (pronounced [ˈɔlhɪ(j)]) is the Scottish Gaelic for "university", from oil "educate, rear", which is from Old Irish ail- and taigh "house" (older spelling tigh) plus lenition. It is usually spelt as a single word in modern orthography.

== History ==
The chorus was written in 1891 as part of a longer Gaelic warcry, by three Gaelic-speaking students: Donald Cameron, F.A. McRae, and another called MacLean, whose first name is not known. The rest of the song was written in 1898 by a student, Alfred Lavell, with the title The Queen's College Colours after a disappointing loss to the University of Toronto in order to inspire the team. The first verse is "Queen's College colours we are wearing once again, Soiled as they are by the battle and the rain, Yet another victory to wipe away the stain! So, Gaels, go in and win!"

The second, third and fourth verses are rarely sung.

In 1985 the original "Boys, go in and win" was changed to "Gaels, go in and win" to make the text gender neutral.

The song is often heard sung by students and alumni when the home team scores a point, goal, touchdown, etc., and at other school events. It is usually sung while forming a chain by linking arms behind each other's backs and performing a low-kicking can-can. The Varsity Men's and Women's Rowing teams sing the song to celebrate winning the team points championship at the OUA Rowing Championships and/or the Canadian University Rowing Championships by huddling in a closed circle and performing the traditional low-kicking. The 1892 version uses the tune of the "Battle Hymn of the Republic/John Brown's Body".

Additional stanzas that have fallen out of popular use made reference to historic victories over Yale University, rival McGill University, and the University of Toronto.

== Gaelic translation ==
A distinctive element to the song is the Gaelic words of the chorus. The Gaelic translates to:

Chorus: Oil thigh na Banrighinn a'Banrighinn gu brath! Oil thigh na Banrighinn a'Banrighinn gu brath! Oil thigh na Banrighinn a'Banrighinn gu brath! Cha-gheill! Cha-gheill! Cha-gheill!	English translation: The Queen's College and Queen forever! The Queen's College and Queen forever! The Queen's College and Queen forever! No surrender! No surrender! No surrender!

== See also ==
- "The Blue and White" (song), the fight song of the University of Toronto
