= Queen's Golden Gaels =

Athletic teams that represent Queen's University at Kingston

Queen's Gaels
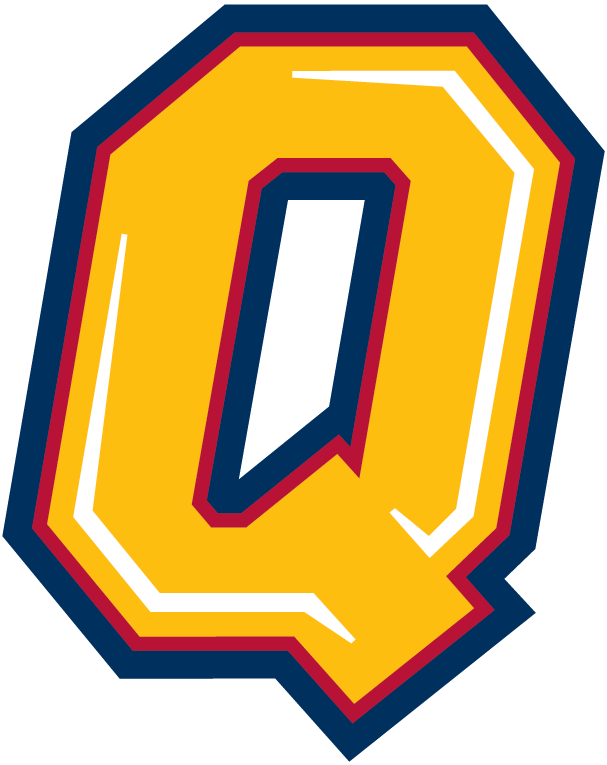
- University: Queen's University at Kingston
- Nickname: Gaels
- Association: U Sports
- Conference: Ontario University Athletics
- Athletic director: Linda Melnick
- Location: Kingston, Ontario
- Varsity teams: 15 (8 men's, 7 women's)
- Football stadium: Richardson Memorial Stadium
- Basketball arena: Athletics and Recreation Centre (ARC)
- Ice hockey arena: Kingston Memorial Centre
- Soccer stadium: Tindall Field
- Other venues: Nixon Field (Rugby Union)
- Colours: Gold, Blue, and Red
- Mascot: Boo Hoo the Bear
- Fight song: Oil Thigh
- Website: gogaelsgo.com

The Queen's Gaels (also known as the Queen's Golden Gaels) is the athletics program representing Queen's University in Kingston, Ontario, Canada. The main athletics facilities include Richardson Memorial Stadium, the Queen's Athletics and Recreation Centre, Nixon Field and Tindall Field. The team colours are gold, blue, and red.

Queen's teams have had a variety of successes both provincially and nationally. Their most recent U Sports National Championship was awarded to the Women's rugby program, who hoisted the Monilex Trophy on home soil at Nixon Field in 2021.

The Gaels football team is one of the oldest and most successful in Canada, including three straight Grey Cup victories in 1922, 1923, and 1924 and four Vanier Cup victories in 1968, 1978, 1992, and 2009. Queen's University hockey teams have competed on three occasions as Stanley Cup finalists in 1895, 1899, and 1906.

The Gaels have also won the 2010–11 U Sports Men's Curling Championship and the women's soccer team has won the national championship in 1988, 2010, and 2011.

The fight song is known as Oil Thigh which was written in 1891 and features Gaelic lyrics which can be heard at many sporting events. The mascot is Boo Hoo the Bear.

== Name ==
Prior to 1947, Queen's teams were commonly referred to as "The Tricolour."

The "Golden Gaels" name was coined in 1947 by Kingston Whig-Standard sports reporter Cliff Bowering, after the football team traded its traditional uniform of red, gold, and blue bands for gold jerseys, gold helmets, and red pants. The name caught on and became the familiar term for Queen's teams by the 1950s. "Gaels" is a reference to Queen's Scottish heritage (Queen's University was established in 1841 by the Presbyterian church).

In September 2008, Queen's Athletics & Recreation Department began referring to the school's teams as "Queen's Gaels." Along with this change, the website was changed from goldengaels.com to gogaelsgo.com. The change was reportedly made to highlight the university's name in promoting the team; however, some have criticized the move as "change for the sake of change." Under media scrutiny, the department claimed it had not in fact officially changed the name of the team; thus, local media sources like the Kingston Whig-Standard and CKWS-TV continue to refer to the team as the "Golden Gaels".

== Varsity teams ==
Men's sports	Women's sports
Basketball	Basketball
Cross country	Cross country
Football	Ice hockey
Ice hockey	Rowing
Rowing	Rugby
Rugby	Soccer
Soccer	Volleyball
Volleyball

=== Basketball ===
Men's Queen's hosted McGill University at the Kingston YMCA on February 6, 1904, in the first-ever Canadian interuniversity basketball game. McGill won 9–7, after a ten-minute overtime period to break a 7–7 tie. The Queen's men's basketball team attended their first ever U SPORTS National Championship in 2022 after upsetting the undefeated Carleton Ravens in the OUA semi-final.

Women's The Queen's Gaels women's basketball team had their strongest finish ever in 2021–22, placing third at the U SPORTS Final 8 tournament which took place at the Athletics & Recreation Centre on Queen's Campus.

=== Cross Country ===
The Queen's Gaels have a men's and women's cross country and distance track program which continually ranks highly on the national rankings. In 2021–22, the Gaels ranked 6th in the country for the men's program and 8th in the country for the women's program.

=== Football ===
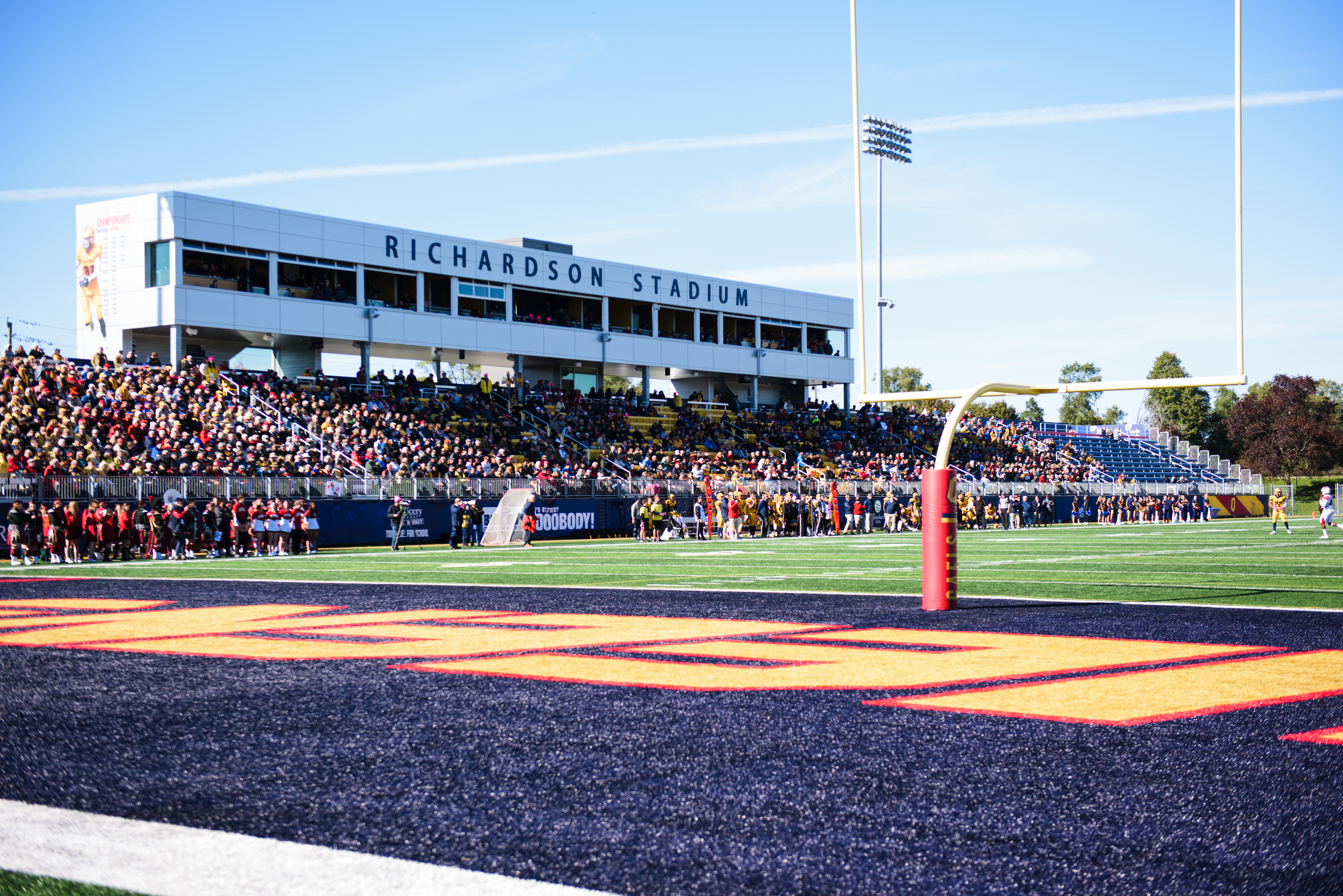
Gaels football at Richardson Memorial Stadium

The Queen's Gaels football program is one of the longest-lived and storied in Canada. The team began organized play in 1883 when the Ontario Rugby Football Union was first founded and won ORFU champions in 1893 and 1894. Queen's has competed continuously since 1882, celebrating its 125th anniversary in 2007. The first organized university football league in Canada, the Canadian Intercollegiate Rugby Football Union (CIRFU), was founded in Kingston in November, 1897, with charter members Queen's, McGill University, and the University of Toronto., the football squad showed continued success, winning three straight Grey Cups in 1922, 1923 and 1924. When the Grey Cup transitioned from amateur competition to the professional Canadian Football League in 1955, the Gaels turned their attention to the Vanier Cup, appearing in the U Sports championship game five times and winning four of those games in 1968, 1978, 1992 and 2009.

=== Ice hockey ===
==== Men's ====
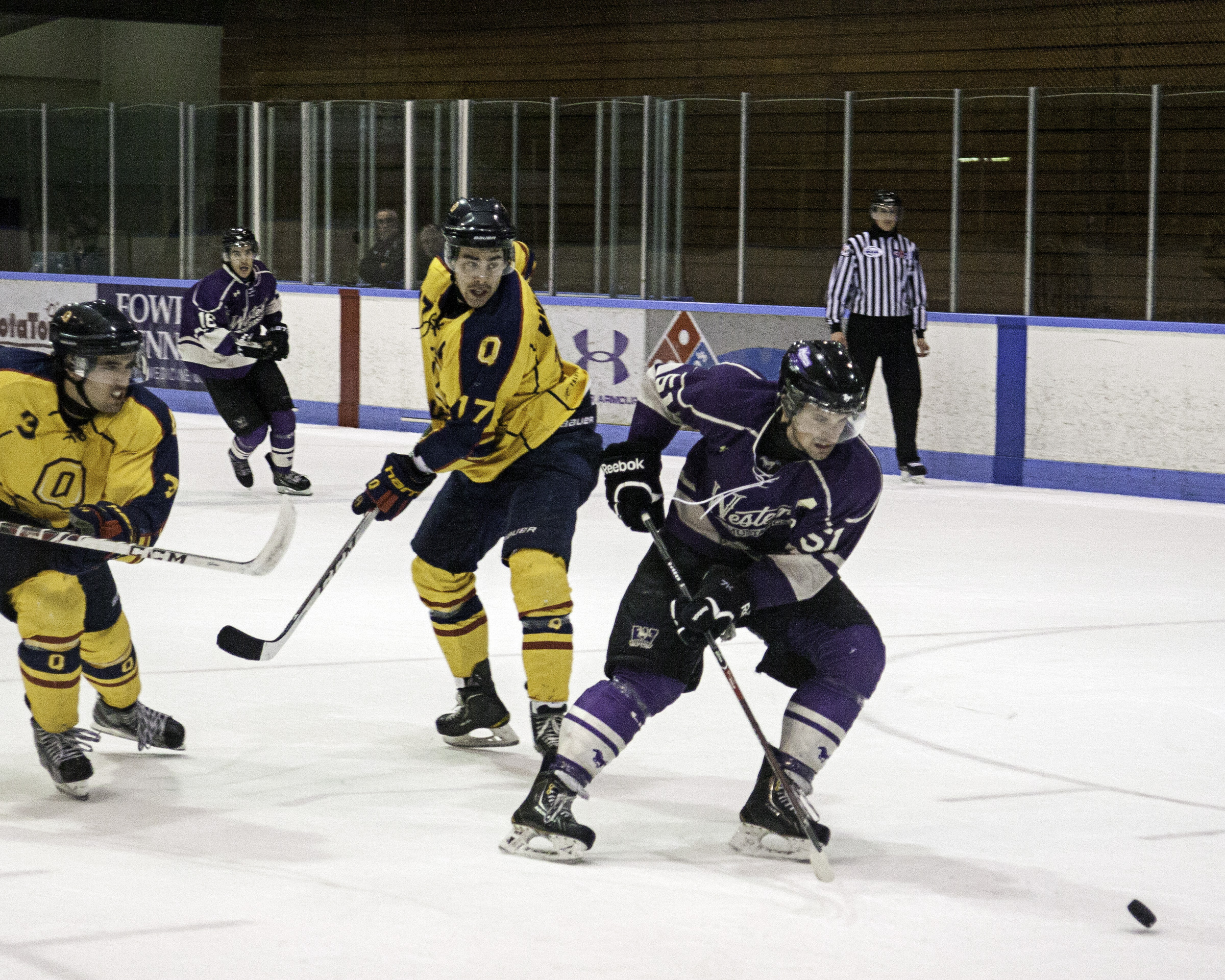
Queens vs Western Mustangs game in 2013

Queen's donated the Queen's Cup for annual Ontario University Athletics competition in 1898. In 1902, the Intercollegiate Hockey Union was formed and the Gaels won the title in 1904 and 1906. In 1909, Queen's won the Intercollegiate league and then won the Allan Cup national championship by defeating the Ottawa Cliffsides in a challenge. The 1910 team won the Allan Cup for a second time by winning the Intercollegiate title and a challenge before losing the Cup in a second challenge to Toronto St. Michael's.

The varsity teams play at the Kingston Memorial Centre following the demolition of the Jock Harty Arena.

==== Women's ====
The Queen's women's hockey program captured their first OUA Championship in 2011. They went on to win it again in 2013. The program hosted the U Sports Championship in 2017.

=== Rowing ===
The Queen's Gaels rowing program is one of the leading programs in the province of Ontario. Their last team OUA Championship was won by the Women's program in 2012. The Women's rowing program also won the Championship in 2010.

Gavin Stone was named OUA Rower of the Year in 2021, also winning the award in 2018. Stone participated in the Tokyo 2020 Olympic Games in the coxless four event.

Other OUA Rowers of the Year from Queen's include: Alex Bernst (2017), Louise Munro (2017), Matthew Christie (2013).

=== Rugby ===
==== Men's ====
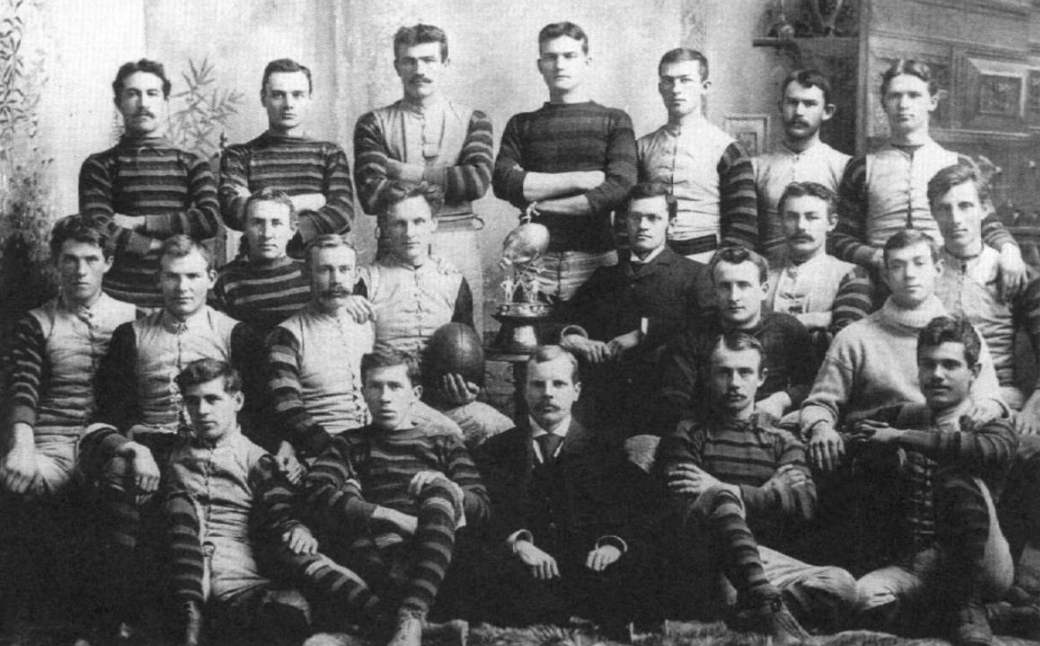
Queens rugby team of 1893

The men's rugby team is regarded as one of the most successful rugby programs in Ontario, and has won the OUA a record 23 times. Their home games are played on Nixon Field, at the heart of Queen's University campus, and crowds often top 2,000 spectators.

Men's rugby is not a U SPORTS designated sport, therefore they compete in a similar non-sanctioned format called the Canadian University Men's Rugby Championship (CUMRC).

The team won the OUA Championship in 2009, 2012, 2013, 2014, 2015, 2017, 2018 and 2019. Other dynasties include the late 80s.

The team is currently coached by Dave Butcher, who took over from Gary Gilks and Peter Huigenbos in 2017.

Nationally capped players that have come through the program are current national captain, Lucas Rumball, Alistair Clark, Sean Duke, Dan Moor, Kainoa Lloyd and Matt Beukeboom.

Women's

The women's rugby program holds a very similar regard in the U SPORTS women's rugby scene, most notably winning the 2021 U SPORTS National Championship on home soil at Nixon Field.

The program has developed numerous national team athletes including Sophie de Goede, Chloe Daniels, McKinley Hunt and many more.

In OUA competition, the program has won the OUA Championship twice; in 2013 and 2019.

=== Soccer ===
Men's

The Queen's Gaels men's soccer program had their most successful season in 2012–13, making their way into the OUA final four, placing fourth overall.

==== Women's ====
The women's soccer team captured gold at the CIS national championship in 2010. They beat rival Wilfrid Laurier 1–0 in the CIS final. Striker Jacqueline Tessier led the CIS in scoring during the regular season, tallying 18 goals in 16 games.

In 2006, earned silver medals in the CIS national championships, thanks largely to striker Eilish McConville. McConville led all CIS players with 22 goals during the regular season, and was named the CIS Player of the year as a result.

=== Volleyball ===
Men's

The Queen's men's volleyball program has won eleven OUA Championships, most recently in back-to-back years (2024-25, 2025-26). Their other provincial titles came in (1971–72, 1999–00, 2001–02, 2005–06, 2006–07, 2011–12, 2018–19, 2019–20).

Women's

The Queen's women's volleyball team won their only OUA Championship in 2011–12. Most recently, Arielle Palermo and Caroline Livingston of the Gaels have represented Canada on the Women's National team in the Volleyball Nations League.

== Varsity clubs ==
Queen's Athletics & Recreation has almost 30 varsity clubs within their sport model. These include:

Men's sports	Women's sports
Baseball	Artistic swimming
Curling	Curling
Cycling	Cycling
Fencing	Fastpitch softball
Golf	Fencing
Lacrosse	Field hockey
Nordic skiing	Figure skating
Rugby	Golf
Squash	Lacrosse
Sailing	Nordic skiing
Swimming	Squash
Tennis	Sailing
Track and field	Swimming
Triathlon	Tennis
Ultimate frisbee	Track and field
Water polo	Triathlon
Wrestling	Ultimate frisbee
	Water polo
	Wrestling

=== Baseball ===
The Queen's baseball team won their first OUA championship in 2022 against the University of Toronto Varsity Blues.

=== Curling ===
The men's curling team, in 2010, earned the gold medal at the CIS national championship in Edmonton, Alberta. The team led by Jonathan Beuk went 5–1 in Round Robin play before beating the Manitoba Bisons in the semi-final and the UPEI Panthers in the Championship. The Gaels qualified for the 2011 World University Games in Erzurum, Turkey where they represented Canada. The team finished fifth after losing a tie-breaker match to the Czech Republic.

=== Fencing ===
The Queen’s Varsity Fencing Club (QFC) is a volunteer- and student-run university varsity club. It maintains a safe space for recreational and competitive student-athletes to take part in the sport of fencing. QFC provides a positive and supportive environment for fencers to perform to the best of their ability with emphasis on personal development, leadership, scholarship, and competitive opportunity. Queen's Men's Fencing Team finished seventh overall at the 2024 Men's OUA Fencing Championship hosted by the University of Ottawa at the EY Centre from March 16-17. Queen's Women's Fencing finished in sixth place overall at the 2024 OUA Women's Fencing Championship hosted by the University of Toronto. In 2023, the Queen's Women's Fencing Team won the Overall bronze and the Men's Team finished fourth at the OUA Fencing Championships, hosted by Brock University from February 17-19.

=== Track and field ===
Track and field is reported as the first sport at Queen's University. It began in 1873, as competitions held annually to celebrate the university's inauguration on October 16 and included traditional Scottish competitions such as the caber toss. These competitions remained major university events into the early 20th century.

When the CIAU (now U Sports) began, the Queen's University track and field team was one of the only teams to participate in all three athletics sports – indoor track and field, outdoor track and field, and cross-country.

In 1963, Rolf Lund was named head coach of the team, marking a turning point in the team's history. Through the late 1960s, 1970s and 1980s, the Queen's track and field team saw many successful athletes. Some notable athletes include Olympians Sheridon Baptiste, Anne Marie Malone, Victor Gooding, school 1500m record holder Bob McCormack, and past head coach and multiple CIS champion Melody Torcalacci.

=== Sailing ===
Sailing began as a competitive sport for Queen's in 1937 when the first regatta for Canadian universities was sponsored in Kingston. For many years Queen's Sailing operated as an AMS student club, unaffiliated with Queen’s Athletics. As such, in any given year the club existed based solely on the initiative of individuals attending the university. This resulted in ad hoc continuity from year-to-year with the club sometimes thriving and other times not. The governance structure was informal and membership, practice and regatta participation was done on a word-of-mouth basis. In those days there was no such thing as ‘tryouts’ or team ‘officials'. If you were a sailor or interested in sailing and were available, you competed. For the early years, funding was minimal and students paid much of the costs themselves. Regattas were typically no more than a car-drive away. Royal Military College (RMC), who had a fleet of small boats with a boathouse and regatta facilities, were generous in sharing these for practice and competitions. Races were often held in Kingston because of this, however sometimes entailed a road-trip to Toronto or Montreal and sometimes farther afield in Canada or to inter-collegiate regattas in Boston, Annapolis and elsewhere in New England.

In the late 1970's, still operating as a club, Queen's sailing caught the eye of Dr. Ronald Watts, Principal and Vice-Chancellor; and also a keen lifelong sailor. Dr. Watts helped increase the visibility of the team/club within the university sports community. This facilitated approval for athlete funds to offset some of the costs to compete. The Queen's sailing team began participating in more U.S. Intercollegiate Sailing Association (ICSA) regattas. The increased visibility and access to sailboats at RMC also helped promote more participation by New England Universities in Kingston regattas. The success and broadened participation by Queen's in these years led to their ranking in the top 10 amongst all ICSA universities. In 1977 and again in 1979 Terry McLaughlin, Queen's BA ‘79, was recognized as an All-American ICSA member. The successful performance of Queen's sailing club created a reputation amongst young sailors ready for university. It wasn’t abnormal to hear from students that the opportunity to participate on Queen's sailing team was an incentive to attend university there.

At some point in the 80s sailing at Queen’s faded. Whether this was a result of access to boats at RMC, a lack of funding, or other is unclear. This ebbing of interest began to turn around in the late 80’s and by 1992 things had changed. In that year, student funding through an optional AMS fee, and in particular the accumulation of alumni donations into the Queen’s Sailing Team Account allowed the team to purchase a membership at the Kingston Yacht Club (KYC) and enter into a cost-sharing arrangement with Kingston Yacht Club for the purchase of 10 new 420 sailboats. This resurgence brought more organization and formality than the team had known previously. Recruitment, tryouts and coaching became some of the new norms for the club. Along with the creation of executive positions with defined roles and responsibilities, the club was structured to last indefinitely. In 2001 two additional members of Queen’s sailing team were recognized as All-Americans, Oskar Johansson (BA Economics and BSc Mech Eng ‘02) and Bernard Luttmer (BSc Eng ’02).

In 2008, the Queen's Journal newspaper wrote an article referring to Queen's sailing as, "... one of the Universities best-kept secrets". With multiple national titles in fleet racing, team racing, match racing and keelboat racing; as well as strong North American and international finishes that include a first in the 2016 Student Yachting World Cup Keelboat Championship, held in France as part of the student FISU Games, the club’s visibility has become much less of a secret over the years. Queen's Sailing is also one of the few Canadian Universities in the Inter-Collegiate Sailing Association (ICSA), specifically within the Middle Atlantic Intercollegiate Sailing Association (MAISA) district of the United States; this allows Queen's Sailing to compete against schools such as Georgetown, UPENN, Princeton, St. Mary's and the US Naval Academy.

Today, Queen's Sailing continues to operate as a student led sports team with the recognition of being a Varsity Club Team. It continues to maintain a governance model with defined positions identifying roles and responsibilities. Participation from the student body has increased significantly and both a Recreational group and Inter-Collegiate competitive group of sailors exist in any given year. Recruitment and on-the-water tryouts begin during Frosh Week. Despite, and possibly because of, these changes the success and reputation of Queen's Sailing has continued to grow. Participation continues both nationally and internationally and the winning success the team has seen also continues. Participants in some cases are sons or daughters of past Queen's sailors. This is due in part because the sailing legacy establish over the years at Queen's University helps to attract not only academically qualified students, but also students who want to sail for Queen's. Cha Geill!

=== Squash ===
The women's squash program has won eight OUA titles.

=== Wrestling ===
The Queen’s wrestling teams compete in the OUA, with placers moving on to Usports Championships.

== Awards and honors ==
=== Athletes of the Year ===
The annual Athletic Awards gala is known as the Colour Awards for Varsity Teams and Clubs.

For a full list of award winners, go to https://gogaelsgo.com/sports/2011/8/7/GEN_0807111523.aspx.

== Mascot ==
Boo Hoo the Bear is the mascot of Queen's University. Boo Hoo wears a vest and tam o' shanter in the Royal Stewart tartan.

Originally, Boo Hoo was a real bear which was paraded around at football games and kept in the basement of Grant Hall. The first bear was a pet of Bill Hughes who brought him to Queen's when he was hired as a boxing trainer. Music has been composed that was inspired by the Boo Hoo dynasty — "Boo-Hoo's march for piano", "Boo Hoo's Queen's Dominion Victory March" (1922) and "The Mascot: Boo Hoo's March to Queen's Rugby Team" — by Oscar Telgmann in Toronto in the 1920s.

This was the first of a succession of five bears who lived at the stadium until the 1950s. The story of each bear is still unknown, though no bear reached full size. The Queen's student government, the Alma Mater Society, was in charge of bears three and four.

The mascot was revived in its present form in the 1980s by the Queen's Bands Cheerleaders and is currently in his eighth incarnation, giving him the full title of "King Boo Hoo the Eighth". He is seen often around the Queen's campus, at the Queen's Gaels Canadian football games, frosh week and homecoming, and has been on the cover of several issues of Golden Words.

== Sources ==
- https://everitas.rmcalumni.ca/rmcc-birthplace-of-both-canadian-and-north-american-intercollegiate-competitive-sailing/
- https://gogaelsgo.com/sports/2008/9/20/Sail_0920081635.aspx
- https://collegesailing.org/hall-of-fame/all-american/all-american-trophy-overview
- https://www.queensjournal.ca/queens-sailing-team-cruises-to-world-championship-victory/
- https://www.queensjournal.ca/tag/sailing/
- https://cicsailing.ca/about-us
- https://www.thewhig.com/2014/12/09/student-condo-project-sails-along
