= Tip Logan =

Canadian football player (1927–2007)

Profile
- Position: Halfback

Personal information
- Born: November 30, 1927; Fort Erie, Ontario
- Died: November 25, 2007 (aged 79); Hamilton, Ontario
- Listed height: 6 ft 0 in (1.83 m)
- Listed weight: 200 lb (91 kg)

Career history
- 1951–1955: Hamilton Tiger Cats

Awards and highlights
- Grey Cup champion (1953)

John Robert Logan, nicknamed Tip Logan (November 30, 1927 – November 25, 2007), was a Canadian professional football player who played for the Hamilton Tiger Cats. He won the Grey Cup with them in 1953. Born in Fort Erie, Ontario, he previously attended Queen's University. Logan later worked as an insurance agent in Hamilton. He died in 2007.
