= Guelph Gryphons football =

University Canadian football team

Guelph Gryphons
- Guelph Gryphons logo
- First season: 1950
- Athletic director: Scott McRoberts
- Head coach: Mark Surya; 3rd year, 13–11 (.542)
- Other staff: Matt Berry (DC); Mark Surya (OC); Donnavan Carter (STC)
- Home stadium: Alumni Stadium
- Stadium capacity: 8,000
- Stadium surface: Field Turf
- Location: Guelph, Ontario
- League: U Sports
- Conference: OUA (1980–present)
- Past associations: OIFC (1957–1966); CCIFC (1967–1970); OUAA (1971–1973); OQIFC (1974–1979)
- All-time record: –
- Postseason record: –

Titles
- Vanier Cups: 1; 1984
- Churchill Bowls: 1; 1984
- Yates Cups: 4; 1984, 1992, 1996, 2015
- Hec Crighton winners: 0
- Colours: Red, Black, and Gold
- Outfitter: Adidas
- Rivals: Western Mustangs; Waterloo Warriors; Wilfrid Laurier Golden Hawks
- Website: gryphons.ca

The Guelph Gryphons football team represents the University of Guelph in Guelph, Ontario in the sport of Canadian football in the Ontario University Athletics conference of U Sports. The Guelph Gryphons football team has been in continuous operation since 1950. The team has won one Vanier Cup national championship in 1984, which is also their only appearance in the title game. The Gryphons have won one Vanier Cup and four Yates Cup conference championships, in 1984, 1992, 1996 and 2015.

== History ==
The team can trace their roots back to 1950 when the team played in the Intercollegiate Intermediate Football Union. Through numerous league evolutions, the Gryphons were a founding member of the Ontario University Athletics in 1980 and continue to play there to this day. The team won their first Yates Cup championship in 1984 and also won their first and only Vanier Cup championship that year against the Mount Allison Mounties. While the team was competitive in the 1990s and won two more Yates Cup championships in 1992 and 1996, the 1984 Vanier Cup was the program's only appearance in the title game.

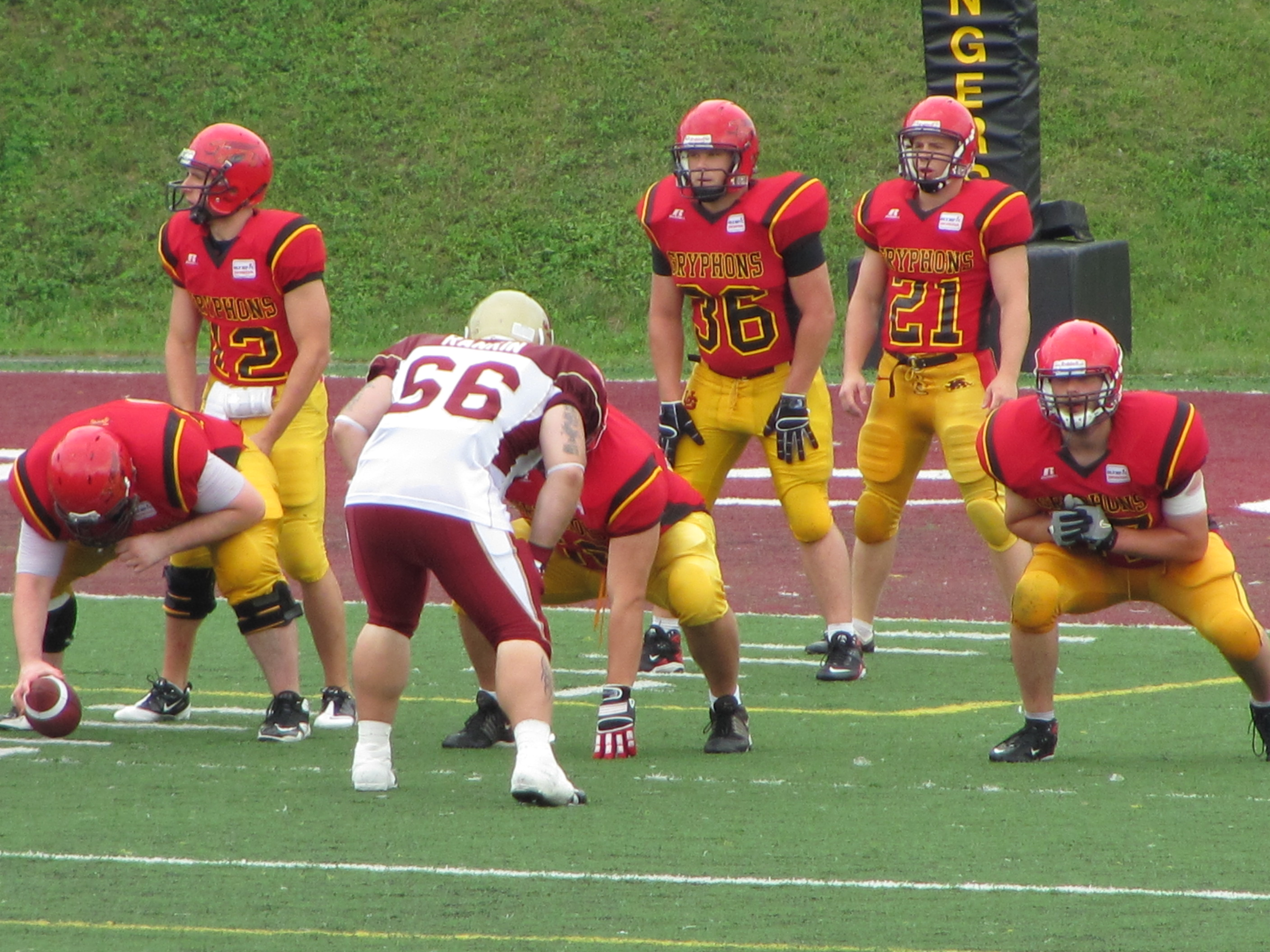
The Gryphons on offense against the Concordia Stingers in 2010.

In the early 2000s, the program remained largely in the middle of the standings as the team had been at or within one game of .500 for six of those years and did not have a winning record at any point in the decade. However, led by then-head coach Kyle Walters, the upstart 4-4 Gryphons made a Yates Cup appearance in the 2007 OUA championship game, but lost to the Western Mustangs.

Stu Lang was named head coach for the 2010 season and the program established a dominant run. The team finished with a 7–1 record and a 2nd-place finish for four straight seasons from 2012 to 2015, culminating in the program's fourth Yates Cup win in 2015.

Lang resigned after the successful 2015 season and Kevin MacNeill was named interim head coach for 2016. In the fall of 2017, the football team officially opened the Football Pavilion, a state of the art locker room and complex for the football team, and its coaches, donated by Lang. The team continued to qualify for the playoffs and remain competitive under MacNeill, finishing 5–3 in 2017. However, the team was blown out in a 66-12 OUA semi-final loss to the Western Mustangs. After MacNeill left the program, Todd Galloway was named interim head coach for the 2018 season and led the team all the way to the Yates Cup where they were again soundly defeated by the Mustangs. Ryan Sheahan was named head coach on January 10, 2019 and led the team to a 6–2 record and third-place finish in his first season. The COVID-19 Pandemic cancelled the 2020 season. In the shortened 2021 season, the Gryphons dropped to 3-3, and fell even further during the 2022 season to 1-7 under Sheahan's hand.

== Recent season results ==
Season	Games	Won	Lost	OL	Pct %	PF	PA	Standing	Playoffs
2000	8	3	5	0	0.375	165	210	5th in OUA	Did not qualify
2001	8	3	5	0	0.375	164	237	7th in OUA	Lost to Ottawa Gee-Gees in OUA quarter-finals 38-15
2002	8	2	6	0	0.250	102	237	8th in OUA	Lost to McMaster Marauders in OUA quarter-finals 71-11
2003	8	2	6	0	0.250	161	285	9th in OUA	Did not qualify
2004	8	4	4	0	0.500	169	238	5th in OUA	Lost to Ottawa Gee-Gees in OUA quarter-finals 33-9
2005	8	3	5	1	0.375	208	242	6th in OUA	Lost to Ottawa Gee-Gees in OUA quarter-finals 35-21
2006	8	2	6	-	0.250	206	217	8th in OUA	Did not qualify
2007	8	4	4	-	0.500	278	124	5th in OUA	Defeated McMaster Marauders in OUA quarter-finals 25-21; Defeated Wilfrid Laurier Golden Hawks in OUA semi-finals 38-31; Lost to Western Mustangs in Yates Cup 34-21
2008	8	4	4	-	0.500	255	173	4th in OUA	Lost to Ottawa Gee-Gees in OUA quarter-finals 42-37
2009	8	3	5	-	0.375	310	253	6th in OUA	Lost to Western Mustangs in OUA quarter-finals 37-18
2010	8	4	4	-	0.500	159	192	5th in OUA	Lost to Wilfrid Laurier Golden Hawks in OUA quarter-finals 42-10
2011	8	2	6	-	0.250	209	197	8th in OUA	Did not qualify
2012	8	7	1	-	0.875	251	209	2nd in OUA	Defeated Queen's Golden Gaels in OUA semi-finals 42-39; Lost to McMaster Marauders in Yates Cup 30-13
2013	8	7	1	-	0.875	252	139	2nd in OUA	Lost to Queen's Golden Gaels in OUA semi-finals 34-17
2014	8	7	1	-	0.875	343	174	2nd in OUA	Defeated Western Mustangs in OUA semi-finals 51-26; Lost to McMaster Marauders in Yates Cup 20-15
2015	8	7	1	-	0.875	404	222	2nd in OUA	Defeated Carleton Ravens in OUA semi-finals 33-21; Defeated Western Mustangs in Yates Cup 23-17; Lost to Montreal Carabins in Mitchell Bowl 25-10
2016	8	3	5	-	0.375	244	227	6th in OUA	Lost to McMaster Marauders in OUA quarter-finals 17-11
2017	8	5	3	-	0.625	293	196	5th in OUA	Defeated Ottawa Gee-Gees in OUA quarter-finals 30-8; Lost to Western Mustangs in OUA semi-finals 66-12
2018	8	5	3	-	0.625	236	175	3rd in OUA	Defeated Waterloo Warriors in OUA quarter-finals 45-34; Defeated Ottawa Gee-Gees in OUA semi-finals 27-22; Lost to Western Mustangs in Yates Cup 63-14
2019	8	6	2	-	0.750	242	142	3rd in OUA	Defeated Carleton Ravens in OUA quarter-finals 22-17; Lost to McMaster Marauders in OUA semi-finals 19-9
2020	Season cancelled due to COVID-19 pandemic								
2021	6	3	3	-	0.500	140	86	3rd in OUA West	Defeated Wilfrid Laurier Golden Hawks in OUA quarter-finals 31-18; Lost to Western Mustangs in OUA semi-finals 33–12
2022	8	1	7	-	0.125	158	319	9th in OUA	Did not qualify
2023	8	3	5	-	0.375	248	214	8th in OUA	Did not qualify
2024	8	6	2	-	0.750	276	200	3rd in OUA	Defeated Ottawa Gee-Gees in OUA quarter-finals 26-15; Lost to Western Mustangs in OUA semi-finals 30-19
2025	8	3	5	-	0.375	236	240	7th in OUA	Defeated Western Mustangs in OUA quarter-finals 18-17; Lost to Wilfrid Laurier Golden Hawks in OUA semi-finals 37-30
2026	8	4	4	-	0.500	287	187	5th in OUA	Lost to Windsor Lancers in OUA quarter-finals 28–24

== National postseason results ==
Vanier Cup Era (1965-current)
Year	Game	Opponent	Result
1984	Churchill Bowl Vanier Cup	Calgary Mount Allison	W 12-7 W 22-13
1992	Churchill Bowl	Queen's	L 16-23
1996	Churchill Bowl	Saskatchewan	L 9-33
2015	Mitchell Bowl	Montreal	L 10-25

Guelph is 1–3 in national semi-final games and 1–0 in the Vanier Cup.

== Head coaches ==
Name	Years	Notes
Bill Mitchell	1950–1953	
Jay Fry	1954–1955	
Tom Mooney	1956–1960	
Don Hayes	1961–1962	
Bill Graham	1963–1965	
Bill Mitchell	1966–1969	
Dick Brown	1970–1978	
Tom Dimitroff Sr.	1979–1983	
John Musselman	1984–1986	
Dan McNally	1987–2000	
Tom Arnott	2001–2005	
Kyle Walters	2006–2009	
Stu Lang	2010–2015	
Kevin MacNeill	2016–2017	
Todd Galloway	2018	
Ryan Sheahan	2019–2023	
Mark Surya	2024–present	

== National award winners ==
- J. P. Metras Trophy: Peter Langford (1982), Louie Godry (1986)
- Presidents' Trophy: John Rush (2015)
- Peter Gorman Trophy: John Lowe (1978)
- Russ Jackson Award: Zach Androschuk (2012)
- Frank Tindall Trophy: Dan McNally (1996)

== Guelph Gryphons in the CFL ==
As of the start of the 2026 CFL season, ten former Gryphons players are on CFL teams' rosters:

- A. J. Allen, Ottawa Redblacks
- Johnny Augustine, Hamilton Tiger-Cats
- Clark Barnes, Calgary Stampeders
- Simon Chaves, Toronto Argonauts
- Vyshonne Janusas, Calgary Stampeders
- Royce Metchie, Edmonton Elks
- Kian Schaffer-Baker, Saskatchewan Roughriders
- Isaiah Smith, Toronto Argonauts
- Kiondre Smith, Hamilton Tiger-Cats
- Coulter Woodmansey, Hamilton Tiger-Cats
