= Bob Howes =

American football player (1943–2026)

Profile
- Position: Centre

Personal information
- Born: January 4, 1943; Kirkland Lake, Ontario, Canada
- Died: February 16, 2026 (aged 83); Orillia, Ontario, Canada
- Listed height: 6 ft 4 in (1.93 m)
- Listed weight: 246 lb (112 kg)

Career information
- University: Queen's

Career history
- 1968–1971: BC Lions
- 1972–1981: Edmonton Eskimos

Awards and highlights
- 5× Grey Cup champion (1975, 1978−1981); CFL West All-Star (1973)

Robert Alexander Howes (January 4, 1943 – February 16, 2026) was a Canadian professional football offensive lineman who played fourteen seasons in the Canadian Football League (CFL), mainly for the Edmonton Eskimos. He was a part of five Grey Cup championship teams with the Eskimos. Howes played college football and basketball at Queen's University, and has coached the Queen's Golden Gaels football team for many years, both as an assistant and as head coach. His son Beau Howes played quarterback for the Gaels during the 1990s. Bob Howes died in Orillia, Ontario on February 16, 2026, at the age of 83.
