= 12th Grey Cup =

1924 Canadian Football championship game

Queen's University	Toronto Balmy Beach Beachers
(4–0)	(3–1)
11	3
Head coach: Billy Hughes	Head coach: A. Rodden & A. Buett
	1	2	3	4	Total
Queen's University	2	3	6	0	11
Toronto Balmy Beach Beachers	0	1	0	2	3
- Date: November 29, 1924
- Stadium: Varsity Stadium
- Location: Toronto
- Attendance: 5,978

The 12th Grey Cup was played on November 29, 1924, before 5,978 fans at Varsity Stadium at Toronto.

Queen's University defeated the Toronto Balmy Beach Beachers 11–3.
