= Doug Hargreaves =

Canadian air force officer (1931–2016)

- Born: John Walter Douglas Hargreaves; December 20, 1931; Sault Ste. Marie, Ontario, Canada
- Died: July 5, 2016 (aged 84)
- Education: Queen's University
- Occupation(s): Air force officer, athletic coach, and educator

John Walter Douglas Hargreaves (December 20, 1931 –July 5, 2016) was a Canadian air force officer, athletic coach, and educator. During his 19-year tenure as head football coach, he led the Queen's Golden Gaels to 16 consecutive OQIFC playoff appearances, winning 9 of 13 league championship games and posting two undefeated seasons. Under Coach Hargreaves, the Gaels appeared in three National Championship games, winning the Vanier Cup twice, in 1978 and 1992. Hargreaves earned OQIFC Coach of the Year honours five times while at Queen's. In 1983, he was awarded the Frank Tindall Trophy as the top intercollegiate head coach in Canada. He retired after the 1994 season having coached more games than any coach in Canadian university football history.

== Early life and career ==
Hargreaves was born and raised in Sault Ste. Marie, Ontario. From 1951 to 1955. he attended Queen's University, playing varsity football and basketball, and was an Officer Cadet in the University Reserve Training program (URTP). He earned his Wings in 1956 and completed a Short Term Commission with the Royal Canadian Air Force. Following his military tour, he was employed as a teacher at Sault Collegiate Institute, coaching a number of sports including football, where his 1958 team was quarterbacked by future Governor General David Johnston. To supplement his income, he also sold insurance and worked as a TV weatherman.

In 1962 Hargreaves re-enlisted in the RCAF as a pilot and became a flight instructor on the Canadair CT-114 Tutor. In 1965, he transitioned from military operations to the athletic staff at Royal Military College of Canada, where he became assistant athletic director and football coach, and in 1967, basketball coach. In 1970 he was posted to CFB Shearwater to be the new Physical Education and Recreation Officer (PERO) for the base. He also took on a volunteer job as the assistant football coach at Dalhousie University in nearby Halifax. Shortly thereafter, he was promoted from Flight Lieutenant to Squadron Leader, becoming Command-level PERO based at CFB Trenton. He commuted to that job from Kingston, while also joining the staff of his former Queen's football coach, the legendary Frank Tindall.

In 1972, he retired from the RCAF with the rank of Major. He moved back to Dalhousie University as athletic director and football coach, and earned an M.Sc., before being hired as the head coach position at Queen's in 1976, taking over from Frank Tindall.

== Honours and legacy ==
Doug Hargreaves was inducted into the Queen's Football Hall of Fame in 1995, the year after he retired, and in 2003, he was inducted into the Kingston Sports Hall of Fame. In addition to the Queen's Distinguished Service Award, Hargreaves also won the John Orr Award, (1997) and the Jim Bennett Achievement Award (2005). Each year at Queen's, the Doug Hargreaves Award is given to the Most Outstanding Offensive Football Player in his honour.

In 2012, he received an Honorary Doctorate of Laws from Queen's in recognition of his contributions to the university, intercollegiate athletics, the sport of football nationally and in Europe and for the positive impact he had on the lives of many hundreds of young people.
