= Coulter Field (stadium) =

Stadium in Quebec, Canada

- Interactive map of Coulter Field
- Location: Lennoxville, Quebec
- Coordinates: 45.3651°N 71.8411°W
- Owner: Bishop's University
- Capacity: 2,200
- Surface: Turf

Tenant
- Bishop's Gaiters (U Sports)

Coulter Field is a multi-purpose stadium at the Bishop's University in Lennoxville, Quebec. It is home to the Bishop's Gaiters rugby, soccer, and football varsity teams. Coulter Field has a fixed seating capacity of 2,200. The field is named for Bruce Coulter, who was the football team's head coach from 1962 to 1990 and is a member of the Canadian Football Hall of Fame. Coulter Field is also used by the Montreal Alouettes of the Canadian Football League as a practice facility.
