= Bruce Coulter =

Canadian football player and coach

No. 65
- Positions: Defensive back, Head coach

Personal information
- Born: November 19, 1927; Toronto, Ontario, Canada
- Died: June 5, 2018 (aged 90)

Career information
- University: Toronto

Career history

Playing
- 1947: Toronto Balmy Beach Beachers
- 1948–1957: Montreal Alouettes

Coaching
- 1958–1961: McGill University
- 1962–1990: Bishop's University

Awards and highlights
- Grey Cup champion (1949)
- Canadian Football Hall of Fame (Class of 1997)

Bruce Coulter (November 19, 1927 – June 5, 2018) was a Canadian professional football player and coach. He played ten seasons for the Montreal Alouettes, winning the Grey Cup in 1949. He then went on to coach 29 seasons for the Bishop's Gaiters. He was inducted into the Canadian Football Hall of Fame in 1997.

Coulter was also a curler, and represented Quebec at the 1957 Macdonald Brier.
