= U Sports football =

University competition in Canadian football

- Current season, competition or edition: 2026 U Sports football season
- Formerly: CIAU football, CIS football
- Sport: Canadian football
- Founded: 1961; 65 years ago
- No. of teams: 27, in four conferences
- Country: Canada
- Most recent champion: Montreal Carabins (2025)
- Most titles: Laval Rouge et Or (12)
- Broadcasters: CBC Sports (in English); TVA Sports (in French)
- Related competitions: Vanier Cup
- Website: usports.ca/fball

U Sports football (French: Football U Sports) is the highest level of amateur play of Canadian football and operates under the auspices of U Sports, Canada's governing body for university sports. Twenty-seven teams from Canadian universities are divided into four athletic conferences, drawing from the four regional associations of U Sports: Canada West Universities Athletic Association, Ontario University Athletics, Réseau du sport étudiant du Québec, and Atlantic University Sport. At the end of every season, the champions of each conference advance to semifinal bowl games; the winners of these meet in the Vanier Cup national championship.

== History ==
The origins of North American football can be traced here, where the first documented game was played at University College at the University of Toronto in 1861. A number of U Sports programs have been in existence since the origins of the sport. It is from these Canadian universities that the game now known as Canadian football began. In 1874, McGill University (Montreal) challenged Harvard University (Cambridge, Massachusetts, US) to a series of games.

The Grey Cup, the championship trophy of the professional Canadian Football League (CFL) since its founding in the 1950s, was originally contested by teams from the University of Toronto and Queen's University and other amateur teams since 1909. Many U Sports players have gone on to professional careers in the CFL and elsewhere; a number are drafted annually in the Canadian College Draft. In 2021, there were a record 208 U Sports alumni on CFL rosters.

Maya Turner became the first woman to play in a U Sports regular-season football game, on September 23, 2023, as a Manitoba Bisons kicker. She kicked the game-winning field goal in overtime for the Bisons against the Regina Rams.

U Sports will add flag football as a women's sport beginning the 2027–28 season on a pilot basis; it has been a varsity sport in Quebec's RSEQ since 2021.

== Season structure ==
=== Regular season ===
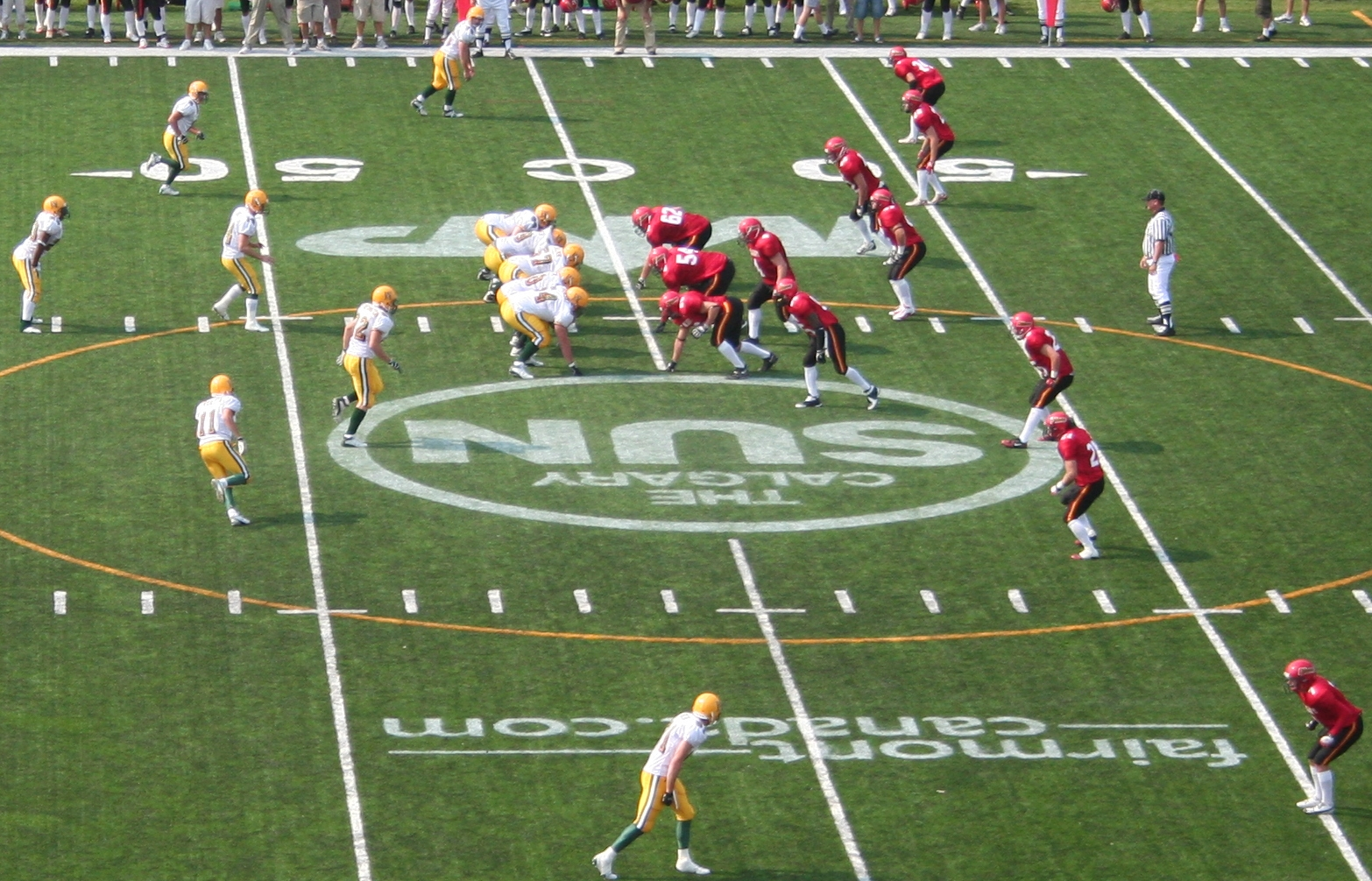
The Calgary Dinos playing against the Alberta Golden Bears in 2006.

The regular season is nine to ten weeks long, depending on the conference, and, as of 2019, opens on the weekend before the Labour Day weekend. Teams play eight regular season games and regular season games are in-conference with exhibition (pre-season) games being played between conferences. Throughout the season, there are featured homecoming and rivalry games in most regions. Following the conclusion of the regular season, the Hec Crighton Trophy is awarded annually to the Most Valuable Player of U Sports football.

=== Playoffs ===
After the regular season, single elimination playoff games are held between the top teams in each conference to determine conference champions. In the Atlantic, Canada West, and Quebec conferences, the top four teams qualify for the playoffs. In Ontario, the top seven teams qualify with the top team receiving a playoff bye to the next round. Because the OUA teams have conference playoffs that last three weeks instead of two, the first round of the post-season in the OUA occurs during the same week that each of the other three conferences are playing their last regular season games. Each conference has its own championship trophy; the Hardy Trophy in the West, the Yates Cup in Ontario, the Dunsmore Cup in Quebec and the Jewett Trophy in the Atlantic conference. The conference champions proceed to national semifinal bowl games: the Mitchell Bowl and the Uteck Bowl. The participant conferences of each bowl are determined several years in advance on a rotating basis.

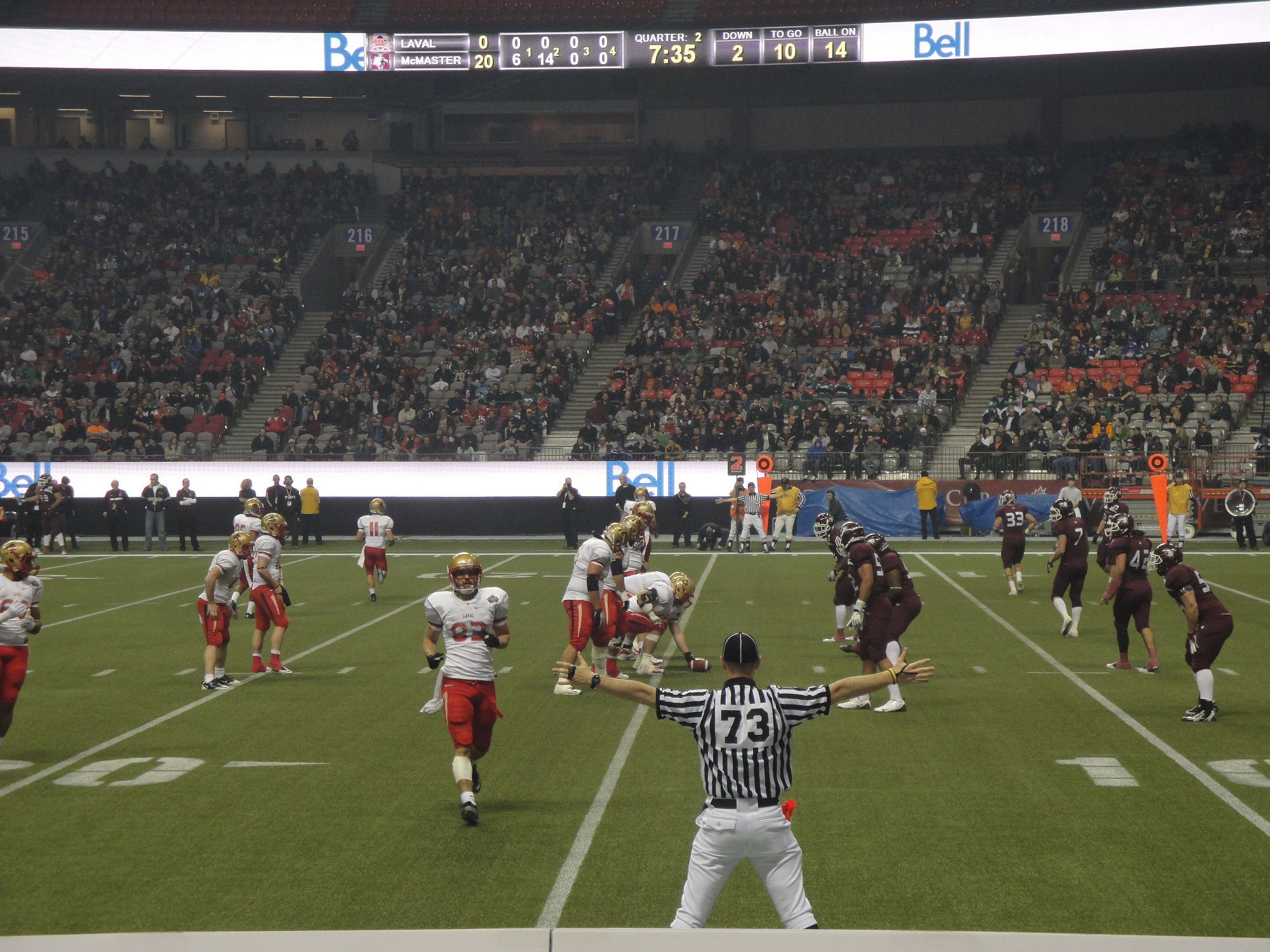
The Laval Rouge et Or on offence against the McMaster Marauders in the second quarter of the 47th Vanier Cup.

=== Vanier Cup ===
The winners of each bowl game meet in the Vanier Cup national championship, first established in 1965 and named in honour of Governor General Georges Vanier. The game was held in Toronto every year through 2003 when host conference bids were first accepted, yielding a move to Hamilton for 2004 and 2005, followed by Saskatoon in 2006. Quebec City, Vancouver, Montreal, London, and Kingston have since hosted Vanier Cup games.

== Teams ==
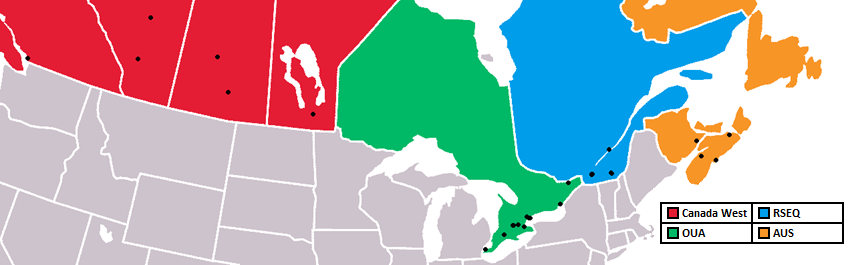

=== Atlantic University Sport ===
Institution	Team	City	Province	Founded	Head coach	Enrollment	Endowment	Football stadium	Capacity	Jewett Trophies	Vanier Cups
Mount Allison University	Mounties	Sackville	NB	1955	Peter Fraser	2,694	$110M	Alumni Field	2,500	6	0
Acadia University	Axemen	Wolfville	NS	1957	Jeff Cummins	4,358	$96M	Raymond Field	3,000	15	2
Saint Mary's University	Huskies	Halifax	NS	1956	Steve Sumarah	7,586	$52.9M	Huskies Stadium	2,000	24	3
Saint Francis Xavier University	X-Men	Antigonish	NS	1954	Gary Waterman	5,158	$100M	StFX Stadium	4,000	16	1

=== Canada West Universities Athletic Association ===
Institution	Team	City	Province	Founded	Head coach	Enrollment	Endowment	Football stadium	Capacity	Hardy Trophies	Vanier Cups
University of British Columbia	Thunderbirds	Vancouver	BC	1923	Blake Nill	49,166	$1.3B	Thunderbird Stadium	3,500	17	4
University of Calgary	Dinos	Calgary	AB	1964	Ryan Sheahan	30,900	$790.6M	McMahon Stadium	35,650	18	5
University of Alberta	Golden Bears	Edmonton	AB	1910	Stevenson Bone	39,312	$1.0B	Foote Field	3,500	18	3
University of Saskatchewan	Huskies	Saskatoon	SK	1912	Scott Flory	21,168	$214M	Griffiths Stadium	6,171	21	3
University of Regina	Rams	Regina	SK	1999	Mark McConkey	12,270	$25.9M	Mosaic Stadium	33,350	2	0
University of Manitoba	Bisons	Winnipeg	MB	1920	Stan Pierre	28,335	$424M	Princess Auto Stadium	33,422	12	3

=== Ontario University Athletics ===
Institution	Team	City	Province	Founded	Head coach	Enrollment	Endowment	Football stadium	Capacity	Yates Cups	Vanier Cups
University of Windsor	Lancers	Windsor	ON	1968	Jean-Paul Circelli	13,610	$110.8M	South Campus Stadium	2,000	1	0
University of Western Ontario	Mustangs	London	ON	1929	Michael Faulds	35,952	$685M	Western Alumni Stadium	8,000	35	8
University of Waterloo	Warriors	Waterloo	ON	1957	Chris Bertoia	31,362	$311.2M	Warrior Field	1,700	2	0
Wilfrid Laurier University	Golden Hawks	Waterloo	ON	1961	Todd Galloway	20,151	$71.6M	University Stadium	6,000	9	2
University of Guelph	Gryphons	Guelph	ON	1950	Mark Surya	27,048	$308.9M	Alumni Stadium	4,100	4	1
McMaster University	Marauders	Hamilton	ON	1901	Stefan Ptaszek	29,411	$609M	Ron Joyce Stadium	6,000	8	1
University of Toronto	Varsity Blues	Toronto	ON	1877	Darrell Adams	73,185	$1.88B	Varsity Stadium	5,000	25	2
York University	Lions	Toronto	ON	1969	Dexter Janke	55,000	$439M	York Lions Stadium	4,000	0	0
Queen's University	Gaels	Kingston	ON	1882	Steve Snyder	24,582	$1.04B	Richardson Stadium	8,000	23	4
University of Ottawa	Gee-Gees	Ottawa	ON	1881	Marcel Bellefeuille	42,587	$233.9M	Gee-Gees Field	4,152	4	2
Carleton University	Ravens	Ottawa	ON	1945	Corey Grant	31,202	$270.6M	TAAG Park	3,500	0	0

=== Réseau du sport étudiant du Québec ===
Institution	Team	City	Province	Founded	Head coach	Enrollment	Endowment	Football stadium	Capacity	Dunsmore Cups	Vanier Cups
Bishop's University	Gaiters	Sherbrooke	QC	1884	Chérif Nicolas	1,817	$32.5M	Coulter Field	2,200	4	0
Concordia University	Stingers	Montreal	QC	1974	Brad Collinson	38,809	$136.7M	Concordia Stadium	4,000	3	0
Université de Montréal	Carabins	Montreal	QC	2002	Marco Iadeluca	55,540	$276.5M	CEPSUM	5,100	6	3
McGill University	Redbirds	Montreal	QC	1898	Alex Surprenant	39,497	$1.45B	Molson Stadium	20,025	3	1
Université Laval	Rouge et Or	Quebec City	QC	1996		37,591	$108.3M	Stade Telus	12,817	17	12
Université de Sherbrooke	Vert et Or	Sherbrooke	QC	1971	Kevin Régimbald	35,000	---	Stade de l'Université de Sherbrooke	3,359	0	0

== Expansion ==
There have been efforts at establishing new varsity football programs at institutions that currently do not have teams. A group of alumni from Carleton University in Ottawa successfully revived that school's program which returned in 2013. The team is a member of the Ontario University Athletics conference of U Sports, returning football to Carleton University after a 15-year absence.

The Université de Moncton investigated a possible football program in 2011, due to the construction of Moncton Stadium in 2010. In May 2011, the athletics department submitted a feasibility report to the school's president and are based part of their decision upon how the fans in Moncton received the Uteck Bowl in 2011. The 2011 Uteck Bowl was not well supported in Moncton, and there has been little support for a team since.

The University of Quebec at Trois-Rivières explored the possibility of adding a football program with the launch planned for the 2017 season. The program would have been similar to Carleton University's in that there would be private funding from football alumni, but operated by shareholders. As of April 2015, $800,000 of the required $3 million had been raised in support of the varsity sport at UQTR. The capacity of the football stadium would then be increased from 2000 to 6270 seats. However, the UQTR Board of Regents refused to commit to the proposal. The UQTR Patriotes previously fielded a senior varsity team from 1971 to 1973 and 1977 to 1979.

=== Amateur teams ===
==== Club football ====
The Atlantic Football League, a club football league, currently features three non-varsity university teams; there is hope this may lead to varsity teams featured at some of these schools.

==== Junior football ====
Following their successful application to become full members of the Canada West Universities Athletic Association, the UBC Okanagan Heat explored the feasibility of starting their own football program, partnered with the Canadian Junior Football League's (CJFL) Okanagan Sun. UBCO would have partnered with the Sun in much the same way that the University of Regina was paired with the Prairie Football Conference's Regina Thunder. However, UBC-O lacks a stadium on campus; the Kelowna city-owned Apple Bowl stadium did not meet the guidelines required for entry into Canada West football after a conference site visit in 2014.

Two colleges additionally field varsity football teams in the CJFL: the St. Clair College's Saints and the Sault College's Cougars. However, as these schools are colleges and not universities: they can be members of the Canadian Collegiate Athletic Association but not U Sports.

=== Proposed interconference consortium ===
In February 2015, businessman David Dube (an alumnus and supporter of the Saskatchewan Huskies) and Jim Mullin announced a proposal for a consortium known as the "Northern 8", which would have organized interconference games between its member schools. Dube felt that this plan could have helped improve the prominence of CIS football on a national basis outside of the post-season (which, as of the 2014 season, was the only period of the season that featured nationally televised CIS games), as it would have allowed a nationally televised package of regular-season games to be sold to a major broadcaster. The Northern 8 would have been structured as a non-profit corporation and would have subsidized production costs for its telecasts: profits would have been distributed to non-member schools. It would have started with eight teams but could have expanded to 10. The Canada West conference backed the proposal. The OUA, RSEQ and AUS showed concerns for the plan due to travel costs and their effects on standings and rejected the plan.

== Awards ==
- The Hec Crighton Trophy is awarded to U Sports most outstanding player.
- The Russ Jackson Award is presented to the player best exemplifying the attributes of academic achievement, football skill, and citizenship.
- The Presidents' Trophy (U Sports) is presented to the Most Outstanding Defensive Player.
- The Peter Gorman Trophy is awarded to the Rookie of the Year.
- The J. P. Metras Trophy is awarded annually to the Most Outstanding Down Lineman.
- The Frank Tindall Trophy is awarded to the Coach of the Year.
- The Jeff Russel Memorial Trophy is awarded to the Most Outstanding Player from the RESQ.

Additionally, the players deemed to be the best at each position are named to the annual All-Canadian Football Team as first or second team players.

== Professional advancement ==
=== U Sports players in the CFL ===
Many players from U Sports football have become professional athletes with most of them playing in the Canadian Football League. Opening Day of the 2015 CFL season saw a record 199 U Sports football players on rosters around the League. In 2022, 205 former U Sports football players were featured on CFL teams' rosters on opening day.

=== CFL draft ===
The following is a list of recent numbers from the CFL draft, which is an annual eight-round event with a current maximum of 74 players drafted. From 1997 to 2012 the CFL Draft had six rounds of selections and from 2013 to 2015 it had seven rounds. From 2002 to 2005, the CFL had nine teams, then reverted to eight teams from 2006 to 2013, and then was back to its current number of nine teams in 2014. The high-water mark of 60 players from the U Sports drafted was recorded in the 2022 CFL draft, which was the most since 1978.

Year	Picks	U Picks	1st Rnd	Highest	Position	School
2005	53	33	5	Miguel Robede	DE	Laval Rouge et Or
2006	50	26	5	Jay Pottinger	LB	McMaster Marauders
2007	47	31	5	Chris Bauman	WR	Regina Rams
2008	48	33	4	Dylan Barker	DB	Saskatchewan Huskies
2009	48	38	7	Simeon Rottier	OT	Alberta Golden Bears
2010	47	36	4	Shomari Williams	LB	Queen's Gaels
2011	47	34	4	Henoc Muamba	LB	St. Francis Xavier X-Men
2012	45	24	3	Ben Heenan	OL	Saskatchewan Huskies
2013	60	44	4	Linden Gaydosh	DT	Calgary Dinos
2014	65	59	8	Pierre Lavertu	OL	Laval Rouge et Or
2015	62	44	7	Sukh Chungh	OL	Calgary Dinos
2016	70	53	4	Philippe Gagnon	OL	Laval Rouge et Or
2017	71	56	6	Daniel Vandervoort	WR	McMaster Marauders
2018	69	56	4	Mark Korte	OL	Alberta Golden Bears
2019	73	52	2	Jesse Gibbon	OL	Waterloo Warriors
2020	73	57	4	Coulter Woodmansey	OL	Guelph Gryphons
2021	54	31	4	Nelson Lokombo	DB	Saskatchewan Huskies
2022	74	60	6	Zach Pelehos	OL	Ottawa Gee-Gees
2023	72	57	4	Michael Brodrique	LB	Montreal Carabins
2024	74	47	4	Benjamin Labrosse	LB	McGill Redbirds
2025	72	49	2	Devin Veresuk	LB	Windsor Lancers
2026	74	45	1	Niklas Henning	OL	Queen's Gaels

=== NFL draft ===
There have been 16 U Sports players drafted into the National Football League with Giovanni Manu being the most recent.

Year	Round	Pick	NFL team	Player	Position	School
1976	8	234	Washington Redskins	Brian Fryer	WR	Alberta Golden Bears
1979	11	280	Baltimore Colts	John Priestner	LB	Western Mustangs
1982	12	333	Cincinnati Bengals	Dan Feraday	QB	Toronto Varsity Blues
1986	1	23	Los Angeles Rams	Mike Schad	OG	Queen's Golden Gaels
1992	9	239	Phoenix Cardinals	Tyrone Williams	WR	Western Mustangs
1995	7	237	San Diego Chargers	Mark Montreuil	CB	Concordia Stingers
1998	2	32	Indianapolis Colts	Jerome Pathon	WR	Acadia Axemen
2001	7	241	Jacksonville Jaguars	Randy Chevrier	DE	McGill Redmen (Note: Nicknamed Redbirds since November 2020.)
2009	4	113	San Diego Chargers	Vaughn Martin	DE	Western Mustangs
2012	3	89	New Orleans Saints	Akiem Hicks	DE	Regina Rams
2014	6	200	Kansas City Chiefs	Laurent Duvernay-Tardif	OT	McGill Redmen
2016	4	120	New Orleans Saints	David Onyemata	DL	Manitoba Bisons
2022	7	236	Los Angeles Chargers	Deane Leonard	CB	Calgary Dinos
2023	4	124	Baltimore Ravens	Tavius Robinson	LB	Guelph Gryphons
2024	3	71	Arizona Cardinals	Isaiah Adams	OG	Wilfrid Laurier Golden Hawks
2024	4	126	Detroit Lions	Giovanni Manu	OL	British Columbia

=== U Sports players in the NFL ===
As of 2025, U Sports had produced 44 players who have played in an NFL regular season game:

- 1924 Joe Kraker, Saskatchewan, OG/OT.
- 1944 Les Lear, Manitoba, OG/OT.
- 1945 Joe Krol, Western Ontario, K/RB.
- 1960 Bill Crawford, UBC, OG.
- 1965 Jim Young, Queen's, RB/R.
- 1976 Brian Fryer, Alberta, R.
- 1979 Ken Clark, Saint Mary's, P.
- 1986 Mike Schad, Queen's, OG.
- 1987 Brian Belway, Calgary, DE.
- 1987 Dave Sparenberg, Western Ontario, OG.
- 1987 Brant Bengen, UBC and Idaho, WR.
- 1988 Dean Dorsey, Toronto, K.
- 1992 Tyrone Williams, Western Ontario, WR.
- 1995 Tim Tindale, Western Ontario, RB.
- 1995 Mark Montreuil, Concordia, CB.
- 1998 Jerome Pathon, Acadia & U. of Washington, R.
- 2000 J. P. Darche, McGill, LS/LB.
- 2001 Randy Chevrier, McGill, LS/DE.
- 2003 Israel Idonije, Manitoba, DL.
- 2004 Steve Morley, Saint Mary's, OG/OT.
- 2006 Daniel Federkeil, Calgary, DE.
- 2006 Jon Ryan, Regina, K.
- 2008 Samuel Giguère, Sherbrooke, WR
- 2009 Vaughn Martin, Western Ontario, DL.
- 2010 Cory Greenwood, Concordia, LB
- 2012 Akiem Hicks, Regina, DT
- 2013 Stefan Charles, Regina, DT
- 2014 Henoc Muamba, St.FX, LB
- 2014 David Foucault, Montreal, OL
- 2014 Laurent Duvernay-Tardif, McGill, OL
- 2015 Brett Jones, Regina, C
- 2015 Tyler Varga, Western Ontario, RB
- 2016 David Onyemata, Manitoba, DL
- 2017 Antony Auclair, Laval, TE
- 2019 Tevaughn Campbell, Regina, DB
- 2020 Dakoda Shepley, UBC, C
- 2021 Lirim Hajrullahu, Western, PK
- 2022 Deane Leonard, Calgary, CB
- 2022 Nikola Kalinic, York, TE/FB
- 2023 Tavius Robinson, Guelph, LB
- 2023 Carter O'Donnell, Alberta, OL
- 2024 Isaiah Adams, Laurier, OG
- 2025 Giovanni Manu, UBC, OT
- 2025 Theo Benedet, UBC, OT

== See also ==
- Canadian Collegiate Athletic Association
- Canadian Junior Football League
- CEGEP
- College football
- Comparison of American and Canadian football
- Football Canada
- List of Canadian football stadiums by capacity
- Quebec Junior Football League
