= Frank Tindall Trophy =

Canadian football award

The Frank Tindall Trophy is presented to the U Sports Football Coach of the Year. The award is dedicated in honour of Frank Tindall, a former U Sports head coach of the Queen's Golden Gaels (29 years, 106-74-2, 8 league and 1 national title). The Selection Committee is composed of members of the Carleton University Old Crow Society.

== List of Frank Tindall Trophy winners ==
Year	Winner	School
1969	Henry Janzen	Manitoba Bisons
1970	Frank Cosentino	Western Ontario Mustangs
1971	Jim Donlevy	Alberta Golden Bears
1972	Tuffy Knight	Wilfrid Laurier Golden Hawks
1973	Ed Hilton	UPEI Panthers
1974	Ron Murphy	Toronto Varsity Blues
1975	Don Gilbert	Ottawa Gee-Gees
1976	Darwin Semotiuk	Western Ontario Mustangs
1977	Peter Connellan	Calgary Dinos
1978	Frank Smith	UBC Thunderbirds
1979	Tuffy Knight	Wilfrid Laurier Golden Hawks
1980	Cam Innes	Ottawa Gee-Gees
1981	John Huard	Acadia Axemen
1982	Bernie Custis	McMaster Marauders
1983	Doug Hargreaves	Queen's Golden Gaels
1984	Steve Bruno	Mount Allison Mounties
1985	Peter Connellan	Calgary Dinos
1986	Bruce Coulter	Bishop's Gaiters
1987	Frank Smith	UBC Thunderbirds
1988	Larry Uteck	Saint Mary's Huskies
1989	Tuffy Knight	Waterloo Warriors
1990	Larry Haylor	Western Ontario Mustangs
1991	Rich Newbrough	Wilfrid Laurier Golden Hawks
1992	Ian Breck	Bishop's Gaiters
1993	Larry Uteck	Saint Mary's Huskies
1994	Brian Towriss	Saskatchewan Huskies
1995	Rick Zmich	Wilfrid Laurier Golden Hawks
1996	Dan McNally	Guelph Gryphons
1997	John Stevens	St. Francis Xavier X-Men
1998	Larry Haylor	Western Ontario Mustangs
1999	Blake Nill	Saint Mary's Huskies
2000	Greg Marshall	McMaster Marauders
2001	Brian Dobie	Manitoba Bisons
2002	Chuck McMann	McGill Redmen
2003	Gary Jeffries	Wilfrid Laurier Golden Hawks
2004	Jerry Friesen	Alberta Golden Bears
2005	Glen Constantin	Laval Rouge et Or
2006	Denis Piché	Ottawa Gee-Gees
2007	Frank McCrystal	Regina Rams
2008	Pat Sheahan	Queen's Golden Gaels
2009	Steve Sumarah	Saint Mary's Huskies
2010	Glen Constantin	Laval Rouge et Or
2011	Jeff Cummins	Acadia Axemen
2012	Stefan Ptaszek	McMaster Marauders
2013	Kevin Mackey	Bishop's Gaiters
2014	Kelly Jeffrey	Mount Allison Mounties
2015	Wayne Harris, Jr.	Calgary Dinos
2016	Michael Faulds	Wilfrid Laurier Golden Hawks
2017	Jeff Cummins	Acadia Axemen
2018	Greg Marshall	Western Ontario Mustangs
2019	Greg Marshall	Western Ontario Mustangs
2021	Steve Snyder	Queen's Gaels
2022	Gary Waterman	St. Francis Xavier X-Men
2023	Chris Morris	Alberta Golden Bears
2024	Michael Faulds	Wilfrid Laurier Golden Hawks
2025	Michael Faulds	Wilfrid Laurier Golden Hawks

== See also ==
- Hec Crighton Trophy
- J. P. Metras Trophy
- Presidents' Trophy
- Peter Gorman Trophy
- Russ Jackson Award
