= Steve Sumarah =

Canadian gridiron football coach

Current position
- Title: Head coach
- Team: Saint Mary's

Biographical details
- Born: Halifax, Nova Scotia
- Education: St. Francis Xavier; Saint Mary's

Playing career
- –: St. Francis Xavier

Coaching career (HC unless noted)
- 1998–2005: Saint Mary's (OC)
- 2006–2011: Saint Mary's
- 2012–2021: Carleton
- 2022: UBC (OC)
- 2022–present: Saint Mary's

Accomplishments and honors

Awards
- 2× Vanier Cup champion (2001, 2002); CIS Coach of the Year (2009); IFAF U19 World Championship (2018)

Steven Sumarah is the head coach of the Saint Mary's Huskies of U Sports football. He has also been the head coach of the Canada National Junior Football Team since 2016. As the head coach, he led Team Canada to a IFAF World Junior Championship in 2018 with a 139–7 win over Team Mexico in Mexico City.

== Coaching career ==
After serving as offensive coordinator for the Saint Mary's Huskies for eight seasons, Sumarah was promoted to head coach of the program in 2006. He led the team to four straight Loney Bowl championships including an appearance in the 2007 Vanier Cup game. He was named coach of the year in 2009.

After his dismissal from the Huskies, he was hired on January 16, 2012 to become the head coach of the Carleton Ravens, who began play in 2013. He was the head coach of the Ravens for eight seasons where he had a record of 29–33 before being dismissed on January 12, 2022.

On February 2, 2022, it was announced that Sumarah had been hired as the offensive coordinator for the UBC Thunderbirds, reuniting him with former Huskies head coach, Blake Nill. However, following the resignation of Saint Mary's Huskies' head coach James Colzie III in April 2022, Sumarah was hired to return to the Huskies football program as the team's head coach on June 8, 2022.

== Personal life ==
Sumarah lives in Halifax with his wife, Amanda Hardiman, and has one daughter, Brooke, and two stepchildren, Ryan and Brianna.
