= Saint Mary's Huskies football =

Canadian university football team

Saint Mary's Huskies
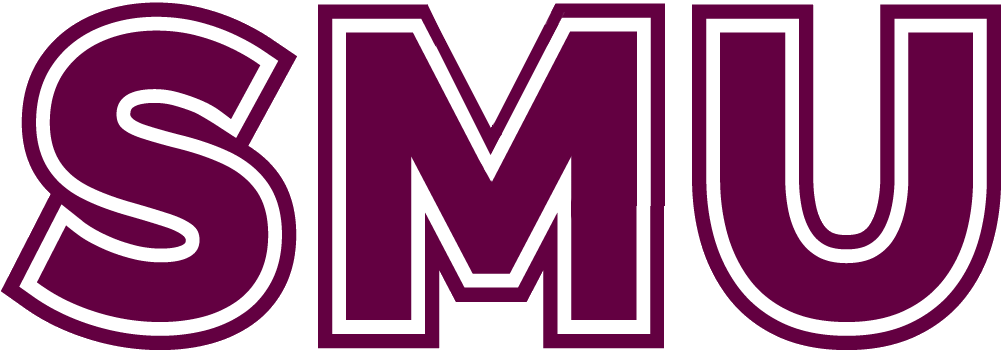
- Saint Mary's Huskies logo
- First season: 1956; 70 years ago
- Athletic director: Scott Gray
- Head coach: Steve Sumarah; 12th year, 59–27 (.686)
- Other staff: Scott Annand (assistant head coach, defensive line) Gavin Lake (defensive coordinator) Mark Nelson (special teams coordinator, linebackers)
- Home stadium: Huskies Stadium
- Year built: 1970
- Stadium capacity: 1100
- Stadium surface: FieldTurf
- Location: Halifax, Nova Scotia
- League: U Sports
- Conference: AUS (1999 - present)
- Past associations: AUAA (1974-1998)
- All-time record: 264–163 (.618)
- Postseason record: –

Titles
- Vanier Cups: 3; 1973, 2001, 2002
- Uteck Bowls: 2; 2003, 2007
- Churchill Bowls: 1; 2002
- Atlantic Bowls: 7; 1964, 1973, 1988, 1990, 1992, 1999, 2001
- Jewett Trophies: 26; 1964, 1965, 1968, 1971, 1972, 1973, 1974, 1987, 1988, 1989, 1990, 1992, 1993, 1994, 1999, 2000, 2001, 2002, 2003, 2004, 2007, 2008, 2009, 2010, 2025, 2026
- Hec Crighton winners: 4 Chris Flynn (3), Erik Glavic
- Colours: Maroon, White, and Black
- Outfitter: Adidas
- Website: smuhuskies.ca/football

The Saint Mary's Huskies football team represents Saint Mary's University in Halifax, Nova Scotia in the sport of Canadian football in U Sports. The Huskies have been the most successful in the Atlantic University Sport (AUS) conference of U Sports football, reaching the Vanier Cup championship game nine times and winning three times (1973, 2001, 2002), both marks being the highest in the AUS. The program also has the most Jewett Trophy conference championships, winning 25 times in 34 appearances.

The Huskies became the third university to win back-to-back championships (2001 & 2002) and the first of three universities to appear in at least three consecutive championship tournaments (2001–2003). The second being the Saskatchewan Huskies (2004–2006) and the third being the Laval Rouge et Or (2010–2013). As of 2024, the Huskies are the last AUS team to have both appeared in a Vanier Cup (2007) and to have won a Vanier Cup (2002).

The Hec Crighton Trophy was awarded four times to Saint Mary's Huskies players; three times to Chris Flynn (1988, 1989, 1990) and once to Erik Glavic in 2007. Flynn is the only player to have won the league MVP award three times and in 2011, he became the first player inducted into the Canadian Football Hall of Fame based solely on a university career.

== Recent coaching history ==
Steve Sumarah was the head coach of the Huskies for six seasons from 2006 to 2011 and had his teams achieve four first-place finishes, along with one Vanier Cup appearance in 2007. He was fired on Dec. 5, 2011. Perry Marchese was hired as his replacement on February 17, 2012. Marchese had a record of 8-24 over four seasons and was replaced with James Colzie III in 2016. Colzie led the Huskies to an 17-20 record over five seasons and resigned from the Huskies in April 2022. Sumarah returned as head coach on June 8, 2022.

== Season results since 1998 ==
Season	Games	Won	Lost	OTL	PCT	PF	PA	Standing	Playoffs
1998	8	4	4	0	0.500	153	161	3rd in AUAA	Out of playoffs
1999	8	7	1	0	0.875	276	131	1st in AUS	Defeated Acadia Axemen in Loney Bowl 25-24; Defeated Waterloo Warriors in Atlantic Bowl 21-14; Lost to Laval Rouge et Or in 35th Vanier Cup 14-10
2000	8	8	0	0	1.000	324	66	1st in AUS	Defeated Acadia Axemen in Loney Bowl 38-18; Lost to Regina Rams in Atlantic Bowl 40-36
2001	8	8	0	0	1.000	480	35	1st in AUS	Defeated Acadia Axemen in Loney Bowl 38-7; Defeated Laval Rouge et Or in Atlantic Bowl 48-8; Defeated Manitoba Bisons in 37th Vanier Cup 42-16
2002	8	6	2	0	0.750	313	110	1st in AUS	Defeated St. Francis Xavier X-Men in Loney Bowl 63-14; Defeated McMaster Marauders in Churchill Bowl 36-25; Defeated Saskatchewan Huskies in 38th Vanier Cup 33-21
2003	8	7	1	0	0.875	338	128	1st in AUS	Defeated St. Francis Xavier X-Men in Loney Bowl 36-12; Defeated Simon Fraser Clan in Uteck Bowl 60-9; Lost to Laval Rouge et Or in 39th Vanier Cup 14-7
2004	8	5	3	0	0.625	215	131	1st in AUS	Defeated Acadia Axemen in Loney Bowl 24-7; Lost to Saskatchewan Huskies in Mitchell Bowl 31-16
2005	8	4	4	0	0.500	225	175	3rd in AUS	Lost to St. Francis Xavier X-Men in semi-final 47-29
2006	8	4	4	–	0.500	189	130	2nd in AUS	Defeated St. Francis Xavier X-Men in semi-final 24-6; Lost to Acadia Axemen in Loney Bowl 32-24
2007	8	7	1	–	0.875	352	171	1st in AUS	Defeated St. Francis Xavier X-Men in Loney Bowl 25-24; Defeated Laval Rouge et Or in Uteck Bowl 24-2; Lost to Manitoba Bisons in 43rd Vanier Cup
2008	8	7	1	–	0.875	259	168	1st in AUS	Defeated St. Francis Xavier X-Men in Loney Bowl 29-27; Lost to Western Ontario Mustangs in Mitchell Bowl 28-12
2009	8	7	1	–	0.875	266	119	1st in AUS	Defeated St. Francis Xavier X-Men in Loney Bowl 31-22; Lost to Calgary Dinos in Uteck Bowl 38-14
2010	8	5	3	–	0.625	228	124	1st in AUS	Defeated Acadia Axemen in Loney Bowl 37-8; Lost to Calgary Dinos in Mitchell Bowl 35-8
2011	8	6	2	–	0.750	296	130	2nd in AUS	Defeated St. Francis Xavier X-Men in semi-final 25-2; Lost to Acadia Axemen in Loney Bowl 39-20
2012	8	3	5	–	0.375	189	126	2nd in AUS	Defeated Mount Allison Mounties in semi-final 49-11; Lost to Acadia Axemen in Loney Bowl 17-9
2013	8	5	3	–	0.625	128	134	2nd in AUS	Lost to Mount Allison Mounties in Loney Bowl 20-17
2014	8	0	8	–	0.000	59	282	4th in AUS	Out of playoffs
2015	8	0	8	–	0.000	72	281	4th in AUS	Out of playoffs
2016	8	2	6	–	0.250	126	239	4th in AUS	Out of playoffs
2017	8	5	3	–	0.625	209	149	2nd in AUS	Defeated St. Francis Xavier X-Men in semi-final 16-15; Lost to Acadia Axemen in Loney Bowl 45-38
2018	8	7	1	–	0.875	188	141	1st in AUS	Lost to St. Francis Xavier X-Men in Loney Bowl 33-9
2019	8	3	5	–	0.375	159	190	4th in AUS	Out of playoffs
2020	Season cancelled due to COVID-19 pandemic								
2021	6	1	5	–	0.167	58	131	5th in AUS	Out of playoffs
2022^{[A]}	7	3	4	–	0.429	116	159	4th in AUS	Out of playoffs
2023	8	2	6	–	0.250	115	252	4th in AUS	Lost to St. Francis Xavier X-Men in semi-final 36-20
2024	8	4	4	–	0.500	177	150	3rd in AUS	Defeated St. Francis Xavier X-Men in semi-final 21-17; Lost to Bishop's Gaiters in Loney Bowl 25-22 (3OT)
2025	8	7	1	–	0.875	278	69	1st in AUS	Defeated Acadia Axemen in semi-final 37-0; Defeated St. Francis Xavier X-Men in Loney Bowl 46-11; Lost to Montreal Carabins in Uteck Bowl 49-19
2026	8	8	0	–	1.000	229	98	1st in AUS	Defeated St. Francis Xavier X-Men in Loney Bowl 28-15; Lost to Western Ontario Mustangs in Mitchell Bowl 64-14

A. The September 24, 2022 Bishop's at Saint Mary's game was cancelled due to weather and the October 29, 2022 Saint Mary's at Bishop's game was worth four points with both teams playing seven games in 2022.

== Head coaches ==
Name	Years	Notes
Elmer MacGillivray	1956	
No team	1957	
Bob Hayes	1958–1969	
Al Keith	1970–1975	
Jim Clark	1976–1978	
Al Keith	1979–1982	
Larry Uteck	1983–1997	
Blake Nill	1998–2005	
Steve Sumarah	2006–2011	
Perry Marchese	2012–2015	
James Colzie III	2016–2021	
Steve Sumarah	2022–present	

== Championships ==
=== National Championships ===
==== Vanier Cup ====
- Champions: 1973, 2001, 2002
- Runner-up: 1988, 1990, 1992, 1999, 2003, 2007

=== Semi-final championships ===
==== Uteck Bowl ====
- Champions: 2003, 2007
- Runner-up: 2009, 2025

==== Mitchell Bowl ====
- Runner-up: 2004, 2008, 2010, 2026

==== Churchill Bowl ====
- Champions: 2002

==== Atlantic Bowl ====
- Champions: 1964, 1973, 1988, 1990, 1992, 1999, 2001
- Runner-up: 1968, 1971, 1972, 1974, 1987, 1989, 1993, 1994, 2000

=== Conference Championships ===
==== Loney Bowl ====
The Huskies have also been victorious in the Loney Bowl Conference Championship a record 26 times with their last coming in the 2026 season.

== National award winners ==
- Hec Crighton Trophy: Chris Flynn (1988, 1989, 1990), Erik Glavic (2007)
- J. P. Metras Trophy: Mark Pothier (1975)
- Presidents' Trophy: Alex Eliopoulos (1992), Jonathan Langa (2014)
- Russ Jackson Award: David Sykes (1992, 1993), Ted MacLean (1995), Duncan Patterson (2022)
- Frank Tindall Trophy: Larry Uteck (1988, 1993), Blake Nill (1999), Steve Sumarah (2009)

== Huskies in the CFL ==
As of the start of the 2026 CFL season, four former Huskies players are on CFL teams' rosters:

- Aaron Crawford, Saskatchewan Roughriders
- Adrian Greene, Calgary Stampeders
- Aidan John, Ottawa Redblacks
- Brett Lauther, Ottawa Redblacks
