= St. Francis Xavier X-Men football =

University Canadian football team

St. Francis Xavier X-Men
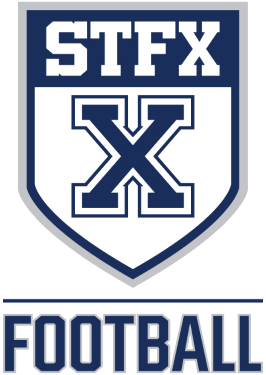
- St. Francis Xavier X-Men logo
- First season: 1954; 72 years ago
- Athletic director: Leo MacPherson
- Head coach: Gary Waterman; 16th year, 79–55–0 (.590)
- Home stadium: StFX Stadium
- Stadium capacity: 4000
- Stadium surface: FieldTurf
- Location: Antigonish, Nova Scotia
- League: U Sports
- Conference: AUS (1999 – present)
- Past associations: AUAA (1974–1998)
- All-time record: –
- Postseason record: –

Titles
- Vanier Cups: 1; 1966
- Atlantic Bowls: 5; 1959, 1960, 1961, 1963, 1996
- Jewett Trophies: 16; 1960, 1961, 1962, 1963, 1966, 1967, 1978, 1982, 1983, 1996, 2015, 2016, 2018, 2021, 2022, 2023
- Hec Crighton winners: 0
- Colours: Blue and White
- Outfitter: Adidas
- Website: goxgo.ca/football

The St. Francis Xavier X-Men football team represents the St. Francis Xavier University in Antigonish, Nova Scotia, in the sport of Canadian football in U Sports. The X-Men program has been competing at the varsity level since 1954 and won the second ever Vanier Cup national championship in 1966. The team has played in two National Championship games overall when they were runners-up in 1996 and have won 16 conference championships in total.

== Championships ==
=== National championships ===
==== Vanier Cup ====
- Champions: 1966
- Runner-Up: 1996

=== Semi-final championships ===
==== Atlantic Bowl ====
- Champions: 1959, 1960, 1961, 1963, 1996
- Runner-Up: 1958, 1962, 1967, 1978, 1982, 1983
- In 1983 the AUAA was in a dispute with the CIS (formerly CIAU) over the Atlantic Bowl being played at Saint Mary's, in Halifax, on annual basis. Calgary received a bye to the CIAU Championship game.

==== Uteck Bowl ====
- Runner-Up: 2015, 2018, 2022

==== Mitchell Bowl ====
- Runner-Up: 2016, 2021, 2023

=== Conference championships ===
==== Jewett Trophy (Loney Bowl) ====
- Champions: 1960, 1961, 1962, 1963, 1966, 1967, 1978, 1982, 1983, 1996, 2015, 2016, 2018, 2021, 2022, 2023

The X-Men have won the Atlantic Conference Championship 16 times and have been runners-up an additional 12 times.

== Recent results ==
Season	Games	Won	Lost	OTL	PCT	PF	PA	Standing	Playoffs
1996	8	6	2	0	0.750	227	147	1st in AUS	Defeated Mount Allison Mounties in Loney Bowl 30–22; Defeated Ottawa Gee-Gees in Atlantic Bowl 13–5; Lost to Saskatchewan Huskies in 32nd Vanier Cup 31–12
1997	8	7	1	0	0.875	190	120	1st in AUS	Lost to Mount Allison Mounties in Loney Bowl 20–17
1998	8	1	7	0	0.125	112	219	4th in AUS	Out of playoffs
1999	8	1	7	0	0.125	132	270	4th in AUS	Out of playoffs
2000	8	3	5	0	0.375	65	228	3rd in AUS	Out of playoffs
2001	8	3	5	0	0.375	106	202	3rd in AUS	Out of playoffs
2002	8	6	2	0	0.750	215	134	2nd in AUS	Defeated Acadia Axemen in semi-final 25–11; Lost to Saint Mary's Huskies in Loney Bowl 63–14
2003	8	4	4	0	0.500	139	143	3rd in AUS	Defeated Acadia Axemen in semi-final 30–28; Lost to Saint Mary's Huskies in Loney Bowl 36–12
2004	8	3	5	0	0.375	155	245	3rd in AUS	Lost to Acadia Axemen in semi-final 15–8
2005	8	5	3	0	0.625	219	189	2nd in AUS	Defeated Saint Mary's Huskies in semi-final 47–29; Lost to Acadia Axemen in Loney Bowl 69–6
2006	7	2	5	–	0.286	80	176	3rd in AUS	Lost to Saint Mary's Huskies in semi-final 24–6
2007	8	3	5	–	0.375	158	284	2nd in AUS	Defeated Acadia Axemen in semi-final 38–17; Lost to Saint Mary's Huskies in Loney Bowl 25–24
2008	8	4	4	–	0.500	186	205	2nd in AUS	Defeated Mount Allison Mounties in semi-final 52–12; Lost to Saint Mary's Huskies in Loney Bowl 29–27
2009	8	6	2	–	0.750	201	166	2nd in AUS	Defeated Acadia Axemen in semi-final 33–30; Lost to Saint Mary's Huskies in Loney Bowl 31–22
2010	8	1	7	–	0.125	98	247	4th in AUS	Out of playoffs
2011	8	2	6	–	0.250	148	300	3rd in AUS	Lost to Saint Mary's Huskies in semi-final 25–2
2012	8	2	6	–	0.250	137	239	4th in AUS	Out of playoffs
2013	8	3	5	–	0.375	150	183	4th in AUS	Out of playoffs
2014	8	4	4	–	0.500	181	180	2nd in AUS	Defeated Acadia Axemen in semi-final 18–17; Lost to Mount Allison Mounties in Loney Bowl 29–7
2015	8	5	3	–	0.625	172	179	2nd in AUS	Defeated Acadia Axemen in semi-final 26–4; Defeated Mount Allison Mounties in Loney Bowl 14–12; Lost to UBC Thunderbirds in Uteck Bowl 36–9
2016	8	7	1	–	0.875	299	129	1st in AUS	Defeated Mount Allison Mounties in Loney Bowl 29–8; Lost to Calgary Dinos in Mitchell Bowl 50–24
2017	8	4	4	–	0.500	179	168	3rd in AUS	Lost to Saint Mary's Huskies in semi-final 16–15
2018	8	6	2	–	0.750	224	156	2nd in AUS	Defeated Acadia Axemen in semi-final 33–10; Defeated Saint Mary's Huskies in Loney Bowl 33–9; Lost to Laval Rouge et Or in Uteck Bowl 63–0
2019	8	2	6	–	0.250	128	214	5th in AUS	Out of playoffs
2020	Season cancelled due to COVID-19 pandemic								
2021	6	6	0	–	1.000	193	99	1st in AUS	Defeated Acadia Axemen in semi-final 27–22; Defeated Bishop's Gaiters in Loney Bowl 25–17; Lost to Western Mustangs in Mitchell Bowl 61–6
2022	8	8	0	–	1.000	261	83	1st in AUS	Defeated Mount Allison Mounties in Loney Bowl 21–14; Lost to Saskatchewan Huskies in Uteck Bowl 36–19
2023	8	8	0	–	1.000	267	90	1st in AUS	Defeated St. Mary's Huskies in semi-final 36–20; Defeated Bishop's Gaiters in Loney Bowl 34–23; Lost to UBC Thunderbirds in Mitchell Bowl 47–17
2024	8	5	3	–	0.625	240	155	2nd in AUS	Lost to Saint Mary's Huskies in semi-final 21–17
2025	8	5	3	–	0.625	187	109	2nd in AUS	Defeated Bishop's Gaiters in semi-final 26–24; Lost to Saint Mary's Huskies in Loney Bowl 46–11
2026	8	5	3	–	0.625	239	152	2nd in AUS	Defeated Acadia Axemen in semi-final 48–17; Lost to Saint Mary's Huskies in Loney Bowl 28–15

== National postseason results ==
Vanier Cup Era (1965-Present)
Year	Game	Opponent	Result
1966	Vanier Cup	Waterloo Lutheran	W 40-14
1967	Atlantic Bowl	McMaster	L 0-7
1978	Atlantic Bowl	Queen's	L 10-32
1982	Atlantic Bowl	UBC	L 1-54
1996	Atlantic Bowl Vanier Cup	Ottawa Saskatchewan	W 13-5 L 12-31
2015	Uteck Bowl	UBC	L 9-36
2016	Mitchell Bowl	Calgary	L 24-50
2018	Uteck Bowl	Laval	L 0-63
2021	Mitchell Bowl	Western	L 6-61
2022	Uteck Bowl	Saskatchewan	L 19-36
2023	Uteck Bowl	UBC	L 17-47

St. Francis Xavier is 1–9 in semi-final games and 1–1 in the Vanier Cup.

== Head coaches ==
Name	Years	Notes
Frank Germann	1954–1956	
Don Loney	1957–1973	
Cam Innes	1974–1977	
John Musselman	1978–1983	
Lance Bullock	1984–1988	
Mark Heidebrecht	1989–1992	
John Stevens	1993–2001	
Dennis McPhee	2002–2003	
John Bloomfield	2004–2008	
Gary Waterman	2009–present	

== National award winners ==
- J. P. Metras Trophy: Tony Grassa (1981), Mike Kushnir (1997)
- Presidents' Trophy: Paul Frlan (1995), Adam MacDonald (2002), Hénoc Muamba (2010)
- Peter Gorman Trophy: Joey Tynes (1979), Andre Arlain (1994), Paul Carty (1997), Jeremy Steeves (2001)
- Frank Tindall Trophy: John Stevens (1997), Gary Waterman (2022)

== X-Men in the CFL ==
In the 2011 CFL draft, Hénoc Muamba became the first X-Men player to be selected first overall in the Canadian College Draft, having been drafted by the Winnipeg Blue Bombers.

As of the start of the 2026 CFL season, three former X-Men players are on CFL teams' rosters:

- Kaion Julien-Grant, Edmonton Elks
- Gregor MacKellar, Ottawa Redblacks
- Gordon Whyte, Hamilton Tiger-Cats
