= Tommy Denison =

Canadian gridiron football player and coach (born 1978)

Louisiana-Monroe Warhawks
- Title: Analyst

Personal information
- Born: October 7, 1978 (age 48); Hamilton, Ontario, Canada
- Listed height: 6 ft 1 in (1.85 m)

Career information
- Position: Quarterback
- High school: Beamsville Secondary
- College: Graceland (1998); Mansfield (1999)
- CFL draft: 2002: undrafted

Career history

Playing
- 2004: Winnipeg Blue Bombers*
- 2004: Calgary Stampeders
- 2005: Toronto Argonauts*
- * Offseason or practice squad member only

Coaching
- 2017: Saint Mary's Huskies (OC)
- 2019: Toronto Varsity Blues (OC)
- 2020–2022: York Lions (OC)
- 2023–2024: Edmonton Elks (Offensive analyst)
- 2025: York Lions (Offensive assistant)
- 2026: Warhawks football (Offensive Analyst)

Awards and highlights
- 2× Hec Crighton Trophy winner (2002, 2003)

Tommy Denison (born October 7, 1978) is a former quarterback in Canadian Interuniversity Sport and a football coach. As a player, he is a two-time All-Canadian and two-time winner of the Hec Crighton Trophy in 2002 and 2003. He played professionally for the Winnipeg Blue Bombers, Calgary Stampeders, and Toronto Argonauts of the Canadian Football League (CFL).

== High school ==
Denison played his high school football at Beamsville District Secondary School, where he was a part of two Zone 4 championship football teams.

== Great Lakes Football League ==
Denison played for the Niagara Colts of the GLFL and set numerous records including an 836-yard passing performance against the Brantford Bisons that was recognized in Sports Illustrated's Faces in the Crowd. He threw for 6,700 yards and 68 touchdowns in the 1998 season.

== University career ==
Denison first attended Graceland College in 1998 where he was a member of the Graceland Yellowjackets. He then transferred to the Mansfield University of Pennsylvania in 1999, where he won the starting quarterback job midway through his redshirt freshman season. There he completed 68 of his 144 pass attempts for 735 yards with six touchdowns and ten interceptions.

=== Queen's University ===
In 2001, Dension returned to Canada and became a member of the Queen's Golden Gaels football team. In his first year, he initially split quarterbacking duties before starting the last four games of the regular season where he finished 6th nationally in passing yards with 1684 yards.

In 2002, Denison set new standards for quarterback play and aerial offense. He became the first CIS football quarterback to pass for more than 3,000 yards in a single season. His 3,001 passing yards surpassed the old record set by Greg Vavra of the Calgary Dinos in 1983. The Gaels finished the 2002 season with a 7–1 record where Denison had 183 completions out of 312 attempts with 22 passing touchdowns. He recorded the most yards passing in a single OUA game on November 2, 2002 against the Western Mustangs in the OUA semifinal with 561 yards, which remains a U Sports playoff record as of 2019. He took the team to the Yates Cup where the Golden Gaels lost to the McMaster Marauders. For his record-setting season, Denison was awarded the Hec Crighton Trophy, becoming the second Golden Gael to win the award.

Denison continued his dominant play in 2003 as he completed 203 of his 313 passing attempts for 2,907 yards with a then-OUA-record 24 passing touchdowns. The Golden Gaels once again finished second in the OUA with a 7–1 record, but lost to the Wilfrid Laurier Golden Hawks in the semi-final playoff game. Nonetheless, based on another outstanding season, Denison was awarded his second consecutive Hec Crighton MVP award, becoming the second CIS quarterback to ever win the award more than once (Chris Flynn won the award three times). He finished his three-year CIS career with 7,592 passing yards, which was eighth all-time in CIS history, despite all seven players ahead of him having played five seasons. Denison was the central figure in the revival of Queen’s football program, helping to return a once proud program to the national scene.

== Professional career ==
Since he began his collegiate career in 1998, Denison was eligible four year later for the 2002 CFL draft, prior to his back-to-back Hec Crighton Trophy wins. As a result, he was undrafted and was able to sign with any professional team. On December 10, 2003, it was announced that he had signed with the Winnipeg Blue Bombers. He attended training camp with the Blue Bombers in 2004 and played in the first pre-season game against the Calgary Stampeders where he had four completions on six pass attempts for 46 yards. However, he was released by the team shortly thereafter.

On August 31, 2004, Denison was signed by the Calgary Stampeders. He dressed in one regular season game with the team in 2004 but spent the remainder of his term with the team on the practice roster. He was eventually released by the Stampeders and signed with the Toronto Argonauts, but did not play in a game and was released.

Denison was a member of the Albany Conquest in their 2005 season.

== Northern Football Conference ==
Denison played for the Toronto Titans of the Northern Football Conference (a senior amateur league) from 2011 to 2012, and did not play in 2013. The club was re-named the GTA All-Stars and he re-joined to play for the team from 2014 to 2016.

== Coaching career ==
While playing for the GTA All-Stars, Denison served as the team's offensive coordinator for four years and the team's head coach in his final year. With the experience, he was hired as the associate head coach (offense) and offensive coordinator for the Saint Mary's Huskies in 2017. The Huskies exploded on offense on Denison's watch netting 474.6 yards per game up from 371 in 2016. They also nearly doubled their point total scoring 30.9 points per game up from 15.8. He then moved back to Ontario where he joined the Toronto Varsity Blues as the team's offensive coordinator for the 2019 season. The Blues led the nation in Yards per play and improved from 324 yards per game to 438.1 yards per game (7th in the nation). The Blues upset the Number 10 ranked Laurier Golden Hawks on 38-34 on a last minute drive. On April 6, 2020, it was announced that Denison had joined the York Lions to serve as the team's offensive coordinator. He left York in 2022.

In 2023, Denison joined the Edmonton Elks as an offensive analyst and was a member of the organization through the 2024 season.

Denison re-joined the coaching staff of the York Lions for the 2025 season as the senior offensive assistant. The Lions led the nation in passing yards, were fifth nationally in total offense, and were second nationally in first downs. He served in that capacity for one year.

In 2026, Denison joined the University of Louisiana Monroe Warhawks as an offensive analyst.
