= Blake Nill =

Canadian gridiron football coach (born 1962)

UBC Thunderbirds
- Title: Head coach

Personal information
- Born: February 16, 1962 (age 64); Hanna, Alberta, Canada
- Listed height: 6 ft 6 in (1.98 m)
- Listed weight: 275 lb (125 kg)

Career information
- Position: Defensive lineman
- University: Calgary
- CFL draft: 1983: 3rd round, 19th overall pick

Career history

Playing
- 1983–1986: Montreal Concordes

Coaching
- 1992–1997: St. Francis Xavier X-Men (DC)
- 1998–2005: Saint Mary's Huskies (HC)
- 2006–2014: Calgary Dinos (HC)
- 2015–present: UBC Thunderbirds (HC)

Awards and highlights
- U Sports Coach of the Year (1999); 3× Vanier Cup champion (2001, 2002, 2015)

Blake Nill (born February 16, 1962) is a Canadian former professional football defensive lineman and the current head coach for the University of British Columbia's football team, the UBC Thunderbirds. He is a three-time Vanier Cup champion as a head coach and was awarded the Frank Tindall Trophy in 1999.

== University career ==
Nill played CIAU football for the Calgary Dinosaurs as a defensive lineman from 1980 to 1982.

== Professional career ==
Nill was drafted in the third round, 19th overall, in the 1983 CFL draft by the Montreal Concordes of the Canadian Football League. He was originally drafted as a defensive lineman, but converted to the offensive line in his rookie year. He played in 44 regular season games with the Concordes/Alouettes franchise. He also spent time with the Winnipeg Blue Bombers and Hamilton Tiger-Cats, but did not play in any regular season games for those teams.

== Coaching career ==
=== St. Francis Xavier X-Men ===
While completing his Master's of Education at St. Francis Xavier University, Nill first began coaching for the St. Francis Xavier X-Men as the team's defensive coordinator in 1992. He coached for the X-Men for six seasons, highlighted by an appearance in the 32nd Vanier Cup game in 1996.

=== Saint Mary's Huskies ===
Nill was named the head coach for the Saint Mary's Huskies football team beginning with the 1998 season. In his second season, he led the Huskies to a first place finish in the Atlantic University Sport (AUS) conference and an appearance in the 35th Vanier Cup. He also won the Frank Tindall Trophy as the CIAU Coach of the Year in 1999. In 2001, he led the team to an undefeated season, punctuated by the Huskies' victory in the 37th Vanier Cup game. He won his second championship as a head coach in 2002 as the Huskies became the third football program to win back-to-back championships following the 38th Vanier Cup victory. His team made a fourth appearance in 2003, but lost to the Laval Rouge et Or. He left Saint Mary's following the 2005 season, where he posted a 49–15 regular season record with the Huskies program.

=== Calgary Dinos ===
On February 23, 2006, Nill was named head coach of his alma mater, Calgary Dinos. At the time, he took over a program that had not won a playoff game in ten years. In his third season, in 2008, he led the Dinos to not only their first playoff win since 1996, but also their first Hardy Cup championship since 1995. This began a period of Canada West dominance as the Dinos won six consecutive conference championships from 2008 to 2013. However, the team could not replicate the success on the national stage as the Dinos appeared in three Vanier Cups with Nill as head coach, but lost all three times, in 2009, 2010, and 2013.

=== UBC Thunderbirds ===
On December 9, 2014, Nill was named head coach of the UBC Thunderbirds. In his first year as head coach, in 2015, he defeated his former team, the Dinos, in the Hardy Cup, and then won his third Vanier Cup in the 51st Vanier Cup victory over the Montreal Carabins. In 2023, the Thunderbirds finished in first place in Canada West for the first time since 1999 and won their first Hardy Cup since Nill's first season with the team. The Thunderbirds appeared in the 58th Vanier Cup, but lost to the Montreal Carabins.
