= Larry Uteck =

Canadian gridiron football player and coach (1952–2002)

Profile
- Position: Defensive back

Personal information
- Born: October 9, 1952; Thornhill, Ontario, Canada
- Died: December 25, 2002 (aged 50); Halifax, Nova Scotia, Canada
- Listed height: 6 ft 0 in (1.83 m)
- Listed weight: 186 lb (84 kg)

Career information
- College: Colorado
- University: Wilfrid Laurier
- CFL draft: 2006

Career history

Playing
- 1974–1976: Toronto Argonauts
- 1977: BC Lions
- 1978–1980: Montreal Alouettes
- 1980: Ottawa Rough Riders

Coaching
- 1982: Saint Mary's Huskies (Assistant coach)
- 1983–1997: Saint Mary's Huskies (Head coach)

Operations
- 1995–2002: Saint Mary's Huskies (Athletic Director)

Awards and highlights
- CIAU Coach of the Year (1988, 1992); 2× Vanier Cup champion (2001, 2002); 2× CFL East All-Star (1975, 1976)

Career CFL statistics
- Games played: 95
- Interceptions: 12
- Fumble recoveries: 1
- Canadian Football Hall of Fame (Class of 2020)

Larry Uteck CC (October 9, 1952 – December 25, 2002) was a Canadian professional football athlete, university sports administrator, football coach, and municipal politician.

== Early life ==
Born in Thornhill, Ontario of Ukrainian descent, Larry Uteck attended Jesuit-run Brebeuf College School in Toronto, where he was a football star and Athlete of the Year. He then went to the University of Colorado (1970–73) on scholarship, playing with the Colorado Buffaloes, and then Wilfrid Laurier University (1973–74).

== Professional career ==
Following university, Uteck played with the Toronto Argonauts, BC Lions, Ottawa Rough Riders, and Montreal Alouettes in the Canadian Football League and was named Conference All-Star in 1975 and 1976. He served his fellow players as their League Representative in 1976. One of Uteck's inspirations was John Black, his school teacher from Marmora, Ontario.

== Coaching career ==
He coached the intracollege football team at St. Michael's College at the University of Toronto for 2 years, winning the Mulock Cup, then joined the sports program at Saint Mary's University in 1982, and became head football coach of the Saint Mary's Huskies in 1983 and continued through 1997, compiling a winning record. He was named AUAA Coach of the Year in 1987, 1988, 1989, 1990, and 1992. He was named CIAU Coach of the Year in 1988 and 1992. His teams appeared in five Atlantic Bowls and three Vanier Cups. In 1995, he was named interim director of athletics and recreation and was formally appointed director in 1997, a position in which he continued until his death.

== Political career ==
Uteck also worked for the larger Halifax community, notably as deputy mayor of the Halifax Regional Municipality, and was a champion of the Halifax Harbour Solutions Project. His deep love for his community took him into municipal politics and he was elected alderman for the City of Halifax, Ward 5. He served two years (1994–95) and was elected to the first Halifax Regional Municipal Council for District 13 (Northwest Arm-South End), where he served from 1995–1999. His quiet, but tenacious and thoughtful leadership saw him elected deputy mayor in 1998. He served with distinction on numerous HRM Committees including the Downtown Business Commission, Neptune Theatre, and the Halifax Port Corporation. His wife, Sue succeeded him as councillor for District 13 in December 1999.

== Personal life ==
Uteck married Sue Maloney in 1989, and they had two children, Luke (whom he named after Black's son) and Cain.

Uteck died on December 25, 2002.

== Honours ==
Uteck's remarkable leadership and vision were recognized when he was named a Member of the Order of Canada in October 2002. It was one of the few honours he would accept following the diagnosis of amyotrophic lateral sclerosis (ALS, a.k.a. Lou Gehrig's disease) in 1997 (one of his teammates on the Montreal Alouettes, Tony Proudfoot, also succumbed to the disease).

The only other honour he would accept was the naming of a Halifax road "Larry Uteck Boulevard" in February 2000, later a tri town road in 2014.

Following his death, and in consideration of his longtime Canadian football career as a professional athlete in the CFL, and coach at Saint Mary's University and as the university's athletic director, it was decided that the Churchill Bowl would be retired, with the Mitchell Bowl taking the place of the Churchill Bowl, and a new championship be named in Uteck's memory. Thus, the Uteck Bowl formally replaced the Atlantic Bowl.

His alma mater, Brebeuf College School, honoured him by renaming its sports field the Larry Uteck Memorial Field in 2004.

Uteck was inducted into the Canadian Football Hall of Fame as a builder in 2020.
