= 2003 CIS football season =

- Duration: August 29, 2003 – October 26, 2003
- Hardy Cup champions: Simon Fraser Clan
- Yates Cup champions: McMaster Marauders
- Dunsmore Cup champions: Laval Rouge et Or
- Loney Bowl champions: Saint Mary's Huskies
- Mitchell Bowl champions: Saint Mary's Huskies
- Uteck Bowl champions: Laval Rouge et Or

Vanier Cup
- Date: November 22, 2003
- Venue: SkyDome, Toronto
- Champions: Laval Rouge et Or

CIS football seasons seasons
- 2002 2004

The 2003 CIS football season began on August 29, 2003, and concluded with the 39th Vanier Cup national championship on November 22 at the SkyDome in Toronto, Ontario, with the Laval Rouge et Or winning their second championship. Twenty-seven universities across Canada competed in CIS football this season, the highest level of amateur play in Canadian football, under the auspices of Canadian Interuniversity Sport (CIS).

== Awards and records ==
=== Awards ===
- Hec Crighton Trophy – Tommy Denison, Queen's
- Presidents' Trophy – Neil McKinlay, Simon Fraser
- Russ Jackson Award – Curt McLellan, Queen's
- J. P. Metras Trophy – Ibrahim Khan, Simon Fraser
- Peter Gorman Trophy – Maxime Gagnier, Montreal

== All-Canadian team ==
=== First team ===
==== Offence ====
- QB Tommy Denison Queen's
- HB Jesse Lumsden McMaster
- HB Jarred Winkel Alberta
- WR Craig Spear Queen's
- WR Gilles Colon Bishop's
- IR Brendan Mahoney Simon Fraser
- IR J.-Fred. Tremblay Laval
- OT Paul Archer Saint Mary's
- OT Ibrahim Khan Simon Fraser
- OG Derek Armstrong StFX
- OG Carl Gourgues Laval
- C J.-Francois Joncas Laval

==== Defence ====
- DE Justin Shakell Laurier
- DE Troy Cunningham Concordia
- DT Ryan Gottselig Saskatchewan
- DT Nick Comly Acadia
- LB Shad McLachlan Acadia
- LB Neil McKinlay Simon Fraser
- LB Mickey Donovan Concordia
- CB Pascal Masson Laval
- CB Eric Nielsen Acadia
- DB Guillaume Roy McGill
- DB Sebastian Clovis Saint Mary's
- FS Jeremy Steeves StFX

==== Special teams ====
- K Jon Ryan Regina
- P Anand Pillai McGill

=== Second Team ===
==== Offence ====
- QB Mathieu Bertrand Laval
- RB Derek Medler Laurier
- RB Les Mullings Saint Mary's
- WR Andrew Gallant StFX
- WR Shane Ostapowich Regina
- IR Andy Fantuz Western
- IR Vaughan Swart McMaster
- OT Ryan Jeffrey Laurier
- OT J.-Francois Ostiguy Laval
- OG Dave Forde McMaster
- OG Adrian Olenick Saskatchewan
- C Jeff Melis Laurier

==== Defence ====
- DE Jack Gaudreau Queen's
- DE Dan Federkeil Calgary
- DT Matt Kirk Queen's
- DT Miguel Robede Laval
- LB Tristan Clovis McMaster
- LB Kevin MacNeill Laurier
- LB Agustin Barrenechea Calgary
- CB Clinton John York
- CB Eric Duchene Saskatchewan
- DB Kyler White Alberta
- DB Reid Smith Acadia
- FS Maxime Gagnier Montreal

==== Special teams ====
- K Matt Sharpe Acadia
- P Mike Ray McMaster

== Results ==
=== Regular-season standings ===
Note: GP = Games Played, W = Wins, L = Losses, OTL = Overtime Losses, PF = Points For, PA = Points Against, Pts = Points

Canada West
Team	GP	W	L	OTL	PF	PA	Pts
**Saskatchewan**	8	8	0	0	231	124	16
**Simon Fraser**	8	5	3	0	229	181	10
**Regina**	8	4	4	1	248	246	9
**Alberta**	8	4	4	0	262	164	8
Calgary	8	4	4	0	187	237	8
Manitoba	8	3	5	0	172	249	6
UBC	8	0	8	0	132	260	0

Ontario
Team	GP	W	L	OTL	PF	PA	Pts
**McMaster**	8	8	0	0	424	87	16
**Queen's**	8	7	1	1	341	134	15
**Laurier**	8	6	2	1	313	158	13
**Western**	8	5	3	0	306	257	12
**Windsor**	8	4	4	0	243	211	8
**Ottawa**	8	3	5	1	216	200	7
**York**	8	3	5	0	161	251	6
**Waterloo**	8	2	6	0	142	328	4
Guelph	8	2	6	0	161	285	4
Toronto	8	0	8	0	42	438	0

Quebec
Team	GP	W	L	PF	PA	Pts
**Laval**	8	7	1	481	86	14
**Concordia**	8	7	1	288	115	14
**Montreal**	8	6	2	220	160	12
**McGill**	8	3	5	171	205	6
Bishop's	8	2	6	191	327	4
Sherbrooke	8	0	8	10	491	0

Atlantic
Team	GP	W	L	OTL	PF	PA	Pts
**Saint Mary's**	8	7	1	0	338	128	14
**StFX**	8	4	4	0	201	171	8
**Acadia**	8	4	4	0	139	143	8
Mount Allison	8	0	8	1	66	279	1

Teams in bold have earned playoff berths.

=== Top 10 ===
CIS Top 10 Rankings
Team \ Week	1	2	3	4	5	6	7	8	9
Acadia Axemen	NR	NR	NR	NR	NR	NR	NR	NR	NR
Alberta Golden Bears	NR	NR	NR	9	8	8	8	8	9
Bishop's Gaiters	NR	NR	NR	NR	NR	NR	NR	NR	NR
Calgary Dinos	8	6	6	6	10	NR	NR	NR	NR
Concordia Stingers	NR	9	10	8	6	5	5	6	6
Guelph Gryphons	NR	NR	NR	NR	NR	NR	NR	NR	NR
Laurier Golden Hawks	NR	10	7	7	7	7	7	7	7
Laval Rouge et Or	6	5	5	4	4	6	6	3	3
Manitoba Bisons	9	8	NR	NR	NR	NR	NR	NR	NR
McGill Redmen	5	NR	NR	NR	NR	NR	NR	NR	NR
McMaster Marauders	3	3	3	3	3	3	3	2	2
Montreal Carabins	NR	NR	NR	10	9	9	9	9	NR
Mount Allison Mounties	NR	NR	NR	NR	NR	NR	NR	NR	NR
Ottawa Gee-Gees	NR	NR	9	NR	NR	NR	NR	NR	NR
Queen's Golden Gaels	4	4	4	5	5	4	4	4	4
Regina Rams	7	NR	NR	NR	NR	NR	NR	NR	10
Saint Mary's Huskies	1	1	1	1	1	1	1	5	5
Saskatchewan Huskies	2	2	2	2	2	2	2	1	1
Sherbrooke Vert et Or	NR	NR	NR	NR	NR	NR	NR	NR	NR
Simon Fraser Clan	NR	NR	NR	NR	NR	10	10	8	NR
St. Francis Xavier X-Men	10	7	8	NR	NR	NR	NR	NR	NR
Toronto Varsity Blues	NR	NR	NR	NR	NR	NR	NR	NR	NR
UBC Thunderbirds	NR	NR	NR	NR	NR	NR	NR	NR	NR
Waterloo Warriors	NR	NR	NR	NR	NR	NR	NR	NR	NR
Western Mustangs	NR	NR	NR	NR	NR	NR	NR	10	NR
Windsor Lancers	NR	NR	NR	NR	NR	NR	NR	NR	NR
York Lions	NR	NR	NR	NR	NR	NR	NR	NR	NR

Ranks in italics are teams not ranked in the top 10 poll but received votes.
NR = Not ranked. Source:

=== Championships ===
The Vanier Cup was played between the champions of the Mitchell Bowl and the Uteck Bowl, the national semi-final games. In 2003, the Uteck Bowl replaced the long-standing Churchill Bowl, which had been competed for since 1989 as a national semi-final game. Along with the Mitchell Bowl, the semi-final games now worked on a fully rotating basis, with the winners of the Canada West conference Hardy Trophy visiting the winners of the Atlantic conference Loney Bowl championship for the Uteck Bowl. The Ontario conference's Yates Cup championship team hosted the Dunsmore Cup Quebec champion for the Uteck Bowl.
