= 2000 CIAU football season =

- Duration: September 2, 2000 – November 4, 2000
- Hardy Cup champions: Regina Rams
- Yates Cup champions: McMaster Marauders
- Dunsmore Cup champions: Ottawa Gee-Gees
- Loney Bowl champions: Saint Mary's Huskies
- Atlantic Bowl champions: Regina Rams
- Churchill Bowl champions: Ottawa Gee-Gees

Vanier Cup
- Date: December 2, 2000
- Venue: SkyDome, Toronto
- Champions: Ottawa Gee-Gees

CIAU football seasons seasons
- 1999 2001

The 2000 CIAU football season began on September 2, 2000, and concluded with the 36th Vanier Cup national championship on December 2 at the SkyDome in Toronto, Ontario, with the Ottawa Gee-Gees winning their second championship. Twenty-four universities across Canada competed in CIAU football this season, the highest level of amateur play in Canadian football, under the auspices of the Canadian Interuniversity Athletics Union (CIAU).

== Awards and records ==
=== Awards ===
- Hec Crighton Trophy – Kojo Aidoo, McMaster
- Presidents' Trophy – Joey Mikawoz, Manitoba
- Russ Jackson Award – Carlo Panaro, Alberta
- J. P. Metras Trophy – Randy Chevrier, McGill
- Peter Gorman Trophy – Jean-Frédéric Tremblay, Laval

== All-Canadian team ==
=== First Team ===
==== Offence ====
- QB Ben Chapdelaine, McMaster
- RB Kojo Aidoo, McMaster
- RB Justin Praamsma, Laurier
- WR Andre Talbot, Laurier
- WR Geoff Drover, Calgary
- IR Ryan Janzen, McMaster
- IR Ben Wearing, McGill
- OT Carlo Panaro, Alberta
- OT Dan Gyetvai, Windsor
- OG Steve Jobin, Concordia
- OG James Hitchen, Laurier
- C Paul Guigna, Waterloo

==== Defence ====
- DT Randy Chevrier, McGill
- DT Jeremy Oxley, Guelph
- DE Kyl Morrison, Saint Mary's
- DE Pepe Esposito, Laval
- LB Joey Mikawoz, Manitoba
- LB Etienne Vanslette, Laval
- LB Javier Glatt, UBC
- FS Lukas Shaver, Ottawa
- DB Donnie Ruiz, Laurier
- DB Brock Balog, Calgary
- CB Darnell Edwards, Manitoba
- CB Jermaine Romans, Acadia

==== Special ====
- K Duncan O'Mahony, UBC
- P Michael O'Brien, Western

=== Second Team ===
==== Offence ====
- QB Phil Cote, Ottawa
- RB Ben Ouimet, Bishop's
- RB Dean Fisher, Calgary
- WR Michael Linton, McMaster
- WR Jay Currie, Saint Mary's
- IR Jason Clermont, Regina
- IR Patrick Thibeault, Saint Mary's
- IR James MacLean, Queen's
- OT Jon Landon, Queen's
- OT Greg Schaefer, UBC
- OG Eric Pickering, Bishop's
- OG Ryan Donnelly, McMaster
- C Karoly Toth, Saint Mary's
- C Serge Bourque, Bishop's

==== Defence ====
- DT Doug Borden, Saint Mary's
- DT Aaron Moser, Saskatchewan
- DE Mitch Sutherland, Alberta
- DE Kojo Millington, Laurier
- LB Damian Porter, Windsor
- LB Scott Coe, Manitoba
- LB Sebastian Roy, Mount Allison
- FS Ian Schafer, Calgary
- FS Kevin Taylor, Laurier
- DB Loan Duong, Concordia
- DB Denis Arruba, Saint Mary's
- DB Shane Sharpe, Alberta
- CB Greg Bourne, Waterloo
- CB Frantz Jacques, Ottawa

==== Special ====
- K Michael O'Brien, Western
- P Duncan O'Mahony, UBC

== Results ==
=== Regular season standings ===
Note: GP = Games Played, W = Wins, L = Losses, OTL = Overtime Losses, PF = Points For, PA = Points Against, Pts = Points

Canada West
Team	GP	W	L	T	PF	PA	Pts
**Manitoba**	8	6	1	1	279	138	13
**Calgary**	8	6	2	0	247	159	12
**Regina**	8	4	4	0	218	281	10
**UBC**	8	3	5	0	206	231	6
Alberta	8	2	5	1	144	180	5
Saskatchewan	8	2	6	0	127	232	4

Ontario
Team	GP	W	L	T	PF	PA	Pts
**McMaster**	8	7	1	0	325	86	14
**Laurier**	8	7	1	0	274	143	14
**Western**	8	6	2	0	244	152	12
**Waterloo**	8	4	4	0	208	176	8
Guelph	8	3	5	0	165	210	6
York	8	3	5	0	99	205	6
Windsor	8	1	7	0	95	209	2
Toronto	8	0	8	0	40	348	0

Ontario-Quebec
Team	GP	W	L	PF	PA	Pts
**Laval**	8	8	0	237	103	16
**Ottawa**	8	7	1	292	52	14
**McGill**	8	5	3	174	174	10
**Bishop's**	8	2	6	150	196	4
Concordia	8	2	6	153	204	4
Queen's	8	1	7	114	312	2

Atlantic
Team	GP	W	L	PF	PA	Pts
**Saint Mary's**	8	8	0	324	66	16
**Acadia**	8	4	4	196	155	8
StFX	8	3	5	65	228	6
Mount Allison	8	1	7	100	236	2

Teams in bold have earned playoff berths.

=== Top 10 ===
CIS Top 10 Rankings
Team \ Week	1	2	3	4	5	6	7	8	9
Acadia Axemen	8	6	6	8	NR	NR	NR	NR	NR
Alberta Golden Bears	NR	NR	NR	NR	NR	NR	NR	NR	NR
Bishop's Gaiters	NR	NR	NR	NR	NR	NR	NR	NR	NR
Calgary Dinos	NR	10	NR	NR	9	9	7	7	7
Concordia Stingers	NR	NR	NR	NR	NR	NR	NR	NR	NR
Guelph Gryphons	NR	NR	NR	NR	NR	NR	NR	NR	NR
Laurier Golden Hawks	4	3	3	6	5	5	5	5	5
Laval Rouge et Or	2	2	2	2	2	2	2	2	1
Manitoba Bisons	6	7	7	7	6	6	6	6	6
McGill Redmen	NR	NR	NR	10	7	7	8	10	10
McMaster Marauders	7	5	5	3	3	3	3	4	4
Mount Allison Mounties	NR	NR	NR	NR	NR	NR	NR	NR	NR
Ottawa Gee-Gees	5	4	4	4	4	4	4	3	3
Queen's Golden Gaels	NR	NR	NR	NR	NR	NR	NR	NR	NR
Regina Rams	NR	NR	NR	NR	NR	NR	NR	NR	NR
Saint Mary's Huskies	1	1	1	1	1	1	1	1	2
Saskatchewan Huskies	3	8	NR	NR	NR	NR	NR	NR	NR
Simon Fraser Clan	NR	NR	NR	NR	NR	NR	NR	NR	NR
St. Francis Xavier X-Men	NR	NR	NR	NR	NR	NR	NR	NR	NR
Toronto Varsity Blues	NR	NR	NR	NR	NR	NR	NR	NR	NR
UBC Thunderbirds	NR	NR	9	NR	10	10	NR	NR	NR
Waterloo Warriors	10	NR	10	9	NR	NR	10	9	9
Western Mustangs	9	9	8	5	8	8	9	8	8
Windsor Lancers	NR	NR	NR	NR	NR	NR	NR	NR	NR
York Lions	NR	NR	NR	NR	NR	NR	NR	NR	NR

Ranks in italics are teams not ranked in the top 10 poll but received votes.
NR = Not ranked. Source:

=== Championships ===
The Vanier Cup is played between the champions of the Atlantic Bowl and the Churchill Bowl, the national semi-final games. This year, the Dunsmore Cup Ontario-Quebec champion visited the Ontario conference's Yates Cup championship team for the Churchill Bowl. The winners of the Atlantic conference Loney Bowl championship hosted the winners of the Canada West conference Hardy Trophy for the Atlantic Bowl.
