= James Colzie III =

American football coach (born 1974)

Current position
- Title: Special teams coordinator & defensive backs coach
- Team: Ithaca
- Conference: Liberty

Biographical details
- Born: December 8, 1974 (age 51); Miami, Florida, U.S.

Playing career

Football
- 1993–1996: Florida State

Baseball
- 1994: Florida State
- Position: Cornerback (football)

Coaching career (HC unless noted)

Football
- 2000–2003: FIU (assistant STC/DB)
- 2004–2006: Florida State (GA)
- 2007: Valdosta State (STC/DB)
- 2008–2011: West Georgia (AHC/DC/STC/DB)
- 2012: Southern Arkansas (STC/RC/DB)
- 2013: Simon Fraser (DC/DB)
- 2014: Coffeyville (STC/RC/DB)
- 2015: UBC (DC/DB)
- 2016–2021: Saint Mary's (NS)
- 2022: Florida A&M (DB)
- 2023: Florida A&M (AHC/DB)
- 2024–2025: Florida A&M
- 2026–present: Ithaca (STC/DB)

Head coaching record
- Overall: 12–12 (NCAA); 23–20 (U Sports)
- Tournaments: 1–2 (U Sports playoffs)

Accomplishments and honors

Championships
- 1 AUS (2017)

James Colzie III (born December 8, 1974) is an American college football coach. He is the special teams coordinator and defensive backs coach for Ithaca College, positions he has held since 2026. He was the head football coach for Florida A&M University from 2024 to 2025. He was also the head football coach for Saint Mary's University in Halifax, Nova Scotia, from 2016 to 2021. He also coached for FIU, Florida State, Valdosta State, West Georgia, Southern Arkansas, Simon Fraser, Coffeyville Community College, and UBC. He played college football and baseball for Florida State. He is also an umpire for NCAA softball.

== Early life ==
Colzie was born on December 8, 1974, in Miami, Florida. His uncle, Neal Colzie, played in the National Football League (NFL), another uncle played minor league baseball and his grandfather, Jim Colzie, played Negro league baseball. He attended South Miami Senior High School where he played football, basketball and baseball under his father, James Colzie Jr., who was the school's athletic director. Playing defensive back in football, he was a top player with 24 career interceptions and was named All-State, All-Dade County and The Miami Herald Athlete of the Year as a senior. He also scored over 2,000 points in basketball as a point guard and hit .300 as a center fielder in baseball. Off the field, he was the only student of South Miami's Advanced Placement Chemistry class to have an A-average throughout his senior year. The number two-ranked prospect in the county, he committed to play college football for the Florida State Seminoles.

As a true freshman in 1993, Colzie appeared in all 13 games for Florida State and helped them win the national championship. He was a backup in the 1994 and 1995 seasons, recording 17 tackles and two interceptions in the latter year. However, his 1995 season was derailed when he was sentenced to four days in jail and 75 hours of community service for involvement in a nightclub fight. He then made "education and staying out of trouble" his priority and became a starter as a senior in 1996. He had 34 tackles and three interceptions that year. In addition to football, Colzie also played a season of baseball in 1994 at Florida State. An All-Atlantic Coast Conference (ACC) selection in 1996, Colzie reportedly had a brief stint with the Tampa Bay Buccaneers and played in the minor league baseball system of the Montreal Expos.

== Coaching career ==
Colzie began his coaching career with the FIU Panthers in 2000, serving as co-special teams coordinator and cornerbacks coach. He remained in the positions through the 2003 season. In 2004, he returned for Florida State as a graduate assistant, assisting the cornerbacks and punt returners. In 2007, he moved to the Valdosta State Blazers and helped them win the NCAA Division II championship as special teams and defensive backs coach. He joined the West Georgia Wolves in 2008 and served through 2011 as assistant head coach, defensive coordinator, special teams coordinator and defensive backs coach.

In 2012, Colzie served as special teams coordinator, recruiting coordinator and defensive backs coach for the Southern Arkansas Muleriders. He moved to Canada in 2013 and served as defensive coordinator and defensive backs coach for the Simon Fraser Clan. He then was the defensive coordinator, recruiting coordinator and defensive backs coach for the Coffeyville Red Ravens community college team in 2014. Colzie was the defensive coordinator and defensive backs coach for the UBC Thunderbirds in 2015 and helped them win the Vanier Cup. In 2016, he was named head coach of the Saint Mary's Huskies. He served as their head coach for five seasons (2020 was cancelled due to the COVID-19 pandemic) and compiled an overall record of 18–20, helping them reach the Atlantic University Sport (AUS) championship twice. He resigned prior to the 2022 season.

In 2022, Colzie was hired by the Florida A&M Rattlers as a defensive backs coach. He added the role of assistant head coach in 2023 and helped them win the Southwestern Athletic Conference (SWAC) championship and the Celebration Bowl that season. After Willie Simmons left following the 2023 season to become running backs coach for the Duke Blue Devils, Colzie was named interim head coach, later being named full-time head coach in January 2024.

On December 8, 2025, Colzie was fired from Florida A&M after two seasons.

On March 31, 2026, Colzie was hired as special teams coordinator/defensive backs coach for the Ithaca Bombers.

== Head coaching record ==
=== NCAA ===
Year	Team	Overall	Conference	Standing	Bowl/playoffs
Florida A&M Rattlers (Southwestern Athletic Conference) (2024–2025)
2024	Florida A&M	7–5	5–3	T–2nd (East)	
2025	Florida A&M	5–7	4–4	4th (East)	
Florida A&M:		12–12	9–7		
Total:		12–12			

=== U Sports ===
Year	Team	Overall	Conference	Standing	Bowl/playoffs	U Sports Top 10^{#}
Saint Mary's Huskies (Atlantic University Sport) (2016–2021)
2016	Saint Mary's	3–6	2–5	T–3rd		
2017	Saint Mary's	6–3	5–3	2nd	L Loney	8
2018	Saint Mary's	8–1	7–1	1st	L Loney	
2019	Saint Mary's	4–5	3–5	T–3rd		
2020	No team					
2021	Saint Mary's	2–5	1–5	T–4th		
Saint Mary's:		23–20	18–19			
Total:		23–20				
National championship Conference title Conference division title or championship game berth
