= Greg Vavra =

Canadian football player (born 1961)

No. 13, 17, 18
- Position: Quarterback

Personal information
- Born: February 19, 1961 (age 65); Red Deer, Alberta, Canada
- Listed height: 6 ft 1 in (1.85 m)
- Listed weight: 195 lb (88 kg)

Career information
- High school: Bishop Grandin (Calgary, Alberta)
- University: Calgary (1979–1983)
- CFL draft: 1983

Career history

Playing
- 1983: Calgary Stampeders*
- 1983: Edmonton Eskimos*
- 1984–1985: Calgary Stampeders
- 1986: Edmonton Eskimos*
- 1986–1987: BC Lions
- 1988: Edmonton Eskimos
- * Offseason or practice squad member only

Coaching
- 2006–2010: Calgary Dinos (Offensive coordinator)
- 2015–2016: Calgary Dinos (Quarterbacks coach)

Awards and highlights
- 19th Vanier Cup (1983); Hec Crighton Trophy (1983); First-team All-Canadian (1983); Calgary Dinos #17 retired

Career CFL statistics
- Pass attempts: 524
- Pass completions: 253
- Percentage: 48.3
- TD–INT: 17–31
- Passing yards: 3,236
- Canadian Football Hall of Fame (Class of 2020)

Greg Vavra (born February 19, 1961) is a Canadian former professional football quarterback who played five seasons in the Canadian Football League (CFL) with the Calgary Stampeders, BC Lions and Edmonton Eskimos. He played CIAU football for the Calgary Dinosaurs and won the Hec Crighton Trophy in 1983.

== Early life ==
Vavra attended Bishop Grandin High School in Calgary, Alberta.

== University career ==
Vavra played CIAU football for the Calgary Dinosaurs as a quarterback, placekicker, and punter from 1979 to 1983. On October 7, 1983, he set the CIAU record for most passing yards in a game with 627 yards in their game against the Saskatchewan Huskies. He set a single season record for passing yards that year with 2,823, which was surpassed in 2002 by Tommy Denison. For the season, he was named a First-team All-Canadian and was awarded the Hec Crighton Trophy. In his final year in 1983, the Calgary Dinosaurs won the 19th Vanier Cup, with Vavra throwing two touchdowns, as well as kicking five field goals and one convert in the game. For his career, he completed 611 passes out of 1200 attempts for 8,401 passing yards and 63 passing touchdowns.

On November 4, 1983, Vavra became the first University of Calgary student-athlete to have his uniform number (17) retired by a varsity team of the school. He was inducted into the University of Calgary Athletic Hall of Fame on October 12, 1995. Vavra was inducted into the Canadian Football Hall of Fame as a university player in 2020.

== Professional career ==
Vavra was drafted as a territorial exemption by the Calgary Stampeders in the 1983 CFL draft but was traded to the Edmonton Eskimos for Mike Levenseller on June 22, 1983. He was released in July 1983 and returned to the Calgary Dinos to complete his university eligibility.

He re-signed with the Stampeders in 1984 where he played in 11 games as a rookie and started nine while posting a 4–5 win–loss record as a starter. That year, he completed 161 passes from 324 attempts for 1,901 yards, 10 touchdowns, and 16 interceptions. In 1985, Vavra was used more as a back-up as he played in 10 games and started in just two, where he completed 32 passes on 73 attempts for 391 yards with one touchdown and five interceptions. With a 1–1 record as a starter that year, he was the last Canadian quarterback to start and win a game until Brandon Bridge accomplished the feat in 2017.

As a free agent in 1986, Vavra signed again with the Edmonton Eskimos, but was released in June 1986. He later signed with the BC Lions, where he played for two years and dressed in 23 games, and completed 50 passes on 101 attempts for 829 yards, five touchdowns, and seven interceptions. He started his last game at quarterback on October 11, 1987, but the Lions lost to the Stampeders. After the 1987 season, Vavra signed with the Eskimos in 1988 for a third time and suited up as a back up quarterback that year, playing in 11 games and completing 10 passes from 26 attempts for 105 yards, one touchdown, and three interceptions.

Vavra retired after the 1988 season in order to complete his law degree and work in the oil and gas industry.

== Coaching career ==
Vavra joined the coaching staff of the Calgary Dinos in 2006 to serve as the team's offensive coordinator; a position he held for five years. He re-joined the team in 2015 as the quarterbacks coach and served in that capacity for two years.
