= 2nd Vanier Cup =

1966 Canadian university football championship

St. Francis Xavier X-Men	Waterloo Lutheran Golden Hawks
40	14
Head coach: Don Loney	Head coach: Dave "Tuffy" Knight
	1	2	3	4	Total
St. Francis Xavier X-Men	0	0	0	40	40
Waterloo Lutheran Golden Hawks	0	0	0	14	14
- Date: November 19, 1966
- Stadium: Varsity Stadium
- Location: Toronto
- Ted Morris Memorial Trophy: Terry Gorman, St. Francis Xavier
- Attendance: 13,678

The 2nd Vanier Cup was played on November 19, 1966, at Varsity Stadium in Toronto, Ontario, and decided Canada's university football champions by way of a national invitation to participate in the game. The St. Francis Xavier X-Men and the Waterloo Lutheran Golden Hawks were invited by a national panel to compete in a single elimination game to decide the Canadian university football champion for the 1966 season. The X-Men won their first ever championship by defeating the Golden Hawks by a score of 40-14.
