= Hec Crighton =

Canadian football coach (1900–1967)

Profile
- Position: Head Coach

Personal information
- Born: April 2, 1900; Toronto, Ontario, Canada
- Died: April 17, 1967 (aged 67); Toronto, Ontario
- Canadian Football Hall of Fame (Class of 1986)

Hector Naismith Crighton (April 2, 1900 – April 17, 1967) was a Canadian football coach. He coached 35 seasons of high school Canadian football, and he also rewrote the rule book in 1952. He was inducted into the Canadian Football Hall of Fame in 1986. The Hec Crighton Trophy, given each year to the outstanding CIS football player, is named after him.
