= Peter Gorman Trophy =

The Peter Gorman Trophy is awarded to the Rookie of the Year in U Sports Football. The Trophy acknowledges the great contribution Peter Gorman has made to the development of Canadian University Football. As founder of the Canadian College Bowl, his emphasis has always been on the youth of Canada, and is therefore associated with the award to encourage U Sports rookies.

== List of Peter Gorman winners ==
Year	Winner	School
1976	Jim Reid	Laurier
1977	Gord Goodwin	Calgary
1978	John Lowe	Guelph
1979	Joey Tynes	St. Francis Xavier
1980	John Hutchison	Mount Allison
1981	Glen Steele	UBC
1982	Mike Fabiilli	Ottawa
1983	Paul Nastasiuk	Laurier
1984	Jeff Funtasz	Alberta
1985	Mark Brown	Carleton
1986	Michael Soles	McGill
1987	Dan Farthing	Saskatchewan
1988	Grant Keaney	Mount Allison
1989	Chris Banton	Ottawa
1990	Bill Kubas	Laurier
1991	Domenic Zagari	Manitoba
1992	Sean Reade	Western
1993	Jerome Pathon	Acadia
1994	Andre Arlain	St. Francis Xavier
1995	Éric Lapointe	Mount Allison
1996	Jeff Johnson	York
1997	Paul Carty	St. Francis Xavier
1998	Kojo Aidoo	McMaster
1999	Sébastien Roy	Mount Allison
2000	J.-Frédéric Tremblay	Laval
2001	Jeremy Steeves	St. Francis Xavier
2002	Andrew Fantuz	Western
2003	Maxime Gagnier	Montreal
2004	Kyle Williams	Bishop's
2005	Martin Gagné	Montreal
2006	Dalin Tollestrup	Calgary
2007	Liam Mahoney	Concordia
2008	Jordan Verdone	Waterloo
2009	Linden Gaydosh	Calgary
2010	Eric Dzwilewski	Calgary
2011	Tyler Varga	Western
2012	Shaquille Johnson	McGill
2013	Daniel Vandervoort	McMaster
2014	Hugo Richard	Laval
2015	Mathieu Betts	Laval
2016	Jakob Loucks	Mount Allison
2017	Tre Ford	Waterloo
2018	Tyson Philpot	Calgary
2019	Jeremy Murphy	Concordia
2021	Jaylan Greaves	Concordia
2022	Eloa Latendresse-Regimbald	McGill
2023	Justin Cloutier	Laval
2024	Enrique James Leclair	Montreal
2025	Pepe Gonzalez	Montreal

== Trophies by team ==
School	Trophies
Calgary	5
Mount Allison	5
St. Francis Xavier	4
Laval	4
Montreal	4
Wilfird Laurier	3
McGill	3
Western	3
Concordia	3
Ottawa	2
McMaster	2
Waterloo	2
Guelph	1
UBC	1
Alberta	1
Carleton	1
Saskatchewan	1
Manitoba	1
Acadia	1
York	1
Bishop's	1

Six active teams have never had a player win the Peter Gorman Trophy: Queen's Gaels (OUA), Regina Rams (CanWest), Saint Mary's Huskies (AUS), Sherbrooke Vert-et-Or (RSEQ), Toronto Varsity Blues (OUA), Windsor Lancers (OUA)

== See also ==
- Hec Crighton Trophy
- J. P. Metras Trophy
- Presidents' Trophy
- Russ Jackson Award
