= 2001 CIAU football season =

- Duration: August 31, 2001 – November 3, 2001
- Hardy Cup champions: Manitoba Bisons
- Yates Cup champions: McMaster Marauders
- Dunsmore Cup champions: Laval Rouge et Or
- Loney Bowl champions: Saint Mary's Huskies
- Churchill Bowl champions: Manitoba Bisons
- Atlantic Bowl champions: Saint Mary's Huskies

Vanier Cup
- Date: December 1, 2001
- Venue: SkyDome, Toronto
- Champions: Saint Mary's Huskies

CIAU football seasons seasons
- 2000 2002

The 2001 CIAU football season began on August 31, 2001, and concluded with the 37th Vanier Cup national championship on December 1 at the SkyDome in Toronto, Ontario, with the Saint Mary's Huskies winning their second championship. Twenty-four universities across Canada competed in CIAU football this season, the highest level of amateur play in Canadian football, under the auspices of the Canadian Interuniversity Athletics Union (CIAU).

== Awards and records ==
=== Awards ===
- Hec Crighton Trophy – Ben Chapdelaine, McMaster
- Presidents' Trophy – David Stipe, Bishop's
- Russ Jackson Award – Josh Alexander, Wilfrid Laurier
- J. P. Metras Trophy – Carl Gourgues, Laval
- Peter Gorman Trophy – Jeremy Steeves, St. Francis Xavier

== All-Canadian team ==
=== First team ===
==== Offence ====
- QB Ben Chapdelaine, McMaster
- RB Luis Perez, Saint Mary's
- RB Mike Bradley, Waterloo
- WR Jason Currie, Saint Mary's
- WR Chris Rankin, McMaster
- IR James MacLean, Queen's
- IR Jason Clermont, Regina
- OT Dan Gyetvai, Windsor
- OT Jean-Michel Sylvain, Saint Mary's
- OG Devin Rodger, Manitoba
- OG Carl Gourgues, Laval
- C Christopher Bochen, Manitoba

==== Defence ====
- DE Chuck Walsh, Waterloo
- DE Karim Grant, Acadia
- DT Israel Idonije, Manitoba
- DT Doug Borden, Saint Mary's
- LB Scott Coe, Manitoba
- LB Jeff Zimmer, Regina
- LB Mark Pretzlaff, Ottawa
- CB Curtis Nash, Saint Mary's
- CB Darnell Edwards, Manitoba
- DB Scott Gordon, Ottawa
- DB Dennis Mavrin, York
- S David Stipe, Bishop's

==== Special teams ====
- K Jamie Boreham, Manitoba
- P Burke Dales, Concordia

=== Second Team ===
==== Offence ====
- QB Ryan Jones, Saint Mary's
- RB Mathieu Brassard, Laval
- RB Kenneth Vermette, Manitoba
- WR Joe Orel, Manitoba
- WR Jonathan Bohnert, Guelph
- IR Mike Palmer, Guelph
- IR Patrick Thibeault, Saint Mary's
- OT François Boulianne, Laval
- OT Todd Krenbrink, Regina
- OG Ryan Donnelly, McMaster
- OG John Salmas, Saint Mary's
- C Colin Oldrieve, Saint Mary's

==== Defence ====
- DE Hughes Beauchamp, Laval
- DE Warren Doekper, Manitoba
- DT Rob Stewart, Manitoba
- DT John MacDonald, McGill
- LB Adam MacDonald, StFX
- LB Javier Glatt, UBC
- LB Damian Porter, Windsor
- CB Eric Duchene, Saskatchewan
- CB Brad German, Ottawa
- DB Derick Fury, Mount Allison
- DB Gregory Hoover, Calgary
- S Jamie Boreham, Manitoba

==== Special teams ====
- K Norman Nasser, Guelph
- P Matt Armstrong, Waterloo

== Results ==
=== Regular-season standings ===
Note: GP = Games Played, W = Wins, L = Losses, OTL = Overtime Losses, PF = Points For, PA = Points Against, Pts = Points

Canada West
Team	GP	W	L	OTL	PF	PA	Pts
**Manitoba**	8	7	1	0	302	91	14
**Regina**	8	5	3	0	261	202	10
**Saskatchewan**	8	5	3	0	200	172	10
**Calgary**	8	3	5	0	130	260	6
UBC	8	2	6	1	132	233	5
Alberta	8	2	6	0	133	200	4

Ontario
Team	GP	W	L	T	PF	PA	Pts
**McMaster**	8	7	0	1	301	81	15
**Ottawa**	8	6	2	0	247	168	12
**Western**	8	5	3	0	189	150	10
**Queen's**	8	5	3	0	201	171	10
**Waterloo**	8	4	3	1	194	108	9
**Laurier**	8	3	5	0	104	138	6
**York**	8	3	5	0	153	216	6
**Guelph**	8	3	5	0	164	237	6
Windsor	8	2	6	0	96	196	4
Toronto	8	1	7	0	92	276	2

Quebec
Team	GP	W	L	PF	PA	Pts
**Laval**	8	5	3	234	95	10
**Concordia**	8	5	3	174	191	10
**McGill**	8	4	4	161	166	8
**Bishop's**	8	2	6	107	224	4

Atlantic
Team	GP	W	L	PF	PA	Pts
**Saint Mary's**	8	8	0	480	35	16
**Acadia**	8	4	4	121	187	8
StFX	8	3	5	106	202	6
Mount Allison	8	1	7	47	330	2

Teams in bold have earned playoff berths.

=== Top 10 ===
CIS Top 10 Rankings
Team \ Week	1	2	3	4	5	6	7	8	9	10
Acadia Axemen	9	9	8	8	9	NR	NR	NR	NR	NR
Alberta Golden Bears	NR	8	NR	NR	NR	NR	NR	NR	NR	NR
Bishop's Gaiters	NR	NR	NR	NR	NR	NR	NR	NR	NR	NR
Calgary Dinos	7	NR	NR	NR	NR	NR	NR	NR	NR	NR
Concordia Stingers	NR	NR	9	9	10	7	6	9	7	10
Guelph Gryphons	NR	NR	10	NR	NR	NR	NR	NR	NR	NR
Laurier Golden Hawks	NR	NR	NR	NR	NR	NR	NR	NR	NR	NR
Laval Rouge et Or	2	2	6	7	6	8	7	5	4	5
Manitoba Bisons	6	7	7	6	5	5	5	3	3	3
McGill Redmen	10	10	NR	NR	10	NR	NR	NR	NR	NR
McMaster Marauders	5	5	4	4	4	3	2	2	2	2
Mount Allison Mounties	NR	NR	NR	NR	NR	NR	NR	NR	NR	NR
Ottawa Gee-Gees	1	1	1	1	1	1	3	4	6	4
Queen's Golden Gaels	NR	NR	NR	NR	NR	NR	10	7	10	9
Regina Rams	3	3	2	2	2	4	4	6	5	6
Saint Mary's Huskies	4	4	3	3	3	2	1	1	1	1
Saskatchewan Huskies	NR	NR	NR	NR	NR	10	10	8	9	7
Simon Fraser Clan	NR	NR	NR	NR	NR	NR	NR	NR	NR	NR
St. Francis Xavier X-Men	NR	NR	NR	NR	NR	NR	NR	NR	NR	NR
Toronto Varsity Blues	NR	NR	NR	NR	NR	NR	NR	NR	NR	NR
UBC Thunderbirds	NR	NR	NR	NR	NR	NR	NR	NR	NR	NR
Waterloo Warriors	NR	NR	10	10	7	6	8	10	10	NR
Western Mustangs	8	6	5	5	8	9	9	10	8	8
Windsor Lancers	NR	NR	NR	NR	NR	NR	NR	NR	NR	NR
York Lions	NR	NR	NR	NR	NR	NR	NR	NR	NR	NR

Ranks in italics are teams not ranked in the top 10 poll but received votes.
NR = Not ranked. Source:

=== Championships ===
The Vanier Cup is played between the champions of the Atlantic Bowl and the Churchill Bowl, the national semi-final games. This year, the winners of the Canada West conference Hardy Trophy hosted the Ontario conference's Yates Cup championship team for the Churchill Bowl. The winners of the Atlantic conference Loney Bowl championship hosted the Dunsmore Cup Quebec champion for the Atlantic Bowl.
