= Jim Colzie =

American baseball player (1920–2010)

- Pitcher
- Born: July 12, 1920; Montezuma, Georgia, U.S.
- Died: March 22, 2010 (aged 89); Miami, Florida, U.S.
- Batted: Right Threw: Right

Negro league baseball debut
- 1946

Last appearance
- 1952
- Stats at Baseball Reference

Teams
- Indianapolis Clowns (1946–1947); Atlanta Black Crackers

James "Fireball" Colzie (July 12, 1920 – March 23, 2010) was an American Negro league baseball pitcher. He played mostly for the Indianapolis Clowns and the Atlanta Black Crackers. He served in the United States Army during World War II.

On July 20, 1947, the Clowns' team bus was struck by a car, resulting in Colzie dislocating his knee. Colzie sued the driver of the car and was awarded $4,000.

His son, Neal Colzie, was a National Football League player. Colzie's grandson, James Colzie III, is a college football coach.
