= Churchill Bowl =

Former Canadian collegiate football semifinal game

- Sport: Canadian football
- League: CIS
- Awarded for: Winning the CIS Semifinal Championship
- Country: Canada

History
- First award: 1953
- Editions: 46
- Final award: 2002
- First winner: McGill Redmen
- Most wins: Western Mustangs (9)
- Most recent: Saint Mary's Huskies (2002)

The Sir Winston Churchill Bowl was one of two semi-final bowl games played in Canadian Interuniversity Sport football that would determine a participant in the Vanier Cup national championship. The trophy was originally donated and managed by McGill University to serve as an annual, often pre-season, invitational football contest between the sister universities of McGill and UBC in aid of the Canadian Paraplegic Association. The Churchill Bowl was retired in 2003 and replaced by the Mitchell Bowl.

== History ==
The Churchill Bowl was originally created for Canadian University football invitational competition in 1953. The trophy was a sculpture created by R. Tait McKenzie entitled "The Onslaught".

Many of the games were regarded as an unofficial national championship of Canada, although three other university football leagues were not invited to play and disputed this claim. From 1953 through 1958 the game was a pre-season interconference exhibition. In 1959 and 1960, the Churchill Bowl was switched to a post-season game, pitting the Yates Cup and Hardy Trophy champions against each other in the first attempt in an unofficial national championship. There were eleven unofficial national championship or challenge games played between 1953 and 1964.

Staging games could prove to be difficult at times. In 1961 the Queen's Golden Gaels were the Yates Cup champions scheduled to play the Western Canadian Hardy Cup champion Alberta Golden Bears. However, the Ontario Intercollegiate Football Conference champion McMaster Marauders challenged Queen's to a post-season match which the Gaels were forced to play. With no game scheduled, the McGill Redmen hosted the Jewett Trophy champion St. Francis Xavier X-Men.

In 1963, the Hardy and Yates champions again faced off in the "Golden Bowl" between the Alberta Golden Bears and Queen's Golden Gaels, but McGill chose to hold onto to Churchill Bowl and play the Atlantic champion St. FX for a third consecutive year. Alberta's 25-7 victory marked the first major western victory over an eastern team, with McGill also losing to the X-Men in the Churchill. These events spurred an effort to create an official national championship.

When the Vanier Cup was staged as an official national championship in 1965, the trophy was retired. From 1968 to 1988 one of the national semi-final games was variously named Western Bowl, Forest City Bowl and Central Bowl.

In 1989, the CIAU requested and were given permission by the trustees of the trophy to reinstate the award for annual presentation to the winner of the National semi-final game, the Churchill Bowl. The trophy was taken out of storage at McGill and presented as the winner of this game. The winner of the Atlantic Bowl would meet the winner of the Churchill Bowl for the Vanier Cup. In 2003, the Churchill Bowl game was renamed the Uteck Bowl in honour of Larry Uteck. The trophy was retired for the second time.

== Churchill Bowl Games ==
Date	Champion	Score	Runner up	Location
1953	McGill Redmen	22-7	UBC Thunderbirds	Percival Molson Stadium/Montreal, PQ
1954	McGill Redmen	8-5	UBC Thunderbirds	Percival Molson Stadium/Montreal, PQ
1955	UBC Thunderbirds	0-0	McGill Redmen	Varsity Stadium/Vancouver, BC
1956	Western Mustangs	38-13	UBC Thunderbirds	Varsity Stadium/Vancouver, BC
1957-09-21	Western Mustangs	54-0	UBC Thunderbirds	J.W. Little Stadium/London, ON
1958	McGill Redmen	9–6	UBC Thunderbirds	Percival Molson Stadium/Montreal, PQ
1959-11-14	Western Mustangs	34–7	UBC Thunderbirds	Varsity Stadium, Toronto, ON
1960	McGill Redmen	46–7	Alberta Golden Bears	Percival Molson Stadium, Montreal, PQ
1961	McGill Redmen	21-7	St. Francis Xavier X-Men	Percival Molson Stadium, Montreal, PQ
1962	McGill Redmen	13-6	St. Francis Xavier X-Men	Percival Molson Stadium, Montreal, PQ
1963	St. Francis Xavier X-Men	14-7	McGill Redmen	Oland Field, Antigonish, NS
1964	Queen's Golden Gaels vs. Alberta Golden Bears, not played			
1965	No competition			
1966	No competition			
1967	No competition			
1968	Queen's Golden Gaels	29–6	Manitoba Bisons	Winnipeg, MB
1969	Manitoba Bisons	41–7	Windsor Lancers	Winnipeg, MB
1970	Manitoba Bisons	24–20 (OT)	Queen's Golden Gaels	Winnipeg, MB
1971-11-13	Alberta Golden Bears	53–2	Bishop's Gaiters	Edmonton, AB
1972-11-18	Alberta Golden Bears	58–6	Loyola College	Edmonton, AB
1973-11-17	McGill Redmen	16–0	Manitoba Bisons	
1974-11-16	Western Mustangs	41–17	Saskatchewan Huskies	London, ON
1975-11-15	Ottawa Gee-Gees	45–6	Windsor Lancers	Ottawa, ON
1976-11-13	Western Mustangs	30–8	UBC Thunderbirds	London, ON
1977-11-12	Western Mustangs	24–22	Calgary Dinos	London, ON
1978-11-11	UBC Thunderbirds	25–16	Wilfrid Laurier Golden Hawks	Vancouver, BC
1979-11-10	Western Mustangs	32–14	Queen's Golden Gaels	London, ON
1980-11-15	Alberta Golden Bears	14–4	Western Mustangs	Edmonton, AB
1981-11-21	Alberta Golden Bears	32–31	Western Mustangs	Edmonton, AB
1982-11-13	Western Mustangs	17–7	Concordia Stingers	London, ON
1983-11-12	Queen's Golden Gaels	21–7	Toronto Varsity Blues	Kingston, ON
1984-11-17	Guelph Gryphons	12–7	Calgary Dinos	Guelph, ON
1985-11-23	Calgary Dinos	56–14	Carleton Ravens	McMahon Stadium, Calgary, AB
1986-11-15	UBC Thunderbirds	32–30	Bishop's Gaiters	Lennoxville, PQ
1987-11-14	UBC Thunderbirds	33–31	Wilfrid Laurier Golden Hawks	Vancouver, BC
1988-11-12	Calgary Dinos	34–15	Western Mustangs	London, ON
1989-11-11	Saskatchewan Huskies	39–10	Queen's Golden Gaels	Saskatoon, SK
1990-11-17	Saskatchewan Huskies	41–13	Bishop's Gaiters	Montreal, PQ
1991-11-16	Wilfrid Laurier Golden Hawks	42–22	Queen's Golden Gaels	SkyDome, Toronto, ON
1992-11-14	Queen's Golden Gaels	23–16	Guelph Gryphons	SkyDome, Toronto, ON
1993-11-13	Toronto Varsity Blues	26–16	Concordia Stingers	SkyDome, Toronto, ON
1994-11-12	Western Mustangs	41–24	Bishop's Gaiters	Lennoxville, PQ
1995-11-18	Calgary Dinos	37–7	Ottawa Gee-Gees	Calgary, AB
1996-11-16	Saskatchewan Huskies	33–9	Guelph Gryphons	Waterloo, ON
1997-11-15	Waterloo Warriors (*)	37–44	Ottawa Gee-Gees (*)	Ottawa, ON
1998-11-21	Saskatchewan Huskies	33–17	Western Mustangs	Saskatoon, SK
1999-11-20	Laval Rouge et Or	27–21	Saskatchewan Huskies	Ste. Foy, PQ
2000-11-18	Ottawa Gee-Gees	20–15	McMaster Marauders	Hamilton, ON
2001-11-17	Manitoba Bisons	27–6	McMaster Marauders	Winnipeg, MB
2002-11-16	Saint Mary's Huskies	36–25	McMaster Marauders	Hamilton, ON

(*) Note: The Ottawa Gee-Gees were forced to forfeit all of their post-season titles in 1997 because they had ineligible players on their roster.
