= Neal Colzie =

American football player (1953–2001)

No. 45, 20
- Position: Cornerback

Personal information
- Born: February 28, 1953; Fitzgerald, Georgia, U.S.
- Died: August 20, 2001 (aged 48); Miami, Florida, U.S.
- Listed height: 6 ft 2 in (1.88 m)
- Listed weight: 200 lb (91 kg)

Career information
- High school: Coral Gables Senior (Coral Gables, Florida)
- College: Ohio State
- NFL draft: 1975: 1st round, 24th overall pick

Career history
- Oakland Raiders (1975–1978); Miami Dolphins (1979); Tampa Bay Buccaneers (1980–1983); Orlando Renegades (1985)

Awards and highlights
- Super Bowl champion (XI); PFWA All-Rookie Team (1975); First-team All-American (1974); 2× First-team All-Big Ten (1973, 1974)

Career NFL statistics
- Interceptions: 25
- Kickoff returns: 7
- Punt returns: 170
- Stats at Pro Football Reference

Cornelius Connie "Neal" Colzie (February 28, 1953 – August 20, 2001) was an American professional football player who was a cornerback in the National Football League (NFL). He played college football for the Ohio State Buckeyes and was selected in the first round of the 1975 NFL draft with the 24th overall pick.

== Early life ==
Born on February 28, 1953, in Fitzgerald, Georgia, Colzie was one of six children of Thelma and Jim Colzie. His father was a Negro league baseball pitcher. After attending Coral Gables Senior High School in Coral Gables, Florida, he played for Ohio State University, where he recorded 15 interceptions and returned 60 punts for 855 yards and two touchdowns. At the time, his 15 interceptions ranked him fourth in school history, and his 855 punt return yards were a school record.

== Professional career ==
During his nine-season career, Colzie recorded a total of 25 interceptions, which he returned for 412 yards and a touchdown. He also recovered five fumbles, returning them for 42 yards and a touchdown. His best season was in 1981, recording six interceptions for 110 yards and a touchdown, along with one fumble recovery. Colzie also returned seven kickoffs for 130 yards in his career.

Colzie excelled as a punt returner on special teams. In his first NFL season, he recorded 655 punt return yards, the most ever by an NFL rookie. Overall, Colzie returned 170 punts for 1,759 yards during his career. One of his more notable performances was in the Raiders' 32–14 win over the Minnesota Vikings in Super Bowl XI. Colzie recorded four punt returns for a Super Bowl record of 43 yards, including a 25-yard return that set up a Raiders touchdown, and a 12-yard return that set up a field goal. He played in the NFL for the Oakland Raiders (1975–1978), Miami Dolphins (1979), and Tampa Bay Buccaneers (1980–1983). He also played for the Orlando Renegades of the United States Football League (USFL) in 1985.

He was offered a role in the movie " Black Sunday " but turned it down, refusing to wear a Pittsburgh Steelers uniform for the role.

Colzie died on August 20, 2001, in Miami of a heart attack at the age of 48.
