= Atlantic Bowl =

Former Canadian collegiate football semifinal game

- Sport: Canadian football
- League: CIS
- Competition: Atlantic University Sport champions and a conference-winning central Canadian team
- Awarded for: Winning the CIS Semifinal Championship
- Venue: Huskies Stadium
- Country: Canada

History
- First award: 1956
- Editions: 43 (not awarded 1965 and 1966)
- Final award: 2001
- First winner: Hamilton Jrs.
- Most wins: Saint Mary's Huskies (7)
- Most recent: Saint Mary's Huskies (2001)

The Atlantic Bowl was one of the two national semifinal men's football games of Canadian Interuniversity Sport (now known as U Sports). The winner of the Atlantic Bowl would meet the winner of the Churchill Bowl for the Vanier Cup. It was replaced by the Uteck Bowl in 2001 following the death of Larry Uteck, a former athletic director at Saint Mary's University.

== History ==
The Atlantic Bowl was traditionally a match between the champions of Atlantic University Sport (and its various predecessors) and a conference-winning team from central Canada. It had been hosted in Halifax, Nova Scotia annually since 1956, often at Huskies Stadium, home to the Saint Mary's Huskies. There were exceptions to Halifax as the host city. In 1976, the Acadia Axemen hosted the game at Raymond Field. The second was in 1983 when the game was scheduled to be hosted by the Canada West champion. The AUAA withdrew from national competition and participation in the game due to the relocation from Halifax. As a result, the Calgary Dinos advanced to the Vanier Cup by virtue of their Hardy Trophy win over UBC.

The Atlantic Bowl champions would receive the Robert L. Stanfield trophy, a trophy named after the former leader of Her Majesty's Official Opposition.

Traditionally, the winners of Atlantic University Sport would face one of the other three conference champions, with the other two meeting in the Churchill Bowl.

== List of Atlantic Bowl Championships ==
Year	Champions	Score	Runner up	Score	Location	Don Loney Trophy (MVP) Winner
1956	Hamilton Jrs.	21	Greenwood Army	7	Halifax, N.S.	
1957	Shearwater Navy	12	Brantford	7	Halifax, N.S.	
1958	Fort William	10	St. Francis Xavier X-Men	0	Halifax, N.S.	
1959	St. Francis Xavier X-Men	26	Ontario Agricultural College	14	Halifax, N.S.	
1960	St. Francis Xavier X-Men	21	Ottawa Gee-Gees	6	Halifax, N.S.	
1961	St. Francis Xavier X-Men	14	McMaster Marauders	0	Halifax, N.S.	
1962	Toronto Varsity Blues	20	St. Francis Xavier X-Men	14	Halifax, N.S.	
1963	St. Francis Xavier X-Men	15	Toronto Varsity Blues	9	Halifax, N.S.	
1964	Saint Mary's Huskies	15	McMaster Marauders	1	Halifax, N.S.	
1965	No Competition					
1966	No Competition					
1967	McMaster Marauders	7	St. Francis Xavier X-Men	0	Halifax, N.S.	
1968	Waterloo Lutheran (Wilfrid Laurier)	37	Saint Mary's Huskies	7	Halifax, N.S.	
1969	McGill Redmen	20	UNB Varsity Reds	6	Halifax, N.S.	
1970	Ottawa Gee-Gees	24	UNB Varsity Reds	13	Huskies Stadium, Halifax	
1971	Western Mustangs	44	Saint Mary's Huskies	13	Huskies Stadium, Halifax	
1972	Waterloo Lutheran (Wilfrid Laurier)	50	Saint Mary's Huskies	17	Huskies Stadium, Halifax	
1973	Saint Mary's Huskies	19	Wilfrid Laurier Golden Hawks	17	Huskies Stadium, Halifax	
1974	Toronto Varsity Blues	45	Saint Mary's Huskies	1	Huskies Stadium, Halifax	
1975	Calgary Dinos	38	Acadia Axemen	16	Huskies Stadium, Halifax	Dan Diduck, Calgary
1976	Acadia Axemen	18	Ottawa Gee-Gees	16	Raymond Field, Wolfville	Mike Murphy, Ottawa
1977	Acadia Axemen	35	Queen's Golden Gaels	22	Huskies Stadium, Halifax	Hubert Walsh, Acadia
1978	Queen's Golden Gaels	31	St. Francis Xavier X-Men	10	Huskies Stadium, Halifax	Jim Rutka, Queen's
1979	Acadia Axemen	23	Alberta Golden Bears	7	Huskies Stadium, Halifax	John Stevens, Acadia
1980	Ottawa Gee-Gees	28	Acadia Axemen	8	Huskies Stadium, Halifax	Mike Giftopoulos, Ottawa
1981	Acadia Axemen	40	Queen's Golden Gaels	14	Huskies Stadium, Halifax	Larry Priestnall, Acadia
1982	UBC Thunderbirds	54	St. Francis Xavier X-Men	1	Huskies Stadium, Halifax	Glenn Steele, UBC
1983	Calgary Dinos	0	AUAA Forfeits on protest of game location	0	McMahon Stadium, Calgary	No winner
1984	Mount Allison Mounties	33	Queen's Golden Gaels	11	Huskies Stadium, Halifax	Paul Henry, Mount Allison
1985	Western Mustangs	34	Mount Allison Mounties	3	Huskies Stadium, Halifax	Blake Marshall, Western
1986	Western Mustangs	29	Acadia Axemen	22	Huskies Stadium, Halifax	Blake Marshall, Western
1987	McGill Redmen	30	Saint Mary's Huskies	29	Huskies Stadium, Halifax	Jim Fitzsimmons, St. Mary's
1988	Saint Mary's Huskies	44	Bishop's Gaiters	10	Huskies Stadium, Halifax	Chris Flynn, St. Mary's
1989	Western Mustangs	38	Saint Mary's Huskies	33	Huskies Stadium, Halifax	Duane Forde, Western
1990	Saint Mary's Huskies	31	Western Mustangs	30	Huskies Stadium, Halifax	Chris Flynn, St. Mary's
1991	Mount Allison Mounties	31	Saskatchewan Huskies	14	Huskies Stadium, Halifax	Sean Hickey, Mount Allison
1992	Saint Mary's Huskies	21	Calgary Dinos	11	Huskies Stadium, Halifax	Brian Johnson, St. Mary's
1993	Calgary Dinos	37	Saint Mary's Huskies	23	Huskies Stadium, Halifax	James Buchanan, Calgary
1994	Saskatchewan Huskies	35	Saint Mary's Huskies	24	Huskies Stadium, Halifax	Brent Schneider, Saskatchewan
1995	Western Mustangs	55	Acadia Axemen	45	Huskies Stadium, Halifax	Sean Reade, Western
1996	St. Francis Xavier X-Men	13	Ottawa Gee-Gees	5	Huskies Stadium, Halifax	Jacob Marini, St. FX
1997	UBC Thunderbirds	34	Mount Allison Mounties	29	Huskies Stadium, Halifax	Shawn Olson, UBC
1998	Concordia Stingers	25	Acadia Axemen	24	Huskies Stadium, Halifax	Dave Miller-Johnston, Concordia
1999	Saint Mary's Huskies	21	Waterloo Warriors	14	Huskies Stadium, Halifax	Dean Jones, St. Mary's
2000	Regina Rams	40	Saint Mary's Huskies	36	Huskies Stadium, Halifax	Neal Hughes, Regina
2001	Saint Mary's Huskies	48	Laval Rouge et Or	8	Huskies Stadium, Halifax	Joe Bonaventura, St. Mary's

== Team Win/Loss records ==
Team	GP	W	L	Win %
McGill Redmen	2	2	0	1.000
UBC Thunderbirds	2	2	0	1.000
Concordia Stingers	1	1	0	1.000
Fort William	1	1	0	1.000
Hamilton Jrs.	1	1	0	1.000
Regina Rams	1	1	0	1.000
Shearwater Navy	1	1	0	1.000
Western Mustangs	6	5	1	.833
Calgary Dinos	4	3	1	.750
Toronto Varsity Blues	3	2	1	.666
Wilfrid Laurier Golden Hawks (Waterloo Lutheran)	3	2	1	.666
Mount Allison Mounties	4	2	2	.500
Saskatchewan Huskies	2	1	1	.500
St. Francis Xavier X-Men	11	5	6	.455
Acadia Axemen	9	4	5	.444
Saint Mary's Huskies	16	7	9	.438
Ottawa Gee-Gees	5	2	3	.400
McMaster Marauders	3	1	2	.333
Queen's Golden Gaels	4	1	3	.250
Alberta Golden Bears	1	0	1	.000
Bishop's Gaiters	1	0	1	.000
Brantford	1	0	1	.000
Greenwood Army	1	0	1	.000
Laval Rouge et Or	1	0	1	.000
Ontario Agricultural College	1	0	1	.000
Waterloo Warriors	1	0	1	.000
UNB Varsity Reds	2	0	2	.000
