= 2002 CIS football season =

- Duration: August 27, 2002 – October 27, 2002
- Hardy Cup champions: Saskatchewan Huskies
- Yates Cup champions: McMaster Marauders
- Dunsmore Cup champions: McGill Redmen
- Loney Bowl champions: Saint Mary's Huskies
- Mitchell Bowl champions: Saskatchewan Huskies
- Churchill Bowl champions: Saint Mary's Huskies

Vanier Cup
- Date: November 23, 2002
- Venue: SkyDome, Toronto
- Champions: Saint Mary's Huskies

CIS football seasons seasons
- 2001 2003

The 2002 CIS football season began on August 27, 2002, and concluded with the 38th Vanier Cup national championship on November 23 at the SkyDome in Toronto, Ontario, with the Saint Mary's Huskies winning their second consecutive championship and third overall. Twenty-six universities across Canada competed in CIS football this season, the highest level of amateur play in Canadian football, under the auspices of the Canadian Interuniversity Sport (CIS).

== Awards and records ==
=== Awards ===
- Hec Crighton Trophy – Tommy Denison, Queen's
- Presidents' Trophy – Adam MacDonald, St. Francis Xavier
- Russ Jackson Award – Lincoln Blumell, Calgary Dinos
- J. P. Metras Trophy – Israel Idonije, Manitoba
- Peter Gorman Trophy – Andy Fantuz, Western Ontario

== All-Canadian team ==
=== First team ===
==== Offence ====
- QB Tommy Denison, Queen's
- RB Kyle Pyear, McMaster
- RB Dean Jones, St. Mary's
- WR Andy Fantuz, Western
- WR Andrew Noel, Acadia
- IR Andrew Sharp, Manitoba
- IR Brad Smith, Queen's
- OT François Boulianne, Laval
- OT Brock Flemming, Ottawa
- OG Jim Merrick, McGill
- OG Dave Forde, McMaster
- C Chris Bochen, Manitoba

==== Defence ====
- DE Paul Brown, StFX
- DE Stephen Young, McGill
- DT Israel Idonije, Manitoba
- DT Miguel Robede, Laval
- LB Adam MacDonald, StFX
- LB Javier Glatt, UBC
- LB Ray Mariuz, McMaster
- CB Richard Karikari, StFX
- CB Boyd Barrett, Manitoba
- DB Art Tolhurst, UBC
- DB Matthieu Proulx, Laval
- FS David Aiken, Concordia

==== Special teams ====
- K Jamie Boreham, Manitoba
- P Jon Ryan, Regina

=== Second Team ===
==== Offence ====
- QB Shane Munson, Manitoba
- RB Neal Hughes, Regina
- RB Nick Hoffmann, McGill
- WR Jamie Elliott, Calgary
- WR Jason Currie, St. Mary's
- IR Dave Stala, St. Mary's
- IR Blake Machan, Calgary
- OT Steve Morley, St. Mary's
- OT Fabio Filice, McMaster
- OG Darren Presley, Calgary
- OG Daniel Frame, Acadia
- C Jonathon Landon, Queen's

==== Defence ====
- DE Warren Doepker, Manitoba
- DE Jeet Rana, York
- DT Nicholas Comly, Acadia
- DT Tyler Lynem, Calgary
- LB Mike Mahoney, McGill
- LB Sebastien Roy, Mt Allison
- LB Joey Mikawoz, Manitoba
- CB Pascal Masson, Laval
- CB Kwame Aidoo, McMaster
- DB Dennis Mavrin, York
- DB Brandon Little, McMaster
- FS Sandy Beveridge, UBC

==== Special teams ====
- K Michel Ray, McMaster
- P Anand Pillai, McGill

== Results ==
=== Regular-season standings ===
Note: GP = Games Played, W = Wins, L = Losses, OTL = Overtime Losses, PF = Points For, PA = Points Against, Pts = Points

Canada West
Team	GP	W	L	OTL	PF	PA	Pts
**Manitoba**	8	8	0	0	271	119	16
**Calgary**	8	5	3	1	195	215	11
**Regina**	8	5	3	0	169	153	10
**Saskatchewan**	8	4	4	0	162	159	8
UBC	8	3	5	0	144	141	6
Simon Fraser	8	2	6	0	110	219	4
Alberta	8	1	7	0	141	186	2

Ontario
Team	GP	W	L	OTL	PF	PA	Pts
**McMaster**	8	8	0	0	310	100	16
**Queen's**	8	7	1	0	261	102	14
**Western**	8	6	2	0	286	146	12
**Ottawa**	8	5	3	0	218	152	10
**York**	8	5	3	0	121	113	10
**Waterloo**	8	3	5	0	111	178	6
**Windsor**	8	3	5	0	109	202	6
**Guelph**	8	2	6	0	102	237	4
Laurier	8	1	7	0	150	137	2
Toronto	8	0	8	0	63	364	0

Quebec
Team	GP	W	L	PF	PA	Pts
**McGill**	8	7	1	299	93	14
**Laval**	8	6	2	311	124	12
**Concordia**	8	4	4	217	184	8
**Bishop's**	8	2	6	143	270	4
Montreal	8	0	8	62	359	0

Atlantic
Team	GP	W	L	PF	PA	Pts
**Saint Mary's**	8	6	2	313	110	12
**StFX**	8	6	2	215	134	12
**Acadia**	8	4	4	205	215	8
Mount Allison	8	1	7	58	334	2

Teams in bold have earned playoff berths.

=== Top 10 ===
CIS Top 10 Rankings
Team \ Week	1	2	3	4	5	6	7	8	9
Acadia Axemen	NR	10	7	9	6	4	9	NR	NR
Alberta Golden Bears	NR	NR	NR	NR	NR	NR	NR	NR	NR
Bishop's Gaiters	NR	NR	NR	NR	NR	NR	NR	NR	NR
Calgary Dinos	9	9	9	NR	10	10	10	NR	10
Concordia Stingers	8	7	NR	NR	NR	NR	NR	NR	NR
Guelph Gryphons	NR	NR	NR	NR	NR	NR	NR	NR	NR
Laurier Golden Hawks	NR	NR	NR	NR	NR	NR	NR	NR	NR
Laval Rouge et Or	3	3	5	5	5	3	7	6	6
Manitoba Bisons	2	2	2	2	1	1	1	1	1
McGill Redmen	NR	NR	NR	10	9	8	5	4	4
McMaster Marauders	5	4	3	3	2	2	2	2	2
Montreal Carabins	NR	NR	NR	NR	NR	NR	NR	NR	NR
Mount Allison Mounties	NR	NR	NR	NR	NR	NR	NR	NR	NR
Ottawa Gee-Gees	4	8	8	7	NR	NR	NR	10	NR
Queen's Golden Gaels	NR	NR	10	8	8	7	4	3	3
Regina Rams	6	5	4	4	4	5	8	9	9
Saint Mary's Huskies	1	1	1	1	3	9	6	5	5
Saskatchewan Huskies	10	NR	NR	NR	NR	NR	NR	NR	NR
Simon Fraser Clan	NR	NR	NR	NR	NR	NR	NR	NR	NR
St. Francis Xavier X-Men	NR	NR	NR	NR	NR	NR	NR	8	8
Toronto Varsity Blues	NR	NR	NR	NR	NR	NR	NR	NR	NR
UBC Thunderbirds	NR	NR	NR	NR	NR	NR	NR	NR	NR
Waterloo Warriors	NR	NR	NR	NR	NR	NR	NR	NR	NR
Western Mustangs	7	6	6	6	7	6	3	7	7
Windsor Lancers	NR	NR	NR	NR	NR	NR	NR	NR	NR
York Lions	NR	NR	NR	NR	NR	NR	NR	NR	NR

Ranks in italics are teams not ranked in the top 10 poll but received votes.
NR = Not ranked. Source:

=== Championships ===
The Vanier Cup was played between the champions of the Mitchell Bowl and the Churchill Bowl, the national semi-final games. In 2002, the Mitchell Bowl replaced the long-standing Atlantic Bowl that had traditionally seen Huskies Stadium in Halifax host the annual game. This was done to increase competitive fairness in the CIAU. The Ontario conference's Yates Cup championship team hosted the winners of the Atlantic conference Loney Bowl championship for the Churchill Bowl. The winners of the Canada West conference Hardy Trophy visited the Dunsmore Cup Quebec champion for the Mitchell Bowl.
