= Hec Crighton Trophy =

Canadian university football player award

- Sport: Canadian football
- League: U Sports football
- Awarded for: Most outstanding player in the league

History
- First award: 1967
- First winner: Mike Eben, Toronto Varsity Blues
- Most wins: Chris Flynn (3 times)
- Most recent: Ethan Jordan, Wilfrid Laurier Golden Hawks
- Website: usports.ca

The Hec Crighton Trophy (sometimes referred to as the Hec Crighton Award) is awarded annually to the most outstanding Canadian football player in U Sports. The trophy is named after Hec Crighton who was a former teacher, coach, referee, and the author of the Official Football Rule Book as well as the U Sports Rule Book. It was first presented in 1967 by the board of directors of the Canadian College Bowl.

It is the Canadian equivalent of the American NCAA Heisman Trophy.

The Western Mustangs have produced the most Hec Crighton winners with seven as well as the most individual winners with six (Tim Tindale won the award twice). Chris Flynn has won the Hec Crighton Trophy three times, consecutively, while no other player has won the award more than twice.

Of the 27 active U Sports football programs, seven teams have not had a player win the award.

== List of winners ==
Year	Winner	Pos	School
1967	Mike Eben	Rec	Toronto Varsity Blues
1968	Mike Raham	RB	Toronto Varsity Blues
1969	Dave Fleiszer	FB	McGill Redmen
1970	Paul Paddon	QB	Ottawa Gee-Gees
1971	Mel Smith	Rec	Alberta Golden Bears
1972	Andrew Parici	QB	Windsor Lancers
1973	Dave Pickett	QB	Saskatchewan Huskies
1974	Al Charuk	FS	Acadia Axemen
1975	Brian Fryer	Rec	Alberta Golden Bears
1976	Bob Stracina	Rec/K	Acadia Axemen
1977	Bob Cameron	QB/P/K	Acadia Axemen
1978	Jamie Bone	QB	Western Mustangs
1979	Scott Mallender	QB	Windsor Lancers
1980	Greg Marshall	RB	Western Mustangs
1981	Dan Feraday	QB	Toronto Varsity Blues
1982	Rick Zmich	QB	Ottawa Gee-Gees
1983	Greg Vavra	QB	Calgary Dinos
1984	Phil Scarfone	QB	McMaster Marauders
1985	Larry Mohr	RB	Queen's Golden Gaels
1986	Blake Marshall	RB	Western Mustangs
1987	Jordan Gagner	QB	UBC Thunderbirds
1988	Chris Flynn	QB	Saint Mary's Huskies
1989	Chris Flynn	QB	Saint Mary's Huskies
1990	Chris Flynn	QB	Saint Mary's Huskies
1991	Tim Tindale	RB	Western Mustangs
1992	Eugene Buccigrossi	QB	Toronto Varsity Blues
1993	Tim Tindale	RB	Western Mustangs
1994	Bill Kubas	QB	Wilfrid Laurier Golden Hawks
1995	Don Blair	Rec	Calgary Dinos
1996	Éric Lapointe	RB	Mount Allison Mounties
1997	Mark Nohra	RB	UBC Thunderbirds
1998	Éric Lapointe	RB	Mount Allison Mounties
1999	Phil Côté	QB	Ottawa Gee-Gees
2000	Kojo Aidoo	RB	McMaster Marauders
2001	Ben Chapdelaine	QB	McMaster Marauders
2002	Tommy Denison	QB	Queen's Golden Gaels
2003	Tommy Denison	QB	Queen's Golden Gaels
2004	Jesse Lumsden	RB	McMaster Marauders
2005	Andy Fantuz	Rec	Western Mustangs
2006	Daryl Stephenson	RB	Windsor Lancers
2007	Erik Glavic	QB	Saint Mary's Huskies
2008	Benoit Groulx	QB	Laval Rouge et Or
2009	Erik Glavic	QB	Calgary Dinos
2010	Brad Sinopoli	QB	Ottawa Gee-Gees
2011	Billy Greene	QB	UBC Thunderbirds
2012	Kyle Quinlan	QB	McMaster Marauders
2013	Jordan Heather	QB	Bishop's Gaiters
2014	Andrew Buckley	QB	Calgary Dinos
2015	Andrew Buckley	QB	Calgary Dinos
2016	Noah Picton	QB	Regina Rams
2017	Ed Ilnicki	RB	Alberta Golden Bears
2018	Adam Sinagra	QB	Calgary Dinos
2019	Chris Merchant	QB	Western Mustangs
2021	Tre Ford	QB	Waterloo Warriors
2022	Kevin Mital	WR	Laval Rouge et Or
2023	Jonathan Sénécal	QB	Montreal Carabins
2024	Taylor Elgersma	QB	Wilfrid Laurier Golden Hawks
2025	Ethan Jordan	WR	Wilfrid Laurier Golden Hawks

== Trophies by team ==
School	Trophies
Western	7
Calgary	6
McMaster	5
Ottawa	4
Saint Mary's	4
Toronto	4
Windsor	3
Alberta	3
Acadia	3
Queen's	3
UBC	3
Wilfrid Laurier	3
Laval	2
Mount Allison	2
Bishop's	1
Regina	1
Saskatchewan	1
Waterloo	1
Montreal	1
McGill	1

Seven active teams have never had a player win the Hec Crighton Trophy: Carleton Ravens (OUA), Concordia Stingers (RSEQ), Guelph Gryphons (OUA) Manitoba Bisons (CanWest), Sherbrooke Vert-et-Or (RSEQ), St. Francis Xavier X-Men (AUS), and York Lions/Yeomen (OUA).

== See also ==
- J. P. Metras Trophy
- Presidents' Trophy
- Peter Gorman Trophy
- Russ Jackson Award
- Jon Cornish Trophy – similar award presented to the top Canadian player in NCAA (American) football
