= 32nd Vanier Cup =

1996 Canadian university football championship

Saskatchewan Huskies	St. Francis Xavier X-Men
(7–1)	(6–2)
31	12
Head coach: Brian Towriss	Head coach: John Stevens
	1	2	3	4	Total
Saskatchewan Huskies	0	0	7	24	31
St. Francis Xavier X-Men	3	9	0	0	12
- Date: November 30, 1996
- Stadium: SkyDome
- Location: Toronto
- Ted Morris Memorial Trophy: Brent Schneider, Saskatchewan
- Bruce Coulter Award: Warren Muzika, Saskatchewan
- Attendance: 14,577

The 32nd Vanier Cup was played on November 30, 1996, at the SkyDome in Toronto, Ontario, and determined the CIAU football champion for the 1996 season. The Saskatchewan Huskies claimed their second championship, defeating the St. Francis Xavier X-Men with a score of 31–12.
