= Chris Flynn (Canadian football) =

Canadian football player (born 1966)

No. 1, 16
- Positions: Quarterback, wide receiver, safety

Personal information
- Born: November 17, 1966 (age 59); Ottawa, Ontario, Canada
- Listed height: 6 ft 0 in (1.83 m)
- Listed weight: 190 lb (86 kg)

Career information
- University: Saint Mary's
- CFL draft: 1991: 5th round, 35th overall pick

Career history
- Montreal Machine (1991–1992); Toronto Argonauts (1993)*; Fighters de Croissy sur Seine (1993–1996); Ottawa Rough Riders (1996)
- * Offseason or practice squad member only

Awards and highlights
- 3× Hec Crighton Trophy (1988, 1989, 1990)
- Canadian Football Hall of Fame (Class of 2011)

Chris Flynn (born November 17, 1966) is a Canadian former football player. He played CIAU football for the Saint Mary's Huskies as a quarterback, and is the only player to win the Hec Crighton Trophy three times.

== Early life ==
Chris Flynn was born on November 17, 1966, in Ottawa, Ontario. He played quarterback for the Saint Mary's Huskies from 1987 to 1990 and was a three-time All-Canadian. He is the only player to win the Hec Crighton Trophy three times as the most valuable player in Canadian university football.

== Professional career ==
Flynn was selected by the Ottawa Rough Riders in the fifth round, with the 35th overall pick, of the 1991 CFL draft. He instead played for the Montreal Machine of the World League of American Football during the 1991 season, appearing in one game at quarterback while rushing once for eight yards and being sacked for an eight-yard loss. Flynn converted to wide receiver in 1992. He caught three passes for 72 yards for the Machine during the 1992 season.

Flynn signed with the CFL's Toronto Argonauts in 1993 but was released before ever playing for them.

Flynn signed with the Championnat Élite Division 1 in France where he played for 4 seasons (1993–1996) for the Fighters de Croissy sur Seine. During these years, he was a star of the French championship with an annual salary slightly less than 30,000 Euros.

Flynn then played his last season for the CFL's Ottawa Rough Riders in 1996 as a safety. He dressed in three games for the Rough Riders and posted one special teams tackle.

== Legacy ==
Flynn was inducted into the Saint Mary's Hall of Fame in 2001, inducted into the Canadian Football Hall of Fame in 2011, and inducted into the Nova Scotia Sport Hall of Fame in 2015. He was voted in a Sportsnet poll as the #1 university football player of the past 50 years. In 2019, Flynn's #1 jersey was the first jersey retired in the 217-year history of Saint Mary's University. In 2021, TSN's Gridiron Nation show voted Flynn as the all-time "Great Canadian Goat" in Canadian University football history.

In 1994, Flynn received a Medal of Honor for Courage and Bravery for saving a young woman from drowning in the Seine river in France.
