= Hardy Trophy =

Canadian sport trophy

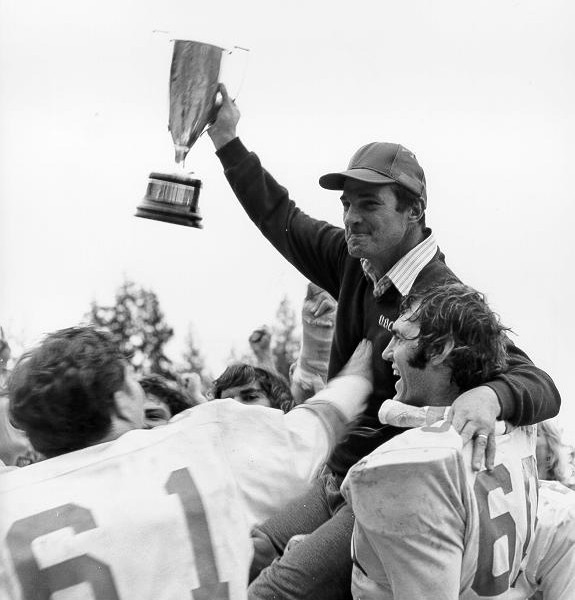
- UBC head coach Frank Smith with the original Hardy Trophy in 1978.
- Sport: Canadian football
- League: U Sports football
- Awarded for: Champion team of Canada West Conference
- Country: Canada

History
- First award: 1922
- Editions: 89
- First winner: Alberta Green and Gold
- Most wins: Saskatchewan Huskies (21)
- Most recent: UBC Thunderbirds
- Website: www.canadawest.org/sports/fball/index

The Hardy Trophy is a Canadian sport trophy, presented annually to the winner of the Canada West Universities Athletic Association Football Conference of U Sports, the country's governing body for university athletics. It is named for Evan Hardy, the former head of the agricultural engineering department at the University of Saskatchewan, who had played for the Huskies for its first five years before a rule that only students could play. Hardy continued on as coach and created a western university league. The original trophy was replaced in 1997 after it fell apart during an on-field celebration of the Huskies win in 1996 at home at Griffiths Stadium. The original Hardy trophy was unearthed beneath a pile of storage boxes in 2008 at the University of Saskatchewan. Since 2018, the trophy has been with Canada West conference staff, and has occasionally been displayed at conference football events.

The winner of the Hardy Trophy goes on to play in either the Uteck Bowl or the Mitchell Bowl, depending on annual rotations.

The game in which the Hardy Trophy is awarded to the winner is often referred to as the Hardy Cup.

== Game/regular season results ==
Date played		Winner		Finalist		Location	Attendance
November 4 & 11, 1922	1st	Alberta Green and Gold (Note: Alberta Green and Gold, later known as the "University of Alberta Golden Bears") (1)	26	Saskatchewan	7	Saskatoon/Edmonton (Note: Two-game total-point series)	1,000 (Note: At Varsity Grid, Edmonton)
1923	2nd	Manitoba (1)	-	-	-	-	-
1924	3rd	Manitoba (2)	-	-	-	-	-
1926	4th	Alberta Green and Gold (2)	-	-	-	-	-
1927	5th	Manitoba (3)	-	-	-	-	-
November 10, 1928	6th	Alberta Golden Bears(3)	12	Saskatchewan	6	Carins Field, Saskatoon	n/a
November 20, 1929	7th	UBC Blue and Gold (Note: UBC Blue and Gold later known as the "UBC Thunderbirds") (1)	13	Saskatchewan	2	Athletic Park, Vancouver	6,000
1930	8th	Saskatchewan (1)	-	-	-	-	-
November 13, 1931	9th	UBC Blue and Gold (2)	4	Manitoba	3	Athletic Park, Vancouver	5,000
November 11, 1933	10th	UBC Blue and Gold (3)	12	Alberta Golden Bears	5	Athletic Park, Vancouver	2,500
1934	11th	Saskatchewan Huskies(2)	-	-	-	Regular season winner	-
1935	12th	Saskatchewan Huskies (3)	-	-	-	Regular season winner	-
1936	13th	Saskatchewan Huskies (4)	-	-	-	Regular season winner	-
1937	14th	Saskatchewan Huskies (5)	-	-	-	Regular season winner	-
1938	15th	UBC Thunderbirds (4)	-	-	-	Regular season winner	-
1939	16th	UBC Thunderbirds(5)	-	-	-	Regular season winner	-
1941	17th	Saskatchewan Huskies (6)	-	-	-	Regular season winner	-
1944	18th	Alberta Golden Bears (4)	-	-	-	Regular season winner	-
1945	19th	UBC Thunderbirds (6)	36	Alberta Golden Bears	4	Athletic Park, Vancouver	-
1946	20th	Alberta Golden Bears (5)	-	-	-	Regular season winner	-
1947	21st	Alberta Golden Bears (6)	-	-	-	Regular season winner	-
1948	22nd	Alberta Golden Bears (7)	-	-	-	Regular season winner	-
1959	23rd	UBC Thunderbirds (7)	-	-	-	Regular season winner	-
1960	24th	Alberta Golden Bears (8)	-	-	-	Regular season winner	-
1961	25th	UBC Thunderbirds (8)	-	-	-	Regular season winner	-
1962 (Note: Shared title)	26th	Alberta Golden Bears; UBC Thunderbirds	-	-	-	Regular season winner	-
1963	27th	Alberta Golden Bears (9)	-	-	-	Regular season winner	-
1964	28th	Alberta Golden Bears (10)	-	-	-	Regular season winner	-
1965	29th	Manitoba Bisons (4)	-	-	-	Regular season winner	-
1966	30th	Alberta Golden Bears; Manitoba Bisons; Saskatchewan Huskies	-	-	-	Regular season winner	-
1967	31st	Alberta Golden Bears (11)	-	-	-	Regular season winner	-
1968	32nd	Manitoba Bisons (5)	-	-	-	Regular season winner	-
1969	33rd	Manitoba Bisons (6)	-	-	-	Regular season winner	-
1970	34th	Manitoba Bisons (7)	-	-	-	Regular season winner	-
1971	35th	Alberta Golden Bears (12)	-	-	-	Regular season winner	-
1972	36th	Alberta Golden Bears (13)	-	-	-	Regular season winner	-
1973	37th	Manitoba Bisons (8)	-	-	-	Regular season winner	-
1974	38th	Saskatchewan Huskies (7)	-	-	-	Regular season winner	-
1975	39th	Calgary Dinosaurs (1)	-	-	-	Regular season winner	-
November 6, 1976	40th	UBC Thunderbirds (9)	36	Saskatchewan Huskies	10	Thunderbird Stadium, Vancouver	3,000
November 5, 1977	41st	Calgary Dinosaurs (2)	13	UBC Thunderbirds	12	McMahon Stadium, Calgary	u/a
November 4, 1978	42nd	UBC Thunderbirds (10)	26	Calgary Dinosaurs	8	Thunderbird Stadium, Vancouver	3,300
November 3, 1979	43rd	Alberta Golden Bears (14)	28	UBC Thunderbirds	17	Varsity Stadium, Edmonton	4,000
November 8, 1980	44th	Alberta Golden Bears (15)	22	Calgary Dinosaurs	14	Varsity Stadium, Edmonton	4,000
November 13, 1981	45th	Alberta Golden Bears (16)	11	UBC Thunderbirds	8	Thunderbird Stadium, Vancouver	3,000
November 5, 1982	46th	UBC Thunderbirds (11)	57	Manitoba Bisons	3	Thunderbird Stadium, Vancouver	2,700
November 11, 1983	47th	Calgary Dinosaurs (3)	21	UBC Thunderbirds	12	McMahon Stadium, Calgary	n/a
November 10, 1984	48th	Calgary Dinosaurs (4)	33	Alberta Golden Bears	16	Varsity Stadium, Edmonton	3,500
November 9, 1985	49th	Calgary Dinosaurs (5)	52	Manitoba Bisons	13	McMahon Stadium, Calgary	n/a
November 7, 1986	50th	UBC Thunderbirds (12)	49	Calgary Dinosaurs	3	Thunderbird Stadium, Vancouver	3,600
November 6, 1987	51st	UBC Thunderbirds (13)	26	Alberta Golden Bears	8	Thunderbird Stadium, Vancouver	3,300
November 5, 1988	52nd	Calgary Dinosaurs (6)	46	Saskatchewan Huskies	33 (Note: Overtime game)	McMahon Stadium, Calgary	n/a
November 11, 1989	53rd	Saskatchewan Huskies (8)	22	UBC Thunderbirds	18	Griffiths Stadium, Saskatoon	n/a
November 10, 1990	54th	Saskatchewan Huskies (9)	24	UBC Thuunderbirds	9	Griffiths Stadium, Saskatoon	n/a
November 9, 1991	55th	Saskatchewan Huskies (10)	23	Manitoba Bisons	11	University Stadium, Winnipeg	n/a
November 7, 1992	56th	Calgary Dinos (7)	26	UBC Thunderbirds	24	Thunderbird Stadium, Vancouver	2,800
November 5, 1993	57th	Calgary Dinos (8)	32	Alberta Golden Bears	12	McMahon Stadium, Calgary	n/a
November 5, 1994	58th	Saskatchewan Huskies (11)	34	Calgary Dinos	17	Griffiths Stadium, Saskatoon	n/a
November 10, 1995	59th	Calgary Dinos (9)	32	Saskatchewan Huskies	30	McMahon Stadium, Calgary	n/a
November 9, 1996	60th	Saskatchewan Huskies (12)	37	UBC Thunderbirds	16	Griffiths Stadium, Saskatoon	n/a
November 7, 1997	61st	UBC Thunderbirds (14)	39	Calgary Dinos	21	Thunderbird Stadium, Vancouver	3,100
November 14, 1998	62nd	Saskatchewan Huskies (13)	31	UBC Thunderbirds	28	Griffiths Stadium, Saskatoon	n/a
November 12, 1999	63rd	Saskatchewan Huskies (14)	31	UBC Thunderbirds	24	Griffiths Stadium, Saskatoon	n/a
November 11, 2000	64th	Regina Rams (1)	25	Manitoba Bisons	22	University Stadium, Winnipeg	4,200
November 11, 2001	65th	Manitoba Bisons (9)	23	Regina Rams	16	Winnipeg Stadium, Winnipeg	3,000
November 9, 2002	66th	Saskatchewan Huskies (15)	44	Regina Rams	28	Taylor Field, Regina	5,612
November 8, 2003	67th	Simon Fraser Clan(1)	28	Alberta Golden Bears	18	Swangard Stadium, Burnaby, BC	1,900
November 13, 2004	68th	Saskatchewan Huskies (16)	21	Alberta Golden Bears	20	Foote Field, Edmonton	2,714
November 12, 2005	69th	Saskatchewan Huskies (17)	30	Alberta Golden Bears	17	Griffiths Stadium, Saskatoon	2,811
November 11, 2006	70th	Saskatchewan Huskies (18)	32	Manitoba Bisons	15	Canad Inns Stadium, Winnipeg	4,700
November 10, 2007	71st	Manitoba Bisons (10)	48	Regina Rams	5	CanadInns Stadium	1,750
November 8, 2008	72nd	Calgary Dinos (10)	44	Simon Fraser Clan	21	McMahon Stadium, Calgary	2,168
November 14, 2009	73rd	Calgary Dinos (11)	39	Saskatchewan Huskies	38	Griffiths Stadium, Saskatoon	5,186
November 13, 2010	74th	Calgary Dinos (12)	56	Alberta Golden Bears	3	McMahon Stadium, Calgary	2,786
November 11, 2011	75th	Calgary Dinos (13)	62	UBC Thunderbirds	13 (Note: UBC vacated game due to the use of an illegal player)	McMahon Stadium, Calgary	1,712
November 10, 2012	76th	Calgary Dinos (14)	38	Regina Rams	14	McMahon Stadium, Calgary	2,164
November 9, 2013	77th	Calgary Dinos (15)	43	Manitoba Bisons	28	McMahon Stadium, Calgary	1,024
November 15, 2014	78th	Manitoba Bisons (11)	27	Calgary Dinos	15	McMahon Stadium, Calgary	1,032
November 14, 2015	79th	UBC Thunderbirds (15)	34	Calgary Dinos	26	McMahon Stadium, Calgary	1,738
November 12, 2016	80th	Calgary Dinos (16)	46	UBC Thunderbirds	43	McMahon Stadium, Calgary	1,834
November 11, 2017	81st	Calgary Dinos (17)	44	UBC Thunderbirds	43	McMahon Stadium, Calgary	1,538
November 10, 2018	82nd	Saskatchewan Huskies (19)	43	Calgary Dinos	18	McMahon Stadium, Calgary	1,744
November 9, 2019	83rd	Calgary Dinos (18)	29	Saskatchewan Huskies	4	McMahon Stadium, Calgary	1,263
November 20, 2021	84th	Saskatchewan Huskies (20)	45	Manitoba Bisons	17	Griffiths Stadium, Saskatoon	2,500
November 12, 2022	85th	Saskatchewan Huskies (21)	23	UBC Thunderbirds	8	Griffiths Stadium, Saskatoon	1,916
November 11, 2023	86th	UBC Thunderbirds (16)	28	Alberta Golden Bears	27	Thunderbird Stadium, Vancouver	1,966
November 9, 2024	87th	Regina Rams (2)	19	Saskatchewan Huskies	14	Griffiths Stadium, Saskatoon	6,355
November 8, 2025	88th	Saskatchewan Huskies (22)	25	Regina Rams	24	Griffiths Stadium, Saskatoon	3,201
November 14, 2026	89th	UBC Thunderbirds (17)	41	Regina Rams	39	Thunderbird Stadium, Vancouver	1,552

== Wins ==
- Saskatchewan Huskies - 22 *(23)
- Calgary Dinos - 18
- Alberta Golden Bears - 16 *(18)
- UBC Thunderbirds - 17 *(18)
- Manitoba Bisons - 11 *(12)
- Regina Rams - 2
- Simon Fraser Clan - 1

( ) indicates the number of titles including years when the title was shared
