= Jewett Trophy =

Canadian sports trophy

- Awarded for: AUS champion in U Sports football
- First awarded: 1960
- Current champions: Saint Mary's Huskies
- Most titles: Saint Mary's Huskies (26)

The Jewett Trophy is a Canadian sports trophy, in honour of Dr. B. L. Jewett, presented annually to the winner of the Atlantic University Sport Football Conference of U Sports. Unlike the other three conference championship games, the game in which this trophy is awarded is not named for the trophy itself; it is known as the Loney Bowl, named after former St. Francis Xavier head coach Don Loney. The winner of the Jewett Trophy goes on to play in either the Uteck Bowl or the Mitchell Bowl, depending on annual rotations.

Note that prior to 1973, the championship was awarded to the first place team during the regular season.

== Winners ==
Year	Date	Champion	Score	Runner up	Score	Location	Game MVP
1960		St. Francis Xavier					
1961		St. Francis Xavier					
1962		St. Francis Xavier					
1963		St. Francis Xavier					
1964		Saint Mary's					
1965		Saint Mary's					
1966		St. Francis Xavier					
1967		St. Francis Xavier					
1968		Saint Mary's					
1969		UNB					
1970		UNB					
1971		Saint Mary's					
1972		Saint Mary's					
1973		Saint Mary's					
1974		Saint Mary's					
1975		Acadia					
1976		Acadia					
1977		Acadia					
1978		St. Francis Xavier					
1979		Acadia					
1980		Acadia					
1981		Acadia					
1982		St. Francis Xavier					
1983		St. Francis Xavier					
1984		Mount Allison					
1985		Mount Allison	16	Acadia	14		
1986		Acadia	29	St. Francis Xavier	13		
1987		Saint Mary's	30	Acadia	23		
1988		Saint Mary's	37	Acadia	35		
1989		Saint Mary's	46	Acadia	2		
1990		Saint Mary's	43	Mount Allison	8	Huskies Stadium	
1991		Mount Allison	25	Saint Mary's	24	MacAulay Field	
1992		Saint Mary's	32	Mount Allison	10	Huskies Stadium	
1993	Nov. 6	Saint Mary's	48	Acadia	28*	Huskies Stadium	
1994	Nov. 5	Saint Mary's	60	Acadia	14	Huskies Stadium	
1995	Nov 11	Acadia	13	St. Francis Xavier	8	Raymond Field	
1996	Nov 9	St. Francis Xavier	30	Mount Allison	22	Oland Stadium	
1997	Nov 8	Mount Allison	20	St. Francis Xavier	17	Oland Stadium	
1998	Nov 14	Acadia	35	Mount Allison	28	MacAulay Field	
1999	Nov 13	Saint Mary's	25	Acadia	24	Huskies Stadium	
2000	Nov 11	Saint Mary's	38	Acadia	18	Huskies Stadium	
2001	Nov 10	Saint Mary's	38	Acadia	7	Huskies Stadium	
2002	Nov 9	Saint Mary's	63	St. Francis Xavier	14	Huskies Stadium	Sebastien Clovis
2003	Nov 8	Saint Mary's	36	St. Francis Xavier	12	Huskies Stadium	Al Giacalone
2004	Nov 13	Saint Mary's	24	Acadia	7	Huskies Stadium	Al Giacalone
2005	Nov 12	Acadia	69	St. Francis Xavier	9	Raymond Field	Eric Nielsen
2006	Nov 11	Acadia	32	Saint Mary's	24	Raymond Field	Najja Coley
2007	Nov 10	Saint Mary's	25	St. Francis Xavier	24	Huskies Stadium	Erik Glavic
2008	Nov 8	Saint Mary's	29	St. Francis Xavier	27	Huskies Stadium	Jack Creighton
2009	Nov 14	Saint Mary's	31	St. Francis Xavier	22	Huskies Stadium	Craig Leger
2010	Nov 13	Saint Mary's	37	Acadia	8	Huskies Stadium	Ahmed Borhot
2011	Nov 12	Acadia	39	Saint Mary's	20	Raymond Field	Kyle Graves
2012	Nov 10	Acadia	17	Saint Mary's	9	Raymond Field	Thomas Troop
2013	Nov 9	Mount Allison	20	Saint Mary's	17	Huskies Stadium	Josh Blanchard
2014	Nov 8	Mount Allison	29	St. Francis Xavier	7	MacAulay Field	Josh Blanchard
2015	Nov 15	St. Francis Xavier	14	Mount Allison	12	MacAulay Field	Jonathan Heidebrecht
2016	Nov 12	St. Francis Xavier	29	Mount Allison	8	Oland Stadium	Christian Ridley
2017	Nov 14	Acadia	45*	Saint Mary's	38**	Raymond Field	Cameron Davidson
2018	Nov 10	St. Francis Xavier	33	Saint Mary's	9	Huskies Stadium	Jordan Socholotiuk
2019	Nov 9	Acadia	31	Bishop's	1	Raymond Field	Dale Wright
2020	Season cancelled due to the COVID-19 pandemic.						
2021	Nov 20	St. Francis Xavier	25	Bishop's	17	StFX Stadium	Silas Fagnan
2022	Nov 12	St. Francis Xavier	21	Mount Allison	14	StFX Stadium	Ben Harrington
2023	Nov 11	St. Francis Xavier	34	Bishop's	23	StFX Stadium	Caleb Fogarty
2024	Nov 9	Bishop's	25***	St. Mary's	22	Coulter Field	David Chaloux
2025	Nov 8	St. Mary's	46	St. Francis Xavier	11	Huskies Stadium	Keyshawn Beswick
2026	Nov 14	St. Mary's	28	St. Francis Xavier	15	Huskies Stadium	Reece Wyke

Note: Each MVP listed above played for the winning team, except where otherwise noted.

* Game was decided in overtime; ** Game was decided in double overtime; *** Game was decided in triple overtime

== Team win–loss records ==
Team	W	L	Win %
Saint Mary's Huskies	26	9	0.743
St. Francis Xavier X-Men	16	14	0.533
Acadia Axemen	15	15	0.500
Mount Allison Mounties	6	9	0.400
UNB Red Bombers	2	0	1.000
Bishop's Gaiters	1	3	0.250
UPEI Panthers	0	1	0.000
