= Mount Allison Mounties =

Mount Allison University athletic teams

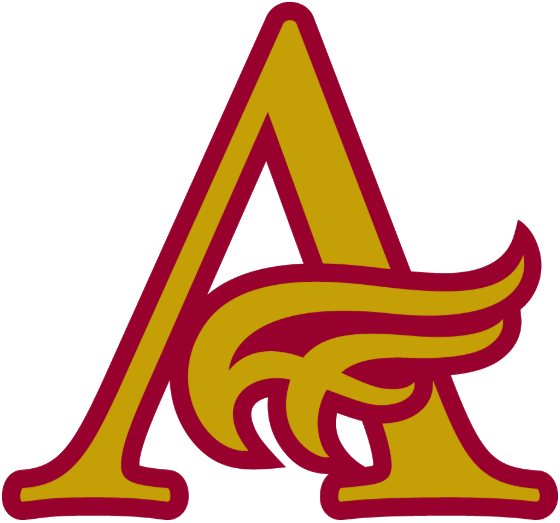
- University: Mount Allison University
- Association: U Sports; CCAA
- Conference: AUS; ACAA
- Location: Sackville, New Brunswick
- Football stadium: Alumni Field
- Arena: Tantramar Veterans Memorial Civic Centre
- Colours: Garnet and Gold
- Mascot: Duck
- Website: mountiepride.ca

The Mount Allison Mounties are the varsity athletic teams that represent Mount Allison University in Sackville, New Brunswick, Canada.

The Mounties sports teams play their matches at Alumni Field which seats 2,500.

== Athletics and recreations ==
The Mount Allison University Athletics & Recreation is led by Lindsay MacIntosh. MacIntosh is a former Atlantic University Sport basketball player and has held leadership roles in sport administration, including with Hockey Canada and as General Manager of the Cape Breton Eagles. She holds degrees in sport management and business administration focused on community development.

== Varsity teams ==
Men's sports	Women's sports
Badminton (ACAA)	Badminton (ACAA)
Basketball (ACAA)	Basketball (ACAA)
Football (AUS)	Ice hockey (AUS)
Soccer (AUS)	Soccer (AUS)
Swimming (AUS)	Swimming (AUS)
	Volleyball (ACAA)

=== Football ===
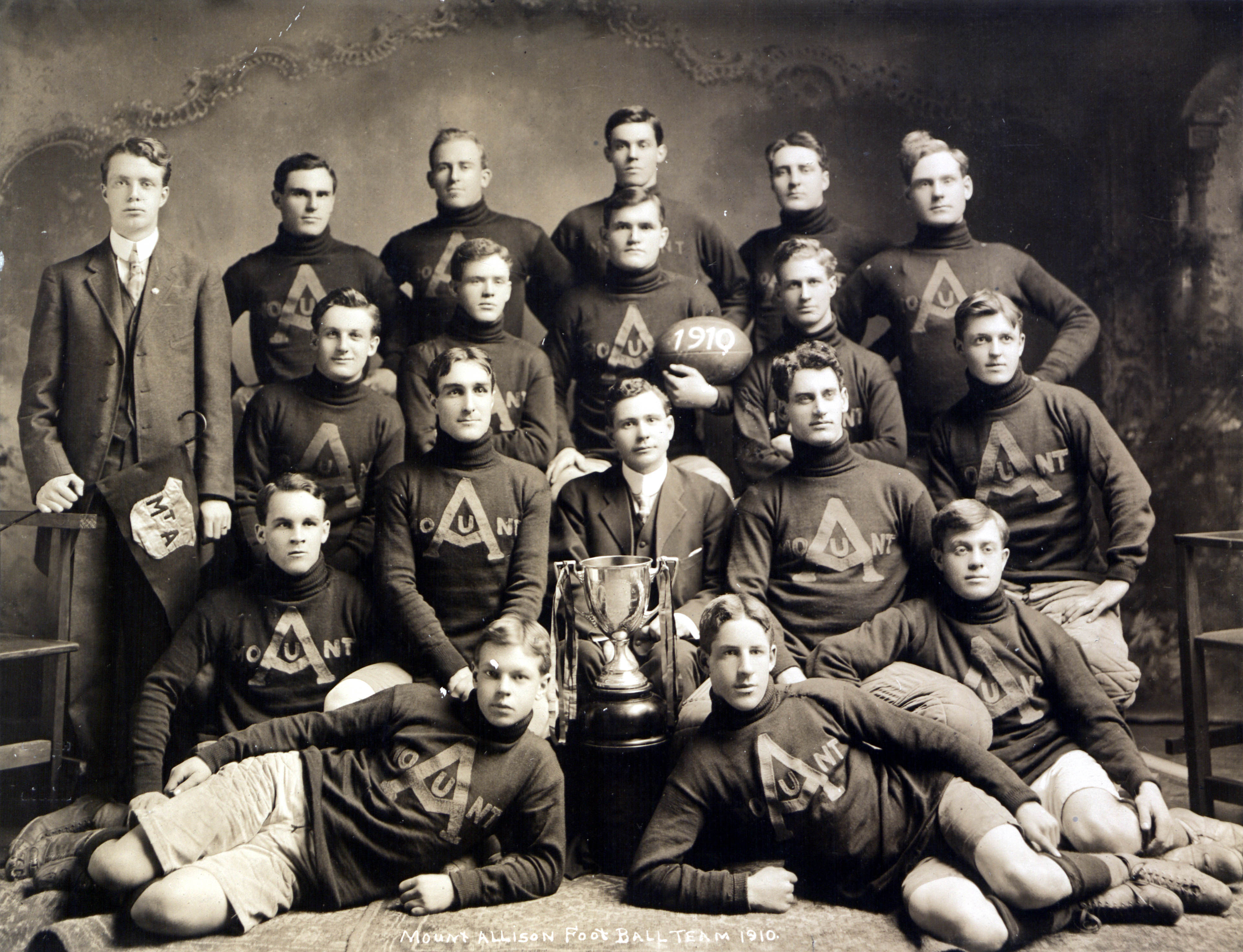
Early Mount Allison Rugby football team of 1910, prior to the establishment of American Football in Canada.

The Mounties football program has been in operation since 1955. The team has made two appearances in the Vanier Cup, first in 1984, and then in 1991. The team has won six Jewett Trophy conference championships in their 14 appearances, most recently during the team's undefeated 2014 season.

The program has also featured a Hec Crighton Trophy winner, Éric Lapointe, who won the award twice and was elected into the Canadian Football Hall of Fame based on his university career with the Mounties.

== Former teams ==
=== Men's ice hockey ===
The men's ice hockey team was active from 1896 through 1998 before being dropped as a varsity sport. World War II forced the team to stop playing for a time but they returned as soon as the fighting was over.

The program experienced a revival in the early 80s, winning two division titles, but that success was short-lived. In 1998, citing a need to reallocate funds to other programs as well as gender equality necessities, Athletic Director Jack Drover terminated the ice hockey program.

== Club teams ==
The Mount Allison Mounties also field club teams in:

- Curling (w)
- Cross country (mixed)
- Dance (mixed)
- Field Hockey (w)
- Field Lacrosse (m)
- Ringette (w)
- Rugby (m/w)
- Ultimate frisbee (mixed)

Although a club program, the Mounties cross country teams compete in the Atlantic Collegiate Athletic Association and have captured 20 championship banners (10 women’s and 10 men’s), with their most recent title being the women’s team in 2025-2026.

== Logo ==
In 1977, Garney Henley, a former Canadian Football League player with the Hamilton Tiger-Cats, became Athletics Director at Mount Allison and changed the logo from the "Double-Winged" A to the famous "Flying A" which remained the Mounties' logo until 2011. The Flying A became synonymous with Mounties athletics, and was arguably the most recognizable aspect of the department and the university.

In 2011, the university's administration undertook a re-branding initiative that would be campus-wide, stretching into the athletics department as well. Adopting a new, more modern look became the goal, and thus the current logo with an "A" adorned with a flame/torch was born. Taken from the university's crest, the flame, which also forms a stylized "A", along with the slanted font spelling "MOUNTIES" below the logo became the new look for the Mounties. Along with a new partnership with popular brand UnderArmour, it introduced the Mounties to the 21st century, and spearheaded by Athletics Director Pierre Arsenault became the one identity among all of the Mounties' varsity sports teams.

During the 2012 AUS Women's Hockey Playoffs, a new movement emerged on the Social Media website Twitter, when it is believed the phrase #MountiePride was first used in a popular fashion. Since then, the movement has leaped to new heights, and is now considered to be a part of this new identity, and a trademark of the Mounties teams.

== Athletes of the Year ==
This is an incomplete list

Year	Female Athlete	Sport	Male Athlete	Sport	Ref.
2014–15	Gillian Tetlow	Badminton	Brandon Leyh	Football	
2015–16	Allison Loewen	Swimming	Te Nguyen	Football	
2016–17	Kiersten Mangold	Basketball	Jakob Loucks	Football	
2017–18	Kiersten Mangold	Basketball	Geraint Berger	Swimming	
2018–19	Rachel McDougall	Volleyball	Nate Rostek	Football	
2019–20	Rachel McDougall	Volleyball	Noah Mascoll-Gomes	Swimming	

== See also ==
- U Sports
