= 38th Vanier Cup =

2002 Canadian university football tournament

Saint Mary's Huskies	Saskatchewan Huskies
(6–2)	(4–4)
33	21
Head coach: Blake Nill	Head coach: Brian Towriss
	1	2	3	4	Total
Saint Mary's Huskies	14	9	0	10	33
Saskatchewan Huskies	7	14	0	0	21
- Date: November 23, 2002
- Stadium: SkyDome
- Location: Toronto
- Ted Morris Memorial Trophy: Steve Panella, Saint Mary's
- Bruce Coulter Award: Joe Bonaventura, Saint Mary's
- Attendance: 17,179

Broadcasters
- Network: The Score/The Score HD

The 38th Vanier Cup was played on November 23, 2002, at SkyDome in Toronto, Ontario, and decided the CIAU football champion for the 2002 season. The Saint Mary's Huskies won their second consecutive championship by defeating the Saskatchewan Huskies by a score of 33–21.

== Game summary ==
Saint Mary's Huskies (33) – TDs, Dean Jones, Bill Robinson, Dave Stala, Gabe Harvey; FGs Dave Stala; cons., Dave Stala (4); safety touch (1).

Saskatchewan Huskies (21) – TDs, Chad Rempel, Brett Lamden, David Stevens; cons., Brett Czarnota (3).

=== Scoring summary ===
First Quarter
SMU – TD Jones 43 pass from Panella (Stala convert) (6:09)
SMU – TD Robinson 2 run (Stala convert) (9:31)
SSK – TD Rempel 12 pass from Ball (Czarnota convert) (14:10)

Second Quarter
SMU – Team Safety (4:09)
SSK – TD Lamden fumble recovery in endzone (Czarnota convert) (4:48)
SSK – TD Stevens 3 run (Czarnota convert) (13:59)
SMU – TD Stala 31 pass from Panella (Stala Convert) (14:56)

Third Quarter
No Scoring

Fourth Quarter
SMU – FG Stala 27 (5:16)
SMU – TD Harvey 2 run (Stala convert) (12:16)
