= 37th Vanier Cup =

2001 Canadian university football championship

Saint Mary's Huskies	Manitoba Bisons
(8–0)	(7–1)
42	16
Head coach: Blake Nill	Head coach: Brian Dobie
	1	2	3	4	Total
Saint Mary's Huskies	12	6	7	17	42
Manitoba Bisons	3	10	3	0	16
- Date: December 1, 2001
- Stadium: SkyDome
- Location: Toronto
- Ted Morris Memorial Trophy: Ryan Jones, Saint Mary's
- Bruce Coulter Award: Kyl Morrison, Saint Mary's
- Attendance: 19,138

Broadcasters
- Network: TSN (English) / RDS (French)

The 37th Vanier Cup was played on December 1, 2001, at the SkyDome in Toronto, Ontario, and decided the CIAU football champion for the 2001 season. The Saint Mary's Huskies won their second championship in school history by defeating the Manitoba Bisons by a score of 42–16.

== Game summary ==
Saint Mary's Huskies (42) - TDs, Thibeault, Currie, Perez, Morrison, Tyler; FGs Bartolucci (2); cons., Bartolucci (4); safety touch (1).

Manitoba Bisons (16) - TDs, Miller; FGs Boreham (3); cons., Boreham.

=== Scoring summary ===
First Quarter
SMU - FG Bartolucci 32 (4:12)
SMU - TD Thibeault 19 pass from Jones (Bartolucci convert) (7:20)
MAN - FG Boreham 21 (11:52)
SMU - Team Safety (15:00)

Second Quarter
MAN - TD Miller 5 pass from Munson (Boreham convert) (4:43)
MAN - FG Boreham 32 (12:20)
SMU - TD Curry 12 pass from Jones (Two-point convert failed) (13:41)

Third Quarter
SMU - TD Perez 10 run (Bartolucci convert) (9:40)
MAN - FG Boreham 23 (13:22)

Fourth Quarter
SMU - FG Bartolucci 31 (5:15)
SMU - TD Morrison 28 Interception (Bartolucci convert) (5:39)
SMU - TD Tyler 5 pass from Jones (Bartolucci convert) (9:01)
