= Laurier Golden Hawks =

Wilfrid Laurier University athletic teams

- University: Wilfrid Laurier University
- Nickname: Golden Hawks
- Association: U Sports
- Conference: Ontario University Athletics
- Athletic director: Peter Baxter (administrator)
- Location: Waterloo, Ontario
- Varsity teams: 21 (11 men's, 10 women's)
- Football stadium: Knight-Newbrough Field
- Basketball arena: Athletic Complex Gym
- Ice hockey arena: Waterloo Memorial Recreation Complex
- Baseball stadium: Bechtel Park
- Softball stadium: Waterloo Park 3
- Soccer stadium: Ansley Alumni Field
- Aquatics center: Athletic Complex Gym
- Lacrosse stadium: Ansley Alumni Field
- Rugby venue: Knight-Newbrough Field
- Colours: Purple and gold
- Mascot: Golden Hawk
- Fight song: "Laurier We'll Praise Thee Ever"
- Website: laurierathletics.com

The Laurier Golden Hawks is the name used by the varsity sports teams of Wilfrid Laurier University in Waterloo, Ontario, Canada. The university's varsity teams compete in the Ontario University Athletics conference of U Sports and, where applicable, in the west division.

== Varsity teams ==
While technically not considered a varsity team, Laurier has a university ringette team which competes annually in the Canadian national University Challenge Cup.

Laurier Golden Hawks teams compete in:

Men's sports	Women's sports
Baseball	Basketball
Basketball	Cross Country
Cross Country	Curling
Curling	Golf
Football	Ice Hockey
Golf	Lacrosse
Ice Hockey	Rugby
Rugby	Soccer
Soccer	Swimming
Swimming	Track and field
Track and field	

The Former WLU Golden Hawks logo from the 1960s

=== Football ===
The Golden Hawks football program has been one of the best in the conference, winning Vanier Cup national championships in 1991 and 2005. The team has also won 12 provincial championships, including eight Yates Cup championships. The program was led by head coach Michael Faulds from 2013 until 2025. The current head coach is Todd Galloway.

=== Women's ice hockey ===
The Golden Hawks women's varsity hockey team has become very successful, winning their first OUA championship in their 1998–99 season as well as winning in seven consecutive years (2004–2010). Overall, the program has featured 11 conference champions, with the most recent coming in 2014. The team won their first and only national championship in 2005. The team has been led by head coach Kelly Paton since the 2018–19 season.

=== Volleyball ===
Future Olympian Sam Schachter competed in volleyball for the Golden Hawks, with whom he was Ontario University Athletics Rookie of the Year.

=== Cheerleading ===
The WLU Competitive Cheerleading team has also risen to prominence in the last few years having won 6 national championship titles at the University National Cheerleading Championships conducted by Power Cheerleading Athletics. The Golden Hawk Cheerleaders have been ranked in the top five squads in the nation at least 8 times in the past 10 years, winning 6 national titles in 2007, 2008 (in the All-Female division), 2009 (in the Small-Coed division), 2010 (All-Female Division), and 2011 (All-Female Division). Most recently, the team brought home first place at the 2013 (All-Female Division) University Nationals Competition managing to outscore teams from all other divisions, securing the title of Grand Champions. In addition to the program's primarily competitive focus, the team can also be found cheering sidelines at football games, and both men's and women's basketball games.

== Club sports ==
- Field hockey
- Lacrosse (men's)
- Sailing
- Softball
- Squash

== See also ==
- U Sports
