= Manitoba Bisons football =

Canadian college football team

Manitoba Bisons
- Manitoba Bisons logo
- First season: 1920
- Athletic director: Coleen Dufresne
- Head coach: Stan Pierre; 2nd year, 8–8 (.500)
- Other staff: Vaughan Mitchell (OC)
- Home stadium: Princess Auto Stadium
- Year built: 2013
- Stadium capacity: 33,234
- Stadium surface: Turf
- Location: Winnipeg, Manitoba
- League: U Sports
- Conference: CWUAA (1964 - present)
- All-time record: 204–241–4 (.459)
- Postseason record: –

Titles
- Vanier Cups: 3, (1969, 1970, 2007)
- Mitchell Bowls: 1, (2007)
- Churchill Bowls: 3, (1969, 1970, 2001)
- Hardy Cups: 11, (1923, 1924, 1927, 1966, 1968, 1969, 1970, 1973, 2001, 2007, 2014)
- Hec Crighton winners: 0

Current uniform
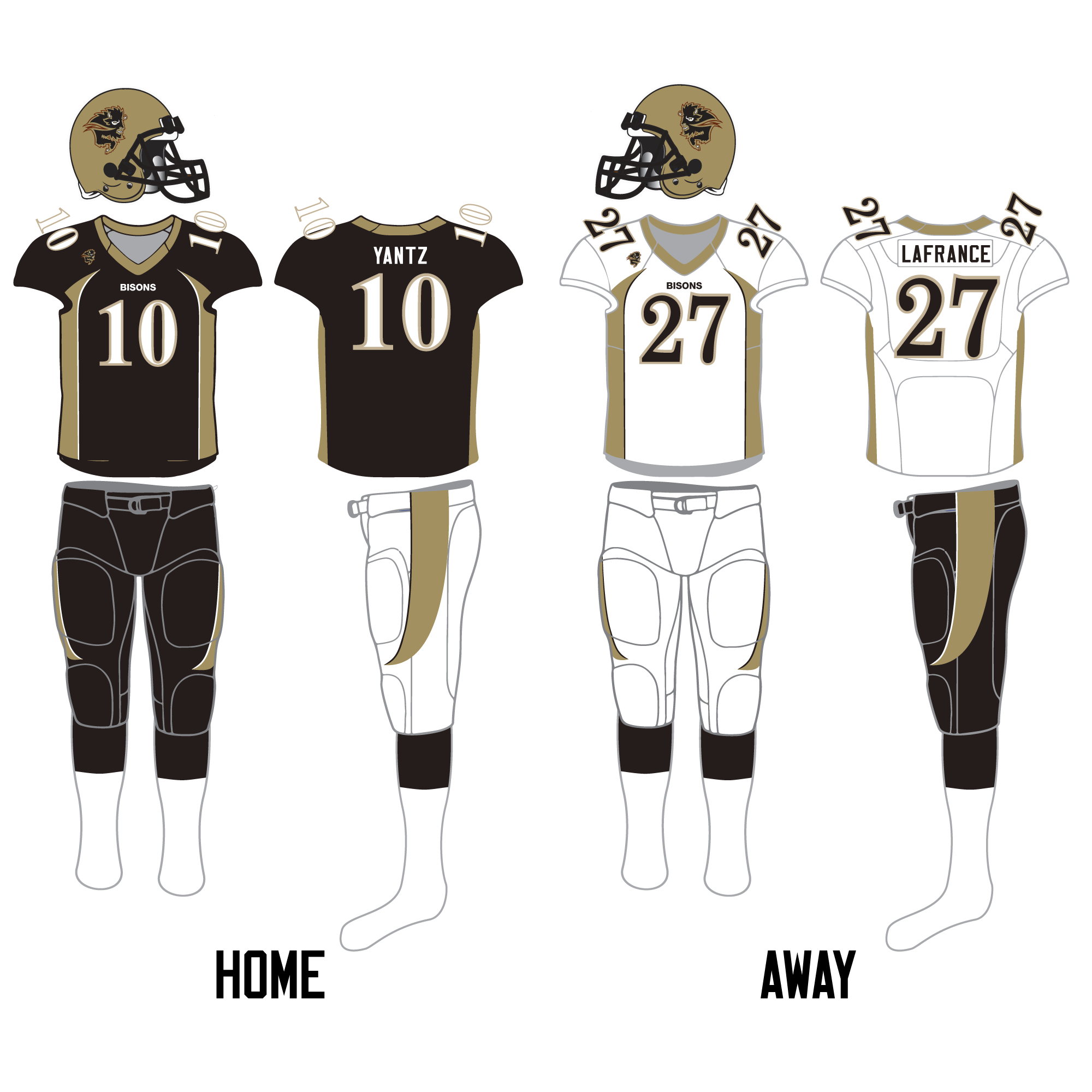
- Colours: Brown and Gold
- Outfitter: Nike
- Rivals: Saskatchewan Huskies
- Website: gobisons.ca

The Manitoba Bisons football team represents the University of Manitoba in the sport of Canadian football in U Sports. The program was the first of four U Sports football teams to have won back-to-back Vanier Cup championships, having won in 1969 and 1970. In total, the Bisons have won three Vanier Cup national championships and 11 Hardy Trophy conference championships.

== Notable history ==
In 2007, the Bisons' football team won the Vanier Cup as the national champions in Canadian Interuniversity football, the first for the school in 37 years. Pat Gill, the manager then, was the manager for 40 years and was with the team during the 1969 and 1970 Vanier Cup teams. A big factor in the 2007 Vanier Cup was the injury to running back Matt Henry, who suffered a broken femur in three places and severe muscle damage. However, in the end, kicker and punter Scott Dixon converted on all but one of his field goals and pinned the Saint Mary's Huskies deep several times. Dixon, in his rookie year, was tied for second all-time for most field goals in a game.

Maya Turner became the first woman to play in any U Sports regular season football game, on September 23, 2023, as a Manitoba Bisons kicker. She kicked the game winning field goal in overtime for the Bisons in their game against the Regina Rams.

The Bisons were led by head coach, Brian Dobie, who served as the team's head coach from 1996 to 2024. Stan Pierre, who served as the team's defensive coordinator since 1999, was named head coach on January 16, 2025.

== Recent season results ==
Season	Games	Won	Lost	T/OTL	PCT	PF	PA	Standing	Playoffs
2000	8	6	1	1	0.813	279	138	1st in CW	Defeated UBC Thunderbirds in semi-final 14–4; Lost to Regina Rams in Hardy Cup 25–22
2001	8	7	1	0	0.875	302	91	1st in CW	Defeated Calgary Dinos in semi-final 31–10; Defeated Regina Rams in Hardy Cup 23–17; Defeated McMaster Marauders in Churchill Bowl 27–6; Lost to Saint Mary's Huskies in 37th Vanier Cup 42–16
2002	8	8	0	0	1.000	271	119	1st in CW	Lost to Saskatchewan Huskies in semi-final 37–18
2003	8	3	5	0	0.375	172	249	6th in CW	Out of playoffs
2004	8	3	5	0	0.375	191	237	5th in CW	Out of playoffs
2005	8	4	3	1	0.563	228	172	3rd in CW	Lost to Alberta Golden Bears in semi-final 33–24
2006	8	8	0	0	1.000	363	143	1st in CW	Defeated Regina Rams in semi-final 44–29; Lost to Saskatchewan Huskies in Hardy Cup 32–15
2007	8	8	0	-	1.000	206	110	1st in CW	Defeated Calgary Dinos in semi-final 27–5; Defeated Regina Rams in Hardy Cup 48–5; Defeated Western Ontario Mustangs in Mitchell Bowl 52–20; Defeated Saint Mary's Huskies in 43rd Vanier Cup 28–14
2008	8	3	5	-	0.375	126	160	5th in CW	Out of playoffs
2009^{[A]}	7	2	5	-	0.286	164	203	6th in CW	Out of playoffs
2010	8	2	6	-	0.250	160	295	5th in CW	Out of playoffs
2011	8	3	5	-	0.375	214	218	5th in CW	Out of playoffs
2012	8	4	4	-	0.500	282	306	4th in CW	Lost to Calgary Dinos in semi-final 57–18
2013	8	5	3	-	0.625	335	274	2nd in CW	Defeated Saskatchewan Huskies in semi-final 37–36; Lost to Calgary Dinos in Hardy Cup 43–28
2014	8	4	4	-	0.500	290	247	3rd in CW	Defeated Saskatchewan Huskies in semi-final 47–39; Defeated Calgary Dinos in Hardy Cup 27–15; Lost to Montreal Carabins in Uteck Bowl 29–26
2015	8	5	3	-	0.625	284	253	3rd in CW	Lost to UBC Thunderbirds in semi-final 52–10
2016	8	3	5	-	0.375	276	323	5th in CW	Out of playoffs
2017	8	2	6	-	0.250	180	289	6th in CW	Out of playoffs
2018	8	3	5	-	0.375	195	225	4th in CW	Lost to Calgary Dinos in semi-final 37–13
2019	8	4	4	-	0.500	221	242	4th in CW	Lost to Calgary Dinos in semi-final 47–46
2020	Season cancelled due to COVID-19 pandemic								
2021	6	4	2	–	0.667	138	124	2nd in CW	Defeated Alberta Golden Bears in semi-final 43–17; Lost to Saskatchewan Huskies in Hardy Cup 45–17
2022	8	4	4	–	0.500	232	217	4th in CW	Lost to Saskatchewan Huskies in semi-final 37–9
2023	8	3	5	–	0.375	203	272	4th in CW	Lost to UBC Thunderbirds in semi-final 29–21
2024	8	7	1	–	0.875	251	204	1st in CW	Lost to Regina Rams in semi-final 28–25
2025	8	4	4	–	0.500	166	186	3rd in CW	Lost to Regina Rams in semi-final 32–29
2026	8	4	4	–	0.500	178	191	4th in CW	Lost to UBC Thunderbirds in semi-final 30–23

A. Manitoba forfeited two wins for using an ineligible player. Simon Fraser also used an ineligible player in a Manitoba loss, so the game was declared "no contest".

== National postseason results ==
Vanier Cup Era (1965-current)
Year	Game	Opponent	Result
1968	Churchill Bowl	Queen's	L 6-29
1969	Churchill Bowl Vanier Cup	Windsor McGill	W 41-7 W 24-15
1970	Churchill Bowl Vanier Cup	Queen's Ottawa	W 24-20 W 38-11
1973	Churchill Bowl	McGill	L 0-16
2001	Churchill Bowl Vanier Cup	McMaster Saint Mary's	W 27-6 L 16-42
2007	Mitchell Bowl Vanier Cup	Western Saint Mary's	W 52-20 W 28-14
2014	Uteck Bowl	Montreal	L 26-29

Manitoba is 4-3 in national semi-final games and 3-1 in the Vanier Cup.

== Head coaches ==
Name	Years	Notes
Paul Bennett	1919–1920	
Fred Ritter	1921–1922	
Hunt	1923	
Hal Moulden	1924	
Fred Ritter	1925–1928	
Bob Priestley	1929	
Jack Little	1930	
Karl Wintemute	1931	
No team	1932	
Gordon Bowes	1933	
Walter Hass	1934	
No team	1935–1940	
Bill Boivin	1941	
Art Stevenson	1942	
No team	1939–1945	
Pat Twomey	1946–1947	
Acey Olson	1948–1950	
No team	1951–1961	
George Depres	1962–1966	
Henry Janzen	1967–1971	
Gary Naylor	1972–1978	
Dennis Hrycaiko	1979–1989	
Scott Spurgeon	1990–1992	
Ron Lancaster Jr.	1993–1995	
Brian Dobie	1996–2024	
Stan Pierre	2025–present	

== National award winners ==
- J. P. Metras Trophy: Bart Evans (1974), Jason Rauhaus (1991), Israel Idonije (2002), David Onyemata (2015), Giordano Vaccaro (2024)
- Presidents' Trophy: Joey Mikawoz (2000), D. J. Lalama (2016)
- Peter Gorman Trophy: Domenic Zagari (1991)
- Russ Jackson Award: Thomas Hall (2009, 2010), Cameron Teschuk (2016), Mark Rauhaus (2023)
- Frank Tindall Trophy: Henry Janzen (1969), Brian Dobie (2001)
- Gino Fracas Award: Richard Urbanovich (2005), Vaughan Mitchell (2023)

== Manitoba Bisons in professional football ==
As of the start of the 2026 CFL season, six former Bisons players are on CFL teams' rosters:

- Gavin Cobb, Winnipeg Blue Bombers
- Nic Demski, Winnipeg Blue Bombers
- Collin Kornelson, Winnipeg Blue Bombers
- Jake Nitychoruk, Hamilton Tiger-Cats
- Matthew Stokman, Calgary Stampeders
- Zack Williams, Calgary Stampeders

In the 2016 NFL draft, David Onyemata became the first Bison to be drafted into the National Football League, being selected in the 4th round, 120th overall by the New Orleans Saints. As of the start of the 2025 NFL season, he is on the active roster of the Atlanta Falcons.
