= 2014 Ottawa Gee-Gees football team =

College football season

2014 Ottawa Gee-Gees football
- Conference: Ontario University Athletics
- Record: 5–3 (5–3 OUA)
- Head coach: Jamie Barresi (2nd season)
- Defensive coordinator: Devin Murphy (2nd season)
- Home stadium: Gee-Gees Field

Uniform

2014 OUA standings
(Rank) Team	W		L	PTS	Playoff Spot
#3 McMaster	7	-	1	14	†
#5 Guelph	7	-	1	14	X
#7 Western	6	-	2	12	X
Windsor	5	-	3	10	X
#10 Ottawa	5	-	3	10	X
Laurier	4	-	4	8	X
Carleton	4	-	4	8	
Queen's	3	-	5	6	
Toronto	2	-	6	4	
Waterloo	1	-	7	2	
York	0	-	8	0	
† – Conference Champion; Rankings: CIS Top 10

The 2014 Ottawa Gee-Gees football team represented the University of Ottawa in the 2014 CIS football season. They were led by second-year head coach Jamie Barresi and played their home games at Gee-Gees Field. They were a member of the Ontario University Athletics conference. They began their season on September 1, where they defeated the York Lions 51-7 at home. Their regular season ended on October 25 with a 38-18 home win against the #3 McMaster Marauders. They gained the 5th seed in the OUA playoffs and where they traveled to Windsor to play the Lancers on November 1 coming away with a 46-29 win. They advanced to take on McMaster in the OUA semifinals, where after holding a lead over the team that would eventually go on to lose in the Vanier Cup, their season came to an end with a 42-31 loss.

== Personnel ==
=== Coaching staff ===
Name	Position	Seasons at Ottawa	Alma mater
Jamie Barresi	Head Coach/Offensive Coordinator	1	Ottawa (1980)
Devin Murphy	Defensive coordinator	1	Ottawa (2005)
Steven Watts	Special teams coordinator/Defensive Backs	1	Ottawa (2007)
Bill MacDermott	Offensive line	1	Trinity (1960)
Ben D'Andrea	Defensive & Specials Assistant/Linebackers	1	Queen's (2011)
David Miller-Johnston	Kickers	9	Concordia (1998)
Mike Ireland	Defensive line	1	Ottawa (2006)
Ron Raymond	Wide receivers/quarterbacks	2	N/A
Aaron Geisler	Running backs	1	Western

== Schedule ==
Date	Time	Opponent	Rank	Site	Result	Attendance
September 1	1:00 pm	at York		Gee-Gees Field; Ottawa, ON	W 51–7	4152
September 5	1:00 pm	at No. 9 Queen's	No. 16	Richardson Stadium; Kingston, ON	W 37–30	2250
September 13	1:00 pm	No. 7 Guelph	No. 8	Gee-Gees Field; Ottawa, ON	L 7-42	700
September 20	1:00 pm	vs. Carleton	No. 10	TD Place Stadium; Ottawa, ON (Panda Game)	L 31-33	12000
September 27	1:00 pm	at Toronto		Varsity Stadium; Toronto, ON	W 41-25	1349
October 4	1:00 pm	Waterloo		Gee-Gees Field; Ottawa, ON	W 51-10	700
October 10	7:00 pm	at No. 13 Windsor		Alumni Field; Windsor, ON	L 39-29	2618
October 25	1:00 pm	No. 3 McMaster		Gee-Gees Field; Ottawa, ON	W 38-18	1000
November 1	1:00 pm	at Windsor	No. 10	Alumni Field; Windsor, ON (OUA Quarterfinal)	W 46-29	3410
November 7	1:00 pm	at No. 3 McMaster	No. 10	Ron Joyce Stadium; Hamilton, ON (OUA Semifinals)	L 42-32	6000
Rankings from CIS Top 10 released prior to game; All times are in Eastern time

Schedule source:

== Game summaries ==
=== York ===
York @ Ottawa

Team	1	2	3	4	Total
Lions	3	4	0	0	7
• Gee-Gees	10	24	0	17	51

- Date: September 1
- Location: Gee-Gees Field, Ottawa
- Game start: 1:00 PM EDT
- Game attendance: 4,152
- Game weather: 28°C, Sunny
- Referee: Kevin Horton

The Gee-Gees opened their 2014 campaign with a resounding 51-7 win over the York Lions. Junior quarterback Derek Wendel completed 24 of 26 passes for 341 yards and four touchdown passes. Junior running back Mack Tommy led a Gee-Gees rushing attack that racked up 267 yards, 105 of those yards and a TD coming from Tommy.

The game would become the Gee-Gees largest margin of victory in the 2014 regular season.

=== @ Queen's ===
Ottawa @ Queen's

Team	1	2	3	4	Total
• Gee-Gees	14	2	0	21	37
Gaels	0	17	10	3	30

- Date: September 5
- Location: Richardson Stadium, Kingston, ON
- Game start: 1:00 PM EDT
- Game attendance: 2,250
- Game weather: 21°C, Rainy
- Referee: M. Drinkwalter

The #16 Gee-Gees would go on the road to take on the 2013 Yates Cup finalist #9 Queen's Gaels. The first quarter was all Gee-Gees as they took the ball 91 yards down the field on 5 plays to open the scoring on a 31-yard Vincent Campbell TD catch. They'd add another seven minutes later on an 11-yard Mack Tommy run. Queen's would come alive in the second quarter. On the quarter's opening play, Gaels' quarterback Billy McPhee threw a TD get Queen's on the board. With 5:39 to go in the half, Queen's took their first lead, 17-14, with a touchdown pass to Jonah Pataki.

In the fourth quarter the Gee-Gees would put up 21 points to steal a comeback win and hand Queen's their first loss at Richardson Stadium in three years. QB Derek Wendel finished 35 for 52 passing, tallying 401 yards through the air, and three TD passes while also leading the team in rushing with 104 yards on the ground.

Following the win, the Gee-Gees would move to become the #8 team in the nation.

=== Guelph ===
Guelph @ Ottawa

Team	1	2	3	4	Total
• Gryphons	7	16	9	10	42
Gee-Gees	0	0	0	7	7

- Date: September 13
- Location: Gee-Gees Field, Ottawa
- Game start: 1:00 PM EDT
- Game attendance: 700
- Game weather: 9°C, Rain
- Referee: H. Chiu

=== @ Carleton ===
Ottawa vs. Carleton

Team	1	2	3	4	Total
Gee-Gees	7	11	3	10	31
• Ravens	7	7	7	12	33

- Date: September 20
- Location: TD Place Stadium, Ottawa
- Game start: 1:00 PM EDT
- Game attendance: 12,000
- Game weather: 20°C, Overcast
- Referee: Kevin Horton

=== @ Toronto ===
Ottawa @ Toronto

Team	1	2	3	4	Total
• Gee-Gees	17	14	7	3	41
Varsity Blues	0	13	7	5	25

- Date: September 27
- Location: Varsity Stadium, Toronto
- Game start: 1:00 PM EDT
- Game attendance: 1,350
- Game weather: 24°C, Clear
- Referee: H. Chiu

=== Waterloo ===
Waterloo @ Ottawa

Team	1	2	3	4	Total
Warriors	0	3	3	4	10
• Gee-Gees	17	28	3	3	51

- Date: October 4th
- Location: Gee-Gees Field, Ottawa
- Game start: 1:00 PM EDT
- Game attendance: 700
- Game weather: 17°C, Rain
- Referee: Kevin Horton

=== @ Windsor ===
Ottawa @ Windsor

Team	1	2	3	4	Total
Gee-Gees	1	14	0	14	29
• Lancers	14	10	12	3	39

- Date: October 10
- Location: Alumni Stadium, Windsor, ON
- Game start: 7:00 PM EDT
- Game attendance: 2,618
- Game weather: 12°C, Overcast

=== McMaster ===
McMaster @ Ottawa

Team	1	2	3	4	Total
Marauders	9	3	0	6	18
• Gee-Gees	3	8	17	10	38

- Date: October 25th
- Location: Gee-Gees Field, Ottawa
- Game start: 1:00 PM EDT
- Game attendance: 1,000
- Game weather: 14°C, Rain
- Referee: M. Drinkwater

=== OUA Playoff Quarterfinal @ Windsor ===
Ottawa @ Windsor

Team	1	2	3	4	Total
• Gee-Gees	14	16	7	9	46
Lancers	9	7	7	6	29

- Date: November 1st
- Location: Alumni Stadium, Windsor, ON
- Game start: 1:00 PM EDT
- Game attendance: 3,410
- Game weather: 5°C, Cloudy

=== OUA Playoff Semifinal @ McMaster ===
Ottawa @ McMaster

Team	1	2	3	4	Total
Gee-Gees	0	13	15	3	31
• Marauders	0	18	8	16	42

- Date: November 7th
- Location: Ron Joyce Stadium, Hamilton, ON
- Game start: 1:00 PM EDT
- Game attendance: 6,000
- Game weather: 7°C, Cloudy and rain
- Referee: F. Cooper

== Awards and honours ==
- J. P. Metras Trophy

Ettore Lattanzio

=== Honours ===
==== OUA All-Stars ====
- First Team

Ettore Lattanzio

- Second Team

Adam Valchuk
Nick Lecour

- All-Rookie Team

Jackson Bennett

==== All-Canadians ====
Ettore Lattanzio
