= 2017 Ottawa Gee-Gees football team =

College football season

2017 Ottawa Gee-Gees football
- Conference: Ontario University Athletics
- Record: 5–3 (5–3 OUA)
- Head coach: Jamie Barresi (5th season)
- Defensive coordinator: Jean-Vincent Posy-Audette (2nd season)
- Home stadium: Gee-Gees Field

Uniform
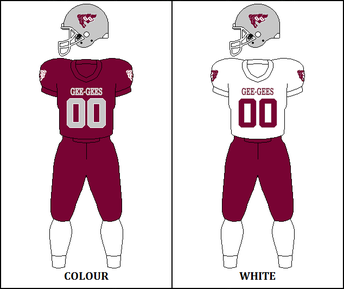

2017 OUA standings
Team	W		L	PF		PA	Pts	Ply
#2 Western	8	-	0	386	-	105	16	†
#5 Laurier	6	-	2	308	-	175	12	X
#10 McMaster	6	-	2	209	-	115	12	X
Ottawa	5	-	3	190	-	215	10	X
Guelph	5	-	3	293	-	196	10	X
Queen's	4	-	4	290	-	223	8	X
Waterloo	4	-	4	299	-	339	8	
Carleton	3	-	5	222	-	232	6	
Windsor	1	-	7	142	-	362	2	
York	1	-	7	163	-	340	2	
Toronto	1	-	7	108	-	308	2	
† – Conference Champion; Rankings: U Sports Top 10

The 2017 Ottawa Gee-Gees football team represented the University of Ottawa in the 2017 U Sports football season. They were led by fifth-year head coach Jamie Barresi and played their home games at Gee-Gees Field. They are a member of the Ontario University Athletics conference. They began their season on August 27, where they defeated the Guelph Gryphons in overtime on the road. Their season ended in the OUA Quarter-Final playoff game against the same Gryphons by a score of 30–8.

== Personnel ==
=== Coaching staff ===
Name	Position	Seasons at Ottawa	Alma mater
Jamie Barresi	Head coach/offensive coordinator	4	Ottawa (1980)
Jean-Vincent Posy-Audette	Defensive coordinator	1	Laval (1999)
Carl Tolmie	Offensive line	1	Carleton (1997)
Nathan Taylor	Special teams coordinator/ Recruiting Coordinator	1	Concordia (2012)
Scott Westlake	Running back	4	Bishop's
Aaron Geisler	Wide receiver	6	Western
David Miller-Johnston	Kicker	11	Concordia (1998)

== Schedule ==
Date	Time	Opponent	Rank	Site	TV	Result	Attendance
August 27	1:00 pm	at Guelph		Alumni Stadium; Guelph, ON		W 24–21 ^{2OT}	1350
September 4	2:00 pm	Queen's	No. 9	Gee-Gees Field; Ottawa, ON		W 14–13	976
September 9	1:00 pm	at York	No. 9	Alumni Field; Toronto, ON		W 26–17	788
September 16	1:00 pm	at No. 9 McMaster	No. 8	Ron Joyce Stadium; Hamilton, ON		L 24–7	1750
September 23	1:00 pm	Windsor		Gee-Gees Field; Ottawa, ON		W 39–14	890
September 30	1:00 pm	vs. Carleton		TD Place Stadium; Ottawa, ON (Panda Game)	CityTV	L 33–30 ^{2OT}	24,420
October 14	1:00 pm	Waterloo		Gee-Gees Field; Ottawa, ON		W 40–30	842
October 21	1:00 pm	at No. 4 Western		TD Waterhouse Stadium; London, ON		L 63–10	5223
Rankings from U Sports Top 10 released prior to game; All times are in Eastern time

Schedule source:
