= Ottawa Gee-Gees football =

Canadian football team

Ottawa Gee-Gees
- Ottawa Gee-Gees logo
- First season: 1881; 145 years ago
- Athletic director: Sue Hylland
- Head coach: Marcel Bellefeuille; 9th year, 46–24 (.657)
- Other staff: Jean-Vincent Posy-Audette (DC); Vincent Campbell (OC)
- Home stadium: Gee-Gees Field
- Year built: 2013
- Stadium capacity: 3,400
- Stadium surface: FieldTurf
- Location: Ottawa, Ontario
- League: U Sports
- Conference: OUA (2001 - present)
- Past associations: ORFU (1885-1889, 1892-3) QRFU (1894-1904); CIRFU (1905-1912); OIFC (1957-1966); CCIFC (1967-1970); OUAA (1971-1973); OQIFC (1974-2000)
- All-time record: –
- Postseason record: –

Titles
- Vanier Cups: 2; 1975, 2000
- Churchill Bowls: 2*; 1975, 1997*, 2000 (*Forced to forfeit post-season titles in 1997 because of ineligible players)
- Yates Cups: 4; 1907, 1975, 1976, 2006
- Dunsmore Cups: 4; 1980, 1995, 1996, 2000
- Hec Crighton winners: 4 Paul Paddon, Rick Zmich, Phil Côté, Brad Sinopoli

Current uniform
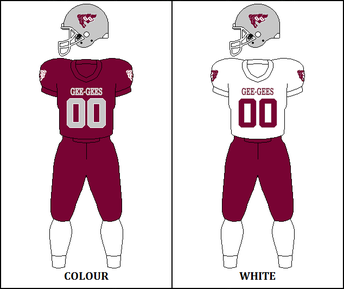
- Colours: Garnet and Grey
- Outfitter: Adidas
- Rivals: Carleton Ravens; Western Mustangs; Queen's Gaels
- Website: geegees.ca/football

The University of Ottawa Gee-Gees football team represents the University of Ottawa in the sport of Canadian football. The Gee-Gees compete in the Ontario University Athletics (OUA) conference of U Sports. Football at the University of Ottawa began in 1881, it was one of the first established football programs in Canada.

The Gee-Gees have appeared in five Vanier Cup championships, winning the national title in 1975 and 2000 and losing in 1970, 1980 and 1997. The team plays their games at TD Place Stadium. The Gee-Gees have also won a total of eight conference championships, including four Yates Cups and four Dunsmore Cups as the team split time between the OUA and OQIFC. conferences.

The Gee-Gees are also a part of a football rivalry with the Carleton Ravens. For over 50 years they have played the traditional Panda Game, which has gained worldwide attention.

== History ==
=== Beginnings and dominance (1881–1913) ===
Football had its inception at Ottawa in 1881. At the time, the game looked much more like its rugby union predecessor. The first organized college football game was only played a handful of years earlier in 1874 between McGill and Harvard.

In 1894, the Garnet and Grey joined the Quebec Rugby Football Union (QRFU) and dominated from their first year of play. The team won eight QRFU championships (1894, 1896–99, 1901–04).

During these years, the de facto national championship was awarded to the victor of the Canadian Rugby Union (CRU). Ottawa won the national title four times, in 1894, 1896, 1897, and 1901. The CRU's championship trophy was renamed in 1909, becoming the Grey Cup, and has since become the championship trophy for the Canadian Football League.

The Gee-Gees became Yates Cup champions for the first time in 1907. One star player from this era was Silver Quilty, who according to the Gee-Gees Football Hall of Fame, "played three roles for the Gee-Gees team, he was the first man to play the "flying wing" position, and he was the prime ball carrier as well as the team's kicker in 1908 and 1909." His contributions were significant in the team's first Yates Cup victory.

==== Father William Stanton (1911–13) ====
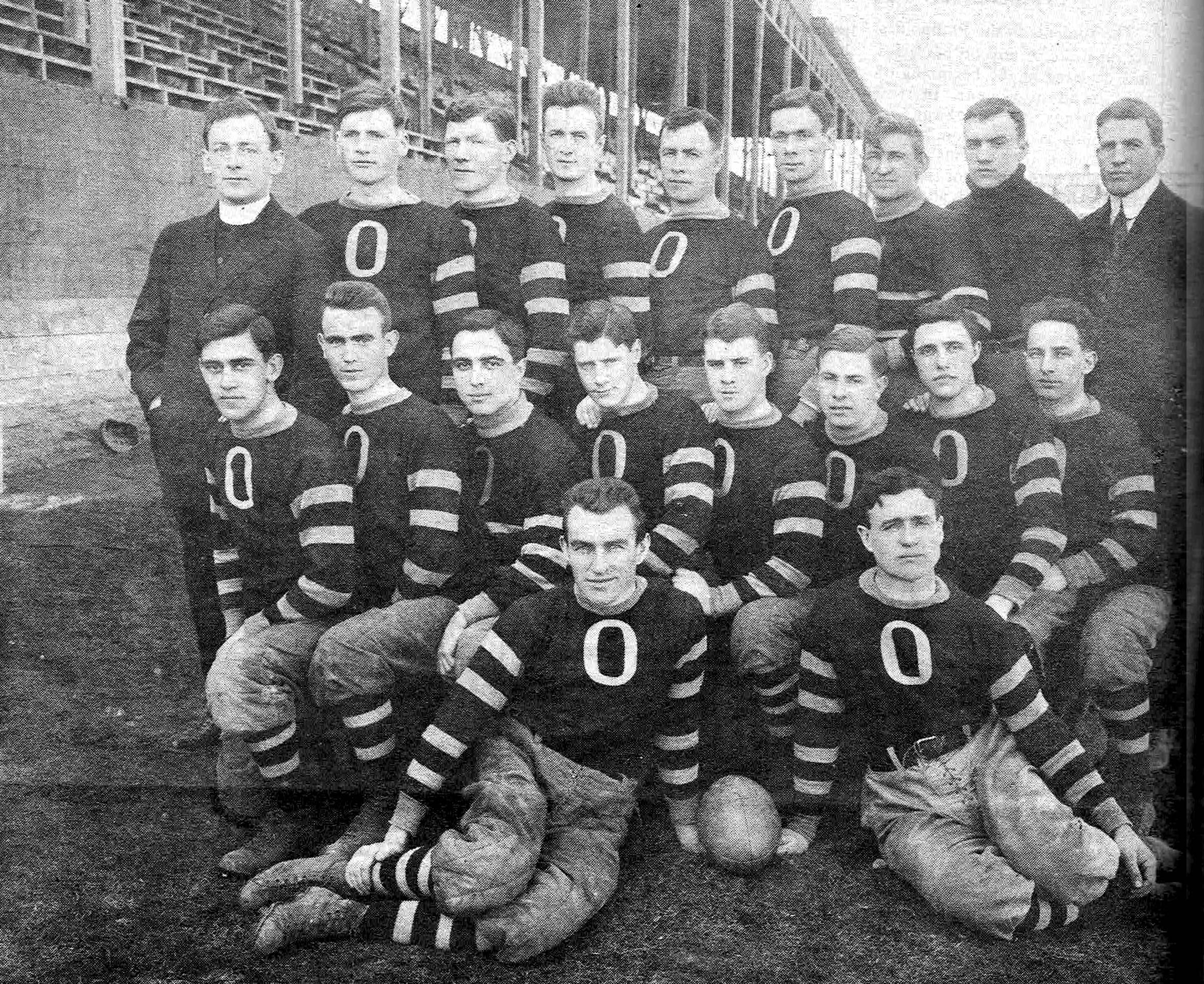
1912 Garnet and Grey varsity football team. Coached by Father William Stanton (top left)

Father Stanton was the head coach of the Gee-Gees for three seasons, posting an 8–5–2 record. Although Stanton had a short tenure with the football team, his innovations to the game of Canadian football were great. His additions to the game include the spiral punt, the football sweater, and deception plays.

=== Modern era begins (1913–54) ===
The game of football was now rapidly spreading, and popularity increased to go along with the use of the forward pass. Throughout the 1920s and 1930s, more and more separation began to establish the game of football as it is seen today.

Like most football teams across North America, significant breaks in action were caused during WWI and WWII, as many men were serving in Europe.

In 1953, as the team's popularity rose, Gee-Gees moved on from their on-campus home at the Varsity Oval to the larger and more centrally located Lansdowne Park, which they would now share with the Ottawa Rough Riders. This move would coincide with a renaissance of sorts for football in Ottawa.

=== Matt Anthony era (1954–68) ===
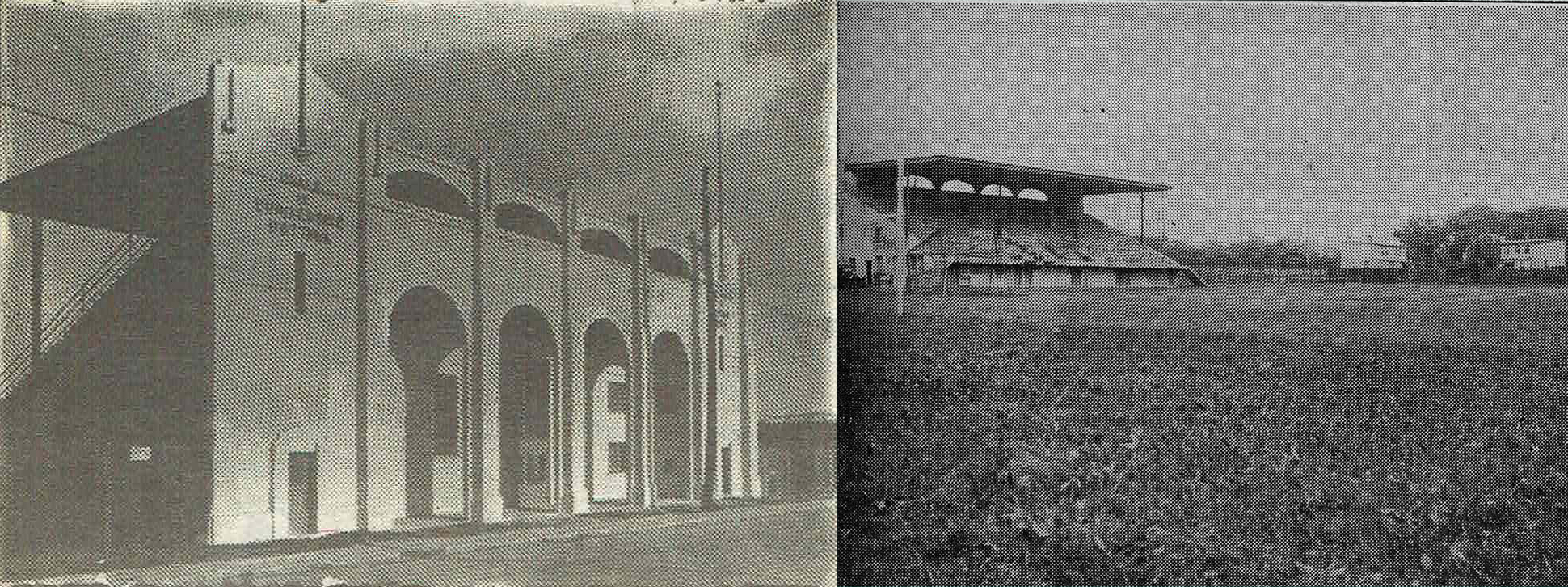
Varsity Oval, as pictured in 1953. The original home to the Garnet and Grey.

Matt Anthony, fresh from a career playing offensive line in the CFL for seven years became the new head coach of the Gee-Gees. Fresh in their new home at Lansdowne, the team began to form into a national powerhouse on a new level.

During Anthony's 15 years at the helm, the Gee-Gees won seven league and conference championships, including three undefeated seasons. Anthony is still the winningest coach in Gee-Gees history. The operatic tenor Jean Bonhomme played center position for the Gee-Gees for seven years during Anthony's tenure.

At the same time, the Panda Game had begun as Carleton College began fielding football teams and the rivalry became centre of attention in the city and the nation. Early Panda Games featured an atmosphere much akin to NCAA Division I football in the United States, most iterations of the game during this era fetched over 20,000 fans.

After Anthony's death in 2000, the University of Ottawa opened the Minto Sports Complex in 2001, with it came a multi-use turf field that was named after the Gee-Gees legend. Matt Anthony Field served as the practice field for the football team until 2013. It is currently home to Gee-Gees women's soccer and rugby varsity teams, as well as men's soccer and rugby competitive clubs.

=== Bob O'Billovich (1970) ===
Following the Gee-Gees success in prior years, new head coach Bob O'Billovich stepped up and led the team to one of their best seasons ever. After captaining the football, basketball, and baseball teams at the University of Montana, O'Billovitch had a career in the CFL before settling in as head coach of the 1970 Gee-Gees. The quality of team this year set the table for a run to the school's first Vanier Cup after posting a 7–1–1 regular season record.

In the playoffs, the team cruised to an Atlantic Bowl victory with a 24–11 win over the UNB Varsity Reds. The Garnet and Grey advanced to their first appearance in the Vanier Cup (then College Bowl) national final, but lost 38–11 to the Manitoba Bisons at Toronto’s Varsity Stadium.

Gee-Gees quarterback Paul Paddon was dominant all season long and was instrumental in the team's success. Paddon won the Hec Crighton Trophy for the most outstanding player in the nation, it was the school's first ever.

Following the season, O'Billovich stepped down and shifted focuses back to basketball where he coached the Carleton Ravens before returning to lead the Gee-Gees men's basketball team. O'Billovich went on to a long career coaching in the CFL and is currently the eighth winningest head coach in league history.

=== Don Gilbert led powerhouse (1971–75) ===
Fresh from a National Championship push, the Gee-Gees reloaded with the hire of Don Gilbert, a former star quarterback for his hometown Buffalo Bulls, he went on to play in the CFL before landing with the Gee-Gees. One of Gilbert's key advantages he brought to Ottawa was a strong recruiting prowess on both sides of the border. With an influx of American talent from his native New York, the Gee-Gees began assembling what is hailed by many as the best Canadian college football team of all time.

==== 1975 Vanier Cup champions ====
The undefeated 1975 National Championship team (11–0) is considered to be one of the most dominant in Canadian university history. That team became the first to finish with a perfect record after winning a Vanier Cup. Even to this day, the 1975 team still holds several CIS and OUA team and individual records. Players from the 1975 team were selected to the CIS All-Canadian team 13 times during their university careers. During their CIS careers, players from the 1975 team were selected as OUAA an OQIFC All-Stars 42 times.

==== '75 Gee-Gees career awards ====
- 13 All-Canadian Selections during their CIS careers
- 42 OUAA All-Star Selections during their CIS careers
- 1 Hec Crighton Finalist (CIS Outstanding Player)
- 2 J.P. Metras Trophy Finalists (CIS Outstanding Lineman)
- 1 Frank Tindall Trophy (CIS Coach of the Year)
- 1 Ted Morris Trophy (MVP Vanier Cup)

==== '75 Gee-Gees in the CFL ====
A total of 21 players from the 1975 Vanier Cup Championship team were selected in the Canadian Football League draft, including nine players in the first round or higher including six CFL Territorial Protections (from 1973 through 1982 each CFL team was allowed to pick and protect 2 players from their region before the 1st round began). During their careers as professionals, players from the 1975 Vanier Cup Championship team appeared in 23 Grey Cup games and went on to collect a total of 12 Grey Cup Rings. The following is a brief list of the impact that these players have had in the Canadian Football League.

- Eric Upton – Guard – 10 years CFL Edmonton Eskimos-3 time Western All-Star, 6 Grey Cup Appearances, 5 time Grey Cup Champion
- Rocky DiPietro – Slotback – 14 years CFL Hamilton Tiger-Cats, CFL All-Time Pass Reception Leader, Canadian Football Hall of Fame Inductee, 2 time CFL Outstanding Canadian, 3 time Lew Hayman Trophy Outstanding Canadian Eastern Division, 5 time Eastern All-Star, 4 Grey Cup Appearances, 1986 Grey Cup Champion
- Neil Lumsden – Fullback/kicker – 10 years CFL Toronto Argonauts/Hamilton Tiger-Cats/Edmonton Eskimos, Winner 1976 Frank M Gibson Trophy CFL Outstanding Rookie Eastern Division, 2 Time Eastern Division All-Star, 1981 Grey Cup Canadian MVP, 3 time Grey Cup Champion
- Miles Gorrell – Offensive tackle – 19 years CFL Calgary Stampeders/Hamilton Tiger-Cats/Montreal Alouettes/Winnipeg Blue Bombers, 5 time Eastern Division All-Star, 2 time Winner Leo Dandurand Trophy CFL Outstanding Lineman Eastern Division, 5 Grey Cup Appearances, 1 time Grey Cup Champion
- Jeff Avery – Wide receiver – 6 years CFL Ottawa Rough Riders, 1 time Eastern Division All-Star, 2 Grey Cup Appearances, 1976 Grey Cup Champion
- Al Moffat – Defensive tackle – 6 years CFL Hamilton Tiger-Cats, 1 time Eastern Division All-Star, 1 Grey Cup Appearance
- Mike Murphy – Fullback – 4 years CFL, Winner 1977 Frank M. Gibson Trophy CFL Outstanding Rookie Eastern Division
- Doug Falconer – Defensive back – 4 years CFL Ottawa Rough Riders/Calgary Stampeders, 1976 Grey Cup Champion
- Tim Berryman – Linebacker – 7 years CFL Edmonton Eskimos/Ottawa Rough Riders, 1 Grey Cup Appearance
- Bill Harrison – Halfback – 5 years CFL Hamilton Tiger-Cats/Toronto Argonauts
- Ian Mac Pherson – Defensive tackle – 3 years CFL Hamilton Tiger-Cats

=== Dwight Fowler (1976–79) ===
After the undefeated '75 season, Don Gilbert stepped down and assistant coach Dwight Fowler stepped up into the head coaching role. Fowler's team was not quite the same quality of the prior team, but still made light work of opponents. The team won the 1976 Yates Cup, led by quarterback Jamie Barresi the team moved on to the Atlantic Bowl where they met the Acadia Axemen. In a tight battle, the Gee-Gees lost 18–16 to the hometown team, Ottawa's Mike Murphy was named Most Valuable Player.

=== Cam Innes era (1979–82) ===
Under Cam Innes, the 1980 Gee-Gees stepped out of the shadows and expectations of the '75 team and began the pursuit of a third Vanier Cup appearance in 10 years. The team defeated the Acadia Axemen in the Atlantic Bowl to reach the Vanier Cup final, but ran into a powerful Alberta Golden Bears team, to whom the Gee-Gees lost 40–21. Innes won the Frank Tindall Trophy for Most Outstanding Coach in the nation.

=== Joe Moss and Jim Clark (1982–83) ===
In 1982, the team posed a 7–1 record, but were unable to reach the Dunsmore Cup. The team was led by senior quarterback Rick Zmich, who became the second Gee-Gee to win the Hec Crighton in his final year.

In 1983, with Jim Clark at the helm, the Gee-Gees had fallen from their usual perch in the top of the OQIFC standings and found themselves winless midway through the season. It was at this time that Ottawa and Carleton were involved in a scandal where the teams were docked two points after swapping game tapes with each other, a practice that was only reserved for the playoffs.

=== Jim Daley era (1985–90) ===
The hire of local product Jim Daley helped the Gee-Gees return to grace after struggling under Clarke. Daley led his team to the Dunsmore Cup final in 1989.

=== Larry Ring era (1991–97) ===
The team continued to be a national powerhouse during the early and mid-1990s. The teams led by former Concordia Stinger Larry Ring won three consecutive Dunsmore Cups in 1995, 1996, and 1997.

In the 1997 season, the team went on to play in the Vanier Cup, they lost to the UBC Thunderbirds 39–23. Following the season, the Gee-Gees were stripped of their Dunsmore Cup and Churchill Bowl for the play of ineligible players.

=== Marcel Bellefeuille era (1998–2000) ===
Following the team's sanctions, the Gee-Gees brought in Marcel Bellefeuille to become to new head coach. Building off of the powerful teams of the Ring era, Bellefeuille got to work building another contending team to hopefully break the school's Vanier Cup drought.

==== 2000 Vanier Cup Champions ====
Loaded with the best Gee-Gees team in a handful of years, the 2000 Gee-Gees finally had a squad that resembled the power of the 1975 team. Led by Hec Crighton winning quarterback senior Phil Côté, the team powered through the OQIFC and into the Dunsmore Cup finals. Côté suffered an ankle injury that looked to be the nail in the coffin for the team. Backup QB James Baker took over leading Ottawa to a 20–15 win over McMaster on the road in Hamilton.

With a berth in the 36th Vanier Cup, the Gee-Gees once again had the chance to bring a second national title to the school, this time they would be successful. With one of the highest scoring finals, the Gee-Gees became champions again after downing the Regina Rams 42–39.

Côté threw two touchdowns and was awarded the Ted Morris Memorial Trophy for MVP of the game. Defensive back Scott Gordon won the Bruce Coulter Award for his performance in the backfield. Bellefeuille then departed from the team, to join the CFL ranks, where he has coached since. He is currently the Wide Receivers Coach for the BC Lions.

In 2001, the team reached the Yates Cup after a move to the OUA, the Gee-Gees ran into a McMaster team ready to exact revenge from the prior year and defeated the team 30–22.

=== Denis Piché era (2002–09) ===
Head coach Denis Piché was hired to lead the Gee-Gees for the 2002 season and during his tenure, the team excelled, but failed to bring home another Vanier Cup. The Gee-Gees won

Piché started coaching the Gee-Gees in 1994, contributing to three Dunsmore Cups and two Vanier Cup appearances, including the 2000 team. He was hired as head coach in 2002, he led the team to a 44–20 record over his career, reaching the playoffs every year.

During these years, the Gee-Gees had Yates Cup appearances in 2006 and 2007 including a 2006 Yates Cup win. Piché also received a Frank Tindall Trophy in 2006 as the CIS Coach of the Year, a Mitchell Bowl appearance in 2006 and an undefeated regular season in 2007.

=== J.P. Asselin and Brad Sinopoli (2009–12) ===
Following Piché's retirement, the Gee-Gees promoted assistant coach J.P. Asselin to take the head coaching job. Asselin inherited key pieces of the roster that would be essential in putting together the team's Yates Cup run in 2010. With All-Canadian quarterback Brad Sinopoli under centre, the team cruised to an appearance in the Yates Cup final against rival Western Mustangs. The Gee-Gees lost the game 26–25 on a last-second field goal.

Sinopoli was the fourth Gee-Gees quarterback to win the Hec Crighton that year, he then moved on to pursue a career in the CFL. He is now a standout wide receiver for the Ottawa Redblacks winning the CFL's Most Outstanding Canadian Award in 2015, and being a key member of the team's 2016 Grey Cup victory where he won the Dick Suderman Trophy as the game's Most Valuable Canadian.

=== Gary Etcheverry and mid-season firing (2012) ===
After a 5–3 season in 2011 and an early exit in the playoffs, J.P. Asselin stepped down as head coach. The school hired Gary Etcheverry to be the team's head coach for the 2012 season.

Etcheverry was one of the most experienced coaches in the nation, however came under fire after multiple players lost faith in his vision. After losing his first five games of the season, he was relieved of his duties. The Gee-Gees went on to finish with a 2–6 record and out of the playoffs for the first time since 1991.

In the 2012 season, construction delays pushed the opening of Gee-Gees Field behind schedule, and as TD Place Stadium's construction was ongoing, the team was homeless. The Gee-Gees settled on playing their home games at Beckwith Park, located 40 minutes outside of the city, close to nearby Carleton Place, Ontario. The subsequent collapse of the team and the distance from campus resulted in the season being widely regarded as a complete disaster.

=== Jamie Barresi era (2013–19) ===
Following the disastrous 2012 season, Jamie Barresi was hired for his first head coaching job at his alma mater. Barresi was the Gee-Gees starting quarterback from 1976 to 1979 and became an assistant coach with the team afterwards. His career then took him to the NCAA where he spent time coaching with Penn State, Florida, Wake Forest, and UCF. Returning to Canada in the early-2000s Barresi held CFL jobs with the Hamilton Tiger-Cats, BC Lions, Saskatchewan Roughriders, Winnipeg Blue Bombers, and Edmonton Eskimos.

With vast coaching experience under his belt, Barresi was able to right the ship in his first year. With the help of top seniors Aaron Colbon, Brendan Gillanders, and Simon Le Marquand, the team went 5–3 record and a returned to the playoffs.

The Gee-Gees opened their 2014 campaign at home on September 1, 2014, against the York Lions with a 51–7 win. Other important performances by the Gee-Gees included their 37–30 comeback win over the Queens Golden Gaels and their 38–18 win over the McMaster Marauders to put them into the playoffs. In the first round of the OUA playoffs, the Gee-Gees ended up with a long road trip to face the Windsor Lancers, who beat them 39–29 two weeks earlier. The Gee-Gees traveled into Windsor and left with a huge 46–29 victory, setting them up to face McMaster in the OUA semi-finals. After a long back-and-forth game between the Gee-Gees and the Marauders, McMaster ultimately won 42–31 and marched on through the playoffs where they ultimately lost in the Vanier Cup. All-star performances came from Ettore Lattanzio, Adam Valchuk, and Nick Lecour through the season, while Jackson Bennett was named to the All-Rookie team.

The Gee-Gees had high hopes for their 2015 season after two straight winning season with Jamie Barresi as their head coach, but ultimately fell short. The Garnet and Grey finished eighth the OUA with a 3–5 record, their first losing record since the 2012 season. The injury-riddled season was epitomized by the Panda Game, which Carleton win in double-overtime with a score of 48–45. The 2015 Panda Game was the highest scoring game in the rivalry match's history. They finished the season fourth in the OUA offensively with 300 points, but ninth defensively giving up 331 points in the 11-team conference.

This unfavorable finish led to a coaching-overhaul during the off-season in an attempt to bring the Gee-Gees back to their winning ways. On a positive note, the Gee-Gees has several all-star and record-breaking performances from some of their players. In the final game of the season against the University of Toronto Varsity Blues, Gee-Gees receiver Ian Stewart broke the school receiving record and became the first Gee-Gees receiver ever to have over 1000 receiving yards. The records continued with quarterback Derek Wendel, who set the OUA mark for throwing yards in a game. He also broke country-wide records of completions in a single season and yards thrown in a single season. The season ended with Ian Stewart and Derek Wendel being named all-stars, while rookies Cody Cranston and Cole Beacock were named to the All-Rookie team for the Gee-Gees.

The off-season leading up to the 2016 season was crucial for the Gee-Gees, who were attempting to return to the OUA playoffs after falling short in the 2015 season. The addition of full-time coaches Jean-Vincent Posy-Audette (defensive coordinator), Nathan Taylor (special teams coordinator), and Carl Tolmie (offensive line coach) began the Gee-Gees' journey back to the post-season.

The adjustments to the coaching staff paid off, as the team finished 6-2 and returned to playoff action in 2016. The team opened the season with a 65–1 victory over the Waterloo Warriors, a victory that would set the tone for the rest of the season. Highlights of the season included a 30–8 win over the McMaster Marauders, their 31–28 overtime victory over the Guelph Gryphons, and their 42–41 overtime victory over the Queens Gaels which was won by a 2-point conversion attempt that was tipped by a Golden Gaels defender in the end zone but was ultimately reeled in by Mitchell Baines.

The annual Panda Game took place in front of a sellout crowd of 23,329 at Lansdowne Park. Each team looked strong to begin the game, but the Carleton Ravens ultimately won the game 43–23, extending their win streak to 3 years. After strong regular seasons by both the Gee-Gees and Ravens, the two teams were set to square off in the first round of the OUA playoffs. The game took place at MNP Park with the Ravens taking the victory 45–9.

For the Gee-Gees, Derek Wendel, Mitchell Baines, Lewis Ward, and Jackson Bennett were named OUA All-Stars. Wendel and Baines were also named to the All-Canadian team, while Patrick Spelman, Piriyanthan Sinnathurai, and Tramayne Clark-Stephen were named to the All-Rookie team.

Most recently, Gee-Gees standout wide receiver Mitchell Baines began his professional career after signing a contract with the Saskatchewan Roughriders. He led all players in receiving yards with 984, and ranked third in touchdowns with 8. Fellow Gee-Gees football stars Derek Wendel and Osas Obas took part in the NFL Regional Combine in Minnesota. Derek Wendel, Osas Obas, and Lewis Ward all took part in the CFL Regional Combine in Montreal.

It was announced on March 20, 2020, that Barresi was leaving the program.

== Home venues ==
- Varsity Oval (1881–1953)
- Lansdowne Park/Frank Clair Stadium (1954–2011)
- Beckwith Park (2012)
- Gee-Gees Field (2013–2021)
- TD Place Stadium (for the Panda Game) (2014–present)

== Traditions and rivalries ==
=== Panda Game ===
In 1955, Bryan McNulty, a University of Ottawa student and associate editor for the Fulcrum, decided to promote the rivalry between his school and Carleton University. He asked a local jeweller, Jack Snow, to donate a stuffed panda that would be named "Pedro" to be used as a Gee-Gee mascot (as they had not adopted the Gee-Gee horse mascot yet). McNulty later convinced Snow to display the panda in his front window and then organized the first "Pandanapping", a ritual in which Pedro would be stolen from each campus in various ways. "Pandanapping" would progress over the years to the point where major vandalism was involved and almost jeopardized the game's future.

In a short matter of time, both Pedro and the Panda Game itself became national icons. In 1958, after a 25-0 Gee-Gee victory, Pedro went on a world tour. He made visits to McGill University in Montréal, Dalhousie University in Halifax, the University of Western Ontario in London, Ontario, the University of British Columbia in Vancouver, UCLA in Los Angeles, and Alabama State University in Montgomery. It is said that Pedro was even sent to Peru, Mexico and Europe.

The game quickly became the most well-known football game in Canada behind the Grey Cup and the Vanier Cup. The attendance at the Panda Game often was higher than that of the Vanier Cup that same season.

In 1998, it was decided that Carleton University would be cancelling their football program at the end of the season after numerous years of sustained losses. This decision rendered the Panda Game tradition dead and left the Gee-Gees as the lone collegiate football team in the city for the first time in 53 years.

2013's the Panda Game returned to a great success. Approximately 4,000 fans packed into the brand-new Gee-Gees Field, the game resulted in the Gee-Gees getting their hands on a Pedro trophy after a dominant 35–10 win.

In 2014 the game moved back to Lansdowne, being played for the first time at TD Place.

In 2016, the Panda Game was nationally televised and had a game day attendance of 23,329 fans at the sold out TD Place, which is the highest attendance total in modern history to watch a regular season U Sports football game.

== Championships ==
=== Vanier Cups ===
Year	Head coach	Record	Conference record	Postseason
1975	Don Gilbert	11–0	8–0	Won Yates Cup; Won Churchill Bowl
2000	Marcel Bellefeuille	7–1	5–1	Won Dunsmore Cup; Won Churchill Bowl
National Championships			2	

=== National Championships (pre-Vanier Cup) ===
Year	Conference	Title
1894	CRU	National Champion
1896	CRU	National Champion
1897	CRU	National Champion
1901	CRU	National Champion
National Championships		4

=== Conference championships ===
Year	Head coach	Conference	Title
1907	N/A	CIAU	Yates Cup
1975	Don Gilbert	OUAA	Yates Cup
1976	Dwight Fowler	OUAA	Yates Cup
1980	Cam Innes	OQIFC	Dunsmore Cup
1995	Larry Ring	OQIFC	Dunsmore Cup
1996	Larry Ring	OQIFC	Dunsmore Cup
1997	Larry Ring	OQIFC	Dunsmore Cup*
2000	Marcel Bellefeuille	OUAA	Yates Cup
2006	Denis Piché	OUA	Yates Cup
Conference Championships			8

(*Forced to forfeit post-season titles in 1997 because of ineligible players)

== National award winners ==
- Hec Crighton Trophy: Paul Paddon (1970), Rick Zmich (1982), Phil Côté (1999), Brad Sinopoli (2010)
- J. P. Metras Trophy: Boyd Young (1984), Chris Gioskos (1989), Ettore Lattanzio (2014)
- Peter Gorman Trophy: Mike Fabiilli (1982), Chris Banton (1989)
- Russ Jackson Award: Naim El-Far (2006), Francis Perron (2021)
- Frank Tindall Trophy: Don Gilbert (1975), Cam Innes (1980), Denis Piché (2006)

== Head coaches ==
Name	Years	Notes
Unknown	1881–1906	
Father William Stanton	1907–14	
Unknown	1941–1927	
Rev. Father Joseph Hebert	1928–1931	
Rev. Fathers Andrew Carey and Philip Cornellier	1932	
Unknown	1933	
Leo Gleason	1934	
Don Wood	1935	
Allie Garland	1936	
Lou Cote	1937	
Wib Nixon	1938–1939	
Johnny Dufour	1940–1941	
No team	1942–1945	
Wib Nixon	1946	
Ted Edwards	1947	
Arnie McWatters	1948	
Ted Edwards	1949–50	
Brian Lynch	1951–52	
Merv Bonney, Andy Brunet, and Bob McClelland	1953	
Matt Anthony	1954–68	
Unknown	1969	
Bob O'Billovich	1970	
Don Gilbert	1971–75	National championship (Vanier Cup in 1975)
Dwight Fowler	1976–79	
Cam Innes	1980–81	
Joe Moss	1982	
Jim Clark	1983–84	
Jim Daley	1985–90	
Larry Ring	1991–97	
Marcel Bellefeuille	1998–2000	National championship (Vanier Cup in 2000)
Andy McEvoy	2001	
Denis Piché	2002–09	
J.P. Asselin	2009–11	
Gary Etcheverry	2012	
Jamie Barresi	2013–19	
Marcel Bellefeuille	2020–present	

== Season-by-season record ==
The following is the record of the University of Ottawa Gee-Gees football team since 2000:

Season	Games	Won	Lost	PCT	PF	PA	Standing	playoffs
2000	8	7	1	0.875	292	52	2nd in OQIFC	Defeated McGill Redmen in semi-final 50–3; Defeated Laval Rouge et Or in Dunsmore Cup 26–9; Defeated McMaster Marauders in Churchill Bowl 20–15; Defeated Regina Rams in 36th Vanier Cup 42-39
2001	8	6	2	0.750	247	168	2nd in OUA	Defeated Guelph Gryphons in quarter-final 38–15; Defeated Queen's Golden Gaels in semi-final 47–12; Lost to McMaster Marauders in Yates Cup 30–22
2002	8	5	3	0.625	218	152	5th in OUA	Lost to York Yeomen in quarter-final 12–4
2003	8	3	5	0.375	216	200	6th in OUA	Lost to Laurier Golden Hawks in quarter-final 38–17
2004	8	5	3	0.625	190	236	4th in OUA	Defeated Guelph Gryphons in quarter-final 33–9; Lost to Laurier Golden Hawks in semi-final 46–7
2005	8	6	2	0.625	305	137	3rd in OUA	Defeated Guelph Gryphons in quarter-final 35–21; Lost to Western Mustangs in semi-final 18–10
2006	8	7	1	0.875	276	97	1st in OUA	Defeated Queen's Golden Gaels in semi-final 23–10; Defeated Laurier Golden Hawks in Yates Cup 32–14; Lost to Saskatchewan Huskies in Mitchell Bowl 35–28
2007	8	8	0	1.000	312	110	1st in OUA	Lost to Western Mustangs in semi-final 23–16
2008	8	4	4	0.500	297	187	5th in OUA	Defeated Guelph Gryphons in quarter-final 42–37; Defeated Queen's Golden Gaels in semi-final 23–13; Lost to Western Mustangs in Yates Cup 31–17
2009	8	6	2	0.750	260	169	4th in OUA	Lost to McMaster Marauders in quarter-final 27–15
2010	8	7	1	0.875	291	168	1st in OUA	Defeated Laurier Golden Hawks in semi-final 32–31; Lost to Western Mustangs in Yates Cup 26–25
2011	8	5	3	0.625	245	199	4th in OUA	Lost to Windsor Lancers in quarter-final 50–33
2012	8	2	6	0.250	246	260	8th in OUA	Did not qualify
2013	8	5	3	0.625	276	253	5th in OUA	Lost to McMaster Marauders in quarter-final 41–7
2014	8	5	3	0.625	285	204	5th in OUA	Defeated Windsor Lancers in quarter-final 46–29; Lost to McMaster Marauders in semi-final 42–31
2015	8	3	5	0.375	300	331	8th in OUA	Did not qualify
2016	8	6	2	0.750	303	227	5th in OUA	Lost to Carleton Ravens in quarter-final 45–9
2017	8	5	3	0.625	190	215	4th in OUA	Lost to Guelph Gryphons in quarter-final 30–8
2018	8	6	2	0.750	211	179	2nd in OUA	Lost to Guelph Gryphons in semi-final 27–22
2019	8	5	3	0.625	252	197	4th in OUA	Lost to Waterloo Warriors in quarter-final 44–21
2020	Season cancelled due to COVID-19 pandemic							
2021	6	3	3	0.500	92	124	3rd in OUA East	Defeated Toronto Varsity Blues in quarter-final 27–22; Lost to Queen's Gaels in semi-final 32–15
2022	8	6	2	0.750	243	129	3rd in OUA	Defeated Windsor Lancers in quarter-final 43–40; Lost to Queen's Gaels in semi-final 35–13
2023	8	4	4	0.500	171	187	5th in OUA	Lost to Queen's Gaels in quarter-final 15–10
2024	8	4	4	0.500	206	187	6th in OUA	Lost to Guelph Gryphons in quarter-final 26–15
2025	8	4	4	0.500	204	203	6th in OUA	Lost to Windsor Lancers in quarter-final 31–24
2026	8	4	4	0.500	224	209	6th in OUA	Defeated McMaster Marauders in quarter-final 33–17; Lost to Queen's Gaels in semi-final 45–27

== National postseason results ==
Vanier Cup Era (1965-current)
Year	Game	Opponent	Result
1970	Atlantic Bowl Vanier Cup	UNB Manitoba	W 24-13 L 11-38
1975	Churchill Bowl Vanier Cup	Windsor Calgary	W 45-6 W 14-9
1976	Atlantic Bowl	Acadia	L 16-18
1980	Atlantic Bowl Vanier Cup	Acadia Alberta	W 28-8 L 21-40
1995	Churchill Bowl	Calgary	L 7-37
1996	Atlantic Bowl	St. Francis Xavier	L 5-13
1997	Churchill Bowl Vanier Cup	Waterloo UBC	W 44-37 L 23-39
2000	Churchill Bowl Vanier Cup	McMaster Regina	W 20-15 W 42-39
2006	Mitchell Bowl	Saskatchewan	L 28-35

Ottawa is 5-4 in national semi-final games and 2-3 in the Vanier Cup.

== Gee-Gees in the CFL ==
As of the start of the 2026 CFL season, four former Gee-Gees players are on CFL teams' rosters or practice squads:

- Eric Cumberbatch, Ottawa Redblacks
- Daniel Oladejo, Winnipeg Blue Bombers
- Zack Pelehos, Ottawa Redblacks
- James Peter, Ottawa Redblacks
