= Brian Dobie =

Canadian gridiron football coach (born 1953)

Profile
- Position: Head coach

Personal information
- Born: February 16, 1953 (age 73); Ottawa, Ontario, Canada

Career information
- University: Manitoba

Career history
- 1996–2024: Manitoba Bisons (HC)

Awards and highlights
- Vanier Cup champion (2007); CIAU Coach of the Year (2001); 5x Canada West Coach of the Year (1999, 2000, 2001, 2002, 2006)

Brian Dobie (born February 16, 1953) is a Canadian former football coach who was the head coach for the University of Manitoba's football team, the Manitoba Bisons for 29 years. He led the Bisons to two Vanier Cup appearances including a championship victory in 2007. He has won five Canada West Coach of the Year awards and was also named CIAU Coach of the Year in 2001. He played wide receiver for the Bisons.

== Early life ==
Dobie was born in Ottawa, Ontario and was adopted shortly after. After his parents separated, he moved with his mother to her home province of Manitoba where they lived in several small towns. They then moved to Winnipeg when Dobie was in grade 9 where they eventually settled and he attended high school.

== Coaching career ==
Dobie became head coach for the Manitoba Bisons football team in 1996 after serving as head coach for Churchill High School in Winnipeg for 21 years. After taking over a team that had finished 0–8 in 1995, Dobie led the Bisons to a first-place finish and Hardy Cup appearance in 2000. In 2001, the Bisons again finished in first place in Canada West, but won the Hardy Cup for the first time since 1973. The team also appeared in the Vanier Cup game for the first time since 1970, but lost the 37th Vanier Cup to the Saint Mary's Huskies.

In 2007, Dobie led the Bisons to an undefeated regular season and another first-place finish. He won his second Hardy Cup after defeating the Regina Rams and after a Mitchell Bowl victory over the Western Mustangs, the Bisons appeared in the 43rd Vanier Cup. In a rematch with the Saint Mary's Huskies, Dobie led the Bisons to a 28–14 victory and he won his first national championship.

After missing the playoffs in the four seasons following their championship win, the Bisons returned to the playoffs in 2013 and lost the Hardy Cup game in 2014. With a 4–4 record in 2015, Dobie and the Bisons upset the Calgary Dinos 27–15 in the Hardy Cup game and he won his third conference championship.

The Bisons qualified for the Hardy Cup game in 2021, but the team lost to the Saskatchewan Huskies.

On August 12, 2024, Dobie announced that the 2024 season would be his last as head coach of the Bisons. He led the Bisons to a first-place finish in the regular season with a 7–1 record, but the team was upset in the Hardy Cup game by the Regina Rams.

=== Legacy ===
Dobie has the most wins in Bisons football history with a record of 114–106–1 as of 2024. Including a post-season record of 14–16, his 128 wins are the 12th-most wins in U Sports history and the fourth most in Canada West. He coached Israel Idonije and David Onyemata, who both played in the National Football League, and has coached 64 student-athletes who were drafted by Canadian Football League teams. Under Dobie, Reina Ilzuka became the first female player in Bisons history and Maya Turner became the first female player to score points in a regular season game in U Sports football history.

Dobie has also been a part-time commentator for U Sports and CFL football coverage on TSN.

== Head coaching record ==
Year	Team	Overall	Conference	Standing	Bowl/playoffs
Manitoba Bisons (Canada West) (1996–2024)
1996	Manitoba	0–8	0–8	5th	
1997	Manitoba	3–5	3–5	4th	
1998	Manitoba	0–8	0–8	5th	
1999	Manitoba	5–4	5–3	3rd	
2000	Manitoba	7–2–1	6–1–1	1st	L Hardy
2001	Manitoba	10–2	7–1	1st	W Hardy, W Churchill, L Vanier
2002	Manitoba	8–1	8–0	1st	
2003	Manitoba	3–5	3–5	6th	
2004	Manitoba	3–5	3–5	5th	
2005	Manitoba	4–5	4–4	3rd	
2006	Manitoba	9–1	8–0	1st	L Hardy
2007	Manitoba	12–0	8–0	1st	W Hardy, W Mitchell, W Vanier
2008	Manitoba	3–5	3–5	5th	
2009	Manitoba	2–5	2–5	6th	
2010	Manitoba	2–6	2–6	5th	
2011	Manitoba	4–4	4–4	4th	
2012	Manitoba	4–5	4–4	4th	
2013	Manitoba	6–4	5–3	2nd	L Hardy
2014	Manitoba	6–5	4–4	3rd	W Hardy, L Uteck
2015	Manitoba	5–4	5–3	3rd	
2016	Manitoba	3–5	3–5	5th	
2017	Manitoba	2–6	2–6	6th	
2018	Manitoba	3–6	3–5	4th	
2019	Manitoba	4–5	4–4	4th	
2020	Season cancelled due to COVID-19 pandemic				
2021	Manitoba	5–3	4–2	2nd	L Hardy
2022	Manitoba	4–5	4–4	4th	
2023	Manitoba	3–6	3–5	4th	
2024	Manitoba	7–2	7–1	1st	
Manitoba:		128–122–1	114–106–1		
Total:		128–122–1			

All seasons recorded by Canada West.

== Personal life ==
Dobie resides in Winnipeg with his wife, Jackie, and they have a daughter, Caleigh.
