= 2014 Carleton Ravens football team =

College football season

2014 Carleton Ravens football
- Conference: Ontario University Athletics
- Record: 4–4 (4–4 OUA)
- Head coach: Steve Sumarah
- Home stadium: Keith Harris Stadium

The 2014 Carleton Ravens football team represented Carleton University in the 2014 CIS football season. The Ravens played in their 53rd season overall and their second season of Canadian Interuniversity Sport play after a 15-year hiatus. On September 1, when they defeated the Waterloo Warriors 33-14, the team earned the first win for a Ravens football team in 16 years, as the team went winless in 2013. The season ended October 25 with a loss at home against Queen's Gaels, finishing out of the playoffs, but with a 4-4 record.

== Roster ==
#	Player	Position
1	Nick Gorgichuk	QB
2	Tunde Adeleke	DB
3	Kwasi Adusei	
4	M. Domagala	K
5	Andrew Ellis	WR
6	Jesse Mills	QB
7	Lucas Brenton	DB
8	Dexter Brown	WR
9	Keith Graham	RB
11	Nathaniel Behar	WR
12	K. Van Wynsberg	WR
13	Wilson Birch	WR
14	T. Chakwesha	DB
16	Justin Howell	
18	Adam Zussino	QB
19	D. Vaillancourt	WR
20	Phoenix Molen	LB
21	Randy Ouaton	DB
22	M. Patterson	RB
23	N. Hamlin	DB
24	Rick Rhodenizer	DB
25	Bamki Adewale	DB
27	J. Zlatinszky	K
28	James McCallum	DB
29	Daniel McNicoll	WR
30	Jahvari Bennett	RB
31	Michael Black	DB
32	S. Napolitano	RB
33	Dsean Thelwel	DB
34	Trevelle Wisdom	LB
38	Raishaun Provo	RB
40	Conner Picco	LB
41	Ryan Kublek	
44	Leon Cenerini	LB
45	Emilio Gallotta	LB
47	Thomas Knapp	DB
51	E. Barthelemy	LB
52	Elliot Nelson	LB
54	Carlo Gallotta	LB
55	Kwabena Asare	
58	Eric Fowler	OL
88	Malcolm Carter	WR
89	Tyler Callahan	WR
90	George Saloum	DL
91	Zach Annen	DL
92	Jeremy Rioux	DL
93	B. Hawkins	
95	Onyeka Kene	DL
96	Bowen Tevin	DL
97	Stefan Carty	
98	Josh Cardillo	DL
99	Emmaunel Adusei	DL

== Regular season ==
The Ravens played an 8-game schedule, playing all but two OUA football teams, the Western Mustangs and the York Lions.

#	Date	Visitor	Score	Home	Record	Site	Attendance	Box Score
1	September 1	Carleton Ravens	33-14	Waterloo Warriors	1-0	Warrior Field, Waterloo	1,955	Recap
2	September 13	Carleton Ravens	17-37	McMaster Marauders	1-1	Ron Joyce Stadium, Hamilton	2,150	Recap
3	September 20	Ottawa Gee-Gees	31-33	Carleton Ravens	2-1	TD Place Stadium, Ottawa	12,000	Recap
4	September 27	Carleton Ravens	3-53	Wilfrid Laurier Golden Hawks	2-2	University Stadium, Waterloo	7,370	Recap
5	October 4	Toronto Varsity Blues	32-53	Carleton Ravens	3-2	Keith Harris Stadium, Ottawa	2,500	Recap
6	October 10	Carleton Ravens	24-44	Guelph Gryphons	3-3	Alumni Field, Guelph	785	Recap
7	October 18	Windsor Lancers	21-18	Carleton Ravens	3-4	Keith Harris Stadium, Ottawa	3,000	Recap
8	October 25	Queen's Gaels	37-15	Carleton Ravens	4-4	Keith Harris Stadium, Ottawa	4,000	Recap

== Game summaries ==
=== Vs. Waterloo ===
Carleton @ Waterloo

Team	1	2	3	4	Total
• Ravens	10	2	13	8	33
Warriors	0	11	3	0	14

- Date: September 1
- Location: Warrior Field, Waterloo
- Game start: 1:07 PM EDT
- Game attendance: 1,955
- Game weather: 23°C, Sunny; Wind: 2 km/h
- Referee: F. Cooper

Carleton wins their first game in 16 years.

=== Vs. McMaster ===
Carleton @ McMaster

Team	1	2	3	4	Total
Ravens	0	3	0	14	17
• Warriors	9	8	6	14	37

- Date: September 13
- Location: Ron Joyce Stadium, Hamilton
- Game start: 1:05 PM EDT
- Game attendance: 2,150
- Game weather: 15°C, Cloudy with Showers; Wind: W 15 km/h
- Referee: M. Drinkwalter

=== Vs. Ottawa ===
Carleton wins their first Panda Game in 20 years, thanks to a last minute hail mary pass touchdown in the last play of the game by backup QB Jesse Mills.

Ottawa @ Carleton

Team	1	2	3	4	Total
Gee Gees	7	11	3	10	31
• Ravens	7	7	7	12	33

- Date: September 20
- Location: TD Place Stadium, Ottawa
- Game start: 1:00 PM EDT
- Game attendance: 12,000
- Game weather: 20°C, Overcast; Wind: 33 km/h
- Referee: Kevin Horton

=== Vs. Laurier ===
Carleton @ Laurier

Team	1	2	3	4	Total
Ravens	0	0	0	3	3
• Golden Hawks	10	24	19	0	53

- Date: September 27
- Location: University Stadium, Waterloo
- Game start: 1:07 PM EDT
- Game attendance: 7,370
- Game weather: 23°C, Sunny; Wind: 6 km/h NE
- Referee: Kevin Baird

=== Vs. Toronto ===
Toronto @ Carleton

Team	1	2	3	4	Total
Varsity Blues	0	10	7	15	32
• Ravens	16	21	6	10	53

- Date: October 4
- Location: Keith Harris Stadium, Ottawa
- Game start: 1:00 PM EDT
- Game attendance: 2,500
- Game weather: 15°C, Light Rain; Wind: 15 km/h
- Referee: Henry Chiu

=== Vs. Guelph ===
Carleton @ Guelph

Team	1	2	3	4	Total
Ravens	0	10	0	14	24
• Gryphons	3	25	6	10	44

- Date: October 10
- Location: Alumni Stadium, Guelph
- Game start: 7:00 PM EDT
- Game attendance: 785
- Referee: Henry Chiu

=== Vs. Queen's ===
Queen's @ Carleton

Team	1	2	3	4	Total
• Gaels	5	17	0	15	37
Ravens	3	0	2	10	15

- Date: October 25
- Location: Keith Harris Stadium, Ottawa
- Game start: 1:00 PM EDT
- Game attendance: 4000
- Game weather: 13°C, Mostly cloudy; Wind: 0 km/h
- Referee: K. Horton
