= Ronald Lancaster =

Ronald Lancaster may refer to:

- Ron Lancaster (1938–2008), Canadian Football League quarterback
- Ron Lancaster Jr. (1963–2013) Canadian football coach
- Ronald Lancaster (chemist) (1931–2026), British chemist, founder of Kimbolton Fireworks
