= Paddon =

Paddon is a surname. Notable people with the name include:

- Brian Paddon DSO (1908–1967), Royal Air Force pilot who escaped from Colditz Castle during WWII
- Graham Paddon (1950–2007), English footballer
- Harry Paddon (1881–1939), British doctor and medical missionary in Canada
- Hayden Paddon (born 1987), New Zealand rally driver
- James Paddon (1811–1861), English navigator-merchant, pioneer in New Hebrides and New Caledonia
- Jim Paddon (1884–1966), Australian who won the professional World Sculling Championship
- Kelli Paddon, Canadian politician in the Legislative Assembly of British Columbia
- Paul Paddon, quarterback for the University of Ottawa Gee Gee's
- Susan Paddon, Canadian poet
- Tony Paddon, OC (1914–1995), Canadian surgeon, lieutenant governor of Newfoundland
