= Gary Etcheverry =

American-born American and Canadian football coach

Profile
- Position: DC

Personal information
- Born: November 17, 1956 (age 69)

Career information
- College: Southern California

Career history
- 1980–1981: San Francisco State (Ass. coach)
- 1982–1987: Occidental (DC)
- 1988: Los Angeles Rams (Ass. STC)
- 1989: Occidental (DC)
- 1990–93: Macalester (HC)
- 1994: Hamburg Blue Devils (HC, OC, DC)
- 1994–1995: Redlands (DC, DLC)
- 1996: Stuttgart Scorpions (HC)
- 1996–1997: San Diego (OLC, DLC)
- 1997–1999: Toronto Argonauts (DC, DLC)
- 2000: Saskatchewan Roughriders (DC, LC, DLC)
- 2001: BC Lions (DC)
- 2002: Toronto Argonauts (HC)
- 2004: Ottawa Renegades (LC, DLC)
- 2005: UBC (DLC, STC)
- 2006: Big Kahuna Rams (OC)
- 2008–2010: Saskatchewan Roughriders (DC)
- 2012: Ottawa (ON) (HC)
- 2014: Winnipeg Blue Bombers (DC)

Awards and highlights
- Won 85th Grey Cup

Gary Etcheverry (born November 17, 1956) is an American-born American and Canadian football coach who has coached in the National Football League, Canadian Football League, German Football League, Canadian Junior Football League, CIS, and the NCAA.

== Coaching career ==
After graduating from USC in 1978, he began coaching at the University of San Diego where he was the offensive line and defensive line coach. His next job was as the defensive coordinator and defensive line coach at the University of Redlands. In 1981, he was an offensive and defensive assistant at San Francisco State University. His offensive coordinator at SFSU was Mike Holmgren.

In 1982, Etcheverry began a seven-year tenure as defensive coordinator at Occidental College. He coached with the Tigers from 1982 to 1987, leaving in 1988 to serve as a special assistant with the Los Angeles Rams. He returned to Occidental for one more season before accepting the head coaching position at Macalester College. He was fired after a 0–10 season in 1993. In his four seasons with the Fighting Scots, he had a 2–37 overall record.

In 1994, he moved to the German Football League where he was the defensive coordinator of the Hamburg Blue Devils before becoming head coach of the Stuttgart Scorpions in 1996.

In 1997 he returned to North America, this time as the defensive line coach of the Toronto Argonauts. In 1999 he was promoted to defensive coordinator by head coach Jim Barker. He left the team before the 2000 season after head coach John Huard chewed out the defense during a press conference, despite it being among the best in the league, leading in 12 of 25 statistical categories and coach Huard never seeing the team play a game. After leaving the Argos, he was Danny Barrett's defensive coordinator with the Saskatchewan Roughriders and in 2001 was the defensive coordinator of the BC Lions.

In 2002 he was hired by team President Pinball Clemons to serve as the Toronto Argonauts head coach. He was fired after a 4–8 start and replaced by Pinball Clemons.

In 2004 he replaced Kit Lathrop as defensive coordinator of the Ottawa Renegades. After one season in Ottawa, he was hired as special teams coordinator and assistant defensive coordinator for the UBC Thunderbirds. In 2006, he was an assistant with the South Surrey Big Kahuna Rams as well as a guest coach at the Winnipeg Blue Bombers training camp.

On April 7, 2008, Etcheverry joined the Saskatchewan Roughriders as their defensive assistant coach. On January 26, 2009, he was named defensive coordinator for the Saskatchewan Roughriders.

Etcheverry was hired as the head coach for the Ottawa Gee-Gees on May 23, 2012, following the resignation of Jean-Phillipe Asselin. After the team with winless in its first five games of the 2012 season, Etcheverry and most of his staff was fired.

On February 20, 2014, Etcheverry was announced as the defensive coordinator for the Winnipeg Blue Bombers. After leading the team to an average of 360.9 yards allowed per game in the 2014 CFL season, Head Coach, Mike O'Shea announced that Etcheverry had relieved of his duties.

== Head coaching record ==
=== CFL ===
Team	Year	Regular season					Postseason		
Team	Year	Won	Lost	Ties	Win %	Finish	Won	Lost	Result
TOR	2002	4	8	0	.333	4th in East Division	–	–	(fired)

=== CIS ===
Team	Year	Regular season					Postseason		
Team	Year	Won	Lost	Ties	Win %	Finish	Won	Lost	Result
UOGG	2012	0	5	0	.000	Last in OUA	–	–	(fired before season close)

=== College ===
Year	Team	Overall	Conference	Standing	Bowl/playoffs
Macalester Scots (Minnesota Intercollegiate Athletic Conference) (1990–1993)
1990	Macalester	1–9	1–8	9th	
1991	Macalester	1–8	0–8	10th	
1992	Macalester	0–10	0–9	10th	
1993	Macalester	0–10	0–9	10th	
Macalester:		2–37	1–34		
Total:		2–37			
