= Don Gilbert =

American gridiron football player and coach (born 1943)

Profile
- Position: Defensive back Head Coach

Personal information
- Born: October 6, 1943 (age 83); Buffalo, New York, U.S.
- Listed height: 5 ft 10 in (1.78 m)
- Listed weight: 196 lb (89 kg)

Career information
- College: University of Buffalo

Career history

Playing
- 1965–1967: Ottawa Rough Riders
- 1968: Winnipeg Blue Bombers

Coaching
- 1971–1975: Ottawa Gee-Gees

Awards and highlights
- Vanier Cup champion - 1975

Don Gilbert (born October 6, 1943) was an American professional football player and coach. He played four seasons in the Canadian Football League (CFL) for the Ottawa Rough Riders and Winnipeg Blue Bombers. He then went on to coach four seasons for the Ottawa Gee-Gees, winning the Vanier Cup in 1975. He played college football for the Buffalo Bulls.

He played high school football while attending Bennett High School in Buffalo, New York.
