= 2014 CIS football season =

- Duration: September 1 – November 1
- Hardy Cup champions: Manitoba Bisons
- Yates Cup champions: McMaster Marauders
- Dunsmore Cup champions: Montreal Carabins
- Loney Bowl champions: Mount Allison Mounties
- Mitchell Bowl champions: McMaster Marauders
- Uteck Bowl champions: Montreal Carabins

Vanier Cup
- Date: November 29
- Venue: Montreal, Quebec
- Champions: Montreal Carabins

CIS football seasons seasons
- 2013 2015

The 2014 CIS football season began on September 1, 2014 with ten Ontario University Athletics teams playing that day. The season concluded on November 29 with the 50th Vanier Cup championship at Molson Stadium in Montreal. This year, 27 university teams in Canada are scheduled to play Canadian Interuniversity Sport football, the highest level of amateur Canadian football.

== Regular season standings ==
2014 Canada West standings
(Rank) Team	W		L	PTS	Playoff Spot
#4 Calgary	6	-	2	12	†
#8 Saskatchewan	6	-	2	12	X
Manitoba	4	-	4	8	X
Regina	3	-	5	6	X
Alberta	3	-	5	6	
UBC	2	-	6	4	
† – Conference Champion; Rankings: CIS Top 10

2014 OUA standings
(Rank) Team	W		L	PTS	Playoff Spot
#3 McMaster	7	-	1	14	†
#5 Guelph	7	-	1	14	X
#7 Western	6	-	2	12	X
Windsor	5	-	3	10	X
#10 Ottawa	5	-	3	10	X
Laurier	4	-	4	8	X
Carleton	4	-	4	8	
Queen's	3	-	5	6	
Toronto	2	-	6	4	
Waterloo	1	-	7	2	
York	0	-	8	0	
† – Conference Champion; Rankings: CIS Top 10

2014 RSEQ standings
	Overall				Conf			Playoff Spot
(Rank) Team	W		L	PTS	W		L	Playoff Spot
#1 Laval	7	-	1	14	7	-	1	†
#2 Montreal	7	-	1	14	6	-	1	X
#8 Sherbrooke	5	-	3	10	4	-	3	X
Concordia	5	-	3	10	4	-	3	X
Bishop's	1	-	7	2	1	-	6	
McGill	0	-	8	0	0	-	8	
† – Conference Champion; Rankings: CIS Top 10

2014 AUS standings
	Overall				Conf			Playoff Spot
(Rank) Team	W		L	PTS	W		L	Playoff Spot
#6 Mount Allison	8	-	0	16	7	-	0	†
St. FX	4	-	4	8	4	-	3	X
Acadia	3	-	5	6	3	-	4	X
Saint Mary's	0	-	8	0	0	-	7	
† – Conference Champion; Rankings: CIS Top 10

=== Top 10 ===
FRC-CIS Top 10 Rankings
Team \ Week	1	2	3	4	5	6	7	8	9	10
Acadia Axemen	11 (36)	NR	15 (1)	NR	NR	NR	NR	NR	NR	NR
Alberta Golden Bears	NR	NR	NR	NR	NR	12 (5)	NR	NR	NR	NR
Bishop's Gaiters	15 (14)	NR	NR	NR	NR	NR	NR	NR	NR	NR
Calgary Dinos	2 (260)	2 (269)	2 (267)	2 (267)	2 (267)	2 (267)	2 (267)	2 (267)	2 (270)	4 (216)
Carleton Ravens	19 (1)	NR	NR	NR	NR	NR	NR	NR	NR	NR
Concordia Stingers	NR	16 (1)	10 (14)	9 (84)	9 (64)	9 (72)	9 (44)	8 (78)	11 (9)	12 (1)
Guelph Gryphons	8 (60)	7 (101)	6 (128)	6 (154)	6 (147)	6 (157)	6 (150)	4 (193)	5 (183)	5 (184)
Laurier Golden Hawks	14 (16)	NR	14 (2)	12 (1)	12 (2)	10 (17)	11 (1)	NR	12 (3)	NR
Laval Rouge et Or	1 (300-30)	1 (300-30)	1 (300-30)	1 (300-30)	1 (300-30)	1 (300-30)	1 (300-30)	1 (300-30)	1 (300-30)	1 (288-18)
Manitoba Bisons	6 (140)	12 (21)	9 (61)	10 (47)	10 (47)	14 (1)	NR	9 (48)	12 (3)	11 (23)
McGill Redmen	NR	NR	NR	NR	NR	NR	NR	NR	NR	NR
McMaster Marauders	5 (144)	4 (201)	4 (194)	4 (208)	4 (206)	3 (243)	3 (243)	3 (242)	4 (217)	3 (231)
Montreal Carabins	4 (164)	5 (163)	5 (172)	5 (171)	5 (175)	5 (167)	5 (178)	4 (193)	3 (223)	2 (274-12)
Mount Allison Mounties	13 (20)	10 (34)	8 (74)	8 (107)	8 (89)	8 (100)	7 (115)	7 (126)	6 (143)	6 (156)
Ottawa Gee-Gees	16 (12)	8 (68)	12 (10)	NR	NR	NR	NR	NR	10 (23)	10 (24)
Queen's Golden Gaels	9 (56)	15 (4)	NR	NR	NR	NR	NR	NR	NR	NR
Regina Rams	17 (6)	11 (25)	NR	NR	NR	NR	NR	NR	NR	NR
Saint Mary's Huskies	NR	NR	NR	NR	NR	NR	NR	NR	NR	NR
Saskatchewan Huskies	10 (56)	6 (144)	7 (127)	7 (114)	7 (105)	7 (114)	8 (111)	10 (34)	8 (92)	8 (99)
Sherbrooke Vert et Or	12 (26)	9 (61)	11 (14)	14 (1)	13 (2)	11 (8)	12 (1)	11 (33)	9 (54)	9 (50)
St. Francis Xavier X-Men	NR	13 (10)	NR	13 (1)	NR	NR	NR	NR	NR	NR
Toronto Varsity Blues	NR	NR	NR	NR	NR	NR	NR	NR	NR	NR
UBC Thunderbirds	7 (80)	14 (9)	NR	NR	NR	NR	NR	NR	NR	NR
Waterloo Warriors	NR	NR	NR	NR	NR	NR	NR	NR	NR	NR
Western Mustangs	3 (250)	3 (242)	3 (243)	3 (241)	3 (241)	4 (196)	4 (186)	6 (135)	7 (134)	7 (109)
Windsor Lancers	18 (2)	NR	13 (10)	11 (2)	11 (5)	13 (5)	10 (44)	12 (4)	NR	NR
York Lions	NR	NR	NR	NR	NR	NR	NR	NR	NR	NR

Ranks in italics are teams not ranked in the top 10 poll but received votes.
NR = Not ranked, received no votes.
Number in parentheses denotes number votes, after the dash number of first place votes.

== Post-season awards ==
CIS post-season awards
	Quebec	Ontario	Atlantic	Canada West	NATIONAL
Hec Crighton Trophy	Hugo Richard (Laval)	Dillon Campbell (Wilfrid Laurier)	Brian Jones (Acadia)	Andrew Buckley (Calgary)	Andrew Buckley (Calgary)
Presidents' Trophy	Byron Archambault (Montreal)	Nick Shortill (McMaster)	Jonathan Langa (Saint Mary's)	Mark Ingram (Saskatchewan)	Jonathan Langa (Saint Mary's)
J. P. Metras Trophy	Vincent Desloges (Laval)	Ettore Lattanzio (Ottawa)	Jacob LeBlanc (Mount Allison)	Donovan Dale (British Columbia)	Ettore Lattanzio (Ottawa)
Peter Gorman Trophy	Hugo Richard (Laval)	Daniel Petermann (McMaster)	Chris Reid (Mount Allison)	Marcus Davis (British Columbia)	Hugo Richard (Laval)
Russ Jackson Award	Alexandre Laganière (Montreal)	Adam Dickson (McMaster)	Sean Stoqua (Acadia)	Andrew Buckley (Calgary)	Andrew Buckley (Calgary)
Frank Tindall Trophy	Mickey Donovan (Concordia)	Stefan Ptaszek (McMaster)	Kelly Jeffrey (Mount Allison)	Brian Towriss (Saskatchewan)	Kelly Jeffrey (Mount Allison)

=== All-Canadian team ===
==== First team ====
Offence
QB – Andrew Buckley – Calgary
RB – Dillon Campbell – Laurier
RB – Mercer Timmis – Calgary
IR – Brett Blaszko – Calgary
IR – Mikhaïl Davidson – Montreal
WR – Addison Richards – Regina
WR – Nathaniel Behar – Carleton
C – Sean McEwen – Calgary
T – Karl Lavoie – Laval
T – Edmund Meredith – Western
G – Charles Vaillancourt – Laval
G – Sean Jamieson – Western
Defence
DT – Ettore Lattanzio – Ottawa
DT – Daryl Waud – Western
DE – Vincent Desloges – Laval
DE – Jesse St. James – Acadia
LB – Byron Archambault – Montreal
LB – Adam Konar – Calgary
LB – Jonathan Langa – Saint Mary's
FS – Kwame Adjei – Mount Allison
HB – Kristopher Robertson – Concordia
HB – Chris Ackie – Laurier
CB – Adam Laurensse – Calgary
CB – Paolo Edwards – St. Francis Xavier
Special teams
P – Boris Bede – Laval
K – Tyler Crapigna – McMaster
RET – Marcus Davis – British Columbia

==== Second team ====
Offence
QB – Hugo Richard – Laval
RB – Chris Reid – Mount Allison
RB – Ronlee King-Fileen – Bishop's
IR – Nic Demski – Manitoba
IR – Danny Vandervoort – McMaster
WR – Llevi Noel – Toronto
WR – Sébastien Blanchard – Sherbrooke
C – Jean-Christophe Labrecque – Montreal
T – David Beard – Alberta
T – Vernon Sainvil – St. Francis Xavier
G – Sukh Chungh – Calgary
G – Philippe Gagnon – Laval
Defence
DT – Donovan Dale – British Columbia
DT – Jacob LeBlanc – Mount Allison
DE – Ricky Osei-Kusi – Western
DE – Connor McGough – Calgary
LB – Curtis Newton – Guelph
LB – Drew Morris – Acadia
LB – Nicholas Shortill – McMaster
FS – Mark Ingram – Saskatchewan
HB – Elie Bouka – Calgary
HB – Demetrius Ferguson – St. Francis Xavier
CB – Joey Cupido – McMaster
CB – Josh Woodman – Western
Special teams
P – Ronnie Pfeffer – Laurier
K – Ryan Begin – Acadia
RET – Ryan Nieuwesteeg – Guelph

== Championships ==
The Vanier Cup is played between the champions of the Mitchell Bowl and the Uteck Bowl, the national semi-final games. In 2014, according to the rotating schedule, the Atlantic conference Loney Bowl champions will visit the Ontario conference's Yates Cup champion for the Mitchell Bowl. The winners of the Canada West conference Hardy Trophy will visit the Dunsmore Cup Quebec championship team for the Uteck Bowl.

== Playoff bracket ==
The Vanier Cup is played between the champions of the Mitchell Bowl and the Uteck Bowl, the national semi-final games. In 2014, according to the rotating schedule, the Quebec conference Dunsmore Cup champions will host the Hardy Trophy Canada West championship team for the Uteck Bowl. The Atlantic conference Loney Bowl champions will visit the Ontario conference's Yates Cup winner for the Mitchell Bowl.

Conference Quarter-finals
(6) Laurier Golden Hawks	10
(3) Western Ontario Mustangs	25
bye
(2) Guelph Gryphons
(5) Ottawa Gee-Gees	46
(4) Windsor Lancers	29
bye
(1) McMaster Marauders

Conference Semi-finals
(3) Acadia Axemen	17
(2) St. FX X-Men	18
bye
(1) Mount Allison Mounties
Western Ontario Mustangs	26
Guelph Gryphons	51
Ottawa Gee-Gees	31
McMaster Marauders	42
(4) Regina Rams	0
(1) Calgary Dinos	56
(3) Manitoba Bisons	47
(2) Saskatchewan Huskies	39
(3) Sherbrooke Vert et Or	13
(2) Montreal Carabins	40
(4) Concordia Stingers	18
(1) Laval Rouge et Or	74

Conference Championships
St. FX X-Men	7
Mount Allison Mounties	29
Guelph Gryphons	15
McMaster Marauders	20
Calgary Dinos	15
Manitoba Bisons	27
Montreal Carabins	12*
Laval Rouge et Or	9

National Semi-finals
Mount Allison Mounties	12
McMaster Marauders	24
Manitoba Bisons	26
Montreal Carabins	29

50th Vanier Cup
McMaster Marauders	19
Montreal Carabins	20

Number in parentheses represents seed in conference

== Teams ==
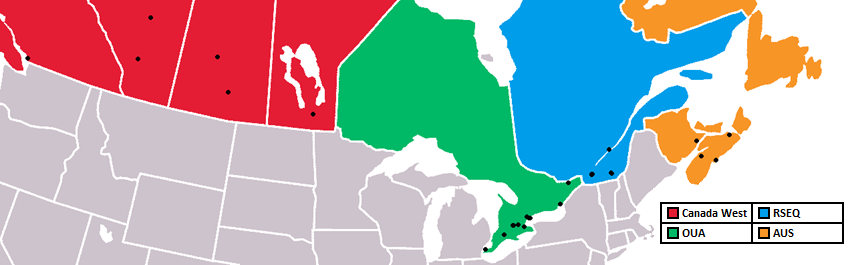

Canada West Football Conference Hardy Trophy
Institution	Team	City	Province	First season	Head coach	Enrollment	Endowment	Football stadium	Capacity
University of British Columbia	Thunderbirds	Vancouver	BC	1923	Shawn Olson	43,579	$1.01B	Thunderbird Stadium	3,500
University of Calgary	Dinos	Calgary	AB	1964	Blake Nill	28,196	$444M	McMahon Stadium	35,650
University of Alberta	Golden Bears	Edmonton	AB	1910	Chris Morris	36,435	$751M	Foote Field	3,500
University of Saskatchewan	Huskies	Saskatoon	SK	1912	Brian Towriss	19,082	$136.7M	Griffiths Stadium	6,171
University of Regina	Rams	Regina	SK	1999	Frank McCrystal	12,800	$25.9M	Mosaic Stadium at Taylor Field	32,848
University of Manitoba	Bisons	Winnipeg	MB	1920	Brian Dobie	27,599	$303M	Investors Group Field	33,422

Ontario University Athletics Yates Cup
Institution	Team	City	Province	First season	Head coach	Enrollment	Endowment	Football stadium	Capacity
University of Windsor	Lancers	Windsor	ON	1968	Joe D'Amore	13,496	$32.5M	South Campus Stadium	2,000
University of Western Ontario	Mustangs	London	ON	1929	Greg Marshall	30,000	$266.6M	TD Waterhouse Stadium	10,000
University of Waterloo	Warriors	Waterloo	ON	1957	Vacant	27,978	$172M	Warrior Field	5,200
Wilfrid Laurier University	Golden Hawks	Waterloo	ON	1961	Michael Faulds	12,394	---	University Stadium	6,000
University of Guelph	Gryphons	Guelph	ON	1950	Stu Lang	19,408	$164.2M	Alumni Stadium	4,100
McMaster University	Marauders	Hamilton	ON	1901	Stefan Ptaszek	25,688	$498.5M	Ron Joyce Stadium	6,000
University of Toronto	Varsity Blues	Toronto	ON	1877	Greg Gary	73,185	$1.823B	Varsity Stadium	5,000
York University	Lions	Toronto	ON	1969	Warren Craney	42,400	$306M	York Stadium	2,500
Queen's University	Golden Gaels	Kingston	ON	1882	Pat Sheahan	20,566	$657M	Richardson Stadium	10,258
University of Ottawa	Gee-Gees	Ottawa	ON	1894	Jamie Barresi	42,027	$184M	Gee-Gees Field	4,152
Carleton University	Ravens	Ottawa	ON	1945	Steve Sumarah	25,890	$230M	Keith Harris Stadium	3,000

Quebec University Football League Dunsmore Cup
Institution	Team	City	Province	First season	Head coach	Enrollment	Endowment	Football stadium	Capacity
Concordia University	Stingers	Montreal	QC	1974	Mickey Donovan	38,809	$54.4M	Concordia Stadium	4,000
Université de Montréal	Carabins	Montreal	QC	2002	Danny Maciocia	55,540	$89.5M	CEPSUM Stadium	5,100
McGill University	Redmen	Montreal	QC	1898	Clint Uttley	32,514	$973.6M	Molson Stadium	25,012
Université Laval	Rouge et Or	Quebec City	QC	1996	Glen Constantin	37,591	$105.3M	PEPS Stadium	12,257
Université de Sherbrooke	Vert et Or	Sherbrooke	QC	1971	David Lessard	35,000	---	Université de Sherbrooke Stadium	3,359
Bishop's University	Gaiters	Sherbrooke	QC	1884	Kevin Mackey	1,817	---	Coulter Field	2,200

Atlantic University Football Conference Jewett Trophy
Institution	Team	City	Province	First season	Head coach	Enrollment	Endowment	Football stadium	Capacity
Acadia University	Axemen	Wolfville	NS	1957	Jeff Cummins	3,770	$40M	Raymond Field	3,000
Mount Allison University	Mounties	Sackville	NB	1955	Kelly Jeffrey	2,614	$82.8M	MacAulay Field	2,500
Saint Francis Xavier University	X-Men	Antigonish	NS	1954	Gary Waterman	4,871	$59.4M	Oland Stadium	4,000
Saint Mary's University	Huskies	Halifax	NS	1956	Perry Marchese	7,433	$16.9M	Huskies Stadium	4,000
