= 5th Vanier Cup =

1969 Canadian university football championship

Manitoba Bisons	McGill Redmen
(6–0)	(6–1)
24	15
Head coach: Henry Janzen	Head coach: Tom Mooney
	1	2	3	4	Total
Manitoba Bisons	0	0	0	24	24
McGill Redmen	0	0	0	15	15
- Date: November 21, 1969
- Stadium: Varsity Stadium
- Location: Toronto
- Ted Morris Memorial Trophy: Bob Kraemer, Manitoba
- Attendance: 9,349

The 5th Vanier Cup was played on November 21, 1969, at Varsity Stadium in Toronto, Ontario, and decided the CIAU football champion for the 1969 season. The Manitoba Bisons won their first ever championship by defeating the McGill Redmen by a score of 24–15.
