= Fred Ritter =

American-born Canadian football player, coach, and administrator

Profile
- Position: Halfback

Personal information
- Born: May 8, 1882; Brooklyn, New York, U.S.
- Died: July 21, 1948 (aged 66); Westport, Connecticut, U.S.

Career information
- High school: Lawrenceville School
- College: Princeton (1904)

Career history

Playing
- 1907: Regina Civil Servants
- 1910–1913: Regina Roughriders

Coaching
- 1910–1913: Regina Roughriders; Head coach
- 1914: Princeton; Assistant coach
- 1921–1922: Manitoba; Head coach
- 1923–1924: Winnipeg Victorias Rugby Club; Head coach
- 1925–1928: Manitoba; Head coach
- 1933–1934: Winnipeg Deer Lodge; Head coach
- 1935: Winnipeg Victorias Junior Rugby Club; Head coach

Frederick William Ritter (May 8, 1882 – July 21, 1948) was an American gridiron football player and coach and lumber industry executive who was head coach of the Regina Roughriders from 1910 to 1913.

== Playing ==
Ritter was on May 8, 1882, born in Brooklyn to Frederick William and Mary (Welchman) Ritter. He graduated from the Lawrenceville School. He played halfback on the 1904 Princeton Tigers football team, but was ineligible to play in 1905 due to poor grades. In 1906, he was the backup catcher for an amateur baseball team in Millville, New Jersey. In 1907, Ritter moved to Regina, Saskatchewan and played center-half for the Regina Civil Servants football team.

== Coaching ==
Ritter joined the Regina Roughriders in 1910 and was appointed coach that October. He remained with the team until 1914, when he returned to Princeton as an assistant coach. He returned to Roughriders in 1915 as team manager.

Ritter returned to coaching in 1921 with the University of Manitoba. In 1923 and 1924, he coached the Winnipeg Victorias Rugby Club. He then returned to Manitoba. He was the coach of the Winnipeg Deer Lodge in 1933 and 1934 and the Victoria Juniors in 1935.

== Lumber industry ==
After leaving Princeton, Ritter was a yard manager for the Monarch Lumber Company in Regina and Winnipeg. In 1916, he became general manager of the North Canada Lumber Company in Prince Albert, Saskatchewan. He then spent 17 years as secretary of the Western Retail Lumberman's Association in Winnipeg. In 1937, he moved to New York City, where he was secretary-manager of the New York Lumber Trade Association until his death.

== Personal life ==
On February 8, 1910, Ritter married Aimee Rogeane Houston in Regina. They had two daughters, Rosalina and Rogeane.

Ritter died on July 21, 1948, at his home in Westport, Connecticut after a brief illness.
