= Matt Anthony =

Canadian football player (1921–2000)

Profile
- Position: End

Personal information
- Born: c. 1921; St. Catharines, Ontario, Canada
- Died: July 13, 2000 (age 79); Ottawa, Ontario, Canada
- Listed height: 5 ft 11 in (1.80 m)
- Listed weight: 185 lb (84 kg)

Career history
- 1946: Montreal Alouettes
- 1947–1948: Ottawa Rough Riders
- 1949–1950: Saskatchewan Roughriders
- 1951–1953: Ottawa Rough Riders

Awards and highlights
- Grey Cup champion (1951)

Matt Anthony (c. 1921 – July 13, 2000) was a Canadian professional football player who played for the Montreal Alouettes, Ottawa Rough Riders and Saskatchewan Roughriders. He won the Grey Cup with the Rough Riders in 1951. He was born in St. Catharines, Ontario and played junior football there for the St. Catharines Bulldogs prior to joining the Montreal Alouettes in 1946. Anthony later retired to Ottawa where he coached high school, junior (Ottawa Sooners) and university football. He was also a businessman. Anthony died of cancer in 2000. Matt Anthony Field on the campus of the University of Ottawa, opened in 2001, is named in his honour.

== Matt Anthony Field ==
Matt Anthony Field is a 675-seat multi-purpose stadium located on the University of Ottawa campus in Ottawa, Ontario. Constructed in 2001, the stadium was named in honour of Anthony. It is home to the Ottawa Gee-Gees varsity women's soccer and rugby teams as well as the men's competitive club soccer and rugby teams.
