= 11th Vanier Cup =

1975 Canadian university football championship

Calgary Dinos	Ottawa Gee-Gees
(6–2)	(7–0)
9	14
Head coach: Mike Lashuk	Head coach: Don Gilbert
	1	2	3	4	Total
Calgary Dinos	0	0	0	9	9
Ottawa Gee-Gees	0	0	0	14	14
- Date: November 21, 1975
- Stadium: Exhibition Stadium
- Location: Toronto
- Ted Morris Memorial Trophy: Neil Lumsden, Ottawa
- Attendance: 17,841

The 11th Vanier Cup was played on November 21, 1975, at Exhibition Stadium in Toronto, Ontario, and decided the CIAU football champion for the 1975 season. The Ottawa Gee-Gees won their first championship by defeating the Calgary Dinos by a score of 14–9. The Gee-Gees became the first team to win the Vanier Cup without having endured a single loss in the regular season.
