= Ron Lancaster Jr. =

Canadian football coach

Personal information
- Born: 1963
- Died: March 26, 2013 (aged 50); Hamilton, Ontario, Canada

Career information
- High school: Campbell Collegiate
- CJFL: Regina Rams (1982–1983)
- College: Princeton (1981)

Career history
- 1985–1987: Central Collegiate; Offensive co-ordinator
- 1988: Toronto; Quarterbacks coach
- 1989: McMaster; Quarterbacks coach
- 1990: Acadia; Offensive co-ordinator
- 1991–1992: Toronto Argonauts; Running backs coach
- 1993–1995: Manitoba; Head coach
- 1996–1997: Edmonton Eskimos; Offensive co-ordinator
- 1998–2003: Hamilton Tiger-Cats; Offensive co-ordinator
- 2004: Winnipeg Blue Bombers; Offensive co-ordinator
- 2005: Edmonton Eskimos; Quarterbacks coach
- 2006: Edmonton Eskimos; Receivers coach

Head coaching record
- Career: 8–16 (.333): 3x Grey Cup champion (1991, 1999, 2005)

Ron "R. D." Lancaster Jr. (1963 – March 26, 2013) was a Canadian football coach who was an assistant with the Toronto Argonauts, Winnipeg Blue Bombers, Edmonton Eskimos, and Hamilton Tiger-Cats of the Canadian Football League and head coach of the University of Manitoba Bisons.

== Early life ==
Lancaster was the son of CFL quarterback, coach and executive Ron Lancaster. He played high school football at Campbell Collegiate in Regina, Saskatchewan. He was the fourth-string quarterback for the UBC Thunderbirds in 1981, then played for the Regina Rams junior football team as a backup.

== Coaching ==
Lancaster began his coaching career in 1985 as the offensive co-ordinator at Central Collegiate in Regina. In 1988, he was an assistant coach for the University of Toronto. He then served as the quarterbacks coach for the McMaster Marauders. In 1990, he was the offensive coordinator at Acadia, where his brother Bob was the starting quarterback.

In 1991, Lancaster joined the Toronto Argonauts as their running backs coach. The team won the 79th Grey Cup that year. Midway through the 1992 season, Dennis Meyer took over as head coach and handed offensive play calling duties to Lancaster and injured quarterback Mike Kerrigan. From 1993 to 1995, Lancaster was the head coach of the Manitoba Bisons, where he had an overall coaching record of 8–16.

In 1996, Lancaster became the offensive co-ordinator under his father with the Edmonton Eskimos. Both Lancasters moved to the Hamilton Tiger-Cats in 1998 and led the team to victory in the following year's Grey Cup. He was let go following an ownership change in December 2003 and hired as offensive co-ordinator by the Winnipeg Blue Bombers He returned to the Eskimos in 2005 as quarterbacks coach and won his third Grey Cup that season. In 2006, he was Edmonton's receivers coach.

== Later life ==
In 2007, Lancaster became a teacher and coach in Hamilton, Ontario. On March 26, 2013, he was found dead in his apartment in Hamilton.
