= Ettore Lattanzio =

Professional Canadian football defensive lineman

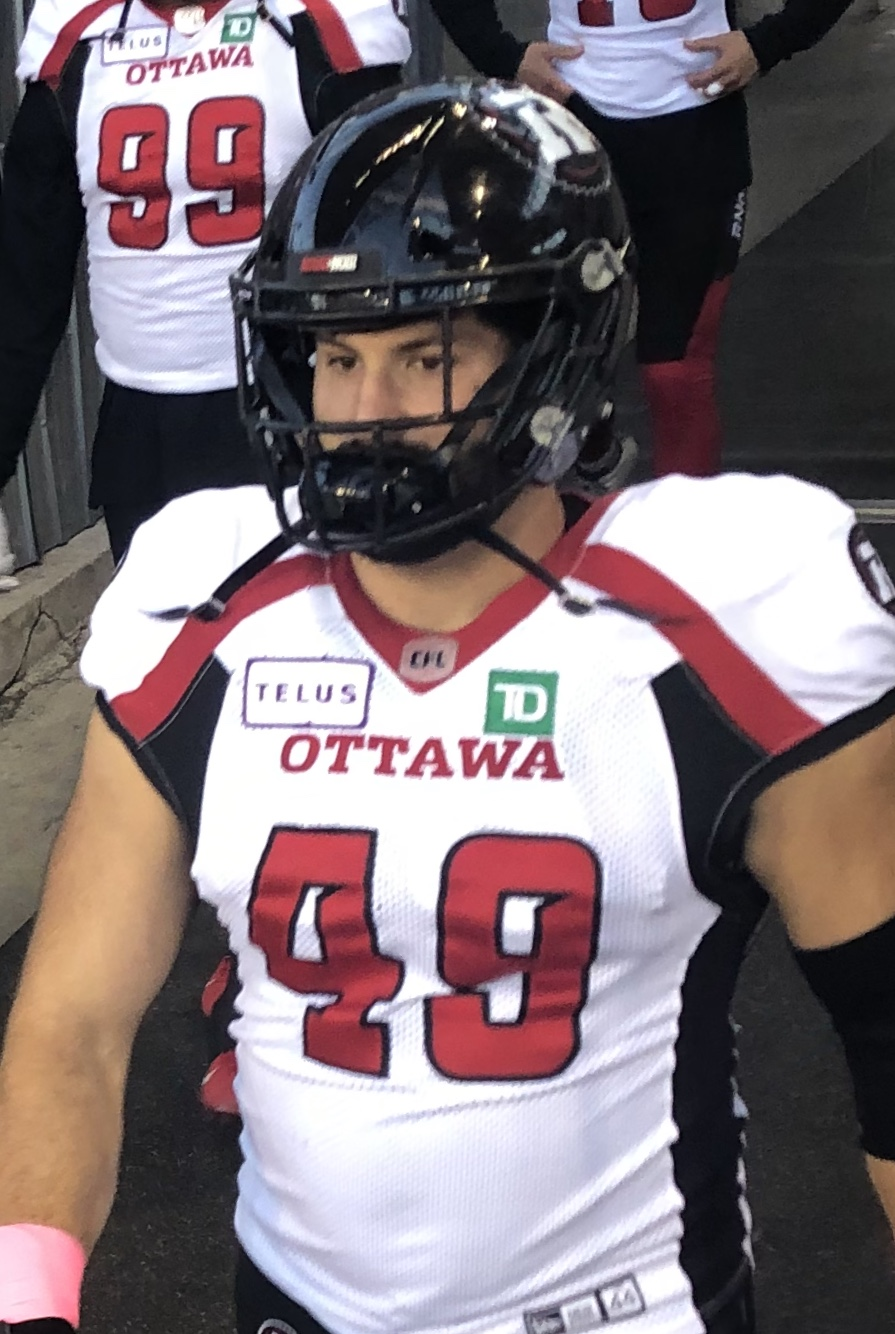
- Lattanzio with the Ottawa Redblacks in 2019

Profile
- Position: Defensive lineman

Personal information
- Born: December 27, 1990 (age 35); Ottawa, Ontario, Canada
- Listed height: 6 ft 0 in (1.83 m)
- Listed weight: 270 lb (122 kg)

Career information
- University: Ottawa
- CFL draft: 2015: 5th round, 38th overall pick

Career history
- 2015: Winnipeg Blue Bombers
- 2015–2020: Ottawa RedBlacks

Awards and highlights
- Grey Cup champion (2016); J. P. Metras Trophy (2015); First-team All-Canadian (2014)
- Stats at CFL.ca

Ettore Lattanzio (born December 27, 1990) is a Canadian former professional football defensive lineman who played in five seasons in the Canadian Football League (CFL), primarily for the Ottawa Redblacks. He is a Grey Cup champion after winning with the Redblacks in 2016.

== University career ==
Lattanzio played CIS football with the Ottawa Gee-Gees from 2011 to 2014. In his final year, he was named a 2014 First Team All-Canadian and was awarded the J. P. Metras Trophy as the country's best lineman.

== Professional career ==
=== Winnipeg Blue Bombers ===
Lattanzio was originally selected 38th overall by the Winnipeg Blue Bombers in the 2015 CFL draft and signed with the team on May 21, 2015. He was converted to fullback and began the season on the practice roster, but was released after the first game on June 29, 2015.

=== Ottawa Redblacks ===
Shortly after his release from Winnipeg, Lattanzio was signed by his hometown Ottawa Redblacks to a practice roster agreement on July 7, 2015. After two weeks, he made his professional debut in a regular season game on July 24, 2015 in an overtime win against the Calgary Stampeders. He played in nine games for the Redblacks in 2015 where he recorded two defensive tackles, one sack, and one forced fumble.

In 2016, Lattanzio played in 17 regular season games as a regular rotational player while sitting out the last game of the regular season. He had 24 defensive tackles, five sacks, and one forced fumble in the best year of his career. He also played in the first post-season game of his career in the East Final win over the Edmonton Eskimos. While he finished the year on the injured list, he won his first Grey Cup as a member of the Redblacks 104th Grey Cup championship team.

Lattanzio's 2017 season saw some regression as he again played in 17 regular season games, but had 16 defensive tackles and no sacks. In 2018, he spent most of the year on the injured list and played in the final three games of the season, including his first professional start on November 2, 2018 against the Toronto Argonauts. He also played in both post-season games and played in his first Grey Cup game which would ultimately be a loss to the Calgary Stampeders in the 106th Grey Cup.

In the 2019 season, Lattanzio returned to form as he played in 17 regular season games, recording 25 defensive tackles and two sacks. However, the Redblacks finished with a 3-15 record and failed to qualify for the playoffs for the first time since Lattanzio had joined the team.

Lattanzio signed a one-year contract extension with the Redblacks on February 15, 2020. However, the 2020 CFL season was cancelled and he did not play in 2020. After taking a pay cut in 2020 and facing another salary reduction to stay with the Redblacks in 2021, Lattanzio announced his retirement on February 12, 2020.

== Personal life ==
Lattanzio and his wife, Julie, have a son, Rosario, who was born in April 2020. Lattanzio works as a real estate agent at umber realty in Ottawa.
