= 43rd Vanier Cup =

2007 Canadian university football championship

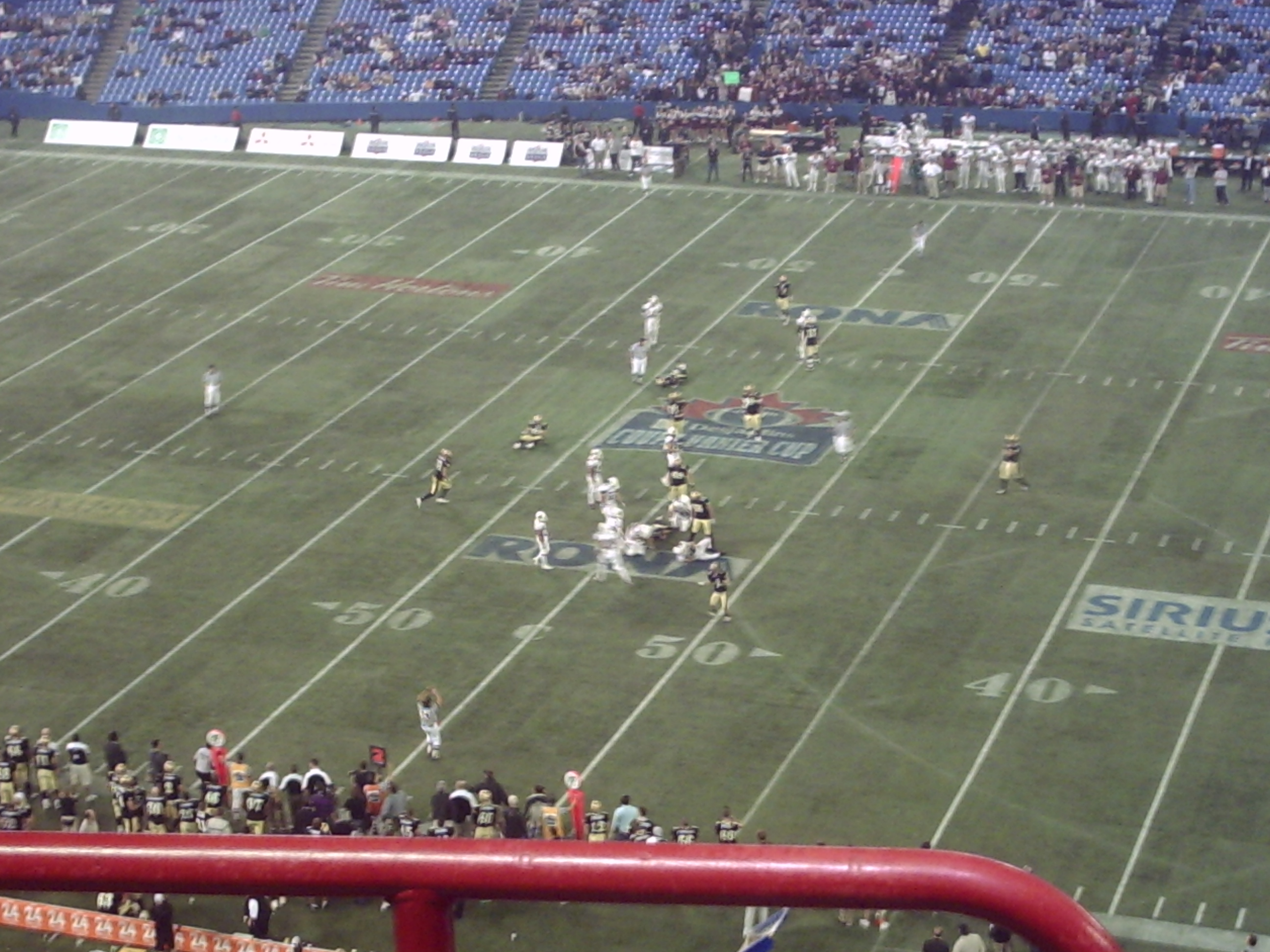
Saint Mary's Huskies	Manitoba Bisons
(7–1)	(8–0)
14	28
Head coach: Steve Sumarah	Head coach: Brian Dobie
	1	2	3	4	Total
Saint Mary's Huskies	7	1	0	6	14
Manitoba Bisons	6	7	10	5	28
- Date: November 23, 2007
- Stadium: Rogers Centre
- Location: Toronto
- Ted Morris Memorial Trophy: Mike Howard, Manitoba CB
- Bruce Coulter Award: John Makie, Manitoba QB
- Attendance: 26,787

Broadcasters
- Network: The Score/The Score HD

The 43rd Vanier Cup was played on November 23, 2007, at Rogers Centre in Toronto, Ontario, and decided the CIS Football champion for the 2007 season. The Manitoba Bisons completed a perfect season by defeating the Saint Mary's Huskies by a score of 28-14, finishing with a 12-0 record. The Huskies were without Hec Crighton Trophy winner Erik Glavic, who injured his knee a week earlier in the Uteck Bowl.

== Game summary ==
Saint Mary's Huskies (14) - TDs, Fraser O'Neill, Shawn White; singles, Justin Palardy (1); cons., Justin Palardy (1).

Manitoba Bisons (28) - TDs, Steve Gronick, John Makie; FGs Scott Dixon (4); cons., Scott Dixon (2); safety touch (1).

=== Scoring summary ===
First Quarter
SMU - TD O'Neill 13 pass from Abraham (Palardy convert) (5:22)
MAN - FG Dixon 40 (11:50)
MAN - FG Dixon 27 (15:00)

Second Quarter
MAN - TD Gronick 39 pass from Makie (Dixon convert) (6:04)
SMU - Single Palardy missed 30 yard field goal attempt (9:35)

Third Quarter
MAN - TD Makie 6 rush (Dixon kick) (4:41)
MAN - FG Dixon 32 (11:59)

Fourth Quarter
MAN - FG Dixon 33 (00:54)
SMU - TD White 8 pass from Abraham (Two-point convert failed) (3:35)
MAN - Team Safety (10:26)

=== Notable game facts ===
- The Manitoba Bisons became the 11th team in CIS history to claim the Vanier Cup after an undefeated season.
- The Vanier Cup and the Grey Cup were played two days apart in the same stadium, with both games featuring teams from Winnipeg.
- This was the seventh consecutive Vanier Cup game that featured a team nicknamed "Huskies."
- Manitoba CB Mike Howard had three interceptions and won the Ted Morris Memorial Trophy as game defensive MVP award.
- Manitoba QB John Makie finished the game passing 16-of-31 for 261 yards, one touchdown and no interceptions, and also scored on a six-yard touchdown run, and was awarded the Bruce Coulter Trophy as game offensive MVP award.
- Manitoba RB Matt Henry suffered a grotesque leg injury in the first quarter. It was later diagnosed as a broken femur.
