= Paul Paddon =

Canadian football player

Paul Paddon, quarterback for the University of Ottawa Gee Gee's, led them to the Vanier Cup final.

He was awarded the 1970 Hec Crighton Trophy for the most outstanding player in the nation, it was the University of Ottawa Gee Gee's first ever.

He was drafted by the Winnipeg Blue Bombers in 1971 (Round 6, #46).

In 1999 he was inducted into the Belleville Sports Hall of Fame.

He was in the first induction of the Lisgar Collegiate Institute Athletic Wall of Fame, as part of the 160th Anniversary celebrations.

Wife Valerie and children Jamie and Kelly. Kelly Paddon was a regular defenceman with the 1998-99 OHL Belleville Bulls J. Ross Robertson Cup champions.
