= 6th Vanier Cup =

1970 Canadian university football championship

Manitoba Bisons	Ottawa Gee-Gees
(6–2)	(N/A)
38	11
Head coach: Henry Janzen	Head coach: Bob O'Billovich
	1	2	3	4	Total
Manitoba Bisons	0	0	0	38	38
Ottawa Gee-Gees	0	0	0	11	11
- Date: November 21, 1970
- Stadium: Varsity Stadium
- Location: Toronto
- Ted Morris Memorial Trophy: Mike Shylo, Manitoba
- Attendance: 10,550

The 6th Vanier Cup was played on November 21, 1970, at Varsity Stadium in Toronto, Ontario, and decided the CIAU football champion for the 1970 season. The Manitoba Bisons became the first team to repeat as national champions as they won their second championship by defeating the Ottawa Gee-Gees by a score of 38-11.
