= Gee-Gees Field =

Stadium at the University of Ottawa

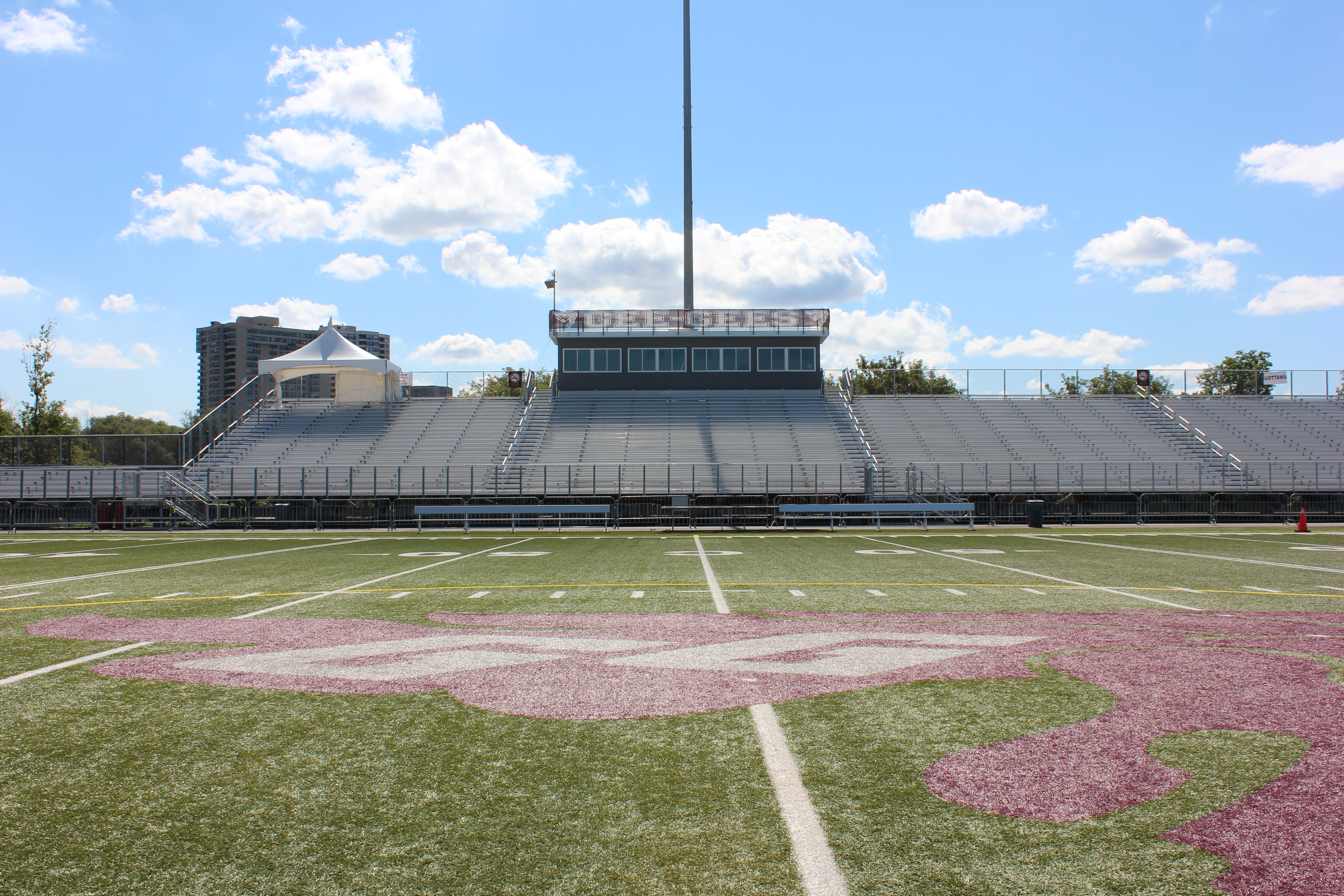
- View of the stadium in 2014
- Interactive map of Gee-Gees Field
- Address: 200 Lees Avenue; Ottawa, Ontario; Canada
- Coordinates: 45°24′57″N 75°39′56.4″W
- Owner: University of Ottawa
- Operator: uOttawa Athletics
- Capacity: 4,152 (2013-2021); 3,352 (2021-present)
- Type: Stadium
- Surface: FieldTurf
- Record attendance: 4,250 (October 5, 2013)
- Current use: Football

Construction
- Opened: September 7, 2013; 13 years ago
- Cost: $8 million

Tenants
- Ottawa Gee-Gees football (U Sports) (2013–present)

Website
- geegees.ca//geesfield

Gee-Gees Field is a Canadian football stadium at the University of Ottawa in Ottawa, Ontario, Canada. It was opened in 2013, to serve as the first on-campus home to the football team in 120 years.

Along with the stadium came all new facilities for the team at the Lees section of campus. This included new team rooms, coaches’ offices, dedicated athletic therapy and video rooms. The field is also fitted with a dome for use during the winter months, which provides opportunities to be utilized by the schools varsity teams, intramural sports, and other public clubs or community organizations.

In October 2013, Gee-Gees Field hosted the iconic Panda Game. In November 2018, the site was the host venue for the U Sports Women's Soccer National Championship.
