= Panda Game =

Canadian rivalry football game

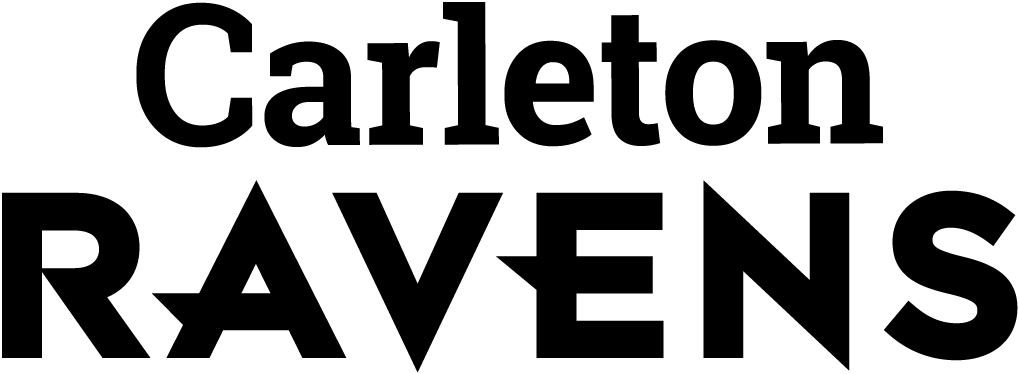
- Ottawa Gee-Gees Carleton Ravens
- Sport: Canadian football
- First meeting: 1955; 71 years ago Carleton 14, Ottawa 6
- Latest meeting: October 4, 2026; Ottawa 35, Carleton 32
- Next meeting: 2027
- Stadiums: TD Place Stadium, Lansdowne Park (Note: TD Place Stadium is the official name of the stadium pursuant to a naming rights agreement between the Toronto Dominion Bank and Ottawa Sports and Entertainment Group, which owns the teams that use the facility on a full-time basis. The surrounding district is still officially known as Lansdowne Park, the name once commonly used for the stadium itself. Because the participating universities are not beneficiaries of the naming rights agreement with the aforementioned bank, many sources prefer to use the name Lansdowne Park when referring to the venue for the Panda Game.) (1955–1996, 2014–present)
- Trophy: Pedro the Panda (3rd Version)

Statistics
- Total meetings: 56
- All-time series: Ottawa leads, 38–18
- Largest victory: Ottawa, 44–0 (1957)
- Longest win streak: Ottawa, 7 (1957–1963)
- Current win streak: University of Ottawa, 1 (2026–present)
- Locations of both universities in Ottawa

The Panda Game (French: Match Panda) is an annual Canadian football game between the two OUA football teams in Ottawa, Ontario: the University of Ottawa Gee-Gees and Carleton University Ravens. It is the most significant rivalry in Canadian university football and for many years has been the highest attended event in all of U Sports, and often is the best attended sporting event in Ottawa each year (surpassing all professional and amateur events in the city). Its name is derived from Pedro the Panda, the trophy presented to the winner each year. The game is part of the regular East division season, but is celebrated profusely due to its colourful history. The week preceding the game is sometimes referred to as "Panda Week". The University of Ottawa is located in the downtown Sandy Hill neighbourhood of the city, while Carleton is between Old Ottawa South and Dow's Lake.

== Creation and further history ==
In the fall of 1955, Thomas White and Bryan McNulty, two University of Ottawa students, decided to create a rivalry between their school and Carleton University. As sports editor of the U of O newspaper, Tom White suggested that they asked a prominent local jeweller, Jack Snow, to donate a stuffed panda that would be named "Pedro" to be used as a Gee-Gee mascot (as they had not adopted the Gee-Gee horse mascot yet). Mr. Snow had earlier been a team sponsor and was agreeable that the panda be "stolen" from his store and that Carleton students would be blamed for the theft. It was also understood that the police would be advised of the hoax beforehand. McNulty and White convinced Snow to display the panda in his front window and then organized the first "Pandanapping". The afternoon prior to the game, White drove McNulty and two other U of O students to the store and, claiming to be Carleton students, nabbed Pedro the Panda and took off. That evening, while watching the news on the local CBC station, Tom White's parents thought that the theft reflected badly on the Carleton student body, not knowing the panda was in an upstairs bedroom cupboard in their own home. Two Carleton students, roomers in an adjacent apartment, were also unaware. The following day, White and McNulty made their way to the north stands of Landsdown Park waiting for their moment. Just prior to the end of the game, Pedro the Panda was parachuted onto the playing field. The Panda Game rivalry - and ritual of the theft of Pedro being stolen from each campus in various ways - lasted more than four decades. "Pandanapping" would progress over the years to the point where major vandalism was involved and almost jeopardized the game's future.

Both Pedro and the Panda Game itself became national icons and feted across the country. In 1958, after a 25–0 Gee-Gee victory, Pedro went on a world tour. He made visits to McGill University in Montréal, Dalhousie University in Halifax, the University of Western Ontario in London, Ontario, the University of British Columbia in Vancouver, UCLA in Los Angeles, and Alabama State University in Montgomery. It is said that Pedro was even sent to Peru, Mexico and Europe.

The game quickly became the most well-known football game in Canada behind the Grey Cup and the Vanier Cup. The attendance at the Panda Game one year exceeded 16,000, which was higher than that of the Vanier Cup that same season. The resumption of the Panda Bowl took place in October, 2013 when Thomas White, assisted by representative players from both university teams in 1955, presented the winning game trophy to the victorious captain of the University of Ottawa team.

== 1987 tragedy ==
By the 1980s, the Panda Game had gained a reputation for being a drunken party more than a football game.

The 1987 game brought heavily packed stands. Dozens of fans leaned up against a railing, causing it to collapse. 30 Ravens fans fell roughly 16 feet onto concrete. Many students sustained broken bones and concussions, while one female student broke her neck and spent 20 days in a coma.

The future of the Panda Game was in doubt after the incident, but the tradition ultimately carried on. The 1988 game was heavily monitored by police and there was a general lack of enthusiasm about the event.

== Cancellation, eventual return ==
The aging stadium at Lansdowne Park fell into disrepair in the 1990s. The folding of the Ottawa Rough Riders in 1996 left the venue without a full-time tenant. As it was economically unfeasible to maintain the venue so as to safely host a single football game annually, the game was moved to Carleton's Keith Harris Stadium in 1997.

The resulting loss of revenue aggravated an already precarious financial situation for Carleton's football team. In 1998, Carleton University decided to cancel their football program at the end of the season after numerous years of sustained financial losses. This decision rendered the Panda Game tradition dead and left the Gee-Gees as the lone collegiate football team in the city for the first time in 53 years.

The late 2000s brought rumours that Carleton may once again look to field a football team sometime in the near future. Meanwhile, serious plans to rebuild and modernize the facilities at Lansdowne Park were put into place. After years of planning, in 2013, the Ravens once again took the field and would mark the return of the Panda Game tradition. 2013's Panda Game was a success with approximately 4,000 fans packing the brand-new Gee-Gees Field, the game resulted in the Gee-Gees winning the Pedro trophy with a score of 35–10.

== Return to Lansdowne Park ==
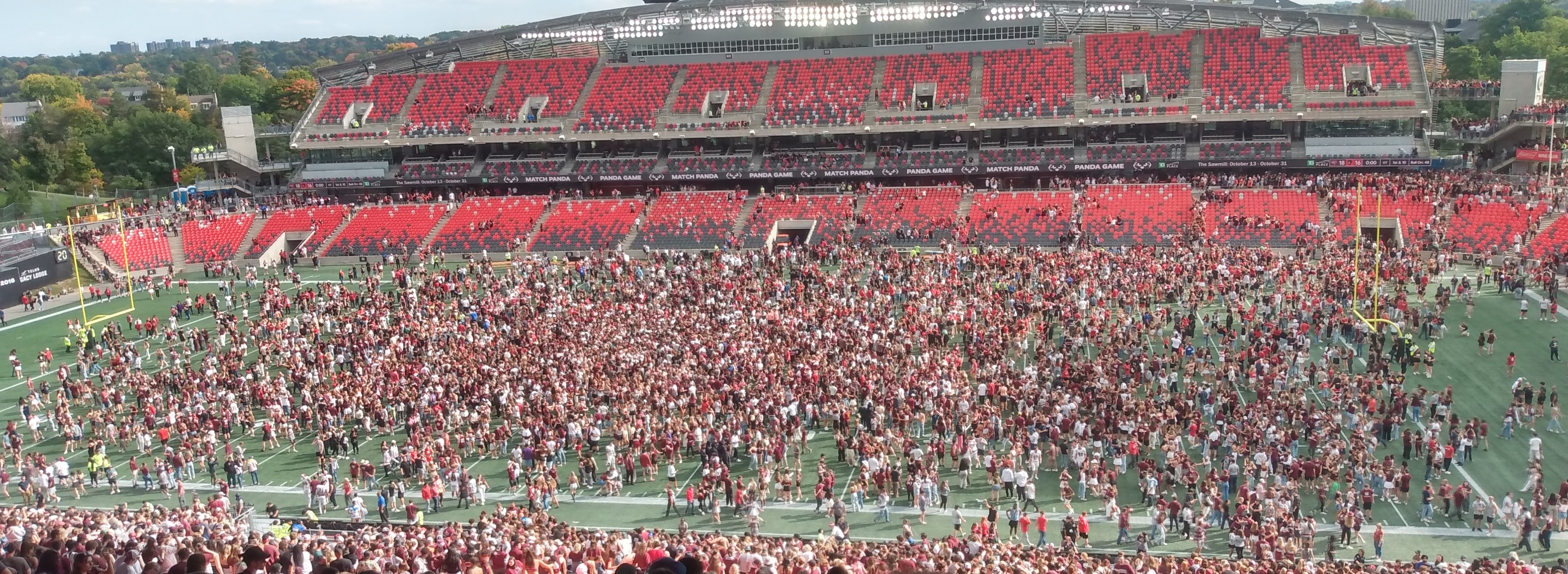
University of Ottawa students rush the field at TD Place following the walk off 55-yard field goal win by the Ottawa Gee-Gees at the 2023 Panda Game.

It was announced that the 2014 Panda Game was to be held at the newly renovated 24,000 seat TD Place Stadium, thus returning the game to its former home at Lansdowne Park.

The Panda Game in 2014 was another wildly successful venture, the use of the modernized facility saw the crowd grow to 12,000 as the Ravens came away with a last second Hail Mary catch to win the game 33–31. Fans immediately stormed the field, following the Touchdown. In Canadian Amateur football the convert is an optional play following a Touchdown. The Carleton Head Coach elected not to try the convert and end the game. In Amateur football there is no option for the defence to score points on a convert.

The 2015 edition saw a then-record attendance of 17,596. It was also the highest scoring Panda Game of all time with a combined score of 93 points, crushing the previous record of 77 points in 1975.

In 2016, the No. 7 ranked Gee-Gees came into the game undefeated (4–0) as they faced the No. 10 Ravens (3–2). Surpassing the previous season's record attendance mark, the 2016 Panda Game was a sellout as 23,329 fans watched Carleton defeat Ottawa 43–23. It was the most attended U Sports football regular season football game in at least two decades.

The 2020 Panda Game was cancelled due to the COVID-19 pandemic. Following the 2021 Panda Game, there were serious disturbances in Sandy Hill, resulting in several arrests and criminal charges. For the 2022 edition of the game, police increased their presence in the affected neighbourhood while officials threatened to cancel future Panda Games if such disturbances were repeated. There were disturbances in Sandy Hill after the 2022 game, leading to seven arrests. In 2023, the game was moved to a Sunday. The University of Ottawa created successful student events on campus before and after the game, and worked with community organizations, the city and the Ottawa Police, greatly reducing any disruptions before or after the game.

== Game results ==
Year	Site	Winning team	Score	Losing team	Score	Series tally	Notes
1955	Lansdowne Park	Carleton	14	Ottawa	6	CAR 1–0	First official Panda Game
1956	Lansdowne Park	Carleton	14	Ottawa	10	CAR 2–0	
1957	Lansdowne Park	Ottawa	44	Carleton	0	CAR 2–1	Biggest blowout in Panda Game history
1958	Lansdowne Park	Ottawa	23	Carleton	0	TIE 2–2	Attendance: 2,500
1959	Lansdowne Park	Ottawa	42	Carleton	0	OTT 3–2	
1960	Lansdowne Park	Ottawa	28	Carleton	6	OTT 4–2	
1961	Lansdowne Park	Ottawa	13	Carleton	12	OTT 5–2	
1962	Lansdowne Park	Ottawa	13	Carleton	10	OTT 6–2	
1963	Lansdowne Park	Ottawa	41	Carleton	21	OTT 7–2	
1964	Lansdowne Park	Carleton	40	Ottawa	33	OTT 7–3	Attendance: 3,000
1965	Lansdowne Park	Ottawa	27	Carleton	19	OTT 8–3	Attendance: 6,000
1966	Lansdowne Park	Ottawa	28	Carleton	13	OTT 9–3	
1967	Lansdowne Park	Ottawa	36	Carleton	20	OTT 10–3	Attendance: 6,500
1968	Lansdowne Park	Ottawa	28	Carleton	27	OTT 11–3	Carleton scores a touchdown as the clock ran out, but missed a two-point conversion attempt which would have won the game. Attendance: 6,200
1969	Lansdowne Park	Carleton	21	Ottawa	20	OTT 11–4	Attendance: 14,000
1970	Lansdowne Park	Ottawa	29	Carleton	20	OTT 12–4	Attendance: 11,000
1971	Lansdowne Park	Carleton	28	Ottawa	14	OTT 12–5	Attendance: 15,000
1972	Lansdowne Park	Ottawa	31	Carleton	14	OTT 13–5	Attendance: 10,000
1973	Lansdowne Park	Ottawa	21	Carleton	14	OTT 14–5	Attendance: 6,000
1974	Lansdowne Park	Ottawa	48	Carleton	7	OTT 15–5	Attendance: 13,500
1975	Lansdowne Park	Ottawa	55	Carleton	22	OTT 16–5	Gee-Gees go on to win National Championship; Attendance: 15,598
1976	Lansdowne Park	Ottawa	19	Carleton	14	OTT 17–5	Attendance: 13,000
1977	Lansdowne Park	Carleton	36	Ottawa	16	OTT 17–6	Attendance: 12,000
1978	Lansdowne Park	Carleton	24	Ottawa	13	OTT 17–7	Attendance: 15,000
1979	Lansdowne Park	Ottawa	28	Carleton	16	OTT 18–7	1st Pedro retires Attendance: 14,000
1980	Lansdowne Park	Carleton	30	Ottawa	21	OTT 18–8	Attendance: 15,000
1981	Lansdowne Park	Ottawa	29	Carleton	0	OTT 19–8	Attendance: 10,000
1982	Lansdowne Park	Ottawa	19	Carleton	7	OTT 20–8	Attendance: 8,000
1983	Lansdowne Park	Carleton	28	Ottawa	23	OTT 20–9	
1984	Lansdowne Park	Carleton	30	Ottawa	18	OTT 20–10	
1985	Lansdowne Park	Carleton	34	Ottawa	27	OTT 20–11	
1986	Lansdowne Park	Ottawa	30	Carleton	29	OTT 21–11	
1987	Lansdowne Park	Carleton	8	Ottawa	4	OTT 21–12	See "1987 Tragedy"
1988	Lansdowne Park	Ottawa	29	Carleton	9	OTT 22–12	
1989	Lansdowne Park	Ottawa	23	Carleton	11	OTT 23–12	
1990	Lansdowne Park	Ottawa	30	Carleton	17	OTT 24–12	
1991	Lansdowne Park	Ottawa	34	Carleton	15	OTT 25–12	
1992	Lansdowne Park	Ottawa	17	Carleton	6	OTT 26–12	
1993	Lansdowne Park	Ottawa	21	Carleton	3	OTT 27–12	
1994	Lansdowne Park	Carleton	27	Ottawa	15	OTT 27–13	
1995	Lansdowne Park	Ottawa	35	Carleton	8	OTT 28–13	
1996	Lansdowne Park	Ottawa	28	Carleton	0	OTT 29–13	
1997	Keith Harris Stadium	Ottawa	22	Carleton	19	OTT 30–13	
1998	Keith Harris Stadium	Ottawa	59	Carleton	17	OTT 31–13	Ravens team cancelled following season
2013	Gee-Gees Field	Ottawa	35	Carleton	10	OTT 32–13	Return of Panda Game
2014	TD Place Stadium	Carleton	33	Ottawa	31	OTT 32–14	Last second Hail Mary catch
2015	TD Place Stadium	Carleton	48	Ottawa	45	OTT 32–15	Overtime victory, highest scoring game in Panda history
2016	TD Place Stadium	Carleton	43	Ottawa	23	OTT 32–16	Sellout crowd (23,329)
2017	TD Place Stadium	Carleton	33	Ottawa	30	OTT 32–17	Overtime victory, Sellout crowd (24,420)
2018	TD Place Stadium	Ottawa	38	Carleton	27	OTT 33–17	50th Panda Game
2019	TD Place Stadium	Ottawa	32	Carleton	10	OTT 34–17	Attendance record (24,600)
2021	TD Place Stadium	Ottawa	19	Carleton	17	OTT 35–17	
2022	TD Place Stadium	Ottawa	37	Carleton	7	OTT 36–17	
2023	TD Place Stadium	Ottawa	18	Carleton	16	OTT 37–17	Ottawa scores a walk-off 55-yard field goal to win. Attendance: 23,467
2024	TD Place Stadium	Ottawa	35	Carleton	32	OTT 38–17	Attendance: 23,499
2025	TD Place Stadium	Carleton	20	Ottawa	14	OTT 38–18	Sell out - 24,372
2026	TD Place Stadium	Ottawa	35	Carleton	32	OTT 39-18	

== See also ==
- Capital Hoops Classic
