= Jamie Barresi =

Canadian football coach

- Barresi with the McMaster Marauders in 2026

McMaster Marauders
- Title: Quarterbacks coach

Personal information
- Born: Hamilton, Ontario, Canada

Career information
- Position: Quarterback
- University: Ottawa

Career history
- 1981–1983: Ottawa Gee-Gees (Asst. coach)
- 1984–1985: Penn State Nittany Lions (Grad Assistant)
- 1986–1987: Florida Gators (RC)
- 1988–1992: Penn State Nittany Lions (RC)
- 1993–2000: Wake Forest Demon Deacons (RC/QC)
- 2001–2003: UCF Knights (QC)
- 2004–2005: Hamilton Tiger-Cats (OC)
- 2006: BC Lions (RBC)
- 2007: BC Lions (RC)
- 2008: Saskatchewan Roughriders (RBC)
- 2009: Saskatchewan Roughriders (QC)
- 2010–2011: Winnipeg Blue Bombers (OC)
- 2012: Edmonton Eskimos (Run game coordinator)
- 2013–2019: Ottawa Gee-Gees (HC)
- 2021–present: McMaster Marauders (QC)

Awards and highlights
- 2006 Grey Cup champion

Jamie Barresi is a Canadian football coach who is the quarterbacks coach for the McMaster Marauders of U Sports football. He has formerly served as the head coach for the Ottawa Gee-Gees from 2013 to 2019 and has coached professionally in the Canadian Football League (CFL) for nine years including his role as running backs coach for the BC Lions in 2006 where he won a Grey Cup championship.

== University career ==
Barresi played CIAU football as a quarterback for the Gee-Gees from 1976 to 1979.

== Coaching career ==
After beginning his coaching career as an assistant coach for the Ottawa Gee-Gees, Barresi spent 20 years coaching in the NCAA Division I for various teams. He then coached professionally in the CFL for nine years including for the BC Lions in 2006 where he won a Grey Cup championship.

On January 15, 2013, it was announced that Barresi had been hired as the head coach of the University of Ottawa's football team, the Ottawa Gee-Gees. He coached the team for seven years with a 35-21 record. It was announced on March 20, 2020 that Barresi was leaving the program.

In 2021, Barresi joined the coaching staff as the quarterbacks coach for the McMaster Marauders.
