= 2013 Carleton Ravens football team =

College football season

2013 Carleton Ravens football
- Conference: Ontario University Athletics
- Record: 0–8 (0–8 OUA)
- Head coach: Steve Sumarah
- Offensive coordinator: Jean-Philippe Asselin
- Defensive coordinator: Ryan Bechmanis
- Home stadium: Keith Harris Stadium

Uniform

After a 15-year hiatus, the Carleton University Ravens Canadian football team returned to Canadian Interuniversity Sport play, as part of the 2013 CIS football season. The season began on Labour Day (Sept 2) with a 71–4 loss to the Western Mustangs. The season wrapped up on October 19 when McMaster Marauders defeated Carleton 45–3 at home at Keith Harris Stadium in Ottawa. The team was winless in their 8 games and was outscored 95-390. The team finished last, in 11th place in the OUA conference.

== Roster ==
#	Player	Position
2	Tunde Adeleke	DB
25	Bamki Adewale	DB
99	Emmanuel Adusei	DL
91	Zach Annen *(c)	DL
55	Kwabena Asare	OL
18	Andrew Banerjee	K
34	Matt Barkovich	RB
10	Christian Battistelli	RB
83	Dechuan Beals	WR
11	Nathaniel Behar *(c)	WR
30	Jahvari Bennett	RB
13	Wilson Birch	WR
7	Lucas Brenton	DB
56	Derek Brown	OL
8	Dexter Brown	WR
49	Shane Brownlee	LB
89	Tyler Callahan	WR
98	Josh Cardillo	DL
88	Malcolm Carter	WR
97	Stefan Carty	DL
44	Leon Cenerini *(c)	LB
14	Tanaka Chakwesha	DB
96	Austin Cornell Watson	DL
4	Michael Domagala	K
42	Erik Dominey	LB
5	Andrew Ellis	WR
31	Tanner Emery	LB
19	Matt Engel	LS
58	Eric Fowler	OL
26	Jordon Gorgichuk	DB
1	Nick Gorgichuk	QB
9	Keith Graham	RB
73	Adam Graves	DL
62	Christopher Gulinski	OL
3	Kwasi Gyamfi-Adusei	RB
23	Nathaniel Hamlin	DB
93	Brady Hawkins *(c)	DL
59	Jason Hoddinott	OL
67	Lake Johnston	OL
64	Tommy Kanichis	OL
47	Thomas Knapp	DB
45	Will Kosiancic	DB
81	Eric Kys	WR
66	Matt Lapointe *(c)	OL
84	Joey Macdonald	WR
85	Lucas Mancini	WR
60	Jason McGinn	OL
51	Spencer McIntosh	LB
29	Daniel McNicoll	DB
6	Jesse Mills	QB
20	Phoenix Molen	LB
32	Stefano Napolitano *(c)	RB
52	Elliott Nelson	LB
90	Liam Noakes	DL
77	Dem Ogunyinka	DL
22	Marley Patterson	RB
40	Connor Picco	LB
61	Alexandros Reklitis	OL
24	Nick Rhodenizer	DB
65	Dylan Shervill	DL
82	Jarret St. John	WR
15	Jeremy Sterling	DB
86	Cameron Stewart	WR
33	D'Sean Thelwell	DB
36	A. J. Thompson	DB
69	Bobby Thomson	OL
35	Travis Troughton	RB
12	Kyle Van Wynsberghe	WR
46	Graeme Ward	LB
63	Tyler Young	OL

- (c) - Team Captains

== Regular season ==
The Ravens play an 8-game schedule, playing all but two OUA football teams, the Laurier Golden Hawks and the Queen's Golden Gaels.

#	Date	Visitor	Score	Home	Record	Site	Attendance	Box Score
1	September 2	Carleton Ravens	4-71	Western Mustangs	0-1	TD Waterhouse Stadium, London	10,377	
2	September 7	Waterloo Warriors	47-8	Carleton Ravens	0-2	Keith Harris Stadium, Ottawa	4,500	
3	September 14	Carleton Ravens	14-44	Windsor Lancers	0-3	University of Windsor Stadium, Windsor	928	
4	September 21	York Lions	50-34	Carleton Ravens	0-4	Keith Harris Stadium, Ottawa	3,500	
5	September 27	Carleton Ravens	10-50	Toronto Varsity Blues	0-5	Varsity Stadium, Toronto	1,932	
6	October 5	Carleton Ravens	10-35	Ottawa Gee Gees	0-6	Gee Gees Stadium, Ottawa	3,500	
7	October 11	Guelph Gryphons	48-12	Carleton Ravens	0-7	Keith Harris Stadium, Ottawa	3,800	
8	October 19	McMaster Marauders	3-45	Carleton Ravens	0-8	Keith Harris Stadium, Ottawa	2,500	

== Game summaries ==
=== Vs. Western ===
Carleton @ Western

Team	1	2	3	4	Total
Ravens	1	0	0	3	4
• Mustangs	14	32	15	10	71

- Date: September 2
- Location: TD Waterhouse Stadium, London
- Game start: 7:00 PM EDT
- Game attendance: 10,377
- Game weather: 16°C, Wind: NW 15 km/h

=== Vs. Waterloo ===
Waterloo @ Carleton

Team	1	2	3	4	Total
• Warriors	4	13	7	23	47
Ravens	0	0	8	0	8

- Date: September 7
- Location: Keith Harris Stadium, Ottawa
- Game start: 1:00 PM EDT
- Game attendance: 4,500
- Game weather: 19°C, Wind: 20 km/h
- Referee: Bill Szigetti
- Television network: Rogers 22

=== Vs. Windsor ===
Carleton @ Windsor

Team	1	2	3	4	Total
Ravens	0	0	7	7	14
• Lancers	10	14	17	3	44

- Date: September 14
- Location: University of Windsor Stadium (Alumni Field), Windsor
- Game start: 1:00 PM EDT
- Game attendance: 928
- Game weather: 16°C, Wind: 9 km/h WSW

=== Vs. York ===
York @ Carleton

Team	1	2	3	4	Total
• Lions	21	2	24	3	50
Ravens	0	10	7	17	34

- Date: September 21
- Location: Keith Harris Stadium, Ottawa
- Game start: 1:00 PM EDT
- Game attendance: 3500
- Game weather: 17°C, Wind: 11 km/h, Rainy
- Referee: Pierre Laporte
- Television network: Rogers 22

=== Vs. Toronto ===
Carleton @ Toronto

Team	1	2	3	4	Total
Ravens	0	3	7	0	10
• Varsity Blues	12	14	14	10	50

- Date: September 21
- Location: Varsity Stadium, Toronto
- Game start: 7:07 PM EDT
- Game attendance: 1,932
- Game weather: 20°C, Wind: 5 km/h, Clear
- Referee: R. Foxcroft

=== Vs. Ottawa ===
Carleton @ Ottawa

Team	1	2	3	4	Total
Ravens	0	10	0	0	10
• Gee Gees	14	7	14	0	35

- Date: October 5
- Location: Gee Gees Stadium, Ottawa
- Game start: 1:00 PM EDT
- Game attendance: 3,500
- Game weather: 17°C, Wind: W 11 km/h, Clear
- Referee: P. Laporte
- Television network: Sportsnet 360

The Panda Game returns for the first time since 1998.

=== Vs. Gryphons ===
Guelph @ Carleton

Team	1	2	3	4	Total
• Gryphons	10	14	7	17	48
Ravens	3	7	2	0	12

- Date: October 11
- Location: Keith Harris Stadium, Ottawa
- Game start: 7:00 PM EDT
- Game attendance: 3,800
- Game weather: 21°C, Wind: 0 km/h, Clear
- Referee: Pierre Laporte

=== Vs. McMaster ===
McMaster @ Carleton

Team	1	2	3	4	Total
• Marauders	17	14	7	7	45
Ravens	0	0	3	0	3

- Date: October 19
- Location: Keith Harris Stadium, Ottawa
- Game start: 1:07 PM EDT
- Game attendance: 2,500
- Game weather: 13°C, Wind: 9 km/h, Cloudy
- Referee: Barclay Easton
