= 2013 CIS football season =

- Duration: August 25, 2013 – October 26, 2013
- Hardy Cup champions: Calgary Dinos
- Yates Cup champions: Western Mustangs
- Dunsmore Cup champions: Laval Rouge et Or
- Loney Bowl champions: Mount Allison Mounties
- Mitchell Bowl champions: Calgary Dinos
- Uteck Bowl champions: Laval Rouge et Or

Vanier Cup
- Date: November 23, 2013
- Venue: Quebec City, Quebec
- Champions: Laval Rouge et Or

CIS football seasons seasons
- 2012 2014

The 2013 CIS football season began on August 25, 2013, with ten Ontario University Athletics teams playing that day. The season concluded on November 23 with the 49th Vanier Cup championship in Quebec City, won by the Laval Rouge et Or after they defeated the Calgary Dinos 25–14. This year, 27 university teams in Canada played Canadian Interuniversity Sport football, the highest level of amateur Canadian football. The Carleton Ravens football team re-joined the CIS after a 14-year absence, increasing the number of OUA teams to 11 and necessitating the use of bye weeks in that conference.

== Regular season standings ==
2013 Canada West standings
Team (Rank)	W		L	PTS	Playoff Spot
#3 Calgary	8	-	0	16	†
Manitoba	5	-	3	10	X
#7 Saskatchewan	5	-	3	10	X
UBC	4	-	4	8	X
Regina	2	-	6	4	
Alberta	0	-	8	0	
† – Conference Champion; Rankings: CIS Top 10

2013 RSEQ standings
	Overall				Conf			Playoff Spot
Team (Rank)	W		L	PTS	W		L	Playoff Spot
#2 Laval	8	-	0	16	7	-	0	†
#8 Bishop's	6	-	2	12	6	-	2	X
#6 Montreal	5	-	3	10	4	-	3	X
Sherbrooke	3	-	5	6	3	-	5	X
McGill	3	-	5	6	3	-	4	
Concordia	0	-	8	0	0	-	7	
† – Conference Champion; Rankings: CIS Top 10

2013 OUA standings
Team (Rank)	W		L	PTS	Playoff Spot
#1 Western	8	-	0	16	†
#4 Queen's	7	-	1	14	X
#5 Guelph	7	-	1	14	X
#8 McMaster	5	-	3	10	X
Ottawa	5	-	3	10	X
Windsor	4	-	4	8	X
Toronto	4	-	4	8	
York	2	-	6	4	
Waterloo	1	-	7	2	
Laurier	1	-	7	2	
Carleton	0	-	8	0	
† – Conference Champion; Rankings: CIS Top 10

2013 AUS standings
	Overall				Conf			Playoff Spot
Team (Rank)	W		L	PTS	W		L	Playoff Spot
Saint Mary's	5	-	3	10	3	-	1	
Mount Allison	4	-	4	8	2	-	2	
Acadia	3	-	5	6	2	-	2	
St. FX	3	-	5	6	1	-	3	
† – Conference Champion; Rankings: CIS Top 10

=== Top 10 ===
FRC-CIS top 10 rankings
Team \ Week	1	2	3	4	5	6	7	8	9	10
Acadia Axemen	11 (11)	11 (15)	17 (1)	NR	12 (5)	13 (4)	NR	NR	NR	NR
Alberta Golden Bears	NR	NR	NR	NR	NR	NR	NR	NR	NR	NR
Bishop's Gaiters	14 (2)	10 (25)	13 (7)	10 (21)	8 (69)	8 (89)	8 (97)	8 (87)	7 (110)	6 (128)
Calgary Dinos	3 (137)	5 (178)	5 (165)	5 (200)	5 (188)	3 (230)	3 (233)	3 (234)	3 (232)	3 (235)
Carleton Ravens	NR	NR	NR	NR	NR	NR	NR	NR	NR	NR
Concordia Stingers	NR	NR	NR	NR	NR	NR	NR	NR	NR	NR
Guelph Gryphons	7 (75)	7 (111)	7 (131)	6 (152)	6 (164)	4 (199)	4 (212)	4 (206)	5 (173)	5 (167)
Laurier Golden Hawks	NR	NR	NR	NR	NR	NR	NR	NR	NR	NR
Laval Rouge et Or	1 (200-20)	1 (300-30)	1 (299-29)	1 (290-21)	1 (290-21)	2 (283-13)	2 (280-10)	2 (280-10)	2 (279-10)	2 (278-10)
Manitoba Bisons	10 (36)	9 (91)	8 (76)	8 (99)	10 (35)	10 (44)	12 (8)	14 (3)	9 (52)	9 (66)
McGill Redmen	NR	NR	15 (3)	12 (6)	16 (1)	14 (1)	16 (1)	NR	NR	NR
McMaster Marauders	6 (122)	6 (134)	9 (58)	9 (61)	9 (47)	9 (56)	9 (53)	9 (67)	8 (87)	8 (103)
Montreal Carabins	5 (123)	3 (209)	4 (224)	4 (206)	4 (201)	7 (118)	6 (138)	6 (146)	6 (154)	7 (125)
Mount Allison Mounties	NR	NR	NR	NR	NR	NR	NR	NR	NR	NR
Ottawa Gee-Gees	NR	NR	11 (11)	NR	NR	NR	15 (5)	15 (2)	11 (9)	NR
Queen's Golden Gaels	2 (141)	2 (251)	2 (245)	3 (237)	3 (232)	5 (198)	5 (202)	5 (186)	4 (211)	4 (216)
Regina Rams	12 (9)	14 (1)	14 (3)	13 (4)	NR	NR	NR	NR	NR	NR
Saint Mary's Huskies	13 (2)	NR	10 (26)	14 (3)	NR	NR	13 (6)	11 (11)	14 (1)	11 (6)
Saskatchewan Huskies	9 (57)	8 (106)	6 (141)	7 (99)	7 (113)	6 (126)	7 (119)	7 (110)	10 (27)	10 (29)
Sherbrooke Vert et Or	8 (59)	12 (15)	12 (11)	NR	13 (4)	12 (15)	14 (5)	12 (6)	13 (4)	13 (1)
St. Francis Xavier X-Men	NR	NR	16 (3)	11 (16)	15 (2)	NR	NR	NR	NR	NR
Toronto Varsity Blues	NR	NR	NR	NR	NR	NR	NR	NR	NR	NR
UBC Thunderbirds	NR	15 (1)	NR	NR	14 (2)	NR	11 (9)	13 (5)	12 (9)	12 (3)
Waterloo Warriors	NR	NR	NR	NR	NR	NR	NR	NR	NR	NR
Western Mustangs	4 (129)	4 (203)	3 (241-1)	2 (267-9)	2 (275-9)	1 (287-17)	1 (290-20)	1 (290-20)	1 (290-20)	1 (290-20)
Windsor Lancers	15 (1)	13 (4)	18 (1)	15 (2)	11 (20)	11 (21)	10 (20)	10 (17)	NR	NR
York Lions	NR	NR	NR	NR	NR	NR	NR	NR	NR	NR

Ranks in italics are teams not ranked in the top 10 poll but received votes.
NR = Not ranked, received no votes.
Number in parentheses denotes number votes, after the dash number of first place votes.

== Championships ==
The 49th Vanier Cup is played between the champions of the Mitchell Bowl and the Uteck Bowl, the national semi-final games. In 2013, according to the rotating schedule, the Atlantic conference Loney Bowl champions will host the Dunsmore Cup Quebec championship team for the Uteck Bowl. The winners of the Canada West conference Hardy Trophy will host the Ontario conference's Yates Cup champion for the Mitchell Bowl.

== Post-season awards ==
CIS post-season awards
	Quebec	Ontario	Atlantic	Canada West	NATIONAL
Hec Crighton Trophy	Jordan Heather (Bishop's)	Will Finch (Western)	Jordan Botel (Mount Allison)	Mercer Timmis (Calgary)	Jordan Heather (Bishop's)
Presidents' Trophy	Antoine Pruneau (Montreal)	Pawel Kruba (Western)	Ron Omara (St. Francis Xavier)	Doctor Cassama (Calgary)	Pawel Kruba (Western)
J. P. Metras Trophy	Laurent Duvernay-Tardif (McGill)	Ettore Lattanzio (Ottawa)	Jesse St. James (Acadia)	Donovan Dale (British Columbia)	Laurent Duvernay-Tardif (McGill)
Peter Gorman Trophy	Alex Cromer-Émond (Montreal)	Daniel Vandervoort (McMaster)	Adam Melanson (Acadia)	Rashaun Simonise (Calgary)	Daniel Vandervoort (McMaster)
Russ Jackson Award	Laurent Duvernay-Tardif (McGill)	Aaron Gazendam (Queen's)	Stu Moore (Mount Allison)	Andrew Buckley (Calgary)	Andrew Buckley (Calgary)
Frank Tindall Trophy	Kevin Mackey (Bishop's)	Greg Marshall (Western)	Kelly Jeffrey (Mount Allison)	Blake Nill (Calgary)	Kevin Mackey (Bishop's)

=== All-Canadian team ===
==== First team ====
Offence
Jordan Heather, QB, Bishop's
Mercer Timmis, RB, Calgary
Anthony Coombs, RB, Manitoba
Alexander Fox, IR, Bishop's
Brian Marshall, IR, Western
George Johnson, WR, Western
Paul de Pass, WR, Toronto
Pierre Lavertu, C, Laval
Karl Lavoie, OT, Laval
Laurent Duvernay-Tardif, OT, McGill
Jas Dhillon, G, British Columbia
Charles Vaillancourt, G, Laval
Defence
Ettore Lattanzio, DT, Ottawa
Donovan Dale, DT, British Columbia
Derek Wiggan, DE, Queen's
Jesse St. James, DE, Acadia
Pawel Kruba, LB, Western
Doctor Cassama, LB, Calgary
Beau Landry, LB, Western
Kwame Adjei, FS, Mount Allison
Brett Backman, HB, Acadia
Cyril Iwanegbe, HB, Calgary
Andrew Lue, CB, Queen's
Maximilien Ducap, CB, Laval
Special teams
Quinn van Gylswyk, P, British Columbia
Johnny Mark, K, Calgary
Kevin Bradfield, RET, Toronto

==== Second team ====
Offence
Will Finch, QB, Western
Brendan Gillanders, RB, Ottawa
Jordan Botel, RB, Mount Allison
Nic Demski, IR, Manitoba
Evan Pszczonak, IR, Windsor
Taylor Renaud, WR, Acadia
Addison Richards, WR, Regina
Sean McEwen, C, Calgary
Josh Prinsen, OT, Queen's
Alec Pennell, OT, British Columbia
Sukh Chungh, G, Calgary
Cameron Thorn, G, Guelph
Defence
Brandon Tennant, DT, Laval
Daryl Waud, DT, Western
Joel Seutter, DE, Saskatchewan
Dylan Ainsworth, DE, Western
Ron Omara, LB, St. Francis Xavier
Sam Sabourin, LB, Queen's
Antoine Pruneau, LB, Montreal
Mark Ingram, FS, Saskatchewan
TJ Chase-Dunawa, HB, Queen's
Cameron Wade, HB, Acadia
Tevaughn Campbell, CB, Regina
Eric Black, CB, Saint Mary's
Special teams
Boris Bede, P, Laval
Lirim Hajrullahu, K, Western
Guillaume Rioux, RET, Laval

== Teams ==
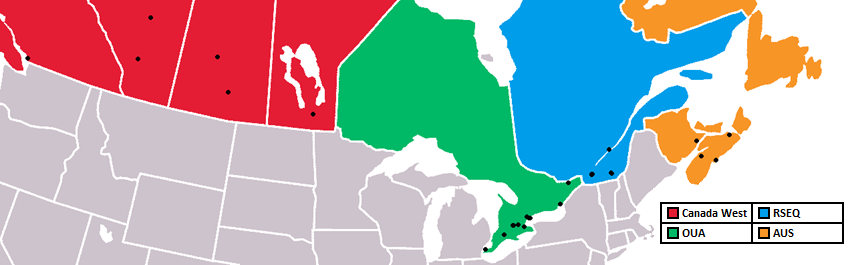

Canada West Football Conference Hardy Trophy
Institution	Team	City	Province	First season	Head coach	Enrollment	Endowment	Football stadium	Capacity
University of British Columbia	Thunderbirds	Vancouver	BC	1923	Shawn Olson	43,579	$1.01B	Thunderbird Stadium	3,500
University of Calgary	Dinos	Calgary	AB	1964	Blake Nill	28,196	$444M	McMahon Stadium	35,650
University of Alberta	Golden Bears	Edmonton	AB	1910	Chris Morris	36,435	$751M	Foote Field	3,500
University of Saskatchewan	Huskies	Saskatoon	SK	1912	Brian Towriss	19,082	$136.7M	Griffiths Stadium	6,171
University of Regina	Rams	Regina	SK	1999	Frank McCrystal	12,800	$25.9M	Mosaic Stadium at Taylor Field	32,848
University of Manitoba	Bisons	Winnipeg	MB	1920	Brian Dobie	27,599	$303M	Investors Group Field	33,422

Ontario University Athletics Yates Cup
Institution	Team	City	Province	First season	Head coach	Enrollment	Endowment	Football stadium	Capacity
University of Windsor	Lancers	Windsor	ON	1968	Joe D'Amore	13,496	$32.5M	South Campus Stadium	2,000
University of Western Ontario	Mustangs	London	ON	1929	Greg Marshall	30,000	$266.6M	TD Waterhouse Stadium	10,000
University of Waterloo	Warriors	Waterloo	ON	1957	Joe Paopao	27,978	$172M	Warrior Field	5,200
Wilfrid Laurier University	Golden Hawks	Waterloo	ON	1961	Michael Faulds	12,394	---	University Stadium	6,000
University of Guelph	Gryphons	Guelph	ON	1950	Stu Lang	19,408	$164.2M	Alumni Stadium	4,100
McMaster University	Marauders	Hamilton	ON	1901	Stefan Ptaszek	25,688	$498.5M	Ron Joyce Stadium	6,000
University of Toronto	Varsity Blues	Toronto	ON	1877	Greg Gary	73,185	$1.823B	Varsity Stadium	5,000
York University	Lions	Toronto	ON	1969	Warren Craney	42,400	$306M	York Stadium	2,500
Queen's University	Golden Gaels	Kingston	ON	1882	Pat Sheahan	20,566	$657M	Richardson Stadium	10,258
University of Ottawa	Gee-Gees	Ottawa	ON	1894	Jamie Barresi	35,548	$128.4M	New Gee-Gees Stadium	3,500
Carleton University	Ravens	Ottawa	ON	1945	Steve Sumarah	25,890	$230M	Keith Harris Stadium	3,000

Quebec University Football League Dunsmore Cup
Institution	Team	City	Province	First season	Head coach	Enrollment	Endowment	Football stadium	Capacity
Concordia University	Stingers	Montreal	QC	1974	Gerry McGrath	38,809	$54.4M	Concordia Stadium	4,000
Université de Montréal	Carabins	Montreal	QC	2002	Danny Maciocia	55,540	$89.5M	CEPSUM Stadium	5,100
McGill University	Redmen	Montreal	QC	1898	Clint Uttley	32,514	$973.6M	Molson Stadium	25,012
Université Laval	Rouge et Or	Quebec City	QC	1996	Glen Constantin	37,591	$105.3M	PEPS Stadium	12,257
Université de Sherbrooke	Vert et Or	Sherbrooke	QC	1971	David Lessard	35,000	---	Université de Sherbrooke Stadium	3,359
Bishop's University	Gaiters	Sherbrooke	QC	1884	Kevin Mackey	1,817	---	Coulter Field	2,200

Atlantic University Football Conference Jewett Trophy
Institution	Team	City	Province	First season	Head coach	Enrollment	Endowment	Football stadium	Capacity
Acadia University	Axemen	Wolfville	NS	1957	Jeff Cummins	3,770	$40M	Raymond Field	3,000
Mount Allison University	Mounties	Sackville	NB	1955	Kelly Jeffrey	2,614	$82.8M	MacAulay Field	2,500
Saint Francis Xavier University	X-Men	Antigonish	NS	1954	Gary Waterman	4,871	$59.4M	Oland Stadium	4,000
Saint Mary's University	Huskies	Halifax	NS	1956	Perry Marchese	7,433	$16.9M	Huskies Stadium	4,000
