= 2016 Carleton Ravens football team =

College football season

2016 Carleton Ravens football
- Conference: Ontario University Athletics
- Record: 7–3 (7–3 OUA)
- Head coach: Steve Sumarah
- Home stadium: MNP Park

The 2016 Carleton Ravens football team represented Carleton University in the 2016 CIS football season. The Ravens played in their 55th season overall and their fourth season of Canadian Interuniversity Sport play after a 15-year hiatus.

Carleton had a fairly successful season, finishing the regular season with a 6–2 record, 4th in the OUA. This gave the Ravens the right to host their first playoff game since 1986, against their cross-town rivals, the Ottawa Gee-Gees. They would then go on to lose in the semifinal against Western. The Ravens finished the season ranked 8th in the country, and had a peak ranking of 4th after week 3.

== Roster ==
#	Player	Position
	Josh Walsh	LB
1	Jayde Rowe	RB
2	Tunde Adeleke	DB
3	Jesse St. John	QB
4	Michael Domagala	K
5	Andrew Ellis	RB
6	Jesse Mills	QB
7	Jay Dearborn	DB
8	Dexter Brown	WR
9	Keith Graham	DB
10	Christian Battistelli	RB
11	Nate Behar	WR
12	Kyle Vanwynsberghe	WR
13	Wilson Birch	WR
14	Mackenzie Johnson	DB
15	Giordy Belfiore	QB
16	Justin Howell	DB
17	Tanner Dejong	QB
18	Jonah Zlatinszky	
19	Jevante Stanley	RB
20	Smith Leandre	LB
21	Josh Earle	DB
22	Marley Patterson	RB
23	Nathaniel Hamlin	DB
24	Nick Rhodenizer	DB
25	Bamaki Adewale	LB
26	Guillaume Caron	DB
27	Ricardo Barrett	DB
28	James McCallum	DB
29	Daniel McNicoll	DB
30	Jahvari Bennett	RB
31	Nathan Carter	RB
32	Stefano Napolitano	FB
33	Dsean Thelwell	DB
34	Andrew Pocrnic	RB
35	Matt Pickens	RB
36	A. J. Thompson	DB
38	Kurtis Burton-Rowe	RB
39	Mitch Raper	RB
40	Jamahll Charles	DE
41	Ryan Kublek	LS
42	Mark Kudu	LB
43	Vincent Viau-Duval	LB
44	Leon Cenerini	LB
45	Emilio Gallotta	LB
47	Thomas Knapp	DB
49	Mack Holliday	DL
51	Justin Veltri	LB
52	Elliott Nelson	LB
53	Josh Lambersky	OL
54	Carlo Gallotta	LB
55	Kwabena Arasare	OL
56	Jack Cassar	IL
57	Jesse Lawson	OL
58	Eric Fowler	OL
59	Kendal Reeder	OL
61	Zach Annen	C
62	K. C. Bakker	OL
63	Tyler Young	OL
64	Tommy Kanichis	OL
65	Elijah Watson	OL
66	Bill Aziz	DL
67	Lake Johnston	OL
68	Nolan McGreer	OL
69	Bobby Thompson	OL
70	Andrew McCourt	OL
77	Dem Ogunyinka	DL
80	Simon Beeksma	WR
81	Theshawn Barry	WR
83	Clark Adams	WR
84	Ti-Amo Richards	WR
85	Phil Iloki	WR
86	Quinton Soares	WR
87	Chad Manchulenko	WR
88	Nigel Goodridge	WR
89	Tyler Callahan	WR
90	Jenya Petrusenko	WR
91	George Saloum	DL
92	Frederik Robitaille	DL
93	Jeremy Rioux	DL
94	Josh Scott	DL
95	Daniel Omara	DL
96	Kene Onyeka	DL
97	Tevin Bowen	DL
98	Stefan Carty	DL
99	Jessy Kocins	DL
100	Emmanuel Adusei	DT

== Exhibition ==
#	Date	Visitor	Score	Home	Record	Site	Attendance	Box Score
1	August 20	Carleton Ravens	29-36	Laval Rouge et Or	0-1	PEPS Stadium, Quebec City		Recap

== Regular season and playoffs ==
The Ravens played an 8-game regular season schedule, playing all but two OUA football teams, the Guelph Gryphons and the Queen's Golden Gaels.

=== Schedule ===
Date	Time	Opponent	Rank	Site	TV	Result	Attendance
August 28	7:07 pm	at McMaster Marauders		Ron Joyce Stadium; Hamilton		L 10–40	5,427
September 4	7:15 pm	No. 8 Western Mustangs	No. 9	MNP Park; Ottawa		W 38–31	5,000
September 9	1:07 pm	at Toronto Varsity Blues	No. 6	Varsity Stadium; Toronto		W 65–7	1,530
September 17	1:00 pm	No. 8 Laurier Golden Hawks^{†}	No. 4	MNP Park; Ottawa		L 16–17	2,819
September 24	1:07 pm	at York Lions	No. 10	Alumni Field; Toronto		W 50–7	1,261
October 1	1:00 pm	No. 7 Ottawa Gee-Gees	No. 10	TD Place Stadium; Ottawa (Panda Game)	CityTV	W 43–23	23,329
October 7	1:00 pm	Windsor Lancers	No. 6	MNP Park; Ottawa		W 53–10	1,000
October 22	1:07 pm	at Waterloo Warriors	No. 6	Warrior Field; Waterloo		W 43–15	553
October 29	1:00 pm	No. 9 Ottawa Gee-Gees	No. 8	MNP Park; Ottawa (OUA Quarter-final)		W 45–9	3,000
November 5	1:00 pm	at No. 3 Western	No. 8	TD Stadium; London (OUA Semi-final)		L 24–51	2,000
^{†}Homecoming; Rankings from CIS Top 10 released prior to game; All times are in Eastern time

== Game summaries ==
=== Vs. McMaster ===
Carleton @ McMaster

Team	1	2	3	4	Total
Ravens	0	10	0	0	10
• Marauders	14	13	10	3	40

- Date: August 28
- Location: Ron Joyce Stadium, Hamilton
- Game start: 7:07 PM EDT
- Game attendance: 5,427
- Game weather: 28°C, A few clouds; Wind: 7 km/h
- Referee: K. Baird

=== Vs. Western ===
Western @ Carleton

Team	1	2	3	4	Total
Mustangs	0	14	10	7	31
• Ravens	7	17	0	14	38

- Date: September 4
- Location: MNP Park, Ottawa
- Game start: 7:15 PM EDT
- Game attendance: 5,000
- Game weather: 24°C, Slightly cloudy; Wind: 10 km/h
- Referee: Kevin Horton

=== Vs. Toronto ===
Carleton @ Toronto

Team	1	2	3	4	Total
• Ravens	7	28	14	16	65
Varsity Blues	0	0	0	7	7

- Date: September 10
- Location: Varsity Stadium, Toronto
- Game start: 1:07 PM EDT
- Game attendance: 1,530
- Game weather: 27°C, Overcast with sun; Wind: 16 km/h
- Referee: K. Mickleboro

=== Vs. Laurier ===
Laurier @ Carleton

Team	1	2	3	4	Total
• Golden Hawks	0	7	7	3	17
Ravens	2	5	9	0	16

- Date: September 18
- Location: MNP Park, Ottawa
- Game start: 1:00 PM EDT
- Game attendance: 2,819
- Game weather: 21°C, Rainy; Wind: 19 km/h
- Referee: K. Mickleboro

=== Vs. York ===
Carleton @ York

Team	1	2	3	4	Total
• Ravens	14	10	14	12	50
Lions	0	7	0	0	7

- Date: September 24
- Location: Alumni Field, Toronto
- Game start: 1:07 PM EDT
- Game attendance: 1,261
- Game weather: 17°C, Mainly Sunny, Wind NNE 13 km/h
- Referee: K. Baird

=== Vs. Ottawa ===
Ottawa @ Carleton

Team	1	2	3	4	Total
Gee-Gees	10	3	3	7	23
• Ravens	10	11	12	10	43

- Date: October 1
- Location: TD Place Stadium, Ottawa
- Game start: 1:00 PM EDT
- Game attendance: 23,329
- Game weather: 16°C, Cloudy, Wind 14 km/h
- Referee: Kevin Horton
- Television network: City

=== Vs. Windsor ===
Windsor @ Carleton

Team	1	2	3	4	Total
Lancers	0	7	3	0	10
• Ravens	4	17	14	18	53

- Date: October 7
- Location: MNP Park, Ottawa
- Game start: 1:00 PM EDT
- Game attendance: 1,000
- Game weather: 21°C, Mostly Sunny, Wind 14 km/h
- Referee: Kevin Horton

=== Vs. Waterloo ===
Carleton @ Waterloo

Team	1	2	3	4	Total
• Ravens	17	14	8	4	43
Warriors	0	7	8	0	15

- Date: October 22
- Location: Warrior Field, Waterloo
- Game start: 1:07 PM EDT
- Game attendance: 553
- Game weather: 5°C, Sunny with clouds, Wind 20 km/h
- Referee: J. Pringle

=== OUA Playoff Quarterfinal vs. Ottawa ===
Ottawa @ Carleton

Team	1	2	3	4	Total
Gee-Gees	0	3	0	6	9
• Ravens	10	17	18	0	45

- Date: October 29
- Location: MNP Park, Ottawa
- Game start: 1:00 PM EDT
- Game attendance: 3,000
- Game weather: 4°C, Cloudy, Wind 8 km/h
- Referee: Kevin Horton

This marked Carleton's first home playoff game since 1986 and their first playoff match against their cross-town rivals since 1996 and their third overall playoff meeting against the Gee-Gees.

=== OUA Playoff Semifinal vs. Western ===
Carleton @ Western

Team	1	2	3	4	Total
Ravens	0	17	0	7	24
• Mustangs	14	21	8	8	51

- Date: November 5
- Location: TD Stadium, London
- Game start: 1:00 PM EDT
- Game attendance: 2,000
- Game weather: 13°C, Partly cloudy, Wind WNW 15 km/h
- Referee: K. Mickleboro
