= Carleton Ravens football =

Football team representing Carleton University

Carleton Ravens
- Carleton Ravens logo
- First season: 1945; 81 years ago
- Athletic director: Jennifer Brenning
- Head coach: Vacant year, –
- Home stadium: TAAG Park
- Stadium capacity: 3,500
- Stadium surface: FieldTurf
- Location: Ottawa, Ontario
- League: U Sports
- Conference: OUA (2013–present)
- Past associations: OSLIAA (1949–1966); OIFC (1957–1966); CCIFC (1967–1970); OUAA (1971–1973); OQIFC (1974–1998)
- All-time record: –
- Postseason record: –

Titles
- Vanier Cups: 0
- Yates Cups: 0
- Dunsmore Cups: 1, 1985
- Hec Crighton winners: 0

Current uniform
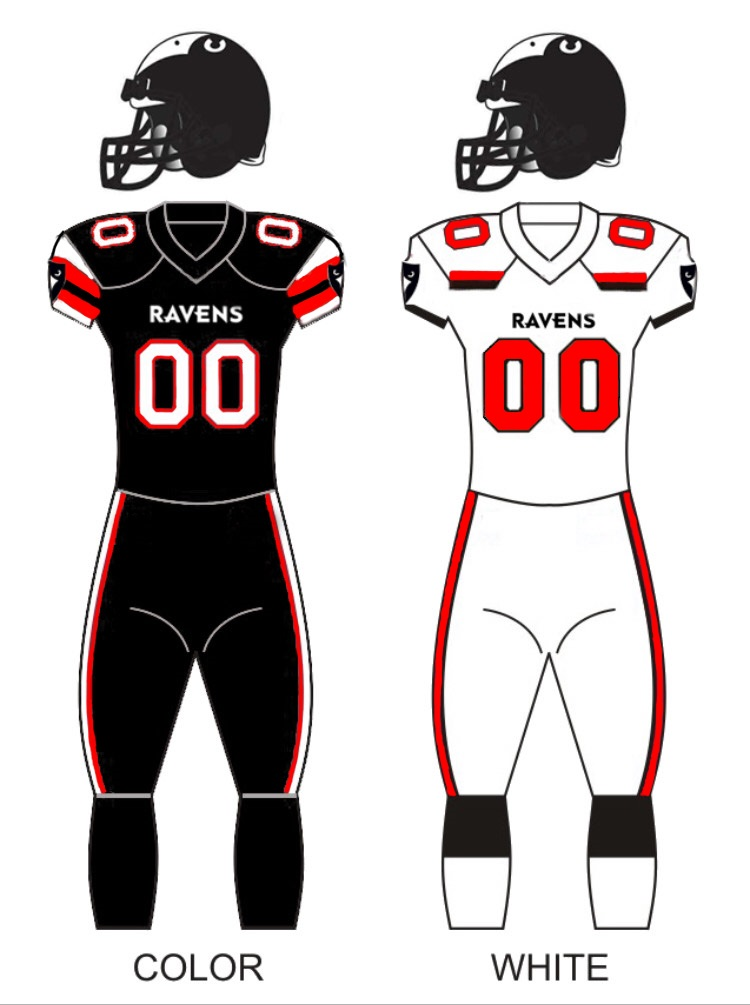
- Colours: Black, White, and Red
- Mascot: Rodney the Raven
- Outfitter: Under Armour
- Rivals: Ottawa Gee-Gees
- Website: goravens.ca

The Carleton Ravens football team represents Carleton University, which is based in Ottawa, Ontario, Canada. The Ravens play U Sports football in the Ontario University Athletics conference. The Ravens football program started in 1945 and was continuously in operation until 1998 when the program was disbanded. The football program was brought back to the university in 2011 and began play in 2013. The football team has won one conference championship, winning the Dunsmore Cup in 1985 while playing in the Ontario-Quebec Intercollegiate Football Conference.

== History ==
Historically, the Ravens football team first began play just after the Second World War in 1945 and was in continuous operation until the program was dropped in 1998. While the team had some success in the mid-1980s, poor performances and a plan by the Carleton Athletic department to invest more funds in other sports led to the sport being cut after the 1998 season. In their history, the Ravens won one Dunsmore Cup conference championship in 1985, but lost in the following Western Bowl to the Calgary Dinos 56 to 14.

=== Beginnings (1945-1949) ===
The Originals, the first Carleton College football team, played its first organized game on a rainy October day in 1945. The Second World War had just ended and 36 war veterans, turned students, lined up to face their opponents Macdonald College in Ste. Anne de Bellevue, Que. Though the Carleton College team was bigger and more experienced, Macdonald took home the win (15-0). Carleton College, established in 1942, did not have the facilities or finances for academics, let alone a football team. Citizens of Ottawa rallied to help out the newborn squad. W.D.T. Atkinson allowed the team to practice at Glebe Collegiate, the school where he was principal. Charlie Kerr, one of the players, found the team matching brown and orange hockey jerseys to wear and the Strathcona junior team donated equipment. Tiny Hermann, a former Rough Rider star, agreed to volunteer his time as head coach. Joe Scanlon, author of History of Football at Carleton, lists these fine gentlemen as the members of the Originals:

Bob Forbes, Frank MacIntyre, Mel Carson, Bill O'Neill, Johnny Urquhart, Bill Rankin, Charlie Kerr, Don Sim, Johnny Moore, Charlie Charlebois, Donald McGregor, Merton Keith Salisbury, Wayne Dunphy, Ross Cavey, Al Holtby, Johnny Chown, Jim McNee, Lyall Graham, Bernard Garand, Harold Barnhart, Jim McKnight, Chuck Winters, Peter Ayearst, Russ Brown, Rock Robillard, Ted Graves, Robert Forbes, John Bell, Bill Morgan, Doug Good, Dave Morgan, Al Holley, J W York, Ted Ricker, Peter McDougal and Johnny Shore. The two managers were Jim Hanna and Don Anderson.

The Originals ended their first season with one win, two losses and a tie. The "Ravens" name came from the Carleton College student newspaper staff in 1948, when they started using that moniker with no explanation. It may have had something to do with the team's raven-like black uniform. By 1946, Carleton College was located on First Avenue, with the Ravens occupying a 12'x15' locker room in the basement. The dressing room was in the attic and practices were held in a small, poorly-lit yard behind the school. In 1947, the team entered the intermediate league with St. Patrick's College, the University of Ottawa and Queen's University. It was in this newly-formed league that the long rivalry between the University of Ottawa and Carleton College began, and the Ravens became an integral part of university life. Fans would rally and march from First Avenue to Lansdowne Park for home games and pile onto buses for the away games. The first decade of Ravens football history endured hardships such as under-funding, changes in leadership and, as veterans graduated, depleting numbers.

=== Trying times and turnaround (1950-1959*) ===
The early 1950s were trying years for the Ravens. The low enrolment and roster numbers left Coach Arnie McWatters with a "patchwork" team. High scoring losses against teams in the newly formed Ottawa-St. Lawrence Conference left the Ravens low on morale. Ravens football came to a grinding halt, with no inter-varsity team in the 1951 season after the loss of college grant money. The seemingly bleak future of the Ravens was brightened when the college revived the program in 1952. Norm Fenn, assistant coach and full-time director of Athletics, provided the first link between the college administration and the football team, and would prove vital in the years to come. The new team entered a league with Macdonald College, Bishop's University and St. Patrick's College. There was little carryover of players from the previous decade, but the new players were ready and willing pupils.

The Ravens were on their way to a significant turnaround in 1953, with their first winning season. The new head coach, Bill Stanton, led the team to winning games against Loyola (now Concordia University) and McGill. For the first time, in 1954, Carleton was in the running for a league title. They ended the season in a tie for second place with the Royal Military College (RMC), and won the first Panda game in 1955. This season was one of the best in Ravens' history, with Carleton holding first in the league until a final game with the University of Ottawa (U of 0). However, the success would be shortlived1955 to 1959 were not to be as successful as the years before. The competition grew with the establishment of the Ontario Intercollegiate Football League, with the inclusion of the University of Ottawa, RMC, McMaster University, University of Waterloo and the Ontario Agricultural and Veterinary College at Guelph (now University of Guelph).

(*)Carleton football suspended operations for one year in 1951 due to financial constraints and began play again in 1952.

=== Coach Keith Harris (1960-1969) ===
Coach Keith Harris arrived for the start of the 1959 season, bringing needed leadership and routine to the Ravens squad. He began the Monday night "horror movie" tradition where films of previous games were picked apart and analyzed. Recruitment strategies by Harris picked young men from the registration lines in September. In the 1960s, they also saw the first football training camps, where tactical knowledge and skills, along with kinship, were developed. The players did odd jobs on campus to earn room and board in the new campus fieldhouse at the newly opened Rideau Campus. Harris was also the assistant director of Athletics while Norm Fenn, assistant coach, filled the position of director.

The results of these changes began to surface as early as the 1960 season, when the Ravens beat RMC twice in a row and non-winning games had small point spreads. For the first time in five years, no team shut the Ravens out, and player retention from year-to-year was on the rise. In 1962, Carleton fought its way to the top of the Ottawa-St. Lawrence conference, ready to take the conference title. Carleton challenged the first-place team in the conference: the McMaster Marauders. Although both morale and skill were at an all-time high, the McMaster team won, putting Carleton in second place. The 1963 season was also very successful, and 1964 brought Pedro the Panda back to Carleton after an eight-year stay with the Gee-Gees. Players like Bob Amer, Dave Dalton and Gord Pranschke set league records. These three players, along with Murray Thrift, Larry Matheson and Earl Hammond, made the 1965 league all-star game. A unique challenge was presented to Carleton's football Ravens in 1967, when St. Patrick's College, one of Carleton's frequent opponents, was incorporated into Carleton University. The two very separate football teams were to become one squad. By 1968, the integrated Ravens team earned a second-place finish and sixth-place nationally. The 1960s were truly the Ravens' first Golden Age.

=== Tougher competition (1970-1979) ===
The Ravens football club moved from the mediocre Central Canada Intercollegiate Conference (CCIC) into the highly-competitive Ontario University Athletic Association (OUAA) in 1971. This league contained the nationally ranked University of Toronto Varsity Blues and the Queen's University Golden Gaels. Carleton's first game in the OUAA was against the Varsity Blues. Though they were the underdogs, the Ravens upset the Blues with an impressive 12-3 win. One of the highlights of the 1971 season was the Panda Game, when the number one team in the nation, the Gee-Gees, was upset by the Ravens 28-14. All in all, the 1971 season was an impressive debut in the OUAA.

The 1972 highlights included a phenomenal game against Waterloo, where the offence finally proved themselves with a 35-6 score. The Ravens seemed to score every time they touched the ball. After shattering 21 team records, the Ravens were proud going into the 1974 season. The Ravens struggled, but secured a 10th-place national ranking, obtaining a playoff spot in the OUAA eastern division. Though the Ravens didn't take the Panda game or the playoff semi-final with Toronto, 1974 was a season where the Ravens commanded the respect of the OUAA.

1975 and 1976 were rough years for the team. Coach Kim McCuaig left to work full time with the Athletics Department and was replaced by Brian Kealey. These two seasons were, in fact, winless, but the 1977, 1978 and 1979 seasons got the attention of the league and eventually the entire nation! Pat Stoqua, a Ravens basketball star, joined the team in 1977 and was a key contributor to the defence strategy. A whopping 61-0 exhibition win against Royal Military College gave the Ravens the spirit and confidence needed to win against the Gee-Gees, in a tremendous show of defensive skills. This was the first time in six years that the Ravens had won against their eternal foe. The Ravens were legitimate contenders in the league and the 1977 Panda game was won 36-16 by Carleton.

The 1978 team won a title at the Ontario-Quebec pre-season jamboree, and was ready for anything. When Coach Kealey joined the team in 1975, he vowed that the team would reach the College Bowl by 1980, and this dream was finally looking attainable. The Panda Game was, yet again, the deciding game for a playoff spot. The Ravens repeated their stellar performance from the previous year and won 24-13.

1979 was considered the "Year of the Ravens". University football forecasters predicted that the team would finish first or second in the eastern division. The Carleton Ravens dream team went on to win three consecutive games, making them the only undefeated team in the conference and third in the country, the highest ranking ever obtained by a Ravens football team. The club began to receive media attention as the biggest potential national contender on the block. Queen's Golden Gaels became the team to beat to solidify the conference title. The Carleton Ravens lost the semifinal against the Queen's Golden Gaels 1979.

=== Successful years (1980-1989) ===
The Ravens entered 1980 with a positive outlook and the determination to take it one game at a time, with Coach Kealey being backed by a completely new team of assistant coaches. Though the Birds lost the first three games of the year, the season was redeemed when the Ravens brought "Pedro the Panda" home with a 30-21 win over the University of Ottawa Gee-Gees.

1982 brought a new head coach, Wayne (Ace) Powell Jr., as well as some reforms. Training camp had the Ravens practicing two or three times a day, with a largely veteran team that was hungry for a taste of success. Highlights of the season included the first win against Queen's Golden Gaels since 1974. Things were definitely starting to look up for the team, with a 28-17 win over Bishop's that placed the Ravens in second place in the Ontario-Quebec Intercollegiate Football Conference (O-QIFC). However, the next loss (19-7) against the Gee-Gees, ended the season.

Cam Collins, Clark Oliver, Dan Petschenig, Steve Hamlin and Tom Timlin formed the nucleus of the 1983 team. An exciting see-saw battle between the Ravens and fIfth-ranked Bishop's team gave the Ravens their first win of the season. A three-game winning streak followed and wide receiver John Dawley helped to turn around the Panda Game, which the Ravens snagged 33-28. After just one season of heading up the coaching staff, Ace Powell managed to bring the Ravens to the O-QIFC playoffs.

The 1984 team was stacked with many potential CFL drafts. A 10-9 win over Queen's, which was in the midst of negotiating the establishment of an elite league with Western, Toronto and McGill, was the highlight of the season. The Ravens bulldozed over Bishop's, the third-ranked team in Canada at the time. After this game, the Bishop's coach stated, "I said at the season's start that I felt Carleton had the best team in the conference and today they went out and proved it." The Ravens were ninth in the country going into the 1984 Panda game. Predictions from NFL executives to local radio personalities pointed to a Ravens'victory. As expected, Pedro went to the Ravens. The 1984 season was the best year the Ravens had had for years. Yet no one was prepared for 1985 and 1986, the two most successful seasons in Ravens history.

The 1985 team began the season with a very balanced attack against its opponents, using the new Cam Collins-Mark Brown quarterback-wide receiver combination to fuel the offence. Fan support was at an all-time high and the Ravens took home their third Panda game in a row, a first in Ravens' history. After a 40-20 win over Bishop's in play-offs, the Birds found themselves heading to the Ontario-Quebec-conference final to meet the Concordia Stingers for the first time since the days of Coach Harris (1962). Fullback, Mark Skidmore, in his first start for Ravens scored 4 touchdowns (tied record CIS most touchdowns in a playoff game) to lead to Carleton to victory 46-21.

Everyone in Ottawa and the surrounding areas had Ravens fever as the Carleton team headed to Calgary to face the Dinosaurs in the Western Bowl (Vanier Cup semi-final). In -32C weather, the Ravens season came to an end with a 56-14 win for the Calgary Dinosaurs. However, all was not lost - the Ravens enjoyed the best season in the history of the club. They were the first to win a playoff game as well as a league championship, and the first to enter the Final Four.

The 1986 team fed off the fire of the 1985 squad. Many chose the Ravens to repeat their O-QIFC title. Mark Brown and Mark Skidmore in the backfield on fire for Five consecutive wins over Bishop's, Ottawa U., Queen's and McGill made it seem as if the Ravens were surely on their way to the Western Bowl once again. The 30-29 Panda game loss that followed was felt to be perhaps the biggest upset of the year. But the Ravens didn't let it stop them. Their 6- 1-0 record sent them to the conference semi-finals, where sweet revenge for the Panda game loss was obtained with a win over the Gee-Gees. The Ravens, the defending championship team, lost in a heartbreaking game against the Bishop's Gaiters. In 1987, the Panda came back to Carleton, but 1988 and 1989 proved to be years of famine in the land of the Ravens. Would the 1990s bring years of plenty?

=== End of an era (1990-1998) ===
1990 marked the 45th year of football at Carleton University. Gary Shaver, a former Raven and assistant coach to Ace Powell, took over leadership in the 1989 season. Shaver began his second season with a very young and inexperienced team, as only two players were in their fourth year with the squad. The team experienced difficulties establishing an effective offence, a problem that would continue throughout the decade. However, two Ravens players, Phil Schnepf and Mark Whitton, were named to the 1990 O-QIFC all-star team.

1991 brought another win against the Ravens' cross-town rivals, and 1992 brought four new assistant coaches. Gary Shaver decided to step down as head coach in 1993. Over his four-year tenure, Shaver encouraged both the academic standards and performance of the players through individual counselling and assistance.

New coach Donn Smith had experience with championship teams and brought an air of success to the demoralized Ravens. A group of 11 Ottawa Sooners followed their former coach to Carleton, adding a new energy to the squad. These members knew what it was like to play for a winning team and their enthusiasm was contagious. Spirits began to rise after a respectable loss to McGill and a close 19-18 win over Ottawa University. During Smith's first season with the team, they beat the defending Vanier Cup champions the Queen's Golden Gaels. This win, after a 12-game losing streak, put the Ravens in a three-way tie for second place in the O-QIFC. Although the Ravens missed the playoffs that year, they were the most improved team in the conference. They doubled their offensive output from the previous season and trimmed points allowed by 71.

Expectations were high for the team going into the 1994 season. Veteran starting quarterback Sean O'Neil and Harry Van Hofwegan on defence were expected to help bring the team new success. After a longawaited Panda game win, the Ravens went on to win a match against the Gaels, however, they continued to struggle throughout 1995. Dave Bosveld, Harry Van Hofwegan (the O-QIFC outstanding lineman of the year) and Sean O'Neil (the TSN Russ Jackson Award winner) had individual successes that shed a positive light on the team.

The 1996 season was truly the high point of the decade as the Ravens started out well with wins against Laval, Ottawa, and Bishop's. This gave them the best start to a season since 1986. While sitting in first place in the conference and eighth nationally, a rainy day in Kingston brought a bitter loss against Queen's. A playoff spot was secured after winning against Laval, McGill and Concordia. For the third time that year, the Ravens would meet the Gee-Gees; this time in the O-QIFC semi-final. For the first time in almost a decade, the Ravens entered the realm of post-season play. Losing this playoff game was painful, but the Ravens could bask in the success of their first winning season in years. As a part of the restructuring of the Carleton University Department of Physical Recreation and Athletics, and the University Administration, the Ravens football team played its final game on October 31, 1998. From the small group of war veterans in 1945 to its 78-member squad in 1998, Ravens football made a memorable contribution to the rich heritage of Carleton University and to sports in the Ottawa area.

=== Last years ===
From 1999 to 2013, Carleton suspending its football program, citing a lack of success and the ensuing financial burden, then revived for the 2013 season. In the intervening years, several proposals to revive the football program were brought forward by the Carleton community and alumni, notably in 2000 with advocacy efforts by the Old Crow Society, which represents Carleton Football's alumni, but it was deemed premature at the time. Subsequently, a 2008 survey indicated 86% of students were in favour of resuscitating the university's football program. The team planned to form an independent corporate entity with its own revenue stream—a model that has proven successful at other schools, notably Laval University.

== The Old Crow Society ==
The Old Crow Society, established in 1963, is a group of Carleton University football alumni. With the encouragement of coach Keith Harris, Ravens veterans Jim Sevigny, Norm Jamison, Jeff White and Kim McCuaig established this group to further football at Carleton and nurture lasting team kinship. Over the years, the Old Crows have provided support through fundraising, contests and selling concessions at the home games, like Crow Burgers. The Old Crow Society held an annual dinner to honour Ravens, young and old, and to present the O-QIFC Frank Tindall Trophy for Coach of the Year, an award the Crows inaugurated in 1969. The Old Crow Society serves as the living testimony of Carleton's football legacy.

=== Historical regular season results (1953–1998) ===
Season	Games	Won	Lost	Tied	Pct %	PF	PA	Standing	Playoffs
1953	5	2	2	1	.500	52	52	4th in OSLIAA	—
1954	4	2	2	0	.500	42	30	3rd in OSLIAA	—
1955	6	4	2	0	.667	72	62	2nd in OSLIAA	—
1956	7	2	5	0	.286				
1957	7	1	6	0	.188	81	275	5th in OIFC	—
1958	7	1	6	0	.188	45	183	5th in OIFC	—
1959	7	0	7	0	.000	22	180	6th in OIFC	—
1960	7	2	5	0	.286	54	122	5th in OIFC	—
1961	7	2	5	0	.286	98	86	4th in OIFC	—
1962	7	5	2	0	.714	214	70	2nd in OIFC	Lost to McMaster Marauders 10–6 in final
1963	7	5	2	0	.714	148	81	3rd in OIFC	—
1964	7	3	4	0	.429	183	196	4th in OIFC	—
1965	7	5	2	0	.714	148	113	2nd in OIFC	—
1966	7	4	3	0	.571	138	137	4th in OIFC	Did not qualify
1967	7	5	2	0	.714	163	101	3rd in CCFC	Did not qualify
1968	6	4	2	0	.667	120	58	2nd in CCFC West	Did not qualify
1969	6	4	1	1	.750	148	78	2nd in CCFC West	Did not qualify
1970	6	4	2	0	.667	123	118	4th in CCFC West	Did not qualify
1971	8	4	4	0	.500	141	140	3rd in OUAA Capitol	Did not qualify
1972	6	1	5	0	.167	55	146	4th in OUAA East	Did not qualify
1973	8	3	5	0	.375	152	145	4th in OUAA East	Did not qualify
1974	7	3	4	0	.429	148	151	4th in OQIFC East	Lost to Toronto Varsity Blues in semi-final 30–0
1975	7	2	5	0	.286	112	176	6th in OQIFC East	Did not qualify
1976	7	0	6	1	.071	108	226	6th in OQIFC East	Did not qualify
1977	7	3	4	0	.429	147	179	5th in OQIFC East	Did not qualify
1978	6	4	2	0	.667	111	93	4th in OQIFC East	Lost to Queen's Golden Gaels in semi-final 17–3
1979	6	4	2	0	.667	134	95	3rd in OQIFC East	Lost to Queen's Golden Gaels in semi-final 25–2
1980	7	1	6	0	.188	73	133	6th in OQIFC	Did not qualify
1981	7	1	6	0	.188	66	233	6th in OQIFC	Did not qualify
1982	7	2	5	0	.286	112	226	5th in OQIFC	Did not qualify
1983	7	4	3	0	.571	149	217	4th in OQIFC	Lost to Queen's Golden Gaels in semi-final 32–18
1984	7	4	3	0	.571	160	129	4th in OQIFC	Lost to Bishop's Gaiters in semi-final 23–6
1985	7	5	2	0	.714	180	125	2nd in OQIFC	Defeated Bishop's Gaiters in semi-final 40–20; Defeated Concordia Stingers in final 46–21; Lost to Calgary Dinos in Western Bowl 56–14
1986	7	6	1	0	.857	258	149	1st in OQIFC	Defeated Ottawa Gee-Gees in semi-final 33–15; Lost to Bishop's Gaiters in final 38–19
1987	7	3	4	0	0.429	112	152	4th in OQIFC	Lost to Bishop's Gaiters in semi-final 39–0
1988	7	0	7	0	0.000	53	244	6th in OQIFC	Did not qualify
1989	7	0	7	0	0.000	42	289	6th in OQIFC	Did not qualify
1990	7	1	6	0	0.143	83	225	6th in OQIFC	Did not qualify
1991	7	1	6	0	0.143	99	225	6th in OQIFC	Did not qualify
1992	7	0	7	0	0.000	44	237	6th in OQIFC	Did not qualify
1993	7	2	5	0	0.286	94	166	5th in OQIFC	Did not qualify
1994	7	2	5	0	0.286	97	224	5th in OQIFC	Did not qualify
1995	8	1	6	1	0.188	136	221	6th in OQIFC	Did not qualify
1996	8	5	3	0	0.625	137	149	4th in OQIFC	Lost to Ottawa Gee-Gees in semi-final 28–0
1997	8	1	7	0	0.125	106	174	7th in OQIFC	Did not qualify
1998	8	1	7	0	0.125	102	187	7th in OQIFC	Did not qualify

== Head coaches ==
Name	Years	Notes
Tiny Hermann	1945–1946	
Des Bloom	1946–1947	
Arnie Morrison	1947–1949	
Arnie McWatters	1949–1952	
Bill Stanton	1953–1957	
Ed Yablonski	1957–1958	
Keith Harris	1959–1968	
Kim McCuaig	1968–1975	
Brian Kealey	1975–1982	
Ace Powell	1982–1989	
Gary Shaver	1989–1993	
Donn Smith	1993–1998	
No team	1999–2012	
Steve Sumarah	2013–2021	
Corey Grant	2022–2026	

== Revival ==
For a number of years, there had been movements to revive the team, but there was no real interest from the university. However, on June 25, 2009, an announcement was made that the Lansdowne Live group, which owns the Ottawa Redblacks, the new Canadian Football League team, was in negotiations with the university to bring back the football program and play at a rebuilt Frank Clair Stadium to be shared with the CFL team and the Ottawa Gee-Gees. Lansdowne Live partner and Ravens alumnus John Ruddy has pledged $2.5 million to provide funding for the program and it would follow the private partnership model that has proved successful both financially and on the field with the Regina Rams and Laval Rouge et Or teams. The program needed to raise a minimum of $5 million in pledge commitments in order to secure final approvals, and establish Old Crows Football Inc. by May 2011 for the team to start play in time for the 2012 season.

While the group closely missed the May deadline, Old Crows Football Inc. and Carleton University announced on July 6, 2011 that the program would return in 2013. The $5 million was raised and the team operates independently by Old Crows Football Inc. as a non-profit corporate entity that will fund and market the program. Renovations to the locker rooms, coaches' offices and Keith Harris Stadium will be paid for by the Old Crows. On January 16, 2012, Steve Sumarah was named the team's head coach.

The 2013 team began the new era of Ravens football on September 2 against the Western Mustangs in London, Ontario with a 71-4 loss. They would finish the season with eight losses in eight games as was expected for a program in its first year. In 2014, the Ravens earned the revived program's first win with an away victory against the Waterloo Warriors. Overall, the team finished with a 4-4 record that year, including a memorable Hail Mary Panda Game victory over the Ottawa Gee-Gees. In 2015, the Ravens qualified for the playoffs for the first time since the 1996 season with a 5-3 record. They defeated the Queen's Golden Gaels in the first round, but lost to the Guelph Gryphons in the semi-finals. In 2016, the team hosted their first playoff game since 1986, with both games featuring wins over the Ottawa Gee-Gees. The team suffered a setback in 2017 as they finished with a 3-5 record and out of the playoffs. Three of their five losses were by five points or less. In 2018, the team went on to finish the regular season with a 5-3 record. This was enough to put them into the playoffs, where they lost in the semi-finals to the Western Mustangs. The 2019 season saw the Ravens go 2-4 through six games, making the last two regular season games must wins to keep their playoff hopes alive. The Ravens went on to upset the second place McMaster Marauders, and beat the Laurier Golden Hawks in the final two games of the season to secure a playoff spot at a 4-4 record on the season. In the quarter-final game, the Ravens lead the Guelph Gryphons 17-16 with under two minutes to play. A blocked punt by the Gryphons lead to a touchdown and a last-minute heartbreaker to end Carleton’s season.

== Traditions and rivalries ==
=== Panda Game ===
In 1955, Bryan McNulty, a University of Ottawa student and associate editor for the Fulcrum, decided to promote the rivalry between his school and Carleton University. He asked a local jeweller, Jack Snow, to donate a stuffed panda that would be named "Pedro" to be used as a Gee-Gee mascot (as they had not adopted the Gee-Gee horse mascot yet). McNulty later convinced Snow to display the panda in his front window and then organized the first "Pandanapping", a ritual in which Pedro would be stolen from each campus in various ways. "Pandanapping" would progress over the years to the point where major vandalism was involved and almost jeopardized the game's future.

In a short matter of time, both Pedro and the Panda Game itself became national icons. In 1958, after a 25-0 Gee-Gee victory, Pedro went on a world tour. He made visits to McGill University in Montreal, Dalhousie University in Halifax, the University of Western Ontario in London, Ontario, the University of British Columbia in Vancouver, UCLA in Los Angeles, and Alabama State University in Montgomery. It is said that Pedro was even sent to Peru, Mexico and Europe.

The game quickly became the most well-known football game in Canada behind the Grey Cup and the Vanier Cup. The attendance at the Panda Game often was higher than that of the Vanier Cup that same season.

In 1998, it was decided that Carleton University would be cancelling their football program at the end of the season after numerous years of sustained losses. This decision rendered the Panda Game tradition dead and left the Gee-Gees as the lone collegiate football team in the city for the first time in 53 years.

In 2013, the Panda Game returned to a great success. Approximately 4,000 fans packed into the brand-new Gee-Gees Field, the game resulted in the Gee-Gees getting their hands on a Pedro trophy after a dominant 35-10 win.

In 2014 the game moved back to Lansdowne, being played for the first time at TD Place.

In 2016, the Panda Game was nationally televised and had a game day attendance of 23,329 fans at the sold out TD Place, which is the highest attendance total in modern history to watch a regular season U Sports football game.

== Ravens season-by-season record ==
Team records since the program was revived in 2013:

League Yr	Team Yr	Games	Won	Lost	Pct %	PF	PA	Standing	Playoffs
2013	2013	8	0	8	0.000	95	390	11th in OUA	Did not qualify
2014	2014	8	4	4	0.500	199	266	7th in OUA	Did not qualify
2015	2015	8	5	3	0.625	288	244	5th in OUA	Defeated Queen's Gaels in quarter-final 39-8; Lost to Guelph Gryphons in semi-final 33-21
2016	2016	8	6	2	0.750	318	150	4th in OUA	Defeated Ottawa Gee-Gees in quarter-final 45-9; Lost to Western Mustangs in semi-final 51-24
2017	2017	8	3	5	0.375	222	232	8th in OUA	Did not qualify
2018	2018	8	5	3	0.625	255	224	4th in OUA	Defeated McMaster Marauders in quarter-final 30-25; Lost to Western Mustangs in semi-final 39-13
2019	2019	8	4	4	0.500	181	214	6th in OUA	Lost to Guelph Gryphons in quarter-final 22-17
2020	Season cancelled due to COVID-19 pandemic								
2021	2021	6	2	4	0.333	99	147	4th in OUA East	Lost to Queen's Gaels in quarter-final 41-14
2022	2022	8	5	3	0.625	201	195	5th in OUA	Lost to Wilfrid Laurier Golden Hawks in quarter-final 41-13
2023	2023	8	4	4	0.500	226	168	6th in OUA	Lost to Windsor Lancers in quarter-final 14-11
2024	2024	8	2	6	0.250	217	245	8th in OUA	Did not qualify
2025	2025	8	3	5	0.375	215	320	8th in OUA	Did not qualify
2026	2026	8	1	7	0.125	170	349	10th in OUA	Did not qualify

== Ravens in the CFL ==
As of the start of the 2026 CFL season, forty-four former Ravens players have played in the CFL, three of whom are currently on CFL teams' rosters:

- Tristan Ready, Toronto (2026)
- Kaseem Ferdinand, Montreal (2025–26)
- Patrick Lavoie, Edmonton (2024)
- Jonathan Edouard, Toronto (2023–25)
- Cedrick Lavigne, Winnipeg (2022)
- Keaton Bruggeling, Ottawa, Hamilton (2022–25)
- Jack Cassar, Toronto (2021–26)
- Trevor Hoyte, Toronto, Hamilton (2021–25)
- Kwabena Asare, Edmonton, Calgary, Montreal (2019–21)
- Kene Onyeka, Ottawa (2019–25)
- Michael Domagala, Hamilton, Edmonton, Ottawa (2019–23)
- Jay Dearborn, Saskatchewan (2019–21)
- Zack Annen, Montreal (2018)
- Malcolm Carter, Montreal (2018–19)
- Justin Howell, Ottawa (2018–25)
- Tunde Adeleke, Calgary, Hamilton, Toronto (2017–24)
- Emmanuel Adusei, Saskatchewan (2017–18)
- Nate Behar, Edmonton, Ottawa, Montreal (2017–24)
- Nate Hamlin, BC, Edmonton (2017–18, 2022)
- Mike Homewood, Saskatchewan, Calgary (2002–04)
- Jason Kralt, BC Lions, Ottawa (1999-2005)
- Cameron Legault, Winnipeg, Calgary, BC Lions, Ottawa (1998-2006)
- Harry Van Hofwegen, Winnipeg, BC Lions, Edmonton (1996–98)
- Jason Mallett, Saskatchewan, Hamilton (1995-2003)
- Carl Coulter, BC Lions, Ottawa, Toronto, Saskatchewan, Hamilton (1990-2004)
- Mike Philbrick, Ottawa, Hamilton (1990, 1994-2001)
- Moustafa Ali, Winnipeg, Calgary (1989–90)
- Bob Forest, Ottawa (1989)
- Michael Allen, Winnipeg, Ottawa, BC Lions (1988–94)
- Andrew Murray, BC Lions, Toronto, Ottawa (1988–94)
- Dan Petschenig, Toronto (1985–88)
- Lance Thompson, Hamilton (1985)
- Jim DeSilva, Ottawa (1984–85)
- Kevin Dalliday, Ottawa (1983–84)
- Gary Cook, Ottawa (1980–82)
- David Green, Toronto (1979)
- Malcolm Inglis, Ottawa (1979–81)
- Pat Stoqua, Ottawa (1979–84)
- Joe Colvey, Ottawa, Montreal, Calgary (1975–77)
- Brian Hedges, Ottawa (1976–79)
- Peter Stenerson, Ottawa (1975–82)
- Dave Montagano, Winnipeg, Saskatchewan, Hamilton, Edmonton (1974–78)
- John Kennedy, Montreal, Ottawa, BC Lions, Toronto (1971–76)
- Stu Kennedy, Ottawa (1952–53)
- Johnny Shore, Toronto (1949–54)
- Matt Robillard, Montreal, Ottawa (1952–54)*
- Benny MacDonnell, Ottawa (1949–54)*
- Frank Dunlap, Ottawa, Toronto (1945–51)*
- Jake Dunlap, Ottawa, Toronto, Hamilton (1945–54)*
- Don Grimes, Ottawa (1945–47)*
- Orville Burke, Ottawa, (1936–46)*
- Tony McCarthy, Ottawa (1934–47)*

(*)denotes played college football at St. Patrick’s College pre-merger with Carleton.

== National award winners ==
- J. P. Metras Trophy: Jim DeSilva (1983), Harry Van Hofwegen (1995)
- Presidents' Trophy: Tom Timlin (1983)
- Peter Gorman Trophy: Mark Brown (1985)
- Russ Jackson Award: Sean O'Neill (1996)

== Carleton Ravens football records ==
All records are as of the conclusion of the 2019 season.

=== Scoring records ===
Most points, game

- 24 – Ross Reid, Carleton vs. York, October 27, 1969; Joe Barnabe, Carleton vs. Bishop’s, November 9, 1985; Mark Skidmore, November 16, 1985.
- 18 – Clem Chappell, Carleton vs. Laurentian, October 1, 1966; Scott Alexander, Carleton vs. Waterloo, October 13, 1973; John Dawley, Carleton vs. Ottawa, October 22, 1983; Jeff Morris, Carleton vs. Bishop’s, September 28, 1985; Leo Benvenuti, Carleton vs. Bishop’s, October 11, 1986, David Bosveld, Carleton vs. Queens 1993, Ed Joseph, Carleton vs. Laval, October 5, 1996, Nate Behar, Carleton vs. Ottawa, September 20, 2014, Michael Domagala, Carleton vs. Toronto, September 22, 2018.

Most points, season

(Note, up until 1994, the Ravens played a 7-game schedule. From 1995 to present, they play an 8-game schedule.)

- 82 – Michael Domagala, 2015; Michael Domagala, 2016
- 76 – Michael Domagala, 2018
- 68 – Jeff Morris, 1985
- 63 – Michael Domagala, 2017
- 62 – Scott Alexander, 1973
- 61 – Michael Domagala 2014
- 57 – Jeff Morris, 1986
- 54 – Nathaniel Behar, 2016; Jayde Rowe, 2016

Most points, career

- 367 – Michael Domagala
- 228 – Jeff Morris
- 165 – Mario Arnone
- 134 – Scott Alexander
- 132 – Nathaniel Behar, Joe Barnabe
- 114 – Nathan Carter
- 96 – Gary Cook, Kyle Van Wynsberghe
- 90 – Mark Brown

Most touchdowns, game

- 4 - Ross Reid, Carleton vs. York, October 27, 1969; Joe Barnabe, Carleton vs. Bishop’s, November 9, 1985; Mark Skidmore, November 16, 1985.
- 3 – Clem Chappell, Carleton vs. Laurentian, October 1, 1966; Scott Alexander, Carleton vs. Waterloo, October 13, 1973; John Dawley, Carleton vs. Ottawa, October 22, 1983; Leo Benvenuti, Carleton vs. Bishop’s, October 11, 1986, David Bosveld, Carleton vs Queens 1993, Nate Behar, Carleton vs. Ottawa, September 20, 2014.

Most touchdowns, season

- 10 – Scott Alexander, 1973
- 9 – Nathaniel Behar, 2016; Jayde Rowe, 2016
- 8 – Bruno Dinardo, 1982; Nathaniel Behar, 2014
- 7 – Con Poulin, 1956; Tommy Mann, 1957; John Dever, 1962; Ross Reid, 1969; Gary Cook, 1977; Mark Brown, 1986; Nathaniel Behar, 2015; Nathan Carter, 2018
- 6 –Jim Sevigny, 1963; Gord Pranschke, 1965; Don Gormley, 1971; Joe Barnabe, 1983; Nathan Carter, 2017

Most touchdowns, career

- 22 – Scott Alexander; Nathaniel Behar, Joe Barnabe
- 19 – Nathan Carter
- 16 – Gary Cook; Kyle Van Wynsberghe
- 15 – Mark Brown
- 14 – Bruno Dinardo; Ross Reid, Phil Iloki

Most field goals, game

- 5 – Jeff Morris, Carleton vs. Bishop’s, September 28, 1985; Michael Domagala, Carleton vs. Toronto, September 22, 2018
- 4 – Mario Arnone, Carleton vs. McGill, 1976, Jim McMillan, Carleton vs. Concordia, September 7, 1997, Jim McMillan, Carleton vs. Laval, September 27, 1998; Michael Domagala, Carleton vs. Toronto, September 19, 2015; Michael Domagala, Carleton vs. Ottawa, October 3, 2015; Michael Domagala, Carleton vs. Ottawa, October 1, 2017
- 3 – Don “Duke” Hayes, Carleton vs. McGill, October 23, 1954; Mario Arnone, Carleton vs. Concordia, September 10, 1977; Jeff Morris, Carleton vs. Bishop’s, 1986; Michael Domagala, Carleton vs. Toronto, October 4, 2014; Michael Domagala, Carleton vs. Waterloo, September 16, 2017; Michael Domagala, Carleton vs. Western, August 26, 2018.

Most field goals, season

- 16 – Michael Domagala, 2015; Michael Domagala, 2018
- 14 – Michael Domagala, 2016; Michael Domagala, 2017;
- 13 – Jeff Morris, 1985; Michael Domagala, 2014
- 10 – Roy Gallo, 1979

Most field goals, career

- 70 – Michael Domagala
- 38 – Jeff Morris
- 26 – Mario Arnone

Longest field goal

- 50 – Michael Domagala, Carleton vs. Western, August 26, 2018
- 48 – Michael Domagala, Carleton vs. Toronto, September 10, 2016; Michael Domagala, Carleton vs. York, October 12, 2018.
- 47 – Michael Domagala, Carleton vs. Guelph, October 21, 2017
- 45 – Jim McMillan, Carleton vs. Concordia, September 12, 1998
- 44 – Jeff Morris, Carleton vs. Waterloo, September 8, 1984; Michael Domagala, Carleton vs. Toronto, September 22, 2018.
- 43 – Michael Domagala, Carleton vs. Ottawa, September 20, 2014; Michael Domagala, Carleton vs. Ottawa, October 3, 2015; Michael Domagala, October 7, 2016

Most points after touchdown, game

- 8 – Michael Domagala, Carleton vs. Windsor, September 12, 2015; Michael Domagala, Carleton vs. Toronto, September 10, 2014; Michael Domagala, Carleton vs. Toronto, 2016
- 7 – Don McGregor, Carleton vs. Ontario Agricultural College (Guelph), October 27, 1962; Mario Arnone, Carleton vs. RMC, 1977; Jeff Morris, Carleton vs. Bishop’s, October 11, 1986.

Most points after touchdown, season

- 35 – Michael Domagala, 2016
- 30 – Michael Domagala, 2015
- 26 – Don McGregor, 1961; Michael Domagala, 2018
- 25 – Jeff Morris, 1985; Jeff Morris, 1986
- 24 – Mario Arnone – 1974
- 22 – Michael Domagala, 2018

Most points after touchdown, career

- 132 – Michael Domagala
- 78 – Jeff Morris
- 66 – Mario Arnone
- 41 – Mike Sharp
- 26 – Don McGregor

== Notable alumni ==
- Carl Coulter: Played in the Canadian Football League for 15 seasons as a centre, including one-year stints with the Ottawa Rough Riders and Ottawa Renegades. He was a CFL Eastern All-star twice and a CFL All-star once. He was a member of the 87th Grey Cup champion Hamilton Tiger-Cats.
- Michael Allen: Played in the CFL for seven seasons as a defensive back and played with the Ottawa Rough Riders for two seasons. He was a three-time Grey Cup champion.
- Joe Colvey: Played in the CFL for three seasons as a defensive back and was a member of the 64th Grey Cup champion Ottawa Rough Riders.
- Frank Graves: Pollster. Played for Carleton as a lineman in 1971.
- Jason Kralt: Played in the CFL for seven seasons as a linebacker including four spent with the Ottawa Renegades. He was a member of the 88th Grey Cup champion BC Lions, but did not play in the championship game due to injury.
- Cameron Legault: Played in the CFL for eight seasons as a defensive tackle, including one year with the Ottawa Renegades. He won the 88th Grey Cup championship as a member of the BC Lions. He also won the Dr. Beattie Martin Trophy as the most outstanding Canadian player in the West Division.
- Michael Philbrick: Played in the CFL for nine seasons as a defensive lineman and played one game for the Ottawa Rough Riders after being drafted by the team in 1990. He was named an East Division All-star three times and was a member of the 87th Grey Cup championship team with the Hamilton Tiger-Cats.
- Frank McGee: Played for Carleton in the late 1940s. He went on to become a Member of Parliament and a Cabinet Minister, then a nationally-known journalist and host of a CBC news show.
- Mark Lee: Quarterback of the Ravens in the mid-to-late 1970s. Became one of Canada’s prominent sports broadcasters with Rogers Sportsnet and formerly with CBC Sports.
- Hugh Fraser: Olympic sprinter who skipped the 1978 Commonwealth Games in order to play for Carleton. He would serve on the Ontario Court of Justice and the Canadian Human Rights Tribunal.
