= Tristan Ready =

Canadian gridiron football player (born 2001)

- Ready with the Toronto Argonauts in 2026

No. 81 – Toronto Argonauts
- Position: Wide receiver
- Roster status: Active
- CFL status: National

Personal information
- Born: September 14, 2001 (age 25); Boucherville, Quebec, Canada
- Listed height: 6 ft 1 in (1.85 m)
- Listed weight: 203 lb (92 kg)

Career information
- High school: Arnprior District (Arnprior, Ontario); St. Joseph (Ottawa, Ontario)
- University: Carleton (2021–2025)
- CFL draft: 2025: undrafted

Career history
- Toronto Argonauts (2026–present)

Awards and highlights
- First-team OUA All-Star (2025); Second-team OUA All-Star (2024)
- Stats at CFL.ca

Tristan Ready (born September 14, 2001) is a Canadian professional football wide receiver for the Toronto Argonauts of the Canadian Football League (CFL). He played U Sports football for the Carleton Ravens.

== Early life ==
Ready was born on January 21, 2001 in Boucherville, Quebec. He attended St. Joseph High School in Ottawa, Ontario and Arnprior District High School in Arnprior, Ontario.

== University career ==
Ready played U Sports football for the Carleton Ravens from 2021 to 2025. In 31 games, he had 122 receptions for 2,078 yards and ten touchdowns. Ready was a second-team Ontario University Athletics All-Star and a first-team OUA All-Star selection in 2024 and 2025 respectively.

== Professional career ==
After going unselected in the 2025 CFL draft, Ready signed with the Toronto Argonauts as an undrafted free agent. On May 31, 2026, he was assigned to the practice roster. On June 25, Ready was elevated to the active roster and made his CFL debut the following day against the Saskatchewan Roughriders. On July 1, he reverted to the practice roster. On July 17, Ready was promoted again. On July 22, he was re-signed to the practice roster. On September 18, Ready was elevated. On September 21, he was demoted back to the practice roster. On October 22, Ready was activated for a fourth time in the 2026 season. He had two catches for 18 yards in the regular season finale against the Montreal Alouettes.
