= Windsor Lancers rugby =

University of Windsor men's rugby team

Windsor Lancers
- Union: Ontario University Athletics
- Nickname: Lancers
- Founded: 1988
- Ground: Lancer Stadium (Capacity: 6,000)
- Coach: (Canada) Michael Thorne
- Captain: (Canada) Chris Jackson
- Top scorer: (Canada) Stephen Young
Team kit

First match
- Royal Military College 7 - 0 Windsor Lancers (16 September 2001)

Largest win
- Toronto Varsity Blues 3 - 53 Windsor Lancers (16 October 2005)

Largest defeat
- McMaster Marauders 97 - 6 Windsor Lancers (2 October 2004)

Official website
- www.golancers.ca

The Windsor Lancers rugby are the men's rugby team of the University of Windsor in Windsor, Ontario, Canada. Established in 1988, the team is affiliated to Ontario University Athletics (OUA) and briefly achieved varsity status from the University for the 2000 to 2008 seasons. Since 2009, the team has played privately as a club.

== History ==
The program was started in 1988 by Akos Tozer, Heath Chantler, Stu Baille and current Rugby Canada CEO Graham Brown. In the program's early years, the team played exhibition games against OUA sides as well as against nearby American Collegiate teams. In 1991, the Lancers were admitted into the Michigan Collegiate League, where they played against teams like Michigan State University, Bowling Green State University, the University of Michigan, and In 2000 the team was awarded full varsity status by the University of Windsor and gained entry into the [OFFICIAL-OUA-URL Ontario University Athletics] conference. The team lost its varsity status at the end of the 2008 season. In 2009 it restarted as a club team and won the 2010 Detroit Ruck City Tournament.

=== Year by Year results ===
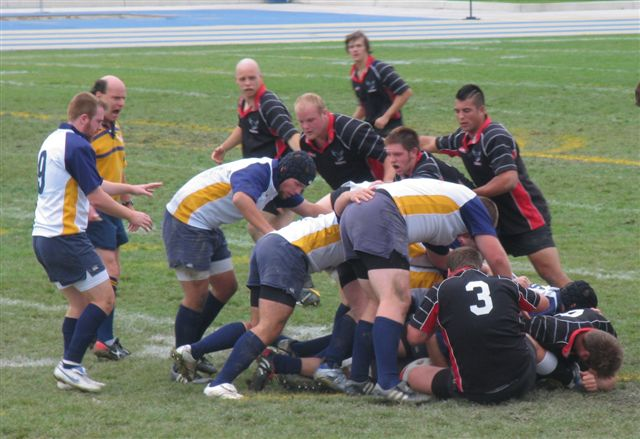
Windsor Lancers vs. Carleton Ravens, 2006

- 2000-2001: 0-8-0 (Last Place in OUA Conference)
- 2001-2002: 0-6-2 (Last Place in OUA Conference)
- 2002-2003: 2-4-0 (3rd in OUA Tier II Conference)
- 2003-2004: 2-5-1 (4th in OUA Tier II Conference)
- 2004-2005: 2-5-0 (4th in OUA West Conference)
- 2005-2006: 5-3-0 (3rd in OUA West Conference)
- 2006-2007: 1-7-0 (6th in OUA West Conference)
- 2007-2008: 3-4-0 (5th in OUA West Conference)
- 2008-2009: 1-5-1 (6th in OUA West Conference)

=== OUA All-Stars ===
- 2001
  - Matt Piatek, Inside Centre
- 2002
  - Andrew Pilkington, Fly Half
  - Colin Campbell, Scrum Half
  - Matt McCartney, Hooker
  - Scott Liebrock, Flanker
- 2003
  - Steve Piatek, Fullback
  - Andy Pilkington, Centre
  - Dan Clement, Flanker
- 2004
  - Steve Piatek, Fullback
  - Andrew Ziricino, Fly Half
- 2005
  - Steve Piatek, Centre
  - Matt McCartney, Flanker
  - Damon McLachlan, Fullback
  - Ian McEwen, #8
- 2006
  - Andrew Ziricino, Fly Half
  - Devin Stubel, Prop
- 2007
  - Andrew Ziricino, Fly Half
  - Graham Haigh, Fullback
- 2008
  - Stephen Young, #8
  - Kevin Mageto, Flanker

=== Rivals ===
- Bowling Green State University (Bowling Green, Ohio)
- Wilfrid Laurier University (Waterloo, Ontario)
- Trent University (Peterborough, Ontario)

=== Partner Clubs ===
- Kent Havoc
- Sarnia Saints
- Windsor Rogues
- Brampton Beavers

== 2008 Roster ==
- Ben Aylwin - Centre / Aurora Barbarians
- Tosin Bello - Wing / Windsor Rogues
- Matt Bloch - Centre / Windsor Rogues
- Joe Bwanka - Wing / London St. Georges
- Joseph Bunda - Wing / Zambia Colts
- Raoul Coleman - Hooker / Oakville Crusaders
- Loren Dillane - Centre / Balmy Beach
- Nick Gardner - Lock / Cobourg Saxons
- Brendan Groombridge - Prop / Sarnia Saints
- Chris Holmes - Hooker / Barrie
- Anthony Holt - Centre / Brampton Beavers
- Chris Jackson - Hooker / Oshawa Vikings
- Paul Kimmerly - Flanker / Oshawa Vikings
- Jamie Lamont - Flanker / Barrie
- Kevin Mageto - Flanker / Brampton Beavers
- Colin Mascaro - Lock / Windsor Rogues
- Ian McEwen - Scrum Half / Sarnia Saints
- Mike McManus - Flanker / Barrie
- Patrick Macmillan - Centre / Barrie
- Bwighane Mwafulilwa - Lock / Zambia Diggers
- Juan Palacio - Fly Half / Burlington Centaurs
- Chris Pera - Wing / Windsor Rogues
- Andrew Ttooulias - Flank / Aurora Barbarians
- Greg Tufman - Hooker / Aurora Barbarians
- William Wright - Scrum Half / Quebec City
- Steve Young - Prop / Sarnia Saints

== Honours ==
- 2 Canada Senior Men's Selections (Steve Piatek (Portugal A, Leicester Tigers) & Devin Stubel (Churchill Cup))
- 1 Canada East Selection (Steve Piatek)
- 3 Ontario Blues Selections (Steve Piatek, Stephen Young, Devin Stubel)
- 1 Canada Under-23 Selection (Devin Stubel)
- 2 Canada Under-21 Selections (Steve Piatek and Devin Stubel)
- 1 Canada Under-19 Selection (Steve Piatek)
- 6 Ontario Age Grade Selections (Steve Piatek, Devin Stubel, Ian McEwen, Bjorn McSorely, Matt Bulloch, Ryan Ivy)
- 5 2006 OUA All-star 7's selections (Mark Sheldon, Graham Haigh, Andrew Ziricino, Steve Piatek, Rob Duncan)

== Championships ==
- Truro 7's champions 2006 in Truro, Nova Scotia
- Social Side champions, Sarnia Barn Bowl 2006, 2007 and Tournament champions 2008 in Sarnia, Ontario
- Cross-Border Cup 2008 over the University of Michigan
