= Jonathan Edouard =

American gridiron football player (born 1996)

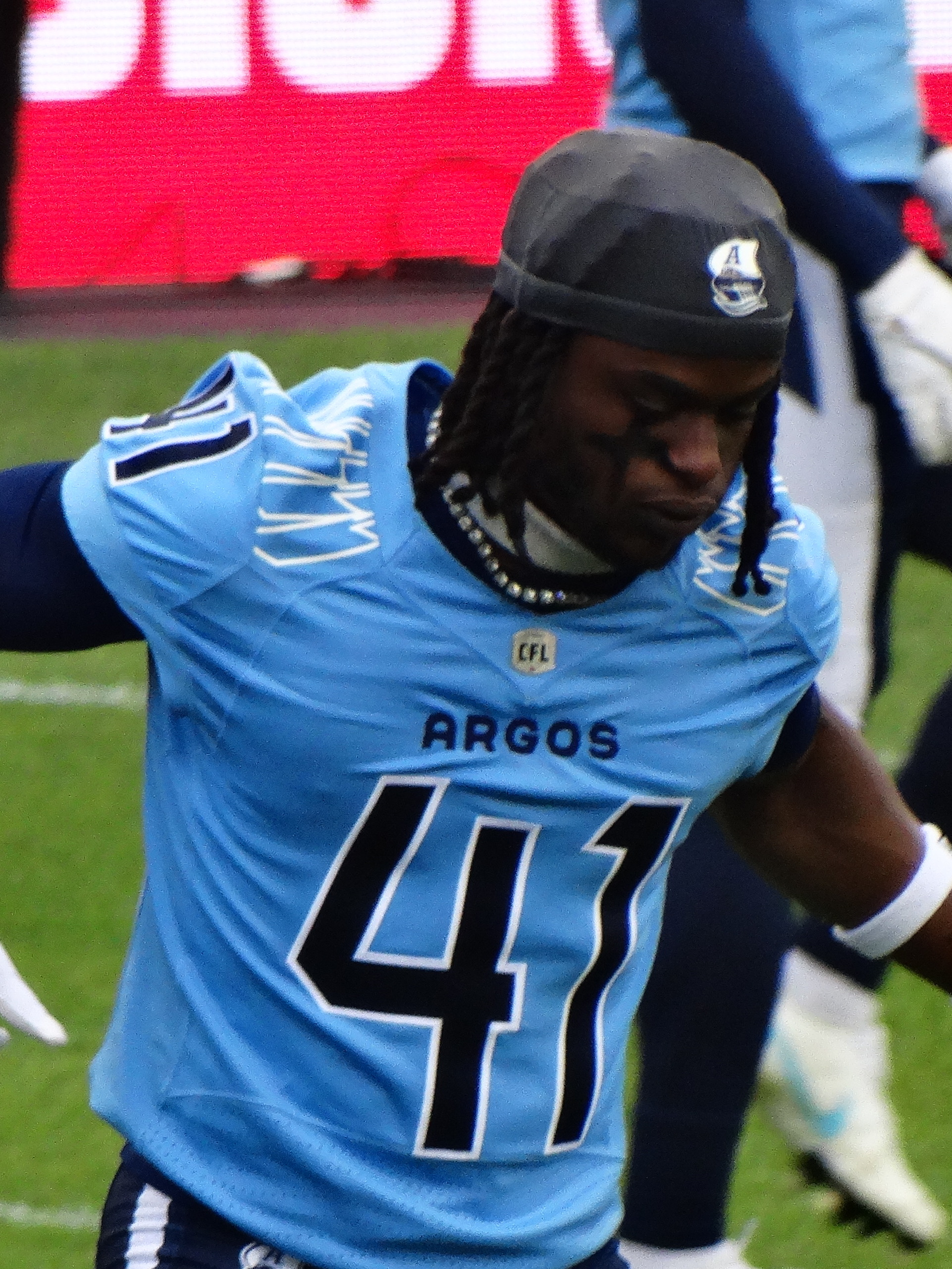
- Edouard with the Toronto Argonauts in 2024

Saskatchewan Roughriders
- Position: Defensive back
- CFL status: National

Personal information
- Born: February 24, 1996 (age 30); Orlando, Florida, U.S.
- Listed height: 5 ft 11 in (1.80 m)
- Listed weight: 185 lb (84 kg)

Career information
- College: Henderson State
- University: Carleton
- CFL draft: 2022: undrafted

Career history
- 2022–2025: Toronto Argonauts
- 2026–present: Saskatchewan Roughriders

Awards and highlights
- 2× Grey Cup champion (2022, 2024)
- Stats at CFL.ca

Jonathan Edouard (born February 24, 1996) is an American professional football defensive back for the Saskatchewan Roughriders of the Canadian Football League (CFL). He is a two-time Grey Cup champion after winning with the Toronto Argonauts in 2022 and 2024.

== University career ==
Edouard first played college football for the Henderson State Reddies from 2014 to 2016. He played in 32 games where he had 47 solo tackles, 22 assisted tackles, 0.5 sacks, and two interceptions.

After a discussion with former teammate, Dondre Wright, regarding playing in Canada, Edouard visited Ottawa and committed to playing for the Carleton Ravens, starting in 2018. In 2019, shortly after the season began, he visited the Canada–United States border to complete paperwork for a visa, but was denied re-entry to Canada and spent over a year locked out of the country. After resolving his issue, he returned to play for the Ravens in 2021 after he was granted one more year of eligibility from U Sports. Edouard played in 15 games over three seasons for the Ravens where he had 55 tackles, three interceptions, one forced fumble, and two fumble recoveries. Despite being American, he qualified for the CFL draft after playing at least three years at a Canadian university.

== Professional career ==
=== Toronto Argonauts ===
Despite testing well in the CFL Eastern Regional Combine in 2022, Edouard was not selected in the 2022 CFL draft. He later signed with the Toronto Argonauts on September 29, 2022, to a practice roster agreement. He remained on the practice roster for the remainder of the 2022 season, including for the Argonauts' victory in the 109th Grey Cup game.

In 2023, Edouard made the team's active roster following training camp and played in his first professional game on June 18, 2023, against the Hamilton Tiger-Cats, where he recorded one special teams tackle. He played in all 18 regular season games where he had six defensive tackles, 11 special teams tackles, and one sack. He also made his postseason debut in the East Final loss against the Montreal Alouettes where he had one special teams tackle.

Edouard opened the 2024 season as a backup defensive back, but soon after made his first career start on July 4, 2024, where he recorded one defensive tackle at field side cornerback. Edouard played in the first six regular season games, starting in three, where he had six defensive tackles, one special teams tackle, one interception, and one pass knockdown. He was placed on the six-game injured list and missed the rest of the regular season and the East Semi-Final, before returning for the East Final. He was moved to the injured list for the 111th Grey Cup where the Argonauts defeated the Winnipeg Blue Bombers and Edouard won his first championship.

On May 6, 2026, Edouard was released by the Argonauts.

=== Saskatchewan Roughriders ===
On June 17, 2026, it was announced that Edouard had signed with the Saskatchewan Roughriders.

== Personal life ==
Edouard was born to Belo and Enide Edouard, who were originally from Haiti. He has eight siblings.
