= Pawel Kruba =

Canadian football linebacker (born 1990)

No. 36
- Position: Linebacker

Personal information
- Born: March 21, 1990 (age 36); Windsor, Ontario, Canada
- Listed height: 5 ft 11 in (1.80 m)
- Listed weight: 210 lb (95 kg)

Career information
- High school: St. Anne (Tecumseh, Ontario)
- University: Western (2009–2013)

Career history
- 2014: Hamilton Tiger-Cats

Awards and highlights
- Presidents' Trophy (2013); First-team All-Canadian (2013); First-team OUA All-Star (2013); Second-team OUA All-Star (2012)
- Stats at CFL.ca

Pawel Kruba (born March 21, 1990) is a Canadian former professional football linebacker who played for the Hamilton Tiger-Cats of the Canadian Football League (CFL). He played CIS football at the University of Western Ontario.

== Early life ==
Pawel Kruba was born on March 21, 1990, in Windsor, Ontario. He attended St. Anne Catholic High School in Tecumseh, Ontario.

== University career ==
Kruba played CIS football for the Western Ontario Mustangs of the University of Western Ontario from 2009 to 2013. He earned second-team Ontario University Athletics (OUA) All-Star honors in 2012. In 2013, he won the Presidents' Trophy, given to the "Most Outstanding Defensive Player" in CIS football. Kruba also garnered first-team All-Canadian and first-team OUA All-Star recognition that season. He posted eight tackles in Western Ontario's 51–22 victory over the Queen’s Gaels in the 2013 Yates Cup. He recorded CIS career totals of 116 tackles, three sacks, one forced fumble, one fumble recovery, and five interceptions, two of which were returned for touchdowns. He majored in social science at Western Ontario.

== Professional career ==
At the 2013 CFL Combine, Kruba recorded the best shuttle time (4.23 s) among linebackers. However, he was not selected in the 2013 CFL draft and returned to Western Ontario for his final season of CIS football. He signed with the Hamilton Tiger-Cats of the Canadian Football League on January 29, 2014. He dressed in 14 games for the Tiger-Cats during the 2014 season and returned one kickoff for no yards. He was released by the Tiger-Cats on May 26, 2015.
