= Joe Colvey =

Profile
- Position: Defensive back

Personal information
- Born: January 19, 1948 (age 78); Montreal, Quebec, Canada
- Listed height: 5 ft 11 in (1.80 m)
- Listed weight: 194 lb (88 kg)

Career information
- University: Carleton

Career history
- 1975–1976: Ottawa Rough Riders
- 1976: Montreal Alouettes
- 1977: Calgary Stampeders
- 1977: Ottawa Rough Riders

Awards and highlights
- Grey Cup champion (1976)

Joe Colvey (born January 19, 1948) is a Canadian former professional football player who played for the Ottawa Rough Riders, Montreal Alouettes and Calgary Stampeders of the Canadian Football League (CFL). He played college football at Carleton University.
