= University of Windsor Stadium =

Stadium in Windsor, Ontario, Canada

- Alumni Stadium
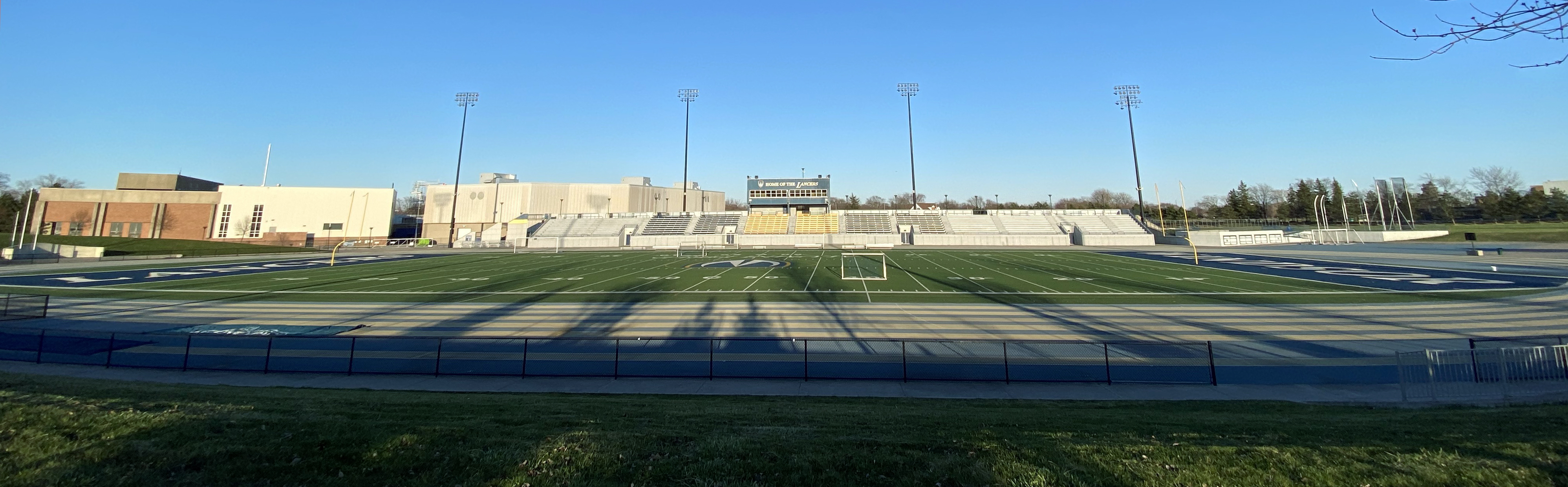
- View of the stadium in 2020
- Interactive map of University of Windsor Stadium
- Former names: South Campus Stadium; St. Dennis Centre Stadium
- Address: Canada
- Coordinates: 42°17′54″N 83°3′47″W
- Owner: University of Windsor
- Operator: University of Windsor Athletics
- Type: Stadium
- Surface: FieldTurf
- Scoreboard: Yes
- Current use: Football; Soccer; Track and field

Construction
- Groundbreaking: September 2004
- Opened: June 2005; 21 years ago
- Renovated: 2008
- Cost: $8,614,000

Tenants
- Windsor Lancers teams: football, soccer, track and field

Website
- golancers.ca/alumni-field

University of Windsor Stadium, also known as Alumni Field, is a 2,000-seat stadium located on the campus of University of Windsor in Windsor, Ontario, Canada. The stadium serves as home venue to the Windsor Lancers football, soccer, and track and field teams.

== History ==
The stadium was built in conjunction with the City of Windsor to host the 2005 Pan American Junior Athletics Championships. The total project cost $8.6 million and was built by Eastern Construction and designed by JP Thomson Associates Ltd. The stadium opened in June 2005.

The stadium is next to the St. Denis Athletic Centre.

A FieldTurf playing surface was added to the stadium after a fundraising initiative, including a large donation of $500,000 from the University of Windsor Alumni Association. At the time, this donation was the largest gift ever in the organization's history.

The 2007 Canadian Soccer League (CSL) All-star game was held at University of Windsor Stadium.

It was host to the 2007 Canadian Track and Field Championships and the 2008 Canadian Track and Field Trials.
