= Windsor Lancers =

University of Windsor athletic teams

- University: University of Windsor
- Nickname: Lancers
- Association: U Sports
- Conference: Ontario University Athletics
- Athletic director: Stephanie White
- Location: Windsor, Ontario
- First year: 1952; 74 years ago
- Varsity teams: 20 (10 men's, 9 women's)
- Football stadium: Alumni Stadium
- Basketball arena: Toldo Lancer Centre
- Ice hockey arena: Adie Knox Arena
- Softball stadium: Mic Mac Park #2
- Soccer stadium: Alumni Stadium
- Aquatics center: St. Denis Centre Pool
- Outdoor track and field venue: Alumni Stadium; Dennis Fairall Fieldhouse (indoor)
- Volleyball arena: UWM Sports Complex
- Colours: Blue and Gold
- Mascot: Winston (the Lancer)
- Website: golancers.ca
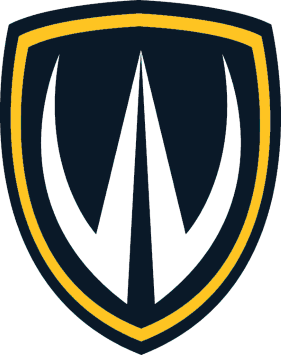

The Windsor Lancers are the varsity athletic teams that represent the University of Windsor in Windsor, Ontario, Canada. The school's varsity program supports 9 different sports. Their mascot is a lancer, and the team's colours are blue and gold. The varsity teams compete in the Ontario University Athletics provincial conference and the national U Sports organization. The school joined the Ontario-Quebec Athletic Association (now known as the OUA) in 1952.

The university offers 8 sports for women and 9 sports for men. Additionally, there are 2 sports clubs offered: men's baseball and women's fastpitch.

As of the 2015–16 season, the Lancers have won 33 national titles and 87 provincial titles. From 2010 to 2016, the Lancers have won more national championships than any other Canadian university.

Since 1990, the Windsor Lancers track and field teams have done well provincially and nationally, with the men's team winning 23 OUA titles and 9 national titles, and the women's team winning 17 OUA titles and 11 national titles, respectively.

== Varsity teams ==
The Windsor Lancers participate in the following varsity sports:

Men's sports	Women's sports
Baseball	Basketball
Basketball	Cross Country
Cross Country	Curling
Curling	Golf
Football	Ice Hockey
Golf	Soccer
Ice Hockey	Softball
Soccer	Track and field
Track and field	Volleyball
Volleyball	

=== Women's basketball ===
The Windsor Lancers women's basketball program is led by Head Coach Chantal Vallée, a native of Montreal, who has become one of the top women's basketball programs in the country, having captured five straight CIS national titles in 2011, 2012, 2013, 2014, and 2015.

The team has achieved some notable performances, such as in the 2008–09 season, when the team set a 21-1 record, their first-ever OUA Provincial Championship title. In 2010–11, the Lancers won their first-ever CIS National Championship title in the program's 50th year. With a 20–2 regular season record. With the win, the Lancers became the first host school to ever win a CIS national championship title in women's basketball at home and were also the first team outside of the Canada West Conference to win the Bronze Baby Trophy in the last 19 years.

In 2011–12, Coach Vallée and the Lancer women's basketball team captured their second straight CIS national title, while in 2012–13, Vallée's squad made program history as they completed an undefeated regular season with a 21–0 record and the No. 1 ranking in Canada. In 2013–14, Coach Vallée led her team to a fourth straight CIS national championship title, winning at home for the second time in four years.

=== Football ===
The Windsor Lancers football team began competing in the Central Canada Intercollegiate Football Conference in 1968 and has continued to play uninterrupted since then. The team plays on Alumni Field out of University of Windsor Stadium, located on the campus grounds at the University of Windsor. The program is notable for featuring three Hec Crighton Trophy winners, most recently being former Canadian Football League running back, Daryl Stephenson, when he won the award in 2006. The Hec Crighton Trophy was also claimed by Andrew Parici in 1972, becoming just the second quarterback to win the award, and Scott Mallender, also at quarterback, in 1979. The football team itself has won a Yates Cup championship in 1975.

=== Track and field ===
The Lancers are the most successful track and field program in Canadian Inter-University Sport history. Led by head coach Dennis Fairall, the Lancers have captured 25 Canadian university cross country and track and field championships (20 track and field, 5 cross country), in addition to the 46 Ontario University championships (39 track and field, 7 cross country).

In his 29 seasons at the helm of the program, Coach Fairall has been honoured 65 times as either the CIS national coach of the year or the OUA Provincial Coach of the Year in Track and Field and Cross Country. As of 2015–16, the Lancers have won 23 of the past 25 OUA provincial championships in men's track and field, and 17 of the past 25 OUA provincial championships in women's track and field.

The Lancer track and field program has featured several high-profile athletes over the years, including national standouts O'Brien Gibbons, Andrea Steen, Mike Nolan, Ryan McKenzie, and, most recently Melissa Bishop. Bishop, who is still coached by Dennis Fairall, won a gold medal at the 2015 Pan Am Games in Toronto, Ontario. She also set a new Canadian record in the 800 metres in the summer of 2015 while also capturing a silver medal at the 2015 IAAF World Championships in Beijing, China.

== Awards and honours ==
=== Athletes of the Year ===
This is an incomplete list.

Year	Femmale athlete	Sport	Male athlete	Sport
2016–17	Krystin Lawrence	Ice hockey	Corey Bellemore	Cross country
2017–18	Kelsey Balkwill	Track and field	John Moate	Volleyball
2018–19	Carly Steer	Basketball	Pierce Johnson	Volleyball
2019–20	Alyssa Getty	Golf	Pierce Johnson	Volleyball
2020–21	Cancelled due to the COVID-19 pandemic.			

=== National awards ===
- Jessica Clemencon, Basketball, 2011 BLG Awards
- Korissa Williams, Basketball, 2015 BLG Awards
