= Ontario University Athletics =

Governing body for university sport in Ontario

- Association: U Sports
- No. of teams: 20
- Headquarters: Burlington, Ontario
- Region: Ontario
- Website: oua.ca

Ontario University Athletics (OUA; French: Sports universitaires de l'Ontario) is a regional membership association for Canadian universities which assists in co-ordinating competition between their university level athletic programs and providing contact information, schedules, results, and releases about those programs and events to the public and the media. This is similar to what would be called a college athletic conference in the United States. OUA, which covers Ontario, is one of four such bodies that are members of the country's governing body for university athletics, U Sports. The other three regional associations coordinating university-level sports in Canada are Atlantic University Sport (AUS), the Canada West Universities Athletic Association (CW), and Réseau du sport étudiant du Québec (RSEQ).

OUA came into being in 1997 with the merger of the Ontario Universities Athletics Association and the Ontario Women's Intercollegiate Athletics Association.

== History ==
The first formal organization of intercollegiate athletics in Canada took place in 1906 with the formation of the Canadian Interuniversity Athletic Union (CIAU). This organization had four active members: Ottawa College, Trinity College, McMaster College and the Royal Military College. As the years passed, the CIAU expanded until in 1954 the union had nineteen members.

In 1954, the administration of the CIAU was becoming somewhat unwieldy. There was a great variation in the standards of play between institutions, a different philosophy towards athletics between many members and difficulties in agreeing upon common standards of eligibility. It was also felt that the name Canadian Intercollegiate Athletic Union was not truly appropriate since intercollegiate athletic associations were also in existence in other parts of the country. In 1955, it was agreed by the member institutions that the CIAU (Central Division as it was then called) would reorganize in two sections to be known as the Ontario-Quebec Athletic Association (with nine members) and the Ottawa-St. Lawrence Intercollegiate Association (with ten members).

The original members of the O-QAA had been joined by the Assumption College (University of Windsor) and were joined in 1961 by Waterloo and 1968 by Carleton University and the University of Ottawa. In 1968, the O-QAA was divided into Eastern and Western Divisions in order to facilitate the scheduling of events. The 1960s also saw the creation of Canada's first national governing body for university athletics, the Canadian Intercollegiate Athletic Union (also CIAU), in 1961.

In 1971, the Quebec-based universities in the O-QAA withdrew from the Association. Laval, McGill and Montreal elected to pursue their future athletic endeavours in the newly formed Quebec Universities Athletic Association.

In the resulting reorganization meetings, the remaining members of the O-QAA (Carleton University, University of Guelph, McMaster University, University of Ottawa, Queen's University, University of Toronto, University of Waterloo, University of Western Ontario and University of Windsor) voted to change their name to the OUAA (Ontario Universities Athletic Association). Invitations were extended to all Ontario universities to participate in the reorganization meeting.

As part of the reorganization, it was decided that all the trophies, records, etc. of the O-QAA would remain with and be recognized by the OUAA.

The Ontario Women's Interuniversity Athletic Association was founded in 1971, which provided athletic competition for women students in the universities of Ontario. The OWIAA was unique in North America in both its longevity and singleness of purpose. Formed by the amalgamation of the Women's Intercollegiate Athletic Union (WIAU), which was founded in 1923 and the Ontario-Quebec Women's Conference of Intercollegiate Athletics (O-QWCIA), the OWIAA continued the heritage of 50 years of women's interuniversity competition. This coalition was the only association for women's athletics to have survived through 60 years of commitment to women athletes in Ontario universities.

In the spring of 1972, the following institutions were admitted as full members of the OUAA: Brock University, Laurentian University, Ryerson Polytechnical Institute (now Toronto Metropolitan University), Trent University, Waterloo Lutheran University and York University.

The Royal Military College of Kingston was admitted to the OUAA in 1973. Also in 1973, Waterloo Lutheran University changed its name to Wilfrid Laurier University. The continuing evolution of the OUAA saw three Quebec-based universities (Bishop's, Loyola (now Concordia) and McGill) receive "playing privileges" in the OUAA football league in 1974.

In October 1975, the Canadian Interuniversity Athletics Union (CIAU) suspended the Windsor Lancers from all sports for two years, for the use of an ineligible men's football player. Some older universities in the OUAA suggested withdrawing from the CIAU, which had different player eligibility rules. Bob Barney of the University of Western Ontario, felt that the CIAU made a "play for real power over athletics in this country". In May 1976, the Windsor Star reported that Barney proposed realignment of schools at the 1976 OUAA general meeting, which "would bring together universities with similar philosophies towards athletics".

In 1980, football was reorganized so that the teams of the Ontario-Quebec Intercollegiate Football Conference- West Division would form the new OUAA Football League. The OQIFC East teams: Ottawa, Carleton and Queen's would join the three Quebec schools in the new OQIFC. In 1987, the OUAA awarded playing privileges in hockey to three Quebec schools, McGill, Concordia and Trois Rivieres.

In 1988, Lakehead University was admitted to full membership while McGill, Concordia and Bishop's were granted playing privileges in basketball due to the folding of the Quebec Universities Athletic Association.

Nipissing University was admitted in 1993 with full membership.

July 1, 1997 marked a new era of university sport in Ontario. Both the OUAA and the OWIAA amalgamated to form one association, Ontario University Athletics. In November 1997, the OUA hired the organization's first executive director. The "new" OUA office opened on September 1, 1998, in Hamilton.

In 2001, the Queen's Golden Gaels and the Ottawa Gee Gees football teams rejoined the OUA from the OQIFC, expanding the OUA Football Conference to ten teams. In that same year, the CIAU changed its name to Canadian Interuniversity Sport (CIS).

The 2004–05 season saw Royal Military College enter completely into the OUA. In the past, the Kingston school had competed in both the OUA and OCAA, but withdrew from OCAA competition entirely.

In January 2006, the OUA welcomed its 19th member to the fold as UOIT was granted membership in a unanimous vote by the league's board of directors. The Oshawa-based school began competition in the 2006–07 season, participating in rowing and tennis, while joining men's and women's hockey in 2007–08.

In March 2012, Algoma announced that they would be joining the OUA in 2013.

In October 2016, CIS changed its name to U Sports.

== Member schools ==
=== Stadia and locations ===
Locations of the northern Ontario University Athletics member institutions
Locations of the southern Ontario University Athletics member institutions

=== Current members ===
| Institution | Location (Note: All cities are located in the Province of Ontario.) | Founded | Type | Enrollment | Endowment | Nickname | Joined (Note: Represents the calendar year when fall sports competition begins.) | Division |
|---|---|---|---|---|---|---|---|---|
| **Algoma University** | Sault Ste. Marie | 1967 | Public | 1,300 | --- | Thunderbirds | 2013 | East |
| **Brock University** | St. Catharines | 1964 | Public | 17,000 | $93.7M | Badgers | 1972 | West |
| **Carleton University** | Ottawa | 1942 | Public | 20,901 | $230M | Ravens | 1968 | East |
| **University of Guelph** | Guelph | 1964 | Public | 19,408 | $164.2M | Gryphons | 1955 | West |
| **Lakehead University** | Thunder Bay | 1946 | Public | 8,050 | $32.1M | Thunderwolves | 1988 | West |
| **Laurentian University** | Sudbury | 1960 | Public | 7,758 | $143M | Voyageurs | 1972 | East |
| **McMaster University** | Hamilton | 1887 | Public | 25,688 | $498.5M | Marauders | 1955 | West |
| **Nipissing University** | North Bay | 1909 | Public | 6,300 | $12M | Lakers | 1993 | East |
| **Ontario Tech University** | Oshawa | 2002 | Public | 11,050 | $23.8M | Ridgebacks | 2006 | East |
| **University of Ottawa** | Ottawa | 1848 | Public | 42,027 | $183.9M | Gee-Gees | 1968 | East |
| **Queen's University** | Kingston | 1841 | Public | 20,566 | $1.085B | Gaels | 1955 | East |
| **Royal Military College of Canada** (RMC) | Kingston | 1876 | Public | 1,268 | --- | Paladins | 1973 | East |
| **Toronto Metropolitan University** (TMU) | Toronto | 1948 | Public | 32,670 | $125.8M | Bold | 1972 | East |
| **University of Toronto** | Toronto | 1827 | Public | 73,185 | $2.38B | Varsity Blues | 1955 | East |
| **Trent University** | Peterborough | 1964 | Public | 7,160 | $21.2M | Excalibur | 1972 | East |
| **University of Waterloo** | Waterloo | 1957 | Public | 27,978 | $172M | Warriors | 1961 | West |
| **University of Western Ontario** | London | 1878 | Public | 30,000 | $266.6M | Mustangs | 1955 | West |
| **Wilfrid Laurier University** | Waterloo | 1911 | Public | 12,394 | --- | Golden Hawks | 1972 | West |
| **University of Windsor** | Windsor | 1857 | Public | 13,496 | $32.5M | Lancers | 1961 | West |
| **York University** | Toronto | 1959 | Public | 42,400 | $306M | Lions | 1972 | East |

=== Membership timeline ===
Full member (non-football)

== Sports ==
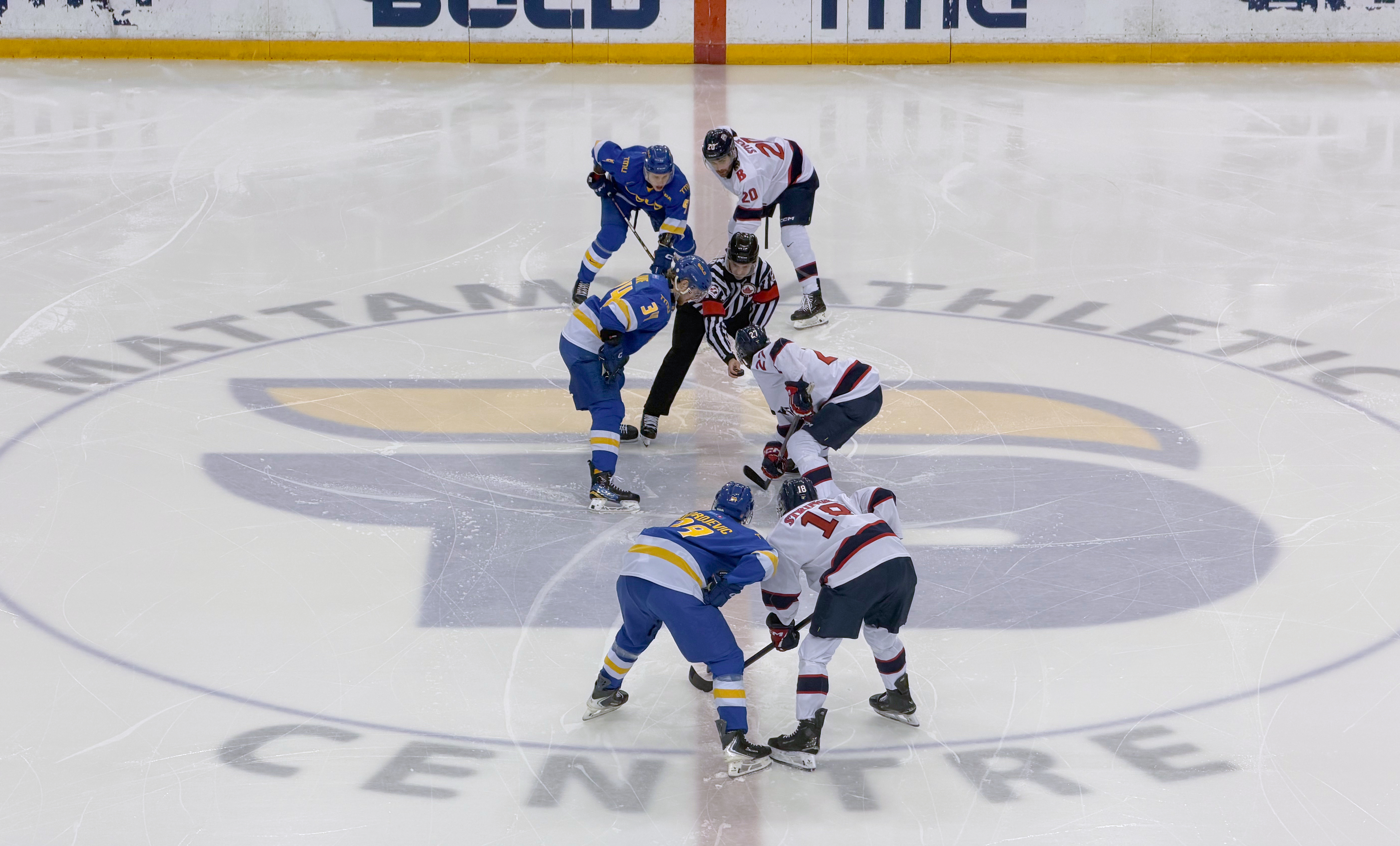
The TMU Bold face off against the Brock Badgers in the 2026 Queen's Cup quarterfinals (February 25, 2026).

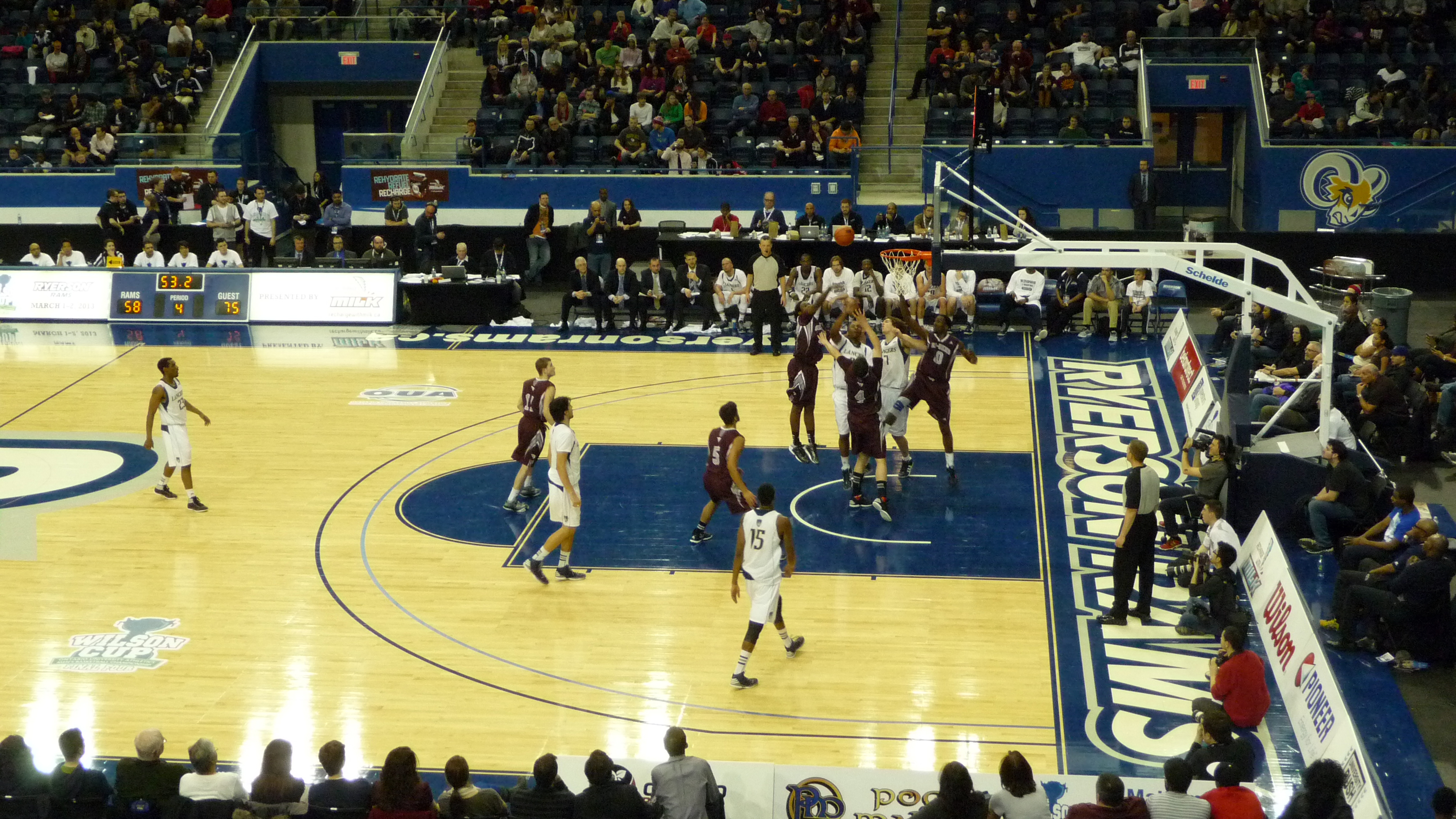
The Ottawa Gee Gees taking on the Windsor Lancers at the 2013 Wilson Cup semi final.

Member Universities of the OUA compete in a variety of sports at both the varsity and club levels.

Conference sports
| Sport | Men's | Women's |
|---|---|---|
| Badminton | ✓ | ✓ |
| Baseball | ✓ | |
| Basketball | ✓ | ✓ |
| Cross country | ✓ | ✓ |
| Curling | ✓ | ✓ |
| Fencing | ✓ | ✓ |
| Field hockey | | ✓ |
| Figure Skating | ✓ | ✓ |
| Football | ✓ | |
| Golf | ✓ | ✓ |
| Ice Hockey | ✓ | ✓ |
| Lacrosse | | ✓ |
| Nordic Skiing | ✓ | ✓ |
| Rowing | ✓ | ✓ |
| Rugby | ✓ | ✓ |
| Soccer | ✓ | ✓ |
| Squash | ✓ | ✓ |
| Swimming | ✓ | ✓ |
| Tennis | ✓ | ✓ |
| Track and field (indoor) | ✓ | ✓ |
| Volleyball | ✓ | ✓ |
| Water Polo | ✓ | ✓ |
| Wrestling | ✓ | ✓ |

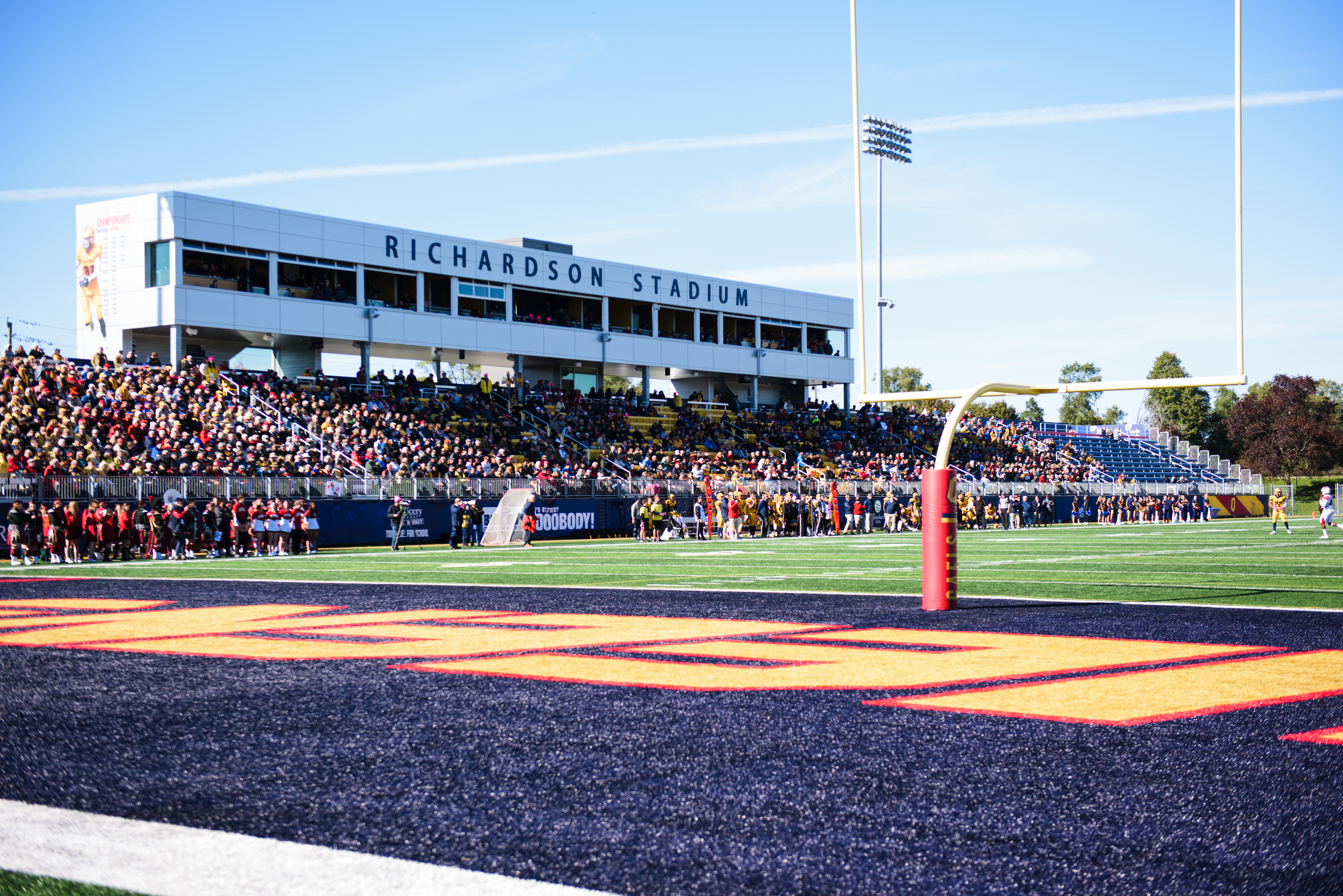
Richardson Stadium, home of Queen's Gaels Football and Men's and Women's Soccer

The OUA awards the Queen's Cup to its men's ice hockey champion, the Yates Cup to its men's football champion and the Wilson Cup to its men's basketball champion. Winners of OUA championships generally go on to compete in the national U Sports competition, against the champions of the other three conferences.

== Facilities ==
Canadian athletic facilities are often listed by their "maximum capacity", which is often an estimate of their largest recorded crowd in the facility. These maximum capacities can and often do include standing room patrons and attendees seated on grass surrounding a playing field. Seated Capacity is the actual number of permanent seats, be they grandstands or permanently in use bleachers. This is why you will sometimes see larger capacities listed for these sites when searching for them online. When capacity numbers have mismatched on source sites, unless the larger capacity could be confirmed as a seated capacity, the smaller capacity number has been listed here.

| Institution | Football Stadium | Seated Capacity | Basketball/Volleyball Gym | Seated Capacity | Hockey Arena | Seated Capacity | Soccer Stadium | Seated Capacity |
|---|---|---|---|---|---|---|---|---|
| Algoma | Non-football school | | George Leach Centre | -- | Non-hockey school | | Superior Heights Turf Field | -- |
| Brock | Non-football school | | Bob Davis Gymnasium | 2,400 | Seymour-Hannah Sports & Entertainment Centre | 1,400 | Brock Badgers Field | -- |
| Carleton | TAAG Park | 3,500 | Raven's Nest | 1,500 | Ice House | 500 | TAAG Park | 3,500 |
| Guelph | Alumni Stadium | 5,100 | W.F. Mitchell Athletics Centre | 2,200 | Gryphon Centre Arena | 1,400 | Gryphon Soccer Complex | 1,000 |
| Lakehead | Non-football school | | C.J. Sanders Fieldhouse | 2,000 | Fort William Gardens | 4,680 | Non-soccer school | |
| Laurentian | Non-football school | | Ben F. Avery Gymnasium | 1,200 | Countryside Sports Complex | 5,100 | Laurentian University Soccer Field | 500 |
| Laurier | University Stadium | 6,000 | Athletic Complex | 2,500 | Waterloo Recreation Complex | 3,400 | University Stadium | 6,000 |
| McMaster | Ron Joyce Stadium | 6,000 | Burridge Gymnasium | 2,250 | Non-hockey school | | Ron Joyce Stadium | 6,000 |
| Nipissing | Non-football school | | Robert J. Surtees Athletic Centre | -- | Memorial Gardens | 4,025 | Nipissing University Turf Field | 600 |
| Ontario Tech | Non-football school | | Campus Recreation & Wellness Centre | 2,000 | UOIT Campus Ice Centre | 550 | Vaso's Field | 1,000 |
| Ottawa | Gee-Gees Field | 4,152 | Montpetit Hall | 1,000 | Minto Sports Complex | 850 | Matt Anthony Field-W | 1,500 |
| Queen's | Richardson Stadium | 8,000+ | Athletics & Recreation Centre | 3,000 | Kingston Memorial Centre | 3,300 | Richardson Stadium | 8,000+ |
| RMC | Non-football school | | Kingston Military Community Sports Centre (Volleyball Only) | 4,000 | Constantine Arena | 1,500 | Navy Bay Soccer and Rugby Fields | 2,500 |
| Toronto | Varsity Stadium | 5,000 | Goldring Centre | 2,000 | Varsity Arena | 4,116 | Varsity Stadium | 5,000 |
| Toronto Metropolitan | Non-football school | | Mattamy Athletic Centre | 1,000 | Mattamy Home Ice | 2,796 | Downsview Park Sports Centre | |
| Trent | Non-football school | | Trent University Athletic Center (Volleyball Only) | 619+ | Non-hockey school | | Justin Chiu Stadium | 1,000 |
| Waterloo | Warrior Field | 5,400 | Physical Activities Complex | 4,500 | Columbia Ice Field | 1,000 | Warrior Field | 5,400 |
| Western | Western Alumni Stadium | 8,000 | Alumni Hall | 2,400 | Thompson Arena | 3,615 | Western Alumni Stadium | 10,000 |
| Windsor | University of Windsor Stadium | 2,000 | St. Denis Centre | 2,000 | Windsor Arena-M; South Windsor Arena-W | 4,600; 1,000 | University of Windsor Stadium | 2,000 |
| York | York Lions Stadium | 2,000 | Tait McKenzie Centre | 1,200 | Canlan Ice Sports | 1,700 | York Lions Stadium | 2,000 |

(Data mined from the U Sports homepage's member directory and WorldStadiums.com. The members directory numbers seem to be ballpark figures in some cases.)

== See also ==
- Windsor Lancers Rugby
