= TAAG Park =

Stadium in Ottawa, Ontario, Canada

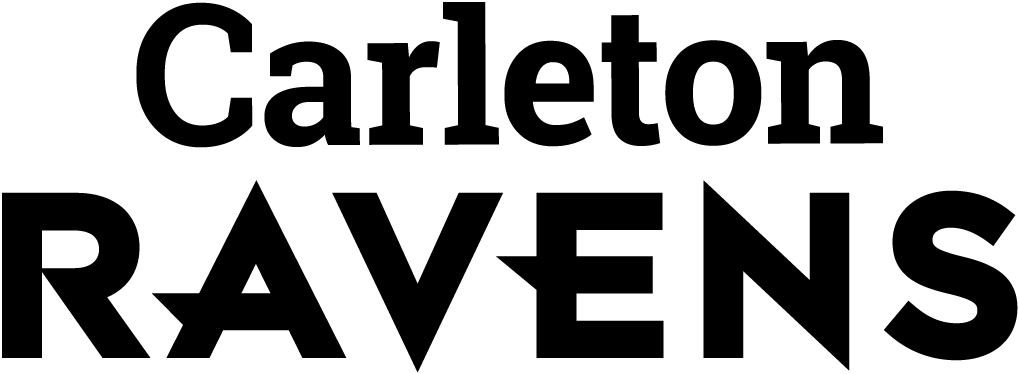

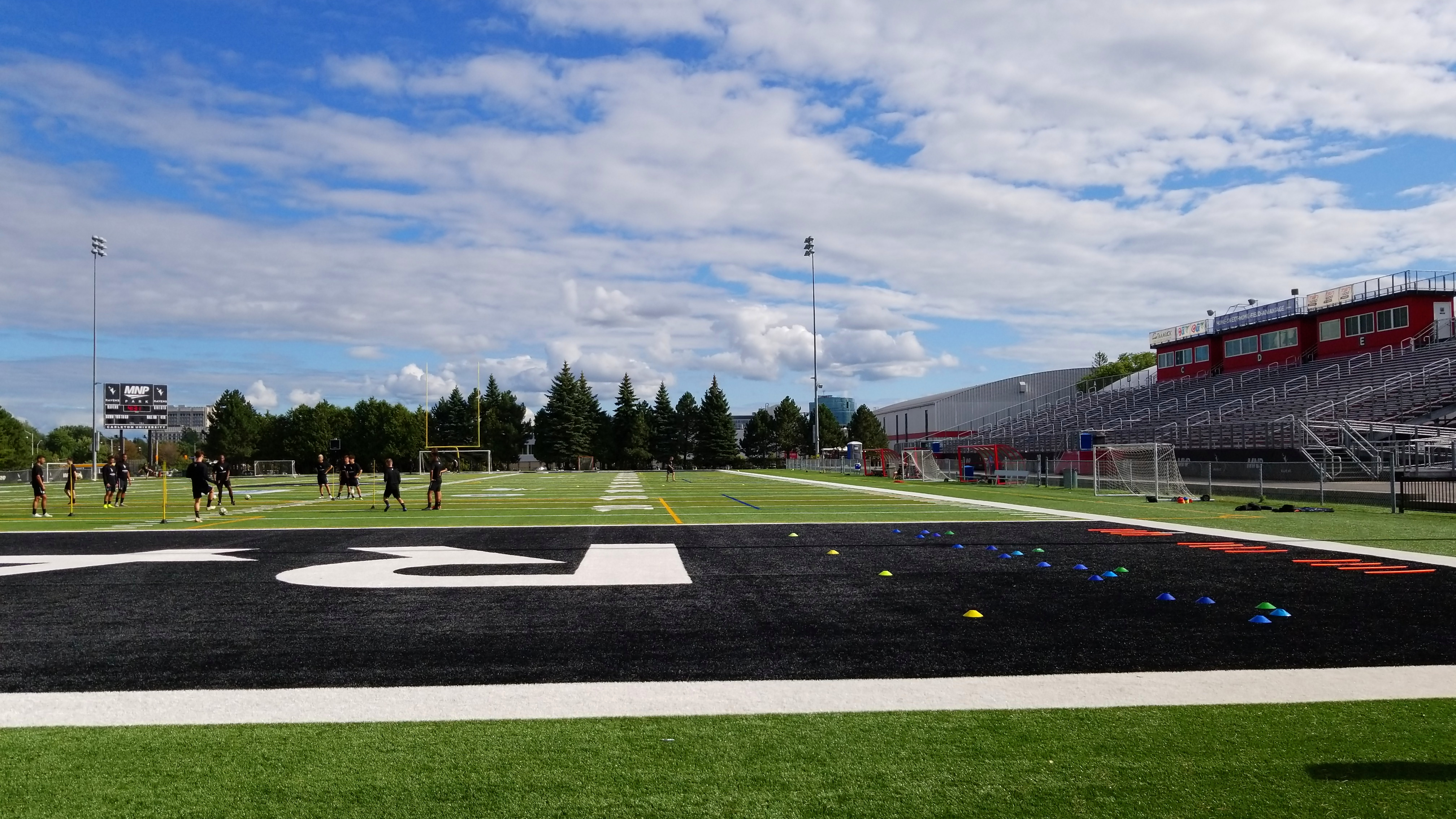
- View of the stadium in 2019
- Interactive map of TAAG Park
- Former names: Raven Field (1998); Keith Harris Stadium (1998–2015); MNP Park (2015-2020); Ravens' Perch (2020-2022)
- Address: 1125 Colonel By Drive; Ottawa, Ontario; Canadas
- Coordinates: 45°23′19″N 75°41′39″W
- Owner: Carleton University
- Capacity: 3,044 (max 3,500 with standing room)
- Type: Stadium
- Surface: FieldTurf
- Current use: Football; Soccer; Rugby union

Tenants
- Carleton Ravens (U Sports) (1998–present); Ottawa Sooners (CJFL, QJFL) (1998–present); Ottawa Fury (PDL) (2005–2007); Ottawa Wolves RFC (ORU) (2008–2010); Ottawa Fury FC (NASL) (2014); Ottawa Outlaws (AUDL) (2015–2016, 2018–2022); Ottawa South United (L1Q) (2023-present)

Website
- athletics.carleton.ca/turf-fields

TAAG Park is a stadium located on the Carleton University campus in Ottawa, Ontario, Canada. Known as Raven Field until 1998 when it became known as Keith Harris Stadium. Keith Harris served as the Director of Carleton Athletics for over 30 years and was inducted into its Hall of Fame in 2000. In 2011, the Carleton Board of Governors approved a plan for the expansion and renovation of the stadium. The stadium was renamed TAAG Park in August 2022.

The stadium is home to Carleton University Ravens varsity football team, men's and women's varsity soccer teams and women's rugby team.

The stadium, supplied and installed by Sport Systems Canada Inc, has a seating capacity of 3,044, plus room for approximately 500 spectators on the "Perch", a hill on the east side of the stadium often used by students, for a total capacity of 3,500. Also, there are three state of the art press boxes complete with viewing platforms.

== Previous tenants ==
It was also home to the Ottawa Fury FC soccer club. During the 2008 season, it also became the home field for the Ottawa Sooners football club. In 2010, the Ottawa Invaders called Keith Harris home as they join the Northern Football Conference.

On October 11, 2013, the Ottawa Fury FC announced that the club had reached an agreement with Carleton University to stage its 2014 North American Soccer League (NASL) spring season games at Keith Harris Stadium. The agreement with Carleton University allowed the Ottawa Fury FC to play all five home games of the nine-game 2014 NASL spring season at Carleton while construction of the team's permanent home stadium at Lansdowne Park completed in time for the fall season.
