= Western Alumni Stadium =

Football stadium in London, Ontario, Canada

Coordinates: 42°59′59.50″N 81°16′25.61″W

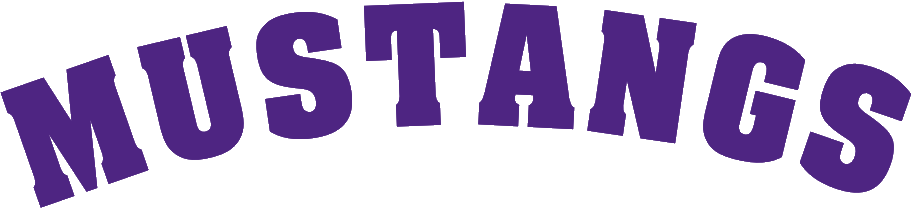

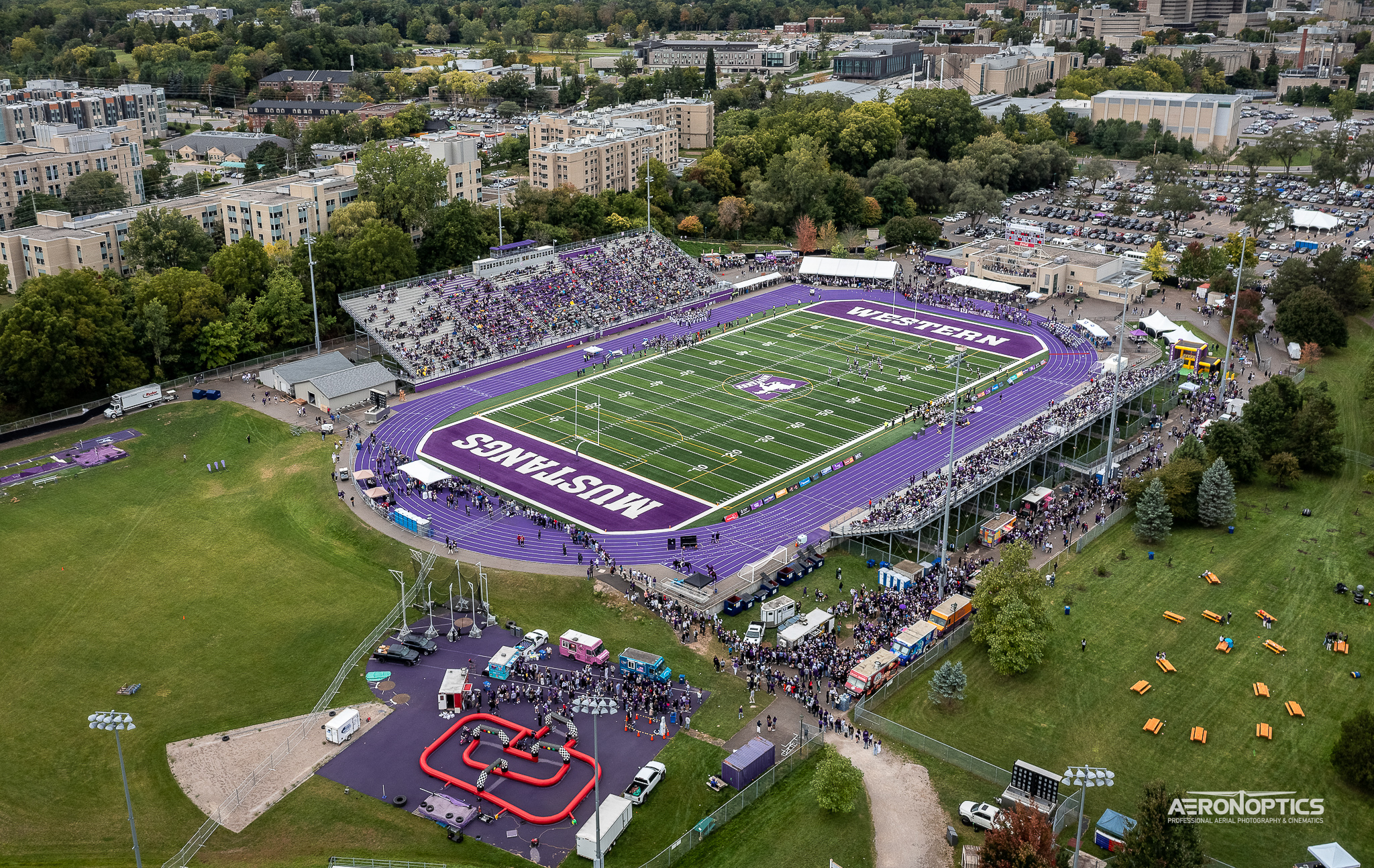
- Aerial view of the stadium in 2023
- Interactive map of Western Alumni Stadium
- Former names: TD Stadium; TD Waterhouse Stadium
- Address: London, Ontario; Canada
- Owner: University of Western Ontario
- Operator: University of Western Ontario Athletics
- Capacity: 8,000 seats Standing room 11,000
- Type: Stadium
- Surface: FieldTurf
- Scoreboard: Yes
- Current use: Football; Soccer

Construction
- Groundbreaking: September 28, 1999
- Opened: September 16, 2000
- Renovated: 2007
- Cost: $10.5 million
- Architect: Stantec Consulting Ltd.
- Main contractor: Norlon Builders London Ltd.

Tenants
- Western Mustangs (U Sports): 2000–present FC London (USL PDL): 2009–2013; London Beefeaters (CJFL) 2000–2019; London Silverbacks (NAFL): 2004–2008

Website
- westernmustangs.ca/alumni-stadium

Western Alumni Stadium (formerly TD Stadium) is an 8,000-seat Canadian football stadium located on the campus of the University of Western Ontario in London, Ontario. It is home to the Western Mustangs football and soccer teams and is one of the largest stadiums in the OUA provincial conference. It was built in 2000 at a cost of approximately $10.65 million by Norlon Builders London Ltd and designed by Stantec Consulting Ltd.

The stadium was built as a replacement for the former JW Little Stadium, which held its last game in 1999 before demolition. JW Little Stadium had been on Western's campus since 1929. The stadium was opened on September 16, 2000, when the first Western Mustangs home game was played.

During the request for sponsorship funding, the Canadian-owned bank TD Canada Trust gave $1.5 million towards the stadium construction. Originally named the TD Waterhouse Stadium, the name was changed in 2013 to reflect new branding for TD and then changed to its current name in 2021 after a donation of $1.4 million was given by the Alumni Association.

In addition to the Western Mustangs, the stadium was also home to the London Beefeaters of the Canadian Junior Football League from 2001 to 2019.

In spring 2009, the newly formed FC London of the USL Premier Development League began playing their home games at this venue.

== Facility ==
The stadium has a regulation CFL Canadian football sized field (110 yards by 65 yards) made out of FieldTurf. Surrounding the field is an 8-lane, 400-metre Mondo rubber track. The seating has two separate grandstands with a total capacity for 8,000. During large games, the stadium can accommodate 11,000 additional standing spectators.

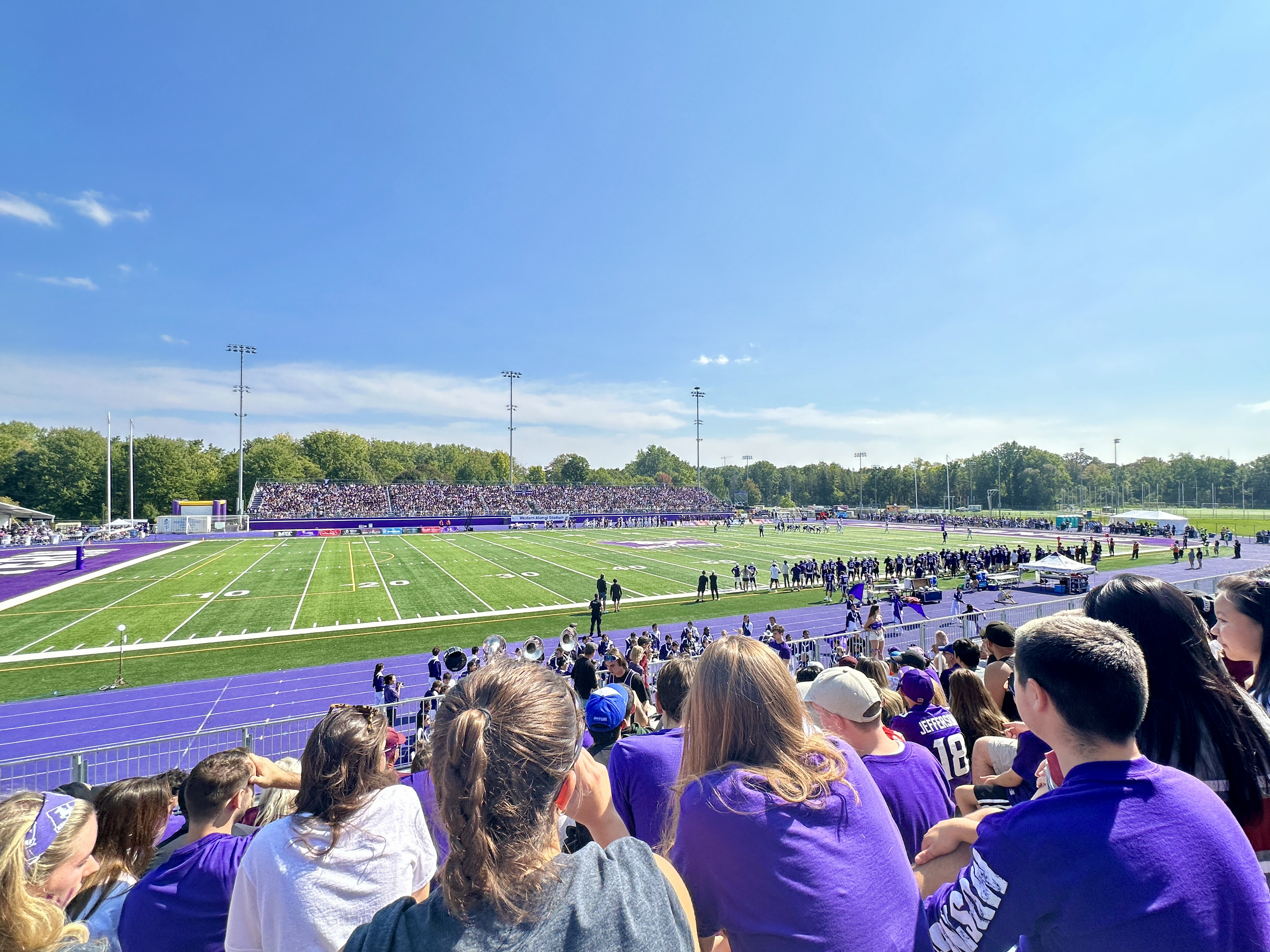
Inside Western Alumni Stadium in 2023

In addition to the track, the facility also as multiple long jump sand pits, javelin and a discus circle.

The main building is known as the JW Little building and houses the players changing rooms, the Michael Kirkley Training Centre, coaching offices, as well as a lounge and terrace.

=== Renovations ===
In summer 2007, the AstroTurf was replaced by FieldTurf at a cost of approximately $1 million.

The stadium field and track underwent renovations in summer 2021 to replace the track surface and the artificial FieldTurf. Along with those playing surfaces, the stadium lights were upgraded to facilitate better visibility during night games. The budgeted cost for this project was $4.6 million.

== Notable events ==
The stadium hosts a number of events outside of the university. Every year, local London public schools through the Thames Valley School Board use the facilities often to host track and field events. The stadium also hosts local London high school football games known as Red Feather games, in which local senior high school football teams play their first game of the season.

The stadium was used as the main venue for the 2001 Canada Summer Games.

In 2002, the stadium was used for an exhibition CFL game between the Toronto Argonauts and Hamilton Tiger-Cats which was a sellout at 9,178 fans.

The stadium was the host of the 2004 Men's Pan American Cup for the men's international field hockey championship.

In 2006, the stadium hosted the 2006 World Lacrosse Championship and the game attendance was 7,735.

London hosted the 2010 Canadian Special Olympics and the stadium became one of a number of venues across the city.

In the summer of 2018, the stadium was the main venue for the 2018 Ontario Summer Games. The stadium is again the main venue for the 2021 Ontario Summer Games, being held in London for the second time in a row.
