= 2020 Calgary Stampeders season =

Canadian football team season

- The Stampeders' 75th-anniversary season logo.
- Owner: Calgary Sports and Entertainment
- General manager: John Hufnagel
- President: John Hufnagel
- Head coach: Dave Dickenson
- Home stadium: McMahon Stadium

Results
- Record: N/A
- Division place: N/A, West
- Playoffs: Season cancelled

The 2020 Calgary Stampeders season was scheduled to be the 63rd season for the team in the Canadian Football League (CFL) and their 76th overall. Training camps, pre-season games, and regular season games were initially postponed due to the COVID-19 pandemic in Alberta. The CFL announced on April 7, 2020 that the start of the 2020 season would not occur before July 2020. On May 20, 2020, it was announced that the league would likely not begin regular season play prior to September 2020. On August 17, 2020 however, the season was officially cancelled due to COVID-19.

This season would have been Dave Dickenson's fifth season as head coach and John Hufnagel's 13th season as general manager. The team had planned to celebrate the 75th anniversary of the team's inception in 1945.

== CFL national draft ==
The 2020 CFL National Draft took place on April 30, 2020. The Stampeders obtained the first overall pick after completing a trade with the Ottawa Redblacks that saw the teams swap first-round picks and Calgary acquire another third-round pick following the trade and subsequent re-signing of Nick Arbuckle to the Redblacks. However, shortly after the draft began, the Stampeders then traded the first and 15th overall picks to the BC Lions for the third and 12th overall picks.

The Stampeders also traded their fifth-round selection and Justin Renfrow to BC in exchange for a fourth-round pick in this year's draft and a negotiation list player.

Round	Pick	Player	Position	University team	Hometown
1	3	Isaac Adeyemi-Berglund	DL	Southeastern Louisiana	Dartmouth, NS
2	12	Trivel Pinto	WR	British Columbia	Toronto, ON
3	21	Rysen John	WR	Simon Fraser	Vancouver, BC
3	26	Jonathan Zamora	OL	St. Francis Xavier	Toronto, ON
4	31	Kurtis Gray	LB	Waterloo	Waterloo, ON
4	34	Tyson Middlemost	WR	McMaster	Dundas, ON
6	52	Andrew Seinet-Spaulding	OL	McGill	Montreal, QC
7	61	Kieran Burnham	K	St. Francis Xavier	Cambridge, ON
8	70	Michael Asibuo	CB	Concordia	LaSalle, QC

=== CFL global draft ===
The 2020 CFL global draft was scheduled to take place on April 16, 2020. However, due to the COVID-19 pandemic, this draft and its accompanying combine were postponed to occur just before the start of training camp, which was ultimately cancelled. The Stampeders were scheduled to select sixth in each round with the number of rounds never announced.

== Planned schedule ==
=== Preseason ===
Week	Game	Date	Kickoff	Opponent	TV	Venue
A	Bye					
B	1	Sat, May 30	2:00 p.m. MDT	vs. Saskatchewan Roughriders	NA	McMahon Stadium
C	2	Fri, June 5	8:00 p.m. MDT	at BC Lions	NA	BC Place

=== Regular season ===
Week	Game	Date	Kickoff	Opponent	TV	Venue
1	1	Fri, June 12	8:00 p.m. MDT	vs. Montreal Alouettes	TSN/RDS	McMahon Stadium
2	2	Thu, June 18	7:00 p.m. MDT	vs. BC Lions	TSN	McMahon Stadium
3	3	Fri, June 26	6:30 p.m. MDT	at Winnipeg Blue Bombers	TSN	IG Field
4	4	Sat, July 4	5:00 p.m. MDT	at Toronto Argonauts	TSN	BMO Field
5	5	Fri, July 10	5:30 p.m. MDT	at Hamilton Tiger-Cats	TSN	Tim Hortons Field
6	6	Fri, July 17	5:00 p.m. MDT	at Montreal Alouettes	TSN/RDS	Molson Stadium
7	7	Sat, July 25	5:00 p.m. MDT	vs. Hamilton Tiger-Cats	TSN	McMahon Stadium
8	Bye					
9	8	Sat, Aug 8	5:00 p.m. MDT	vs. Toronto Argonauts	TSN	McMahon Stadium
10	9	Sat, Aug 15	8:00 p.m. MDT	at BC Lions	TSN	BC Place
11	10	Thu, Aug 20	7:00 p.m. MDT	vs. Winnipeg Blue Bombers	TSN	McMahon Stadium
12	Bye					
13	11	Mon, Sept 7	2:30 p.m. MDT	vs. Edmonton Football Team	TSN	McMahon Stadium
14	12	Sat, Sept 12	5:00 p.m. MDT	at Edmonton Football Team	TSN	Commonwealth Stadium
15	13	Fri, Sept 18	8:00 p.m. MDT	at Saskatchewan Roughriders	TSN	Mosaic Stadium
16	14	Fri, Sept 25	7:30 p.m. MDT	vs. Winnipeg Blue Bombers	TSN	McMahon Stadium
17	Bye					
18	15	Sat, Oct 10	5:00 p.m. MDT	at BC Lions	TSN	BC Place
19	16	Fri, Oct 16	7:00 p.m. MDT	vs. Ottawa Redblacks	TSN	McMahon Stadium
20	17	Fri, Oct 23	5:00 p.m. MDT	at Ottawa Redblacks	TSN	TD Place Stadium
21	18	Fri, Oct 30	7:30 p.m. MDT	vs. Saskatchewan Roughriders	TSN	McMahon Stadium

== Team ==
=== Roster ===
Calgary Stampeders roster
**Quarterbacks**: 12 Montell Cozart; -- Jake Maier; -- Marcus McMaryion; 19 Bo Levi Mitchell; 15 Dakota Prukop; **Receivers**: 17 Markeith Ambles; -- Dorian Baker; -- Shawn Bane; 83 Josh Huff; 89 Colton Hunchak; 88 Kamar Jorden; 81 Michael Klukas; 1 Hergy Mayala; -- Dorren Miller; 80 Aaron Peck; -- James Quick; -- Bernard Reedy; 4 Eric Rogers; 85 Andrés Salgado; 87 Richard Sindani; -- Fred Trevillon; -- Aaren Vaughns	**Running backs**: 35 Ka'Deem Carey; -- Russell Hansbrough; 34 Ante Milanovic-Litre; 35 Asnnel Robo; -- Roc Thomas; -- Brandon Wilds; **Fullbacks**: 44 Simon Gingras-Gagnon; 23 William Langlais; 46 Charlie Power; **Offensive linemen**: 60 Shane Bergman; 66 David Brown; -- D. J. Coker; 53 Brad Erdos; 65 Jaylan Guthrie; -- Leon Johnson; 62 Nila Kasitati; 68 Justin Lawrence; 51 Sean McEwen; 58 Ryan Sceviour; 61 Ucambre Williams; 67 Zack Williams	**Defensive linemen**: -- Stefan Banks; 92 Vincent Desjardins; 94 Da'Sean Downey; -- Jordan Harold; -- J. T. Jones; -- Lenny Jones; 41 Cordarro Law; -- Theo Majette; -- Connor McGough; -- Garrald McDowell; 98 Ese Mrabure-Ajufo; -- Dadi Nicolas; 90 Folarin Orimolade; -- Keyon Richardson; 56 Mike Rose; 99 Sterling Sheffield; -- Mbi Tanyi; 93 Jabar Westerman; 97 Derek Wiggan; **Linebackers**: 40 Nate Holley; -- Basil Jackson; -- Cory James; 52 Riley Jones; 48 Wynton McManis; 33 Eric Mezzalira; 42 Chase Middleton; -- Darnell Sankey; 47 Fraser Sopik; -- Jojo Tillery; -- Darrell Williams; -- Perry Young	**Defensive backs**: 0 Robertson Daniel; 8 Branden Dozier; -- Mitch Fettig; -- Javien Hamilton; 49 Lorenzo Jerome; -- Ashton Lampkin; -- Richard Leonard; 16 Royce Metchie; 27 Jonathan Moxey; -- Ramon Richards; -- Nick Statz; -- Malcolm Thompson; 29 Jamar Wall; -- Isaiah Wharton; -- Darius Williams; 21 Raheem Wilson; -- Evan Worthington; **Special teams**: 54 Pierre-Luc Caron LS; 30 Rene Paredes K; 11 Ronnie Pfeffer K; Italics indicate American player **Bold** indicates Global player Roster updated 2020-08-17; Depth Chart • Transactions; 93 Roster

=== Coaching staff ===
Calgary Stampeders staff
**Front office**: President and coo – Lyle Bauer; General manager – John Hufnagel; Assistant general manager of football operations – Michael Petrie; Director of canadian scouting – Brendan Mahoney; Director of U.S. Scouting – Cole Hufnagel; **Head coaches**: Head coach – Dave Dickenson; Assistant head coach – Mark Kilam; **Offensive coaches**: Offensive coordinator and offensive line – Pat DelMonaco; Quarterbacks – Marc Mueller; Running backs and offensive assistant – George Cortez; Receivers – Marquay McDaniel	**Defensive coaches**: Defensive coordinator – Brent Monson; Defensive line – Corey Mace; Linebackers – Dwayne Cameron; Defensive backs – Josh Bell; **Special teams coaches**: Special teams coordinator – Mark Kilam; Assistant special teams – Taylor Altilio; **Strength and conditioning**: Strength and conditioning – Keenan MacDougall; → Coaching staff
