= 2021 Calgary Stampeders season =

Canadian football team season

- Owner: Calgary Sports and Entertainment
- General manager: John Hufnagel
- President: John Hufnagel
- Head coach: Dave Dickenson
- Home stadium: McMahon Stadium

Results
- Record: 8–6
- Division place: 3rd, West
- Playoffs: Lost West Semi-Final
- Team MOP: Ka'Deem Carey
- Team MODP: Mike Rose
- Team MOC: Derek Wiggan
- Team MOOL: Sean McEwen
- Team MOST: Rene Paredes
- Team MOR: Isaac Adeyemi-Berglund

Uniform

The 2021 Calgary Stampeders season was the 63rd season for the team in the Canadian Football League (CFL) and their 76th overall. The Stampeders qualified for the playoffs for the 16th straight year following their week 15 victory over the BC Lions on November 12, 2021. However, the team lost the West Semi-Final in double overtime to the Saskatchewan Roughriders by a score of 33–30. The 2021 season was Dave Dickenson's fifth season as head coach and John Hufnagel's 13th season as general manager.

An 18-game season schedule was originally released on November 20, 2020, but it was announced on April 21, 2021, that the start of the season would likely be delayed until August and feature a 14-game schedule. On June 15, 2021, the league released the revised 14-game schedule with regular season play beginning on August 5, 2021.

== Offseason ==
=== CFL global draft ===
The 2021 CFL global draft took place on April 15, 2021. With the format being a snake draft, the Stampeders selected seventh in the odd-numbered rounds and third in the even-numbered rounds. The team exchanged their fourth-round pick for a third-round pick as part of a three-player trade with the Toronto Argonauts.

Round	Pick	Player	Position	University/Club Team	Nationality
1	7	Cody Grace	P	Arkansas State	Australia
2	12	Franklin Agbasimere	DL	Missouri	Nigeria
3	21	Aaron Donkor	LB	Arkansas State	Germany
3	25	Isaac Alarcón	OL	ITESEM	Mexico

== CFL national draft ==
The 2021 CFL draft took place on May 4, 2021. The Stampeders had six selections in the six-round snake draft and had the eighth pick in odd rounds and the second pick in even rounds. The team exchanged their sixth-round pick for a fifth-round pick as part of a three-player trade with the Toronto Argonauts.

Round	Pick	Player	Position	University Team	Hometown
1	8	Amen Ogbongbemiga	LB	Oklahoma State	Calgary, AB
2	11	Bryce Bell	OL	Wilfrid Laurier	Waterloo, ON
3	26	Charlie Moore	LB	Calgary	Delta, BC
4	29	Elliot Graham	LB	British Columbia	Hamilton, ON
5	43	Chuba Hubbard	RB	Oklahoma State	Sherwood Park, AB
5	44	Luther Hakunavanhu	WR	York	Edmonton, AB

== Preseason ==
Due to the shortening of the season, the CFL confirmed that pre-season games would not be played in 2021.

=== Planned schedule ===
Week	Game	Date	Kickoff	Opponent	TV	Venue
A	1	Sun, May 23	2:30 p.m. MDT	vs. BC Lions	NA	McMahon Stadium
B	2	Sat, May 29	2:00 p.m. MDT	at Edmonton Elks	NA	Commonwealth Stadium
C	Bye					

== Regular season ==
=== Standings ===
West Division
Team	GP	W	L	T	Pts	PF	PA	Div	Stk	
Winnipeg Blue Bombers	14	11	3	0	22	351	187	8–1	L2	Details
Saskatchewan Roughriders	14	9	5	0	18	290	285	5–4	L1	Details
Calgary Stampeders	14	8	6	0	16	315	263	6–4	W3	Details
BC Lions	14	5	9	0	10	313	351	2–7	W1	Details
Edmonton Elks	14	3	11	0	6	246	377	2–7	L1	Details

=== Schedule ===
The Stampeders initially had a schedule that featured 18 regular season games beginning on June 12 and ending on October 29. The team was scheduled to play in a neutral site game on July 10 with the Toronto Argonauts serving as the home team. However, due to the COVID-19 pandemic in Canada, the Canadian Football League delayed the start of the regular season to August 5, 2021, and the Stampeders began their 14-game season on August 7, 2021.

Week	Game	Date	Kickoff	Opponent	Results		TV	Venue	Attendance	Summary
Week	Game	Date	Kickoff	Opponent	Score	Record	TV	Venue	Attendance	Summary
1	1	Sat, Aug 7	5:00 p.m. MDT	Toronto Argonauts	L 20–23	0–1	TSN	McMahon Stadium	23,921	Recap
2	2	Thurs, Aug 12	7:30 p.m. MDT	BC Lions	L 9–15	0–2	TSN/RDS2	McMahon Stadium	21,029	Recap
3	3	Fri, Aug 20	7:30 p.m. MDT	Montreal Alouettes	W 28–22	1–2	TSN/RDS	McMahon Stadium	21,199	Recap
4	4	Sun, Aug 29	5:00 p.m. MDT	@ Winnipeg Blue Bombers	L 16–18	1–3	TSN/RDS/ESPN2	IG Field	22,806	Recap
5	5	Mon, Sept 6	2:30 p.m. MDT	Edmonton Elks	L 20–32	1–4	TSN/ESPNews	McMahon Stadium	31,039	Recap
6	6	Sat, Sept 11	5:00 p.m. MDT	@ Edmonton Elks	W 32–16	2–4	TSN/RDS	Commonwealth Stadium	33,493	Recap
7	7	Fri, Sept 17	5:00 p.m. MDT	@ Hamilton Tiger-Cats	L 17–23	2–5	TSN/RDS	Tim Hortons Field	15,000	Recap
8	Bye									
9	8	Sat, Oct 2	5:00 p.m. MDT	Saskatchewan Roughriders	W 23–17	3–5	TSN	McMahon Stadium	25,516	Recap
10	9	Sat, Oct 9	5:00 p.m. MDT	@ Saskatchewan Roughriders	W 22–19	4–5	TSN	Mosaic Stadium	27,964	Recap
11	10	Sat, Oct 16	5:00 p.m. MDT	@ BC Lions	W 39–10	5–5	TSN	BC Place	12,500	Recap
12	11	Sat, Oct 23	7:45 p.m. MDT	Saskatchewan Roughriders	L 17–20	5–6	TSN	McMahon Stadium	21,672	Recap
13	12	Fri, Oct 29	5:00 p.m. MDT	@ Ottawa Redblacks	W 26–13	6–6	TSN	TD Place Stadium	15,280	Recap
14	Bye									
15	13	Fri, Nov 12	8:30 p.m. MST	@ BC Lions	W 33–23	7–6	TSN	BC Place	12,500	Recap
16	14	Sat, Nov 20	5:00 p.m. MST	Winnipeg Blue Bombers	W 13–12	8–6	TSN	McMahon Stadium	19,103	Recap

== Post-season ==
=== Schedule ===
Game	Date	Kickoff	Opponent	Results		TV	Venue	Attendance	Summary
Game	Date	Kickoff	Opponent	Score	Record	TV	Venue	Attendance	Summary
West Semi-Final	Sun, Nov 28	2:30 p.m. MST	@ Saskatchewan Roughriders	L 30–33 (OT)	0–1	TSN/RDS/ESPNews	Mosaic Stadium	24,001	Recap

== Roster ==
2021 Calgary Stampeders final roster
**Quarterbacks**: 12 Jake Maier; 19 Bo Levi Mitchell; **Running backs**: 35 Ka'Deem Carey; 37 Elliot Graham; 23 William Langlais; 34 Ante Milanovic-Litre; **Receivers**: 17 Markeith Ambles; 86 Reggie Begelton; 81 Luther Hakunavanhu; 89 Colton Hunchak; 88 Kamar Jorden; 1 Hergy Mayala; 84 Tyson Middlemost; 87 Richie Sindani	**Offensive linemen**: 66 Bryce Bell T; 69 Julian Good-Jones T; 68 Justin Lawrence G; 51 Sean McEwen C; 58 Ryan Sceviour G; 61 Ucambre Williams T; 67 Zack Williams G; **Defensive linemen**: 91 Isaac Adeyemi-Berglund DE; 95 Stefen Banks DE; 92 Vincent Desjardins DT; 40 Shawn Lemon DE; 90 Folarin Orimolade DE; 41 Mike Rose DT; 96 Andrew Seinet-Spaulding DT; 97 Derek Wiggan DT	**Linebackers**: 36 Cory Greenwood; 43 Charlie Moore; 53 Darnell Sankey; 47 Fraser Sopik; 44 Silas Stewart; 56 Jameer Thurman; **Defensive backs**: 8 DaShaun Amos; 3 Branden Dozier; 4 Richard Leonard; 27 Jonathan Moxey; 6 Tre Roberson; 29 Jamar Wall; 21 Raheem Wilson; **Special teams**: 52 Aaron Crawford LS; 24 Cody Grace P; 30 René Paredes K	**Practice roster**: 94 Misiona Aiolupotea-Pei DE; 49 Yurik Bethune DE; 70 Keiran Burnham P; 57 Randy Chevrier LS; 60 D. J. Coker G; 64 Carter Comeau T; 39 Brad Cowan LB; 33 Nick Holley WR; 25 D. J. Killings DB; 98 Chris Odom DE; 48 Justin Phillips LB; 85 Andrés Salgado WR; 93 Tracy Sprinkle DT; 42 Aca'Cedric Ware RB; 77 Ben Whiting LB/LS; 0 Kobe Williams DB	**Injured list**: 14 Shawn Bane WR; 26 Marcelis Branch DB; 7 Javien Elliott DB; 45 Kurtis Gray LB; 82 Malik Henry WR; 62 Nila Kasitati T; 20 Malcolm Lee DB; 31 Calvin McCarty FB; 54 Cassanova McKinzy DE; 16 Royce Metchie DB; 15 Michael O'Connor QB; 99 Jarrell Owens DT; 11 Ronnie Pfeffer K/P; 46 Charlie Power FB; 2 Nick Statz DB; 32 Roc Thomas RB; **Suspended list**: Franklin Agbasimere DE; Nico Leonard RB; Brandon Wilds RB
Italics indicate American player • **Bold** indicates Global player

== Coaching staff ==
Calgary Stampeders staff
Front office: President and general manager – John Hufnagel; Director of player personnel – Brendan Mahoney; Director of U.S. Scouting – Cole Hufnagel; Football administration director – Molly Campbell; Director of football operations – Nick Bojda; CFL draft coordinator – Dwayne Cameron; Head coaches: Head coach – Dave Dickenson; Assistant head coach – Mark Kilam; Offensive coaches: Offensive coordinator and offensive line – Pat DelMonaco; Quarterbacks and running backs – Marc Mueller; Receivers – Marquay McDaniel; Offensive assistant – T.J. Vernieri	Defensive coaches: Defensive coordinator and linebackers – Brent Monson; Defensive line – Corey Mace; Defensive backs – Dwayne Cameron; Defensive assistant – Bob Slowik; Special teams coaches: Special teams coordinator – Mark Kilam; Strength and conditioning: Strength and conditioning – Taylor Altilio; → Coaching staff
