= 2018 Calgary Stampeders season =

Canadian football team season

- Owner: Calgary Sports and Entertainment
- General manager: John Hufnagel
- President: John Hufnagel
- Head coach: Dave Dickenson
- Home stadium: McMahon Stadium

Results
- Record: 13–5
- Division place: 1st, West
- Playoffs: Won Grey Cup
- Team MOP: Bo Levi Mitchell
- Team MOC: Alex Singleton
- Team MOR: Tre Roberson

Uniform

The 2018 Calgary Stampeders season was the 61st season for the team in the Canadian Football League (CFL) and their 84th overall. The Stampeders qualified for the playoffs for the 14th straight year and finished in first place in the West Division for the third straight year. They also appeared in the Grey Cup for the third consecutive season, but after two championship losses, the Stampeders claimed victory in the 106th Grey Cup game, the franchise's eighth victory overall. This season was Dave Dickenson's third season as head coach and John Hufnagel's 11th season as general manager.

== Offseason ==
=== CFL draft ===
The 2018 CFL draft took place on May 3, 2018. By virtue of being a Grey Cup finalist, the Stampeders had the second-to-last selection in each of the eight rounds. The team upgraded their fourth-round pick after trading Charleston Hughes to the Hamilton Tiger-Cats. The team also acquired an additional pick in the fifth round from the Ottawa Redblacks in a trade for Drew Tate.

Round	Pick	Player	Position	School/Club team
1	8	Ryan Sceviour	OL	Calgary
2	17	Eric Mezzalira	LB	McMaster
3	25	Royce Metchie	DB	Guelph
4	28	David Brown	OL	Western
5	39	Justin Lawrence	OL	Alberta
5	42	Dagogo Maxwell	DB	British Columbia
6	50	Atlee Simon	RB	Regina
7	59	Gabriel Ferraro	K	Guelph
8	68	Boston Rowe	LB	Calgary

== Preseason ==
Week	Date	Kickoff	Opponent	Results		TV	Venue	Attendance	Summary
Week	Date	Kickoff	Opponent	Score	Record	TV	Venue	Attendance	Summary
A	Bye								
B	Fri, June 1	7:00 p.m. MDT	vs. BC Lions	L 23–36	0–1	None	McMahon Stadium	24,681	Recap
C	Fri, June 8	7:30 p.m. MDT	at Saskatchewan Roughriders	W 39–12	1–1	None	Mosaic Stadium	29,006	Recap

== Regular season ==
=== Standings ===
West Division
Team	GP	W	L	T	Pts	PF	PA	Div	Stk	
Calgary Stampeders	18	13	5	0	26	522	363	5–5	W1	Details
Saskatchewan Roughriders	18	12	6	0	24	450	444	7–3	W2	Details
Winnipeg Blue Bombers	18	10	8	0	20	550	419	4–6	L1	Details
BC Lions	18	9	9	0	18	423	473	4–6	L2	Details
Edmonton Eskimos	18	9	9	0	18	482	471	5–5	W1	Details

=== Schedule ===
For the second consecutive year, the Calgary Stampeders experienced a two-game losing streak with their loss to the Saskatchewan Roughriders on October 20. They had previously experienced a three-game losing streak to close out the 2017 (which had been the first time in ten years to lose three games consecutive and around five years to have lost at least two games consecutive). With the loss, Saskatchewan is the only team that the Calgary Stampeders have a losing record against in 2018 as of October 20 (though they could have a losing record to the BC Lions as well if they lose their November 3 game to the team. For the second consecutive season, the Calgary Stampeders lost three consecutive games after 10 years without experiencing such a streak (and the first time Bo Levi Mitchell had such a streak as a starting QB in the Canadian Football League). With the loss to the Winnipeg Blue Bombers, the Edmonton Eskimos were officially eliminated from playoff contention in 2018 (the first time the team was eliminated from the playoffs since 2013).

Week	Game	Date	Kickoff	Opponent	Results		TV	Venue	Attendance	Summary
Week	Game	Date	Kickoff	Opponent	Score	Record	TV	Venue	Attendance	Summary
1	1	Sat, June 16	5:00 p.m. MDT	Hamilton Tiger-Cats	W 28–14	1–0	TSN/ESPN2	McMahon Stadium	23,717	Recap
2	2	Sat, June 23	5:00 p.m. MDT	@ Toronto Argonauts	W 41–7	2–0	TSN/RDS2	BMO Field	16,450	Recap
3	3	Thurs, June 28	7:00 p.m. MDT	Ottawa Redblacks	W 24–14	3–0	TSN/RDS2	McMahon Stadium	23,454	Recap
4	Bye									
5	4	Thurs, July 12	5:30 p.m. MDT	@ Ottawa Redblacks	W 27–3	4–0	TSN/RDS	TD Place Stadium	22,103	Recap
6	5	Sat, July 21	7:00 p.m. MDT	Montreal Alouettes	W 25–8	5–0	TSN/RDS/ESPN2	McMahon Stadium	26,440	Recap
7	6	Sat, July 28	7:00 p.m. MDT	@ Saskatchewan Roughriders	W 34–22	6–0	TSN/ESPN2	Mosaic Stadium	33,350	Recap
8	7	Sat, Aug 4	7:00 p.m. MDT	BC Lions	W 27–18	7–0	TSN	McMahon Stadium	25,075	Recap
9	Bye									
10	8	Sun, Aug 19	5:00 p.m. MDT	@ Saskatchewan Roughriders	L 27–40	7–1	TSN	Mosaic Stadium	33,350	Recap
11	9	Sat, Aug 25	1:30 p.m. MDT	Winnipeg Blue Bombers	W 39–26	8–1	TSN	McMahon Stadium	27,800	Recap
12	10	Mon, Sept 3	1:00 p.m. MDT	Edmonton Eskimos	W 23–20	9–1	TSN	McMahon Stadium	32,013	Recap
13	11	Sat, Sept 8	5:00 p.m. MDT	@ Edmonton Eskimos	L 42–48	9–2	TSN/RDS	Commonwealth Stadium	38,611	Recap
14	12	Sat, Sept 15	2:00 p.m. MDT	@ Hamilton Tiger-Cats	W 43–28	10–2	TSN/RDS	Tim Hortons Field	23,428	Recap
15	Bye									
16	13	Fri, Sept 28	7:00 p.m. MDT	Toronto Argonauts	W 38–16	11–2	TSN/RDS2	McMahon Stadium	24,126	Recap
17	14	Mon, Oct 8	11:00 a.m. MDT	@ Montreal Alouettes	W 12–6	12–2	TSN/RDS	Molson Stadium	16,764	Recap
18	15	Sat, Oct 13	6:00 p.m. MDT	BC Lions	L 21–26	12–3	TSN	McMahon Stadium	23,563	Recap
19	16	Sat, Oct 20	5:00 p.m. MDT	Saskatchewan Roughriders	L 29–24	12–4	TSN	McMahon Stadium	30,868	Recap
20	17	Fri, Oct 26	6:30 p.m. MDT	@ Winnipeg Blue Bombers	L 29-21	12–5	TSN	Investors Group Field	25,173	Recap
21	18	Sat, Nov 3	8:00 p.m. MDT	@ BC Lions	W 26–9	13–5	TSN	BC Place	24,114	Recap

== Postseason ==
=== Schedule ===
Game	Date	Kickoff	Opponent	Results		TV	Venue	Attendance	Summary
Game	Date	Kickoff	Opponent	Score	Record	TV	Venue	Attendance	Summary
West Semi-Final	Bye								
West Final	Sun, Nov 18	2:30 p.m. MST	Winnipeg Blue Bombers	W 22–14	1–0	TSN/RDS/ESPNews	McMahon Stadium	29,268	Recap
106th Grey Cup	Sun, Nov 27	4:00 p.m. MST	vs. Ottawa Redblacks	W 27–16	2–0	TSN/RDS/ESPN2	Commonwealth Stadium	55,819	Recap

== Roster ==
2018 Calgary Stampeders final roster
Quarterbacks: 9 Nick Arbuckle; 12 Montell Cozart; 19 Bo Levi Mitchell; Running backs: 35 Ka'Deem Carey; 25 Don Jackson; 23 William Langlais; 34 Ante Milanovic-Litre; 46 Charlie Power; 38 Terry Williams; Receivers: 83 Juwan Brescacin; 89 DaVaris Daniels; 1 Lemar Durant; 20 Bakari Grant; 85 Julan Lynch; 81 Chris Matthews; 15 Eric Rogers; 87 Richie Sindani	Offensive linemen: 60 Shane Bergman G; 63 Derek Dennis T; 53 Brad Erdos G; 59 Randy Richards T; 58 Ryan Sceviour G; 61 Ucambre Williams C; 50 Spencer Wilson T; Defensive linemen: 95 Ja'Gared Davis DE; 4 Micah Johnson DT; 41 Cordarro Law DE; 90 Folarin Orimolade DE; 7 Junior Turner DT; 97 Derek Wiggan DT; Special teams: 54 Pierre-Luc Caron LS; 6 Rob Maver P; 30 René Paredes K	Linebackers: 36 Cory Greenwood; 52 Riley Jones; 48 Wynton McManis; 33 Eric Mezzalira; 49 Alex Singleton; 56 Jameer Thurman; Defensive backs: 27 Tunde Adeleke; 21 Adam Berger; 8 Emanuel Davis; 0 Ciante Evans; 3 Patrick Levels; 31 Tre Roberson; 28 Brandon Smith; 29 Jamar Wall	Practice roster: 40 DaShaun Amos DB; 96 Chris Casher DE; 26 Austen Hartley WR; 47 Gump Hayes DB; 99 Mike Kashak DE; 62 Nila Kasitati C/G; 68 Justin Lawrence C; 16 Royce Metchie DB; 64 Justin Renfrow T; Injured list: 83 Markeith Ambles SB; 84 Reggie Begelton SB; 37 Maleki Harris LB; 88 Kamar Jorden SB; 80 Marken Michel WR; 32 Romar Morris RB; 92 Ese Mrabure-Ajufo DT; 91 Mike Rose DT; 69 Quinn Smith G; 11 Troy Stoudermire DB; 2 Adam Thibault DB; 98 James Vaughters DE; Italics indicate International player Roster updated 2026-05-21; Depth Chart • Transactions

== Coaching staff ==
2018 Calgary Stampeders staff
Front office: President and coo – Lyle Bauer; General manager – John Hufnagel; Assistant general manager of football operations – Michael Petrie; Director of Canadian scouting – Brendan Mahoney; Director of U.S. Scouting – Cole Hufnagel; Head coaches: Head coach – Dave Dickenson; Offensive coaches: Offensive coordinator – Dave Dickenson; Quarterbacks – Ryan Dinwiddie; Running backs – Marc Mueller; Receivers – Pete Costanza; Offensive line – Pat DelMonaco	Defensive coaches: Defensive coordinator – DeVone Claybrooks; Defensive line – Corey Mace; Linebackers – Brent Monson; Defensive backs – Josh Bell; Special teams coaches: Special teams coordinator – Mark Kilam; Strength and conditioning: Strength and conditioning – Taylor Altilio; → Coaching staff
