= Metchie =

Metchie is a surname. Notable people with the surname include:

- John Metchie III (born 2000), Canadian gridiron football wide receiver
- Royce Metchie (born 1996), Canadian gridiron football defensive back
