= Charlie Moore (Canadian football) =

Canadian gridiron football player (born 1998)

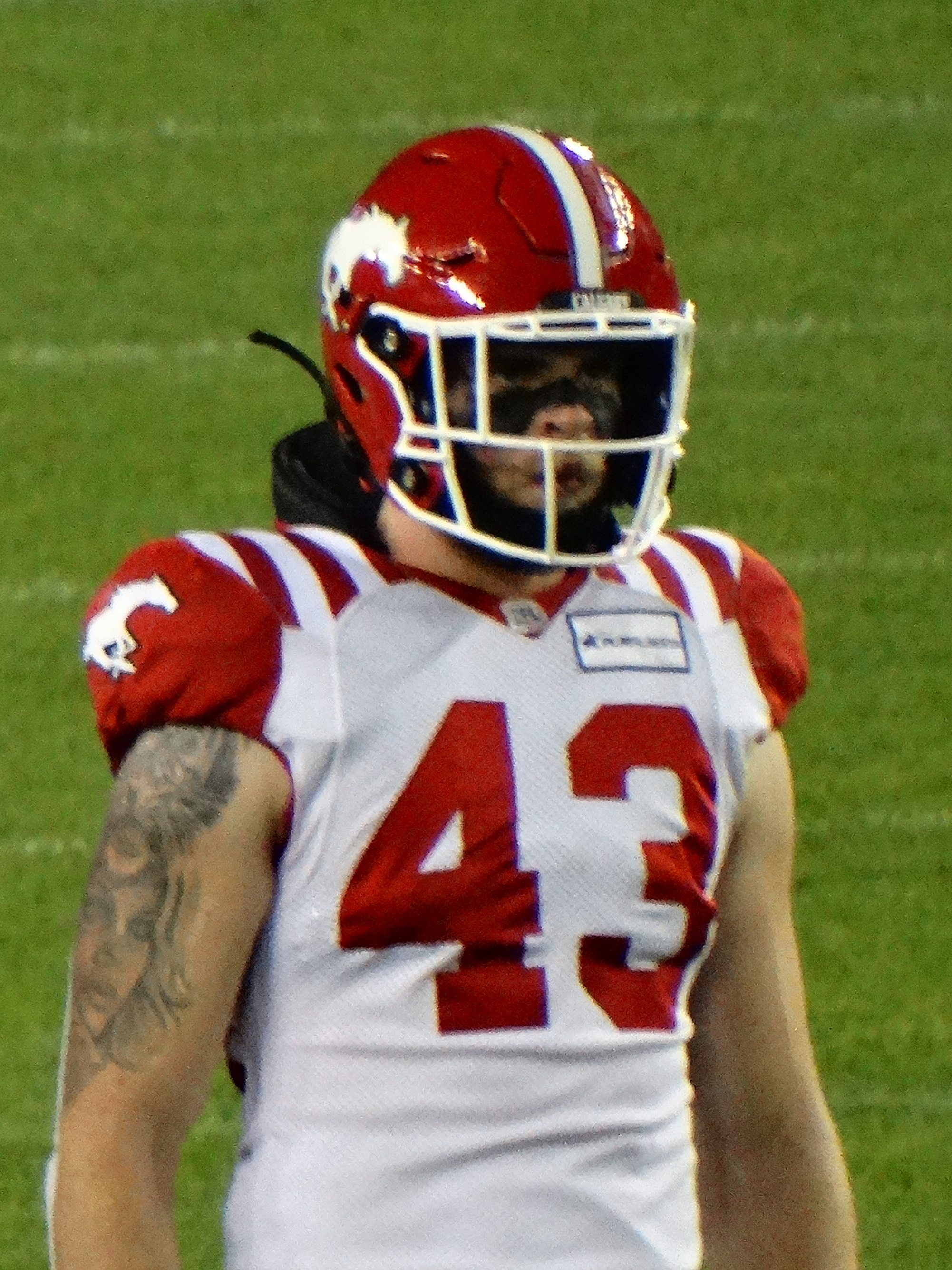
- Moore with the Calgary Stampeders in 2023

No. 43
- Position: Linebacker

Personal information
- Born: March 14, 1998 (age 28); Delta, British Columbia, Canada
- Listed height: 6 ft 2 in (1.88 m)
- Listed weight: 215 lb (98 kg)

Career information
- High school: South Delta Secondary (BC)
- University: Calgary
- CFL draft: 2021: 3rd round, 26th overall pick

Career history
- 2021–2023: Calgary Stampeders

Awards and highlights
- Vanier Cup champion (2019)
- Stats at CFL.ca

Charlie Moore (born March 14, 1998) is a Canadian former professional football linebacker who played for the Calgary Stampeders of the Canadian Football League (CFL).

== University career ==
After using a redshirt season in 2016, Moore played U Sports football for the Calgary Dinos from 2017 to 2019. He played in 17 regular season games where he had 77 tackles, three forced fumbles, one fumble recovery, one sack, and one interception. In 2019, he finished as a Vanier Cup champion following the team's victory over the Montreal Carabins in the 2019 championship game. He did not play in 2020 due to the cancellation of the 2020 U Sports football season but remained eligible for the 2021 CFL draft.

== Professional career ==
Pre-draft measurables
Height	Weight	40-yard dash	20-yard shuttle	Three-cone drill	Broad jump	Bench press
6 ft 2 1/8 in (1.88 m)	225 lb (102 kg)	4.73 s	4.33 s	7.13 s	9 ft 7 5/8 in (2.94 m)	11 reps
All values from CFL Combine

Moore was drafted in the third round, 26th overall, by the Calgary Stampeders in the 2021 CFL draft and signed with the team on May 18, 2021. He made the team's active roster following training camp and made his professional debut on August 7, 2021, against the Toronto Argonauts, where he had one punt block and one fumble recovery. He played in all 14 regular season games in 2021 where he had nine special teams tackles. Moore also played in the team's West Semi-Final loss to the Saskatchewan Roughriders.

In 2022, Moore again made the team's opening day roster and played predominantly on special teams. He retired on April 29, 2024.
