= Michael Klukas =

Canadian football player (born 1994)

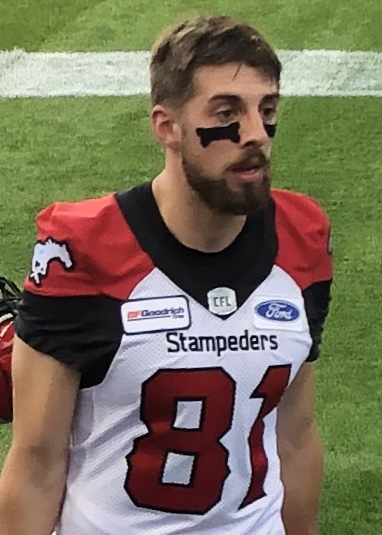
- Klukas with the Calgary Stampeders in 2019

No. 81
- Position: Wide receiver

Personal information
- Born: May 2, 1994 (age 32); Calgary, Alberta, Canada
- Listed height: 6 ft 0 in (1.83 m)
- Listed weight: 189 lb (86 kg)

Career information
- High school: St. Mary's
- University: Calgary
- CFL draft: 2016: undrafted

Career history
- 2018–2020: Calgary Stampeders
- 2021: Ottawa Redblacks
- Stats at CFL.ca

Michael Jeffery Klukas (born May 2, 1994) is a Canadian former professional football wide receiver. He played U Sports football for the Calgary Dinos from 2013 to 2017.

== Professional career ==
Klukas was eligible for the 2016 CFL draft, but was not drafted by any team and played his fifth year of eligibility at university. He was signed as an undrafted free agent by the Stampeders on December 7, 2017. He spent the 2018 season on the practice roster before being released on September 7, 2018. He was re-signed in the following off-season on December 19, 2018. Klukas played in his first professional game on June 15, 2019, against the Ottawa Redblacks where he also recorded his first career reception.

Klukas signed with the Ottawa Redblacks on July 5, 2021.
