= Elliot Graham (Canadian football) =

Canadian gridiron football player (born 1998)

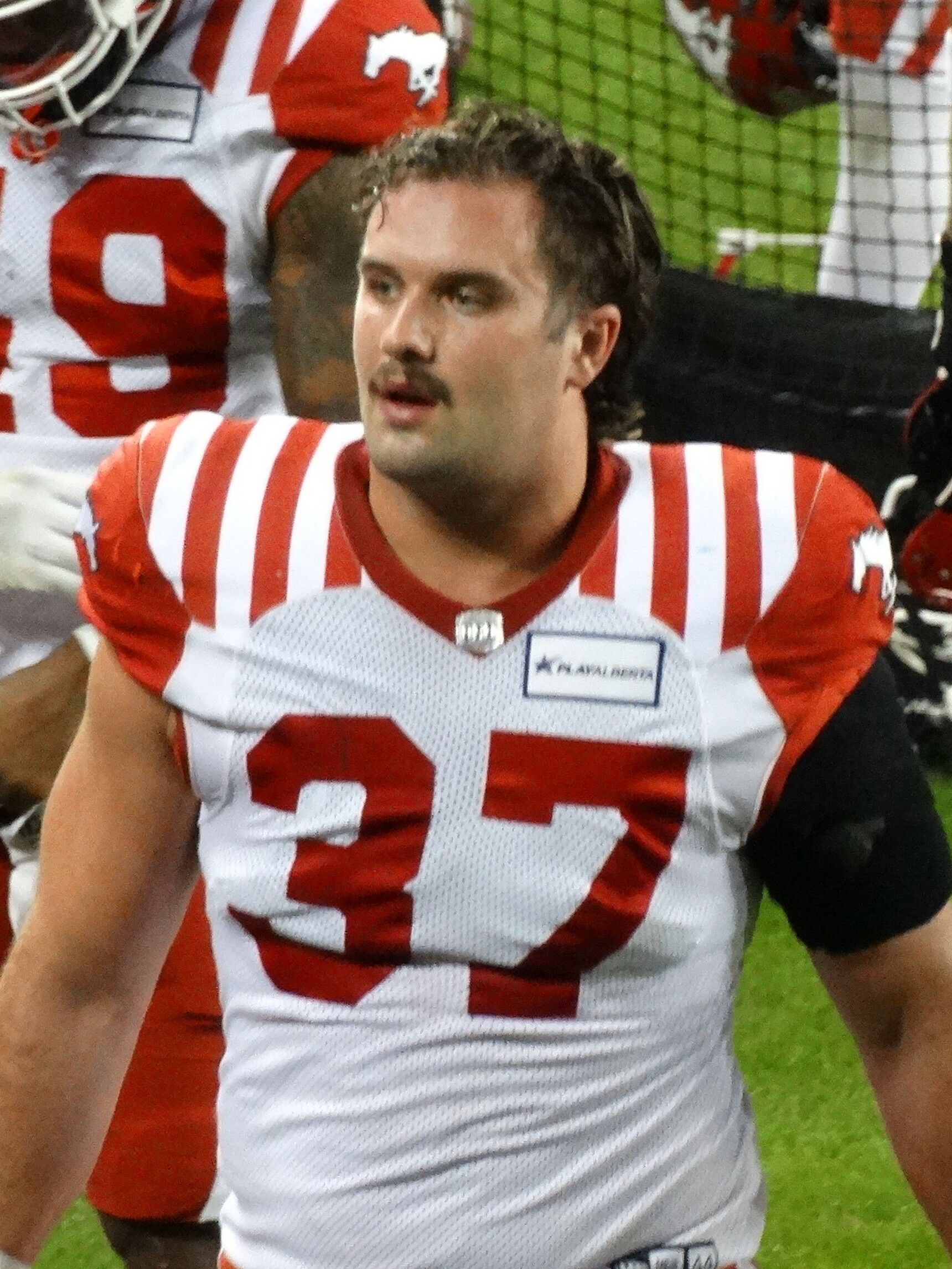
- Graham with the Calgary Stampeders in 2023

Profile
- Position: Defensive lineman

Personal information
- Born: September 21, 1998 (age 28); Hamilton, Ontario, Canada
- Listed height: 6 ft 3 in (1.91 m)
- Listed weight: 249 lb (113 kg)

Career information
- High school: Westdale Secondary (ON)
- University: British Columbia
- CFL draft: 2021: 4th round, 29th overall pick

Career history
- 2021–2024: Calgary Stampeders
- Stats at CFL.ca

Elliot Graham (born September 21, 1998) is a Canadian professional football defensive lineman. He previously played for the Calgary Stampeders of the Canadian Football League (CFL).

== University career ==
Graham played U Sports football for the UBC Thunderbirds from 2017 to 2019. He played in 23 regular season games where he had 87 tackles, one forced fumble, and one sack. He did not play in 2020 due to the cancellation of the 2020 U Sports football season but remained eligible for the 2021 CFL draft.

== Professional career ==
Graham was drafted in the fourth round, 29th overall, by the Calgary Stampeders in the 2021 CFL draft and signed with the team on May 18, 2021. He made the team's active roster following training camp and made his professional debut on August 7, 2021, against the Toronto Argonauts. He played in the first seven regular season games in 2021 where he had three special teams tackles. He was transferred to the injured list in week 8 and sat out for the rest of the regular season, but returned to play in the team's West Semi-Final loss to the Saskatchewan Roughriders where he had one special teams tackle.

In 2022, Graham again made the team's opening day roster and played predominantly on special teams. He played in nine regular season games and had one defensive tackle and four special teams tackles. In the 2023 season, he again played in nine games where he recorded two defensive tackles, two special teams tackles, and one forced fumble. Graham played in seven games in 2024, but did not record any statistics. He became a free agent upon the expiry of his contract on February 11, 2025.
