= Pierre-Luc Caron =

Canadian football player (born 1993)

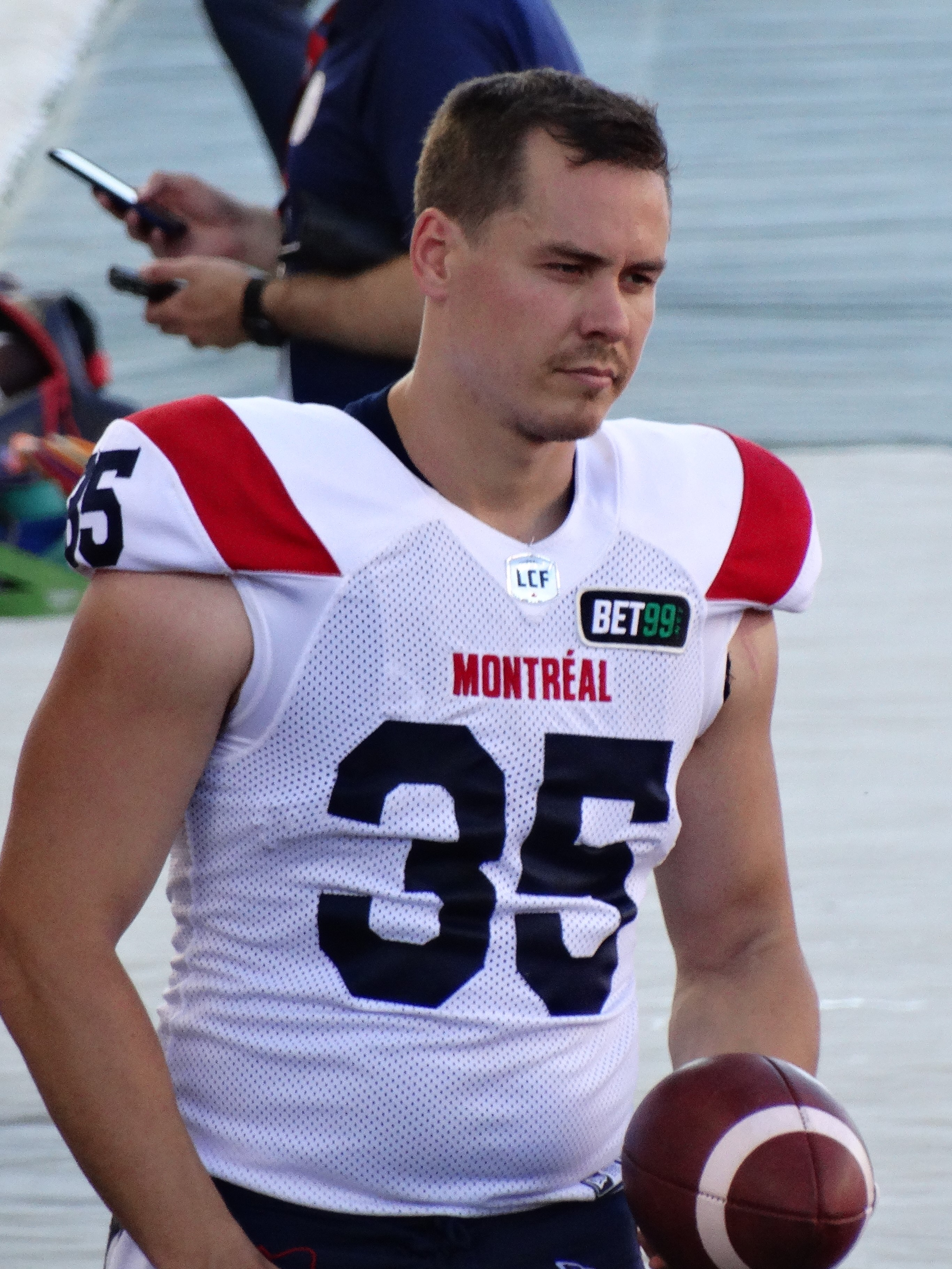
- Caron with the Montreal Alouettes in 2022

Profile
- Position: Long snapper

Personal information
- Born: August 26, 1993 (age 33); Laval, Quebec, Canada
- Listed height: 6 ft 2 in (1.88 m)
- Listed weight: 233 lb (106 kg)

Career information
- High school: Kent School
- University: Laval
- CFL draft: 2016: 5th round, 42nd overall pick

Career history
- 2016–2020: Calgary Stampeders
- 2021–2022: Montreal Alouettes
- Stats at CFL.ca

Pierre-Luc Caron (born August 26, 1993) is a Canadian former professional football long snapper who played for six seasons in the Canadian Football League (CFL) for the Calgary Stampeders and Montreal Alouettes.

== Early life and education ==
Caron attended Kent School (class of 2012) in Kent, Connecticut.

== University career ==
Caron played CIS football for the Laval Rouge et Or from 2012 to 2015.

== Professional career ==
=== Calgary Stampeders ===
Caron was drafted by the Calgary Stampeders in the fifth round, 42nd overall, in the 2016 CFL draft and signed with the team on May 23, 2016. He played in 71 regular season games with the Stampeders and was part of the 106th Grey Cup championship team in 2018. He did not play in 2020 due to the cancellation of the 2020 CFL season. He informed the Stampeders that he would not be re-signing with the club in 2021 due to his wife getting a job opportunity in Montreal.

=== Montreal Alouettes ===
On February 10, 2021, it was announced that Caron had signed with the Montreal Alouettes. He played for two seasons with the Alouettes before announcing his retirement on February, 10, 2023.
