= Gump Hayes =

American football player (born 1992)

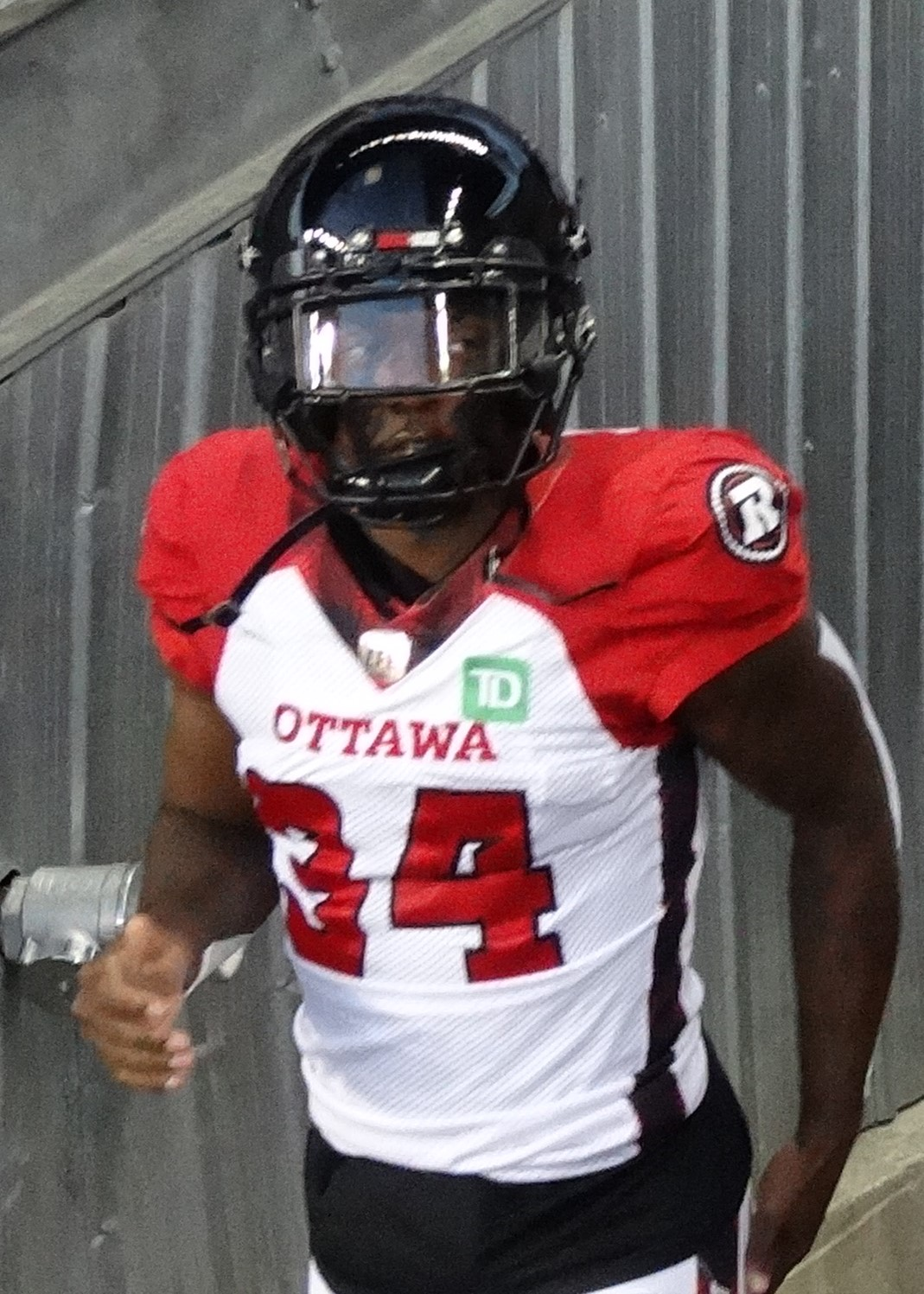
- Hayes with the Ottawa Redblacks in 2021

No. 34
- Position: Cornerback

Personal information
- Born: July 18, 1992 (age 34)
- Listed height: 5 ft 11 in (1.80 m)
- Listed weight: 187 lb (85 kg)

Career information
- High school: Varina (Henrico County, Virginia)
- College: Lackawanna (2012–2013); Arizona State (2014–2016)
- NFL draft: 2017: undrafted

Career history
- Arizona Cardinals (2017)*; Calgary Stampeders (2018)*; Ottawa Redblacks (2019–2021)
- * Offseason or practice squad member only

Awards and highlights
- Grey Cup champion (2018)

De'Chavon "Gump" Hayes (born July 18, 1992) is an American former professional football cornerback who played for the Ottawa Redblacks of the Canadian Football League (CFL). He played college football at Lackawanna College and Arizona State.

== Early life ==
De'Chavon Hayes was born on July 18, 1992. He was raised by his father Ricardo, who gained custody of Hayes when he was three. Hayes said he acquired the nickname "Gump" when he was in sixth or seventh grade when he was playing outside and someone said he had "Forrest Gump speed." He played high school football at Varina High School in Henrico County, Virginia, as a running back.

== College career ==
Hayes first played college football at Lackawanna College as a running back. He played in ten games as a true freshman in 2012, rushing 77 times for 788 yards and eight touchdowns while also catching seven passes for 70 yards and one touchdown, returning 20 kicks for 602 yards and two touchdowns, and five punt returns for 51 yards. He appeared in seven games during the 2013 season, recording 107 carries for 837 yards (119.6 per game) and seven touchdowns, eight receptions for 149 yards, and 15 kickoff returns for 254 yards. In the class of 2014, Hayes was rated the No. 2 junior college running back in the country by both Rivals.com and ESPN.com.

Hayes enrolled at Arizona State University to play for the Sun Devils. He redshirted the 2014 season. He played in all 13 games in 2015, totaling 16 rushes for 57 yards, 11 catches for 44 yards, ten kick returns for 172 yards, and 16 punt returns for 124 yards. He was moved to cornerback for his redshirt senior year in 2016. Hayes appeared in all 12 games during the 2016 season, posting 35 solo tackles, seven assisted tackles, three interceptions for 56 yards, and six pass breakups.

== Professional career ==
=== Arizona Cardinals ===
After going undrafted in the 2017 NFL draft, Hayes signed with the Arizona Cardinals on May 2, 2017. He was waived on September 2, 2017.

=== Calgary Stampeders ===
Hayes was signed by the Calgary Stampeders of the Canadian Football League (CFL) on May 9, 2018. He was moved to the team's practice roster on June 10, where he spent the entire 2018 CFL season. On November 25, 2018, the Stampeders won the 106th Grey Cup against the Ottawa Redblacks by a score of 27–16.

Hayes re-signed with Calgary on February 15, 2019. He was later released on June 8, 2019.

=== Ottawa Redblacks ===
Hayes was signed to the practice roster of the CFL's Ottawa Redblacks on July 22, 2019. He was promoted to the active roster on August 16, placed on injured reserve on October 6, activated from injured reserve on October 18, and placed on injured reserve again on October 25, 2019. He dressed in seven games, all starts, overall during the 2019 season, totaling 22 tackles, three interceptions for 53 yards, and four pass breakups.

The 2020 CFL season was cancelled due to the COVID-19 pandemic. Hayes re-signed with the Redblacks on January 29, 2021. He was placed on injured reserve on August 27, actived from injured reserve on September 2, placed on injured reserve again on October 10, moved to the practice roster on October 15, promoted back to the active roster on October 28, moved back to the practice roster on November 18, and released on November 20, 2021. Overall, Hayes dressed in seven games, all starts, for Ottawa during the 2021 season, posting 13 tackles, one interception, and two pass breakups.
