= Royce Metchie =

Canadian gridiron football player (born 1996)

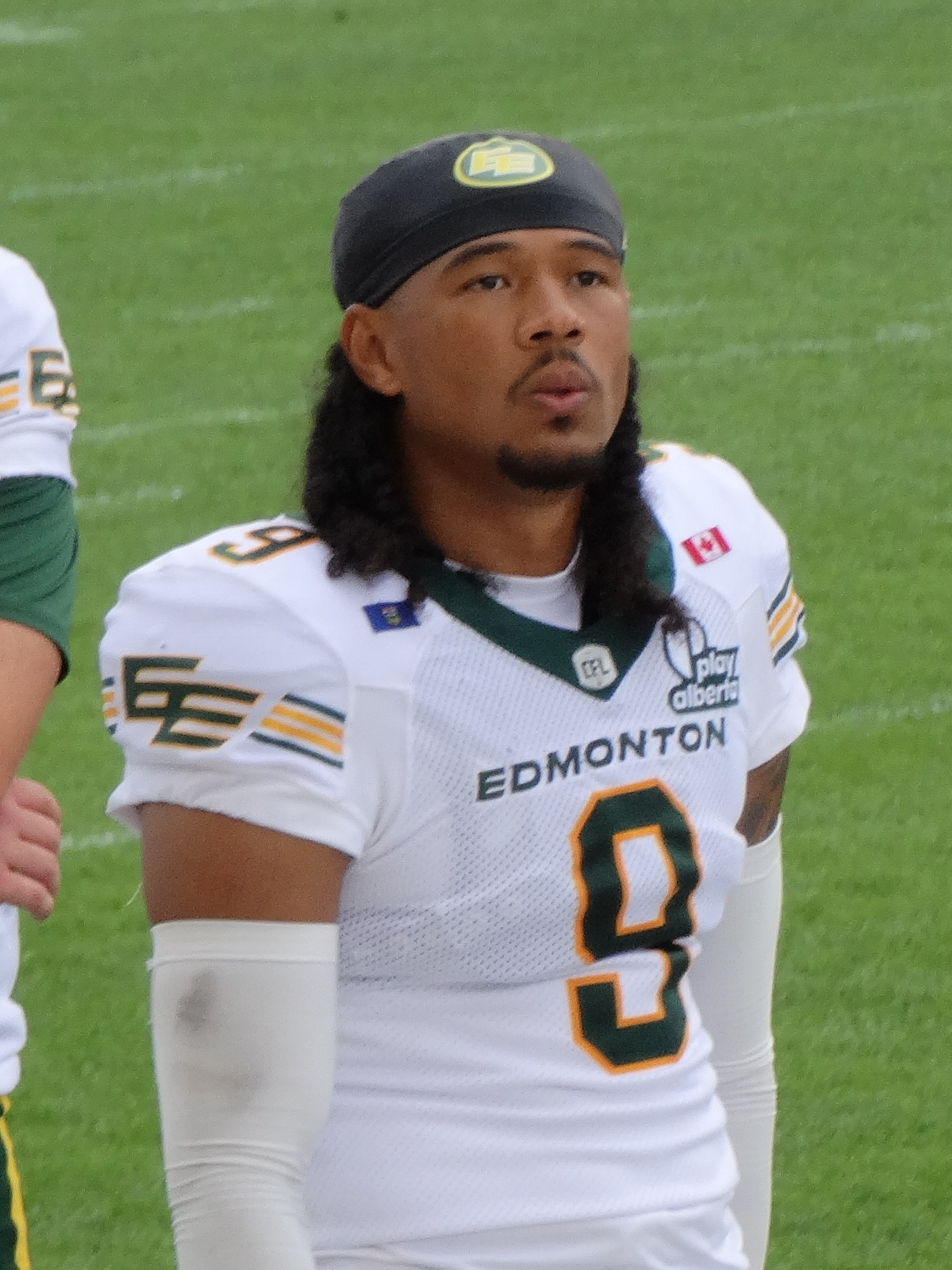
- Metchie with the Edmonton Elks in 2025

No. 9 – Edmonton Elks
- Position: Defensive back
- Roster status: Active
- CFL status: National

Personal information
- Born: September 11, 1996 (age 30); Lagos, Nigeria
- Listed height: 5 ft 11 in (1.80 m)
- Listed weight: 203 lb (92 kg)

Career information
- University: Guelph
- CFL draft: 2018: 3rd round, 25th overall pick

Career history
- 2018–2021: Calgary Stampeders
- 2022–2024: Toronto Argonauts
- 2025–present: Edmonton Elks

Awards and highlights
- 4× Grey Cup champion (2018, 2022, 2024, 2026); David Boone Award (2026)
- Stats at CFL.ca

Royce Metchie (/mɛˈtʃiːeɪ/ MET-chee-ay; born September 11, 1996) is a Nigerian-Canadian professional football defensive back for the Edmonton Elks of the Canadian Football League (CFL). He is a three-time Grey Cup champion after winning with the Calgary Stampeders in 2018 and with the Toronto Argonauts in 2022 and 2024.

== University career ==
Metchie played U Sports football for the Guelph Gryphons from 2014 to 2017.

== Professional career ==
Pre-draft measurables
Height	Weight	40-yard dash	20-yard shuttle	Three-cone drill	Vertical jump	Broad jump	Bench press
5 ft 11 3/4 in (1.82 m)	208 lb (94 kg)	4.73 s	4.28 s	7.35 s	33.5 in (0.85 m)	9 ft 7 1/4 in (2.93 m)	11 reps
All values from CFL Combine

=== Calgary Stampeders ===
Metchie was drafted by the Stampeders in the third round, 25th overall, in the 2018 CFL draft and signed with the team on May 14, 2018. He began the 2018 season on the practice roster, but was soon elevated to the active roster and played in his first game on June 28, 2018, against the Ottawa Redblacks. He dressed in seven regular season games in his rookie season and recorded five special teams tackles. He was on the practice roster during the playoffs when he shared in the Stampeders' 106th Grey Cup victory.

Following the off-season departure of starting safety Tunde Adeleke and the retirement of Adam Berger, Metchie became the Stampeders' starting safety for the 2019 season. He recorded his first career CFL interception during the Labour Day Classic on September 2, 2019, against the Edmonton Eskimos. He played and started in 17 regular season games for the team in 2019 where he had 48 defensive tackles, seven special teams tackles, and three interceptions.

He signed a contract extension with the Stampeders on January 18, 2021. He played in seven games in 2021 where he had 31 defensive tackles, one interception, and one forced fumble.

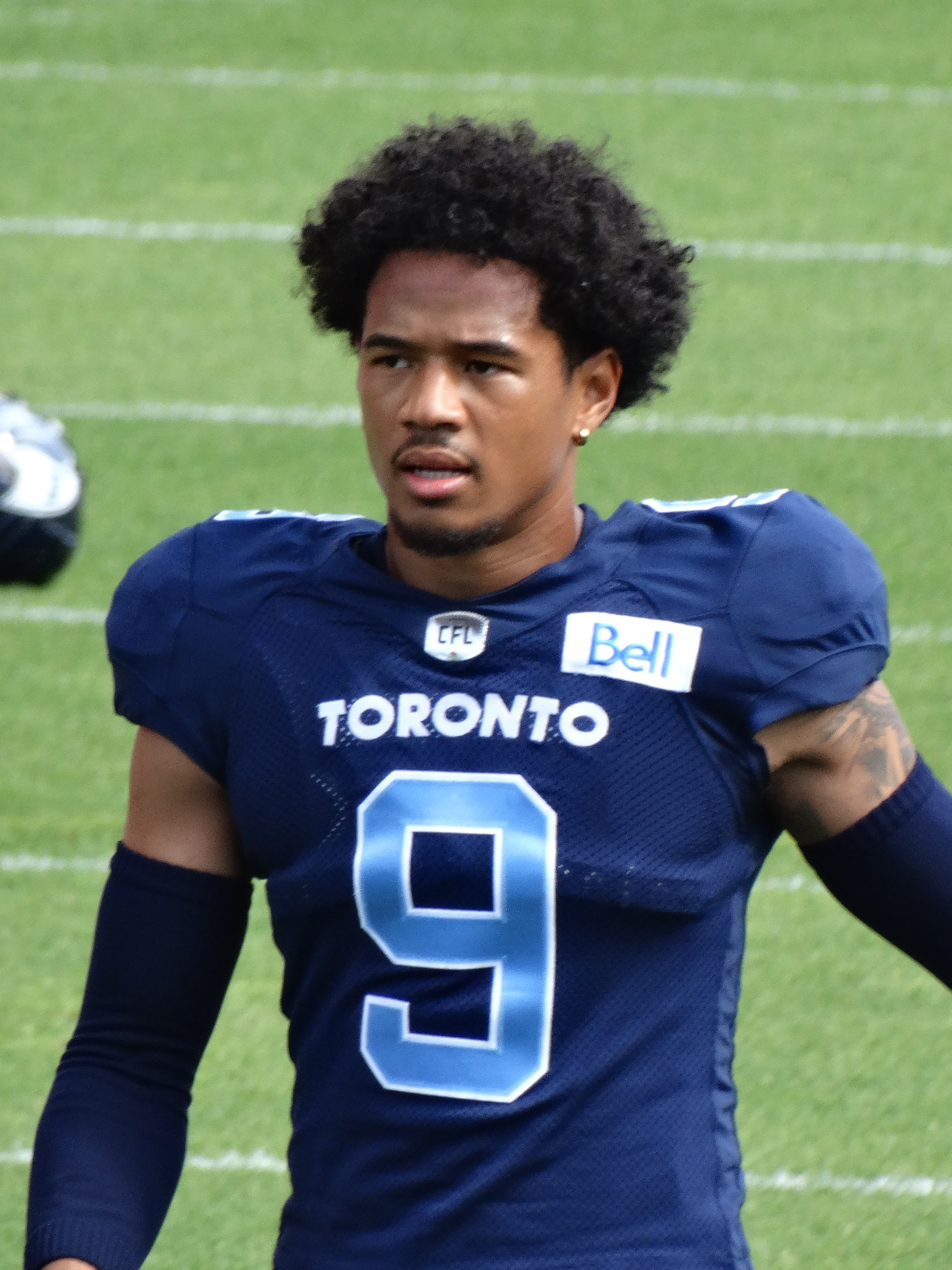
Metchie with the Toronto Argonauts in 2022

=== Toronto Argonauts ===
On February 4, 2022, Metchie was traded to the Toronto Argonauts in exchange for Cameron Judge as both players had contracts expiring the following week. He played in 17 regular season games where he had 72 defensive tackles and two interceptions. He also played in both post-season games, including the 109th Grey Cup, where he recorded three defensive tackles as he won his second Grey Cup championship in the victory over the Winnipeg Blue Bombers.

On February 3, 2023, it was announced that Metchie had signed a two-year contract extension with the Argonauts. On June 25, 2023, he scored his first career touchdown when he intercepted Jarret Doege and returned the ball 15 yards for the score. He played and started in all 18 regular season games where he matched his career-high of 72 defensive tackles and also had three pass knockdowns, two forced fumbles, one fumble recovery, and one interception for a touchdown. He also played in the East Final where he had five defensive tackles and one pass knockdown in the loss to the Montreal Alouettes.

In the 2024 season, Metchie played and started in all 18 regular season games where he recorded a career-high 87 defensive tackles to go along with one interception, two pass knockdowns, two forced fumbles, and one fumble recovery. He started in all three post-season games, including the 111th Grey Cup where he had three defensive tackles in the Argonauts' 41–24 victory over the Winnipeg Blue Bombers.

=== Edmonton Elks ===
The Edmonton Elks announced they signed Metchie through free agency on February 11, 2025.

On October 21, 2026, Metchie was named the 2026 David Boone award recipient.

== CFL career statistics ==
=== Regular season ===
		Defence
Year	Team	GP	GS	DT	STT	QS	Int	FF	FR	TD
2018	CGY	7	0	0	5	0	0	0	0	0
2018	CGY	17	17	48	7	0	3	0	0	0
2020	CGY	Season cancelled
2021	CGY	7	7	31	0	0	0	1	1	0
2022	TOR	17	17	72	1	0	2	0	0	0
2023	TOR	18	18	72	0	0	1	2	2	1
2024	TOR	18	18	87	0	0	1	2	1	0
2025	EDM	10	10	31	0	0	0	0	0	0
CFL totals		94	87	341	13	0	7	5	4	1

== Personal life ==
Metchie was born in Nigeria to a Nigerian father and Taiwanese mother, and spent some time in his youth in Ghana and Taiwan before spending his childhood in Brampton, Ontario, Canada. Metchie's younger brother, John Metchie III, is a wide receiver who played college football for Alabama and was drafted in the 2022 NFL draft by the Houston Texans.
