= Folarin Orimolade =

American gridiron football player (born 1995)

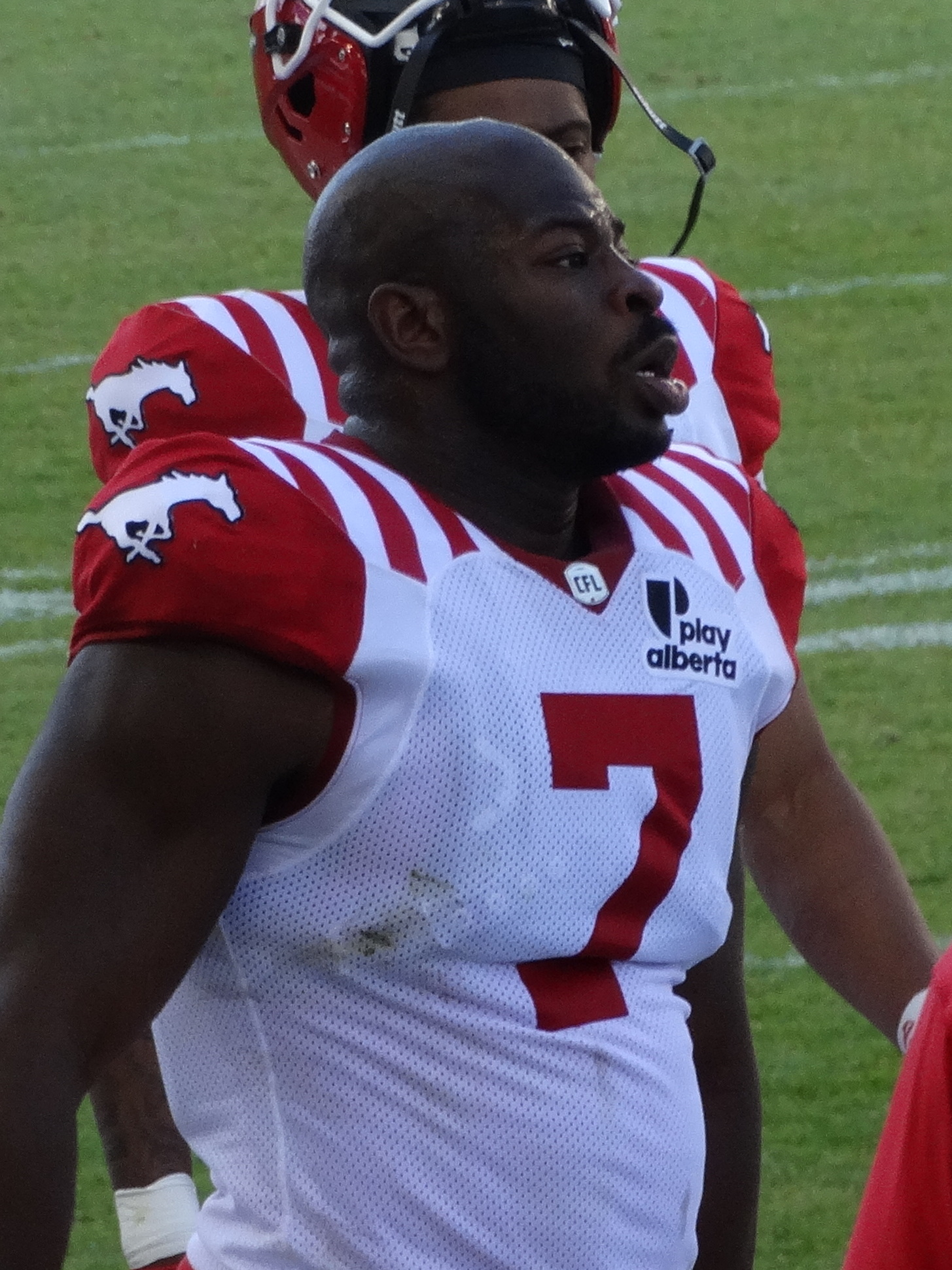
- Orimolade with the Calgary Stampeders in 2025

Calgary Stampeders
- Position: Defensive lineman
- Roster status: 6-game injured list
- CFL status: American

Personal information
- Born: November 23, 1995 (age 30); Washington, D.C., U.S.
- Listed height: 5 ft 11 in (1.80 m)
- Listed weight: 235 lb (107 kg)

Career information
- High school: James Hubert Blake High
- College: Dartmouth

Career history
- 2017: Los Angeles Rams*
- 2018–2022: Calgary Stampeders
- 2023–2024: Toronto Argonauts
- 2025–present: Calgary Stampeders
- * Offseason or practice squad member only

Awards and highlights
- Grey Cup champion (2018, 2024); CFL East All-Star (2023)
- Stats at CFL.ca

Adefolarin Adebayo Orimolade (born November 23, 1995) is an American professional football defensive lineman for the Calgary Stampeders of the Canadian Football League (CFL). He is a two-time Grey Cup champion after winning with the Stampeders in 2018 and with the Toronto Argonauts in 2024.

== College career ==
Orimolade played college football for the Dartmouth Big Green from 2013 to 2016. He played in 39 games where he had 143 total tackles, 23.5 sacks, 10 forced fumbles, and eight pass breakups.

== Professional career ==
Pre-draft measurables
Height	Weight	Arm length	Hand span	Wingspan	40-yard dash	10-yard split	20-yard split	20-yard shuttle	Three-cone drill	Vertical jump	Broad jump	Bench press
5 ft 10 3/4 in (1.80 m)	239 lb (108 kg)	31 5/8 in (0.80 m)	9 3/8 in (0.24 m)	6 ft 3 3/8 in (1.91 m)	4.92 s	1.63 s	2.76 s	4.74 s	7.77 s	36.0 in (0.91 m)	9 ft 8 in (2.95 m)	21 reps
All values from Pro Day

=== Los Angeles Rams ===
Orimolade signed as an undrafted free agent with the Los Angeles Rams on May 2, 2017. However, he was released at the end of training camp on September 2, 2017.

=== Calgary Stampeders (first stint) ===
On May 11, 2018, it was announced that Orimolade had signed with the Calgary Stampeders. He began the 2018 season on the practice roster, but made his professional debut in Week 3 against the Ottawa Redblacks on June 28, 2018. In his second game, on July 28, 2018, he recorded his first career sack against the Saskatchewan Roughriders. He played in ten regular season games for the Stampeders in 2018 where he had seven defensive tackles, 10 special teams tackles, two sacks, and two forced fumbles. He made his post-season debut in the West Final against the Winnipeg Blue Bombers that year and also played in his first Grey Cup game. In the 106th Grey Cup, he recorded two special teams tackles as the Stampeders defeated the Redblacks and Orimolade won his first championship.

In the first pre-season game of 2019, Orimolade endured a quadriceps injury and spent the entire season on the injured list. He also did not play in 2020 due to the cancellation of the 2020 CFL season. He returned in 2021 where he played in seven regular season games and had eight defensive tackles, one special teams tackle, and two sacks. He also played in the West Semi-Final loss to the Saskatchewan Roughriders. As a pending free agent, Orimolade signed a contract extension on January 5, 2022.

During the 2022 season, Orimolade recorded his first interception on August 13, 2022, after picking off the BC Lions' Nathan Rourke and returning it 28 yards for his first career touchdown. He played in 17 regular season games where he had 37 defensive tackles, six sacks, one interception, one forced fumble, and one touchdown. He became a free agent upon the expiry of his contract on February 14, 2023.

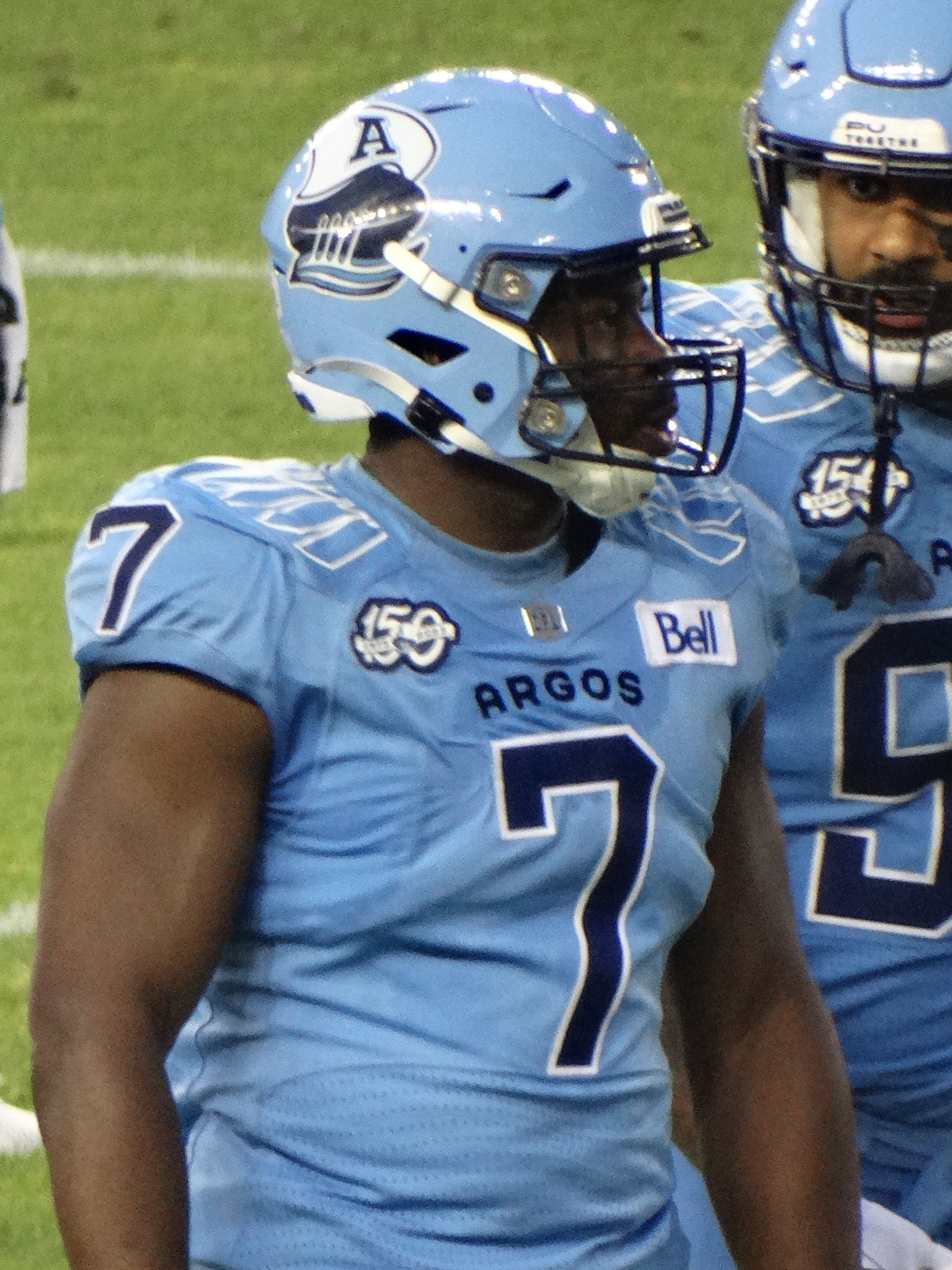
Orimolade with the Toronto Argonauts in 2023

=== Toronto Argonauts ===
On the first day of free agency, on February 14, 2023, it was announced that Orimolade had signed with the Toronto Argonauts. In 2023, he played and started in 17 regular season games, where he recorded 36 defensive tackles, ten sacks, and two forced fumbles. In the East Final, he had three defensive tackles and two sacks, but the Argonauts were upset by the Montreal Alouettes.

In the 2024 season, Orimolade played and started in 12 regular season games as he sat out six games due to injury. He recorded 17 defensive tackles, six sacks, one interception, and one forced fumbles. He also played and started in all three post-season games, including the 111th Grey Cup where he didn't record a statistic, but shared in the Argonauts' 41–24 victory over the Winnipeg Blue Bombers.

=== Calgary Stampeders (second stint) ===
On January 10, 2025, Orimolade was traded back to the Calgary Stampeders in exchange for Cameron Judge.

== Personal life ==
Orimolade was born to parents Taiye and Ibijola Orimolade and has one brother.
