= Josh Bell (gridiron football) =

American gridiron football player and coach (born 1985)

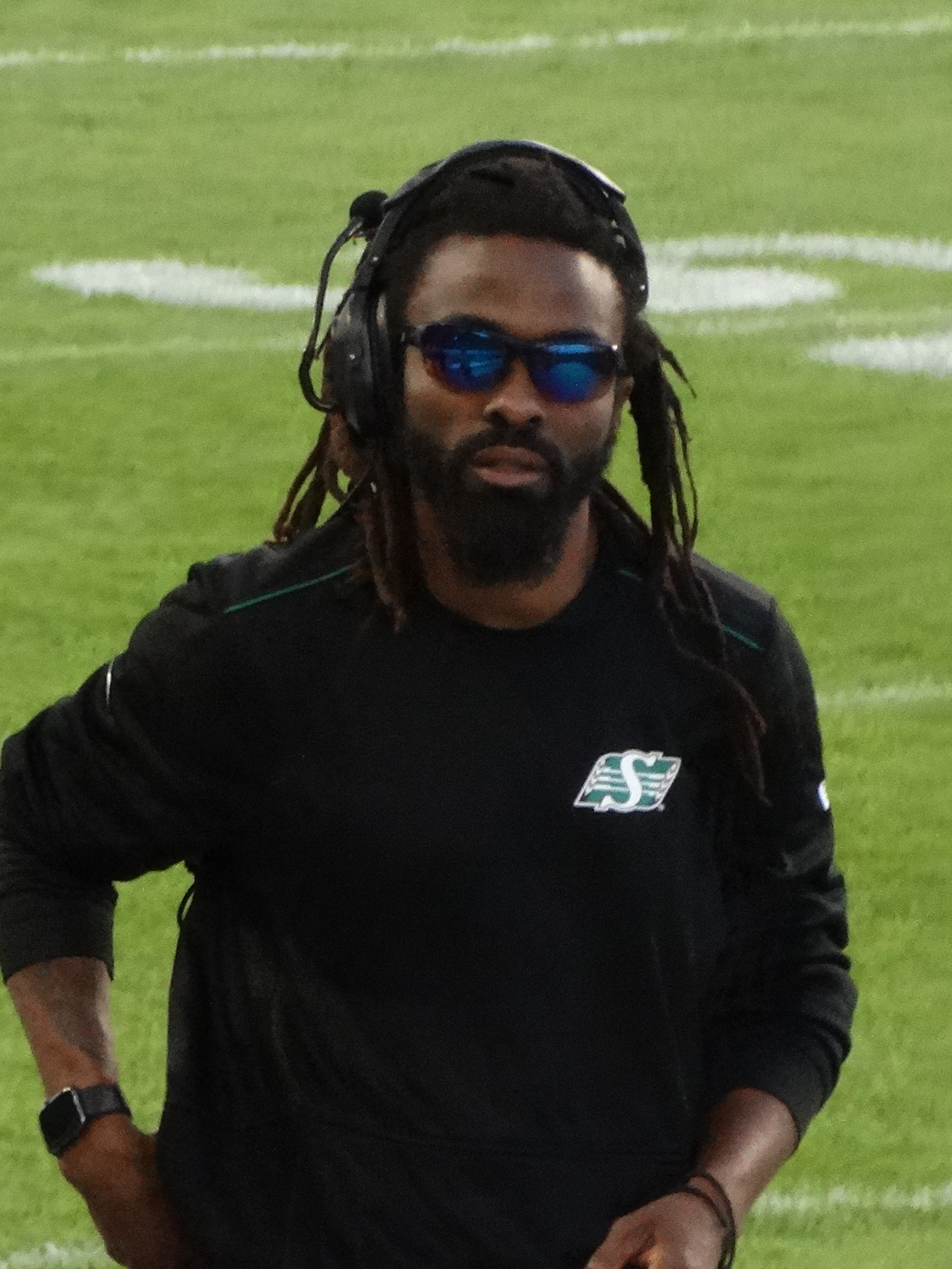
- Bell with the Saskatchewan Roughriders in 2024

Saskatchewan Roughriders
- Title: Defensive coordinator

Personal information
- Born: January 8, 1985 (age 41); Los Angeles, California, U.S.
- Listed height: 5 ft 11 in (1.80 m)
- Listed weight: 177 lb (80 kg)

Career information
- Position: Defensive back (No. 11)
- High school: Skyline (Dallas, Texas)
- College: Baylor
- NFL draft: 2008: undrafted

Career history

Playing
- San Diego Chargers (2008)*; Denver Broncos (2008–2009); Green Bay Packers (2009–2010); BC Lions (2012–2013); Calgary Stampeders (2014–2017)
- * Offseason or practice squad member only

Coaching
- Calgary Stampeders (2018–2020) Defensive backs coach; Toronto Argonauts (2021–2023) Defensive backs coach; Saskatchewan Roughriders (2024–2025) Defensive backs coach Pass game coordinator; Saskatchewan Roughriders (2026–present) Defensive coordinator

Awards and highlights
- Super Bowl champion (XLV); 4× Grey Cup champion (2014, 2018, 2022, 2025); CFL West All-Star (2015)

Career CFL statistics
- Tackles: 167
- Interceptions: 4
- Pass deflections: 16
- Stats at CFL.ca
- Stats at Pro Football Reference

Joshua Paul Bell (born January 8, 1985) is an American professional football defensive coordinator for the Saskatchewan Roughriders in the Canadian Football League (CFL). He played defensive back for nine years in the National Football League (NFL) and the CFL. He was originally signed by the San Diego Chargers as an undrafted free agent in 2008. He played college football at Baylor.

Bell has also been a member of the Denver Broncos, Green Bay Packers, BC Lions, and Calgary Stampeders.

== Professional career ==
Pre-draft measurables
Height	Weight	40-yard dash	10-yard split	20-yard split	20-yard shuttle	Three-cone drill	Vertical jump	Broad jump	Bench press
5 ft 11 1/8 in (1.81 m)	177 lb (80 kg)	4.53 s	1.56 s	2.63 s	4.50 s	7.52 s	33.0 in (0.84 m)	10 ft 1 in (3.07 m)	9 reps
All values from Pro Day

=== San Diego Chargers ===
After going undrafted in the 2008 NFL draft, Bell was signed by the San Diego Chargers as an undrafted free agent. He was released on August 30.

=== Denver Broncos ===
Bell was signed to the practice squad of the Denver Broncos on September 24, 2008. He was promoted to the active roster on October 27 after an injury to cornerback Champ Bailey. In his rookie season, Bell appeared in nine games (five starts) and recorded 34 tackles and four pass deflections. He was waived/injured and subsequently placed on injured reserve on September 4, 2009. On September 10, 2009, the Broncos reached an injury settlement with Bell and released him.

=== Green Bay Packers ===
On November 23, 2009, the Green Bay Packers signed Bell after losing Al Harris to a season-ending injury. On August 10, 2010, Bell was placed on injured reserve.

=== BC Lions ===
Bell signed with the BC Lions on May 22, 2012, and played with the club for two seasons. In his first season in BC Bell only saw limited playing time on both defense and special teams. In his second year in the CFL, Bell recorded 45 tackles and 1 interception.

=== Calgary Stampeders ===
On February 12, 2014, Bell signed as a free agent with the Calgary Stampeders, reuniting him with former defensive coordinator, Rich Stubler. Bell started all 18 games at defensive back for the Stamps in the 2014 CFL season. He finished the season with 56 tackles, 2 special teams tackles and 2 interceptions. On February 26, 2015, Bell and the Stamps agreed to a contract extension.

Bell announced his retirement as a player on February 1, 2018.

== Coaching career ==
=== Calgary Stampeders ===
On the same day that he retired as a player, Bell joined the Calgary Stampeders' staff as the new defensive backs coach for the 2018 season. In his first year as a coach, he won his second Grey Cup championship following a Stampeders win in the 106th Grey Cup game. Following the cancelled 2020 CFL season, Bell was not retained by the Stampeders for 2021 due to the league-mandated football operation cap.

=== Toronto Argonauts ===
On May 14, 2021, it was announced that Bell had joined the Toronto Argonauts as the team's defensive backs coach. He won the 109th Grey Cup in 2022 and was with the Argonauts for three years.

=== Saskatchewan Roughriders ===
On January 15, 2024, it was announced that Bell had been named the defensive backs coach and pass game coordinator for the Saskatchewan Roughriders. He spent two seasons in that capacity and won the 112th Grey Cup in his second season with the team. He was promoted to defensive coordinator on January 9, 2026.
