= Eric Mezzalira =

Canadian football player (born 1994)

No. 33
- Position: Linebacker

Personal information
- Born: March 10, 1994 (age 32); Hamilton, Ontario, Canada
- Listed height: 6 ft 0 in (1.83 m)
- Listed weight: 220 lb (100 kg)

Career information
- High school: Cardinal Newman Secondary
- University: McMaster
- CFL draft: 2018: 2nd round, 17th overall pick

Career history
- 2018–2020: Calgary Stampeders
- 2021: Toronto Argonauts*
- 2022: Winnipeg Blue Bombers*
- 2022: Montreal Alouettes*
- * Offseason or practice squad member only

Awards and highlights
- Grey Cup champion (2018)
- Stats at CFL.ca

Eric Mezzalira (born March 10, 1994) is a Canadian former professional football linebacker who played in the Canadian Football League (CFL).

== University career ==
Mezzalira played U Sports football for the McMaster Marauders from 2014 to 2017.

== Professional career ==
Pre-draft measurables
Height	Weight	40-yard dash	20-yard shuttle	Three-cone drill	Vertical jump	Broad jump	Bench press
6 ft 0 in (1.83 m)	219 lb (99 kg)	4.90 s	4.41 s	7.44 s	33.5 in (0.85 m)	9 ft 1 1/2 in (2.78 m)	20 reps
All values from CFL Combine

=== Calgary Stampeders ===
Mezzalira was selected to the Ontario Regional Combine where he earned an invitation to the CFL National Combine. He scored the highest result on the Wonderlic at the combine. Mezzalira was drafted in the second round, 17th overall, by the Calgary Stampeders in the 2018 CFL draft and signed with the team on May 14, 2018. He dressed in his first professional game in the team's 2018 season opener on June 16, 2018, against the Hamilton Tiger-Cats. In total, he dressed in 14 regular season games in 2018 where he recorded five special teams tackles. Mezzalira also played in both post-season games, including in the 106th Grey Cup where he had one special teams tackle in the victory over the Ottawa Redblacks.

His 2019 season was beset by injury as he only played in eight regular season games and one playoff game where he had six special teams tackles and one forced fumble. He did not play in 2020 due to the cancellation of the 2020 CFL season and he became a free agent upon the expiration of his rookie contract on February 9, 2021.

=== Toronto Argonauts ===
On June 30, 2021, Mezzalira signed with the Toronto Argonauts. He spent the entire year on the practice roster and his contract expired on December 6, 2021.

=== Winnipeg Blue Bombers ===
On April 11, 2022, Mezzalira was signed by the Winnipeg Blue Bombers. However, he was released with the final training camp cuts on June 5, 2022.

=== Montreal Alouettes ===
On July 31, 2022, it was announced that Mezzalira had signed a practice roster agreement with the Montreal Alouettes. However, he was recently shortly after on August 5, 2022.
