= Dave Dickenson =

American gridiron football coach and former player

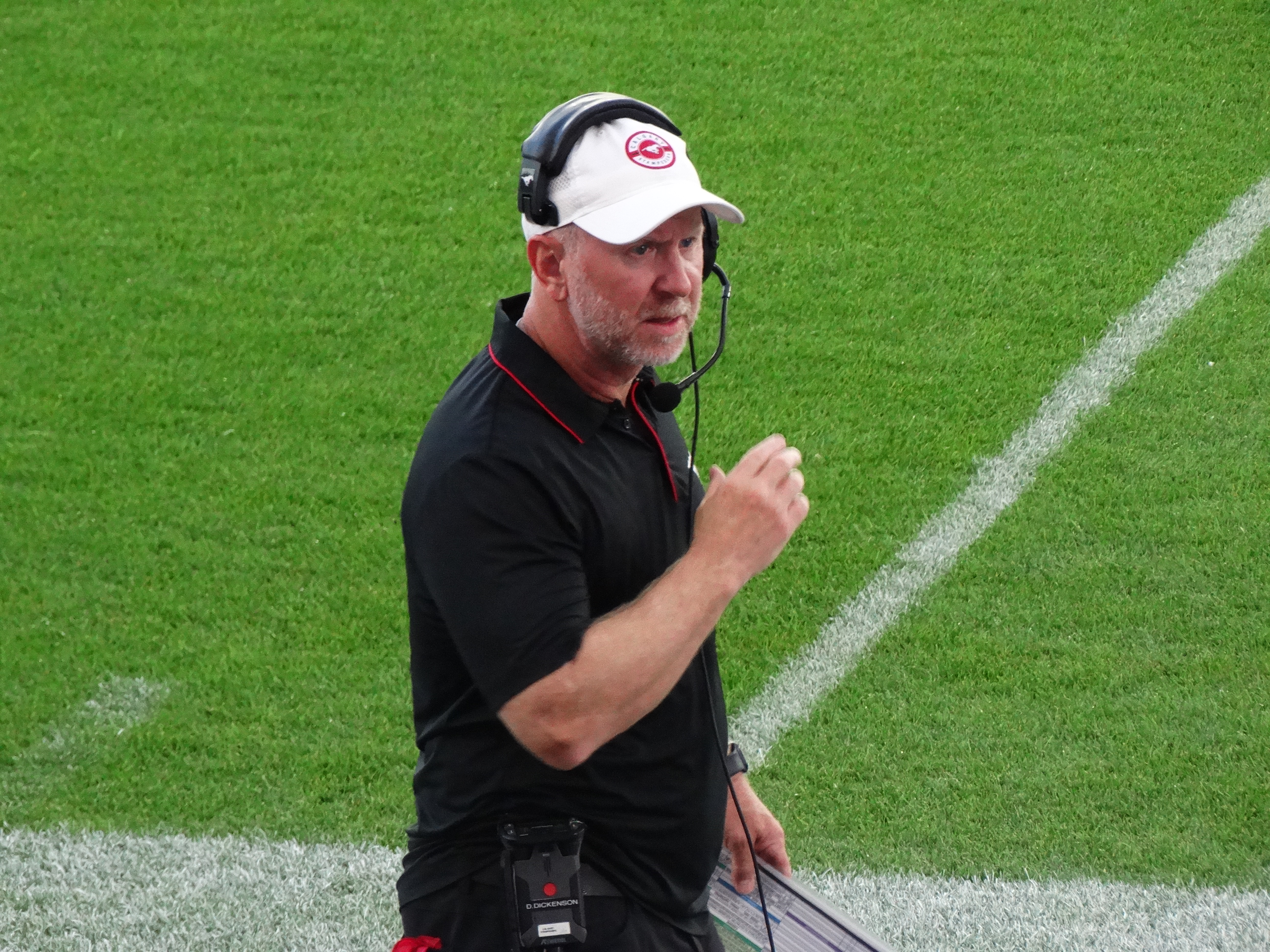
- Dickenson with the Calgary Stampeders in 2026

Calgary Stampeders
- Title: Head coach, general manager

Personal information
- Born: January 11, 1973 (age 53); Great Falls, Montana, U.S.
- Listed height: 5 ft 11 in (1.80 m)
- Listed weight: 190 lb (86 kg)

Career information
- Position: Quarterback (No. 15, 12)
- High school: Charles M. Russell (Great Falls)
- College: Montana (1992–1995)
- NFL draft: 1996: undrafted

Career history

Playing
- 1996–2000: Calgary Stampeders
- 2001: San Diego Chargers
- 2002: Seattle Seahawks
- 2002: Miami Dolphins
- 2002: Detroit Lions
- 2003–2007: BC Lions
- 2008: Calgary Stampeders

Coaching
- 2009: Calgary Stampeders (RB)
- 2010: Calgary Stampeders (QB)
- 2011–2015: Calgary Stampeders (OC)
- 2014–2015: Calgary Stampeders (AHC)
- 2016–present: Calgary Stampeders (HC)

Operations
- 2023–present: Calgary Stampeders (GM)

Awards and highlights
- As a player: 3× Grey Cup champion (1998, 2006, 2008); Grey Cup MVP (2006); CFL Most Outstanding Player (2000); 2× Jeff Nicklin Memorial Trophy (2000, 2003); CFL All-Star (2000); 2× CFL West All-Star (2000, 2003); Division I-AA national champion (1995); Walter Payton Award (1995); 2× First-team I-AA All-American (1993, 1996); Big Sky Offensive Most Valuable Player (1993); 3× First-team All-Big Sky (1993, 1994, 1996); Montana Grizzlies No. 15 retired; As a coach: 2× Grey Cup champion (2014, 2018); Annis Stukus Trophy (2016)

Career CFL statistics
- Passing attempts: 2,421
- Passing completions: 1,635
- Completion percentage: 67.5
- TD–INT: 154–50
- Passing yards: 22,913
- Canadian Football Hall of Fame (Class of 2015)
- College Football Hall of Fame (Class of 2018)

David Dickenson (born January 11, 1973) is a Canadian-American professional football head coach and general manager for the Calgary Stampeders of the Canadian Football League (CFL). He played as a quarterback with the Stampeders and the BC Lions, where he won the 2006 Grey Cup and was named the game's MVP. Dickenson played college football for the Montana Grizzlies, where he led the team to the 1995 NCAA Division I-AA college football championship.

== Early life ==
Dickenson attended Charles M. Russell High School in Great Falls, Montana, was an excellent student, and lettered in football, basketball, and golf. In football, he led his teams to two State Championships. Dickenson graduated from Charles M. Russell High School in 1991 with a 4.0 grade-point average. Dickenson's #15 jersey was soon retired by the school.

== College career ==
Dickenson is considered by many to be one of the greatest quarterbacks to ever play for the University of Montana. He owns numerous Big Sky Conference and Montana records. By the time he graduated in 1995, Dickenson had the highest completion percentage, highest percentage of passes for a touchdown, and fewest interceptions per pass in NCAA Division I-AA history. In his college career (including playoff games), he completed 1,015 of 1,477 passes (68.7%) for 13,486 yards with 116 touchdowns and only 26 interceptions, and was responsible for 137 total touchdowns (116 passing and 21 rushing).

In 1995, Dickenson's senior season, he threw for 5,676 yards in fifteen games, including 1,500 in four playoff games. Along with leading the Montana Grizzlies to a victory in the 1995 NCAA Division I-AA Football Championship Game, Dickenson won the 1995 Walter Payton Award as the outstanding offensive player in Division I-AA.

In Montana, he is known as "Super Dave" and "The Legend of the Fall." His college jersey number, 15, was retired by the University of Montana. He is one of only two players so honored. In 1999, Dickenson was listed as the 12th best Athlete to ever come out of Montana in Sports Illustrated's 50th Anniversary Issue. In 2004, he was voted the most popular athlete from Montana in a Sports Illustrated poll. In 2013, he was named the Big Sky Conference's greatest-ever male athlete. In December 2018, he was to be enshrined in the College Football Hall of Fame.

== Professional career ==
Pre-draft measurables
Height	Weight	Arm length	Hand span	40-yard dash	10-yard split	20-yard split	20-yard shuttle	Vertical jump
5 ft 10 3/8 in (1.79 m)	185 lb (84 kg)	29 3/8 in (0.75 m)	9 in (0.23 m)	5.19 s	1.80 s	2.95 s	4.51 s	29.0 in (0.74 m)

Dickenson was eligible for the 1996 NFL draft, but went undrafted.

=== Calgary Stampeders (first stint) ===
Dickenson was on the negotiation list of the Toronto Argonauts. His rights were traded to the Calgary Stampeders for wide receiver Tyrone Williams.

Dickenson signed with Calgary for the 1996 season. That year, he was a reserve quarterback and did not dress for any games.

In 1997, Dickenson got his first CFL start when Calgary's starting quarterback, Jeff Garcia, was unable to play October 18 when Calgary played in Toronto. Calgary would go on to lose 48–17. Dickenson also got significant playing time when Garcia got injured in the first quarter of the West Semi-Final against Saskatchewan. In a losing cause, Dickenson went 25 of 36 for 292 yards and 2 touchdowns and 0 interceptions passing, and had a 14-yard rushing touchdown.

In 1998, Dickenson made his second CFL start when Calgary played in Winnipeg on July 24 because Garcia was sidelined with a knee injury. Calgary won 44–25. The Stampeders would go on to win the Grey Cup 26–24 over Hamilton that year, and Dickenson was the holder on the winning field goal.

In 1999, Garcia joined the San Francisco 49ers, and Dickenson became Calgary's starting quarterback. Despite suffering some injuries during the season, Dickenson was able to guide Calgary back to the Grey Cup game. This time, Calgary would lose to Hamilton 32–21.

His best year with the Stampeders was 2000. Dickenson led the CFL in passing efficiency (114.1) and completion percentage (64.3%). During the 2000 season, Dickenson earned Player of the Week honors once, was named a CFL All-Star, and won the CFL's Most Outstanding Player Award. The Stampeders finished first place in the West Division in a year that Calgary was hosting the Grey Cup, and hosted BC in the West Final. In the West Final, Dickenson struggled, going 4 of 11 for 53 yards and 2 interceptions and 1 touchdown passing. On the touchdown pass, Dickenson suffered a knee injury that forced him from the game. Calgary would go on to lose 37–23.

=== National Football League ===
After generating interest from the NFL following his outstanding 2000 CFL season, Dickenson spent two seasons (2001-2002) in the National Football League. He spent the entire 2001 season as the third string QB for the San Diego Chargers, but was released by San Diego at the end of training camp in 2002 after a disappointing preseason in which he did not get to play in a game. He was then signed by the Seattle Seahawks and served as the third QB for two games before being released on September 24. In October, he signed with the Miami Dolphins following an injury to Jay Fiedler, and served as their third QB until December 3. He finished the season as the third QB for the Detroit Lions for their final two games after Joey Harrington was diagnosed with an irregular heartbeat.

=== BC Lions ===
Dickenson signed as a free agent with the BC Lions in 2003, reuniting him with his head coach in Calgary, Wally Buono. During the 2003 season, in which he led the Lions into the playoffs with an 11–7, 4th-place finish in the CFL West Division, Dickenson's 36 touchdown passes and 5,496 yards (5,026 m) were the second-highest single season marks in Lions' history behind Doug Flutie in 1991. Dickenson was named Offensive Player of the Month for August 2003, was the CFL Player of the Week in Week 5, and was awarded the Jeff Nicklin Memorial Trophy as the CFL West Division's Most Outstanding Player. Dickenson was unable to play in the team's playoff game in Toronto due to injury. BC lost 28–7.

In 2004, Dickenson began the season as the Lions' starting quarterback, but gave way to backup Casey Printers after suffering a knee injury. Printers put on a dominating performance for the rest of the season, and won the CFL's Most Outstanding Player award. In the West Division Final against the Saskatchewan Roughriders, Printers was forced to leave the game with a shoulder injury in the fourth quarter, with the score tied 14-14. Dickenson, having recovered from knee surgery and shared quarterbacking duties with Printers late in the season, played the rest of the game and threw a touchdown pass in the Lions' 27–25 overtime victory. Dickenson would start and play the entire Grey Cup game against the Toronto Argonauts, which the Lions lost by a score of 27–19.

Dickenson began the 2005 season embroiled in a quarterback controversy with Printers. Dickenson emerged as the starter, and was instrumental in leading the Lions to an 11–0 start (where he played in 9 of the 11 games), en route to a league-best 12–6 season finish. Dickenson set an all-time CFL record with a passing efficiency mark of 118.8. He fell just short of the attempts required to set a further mark with a 74.0% completion rate, due to 4 games missed because of a concussion. Dickenson was named CFL Player of the Month for both July and September, and was Player of the Week twice. BC hosted Edmonton in the West Final, but lost 28–23, which meant BC would not be playing in the Grey Cup the following week.

In 2006, BC's quarterback controversy ended when Printers joined the Kansas City Chiefs. Dickenson threw for 3,032 yards (2,772 m) and 22 touchdowns while only playing 13 games. He led the Lions to the franchise's 5th Grey Cup title on November 19, 2006, with a 25–14 win over the Montreal Alouettes. Dickenson was named the Grey Cup Most Valuable Player. Dickenson's 2007 season was interrupted early by a serious concussion received on a hit from Saskatchewan's Fred Perry. Jarious Jackson eventually led the team to another first-place finish and franchise record 14 wins, but the Lions were defeated in the playoffs with a recovered Dickenson being called on to relieve Jackson. Dickenson was released from the BC Lions on November 26, 2007, after five seasons with the team.

=== Calgary Stampeders (second stint) ===
On January 31, 2008, Dickenson signed as a free agent with the Calgary Stampeders. He returned to the city where he lived with his family, and to the team where he began his professional career. He was reunited with his offensive coordinator from his first season in Calgary, John Hufnagel. Hufnagel had recently been hired as Calgary's General Manager and Head Coach. Dickenson's brother, Craig, was on the staff as special-teams co-ordinator. Dickenson's only playing time that season came in the Labour Day Classic filling in for an injured Henry Burris. However, his return was short lived, as post concussion symptoms returned, thus ending his long storied career in professional football. Dickenson remained with the Stampeders for the rest of the season. Calgary went on to win the Grey Cup 22–14 over Montreal.

Dickenson retired as a player on February 4, 2009.

In 2015, Dickenson was inducted into the Canadian Football Hall of Fame.

== Playing statistics ==
=== Regular season ===
		Passing									Rushing
Year	Team	GP	GS	Att	Comp	Pct	Yards	TD	Int	Rating	Att	Yards	Avg	Long	TD	Fmb
1996	CAL	0	-	-	-	-	-	-	-	-	-	-	-	-	-	-
1997	CAL	18	1	49	36	73.5	407	2	1	103.0	4	11	2.8	5	0	2
1998	CAL	18	1	113	79	69.9	1,170	10	4	118.2	15	66	4.4	24	3	1
1999	CAL	15	11	343	219	63.8	3,048	16	10	95.7	30	236	7.9	25	1	5
2000	CAL	18	16	493	317	64.3	4,636	36	6	114.1	56	309	5.5	36	5	8
2001	SD	0	-	-	-	-	-	-	-	-	-	-	-	-	-	-
2002	SEA	0	-	-	-	-	-	-	-	-	-	-	-	-	-	-
2002	MIA	0	-	-	-	-	-	-	-	-	-	-	-	-	-	-
2002	DET	0	-	-	-	-	-	-	-	-	-	-	-	-	-	-
2003	BC	18	17	549	370	67.4	5,496	36	12	112.7	44	311	7.1	21	2	7
2004	BC	8	4	98	62	63.3	967	8	2	114.6	12	78	6.5	16	0	1
2005	BC	14	11	342	253	74.0	3,338	21	5	118.8	49	299	6.1	24	3	1
2006	BC	17	12	338	238	70.4	3,032	22	7	111.2	32	195	6.1	15	0	1
2007	BC	8	3	87	56	64.4	740	3	3	88.3	9	44	4.9	13	0	0
2008	CAL	9	0	9	5	55.6	79	0	0	85.0	2	11	5.5	6	0	0
CFL totals		143	76	2,421	1,635	67.5	22,913	154	50	110.4	253	1,560	6.2	36	14	26

=== Playoffs ===
Year & game	Team	GP	GS	ATT	COMP	YD	TD	INT	RUSH	YD	TD
1996 West Final	CGY	0	-	-	-	-	-	-	-	-	-
1997 West Semi-Final	CGY	1	0	36	25	292	2	0	1	14	1
1998 West Final	CGY	1	0	0	-	-	-	-	0	-	-
1999 West Semi-Final	CGY	1	1	28	20	289	2	0	2	9	0
1999 West Final	CGY	1	1	23	17	210	1	0	0	-	-
2000 West Final	CGY	1	1	11	4	53	1	2	1	3	0
2003 *East Semi-Final	BC	1	0	0	-	-	-	-	-	-	-
2004 West Final	BC	1	0	11	9	155	1	0	0	-	-
2005 West Final	BC	1	1	31	18	256	1	1	2	19	0
2006 West Final	BC	1	1	37	27	274	3	0	5	45	0
2007 West Final	BC	1	0	19	14	128	1	0	0	-	-
2008 West Final	CGY	0	-	-	-	-	-	-	-	-	-
Totals		10	5	197	134	1,657	12	3	11	90	1

*team qualified for crossover

=== Grey Cup ===
Year	Team	GP	GS	ATT	COMP	YD	TD	INT	RUSH	YD	TD
1998	CGY	1	0	1	0	0	0	0	0	-	-
1999	CGY	1	1	38	24	321	2	1	4	26	0
2004	BC	1	1	27	18	201	1	0	8	36	1
2006	BC	1	1	29	18	184	0	0	6	53	0
2008	CGY	0	-	-	-	-	-	-	-	-	-
Totals		4	3	95	60	706	3	1	18	115	1

== Coaching career ==
=== Assistant coach ===
On May 1, 2009, Dickenson made the transition from player to coach, joining the Calgary Stampeders as an offensive assistant coach. He was responsible for coaching the running backs but was also involved in other areas of the offence. In 2010, Dickenson became Calgary's quarterbacks coach, called the offensive plays on game days, and was heavily involved in game planning.

On December 9, 2010, he was promoted from quarterbacks coach to offensive coordinator. In 2012, Calgary went to the Grey Cup, but lost to Toronto 35–22. The team's offence was led by Canadian running back, Jon Cornish, who rushed for 1,457 yards and was named the CFL's Most Outstanding Canadian. In 2013, Calgary finished with a league-best 14–4 record. Cornish rushed for 1,813 yards, and was named the CFL's Top Canadian and the CFL's Most Outstanding Player. Calgary won games with three different starting quarterbacks: Drew Tate, Kevin Glenn, and Bo Levi Mitchell. The Stampeders would go on to lose the West Final at home 35–13 to the Saskatchewan Roughriders.

Prior to the 2014 season, Calgary signed Dickenson to a three-year contract extension as offensive coordinator and added assistant head coach to his title. That year, Calgary won the Grey Cup 20–16 over Hamilton. The team accomplished this with Mitchell in his first-year as full-time starting quarterback. Mitchell won the Grey Cup MVP award.

On December 3, 2014, Calgary Stampeders general manager and head coach John Hufnagel announced that he would hand over the head coaching duties to Dickenson for the 2016 season. Dickenson retained the titles of Assistant Head Coach and Offensive Coordinator for the 2015 season.

=== Head coach ===
Dickenson led Calgary to a franchise record for points in a season with a 15-2-1 record in 2016. The Stampeders were also unbeaten over a 16-game stretch, which was a single-season league record. He also became the first rookie head coach in the Canadian Football League to win 14 games and also had the second highest point total in league history (one behind the 1989 Edmonton Eskimos). The team also finished with a perfect 9–0 home record, which was the third such instance in team history. Because of all his success Dickenson won the Annis Stukus Trophy for coach of the year. On January 20, 2017, Dickenson and the Stampeders agreed to a 3-year contract extension through the 2020 CFL season.

Calgary was defeated in the 2016 and 2017 Grey Cup games. Dickenson won his first Grey Cup as a head coach in 2018 following the team's victory in the 106th Grey Cup game.

On December 12, 2022, it was announced that Dickenson had been named the team's general manager in addition to retaining his head coaching duties.

=== Head coaching record ===
Team	Year	Regular season					Postseason		
Team	Year	Won	Lost	Ties	Win %	Finish	Won	Lost	Result
CGY	2016	15	2	1	.861	1st in West Division	1	1	Lost 104th Grey Cup
CGY	2017	13	4	1	.750	1st in West Division	1	1	Lost 105th Grey Cup
CGY	2018	13	5	0	.722	1st in West Division	2	0	Won 106th Grey Cup
CGY	2019	12	6	0	.667	2nd in West Division	0	1	Lost West Semi-Final
CGY	2020	Season Cancelled							
CGY	2021	8	6	0	.571	3rd in West Division	0	1	Lost West Semi-Final
CGY	2022	12	6	0	.667	3rd in West Division	0	1	Lost West Semi-Final
CGY	2023	6	12	0	.333	3rd in West Division	0	1	Lost West Semi-Final
CGY	2024	5	12	1	.306	5th in West Division	–	–	Did not qualify
CGY	2025	11	7	0	.611	3rd in West Division	0	1	Lost West Semi-Final
CGY	2026	9	9	0	.500	5th in West Division	–	–	Did not qualify
Total		104	69	3	.599	3 West Division Championships	4	7	1 Grey Cup

== Personal life ==
Dickenson became a Canadian citizen on April 30, 2024.
