= Justin Renfrow =

American gridiron football player (born 1989)

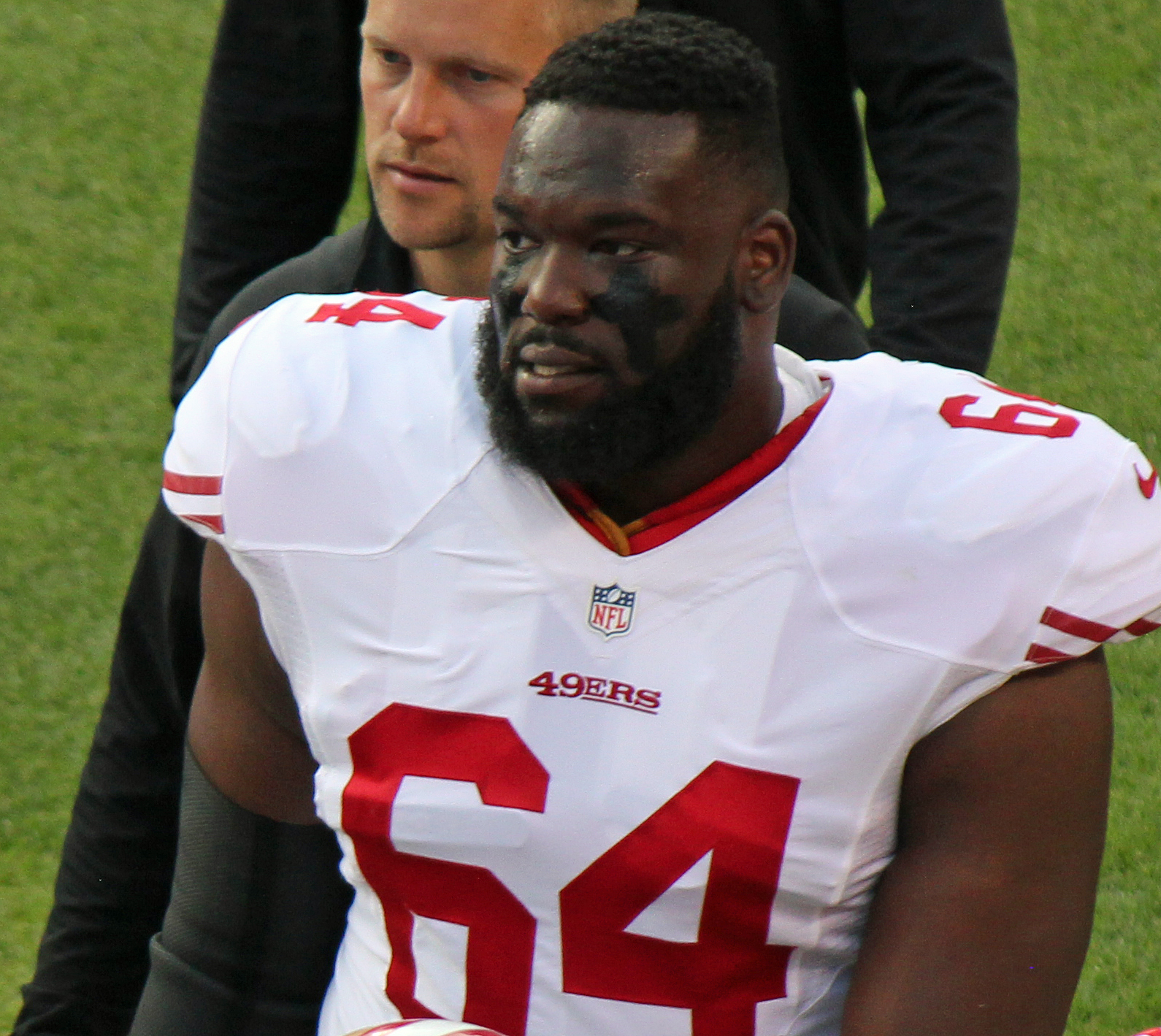
- Renfrow with the San Francisco 49ers in 2015

Jacksonville Sharks
- Position: Offensive lineman
- Roster status: Offensive line coach
- CFL status: American

Personal information
- Born: November 23, 1989 (age 36); Philadelphia, Pennsylvania, U.S.
- Listed height: 6 ft 3 in (1.91 m)
- Listed weight: 315 lb (143 kg)

Career information
- High school: Philadelphia (PA) Penn Charter
- College: Miami (FL)
- NFL draft: 2014: undrafted

Career history
- Arizona Cardinals (2014)*; Blacktips (2014); Green Bay Packers (2014); Seattle Seahawks (2014); San Francisco 49ers (2015); Hudson Valley Fort (2015); Buffalo Bills (2016); Calgary Stampeders (2017–2019); BC Lions (2019); Edmonton Eskimos / Football Team / Elks (2020–2022); Jacksonville Sharks (2023)
- * Offseason or practice squad member only
- Stats at Pro Football Reference
- Stats at CFL.ca

Justin Renfrow (born November 23, 1989) is an American professional football offensive tackle for the Jacksonville Sharks of the National Arena League (NAL).

== Early life ==
Renfrow played defensive end and Tight end at William Penn Charter School.

== College career ==
Renfrow played defensive end for Virginia before switching to play at Miami (FL).

== Professional career ==
=== Arizona Cardinals ===
Renfrow went undrafted in 2014. He and 12 other Cardinals players were released on August 25, 2014.

=== Blacktips ===
Renfrow played for the Blacktips of the Fall Experimental Football League (FXFL) in 2014.

=== Green Bay Packers ===
On November 25, 2014, Renfrow signed with the Green Bay Packers of the National Football League (NFL). On December 30, 2014, Renfrow was released by the Packers.

=== Seattle Seahawks ===
Renfrow switched positions to offensive tackle. He signed a contract with the Seattle Seahawks. He signed a future contract along with 10 other teammates, but was released after.

=== San Francisco 49ers ===
Renfrow signed a contract with San Francisco 49ers on May 18, 2015, along with Michigan State's Mylan Hicks. He was released on September 5, 2015, in order for the 49ers to make their 53-man roster.

=== Hudson Valley Fort ===
Renfrow played for the Hudson Valley Fort of the FXFL in 2015.

=== Buffalo Bills ===
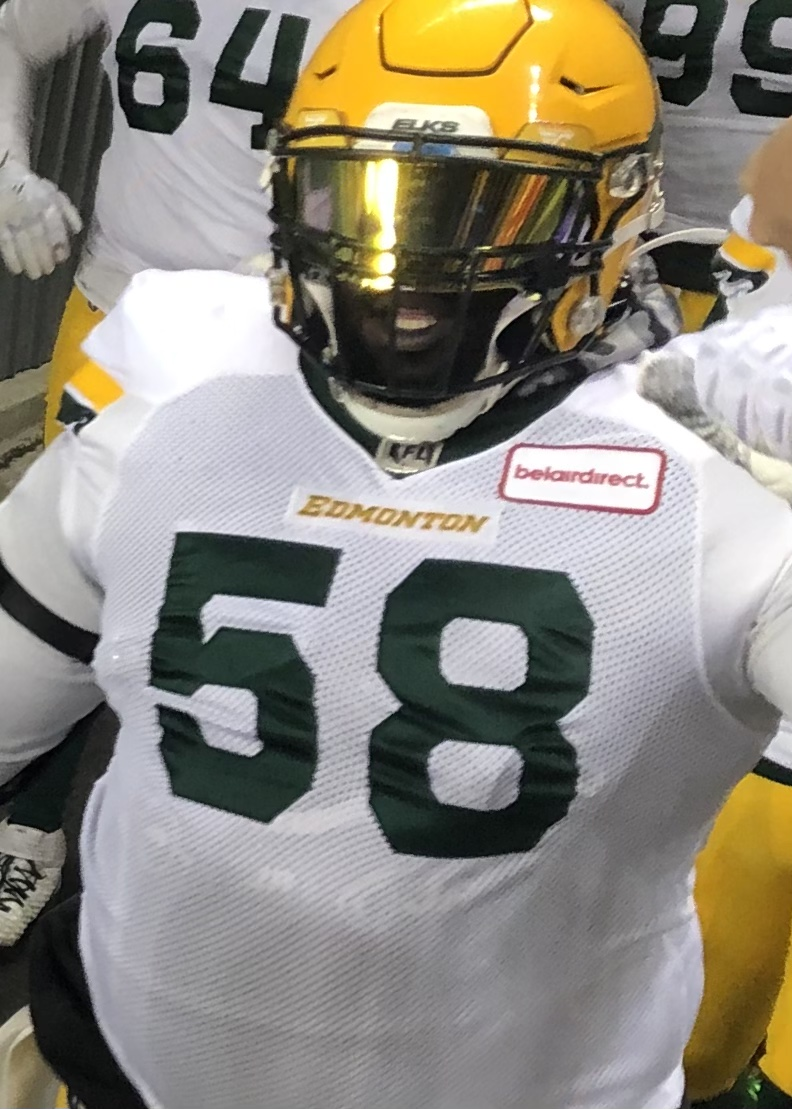
Renfrow with the Edmonton Elks in 2021

On June 17, 2016, Renfrow signed with the Buffalo Bills.

=== Calgary Stampeders ===
Renfrow signed with the Calgary Stampeders on May 19, 2017, and dressed in six games during the 2017 CFL season. He played in only one game in 2018, but was a member of the 106th Grey Cup championship team that year. He spent the first seven weeks of the 2019 CFL season on the practice roster.

=== BC Lions ===
On July 28, 2019, Renfrow was traded to the BC Lions.

=== Edmonton Eskimos/Elks ===
Renfrow was released by the Edmonton Elks on January 9, 2021, but re-signed on July 3, 2021. After the 2021 season, Renfrow's contract was not renewed and he become an unrestricted free agent. The Elks re-signed Renfrow to the practice roster on June 22, 2022. He was released on August 23, 2022.

=== Jacksonville Sharks ===
On February 1, 2023, Renfrow signed with the Jacksonville Sharks of the National Arena League (NAL).
