= Justin Lawrence (Canadian football) =

Canadian gridiron football player (born 1996)

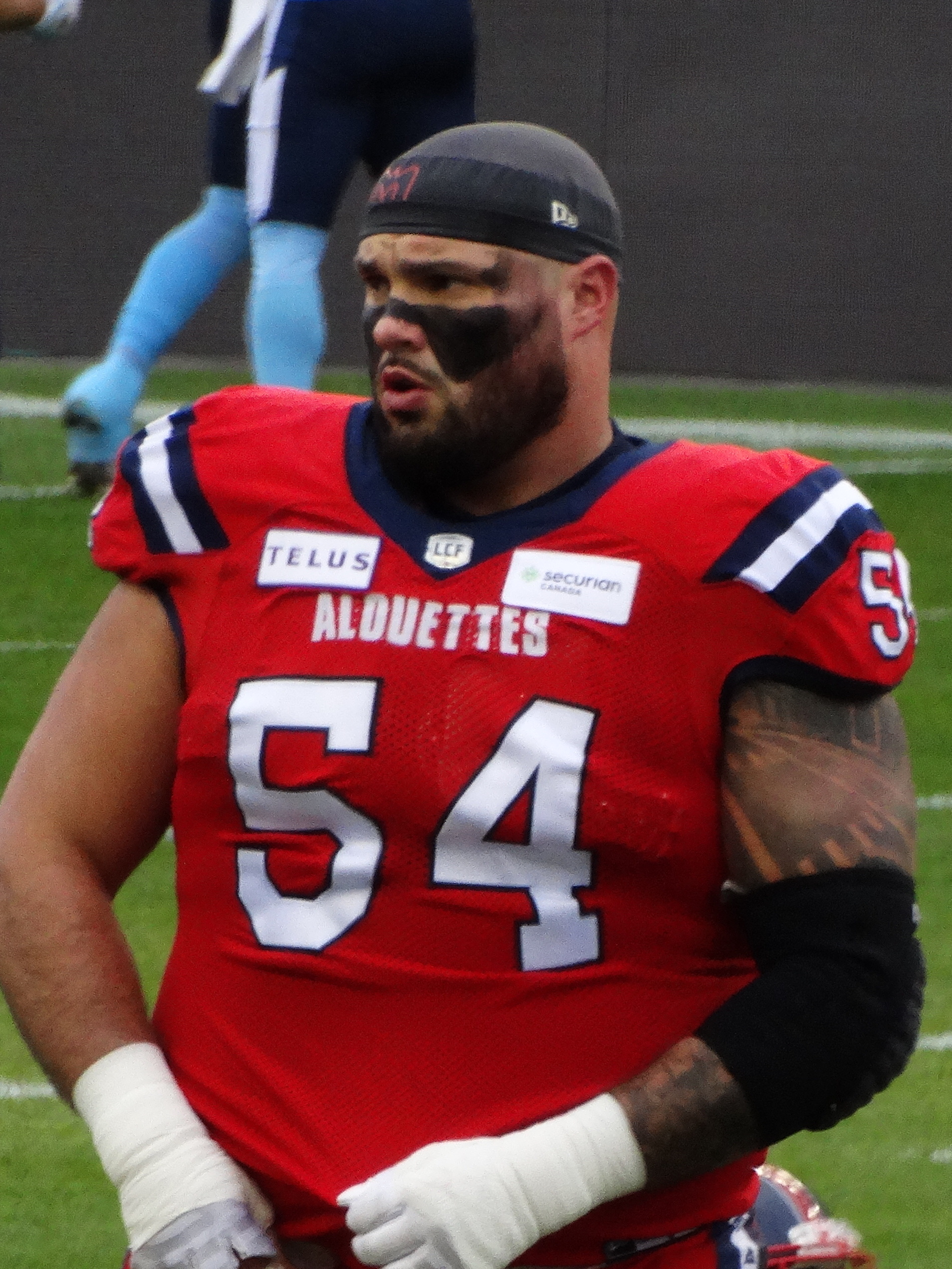
- Lawrence with the Montreal Alouettes in 2023

No. 54 – Montreal Alouettes
- Position: Offensive lineman
- Roster status: Active
- CFL status: National

Personal information
- Born: March 14, 1996 (age 30); Spruce Grove, Alberta, Canada
- Listed height: 6 ft 1 in (1.85 m)
- Listed weight: 308 lb (140 kg)

Career information
- High school: Spruce Grove Composite High
- University: Alberta
- CFL draft: 2018: 5th round, 39th overall pick

Career history
- 2018–2021: Calgary Stampeders
- 2022: Toronto Argonauts
- 2023–present: Montreal Alouettes

Awards and highlights
- 3× Grey Cup champion (2018, 2022, 2023); 2× CFL East All-Star (2022, 2025)

Career CFL statistics as of 2026
- Games played: 108
- Games started: 79
- Stats at CFL.ca

Justin Lawrence (born March 14, 1996) is a Canadian professional football offensive lineman for the Montreal Alouettes of the Canadian Football League (CFL).

== University career ==
Lawrence played U Sports football for the Alberta Golden Bears from 2014 to 2017.

== Professional career ==
Pre-draft measurables
Height	Weight	40-yard dash	20-yard shuttle	Three-cone drill	Vertical jump	Broad jump	Bench press
6 ft 0 3/4 in (1.85 m)	305 lb (138 kg)	5.53 s	4.94 s	8.36 s	24.0 in (0.61 m)	7 ft 10 in (2.39 m)	21 reps
All values from CFL Combine

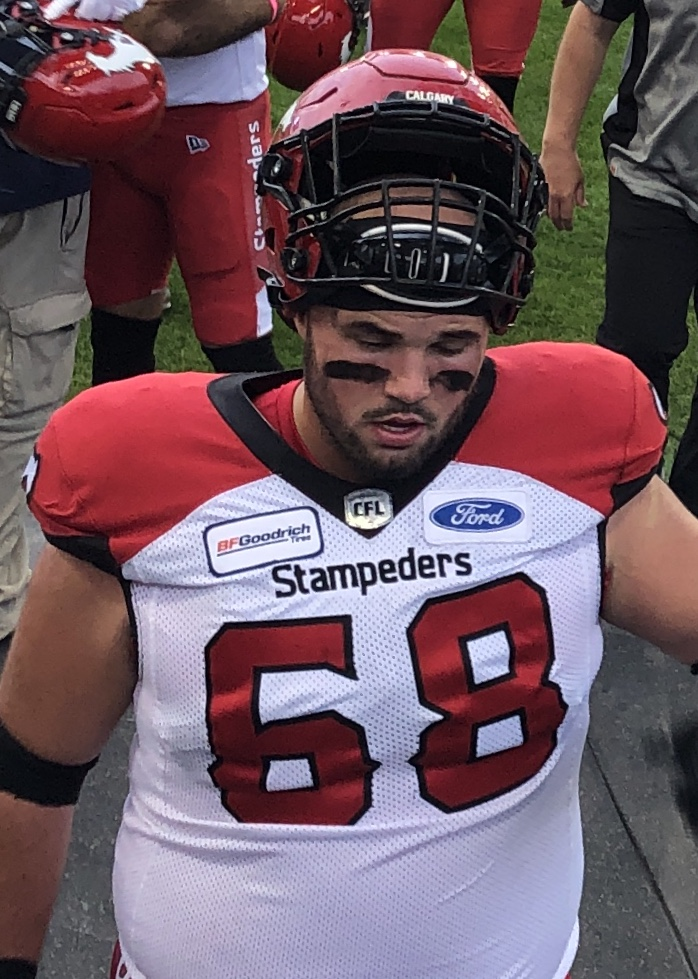
Lawrence with the Calgary Stampeders in 2019

=== Calgary Stampeders ===
Lawrence was drafted in the fifth round, 39th overall, by the Calgary Stampeders in the 2018 CFL draft and signed with the team on May 14, 2018. He dressed in his first professional game in the team's 2018 season opener on June 16, 2018 against the Hamilton Tiger-Cats. He dressed in six regular season games in 2018 and was on the practice roster when the Calgary Stampeders won the 106th Grey Cup.

In the 2019 season, Lawrence dressed in all 18 regular season games where he started six games at centre and one game at left guard. He also played in his first post-season game which was a West Semi-Final loss to the Winnipeg Blue Bombers. After the season, on December 5, 2019, he signed a two-year extension with the Stampeders. He became a free agent upon the expiry of his contract on February 8, 2022.

=== Toronto Argonauts ===
On February 8, 2022, it was announced that Lawrence had signed with the Toronto Argonauts. In 2022, he played in 18 regular season games and started in 17 while making the shift to centre. Near the end of season, he was named a Division All-Star for the first time in his career. Lawrence started at centre in the 109th Grey Cup game and won his second Grey Cup championship as the Argonauts defeated the Winnipeg Blue Bombers 24–23. He became a free agent on February 14, 2023.

=== Montreal Alouettes ===
On February 14, 2023, it was announced that Lawrence had signed with the Montreal Alouettes. He played and started in all 18 games during the 2023 regular season.
