= Richie Sindani =

Canadian gridiron football player (born 1995)

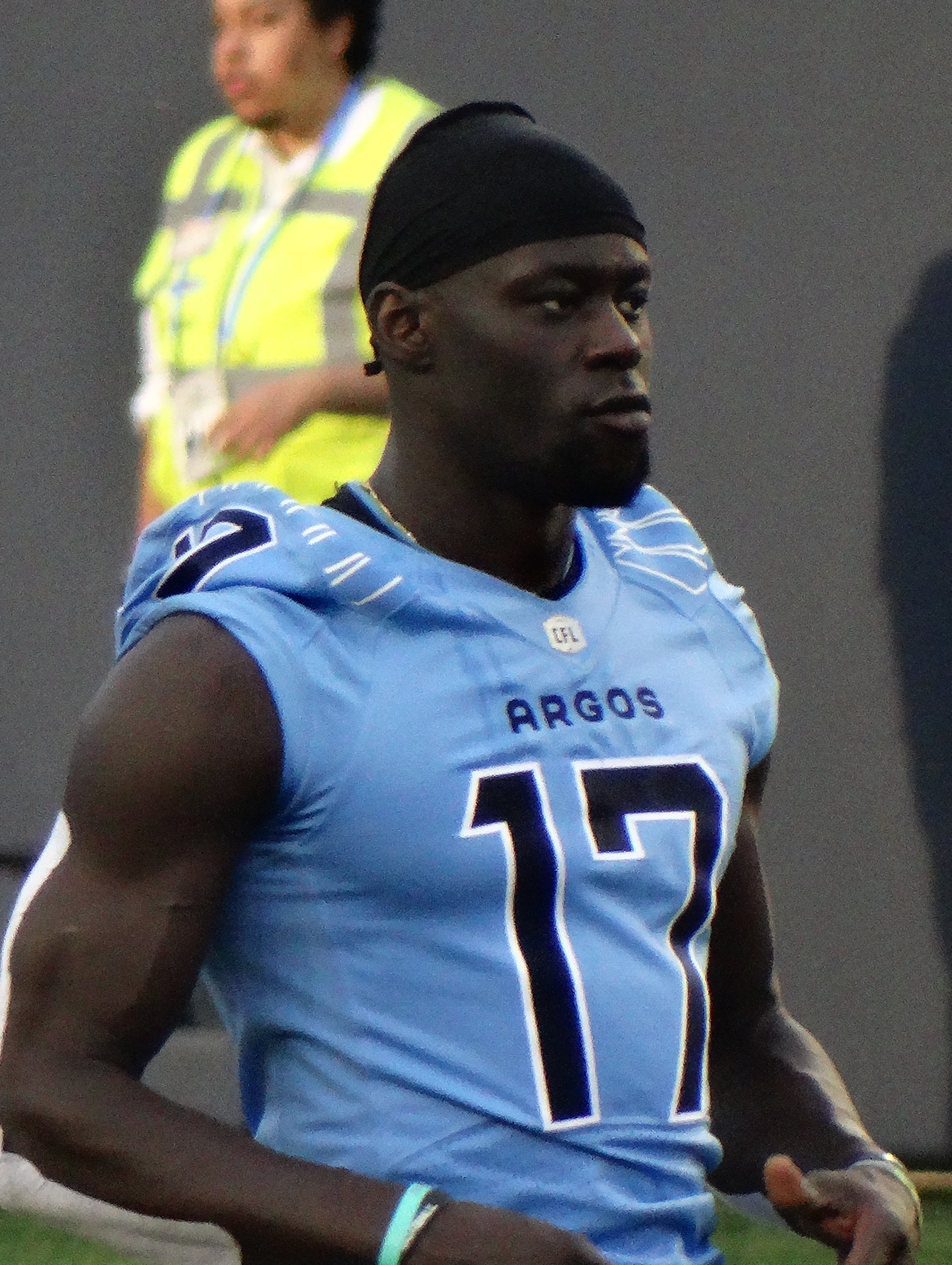
- Sindani with the Toronto Argonauts in 2024

Profile
- Position: Wide receiver

Personal information
- Born: June 23, 1995 (age 31); Regina, Saskatchewan, Canada
- Listed height: 6 ft 2 in (1.88 m)
- Listed weight: 204 lb (93 kg)

Career information
- High school: Campbell Collegiate
- CJFL: Calgary Colts
- University: Calgary; Regina
- CFL draft: 2017: 8th round, 70th overall pick

Career history
- 2017: Calgary Stampeders*
- 2018–2022: Calgary Stampeders
- 2023: New Orleans Breakers*
- 2023: Hamilton Tiger-Cats
- 2023–2024: Toronto Argonauts
- * Offseason or practice squad member only

Awards and highlights
- 2× Grey Cup champion (2018, 2024)
- Stats at CFL.ca

Richard Sindani (born June 23, 1995) is a Canadian former professional football wide receiver who played in six seasons in the Canadian Football League (CFL). He is a two-time Grey Cup champion after winning the 106th Grey Cup with the Calgary Stampeders and the 111th Grey Cup with the Toronto Argonauts. He played college football for the Regina Rams and Calgary Dinos and also played in the Canadian Junior Football League with the Calgary Colts.

== Amateur career ==
=== Regina Rams ===
Sindani played CIS football for the Regina Rams from 2013 to 2015 where he played in 20 regular season games. With the Rams, he recorded 33 receptions for 467 yards and three touchdowns.

=== Calgary Colts ===
In 2016, Sindani played for the Calgary Colts of the Canadian Junior Football League. He played in eight games and caught 31 passes for 414 yards and two touchdowns.

=== Calgary Dinos ===
Sindani transferred back to university football to play for the Calgary Dinos in 2017. With the Dinos, he played in six regular season games and had 23 receptions for 280 yards and one touchdown. He also played in the Dinos' Hardy Cup victory over the UBC Thunderbirds that year.

== Professional career ==
=== Calgary Stampeders ===
Sindani was drafted in the eighth round, 70th overall, by the Calgary Stampeders in the 2017 CFL draft and signed with the team on May 18, 2017. He played in two pre-season games for the Stampeders before going back to university football to play for the Calgary Dinos.

Sindani re-signed with the Stampeders on February 9, 2018. He made the team following training camp and dressed in his first professional game in the team's 2018 season opener on June 16, 2018, against the Hamilton Tiger-Cats. In that game, he also had his first career reception on a 13-yard catch. In total, he played in all 18 regular season games where he had eight receptions for 107 yards. The Stampeders finished in first place and Sindani played in his first post-season game, the West Final, where he had three catches for 44 yards in a Calgary victory. He then played in his first Grey Cup which was a Stampeder win over the Ottawa Redblacks in the 2018 championship game.

In 2019, Sindani's role in the Calgary offence grew as he played in fewer games (15), but had 32 catches for 362 yards that year. He earned his first career professional start at receiver on July 18, 2019, in a win over the Toronto Argonauts. He missed three games in September due to injury. He also played in the Stampeders' West Semi-Final loss to the Winnipeg Blue Bombers.

Sindani was scheduled for free agency in 2021, but decided to remain with Stampeders and was signed to a contract extension on January 22, 2021. He scored this first career touchdown on September 17, 2021, in a game against the Hamilton Tiger-Cats on a five-yard reception from Jake Maier. He played in all 14 regular season games where he had 26 catches for 262 yards and two touchdowns.

In the opening game of the 2022 season, on June 9, 2022, against the Montreal Alouettes, Sindani had a career high in both receptions and receiving yards as he had seven catches for 101 yards (his first 100-yard game) and led the team in both categories. On February 14, 2023, Sindani became a free agent upon the expiry of his contract.

=== New Orleans Breakers ===
On February 15, 2023, Sindani signed with the New Orleans Breakers of the United States Football League (USFL). He was transferred to the team's inactive list on March 19, 2023, and activated from the suspended list on March 26, 2023. He was released on April 4, 2023.

=== Hamilton Tiger-Cats ===
On April 28, 2023, it was announced that Sindani had signed with the Hamilton Tiger-Cats. He played in 12 games, starting in six, where he had 12 receptions for 90 yards. He was released on September 29, 2023.

=== Toronto Argonauts ===
On October 2, 2023, it was announced that Sindani had signed with the Toronto Argonauts. He played in three regular season games, with one start, where he had eight catches for 90 yards plus two special teams tackles.

In 2024, Sindani played and started in the first 14 regular season games before sitting out the last four games due to injury. In those games, he recorded 26 catches for 279 yards and one touchdown. He remained on the injured list throughout the post-season, including the 111th Grey Cup where the Argonauts' defeated the Winnipeg Blue Bombers 41–24. On February 28, 2025, it was reported that Sindani would not play in the 2025 season, despite being under contract, and was moved to the retired list.
