= Ucambre Williams =

American gridiron football player (born 1992)

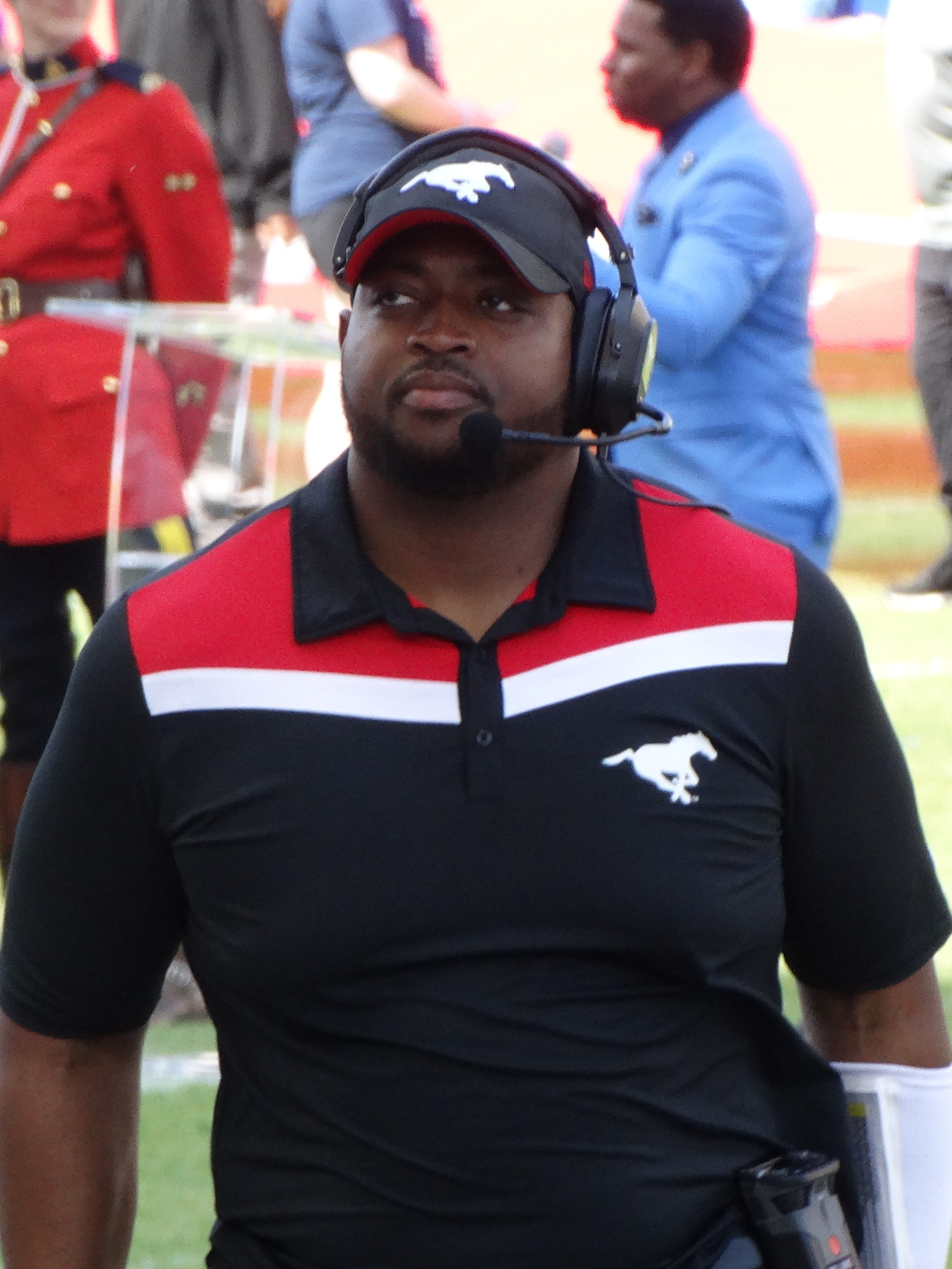
- Williams with the Calgary Stampeders in 2025

Calgary Stampeders
- Title: Running backs coach

Personal information
- Born: August 1, 1992 (age 34); Phenix City, Alabama, U.S.
- Listed height: 6 ft 3 in (1.91 m)
- Listed weight: 298 lb (135 kg)

Career information
- Position: Offensive lineman (No. 61)
- High school: Central High, Phenix City
- College: South Alabama

Career history

Playing
- 2016–2021: Calgary Stampeders
- 2022: Ottawa Redblacks

Coaching
- 2025–present: Calgary Stampeders

Awards and highlights
- Grey Cup champion (2018); CFL West All-Star (2017); 2× Second-team All-Sun Belt (2013, 2014)
- Stats at CFL.ca

Ucambre Jakieron Thembiance Williams (born August 1, 1992) is an American former professional football offensive lineman who is the running backs coach and assistant offensive line coach for the Calgary Stampeders of the Canadian Football League (CFL). He played for the Calgary Stampeders and Ottawa Redblacks of the CFL. He played college football at the University of South Alabama.

== College career ==
Williams played right tackle at University of South Alabama from 2011 to 2014. He played four games in his first season, and redshirted his sophomore year after suffered a season-ending injury in that season's fifth game. In his junior season he was named a second-team All-Sun Belt Conference selection. He was a first-team preseason pick the next year, but missed all of spring practice, recovering from surgery, though became a starter again after missing the first two games.

== Professional career ==
=== Calgary Stampeders ===
Williams was picked up by the Stampeders as a tackle in 2016. He played at right guard and, in the 2016 Grey Cup, as right tackle. In 2017, after a string of injuries among the offensive line, he was moved to centre, where coach Dave Dickenson called him a "quick learner". By the end of the season he was named the Stampedes' top offensive lineman, and best offensive lineman nominee for the CFL West Division. He was the starting centre on the team that won the 106th Grey Cup in 2018. He became a free agent upon the expiry of his contract on February 8, 2022.

=== Ottawa Redblacks ===
On February 8, 2022, it was announced that Williams had signed with the Ottawa Redblacks. Williams played in 11 games for the Redblacks during the 2022 season. After the season, in late November 2022, Williams posted on Facebook that he had attended a CFL retirement party in his honour: At the time he had not made any official announcement regarding his future On February 14, 2023, his contract expired and he became a free agent.

== Coaching career ==
Williams was named the running backs coach and assistant offensive line coach for the Calgary Stampeders on December 16, 2024.
