= Ryan Sceviour =

Canadian gridiron football player (born 1995)

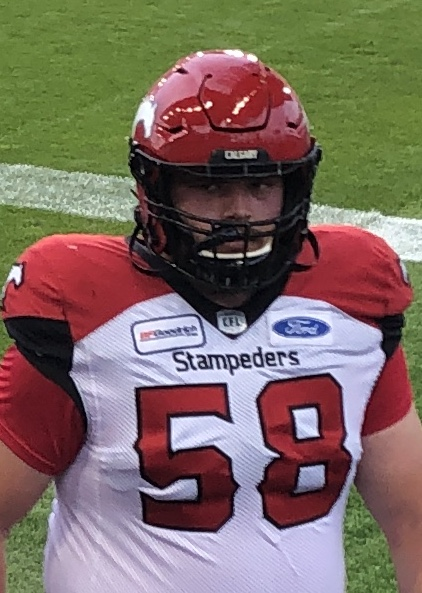
- Sceviour with the Calgary Stampeders in 2019

Profile
- Position: Offensive lineman

Personal information
- Born: June 29, 1995 (age 31); Calgary, Alberta, Canada
- Listed height: 6 ft 3 in (1.91 m)
- Listed weight: 303 lb (137 kg)

Career information
- High school: Bowness High
- College: Calgary
- CFL draft: 2018: 1st round, 8th overall pick

Career history
- 2018–2023: Calgary Stampeders
- 2024: Saskatchewan Roughriders
- 2025: Toronto Argonauts

Awards and highlights
- Grey Cup champion (2018); CFL West All-Star (2022)
- Stats at CFL.ca

Ryan Sceviour (born June 29, 1995) is a Canadian professional football offensive lineman. He was most recently a member of the Toronto Argonauts of the Canadian Football League (CFL).

== University career ==
Sceviour played U Sports football for the Calgary Dinos from 2013 to 2017.

== Professional career ==
Pre-draft measurables
Height	Weight	40-yard dash	20-yard shuttle	Three-cone drill	Vertical jump	Broad jump	Bench press
6 ft 3 1/4 in (1.91 m)	303 lb (137 kg)	5.61 s	4.75 s	8.24 s	23.5 in (0.60 m)	7 ft 8 1/2 in (2.35 m)	22 reps
All values from CFL Combine

=== Calgary Stampeders ===
Sceviour was drafted in the first round, eighth overall, by the Calgary Stampeders in the 2018 CFL draft and signed with the team on May 14, 2018. He spent most of the 2018 on the reserve roster, but dressed for one regular season game, making his professional debut on September 8, 2018. He was on the reserve roster when the Calgary Stampeders won the 106th Grey Cup. For the 2019 season, Sceviour became a regular starter, playing and starting in all 18 regular season games and one playoff game. He did not play in 2020 due to the cancellation of the 2020 CFL season. He later re-signed with the Stampeders on January 8, 2021.

In 2022, Sceviour played and started in all 18 regular season games and was named a Divisional All-Star for the first time in his career. In 2023, he again made 18 starts at right guard. Sceviour became a free agent upon the expiry of his contract on February 13, 2024.

=== Saskatchewan Roughriders ===
On February 16, 2024, the Saskatchewan Roughriders announced that Sceviour had signed with the team. On February 11, 2025, he became a free agent.

=== Toronto Argonauts ===
On August 5, 2025, it was announced that Sceviour had signed with the Toronto Argonauts. However, he did not dress in a game and he became a free agent upon the expiry of his contract on February 10, 2026.
