= Nila Kasitati =

Tongan football player (born 1993)

No. 62
- Position: Offensive lineman

Personal information
- Born: April 25, 1993 (age 33); American Samoa
- Listed height: 6 ft 4 in (1.93 m)
- Listed weight: 331 lb (150 kg)

Career information
- High school: Trinity (Euless, Texas, U.S.)
- College: Oklahoma (2011–2015)
- NFL draft: 2016: undrafted

Career history
- Washington Redskins (2016)*; Jacksonville Jaguars (2016)*; Calgary Stampeders (2018–2021)
- * Offseason or practice squad member only

Awards and highlights
- Grey Cup champion (2018); First-team All-Big 12 (2015)
- Stats at Pro Football Reference
- Stats at CFL.ca

William Nila Kasitati (NEE-luh-kah-sih-TAH-tee; born April 25, 1993) is a Tongan former professional gridiron football offensive lineman who played for the Calgary Stampeders of the Canadian Football League (CFL). He played college football at Oklahoma.

== Early life ==
William Nila Kasitati was born on April 25, 1993, in American Samoa. He did not play American football until his sophomore year of high school in American Samoa. His family moved to Euless, Texas, and Kasitati finished his high school football career at Trinity High School. He caught 10 passes for 180 yards and one touchdown his senior year in 2010. In the class of 2011, he was rated a three-star recruit by Rivals.com, Scout.com, and ESPN.com. Kasitati was also ranked the No. 38 tight end in the country by ESPN, Scout, and 247Sports, and the No. 50 offensive lineman in the country by Rivals.

== College career ==
Kasitati played college football for the Oklahoma Sooners of the University of Oklahoma as an offensive guard. He redshirted the 2011 season. He played in four games in 2012 before suffering a season-ending injury. Kasitati appeared in all 13 games, starting seven at right guard, in 2013. He played in 12 games, starting six at right guard, during the 2014 season while missing one game due to injury. He was named honorable mention All-Big 12 by the coaches and also earned second-team Academic All-Big 12 honors. Kasitati started all 13 games at right guard as a redshirt senior in 2015, garnering first-team All-Big 12 and second-team Academic All-Big 12 recognition. He majored in human relations at Oklahoma.

== Professional career ==
After going undrafted in the 2016 NFL draft, Kasitati signed with the Washington Redskins on May 16, 2016. He was waived on September 3 and signed to the practice squad the next day. He was released on September 13, 2016.

Kasitati was signed to the Jacksonville Jaguars' practice squad on December 14, 2016. He signed a futures contract with Jacksonville on January 2, 2017. He was later waived on September 2, 2017.

Kasitati signed with the Calgary Stampeders of the Canadian Football League (CFL) on May 10, 2018. He was moved between the practice roster and active roster several times during the 2018 season. He played in four games, all starts, overall in 2018. On November 25, 2018, the Stampeders won the 106th Grey Cup against the Ottawa Redblacks by a score of 27–16. Kasitati started 16 games for Calgary in 2019 as the team went 12–6. He also had a short stint on the injured list. He re-signed with the Stampeders on January 22, 2020. However, the 2020 CFL season was cancelled due to the COVID-19 pandemic. Kasitati re-signed with Calgary again the next year on January 18, 2021. He retired on July 10, 2021, before the start of training camp. He unretired on August 24, 2021. He played in seven games, all starts, for the Stampeders in 2021 and also had a stint on the practice roster and two stints on the injured list. Kasitati became a free agent after the 2021 season.

== Personal life ==
Kasitati speaks English, Tongan, and a little Samoan.
