= 2025 Toronto Argonauts season =

CFL team season

- General manager: Michael Clemons
- Head coach: Ryan Dinwiddie
- Home stadium: BMO Field

Results
- Record: 5–13
- Division place: 3rd, East
- Playoffs: Did not qualify
- Team MOP: Nick Arbuckle
- Team MODP: Cameron Judge
- Team MOC: Kevin Mital
- Team MOOL: Peter Nicastro
- Team MOST: Lirim Hajrullahu
- Team MOR: Derek Slywka

Uniform
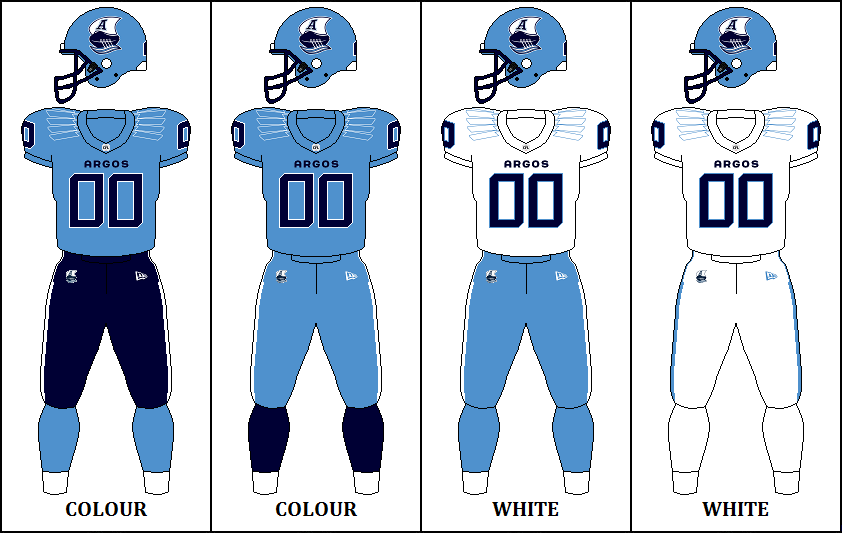

The 2025 Toronto Argonauts season was the 67th season for the team in the Canadian Football League (CFL) and their 152nd year of existence. The Argonauts entered the season as defending Grey Cup champions, but were eliminated from post-season contention following their week 18 loss to the Hamilton Tiger-Cats making it their first season since 2019 in which they missed the playoffs. The team finished in third place in the East Division with a 5–13 record.

The 2025 CFL season was the fifth season for head coach Ryan Dinwiddie and the sixth season for Michael Clemons as general manager.

The Toronto Argonauts drew an average home attendance of 15,109, the lowest in the CFL.

== Offseason ==
=== CFL global draft ===
The 2025 CFL global draft took place on April 29, 2025. The Argonauts had two selections in the draft, holding the ninth pick in each round.

Round	Pick	Player	Position	School	Nationality
1	9	Valentin Senn	OL	Connecticut	Austria
2	18	Soane Toia	DL	San Jose State	Tonga

== CFL national draft ==
The 2025 CFL draft took place on April 29, 2025. The Argonauts had eight selections in the eight-round draft. Not including traded picks or forfeitures, the team selected ninth in each round of the draft due to their victory in the 111th Grey Cup game.

Round	Pick	Player	Position	School	Hometown
1	7	Jeremiah Ojo	DL	Montreal	Montreal, QC
2	19	Paris Shand	DL	Louisiana State	Toronto, ON
4	29	Gavin Coakes	OL	British Columbia	Winnipeg, MB
4	30	Istvan Assibo-Dadzie	DB	Windsor	Brampton, ON
5	46	Jaylen Rayam	LB	Texas–El Paso	Alabaster, AL, USA
6	55	Joey Zorn	RB	Windsor	Flint, MI, USA
7	64	Ethan Pyle	OL	Guelph	Milton, ON
8	72	DeEmetrius Masuka	DB	McMaster	Hamilton, ON

== Preseason ==
The Argonauts' home preseason game was played at Alumni Stadium in Guelph, Ontario.

=== Schedule ===
Week	Game	Date	Kickoff	Opponent	Results		TV	Venue	Attendance	Summary
Week	Game	Date	Kickoff	Opponent	Score	Record	TV	Venue	Attendance	Summary
A	Bye									
B	1	Sat, May 24	7:00 p.m. EDT	at Hamilton Tiger-Cats	L 16–24	0–1	TSN2	Hamilton Stadium	17,411	Recap
C	2	Fri, May 30	7:00 p.m. EDT	vs. Hamilton Tiger-Cats	W 30–23	1–1	CFL+	Alumni Stadium	4,000	Recap

# Games played with white uniforms.

== Regular season ==
=== Standings ===
East Division
Team	GP	W	L	T	Pts	PF	PA	Div	Stk	
Hamilton Tiger-Cats	18	11	7	0	22	525	496	7–1	W1	Details
Montreal Alouettes	18	10	8	0	20	445	430	6–2	L1	Details
Toronto Argonauts	18	5	13	0	10	497	583	2–6	L5	Details
Ottawa Redblacks	18	4	14	0	8	417	537	1–7	L6	Details

=== Schedule ===
Week	Game	Date	Kickoff	Opponent	Results		TV	Venue	Attendance	Summary
Week	Game	Date	Kickoff	Opponent	Score	Record	TV	Venue	Attendance	Summary
1	1	Fri, June 6	7:30 p.m. EDT	at Montreal Alouettes	L 10–28	0–1	TSN/RDS	Molson Stadium	21,480	Recap
2	2	Sat, June 14	4:00 p.m. EDT	vs. Calgary Stampeders	L 19–29	0–2	TSN/CBSSN	BMO Field	17,902	Recap
3	3	Fri, June 20	7:30 p.m. EDT	vs. Saskatchewan Roughriders	L 32–39	0–3	TSN/RDS	BMO Field	12,025	Recap
4	4	Sun, June 29	7:00 p.m. EDT	at Ottawa Redblacks	W 29–16	1–3	TSN/RDS Info/CBSSN	TD Place Stadium	17,700	Recap
5	5	Fri, July 4	7:30 p.m. EDT	vs. Hamilton Tiger-Cats	L 38–51	1–4	TSN/RDS	BMO Field	12,701	Recap
6	Bye									
7	6	Thu, July 17	7:30 p.m. EDT	at Montreal Alouettes	L 25–26	1–5	TSN/RDS/CBSSN	Molson Stadium	19,354	Recap
8	7	Sat, July 26	7:00 p.m. EDT	vs. Winnipeg Blue Bombers	W 31–17	2–5	TSN/CTV/CBSSN	BMO Field	13,266	Recap
9	8	Fri, Aug 1	8:30 p.m. EDT	at Winnipeg Blue Bombers	L 31–40	2–6	TSN	Princess Auto Stadium	32,343	Recap
10	9	Sat, Aug 9	3:00 p.m. EDT	vs. Ottawa Redblacks	L 42–46	2–7	TSN/CTV/RDS/CBSSN	BMO Field	13,297	Recap
11	10	Fri, Aug 15	9:00 p.m. EDT	at Edmonton Elks	L 20–28	2–8	TSN	Commonwealth Stadium	16,526	Recap
12	11	Sat, Aug 23	3:00 p.m. EDT	vs. BC Lions	W 52–34	3–8	TSN/CTV	BMO Field	18,354	Recap
13	12	Mon, Sept 1	2:30 p.m. EDT	at Hamilton Tiger-Cats	W 35–33	4–8	TSN/CBSSN	Hamilton Stadium	25,619	Recap
14	Bye									
15	13	Sat, Sept 13	3:00 p.m. EDT	vs. Edmonton Elks	W 31–30	5–8	TSN/CTV	BMO Field	14,742	Recap
16	14	Fri, Sept 19	7:00 p.m. EDT	vs. Montreal Alouettes	L 19–21	5–9	TSN/RDS	BMO Field	13,848	Recap
17	15	Fri, Sept 26	10:00 p.m. EDT	at BC Lions	L 22–27	5–10	TSN	BC Place	22,070	Recap
18	16	Sat, Oct 4	3:00 p.m. EDT	vs. Hamilton Tiger-Cats	L 29–47	5–11	TSN/CTV	BMO Field	19,846	Recap
19	17	Fri, Oct 10	9:00 p.m. EDT	at Saskatchewan Roughriders	L 19–27	5–12	TSN/RDS	Mosaic Stadium	27,500	Recap
20	18	Sat, Oct 18	7:00 p.m. EDT	at Calgary Stampeders	L 13–44	5–13	TSN	McMahon Stadium	22,528	Recap
21	Bye									

# Games played with colour uniforms.
# Games played with white uniforms.

== Roster ==
2025 Toronto Argonauts final roster
**Quarterbacks**: 7 Jarret Doege; 19 Max Duggan; 5 Tucker Horn; **Running backs**: 21 Spencer Brown; 38 Félix Garand-Gauthier; 24 Deonta McMahon; **Receivers**: 18 Dejon Brissett; 3 Janarion Grant; 87 Jake Herslow; 10 Kevin Mital; 15 Makai Polk; 84 Ezechiel Tieide; 83 David Ungerer	**Offensive linemen**: 51 John Bosse G/T; 53 Darius Ciraco C; 62 Ryan Hunter T/G; 61 Brandon Kemp T; 52 Peter Nicastro C; 66 Shane Richards T; 58 Anthony Vandal G; **Defensive linemen**: 77 Brevin Allen DE; 78 Ricky Correia DT; 98 Da'Marcus Johnson DE; 97 Derek Parish DE; 79 J-Min Pelley DT; 99 Greg Reaves DE; 95 Joe Wallace DT	**Linebackers**: 36 Aaron Casey; 45 Jack Cassar; 35 Isaac Darkangelo; 26 Brian Harelimana; 8 Cameron Judge; 34 Stephen Smith; **Defensive backs**: 0 Tyshon Blackburn; 6 Branden Dozier; 39 Willie Drew; 23 Benjie Franklin; 14 Delonte Hood; 2 Tarvarus McFadden; 20 Derek Slywka	**Special teams**: 46 Simon Chaves LS; 71 Alfredo Gachuz Lozada K; 47 Adam Guillemette LS; 29 John Haggerty P; 7 Lirim Hajrullahu K; **Practice roster**: 13 Peny Boone RB; 54 Dre Doiron C; 67 Joshua Donovan T; 68 Hampton Ergle T; 82 Tyler Kahmann WR; 25 Nic Toomer DB; **Suspended list**: Andre Carter DT	**Injured list**: 81 Dorian Anderson WR; 4 Nick Arbuckle QB; 9 Darrius Bratton DB; 94 Andrew Chatfield DE; 93 Demarcus Christmas DT; 40 Bryan Cox Jr. DE; 86 Damonte Coxie WR; 80 DaVaris Daniels WR; 65 Anim Dankwah T; 63 Sage Doxtater G; 41 Jonathan Edouard DB; 33 Kenneth George DB; 64 Dylan Giffen G; 90 Thiadric Hansen DE; 49 Jordan Herdman-Reed LB; 96 Tyson Hergott DE; 12 Chad Kelly QB; 91 Anthony Lanier DT; 48 Wynton McManis LB; 56 George Moore T; 44 Jeremiah Ojo DE; 57 Ryan Sceviour G; 42 Ryder Varga LB; 28 Miyan Williams RB
Italics indicate American player • **Bold** indicates Global player

== Coaching staff ==
Toronto Argonauts staff
Front office and support staff: Owner – Maple Leaf Sports & Entertainment; President – Vacant; General Manager – Michael Clemons; Assistant General Manager – John Murphy; Pro Player Personnel Assistant – Jason Shivers; Head Athletic Therapist – Josh Shewell; Assistant Athletic Therapist – Mark Belmore; Equipment Manager – Danny Webb; Assistant Equipment Manager – David Sillberg; Strength and Conditioning – Usama Mujtaba; Manager, Football Media – Chris Balenovich; Manager, Communications – Mike Hogan	Head Coaches: Head Coach/Offensive Coordinator – Ryan Dinwiddie; Offensive coaches: Pass Game Coordinator and Receivers – Pete Costanza; Offensive Line – Kris Sweet; Quarterbacks – Mike Miller; Running backs – Dominic Picard; Offensive assistant – Drew Tate; Defensive coaches: Co-Defensive Coordinator and Linebackers – Kevin Eiben; Co-Defensive Coordinator and Defensive Backs – Jason Shivers; Defensive Line – Greg Marshall; Special teams coaches: Special Teams Coordinator – Mickey Donovan; → Coaching staff
