= 2024 Toronto Argonauts season =

CFL team season

- General manager: Michael Clemons
- President: Bill Manning (until July 11, 2024)
- Head coach: Ryan Dinwiddie
- Home stadium: BMO Field

Results
- Record: 10–8
- Division place: 2nd, East
- Playoffs: Won Grey Cup
- Team MOP: Ka’Deem Carey
- Team MODP: DaShaun Amos
- Team MOC: Lirim Hajrullahu
- Team MOOL: Ryan Hunter
- Team MOST: Janarion Grant
- Team MOR: Makai Polk

Uniform
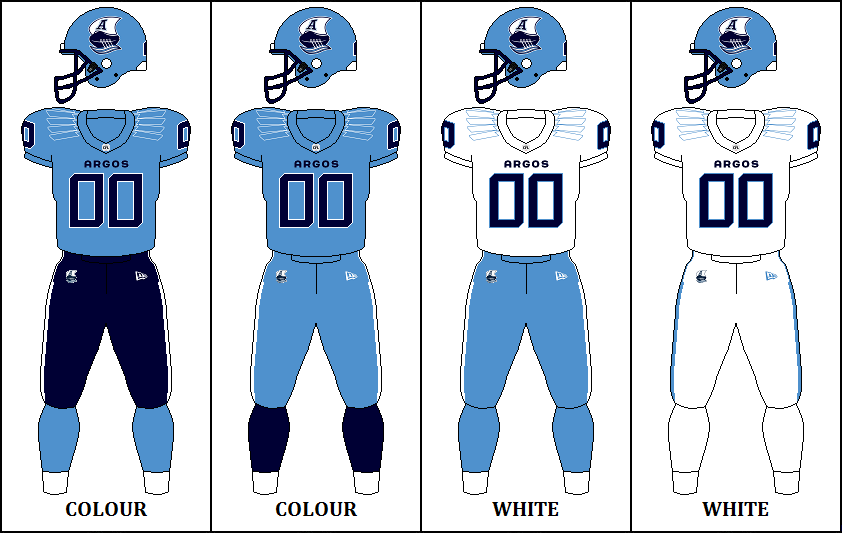

The 2024 Toronto Argonauts season was the 66th season for the team in the Canadian Football League (CFL) and their 151st year of existence. The Argonauts qualified for the playoffs for the fourth consecutive year with a win on October 11 over the Winnipeg Blue Bombers. The team won their 19th Grey Cup championship after defeating the Blue Bombers in the 111th Grey Cup game.

The 2024 CFL season was the fourth season for head coach Ryan Dinwiddie and the fifth season for Michael Clemons as general manager.

On July 11, 2024, team owners, Maple Leaf Sports & Entertainment (MLSE), parted ways with team president, Bill Manning, and stated that Clemons would report directly to MLSE President, Keith Pelley.

The Toronto Argonauts drew an average home attendance of 15,129 in 2024.

== Offseason ==
=== CFL global draft ===
The 2024 CFL global draft took place on April 30, 2024. The Argonauts had two picks in the draft, selecting seventh in each round.

Round	Pick	Player	Position	Club/School	Nationality
1	7	Jeremy Edwards	P	Eastern Kentucky	Australia
2	16	Denzel Daxon	DL	Illinois	Bahamas

== CFL national draft ==
The 2024 CFL draft took place on April 30, 2024. The Argonauts had nine selections in the eight-round draft. Through a series of trades with Hamilton and Edmonton, the Argonauts improved their first-round pick by two spots, and had three selections in the third round and two each in the fifth and sixth rounds.

Round	Pick	Player	Position	School	Hometown
1	5	Kevin Mital	WR	Laval	Saint-Agapit, QC
3	24	Tyson Hergott	DL	Waterloo	Waterloo, ON
3	25	John Bosse	OL	Calgary	Calgary, AB
3	27	Tyshon Blackburn	DB	Alberta	Calgary, AB
5	39	Jerrell Cummings	DB	British Columbia	Vancouver, BC
5	45	Ifenna Onyeka	DL	Carleton	Brampton, ON
6	48	Anim Dankwah	OL	Howard	Toronto, ON
6	54	Justin Sambu	DL	Baylor	Calgary, AB
8	72	Daniel Shin	OL	Alberta	Edmonton, AB

== Preseason ==
The Argonauts' home preseason game was played at Alumni Stadium in Guelph, Ontario.

=== Schedule ===
Week	Game	Date	Kickoff	Opponent	Results		TV	Venue	Attendance	Summary
Week	Game	Date	Kickoff	Opponent	Score	Record	TV	Venue	Attendance	Summary
A	Bye									
B	1	Sat, May 25	7:30 p.m. EDT	at Montreal Alouettes	L 13–30	0–1	RDS/CFL+	Molson Stadium	13,787	Recap
C	2	Fri, May 31	7:00 p.m. EDT	vs. Hamilton Tiger-Cats	W 25–14	1–1	CFL+	Alumni Stadium	N/A	Recap

# Games played with white uniforms.

== Regular season ==
=== Standings ===
East Division
Team	GP	W	L	T	Pts	PF	PA	Div	Stk	
Montreal Alouettes	18	12	5	1	25	455	404	6–2	L2	Details
Toronto Argonauts	18	10	8	0	20	513	479	3–5	L1	Details
Ottawa Redblacks	18	9	8	1	19	443	488	3–5	W1	Details
Hamilton Tiger-Cats	18	7	11	0	14	495	557	4–4	L1	Details

=== Schedule ===
The Argonauts are scheduled to play nine regular season home games in Toronto for the first time since 2018. The team was the designated host for Touchdown Atlantic games in 2019, 2022, and 2023, while the 2020 CFL season was cancelled and the 2021 CFL season had every team hosting seven home games.

Week	Game	Date	Kickoff	Opponent	Results		TV	Venue	Attendance	Summary
Week	Game	Date	Kickoff	Opponent	Score	Record	TV	Venue	Attendance	Summary
1	1	Sun, June 9	7:00 p.m. EDT	vs. BC Lions	W 35–27	1–0	TSN/CBSSN	BMO Field	12,767	Recap
2	Bye									
3	2	Sat, June 22	7:00 p.m. EDT	vs. Edmonton Elks	W 39–36	2–0	TSN/RDS/CBSSN	BMO Field	10,857	Recap
4	3	Fri, June 28	7:30 p.m. EDT	vs. Montreal Alouettes	L 20–30	2–1	TSN/RDS	BMO Field	11,165	Recap
5	4	Thu, July 4	9:00 p.m. EDT	at Saskatchewan Roughriders	L 23–30	2–2	TSN	Mosaic Stadium	23,923	Recap
6	5	Thu, July 11	7:30 p.m. EDT	at Montreal Alouettes	W 37–18	3–2	TSN/RDS	Molson Stadium	18,088	Recap
7	6	Sat, July 20	7:00 p.m. EDT	at Hamilton Tiger-Cats	L 24–27	3–3	TSN/RDS2/CBSSN	Tim Hortons Field	22,910	Recap
8	7	Sat, July 27	7:00 p.m. EDT	vs. Winnipeg Blue Bombers	W 16–14 (OT)	4–3	TSN/CBSSN	BMO Field	14,994	Recap
9	8	Sun, Aug 4	7:00 p.m. EDT	at Calgary Stampeders	L 23–27	4–4	TSN	McMahon Stadium	19,914	Recap
10	9	Fri, Aug 9	7:30 p.m. EDT	vs. Calgary Stampeders	W 39–25	5–4	TSN	BMO Field	13,481	Recap
11	Bye									
12	10	Thu, Aug 22	7:30 p.m. EDT	vs. Saskatchewan Roughriders	W 20–19	6–4	TSN/RDS	BMO Field	19,327	Recap
13	11	Mon, Sept 2	2:30 p.m. EDT	at Hamilton Tiger-Cats	L 28–31	6–5	TSN/RDS2/CBSSN	Tim Hortons Field	25,291	Recap
14	12	Sat, Sept 7	1:00 p.m. EDT	at Ottawa Redblacks	L 27–41	6–6	TSN/RDS	TD Place Stadium	17,834	Recap
15	13	Fri, Sept 13	10:00 p.m. EDT	at BC Lions	W 33–17	7–6	TSN/CBSSN	BC Place	20,683	Recap
16	14	Fri, Sept 20	7:00 p.m. EDT	vs. Hamilton Tiger-Cats	L 31–33	7–7	TSN/RDS	BMO Field	18,210	Recap
17	15	Sat, Sept 28	7:00 p.m. EDT	vs. Montreal Alouettes	W 37–31	8–7	TSN/RDS	BMO Field	14,856	Recap
18	Bye									
19	16	Fri, Oct 11	8:30 p.m. EDT	at Winnipeg Blue Bombers	W 14–11	9–7	TSN/RDS2	Princess Auto Stadium	32,343	Recap
20	17	Sat, Oct 19	3:00 p.m. EDT	vs. Ottawa Redblacks	W 38–31	10–7	CTV	BMO Field	20,487	Recap
21	18	Fri, Oct 25	9:30 p.m. EDT	at Edmonton Elks	L 30–31 (OT)	10–8	TSN	Commonwealth Stadium	15,069	Recap

# Games played with colour uniforms.
# Games played with white uniforms.

== Post-season ==
=== Schedule ===
Game	Date	Kickoff	Opponent	Results		TV	Venue	Attendance	Summary
Game	Date	Kickoff	Opponent	Score	Record	TV	Venue	Attendance	Summary
East Semi-Final	Sat, Nov 2	3:00 p.m. EDT	vs. Ottawa Redblacks	W 58–38	1–0	CTV/TSN/RDS	BMO Field	18,060	Recap
East Final	Sat, Nov 9	3:00 p.m. EST	at Montreal Alouettes	W 30–28	2–0	CTV/TSN/RDS	Molson Stadium	23,035	Recap
111th Grey Cup	Sun, Nov 17	6:00 p.m. EST	Winnipeg Blue Bombers	W 41–24	3–0	CTV/TSN/RDS	BC Place	52,439	Recap

# Games played with colour uniforms.
# Games played with white uniforms.

== Roster ==
2024 Toronto Argonauts final roster
**Quarterbacks**: 4 Nick Arbuckle; 11 Cameron Dukes; 5 Bryan Scott; **Running backs**: 21 Daniel Adeboboye; 25 Ka'Deem Carey; 24 Deonta McMahon; **Receivers**: 18 Dejon Brissett; 86 Damonte Coxie; 80 DaVaris Daniels; 3 Janarion Grant; 10 Kevin Mital; 15 Makai Polk; 83 David Ungerer	**Offensive linemen**: 59 Dejon Allen T; 64 Dylan Giffen G; 62 Ryan Hunter G/T; 67 Gregor MacKellar G; 52 Peter Nicastro C; 65 Landon Rice T/G; 58 Anthony Vandal G/C; **Defensive linemen**: 91 Jared Brinkman DT; 94 Jake Ceresna DT/DE; 90 Thiadric Hansen DE; 99 Ralph Holley DT; 7 Folarin Orimolade DE; 98 Derek Parish DE; 40 Robbie Smith DE; 95 Jordan Williams DT	**Linebackers**: 45 Jack Cassar; 35 Isaac Darkangelo; 26 Brian Harelimana; 48 Wynton McManis; 32 Fraser Sopik; **Defensive backs**: 3 Tunde Adeleke; 8 DaShaun Amos; 0 Tyshon Blackburn; 34 Kerfalla Exumé; 23 Benjie Franklin; 2 Tarvarus McFadden; 9 Royce Metchie; 27 Mark Milton; 19 Robert Priester	**Special teams**: 47 Adam Guillemette LS; 29 John Haggerty P; 7 Lirim Hajrullahu K/P; **Practice roster**: 51 John Bosse T/G; 46 Simon Chaves LS; 63 Sage Doxtater T; 39 Willie Drew DB; 41 Jonathan Edouard DB; 72 Jeremy Edwards P; 71 Alfredo Gachuz Lozada K; 43 Clayton Glasco LB; 96 Tyson Hergott DE; 87 Jake Herslow WR; 56 George Moore T; 92 Baptiste Pollier DE; 82 Derek Slywka DB	**Injured list**: 93 Woody Baron DT; 66 Isiah Cage T; 44 Brandon Calver FB; 53 Darius Ciraco C; 33 Kenneth George DB; 12 Chad Kelly QB; 38 Jamie Harry DB; 30 Jonathan Jones LB; 49 Daniel Kwamou LB; 20 Quincy Mauger DB; 81 Tommy Nield SB; 17 Richie Sindani WR; **Suspended list**: Isaiah Bowser RB; DeAndre Torrey RB
Italics indicate American player • **Bold** indicates Global player

== Coaching staff ==
Toronto Argonauts staff
Front office and support staff: Owner – Maple Leaf Sports & Entertainment; President – Vacant; General Manager – Michael Clemons; Assistant General Manager – John Murphy; Head Athletic Therapist – Josh Shewell; Assistant Athletic Therapist – Mark Belmore; Equipment Manager – Danny Webb; Assistant Equipment Manager – David Sillberg; Strength and Conditioning – Usama Mujtaba; Manager, Football Media – Chris Balenovich; Manager, Communications – Mike Hogan	Head Coaches: Head Coach/Offensive Coordinator – Ryan Dinwiddie; Offensive coaches: Pass Game Coordinator and Receivers – Pete Costanza; Offensive Line – Kris Sweet; Quarterbacks – Mike Miller; Running backs – Dominic Picard; Offensive assistant – Drew Tate; Defensive coaches: Co-Defensive Coordinator and Linebackers – Kevin Eiben; Co-Defensive Coordinator and Secondary – William Fields; Defensive Line – Demetrious Maxie; Defensive Backs – Myron Lewis; Special teams coaches: Special Teams Coordinator – Mickey Donovan; → Coaching staff
