= Alfredo Gachuz Lozada =

Mexican gridiron football player (born 1999)

Profile
- Position: Placekicker

Personal information
- Born: 1 January 1999 (age 27); Mexico
- Listed height: 5 ft 10 in (1.78 m)
- Listed weight: 225 lb (102 kg)

Career information
- College: ITESM CEM
- CFL draft: 2023G: 1st round, 9th overall pick

Career history
- 2022–2023: Raptors de Naucalpan
- 2023–2025: Toronto Argonauts

Awards and highlights
- Grey Cup champion (2024)

Alfredo Gachuz Lozada (born 1 January 1999) is a Mexican professional gridiron football placekicker for the Toronto Argonauts of the Canadian Football League (CFL). He played college football for Borregos Salvajes CEM and later professionally in the Liga de Fútbol Americano Profesional (LFA) with the Raptors de Naucalpan. He is a Grey Cup champion after winning with the Argonauts in 2024.

== Early life and education ==
Gachuz was born on 1 January 1999 in Mexico. He grew up in Aguascalientes. He attended the Monterrey Institute of Technology and Higher Education where he studied civil engineering. He was a standout placekicker in college football for Borregos Salvajes CEM of the Organización Nacional Estudiantil de Fútbol Americano (ONEFA). A five-time league scoring leader, he finished second in league history in field goals made and converted a record 61-yard game-winning field goal in 2021.

== Professional career ==
Gachuz was selected in the second round (10th overall) of the 2022 Liga de Fútbol Americano Profesional (LFA) Draft by the Raptors de Naucalpan. Playing two years for the team, he was twice an LFA all-star.

Gachuz, who trains with Nick Novak, was invited to a camp in Mexico City featuring the best 11 Mexican placekickers, hosted by the Pittsburgh Steelers. He made a 58-yard field goal at the event and was given an award as the best participant. His performance there led to an invite to be at the Steelers' rookie minicamp, held in May 2023. He ultimately was not signed by the Steelers.

Although not signed by the Steelers, Gachuz was chosen by the Toronto Argonauts of the Canadian Football League (CFL) in the first round (ninth overall) of the 2023 CFL global draft, being the only Mexican chosen. He signed with the Argonauts and was placed on the practice roster to begin the season. He was promoted to the active roster on October 20. He made his CFL debut the following day against the Saskatchewan Roughriders, making three of four field goal attempts with a long of 33 and two of three extra points attempted. He returned to the practice roster after the game. He was re-signed following the 2023 season. During the off-season, he returned to Mexico and opened a kicking camp in Mexico City.

Gachuz was placed on the practice roster to open the 2024 season. He remained on the practice roster for the entire regular season and post-season, including when the Argonauts defeated the Winnipeg Blue Bombers in the 111th Grey Cup. He became a free agent the day after the Grey Cup game when his contract expired, but signed again with the Argonauts on November 27, 2024.

Gachuz spent most of the 2025 season on the practice roster, but dressed for the final game of the season against the Calgary Stampeders as a backup. He was later released on October 25, 2025.
