= 111th Grey Cup =

2024 Canadian Football championship game

Toronto Argonauts	Winnipeg Blue Bombers
(10–8)	(11–7)
41	24
Head coach: Ryan Dinwiddie	Head coach: Mike O'Shea
	1	2	3	4	Total
Toronto Argonauts	3	6	8	24	41
Winnipeg Blue Bombers	7	3	3	11	24
- Date: November 17, 2024
- Stadium: BC Place
- Location: Vancouver
- Most Valuable Player: Nick Arbuckle, QB (Argonauts)
- Most Valuable Canadian: Dejon Brissett, WR (Argonauts)
- Favourite: Blue Bombers by 9 1/2
- National anthem: Sofia Camara
- Coin toss: Lucas Matheson
- Referee: Ben Major
- Halftime show: Jonas Brothers
- Attendance: 52,349

Broadcasters
- Network: Canada (English): CTV, TSN; Canada (French): RDS; U.S. (English): CBS Sports Network; Worldwide: CFL+
- Announcers: Rod Smith (TSN play-by-play); Glen Suitor (TSN analyst); Claire Hanna (TSN sideline reporter); Matthew Scianitti (TSN sideline reporter); David Arsenault (RDS play-by-play); Pierre Vercheval (RDS analyst); Didier Orméjuste (RDS sideline reporter)

The 111th Grey Cup was played to decide the Canadian Football League (CFL) championship for the 2024 season. The game was played on November 17, 2024, at BC Place Stadium in Vancouver, British Columbia. The Toronto Argonauts defeated the Winnipeg Blue Bombers 41–24 to win their league-leading 19th Grey Cup championship. It was the Argonauts' second victory in three years while it was the Blue Bombers' fifth consecutive appearance in the championship game, but also their third straight loss. This was the 17th time that Vancouver has hosted the Grey Cup, the previous having been in 2014.

== Host ==
On November 3, 2022, it was announced that the game had been awarded to the city of Vancouver and the host BC Lions. The Winnipeg Blue Bombers were reportedly also bidding to host this game, but also submitted a bid for the 112th Grey Cup game. The 111th Grey Cup and its associated pre-game festivities were reported after the game to have brought $121.9 million in economic impact to Vancouver.

== Date ==
Per the latest Collective Bargaining Agreement signed in 2022, the league had the option of starting the 2024 season by up to 30 days sooner, which could have significantly altered the date of this game. However, the league chose to continue with the existing scheduling formula and confirmed that the game would be played on November 17, 2024 (the third Sunday of November).

== Entertainment ==
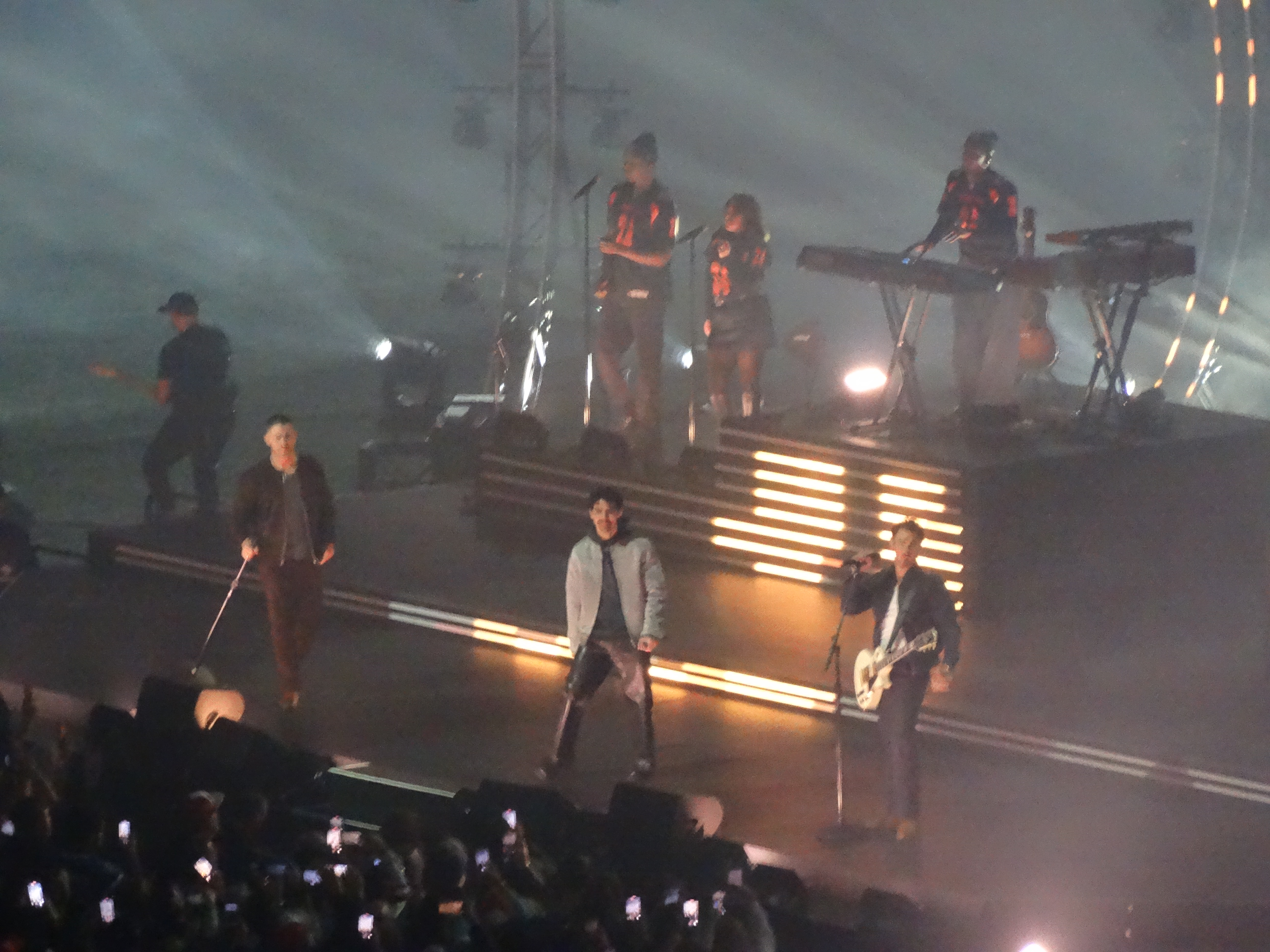
The Jonas Brothers performed at the halftime show.

Canadian country singer Owen Riegling performed during the SiriusXM Kickoff Show and Canadian pop singer Sofia Camara sang the national anthem backed by a guitarist, violinist, and a celloist. American pop rock trio Jonas Brothers performed during the Twisted Tea Halftime Show; they performed shortened versions of eight of their songs, including "What a Man Gotta Do" and "Sucker" as well as Nick's solo song "Jealous" and "Cake by the Ocean" by Joe's band DNCE.

== Broadcasting ==
The game was televised in Canada nationally on TSN, and RDS, with a free over-the-air telecast—the first since the 95th Grey Cup 17 years prior—on CTV. This was the first CFL and Grey Cup game broadcast on TSN 4K from BC Place Stadium. In the United States, the game was broadcast on CBS Sports Network. The Grey Cup was broadcast in Punjabi for the first time on a small collections of radio stations throughout Canada: Sher-E-Punjab Radio AM 600 (CKSP) in British Columbia, My Radio AM 580 (CHAM) in Alberta, RadioAwaz.ca (CKYG-FM) in Manitoba, Radio Humsafar-AM 1350 (CIRF) in Ontario, and Radio Humsafar-AM 1610 (CHRN) in Quebec.

== Teams ==
The game featured the Winnipeg Blue Bombers, playing in their fifth consecutive Grey Cup championship and 29th overall appearance, and the Toronto Argonauts in their 25th Grey Cup game. The Blue Bombers had 12 championships, while the Argonauts had a league-leading 18 championships. The game was a rematch of the 2022 Grey Cup.

=== Winnipeg Blue Bombers ===
The Blue Bombers had an uncharacteristically slow start to the year as they opened their season with four straight losses and had a 2–6 record after eight games. By contrast, the Blue Bombers had at least six wins in their first eight games in each of the previous four seasons. Receiver Kenny Lawler was injured in the season opener and sat for out eight games and fellow pass catcher Dalton Schoen was injured in the third regular season game and was on the injured list for the rest of the year, which compounded the team's struggles. However, after the disappointing start, the Blue Bombers won their next eight games and finished with an 11–7 record and captured a fourth consecutive first-place finish in the West Division. Unlike previous seasons where the Blue Bombers were guaranteed a first-place finish early, the team only clinched first place in the West Division after winning their final game of the regular season, defeating the defending Grey Cup champion Montreal Alouettes 28–27 on the strength of a final-play Sergio Castillo 51-yard field goal. In the Blue Bombers' sixth consecutive appearance in the West Final, the team had a commanding victory over the Saskatchewan Roughriders by a score of 38–22. Zach Collaros passed for 301 yards and four touchdowns, including three to Lawler, and Brady Oliveira had 20 rush attempts for 119 yards and a touchdown.

At the end of the regular season, Oliveira was named both the CFL's Most Outstanding Player and CFL's Most Outstanding Canadian, winning the latter for the second consecutive season. He was also named to the All-CFL team for the second time, while Stanley Bryant, Willie Jefferson, and Tyrell Ford were also All-CFL award winners for the eighth, sixth, and first time, respectively. Collaros passed for over 4,000 yards or the third consecutive season and set a career high for completions and passing yards. Despite injuries to former All-Star receivers Lawler and Schoen, Nic Demski and rookie Ontaria Wilson both recorded over 1,000 yards receiving. Bryant made his seventh appearance in a Grey Cup game while Jeffersion and Collaros were playing in their sixth championship games.

=== Toronto Argonauts ===
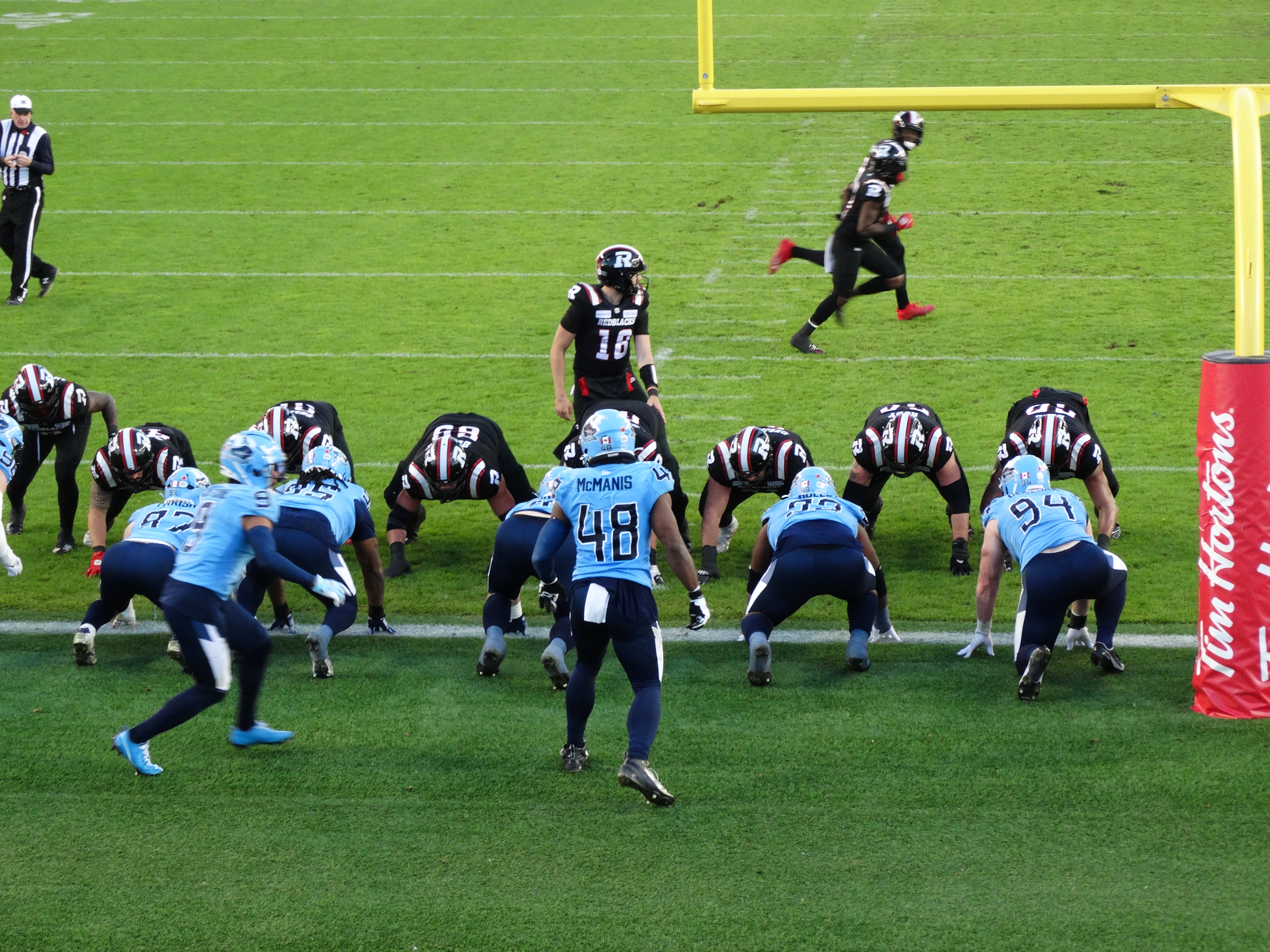
The Argonauts defeated the Redblacks in the East Semi-Final.

The Argonauts began the year without their MOP quarterback, Chad Kelly, who was serving a nine-game suspension after it was determined that he violated the league's gender-based violence policy following an investigation into a lawsuit filed by the team's former strength and conditioning coach. The previous year's backup quarterback, Cameron Dukes started the first eight games to mixed results, as he posted a 4–4 record as a starter. In the team's ninth game, Nick Arbuckle took over as the starter and led the team to a 39–25 victory over the Calgary Stampeders. With the Argonauts sitting at a 5–4 record, Kelly returned as the starter and led the team to five more wins as the Argonauts clinched a second-place finish following their week 20 victory over the Ottawa Redblacks.

In the team's fourth consecutive playoff appearance and home playoff game hosting, the Argonauts defeated the Redblacks in the East Semi-Final in a dominant 58–38 win. In his first playoff start since his disastrous playoff starting debut in 2023, Kelly completed 18 of 20 passes for 358 yards and four touchdowns, for an uncapped passer rating of 218.3, the second highest of any CFL game ever. The Argonauts next played in their fourth straight East Final and third straight against the Montreal Alouettes. The Argonauts forced six turnovers and had an interception return touchdown by Benjie Franklin and a punt return touchdown by Janarion Grant in a 30–28 victory over the Alouettes. However, Kelly left the game with a severe leg injury late in the third quarter and Arbuckle finished the game and sealed the victory. Shortly after the game, Arbuckle was named the team's starter for the Grey Cup.

The Argonauts had two major award winners, with Ryan Hunter winning the CFL's Most Outstanding Offensive Lineman Award and Janarion Grant winning the CFL's Most Outstanding Special Teams Player Award. The team also had four players named to the All-CFL team, including Hunter and Grant as well as Dejon Allen and Jake Ceresna. The Argonauts entered this game having won seven consecutive Grey Cup appearances, with their last loss coming in 1987.

=== Head-to-head ===
The Winnipeg Blue Bombers and Toronto Argonauts played twice during the regular season with Toronto winning both games. In the first game, in Toronto, the Argonauts won 16–14 in overtime as Winnipeg's Sergio Castillo missed a field goal attempt in extra time while Toronto's Lirim Hajrullahu was successful on a 34-yarder to provide the game-winning points. Tarvarus McFadden, who had re-signed with the Argonauts after being cut in training camp, scored the only major for the Argonauts on an interception return touchdown. The second game was also a low-scoring affair with the Argonauts winning 14–11 in Winnipeg, which clinched a playoff spot for the team and also halted the Blue Bombers' eight-game winning streak. The Argos sacked Collaros seven times, led by Folarin Orimolade who had two sacks and a game-sealing interception.

This championship was the eighth meeting between the two teams in the championship game, with the previous seven having been won by Toronto, most recently in 2022. The Argonauts won the first meeting in 1937 and repeated as champions in 1938. Toronto then won three consecutive championships over the Blue Bombers in 1945, 1946, and 1947 before winning the infamous Mud Bowl in 1950. All six of these championship games were played at Varsity Stadium, in Toronto.

=== Uniforms ===
As the West Division representative in a Grey Cup held in a West Division city, the Winnipeg Blue Bombers were the designated home team for the game and have first choice of uniform. The Blue Bombers wore their standard blue jerseys with alternate blue pants while the Argonauts wore white jerseys with white pants and Cambridge blue socks.

== Game summary ==
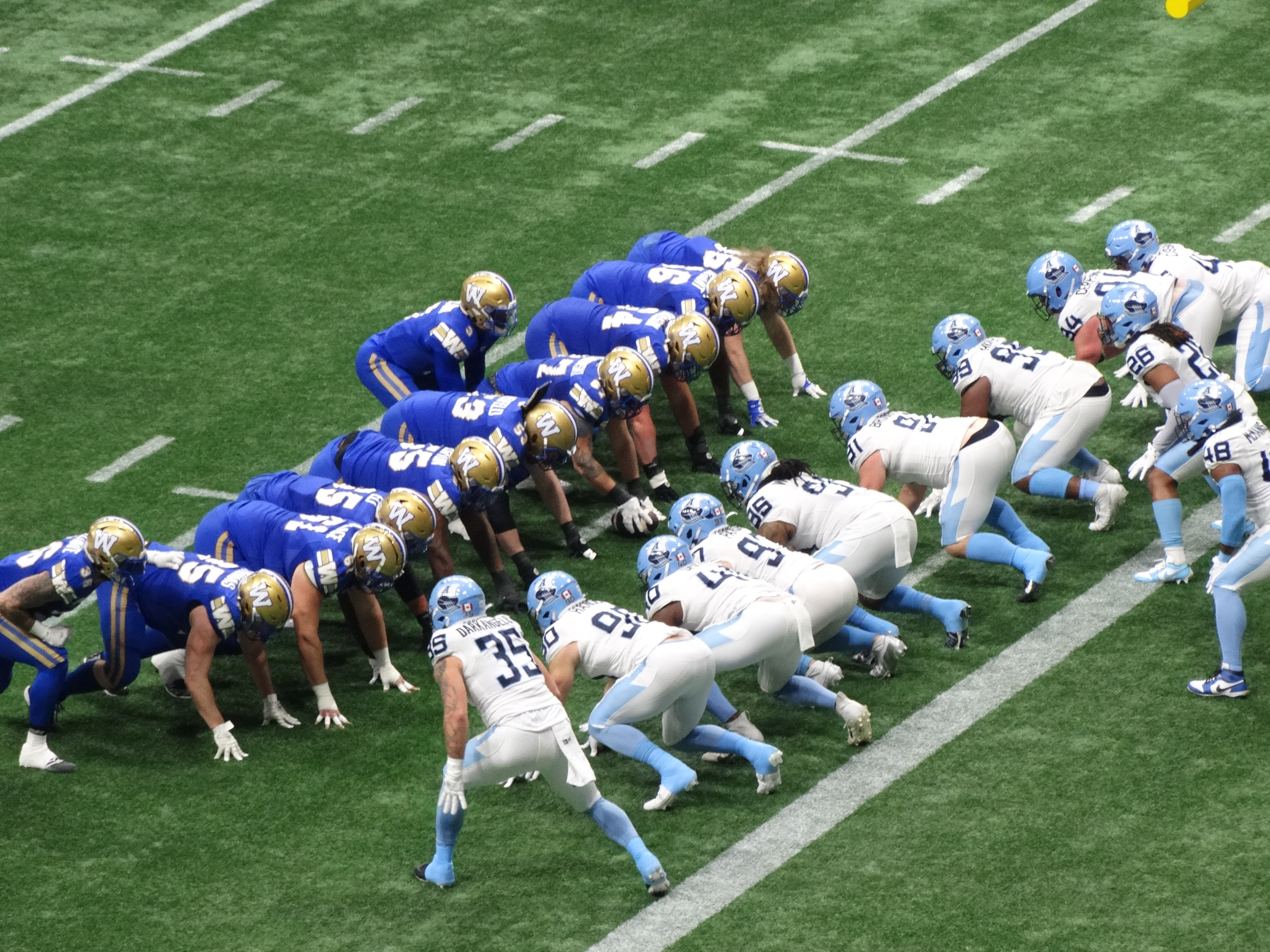
Terry Wilson behind centre with the short yardage unit in the first quarter.

The Winnipeg Blue Bombers won the initial coin toss and chose to receive the ball immediately, but took procedure penalty on their first offensive play and went two-and-out on their first possession. Following a Janarion Grant 23-yard punt return, quarterback Nick Arbuckle led the Argonauts on an 11-play, 51-yard drive down to the Blue Bombers' one-yard line. However, on 3rd-and-one, the Argonauts appeared to intentionally try to draw the Blue Bombers offside and instead took a time count penalty and settled for a Lirim Hajrullahu 13-yard field goal. As the first quarter came to a close, the Bombers replied with a deep pass to Ontaria Wilson that set up a Terry Wilson 3-yard rushing touchdown in the final minute of the quarter, putting them up 7–3.

The offences for both teams stalled to begin the second quarter, but Winnipeg soon put together a long drive that began at their own 26-yard line and progressed down to Toronto's 8-yard line. However, after an incompletion, quarterback Zach Collaros was sacked by Robbie Smith, so the Blue Bombers settled for a Sergio Castillo 20-yard field goal. On the ensuing Argonaut possession, Arbuckle completed a deep pass to Damonte Coxie for 36 yards which eventually led to a 35-yard field goal. Hajrullahu was injured on the play, but was able to walk to the sidelines. On Winnipeg's next possession, Collaros was intercepted by Benjie Franklin, who had his third straight post-season game with an interception, with under two minutes left in the half. The Argonauts then marched 44 yards down to the Blue Bombers' 38-yard line where a resilient Hajrullahu connected on a 45-yard field goal attempt. Winnipeg led 10–9 going into halftime.

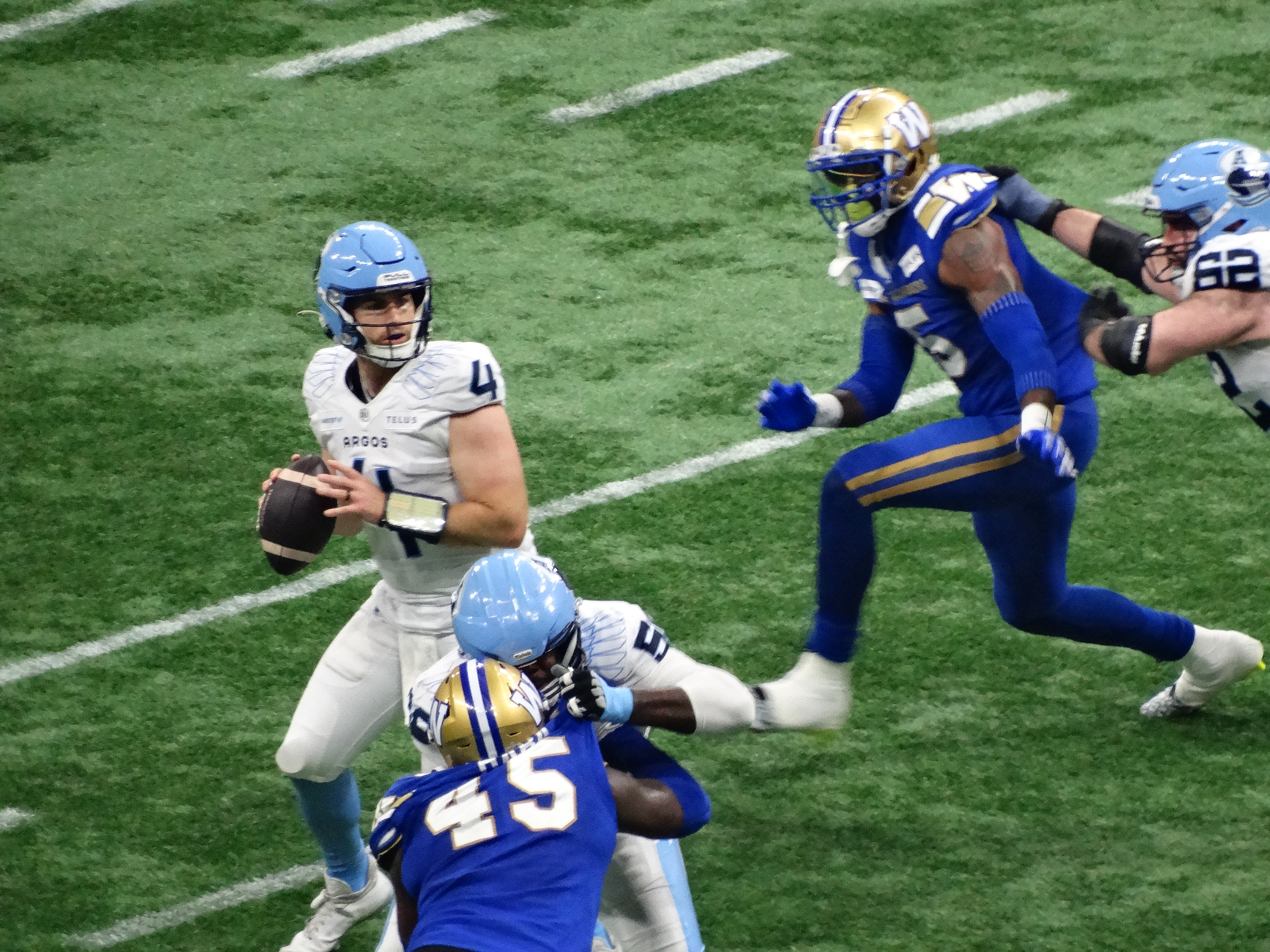
Willie Jefferson (5) pursues Nick Arbuckle (4) as he attempts a pass.

The Argonauts had the first possession of the third quarter, where the Blue Bombers elected to trade score for field position, conceding a single on a 70-yard John Haggerty punt to tie the game at 10–10. After a Winnipeg two-and-out, the Argonauts were again moving the ball, but Arbuckle fumbled while being sacked by Willie Jefferson which was recovered by Toronto's Peter Nicastro. The Argonauts were forced to punt, but punt returner Lucky Whitehead fumbled after contacting Fraser Sopik, which was recovered by Toronto's Jack Cassar. On the next play, Arbuckle completed a pass to rookie Kevin Mital who ran 20 yards for the touchdown, leading to the Argonauts' first lead of the game at 17–10. After another Winnipeg two-and-out, Arbuckle attempted a deep pass for Coxie, but was intercepted by Terrell Bonds at the Winnipeg 40-yard line. Following a 35-yard run by Brady Oliveira, the Blue Bombers were able to kick a 40-yard field goal to narrow the gap to 17–13. However, Collaros was injured on the incomplete deep pass attempt on the play prior, resulting in a laceration to the top knuckle on his right index finger. On the Argonauts' next possession, they moved the ball six yards before having Haggerty's punt blocked by Michael Ayers which was recovered by Winnipeg's Brandon Alexander. However, Kyrie Wilson was flagged for illegal interference on a loose ball behind the line of scrimmage which resulted in an automatic first down for the Argonauts going into the fourth quarter.

Despite the stunning turn of events, Jefferson intercepted a short pass from Arbuckle two plays after the negated blocked punt, giving Winnipeg possession at Toronto's 30-yard line. With Collaros getting his finger stitched in the locker room, backup quarterback Wilson entered the game where he went 0/3 in pass attempts leading to a Winnipeg 23-yard field goal from Castillo, with the score 17–16 in favour of Toronto. Unshaken by the Blue Bombers gaining ground, the Argonauts march down the field on an eight-play, 70-yard drive that culminated in a 17-yard touchdown pass from Arbuckle to Dejon Brissett. Collaros returned to the game with a bandage and a glove on his throwing hand and was immediately intercepted on a deep ball by DaShaun Amos who returned it 45 yards to Winnipeg's 16-yard line. Hajrullahu's 14-yard field goal attempt made it a two-possession game at 27–16. On Winnipeg's next possession, after a few plays and 3:23 remaining on the clock, the team gambled on 3rd-and-three, but Collaros was again intercepted, this time by Robert Priester, who returned the ball 61 yards for a touchdown and a 34–16 Argonaut lead. After getting the ball back, Collaros was intercepted two plays later by Wynton McManis on a tipped pass which was returned 58 yards to Winnipeg's four-yard line. Toronto's Ka'Deem Carey scored a four-yard touchdown on the next play, giving the Argoanuts a 41–16 lead with 2:14 left to play. With the game mostly decided, Winnipeg managed to march the ball down and score a touchdown and two-point convert, both by Oliveira to bring the score to 41–24 with 47 seconds left to play. However, on the ensuing onside kick attempt, Brissett recovered the ball for the Argonauts and Toronto kneeled down in three plays to secure the victory and end the game.

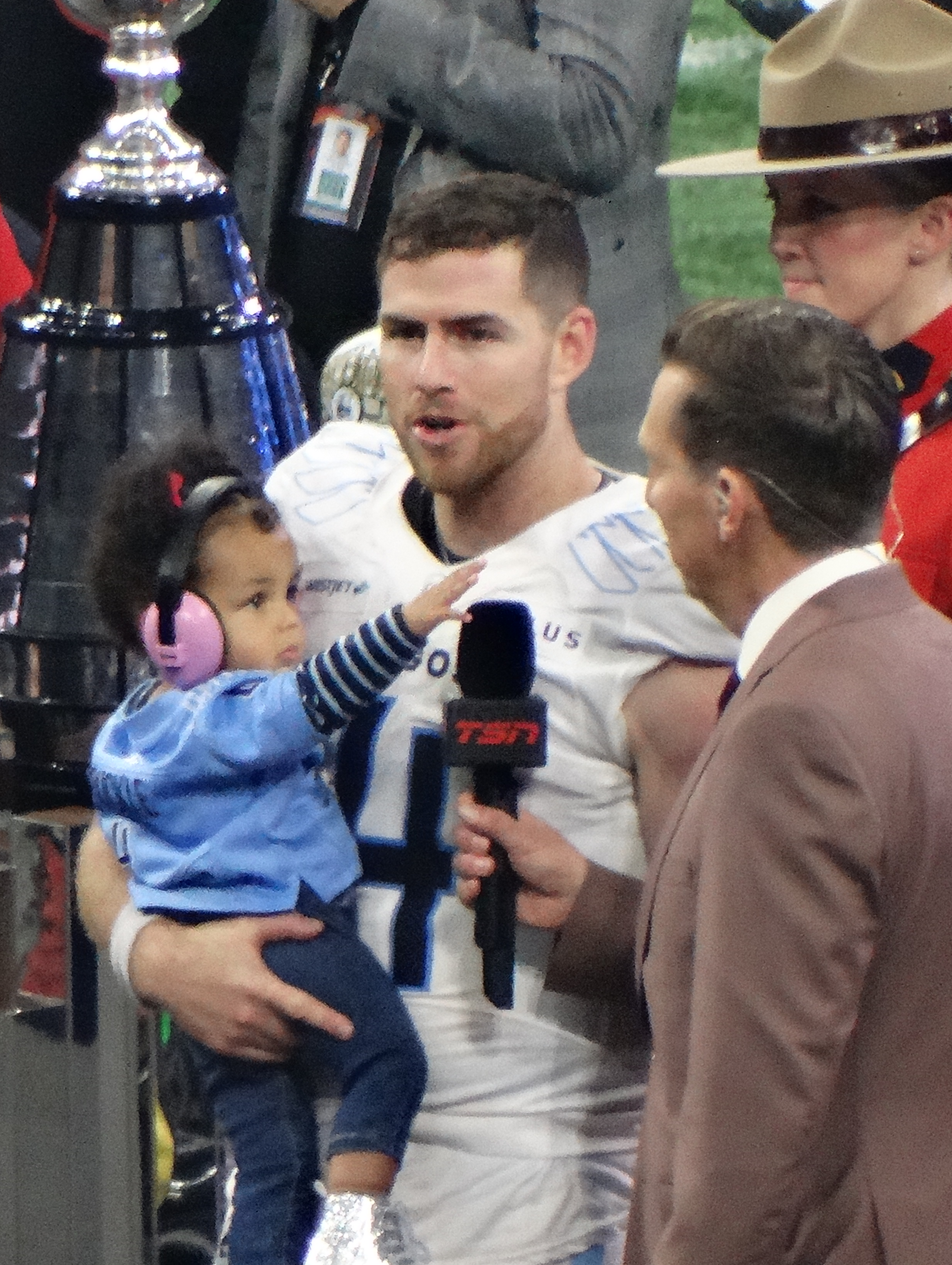
Nick Arbuckle, holding his daughter, and being interviewed by James Duthie, was named the Grey Cup Most Valuable Player.

Arbuckle finished the game having completed 70.3% of his pass attempts for 252 yards to go with two touchdown passes and two interceptions and was named the Grey Cup Most Valuable Player after nearly ending his career and retiring prior to the 2024 season. Brissett led the Argonauts' balanced pass attack in receiving yards with 45 yards and also had a touchdown and kickoff return which earned him the Dick Suderman Trophy for being the Most Valuable Canadian Player of the game.

=== Scoring summary ===
First quarter

TOR – FG Hajrullahu 13 yards (7:56) 3–0 TOR
WPG – TD T. Wilson 3-yard run (Castillo convert) (0:18) 7–3 WPG

Second quarter

WPG – FG Castillo 20 yards (6:12) 10–3 WPG
TOR – FG Hajrullahu 35 yards (2:10) 10–6 WPG
TOR – FG Hajrullahu 45 yards (0:16) 10–9 WPG

Third quarter

TOR – Single Haggerty punt 70 yards (12:20) 10–10
TOR – TD Mital 17-yard reception from Arbuckle (Hajrullahu convert) (6:13) 17–10 TOR
WPG – FG Castillo 40 yards (2:13) 17–13 TOR

Fourth quarter

WPG – FG Castillo 23 yards (12:34) 17–16 TOR
TOR – TD Brissett 17-yard reception from Arbuckle (Hajrullahu convert) (7:31) 24–16 TOR
TOR – FG Hajrullahu 14 yards (5:11) 27–16 TOR
TOR – TD Priester 61-yard interception return (Hajrullahu convert) (3:12) 34–16 TOR
TOR – TD Carey 4-yard run (Hajrullahu convert) (2:14) 41–16 TOR
WPG – TD Oliveira 1-yard run (Oliveira run, two-point convert) (0:47) 41–24 TOR

=== Individual statistics ===
Sources: CFL 111th Grey Cup Boxscore

Blue Bombers passing
Player	CP/AT	Pct	Yards	TD	Int
(United States) Zach Collaros	15/30	50.0%	202	0	4
(United States) Terry Wilson	0/3	0.0%	0	0	0
Blue Bombers rushing
Player	Car	Yards	Avg	Lg	TD
(Canada) Brady Oliveira	11	84	7.6	35	1
(United States) Terry Wilson	1	3	3.0	3	1
Blue Bombers receiving
Player	Rec	Yards	Avg	Lg	TD
(United States) Ontaria Wilson	5	99	19.8	49	0
(United States) Kenny Lawler	2	27	13.5	22	0
(Canada) Kevens Clercius	3	24	8.0	10	0
(Canada) Nic Demski	2	18	9.0	9	0
(Canada) Brady Oliveira	2	18	9.0	10	0
(United States) Keric Wheatfall	1	16	16.0	16	0
Blue Bombers defence
Player	DT–ST	QS	Int	FR	FF
(United States) Willie Jefferson	6–0	2	1	0	1
(Canada) Tyrell Ford	6–0	0	0	0	0
(United States) Nick Taylor	5–0	0	0	0	0
(United States) Tony Jones	4–0	0	0	0	0
(United States) Michael Griffin II	4–0	0	0	0	0
(United States) Evan Holm	3–0	0	0	0	0
(United States) Deatrick Nichols	3–0	0	0	0	0
(United States) Brandon Alexander	3–1	0	0	0	0
(United States) TyJuan Garbutt	3–0	0	0	0	0
(United States) Kyrie Wilson	2–0	0	0	0	0
(Canada) Redha Kramdi	2–0	0	0	0	0
(Canada) Liam Dobson	1–0	0	0	0	0
(United States) Miles Fox	1–0	0	0	0	0
(United States) Keric Wheatfall	1–0	0	0	0	0
(United States) Celestin Haba	1–0	0	0	0	0
(United States) Ontaria Wilson	1–0	0	0	0	0
(Canada) Bailey Feltmate	0–1	0	0	0	0
(Canada) Nick Hallett	0–1	0	0	0	0
(Canada) Kevens Clercius	0–1	0	0	0	0
(United States) Michael Ayers	0–1	0	0	0	0
(Canada) Shayne Gauthier	0–1	0	0	0	0
(United States) Terrell Bonds	0–0	0	1	0	0
Blue Bombers placekicking
Player	FM–FA	Lng	Avg	Sng	CM-CA
(United States) Sergio Castillo	3–3	40	27.7	0	1–1
Blue Bombers punting
Player	No	GAv	NAv	Sng	Lng
(Australia) Jamieson Sheahan	5	45.8	—	0	50
Blue Bombers punt returns
Player	PR	Yards	Avg	Lg	TD
(United States) Lucky Whitehead	4	48	12.0	17	0
Blue Bombers kickoff returns
Player	PR	Yards	Avg	Lg	TD
(United States) Lucky Whitehead	5	101	20.2	29	0

Argonauts passing
Player	CP/AT	Pct	Yards	TD	Int
(United States) Nick Arbuckle	26/37	70.3%	252	2	2
Argonauts rushing
Player	Car	Yards	Avg	Lg	TD
(United States) Ka'Deem Carey	15	79	5.3	18	1
(United States) Nick Arbuckle	2	11	5.5	7	0
(Canada) Daniel Adeboboye	1	2	2.0	2	0
Argonauts receiving
Player	Rec	Yards	Avg	Lg	TD
(Canada) Dejon Brissett	3	45	15.0	17	1
(United States) Makai Polk	4	42	10.5	15	0
(United States) Deonta McMahon	2	41	20.5	29	0
(United States) DaVaris Daniels	3	37	12.3	14	0
(Canada) David Ungerer	4	29	7.3	15	0
(United States) Damonte Coxie	3	29	9.7	36	0
(Canada) Kevin Mital	2	23	11.5	17	1
(United States) Ka'Deem Carey	3	10	3.3	7	0
(United States) Janarion Grant	2	−4	−2.0	5	0
Argonauts defence
Player	DT–ST	QS	Int	FR	FF
(United States) Wynton McManis	6–0	0	1	0	0
(Canada) Royce Metchie	3–0	0	0	0	0
(United States) Benjie Franklin	3–0	0	1	0	0
(Canada) Robbie Smith	2–0	1	0	0	0
(United States) Jared Brinkman	2–0	0	0	0	0
(United States) DaShaun Amos	2–0	0	1	0	0
(Canada) Tunde Adeleke	2–0	0	0	0	0
(Canada) Tyshon Blackburn	1–1	0	0	0	0
(United States) Tarvarus McFadden	1–0	0	0	0	0
(United States) Jordan Williams	1–0	0	0	0	0
(United States) Jake Ceresna	1–0	0	0	0	0
(United States) Mark Milton	1–0	0	0	0	0
(United States) Ka'Deem Carey	1–0	0	0	0	0
(Germany) Thiadric Hansen	0–3	0	0	0	0
(United States) Isaac Darkangelo	0–2	0	0	0	0
(Canada) Fraser Sopik	0–1	0	0	0	1
(United States) Robert Priester	0–0	0	1	0	0
(Canada) Jack Cassar	0–0	0	0	1	0
Argonauts placekicking
Player	FM–FA	Lng	Avg	Sng	CM-CA
(Canada) Lirim Hajrullahu	4–4	45	26.8	0	4–4
Argonauts punting
Player	No	GAv	NAv	Sng	Lng
(Australia) John Haggerty	5	54.8	—	1	70
Argonauts punt returns
Player	PR	Yards	Avg	Lg	TD
(United States) Janarion Grant	4	33	8.3	23	0
Argonauts kickoff returns
Player	PR	Yards	Avg	Lg	TD
(United States) Janarion Grant	1	25	25.0	25	0
(Canada) Dejon Brissett	1	0	0.0	0	0

== Depth charts ==
The following diagrams illustrate the teams' depth charts that were released one day prior to game day. Starters are listed in boxes in their respective positions with backups listed directly above or below. As per CFL rules, 45 players for each team dress in the game.

=== Winnipeg Blue Bombers ===
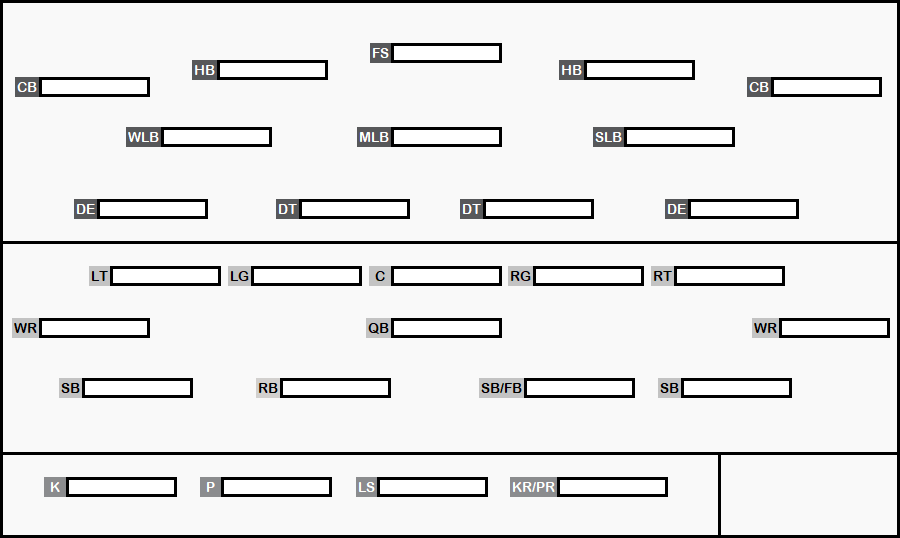

=== Toronto Argonauts ===
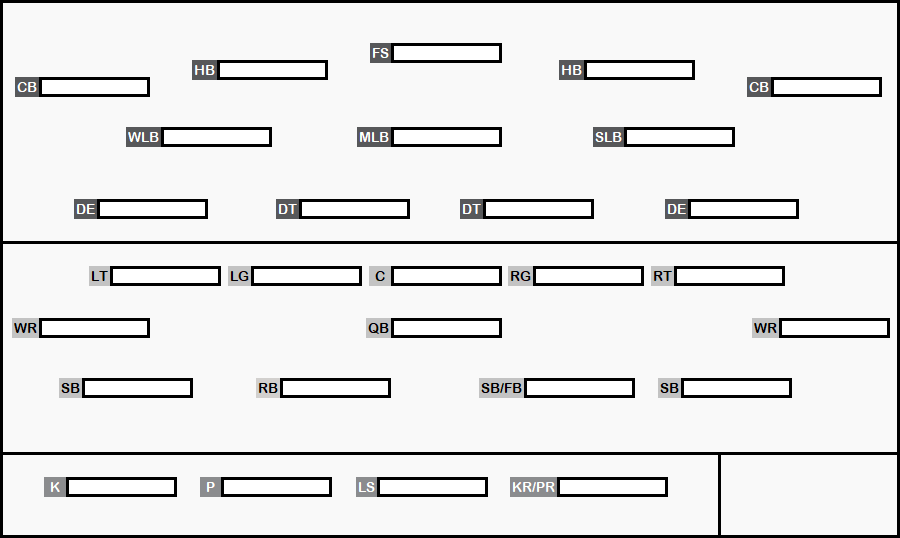

== Officials ==
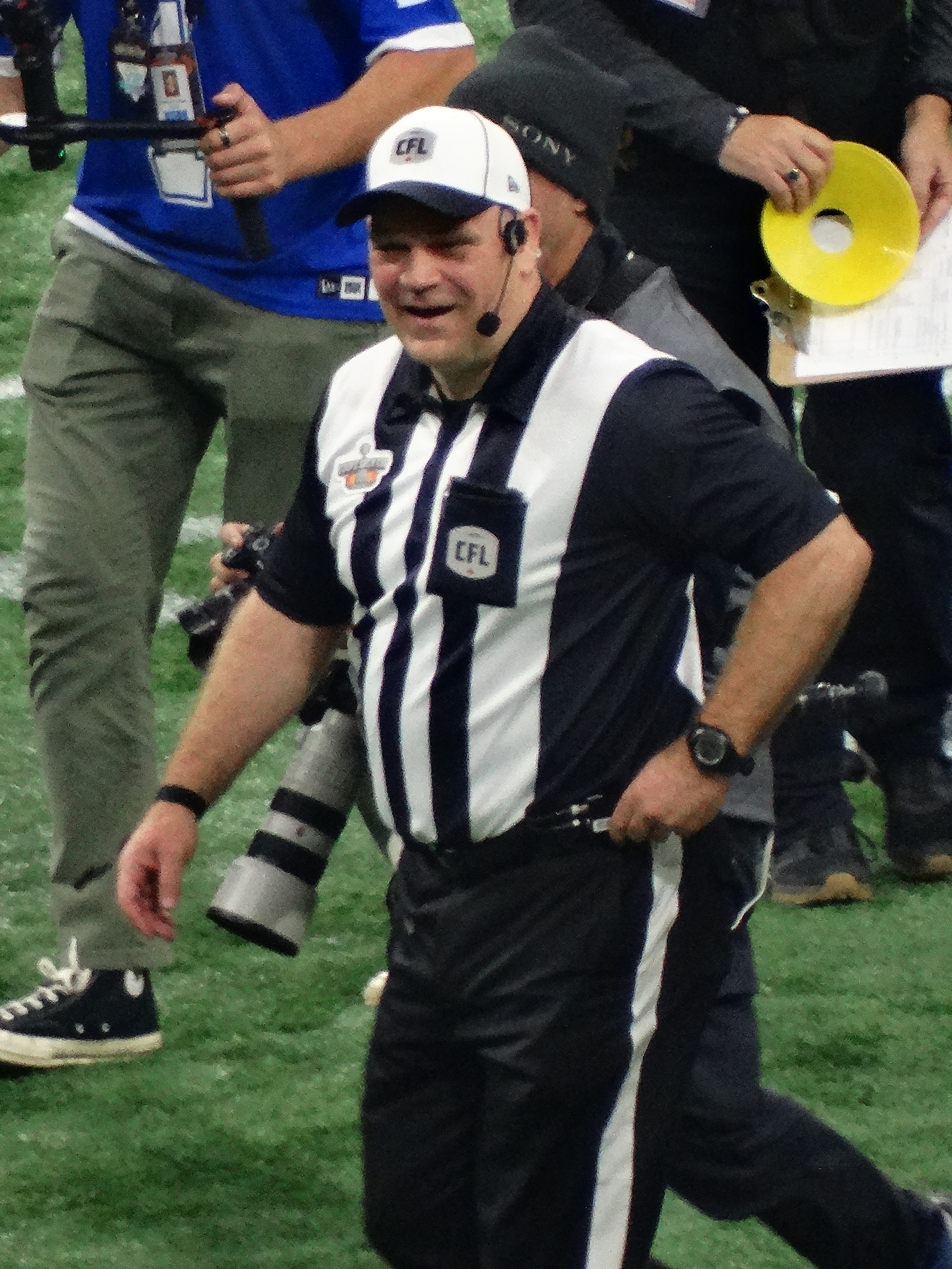
Ben Major officiated his eighth Grey Cup.

The highest-rated officials during the 2024 CFL season from their respective positions were selected for the game and announced on November 14, 2024. The numbers below indicate their uniform numbers.

- Referee: No. 31 Ben Major
- Umpire: No. 45 Adam Paradowski
- Down Judge: No. 19 Chris Shapka
- Line Judge: No. 81 Walt Hawrysh
- Side Judge: No. 65 Iain Cropper
- Back Judge: No. 40 Kevin Riopel
- Field Judge: No. 73 Brian Chrupalo
- Backup Referee: No. 28 Andre Proulx
- Backup Official: No. 49 Jordan Titosky
- Backup Official: No. 46 Rob Skaggs
