= Dejon Brissett =

Canadian gridiron football player (born 1996)

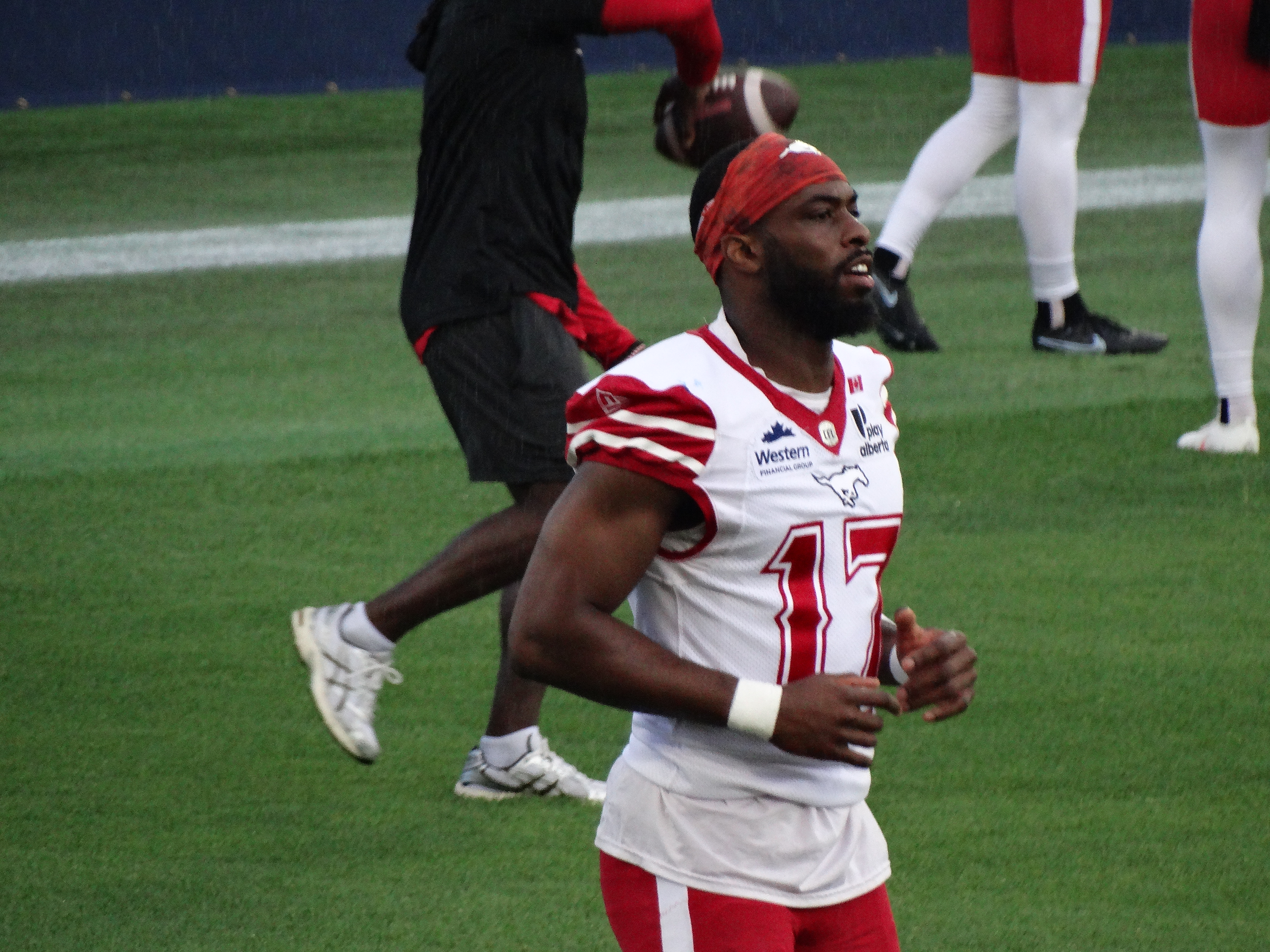
- Brissett with the Calgary Stampeders in 2026

No. 17 – Calgary Stampeders
- Position: Wide receiver
- Roster status: Active
- CFL status: National

Personal information
- Born: July 9, 1996 (age 30); Mississauga, Ontario, Canada
- Listed height: 6 ft 1 in (1.85 m)
- Listed weight: 206 lb (93 kg)

Career information
- High school: Loyola Catholic Secondary School (Mississauga, Ontario); Lake Forest Academy (Lake Forest, Illinois, U.S.); Hazel McCallion Senior Public School (Mississauga, Ontario)
- College: Richmond (2015–2018); Virginia (2019)
- CFL draft: 2020: 1st round, 2nd overall pick

Career history
- 2021–2025: Toronto Argonauts
- 2026–present: Calgary Stampeders

Awards and highlights
- 2× Grey Cup champion (2022, 2024); Grey Cup Most Valuable Canadian (2024)

Career CFL statistics as of 2026
- Games played: 84
- Receptions: 165
- Receiving yards: 2,437
- Receiving touchdowns: 17
- Rushing yards: 25
- Rushing touchdowns: 0
- Stats at CFL.ca

Dejon Brissett (born July 9, 1996) is a Canadian professional football wide receiver for the Calgary Stampeders of the Canadian Football League (CFL). He is a two-time Grey Cup champion after winning with the Toronto Argonauts in 2022 and 2024. He played college football for the Richmond Spiders and the Virginia Cavaliers.

== Early life ==
Brissett is a native of Mississauga, Ontario, and primarily played basketball growing up before turning his attention to football. He transferred to Lake Forest Academy in Illinois for his sophomore year, where he played basketball, football, and track. His 46-3 triple jump was the best in 2015 by more than a foot. On the football field, he played wide receiver, defense, and special teams. Brissett ran a 4.59 40-yard dash, has a vertical leap of 35 inches, and was named the Chicago Catholic League Red Division's Offensive Player of the Year.

== College career ==
Brissett began his collegiate career at Richmond. He made five catches for 66 yards as a sophomore in 2016. In the second game of his junior season, Brissett made 12 receptions for 159 yards in a 20–17 win at Colgate. As a junior in 2017, he made 63 receptions for 896 yards and seven touchdowns, averaging 81.5 receiving yards per game. Brissett was named to the First Team All-Colonial Athletic Association. In 2018, he made 16 receptions for 299 yards and a touchdown, averaging 99.7 yards per game. His season was cut short after three games after an ankle injury that he suffered on September 13 against Saint Francis (PA). During his Richmond career, Brissett recorded 86 receptions for 1,282 yards and nine touchdowns and returned 41 kicks for 941 yards and one touchdown. Brissett applied for a medical hardship waiver from the NCAA, and after receiving it decided to transfer to Virginia for his final season of eligibility, despite initially saying he was going to play at Illinois. He was sparingly used by the Cavaliers, playing in 12 of 14 games and contributing two receptions for 18 yards in the season.

== Professional career ==
=== Toronto Argonauts ===
Brissett was drafted second overall in the 2020 CFL draft by the Toronto Argonauts, who finished with a 4–14 record in 2019. He was the fourth Cavalier drafted in the CFL Draft since 2012 and first since Trent Corney was taken in 2016 by the Winnipeg Blue Bombers. Brissett did not play in 2020 due to the cancellation of the 2020 CFL season and officially signed with the Argonauts on May 5, 2021. Following training camp, he made the team's active roster and played in his first professional game on August 7, 2021, against the Calgary Stampeders. He later scored his first career touchdown on October 6, 2021, against the Ottawa Redblacks when he returned a blocked punt 23 yards for the major. Brissett played in all 14 regular season games in 2021, making five starts, where he had nine catches for 131 yards, three defensive tackles, one special teams tackle, and one fumble recovery touchdown. He also made his post-season debut in the team's East Final loss to the Hamilton Tiger-Cats, but did not record any statistics.

In 2022, Brissett played in 15 regular season games, starting in one, where he had ten catches for 102 yards and one touchdown. He also featured more prominently on special teams where he had six special teams tackles, three kick returns for 44 yards, and four punt returns for 28 yards. He played in both post-season games, including the 109th Grey Cup where he had one special teams tackle in the team's victory over the Winnipeg Blue Bombers.

In the 2023 season, Brissett gained a larger role on offense as he played in all 18 regular season games, starting in 13, where he had a career-high 38 receptions for 594 yards and five touchdowns. He also had 11 special teams tackles, one forced fumble, and five kickoff returns for 109 yards. He had the first playoff catches of his career where he had four receptions for 34 yards in the East Final loss to the Montreal Alouettes. On February 5, 2024, the Argonauts announced that Brissett had signed a contract extension with the team.

Brissett missed the majority of the 2024 season with a knee injury. He caught five passes for 72 yards and a touchdown through Toronto's first two games, and then was placed on the injured list. He returned to play in each of Toronto's final four regular season games, finishing the season with 14 receptions for 171 yards and three touchdowns. In the 111th Grey Cup, Brissett caught three passes for 45 yards and a touchdown, and recovered an onside kick attempt in the team's victory over the Winnipeg Blue Bombers. For his performance, he was named the game's Most Valuable Canadian.

In 2025, Brissett had a career-high 65 receptions for 907 yards and three touchdowns in 18 regular season games. He became a free agent upon the expiry of his contract on February 10, 2026.

=== Calgary Stampeders ===
On February 10, 2026, it was announced that Brissett had signed a two-year contract with the Calgary Stampeders.

== Personal life ==
Brissett is the son of McKeitha McFarlane and Bernard Brissett, who separated when he was young. He is of Jamaican descent. Brissett is the older brother of Oshae Brissett, who played college basketball at Syracuse and won a championship with the Boston Celtics, as well as a championship with Maccabi Tel Aviv.
