= Wynton McManis =

American gridiron football player (born 1994)

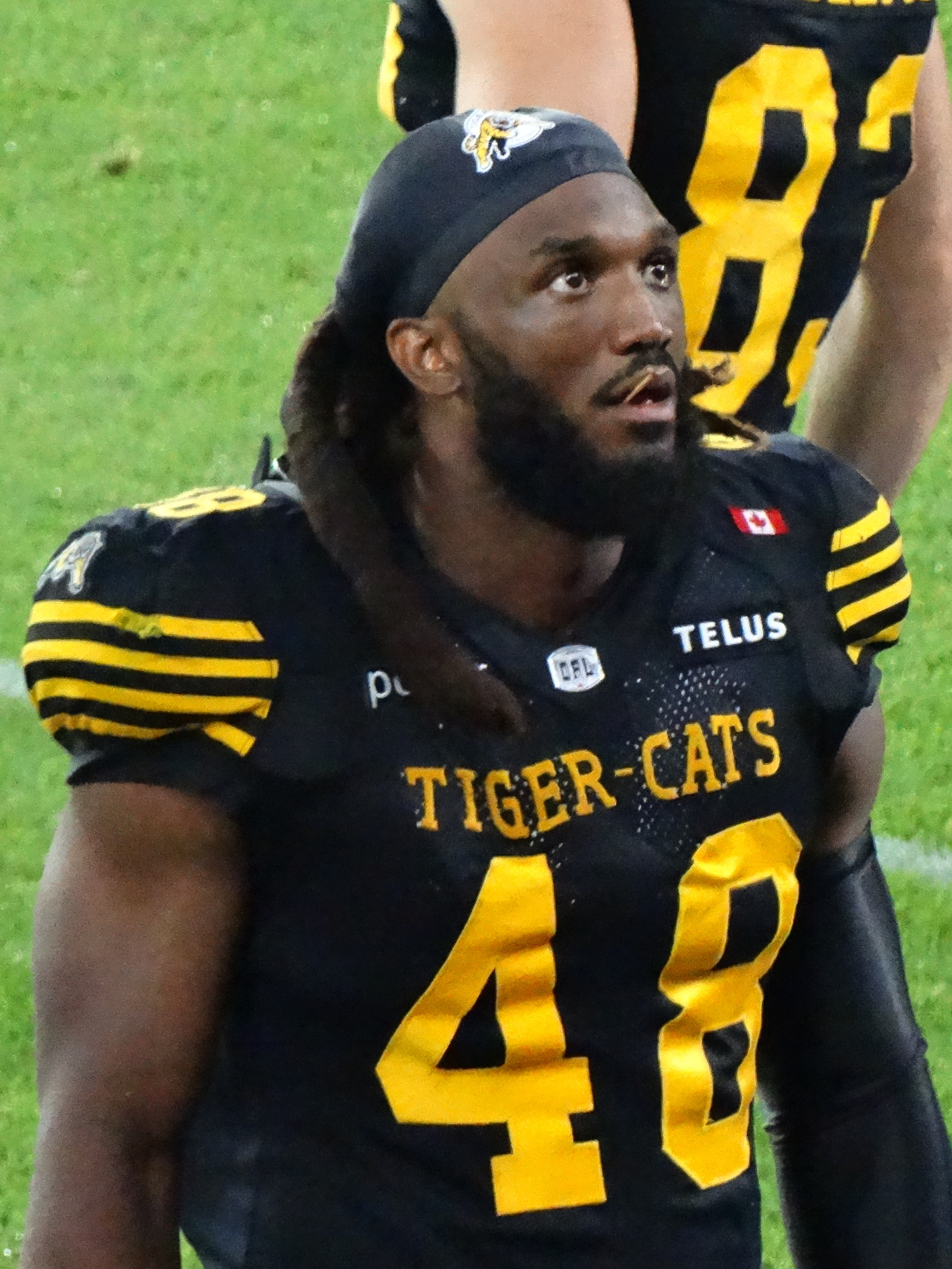
- McManis with the Hamilton Tiger-Cats in 2026

No. 48 – Hamilton Tiger-Cats
- Position: Linebacker
- Roster status: Active
- CFL status: American

Personal information
- Born: September 20, 1994 (age 32); Memphis, Tennessee, U.S.
- Listed height: 6 ft 0 in (1.83 m)
- Listed weight: 220 lb (100 kg)

Career information
- High school: Olive Branch (Olive Branch, Mississippi)
- College: Memphis
- NFL draft: 2016: undrafted

Career history
- San Francisco 49ers (2016); Calgary Stampeders (2017–2019); New Orleans Saints (2020–2021); Miami Dolphins (2021)*; Toronto Argonauts (2022–2025); Hamilton Tiger-Cats (2026–present)
- * Offseason or practice squad member only

Awards and highlights
- 3× Grey Cup champion (2018, 2022, 2024); 2× CFL All-Star (2022, 2023); 2× CFL East All-Star (2022, 2023)

Career NFL statistics
- Games played: 3
- Stats at Pro Football Reference

Career CFL statistics as of 2026
- Games played: 115
- Defensive tackles: 460
- Special teams tackles: 52
- Sacks: 16
- Interceptions: 11
- Forced fumbles: 4
- Fumble recoveries: 3
- Stats at CFL.ca

Wynton McManis (born September 20, 1994) is an American professional football linebacker for the Hamilton Tiger-Cats of the Canadian Football League (CFL). He is a two-time CFL All-Star and a three-time Grey Cup champion after winning with the Calgary Stampeders in 2018 and with the Argonauts in 2022 and 2024.

== College career ==
McManis played college football for the Memphis Tigers from 2012 to 2015. He played in 47 games where he had 111 total tackles, 9.5 tackles for a loss, 2.5 sacks, two forced fumbles, one fumble recovery, and two pass breakups. He was a team captain in his senior year with the Tigers.

== Professional career ==
Pre-draft measurables
Height	Weight	Arm length	Hand span	Wingspan	40-yard dash	10-yard split	20-yard split	20-yard shuttle	Three-cone drill	Vertical jump	Broad jump	Bench press
6 ft 0 1/2 in (1.84 m)	237 lb (108 kg)	30 7/8 in (0.78 m)	9 5/8 in (0.24 m)	6 ft 3 7/8 in (1.93 m)	4.68 s	1.68 s	2.72 s	4.39 s	7.14 s	34.5 in (0.88 m)	10 ft 3 in (3.12 m)	21 reps
All values from Pro Day

=== San Francisco 49ers ===
On May 12, 2016, the San Francisco 49ers signed McManis as an undrafted free agent following the 2016 NFL draft. He was released on August 27, and was re-signed to the team's practice squad on November 29. On December 23, the 49ers promoted McManis to their active roster from their practice squad after placing Torrey Smith on injured reserve. He made his professional debut the following day in a 22–21 victory over the Los Angeles Rams, appearing in one snap on defense and two snaps on special teams. McManis also played in the team's January 1, 2017 game against the Seattle Seahawks, playing 16 snaps on special teams. On May 2, McManis was waived by the 49ers.

=== Calgary Stampeders ===
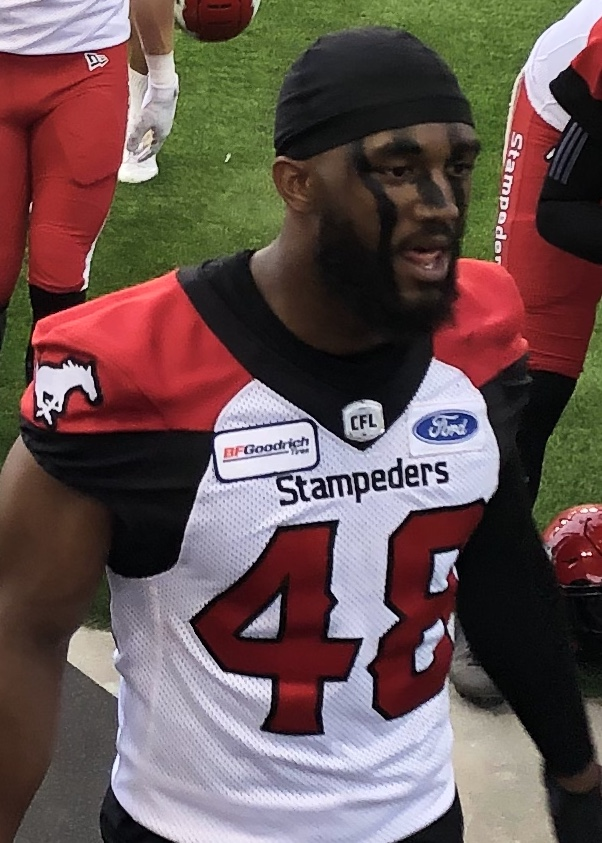
McManis with the Calgary Stampeders in 2019

McManis signed with the Calgary Stampeders on June 17, 2017, at the conclusion of the team's training camp. He made his CFL debut in Week 3 on July 8, against the Winnipeg Blue Bombers, where he had two defensive tackles and two sacks. He played in 12 regular season games where he had two defensive tackles, seven special teams tackles, and two sacks in 2017.

In 2018, McManis played in 16 regular season games, starting in one, where he had 16 defensive tackles, 25 special teams tackles, one forced fumble, and one fumble recovery. He also made his post-season debut, playing in two games, including the 106th Grey Cup, where he had two special teams tackles and one fumble recovery in the Stampeders' 27–16 victory over the Ottawa Redblacks. In the 2019 season, McManis became a regular starter where he played and started in 15 regular season games, recording 86 defensive tackles, nine special teams tackles, four pass knockdowns, two sacks, one forced fumble, and one fumble recovery. He also had eight defensive tackles in the team's West Semi-Final loss to the Blue Bombers.

After the CFL canceled the 2020 season due to the COVID-19 pandemic, McManis chose to opt-out of his contract with the Stampeders.

=== New Orleans Saints ===
McManis was signed by the New Orleans Saints on August 29, 2020. He was waived by New Orleans on September 5. On January 20, 2021, McManis signed a reserve/futures contract with the Saints. He was waived by the team on August 31, and was subsequently re-signed to the team's practice squad. McManis was released by New Orleans on September 6. McManis was re-signed to the Saints' practice squad on September 15, and was elevated to the 53-man roster on September 18. The next day, he appeared in eight snaps on special teams against the Carolina Panthers. He was released on September 20, and re-signed to the practice squad. McManis was released once again on October 12.

=== Miami Dolphins ===
On November 24, 2021, McManis was signed to the Miami Dolphins' practice squad. He did not appear in a regular season game and finished the season on the practice squad.

=== Toronto Argonauts ===
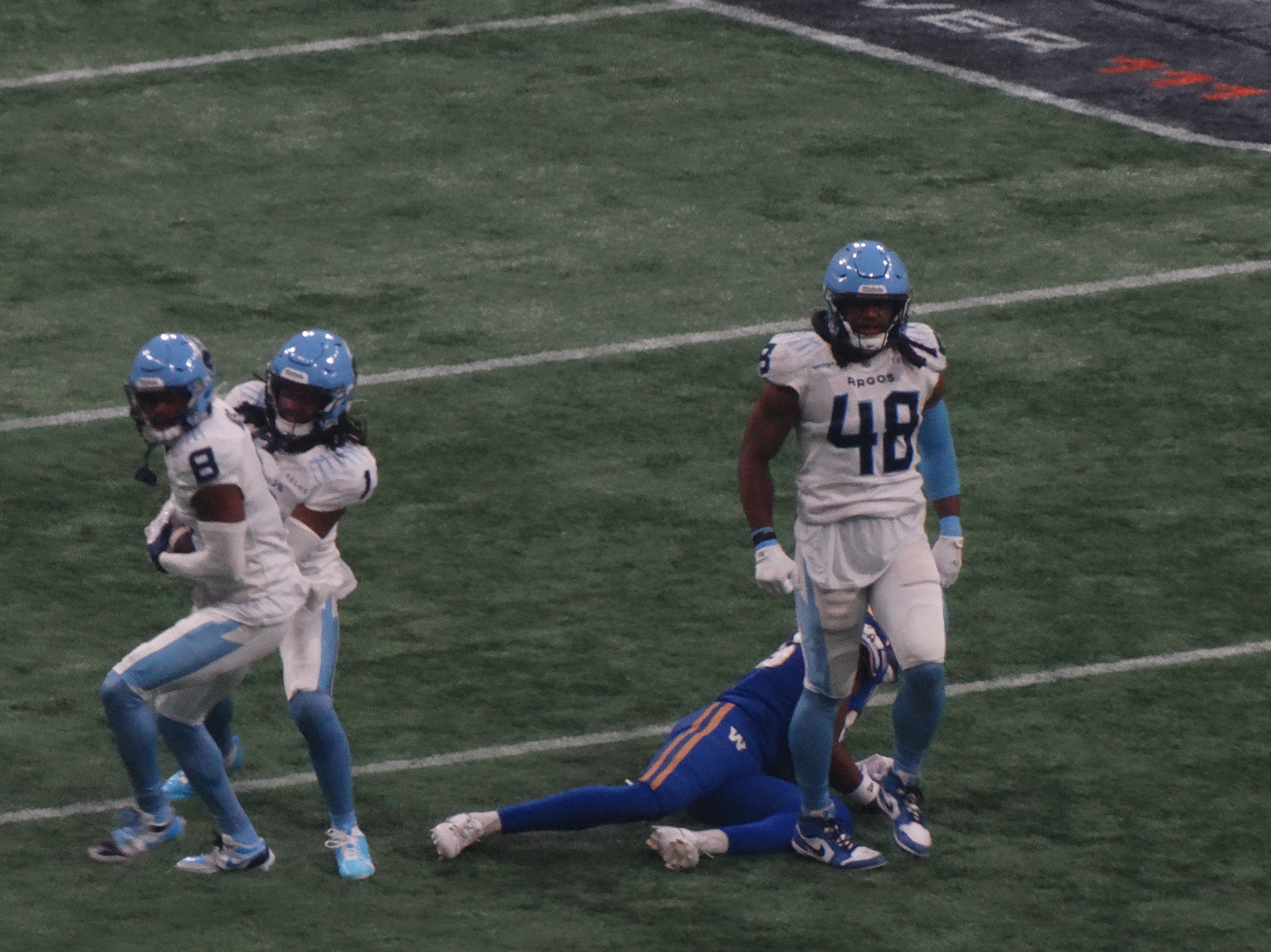
McManis (48) in the 111th Grey Cup game.

On February 8, 2022, it was announced that McManis had signed with the Toronto Argonauts. In 2022, he played and started in 14 regular season games where he had a career-high 88 defensive tackles, seven special teams tackles, three sacks, two interceptions, including one returned for a touchdown, and one forced fumble. In the East Final against the Montreal Alouettes, McManis recorded one defensive tackle but suffered an arm injury during the game. He was on the injured list for the team's 24–23 victory over the Blue Bombers in the 109th Grey Cup, but he won his second Grey Cup championship.

In 2023, McManis played in 16 regular season games, starting in 15, as the Argonauts clinched first place in the East Division after 12 games and McManis rested at different points in the year. He recorded 79 defensive tackles, one special teams tackle, three pass knockdowns, four sacks, four interceptions, including two returned for touchdowns, and one fumble recovery. In the East Final, he had five defensive tackles, but the Argonauts were upset by the Alouettes.

On January 26, 2024, it was announced that McManis had signed a contract extension with the Argonauts. In the 2024 season, McManis played in 12 regular season games, starting in 11, as he sat out six games due to injury and was a backup in the meaningless final regular season game. He recorded 57 defensive tackles, three special teams tackles, one sack, one interception returned for a touchdown, three pass knockdowns, and two fumble recoveries. McManis started in all three post-season games, including the 111th Grey Cup where he had six defensive tackles and one interception in the Argonauts' 41–24 victory over the Winnipeg Blue Bombers.

In 2025, McManis was limited by injuries, but played in 13 regular season games where he had 62 defensive tackles, four sacks, two interceptions, and one forced fumble. As a pending free agent, he was granted an early release on February 3, 2026.

=== Hamilton Tiger-Cats ===
On February 4, 2026, it was announced that McManis had signed with the Hamilton Tiger-Cats.

== Personal life ==
McManis was born to parents Kim and Wenda McManis.
