= DaShaun Amos =

American gridiron football player (born 1994)

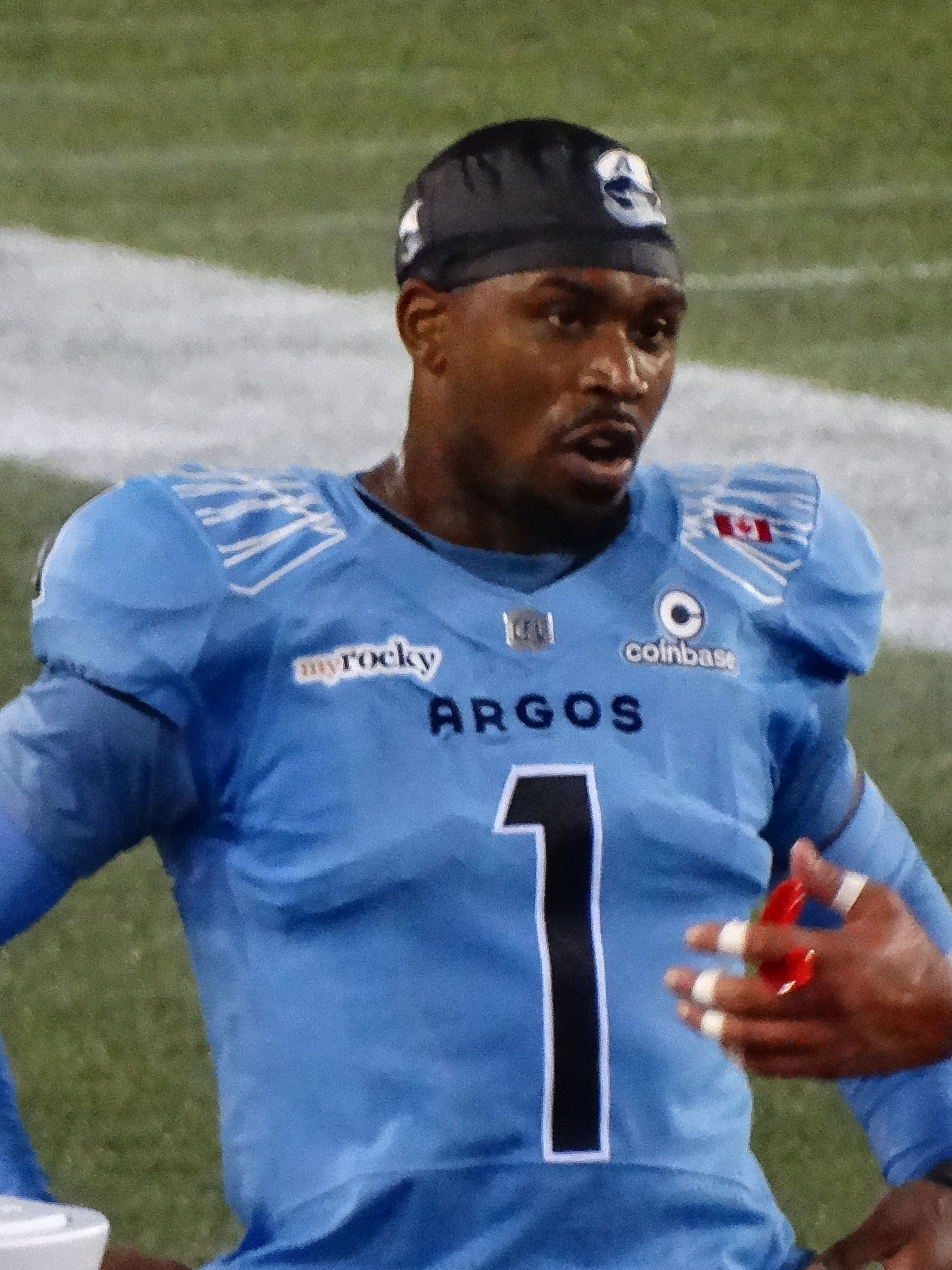
- Amos with the Toronto Argonauts in 2026

No. 1 – Toronto Argonauts
- Position: Defensive back
- Roster status: Active
- CFL status: American

Personal information
- Born: September 20, 1994 (age 32); Midlothian, Virginia, U.S.
- Listed height: 6 ft 0 in (1.83 m)
- Listed weight: 185 lb (84 kg)

Career information
- High school: Manchester High
- College: East Carolina (2012–2016)
- NFL draft: 2017: undrafted

Career history
- New York Giants (2017)*; Calgary Stampeders (2018–2019); Green Bay Packers (2020)*; Calgary Stampeders (2021); Toronto Argonauts (2022–2024); Hamilton Tiger-Cats (2025); Toronto Argonauts (2026–present)
- * Offseason or practice squad member only

Awards and highlights
- 3× Grey Cup champion (2018, 2022, 2024); CFL West All-Star (2019); 2× CFL East All-Star (2024, 2025)
- Stats at Pro Football Reference
- Stats at CFL.ca

DaShaun Amos (born September 20, 1994) is an American professional football defensive back for the Toronto Argonauts of the Canadian Football League (CFL). He is a three-time CFL Divisional All-Star and a three-time Grey Cup champion, having won the championship with the Calgary Stampeders in 2018 and with the Argonauts in 2022 and 2024.

== College career ==
After using a redshirt season in 2012, Amos played college football for the East Carolina Pirates. He appeared in 49 games, recording 116 tackles and 11 passes defenses.

== Professional career ==
Pre-draft measurables
Height	Weight	Arm length	Hand span	Wingspan	40-yard dash	10-yard split	20-yard split	20-yard shuttle	Three-cone drill	Vertical jump	Broad jump	Bench press
5 ft 11 5/8 in (1.82 m)	185 lb (84 kg)	30 1/4 in (0.77 m)	8 in (0.20 m)	6 ft 1 1/8 in (1.86 m)	4.50 s	1.52 s	2.59 s	4.09 s	7.03 s	32.0 in (0.81 m)	9 ft 8 in (2.95 m)	16 reps
All values from Pro Day

=== New York Giants ===
Amos signed as an undrafted free agent with the New York Giants of the National Football League (NFL) on May 12, 2017. He played in all four pre-season games for the Giants but was released during the final roster cuts on September 2, 2017.

=== Calgary Stampeders (first stint) ===
On October 3, 2018, Amos signed with the Calgary Stampeders of the CFL under a practice roster agreement. He played in his first professional regular season game on October 13, 2018, against the BC Lions, playing in place of the injured Brandon Smith. He played in one other regular season game before returning to the practice roster for the remainder of the season, which the Stampeders won the 106th Grey Cup championship.

Amos was re-signed by the Stampeders during the off-season on December 10, 2018, and made the team's active roster following the team's 2019 training camp. He played and started in 17 regular season games, recording 42 defensive tackles and five interceptions. He scored his first professional career touchdown by returning a Logan Kilgore interception for a 79 yards score on September 7, 2019, against the Edmonton Eskimos. He was named a West Division All-Star in his first full CFL season.

=== Green Bay Packers ===
On January 15, 2020, Amos signed a reserve/future contract with the Green Bay Packers of the NFL. However, he was waived on September 5, 2020. Later, Amos was selected by the Aviators during The Spring League's player selection draft on October 12, 2020.

=== Calgary Stampeders (second stint) ===
On February 1, 2021, it was announced that Amos re-signed with the Stampeders for a one-year contract. He played in 13 regular season games where he had 27 defensive tackles, five special teams tackles, and one forced fumble.

=== Toronto Argonauts (first stint) ===
On February 8, 2022, it was announced that Amos had signed with the Toronto Argonauts. In 2022, he played and started in 17 regular season games, where he recorded 49 defensive tackles, two special teams tackles, four pass knockdowns, and four interceptions.

In the 2023 season, Amos played and started in the first nine regular season games, recording 15 defensive tackles, three pass knockdowns, and two interceptions, including one returned for a touchdown. He suffered an injury in the team's ninth game of the season against the Calgary Stampeders and was on the injured list for the rest of the season.

In the 2024 season, Amos played in all 18 regular season games, starting in 17, as he was a backup in the meaningless final regular season game. He recorded 25 defensive tackles, five interceptions, three pass knockdowns, and two fumble recoveries. Amos started in all three post-season games, including the 111th Grey Cup, where he recorded two defensive tackles and one interception in the Argonauts' 41–24 victory over the Winnipeg Blue Bombers. He became a free agent upon the expiry of his contract on February 11, 2025.

=== Hamilton Tiger-Cats ===
On February 11, 2025, Amos signed a one-year contract with the Hamilton Tiger-Cats. He played in 18 regular season games where he had 45 defensive tackles and four interceptions. He was later named to the East Division All-CFL team. He became a free agent upon the expiry of his contract on February 10, 2026.

=== Toronto Argonauts (second stint) ===
On February 10, 2026, it was announced that Amos had signed again with the Toronto Argonauts.
