= Keric Wheatfall =

American gridiron football player (born 1999)

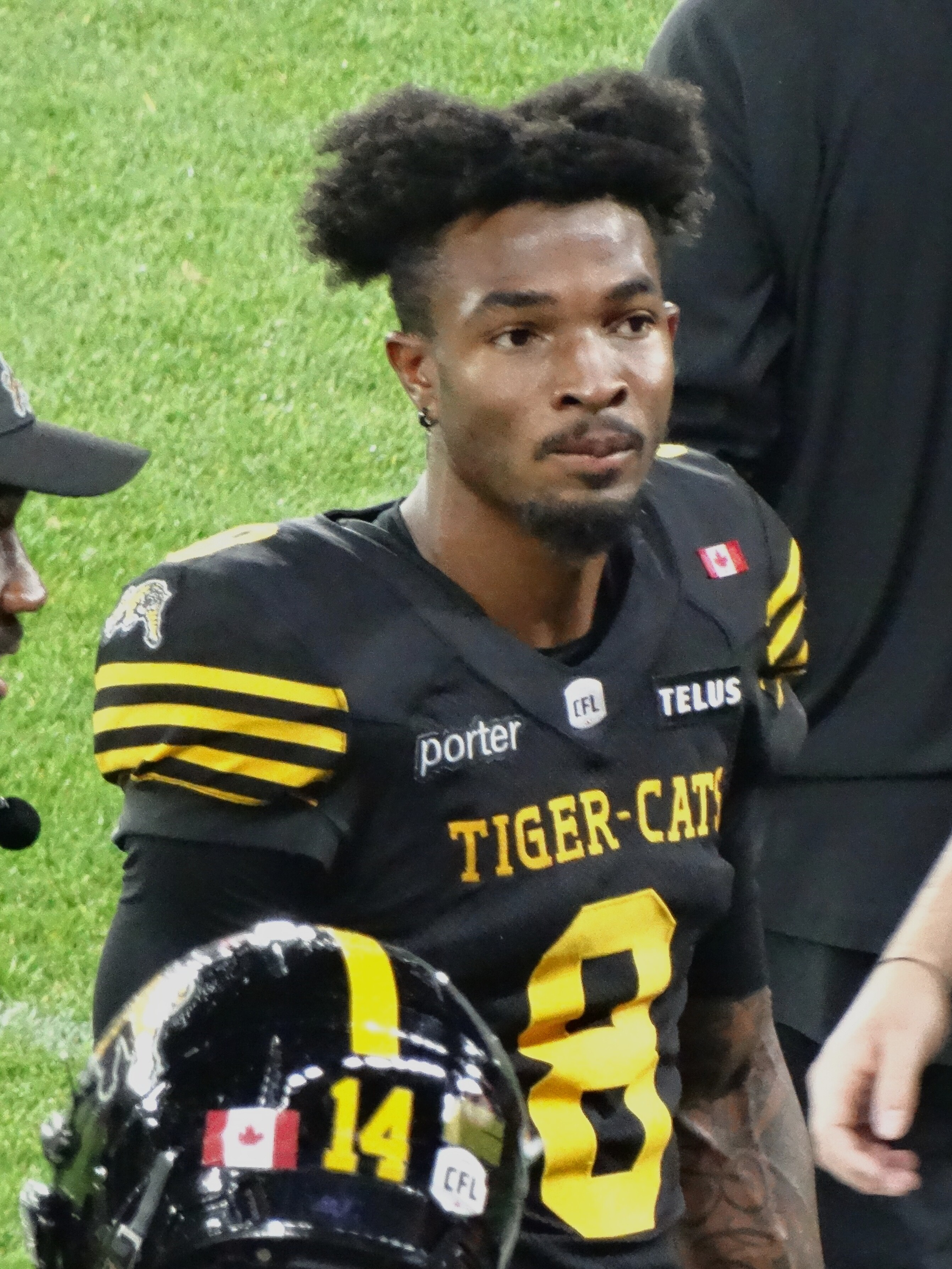
- Wheatfall with the Hamilton Tiger-Cats in 2026

No. 8 – Hamilton Tiger-Cats
- Position: Wide receiver
- Roster status: Active
- CFL status: American

Personal information
- Born: April 20, 1999 (age 27); Brenham, Texas, U.S.
- Listed height: 6 ft 1 in (1.85 m)
- Listed weight: 187 lb (85 kg)

Career information
- High school: Cypress Ranch (Cypress, Texas)
- College: Fresno State (2019–2021); Blinn College (2017–2018)

Career history
- Philadelphia Eagles (2022)*; Philadelphia Stars (2023); Winnipeg Blue Bombers (2024–2025); Hamilton Tiger-Cats (2026–present)
- * Offseason or practice squad member only
- Stats at CFL.ca

Keric Wheatfall (born April 20, 1999) is an American professional football wide receiver for the Hamilton Tiger-Cats of the Canadian Football League (CFL).

== College career ==
Wheatfall first played college football for the Blinn College Buccaneers in 2017 where he recorded 25 receptions for 375 yards and one touchdown. In 2018, he had 47 catches for 798 yards and six touchdowns and drew interest from NCAA Division I teams.

Wheatfall transferred to California State University, Fresno in 2019 and joined the Bulldogs football team. He played in 28 games from 2019 to 2021 where he had 78 receptions for 1,286 yards and six touchdowns.

== Professional career ==
Pre-draft measurables
Height	Weight	Arm length	Hand span	Wingspan	40-yard dash	10-yard split	20-yard split	20-yard shuttle	Vertical jump	Broad jump
6 ft 1 1/8 in (1.86 m)	194 lb (88 kg)	30 5/8 in (0.78 m)	8 3/4 in (0.22 m)	6 ft 1 3/8 in (1.86 m)	4.58 s	1.59 s	2.69 s	4.31 s	35.5 in (0.90 m)	10 ft 0 in (3.05 m)
All values from Pro Day

=== Philadelphia Eagles ===
After going unselected in the 2022 NFL draft, Wheatfall was signed by the Philadelphia Eagles as an undrafted free agent. However, after suffering a hamstring injury, he was waived by the Eagles on August 11, 2022. At the end of training camp, he was released on August 29, 2023.

=== Philadelphia Stars ===
In 2023, Wheatfall played with the Philadelphia Stars where he played in three games and was mostly featured on special teams.

=== Winnipeg Blue Bombers ===
On January 23, 2024, it was announced that Wheatfall had signed with the Winnipeg Blue Bombers. Following training camp in 2024, he accepted a practice roster spot with the team. However, following an injury to fellow receiver Kenny Lawler in the team's opening game, Wheatfall played and started in his first CFL game on June 13, 2024, against the Ottawa Redblacks where he had three catches for 111 yards. In the team's next game, he injured his hamstring and was placed on the six-game injured list. He returned to the lineup for the last five games of the regular season and scored his first touchdown on September 27, 2024, against the Edmonton Elks, on a 61-yard pass from Zach Collaros. He finished the regular season having played and started in seven games where he had 13 catches for 273 yards and one touchdown. He became a free agent upon the expiry of his contract on February 10, 2026.

=== Hamilton Tiger-Cats ===
On February 10, 2026, it was announced that Wheatfall had signed a two-year contract with the Hamilton Tiger-Cats.

== Personal life ==
Wheatfall was born to parents Kerry and Carol Wheatfall and has five brothers, Kerry Jr., Gerrald, KT, Isaiah, and Colten.
