= Anim Dankwah =

Canadian gridiron football player (born 2000)

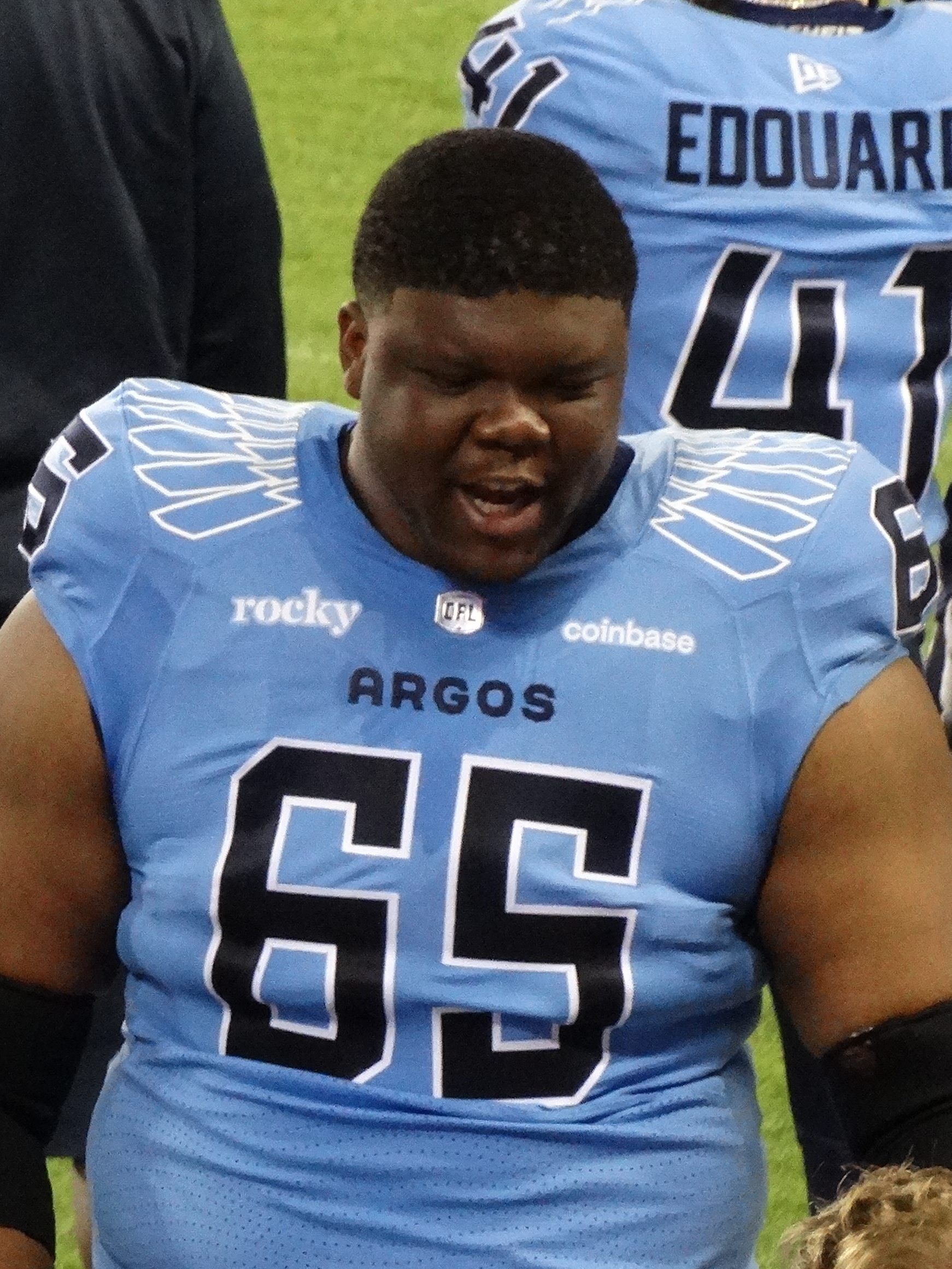
- Dankwah with the Toronto Argonauts in 2025

Profile
- Position: Offensive lineman

Personal information
- Born: October 19, 2000 (age 26); Accra, Ghana
- Listed height: 6 ft 8 in (2.03 m)
- Listed weight: 355 lb (161 kg)

Career information
- High school: Taft School; St. Roch Catholic Secondary
- University: Howard (2019–2023)
- CFL draft: 2024: 6th round, 48th overall pick

Career history
- 2024: Philadelphia Eagles*
- 2024: Washington Commanders*
- 2025–2026: Toronto Argonauts
- 2026: Ottawa Redblacks
- * Offseason or practice squad member only

Awards and highlights
- First team All-MEAC (2022); Second team All-MEAC (2021)
- Stats at CFL.ca

Anim Dankwah (born October 19, 2000) is a Canadian professional football offensive lineman. He played college football for the Howard Bison.

== University career ==
Dankwah played college football for the Howard Bison from 2019 to 2024 where he played in 33 games.

== Professional career ==
Pre-draft measurables
Height	Weight	Arm length	Hand span	Wingspan	40-yard dash	10-yard split	20-yard split	20-yard shuttle	Three-cone drill	Vertical jump	Broad jump	Bench press
6 ft 7 3/4 in (2.03 m)	353 lb (160 kg)	35 1/8 in (0.89 m)	9 3/4 in (0.25 m)	7 ft 1 1/2 in (2.17 m)	5.44 s	1.89 s	3.25 s	5.21 s	8.46 s	27.5 in (0.70 m)	7 ft 4 in (2.24 m)	24 reps
All values from NFL Combine/Pro Day

Dankwah went undrafted in the 2024 NFL draft and was drafted in the sixth round, 48th overall, in the 2024 CFL draft by the Toronto Argonauts.

=== Philadelphia Eagles ===
On April 27, 2024, Dankwah signed with the Philadelphia Eagles. He was waived at the end of the preseason on August 27, 2024.

=== Washington Commanders ===
On September 10, 2024, it was announced that Dankwah had signed a practice squad agreement with the Washington Commanders. He was later released on October 29, 2024. Following the end of the 2024 season, he signed again with the team on January 8, 2025. He was released again on May 12, 2025.

=== Toronto Argonauts ===
On May 17, 2025, Dankwah signed with the Toronto Argonauts. Following training camp in 2025, he began the season on the practice roster, but soon after made his CFL debut on June 20, 2025, against the Saskatchewan Roughriders. He played in four regular season games in 2025 including one start at right tackle. He made the team's active roster following training camp in 2026 and dressed in the first four regular season games as a backup offensive lineman. However, he was later released on July 9, 2026.

=== Ottawa Redblacks ===
On September 4, 2026, it was announced that Dankwah had signed with the Ottawa Redblacks. On October 26, he was released.

== Personal life ==
Dankwah was born in Accra, Ghana, but moved to Brampton, Ontario, with his family.
