= Benjie Franklin =

American gridiron football player (born 1996)

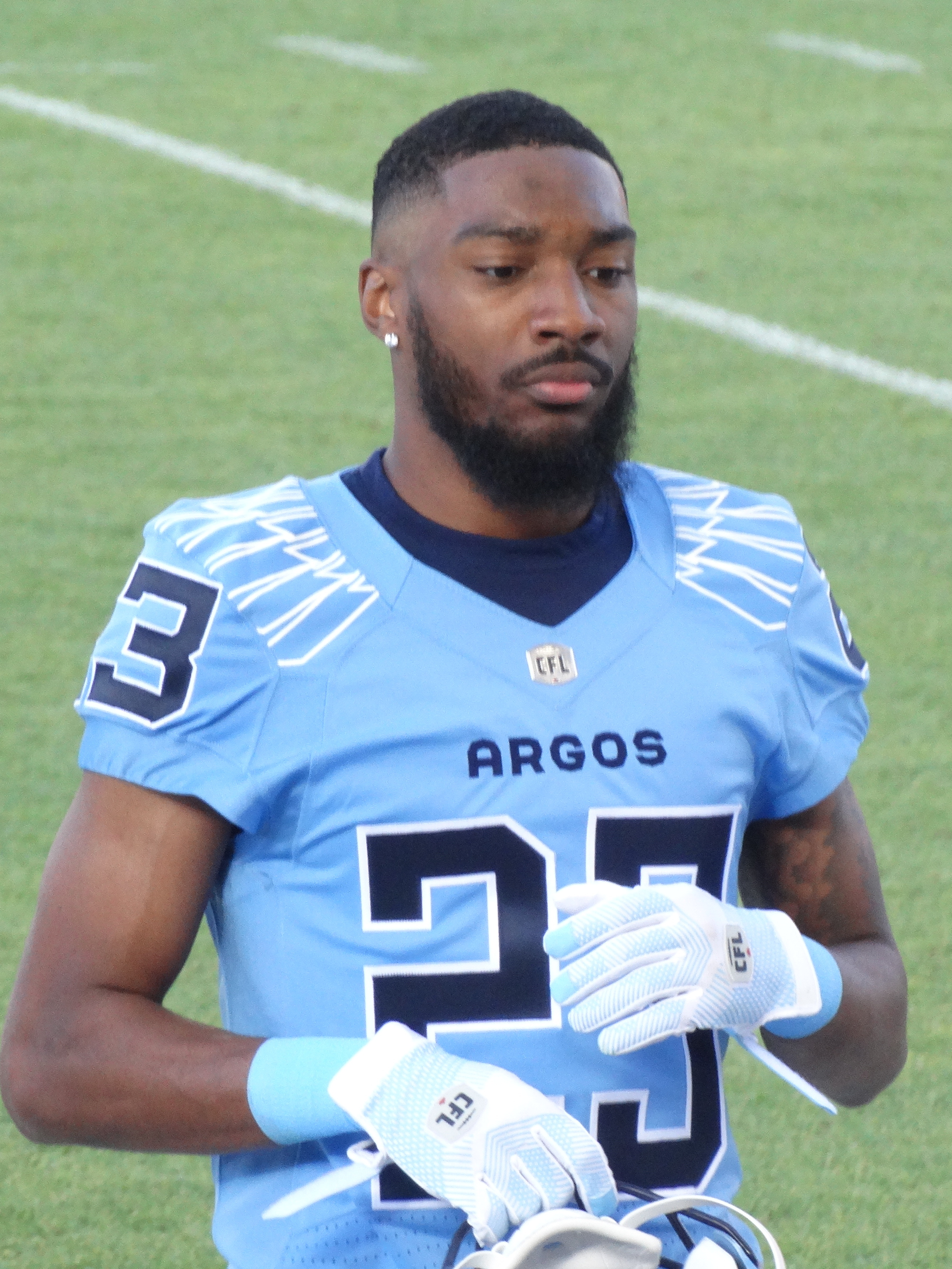
- Franklin with the Toronto Argonauts in 2024

No. 23 – Toronto Argonauts
- Position: Defensive back
- Roster status: Active
- CFL status: American

Personal information
- Born: October 22, 1996 (age 30); Houston, Texas, U.S.
- Listed height: 6 ft 0 in (1.83 m)
- Listed weight: 185 lb (84 kg)

Career information
- High school: Alief Taylor High
- College: Tarleton State

Career history
- 2023: Jacksonville Jaguars*
- 2023: Green Bay Packers*
- 2023: Seattle Seahawks*
- 2023: Toronto Argonauts
- 2024: San Antonio Brahmas*
- 2024–present: Toronto Argonauts
- * Offseason or practice squad member only

Awards and highlights
- Grey Cup champion (2024); CFL East All-Star (2026)
- Stats at CFL.ca

Benjie Franklin (born October 22, 1996) is an American professional football defensive back for the Toronto Argonauts of the Canadian Football League (CFL).

== College career ==
Franklin first played college football for the Navarro Bulldogs from 2017 to 2018. He then transferred to Tarleton State University to play for the Texans from 2019 to 2021. He played in 29 games for the Texans where he recorded 103 tackles, eight interceptions, and one fumble recovery.

== Professional career ==
Pre-draft measurables
Height	Weight	Arm length	Hand span	Wingspan	40-yard dash	10-yard split	20-yard split	20-yard shuttle	Three-cone drill	Vertical jump	Broad jump	Bench press
5 ft 11 1/2 in (1.82 m)	172 lb (78 kg)	31 3/8 in (0.80 m)	8 3/8 in (0.21 m)	6 ft 2 7/8 in (1.90 m)	4.32 s	1.48 s	2.52 s	4.33 s	6.81 s	33.5 in (0.85 m)	10 ft 4 in (3.15 m)	2 reps
All values from Pro Day

=== Jacksonville Jaguars ===
Franklin signed with the Jacksonville Jaguars as an undrafted free agent on May 2, 2022. However, he was part of the final cuts on August 29, 2022.

=== Green Bay Packers ===
On September 1, 2022, Franklin signed with the Green Bay Packers. He spent the season on the practice roster and was re-signed on January 19, 2023. He was later released on May 17, 2023.

=== Seattle Seahawks ===
On June 1, 2023, Franklin was signed by the Seattle Seahawks. At the end of the preseason, he was released on August 27, 2023.

=== Toronto Argonauts (first stint) ===
Franklin signed with the Toronto Argonauts on September 12, 2023, to a practice roster agreement. With the Argonauts having already clinched first place in the division, he made his professional debut in the last game of the regular season on October 28, 2023, against the Ottawa Redblacks, where he recorded four defensive tackles and one interception. He then reverted to the practice roster and his contract expired on November 13, 2023.

=== San Antonio Brahmas ===
On January 20, 2024, Franklin signed with the San Antonio Brahmas. He was released near the end of training camp on March 10, 2024.

=== Toronto Argonauts (second stint) ===
Franklin re-signed with the Argonauts on April 2, 2024. He won a starting job following training camp in 2024 and started the first four games of the season. He was relegated to backup duty in the team's fifth game of the season against the Montreal Alouettes, but regained his starter's role for the remainder of the year as his play progressed. He played in 18 regular season games, starting in 17, where he had 59 defensive tackles, two special teams tackles, two interceptions, 13 pass knockdowns, one sack, three forced fumbles, three fumble recoveries, and one blocked kick.

In the East Semi-Final against the Ottawa Redblacks, Franklin had eight defensive tackles and his first career touchdown on a 71-yard interception return. Against the Alouettes in East Final, he had a second straight game with a pick-six and had four defensive tackles and two interceptions in the team's 30–28 victory. In the 111th Grey Cup, Franklin recorded his third straight post-season game with an interception where he also had three defensive tackles in the Argonauts' 41–24 victory over the Winnipeg Blue Bombers.
