= CHAH (AM) =

Radio station in Edmonton, Alberta

- Edmonton, Alberta; Canada
- Frequency: 580 kHz
- Branding: My Radio 580

Programming
- Format: Multilingual

Ownership
- Owner: My Radio 580 Ltd.

History
- First air date: September 28, 2020

Technical information
- Class: B
- ERP: 10,000 watts (fulltime)

Links
- Website: myradio580.com

CHAH is a Canadian radio station, broadcasting at 580 AM in Edmonton, Alberta. The station airs a multilingual programming format branded as My Radio 580 and is owned by My Radio 580 Ltd.

== History ==
On January 6, 2017, the Canadian Radio-television and Telecommunications Commission (CRTC) approved an application by 1811258 Alberta Ltd. for a broadcasting licence to operate an ethnic commercial AM radio station in Edmonton. The new station would operate on the frequency of 580 kHz with a power of 10,000 watts fulltime.

AM 580 was a frequency in Edmonton that was once occupied by CKUA from 1927 until it went off the air in 2013.

On September 28, 2020, after on-air testing began in the summer, the station officially signed on the air as My Radio 580.

In July 2023, the station broadcast coverage of an Edmonton Elks Canadian Football League game in the Punjabi language, called by Harpreet Pandher and Taqdeer Thindal (who have also participated as commentators on Hockey Night in Canada: Punjabi Edition); it was stated to be the first ever broadcast of a professional gridiron football game in the language in North America. In April 2024, the team and CHAH announced that it would produce a full schedule of Elks games in Punjabi beginning in the 2024 season.
