= Robert Priester =

American gridiron football player (born 1993)

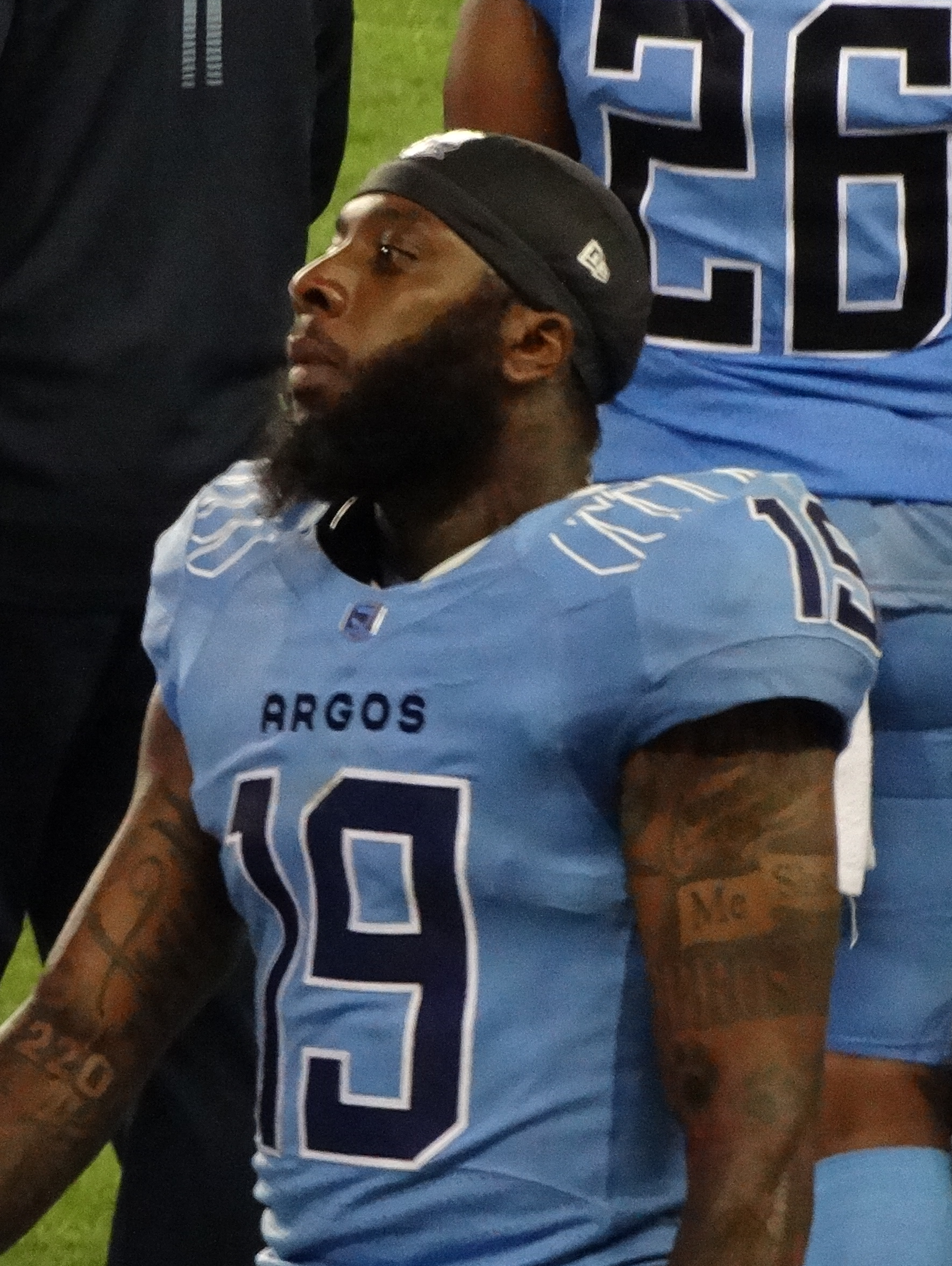
- Priester with the Toronto Argonauts in 2024

Toronto Argonauts
- Position: Defensive back
- Roster status: Active
- CFL status: American

Personal information
- Born: December 25, 1993 (age 32); Tampa, Florida, U.S.
- Listed height: 5 ft 9 in (1.75 m)
- Listed weight: 180 lb (82 kg)

Career information
- High school: Robinson High
- College: Wyoming (2014–2017)
- NFL draft: 2018: undrafted

Career history
- 2018: Winnipeg Blue Bombers
- 2019: Edmonton Eskimos*
- 2020: Tampa Bay Vipers
- 2021: Edmonton Elks*
- 2022: Winnipeg Blue Bombers*
- 2022–2024: Toronto Argonauts
- 2025: Ottawa Redblacks
- 2026–present: Toronto Argonauts
- * Offseason or practice squad member only

Awards and highlights
- 2× Grey Cup champion (2022, 2024)
- Stats at CFL.ca

Robert Priester (born December 25, 1993) is an American professional football defensive back for the Toronto Argonauts of the Canadian Football League (CFL). He is a two-time Grey Cup champion after winning with the Argonauts in 2022 and 2024.

== College career ==
Priester played college football for the Wyoming Cowboys from 2014 to 2017. He played in 36 games where he had 139 tackles, one interception, one sack, three forced fumbles, and three fumble recoveries.

== Professional career ==
Pre-draft measurables
Height	Weight	Arm length	Hand span	Wingspan	40-yard dash	10-yard split	20-yard split	20-yard shuttle	Three-cone drill	Vertical jump	Broad jump	Bench press
5 ft 9 in (1.75 m)	178 lb (81 kg)	30 7/8 in (0.78 m)	8 5/8 in (0.22 m)	6 ft 0 3/8 in (1.84 m)	4.60 s	1.62 s	2.62 s	4.28 s	6.93 s	30.5 in (0.77 m)	9 ft 7 in (2.92 m)	13 reps
All values from Pro Day

=== Winnipeg Blue Bombers (first stint) ===
On May 22, 2018, Priester signed with the Winnipeg Blue Bombers. Following 2018 training camp, he was placed on the team's practice roster, but made his professional debut on September 8, 2018, against the Saskatchewan Roughriders in the Banjo Bowl, where he recorded three defensive tackles. He played in the team's next game against the Montreal Alouettes before returning to the practice roster and ultimately being released on October 16, 2018.

=== Edmonton Eskimos (first stint) ===
After the conclusion of the 2018 CFL season, Priester signed with the Edmonton Eskimos on December 17, 2018. He retired following training camp in 2019, but returned to the team on September 16, 2019, and spent one month on the practice roster before being released on October 21, 2019.

=== Tampa Bay Vipers ===
Priester played for his hometown Tampa Bay Vipers in 2020, where he started five games and recorded seven tackles, one sack, and one interception. He had his contract terminated when the league suspended operations on April 10, 2020.

=== Edmonton Football Team / Elks (second stint) ===
On December 30, 2020, Priester re-signed with the Edmonton Football Team. He was part of the final training camp cuts by the newly named Elks on July 29, 2021.

=== Winnipeg Blue Bombers (second stint) ===
Priester signed with the Blue Bombers on March 28, 2022. However, he was released before the start of training camp on May 9, 2022.

=== Toronto Argonauts (first stint) ===
On May 21, 2022, Priester was signed by the Toronto Argonauts. Following 2022 training camp, he made the active roster and became the starting cover linebacker while Chris Edwards served a three-game suspension. He played in 12 games, starting in six, where he had 28 defensive tackles, five special teams tackles, two pass knockdowns, one sack, and two forced fumbles. He played in the team's East Final game where he had three defensive tackles and played in his first Grey Cup game, against the team that released him earlier that year, the Winnipeg Blue Bombers. In the 109th Grey Cup, he had one defensive tackle and one special teams tackle as the Argonauts won 24–23, as Priester won his first championship.

In 2023, Priester played in just five games, starting in one, where he had three defensive tackles, while spending most of the year on the injured list. He became a free agent upon the expiry of his contract on February 13, 2024.

After remaining unsigned to start the 2024 CFL season, he re-signed with the Argonauts on July 1, 2024. Following an injury to Quincy Mauger, Priester became the team's starting cover linebacker. He played in 11 regular season games, starting in 10, where he had 28 defensive tackles, one sack, two pass knockdowns, one forced fumble, and one fumble recovery. He was injured for the last four games of the regular season and also sat out both of the team's playoff games. However, he returned to play in the 111th Grey Cup where he had one interception in the Argonauts' 41–24 victory over the Winnipeg Blue Bombers.

=== Ottawa Redblacks ===
On February 10, 2025, it was announced that Priester had signed with the Ottawa Redblacks. He played in 15 regular season games where he had 27 defensive tackles, three special teams tackles, two interceptions, and one forced fumble. He became a free agent upon the expiry of his contract on February 10, 2026.

=== Toronto Argonauts (second stint) ===
It was announced on February 10, 2026, that Priester had signed again with the Toronto Argonauts.
