= Tarvarus McFadden =

American gridiron football player (born 1997)

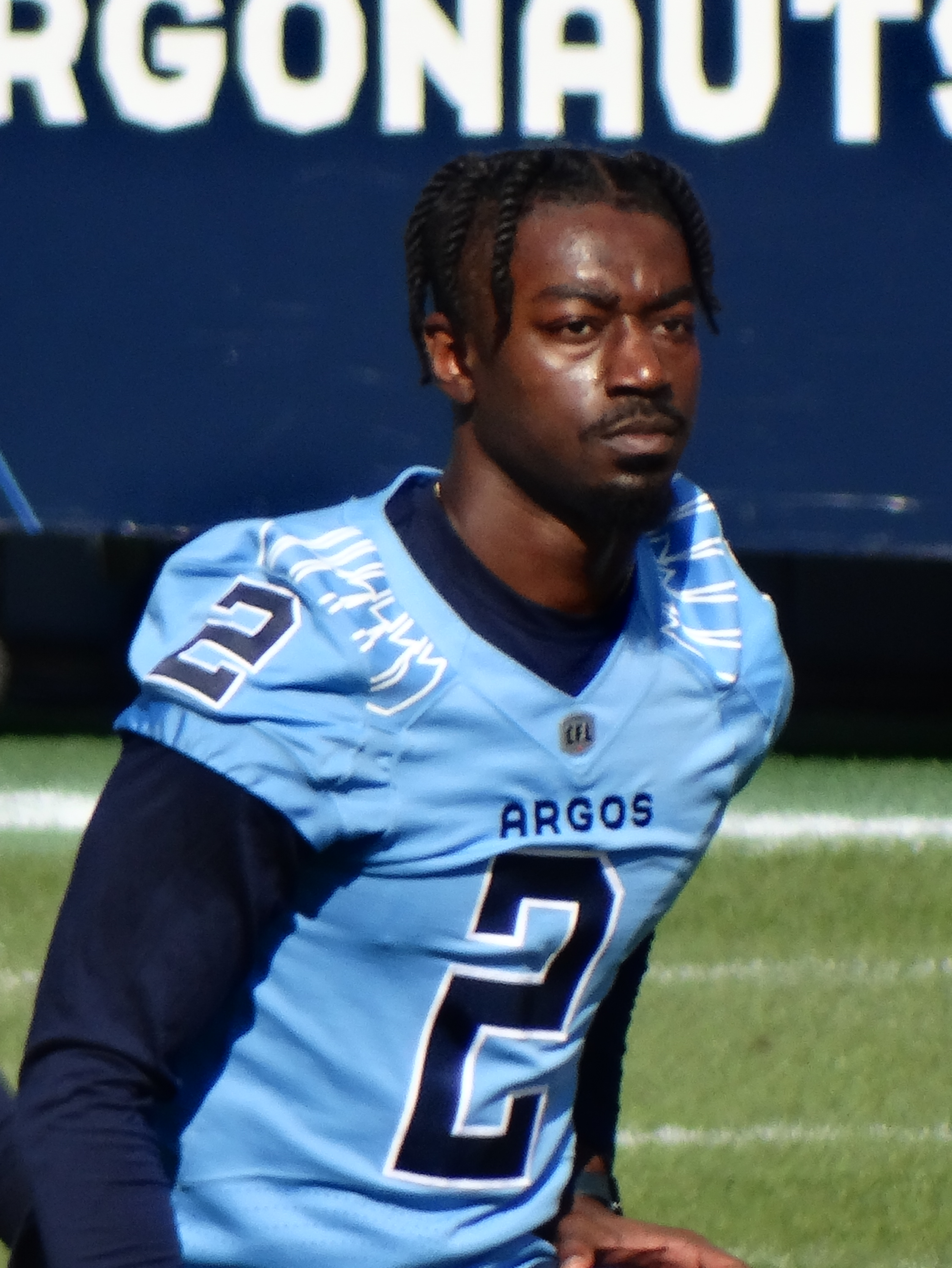
- McFadden with the Toronto Argonauts in 2024

No. 2 – Toronto Argonauts
- Position: Defensive back
- Roster status: Active
- CFL status: American

Personal information
- Born: January 28, 1997 (age 29); Fort Lauderdale, Florida, U.S.
- Listed height: 6 ft 2 in (1.88 m)
- Listed weight: 198 lb (90 kg)

Career information
- High school: American Heritage School (Plantation, Florida)
- College: Florida State (2015–2018)
- NFL draft: 2018: undrafted

Career history
- San Francisco 49ers (2018)*; Indianapolis Colts (2018)*; San Francisco 49ers (2018–2019)*; Detroit Lions (2019)*; Tampa Bay Vipers (2020); Toronto Argonauts (2021–2023); Ottawa Redblacks (2024)*; Toronto Argonauts (2024–present)
- * Offseason or practice squad member only

Awards and highlights
- 2× Grey Cup champion (2022, 2024); CFL East All-Star (2025); Jack Tatum Trophy (2016); First-team All-American (2016); First-team All-ACC (2016); Second-team All-ACC (2017); Mid Season All-XFL (2020)
- Stats at Pro Football Reference
- Stats at CFL.ca

Tarvarus McFadden (born January 28, 1997) is an American professional football defensive back for the Toronto Argonauts of the Canadian Football League (CFL). He is a two-time Grey Cup champion after winning with the Argonauts in 2022 and 2024. He played college football at Florida State, and was signed by the San Francisco 49ers as an undrafted free agent in 2018. He has also played for the Tampa Bay Vipers of the XFL.

== Early life ==
McFadden attended American Heritage High School in Plantation, Florida. As a senior, he led his school to a second consecutive 5A state championship by tallying five interceptions, 41 tackles, six pass breakups, two forced fumbles and scoring five total touchdowns in four different ways (one pick six, two punt returns, one kickoff, one reception). He was named into 5A All-State First-team and American Family Insurance Florida All-State Team honors, named the 2014 All-Broward Defensive Player of the Year and to the All-Broward County Team, and MaxPreps Medium School All-American.

He was rated as a five-star recruit by Scout.com, Rivals.com, 247Sports.com, and ESPN.com. He was ranked as the nation's No. 3 defensive back in the class of 2015 by Rivals.com and 247Sports.com, No. 4 by Scout.com and No. 5 by ESPN.com. He was ranked as the nation's No. 13 overall player by Rivals.com, No. 17 by Scout.com, No. 19 by 247Sports.com and No. 47 by ESPN.com. He committed to Florida State University to play college football.

== College career ==
=== Freshman season ===
As a freshman at Florida State in 2015, McFadden played in limited playing time and had only four tackles and one kickoff return for 26 yards.

=== Sophomore season ===
As a sophomore, he took over as the starter, finishing with eight interceptions on the season, tied for the most in the country and second-most in FSU single-season history en route to first-team All-America honors from the FWAA and Phil Steele, All-ACC First-team accolades, was one of five finalists for the Bronko Nagurski Award, which is given to the nation's top defensive player, and collected the Jack Tatum Trophy, given to the nation's top defensive back by the Touchdown Club of Columbus. He was also named first-team All-ACC and was also a finalist for the Bronko Nagurski Trophy. Along with his eight interceptions, McFadden also totaled 20 tackles, including three tackles for loss, and six pass breakups.

=== Junior season ===
McFadden finished his junior season, totaling 30 tackles, 10 pass breakups and returning a blocked field goal 63 yards for a touchdown against Delaware State. He also earned second-team All-ACC and was named to the preseason Chuck Bednarik Award, Bronko Nagurski Award and Jim Thorpe Award watch list.

== Professional career ==
Pre-draft measurables
Height	Weight	Arm length	Hand span	Wingspan	40-yard dash	10-yard split	20-yard split	20-yard shuttle	Three-cone drill	Vertical jump	Broad jump
6 ft 2 1/4 in (1.89 m)	204 lb (93 kg)	32 1/2 in (0.83 m)	10 3/8 in (0.26 m)	6 ft 6 in (1.98 m)	4.58 s	1.55 s	2.69 s	4.45 s	7.00 s	38.5 in (0.98 m)	10 ft 1 in (3.07 m)
All values from NFL Combine/Pro Day

=== San Francisco 49ers (first stint) ===
McFadden signed with the San Francisco 49ers as an undrafted free agent on May 1, 2018. He was waived on September 1, 2018.

=== Indianapolis Colts ===
On September 11, 2018, McFadden was signed to the Indianapolis Colts' practice squad. He was released on September 24, 2018.

=== San Francisco 49ers (second stint) ===
On November 8, 2018, McFadden was signed to the 49ers practice squad. He signed a reserve/future contract with the 49ers on January 2, 2019. He was waived on April 29, 2019.

=== Detroit Lions ===
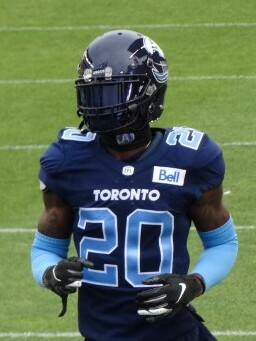
McFadden with the Argonauts in 2022

On August 4, 2019, McFadden was signed by the Detroit Lions. He was waived/injured two days later and placed on injured reserve. He was released on August 10.

=== Tampa Bay Vipers ===
McFadden was signed by the Tampa Bay Vipers of the XFL on December 22, 2019. He had his contract terminated when the league suspended operations on April 10, 2020.

=== Toronto Argonauts (first stint) ===
On February 15, 2021, McFadden signed with the Toronto Argonauts of the Canadian Football League (CFL). He was released during training camp that year, but re-signed with the team in November as a practice squad member. In 2022, he played in all 18 games where he recorded 42 defensive tackles and two interceptions. McFadden also started at cornerback in the 109th Grey Cup where he had four defensive tackles in the victory over the Winnipeg Blue Bombers.

In 2023, McFadden played in 15 regular season games and recorded 23 defensive tackles, two interceptions, and two forced fumbles. He played in both preseason games in 2024, but was part of the final cuts on June 1, 2024.

=== Ottawa Redblacks ===
On June 16, 2024, it was announced that McFadden had signed a practice roster agreement with the Ottawa Redblacks. He remained on the practice roster until he was released on July 10, 2024.

=== Toronto Argonauts (second stint) ===
On July 23, 2024, it was announced that McFadden had re-signed with the Argonauts. In his first game back with the Argonauts, on July 27, 2024, he scored his first professional touchdown when he intercepted Zach Collaros and returned it for the score in the team's overtime win over the Winnipeg Blue Bombers. In the 2024 season, McFadden played and started in 12 regular season games where he had 29 defensive tackles, nine pass knockdowns, and two interceptions. He started in all three post-season games, including the 111th Grey Cup where he had one defensive tackle in the Argonauts' 41–24 victory over the Winnipeg Blue Bombers.
