= 2022 Toronto Argonauts season =

CFL team season

- General manager: Michael Clemons
- President: Bill Manning
- Head coach: Ryan Dinwiddie
- Home stadium: BMO Field

Results
- Record: 11–7
- Division place: 1st, East
- Playoffs: Won Grey Cup
- Team MOP: McLeod Bethel-Thompson
- Team MODP: Wynton McManis
- Team MOC: Kurleigh Gittens Jr.
- Team MOOL: Dejon Allen
- Team MOST: Daniel Adeboboye
- Team MOR: Gregor MacKellar

Uniform
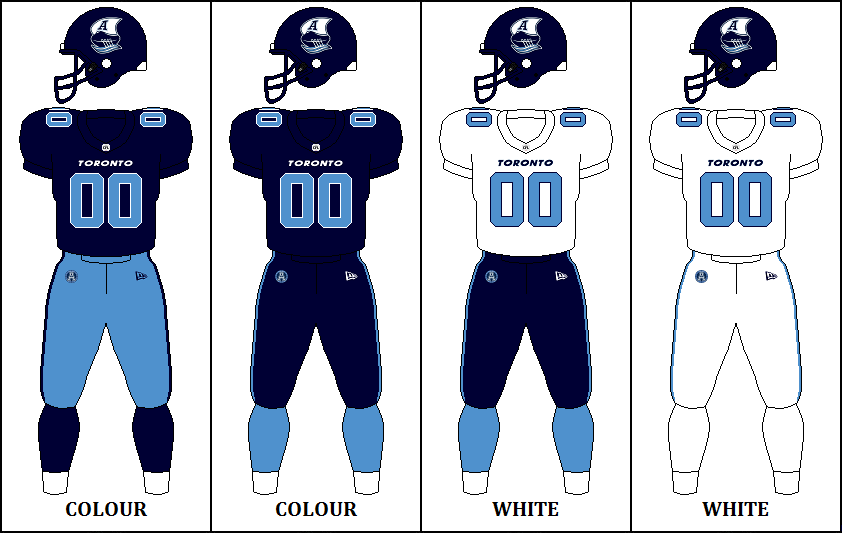

The 2022 Toronto Argonauts season was the 64th season for the team in the Canadian Football League (CFL) and their 149th year of existence. The Argonauts won the 109th Grey Cup over the Winnipeg Blue Bombers by a score of 24–23. This was the 18th time the Argonauts have won the championship, a league record. The Argonauts held their training camp on the campus of the University of Guelph in Guelph, Ontario.

The 2022 CFL season was the second season for head coach Ryan Dinwiddie and the third season for Michael Clemons as general manager.

== Offseason ==
=== CFL global draft ===
The 2022 CFL global draft took place on May 3, 2022. With the format being a snake draft, the Argonauts selected fourth in the odd-numbered rounds and sixth in the even-numbered rounds.

Round	Pick	Player	Position	University/Club Team	Nationality
1	4	John Haggerty	P	Western Kentucky	Australia
2	15	Simeon Okonta-Wariso	DL	Lübeck Cougars	(United Kingdom) Great Britain
3	22	Otavio Amorim	OL	Berlin Thunder	Brazil

== CFL national draft ==
The 2022 CFL draft took place on May 3, 2022. The Argonauts had the sixth selection in each of the eight rounds of the draft after losing the East Final and finishing third in the 2021 league standings. The team also acquired another second-round pick after trading Nick Arbuckle to the Edmonton Elks.

Round	Pick	Player	Position	School	Hometown
1	6	Gregor MacKellar	OL	St. Francis Xavier	Timberlea, NS
2	10	Deionte Knight	DL	Western Ontario	Ajax, ON
2	15	Daniel Adeboboye	RB	Bryant	Toronto, ON
3	26	Enoch Penney-Laryea	DL	McMaster	Kingston, Jamaica
4	35	Braydon Noll	OL	Wilfrid Laurier	Orangeville, ON
5	44	Daniel Kwamou	LB	British Columbia	Calgary, AB
6	53	Eric Sutton	DB	Texas State	Regina, SK
7	62	Chase Arseneau	TE	McMaster	Trabuco Canyon, CA
8	71	Michael Pezzuto	DE	Ottawa	Montreal, QC

== Preseason ==
The Argonauts played their home preseason game at Alumni Stadium in Guelph, Ontario.

=== Schedule ===
Week	Game	Date	Kickoff	Opponent	Results		TV	Venue	Attendance	Summary
Week	Game	Date	Kickoff	Opponent	Score	Record	TV	Venue	Attendance	Summary
A	1	Fri, May 27	7:30 p.m. EDT	at Ottawa Redblacks	L 17–23	0–1	TSN	TD Place Stadium	NA	Recap
B	2	Fri, June 3	7:30 p.m. EDT	vs. Hamilton Tiger-Cats	W 18–17	1–1	None	Alumni Stadium	NA	Recap

# Games played with colour uniforms.

== Regular season ==
=== Standings ===
East Division
Team	GP	W	L	T	Pts	PF	PA	Div	Stk	
Toronto Argonauts	18	11	7	0	22	443	415	7–3	L1	Details
Montreal Alouettes	18	9	9	0	18	471	466	5–5	W1	Details
Hamilton Tiger-Cats	18	8	10	0	16	421	473	5–5	W4	Details
Ottawa Redblacks	18	4	14	0	8	370	475	3–7	L3	Details

=== Schedule ===
The Argonauts were the home team for a neutral site game for the Week 6 match-up with the Saskatchewan Roughriders. It was confirmed on March 24, 2022, that the game would be played in Wolfville, Nova Scotia at Raymond Field as part of the Touchdown Atlantic series. Due to a COVID-19 outbreak among the Roughriders, the week 7 game against the Roughriders was rescheduled from July 23 to July 24.

Week	Game	Date	Kickoff	Opponent	Results		TV	Venue	Attendance	Summary
Week	Game	Date	Kickoff	Opponent	Score	Record	TV	Venue	Attendance	Summary
1	Bye									
2	1	Thu, June 16	7:30 p.m. EDT	vs. Montreal Alouettes	W 20–19	1–0	TSN/RDS/ESPN2	BMO Field	12,498	Recap
3	2	Sat, June 25	10:00 p.m. EDT	at BC Lions	L 3–44	1–1	TSN/ESPN2	BC Place	14,006	Recap
4	3	Mon, July 4	7:30 p.m. EDT	vs. Winnipeg Blue Bombers	L 22–23	1–2	TSN/RDS	BMO Field	9,806	Recap
5	Bye									
6	4	Sat, July 16	2:00 p.m. EDT	Saskatchewan Roughriders	W 30–24	2–2	TSN/RDS	Raymond Field	10,886	Recap
7	5	Sun, July 24	7:00 p.m. EDT	at Saskatchewan Roughriders	W 31–21	3–2	TSN/RDS/ESPNews	Mosaic Stadium	27,134	Recap
8	6	Sun, July 31	5:00 p.m. EDT	vs. Ottawa Redblacks	L 13–23	3–3	TSN/RDS2	BMO Field	10,277	Recap
9	7	Sat, Aug 6	7:00 p.m. EDT	vs. Hamilton Tiger-Cats	W 34–20	4–3	TSN/ESPN2	BMO Field	11,623	Recap
10	8	Fri, Aug 12	7:30 p.m. EDT	at Hamilton Tiger-Cats	L 27–34	4–4	TSN/RDS	Tim Hortons Field	23,018	Recap
11	9	Sat, Aug 20	7:00 p.m. EDT	vs. Calgary Stampeders	L 19–22	4–5	TSN	BMO Field	12,584	Recap
12	10	Fri, Aug 26	7:30 p.m. EDT	vs. Hamilton Tiger-Cats	W 37–20	5–5	TSN/RDS	BMO Field	14,963	Recap
13	11	Mon, Sept 5	1:00 p.m. EDT	at Hamilton Tiger-Cats	W 28–8	6–5	TSN/RDS2	Tim Hortons Field	25,266	Recap
14	12	Sat, Sept 10	2:00 p.m. EDT	at Ottawa Redblacks	W 24–19	7–5	TSN/RDS2	TD Place Stadium	21,673	Recap
15	Bye									
16	13	Sat, Sept 24	7:00 p.m. EDT	at Ottawa Redblacks	W 45–15	8–5	TSN/RDS2	TD Place Stadium	18,355	Recap
17	14	Sat, Oct 1	7:00 p.m. EDT	at Calgary Stampeders	L 2–29	8–6	TSN	McMahon Stadium	21,299	Recap
18	15	Sat, Oct 8	4:00 p.m. EDT	vs. BC Lions	W 23–20	9–6	TSN	BMO Field	11,089	Recap
19	16	Sat, Oct 15	7:00 p.m. EDT	at Edmonton Elks	W 28–23	10–6	TSN	Commonwealth Stadium	25,723	Recap
20	17	Sat, Oct 22	4:00 p.m. EDT	at Montreal Alouettes	W 24–23	11–6	TSN/RDS	Molson Stadium	19,226	Recap
21	18	Sat, Oct 29	2:00 p.m. EDT	vs. Montreal Alouettes	L 33–38	11–7	TSN/RDS	BMO Field	13,155	Recap

# Games played with colour uniforms.
# Games played with white uniforms.

== Post-season ==
=== Schedule ===
Game	Date	Kickoff	Opponent	Results		TV	Venue	Attendance	Summary
Game	Date	Kickoff	Opponent	Score	Record	TV	Venue	Attendance	Summary
East Semi-Final	Bye								
East Final	Sun, Nov 13	1:00 p.m. EST	vs. Montreal Alouettes	W 34–27	1–0	TSN/RDS/ESPNews	BMO Field	21,331	Recap
109th Grey Cup	Sun, Nov 20	6:00 p.m. EST	Winnipeg Blue Bombers	W 24–23	2–0	TSN/RDS/ESPN2	Mosaic Stadium	33,350	Recap

# Games played with colour uniforms.

== Roster ==
2022 Toronto Argonauts final roster
**Quarterbacks**: 4 McLeod Bethel-Thompson; 12 Chad Kelly; **Running backs**: 21 Daniel Adeboboye; 44 Brandon Calver; 38 Declan Cross; 33 Andrew Harris; 32 Javon Leake; 34 A. J. Ouellette; **Receivers**: 17 Markeith Ambles; 16 Brandon Banks; 18 Dejon Brissett; 80 DaVaris Daniels; 19 Kurleigh Gittens; 81 Tommy Nield; 89 Cam Phillips	**Offensive linemen**: 59 Dejon Allen T; 65 Dariusz Bladek G; 53 Philip Blake T/G; 62 Ryan Hunter G/C; 54 Justin Lawrence C; 67 Gregor MacKellar G; 68 Shane Richards T/G; **Defensive linemen**: 96 Sam Acheampong DT; 95 Brandon Barlow DE; 91 Jared Brinkman DT; 56 Ja'Gared Davis DE; 99 Dewayne Hendrix DT; 93 Benoit Marion DT/DE; 2 Shawn Oakman DT; 40 Robbie Smith DE	**Linebackers**: 45 Jack Cassar; 43 Trevor Hoyte; 30 Jonathan Jones; 10 Henoc Muamba; **Defensive backs**: 8 DaShaun Amos; 6 Chris Edwards; 20 Tarvarus McFadden; 9 Royce Metchie; 3 Jamal Peters; 23 Robert Priester; 1 Shaquille Richardson; 36 Eric Sutton	**Special teams**: 14 Boris Bede K/P; 29 John Haggerty P; 46 Maxime Latour LS; **Practice roster**: 61 Kofi Appiah T; 41 Jonathan Edouard DB; 64 Dylan Giffen G; 82 Jeremiah Haydel WR; 26 Caleb Holden DB; 25 Eli Mencer LB; 57 Braydon Noll C; 74 Simeon Okonta-Wariso DE; 37 Enoch Penney-Laryea LB; 70 Toshiki Sato P/K	**Injured list**: 11 Juwan Brescacin SB; 66 Isiah Cage T; 39 Maurice Carnell DB; 51 Theren Churchill T/G; 86 Damonte Coxie WR; 0 Robertson Daniel DB; 98 Ali Fayad DE; 94 Fabion Foote DT; 27 Josh Hagerty DB; 13 Ben Holmes QB; 92 Deionte Knight DT; 48 Wynton McManis LB; 90 Damontre Moore DE; 52 Peter Nicastro C/G; 5 Shane Ray DE; 24 Eric Rogers WR; 35 Tigie Sankoh DB; 63 Trevon Tate T
Italics indicate American player • **Bold** indicates Global player

== Coaching staff ==
Toronto Argonauts staff
Front office and support staff: Owner – Maple Leaf Sports & Entertainment; President – Bill Manning; General manager – Michael Clemons; Assistant general manager – Vince Magri; Director of football operations and national scout – Alex Russell; Senior advisor – Jim Barker; Head athletic therapist – Josh Shewell; Assistant athletic therapist – Mark Belmore; Equipment manager – Danny Webb; Assistant equipment manager – David Sillberg; Strength and Conditioning - Usama Mujtaba; Manager, Football Media - Chris Balenovich	Head coaches: Head coach – Ryan Dinwiddie; Offensive coaches: Pass game coordinator and receivers – Pete Costanza; Offensive line – Kris Sweet; Quarterbacks – Mike Miller; Running backs and quality control – Edwin Harrison; Defensive coaches: Defensive coordinator and defensive line – Corey Mace; Linebackers – Kevin Eiben; Defensive backs – Josh Bell; Secondary – William Fields; Special teams coaches: Special teams coordinator – Mickey Donovan; → Coaching staff
