= List of Toronto Argonauts first-round draft picks =

The following is a list of first-round draft picks selected by the Toronto Argonauts of the Canadian Football League. The Argonauts participated in the first Canadian college draft in 1953 when only eastern teams were permitted to make selections. From 1960-1962, only eastern teams and the Calgary Stampeders participated in the draft as the other western clubs signed players from universities in their area. This list also includes all territorial exemptions from 1973, when teams were first permitted to selected players within their designated area, until 1985 when these exemptions were abolished.

The Toronto Argonauts have had the first overall selection in the draft 14 times since its inception in 1953, the most of any team. Since 1953, the Argonauts have lost their first round pick 18 times due to trades. Not including territorial exemptions, the most first-round picks the Argonauts have had in one year is four, which occurred in the 1982 CFL draft.

== Player selections ==
= CFL Division All-Star	= CFL All-Star	= Hall of Famer

Year	Pick	Player name	Position	College	Notes
1953	3	Geoff Crain	Quarterback	McGill	
1954	1	Bill McFarlane	Halfback	Toronto	
1955	2	Alex Macklin	Tackle	Toronto	
1956	5	Fred Smeale	End	Toronto	
1957	-	No pick	-	-	Traded to BC
1958	2	Paul Fedor	End	Queen's	
1959	1	Lorry Stacey	Defensive end	Toronto	
1960	1	Bill Mitchell	Tackle	Western Ontario	
1961	1	Casey Wood	Tackle	Toronto	Pick acquired from Hamilton
1961	4	Mike Wicklum	Halfback	Queen's	
1962	2	Gary Strickler	Linebacker	Queen's	
1963	1	John Wydareny	Defensive back	Western Ontario	
1964	1	Bill Watters	Fullback	Toronto	
1965	1	Jim Young	Wide receiver	Queen's	
1966	2	Ross Nicholson	Tackle	Western Ontario	
1967	1	Lawrence Barrett	Halfback	British Columbia	
1968	5	Chuck Liebrock	Offensive guard	Saint Mary's	
1969	-	No pick	-	-	Traded to BC
1970	-	No pick	-	-	Traded to Winnipeg
1971	-	No pick	-	-	Traded to Winnipeg
1972	8	Rick Chevers	Linebacker	Waterloo	
1973	Ex	Louis Clare	Tailback	Minnesota	
1973	Ex	Peter Mueller	Tight end	Western Illinois	
1973	2	Barry Finlay	Quarterback	McMaster	
1974	Ex	Larry Uteck	Defensive back	Wilfrid Laurier	
1974	Ex	Morris Zubkewych	Defensive tackle	Simon Fraser	
1974	1	Randy Halsall	Tackle	Wake Forest	Pick acquired from Winnipeg
1974	5	Larry Simpson	Tight end	Wilfrid Laurier	
1975	Ex	Paul Gilson	Defensive tackle	Guelph	
1975	Ex	Neil Mairs	Tailback	Otterbein	
1975	2	Allan Charuk	Wide receiver	Acadia	
1976	Ex	Neil Lumsden	Tailback	Ottawa	
1976	Ex	Steve Telfer	Tight end	Saint Mary's	
1976	Ex	Vic Wasilenko	Defensive back	British Columbia	
1977	Ex	Paul Bennett	Defensive back	Wilfrid Laurier	
1977	Ex	Mark Bragagnolo	Tailback	Toronto	
1977	2	Rick Sowieta	Linebacker	Richmond	
1978	5	Mark Brown	Tailback	Guelph	
1979	Ex	Mike McTague	Wide receiver	North Dakota	
1979	1	Kevin Powell	Offensive tackle	Utah State	
1980	Ex	Phil Jones	Defensive back	Simon Fraser	
1980	1	Greg Barrow	Offensive lineman	Florida	
1981	Ex	Hazen Carinci	Defensive back	Simon Fraser	
1981	Ex	Dan Ferrone	Offensive guard	Simon Fraser	
1981	Ex	Bernie Pickett	Tailback	Wilfrid Laurier	
1981	Ex	Bob Bronk	Tailback	Queen's	
1981	2	Tom Trifaux	Offensive tackle	Calgary	
1981	7	Tom Bray	Defensive tackle	Bishop's	
1981	8	Ronald Engleson	Defensive tackle	Simon Fraser	
1982	Ex	Geoff Townsend	Tailback	Boston College	
1982	Ex	Stephen Delcol	Defensive tackle	Simon Fraser	
1982	1	Mike Kirkley	Running back	Western Ontario	
1982	2	Greg Holmes	Wide receiver	Carroll College	
1982	6	Tony Antunovic	Offensive tackle	Simon Fraser	
1982	7	Chris Schultz	Defensive tackle	Arizona	
1983	Ex	Kelvin Pruenster	Offensive tackle	Cal-Poly	
1984	Ex	Sterling Hinds	Running back	Washington	
1985	-	No pick	-	-	Traded to Winnipeg
1986	3	Markus Koch	Defensive end	Boise State	
1987	-	No pick	-	-	Traded to BC
1988	-	No pick	-	-	Traded to BC
1989	-	No pick	-	-	Traded to BC
1990	4	Jock Climie	Wide receiver	Queen's	
1991	-	No pick	-	-	Traded to Saskatchewan
1992	-	No pick	-	-	Traded to Edmonton
1993	-	No pick	-	-	
1994	-	No pick	-	-	Traded to Ottawa
1995	3	Mark Montreuil	Defensive back	Concordia	
1996	2	Kelly Wiltshire	Cornerback	James Madison	
1997	1	Chad Folk	Offensive lineman	Utah	
1997	9	Matthew DuBuc	Slotback	Texas Tech	
1998	2	Dave Miller-Johnston	Punter/Kicker	Concordia	
1998	8	-	-	-	Forfeited due to selection in 1997 Supplemental Draft
1999	2	David De La Peralle	Offensive lineman	Kentucky	
2000	4	Donnavan Carter	Safety	Northern Illinois	
2001	4	Angus Reid	Offensive guard	Simon Fraser	
2002	4	Cory Annett	Offensive lineman	Eastern Michigan	
2003	-	No pick	-	-	Traded to Edmonton
2004	4	Mark Moroz	Offensive lineman	Wake Forest	
2004	7	Jean-Fredric Tremblay	Wide receiver	Laval	Pick acquired from Winnipeg
2005	9	Nick Kaczur	Offensive lineman	Toledo	
2006	5	Daniel Federkeil	Defensive lineman	Calgary	
2007	-	No pick	-	-	Traded to Calgary
2008	-	No pick	-	-	Traded to Saskatchewan
2009	2	Étienne Légaré	Defensive tackle	Laval	
2010	2	Joe Eppele	Offensive tackle	Washington State	
2010	3	Cory Greenwood	Linebacker	Concordia	Pick acquired from BC
2011	7	Tyler Holmes	Offensive lineman	Tulsa	
2012	-	No pick	-	-	Traded to Edmonton
2013	8	Matt Sewell	Offensive lineman	McMaster	
2014	3	Anthony Coombs	Running back	Manitoba	
2015	3	Sean McEwen	Offensive lineman	Calgary	
2016	4	Brian Jones	Wide receiver	Acadia	
2017	-	No pick	-	-	Traded to Winnipeg
2018	9	Ryan Hunter	Offensive lineman	Bowling Green	
2019	1	Shane Richards	Offensive lineman	Oklahoma State	
2020	2	Dejon Brissett	Wide receiver	Virginia	
2020	9	Theren Churchill	Offensive lineman	Regina	Pick acquired from Winnipeg
2021	7	Peter Nicastro	Offensive lineman	Calgary	
2022	6	Gregor MacKellar	Offensive lineman	St. Francis Xavier	
2023	-	No pick	-	-	Traded to BC
2024	5	Kevin Mital	Wide receiver	Laval	
2025	7	Jeremiah Ojo	Defensive lineman	Montreal	
2026	2	Niklas Henning	Offensive lineman	Queen's	
