= Enoch Penney-Laryea =

Canadian gridiron football player (born 1997)

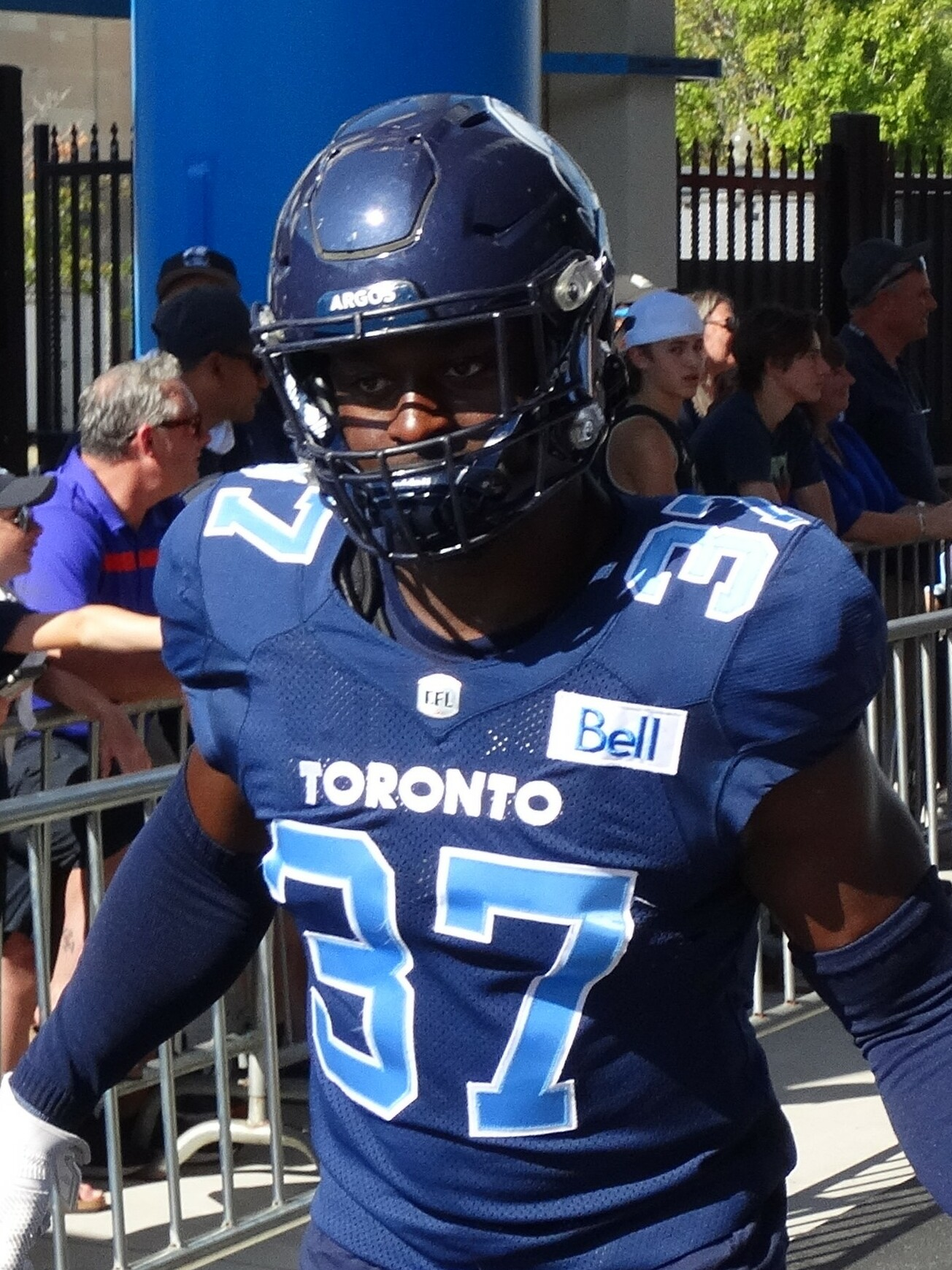
- Penney-Laryea with the Toronto Argonauts in 2022

No. 37, 41
- Position: Linebacker

Personal information
- Born: May 7, 1997 (age 29); Ghana
- Listed height: 5 ft 11 in (1.80 m)
- Listed weight: 217 lb (98 kg)

Career information
- High school: Tuckahoe (Eastchester, New York, U.S.)
- College: Union College
- University: McMaster
- CFL draft: 2022: 3rd round, 26th overall pick

Career history
- 2022: Toronto Argonauts
- 2023–2024: Hamilton Tiger-Cats

Awards and highlights
- Grey Cup champion (2022)
- Stats at CFL.ca

Enoch Penney-Laryea (born May 7, 1997) is a Ghanaian former professional Canadian football linebacker who played for the Toronto Argonauts and Hamilton Tiger-Cats of the Canadian Football League (CFL).

== Early life ==
Penney-Laryea was born in Ghana and moved with his family to Tuckahoe, New York, when his father transferred to the United Nations Department for Safety and Security in New York. His father had "previously been responsible for the security of UN personnel in Liberia, Rwanda, Lebanon and the Democratic Republic of the Congo." Penney-Laryea continued to live in Tuckahoe when his father was later transferred to South Sudan.

== College career ==
=== Union Dutchmen ===
Penney-Laryea first played college football as a running back for the Union Dutchmen from 2016 to 2017. He played in eight games where he had 17 carries for 90 yards. In 2017, he suffered a foot injury, which limited his final season at Union.

=== McMaster Marauders ===
After seeking other schools for transfer and discussing with a friend from Canada, Penney-Laryea decided to enroll at McMaster University for the Marauders football program and the school's academics. Due to the injury to his foot, he switched positions to linebacker and then to defensive lineman for the 2018 season and continued there for his three seasons with the Marauders. He did not play in 2020 due to the cancellation of the 2020 U Sports football season, but played in 12 games from 2018 to 2021 where he had 55 tackles, 15.5 tackles for a loss, 10.5 sacks, one interception, and two forced fumbles.

== Professional career ==
Pre-draft measurables
Height	Weight	40-yard dash	20-yard shuttle	Three-cone drill	Vertical jump	Broad jump	Bench press
5 ft 10 3/4 in (1.80 m)	217 lb (98 kg)	4.58 s	4.33 s	7.39 s	39.5 in (1.00 m)	10 ft 7 1/4 in (3.23 m)	27 reps
All values from CFL Combine

=== Toronto Argonauts ===
Following a conversation with McMaster's offensive coordinator, Corey Grant, Penney-Laryea was informed that he qualified as a National player in the Canadian Football League (CFL), despite being born in Ghana and growing up in the United States, due to eligibility changes implemented in 2021. The changes allow anyone who has played four years of U Sports football (and graduated) to enter the CFL as a national. He was then drafted in the third round, 26th overall, in the 2022 CFL draft by the Toronto Argonauts and signed with the team on May 10, 2022. Following training camp, he made the team's active roster and played in his first professional game on June 16, 2022, against the Montreal Alouettes. On July 24, 2022, his teammate, Robbie Smith, forced a fumble on a kickoff return, of which Penney-Laryea recovered and returned ten yards for his first career touchdown. He played in 15 regular season games where he had two special teams tackles. He did not play in any post-season games, but was a member of the 109th Grey Cup championship team.

At the conclusion of 2023 training camp, Penney-Laryea was part of the final cuts on June 2, 2023.

=== Hamilton Tiger-Cats ===
On August 1, 2023, it was announced that Penney-Laryea had signed with the Hamilton Tiger-Cats. He played in two games for the Tiger-Cats where he had two special teams tackles. He also made his post-season debut in the East Semi-Final where he had one special teams tackle in the loss to the Montreal Alouettes.

Penney-Laryea played in three of the Tiger-Cats' first four games of the season, but did not record a statistic. He was later released on July 3, 2024, after the team signed Deionte Knight.
