= Dakota Prukop =

American football player (born 1993)

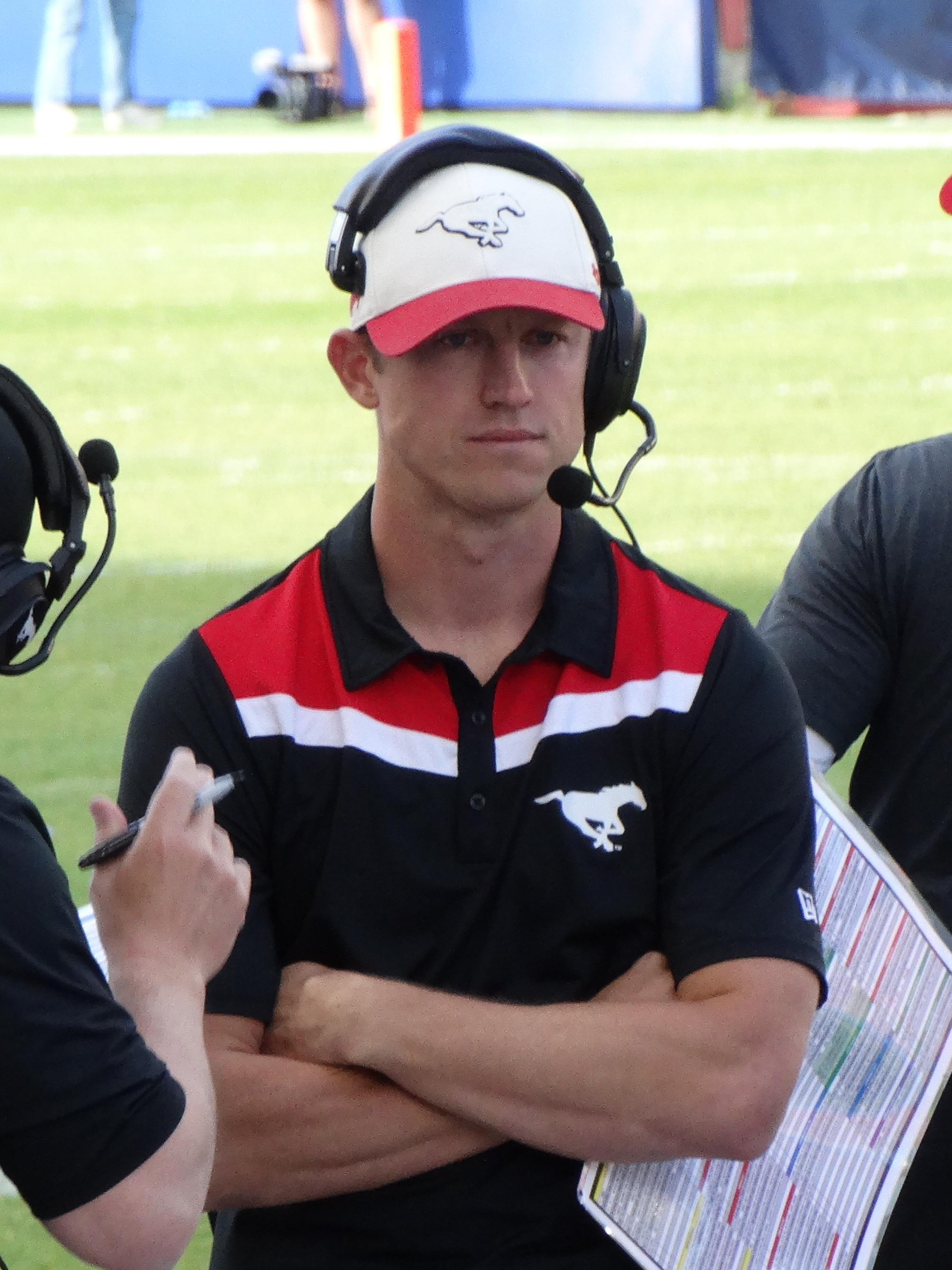
- Prukop with the Calgary Stampeders in 2025

No. 2, 9
- Position: Quarterback

Personal information
- Born: October 17, 1993 (age 33); Newport, California, U.S.
- Listed height: 6 ft 1 in (1.85 m)
- Listed weight: 212 lb (96 kg)

Career information
- High school: Vandegrift (Austin, Texas)
- College: Montana State (2012–2015); Oregon (2016)
- NFL draft: 2017: undrafted

Career history

Playing
- Toronto Argonauts (2017–2019); Calgary Stampeders (2020–2021)*; Edmonton Elks (2021); Winnipeg Blue Bombers (2022); New Jersey Generals (2023); Winnipeg Blue Bombers (2023); BC Lions (2024)*; Edmonton Elks (2024)
- * Offseason or practice squad member only

Coaching
- Calgary Stampeders (2025) Quarterbacks coach

Awards and highlights
- Grey Cup champion (2017); First-team FCS All-American (2015); Second-team All-Big Sky (2015); Third-team All-Big Sky (2014)

Career USFL statistics
- Passing completions: 31
- Passing attempts: 50
- Passing yards: 312
- TD–INT: 3–1
- Passer rating: 91.4

Career CFL statistics
- Games played: 99
- Passing completions: 47
- Passing attempts: 78
- Passing yards: 676
- TD–INT: 6–4
- Stats at CFL.ca

Dakota Prukop (born October 17, 1993) is an American former professional football quarterback and coach. He played college football for the Montana State Bobcats from 2013 to 2015 and for the Oregon Ducks in 2016. Prukop was a member of the Toronto Argonauts, Calgary Stampeders, Winnipeg Blue Bombers, New Jersey Generals, BC Lions, and Edmonton Elks.

== College career ==
Prukop transferred to the University of Oregon upon his graduation from Montana State University. Prukop announced his intentions to transfer to Oregon on December 15, 2015. On January 5, 2016, Prukop began classes at Oregon, officially joining the football team. After struggling in the Ducks' fifth game against Washington State, Prukop was benched and freshman quarterback Justin Herbert took over for the rest of the year.

=== Statistics ===
Year	Team	Games		Passing								Rushing			
Year	Team	GP	Record	Comp	Att	Pct	Yards	Avg	TD	Int	Rate	Att	Yards	Avg	TD
2013	Montana State	1	0–0	0	0	0.0	0	0.0	0	0	0.0	0	0	0.0	0
2014	Montana State	11	7–4	171	263	65.0	2,559	9.7	18	6	164.8	170	966	5.7	13
2015	Montana State	11	5–6	216	344	62.8	3,025	8.8	28	10	157.7	158	979	6.2	11
2016	Oregon	6	2–3	94	143	65.7	1,214	8.5	8	2	152.7	54	171	3.2	2
Career		29	14–13	481	750	64.8	6,798	8.9	54	18	156.8	332	1,934	4.3	26

== Professional career ==
=== Toronto Argonauts ===
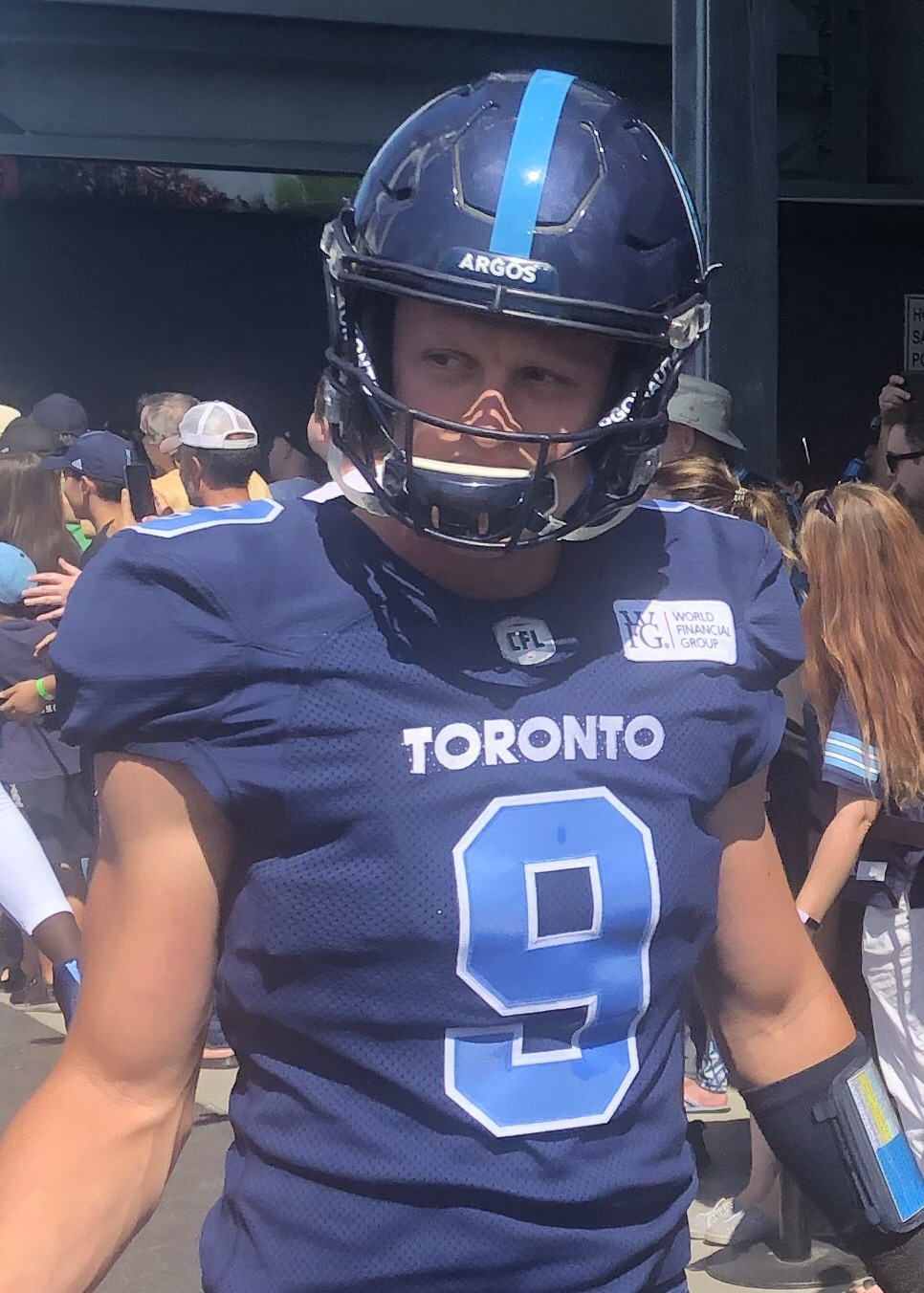
Prukop with the Toronto Argonauts in 2019

On May 23, 2017, Prukop signed with the Toronto Argonauts of the CFL. He played in nine games as the third-string quarterback, but also saw time on special teams, recording six special teams tackles for the year. While he didn't dress in any playoff games, he was a member of the 105th Grey Cup championship team in 2017. In 2018, he began the year as the fourth-string quarterback again, but was promoted to the active roster and regularly dressed as the third-string quarterback due to an injury to the team's starter, Ricky Ray. Following the Ray's retirement, Prukop became the team's third-string quarterback entering the 2019 Toronto Argonauts season, but was soon elevated to back up following an injury to starter, James Franklin. He saw his first action at quarterback on July 25, 2019, against the Edmonton Eskimos in relief of McLeod Bethel-Thompson, but he threw two interceptions and the team lost 26–0. Later that season, after the Argonauts had been eliminated from post-season contention, he again saw game action and threw his first career touchdown pass to Rodney Smith on a 13-yard completion on October 26, 2019, against the Ottawa Redblacks. As a pending free agent in 2020, he was released during the free agency negotiation window on February 7, 2020.

=== Calgary Stampeders ===
On February 11, 2020, Prukop signed with the Calgary Stampeders. He did not play in 2020 due to the cancellation of the 2020 CFL season and re-signed with the Stampeders on January 8, 2021. However, he was released near the end of training camp on July 29, 2021.

=== Edmonton Elks (first stint) ===
On July 30, 2021, it was announced that Prukop had signed with the Edmonton Elks. He played in eight regular season games where he completed 18 of 26 pass attempts for 183 yards with one touchdown and two interceptions. He was released on February 14, 2022.

=== Winnipeg Blue Bombers (first stint) ===
On February 15, 2022, it was announced that Prukop had signed with the Winnipeg Blue Bombers to a one-year contract. With the potential of an impending CBA lockout Prukop attended the Bombers' rookie training camp, contrary to the recommendation by the Players' Association who advised that veteran quarterbacks abstain from attending their teams' rookie camps. Prukop stated that he did not want to jeopardize his opportunity to make the roster as a veteran quarterback behind Zach Collaros. Primarily rostered as the 3rd string QB and short yardage pivot, he dressed for 12 regular season games where he completed seven of 14 pass attempts for 181 yards and two touchdowns. He was also featured heavily in the short yardage unit where he had 53 carries for 209 yards and six touchdowns. Prukop also played in the 109th Grey Cup game where he had five carries for nine yards and two touchdowns as the short yardage QB, but also had two pass attempts with no completions and one interception in the loss to the Toronto Argonauts. He became a free agent upon the expiry of his contract on February 14, 2023.

=== New Jersey Generals ===
On March 14, 2023, Prukop signed with the New Jersey Generals of the United States Football League (USFL). He was released on June 23, 2023.

=== Winnipeg Blue Bombers (second stint) ===
On June 27, 2023, it was announced that Prukop had signed with the Blue Bombers. He played in 15 games, primarily as the short-yardage quarterback, where he had 58 carries for 188 yards and seven touchdowns. He became a free agent upon the expiry of his contract on February 13, 2024.

=== BC Lions ===
On February 13, 2024, it was announced that Prukop had signed a one-year contract with the BC Lions. However, he was released shortly after the team's first preseason game on May 27, 2024.

=== Edmonton Elks (second stint) ===
Following his release by the BC Lions, Prukop signed with the Elks on June 2, 2024.

== Coaching career ==
On March 3, 2025, it was announced that Prukop had joined the Calgary Stampeders as the team's quarterbacks coach following the resignation of Beau Baldwin. He served in that capacity for one season and was not retained on the staff for 2026.
