= Theren Churchill =

Canadian gridiron football player (born 1994)

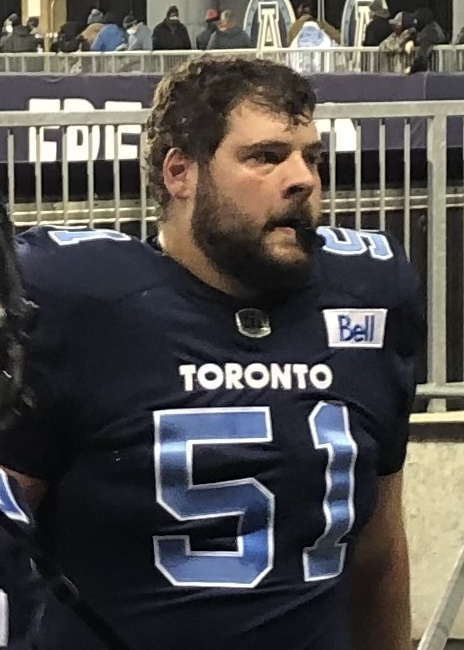
- Churchill with the Toronto Argonauts in 2021

No. 51
- Position: Offensive lineman

Personal information
- Born: October 12, 1994 (age 32); Stettler, Alberta, Canada
- Listed height: 6 ft 6 in (1.98 m)
- Listed weight: 295 lb (134 kg)

Career information
- High school: William E. Hay High
- CJFL: Edmonton Huskies
- University: Regina Rams
- CFL draft: 2020: 1st round, 9th overall pick

Career history
- 2021–2022: Toronto Argonauts
- 2023: Edmonton Elks

Awards and highlights
- Grey Cup champion (2022)
- Stats at CFL.ca

Theren Churchill (born October 12, 1994) is a Canadian former professional football offensive lineman who played for the Toronto Argonauts of the Canadian Football League (CFL).

== Amateur career ==
=== Edmonton Huskies ===
After finishing high school, Churchill played for the Edmonton Huskies of the Canadian Junior Football League for four years. He was named a Prairie Football Conference All-Star in 2016.

=== Regina Rams ===
Churchill joined the Regina Rams of U Sports football in 2017 and immediately became the team's starting right tackle. In his three seasons with the Rams, he started all 24 regular season games, and one post-season game in 2017, all at right tackle.

== Professional career ==
=== Toronto Argonauts ===
Churchill was drafted in the first round, ninth overall, in the 2020 CFL draft by the Toronto Argonauts, but did not play in 2020 due to the cancellation of the 2020 CFL season. He then signed with the team on March 22, 2021. Churchill began the 2021 season on the practice roster, but was promoted to the active roster in week 6 and made his professional debut on September 10, 2021, against the Hamilton Tiger-Cats. He dressed in the remaining ten games of the regular season and made his first start in the last game of the regular season against the Edmonton Elks on November 16, 2021. He dressed in 11 regular season games in 2022, but was inactive for the team's 109th Grey Cup championship victory.

=== Edmonton Elks ===
On May 14, 2023, Churchill was traded to the Edmonton Elks in exchange for a sixth-round pick in the 2024 CFL draft. He began the season on the injured list before moving to the practice roster on July 5, 2023. He was released from the practice roster prior to the last game of the season on October 20, 2023.

== Personal life ==
Churchill first played ice hockey when he was five or six years old and then started playing gridiron football when he was nine or ten years old.
