= Jeremiah Ojo =

Canadian gridiron football player (born 2000)

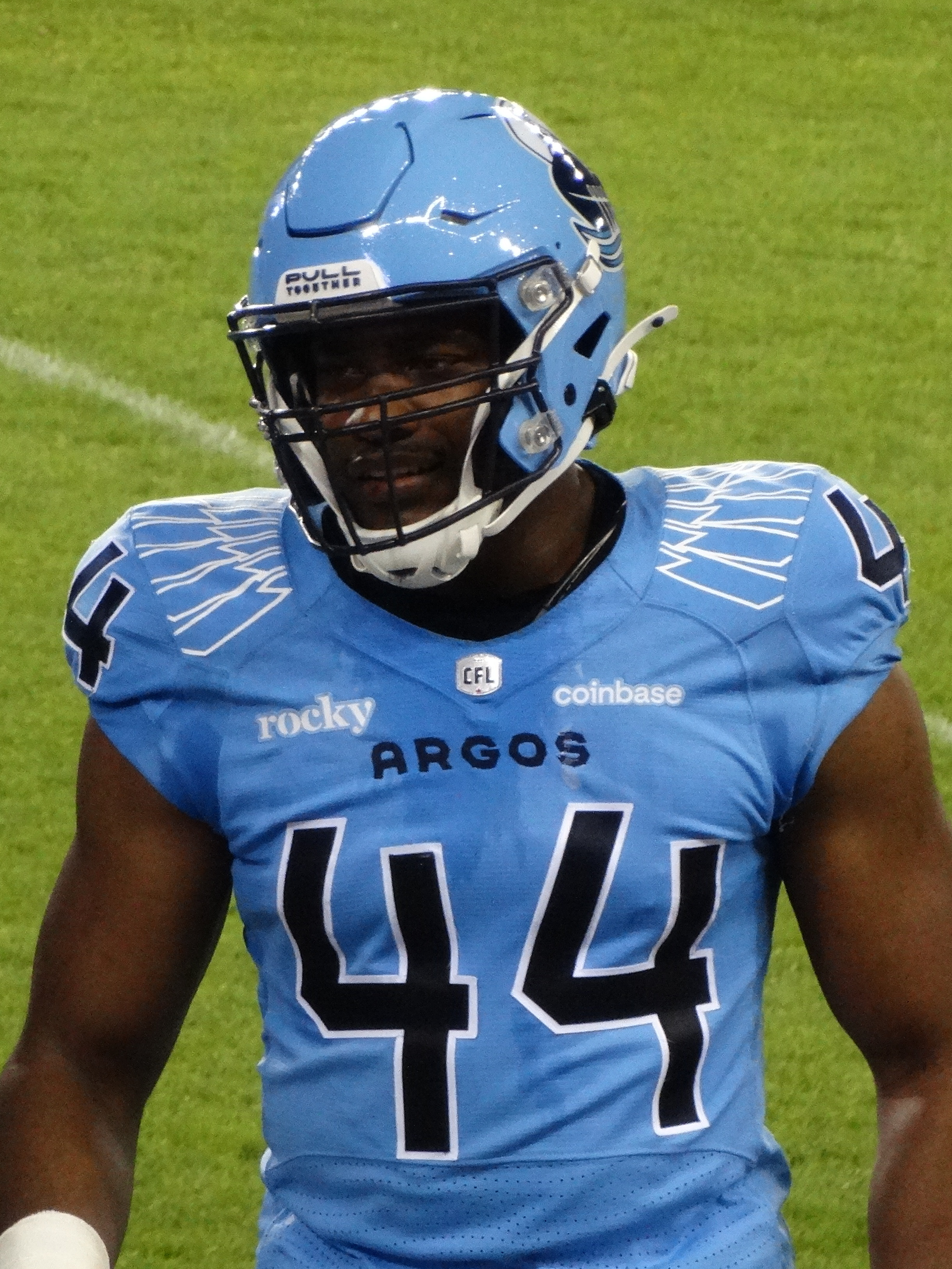
- Ojo with the Toronto Argonauts in 2025

No. 44 – Toronto Argonauts
- Position: Defensive lineman
- Roster status: Active
- CFL status: National

Personal information
- Born: December 11, 2000 (age 25); Montreal, Quebec, Canada
- Listed height: 6 ft 2 in (1.88 m)
- Listed weight: 246 lb (112 kg)

Career information
- CEGEP: John Abbott College
- University: Montreal
- CFL draft: 2025: 1st round, 7th overall pick

Career history
- 2025–present: Toronto Argonauts

Awards and highlights
- Vanier Cup champion (2023); First-team All-Canadian (2023, 2024)
- Stats at CFL.ca

Jeremiah Ojo (born December 11, 2000) is a Canadian professional football defensive lineman for the Toronto Argonauts of the Canadian Football League (CFL). He is a Vanier Cup champion after winning with the Montreal Carabins in 2023.

== University career ==
Ojo played U Sports football for the Montreal Carabins from 2021 to 2024. He played in 24 games where he had 54 tackles, including 15 tackles for a loss, 14.5 sacks, five forced fumbles, and one interception. He was named a U Sports First Team All-Canadian in 2023 and 2024 and was named the RSEQ Lineman of the Year in 2024. Ojo also played in the 2023 Vanier Cup where he recorded three assisted tackles and half a sack in the Carabins' victory over the UBC Thunderbirds.

== Professional career ==
Pre-draft measurables
Height	Weight	40-yard dash	20-yard shuttle	Three-cone drill	Vertical jump	Broad jump	Bench press
6 ft 1 7/8 in (1.88 m)	246 lb (112 kg)	4.59 s	4.27 s	7.14 s	35.0 in (0.89 m)	9 ft 8 1/8 in (2.95 m)	25 reps
All values from CFL Combine

In the final Canadian Football League's Amateur Scouting Bureau rankings for players eligible for the 2025 CFL draft, Ojo was listed as the 16th-best player available. He was then drafted in the first round, seventh overall, in the 2025 CFL draft by the Toronto Argonauts and signed with the team on May 11, 2025. Following training camp in 2025, he made the team's active roster and made his professional debut in his hometown of Montreal against the Alouettes on June 6, 2025.
