= Archbishop Coleman F. Carroll High School =

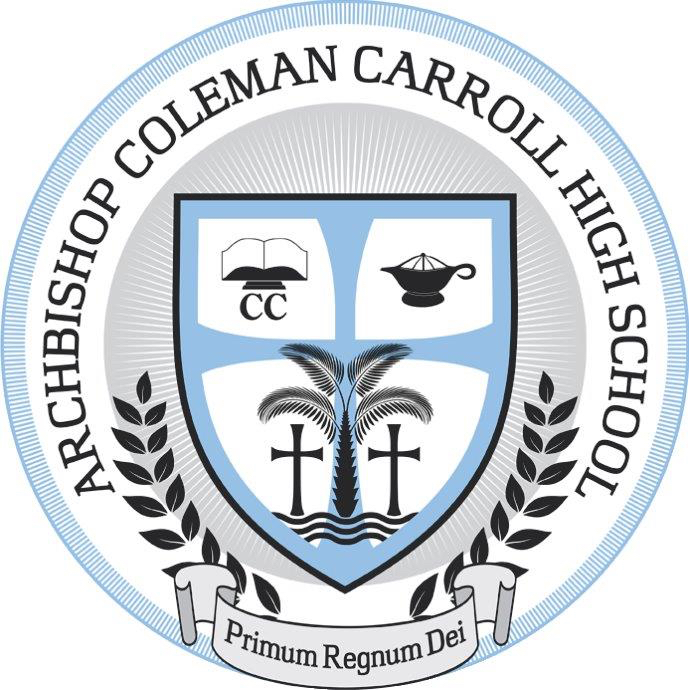

Location
- 10300 SW 167 Avenue; The Hammocks, Florida 33196; United States; 25°40′16″N 80°28′01″W

Information
- Type: Private
- Motto: Primum Regnum Dei
- Religious affiliation: Roman Catholic
- Established: 1998
- Authority: Roman Catholic Archdiocese of Miami
- Principal: Sister Margaret Ann OCD
- Faculty: 30.4 (on an FTE basis)
- Grades: 9–12
- Enrollment: 602 (2025–26)
- Student to teacher ratio: 17:1
- Campus size: 40 acres
- Colors: Baby Blue, Black and Silver
- Mascot: Bulldog
- Nickname: ACC or Carroll
- Accreditation: AdvancED
- Website: www.colemancarroll.org

Archbishop Coleman F. Carroll High School is a private high school in The Hammocks, Dade County, Florida, United States, that was opened in 1998. Sponsored by the Roman Catholic Archdiocese of Miami, it is accredited through the Southern Association of Colleges and Schools. Named after the first Archbishop of Miami, Coleman Francis Carroll, the school's mascot is the Bulldog.

Monsignor Gerard Thomas La Cerra was the first supervising principal of Archbishop Coleman F. Carroll High School.

Students wear a uniform consisting of a solid black or light blue shirt with a Carroll logo, black ACHS khaki slacks, a black leather belt, black shoes, and a student ID with ACHS lanyard. As of the 2025–2026 school year, there are 602 students enrolled in grades nine through twelve.

== Academics ==
- AP Courses:
  - AP Calculus I AB
  - AP Calculus II BC
  - AP English Language and Composition
  - AP English Literature and Composition
  - AP Psychology
  - AP Studio Art
  - AP World History
  - AP United States History
  - AP European History
  - AP Human Geography
- The Dual Enrollment Program is an accelerated program that allows eligible students to take postsecondary coursework and simultaneously earn high school and college credits prior to high school graduation. ACHS has two programs:
  - Dual Enrollment Courses through Miami-Dade College and
  - Dual Enrollment Courses through St. Thomas University.

== Athletics ==
Sponsored sports activities at the school include:

- Baseball
- Basketball (Men's)
- Basketball (Women's)
- Cheerleading
- Dance
- Football (Men’s)
- Flag Football (Woman’s)
- Soccer (Men's)
- Soccer (Women's)
- Softball
- Volleyball (Men's)
- Volleyball (Women's)

== Notable alumni ==
- Aimee Carrero, actress
- Rodney Smith, wide receiver for the Toronto Argonauts
- Amida Brimah professional basketball player.
