= Caleb Holden =

American gridiron football player (born 1998)

No. 26
- Position: Defensive back

Personal information
- Born: June 30, 1998 (age 28)
- Listed height: 5 ft 9 in (1.75 m)
- Listed weight: 190 lb (86 kg)

Career information
- High school: Union (Union, New Jersey)
- College: Merrimack (2017–2021)
- NFL draft: 2022: undrafted

Career history
- Toronto Argonauts (2022–2023)

Awards and highlights
- Grey Cup champion (2022); First-team All-NEC (2021); Third-team All-NE10 (2018)

Career CFL statistics
- Games played: 8
- Tackles: 10
- Pass deflections: 1
- Stats at CFL.ca

Caleb Holden (born June 30, 1998) is an American former professional football defensive back who played for the Toronto Argonauts of the Canadian Football League (CFL). He played college football for the Merrimack Warriors.

== Early life ==
Holden was born on June 30, 1998, and attended Union High School in Union, New Jersey.

== College career ==
Holden played college football for the Merrimack Warriors from 2017 to 2021. In 45 games, he had 106 tackles, including four for loss, one sack, nine interceptions, 43 pass break ups, one forced fumble and fumble recovery. Holden was a third-team All-Northeast-10 Conference recipient in 2018 and first-team All-Northeast Conference in 2021.

== Professional career ==
Pre-draft measurables
| Height | Weight | Arm length | Hand span | Wingspan | 40-yard dash | 10-yard split | 20-yard split | 20-yard shuttle | Three-cone drill | Vertical jump | Broad jump | Bench press |
|---|---|---|---|---|---|---|---|---|---|---|---|---|
| 5 ft 8 in (1.73 m) | 181 lb (82 kg) | 29 7/8 in (0.76 m) | 8 3/4 in (0.22 m) | 5 ft 11 3/4 in (1.82 m) | 4.56 s | 1.55 s | 2.63 s | 4.01 s | 7.05 s | 39.5 in (1.00 m) | 10 ft 8 in (3.25 m) | 16 reps |
All values from Pro day

After not being selected in the 2022 NFL draft, Holden signed with the Toronto Argonauts of the Canadian Football League (CFL) as an undrafted free agent. He played in eight games, recording ten tackles and one pass defended. Holden finished the season on the practice roster as the Argonauts won the 109th Grey Cup. On December 6, he re-signed with the team. On June 3, 2023, Holden was released.
