= Markeith Ambles =

American gridiron football player (born 1991)

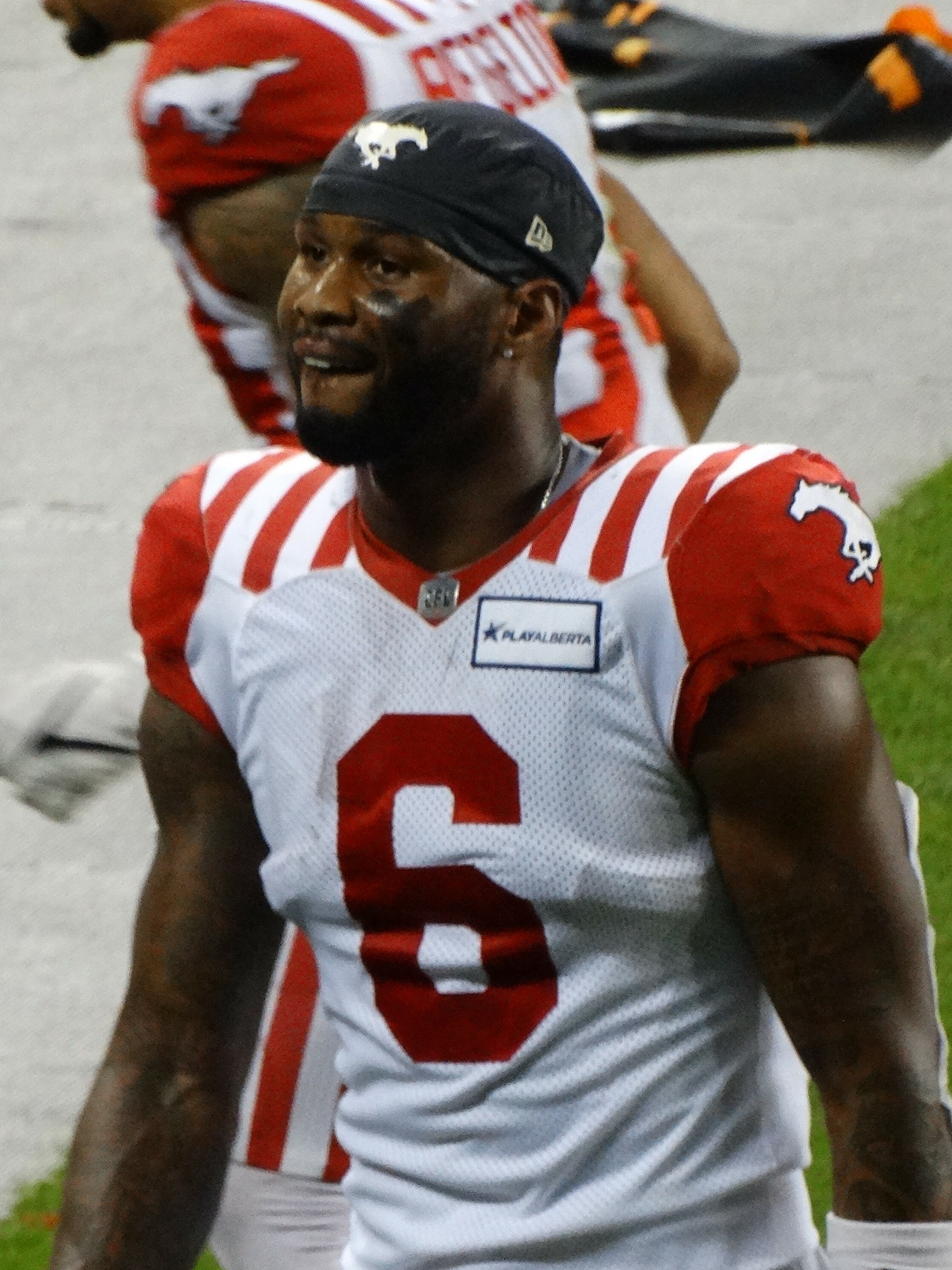
- Ambles with the Calgary Stampeders in 2023

Profile
- Position: Wide receiver

Personal information
- Born: November 26, 1991 (age 34); McDonough, Georgia, U.S.
- Listed height: 6 ft 2 in (1.88 m)
- Listed weight: 201 lb (91 kg)

Career information
- High school: Henry County (McDonough, Georgia)
- College: USC (2010–2011); Arizona Western (2012); Houston (2013–2014)
- NFL draft: 2015: undrafted

Career history
- Toronto Argonauts (2016)*; Calgary Stampeders (2018–2021); Toronto Argonauts (2022–2023); Calgary Stampeders (2023); Winnipeg Blue Bombers (2023)*
- * Offseason or practice squad member only

Awards and highlights
- 2× Grey Cup champion (2018, 2022)

Career CFL statistics
- Games played: 50
- Receptions: 204
- Receiving yards: 2,329
- Receiving touchdowns: 12
- Stats at CFL.ca

Markeith Ambles (born November 26, 1991) is an American professional football wide receiver. He played college football at Houston.

== College career ==
Ambles began his college career at USC in 2010. He was suspended in October 2010 due to late arrivals to team functions. After being dismissed from the team in November, he rejoined the team in January 2011. Ambles withdrew from USC in August 2011 after being declared academically ineligible. After spending the 2012 season with Arizona Western College, he transferred to Houston in April 2013. Ambles played for Houston in 2013 and 2014.

== Professional career ==
=== Toronto Argonauts (first stint) ===
In May 2016, Ambles signed with the Toronto Argonauts. He was released by the club as part of the team's final cuts before the start of the season.

=== Calgary Stampeders (first stint) ===
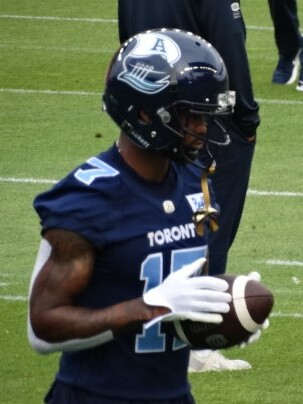
Ambles with the Toronto Argonauts in 2022

Ambles signed with the Calgary Stampeders on March 15, 2018. He was promoted to the active roster in September 2018. Ambles caught 28 passes for 306 yards with four touchdowns in eight games in the 2018 season before being injured just before the 106th Grey Cup which the Stamps went on to win. In his second season with the Stampeders Ambles caught 35 passes for 407 yards in nine games. He suffered an ankle injury in late September 2019 which caused him to miss the remainder of the season. He re-signed with the Stampeders on December 30, 2020. However, the 2020 CFL season was cancelled and he did not play that year. In 2021, he played in all 14 regular season games where he had 54 receptions for 686 yards and three touchdowns. He became a free agent upon the expiry of his contract on February 8, 2022.

=== Toronto Argonauts (second stint) ===
On February 10, 2022, it was announced that Ambles had signed with the Argonauts. He continued his strong play in Toronto, setting new personal bests for games played (18), receptions (72), yards (737), and touchdowns (5). He won the 109th Grey Cup to conclude the 2022 season. On February 21, 2023, one week after becoming a free agent, Ambles and the Argos agreed on a new contract. However, he was injured during training camp and, once he became healthy, was released on August 2, 2023.

=== Calgary Stampeders (second stint) ===
On August 5, 2023, it was announced that Ambles had signed a practice roster agreement with the Stampeders. He played in four games where he recorded 15 receptions for 193 yards, before being released on September 22, 2023.

=== Winnipeg Blue Bombers ===
On October 31, 2023, Ambles signed a practice roster agreement with the Winnipeg Blue Bombers. He was released on November 20, 2023.
