= Rodney Smith (wide receiver) =

American gridiron football player (born 1990)

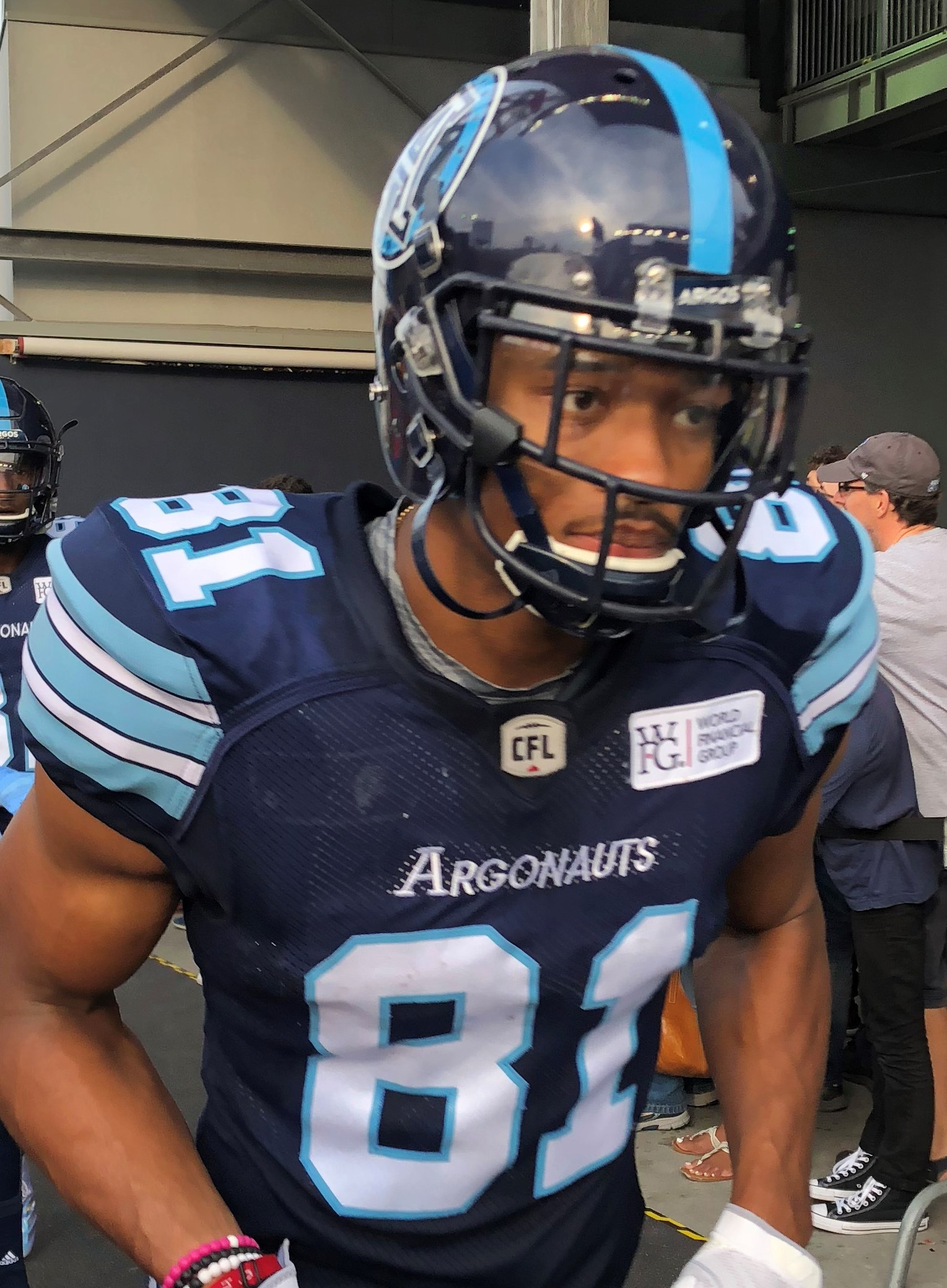
- Smith with the Toronto Argonauts in 2018

No. 83, 13
- Position: Wide receiver

Personal information
- Born: March 11, 1990 (age 36); Miami, Florida, U.S.
- Listed height: 6 ft 4 in (1.93 m)
- Listed weight: 235 lb (107 kg)

Career information
- High school: Archbishop Carroll (Miami)
- College: Florida State
- NFL draft: 2013: undrafted

Career history
- Minnesota Vikings (2013–2014); Cleveland Browns (2014); Dallas Cowboys (2015); Seattle Seahawks (2016–2017)*; Toronto Argonauts (2018–2019); Edmonton Eskimos / Elks (2020–2021)*; Toronto Argonauts (2021)
- * Offseason or practice squad member only

Career CFL statistics
- Games played: 23
- Receptions: 74
- Receiving yards: 903
- Receiving average: 12.2
- Receiving touchdowns: 5
- Stats at CFL.ca
- Stats at Pro Football Reference

Rodney DeAngelo Smith (born March 11, 1990) is an American former professional football wide receiver. He played college football at Florida State and signed with the Minnesota Vikings as an undrafted free agent in 2013.

== Early life ==
Smith attended Archbishop Carroll High School in Miami, Florida, where he was a two-sport athlete in football and track. He earned the Miami Herald All-Dade honors at wide receiver. In his final two seasons at Archbishop Carroll High School in which he finished with a total of 65 receptions, 1,330 receiving yards and 17 receiving touchdowns. He was also on the track & field team, where he posted times of 23.00 seconds in the 200-meter dash and 51.98 in the 400-meter dash. He was a four-star prospect out of high school in which he was ranked among the top 100 prospects nationally.

=== Recruiting ===
College recruiting
| Name | Hometown | School | Height | Weight | 40^{‡} | Commit date |
|---|---|---|---|---|---|---|
| Rodney Smith; Wide receiver | Miami, Florida | Archbishop Carroll High School | 6 ft 6 in (1.98 m) | 202 lb (92 kg) | 4.7 | Jul 26, 2008 |
| Rodney Smith; Wide receiver | Recruit ratings: Scout: Rivals: | | | | | |
Overall recruit ranking: Scout: 35 (WR) Rivals: 8 (WR), 65 (National), 13 (Florida)
‡ Refers to 40-yard dash; Note: In many cases, Scout, Rivals, 247Sports, On3, and ESPN may conflict in their listings of height, weight and 40 time.; In these cases, the average was taken. ESPN grades are on a 100-point scale.; Sources: "2009 Florida State Football Commitments". Rivals.; "2009 Florida State Football Recruiting Commits". Scout.; "Scout.com Team Recruiting Rankings". Scout.; "2009 Team Ranking". Rivals.com.

== College career ==
He played his college football at Florida State. During his junior season, he was selected as the top conditioned athlete at the Florida State's annual banquet. He finished college with a total of 106 receptions, 1,540 receiving yards along with 10 touchdowns. During his senior season on October 13, 2012, in a regular season game against Boston College in which he had a season high 9 receptions and 108 receiving yards. He participated in the 2013 East-West Shrine Game on the East team.

== Professional career ==
Pre-draft measurables
| Height | Weight | Arm length | Hand span | Wingspan | 40-yard dash | 10-yard split | 20-yard split | 20-yard shuttle | Three-cone drill | Vertical jump | Broad jump |
|---|---|---|---|---|---|---|---|---|---|---|---|
| 6 ft 4 3/8 in (1.94 m) | 225 lb (102 kg) | 34 3/4 in (0.88 m) | 10 3/8 in (0.26 m) | 7 ft 0 in (2.13 m) | 4.51 s | 1.60 s | 2.66 s | 4.07 s | 7.03 s | 34.5 in (0.88 m) | 10 ft 0 in (3.05 m) |
All values from NFL Combine

=== Minnesota Vikings ===
After not being drafted in the 2013 NFL draft Smith signed with the Minnesota Vikings the night that the draft had ended. Smith was released by the Vikings on August 31, 2013 (along with 18 others) to get to a 53-man roster and signed to the practice squad the next day. He was released on October 2, 2014.

=== Cleveland Browns ===
He was claimed on waivers by the Cleveland Browns on October 3, 2014. He was released to make room on the roster for linebacker Moise Fokou on August 10, 2015.

=== Dallas Cowboys ===
On September 8, 2015, Smith was signed to the Dallas Cowboys' practice squad. He was promoted to the active roster on December 30, 2015.

On August 30, 2016, Smith was waived by the Cowboys.

=== Seattle Seahawks ===
On September 5, 2016, Smith was signed to the Seattle Seahawks' practice squad. On September 13, 2016, he was released by the Seahawks. He signed a reserve/future contract with the Seahawks on January 19, 2017. On August 3, 2017, Smith was waived by the Seahawks. He was re-signed on August 12, 2017. He was waived on September 2, 2017.

=== Toronto Argonauts (first stint) ===
Smith signed with the Toronto Argonauts in March 2018. Smith's first year with the Argos concluded with 9 games played, catching 23 passes for 257 yards. In 2019, Smith's playing time increased as he replaced Llevi Noel on offense, and developed chemistry with McLeod Bethel-Thompson by racking up 51 catches for 646 yards and 5 touchdowns. Although the team limped to a 4-14 finish, 4 out of Smith's 5 touchdowns came in Argos victories, and he passed 100 yards receiving on two occasions. Smith caught the first touchdown pass thrown by Dakota Prukop, and later in the same game Smith also caught the first career touchdown pass by Canadian pivot Michael O'Connor; in his excitement, Smith threw the ball into the stands. A fan was able to return the memento to the sidelines.

=== Edmonton Eskimos / Elks ===
Smith signed with the Edmonton Eskimos on March 13, 2020. He re-signed with Edmonton on a contract extension through 2021 on December 26, 2020. He was released on July 19, 2021.

=== Toronto Argonauts (second stint) ===
On July 22, 2021, it was announced that Smith had signed with the Argonauts. He was released on July 30, 2021.
