= Stu Kennedy (Canadian football) =

Canadian football player (1931–2021)

- Kennedy at Carleton University, 1950

No. 52
- Positions: Center, guard

Personal information
- Born: May 17, 1931
- Died: November 8, 2021 (aged 90)
- Listed height: 6 ft 1 in (1.85 m)
- Listed weight: 215 lb (98 kg)

Career information
- High school: St. Patrick's (ON)
- University: Carleton; Queen's
- CFL draft: 1953: 2nd round, 6th overall pick

Career history
- 1953–1954: Ottawa Rough Riders

James Stuart Kennedy (May 17, 1931 – November 8, 2021) was a Canadian professional football center and guard who played two seasons in the Interprovincial Rugby Football Union (IRFU) (now Canadian Football League (CFL) East Division) for the Ottawa Rough Riders. He played college football for Carleton and Queen's University and was the sixth overall draft pick in the 1953 IRFU college draft.

After playing briefly for Carleton and from 1951–1952 on the Queen's University varsity team, Kennedy was selected with the sixth overall pick in the 1953 IRFU college draft by the Ottawa Rough Riders. He played two seasons with Ottawa, appearing in a total of twenty games.

He died on November 8, 2021, at the age of 90.
