= 1953 IRFU college draft =

First sports draft by the Interprovincial Rugby Football Union

The 1953 IRFU college draft was the first official sports draft held by the Interprovincial Rugby Football Union, a predecessor of the East Division of the Canadian Football League, in the spring of 1953. 40 players were chosen from among eligible players from five eastern universities, McGill University, Queen's University, University of Toronto, University of Western Ontario, and McMaster University. The Montreal Alouettes had the first selection, Doug McNichol, who became the first player to be drafted to a Canadian professional football team.

The following list only includes the first three rounds due to historical limitations.

== Round one ==
| Pick # | CFL team | Player | Position | University |
|---|---|---|---|---|
| 1 | Montreal Alouettes | Doug McNichol | E | Western Ontario |
| 2 | Ottawa Rough Riders | Joe Harris | T | Toronto |
| 3 | Toronto Argonauts | Geoff Crain | QB | McGill |
| 4 | Hamilton Tiger-Cats | Ray Truant | HB | Western Ontario |

== Round two ==
| Pick # | CFL team | Player | Position | University |
|---|---|---|---|---|
| 5 | Montreal Alouettes | Bill Bewley | HB | Toronto |
| 6 | Ottawa Rough Riders | Stu Kennedy | T | Queen's |
| 7 | Toronto Argonauts | Lee Munn | T | McMaster |
| 8 | Hamilton Tiger-Cats | Dunc Ellis | T | Toronto |

== Round three ==
| Pick # | CFL team | Player | Position | University |
|---|---|---|---|---|
| 9 | Montreal Alouettes | Jim Miller | E | McGill |
| 10 | Ottawa Rough Riders | Tony Arnoldi | E | Queen's |
| 11 | Toronto Argonauts | Don Griffin | HB | Queen's |
| 12 | Hamilton Tiger-Cats | L. Wrigglesworth | HB | McMaster |
