= Gregor MacKellar =

Canadian gridiron football player (born 1998)

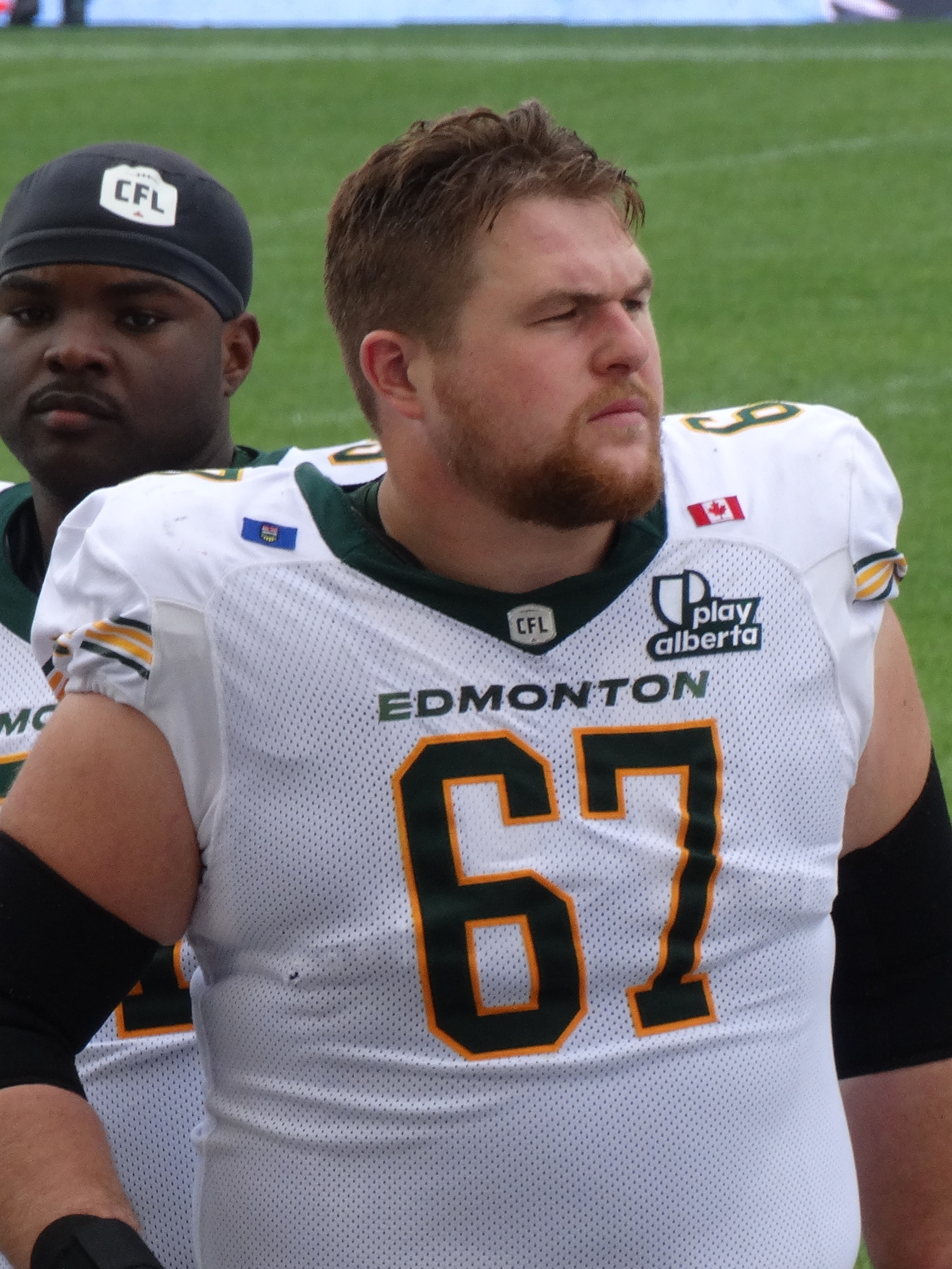
- MacKellar with the Edmonton Elks in 2025

Profile
- Position: Offensive lineman

Personal information
- Born: July 22, 1998 (age 28); Timberlea, Nova Scotia, Canada
- Listed height: 6 ft 4 in (1.93 m)
- Listed weight: 311 lb (141 kg)

Career information
- High school: St. Andrew's College; Bay View High
- College: Rice
- University: St. Francis Xavier
- CFL draft: 2022: 1st round, 6th overall pick

Career history
- 2022–2024: Toronto Argonauts
- 2025: Edmonton Elks
- 2026: Ottawa Redblacks*
- * Offseason or practice squad member only

Awards and highlights
- 2× Grey Cup champion (2022, 2024); Loney Bowl champion (2018, 2021); Second-team All-Canadian (2021)
- Stats at CFL.ca

Gregor Bruce MacKellar (born July 22, 1998) is a Canadian former professional football offensive lineman who played in the Canadian Football League (CFL). He is a two-time Grey Cup champion after winning with the Toronto Argonauts in 2022 and 2024.

== University career ==
MacKellar first attended Rice University in 2017 and had a redshirt season while a member of the Rice Owls. Following a coaching change, MacKellar sought a transfer and moved back to Nova Scotia to become a member of the St. Francis Xavier X-Men in time for the 2018 season. In his first season, the X-Men were Loney Bowl champions after defeating the Saint Mary's Huskies. He did not play in 2020 due to the cancellation of the 2020 U Sports football season. In his fourth and final year, in 2021, he was named a U Sports Second Team All-Canadian and again won the Loney Bowl in a victory over the Bishop's Gaiters.

== Professional career ==
Pre-draft measurables
Height	Weight	40-yard dash	20-yard shuttle	Three-cone drill	Vertical jump	Broad jump	Bench press
6 ft 3 1/4 in (1.91 m)	322 lb (146 kg)	5.54 s	5.03 s	8.19 s	27.0 in (0.69 m)	8 ft 1 in (2.46 m)	24 reps
All values from CFL Combine

=== Toronto Argonauts ===
MacKellar was ranked as the 19th best player in the Canadian Football League's Amateur Scouting Bureau final rankings for players eligible in the 2022 CFL draft. He was then drafted in the first round, sixth overall, in the draft by the Toronto Argonauts. He then signed with the team on May 10, 2022. Following training camp, he was placed on the injured list, but soon after played in his first career professional game on July 4, 2022, against the Winnipeg Blue Bombers. His first game played outside of Toronto's BMO Field was in Wolfville, Nova Scotia as part of Touchdown Atlantic where he dressed as a backup offensive lineman in his home province. He played in 16 regular season games in 2022 and started in 12 of them.

In the 2023 season, MacKellar played in all 18 regular season games, starting in one. He also dressed in the team's East Final loss to the Montreal Alouettes. In the 2024 season, MacKellar began the season as an opening day starter, but was moved to the injured list after eight games. He returned as a starter in the team's meaningless final game of the regular season, but was relegated to backup duty for the team's postseason. He dressed in all three post-season games, including the 111th Grey Cup where the Argonauts defeated the Winnipeg Blue Bombers 41–24. As an impending free agent, MacKellar was granted an early release on February 10, 2025.

=== Edmonton Elks ===
MacKellar joined the Edmonton Elks through free agency on February 11, 2025. He dressed in all 18 games and made 13 starts at right guard. He became a free agent upon the expiry of his contract on February 10, 2026.

=== Ottawa Redblacks ===
On February 17, 2026, it was announced that MacKellar had signed with the Ottawa Redblacks. He retired on May 12, 2026.

== Personal life ==
MacKellar was born to parents Bruce and Kelly MacKellar. He has one sister, Ainsley, who also attended St. Francis Xavier University. MacKellar plays bagpipes and competed in 2013 World Pipe Band Championships in Glasgow, Scotland.
