= Jim Miller (end) =

Canadian football player & rugby union player

No. 72
- Position: End

Personal information
- Born: February 20, 1932; Montreal, Quebec, Canada
- Died: November 1, 2006 (aged 74)
- Listed height: 5 ft 11 in (1.80 m)
- Listed weight: 225 lb (102 kg)

Career information
- College: McGill (1949–1953)
- CFL draft: 1953: 3rd round, 9th overall pick

Career history
- 1953–1958: Montreal Alouettes

Awards and highlights
- IRFU All-Star (1956)

James Bernard Miller (February 20, 1932 – November 1, 2006) was a Canadian professional football end who played six seasons with the Montreal Alouettes of the Interprovincial Rugby Football Union. He was drafted by the Montreal Alouettes in the third round of the 1953 IRFU college draft. He played college football at McGill University.

== College career ==
Miller played college football for the McGill Redmen from 1949 to 1953, including three seasons on the senior squad. He was an All-Star in 1952. He also won three consecutive Canadian intercollegiate boxing heavyweight championships from 1951 to 1953. Miller represented McGill at the 1952 Canadian boxing championships and Olympic trials in Vancouver. He was the 1953 Quebec Golden Gloves heavyweight champion. He studied commerce at McGill University. Miller was inducted into the McGill Sports Hall of Fame on September 26, 2002.

== Professional career ==
Miller was selected by the Montreal Alouettes with the ninth pick in the 1953 IRFU Draft and played for the team from 1953 to 1958. He earned IRFU All-Star honors at defensive end in 1956. The Alouettes lost the Grey Cup three straight years from 1954 to 1956.

== Personal life ==
Miller managed an appliance company called Danby Corporation upon leaving McGill. He sold the company in 1972 and starting managing Miller Properties, a real estate business with properties in Quebec and the United States, in 1982. He was inducted into the YMHA Hall of Fame in October 2001.
