= Deionte Knight =

Canadian gridiron football player (born 1999)

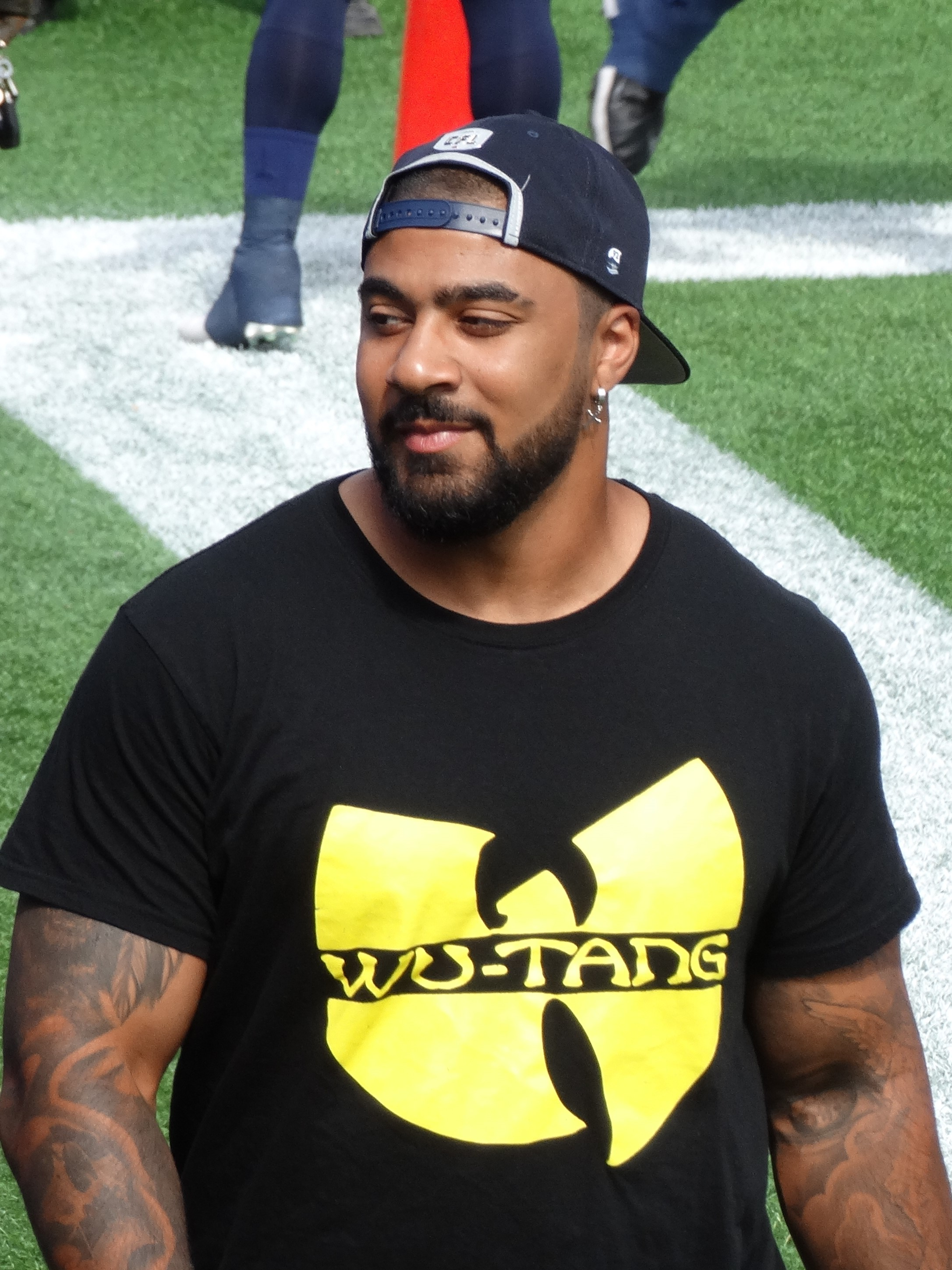
- Knight in 2022

Profile
- Position: Defensive lineman

Personal information
- Born: April 7, 1999 (age 27); Ajax, Ontario, Canada
- Listed height: 6 ft 3 in (1.91 m)
- Listed weight: 278 lb (126 kg)

Career information
- University: Western
- CFL draft: 2022: 2nd round, 10th overall pick

Career history
- 2022–2024: Toronto Argonauts
- 2024: Hamilton Tiger-Cats
- 2025: Ottawa Redblacks

Awards and highlights
- Grey Cup champion (2022); Vanier Cup champion (2021); J. P. Metras Trophy (2021)
- Stats at CFL.ca

Deionte Knight (born April 7, 1999) is a Canadian professional football defensive lineman. He most recently played for the Ottawa Redblacks of the Canadian Football League (CFL).

== University career ==
Knight played for the Western Mustangs of U Sports football from 2018 to 2021. He did not play in 2020 due to the cancellation of the 2020 season, but managed to record 96 tackles and 13.5 sacks in three seasons. In his final year, in 2021, he recorded 52 tackles, including 13 for a loss, ten sacks, and two forced fumbles as he won the J. P. Metras Trophy that year. To end the year, Knight won a Vanier Cup championship after the Mustangs defeated the Saskatchewan Huskies in the 56th Vanier Cup where Knight recorded three tackles and one sack.

== Professional career ==
Pre-draft measurables
Height	Weight	40-yard dash	20-yard shuttle	Three-cone drill	Vertical jump	Broad jump	Bench press
6 ft 3 in (1.91 m)	278 lb (126 kg)	5.07 s	4.69 s	7.50 s	32.0 in (0.81 m)	9 ft 4 1/8 in (2.85 m)	10 reps
All values from CFL Combine

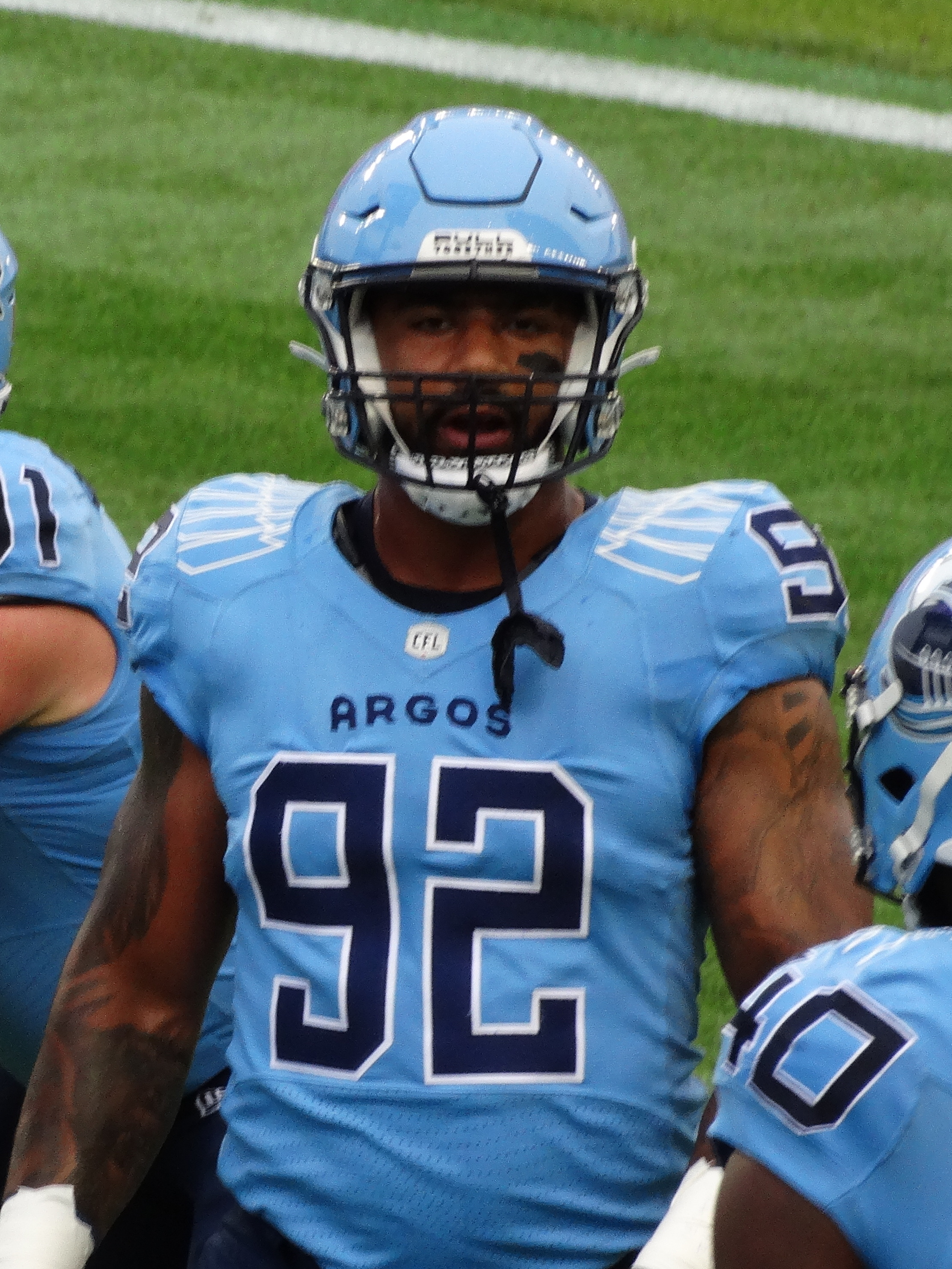
Knight with the Toronto Argonauts in 2024

=== Toronto Argonauts ===
Knight was drafted in the second round, 10th overall, in the 2022 CFL draft by the Toronto Argonauts and signed with the team on May 20, 2022. He began the 2022 season on the injured list but made his professional debut on August 20, 2022, against the Calgary Stampeders. He returned to the injured list shortly after, but returned near the end of the season, including making his first career start on October 29, 2022, against the Montreal Alouettes. In total, Knight played in four regular season games where he recorded two defensive tackles. He was on the injured list during the post-season, including when the Argonauts won the 109th Grey Cup championship.

Knight made the team's active roster following training camp in 2023 and had three defensive tackles as a back-up in the season-opening game. He played in 17 regular season games where he had 17 defensive tackles, two sacks, and one forced fumble.

To begin the 2024 season, Knight was a healthy scratch on the one-game injured list, but dressed for the team's next two games without recording a statistic. He was then moved to the practice roster on July 1, 2024.

=== Hamilton Tiger-Cats ===
On July 3, 2024, Knight was claimed off of the Argonauts' practice roster by the Hamilton Tiger-Cats. He dressed in 12 regular season games as a backup where he recorded four defensive tackles. He was transferred to the practice roster for the last two games of the season where his contract expired on October 26, 2024.

=== Ottawa Redblacks ===
On December 6, 2024, Knight signed with the Ottawa Redblacks. He was released during training camp on May 21, 2025. He re-signed with the Redblacks on September 2, 2025. He played in three games where he recorded one defensive tackle. He was released in the following off-season on January 23, 2026.

== Personal life ==
Knight's father, DeWayne Knight, played in parts of four seasons as a linebacker for the Ottawa Rough Riders, Winnipeg Blue Bombers, and BC Lions.
