= Robbie Smith (Canadian football) =

Canadian gridiron football player (born 1997)

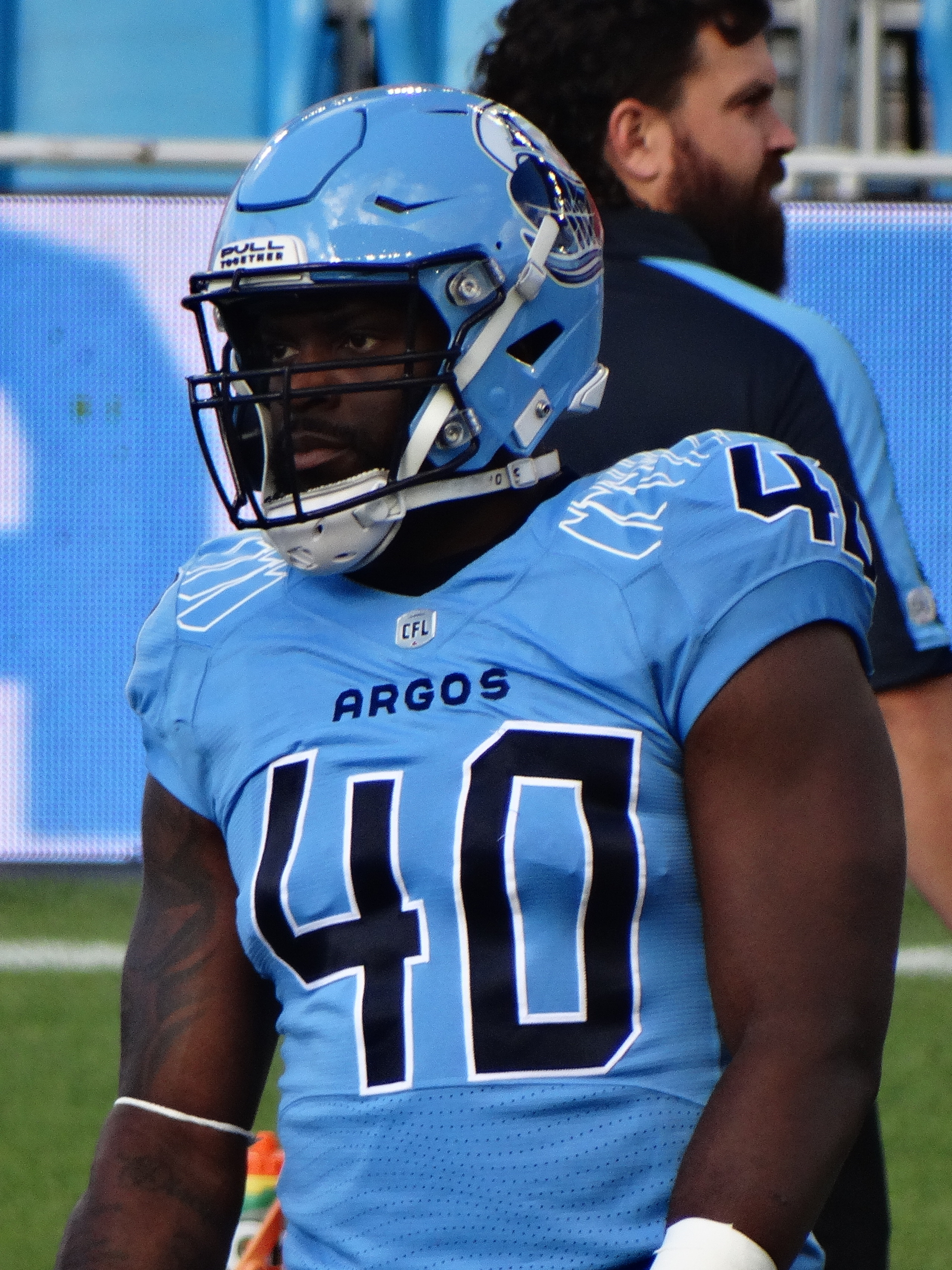
- Smith with the Toronto Argonauts in 2024

No. 40 – Edmonton Elks
- Position: Defensive lineman
- Roster status: Active
- CFL status: National

Personal information
- Born: April 17, 1997 (age 29); Brampton, Ontario, Canada
- Listed height: 6 ft 1 in (1.85 m)
- Listed weight: 245 lb (111 kg)

Career information
- High school: St. Thomas Aquinas
- University: Wilfrid Laurier
- CFL draft: 2019: 2nd round, 9th overall pick

Career history
- 2019–2024: Toronto Argonauts
- 2025–present: Edmonton Elks

Awards and highlights
- 3× Grey Cup champion (2022, 2024, 2026)

Career CFL statistics as of 2026
- Games played: 108
- Defensive tackles: 158
- ST tackles: 39
- Sacks: 21
- Forced fumbles: 3
- Interceptions: 1
- Stats at CFL.ca

Robert Smith (born April 17, 1997) is a Canadian professional football defensive lineman for the Edmonton Elks of the Canadian Football League (CFL). He is a three-time Grey Cup champion after winning with the Toronto Argonauts in 2022 and 2024 and the Elks in 2026.

== University career ==
Smith played U Sports football with the Wilfrid Laurier Golden Hawks from 2015 to 2018. He was a member of the 2016 Yates Cup championship team and was named an OUA All-Star in 2017 and 2018.

== Professional career ==
Pre-draft measurables
Height	Weight	40-yard dash	20-yard shuttle	Three-cone drill	Vertical jump	Broad jump	Bench press
6 ft 1 3/4 in (1.87 m)	242 lb (110 kg)	4.78 s	4.46 s	7.34 s	36.0 in (0.91 m)	10 ft 1 1/8 in (3.08 m)	23 reps
All values from CFL Combine

=== Toronto Argonauts ===
Smith was drafted ninth overall in the 2019 CFL draft by the Toronto Argonauts and signed with the team on May 16, 2019. He made his professional debut on June 22, 2019, against the Hamilton Tiger-Cats. He recorded his first career sack on July 18, 2019, against the Calgary Stampeders' Nick Arbuckle. He later made his first career start on August 16, 2019, against the Edmonton Eskimos. Smith finished his rookie campaign having played in 14 regular season games, starting in four, and recorded 15 defensive tackles, one special teams tackle, four sacks, and one forced fumble. He did not play in 2020 due to the cancellation of the 2020 CFL season.

In 2021, Smith played in all 14 regular season games where he had 24 defensive tackles, six special teams tackles, one sack, and one forced fumble. In 2022, he played in 17 regular season games where he had 22 defensive tackles, seven special teams tackles, three sacks, one interception, and one forced fumble. In the 109th Grey Cup game, Smith had four defensive tackles and one sack, but took a costly facemask penalty that extended the final drive of the game for the Winnipeg Blue Bombers. However, in a measure of redemption, he blocked Winnipeg's potential game-winning field goal and Smith won his first Grey Cup championship.

In the 2023 season, Smith played in all 18 regular season games, starting in 13, where he recorded a career-high 34 defensive tackles, 11 special teams tackles, and six sacks. In 2024, he played and started in 17 regular season games where he recorded 32 defensive tackles, five special teams tackles, and six sacks. Smith started in all three post-season games, including the 111th Grey Cup where he had two defensive tackles and one sack in the Argonauts' 41–24 victory over the Winnipeg Blue Bombers.

=== Edmonton Elks ===
Smith signed with the Edmonton Elks through free agency on February 12, 2025. The contract, negotiated by General Manager Ed Hervey made Smith the highest paid defensive player in the league for 2025, during which Smith played 10 games and recorded 16 tackles and no sacks. Late in the season Smith was a healthy scratch, but received a large contract extension from Hervey.
