= Ja'Gared Davis =

American football player (born 1990)

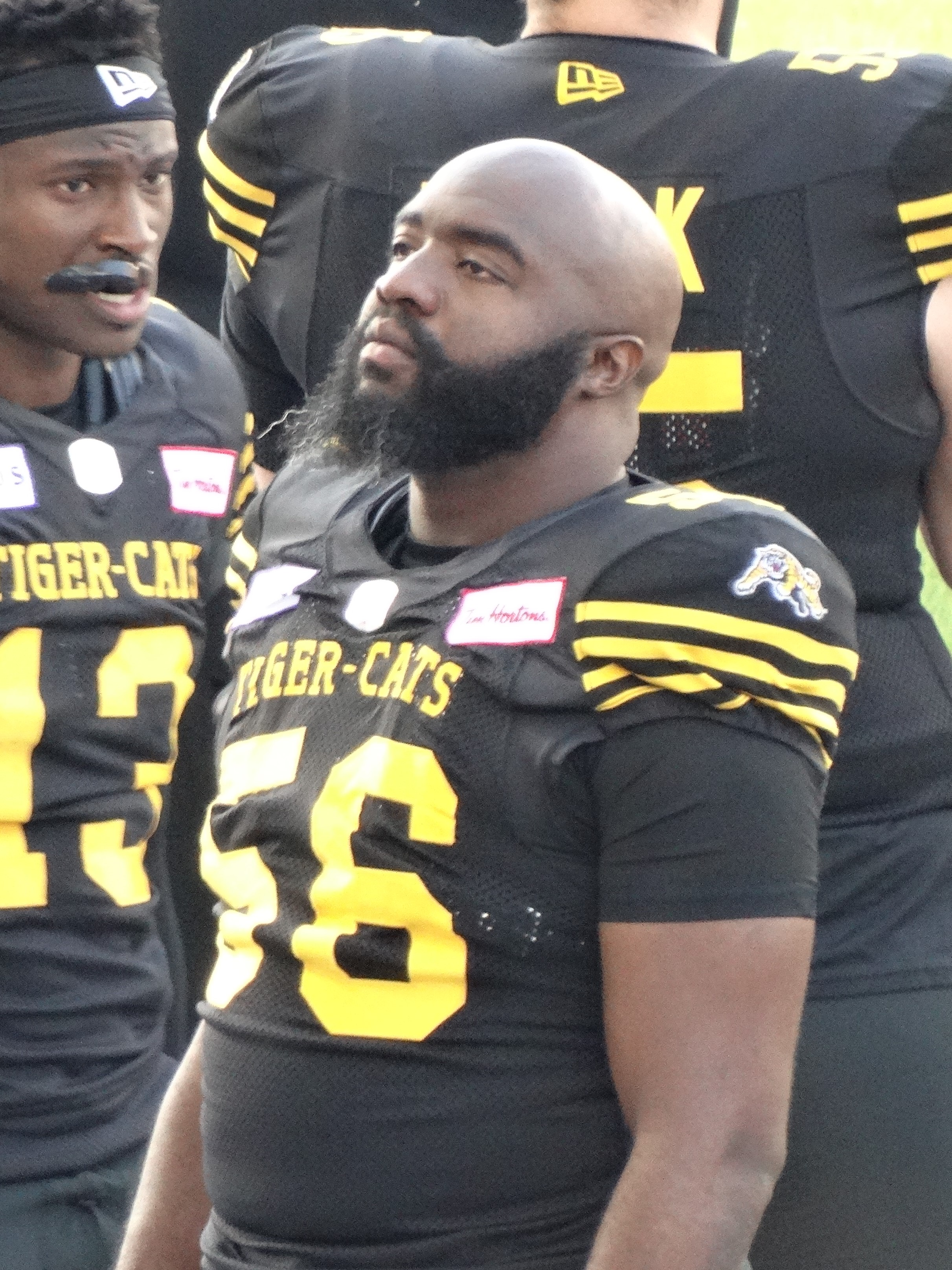
- Davis with the Hamilton Tiger-Cats in 2023

No. 53, 58, 95, 56
- Position: Defensive end

Personal information
- Born: September 11, 1990 (age 36); Crockett, Texas, U.S.
- Listed height: 6 ft 1 in (1.85 m)
- Listed weight: 238 lb (108 kg)

Career information
- High school: Crockett
- College: SMU
- NFL draft: 2013: undrafted

Career history
- Houston Texans (2013)*; New England Patriots (2013–2014); Kansas City Chiefs (2014)*; Washington Redskins (2014); Kansas City Chiefs (2015)*; Calgary Stampeders (2016–2018); Hamilton Tiger-Cats (2019–2021); Toronto Argonauts (2022); Hamilton Tiger-Cats (2023)
- * Offseason or practice squad member only

Awards and highlights
- 2× Grey Cup champion (2018, 2022); 3× CFL East All-Star (2019, 2021–2022); 2× First-team All-C-USA (2010, 2012); Second-team All-C-USA (2011)

Career NFL statistics
- Total tackles: 5
- Stats at Pro Football Reference

Career CFL statistics
- Total tackles: 310
- Sacks: 50
- Forced fumbles: 10
- Stats at CFL.ca

Ja'Gared Deniandruis Davis (born September 11, 1990) is an American former professional football player who played in the National Football League (NFL) and Canadian Football League (CFL). He was a linebacker in the NFL and a defensive end in the CFL. He is a two-time Grey Cup champion after winning in 2018 with the Calgary Stampeders and in 2022 with the Toronto Argonauts. Davis played college football at Southern Methodist University. He was signed by the Houston Texans as an undrafted free agent in 2013.

== Early life ==
He attended Crockett High School in Crockett, Texas. He was selected as the District 20-3A Defensive Co-MVP during high school.

== College career ==
He was named First-team Conference USA and was selected to CollegeFootballNews.com All-American honorable mention during his sophomore season. In his junior season, he was selected to the second-team All-C-USA. During his junior season, he was named FWAA National Defensive Player Of The Week for his performance against UTEP in which he had eight tackles, 1.5 sacks, one interception, three pass deflections, and a forced fumble in which he recovered for a touchdown. He was selected for the 2011 Rotary Lombardi Award Official Watch List prior his junior season. He was named to the second-team All-Texas by Dave Campbell's Texas Football during his senior season. He was named to the First-team All-C-USA following his senior season. He finished college with the total of 301 tackles, 20.5 sacks, 4 interceptions, 20 pass deflections, and 6 forced fumbles.

== Professional career ==
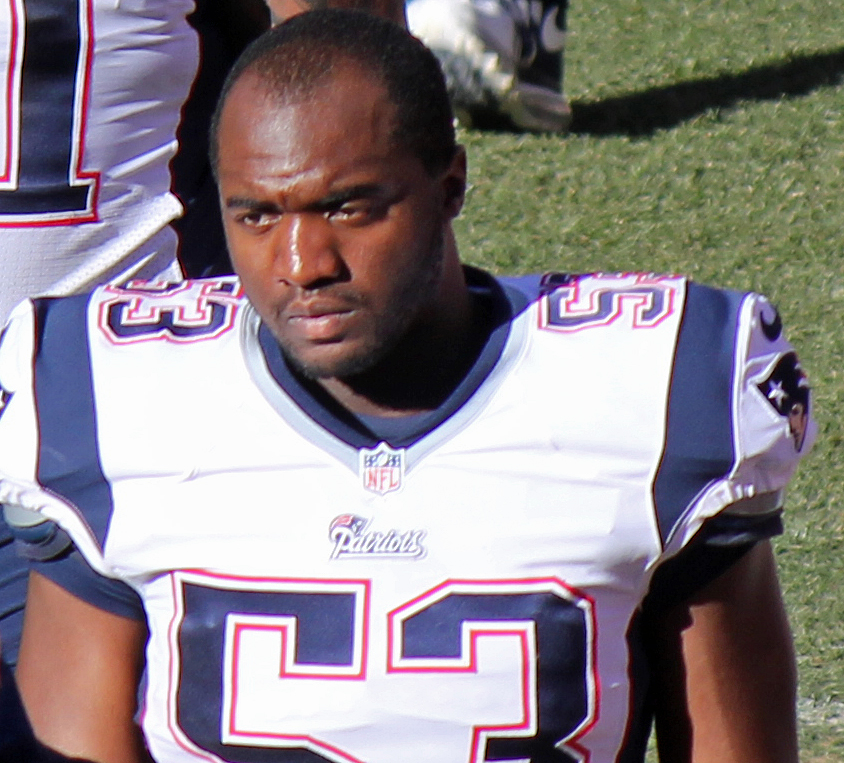
Davis with the Patriots in 2013

=== Houston Texans ===
On April 27, 2013, he signed with the Houston Texans as an undrafted free agent following the 2013 NFL draft.

=== New England Patriots ===
On August 28, 2013, Davis was claimed by the New England Patriots off waivers. He was released on October 22, 2014, after the Patriots had traded for Akeem Ayers. On October 24, the Patriots re-signed him to the practice squad. On November 22, Davis was released from the New England practice squad.

=== Kansas City Chiefs (first stint) ===
The Kansas City Chiefs signed Davis to their practice squad on November 25, 2014.

=== Washington Redskins ===
Davis was signed by the Washington Redskins off the Chiefs' practice squad on December 9, 2014. He was waived on July 31, 2015, after the Redskins signed Junior Galette.

=== Kansas City Chiefs (second stint) ===
The Chiefs signed Davis on August 17, 2015. On September 5, 2015, he was waived by the Chiefs.

=== Calgary Stampeders ===
Davis was signed by the Calgary Stampeders on May 30, 2016. On November 25, 2018, Davis and the Calgary Stampeders won the 106th Grey Cup.

=== Hamilton Tiger-Cats (first stint) ===
On February 13, 2019, Davis signed with the Hamilton Tiger-Cats for the 2019 CFL season. On February 10, 2020, Davis re-signed with the Tiger-Cats for the 2020 CFL season. He was released on September 23, 2020. He re-signed with Hamilton on January 14, 2021.

=== Toronto Argonauts ===
On February 8, 2022, Davis signed with the Toronto Argonauts for the 2022 CFL season. On November 20, 2022, Davis won his second championship with the victory in the 109th Grey Cup game. He became a free agent upon the expiry of his contract on February 14, 2023.

=== Hamilton Tiger-Cats (second stint) ===
On February 15, 2023, it was announced that Davis had re-signed with the Tiger-Cats. On May 14, 2023, Davis was placed on the team's suspended list after failing to report to training camp.

On July 25, 2023, Davis was traded to the Stampeders in exchange for a sixth-round pick in the 2024 CFL draft. After a failed physical Davis reverted to the Tiger-Cats. He became a free agent after the 2023 season.

== Personal life ==
Davis was honored by the city of Crockett with a proclamation declaring January 21, 2023 “Ja’Gared Davis Day.”
