= Geoff Crain =

Canadian football player (1930–1998)

Profile
- Position: Quarterback

Personal information
- Born: December 15, 1930; Rochester, New York, U.S.
- Died: October 25, 1998 (aged 67); Ottawa, Ontario, Canada
- Listed height: 6 ft 0 in (1.83 m)
- Listed weight: 172 lb (78 kg)

Career information
- University: McGill

Career history
- 1953–1954: Winnipeg Blue Bombers
- 1955: Ottawa Rough Riders

Geoffrey MacKay Crain (December 15, 1930 – October 25, 1998) was a Canadian football player who played for the Ottawa Rough Riders and Winnipeg Blue Bombers. Born in New York, Crain and his parents moved back to Canada when he was two years old. He played football previously at McGill University before his pro career.
