= 109th Grey Cup =

2022 Canadian Football League championship game

| Toronto Argonauts | Winnipeg Blue Bombers |
|---|---|
| (11–7) | (15–3) |
| 24 | 23 |
| Head coach: Ryan Dinwiddie | Head coach: Mike O'Shea |
| | 1 | 2 | 3 | 4 | Total |
|---|---|---|---|---|---|
| Toronto Argonauts | 3 | 4 | 7 | 10 | 24 |
| Winnipeg Blue Bombers | 0 | 10 | 7 | 6 | 23 |
- Date: November 20, 2022
- Stadium: Mosaic Stadium
- Location: Regina
- Most Valuable Player: Hénoc Muamba, LB (Argonauts)
- Most Valuable Canadian: Hénoc Muamba, LB (Argonauts)
- Favourite: Blue Bombers by 5 1/2
- National anthem: Teagan Littlechief
- Coin toss: RoseAnne Archibald
- Referee: Dave Foxcroft
- Halftime show: Jordan Davis, Tyler Hubbard and Josh Ross
- Attendance: 33,350

Broadcasters
- Network: Canada (English): TSN; Canada (French): RDS; United States: ESPN2; UK/Ireland: BT Sport
- Announcers: Rod Smith (play-by-play); Glen Suitor (analyst); Claire Hanna (sideline reporter); Farhan Lalji (sideline reporter)
- Ratings: 3.1 million (average); 8.2 million (total)

The 109th Grey Cup decided the Canadian Football League (CFL) championship for the 2022 season. The game was played on November 20, at Mosaic Stadium in Regina, Saskatchewan. It marked the fourth Grey Cup game to be held in Regina, and the first to be held at the new Mosaic Stadium as opposed to Taylor Field.

The game was played between the West Division champion Winnipeg Blue Bombers and the East Division champion Toronto Argonauts; the Argonauts won 24–23 and earned their league-leading 18th Grey Cup, preventing the Blue Bombers from becoming the first team to win three consecutive Grey Cups since the five-in-a-row Edmonton Eskimos of 1978–1982.

== Background ==
=== Host city selection ===
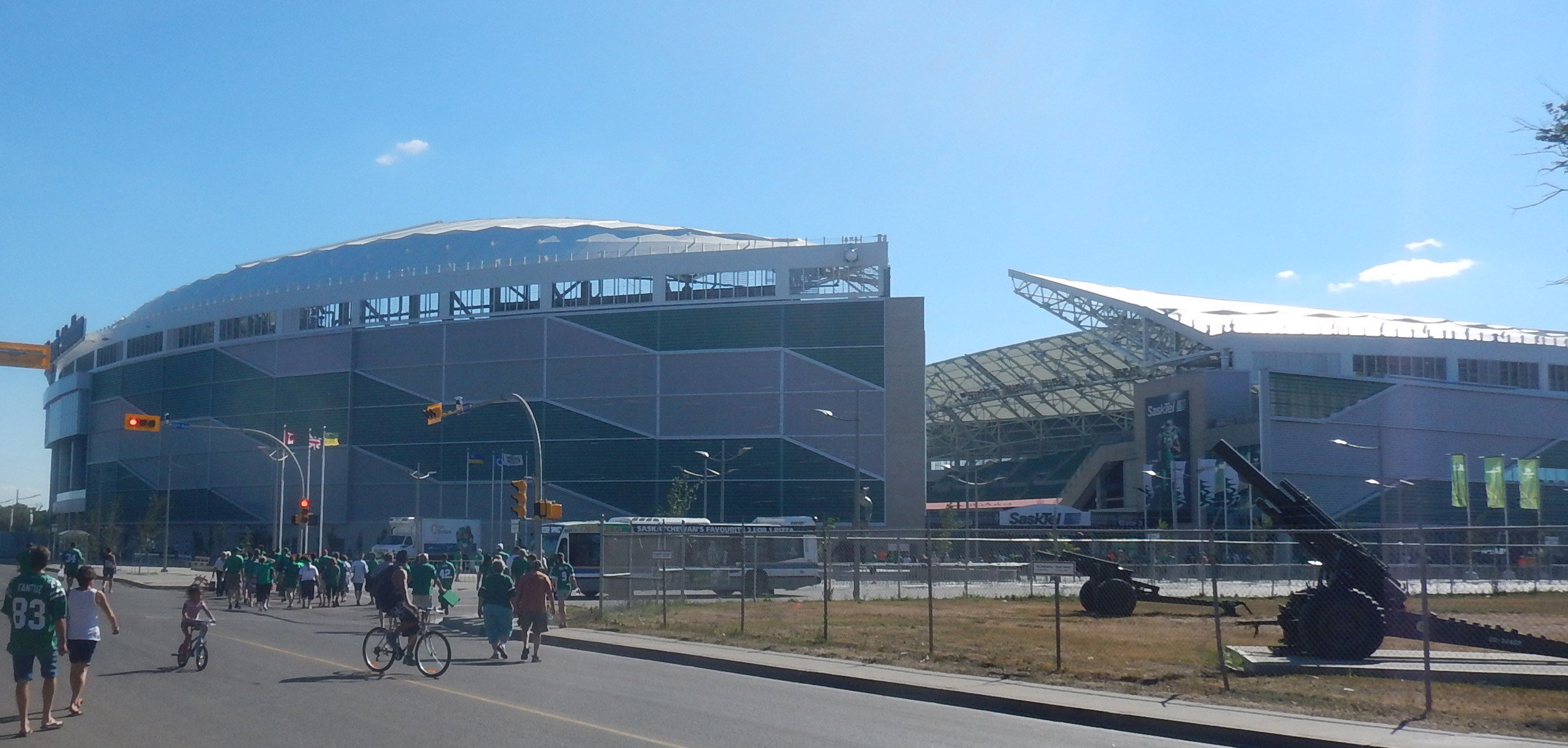
Mosaic Stadium, the host stadium of the game.

As of August 2018, three teams were interested in submitting bids to host the 2021 Grey Cup, as the league met with representatives of those unidentified clubs in Hamilton. Based on the location of the meeting and their previously stated desire to host, the Hamilton Tiger-Cats were speculated to be one of the teams. The previous obstacle—a lawsuit over the construction of Tim Hortons Field—which had prevented the Tiger-Cats from bidding on a Grey Cup game, was settled on May 31, 2018. The Tiger-Cats had previously expressed interest in submitting a bid for the 107th Grey Cup and with litigation cleared, they could move forward with bidding to host their first championship game since the 84th Grey Cup in 1996.

The first club to openly confirm their plans to bid were the Saskatchewan Roughriders, as stated by the club's president and CEO, Craig Reynolds, on October 1, 2018. The game would coincide with the 110th anniversary of the club and would be the fourth time the game would be hosted in Saskatchewan, if successful. The Roughriders' new facility, Mosaic Stadium, opened in 2017 and the Roughriders last hosted the Grey Cup in 2013.

On November 4, 2018, it was reported that the Montreal Alouettes were preparing a bid to see Olympic Stadium host the 2020 championship game. The Alouettes confirmed that they had representatives in Toronto on November 6, 2018, to make their presentation at the league head office to host the game.

It was confirmed on November 13, 2018, that the Tiger-Cats were indeed making a bid for the game as team representatives made their presentation to the league head office in Toronto the week prior. Their Grey Cup festival concept included a downtown-centred event at venues like the Hamilton Convention Centre and Art Gallery of Hamilton. The Tiger-Cats' president of business operations, Matt Afinec, confirmed that the club had support from Hamilton's mayor, Fred Eisenberger, and that three bids for the Grey Cup game had been made.

On February 21, 2019, the 2020 and 2021 Grey Cup games were awarded to Regina and Hamilton respectively. The 2020 CFL season was postponed due to the COVID-19 pandemic; on May 20, 2020, the CFL announced that the Grey Cup in Regina had been cancelled, and that the game would be played at the home field of the team with the better regular season record, if played at all. Regina was therefore awarded the Grey Cup game played in 2022. The 2020 season was cancelled in full in August 2020.

=== Entertainment ===
The Grey Cup Festival was held at REAL District during the week preceding the game. Teagan Littlechief of the White Bear First Nations performed "O Canada", with lyrics sung in English, French, and Cree languages, marking the first time that the anthem was sung in three languages and sung in an Indigenous language. Valley performed the SiriusXM Grey Cup Kickoff Show, while country musicians Jordan Davis, Tyler Hubbard, and Josh Ross performed the Twisted Tea Grey Cup Halftime Show.

== Teams ==
The game featured the two teams with the most Grey Cup championship appearances, with the Winnipeg Blue Bombers playing in their 27th game and the Toronto Argonauts playing in their 24th game. The Argonauts were attempting to win their league-leading 18th championship while the Blue Bombers were vying for their 13th championship, which would become the third-most in Grey Cup history. The Blue Bombers were also attempting to win their third consecutive Grey Cup, which has not been accomplished since the Edmonton Eskimos won five in a row from 1978 to 1982.

=== Winnipeg Blue Bombers ===
The Blue Bombers once again finished a dominant season with a franchise best 15–3 record and a second consecutive first-place finish in the West Division. The team opened the season with nine straight victories, which was second in franchise history to the 1960 team that won ten in a row to open the season. The Blue Bombers secured a playoff spot with eight weeks left in the regular season with a victory over the Saskatchewan Roughriders in the Labour Day Classic on September 4. The team then clinched first place in the West in week 18 on October 8 with two games left on the schedule and 36 days in between meaningful games. The team finished with a 10–1 division record with the lone loss coming from the BC Lions after the Blue Bombers had already clinched first place and were resting starting players. The Blue Bombers defeated the Lions in the West Final by a score of 28–20 behind a strong rushing performance by Brady Oliveira and a punt return touchdown by Janarion Grant.

The Blue Bombers' quarterback, Zach Collaros, won his second consecutive Most Outstanding Player Award and All-Star nomination and finished second in franchise history with 37 touchdown passes in the season. The team's head coach, Mike O'Shea won the CFL Coach of the Year Award for the second year in a row and the team's left tackle, Stanley Bryant, won the CFL's Most Outstanding Offensive Lineman Award for the fourth time in five seasons — no other player has won more than twice. At receiver, the team was led by rookie standout Dalton Schoen who led the league in receiving yards and touchdowns and was named the CFL's Most Outstanding Rookie. The team featured six league All-Stars, but just one on defence despite leading the league in points allowed, offensive touchdowns allowed, and net offensive yards allowed.

=== Toronto Argonauts ===
The Argonauts finished in first place in the East Division for the second consecutive year with a regular season record of 11–7. The team began the year with just four wins in nine games, but finished the year with a 7–2 record, five of which were on the road, and won seven total games away from their home stadium, BMO Field. The team qualified for the playoffs in week 13 and clinched a first-place finish in the penultimate regular season game against the Montreal Alouettes, who were also contesting first place in the East. The Argonauts last finished with consecutive first place division finishes in 1996 and 1997 when the team also won back-to-back Grey Cups. In the East Final, the Argonauts jumped out to a 21–3 lead over the Alouettes and held on to a 34–27 victory after quarterback McLeod Bethel-Thompson passed for 299 yards with a 70.4% completion rate and the game-clinching third quarter touchdown pass to Kurleigh Gittens Jr.

Despite being with the team since 2017, quarterback McLeod Bethel-Thompson entered the season as the undisputed starter for the first time in his career and was named an East Division All-Star after leading the league in passing yards. He was scheduled to play in his first Grey Cup game as a starter. The team had no major award winners, but head coach Ryan Dinwiddie was named the East Division coach of the year after leading the team to another first-place finish in just his second year with the Argonauts. The team featured three CFL All-Stars with Kurleigh Gittens Jr. leading all national receivers with a team-leading 1,101 receiving yards and was the East Division Most Outstanding Canadian. Defensive end Ja'Gared Davis would play in his sixth consecutive Grey Cup game, but sought just his second championship after winning with the 2018 Calgary Stampeders. Five-time All-Star running back Andrew Harris would face his former team after winning back-to-back Grey Cups with the Blue Bombers and winning the Grey Cup Most Valuable Player award in 2019.

=== Head-to-head ===
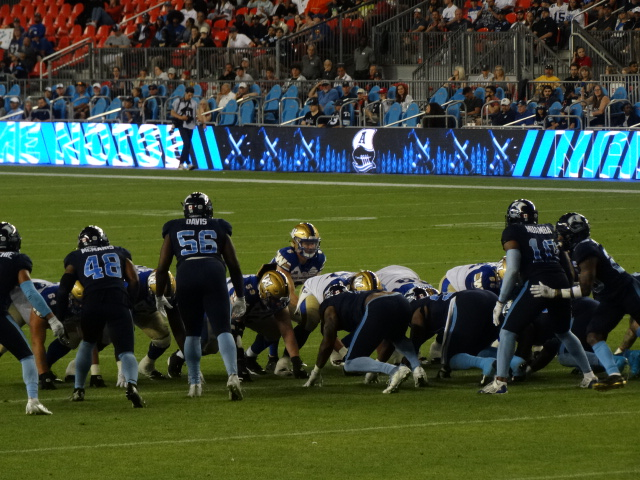
The Blue Bombers played the Argonauts on July 4, 2022.

The Winnipeg Blue Bombers and Toronto Argonauts met just once during the regular season, in Toronto, at the end of week 4. Winnipeg scored two first quarter touchdowns, including an interception returned for a touchdown by Winston Rose, and held a 17–3 lead at halftime. Despite the deficit, the Argonauts committed to the run game in the second half and Andrew Harris finished with 22 carries for 111 yards in the first meeting against his former team. Trailing by seven points with 30 seconds left in the game, McLeod Bethel-Thompson threw a two-yard touchdown pass to Markeith Ambles, but placekicker Boris Bede missed the potential game-tying convert and the Blue Bombers held on to win 23–22.

This championship was the seventh meeting between the two teams in the championship game, with all 7 having been won by Toronto, the most recent being one of the most famous: the 1950 Mud Bowl. The 72-year gap between meetings is the longest-ever continuous gap between meetings of two traditional East and West opponents. The Argonauts won the first meeting in 1937 and repeated as champions in 1938. Toronto then won three consecutive championships over the Blue Bombers in 1945, 1946, and 1947. All six of these championship games were played at Varsity Stadium, in Toronto.

=== Uniforms ===
As the West Division representative in a Grey Cup held in a West Division city, the Winnipeg Blue Bombers were the designated home team for the game and used the home locker room. However, the Blue Bombers wore their road white jerseys with gold pants which were the same uniforms worn in the previous two Grey Cup games by the team. The Argonauts wore their home blue jerseys and blue pants and used the visitors' locker room.

== Game summary ==
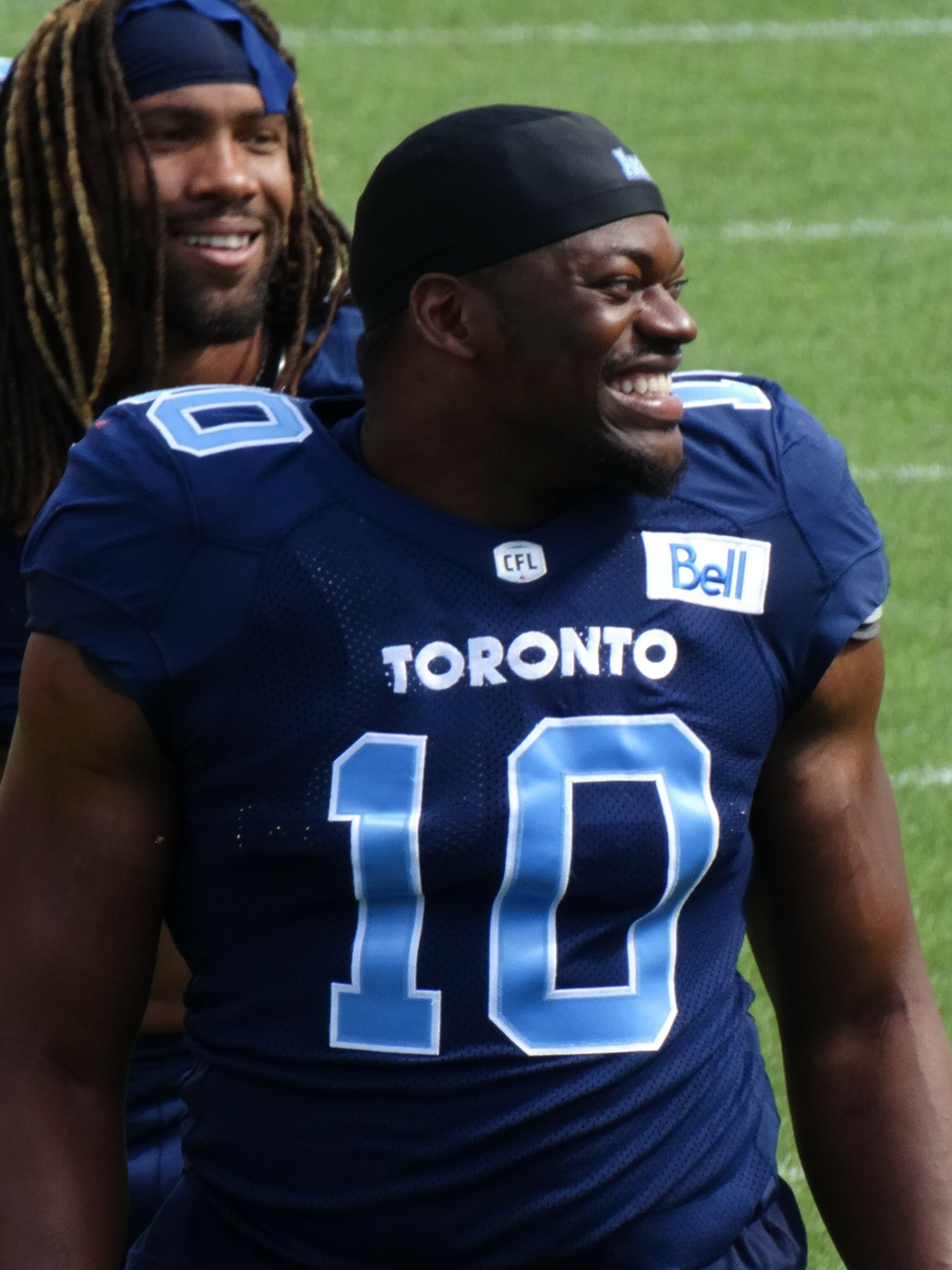
Hénoc Muamba was the game's MVP and MVC.

The game began fairly defensively, with neither team making a first down on their first possessions, and the only points in the first quarter being a field goal by Toronto's Boris Bede. The second quarter opened with another such attempt, but it sailed wide for the single point. Winnipeg immediately answered with a nearly 40-yard throw to Rookie of the Year Dalton Schoen, beginning a drive that ended in a short touchdown rush by Dakota Prukop. The two teams traded field goals before the first half ended with Winnipeg leading 10–7.

The second half opened with a poor punt by Marc Liegghio giving Toronto prime field position, allowing them to strike quickly with an A. J. Ouellette touchdown. Winnipeg then spent seven minutes driving down the field in a penalty-aided drive that ended in another Prukop major score. The teams traded a few punts before the third quarter ended with Winnipeg leading 17–14.

For the first play of the fourth quarter, John Haggerty punted the ball down to the Winnipeg eight-yard line, only for it to be returned for a Grey Cup record 102-yard touchdown by Janarion Grant, but Liegghio's kick for the convert went wide. Toronto was only able to muster a field goal in response to make the score 23–17, and were unable to capitalize on an interception soon after, with Chad Kelly replacing an injured McLeod Bethel-Thompson at QB. Liegghio then produced another poor punt, the return by Javon Leake taking the ball past the line of scrimmage, putting Toronto in prime position once again. After a failed challenge for pass interference, and Brandon Banks taking a penalty for being rude to the referee, Kelly pulled off a big 20-yard run to keep the drive going. Ouellette scored another rushing touchdown, with the successful convert giving Toronto the lead, 24–23.

On Winnipeg's first play after the kickoff, Zach Collaros was picked off by Hénoc Muamba with just over three minutes to go, giving Toronto the ball again at the edge of field goal range. Failing to gain any ground, they made the kick attempt, but it was blocked by Nick Hallett, giving the Bombers one last chance. On 3rd-and-13, Toronto managed to sack Collaros, on the second consecutive play, to potentially end the game, but Robbie Smith picked up a face-masking penalty to extend Winnipeg's hopes. The drive continued up to the 40-yard line with under a minute to go, so facing third down again, Winnipeg chose to attempt to kick a field goal that would give them the lead. The try was blocked by Smith, returning possession to Toronto, winning the Argonauts the game 24–23.

Muamba was named the game's Most Valuable Player and also received the Dick Suderman Trophy as the game's Most Valuable Canadian.

=== Scoring summary ===
First quarter

TOR – FG Bede 46 yards (10:34) 3–0 TOR

Second quarter

TOR – Single Bede 49 yards (Missed 36-yard field goal attempt, wide right) (12:45) 4–0 TOR
WPG – TD Prukop 1-yard run (Liegghio convert) (7:52) 7–4 WPG
TOR – FG Bede 36 yards (3:47) 7–7
WPG – FG Liegghio 45 yards (0:45) 10–7 WPG

Third quarter

TOR – TD Ouellette 4-yard run (Bede convert) (11:51) 14–10 TOR
WPG – TD Prukop 1-yard run (Liegghio convert) (4:05) 17–14 WPG

Fourth quarter

WPG – TD Grant 102-yard punt return (Liegghio convert failed) (15:00) 23–14 WPG
TOR – FG Bede 36 yards (12:40) 23–17 WPG
TOR – TD Ouellette 5-yard run (Bede convert) (3:55) 24–23 TOR

=== Individual statistics ===
Sources: CFL 109th Grey Cup Boxscore

Blue Bombers passing
| Player | CP/AT | Pct | Yards | TD | Int |
|---|---|---|---|---|---|
| (United States) Zach Collaros | 14/23 | 60.9% | 183 | 0 | 1 |
| (United States) Dakota Prukop | 0/2 | 0.0% | 0 | 0 | 1 |
Blue Bombers rushing
| Player | Car | Yards | Avg | Lg | TD |
| (Canada) Brady Oliveira | 15 | 82 | 5.5 | 13 | 0 |
| (United States) Dakota Prukop | 5 | 9 | 1.8 | 4 | 2 |
| (United States) Zach Collaros | 1 | 7 | 7.0 | 7 | 0 |
| (Canada) Nic Demski | 2 | 5 | 2.5 | 6 | 0 |
Blue Bombers receiving
| Player | Rec | Yards | Avg | Lg | TD |
| (United States) Dalton Schoen | 3 | 78 | 26.0 | 39 | 0 |
| (United States) Greg Ellingson | 4 | 46 | 11.5 | 24 | 0 |
| (United States) Rasheed Bailey | 2 | 24 | 12.0 | 17 | 0 |
| (Canada) Nic Demski | 3 | 23 | 7.7 | 15 | 0 |
| (Canada) Drew Wolitarsky | 1 | 8 | 8.0 | 8 | 0 |
| (Canada) Brady Oliveira | 1 | 4 | 4.0 | 4 | 0 |
Blue Bombers defence
| Player | DT–ST | QS | Int | FR | FF |
| (United States) Casey Sayles | 6–0 | 1 | 0 | 0 | 0 |
| (United States) Winston Rose | 5–0 | 0 | 0 | 0 | 0 |
| (United States) Jamal Parker | 4–0 | 0 | 0 | 0 | 0 |
| (United States) Brandon Alexander | 4–0 | 0 | 0 | 0 | 0 |
| (United States) Desmond Lawrence | 4–0 | 0 | 0 | 0 | 0 |
| (United States) Malik Clements | 3–1 | 0 | 0 | 0 | 0 |
| (United States) Alden Darby | 3–0 | 0 | 0 | 0 | 0 |
| (United States) Jackson Jeffcoat | 2–0 | 1 | 0 | 1 | 1 |
| (Canada) Jake Thomas | 1–0 | 0 | 0 | 0 | 0 |
| (United States) Rasheed Bailey | 1–0 | 0 | 0 | 0 | 0 |
| (United States) Adam Bighill | 1–0 | 0 | 0 | 0 | 0 |
| (United States) Ricky Walker | 1–0 | 0 | 0 | 0 | 0 |
| (Canada) Brady Oliveira | 1–0 | 0 | 0 | 0 | 0 |
| (United States) Deatrick Nichols | 1–0 | 0 | 0 | 0 | 0 |
| (Japan) Les Maruo | 0–2 | 0 | 0 | 0 | 0 |
| (Canada) Nick Hallett | 0–2 | 0 | 0 | 0 | 0 |
| (Canada) Johnny Augustine | 0–1 | 0 | 0 | 0 | 0 |
| (Canada) Mike Benson | 0–1 | 0 | 0 | 0 | 0 |
| (Canada) Jesse Briggs | 0–1 | 0 | 0 | 0 | 0 |
| (United States) Brian Cole II | 0–1 | 0 | 0 | 0 | 0 |
| (Canada) Shayne Gauthier | 0–1 | 0 | 0 | 0 | 0 |
| (United States) Willie Jefferson | 0–1 | 0 | 0 | 0 | 0 |
Blue Bombers placekicking
| Player | FM–FA | Lng | Avg | Sng | CM-CA |
| (Canada) Marc Liegghio | 1–2 | 45 | 45.0 | 0 | 1–2 |
Blue Bombers punting
| Player | No | GAv | NAv | Sng | Lng |
| (Canada) Marc Liegghio | 8 | 39.1 | 24.6 | 0 | 47 |
Blue Bombers punt returns
| Player | PR | Yards | Avg | Lg | TD |
| (United States) Janarion Grant | 6 | 152 | 25.3 | 102 | 1 |
Blue Bombers kickoff returns
| Player | PR | Yards | Avg | Lg | TD |
| (United States) Janarion Grant | 3 | 71 | 23.7 | 27 | 0 |

Argonauts passing
| Player | CP/AT | Pct | Yards | TD | Int |
|---|---|---|---|---|---|
| (United States) McLeod Bethel-Thompson | 15/28 | 53.6% | 203 | 0 | 0 |
| (United States) Chad Kelly | 4/6 | 66.7% | 43 | 0 | 0 |
Argonauts rushing
| Player | Car | Yards | Avg | Lg | TD |
| (Canada) Andrew Harris | 10 | 55 | 5.5 | 16 | 0 |
| (United States) A. J. Ouellette | 6 | 24 | 4.0 | 7 | 2 |
| (United States) Chad Kelly | 2 | 21 | 10.5 | 20 | 0 |
Argonauts receiving
| Player | Rec | Yards | Avg | Lg | TD |
| (United States) Cam Phillips | 4 | 96 | 24.0 | 37 | 0 |
| (United States) DaVaris Daniels | 7 | 58 | 8.3 | 13 | 0 |
| (United States) Markeith Ambles | 3 | 47 | 15.7 | 17 | 0 |
| (United States) Brandon Banks | 3 | 31 | 10.3 | 13 | 0 |
| (Canada) Andrew Harris | 1 | 14 | 14.0 | 14 | 0 |
| (United States) A. J. Ouellette | 1 | 0 | 0.0 | 0 | 0 |
Argonauts defence
| Player | DT–ST | QS | Int | FR | FF |
| (United States) Jonathan Jones | 5–1 | 0 | 0 | 0 | 0 |
| (Canada) Robbie Smith | 4–0 | 1 | 0 | 0 | 0 |
| (United States) Tarvarus McFadden | 4–0 | 0 | 0 | 0 | 0 |
| (Canada) Jack Cassar | 3–4 | 0 | 0 | 0 | 0 |
| (Canada) Royce Metchie | 3–0 | 0 | 0 | 0 | 0 |
| (Canada) Hénoc Muamba | 3–0 | 0 | 1 | 0 | 0 |
| (United States) Shaquille Richardson | 2–0 | 0 | 1 | 0 | 0 |
| (United States) Chris Edwards | 2–0 | 1 | 0 | 0 | 0 |
| (United States) Shawn Oakman | 2–0 | 1 | 0 | 0 | 0 |
| (United States) Brandon Barlow | 2–0 | 0 | 0 | 0 | 0 |
| (United States) Jared Brinkman | 2–0 | 0 | 0 | 0 | 0 |
| (United States) Jamal Peters | 2–0 | 0 | 0 | 0 | 0 |
| (United States) Dewayne Hendrix | 1–0 | 1 | 0 | 0 | 1 |
| (United States) Robert Priester | 1–1 | 0 | 0 | 0 | 0 |
| (United States) DaShaun Amos | 1–0 | 0 | 0 | 0 | 0 |
| (Canada) Dariusz Bladek | 1–0 | 0 | 0 | 0 | 0 |
| (United States) Ja'Gared Davis | 1–0 | 0 | 0 | 0 | 0 |
| (Canada) Dejon Brissett | 0–1 | 0 | 0 | 0 | 0 |
| (Canada) Gregor MacKellar | 0–1 | 0 | 0 | 0 | 0 |
| (Canada) Daniel Adeboboye | 0–1 | 0 | 0 | 0 | 0 |
Argonauts placekicking
| Player | FM–FA | Lng | Avg | Sng | CM-CA |
| (United States) Boris Bede | 3–6 | 46 | 39.3 | 1 | 2–2 |
Argonauts punting
| Player | No | GAv | NAv | Sng | Lng |
| (Australia) John Haggerty | 6 | 49.2 | 23.8 | 0 | 52 |
Argonauts punt returns
| Player | PR | Yards | Avg | Lg | TD |
| (United States) Javon Leake | 6 | 116 | 19.3 | 44 | 0 |
Argonauts kickoff returns
| Player | PR | Yards | Avg | Lg | TD |
| (United States) Javon Leake | 4 | 80 | 20.0 | 23 | 0 |

== Depth charts ==
The following diagrams illustrate the teams' depth charts that were released one day prior to game day. Starters are listed in boxes in their respective positions with backups listed directly above or below. As per CFL rules, 45 of the 46 players for each team would dress in the game. Winnipeg's Keion Adams was listed as a game-time decision and was ultimately replaced by Ricky Walker.

=== Winnipeg Blue Bombers ===
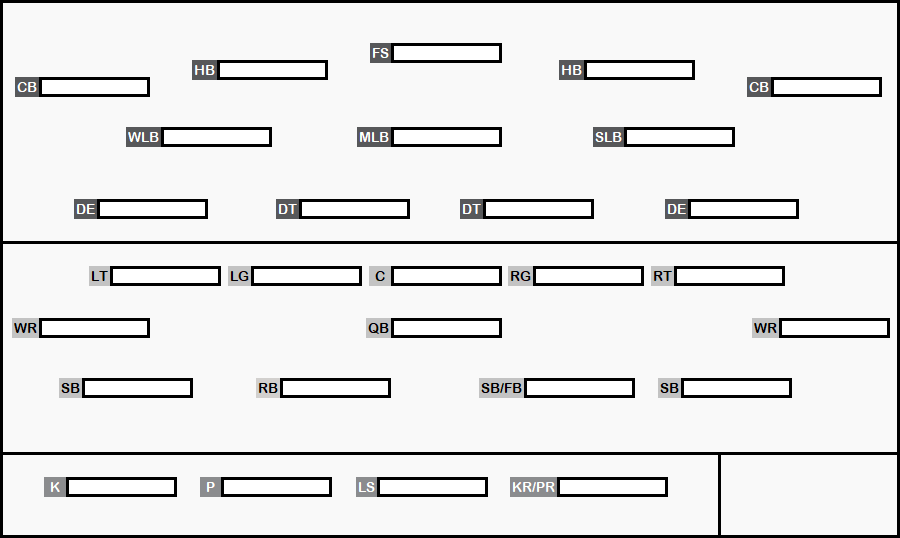

=== Toronto Argonauts ===
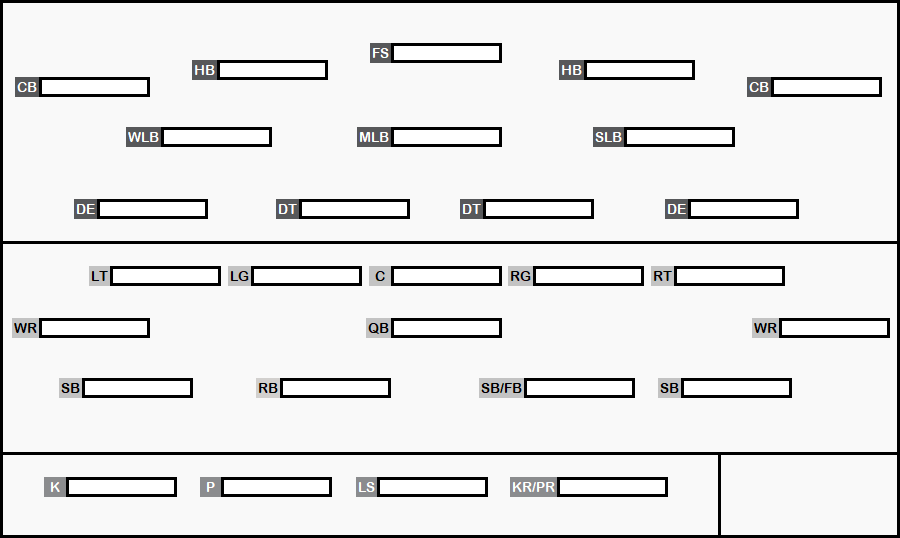

== Officials ==
The highest rated officials during the 2022 CFL season from their respective positions were selected for the game and announced on November 17, 2022. The numbers below indicate their uniform numbers.

- Referee: No. 30 Dave Foxcroft
- Umpire: No. 24 Troy Semenchuk
- Down Judge: No. 25 Ron Barss
- Line Judge: No. 81 Walt Hawrysh
- Side Judge: No. 75 Dave Gatza
- Back Judge: No. 59 Larry Butler
- Field Judge: No. 73 Brian Chrupalo
- Backup Referee: No. 74 Tim Kroeker
- Backup Official: No. 36 Tom Cesari
- Backup Official: No. 22 Murray Clarke
- Backup Official: No. 37 Jason Maggio
