= 2021 Toronto Argonauts season =

CFL team season

- General manager: Michael Clemons
- Head coach: Ryan Dinwiddie
- Home stadium: BMO Field

Results
- Record: 9–5
- Division place: 1st, East
- Playoffs: Lost East Final
- Team MOP: McLeod Bethel-Thompson
- Team MOC: Kurleigh Gittens Jr.
- Team MOR: Peter Nicastro

Uniform

The 2021 Toronto Argonauts season was the 63rd season for the team in the Canadian Football League (CFL) and their 148th year of existence. The Argonauts improved on their 4–14 record from their previous season in 2019 with a win in week 10 against the Ottawa Redblacks on October 6, 2021. The team qualified for the playoffs for the first time since 2017, on October 30, 2021, with a win over the BC Lions. The Argonauts then clinched first place in the East Division after defeating the Hamilton Tiger-Cats on November 12, 2021. However, the Argonauts lost to the same Tiger-Cats in the East Final after holding a 12–0 halftime lead, but were unable to score a touchdown and lost 27–19.

This was the first full season with Michael Clemons as general manager following his appointment mid-way through the 2019 season. This was also the first season for head coach Ryan Dinwiddie.

An 18-game season schedule was originally released on November 20, 2020, but it was announced on April 21, 2021, that the start of the season would likely be delayed until August and feature a 14-game schedule. On June 15, 2021, the league released the revised 14-game schedule with regular season play beginning on August 5, 2021.

== Offseason ==
=== CFL global draft ===
The 2021 CFL global draft took place on April 15, 2021. With the format being a snake draft, the Argonauts selected third in the odd-numbered rounds and seventh in the even-numbered rounds. The team exchanged their third-round pick for a fourth-round pick as part of a three-player trade with the Calgary Stampeders.

Round	Pick	Player	Position	University/Club Team	Nationality
1	3	Tigie Sankoh	DB	London Warriors	(United Kingdom) Great Britain
2	16	Toshiki Sato	K	IBM Big Blue	Japan
4	30	Max Duffy	P	Kentucky	Australia
4	34	Sammis Reyes	REC	Tulane	Chile

== CFL national draft ==
The 2021 CFL draft took place on May 4, 2021. The Argonauts had seven selections in the six-round snake draft and had the seventh pick in odd rounds and the third pick in even rounds. The team acquired an additional fourth-round selection after trading Shawn Lemon to the BC Lions in exchange for Davon Coleman. The Argonauts also swapped their fifth-round pick for the Stampeders' sixth round-pick in a three-player trade and they exchanged sixth-round picks with the Blue Bombers in the trade for Cody Speller.

Round	Pick	Player	Position	University team	Hometown
1	7	Peter Nicastro	OL	Calgary	Calgary, AB
2	12	Sage Doxtater	OL	New Mexico State	Welland, ON
3	25	Luiji Vilain	DL	Michigan	Ottawa, ON
4	30	Tommy Nield	WR	McMaster	Guelph, ON
4	33	Trevor Hoyte	LB	Carleton	Gatineau, QC
6	47	Joshua Hagerty	DB	Saskatchewan	Regina, SK
6	52	Benjamin St-Juste	DB	Minnesota	Montreal, QC

== Preseason ==
Pre-season games were not played due to the shortening of the season.

=== Planned schedule ===
Week	Game	Date	Kickoff	Opponent	TV	Venue
A	Bye					
B	1	Thu, May 27	7:30 p.m. EDT	vs. Hamilton Tiger-Cats	NA	BMO Field
C	2	Thu, June 3	7:30 p.m. EDT	at Hamilton Tiger-Cats	NA	Tim Hortons Field

== Regular season ==
=== Standings ===
East Division
Team	GP	W	L	T	Pts	PF	PA	Div	Stk	
Toronto Argonauts	14	9	5	0	18	309	318	6–2	L1	Details
Hamilton Tiger-Cats	14	8	6	0	16	312	244	4–4	W1	Details
Montreal Alouettes	14	7	7	0	14	356	295	5–3	L1	Details
Ottawa Redblacks	14	3	11	0	6	224	384	1–7	W1	Details

=== Schedule ===
The Argonauts initially had a schedule that featured 18 regular season games beginning on June 19 and ending on October 30. The team was scheduled to be the home team for a neutral site game at an unannounced location on July 10 for a match-up with the Calgary Stampeders. However, due to the COVID-19 pandemic in Canada, the Canadian Football League delayed the start of the regular season to August 5, 2021, and the Argonauts began their 14-game season on August 7, 2021.

On August 22, 2021, it was announced that the Edmonton Elks had several players test positive for COVID-19, so the August 26, 2021 game was postponed with the rescheduled date to be declared once the Elks pass health and safety protocols. The CFL announced on September 2, 2021, that the game was rescheduled for Tuesday, November 16, 2021, where the Argonauts originally had a bye week.

Week	Game	Date	Kickoff	Opponent	Results		TV	Venue	Attendance	Summary
Week	Game	Date	Kickoff	Opponent	Score	Record	TV	Venue	Attendance	Summary
1	1	Sat, Aug 7	7:00 p.m. EDT	@ Calgary Stampeders	W 23–20	1–0	TSN	McMahon Stadium	23,921	Recap
2	2	Fri, Aug 13	8:30 p.m. EDT	@ Winnipeg Blue Bombers	L 7–20	1–1	TSN/RDS	IG Field	22,143	Recap
3	3	Sat, Aug 21	4:00 p.m. EDT	Winnipeg Blue Bombers	W 30–23	2–1	TSN/ESPN2	BMO Field	9,866	Recap
4	Bye (originally scheduled for Thurs, Aug 26, vs. Edmonton Elks; rescheduled to week 16)									
5	4	Mon, Sept 6	1:00 p.m. EDT	@ Hamilton Tiger-Cats	L 19–32	2–2	TSN/RDS2	Tim Hortons Field	15,000	Recap
6	5	Fri, Sept 10	7:30 p.m. EDT	Hamilton Tiger-Cats	W 17–16	3–2	TSN/RDS2	BMO Field	9,702	Recap
7	6	Fri, Sept 17	9:45 p.m. EDT	@ Saskatchewan Roughriders	L 16–30	3–3	TSN	Mosaic Stadium	25,883	Recap
8	7	Fri, Sept 24	7:30 p.m. EDT	Montreal Alouettes	W 30–27	4–3	TSN/RDS	BMO Field	7,758	Recap
9	Bye									
10	8	Wed, Oct 6	7:30 p.m. EDT	Ottawa Redblacks	W 35–16	5–3	TSN/RDS2	BMO Field	6,788	Recap
10	9	Mon, Oct 11	4:00 p.m. EDT	@ Hamilton Tiger-Cats	W 24–23	6–3	TSN	Tim Hortons Field	21,378	Recap
11	Bye									
12	10	Fri, Oct 22	7:30 p.m. EDT	@ Montreal Alouettes	L 16–37	6–4	TSN/RDS	Molson Stadium	12,142	Recap
13	11	Sat, Oct 30	4:00 p.m. EDT	BC Lions	W 31–29 (OT)	7–4	TSN	BMO Field	9,011	Recap
14	12	Sat, Nov 6	4:00 p.m. EDT	@ Ottawa Redblacks	W 23–20	8–4	TSN/RDS2	TD Place Stadium	18,644	Recap
15	13	Fri, Nov 12	7:30 p.m. EST	Hamilton Tiger-Cats	W 31–12	9–4	TSN/ESPNews	BMO Field	10,851	Recap
16	14	Tues, Nov 16 †	7:30 p.m. EST	Edmonton Elks	L 7–13	9–5	TSN	BMO Field	6,247	Recap

# Games played with colour uniforms.
# Games played with white uniforms.
† Game rescheduled from August 26 due to an outbreak of COVID-19 among Edmonton players.

== Post-season ==
=== Schedule ===
Game	Date	Kickoff	Opponent	Results		TV	Venue	Attendance	Summary
Game	Date	Kickoff	Opponent	Score	Record	TV	Venue	Attendance	Summary
East Semi-Final	Bye								
East Final	Sun, Dec 5	12:30 p.m. EST	Hamilton Tiger-Cats	L 19–27	0–1	TSN/RDS/ESPNews	BMO Field	21,492	Recap

# Games played with colour uniforms.

== Team ==
=== Roster ===
Toronto Argonauts roster
**Quarterbacks**: 4 McLeod Bethel-Thompson; 16 Antonio Pipkin; **Receivers**: 11 Juwan Brescacin; 18 Dejon Brissett; 2 Ricky Collins; 80 DaVaris Daniels; 19 Kurleigh Gittens, Jr.; 8 Eric Rogers; 88 Chandler Worthy; **Running backs**: 29 D. J. Foster; 34 A. J. Ouellette; **Fullbacks**: 38 Declan Cross; 86 Patrick Lavoie; 36 Dion Pellerin; **Offensive linemen**: 59 Dejon Allen LT; 65 Dariusz Bladek RG; 53 Philip Blake C; 51 Theren Churchill; 62 Martez Ivey RT; 68 Shane Richards LG; 69 Jonathan Zamora	**Defensive linemen**: 96 Sam Acheampong DT; 94 Kony Ealy; 32 Cordarro Law DE; 93 Benoit Marion; 90 Shawn Oakman DT; 56 Shane Ray DE; 40 Robbie Smith; **Linebackers**: 45 Jack Cassar; 47 Alexandre Chevrier; 6 Chris Edwards; 43 Trevor Hoyte; 3 Cameron Judge; 26 Dexter McCoil; 10 Hénoc Muamba; **Defensive backs**: 24 Crezdon Butler S; 7 Jalen Collins CB; 20 Treston Decoud; 12 Jamal Peters CB; 23 Jeff Richards HB; 1 Shaquille Richardson HB; 35 Tigie Sankoh; 00 Adam Thibault; **Special teams**: 14 Boris Bede K; 46 Maxime Latour LS	**1-Game Injured list**: 28 Matthew Boateng DB; 44 Brandon Calver LB; 90 Fabion Foote DL; 64 Dylan Giffen OL; 27 Joshua Hagerty DB; 39 Charleston Hughes DE; 9 Josh Huff WR; 13 Cole McDonald QB; 92 Drake Nevis DL; 81 Tommy Nield SB; 58 Jake Reinhart LS; 37 Asnnel Robo FB; 63 Trevon Tate OL; 42 Justin Tuggle LB; 91 Junior Turner DL; **6-Game Injured list**: 87 Daniel Braverman SB/KR; 66 Isiah Cage OL; 67 Jamal Campbell OL; 17 Arjen Colquhoun DB; 25 Eli Mencer DL; 84 Llevi Noel WR; 48 Bear Woods LB; 52 Peter Nicastro OL; 5 John White RB	**Practice roster**: 83 Dres Anderson WR; 57 Thaddeus Coleman OL; 0 Robertson Daniel DB; 30 Travis Feeney DE; 99 Dewayne Hendrix DL; 82 Damion Jeanpiere WR; 85 Brian Jones WR; 44 Tarvarus McFadden DB; 33 Eric Mezzalira LB; 89 Cam Phillips WR; 70 Toshiki Sato K; 21 Cameron Scarlett RB; 41 Brady Sheldon LB; **Suspended list**: -- Sam Baker FB; -- Martavis Bryant WR; -- Keyarris Garrett WR; -- Cam Glenn DB; -- Nelkas Kwemo LB; -- James Sample DB; -- Brandon Sheperd WR; -- Nick Shortill LB; -- Cody Speller OL; -- Khyri Thornton DL; -- Robert Woodson DB
Italics indicate American player • **Bold** indicates Global player • 45 Active, 24 Injured, 13 Practice, 12 Suspended; Roster updated 2021-12-05 • Depth chart • Transactions (argonauts.ca) • Transactions (cfl.ca)

=== Coaching staff ===
Toronto Argonauts staff
**Front office and support staff**: Owner – Maple Leaf Sports & Entertainment; President – Bill Manning; General manager – Michael Clemons; Director of player personnel – John Murphy; Director of Canadian scouting – Vince Magri; Player relations advisor and football ops assistant – Matt Black	**Head coaches**: Head coach – Ryan Dinwiddie; **Offensive coaches**: Offensive coordinator and quarterbacks – Jarious Jackson; Pass game coordinator and receivers – Markus Howell; Running backs – Fred Reid; Offensive line – Stephen McAdoo; **Defensive coaches**: Defensive coordinator – Vacant; Defensive backs – Vacant; Linebackers – Kevin Eiben; Defensive line – Mike Davis; Defensive assistant – Rich Stubler; Defensive consultant – Chris Jones; **Special teams coaches**: Special teams coordinator – Mark Nelson; Assistant special teams – Kevin Eiben; → Coaching staff
