= Adam Guillemette =

Canadian gridiron football player (born 2000)

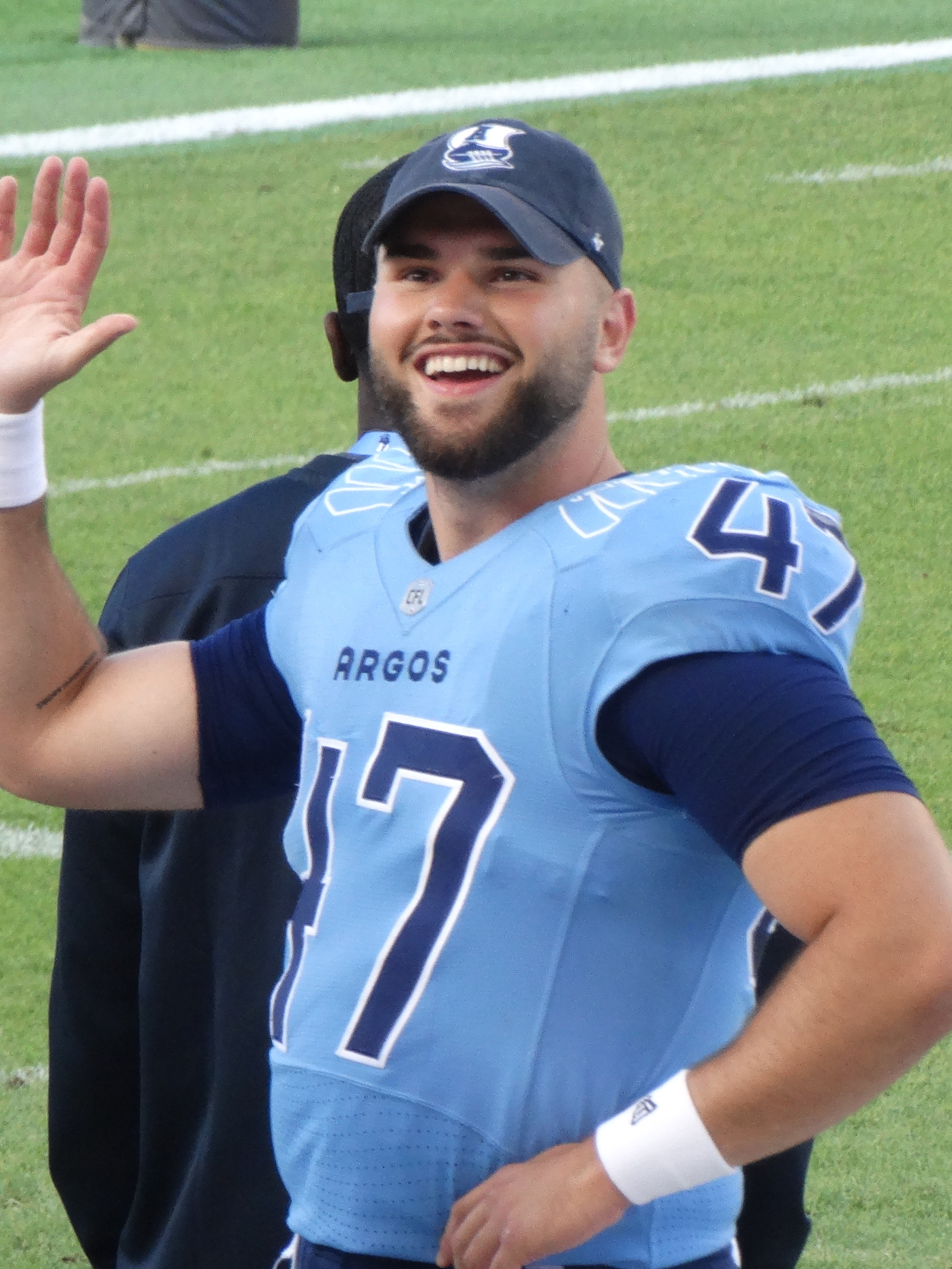
- Guillemette with the Toronto Argonauts in 2024

No. 47 – Toronto Argonauts
- Position: Long snapper
- Roster status: Active
- CFL status: National

Personal information
- Born: October 19, 2000 (age 26); Ottawa, Ontario, Canada
- Listed height: 6 ft 0 in (1.83 m)
- Listed weight: 220 lb (100 kg)

Career information
- High school: Loomis Chaffee
- College: Holy Cross
- CFL draft: 2023: 3rd round, 27th overall pick

Career history
- 2023–present: Toronto Argonauts

Awards and highlights
- Grey Cup champion (2024)
- Stats at CFL.ca

Adam Guillemette (born October 19, 2000) is a Canadian professional football long snapper for the Toronto Argonauts of the Canadian Football League (CFL).

== College career ==
Guillemette played college football for the Holy Cross Crusaders from 2019 to 2022. He played in 15 games as a long snapper.

== Professional career ==
Guillemette was drafted in the third round, 27th overall, in the 2023 CFL draft by the Toronto Argonauts and signed with the team on May 8, 2023. He won the job as the team's long snapper early in training camp in 2023, supplanting the team's incumbent, Maxime Latour, who was released on May 17, 2023. Guillemette made his professional debut in the team's season opener on June 18, 2023, against the Hamilton Tiger-Cats. He played in all 18 regular season games as well as the team's East Final loss to the Montreal Alouettes.

In 2024, Guillemette played in 17 regular season games while sitting out one due to injury. He also played in all three post-season games, including the 111th Grey Cup where the Argonauts defeated the Winnipeg Blue Bombers 41–24 and he won his first Grey Cup championship.
