= Sam Acheampong =

Canadian football player (born 1996)

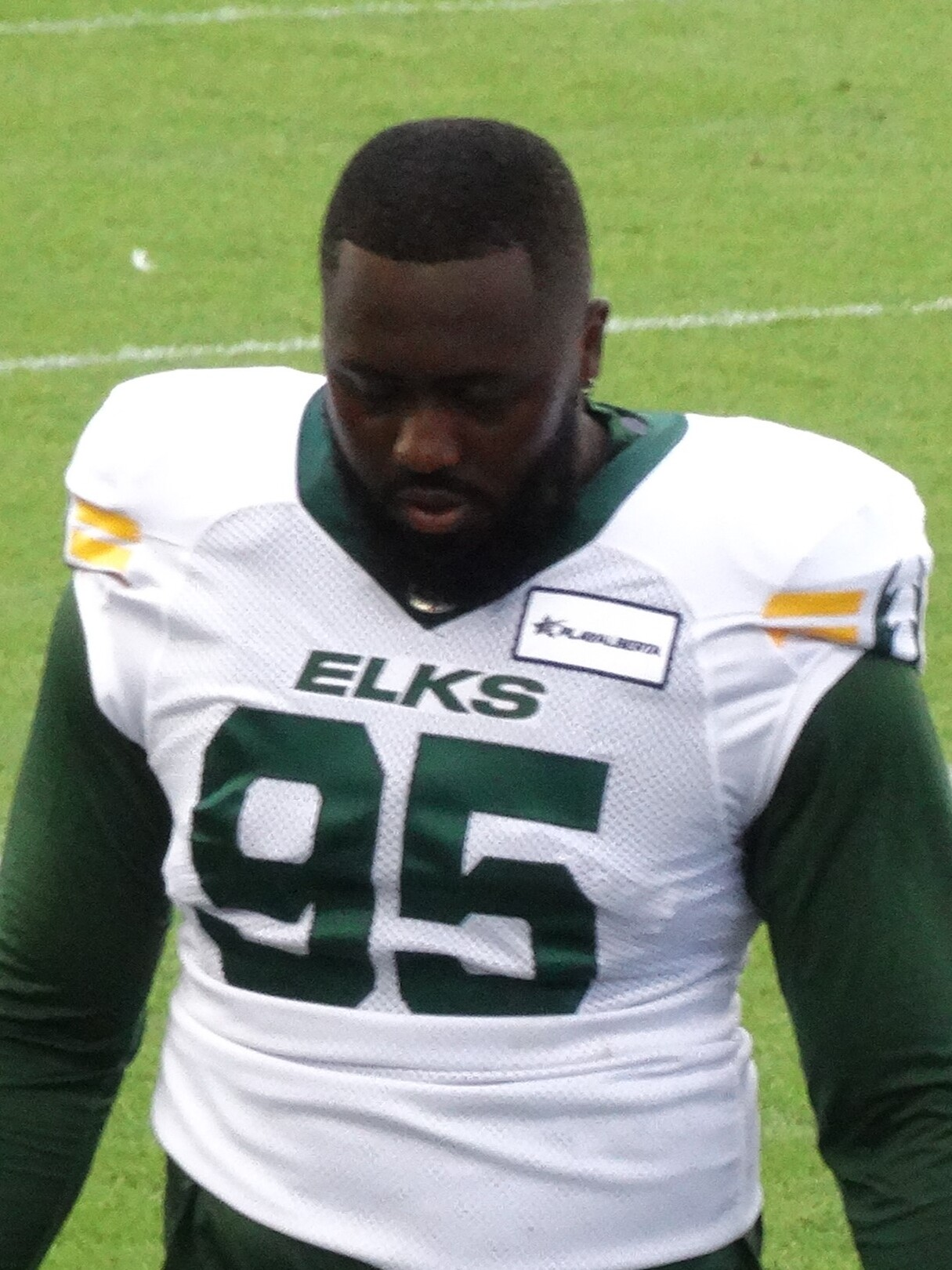
- Acheampong with the Edmonton Elks in 2024

Profile
- Position: Defensive lineman

Personal information
- Born: January 12, 1996 (age 30); Brampton, Ontario, Canada
- Listed height: 6 ft 5 in (1.96 m)
- Listed weight: 270 lb (122 kg)

Career information
- University: Wilfrid Laurier
- CFL draft: 2020: 2nd round, 20th overall pick

Career history
- 2021–2023: Toronto Argonauts
- 2023–2025: Edmonton Elks

Awards and highlights
- Grey Cup champion (2022)
- Stats at CFL.ca

Samuel Acheampong (born January 12, 1996) is a Canadian professional football defensive lineman. He has played for the Toronto Argonauts and Edmonton Elks of the Canadian Football League (CFL).

== University career ==
Acheampong attended Wilfrid Laurier University from 2015 to 2019 and played for the Golden Hawks, while being named a First Team OUA All-Star in his final year.

== Professional career ==
=== Toronto Argonauts ===
Acheampong was selected 20th overall by the Toronto Argonauts in the second round of the 2020 CFL draft. After the cancellation of the 2020 CFL season, he signed with the team on March 22, 2021. He made the team's active roster following training camp in 2021 and played in his first professional game on August 7, 2021. Acheampong recorded his first career sack and a blocked field goal attempt in a Week 13 playoff-clinching win over the BC Lions on October 30, 2021. He played in all 14 regular season games in 2021 where he had 16 defensive tackles and two sacks.

In 2022, Acheampong played in 16 regular season games where he recorded 19 defensive tackles, one special teams tackle, and one sack. He played in both the East Final and 109th Grey Cup and won his first Grey Cup championship following the Argonauts' victory over the Winnipeg Blue Bombers. To start the 2023 season, Acheampong played in one of the team's first three games while being a healthy scratch for the other two.

=== Edmonton Elks ===
On July 8, 2023, Acheampong was traded to the Edmonton Elks in exchange for a fifth-round selection in the 2024 CFL draft and the rights to Xavier Gipson. He played in 12 regular season games, starting in four, where he had 15 defensive tackles and one sack. In 2024, Acheampong played in the first six games of the regular season, recording eight defensive tackles, before suffering a season-ending injury and sitting out for the rest of the year. He was released during training camp in the following season on May 23, 2025.

== Personal life ==
Acheampong was born in Brampton, Ontario and started playing football in grade 9.
