= Trevor Hoyte =

Trevor Hoyte may refer to:

- Trevor Hoyte (athlete) (born 1957), English former sprinter
- Trevor Hoyte (Canadian football) (born 1998), Canadian football player
