= Jack Cassar =

Canadian gridiron football player (born 1997)

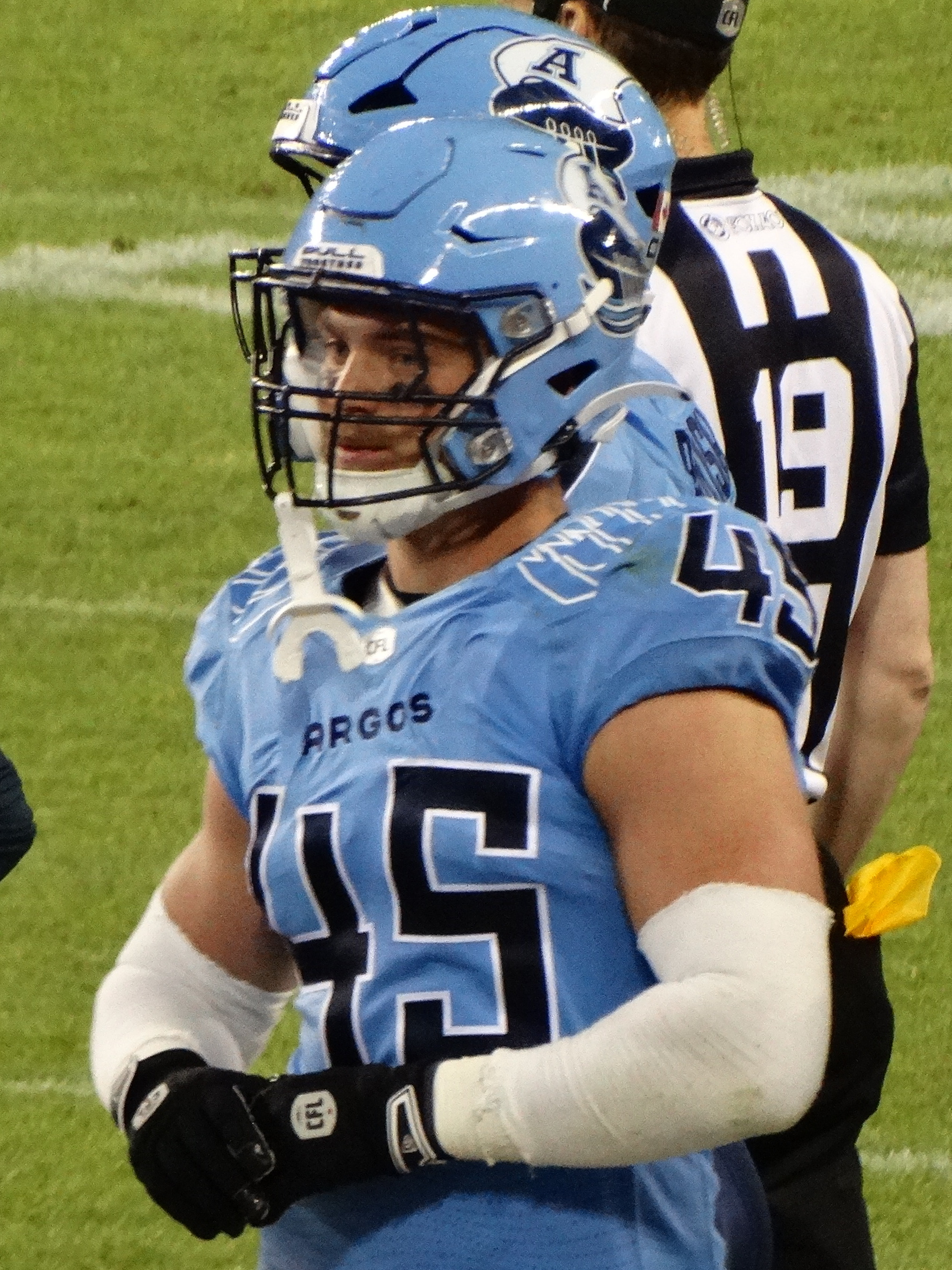
- Cassar with the Toronto Argonauts in 2024

No. 45 – Toronto Argonauts
- Positions: Fullback, Linebacker
- Roster status: Active
- CFL status: National

Personal information
- Born: January 19, 1997 (age 29); Mississauga, Ontario, Canada
- Listed height: 6 ft 4 in (1.93 m)
- Listed weight: 240 lb (109 kg)

Career information
- High school: Canada Prep Academy; Lorne Park Secondary
- University: Carleton
- CFL draft: 2020: 2nd round, 11th overall pick

Career history
- 2021–present: Toronto Argonauts

Awards and highlights
- 2× Grey Cup champion (2022, 2024); First-team All-Canadian (2019)
- Stats at CFL.ca

Jack Cassar (born January 19, 1997) is a Canadian professional football fullback and linebacker for the Toronto Argonauts of the Canadian Football League (CFL). He is a two-time Grey Cup champion after winning with the Argonauts in 2022 and 2024.

== University career ==
Cassar played U Sports football for the Carleton Ravens from 2016 to 2019. He played in 31 regular season games where he had 153.5 tackles, eight sacks, and one interception. He was named a U Sports First-team All-Canadian and the OUA Stand-up Defensive Player of the Year in 2019 as he played in seven games where he had 44 tackles, four sacks, seven tackles for a loss, and one fumble recovery.

== Professional career ==
Cassar was drafted in the second round, 11th overall, in the 2020 CFL draft by the Toronto Argonauts, but did not play in 2020 due to the cancellation of the 2020 CFL season. He then signed with the team on March 25, 2021. Cassar made the team following training camp and played in his first career professional game on August 7, 2021, against the Calgary Stampeders. However, he suffered a hip injury in that game and was placed on the team's six-game injured list. He returned to play on October 6, 2021, against the Ottawa Redblacks, where he earned his first professional start at middle linebacker, in just his second professional game. Cassar played in eight regular season games in 2021 where he had two defensive tackles and nine special teams tackles. He also made his post-season debut that year in the team's East Final loss to the Hamilton Tiger-Cats.

In 2022, Cassar played in 12 regular season games, starting in one, where he had 11 defensive tackles, a team-leading 19 special teams tackles, one forced fumble, and one fumble recovery. He played in both of the team's post-season games, including his first Grey Cup appearance, where he recorded three special teams tackles in the 109th Grey Cup victory over the Winnipeg Blue Bombers. In the 2023 season, Cassar played in all 18 regular season games where he had two defensive tackles, 14 special teams tackles, and three fumble recoveries.

In 2024, Cassar tied for the league lead in special teams tackles with 22, where he played in 18 regular season games and also recorded six defensive tackles. He played in all three post-season games, including the 111th Grey Cup where he had one fumble recovery in the Argonauts' 41–24 victory over the Winnipeg Blue Bombers. In the 2025 season, Cassar missed six games due to injury and recorded two defensive tackles, seven special teams tackles and one forced fumble. He signed a contract extension with the team on December 22, 2025.

Cassar switched to the fullback position for the 2026 season. He scored his first career touchdown on a three-yard reception on August 29, 2026.

== Personal life ==
Cassar first played gridiron football in Dubai where he attended school from grade 5 to grade 8.
