= Isiah Cage =

American gridiron football player (born 1993)

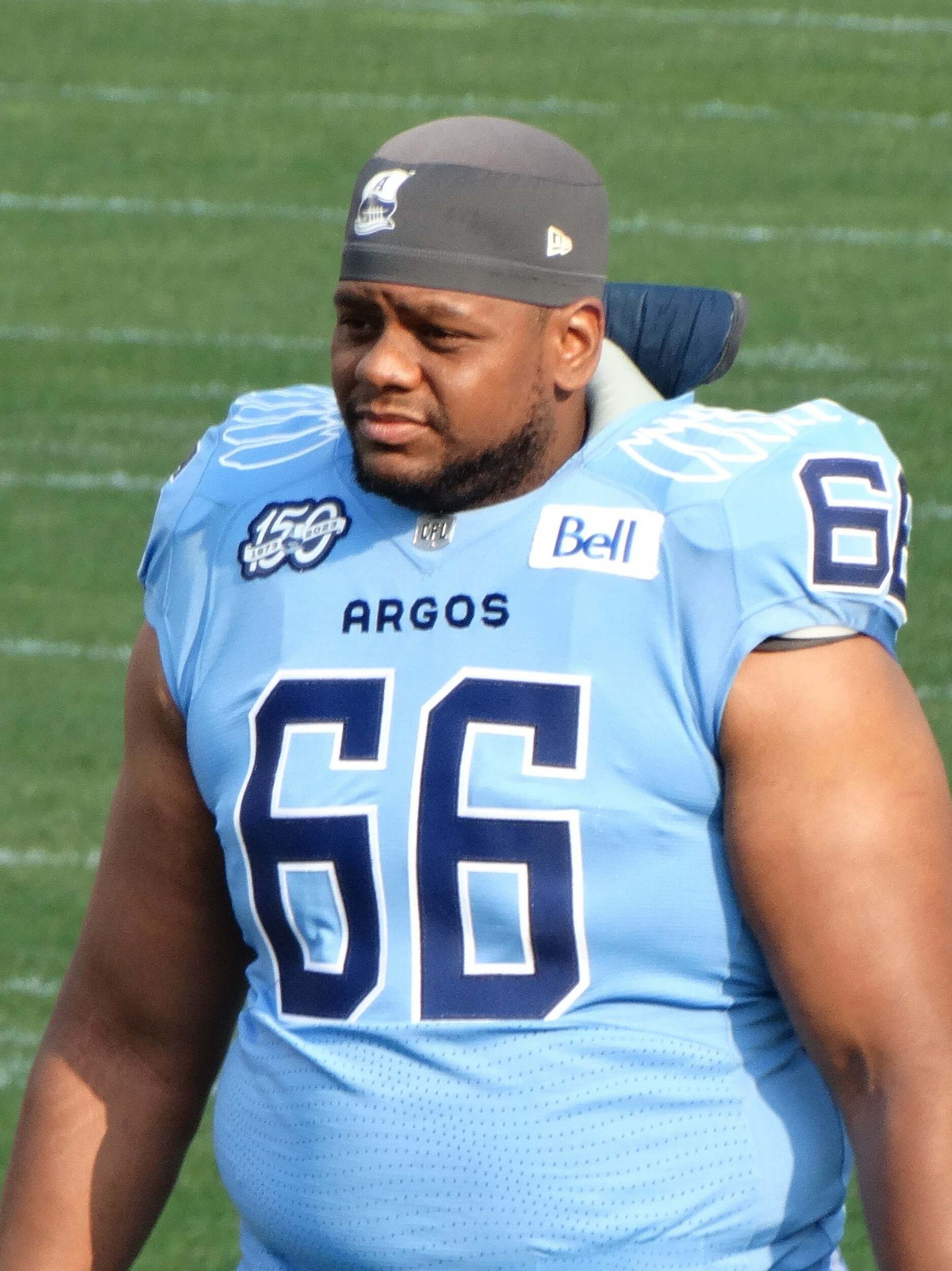
- Cage with the Toronto Argonauts in 2023

No. 55 – BC Lions
- Position: Offensive tackle
- Roster status: Active
- CFL status: American

Personal information
- Born: August 26, 1993 (age 33); Chicago, Illinois, U.S.
- Listed height: 6 ft 4 in (1.93 m)
- Listed weight: 312 lb (142 kg)

Career information
- High school: Percy L. Julian High
- College: Wisconsin–Eau Claire; Concordia (Saint Paul)

Career history
- 2016: Indianapolis Colts
- 2018–2024: Toronto Argonauts
- 2026–present: BC Lions

Awards and highlights
- 2× Grey Cup champion (2022, 2024)
- Stats at Pro Football Reference
- Stats at CFL.ca

Isiah Cage (born August 26, 1993) is an American professional football offensive tackle for the BC Lions of the Canadian Football League (CFL).

== College career ==
Cage played college football for the Concordia Golden Bears for two seasons before transferring to play for the Wisconsin–Eau Claire Blugolds.

== Professional career ==
Pre-draft measurables
| Height | Weight | Arm length | Hand span | Wingspan | 40-yard dash | 10-yard split | 20-yard split | 20-yard shuttle | Three-cone drill | Vertical jump | Broad jump | Bench press |
|---|---|---|---|---|---|---|---|---|---|---|---|---|
| 6 ft 3 1/2 in (1.92 m) | 313 lb (142 kg) | 33 1/2 in (0.85 m) | 9 1/8 in (0.23 m) | 6 ft 8 1/2 in (2.04 m) | 5.28 s | 1.80 s | 2.94 s | 5.30 s | 8.08 s | 28.0 in (0.71 m) | 8 ft 3 in (2.51 m) | 26 reps |
All values from Pro Day

=== Indianapolis Colts ===
Cage originally signed with the Indianapolis Colts of the National Football League (NFL) on May 2, 2016, but spent the entire 2016 season on the injured list with an unspecified injury. He was later released on May 3, 2017.

=== Toronto Argonauts ===
Cage spent 2017 out of football and was considering other career options, when he discussed the CFL in-depth with former BC Lions offensive tackle Jovan Olafioye. He subsequently signed with the Toronto Argonauts as a free agent on May 21, 2018. He spent most of the 2018 season on the practice roster before playing in and starting his first career professional game on October 12, 2018. He started the final four games of the 2018 season at left tackle.

In 2019, Cage played and started in seven regular season games before suffering a season-ending injury in the Touchdown Atlantic game on August 25, 2019, against the Montreal Alouettes in Moncton, New Brunswick. He did not play in 2020 due to the cancellation of the 2020 CFL season. During 2021 training camp, Cage injured his ankle and was sidelined for the entire season on the injured list.

Just prior to the 2022 season opener, Cage slipped in the shower and suffered a concussion and missed the first three games of the regular season. After not playing in a game for nearly three years since the 2019 Touchdown Atlantic game, Cage returned to play in the 2022 Touchdown Atlantic game in Wolfville, Nova Scotia, on July 16, 2022. However, he was injured again and only played in two regular season games in 2022 and was on the injured list when the Argonauts won the 109th Grey Cup.

In 2023, Cage played and started in ten regular season games and also played in his first career playoff game, but the Argonauts lost to the Montreal Alouettes in the East Final. In the 2024 season, Cage played and started the first 14 regular season games before suffering an injury and was out for the rest of the year. He was again on the injured list and the Argonauts won another Grey Cup over the Winnipeg Blue Bombers in the 111th Grey Cup game. As an impending free agent, Cage was granted an early release on February 10, 2025.

=== BC Lions ===
On February 2, 2026, Cage signed a contract with the BC Lions. On June 12, 2026, Cage was placed on the Lions' 6-game injured list where he remained for the entire 2026 CFL season.
