= Eli Mencer =

American gridiron football player (born 1996)

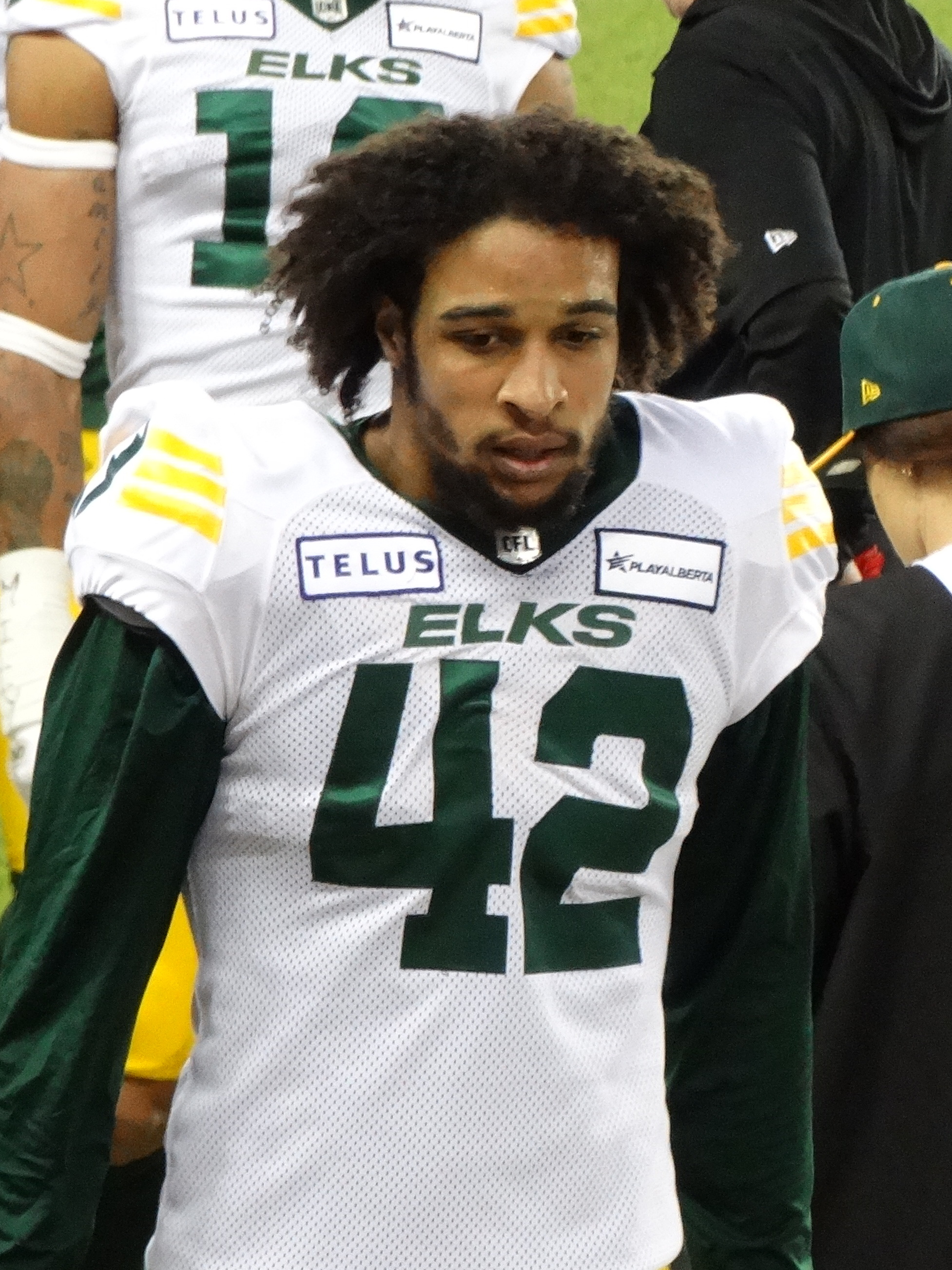
- Mencer with the Edmonton Elks in 2023

Profile
- Positions: Defensive lineman, linebacker

Personal information
- Born: November 14, 1996 (age 29); Altoona, Pennsylvania, U.S.
- Listed height: 5 ft 11 in (1.80 m)
- Listed weight: 270 lb (122 kg)

Career information
- High school: Altoona Area High
- College: Albany

Career history
- 2020: Seattle Seahawks*
- 2021: Montreal Alouettes*
- 2021–2022: Toronto Argonauts
- 2023: Edmonton Elks
- * Offseason or practice squad member only

Awards and highlights
- Grey Cup champion (2022)
- Stats at Pro Football Reference
- Stats at CFL.ca

Eli Mencer (born November 14, 1996) is an American professional football defensive lineman and linebacker. He previously played in the Canadian Football League (CFL) for the Toronto Argonauts and Edmonton Elks.

== College career ==
After using a redshirt season in 2015, Mencer played college football for the Albany Great Danes as a linebacker from 2016 to 2019. He played in 45 games where he had 198 tackles, 21.5 sacks, two interceptions, 12 forced fumbles, and eight fumble recoveries.

== Professional career ==
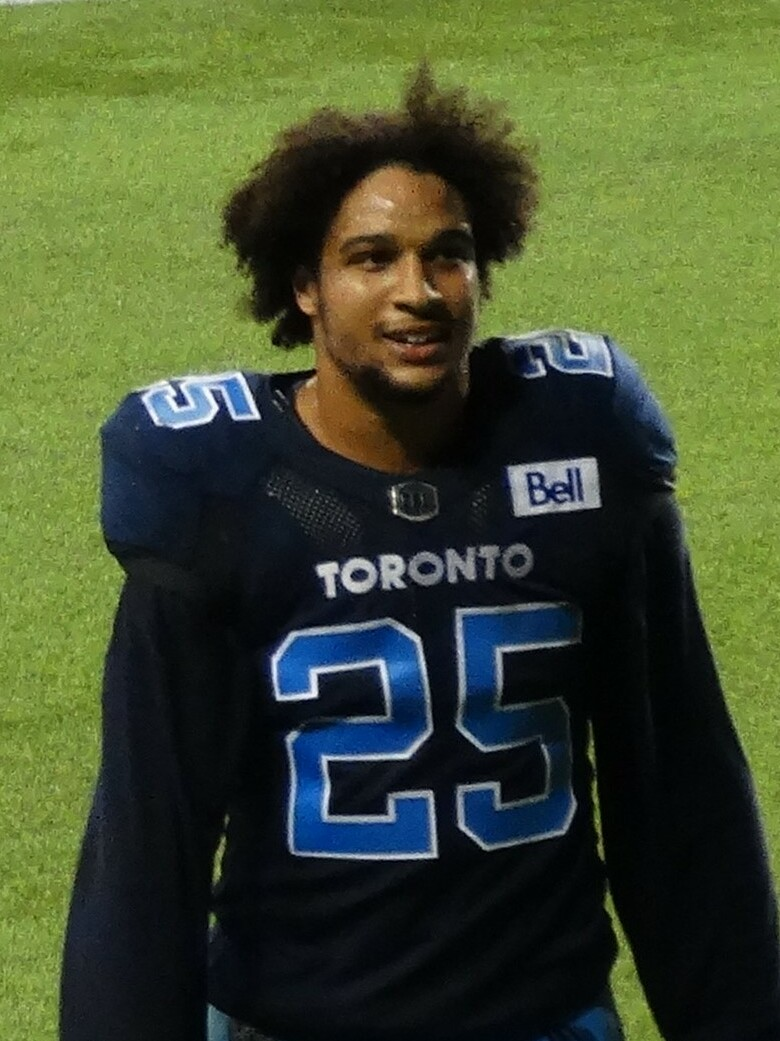
Mencer with the Toronto Argonauts in 2021

=== Seattle Seahawks ===
On April 25, 2020, Mencer signed with the Seattle Seahawks after going undrafted in the 2020 NFL draft. He was released late in the preseason on August 29, 2020, to make room for Paul Richardson, who was also released one week later.

=== Montreal Alouettes ===
Mencer signed with the Montreal Alouettes on January 21, 2021. However, he was released prior to training camp in the pandemic-shortened 2021 CFL season, on June 21, 2021.

=== Toronto Argonauts ===
One day after his Montreal release, on June 22, 2021, Mencer was signed by the Toronto Argonauts. Following 2021 training camp, he was assigned to the practice roster, but made his professional debut in week 2, on August 13, 2021, against the Winnipeg Blue Bombers, where he had three special teams tackles. He recorded his first career interception on October 6, 2021, against the Ottawa Redblacks. He played in just six regular season games that year, but led the team in special teams tackles with 10.

To start the 2022 season, Mencer was on the injured list and then the practice roster before dressing as a backup linebacker in week three.

=== Edmonton Elks ===
Mencer signed with the Edmonton Elks on December 15, 2022. He dressed in four games for the team during the 2023 season. He was released on October 20, 2023.

== Personal life ==
Mencer was born to Lori Alderman and has three siblings, Reggie, Joey, and Jina.
