= Brandon Calver =

Canadian gridiron football player (born 1993)

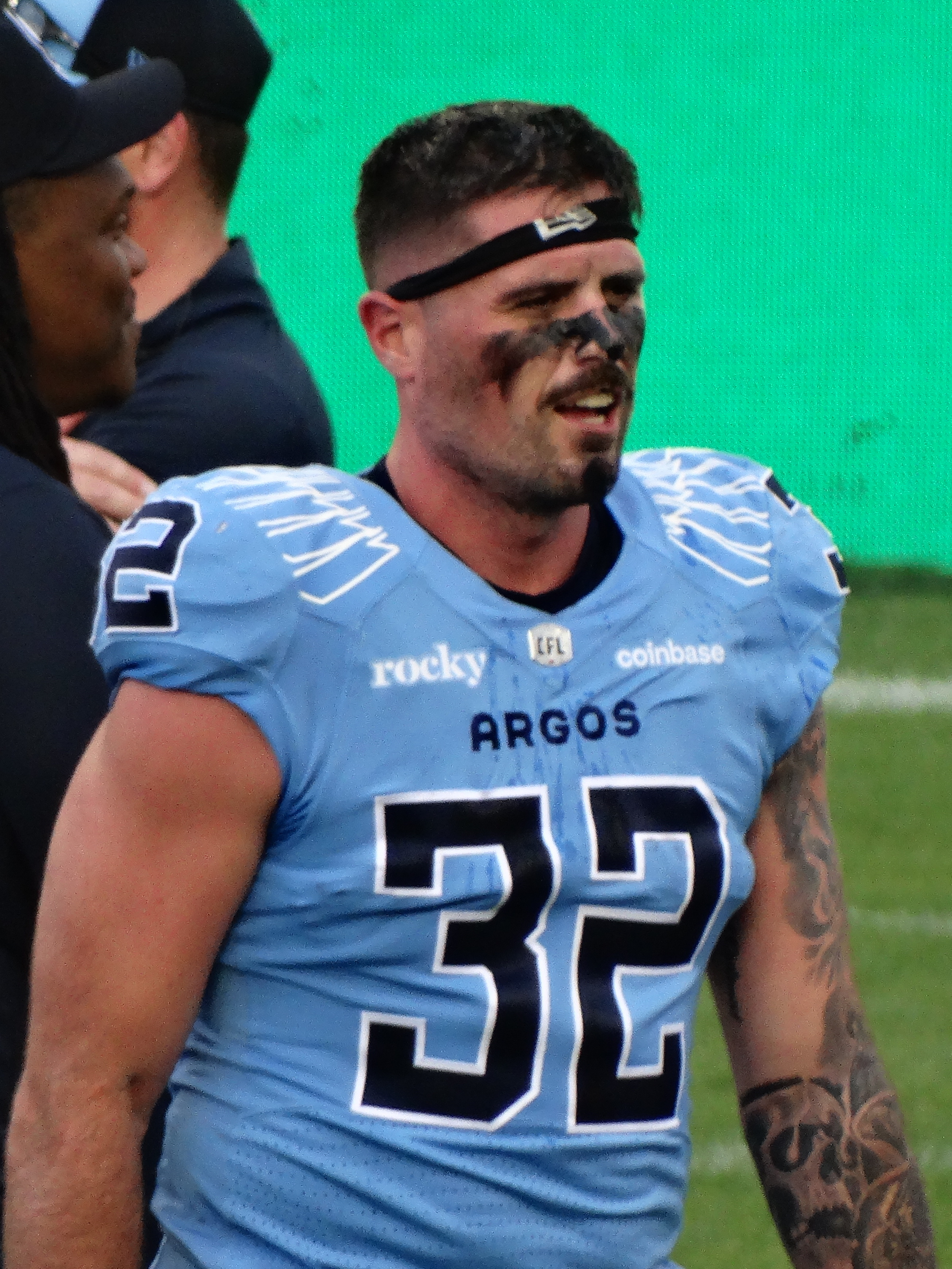
- Calver with the Toronto Argonauts in 2025

Profile
- Position: Fullback

Personal information
- Born: April 17, 1993 (age 33); London, Ontario, Canada
- Listed height: 6 ft 3 in (1.91 m)
- Listed weight: 220 lb (100 kg)

Career information
- High school: A. B. Lucas Secondary
- University: Wilfrid Laurier
- CFL draft: 2017: undrafted

Career history
- 2018–2019: Montreal Alouettes
- 2019: Ottawa Redblacks
- 2019–2020: Winnipeg Blue Bombers
- 2021–2025: Toronto Argonauts

Awards and highlights
- 3× Grey Cup champion (2019, 2022, 2024)
- Stats at CFL.ca

Brandon Calver (born April 17, 1993) is a Canadian professional football fullback. He most recently played for the Toronto Argonauts of the Canadian Football League (CFL). He is a three-time Grey Cup champion after winning with the Winnipeg Blue Bombers in 2019 and with the Argonauts in 2022 and 2024.

== University career ==
Calver played U Sports football for the Wilfrid Laurier Golden Hawks from 2013 to 2017. He played in 36 regular season games where he had 210.5 tackles, 11.5 sacks, four forced fumbles, six fumble recoveries, and one interception. He won a Yates Cup championship with the Golden Hawks in 2016.

== Professional career ==
=== Montreal Alouettes ===
While eligible for the 2017 CFL draft, Calver was not drafted and finished his university eligibility with the Golden Hawks in 2017. On January 22, 2018, it was announced that he had signed with the Montreal Alouettes as an undrafted free agent. Calver made the team's active roster following training camp and played in his first professional game on June 16, 2018, against the BC Lions, where he recorded one special teams tackle. He played in 17 regular season games that year where he had nine special teams tackles and one forced fumble.

In 2019, he played in five of the team's first six games of the season and recorded four special teams tackles. However, after the team signed fellow linebacker, Frédéric Plesius, Calver was released on August 5, 2019.

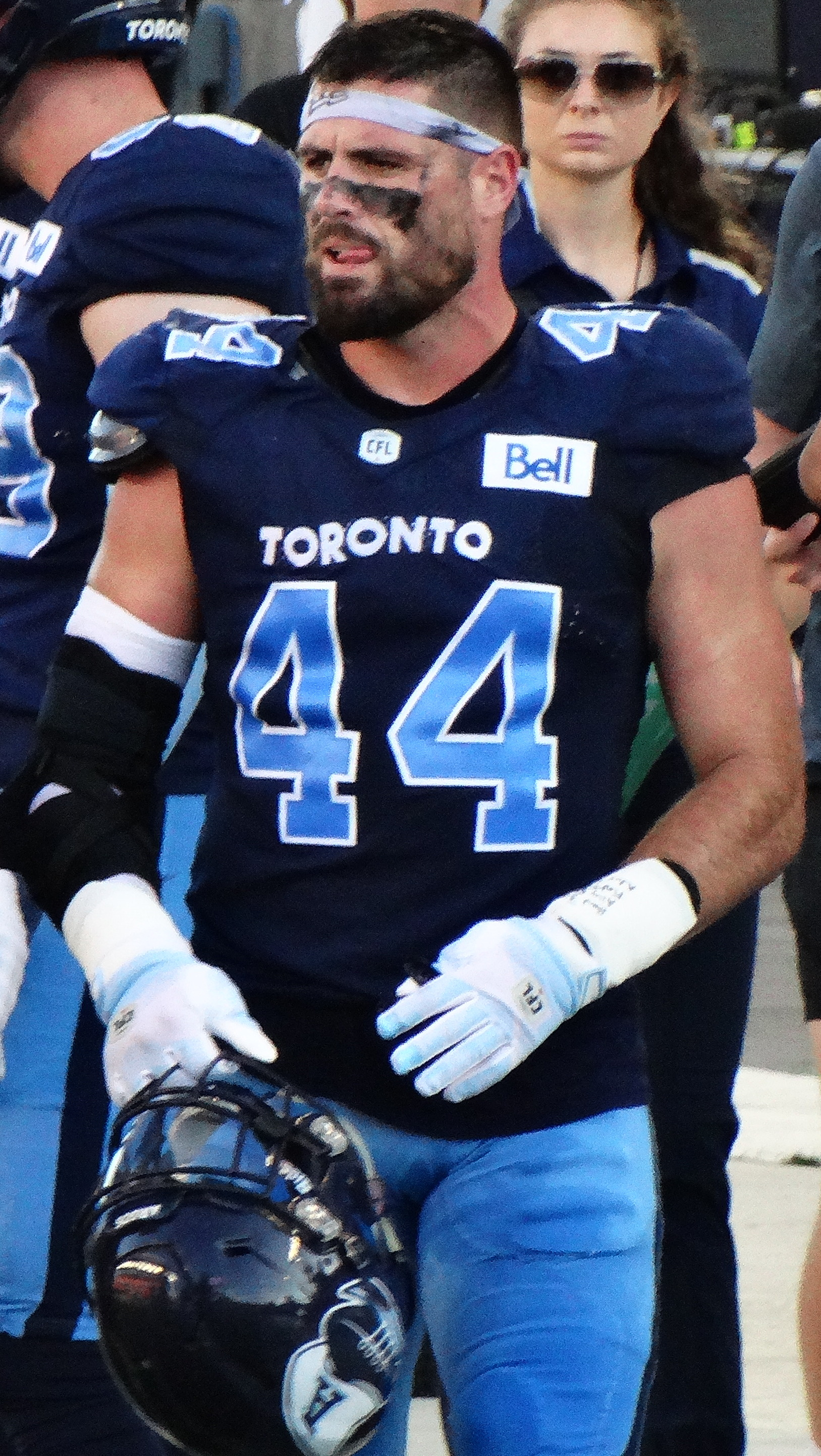
Calver with the Argonauts in 2022

=== Ottawa Redblacks ===
On August 20, 2019, Calver signed with the Ottawa Redblacks to a practice roster agreement. He played in one game for the Redblacks, on August 24, 2019, against the Saskatchewan Roughriders, but was then released on August 31, 2019.

=== Winnipeg Blue Bombers ===
Soon after his release from Ottawa, Calver signed a practice roster agreement with the Winnipeg Blue Bombers on September 6, 2019. He played in the team's last five regular season games, but did not record a statistic. He did, however, record one special teams tackle in his playoff debut in the team's West Semi-Final win over the Calgary Stampeders. He was on the injured list for the West Final and Grey Cup games, but was still a member of the 107th Grey Cup championship team.

Calver remained under contract with the Blue Bombers in 2020, but did not play that year due to the cancellation of the 2020 CFL season. He became a free agent upon the expiration of his contract on February 9, 2021.

=== Toronto Argonauts ===
Calver remained unsigned to start the 2021 CFL season, but was signed in week 2 by the Toronto Argonauts on August 10, 2021. He played in six regular season games in 2021, but did not record any statistics.

In 2022, Calver played in 17 regular season games where he had six special teams tackles. Midway through the year, he changed positions from linebacker to fullback. He also played in both post-season games that year, including the 109th Grey Cup game where he won his second championship after the Argonauts defeated his former team, the Blue Bombers. He signed a contract extension on December 28, 2022.

Calver recorded a career-high 10 special teams tackles in 2023 while playing in 16 regular season games. He played in the East Final, but the 16–2 Argonauts were upset by the Montreal Alouettes. In the 2024 season, Calver spent the first two games on the practice roster, but dressed for the following nine, before being placed on the injured list. He recorded four special teams tackles during the regular season and was on the six-game injured list when the Argonauts defeated the Blue Bombers in the 111th Grey Cup championship. As an impending free agent, Calver was granted an early release on February 10, 2025. However, he was re-signed on June 19, 2025. He played in six games for the Argonauts in 2025 where he had three special teams tackles. He was later released on August 11, 2025.
