= Trevon Tate =

American gridiron football player (born 1994)

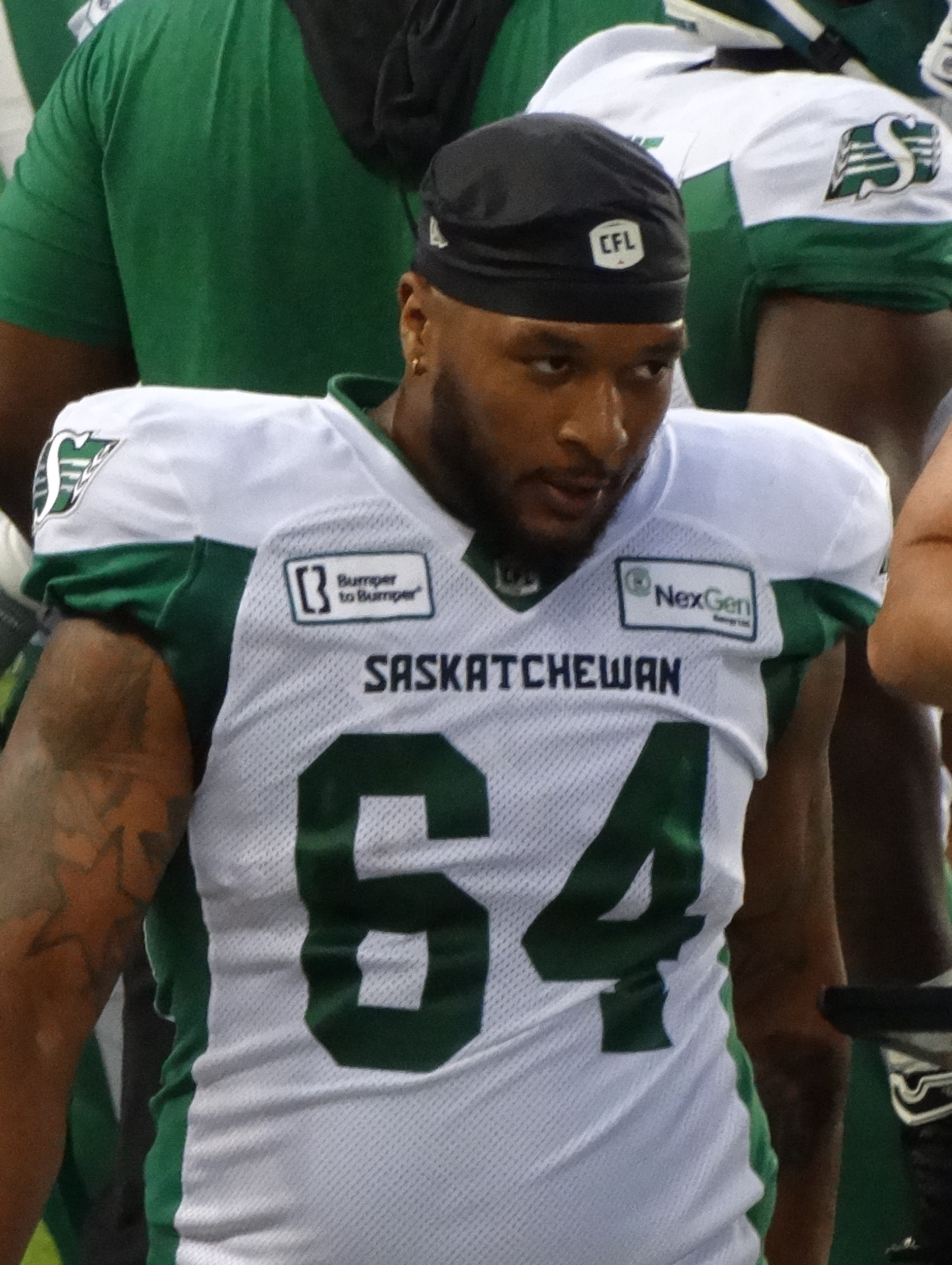
- Tate with the Saskatchewan Roughriders in 2024

Profile
- Position: Offensive tackle

Personal information
- Born: March 13, 1996 (age 30); Channelview, Texas, U.S.
- Listed height: 6 ft 4 in (1.93 m)
- Listed weight: 295 lb (134 kg)

Career information
- High school: North Shore High (TX)
- College: Memphis
- NFL draft: 2019: undrafted

Career history
- Cleveland Browns (2019)*; Hamilton Tiger-Cats (2019–2021); Toronto Argonauts (2021)*; Ottawa Redblacks (2021); Toronto Argonauts (2021–2023); Calgary Stampeders (2024); Saskatchewan Roughriders (2024–2025)
- * Offseason or practice squad member only

Awards and highlights
- 2× Grey Cup champion (2022, 2025); First-team All-AAC (2017)
- Stats at CFL.ca

Trevon Tate (born March 13, 1996) is an American professional football offensive tackle.

== College career ==
After using a redshirt season in 2014, Tate played college football for the Memphis Tigers from 2015 to 2018.

== Professional career ==
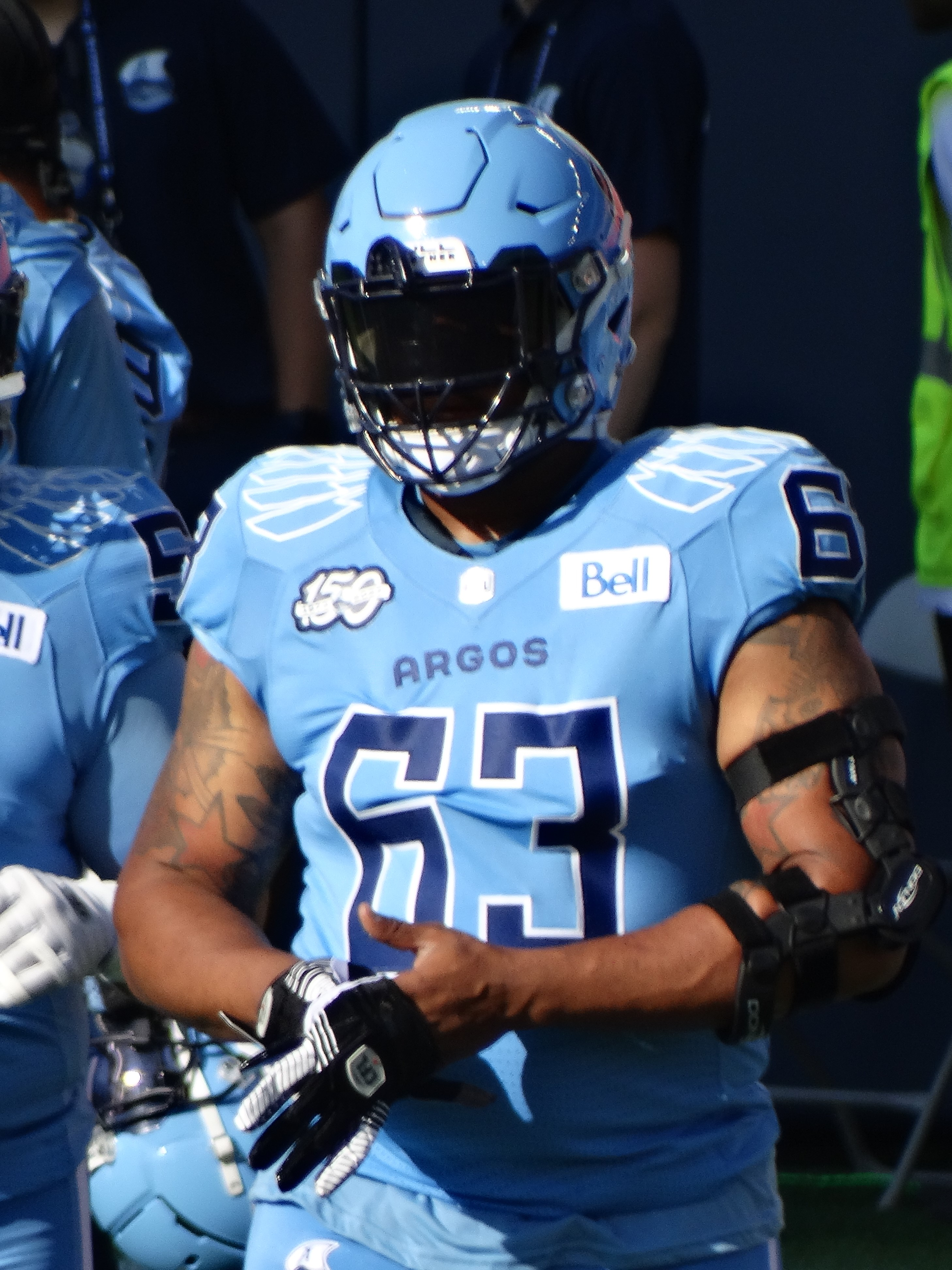
Tate with the Toronto Argonauts in 2023

Pre-draft measurables
Height	Weight	Arm length	Hand span	40-yard dash	10-yard split	20-yard split	20-yard shuttle	Three-cone drill	Vertical jump	Broad jump	Bench press
6 ft 2 1/2 in (1.89 m)	293 lb (133 kg)	32 3/8 in (0.82 m)	9 5/8 in (0.24 m)	5.26 s	1.78 s	3.01 s	4.80 s	7.73 s	28.5 in (0.72 m)	9 ft 0 in (2.74 m)	22 reps
All values from NFL Combine/Pro Day

=== Cleveland Browns ===
Tate signed with the Cleveland Browns as an undrafted free agent on May 3, 2019. However, he was waived on May 28, 2019.

=== Hamilton Tiger-Cats ===
On June 21, 2019, Tate signed a practice roster agreement with the Hamilton Tiger-Cats. He made his professional debut in the final game of the regular season on November 2, 2019, against the Toronto Argonauts. He did not play in 2020 due to the cancellation of the 2020 CFL season.

Tate started at left tackle in the first game of the 2021 season before being transferred to the injured list. He was then released on August 21, 2021.

=== Toronto Argonauts (first stint) ===
Shortly after his Hamilton release, Tate signed a practice roster agreement with the Toronto Argonauts on August 26, 2021.

=== Ottawa Redblacks ===
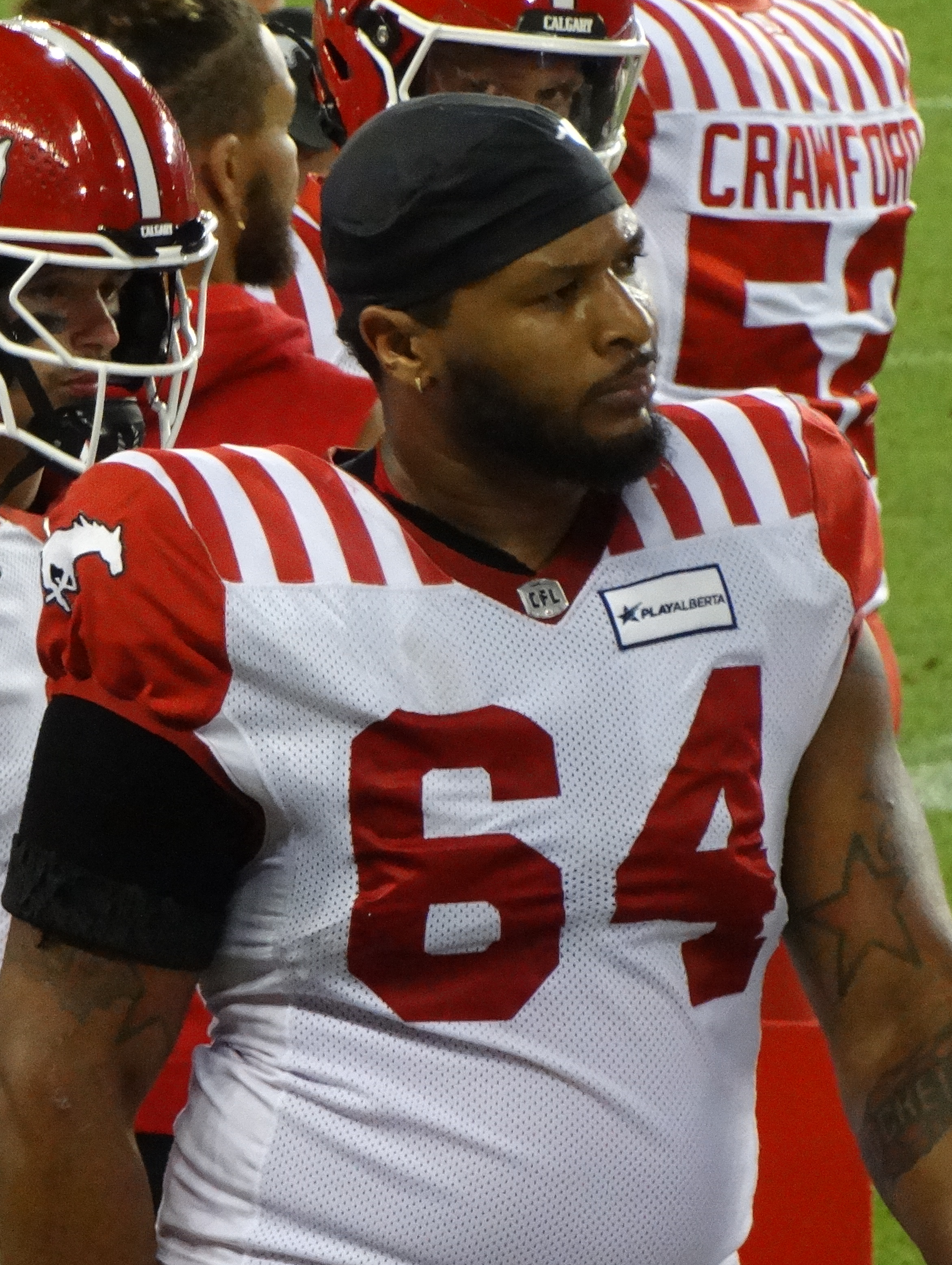
Tate with the Calgary Stampeders in 2024

Due to 2021 rules regarding possible pandemic limitations, the Ottawa Redblacks claimed Tate from Toronto's practice roster on September 19, 2021, to play for the team temporarily. He played at left tackle for the team's game against the Edmonton Elks on September 28, 2021, and then had his rights reverted to the Argonauts shortly thereafter.

=== Toronto Argonauts (second stint) ===
After playing one game for the Redblacks, Tate re-joined the Argonauts on September 30, 2021. He played in four regular season games for the team to end the 2021 season, including against the Tiger-Cats and Redblacks, who he had played for earlier in the year. He played and started in four games in 2022. He was on the six-game injured list when the Argonauts won the 109th Grey Cup.

In 2023, Tate started ten games, including eight at left tackle and two at right tackle. He became a free agent upon the expiry of his contract on February 13, 2024.

=== Calgary Stampeders ===
On February 13, 2024, it was announced that Tate had signed with the Calgary Stampeders. He played in four games in 2024, but was released on August 13, 2024.

=== Saskatchewan Roughriders ===
Tate signed with the Saskatchewan Roughriders on August 19, 2024. He became a free agent after the 2025 season.

== Personal life ==
Tate was born in Channelview, Texas to parents Paula Thomas-Smith and Gilbert Smith. He has two siblings, Melicia Terrell and LaKena Smith.
