= 2023 Toronto Argonauts season =

CFL team season

- Argonauts 150th Anniversary Logo
- General manager: Michael Clemons
- President: Bill Manning
- Head coach: Ryan Dinwiddie
- Home stadium: BMO Field

Results
- Record: 16–2
- Division place: 1st, East
- Playoffs: Lost East Final
- Team MOP: Chad Kelly
- Team MODP: Adarius Pickett
- Team MOC: Royce Metchie
- Team MOOL: Dejon Allen
- Team MOST: Javon Leake
- Team MOR: Qwan'tez Stiggers

Uniform
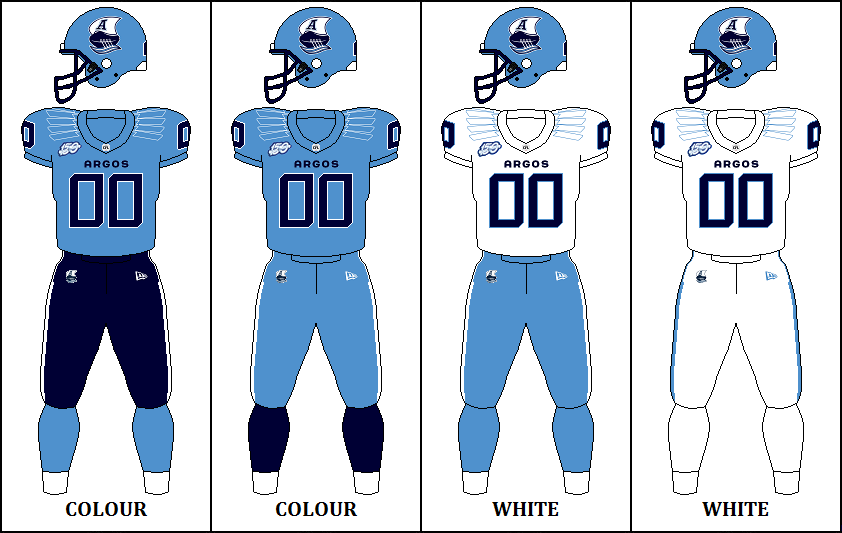

The 2023 Toronto Argonauts season was the 65th season for the team in the Canadian Football League (CFL) and their 150th year of existence. The Argonauts entered the season as defending champions following their victory in the 109th Grey Cup. The team attempted to win their league-leading 19th Grey Cup championship, but were defeated by the Montreal Alouettes in the East Final.

The Argonauts qualified for the playoffs for a third consecutive season following their week 11 victory over the Montreal Alouettes. In the following week, on September 15, 2023, the Argonauts defeated the Alouettes again to secure first place in the division for the third straight year, which was the first time since 1982–1984 that the franchise captured three straight division titles. The team also started the season with an 11–1 record which was the best start to a season in franchise history. The Argonauts also set a CFL record as the earliest to clinch a first-place finish with six games remaining in an 18-game schedule. The previous record was held by the 2009 Montreal Alouettes, who clinched first place in the East Division with five games remaining. In the final game of the regular season, the Argonauts won their 16th game, tying the 1989 Edmonton Eskimos for the CFL record for most wins in a regular season. However, their season came to a shocking end as they were upset by the Montreal Alouettes in the East Final.

The 2023 CFL season was the third season for head coach Ryan Dinwiddie and the fourth season for Michael Clemons as general manager. The team held their training camp at the University of Guelph for the second consecutive season.

== Offseason ==
=== CFL global draft ===
The 2023 CFL global draft took place on May 2, 2023. The Argonauts had the last selection in each of the two rounds after winning the 109th Grey Cup.

Round	Pick	Player	Position	Club/School	Nationality
1	9	Alfredo Gachuz Lozada	K	ITESM CEM	Mexico
2	18	Emmanuel Falola	LB	Bristol Aztecs	(United Kingdom) Great Britain

== CFL national draft ==
The 2023 CFL draft took place on May 2, 2023. The Argonauts had eight selections in the eight-round draft after acquiring an additional sixth round pick from the Edmonton Elks after trading Jalen Collins and Martez Ivey, but trading their first-round pick to the BC Lions for Jordan Williams. The team had the ninth selection in each of the eight rounds of the draft (not including forfeited picks by other teams or traded picks) after winning the 109th Grey Cup.

Round	Pick	Player	Position	School	Hometown
2	16	Jared Wayne	WR	Pittsburgh	Peterborough, ON
3	27	Adam Guillemette	LS	Holy Cross	Cambridge, ON
4	36	Spencer Nichols	RB	Western Ontario	London, ON
5	45	Edouard Paradis	OL	Houston Christian	Lévis, QC
6	47	Richard Burton	WR	Queen's	Ottawa, ON
6	54	Ife Onyemenam	LB	Wilfrid Laurier	Etobicoke, ON
7	63	Brendan Murphy	DB	Western Ontario	Châteauguay, QC
8	72	Anthony Vandal	OL	Sherbrooke	Sorel, QC

== Preseason ==
The Argonauts' home preseason game was played at Alumni Stadium in Guelph, Ontario.

=== Schedule ===
Week	Game	Date	Kickoff	Opponent	Results		TV	Venue	Attendance	Summary
Week	Game	Date	Kickoff	Opponent	Score	Record	TV	Venue	Attendance	Summary
A	Bye									
B	1	Sat, May 27	4:00 p.m. EDT	at Hamilton Tiger-Cats	L 22–27	0–1	None	Tim Hortons Field	17,500	Recap
C	2	Thu, June 1	7:30 p.m. EDT	vs. Ottawa Redblacks	L 23–34	0–2	None	Alumni Stadium	2,230	Recap

# Games played with colour uniforms.

== Regular season ==
=== Standings ===
East Division
Team	GP	W	L	T	Pts	PF	PA	Div	Stk	
Toronto Argonauts	18	16	2	0	32	591	396	10–0	W4	Details
Montreal Alouettes	18	11	7	0	22	442	392	7–3	W5	Details
Hamilton Tiger-Cats	18	8	10	0	16	408	461	3–7	L2	Details
Ottawa Redblacks	18	4	14	0	8	415	507	0–10	L4	Details

=== Schedule ===
The Argonauts were the home team for a neutral site game in Halifax for the Week 8 match-up with the Saskatchewan Roughriders. This was the second consecutive year that the two teams meet in Nova Scotia and the first repeat matchup in the Touchdown Atlantic series.

Week	Game	Date	Kickoff	Opponent	Results		TV	Venue	Attendance	Summary
Week	Game	Date	Kickoff	Opponent	Score	Record	TV	Venue	Attendance	Summary
1	Bye									
2	1	Sun, June 18	7:00 p.m. EDT	vs. Hamilton Tiger-Cats	W 32–14	1–0	TSN/CBSSN	BMO Field	15,967	Recap
3	2	Sun, June 25	7:00 p.m. EDT	at Edmonton Elks	W 43–31	2–0	TSN	Commonwealth Stadium	20,817	Recap
4	3	Mon, July 3	7:00 p.m. EDT	vs. BC Lions	W 45–24	3–0	TSN/RDS/CBSSN	BMO Field	12,473	Recap
5	Bye									
6	4	Fri, July 14	7:30 p.m. EDT	at Montreal Alouettes	W 35–27	4–0	TSN/RDS	Molson Stadium	16,151	Recap
7	5	Fri, July 21	7:30 p.m. EDT	at Hamilton Tiger-Cats	W 31–15	5–0	TSN	Tim Hortons Field	24,312	Recap
8	6	Sat, July 29	4:00 p.m. EDT	Saskatchewan Roughriders	W 31–13	6–0	TSN/RDS2/CBSSN	Huskies Stadium	11,555	Recap
9	7	Fri, Aug 4	9:00 p.m. EDT	at Calgary Stampeders	L 7–20	6–1	TSN	McMahon Stadium	19,234	Recap
10	8	Sun, Aug 13	7:00 p.m. EDT	vs. Ottawa Redblacks	W 44–31	7–1	TSN/RDS	BMO Field	12,796	Recap
11	Bye									
12	9	Fri, Aug 25	7:30 p.m. EDT	vs. Calgary Stampeders	W 39–31	8–1	TSN/RDS	BMO Field	17,906	Recap
13	10	Mon, Sept 4	3:30 p.m. EDT	at Hamilton Tiger-Cats	W 41–28	9–1	TSN/RDS2/CBSSN	Tim Hortons Field	25,381	Recap
14	11	Sat, Sep 9	1:00 p.m. EDT	vs. Montreal Alouettes	W 39–10	10–1	TSN/RDS	BMO Field	14,415	Recap
15	12	Fri, Sep 15	7:00 p.m. EDT	at Montreal Alouettes	W 23–20	11–1	TSN/RDS	Molson Stadium	17,626	Recap
16	13	Sat, Sep 23	7:00 p.m. EDT	vs. Hamilton Tiger-Cats	W 29–14	12–1	TSN	BMO Field	15,549	Recap
17	14	Fri, Sep 29	8:00 p.m. EDT	at Winnipeg Blue Bombers	L 21–31	12–2	TSN/RDS	IG Field	32,343	Recap
18	15	Fri, Oct 6	7:00 p.m. EDT	vs. Edmonton Elks	W 35–12	13–2	TSN/RDS2/CBSSN	BMO Field	14,246	Recap
19	16	Sat, Oct 14	7:00 p.m. EDT	vs. Ottawa Redblacks	W 40–27	14–2	TSN/RDS2	BMO Field	13,888	Recap
20	17	Sat, Oct 21	4:00 p.m. EDT	at Saskatchewan Roughriders	W 29–26	15–2	TSN	Mosaic Stadium	24,158	Recap
21	18	Sat, Oct 28	7:00 p.m. EDT	at Ottawa Redblacks	W 27–22	16–2	TSN/RDS	TD Place Stadium	18,742	Recap

# Games played with colour uniforms.
# Games played with white uniforms.

== Post-season ==
=== Schedule ===
Game	Date	Kickoff	Opponent	Results		TV	Venue	Attendance	Summary
Game	Date	Kickoff	Opponent	Score	Record	TV	Venue	Attendance	Summary
East Semi-Final	Sat, Nov 4	Bye							
East Final	Sat, Nov 11	3:00 p.m. EST	Montreal Alouettes	L 17–38	0–1	TSN/RDS	BMO Field	26,620	Recap

# Games played with colour uniforms.

== Roster ==
2023 Toronto Argonauts final roster
**Quarterbacks**: 3 Cameron Dukes; 12 Chad Kelly; 5 Bryan Scott; **Running backs**: 44 Brandon Calver; 33 Andrew Harris; 32 Javon Leake; 34 A. J. Ouellette; **Receivers**: 18 Dejon Brissett; 86 Damonte Coxie; 80 DaVaris Daniels; 81 Tommy Nield; 89 Cam Phillips; 17 Richie Sindani; 83 David Ungerer	**Offensive linemen**: 59 Dejon Allen T; 66 Isiah Cage T; 53 Darius Ciraco C; 64 Dylan Giffen G/T; 62 Ryan Hunter G; 67 Gregor MacKellar G; 52 Peter Nicastro G/C; **Defensive linemen**: 95 Brandon Barlow DE; 91 Jared Brinkman DT; 99 Dewayne Hendrix DT; 93 Benoit Marion DE/DT; 2 Shawn Oakman DT; 7 Folarin Orimolade DE; 40 Robbie Smith DE	**Linebackers**: 45 Jack Cassar; 26 Brian Harelimana; 43 Trevor Hoyte; 30 Jonathan Jones; 48 Wynton McManis; 1 Jordan Williams; **Defensive backs**: 41 Jonathan Edouard; 38 Jamie Harry; 20 Tarvarus McFadden; 9 Royce Metchie; 3 Jamal Peters; 6 Adarius Pickett; 28 Mason Pierce; 42 Qwan'tez Stiggers	**Special teams**: 14 Boris Bede K/P; 72 Adam Guillemette LS; 29 John Haggerty P; **Practice roster**: 16 Carlton Agudosi WR; 87 B. J. Byrd SB; 71 Emmanuel Falola LB; 37 Benjie Franklin DB; 70 Alfredo Gachuz Lozada K; 82 Jeremiah Haydel WR; 69 Aron Johnson T; 73 Spencer Nichols FB; 57 Braydon Noll C; 84 Aaron Parker WR; 36 Eric Sutton DB; 98 Tyler Williams DT	**Injured list**: 21 Daniel Adeboboye RB; 8 DaShaun Amos DB; 65 Dariusz Bladek G; 39 Maurice Carnell DB; 97 Thomas Costigan DE; 0 Robertson Daniel DB; 19 Kurleigh Gittens SB; 27 Josh Hagerty DB; 85 RaJae' Johnson SB; 92 Deionte Knight DT; 49 Daniel Kwamou LB; 24 Deonta McMahon RB; 10 Henoc Muamba LB; 23 Robert Priester DB; 68 Shane Richards T/G; 35 Tigie Sankoh DB; 63 Trevon Tate T; 46 Daniel Valente DB
Italics indicate American player • **Bold** indicates Global player

== Coaching staff ==
Toronto Argonauts staff
Front office and support staff: Owner – Maple Leaf Sports & Entertainment; President – Bill Manning; General Manager – Michael Clemons; Assistant General Manager – Vince Magri; Director of Football Operations and National Scout – Alex Russell; Head Athletic Therapist - Josh Shewell; Assistant Athletic Therapist - Mark Belmore; Equipment Manager – Danny Webb; Assistant Equipment Manager – David Sillberg; Strength and Conditioning - Usama Mujtaba; Manager, Football Media - Chris Balenovich	Head Coaches: Head Coach – Ryan Dinwiddie; Offensive coaches: Pass Game Coordinator and Receivers – Pete Costanza; Offensive Line – Kris Sweet; Quarterbacks – Mike Miller; Running backs and Quality Control – Edwin Harrison; Defensive coaches: Defensive Coordinator and Defensive Line – Corey Mace; Linebackers – Kevin Eiben; Defensive Backs – Josh Bell; Secondary – William Fields; Special teams coaches: Special Teams Coordinator – Mickey Donovan; → Coaching staff
