= Josh Hagerty =

Canadian gridiron football player (born 1998)

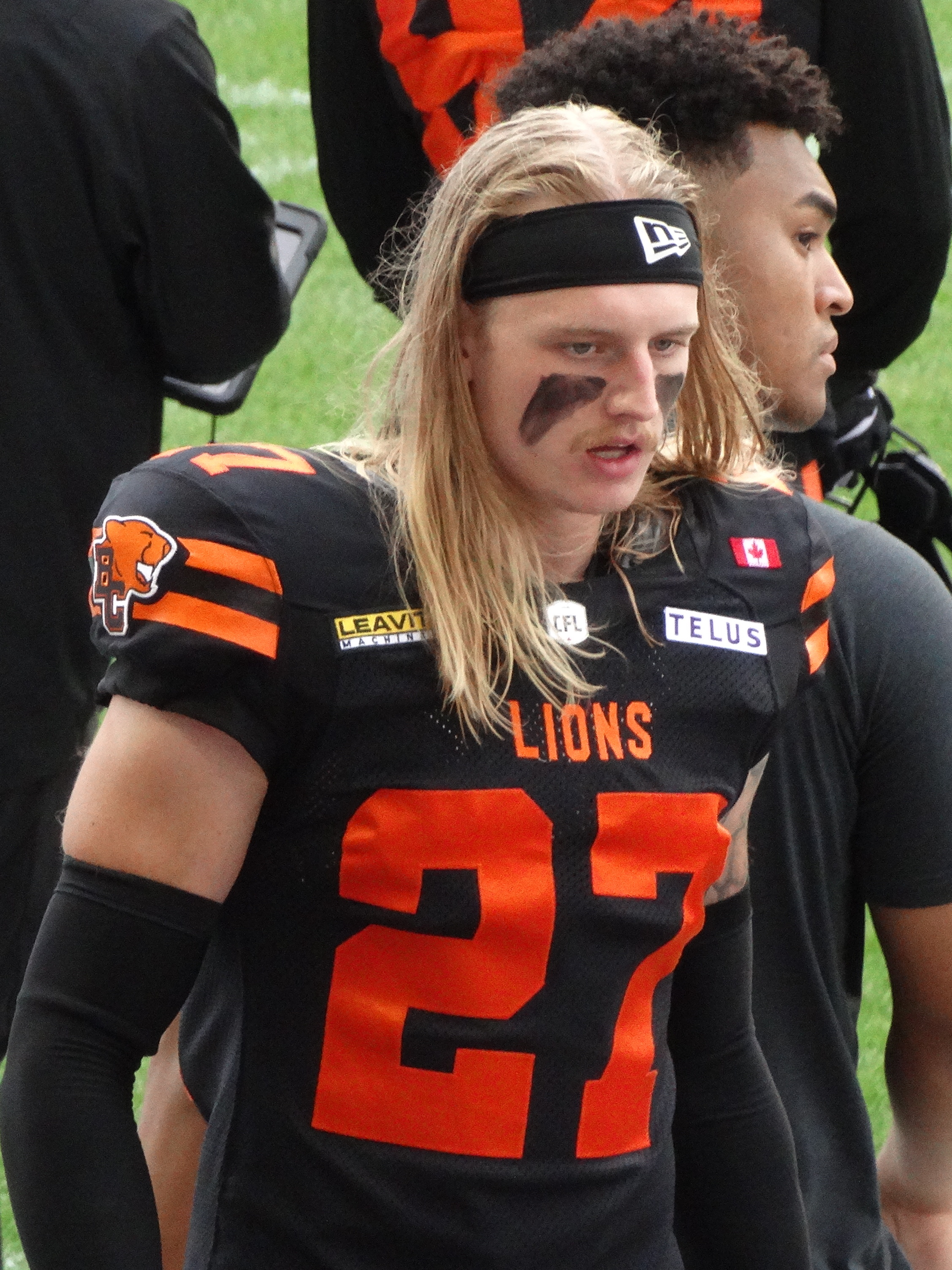
- Hagerty with the BC Lions in 2025

Profile
- Position: Defensive back

Personal information
- Born: July 27, 1998 (age 28); Regina, Saskatchewan, Canada
- Listed height: 6 ft 3 in (1.91 m)
- Listed weight: 196 lb (89 kg)

Career information
- University: Saskatchewan
- CFL draft: 2021: 6th round, 47th overall pick

Career history
- 2021–2023: Toronto Argonauts
- 2024: Edmonton Elks
- 2025: Winnipeg Blue Bombers
- 2025–2026: BC Lions

Awards and highlights
- Grey Cup champion (2022); Hardy Cup champion (2018)
- Stats at CFL.ca

Joshua Hagerty (born July 27, 1998) is a Canadian professional football defensive back.

== University career ==
Hagerty played U Sports football for the Saskatchewan Huskies from 2016 to 2020, while taking a redshirt year in 2016. He played in 26 regular season games where he had 72 tackles, four interceptions, one forced fumble, and one fumble recovery. Hagerty was a member of the 2018 Hardy Cup champion Huskies where he intercepted Adam Sinagra on the Calgary Dinos' first offensive play. He did not play in 2020 due to the cancellation of the 2020 U Sports football season and remained draft-eligible for the Canadian Football League in 2021.

== Professional career ==
Pre-draft measurables
Height	Weight	40-yard dash	20-yard shuttle	Three-cone drill	Vertical jump	Broad jump	Bench press
6 ft 3 1/2 in (1.92 m)	193.6 lb (88 kg)	4.76 s	4.23 s	7.03 s	33.5 in (0.85 m)	9 ft 9 7/8 in (2.99 m)	8 reps
All values from CFL Combine

=== Toronto Argonauts ===
Hagerty was drafted in the sixth round, 47th overall, in the 2021 CFL draft by the Toronto Argonauts and signed with the team on May 13, 2021. He made the team following training camp and played in his first career professional game on August 7, 2021, against the Calgary Stampeders. After his teammate, Crezdon Butler, suffered a concussion, Hagerty made his first career start, at safety, on September 10, 2021, against the Hamilton Tiger-Cats, where he recorded the first four defensive tackles of his career. He played in all 14 regular season games during his rookie season where he had eight defensive tackles and six special teams tackles.

In 2022, Hagerty played in 14 regular season games where he recorded seven defensive tackles, nine special teams tackles, and one forced fumble. However, he was injured near the end of the season and was on the injured list when the Argonauts won the 109th Grey Cup. Hagerty was again injured in 2023 and played in just three games where he had eight defensive tackles and one special teams tackle. In the following offseason, he was released during training camp on May 15, 2024.

=== Edmonton Elks ===
Hagerty signed with the Edmonton Elks on June 10, 2024. He played in three regular season games where he had one special teams tackle before being released on July 7, 2024. Hagerty returned to the Elks on July 23, 2024. He became a free agent upon the expiry of his contract on February 11, 2025.

=== Winnipeg Blue Bombers ===
On February 11, 2025, Hagerty signed a one-year contract with the Winnipeg Blue Bombers. He began the 2025 season on the injured list before being moved to the practice roster. He was released on July 1, 2025.

=== BC Lions ===
On July 16, 2025, Hagerty signed with the BC Lions, joining their practice roster. On August 6, 2025, Hagerty was promoted to the Lions' active roster. On December 16, Hagerty re-signed with the Lions, on a two-year contract extension. On September 17, 2026, Hagerty was suspended by the CFL for two games for punching Montreal Alouettes running back Liam Talbot twice in the groin area during the Lion's game against the Allouettes on September 12, 2026, which ties the record for the longest suspension for an on-field incident in CFL history and left Talbot with a "potentially life-altering" injury that required season-ending surgery. After an internal review conducted during his suspension, Hagerty was ultimately released by the Lions on October 6.

== Personal life ==
Hagerty's father, Jeff, also played football for the Saskatchewan Huskies and won a Vanier Cup with the team in 1990.
