= Peter Nicastro =

Canadian gridiron football player (born 1999)

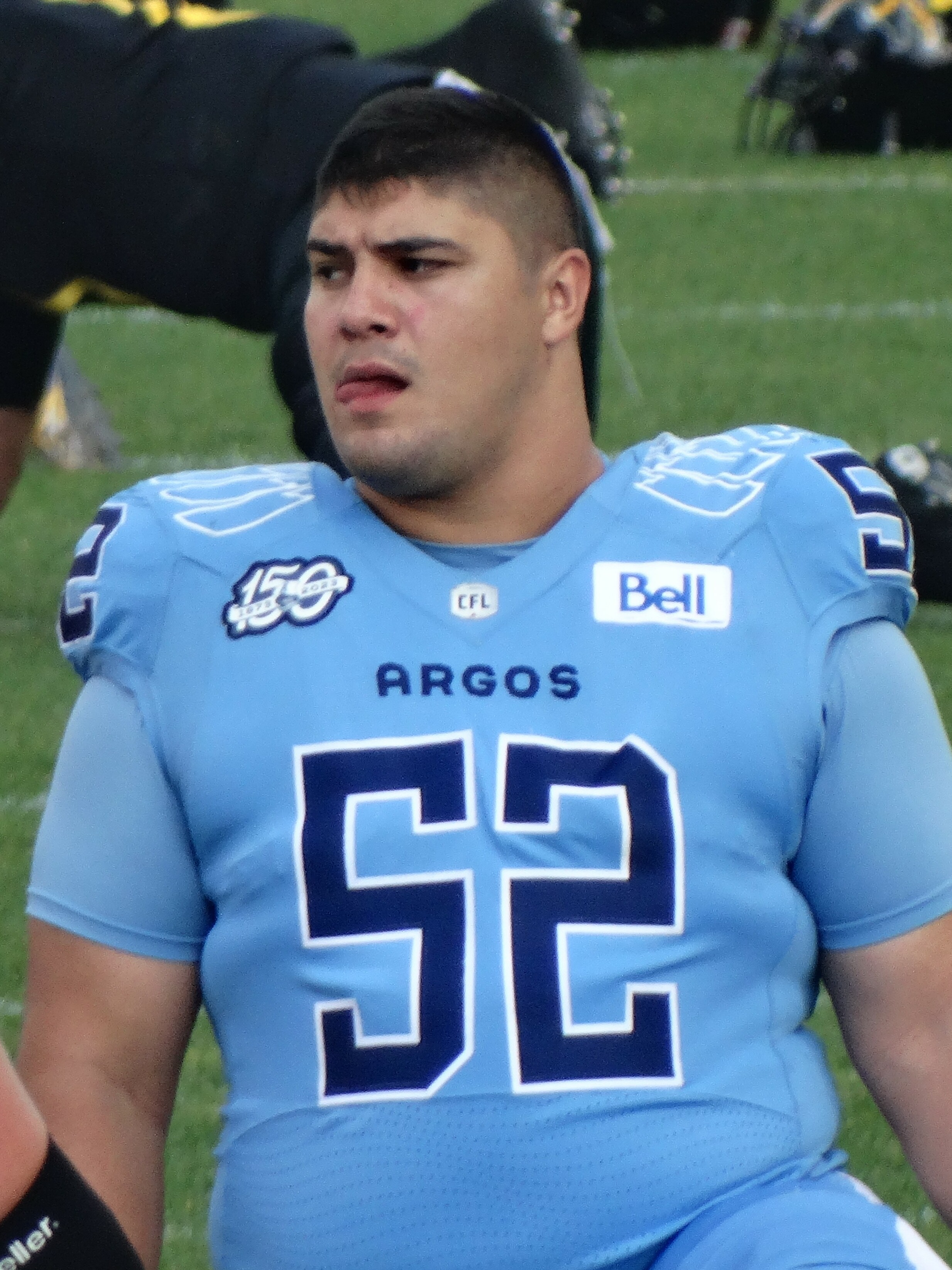
- Nicastro with the Toronto Argonauts in 2023

No. 52 – Toronto Argonauts
- Position: Offensive lineman
- Roster status: Active
- CFL status: National

Personal information
- Born: December 9, 1998 (age 27); Calgary, Alberta, Canada
- Listed height: 6 ft 2 in (1.88 m)
- Listed weight: 295 lb (134 kg)

Career information
- High school: St. Francis High
- College: Calgary Dinos
- CFL draft: 2021: 1st round, 7th overall pick

Career history
- 2021–present: Toronto Argonauts

Awards and highlights
- 2× Grey Cup champion (2022, 2024); Vanier Cup champion (2019); 2x CFL East All-Star (2021, 2026); Frank M. Gibson Trophy (2021)
- Stats at CFL.ca

Peter Nicastro (born December 9, 1998) is a Canadian professional football offensive lineman for the Toronto Argonauts of the Canadian Football League (CFL). He is a two-time Grey Cup champion after winning with the Argonauts in 2022 and 2024.

== University career ==
Nicastro played U Sports football for the Calgary Dinos football team. During his U Sports career, Nicastro started at 20 games for the Dinos from 2017 to 2019, and won the Vanier Cup in 2019.

== Professional career ==
Pre-draft measurables
Height	Weight	40-yard dash	20-yard shuttle	Three-cone drill	Broad jump	Bench press
6 ft 1 3/4 in (1.87 m)	306 lb (139 kg)	5.40 s	4.56 s	7.13 s	8 ft 4.5 in (2.55 m)	24 reps
All values from CFL Combine

The Toronto Argonauts selected Nicastro with the seventh overall pick in the 2021 CFL draft. He then signed with the team on May 18, 2021. He earned a starting position following training camp and played in his first professional game on August 7, 2021, against his hometown Calgary Stampeders at McMahon Stadium as the Argonauts' starting left guard. Nicastro played and started in 11 regular season games, but suffered a knee injury on October 30, 2021, against the BC Lions, causing him to miss the remainder of the season. He also missed the entire 2023 season due to this injury and the subsequent surgery, and was on the injured list when the Argonauts defeated the Winnipeg Blue Bombers in the 109th Grey Cup game.

After returning healthy in 2023, Nicastro played and started in 17 regular season games. He also started in the team's East Final loss to the Montreal Alouettes. In the 2024 season, played and started in all 18 regular season games. He also played and started in all three post-season games, including the 111th Grey Cup where the Argonauts defeated the Winnipeg Blue Bombers 41–24.
