= Tigie Sankoh =

Sierra Leonean gridiron football player (born 1996)

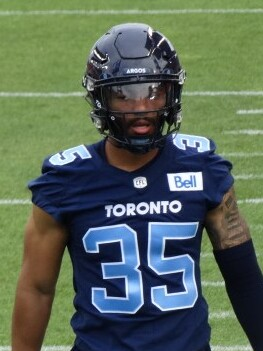
- Sankoh with the Toronto Argonauts in 2022

Profile
- Position: Defensive back

Personal information
- Born: November 4, 1996 (age 30); Sierra Leone
- Listed height: 5 ft 11 in (1.80 m)
- Listed weight: 215 lb (98 kg)

Career information
- High school: Archbishop Tenison's Church of England
- College: none
- CFL draft: 2021G: 1st round, 3rd overall pick

Career history
- Kent Exiles (2014); South London Renegades (2015–2016); London Warriors (2017); Cleveland Browns (2018–2019)*; Ingolstadt Praetorians (2021)*; Toronto Argonauts (2021–2023)
- * Offseason or practice squad member only

Awards and highlights
- Grey Cup champion (2022)

Career CFL statistics as of Week 16, 2021
- Games played: 4
- Tackles: 7
- Stats at Pro Football Reference
- Stats at CFL.ca

Tigie Sankoh (born November 4, 1996) is a Sierra Leonean professional gridiron football defensive back. He has played for the Toronto Argonauts of the Canadian Football League (CFL).

== Early life ==
Sankoh was born on November 4, 1996, in Sierra Leone. His parents moved to Maryland when he was young, and to England when he was 15. He attended high school in Kennington at Archbishop Tenison's Church of England High School.

== Football career ==
"Missing American football," Sankoh found local teams through Google, joining the Kent Exiles in 2014. He moved to the South London Renegades in 2015. Sankoh scored the game-winning touchdown in a win over the London Warriors. In 2017, he was noticed by NFLUK head of football development Aden Durde who helped him join the London Warriors in England's top football division. He later got an invitation to go to Florida and train at IMG Academy in the National Football League (NFL)'s International Player Pathway Program. He was assigned to the Cleveland Browns on May 14, 2018. Sankoh was given an international roster exemption at the start of the season, and did not see any playing time. He was given a second exemption in 2019, but was later released. In 2021, he was signed by the Ingolstadt Praetorians. He left the team a month later after being selected with the third overall pick in the 2021 CFL global draft by the Toronto Argonauts. In the 2021 CFL season, Sankoh appeared in four games, making one defensive tackle and six special teams tackles.

To start the 2022 season, Sankoh was released with the final training camp cuts on June 5, 2022. However, he was re-signed by the team three days later on June 8, 2022. He played in nine regular season games where he had two defensive tackles and six special teams tackles. He did not play in the post-season that year and was on the injured list when the Argonauts won the 109th Grey Cup.

In 2023, Sankoh played in five regular season games and had two special teams tackles. His contract expired in the following offseason on February 13, 2024.
