= Trevor Hoyte (Canadian football) =

Canadian gridiron football player (born 1998)

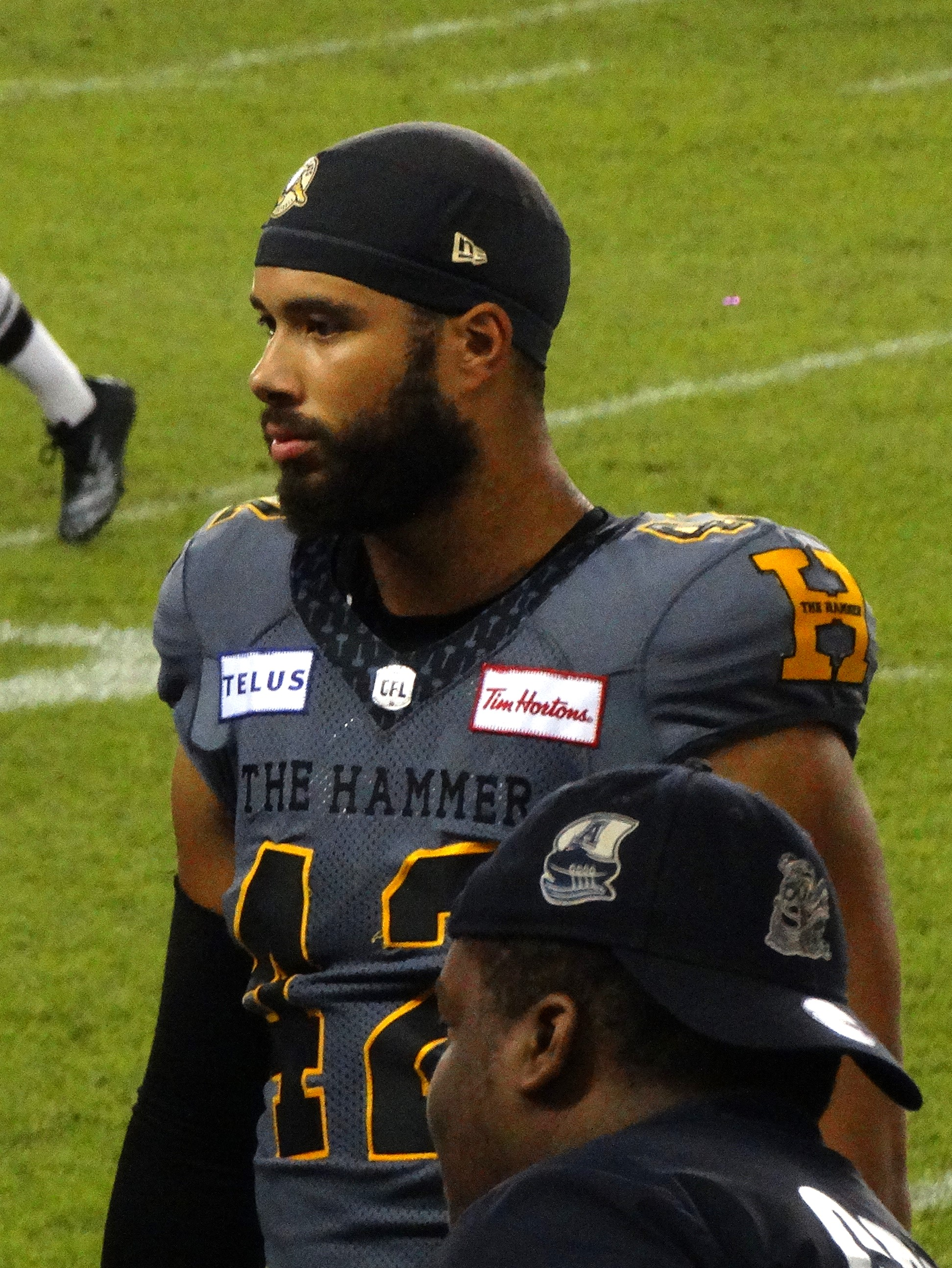
- Hoyte with the Hamilton Tiger-Cats in 2024

Profile
- Position: Linebacker

Personal information
- Born: May 30, 1998 (age 28); Gatineau, Quebec, Canada
- Listed height: 6 ft 2 in (1.88 m)
- Listed weight: 213 lb (97 kg)

Career information
- College: John Abbott
- University: Carleton
- CFL draft: 2021: 4th round, 33rd overall pick

Career history
- 2021–2023: Toronto Argonauts
- 2024–2025: Hamilton Tiger-Cats

Awards and highlights
- Grey Cup champion (2022)

Career CFL statistics as of 2025
- Total tackles: 101
- Fumble recoveries: 1
- Pass knockdowns: 2
- Stats at CFL.ca

Trevor Hoyte (born May 30, 1998) is a Canadian professional football linebacker. He most recently played for the Hamilton Tiger-Cats of the Canadian Football League (CFL).

== University career ==
Following his college career with the John Abbott College Islanders, Hoyte played U Sports football for the Carleton Ravens from 2017 to 2019. He played in 22 regular season games where he had 75 tackles, six tackles for a loss, 4.5 sacks, four forced fumbles, and two interceptions. In the 2019 season, he was named first team OUA All-star at SAM linebacker. He did not play in 2020 due to the cancellation of the 2020 U Sports football season and remained draft-eligible for the Canadian Football League in 2021.

== Professional career ==
Pre-draft measurables
Height	Weight	40-yard dash	20-yard shuttle	Three-cone drill	Broad jump	Bench press
6 ft 2 1/8 in (1.88 m)	218.8 lb (99 kg)	4.83 s	4.33 s	7.10 s	10 ft 0 1/2 in (3.06 m)	15 reps
All values from CFL Combine

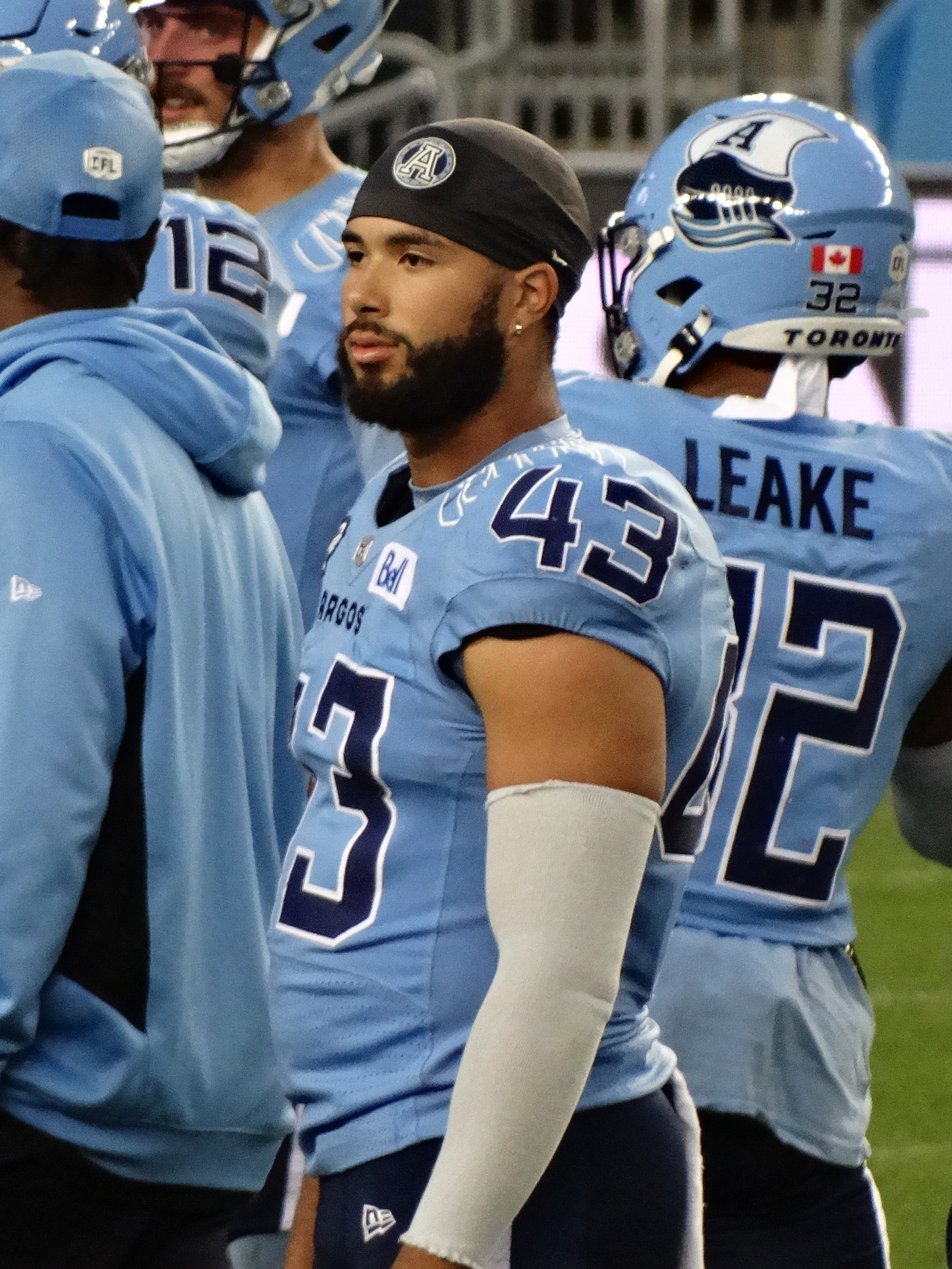
Hoyte with the Toronto Argonauts in 2023

=== Toronto Argonauts ===
Hoyte was drafted in the fourth round, 33rd overall, in the 2021 CFL draft by the Toronto Argonauts and signed with the team on May 13, 2021. He made the team following training camp and played in his first career professional game on August 7, 2021, against the Calgary Stampeders. He was featured heavily on defence on September 17, 2021, due to an injury to Cameron Judge, where he made his first six career defensive tackles in a game against the Saskatchewan Roughriders. Following a number of injuries to other players, Hoyte made his first career start, at middle linebacker, on October 11, 2021, against the Hamilton Tiger-Cats, where he had five defensive tackles. He played in all 14 regular season games in 2021 where he had 20 defensive tackles and six special teams tackles.

In 2022, Hoyte played in 17 regular season games where he had 14 defensive tackles, eight special teams tackles, one pass knockdown, and one blocked kick. He played in both post-season games and made his Grey Cup debut in the 109th Grey Cup game. In the championship game, Hoyte had one special teams tackle as the Argonauts defeated the Winnipeg Blue Bombers. In 2023, he played in all 18 regular season games where he had one defensive tackle and 17 special teams tackles. He became a free agent upon the expiry of his contract on February 13, 2024.

=== Hamilton Tiger-Cats ===
On May 17, 2024, it was announced that Hoyte had signed with the Hamilton Tiger-Cats. He played for two seasons with the Tiger-Cats and became a free agent upon the expiry of his contract on February 10, 2026.

== Personal life ==
Hoyte's father, Ian Hoyte, played football for the Wilfrid Laurier Golden Hawks and Hoyte's sister, Lia Hoyte, was a U Sports All-Canadian in Rugby for the Concordia Stingers. Hoyte majored in astrophysics while attending Carleton University and worked on the DEAP-3600 dark matter direct detection experiment where he was a member of the neutrino working group.
