= Cody Speller =

Canadian football player (born 1994)

No. 63
- Position: Offensive lineman

Personal information
- Born: May 10, 1994 (age 32); Caistor Centre, Ontario, Canada
- Listed height: 6 ft 4 in (1.93 m)
- Listed weight: 298 lb (135 kg)

Career information
- University: McMaster
- CFL draft: 2017: undrafted

Career history
- 2017: Winnipeg Blue Bombers*
- 2018–2020: Winnipeg Blue Bombers
- 2021: Toronto Argonauts*
- * Offseason or practice squad member only

Awards and highlights
- Grey Cup champion (2019)
- Stats at CFL.ca

Cody Speller (born May 10, 1994) is a Canadian former professional football offensive lineman who played in the Canadian Football League (CFL). He played CIS football for the McMaster Marauders from 2012 to 2017.

== Professional career ==
=== Winnipeg Blue Bombers ===
Speller signed as an undrafted free agent with the Winnipeg Blue Bombers on May 19, 2017. He spent training camp with the team and was part of the final cuts when the team released him on June 16, 2017. He returned to McMaster for his final year of playing eligibility and was re-signed by the Blue Bombers during the following off-season on December 12, 2017.

Following training camp in 2018, Speller began the season on the practice roster. He then dressed in his first professional football game in the Banjo Bowl on September 8, 2018 against the Saskatchewan Roughriders. In total, he dressed in two games in 2018 while also playing in that year's regular season finale.

Speller competed for a starting position in the interior line as a guard during the 2019 season. He played in 13 regular season games and started eight games at guard. He then started in the three post-season games that year at centre, including in the 107th Grey Cup, where he won his first Grey Cup championship in the Blue Bombers' win over the Hamilton Tiger-Cats.

=== Toronto Argonauts ===
As a pending free agent in 2021, Speller's playing rights were traded to the Toronto Argonauts on January 27, 2021. Shortly afterward, he re-signed with the Argonauts on January 31, 2021. He was placed on the suspended list on July 16, 2021.
