= Benoit Marion =

Canadian gridiron football player (born 1995)

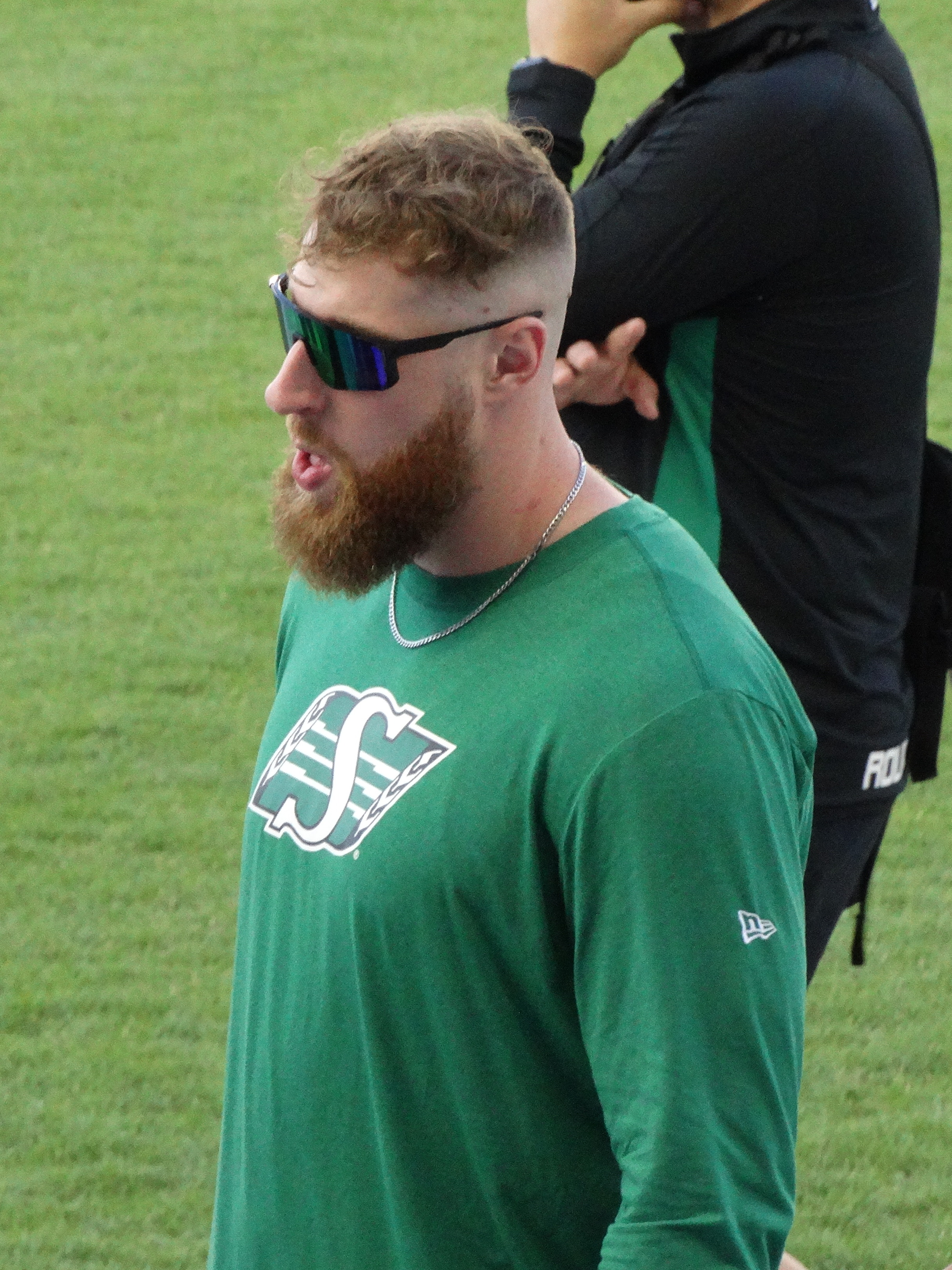
- Marion with the Saskatchewan Roughriders in 2025

No. 93 – Saskatchewan Roughriders
- Position: Defensive lineman
- Roster status: 6-game injured list
- CFL status: National

Personal information
- Born: December 11, 1995 (age 30); Montreal, Quebec, Canada
- Listed height: 6 ft 4 in (1.93 m)
- Listed weight: 260 lb (118 kg)

Career information
- High school: Collège Notre-Dame (Quebec)
- CEGEP: André Grasset
- University: Montreal
- CFL draft: 2020: 3rd round, 25th overall pick

Career history
- 2020–2021: Montreal Alouettes*
- 2021–2024: Toronto Argonauts
- 2024: Hamilton Tiger-Cats
- 2024–present: Saskatchewan Roughriders
- * Offseason or practice squad member only

Awards and highlights
- 2× Grey Cup champion (2022, 2025)

Career CFL statistics as of 2025
- Games played: 48
- Defensive tackles: 13
- Sacks: 2
- Spec. Teams tackles: 30
- Stats at CFL.ca

Benoit Marion (born December 11, 1995) is a Canadian professional football defensive lineman for the Saskatchewan Roughriders of the Canadian Football League (CFL).

== Early life ==
Marion was born on December 11, 1995, in Montreal, Quebec. He attended Collège Notre-Dame du Sacré-Cœur for high school, and Collège André-Grasset for his CEGEP years. Marion played U Sports football at Montreal from 2016 to 2019, appearing in 25 total games. In his college career he recorded 66.5 tackles, 19.5 tackles for loss, and 11 sacks, six of which came in his senior season. He also played junior ice hockey for the Quebec Remparts.

== Professional career ==
=== Montreal Alouettes ===
Marion was selected in the 3rd round (25th overall) of the 2020 CFL draft by the Montreal Alouettes. The 2020 CFL season was canceled and he was released before the 2021 began on July 26, 2021.

=== Toronto Argonauts ===
Marion was signed by the Toronto Argonauts on October 25, 2021. He appeared in two games with the Argonauts that season, making one tackle and one pass deflection. In 2022, Marion played in 12 regular season games where he had five defensive tackles and three special teams tackles. He also scored his first career touchdown when he recovered a block kick and returned it 24 yards for a score against the Hamilton Tiger-Cats on August 6, 2022. Marion also played in the 109th Grey Cup victory over the Winnipeg Blue Bombers, which secured his first Grey Cup championship.

In the 2023 season, Marion played in 16 regular season games where he recorded one defensive tackle, eight special teams tackles, one sack, and two forced fumbles. He played in the first game of the 2024 season, where he had one special teams tackle, but was released shortly after the game on June 11, 2024.

=== Hamilton Tiger-Cats ===
On June 12, 2024, it was announced that Marion had signed with the Hamilton Tiger-Cats. He played in nine regular season games before being released on September 11, 2024. Marion was re-signed by the Tiger-Cats on October 2, 2024, only to be released again the next day on October 3, 2024.

=== Saskatchewan Roughriders ===
On October 4, 2024, it was announced that Marion had signed with the Saskatchewan Roughriders.
