= Maxime Latour =

Canadian gridiron football player (born 1993)

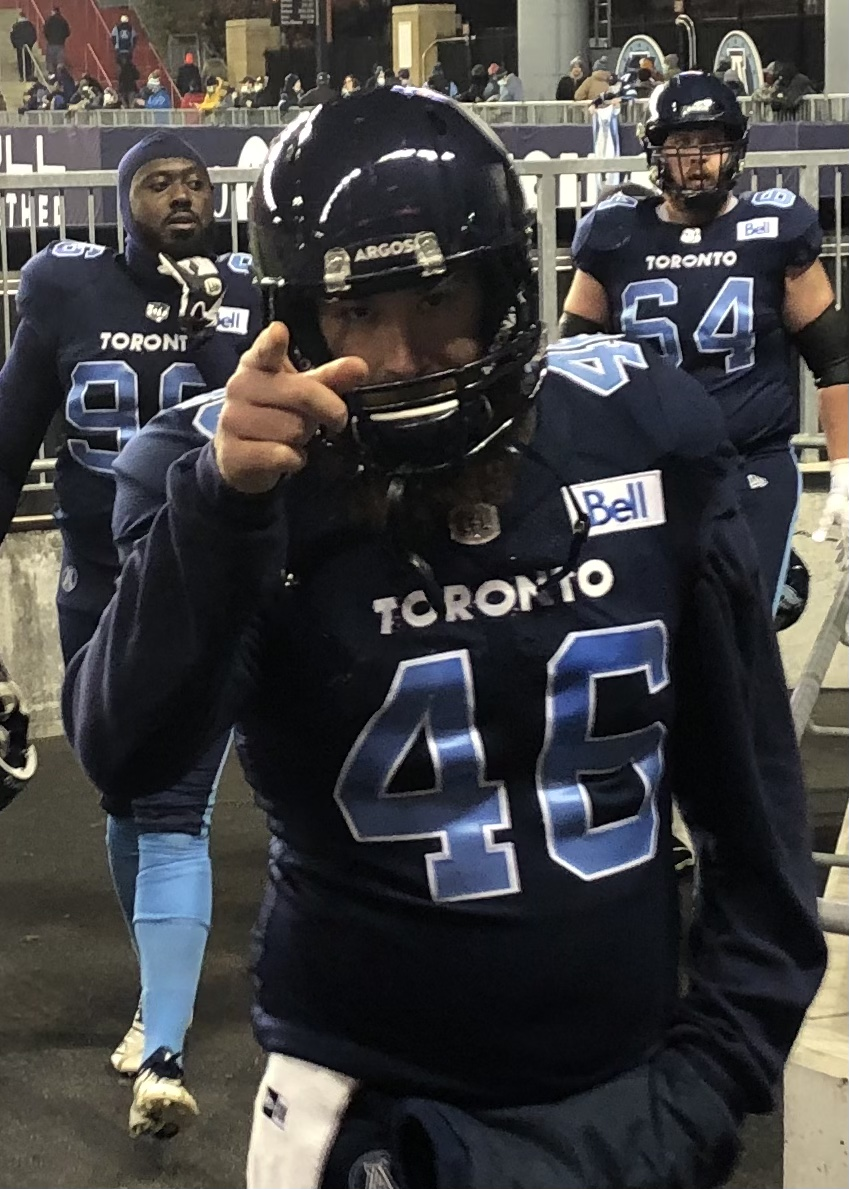
- Latour with the Toronto Argonauts in 2021

No. 58, 46, 53
- Position: Long snapper

Personal information
- Born: April 12, 1993 (age 33); Valleyfield, Quebec, Canada
- Listed height: 6 ft 4 in (1.93 m)
- Listed weight: 250 lb (113 kg)

Career information
- High school: Baie-Saint-François High
- University: Sherbrooke
- CFL draft: 2018: undrafted

Career history
- 2018–2019: Montreal Alouettes*
- 2019–2020: Winnipeg Blue Bombers
- 2021: Ottawa Redblacks*
- 2021: Toronto Argonauts
- 2021: Ottawa Redblacks*
- 2022: Toronto Argonauts
- 2023: Calgary Stampeders
- * Offseason or practice squad member only

Awards and highlights
- 2× Grey Cup champion (2019, 2022)
- Stats at CFL.ca

Maxime Latour (born April 12, 1993) is a Canadian former professional football long snapper who played in the Canadian Football League (CFL). He played U Sports football for the Sherbrooke Vert et Or.

== University career ==
Latour played U Sports football for the Sherbrooke Vert et Or from 2014 to 2017. He played in 28 regular season games in four seasons for the Vert et Or as the team's long snapper.

== Professional career ==
=== Montreal Alouettes ===
Latour was eligible for the 2018 CFL draft, but was not selected in the draft. He was then signed on September 26, 2018, by the Montreal Alouettes as an undrafted free agent to the team's practice roster. He was released on October 31, 2018, just prior to the last game of the regular season, but was re-signed by the Alouettes to a one-year contract on December 12, 2018. Latour spent training camp with the Alouettes in 2019, but was released with the final cuts on June 9, 2019.

=== Winnipeg Blue Bombers ===
On September 4, 2019, Latour was signed by the Winnipeg Blue Bombers to a practice roster agreement following an injury to the team's incumbent long snapper, Chad Rempel. Soon after, he made his professional debut on September 7, 2019, in the Banjo Bowl against the Saskatchewan Roughriders. Rempel returned for the next game and Latour was added back to the practice roster. With Rempel injured toward the end of the regular season, Latour was again pressed into action and played in the last two games of the regular season. He then made his post-season debut on November 10, 2021, against the Calgary Stampeders, but suffered a back injury in the game. This coincided with Rempel's return from the injured reserve, so Latour switched places and went to the injured list himself. Two weeks later, the Blue Bombers won the 107th Grey Cup over the Hamilton Tiger-Cats and Latour won the first Grey Cup championship of his career.

Due to the cancellation of the 2020 CFL season, Latour did not play in 2020. His contract expired on February 9, 2021, and he became a free agent.

=== Ottawa Redblacks (first stint) ===
On September 13, 2021, it was announced that Latour had signed with the Ottawa Redblacks. He was then transferred to the team's practice roster and did not play in a game for the team.

=== Toronto Argonauts (first stint) ===
After the Toronto Argonauts' long snapper, Jake Reinhart, suffered a severe injury, Latour was claimed by the team from the Redblacks' practice roster on October 7, 2021. He played in the six remaining regular season games for the team and the East Final.

=== Ottawa Redblacks (second stint) ===
After the Argonauts' season ended with an East Final loss, Latour's playing rights reverted to the Redblacks on December 6, 2021. He became a free agent upon the expiry of his contract on February 8, 2022.

=== Toronto Argonauts (second stint) ===
On August 9, 2022, Latour re-signed with the Argonauts. On May 17, 2023, Latour was released by the Argonauts.

=== Calgary Stampeders ===
On August 2, 2023, it was announced that Latour had signed a practice roster agreement with the Calgary Stampeders. He was promoted to the active roster the next day. He was released on August 16, 2023.

== Personal life ==
During the COVID-19 pandemic in 2020, Latour started a farming business in Orford, Quebec, with his friend, Nicolas Boulay.
