= Dewayne Hendrix =

American gridiron football player (born 1995)

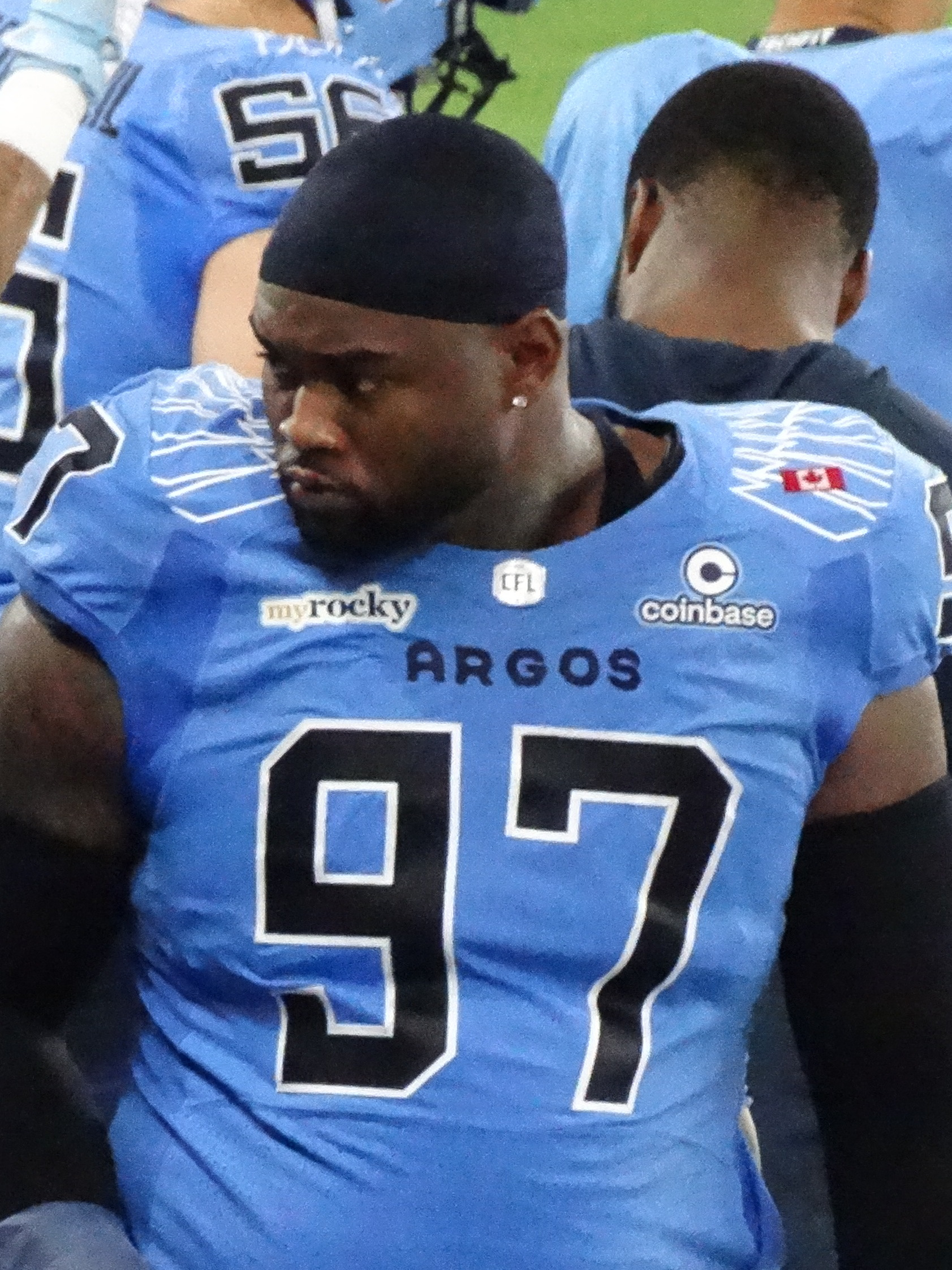
- Hendrix with the Toronto Argonauts in 2026

No. 97 – Toronto Argonauts
- Position: Defensive tackle
- Roster status: Reserve
- CFL status: American

Personal information
- Born: June 13, 1996 (age 30); St. Louis, Missouri, U.S.
- Listed height: 6 ft 4 in (1.93 m)
- Listed weight: 275 lb (125 kg)

Career information
- High school: O'Fallon (O'Fallon, Illinois)
- College: Pittsburgh
- NFL draft: 2019: undrafted

Career history
- Miami Dolphins (2019)*; Chicago Bears (2019)*; Jacksonville Jaguars (2019)*; St. Louis BattleHawks (2020); Pittsburgh Steelers (2020)*; Toronto Argonauts (2021–2023); Hamilton Tiger-Cats (2024); BC Lions (2025); Toronto Argonauts (2026–present)
- * Offseason or practice squad member only

Awards and highlights
- Grey Cup champion (2022)
- Stats at Pro Football Reference
- Stats at CFL.ca

Dewayne Hendrix (born June 13, 1996) is an American professional football defensive tackle for the Toronto Argonauts of the Canadian Football League (CFL). He played college football for the Pittsburgh Panthers.

== Early life ==
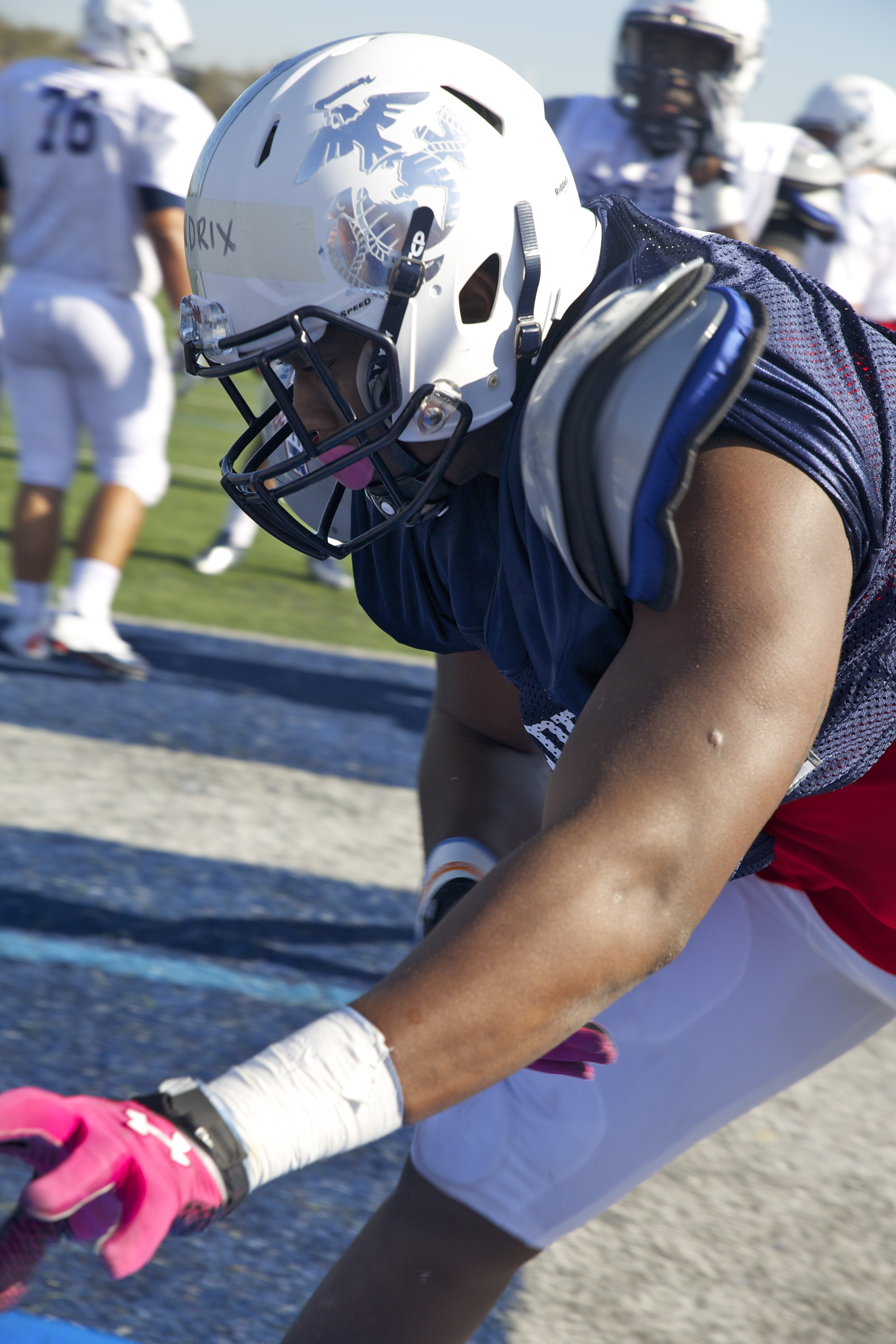
Hendrix at the 2014 Semper Fidelis All-American Bowl

Hendrix attended O'Fallon Township High School. In his senior season, he had 60 tackles and was named a Semper Fidelis All-American. A four-star recruit, Hendrix was rated as the No. 5 strongside defensive end, the No. 3 player in Illinois, and the No. 78 overall recruit by Rivals.com. He received 22 scholarship offers, including Michigan State, Illinois and seven other Big Ten schools but committed to Tennessee.

== College career ==
Hendrix played seven games as a true freshman at Tennessee and had two tackles. In December, he announced he was transferring from the program in search of a "better opportunity." He decided to transfer to Pittsburgh on April 27, 2015, turning down offers from Illinois, Iowa State and Northern Illinois.

He lost his sophomore season to injury after hurting his foot in the Week 1 game against Villanova. In 2017, Hendrix played in 11 games and had 21 tackles including five for a loss. As a senior in 2018, he recorded 29 tackles including five for a loss and had 4.5 sacks. In his career at Pittsburgh, Hendrix played in 25 games and made 50 tackles, including 10 for a loss, 7.5 sacks and two fumble recoveries.

== Professional career ==
Pre-draft measurables
Height	Weight	Arm length	Hand span	Wingspan	40-yard dash	10-yard split	20-yard split	20-yard shuttle	Three-cone drill	Vertical jump	Broad jump	Bench press
6 ft 3 1/2 in (1.92 m)	275 lb (125 kg)	32 1/2 in (0.83 m)	9 7/8 in (0.25 m)	6 ft 4 3/4 in (1.95 m)	4.80 s	1.67 s	2.73 s	4.63 s	7.40 s	28.5 in (0.72 m)	9 ft 7 in (2.92 m)	23 reps
All values from Pro Day

=== Miami Dolphins ===
After going undrafted in the 2019 NFL draft, Hendrix was signed by the Miami Dolphins on April 29. He participated in the preseason, and had two sacks against the Atlanta Falcons and one sack versus the New Orleans Saints. He was waived on August 31. Hendrix was subsequently signed to the Dolphins' practice squad, but was waived on October 7.

=== Chicago Bears ===
On November 19, the Chicago Bears signed Hendrix to their practice squad. He was waived by the Bears on December 9.

=== Jacksonville Jaguars ===
On December 18, Hendrix was signed by the Jacksonville Jaguars to their practice squad.

=== St. Louis BattleHawks ===
Hendrix joined the St. Louis BattleHawks of the XFL. In five games with the BattleHawks, Hendrix had four tackles, one sack and a quarterback hurry. He had his contract terminated when the league suspended operations on April 10, 2020.

=== Pittsburgh Steelers ===
On March 30, 2020, Hendrix signed with the Pittsburgh Steelers. He was waived on August 2, 2020.

=== The Spring League ===
Hendrix had a tryout with the Cleveland Browns on August 19, 2020. He signed with the Alphas of The Spring League for the 2020 Fall season.

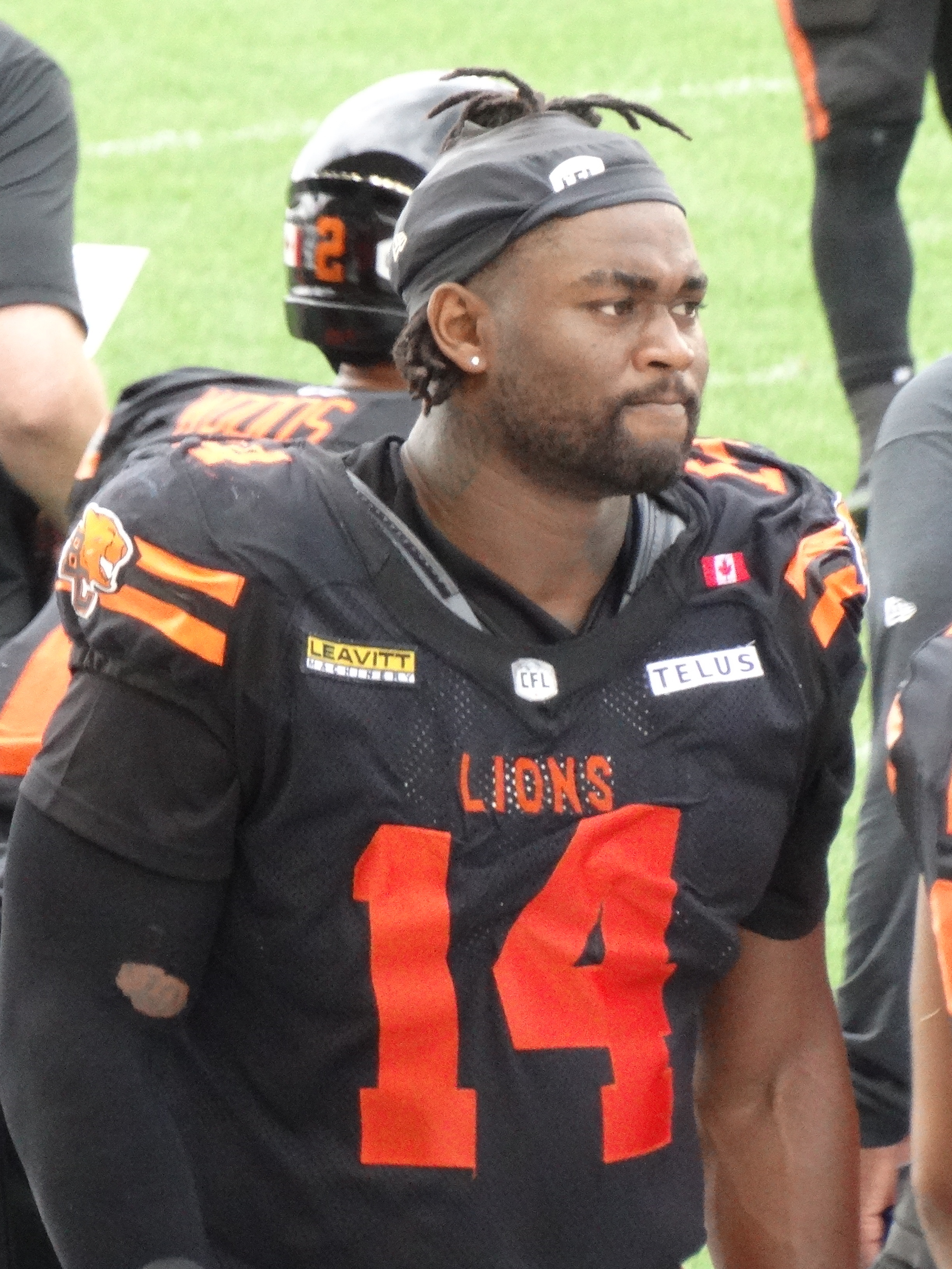
Hendrix with the BC Lions in 2025

=== Toronto Argonauts (first stint) ===
On February 12, 2021, Hendrix signed with the Toronto Argonauts of the Canadian Football League. In his first year with the Argonauts, he played in six regular season games, starting in five, where he recorded nine defensive tackles and one sack.

In 2022, Hendrix became a full time starter as he played and started in 17 regular season games where he had 33 defensive tackles, including five tackles for a loss, two pass knockdowns, and one sack. He made his post-season debut in the East Final against the Montreal Alouettes where he had six defensive tackles and one sack. He then played in his first Grey Cup game where he had one defensive tackle, one sack, and one forced fumble as the Argonauts defeated the Winnipeg Blue Bombers in the 109th Grey Cup championship. Hendrix became a free agent upon the expiry of his contract on February 13, 2024.

=== Hamilton Tiger-Cats ===
On February 14, 2024, it was announced that Hendrix had signed with the Hamilton Tiger-Cats. He played in 16 regular season games where he recorded 17 defensive tackles, four sacks, and one forced fumble. He was later released on January 30, 2025.

=== BC Lions ===
On February 2, 2025, Hendrix signed a two-year contract with the BC Lions. On September 4, 2025, Hendrix was placed on the Lions' 1-game injured list. He rejoined the active roster on September 11, 2025. On September 25, 2025, Hendrix was again placed on the Lions' 1-game injured list. He rejoined the active roster on October 3, 2025. He played in 13 regular season games where he had 21 defensive tackles and fours sacks. He was released on January 15, 2026.

=== Toronto Argonauts (second stint) ===
On January 19, 2026, it was announced that Hendrix had signed with the Toronto Argonauts. He was released on July 14, 2026, but signed again one week later on July 21, 2026.
