= 2010 CIS football season =

- Duration: August 31, 2010 – October 30, 2010
- Hardy Cup champions: Calgary Dinos
- Yates Cup champions: Western Ontario Mustangs
- Dunsmore Cup champions: Laval Rouge et Or
- Loney Bowl champions: Saint Mary's Huskies
- Mitchell Bowl champions: Calgary Dinos
- Uteck Bowl champions: Laval Rouge et Or

Vanier Cup
- Date: November 27, 2010
- Venue: PEPS, Quebec City, Quebec
- Champions: Laval Rouge et Or

CIS football seasons seasons
- 2009 2011

The 2010 CIS football season began on August 31, 2010, with the Windsor Lancers hosting the Ottawa Gee-Gees and the defending Vanier Cup champion Queen's Golden Gaels visiting the McMaster Marauders. The season concluded on November 27 at the PEPS stadium in Quebec City, Quebec with the Laval Rouge et Or winning the 46th Vanier Cup, a record tying sixth championship for the school. In this year, 25 university teams in Canada played CIS football, the highest level of amateur Canadian football.

== Notable events ==
After their successful application into the NCAA Division II, the Simon Fraser Clan left the Canada West Universities Athletic Association to join the Great Northwest Athletic Conference, leaving Canada West with six teams. The Clan, whose athletic programs were moved from the NAIA to CIS as a temporary refuge (up to that point, the Clan was to compete only against American universities), will continue to play football under Canadian (and CIS) rules when they play the UBC Thunderbirds in their annual cross-town rivalry matchup in October, but will otherwise play American football under the NCAA's rules.

The Waterloo Warriors have suspended its football operations this season, following a steroid investigation the previous season that had led to all 65 members of its team tested for steroids in March, with 3 positive results. Charges against the three Warriors players testing positive for drug trafficking by the RCMP are still pending. A further round of testing also saw players from the Windsor Lancers and the Acadia Axemen suspended for doping violations, though both universities will still field teams for the season.

== Schedule ==
31 August 2010
Ottawa Gee-Gees	23-14	Windsor Lancers	Alumni Field
Queen's Golden Gaels	18–23	McMaster Marauders	Ron Joyce Stadium
1 September 2010
Toronto Varsity Blues	13–15	Guelph Gryphons	Alumni Stadium
Laurier Golden Hawks	1–46	Western Mustangs	TD Waterhouse Stadium
2 September 2010
Sherbrooke Vert et Or	29–33	Montréal Carabins	CEPSUM Stadium
3 September 2010
Manitoba Bisons	11–45	Regina Rams	Mosaic Stadium at Taylor Field
4 September 2010
Alberta Golden Bears	36–28	UBC Thunderbirds	Thunderbird Stadium
Saskatchewan Huskies	34–13	Calgary Dinos	McMahon Stadium
Concordia Stingers	17–14	Bishop's Gaiters	Coulter Field
5 September 2010
McGill Redmen	9–50	Laval Rouge et Or	PEPS Stadium
6 September 2010
Guelph Gryphons	26–2	York Lions	York Stadium
Western Ontario Mustangs	19–20	Ottawa Gee-Gees	Frank Clair Stadium
Wilfrid Laurier Golden Hawks	24–26	McMaster Marauders	Ron Joyce Stadium
Windsor Lancers	26–17	Toronto Varsity Blues	Varsity Stadium
10 September 2010
UBC Thunderbirds	31–12	Saskatchewan Huskies	Griffiths Stadium
Regina Rams	21–24	Calgary Dinos	McMahon Stadium
11 September 2010
Saint Mary's Huskies	7–17	Acadia Axemen	Raymond Field
Bishop's Gaiters	26–19 (2OT)	McGill Redmen	Molson Stadium
McMaster Marauders	19–50	Western Mustangs	TD Waterhouse Stadium
Montréal Carabins	29–8	Concordia Stingers	Concordia Stadium
Ottawa Gee-Gees	45–3	York Lions	York Stadium
St. Francis Xavier X-Men	6–19	Mount Allison Mounties	McAulay Field
Alberta Golden Bears	31–6	Manitoba Bisons	University Stadium (Winnipeg)
Laval Rouge et Or	36–6	Sherbrooke Vert et Or	Stade de l'Université de Sherbrooke
Toronto Varsity Blues	1–0*	Laurier Golden Hawks	Knight-Newbrough Field
12 September 2010
Windsor Lancers	7–40	Queen's Golden Gaels	Richardson Memorial Stadium
17 September 2010
Concordia Stingers	34–29	McGill Redmen	Molson Stadium
Mount Allison Mounties	10–44	Sherbrooke Vert et Or	Stade de l'Université de Sherbrooke
18 September 2010
Montréal Carabins	27–10	St. Francis Xavier X-Men	Oland Stadium
McMaster Marauders	35–43	Ottawa Gee-Gees	Frank Clair Stadium
Laval Rouge et Or	45–7	Saint Mary's Huskies	Huskies Stadium
Acadia Axemen	16–31	Bishop's Gaiters	Coulter Field
York Lions	19–24	Toronto Varsity Blues	Varsity Stadium
Queen's Golden Gaels	15–21	Guelph Gryphons	Alumni Stadium
Calgary Dinos	23–14	Alberta Golden Bears	Foote Field
Manitoba Bisons	40–17	UBC Thunderbirds	Thunderbird Stadium
Western Mustangs	30–15	Windsor Lancers	University of Windsor Stadium
Saskatchewan Huskies	26–37	Regina Rams	Mosaic Stadium at Taylor Field
24 September 2010
McGill Redmen	11–24	Montréal Carabins	CEPSUM Stadium
Saskatchewan Huskies	33–9	Alberta Golden Bears	Foote Field
Regina Rams	41–6	UBC Thunderbirds	Thunderbird Stadium
25 September 2010
Saint Mary's Huskies	21–23	Mount Allison Mounties	Rockystone Field
York Lions	14–68	Laurier Golden Hawks	Knight-Newbrough Field
Bishop's Gaiters	18–17	Concordia Stingers	Concordia Stadium
Windsor Lancers	3–39	McMaster Marauders	Ron Joyce Stadium
Ottawa Gee-Gees	27–25	Queen's Golden Gaels	Richardson Memorial Stadium
Western Mustangs	15–8	Guelph Gryphons	Alumni Stadium
Calgary Dinos	26–25	Manitoba Bisons	University Stadium (Winnipeg)
St. Francis Xavier X-Men	11–24	Acadia Axemen	Raymond Field
26 September 2010
Sherbrooke Vert et Or	7–23	Laval Rouge et Or	PEPS Stadium
1 October 2010
Acadia Axemen	10–45	Saint Mary's Huskies	Huskies Stadium
Manitoba Bisons	3–64	Saskatchewan Huskies	Griffiths Stadium
2 October 2010
Mount Allison Mounties	26–37	St. Francis Xavier X-Men	Oland Stadium
Queen's Golden Gaels	10–46	Western Mustangs	TD Waterhouse Stadium
Guelph Gryphons	2–36	Laurier Golden Hawks	Knight-Newbrough Field
McMaster Marauders	64–6	York Lions	York Stadium
Sherbrooke Vert et Or	34–8	McGill Redmen	Molson Stadium
Ottawa Gee-Gees	35–40	Toronto Varsity Blues	Varsity Stadium
Montreal Carabins	POSTPONED	Bishop's Gaiters	Coulter Field
UBC Thunderbirds	16–33	Calgary Dinos	McMahon Stadium
Alberta Golden Bears	8–40	Regina Rams	Mosaic Stadium at Taylor Field
3 October 2010
Concordia Stingers	10–46	Laval Rouge et Or	PEPS Stadium
Montreal Carabins	21–39	Bishop's Gaiters	Coulter Field
7 October 2010
Guelph Gryphons	18–23	McMaster Marauders	Ron Joyce Stadium
8 October 2010
Saint Mary's Huskies	43–16	St. Francis Xavier X-Men	Oland Stadium
Bishop's Gaiters	40–10	Sherbrooke Vert et Or	Stade de l'Université de Sherbrooke
9 October 2010
Acadia Axemen	26–19	Mount Allison Mounties	Rockystone Field
York Lions	15–61	Windsor Lancers	University of Windsor Stadium
Laurier Golden Hawks	21–44	Ottawa Gee-Gees	Frank Clair Stadium
Toronto Varsity Blues	1–66	Queen's Golden Gaels	Richardson Memorial Stadium
McGill Redmen	11–21	Concordia Stingers	Concordia Stadium
Laval Rouge et Or	19–12	Montreal Carabins	CEPSUM Stadium
15 October 2010
St. Francis Xavier X-Men	6–41	Saint Mary's Huskies	Huskies Stadium
Calgary Dinos	17–36	Saskatchewan Huskies	Griffiths Stadium
16 October 2010
Mount Allison Mounties	20–7	Acadia Axemen	Raymond Field
McMaster Marauders	40–21	Toronto Varsity Blues	Varsity Stadium
Windsor Lancers	14–41	Guelph Gryphons	Alumni Stadium
Concordia Stingers	36–39	Sherbrooke Vert et Or	Stade de l'Université de Sherbrooke
Montreal Carabins	30–7	McGill Redmen	Molson Stadium
Western Mustangs	76–0	York Lions	York Stadium
Queen's Golden Gaels	23–44	Laurier Golden Hawks	Knight-Newbrough Field
Regina Rams	41–19	Manitoba Bisons	University Stadium (Winnipeg)
UBC Thunderbirds	32–28	Alberta Golden Bears	Foote Field
17 October 2010
Bishop's Gaiters	0–62	Laval Rouge et Or	PEPS Stadium
22 October 2010
Concordia Stingers	21–14	Montreal Carabins	CEPSUM Stadium
Calgary Dinos	35–27	Regina Rams	Mosaic Stadium at Taylor Field
Saskatchewan Huskies	14–41	UBC Thunderbirds	Thunderbird Stadium
23 October 2010
Mount Allison Mounties	7–43	Saint Mary's Huskies	Huskies Stadium
Acadia Axemen	34–0	St. Francis Xavier X-Men	Oland Stadium
Toronto Varsity Blues	23–35	Western Mustangs	TD Waterhouse Stadium
Guelph Gryphons	11–54	Ottawa Gee-Gees	Frank Clair Stadium
Sherbrooke Vert et Or	49–11	Bishop's Gaiters	Coulter Field
Laval Rouge et Or	68–0	McGill Redmen	Molson Stadium
York Lions	14–52	Queen's Golden Gaels	Richardson Memorial Stadium
Laurier Golden Hawks	56–16	Windsor Lancers	University of Windsor Stadium
Manitoba Bisons	21–46	Alberta Golden Bears	Foote Field

Montreal vs. Bishop's game on 2 October 2010 was postponed to the following day due to severe rain and flooding in the Lennoxville region.

- Laurier forfeits win due to ineligible player.

== Standings ==
2010 Canada West standings
Team (Rank)	W		L	PTS	Playoff Spot
#3 Saskatchewan	6	-	2	12	†
#5 Calgary	6	-	2	10	X
#8 Regina	5	-	3	10	X
Alberta	3	-	5	6	X
Manitoba	2	-	6	4	
UBC	2	-	6	4	
† – Conference Champion; Rankings: CIS Top 10 (Nov 2)

2010 QUFL standings
Team (Rank)	W		L	PTS	Playoff Spot
#1 Laval	9	-	0	18	†
#7 Montreal	6	-	3	12	X
#10 Sherbrooke	5	-	4	10	X
Bishop's	5	-	4	10	X
Concordia	4	-	5	8	
McGill	0	-	9	0	
† – Conference Champion; Rankings: CIS Top 10 (Nov 2)

2010 OUA standings
Team (Rank)	W		L	PTS	Playoff spot
#4 Ottawa	7	-	1	14	†
#2 Western	7	-	1	14	X
#6 McMaster	6	-	2	12	X
Laurier	4	-	4	8	X
Guelph	4	-	4	8	X
Queen's	3	-	5	6	X
Toronto	3	-	5	6	
Windsor	2	-	6	4	
York	0	-	8	0	
† – Conference Champion; Rankings: CIS Top 10 (Nov 2)

2010 AUS standings
Team (Rank)	W		L	PTS	Playoff Spot
#9 Saint Mary's	5	-	3	10	†
Mount Allison	4	-	4	8	X
Acadia	4	-	4	8	X
St. FX	1	-	7	2	
† – Conference Champion; Rankings: CIS Top 10 (Nov 2)

=== Championships ===
The Vanier Cup is played between the champions of the Mitchell Bowl and the Uteck Bowl, the national semi-final games. In 2010, according to the rotating schedule, the Dunsmore Cup Quebec championship team will meet the Ontario conference's Yates Cup champion for the Uteck Bowl. The winners of the Canada West conference Hardy Trophy will host the Atlantic conference Loney Bowl champions for the Mitchell Bowl.

==== Playoff bracket ====
Conference Quarter-finals
Queen's Golden Gaels	19
McMaster Marauders	40
Guelph Gryphons	10
Wilfrid Laurier Golden Hawks	42

Conference Semi-finals
Acadia Axemen	22
Mount Allison Mounties	14
Alberta Golden Bears	31
Saskatchewan Huskies	30
Regina Rams	33
Calgary Dinos	40
McMaster Marauders	28
Western Ontario Mustangs	34
Wilfrid Laurier Golden Hawks	31
Ottawa Gee-Gees	32
Sherbrooke Vert et Or	33
Montreal Carabins	26
Bishop's Gaiters	1
Laval Rouge et Or	56

Conference Championships
Acadia Axemen	8
Saint Mary's Huskies	37
Alberta Golden Bears	3
Calgary Dinos	56
Western Ontario Mustangs	26
Ottawa Gee-Gees	25
Sherbrooke Vert et Or	17
Laval Rouge et Or	22

National Semi-finals
Saint Mary's Huskies	8
Calgary Dinos	35
Western Ontario Mustangs	11
Laval Rouge et Or	13

46th Vanier Cup
Calgary Dinos	2
Laval Rouge et Or	29

== Awards and Rankings ==
=== Top 10 ===
FRC-CIS Top 10 Rankings
	01	02	03	04	05	06	07	08	09	10
Acadia Axemen	NR	NR	10	14	14	NR	10	NR	14	NR
Mount Allison Mounties	NR	NR	NR	NR	15	NR	NR	14	NR	13
Saint Mary's Huskies	4	4	12	NR	NR	NR	12	10	9	9
St. Francis Xavier X-Men	17	13	NR	NR	NR	NR	NR	NR	NR	NR
Calgary Dinos	1	5	4	4	4	2	2	7	5	5
Regina Rams	12	9	9	6	6	4	4	3	6	8
Saskatchewan Huskies	3	2	6	12	9	8	8	4	3	3
Alberta Golden Bears	16	14	7	7	11	NR	NR	NR	NR	NR
Manitoba Bisons	18	NR	NR	15	NR	NR	NR	NR	NR	NR
UBC Thunderbirds	NR	NR	11	NR	NR	NR	NR	NR	NR	NR
Ottawa Gee-Gees	5	3	2	2	2	6	6	5	4	4
Western Mustangs	9	8	5	5	5	3	3	2	2	2
McMaster Marauders	10	6	8	8	7	9	9	8	7	6
Laurier Golden Hawks	6	11	15	NR	16	10	11	13	11	11
Guelph Gryphons	NR	15	14	10	10	13	14	12	NR	NR
Toronto Varsity Blues	NR	NR	NR	NR	NR	NR	NR	NR	NR	NR
Queen's Golden Gaels	8	NR	13	NR	NR	NR	(15)	NR	NR	NR
Windsor Lancers	NR	NR	NR	NR	NR	NR	NR	NR	NR	NR
York Lions	NR	NR	NR	NR	NR	NR	NR	NR	NR	NR
Laval Rouge et Or	2	1	1	1	1	1	1	1	1	1
Bishop's Gaiters	15	NR	18	9	8	5	5	9	12	12
Montreal Carabins	7	7	3	3	3	7	7	6	8	7
Concordia Stingers	13	10	16	11	12	12	13	NR	13	NR
Sherbrooke Vert et Or	11	12	17	13	13	11	NR	11	10	10
McGill Redmen	14	16	NR	NR	NR	NR	NR	NR	NR	NR

Ranks in italics are teams not ranked in the top 10 poll but received votes. NR = Not ranked, received no votes. Week 2 in CIS poll is Week 1 in Player of the Week poll.

=== Players of the Week ===
FRC-CIS Offensive Player of the Week
	Quebec	Ontario	Atlantic	Canada West	NATIONAL
Week 1	Alexandre Poirier (Sherbrooke)	Matthew Bolduc (Ottawa)	Season Did Not Start	Julian Marchand (Alberta)	Matthew Bolduc (Ottawa)
Week 2	Rotrand Sené (Montreal)	Donnie Marshall (Western)	Stu Clow (Acadia)	Eric Dzwilewski (Calgary)	Rotrand Sené (Montreal)
Week 3	Rotrand Sené (Montreal)	Cyril Adjeitey (Ottawa)	Gary Ross (Mount Allison)	Mark McConkey (Regina)	Mark McConkey (Regina)
Week 4	Rotrand Sené (Montreal)	Giovanni Aprile (Queen's)	Kyle Graves (Acadia)	Laurence Nixon (Saskatchewan)	Laurence Nixon (Saskatchewan)
Week 5	Tristan Grenon (Laval)	Andrew Gillis (Toronto)	Jordan Catterall (St. Francis Xavier)	Marc Mueller (Regina)	Andrew Gillis (Toronto)
Week 6	Jesse Andrews (Bishop's)	Justin Chapdelaine (Queen's)	Kyle Graves (Acadia)	No nominee (bye week)	Justin Chapdelaine (Queen's)
Week 7	Bruno Prud'homme (Laval)	Chris Rossetti (Guelph)	Alonzo Howell (Mount Allison)	Adrian Charles (Regina)	Adrian Charles (Regina)
Week 8	Jean-Philippe Shoiry (Sherbrooke)	Brad Sinopoli (Ottawa)	Craig Leger (Saint Mary's)	Matt Jarvis (Alberta)	Jean-Philippe Shoiry (Sherbrooke)
Week 9	Pascal Lochard (Laval)	Kyle Quinlan (McMaster)	Matt Pickett (Mount Allison)	Laurence Nixon (Saskatchewan)	Laurence Nixon (Saskatchewan)
Week 10	Bruno Prud'Homme (Laval)	Alex Fortier-Labonté (Ottawa)	Scott Kelly (Acadia)	Anthony Parker (Calgary)	Anthony Parker (Calgary)
Week 11	Simon Charbonneau Campeau (Sherbrooke)	Jerimy Hipperson (Western Ontario)	Ahmed Borhot (Saint Mary's)	Erik Glavic (Calgary)	Erik Glavic (Calgary)
Week 12	Sébastian Lévesque (Laval)	Matthew Norman (Western Ontario)	No Nominee	Steven Lumbala (Calgary)	Steven Lumbala (Calgary)

FRC-CIS Defensive Player of the Week
	Quebec	Ontario	Atlantic	Canada West	NATIONAL
Week 1	Max Caron (Concordia)	Sam Sabourin (Queen's)	Season Did Not Start	Steve Famulak (Regina)	Sam Sabourin (Queen's)
Week 2	Julien Hamel (Montreal)	Craig Butler (Western)	Jake Thomas (Acadia)	Nathan Kanya (UBC)	Nathan Kanya (UBC)
Week 3	Frédérick Plesius (Laval)	Adam Fehler (Toronto)	Raye Hartmann (St. Francis Xavier)	Tye Noble (Calgary)	Tye Noble (Calgary)
Week 4	Arnaud Gascon-Nadon (Laval)	Zander Robinson (Western)	Tom Labenski (Acadia)	Bruce Anderson (Regina)	Zander Robinson (Western)
Week 5	Justin Conn (Bishop's)	John Surla (Western)	Dan Schutte (Saint Mary's)	Nico Higgs (Saskatchewan)	Justin Conn (Bishop's)
Week 6	Samaël Lavaud (Laval)	Sam Sabourin (Queen's)	Mark Holden (Saint Mary's)	No nominee (bye week)	Mark Holden (Saint Mary's)
Week 7	Felipe Fonseca (Sherbrooke)	Joe Cappiello (Toronto)	Jeff Hecht (Saint Mary's)	Nico Higgs (Saskatchewan)	Nico Higgs (Saskatchewan)
Week 8	Julien Hamel (Montreal)	Samuel Aird (Wilfrid Laurier)	Adrian Saturley (Acadia)	Jean-Marc Jones (Alberta)	Julien Hamel (Montreal)
Week 9	Dave Boucher (Sherbrooke)	Stephen Cormack (Wilfrid Laurier)	Brian Ridgeway (Saint Mary's)	Teague Sherman (Manitoba)	Dave Boucher (Sherbrooke)
Week 10	Maximilien Ducap Kamara (Laval)	John Surla (Western Ontario)	Graeme Richardson (Acadia)	Craig Gerbrandt (Alberta)	Maximilien Ducap Kamara (Laval)
Week 11	Frédérick Plesius (Laval)	Craig Butler (Western Ontario)	Brian Ridgeway (Saint Mary's)	Linden Gaydosh (Calgary)	Craig Butler (Western Ontario)
Week 12	Olivier Turcotte-Létourneau (Laval)	David Lee (Western Ontario)	No Nominee	Doctor Cassama (Calgary)	Olivier Turcotte-Létourneau (Laval)

FRC-CIS Special Teams Player of the Week
	Quebec	Ontario	Atlantic	Canada West	NATIONAL
Week 1	Jeff Thompson (McGill)	Tyler Crapigna (Mcmaster)	Season Did Not Start	No nominee	Jeff Thompson (McGill)
Week 2	Josh Maveety (Bishop's)	Dan Village (Queen's)	John Szilagyi (Mount Allison)	Nathan Coehoorn (Calgary)	Nathan Coehoorn (Calgary)
Week 3	Austin Anderson (McGill)	Chayce Elliot (Ottawa)	Dylan Hollohan (St. Francis Xavier)	Aaron Ifield (Calgary)	Austin Anderson (McGill)
Week 4	Josh Maveety (Bishop's)	Matthew Falvo (Ottawa)	John Szilagyi (Mount Allison)	Chris Bodnar (Regina)	Chris Bodnar (Regina)
Week 5	Raphaël Gagné (Sherbrooke)	Lirim Hajrullahu (Western)	Jahmeek Taylor (Saint Mary's)	Stephen McDonald (Saskatchewan)	Jahmeek Taylor (Saint Mary's)
Week 6	Christopher Milo (Laval)	Dan Village (Queen's)	Jahmeek Taylor (Saint Mary's)	No nominee (bye week)	Jahmeek Taylor (Saint Mary's)
Week 7	Pierre-Paul Gélinas (Montreal)	Lirim Hajrullahu (Western)	John Szilagyi (Mount Allison)	Luke Thiel (Saskatchewan)	Luke Thiel (Saskatchewan)
Week 8	Christopher Milo (Laval)	Shamawd Chambers (Wilfrid Laurier)	Jahmeek Taylor (Saint Mary's)	Aaron Ifield (Calgary)	Aaron Ifield (Calgary)
Week 9	William Dion (Sherbrooke)	Giancarlo Rapanaro (Wilfrid Laurier)	John Szilagyi (Mount Allison)	Aaron Ifield (Calgary)	William Dion (Sherbrooke)
Week 10	Raphaël Gagné (Laval)	Andrew Thibaudeau (Western Ontario)	Mike Rostance (Acadia)	Anthony Parker (Calgary)	Andrew Thibaudeau (Western Ontario)
Week 11	Christopher Milo (Laval)	Lirim Hajrullahu (Western Ontario)	Brett Lauther (Saint Mary's)	No Nominee	Lirim Hajrullahu (Western Ontario)
Week 12	Christopher Milo (Laval)	Darryl Wheeler (Western Ontario)	Jahmeek Taylor (Saint Mary's)	No Nominee	Christopher Milo (Laval)

=== Post-Season Awards ===
CIS Post-Season Awards
	Quebec	Ontario	Atlantic	Canada West	NATIONAL
Hec Crighton Trophy	Simon Charbonneau Campeau (Sherbrooke)	Brad Sinopoli (Ottawa)	Jahmeek Taylor (Saint Mary's)	Laurence Nixon (Saskatchewan)	Brad Sinopoli (Ottawa)
Presidents' Trophy	Frédérick Plesius (Laval)	Giancarlo Rapanaro (Wilfrid Laurier)	Henoc Muamba (St. Francis-Xavier)	Sam Hurl (Calgary)	Henoc Muamba (St. Francis-Xavier)
J. P. Metras Trophy	Arnod Gascon-Nadon (Laval)	Matt O'Donnell (Queen's)	Adrian Saturley (Acadia)	Paul Swiston (Calgary)	Arnod Gascon-Nadon (Laval)
Peter Gorman Trophy	David Ménard (Montreal)	Sam Sabourin (Queen's)	Jordan Catterall (St. Francis Xavier)	Eric Dzwilewski (Calgary)	Eric Dzwilewski (Calgary)
Russ Jackson Award	Guillaume Saliah (Montreal)	Dillon Heap (Wilfrid Laurier)	Kwame Osai (St. Francis Xavier)	Thomas Hall (Manitoba)	Thomas Hall (Manitoba)
Frank Tindall Trophy	Glen Constantin (Laval)	Greg Marshall (Western Ontario)	Kelly Jeffrey (Mount Allison)	Brian Towriss (Saskatchewan)	Glen Constantin (Laval)

=== All-Canadian Team ===
==== First Team ====
Offence
Brad Sinopoli, QB, Ottawa
Rotrand Sené, RB, Montreal
Adrian Charles, RB, Regina
Simon Charbonneau-Campeau, WR, Sherbrooke
Jade Etienne, WR, Saskatchewan
Matthew Bolduc, IR, Ottawa
Alexandre Poirier, IR, Sherbrooke
Justin Glover, C, McMaster
Matthew O'Donnell, OT, Queen's
Patrick Neufeld, OT, Saskatchewan
Matthew Norman, G, Western Ontario
Ben Heenan, G, Saskatchewan
Defence
Dan Schutte, DT, Saint Mary's
Sébastien Tétreault, DT, Ottawa
Arnaud Gascon-Nadon, DE, Laval
David Ménard, DE, Montreal
Henoc Muamba, LB, St. Francis Xavier
Frédéric Plesius, LB, Laval
Giancarlo Rapanaro, LB, Wilfrid Laurier
Bryce McCall, FS, Saskatchewan
Craig Butler, HB, Western Ontario
Maxime Bérubé, HB, Laval
Jamir Walker, CB, Regina
Bradley Daye, CB, Mount Allison
Special Teams
Christopher Milo, P, Laval
Aaron Ifield, K, Calgary
Raphaël Gagné, RET, Sherbrooke

==== Second Team ====
Offence
Laurence Nixon, QB, Saskatchewan
Nick FitzGibbon, RB, Guelph
Jerimy Hipperson, RB, Western Ontario
Cyril Adjeitey, WR, Ottawa
Adam Molnar, WR, Mount Allison
Liam Mahoney, IR, Concordia
Brenden Owens, IR, Regina
Nicholas Ternovatsky, C, Alberta
Paul Swiston, OT, Calgary
Anthony Barrette, OT, Concordia
Simon Légaré, G, Montreal
Mike Filer, G, Mount Allison
Defence
Benjamin Thompson, DT, McGill
Serge Kaminsky, DT, British Columbia
Zander Robinson, DE, Western Ontario
Adrian Saturley, DE, Acadia
John Surla, LB, Western Ontario
Filipe Fonseca Da Silva, LB, Sherbrooke
Jeff Hecht, LB, Saint Mary's
Julien Hamel, FS, Montreal
Mark Holden, HB, Saint Mary's
Harrison Maloney, HB, Bishop's
Olivier Turcotte-Létourneau, CB, Laval
Chayce Elliot, CB, Ottawa
Special Teams
Darryl Wheeler, P, Western Ontario
Matthew Falvo, K, Ottawa
Jahmeek Taylor, RET, Saint Mary's

== Teams ==
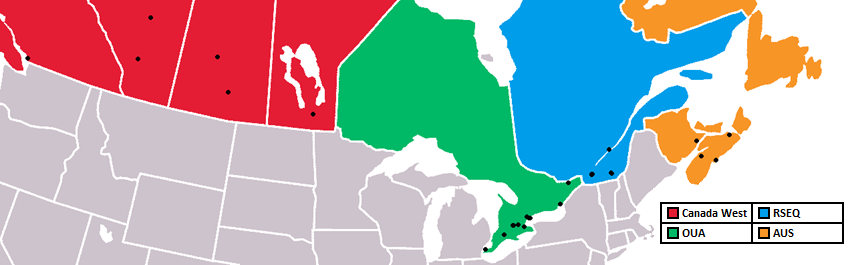

Canada West Football Conference Hardy Trophy
Institution	Team	City	Province	Founded	Affiliation	Enrollment	Endowment	Football stadium	Capacity
University of British Columbia	Thunderbirds	Vancouver	BC	1908	Public	43,579	$1.01B	Thunderbird Stadium	3,500
University of Calgary	Dinos	Calgary	AB	1966	Public	28,196	$444M	McMahon Stadium	35,650
University of Alberta	Golden Bears	Edmonton	AB	1908	Public	36,435	$751M	Foote Field	3,500
University of Saskatchewan	Huskies	Saskatoon	SK	1907	Public	19,082	$136.7M	Griffiths Stadium	4,997
University of Regina	Rams	Regina	SK	1911	Public	12,800	$25.9M	Mosaic Stadium at Taylor Field	30,048
University of Manitoba	Bisons	Winnipeg	MB	1877	Public	27,599	$303M	University Stadium	5,000

Ontario University Athletics Yates Cup
Institution	Team	City	Province	Founded	Affiliation	Enrollment	Endowment	Football stadium	Capacity
University of Windsor	Lancers	Windsor	ON	1857	Public	13,496	$32.5M	South Campus Stadium	2,000
University of Western Ontario	Mustangs	London	ON	1878	Public	30,000	$266.6M	TD Waterhouse Stadium	8,000
Wilfrid Laurier University	Golden Hawks	Waterloo	ON	1911	Public	12,394	---	University Stadium	6,000
University of Guelph	Gryphons	Guelph	ON	1964	Public	19,408	$164.2M	Alumni Stadium	5,100
McMaster University	Marauders	Hamilton	ON	1887	Public	25,688	$498.5M	Ron Joyce Stadium	6,000
University of Toronto	Varsity Blues	Toronto	ON	1827	Public	73,185	$1.823B	Varsity Stadium	5,000
York University	Lions	Toronto	ON	1959	Public	42,400	$306M	York Stadium	2,500
Queen's University	Golden Gaels	Kingston	ON	1841	Public	20,566	$657M	Richardson Stadium	10,258
University of Ottawa	Gee-Gees	Ottawa	ON	1848	Public	35,548	$128.4M	Frank Clair Stadium	26,559

Quebec University Football League Dunsmore Cup
Institution	Team	City	Province	Founded	Affiliation	Enrollment	Endowment	Football stadium	Capacity
Concordia University	Stingers	Montreal	QC	1896	Public	38,809	$54.4M	Concordia Stadium	4,000
Université de Montréal	Carabins	Montreal	QC	1878	Public	55,540	$89.5M	CEPSUM Stadium	5,100
McGill University	Redmen	Montreal	QC	1821	Public	32,514	$973.6M	Molson Stadium	25,012
Université Laval	Rouge et Or	Quebec City	QC	1663	Public	37,591	$105.3M	PEPS Stadium	10,200
Université de Sherbrooke	Vert et Or	Sherbrooke	QC	1954	Public	35,000	---	Université de Sherbrooke Stadium	8,000
Bishop's University	Gaiters	Sherbrooke	QC	1843	Public	1,817	---	Coulter Field	3,000

Atlantic University Football Conference Jewett Trophy
Institution	Team	City	Province	Founded	Affiliation	Enrollment	Endowment	Football stadium	Capacity
Acadia University	Axemen	Wolfville	NS	1838	Public	3,621	$40M	Raymond Field	3,000
Mount Allison University	Mounties	Sackville	NB	1839	Public	2,486	$82.8M	MacAulay Field	2,500
Saint Francis Xavier University	X-Men	Antigonish	NS	1853	Public	4,875	$59.4M	Oland Stadium	4,000
Saint Mary's University	Huskies	Halifax	NS	1802	Public	7,281	$16.9M	Huskies Stadium	4,000
