= 2009 Saskatchewan Huskies football team =

College football season

2009 Saskatchewan Huskies football
- Conference: Canada West Universities Athletic Association
- Record: 8–1 (7–1 Canada West)
- Head coach: Brian Towriss
- Offensive coordinator: Mike Harrington; Travis Serke; Bart Arnold; Brent Schneider; Jason Sulz
- Defensive coordinator: Ed Carleton; Darrell Burko; Wade Dupont; Aaron Moser; Doug Humbert
- Home stadium: Griffiths Stadium

Uniform

2009 Canada West standings
	Conf				Playoff Spot
Team (Rank)	W		L	PTS	Playoff Spot
#3 Saskatchewan	7	-	1	14	†
#2 Calgary	7	-	1	14	X
Alberta	4	-	4	8	X
Regina	3	-	5	6	X
UBC^{b}	3	-	5	6	
Manitoba^{c}	2	-	5	4	
Simon Fraser^{a}	1	-	6	2	
† – Conference Champion; Rankings: CIS Top 10 (Nov 3)^{a} - Forfeited 2 wins for ineligible player.^{b} - Awarded a win over Simon Fraser due to the Clan using an ineligible player.^{c} - Forfeited 3 wins for ineligible player.

The 2009 Saskatchewan Huskies football team represented the University of Saskatchewan in the 2009 CIS university football season. They played their home games at Griffiths Stadium in Saskatoon, Saskatchewan. The team went into the season hoping to rebound from a disappointing loss to the Simon Fraser Clan in the Canada West Semi-Final.

== Rankings ==
	Pre	Wk 1	Wk 2	Wk 3	Wk 4	Wk 5	Wk 6	Wk 7	Wk 8	Wk 9	Final
CIS Football Top 10	4	4	3	3	3	7	7	7	5	3	3

== Preseason ==
Date	Time	Opponent	Rank	Site	Result	Attendance
08/28/2009	7:00 pm	Alberta Golden Bears*	No. 4	Griffiths Stadium; Saskatoon, SK	W 26-21	2,130
*Non-conference game; Rankings from CIS Football Top 10 Poll released prior to the game; All times are in Central time

== Schedule ==
The schedule is as follows:

Date	Time	Opponent	Rank	Site	TV	Result	Attendance
09/04/2009	7:00 pm	No. 3 Calgary Dinos^{†}	No. 4	Griffiths Stadium; Saskatoon, SK	Shaw TV	W 34-33 ^{2OT}	6,053
09/11/2009	7:00 pm	Regina Rams	No. 3	Griffiths Stadium; Saskatoon, SK (Saskatchewan Sports Hall of Fame Game)	Sasktel Local on Demand	W 10-9	6,090
09/25/2009	7:00 pm	Alberta Golden Bears	No. 3	Foote Field; Edmonton, AB		L 27-7	1,709
10/02/2009	8:00 pm	Simon Fraser Clan	No. 7	Terry Fox Field; Burnaby, BC		W 24-18 ^{2OT}	1,200
10/09/2009	7:00 pm	UBC Thunderbirds	No. 7	Griffiths Stadium; Saskatoon, SK	Shaw TV	W 44-7	2,020
10/17/2009	11:00 am	Manitoba Bisons	No. 7	University Stadium; Winnipeg, MB	Shaw TV	W 31-11	500
10/23/2009	7:00 pm	Alberta Golden Bears	No. 5	Griffiths Stadium; Saskatoon, SK		W 39-3	3,317
10/30/2009	7:00 pm	Regina Rams	No. 3	Mosaic Stadium at Taylor Field; Regina, SK	Sasktel Local On Demand	W 42-17	1,380
^{†}Homecoming; Rankings from CIS Football Top 10 Poll released prior to the game; All times are in Central time

== Playoffs ==
Date	Time	Opponent	Rank	Site	TV	Result	Attendance
11/07/2009	1:00 pm	Regina Rams	No. 3	Griffiths Stadium; Saskatoon, SK (Canada West Semi-Final)		W 53-23	4,482
11/14/2009	1:00 pm	No. 2 Calgary Dinos	No. 3	Griffiths Stadium; Saskatoon, SK (Canada West Hardy Cup Final)	Shaw TV	L 39-38	5,163
Rankings from CIS Football Top 10 Poll released prior to the game; All times are in Central time

== Radio ==
All Huskies football games will be carried on CK750. The radio announcers are Darryl Skender and Kelly Bowers.

== Roster ==
2009 Saskatchewan Huskies roster
Quarterbacks: 9 Trevor Barss Third Year; 11 Laurence Nixon Fourth Year; 6 Parker Siemens Second Year; Running backs: 20 Alex Baloguin Second Year FB; 34 Jeff Hassler First Year; -- Terrell Klassen First Year; 21 Mark Klause First Year; 7 Tyler O'Gorman Fifth Year; -- Ben Randall First Year; -- Devin Sapara First Year; 30 Dathan Thomas Fourth Year; Wide receivers: 4 Nick Baldwin Second Year; 4 Garrett Burgess First Year; 75 Jade Etienne Second Year; 18 Travis Gorski Fourth Year; 17 Cory Jones Fifth Year; 2 Rory Kohlert Third Year; -- Adam Nesbitt First Year; -- Matthew Pfeifer Second Year; Slotbacks: 25 Garrett Bolen First Year; -- Andrew Breker First Year; 71 Shayne Dueck Third Year; 19 Braeden George Second Year; 70 Scott McHenry Fifth Year; 78 Jeffrey Moore Second Year; 8 Matt Walker First Year	Offensive linemen: 55 Hubert Buydens Fifth Year; 64 Micheal Fuller Second Year; 67 Evan Greff First Year; 59 Burton Haig First Year; 48 Ben Heenan Second Year; 61 Darcy Hinds Second Year; 65 Darren Hinds Fourth Year; 68 Ryan Kemp First Year; 68 Braden Kolybaba Third Year; 67 Jarod Koroll Third Year; 62 Brandon Myre Third Year; 58 Brad Nehring First Year; 66 Patrick Neufeld Third Year; 47 Cam Redl First Year; -- Mark Roney First Year; -- Matthew Rozdilsky First Year; Defensive linemen: -- Tololima Auva'a First Year; -- Alex Burko First Year; -- Justin deMontarnal First Year; 44 Zachary Hart First Year; -- Colton Jensen First Year; 60 Carter Kolybaba First Year; 63 Stephen Kovach First Year; 42 Kyle Kuzek Fourth Year; 51 Vaughan Rice Fourth Year DE; 56 David Rybinski Second Year; 77 Joel Seutter First Year DE; 42 Levi Steinhauer First Year; -- Nathan Wielgoz First Year; 46 Craig Woloshyn Second Year	Linebackers: 45 Lyndon Boychuk Fourth Year; 32/37 Stephen Dereniwski First Year; 32 Eric Grisdale Fourth Year; -- Thomas Hilderman First Year; 39 Rylund Hunter Third Year; 37 Tony Michalchuk Third Year; -- Charlie Power First Year; 29 Brody Rothe First Year; 31 Peter Thiel Second Year; 54 Taylor Wallace Fifth Year; Defensive backs: -- Andrew Abbs First Year; 3 Alex Adams Third Year; 12 Jimi Cabylis Fourth Year; 23 Anthony Dudar Third Year; 24 Mitch Friesen Second Year; 35 Cody Halseth Fourth Year; 26 Nico Higgs Second Year; -- Zachary Horsman First Year; 28 Harley Irwin Third Year; 14 Jon Krahenbil Fifth Year; 15 Connor Lutz First Year; 5 Keenan MacDougall Second Year; 27 Bryce McCall Second Year; 1 Nnamdi Metu Fourth Year; 22 Seamus Neary First Year; -- Derek Oleksyn First Year; 10 Grant Shaw Fourth Year; 30 Luke Thiel First Year; Special teams: -- Stephen McDonald First Year P/K; 10 Grant Shaw Fourth Year P/K; updated 2009-09-11

== Awards ==
Regular Season
Date	Player	Award
September 8, 2009	Bryce McCall	Canada West Defensive Player of the Week
September 8, 2009	Travis Gorski	Canada West Special Teams Player of the Week
October 19, 2009	Grant Shaw	Canada West Special Teams Player of the Week
October 26, 2009	Grant Shaw	Canada West Special Teams Player of the Week
November 2, 2009	Jeff Hassler	Canada West Offensive Player of the Week
November 9, 2009	Cory Jones	Canada West Offensive Player of the Week

Postseason
Date	Player	Award
November 10, 2009	Patrick Neufeld	Canada West All-Star Offensive Tackle
November 10, 2009	Hubert Buydens	Canada West All-Star Offensive Guard
November 10, 2009	Grant Shaw	Canada West All-Star Cornerback
November 10, 2009	Taylor Wallace	Canada West All-Star Linebacker
November 12, 2009	Taylor Wallace	Canada West Most Outstanding Defensive Player

== 2010 CFL draft Choices ==
Rnd.	Pick #	CFL team	Player	Pos.	School	Conf.	Notes
2	11	Toronto Argonauts	Grant Shaw	DB	Saskatchewan	CWUAA	
5	33	Saskatchewan Roughriders	Patrick Neufeld	OL	Saskatchewan	CWUAA	
