= 2010 Saskatchewan Huskies football team =

Football team

2010 Saskatchewan Huskies football
- Conference: Canada West Universities Athletic Association
- Record: 7–2 (6–2 Canada West)
- Head coach: Brian Towriss
- Offensive coordinator: Mike Harrington; Travis Serke; Bart Arnold; Brent Schneider; Jason Sulz
- Defensive coordinator: Ed Carleton; Darrell Burko; Wade Dupont; Aaron Moser; Doug Humbert
- Home stadium: Griffiths Stadium

Uniform

2010 Canada West standings
| Team (Rank) | W | | L | PTS | Playoff Spot |
|---|---|---|---|---|---|
| #3 Saskatchewan | 6 | - | 2 | 12 | † |
| #5 Calgary | 6 | - | 2 | 10 | X |
| #8 Regina | 5 | - | 3 | 10 | X |
| Alberta | 3 | - | 5 | 6 | X |
| Manitoba | 2 | - | 6 | 4 | |
| UBC | 2 | - | 6 | 4 | |
† – Conference Champion; Rankings: CIS Top 10 (Nov 2)

The 2010 Saskatchewan Huskies football team represented the University of Saskatchewan in the 2010 CIS university football season. They played their home games at Griffiths Stadium in Saskatoon, Saskatchewan. The team had lost to the Calgary Dinos in the 2009 Canada West Final, in the previous season.

== Rankings ==
| | Pre | Wk 1 | Wk 2 | Wk 3 | Wk 4 | Wk 5 | Wk 6 | Wk 7 | Wk 8 | Wk 9 | Final |
|---|---|---|---|---|---|---|---|---|---|---|---|
| CIS Football Top 10 | 3 | 2 | 6 | RV | 9 | 8 | 8 | 4 | 3 | 3 | 3 |

RV - Received Votes

== Preseason ==
| Date | Time | Opponent | Site | Result | Attendance |
|---|---|---|---|---|---|
| 08/27/2010 | 7:00 pm | Western Ontario Mustangs* | Griffiths Stadium; Saskatoon, SK | W 40-10 | 4,125 |
*Non-conference game; All times are in Central time

== Schedule ==
The schedule is as follows:

| Date | Time | Opponent | Rank | Site | TV | Result | Attendance |
|---|---|---|---|---|---|---|---|
| 09/04/2010 | 7:00 pm | No. 1 Calgary Dinos | No. 3 | McMahon Stadium; Calgary, AB | Shaw TV | W 34-13 | 2,074 |
| 09/10/2010 | 7:00 pm | UBC Thunderbirds^{†} | No. 2 | Griffiths Stadium; Saskatoon, SK (Homecoming Game) | | L 31-12 | 5,138 |
| 09/18/2010 | 7:00 pm | No. 9 Regina Rams | No. 6 | Mosaic Stadium at Taylor Field; Regina, SK (Saskatchewan Sports Hall of Fame Game) | Sasktel Local On Demand | L 37-26 | 3,750 |
| 09/24/2010 | 7:00 pm | No. 7 Alberta Golden Bears | | Foote Field; Edmonton, AB | | W 33-9 | 2,000 |
| 10/01/2010 | 7:00 pm | Manitoba Bisons | No. 9 | Griffiths Stadium; Saskatoon, SK (Great Western Showdown) | | W 64-3 | 5,455 |
| 10/15/2010 | 7:00 pm | No. 2 Calgary Dinos | No. 8 | Griffiths Stadium; Saskatoon, SK (Blackout Game) | Shaw TV | W 34-17 | 4,450 |
| 10/22/2010 | 8:00 pm | UBC Thunderbirds | No. 4 | Thunderbird Stadium; Vancouver, BC | | W 30-9 | 453 |
| 10/29/2010 | 7:00 pm | No. 6 Regina Rams | No. 3 | Griffiths Stadium; Saskatoon, SK (Provincial Rivalry Game) | Shaw TV | W 52-29 | 3,824 |
^{†}Homecoming; Rankings from CIS Football Top 10 Poll released prior to the game; All times are in Central time

== Playoffs ==
| Date | Time | Opponent | Rank | Site | Result | Attendance |
|---|---|---|---|---|---|---|
| 11/06/2010 | 1:00 pm | Alberta Golden Bears | No. 3 | Griffiths Stadium; Saskatoon, SK (Canada West Semi-Final) | L 31-30 | 3,921 |
Rankings from CIS Football Top 10 Poll released prior to the game; All times are in Central time

== Radio ==
All Huskies football games will be carried on CK750. The radio announcers are Darryl Skender and Kelly Bowers.

== Roster ==
Saskatchewan Huskies roster
| Quarterbacks: 7 Jahlani Gilbert-Knorren First Year; -- Josh Huschi First Year; 11 Laurence Nixon Fifth Year; 12 Trent Peterson First Year; 6 Parker Siemens Second Year; Running backs: 20 Jeremy Andrew First Year; 20 Alex Balogun Third Year FB; -- Shane Buchanan First Year; 3 Ben Coakwell Third Year; 34 Jeff Hassler Second Year; -- Dexter Janke First Year; 15 Connor Lutz Second Year; 38 Devin Sapara First Year; 30 Dathan Thomas Fifth Year; Wide receivers: 21 Garrett Burgess Second Year; -- Reid Coleman First Year; -- Shayne Dueck Fourth Year; 75 Jade Etienne Third Year; 18 Travis Gorski Fifth Year; -- James Jackins First Year; 2 Rory Kohlert Fourth Year; 9 Mitch Stevens Second Year; Slotbacks: 25 Garrett Bolen Second Year; 70 Owen Geier Fifth Year; 19 Braeden George Third Year; -- Josh Haslam First Year; 78 Jeffrey Moore Third Year; 8 Matt Walker Second Year | Offensive linemen: -- Mathew Czerniak First Year; 64 Michael Fuller Second Year; 58 Dale Furber Fifth Year; 67 Evan Greff First Year; 54 Burton Haig Second Year; 48 Ben Heenan First Year; 61 Darcy Hinds Third Year; 65 Darren Hinds Fifth Year; 68 Ryan Kemp Fourth Year; 62 Brandon Myre Third Year; 55 Brad Nehring First Year; 66 Patrick Neufeld Fourth Year; 47 Cam Redl Second Year; -- Logan Wilk First Year; Defensive linemen: -- Tololima Auva'a First Year; 59 Alexander Burko First Year; -- Joey Deason First Year; -- Taylor Garrett First Year; -- Bryce Gorman First Year; 44 Zach Hart Second Year; 60 Carter Kolybaba Third Year; 63 Stephen Kovach Third Year; 51 Vaughan Rice Fifth Year DE; 56 David Rybinski Third Year; 42 Ben Rush Second Year; 77 Joel Seutter Second Year; 71 Levi Steinhauer Second Year DE; 46 Craig Woloshyn Third Year | Linebackers: 4 Dane Bishop First Year; -- Jason Briggs First Year; 26 Nico Higgs Fourth Year; 36 Thomas Hilderman First Year; 39 Rylund Hunter Third Year; -- Kody Kipp First Year; -- John Malcolm First Year; 37 Tony Michalchuk Fourth Year; 45 Ronald Mwamba First Year; 35 Charlie Power First Year; 29 Brodie Rothe Second Year; 31 Peter Thiel Third Year; Defensive backs: 23 Andrew Abbs First Year; 67 Justin deMontarnal First Year; 24 Mitch Friesen Third Year; 17 Cody Halseth Fifth Year; -- Zachary Horsman First Year; 28 Harley Irwin Fourth Year; 1 Michael King First Year; 27 Bryce McCall Third Year; 10 Keenan MacDougall Third Year; 1 Nnamdi Metu Fifth Year; 22 Seamus Neary Second Year; 28 Derek Oleksyn First Year; -- Adam Schwinghammer First Year; -- Jeremy Sroka First Year; 5 Luke Thiel Second Year; -- Kent Walters First Year; 14 Gregg Woytowich Third Year; Special teams: 32 Denton Kolodzinski First Year P/K; 16 Stephen McDonald Second Year P/K; updated 2010-10-15 |

== Game notes ==
=== Vs. Western Ontario ===
Western Ontario at Saskatchewan

| Team | 1 | 2 | 3 | 4 | Total |
|---|---|---|---|---|---|
| Mustangs | 0 | 10 | 2 | 0 | 12 |
| • Huskies | 2 | 3 | 7 | 28 | 40 |

- Date: August 27
- Location: Griffiths Stadium
  Saskatoon, SK
- Game start: 7:00 PM CST
- Elapsed time: 3:00
- Game attendance: 4,125
- Game weather: 20°C, Sunny, Wind: W 31 KM/H
- Referee: Mike Thorson

=== Vs. Calgary ===
Saskatchewan at Calgary

| Team | 1 | 2 | 3 | 4 | Total |
|---|---|---|---|---|---|
| • #3 Huskies | 17 | 8 | 0 | 9 | 34 |
| #1 Dinos | 7 | 6 | 0 | 0 | 13 |

- Date: September 4
- Location: McMahon Stadium
  Calgary, AB
- Game start: 7:00 PM MST
- Elapsed time: 3:10
- Game attendance: 2,074
- Game weather: 14°C, Rainy, Wind: N 35 KM/H
- Referee: Jim Woods
- TV announcers (Shaw TV): Jim Mullin (Play by play), Mike Siroishka (Colour), Brendan Parker (Sideline)

=== Vs. UBC ===
UBC at Saskatchewan

| Team | 1 | 2 | 3 | 4 | Total |
|---|---|---|---|---|---|
| • Thunderbirds | 7 | 10 | 3 | 11 | 31 |
| #2 Huskies | 1 | 3 | 1 | 7 | 12 |

- Date: September 10
- Location: Griffiths Stadium
  Saskatoon, SK
- Game start: 7:00 PM CST
- Elapsed time: 2:38
- Game attendance: 5,138
- Game weather: 10°C, Light Drizzle, Wind: NW 30 KM/H
- Referee: Bob Dumonceaux

=== Vs. Regina ===
Saskatchewan at Regina

| Team | 1 | 2 | 3 | 4 | Total |
|---|---|---|---|---|---|
| #6 Huskies | 3 | 10 | 0 | 13 | 26 |
| • #9 Rams | 6 | 17 | 14 | 0 | 37 |

- Date: September 18
- Location: Mosaic Stadium at Taylor Field
  Regina, SK
- Game start: 7:00 PM CST
- Elapsed time: 3:04
- Game attendance: 3,750
- Game weather: 10°C, Partly cloudy, Wind: S 6 KM/H
- Referee: Dennis Zwarych
- TV announcers (Sasktel Local On Demand): Heath Mulligan (Play by play), Tyler O'Gorman (Colour), Devin Heroux (Sideline)

=== Vs. Alberta ===
Saskatchewan at Alberta

| Team | 1 | 2 | 3 | 4 | Total |
|---|---|---|---|---|---|
| • Huskies | 9 | 7 | 8 | 9 | 33 |
| #7 Golden Bears | 3 | 0 | 0 | 6 | 9 |

- Date: September 24
- Location: Foote Field
  Edmonton, AB
- Game start: 7:00 PM MST
- Elapsed time: 2:37
- Game attendance: 2,000
- Game weather: 17°C, Sunny, Wind: WSW 8 KM/H
- Referee: Kelly Edgeworth

=== Vs. Manitoba ===
Manitoba at Saskatchewan

| Team | 1 | 2 | 3 | 4 | Total |
|---|---|---|---|---|---|
| Bisons | 0 | 0 | 0 | 3 | 3 |
| • #9 Huskies | 24 | 20 | 11 | 9 | 64 |

- Date: October 1
- Location: Griffiths Stadium
  Saskatoon, SK
- Game start: 7:00 PM CST
- Elapsed time: 2:53
- Game attendance: 5,455
- Game weather: 14°C, Fair, Wind: SE 19 KM/H
- Referee: Al Mitchell

=== Vs. Calgary ===
Calgary at Saskatchewan

| Team | 1 | 2 | 3 | 4 | Total |
|---|---|---|---|---|---|
| #2 Dinos | 3 | 2 | 5 | 7 | 17 |
| • #8 Huskies | 7 | 6 | 7 | 16 | 36 |

- Date: October 15
- Location: Griffiths Stadium
  Saskatoon, SK
- Game start: 7:00 PM CST
- Elapsed time: 2:58
- Game attendance: 4,450
- Game weather: 7°C, Partly Cloudy, Wind: W 24 KM/H
- Referee: Al Mitchell
- TV announcers (Shaw TV): Jim Mullin (Play by play), Wray Morrison (Colour)

=== Vs. UBC ===
Saskatchewan at UBC

| Team | 1 | 2 | 3 | 4 | Total |
|---|---|---|---|---|---|
| • #4 Huskies | 3 | 13 | 0 | 14 | 30 |
| Thunderbirds | 0 | 3 | 0 | 6 | 9 |

- Date: October 22
- Location: Thunderbird Stadium
  Vancouver, BC
- Game start: 7:00 PM PST
- Elapsed time: 2:40
- Game attendance: 453
- Game weather: 12°C, Overcast

=== Vs. Regina ===
Regina at Saskatchewan

| Team | 1 | 2 | 3 | 4 | Total |
|---|---|---|---|---|---|
| #6 Rams | 7 | 0 | 7 | 15 | 29 |
| • #3 Huskies | 14 | 21 | 7 | 10 | 52 |

- Date: October 29
- Location: Griffiths Stadium
  Saskatoon, SK
- Game start: 7:00 PM CST
- Elapsed time: 3:08
- Game attendance: 3,824
- Game weather: −3 °C, A few clouds, Wind: W 7 KM/H
- Referee: Rob Dumonceaux
- TV announcers (Shaw TV): Wray Morrison, Daved Benefield, Dave Thomas (Sideline)

=== Vs. Alberta ===
Alberta at Saskatchewan

| Team | 1 | 2 | 3 | 4 | Total |
|---|---|---|---|---|---|
| • Golden Bears | 0 | 3 | 7 | 21 | 31 |
| #3 Huskies | 3 | 6 | 21 | 0 | 30 |

- Date: November 6
- Location: Griffiths Stadium
  Saskatoon, SK
- Game start: 1:00 PM CST
- Elapsed time: 2:51
- Game attendance: 3,921
- Game weather: 7°C, Sunny, a few Clouds, Wind: NE 6KM/H
- Referee: Jim Woods

== Awards ==
Regular Season
| Date | Player | Award |
| September 27, 2010 | Laurence Nixon | Canada West Offensive Player of the Week; CIS Offensive Player of the Week |
| October 4, 2010 | Nico Higgs | Canada West Defensive Player of the Week |
| October 4, 2010 | Stephen McDonald | Canada West Special Teams Player of the Week |
| October 18, 2010 | Nico Higgs | Canada West Defensive Player of the Week; CIS Defensive Player of the Week |
| October 18, 2010 | Luke Thiel | Canada West Special Teams Player of the Week; CIS Special Teams Player of the Week |
| November 1, 2010 | Laurence Nixon | Canada West Offensive Player of the Week |
| November 2, 2010 | Laurence Nixon | CIS Offensive Player of the Week |

Post Season
| Date | Player | Award |
| November 10, 2010 | Laurence Nixon | Canada West All-Star Quarterback |
| November 10, 2010 | Jade Etienne | Canada West All-Star Wide Receiver |
| November 10, 2010 | Patrick Neufeld | Canada West All-Star Offensive Tackle |
| November 10, 2010 | Ben Heenan | Canada West All-Star Offensive Guard |
| November 10, 2010 | Bryce McCall | Canada West All-Star Safety |
| November 10, 2010 | Peter Thiel | Canada West All-Star Linebacker |
| November 10, 2010 | Zach Hart | Canada West All-Star Defensive End |
| November 10, 2010 | Luke Thiel | Canada West All-Star Kick Returner |
| November 12, 2010 | Laurence Nixon | Canada West Frank Gnup Memorial Trophy (Player of the Year) |
| November 12, 2010 | Brian Towriss | Canada West Coach of the Year |

== 2011 CFL draft Choices ==
| Rnd. | Pick # | CFL team | Player | Pos. | School | Conf. | Notes |
|---|---|---|---|---|---|---|---|
| 1 | 4 | Winnipeg Blue Bombers | Jade Etienne | WR | Saskatchewan | CWUAA | |

== 2011 East West Bowl Selections ==
| Player | Position |
|---|---|
| Ben Heenan | OL |
| Bryce McCall | DB |
| Keenan MacDougall | DB |
| Brian Towriss | Head coach |
