= 46th Vanier Cup =

2010 Canadian university football championship

Calgary Dinos	Laval Rouge et Or
(6–2)	(9–0)
2	29
Head coach: Blake Nill	Head coach: Glen Constantin
	1	2	3	4	Total
Calgary Dinos	0	2	0	0	2
Laval Rouge et Or	17	9	0	3	29
- Date: November 27, 2010
- Stadium: PEPS Stadium
- Location: Quebec City
- Ted Morris Memorial Trophy: Sébastien Lévesque
- Bruce Coulter Award: Marc-Antoine Beaudoin-Cloutier
- Attendance: 16,237

Broadcasters
- Network: TSN, Radio Canada

The 46th Vanier Cup took place on November 27, 2010, at PEPS Stadium in Quebec City, Quebec, determining the CIS Football champions for 2010. The Laval Rouge et Or defeated the Calgary Dinos 29–2 to win their sixth national title in twelve years. Including the playoffs, the Rouge et Or won thirteen games, a single season record. Laval's defence held Calgary to 147 yards on offence; the Dinos' only points came on a conceded safety in the second quarter.

Sébastien Lévesque won the Ted Morris Memorial Trophy as Most Valuable Player, rushing for 168 yards and one touchdown. On defence, the Bruce Coulter Award went to Marc-Antoine Beaudoin-Cloutier, who recorded 4.5 tackles and a sack.

== Game summary ==
Calgary Dinos (2) - safety touch.

Laval Rouge et Or (29) - TDs, Sébastien Lévesque, Yannick Morin-Plante; FGs Christopher Milo (5); cons., Milo (2).

=== Scoring summary ===
First Quarter
LAV - TD Lévesque 41 run (Milo convert) (4:27) 7 - 0 LAV
LAV - TD Morin-Plante 40 pass from Prud'homme (Milo convert) (7:43) 14 - 0 LAV
LAV - FG Milo 12 (13:39) 17 - 0 LAV
Second Quarter
CGY - Safety Team, Milo concedes (4:09) 17 - 2 LAV
LAV - FG Milo 24 (6:46) 20 - 2 LAV
LAV - FG Milo 23 (10:49) 23 - 2 LAV
LAV - FG Milo 27 (14:49) 26 - 2 LAV
Third Quarter
No Scoring
Fourth Quarter
LAV - FG Milo 18 (13:29) 29 - 2 LAV

=== Notable game facts ===
- In what was statistically the most commanding defensive effort in Vanier Cup history, the Rouge et Or held the Dinos offence to just 140 net yards, bettering the previous Vanier Cup mark of 161 net yards allowed by the Guelph Gryphons in their 1984 victory over the Mount Allison Mounties.
- Laval became just the second school to win a Vanier Cup game in their home city, following the Toronto Varsity Blues, who won championships at Varsity Stadium in 1965 and at SkyDome (now the Rogers Centre) in 1993.
- Calgary completed its third straight campaign with a defeat at PEPS Stadium, having lost both the 2008 Uteck Bowl to Laval and 2009 Vanier Cup to the Queen's Golden Gaels in Quebec City.
- Laval won a third Vanier Cup against head coach Blake Nill. The first two occurrences happened in 1999 and 2003 while Nill was coaching the Saint Mary's Huskies.
- After their win, the Laval Rouge et Or have now won six national titles, tied for first overall with the Western Ontario Mustangs. However, Laval is undefeated in six games, whereas Western has won six games and lost six games.
- With this title, Glen Constantin becomes the first to win 5 Vanier Cup titles as head coach. Peter Connellan, former Calgary head coach, comes second with 4 wins.

=== Championships ===
The Vanier Cup is played between the champions of the Mitchell Bowl and the Uteck Bowl, the national semi-final games. In 2010, according to the rotating schedule, the Dunsmore Cup Quebec championship team will meet the Ontario conference's Yates Cup champion for the Uteck Bowl. The winners of the Canada West conference Hardy Trophy will host the Atlantic conference Loney Bowl champions for the Mitchell Bowl.

==== Playoff bracket ====
Conference Quarter-finals
Queen's Golden Gaels	19
McMaster Marauders	40
Guelph Gryphons	10
Wilfrid Laurier Golden Hawks	42

Conference Semi-finals
Acadia Axemen	22
Mount Allison Mounties	14
Alberta Golden Bears	31
Saskatchewan Huskies	30
Regina Rams	33
Calgary Dinos	40
McMaster Marauders	28
Western Ontario Mustangs	34
Wilfrid Laurier Golden Hawks	31
Ottawa Gee-Gees	32
Sherbrooke Vert et Or	33
Montreal Carabins	26
Bishop's Gaiters	1
Laval Rouge et Or	56

Conference Championships
Acadia Axemen	8
Saint Mary's Huskies	37
Alberta Golden Bears	3
Calgary Dinos	56
Western Ontario Mustangs	26
Ottawa Gee-Gees	25
Sherbrooke Vert et Or	17
Laval Rouge et Or	22

National Semi-finals
Saint Mary's Huskies	8
Calgary Dinos	35
Western Ontario Mustangs	11
Laval Rouge et Or	13

46th Vanier Cup
Calgary Dinos	2
Laval Rouge et Or	29
