= Alex Adams =

Alex or Alexander Adams may refer to:

== People ==
- Alexander Adams (British Army officer) (c. 1772–1834), lieutenant-general in the British Army
- Alexander Adams (sailor) (1780–1871), Scotsman who served in the Royal Navy and the navy of the Kingdom of Hawaii
- Alexander James Adams (born 1962), American singer, musician and songwriter
- Alex Adams (basketball) (1934–2011), American basketball coach
- Alex Adams (cricketer) (born 1975), Anguillan cricketer
- Alex Adams (Canadian football), coach of the 2009 Saskatchewan Huskies football team
- Alex Adams (madam) (1933 or 1934–1995), alternative name of Elizabeth Adams, also known as Madam Alex, Hollywood madam

== Fictional characters ==
- Alex Adams (Holby City) (active 2000–03), in the British medical drama series Holby City
