= Atlantic University Sport =

Canadian athletics organization

Atlantic University Sport Sport universitaire de l'Atlantique
- Association: U Sports
- Founded: 1974; 52 years ago
- Commissioner: John Keefe (Interim)
- Division: 1
- No. of teams: 11 (+ 1 football-only associate)
- Headquarters: Halifax, Nova Scotia
- Website: atlanticuniversitysport.com

Atlantic University Sport (AUS; French: Sport universitaire de l'Atlantique) is a regional membership association for universities in Atlantic Canada which assists in co-ordinating competition between their university level athletic programs and providing contact information, schedules, results, and releases about those programs and events to the public and the media. This is similar to what would be called a college athletic conference in the United States. The AUS, which covers Canada east of the province of Quebec, is one of four such bodies that are members of the country's governing body for university athletics, U Sports. The other three regional associations coordinating university-level sports in Canada are Ontario University Athletics (OUA), the Canada West Universities Athletic Association (CW), and the Réseau du sport étudiant du Québec (RSEQ).

== History ==
The Atlantic Universities Athletics Association was founded in 1974, with the merging of the Atlantic Intercollegiate Athletic Association and the Atlantic Women's Intercollegiate Athletic Association. Prior to the acceptance of Memorial University of Newfoundland, the AIAA, which dates back to the late 19th century, was known as the Maritime Intercollegiate Athletic Association. The AUAA changed its name to Atlantic University Sport (AUS) in 1999.

== Member schools ==
=== Full members ===
Institution	Nickname	Location	Founded	Joined	Type	Enrollment	Endowment
Acadia University	Axemen/Axewomen	Wolfville, Nova Scotia	1838	1974	Public	3,621	$40M
Cape Breton University	Capers	Sydney, Nova Scotia	1951	1982	Public	3,107	$6.1M
Dalhousie University	Tigers	Halifax, Nova Scotia	1818	1974	Public	15,970	$337.7M
Memorial University of Newfoundland	Sea-Hawks	St. John's, Newfoundland	1925	1974	Public	18,172	$93M
Mount Allison University	Mounties	Sackville, New Brunswick	1839	1974	Public	2,486	$215.1M
Université de Moncton	Aigles Bleus/Aigles Bleues	Moncton, New Brunswick	1864	1974	Public	6,219	---
University of New Brunswick	Reds	Fredericton, New Brunswick	1785	1974	Public	10,587	---
University of Prince Edward Island	Panthers	Charlottetown, Prince Edward Island	1969	1974	Public	4,435	---
Saint Mary's University	Huskies	Halifax, Nova Scotia	1802	1974	Public	7,281	$16.9M
St. Francis Xavier University	X-Men/X-Women	Antigonish, Nova Scotia	1853	1974	Public	4,875	$59.4M
St. Thomas University	Tommies	Fredericton, New Brunswick	1910	1974	Public	2,579	---

=== Former members ===
The AUS accepted its first ever single-sport member at the start of the 2017–18 school year, when the Bishop's Gaiters football team transferred from the Réseau du sport étudiant du Québec (RSEQ). However, on November 24, 2025, citing rising costs in interprovincial travels between Quebec and Atlantic Canada, the AUS announced that Bishop's will leave the conference to return to the RSEQ.

Institution	Nickname	Location	Founded	Joined	Left	Type	Enrollment	Endowment	Sport	Primary league
Bishop's University	Gaiters	Sherbrooke, Quebec	1843	2017	2025	Public	2,756	$32.5M	Football	RSEQ

=== Member maps ===
Locations of the Nova Scotia and PEI based Atlantic University Sport member institutions	Locations of the New Brunswick based Atlantic University Sport member institutions	Locations of the Newfoundland based Atlantic University Sport member institution

== Facilities ==
Facilities
Institution	Football Field	Seated Capacity	Basketball/Volleyball Gym	Seated Capacity	Hockey Arena	Seated Capacity	Soccer Stadium	Seated Capacity
Acadia	Raymond Field	3,000	War Memorial Gymnasium	1,800	Andrew H. McCain Arena	2,300	Raymond Field	3,000
Cape Breton	Non-football school		Sullivan Field House	2,200	Non-hockey school		Ness Timmons Soccer Field	2,000
Dalhousie	Non-football school		Sexton Memorial Gymnasium	500	Halifax Forum	5,796	F.B. Wickfire Memorial Field	2,000
Memorial	Non-football school		Memorial University Fieldhouse	1,400	Non-hockey school		King George V Park	6,400
Mount Allison	MacAulay Field	2,500	McCormack Gymnasium	800	Tantramar Regional Veteran's Civic Centre	750	MacAulay Field	2,500
Moncton	Non-football school		Gymnasium J.-Louis-Levesque (Women’s Volleyball only)	N/A	Aréna J.-Louis-Levesque	2,500	Croix-Bleue Medavie Stadium	8,300
UNB	Non-football school		Richard J. Currie Center	1,400	Aitken Centre	3,685	Chapman Field	1,500
UPEI	Non-football school		Chi-Wan Young Sports Centre	2,000	MacLauchlan Arena	1,300	UPEI Field Turf	3,000
Saint Mary's	Huskies Stadium	4,000*	The Tower	1,200	The Dauphinee Centre	1,200	Huskies Stadium	2,000
St. F.X.	Oland Stadium	4,000	Oland Centre Gymnasium	2,500	KMC	1,501	Oland Stadium	4,000
St. Thomas	Non-football school		Non-basketball school		Grant • Harvey Centre (Women’s only)	1,500	Non-soccer school	

(Data mined from the U Sports homepage's member directory and WorldStadiums.com.

== See also ==
- Atlantic University Sport Curling Championships
- AUS men's ice hockey tournament
