= Jeffery Thompson =

American author and writer (born 1986)

Jeffery T. Thompson, Jr.
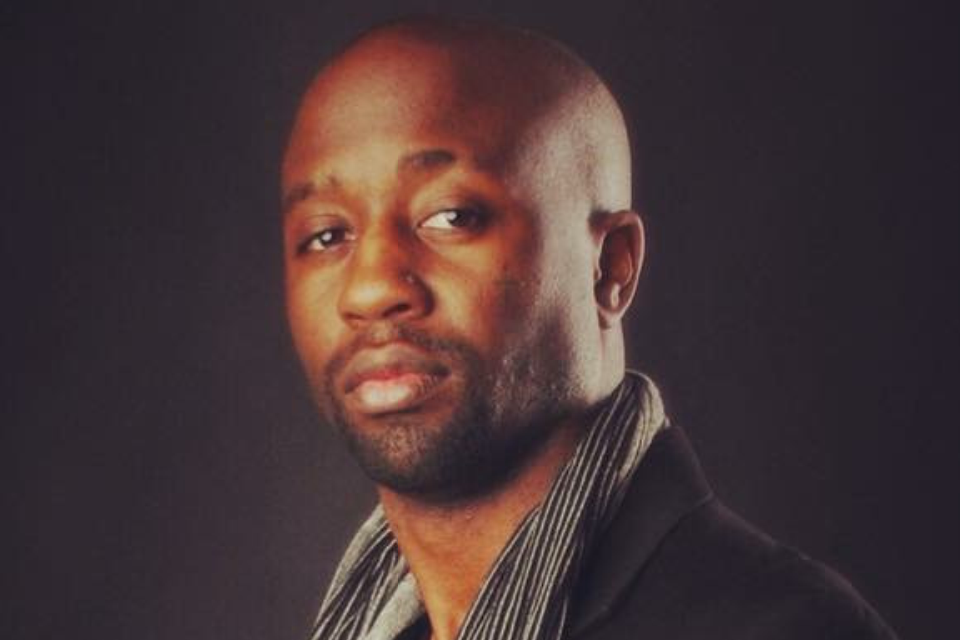
- Jeffery "Flash" Thompson, 2014
- Born: 1986 (age 39–40); Florissant, Missouri
- Occupations: Athlete, comic book author, filmmaker, entrepreneur

Jeffery Thomas "Flash" Thompson, Jr. (born 1986) is an American football player, comic book author, writer, and filmmaker from St. Louis. He played football for schools such as the West Virginia Mountaineers, where he participated in their win at the 2006 Sugar Bowl, the Oklahoma Panhandle State Aggies, and McGill Redmen, where he was named National Athlete of the Week for the 2010 CIS football season by the Football Reporters of Canada.

== Biography ==
Thompson was born in Florissant, Missouri, a suburb of St. Louis, the son to Ruth Thompson, a Licensed Health and Life Agent with a bachelor's degree in Business Administration, Major in Marketing, and Jeffery Thompson, a high school football and track coach, a professional football coach for an indoor football team and a Social Worker for the Homeless in the state of Missouri with a degree in Social Services. He graduated from Trinity Catholic High School in 2005, and then went on to West Virginia University to play college football for the Mountaineers, as cornerback and return man, participating in WVU's win against the Georgia Bulldogs in the 2006 Sugar Bowl. He also played for the Oklahoma Panhandle State University Aggies where he won some awards as an all-offensive back, and Simon Fraser Clan football in Burnaby, British Columbia, Canada. In 2010, he played for Montreal's McGill University Redmen, as kick returner, where he was the first player in the school's history to open a game with a touchdown, and was named as Canadian Interuniversity Sport Athlete of the Week.

He graduated from Simon Fraser University in 2011 with a Bachelor of General Studies, and then lived in Montreal for a time. When he was an extra on the set of the action film Wolverine while it was filming in British Columbia, he became intrigued by filmmaking. He had always been a fan of directors such as Christopher Nolan, Rob Zombie, and Martin Scorsese, and began writing several films of his own. He produced and acted in a few short films, then expanded into writing and recording some hip hop music and creating some music videos, releasing tracks such as "Dear Nas", "Rap Wars", and "Dying Gods". In 2014, he also branched into comic book writing, creating (with the assistance of artist Aaron Foster) his own comic book Diaries of the Invasion. It received several positive reviews, including an "A−" on IGN. His best known film was Boundary of Love, which was screened in multiple countries.

He has continued playing football after college, but switched to the international circuit, being recruited by American football teams in countries such as Egypt, Poland, Slovakia, and Brazil to play and coach. In 2014, he played American football professionally on a 6-month contract with the Brazilian Jundiai Ocelots, where he received the Super Nove 9th Brazil game MVP award, as Brazil American Football champion.

Also in 2014, Thompson began working on a horror film based on an old St. Louis legend, that of the murderous "Bubblehead Family". He created a concept trailer which was entirely shot and edited on an iPhone, and it became the #1 story on the Horror Society's website, viewed over 37,000 times.

In 2015, Thompson further expanded his repertoire by branching out into poetry, with his poem, "These Moments".

== Works ==
=== Comic book ===
- Thompson, Jeffery; Foster, Aaron (illustrator) (2014). Diaries of the Invasion. Lucha Comics. ISBN 9780992125929. (received A− rating on IGN)

=== Films ===
- Full-length film (in pre-production as of 2016), The Bubbleheads: Legend of Carrico Road
- Short film, "Boundary of Love", 2015
- Animated short film, "Chance: The Nightmare Dare", 2014
- Animated short film, "Diaries of the Invasion", 2014
- Short film, "The Bubbleheads", 2012

=== Hip hop music ===
- "The Introduction"
- "Dear Nas", 2012
- "Rap Wars", 2012
- "Dying Gods", 2012

== Awards ==
=== Football ===
- 2008, Oklahoma Panhandle State University All States 2nd team defensive back
- 2009, Canadian Interuniversity Sport, National Player of the Week, Special Teams
- 2010, McGill University Special Teams Player of the Year
- 2014, Super Nove 9th Brazil game MVP, Brazil American Football league champion

=== Media ===
- 2012, XXL Hip-Hop Breakin New Artist, Hiphop Dx artist feature
