= Concordia Stadium =

Stadium at Concordia University in Canada

Coordinates: 45.458°N 73.636°W

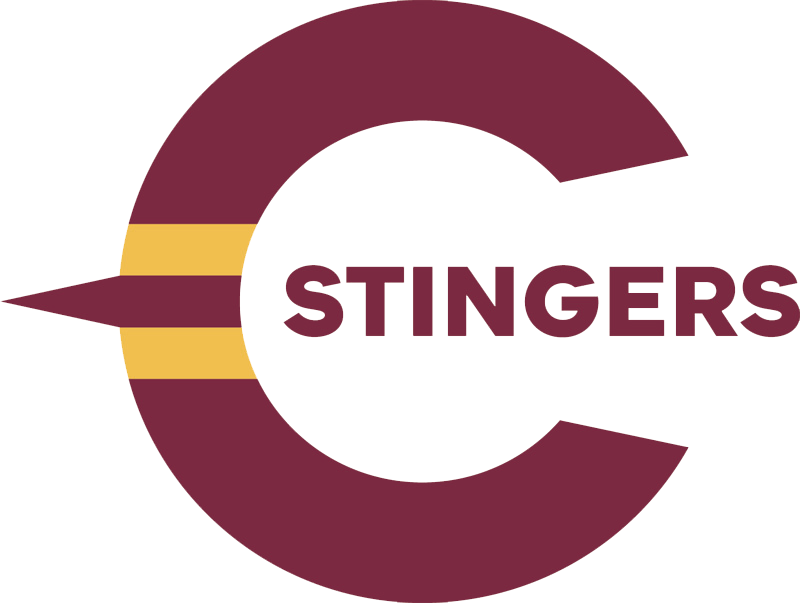
- Interactive map of Concordia Stadium
- Address: 7200 Sherbrooke St. W. Montreal; Canada
- Owner: Concordia University
- Operator: Concordia University Athletics
- Capacity: 4,000
- Type: Stadium
- Surface: FieldTurf
- Current use: Football; Soccer; Rugby union

Construction
- Opened: 2003; 23 years ago

Tenants
- Concordia Stingers (CIS) teams: football, soccer, rugby (2003–present)

Concordia Stadium is a stadium at Concordia University in Montreal, Quebec. It is home to the Concordia Stingers football, soccer, and rugby teams.

The stadium was opened in 2003, and has a seating capacity of 4,000.
