= StFX Stadium =

Sports stadium on the campus of St. Francis Xavier University

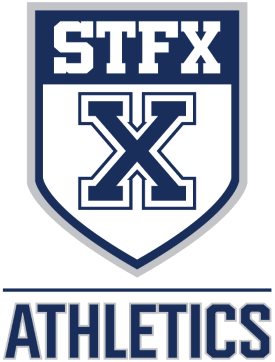

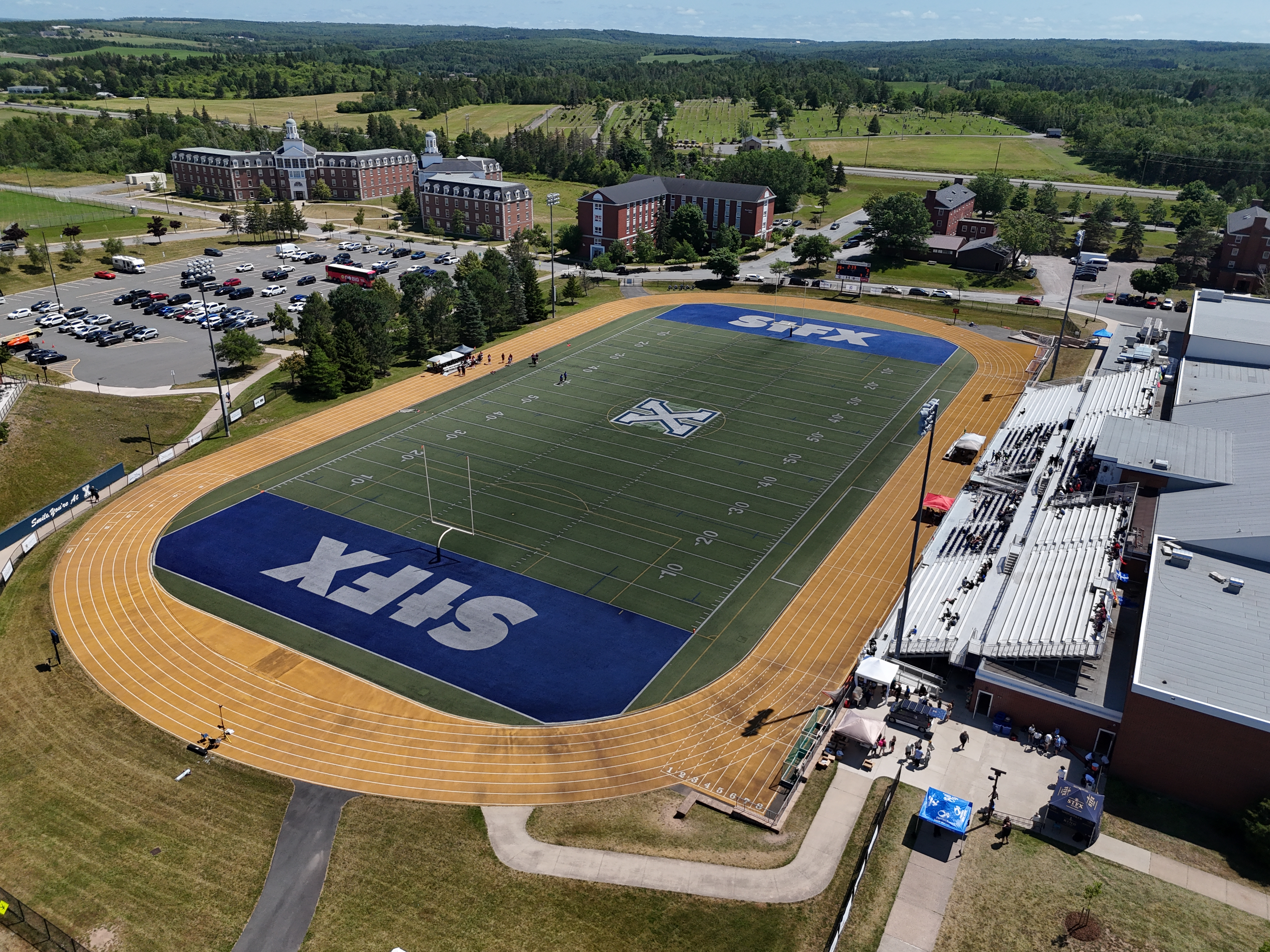
- View of the stadium in 2025

- Location in Nova Scotia Location in the Canada
- Former names: Oland Stadium
- Address: 3020 Martha Dr; Antigonish, NS; Canada
- Coordinates: 45.6166097°N 61.9949226°W
- Owner: St. Francis Xavier University
- Operator: St. Francis Xavier Athletics
- Capacity: 4,000
- Type: Stadium
- Surface: FieldTurf (2009–present)
- Current use: Football; Soccer; Rugby union Track and field

Construction
- Opened: 1967; 59 years ago
- Renovated: 2018

Tenants
- St. Francis Xavier X-Men (U Sports) teams: football, rugby, soccer, track and field

Website
- goxgo.ca/stadium

StFX Stadium, formerly known as Oland Stadium, is a stadium in Antigonish, Nova Scotia, on the campus of St. Francis Xavier University. It primarily serves as the home field of the St. Francis Xavier X-Men and X-Women varsity teams, including football, rugby, soccer, cross country, and track & field. It is also host to club teams, intramural participants, recreational users, and community groups.

The stadium features FieldTurf along with an eight-lane 400m rubberized track. The total seating capacity is over 4,000, including individual seating for 1,100, and features stadium lighting and perimeter fencing.

== History ==
In 1965, Sidney Culverwell Oland and his company, Oland and Son Limited, made a contribution to Oland's alma mater, St. Francis Xavier University. The contribution led to the university being able to construct a multi-purpose complex that was named the Oland Centre.

== Renovations ==
In March 2017, the Government of Nova Scotia announced that they would contribute $1,000,000 to the renovations of Oland Stadium. On July 31, 2017, the Government of Canada announced that $500,000 of federal funds were being invested into the stadium in order to improve economic growth. The wooden bleachers were replaced with a combination of aluminum bench seating and plastic bucket seats. In 2019, the varsity locker rooms were upgraded and replaced.

== Events ==
The 2018 Special Olympics Canada National Summer Games were held July 31, 2018, to August 4, 2018, where the athletics competitions were held at StFX Stadium.
