= University Stadium (Winnipeg) =

Track and field venue

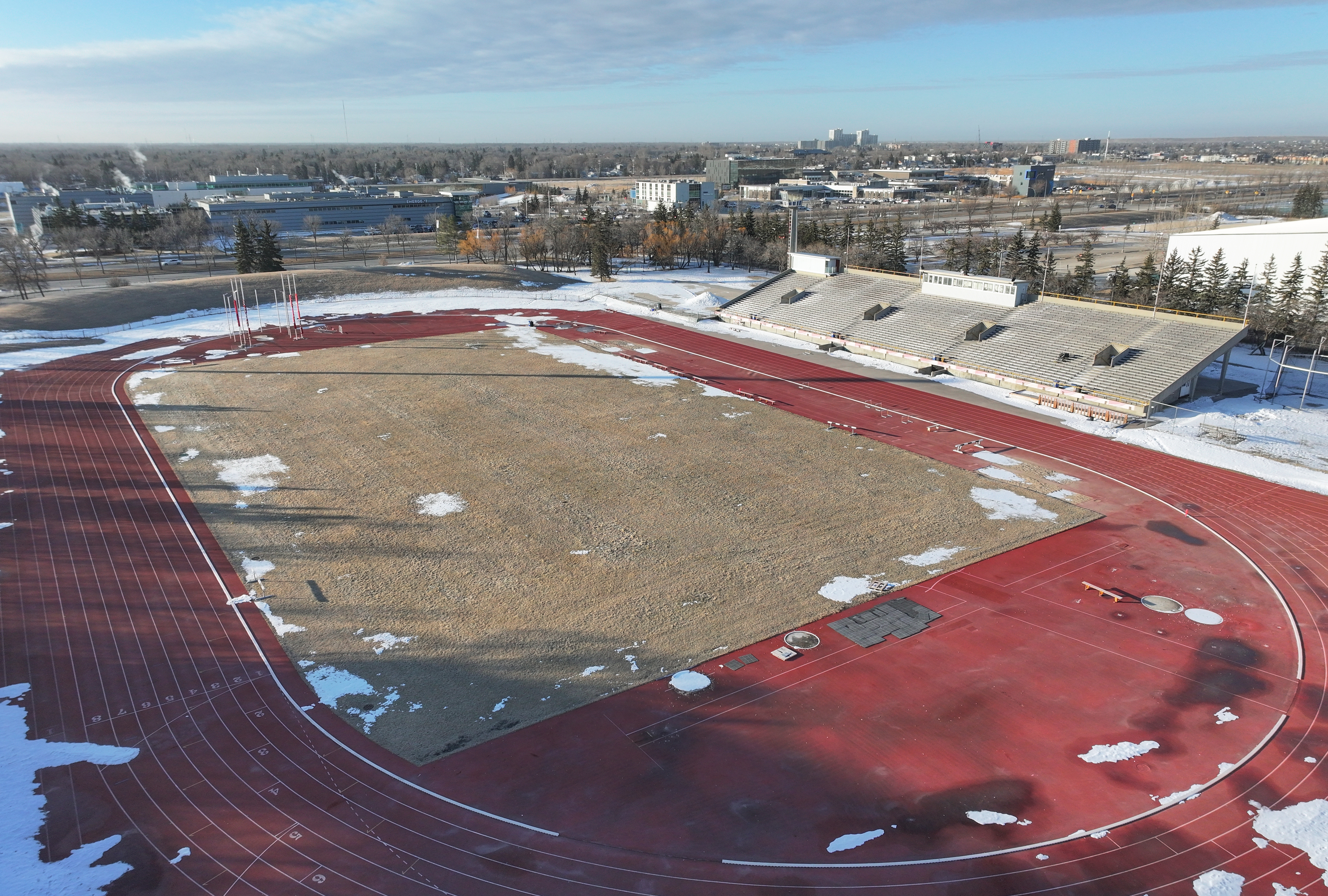
- Interactive map of University Stadium
- Former names: Pan American Stadium
- Location: University of Manitoba
- Coordinates: 49.806708°N 97.146161°W
- Owner: University of Manitoba
- Capacity: 5,000
- Surface: Natural grass 400m track

Construction
- Opened: 1967
- Cost: $1.1 million CAD

Tenant
- Manitoba Bisons (U Sports)

University Stadium is a multipurpose stadium located on the campus grounds of the University of Manitoba in Winnipeg, Manitoba, Canada. It features a 400m 8-lane track, as well as separate areas for long jump/triple jump, high jump, pole vault, discus, hammer, shot put, and javelin. Inside the track is a large natural grass field used for football and soccer. The stadium was home to the Manitoba Bisons football program until the team relocated next door to Investors Group Field in 2013.

== History ==
In September 1965 plans to construct a Pan American Track and Field Stadium, with a seating capacity of 20,000 and to be located at the University of Manitoba campus, adjacent to Bison Park was announced. Construction began in October 1965 and was completed by September 1966 in time for the 1967 Pan Am Games.

The stadium was originally constructed as the track and field venue for the 1967 Pan American Games. After the games, the stadium was turned over to the University of Manitoba and became home to the university's football team and track and field teams. It was upgraded in 1973 and later again prior to the 1999 Pan American Games, when a new track and other facilities were installed. The stadium has a permanent seating capacity of 5,000, which has been augmented with temporary seating during major events. The facility is wheelchair accessible, has an adjacent parking lot, and is served by public transit.

As part of the IG Field construction project, University Stadium was refurbished in the early 2010s for a cost of C$5 million.

The Stadium was upgraded in 2015 at a cost of $C2 million when Winnipeg hosted the 2017 Canada Summer Games. The track was resurfaced again, the last being since 1999.
