= Griffiths Stadium =

Stadium in Saskatchewan, Canada

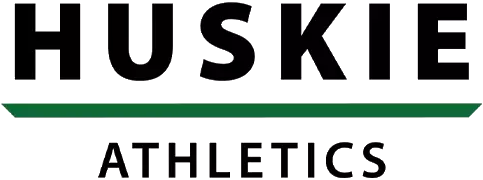

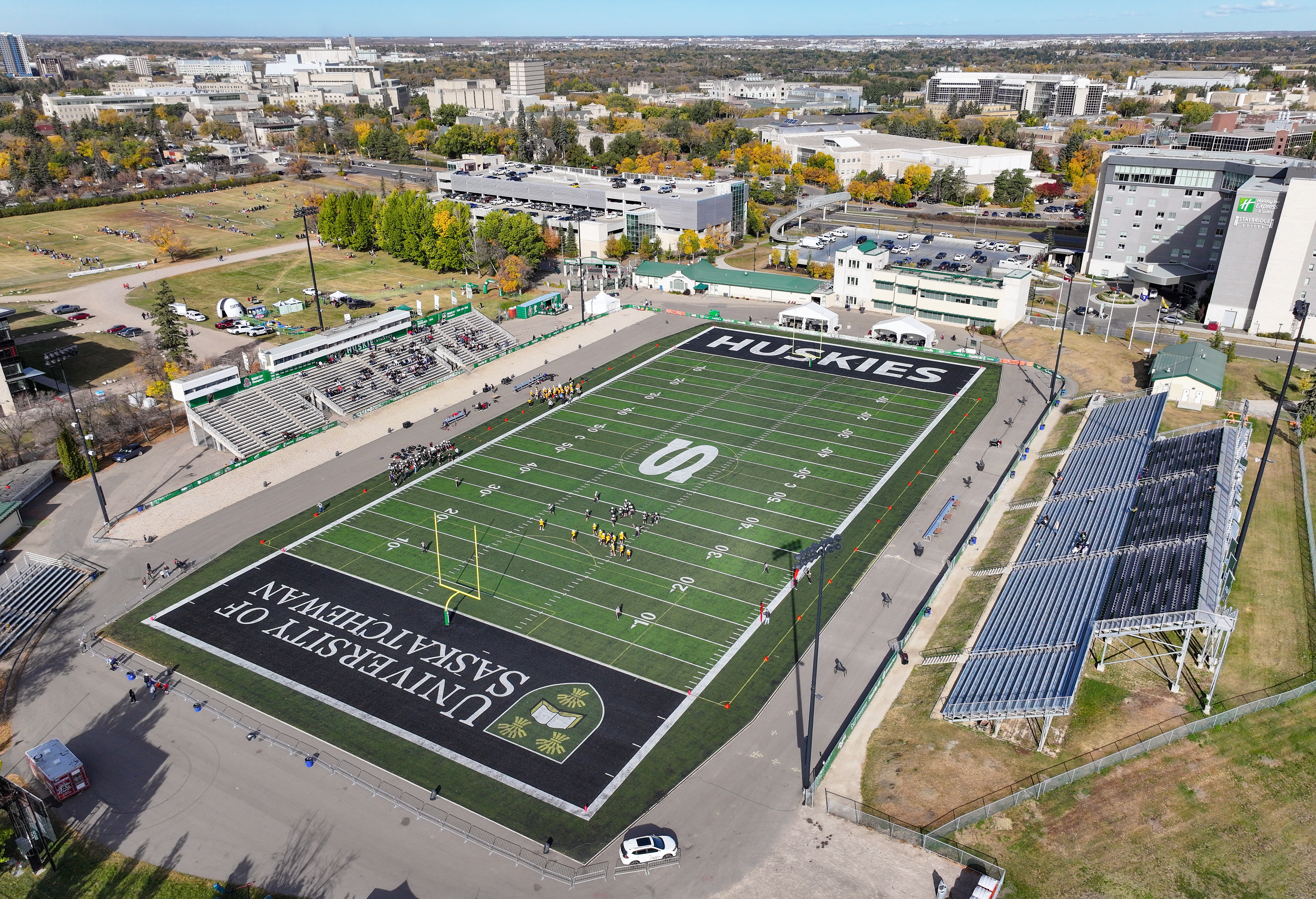
- The stadium during a game in 2025
- Interactive map of Griffiths Stadium
- Address: 100 Brian Towriss Crescent Saskatoon; Canada
- Coordinates: 52.126986°N 106.629772°W
- Owner: University of Saskatchewan
- Operator: USaskatchewan Athletics
- Capacity: 5,743 expandable temporary seating 12,567
- Type: Stadium
- Surface: FieldTurf; 400m track
- Record attendance: ( Football; Vanier Cup November 25,2006, Laval Rouge et Or vs Saskatchewan Huskies]] 12,567 Saskatchewan Huskies vs. Regina Rams, September 8, 2023) 10,054
- Field size: 110 yards (100 m) x 65 yards (59 m)
- Current use: Football; Soccer; Track and field

Construction
- Opened: June 23, 1967; 59 years ago
- Renovated: 2006

Tenants
- Saskatchewan Huskies (U Sports) teams: football, soccer: (Women's) (Men's), track and field; Saskatoon Valkyries (WWCFL)

Website
- huskies.usask.ca/griffiths-stadium

Griffiths Stadium is a stadium located on the grounds of the University of Saskatchewan in Saskatoon, Saskatchewan. The current stadium was opened on June 23, 1967, to host the Saskatchewan Huskies football team. There was previously a Griffiths Stadium 200 metres to the east of the current location, which operated from 1936 until the new site was opened.

The Saskatchewan Huskies football team of the U Sports Canada West Universities Athletic Association are the primary tenant of the facility. It also frequently hosts the Saskatoon Valkyries of the Western Women's Canadian Football League, most recently the 2023 WWCFL Championship Final. It has previously been used by the Saskatoon Hilltops of the Canadian Junior Football League, along with various soccer teams. Griffiths Stadium hosted the 2004 and 2005 Mitchell Bowl games, the 1998 and 1989 Churchill Bowls, as well as numerous Hardy Trophy games.

== Overview ==
In 2005, the University of Saskatchewan received a $5 million donation from PotashCorp to improve the facilities to meet the requirements of hosting the 2006 Vanier Cup. In recognition of this donation, the University of Saskatchewan renamed the fields surrounding the stadium Potash Corp Park. Improvements included Next Generation FieldTurf, expanded seating capacity (to 4,997), improved washroom facilities, and improved dressing room facilities. The 2006 Vanier Cup was a sellout of 12,567 fans, with temporary seating added for the event.

On June 23, 2010, it was announced that the Graham Huskies Clubhouse, which was originally built in 2006 with a dressing room, meeting room and offices for the coaching staff, will be expanded with a new two-storey building to the east of the current clubhouse. Thanks to a $3 million donation from Ron and Jane Graham, who donated $1.2 million to construct the original clubhouse, and $160,000 from David Dubé and Heather Ryan, who have funded many things Huskie Football (including the gameday fireworks, championship flags, inflatable mascots, and team jerseys), the Huskies will have a new building that will include a gym, multiple meeting rooms, coaches offices, and a rooftop viewing deck.

The first-floor training centre will be outfitted with six lifting stations, including an Olympic lifting platform, a lifting power cage, and dumbbell stations as well as a number of cardio areas. There will also be a narrow Field-Turf track, about 25 meters long, which will allow for some winter speed training and agility work. When players are working out, they will be using brand new equipment and have an incredible view of Griffiths Stadium through large windows.

The second floor will be used for meetings. There is one small permanent meeting room and one large permanent meeting room. The large room will sit approximately 100 people. This room can be divided into three smaller meeting rooms, allowing the Huskies to meet as a team or in individual groups. Players and coaches will be able to watch game film together or on their own.

There will be a mechanical and film centre on the third floor and there are plans for a rooftop patio which can be used during Griffith Stadium events.

With this addition comes a new work flow for the Huskies and their coaches. A new video scouting system has been purchased and the team will have 11 stations to view video (up from five this year). There will be new HD TVs, projectors, cameras and the same film software capabilities that NFL teams use. The clubhouse will get some new furniture and an upgraded sound system, among other details.

Griffiths Stadium was expanded in August and September 2011, adding 1,174 seats. Funding for the new seats will be provided by University of Saskatchewan alumni David Dube and his wife Heather Ryan. Ten rows of seats were added to the east side stands between the 30 yard lines. These seats are premium seats which are wider, have more leg room, featuring armrests and cup holders. These seats are modelled after stadium seats in NFL stadiums.

In May 2026, the stadium hosted a preseason game by the Saskatchewan Roughriders of the Canadian Football League.

== Gallery ==
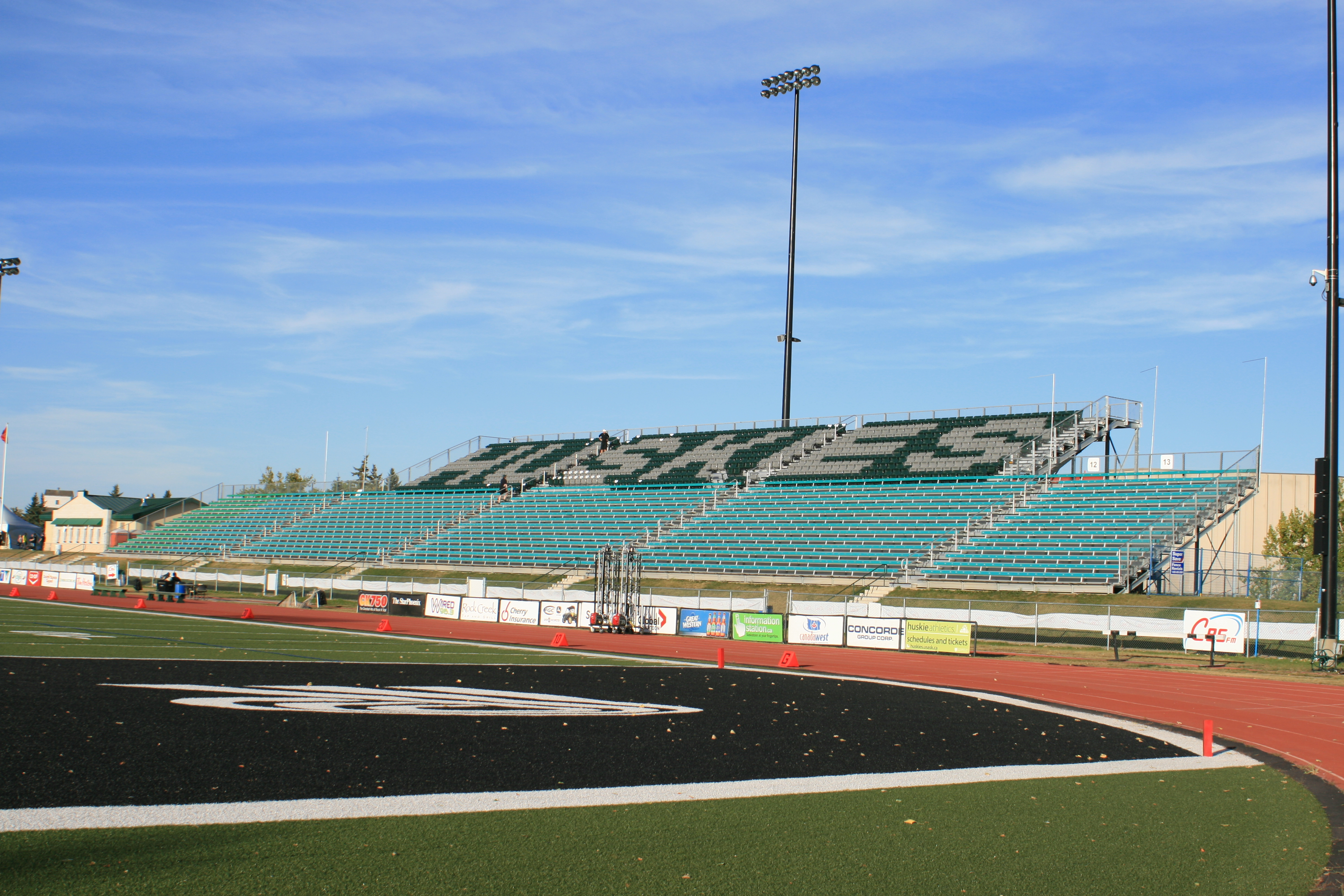
East side stands

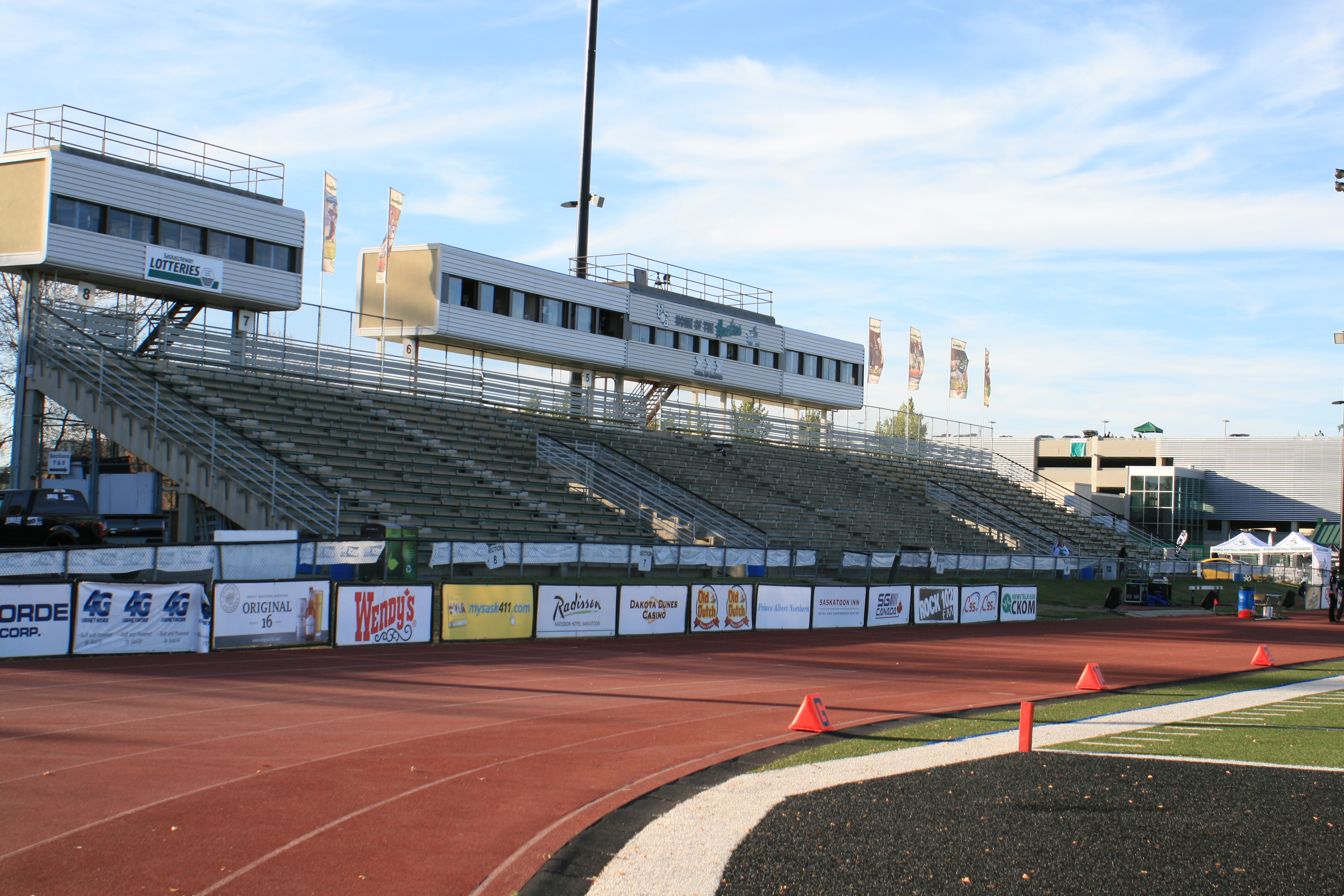
West side stands

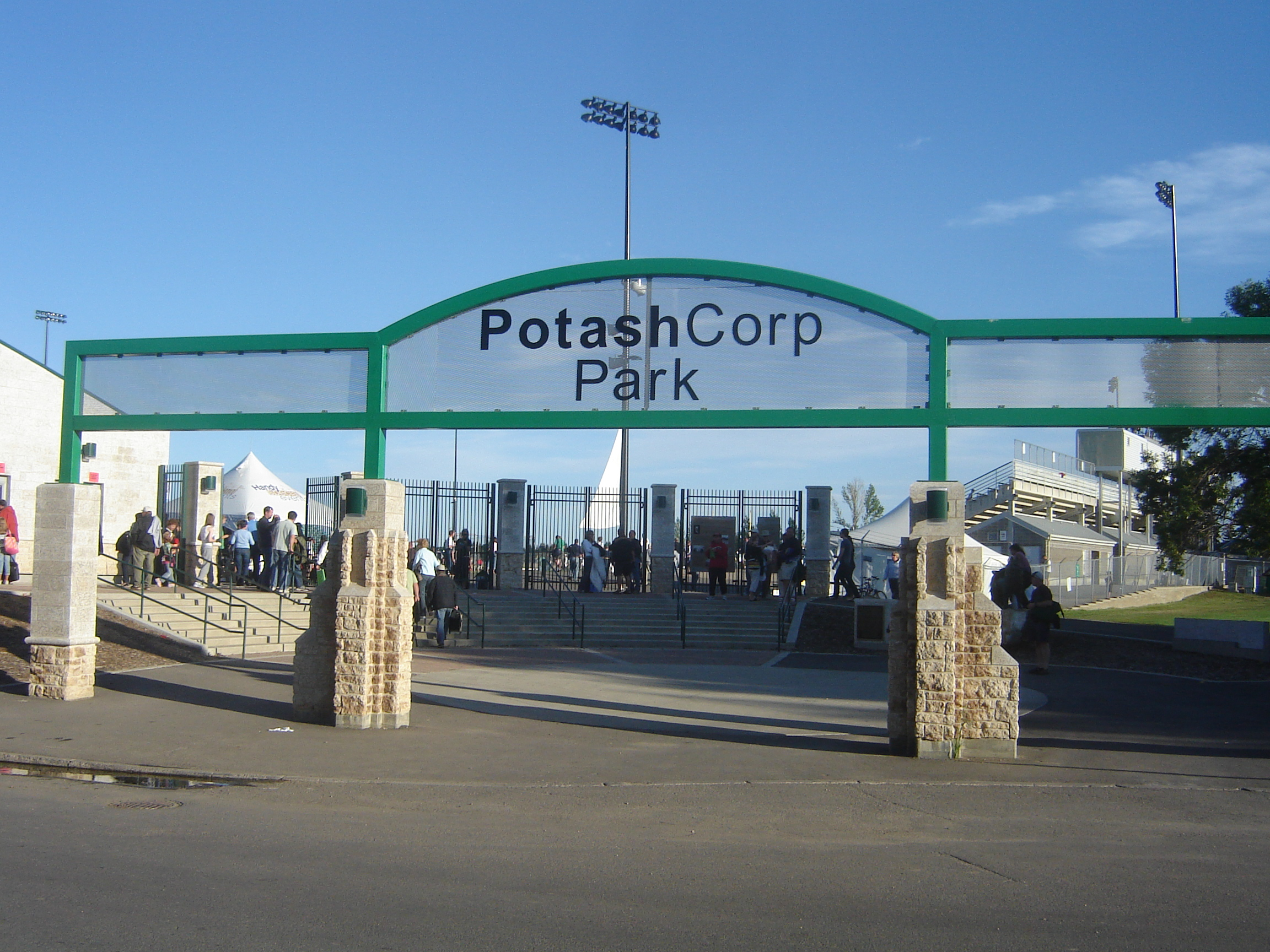
Entrance

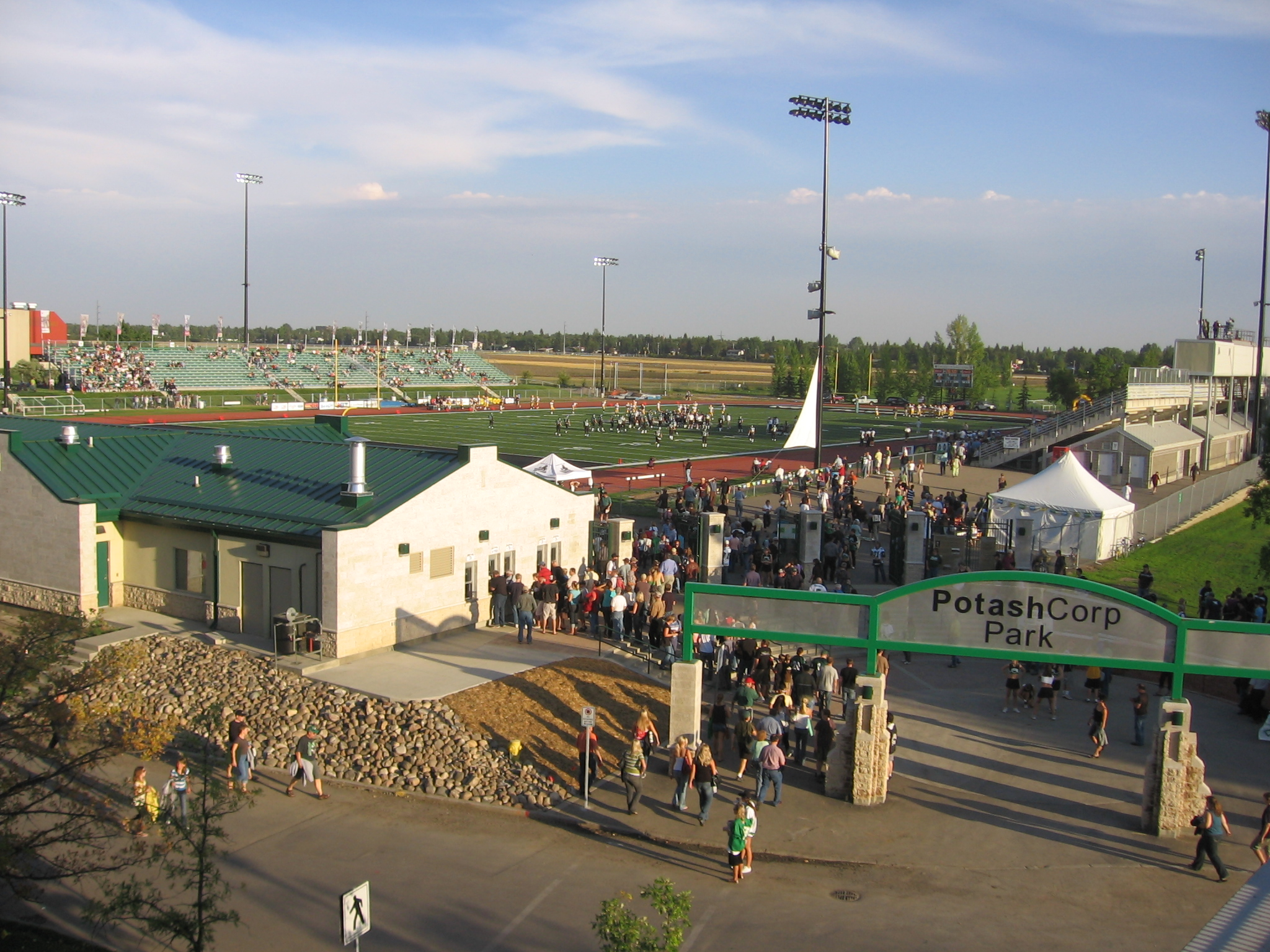
Exterior view

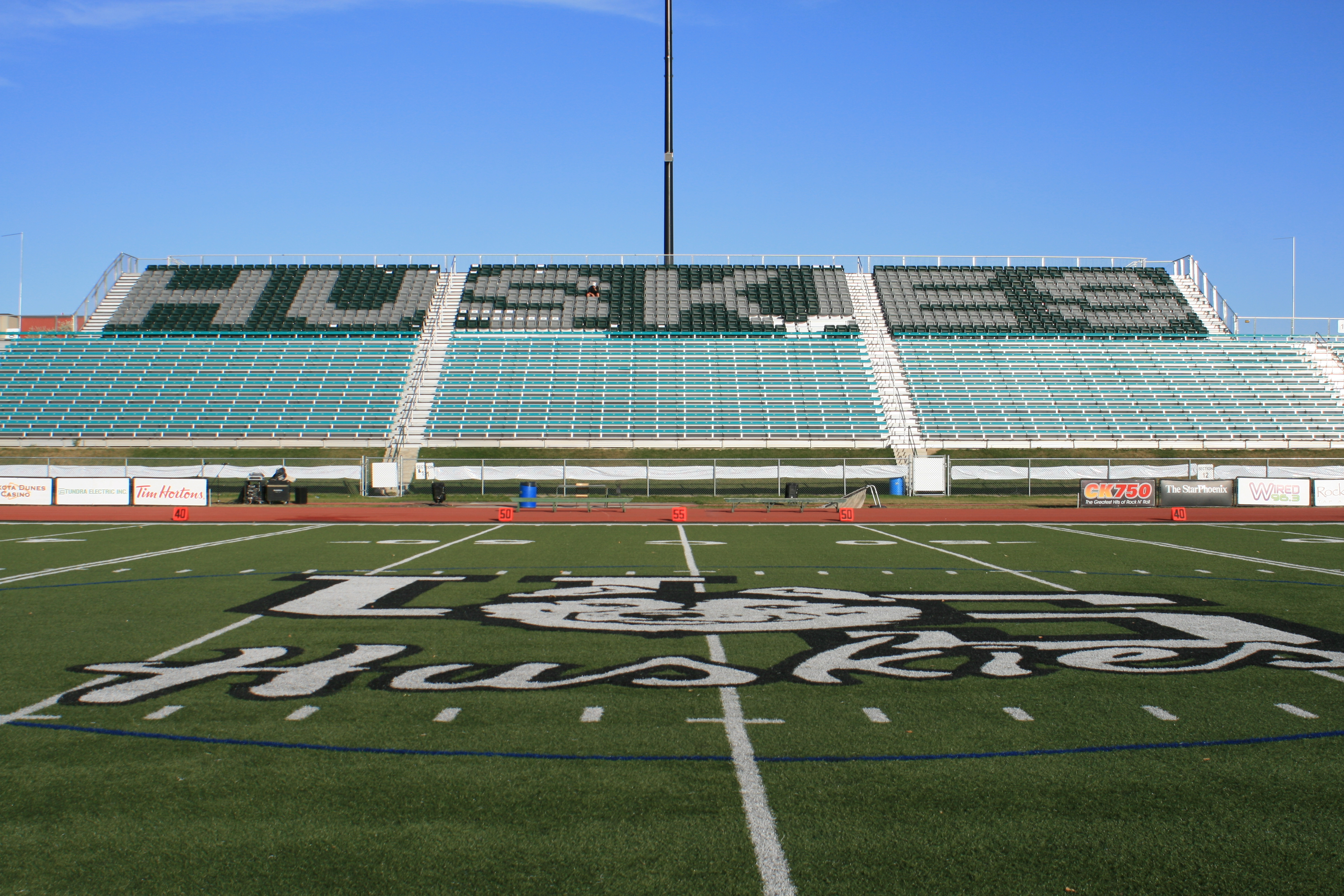
East side stands

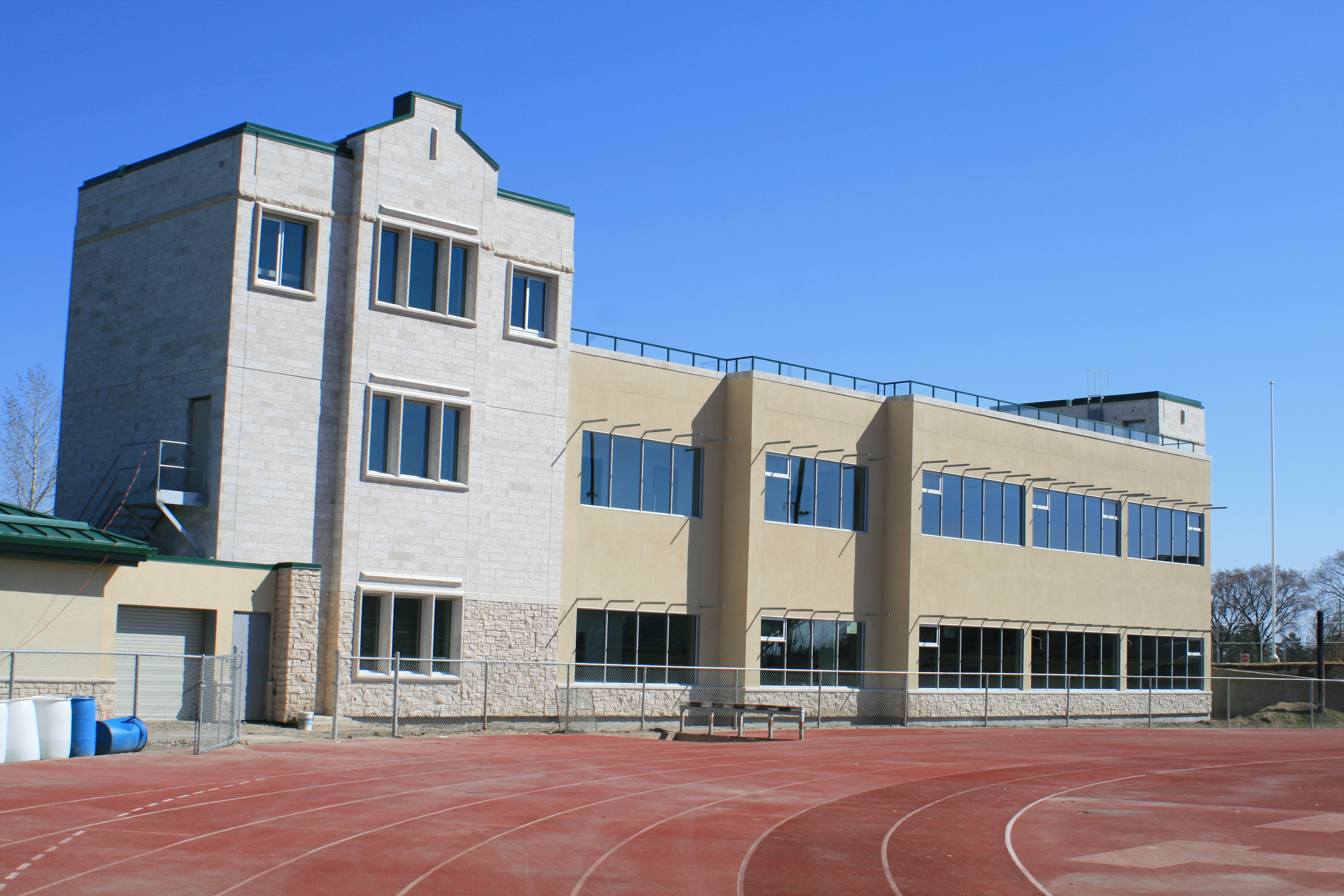
Clubhouse

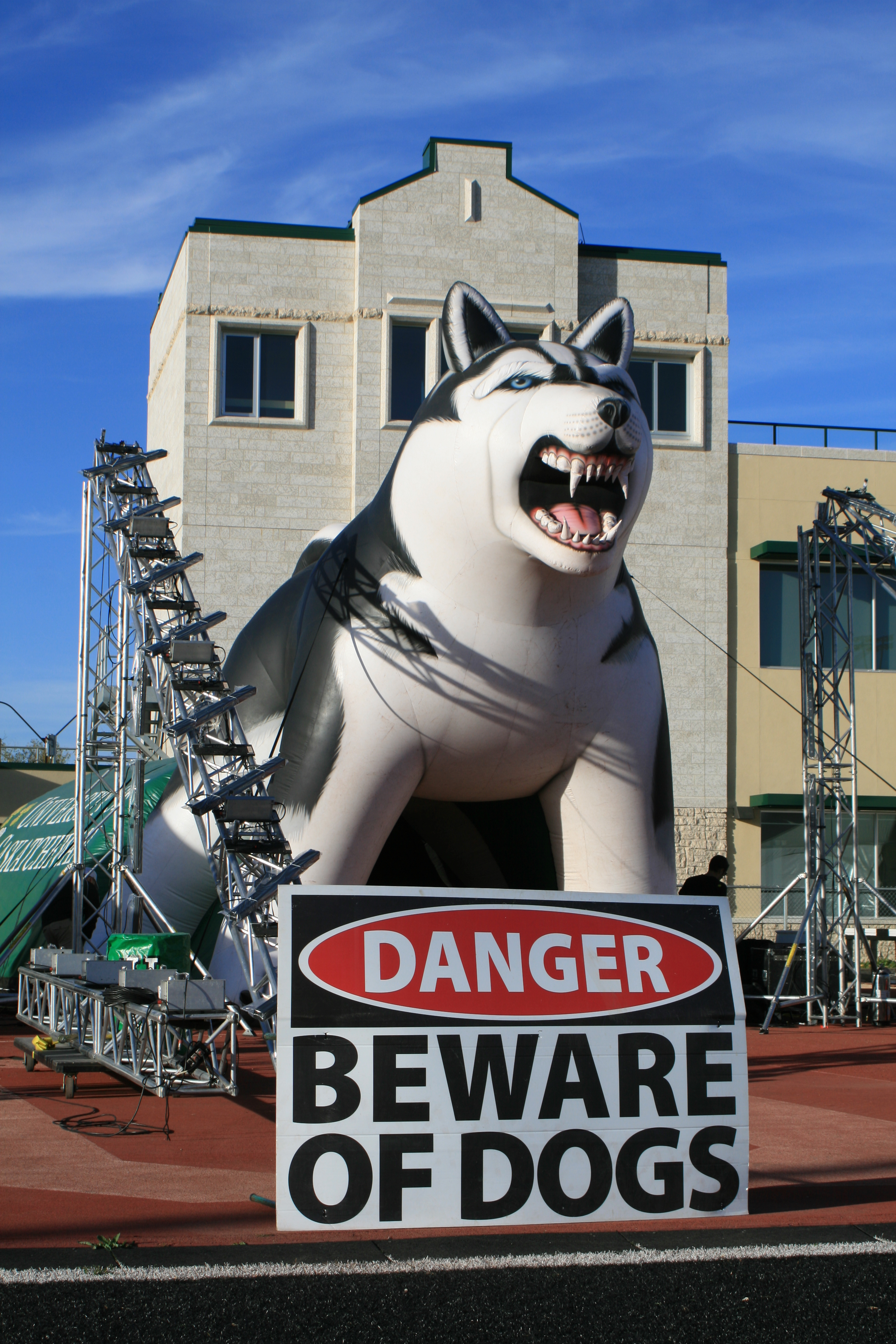
Huskie mascot

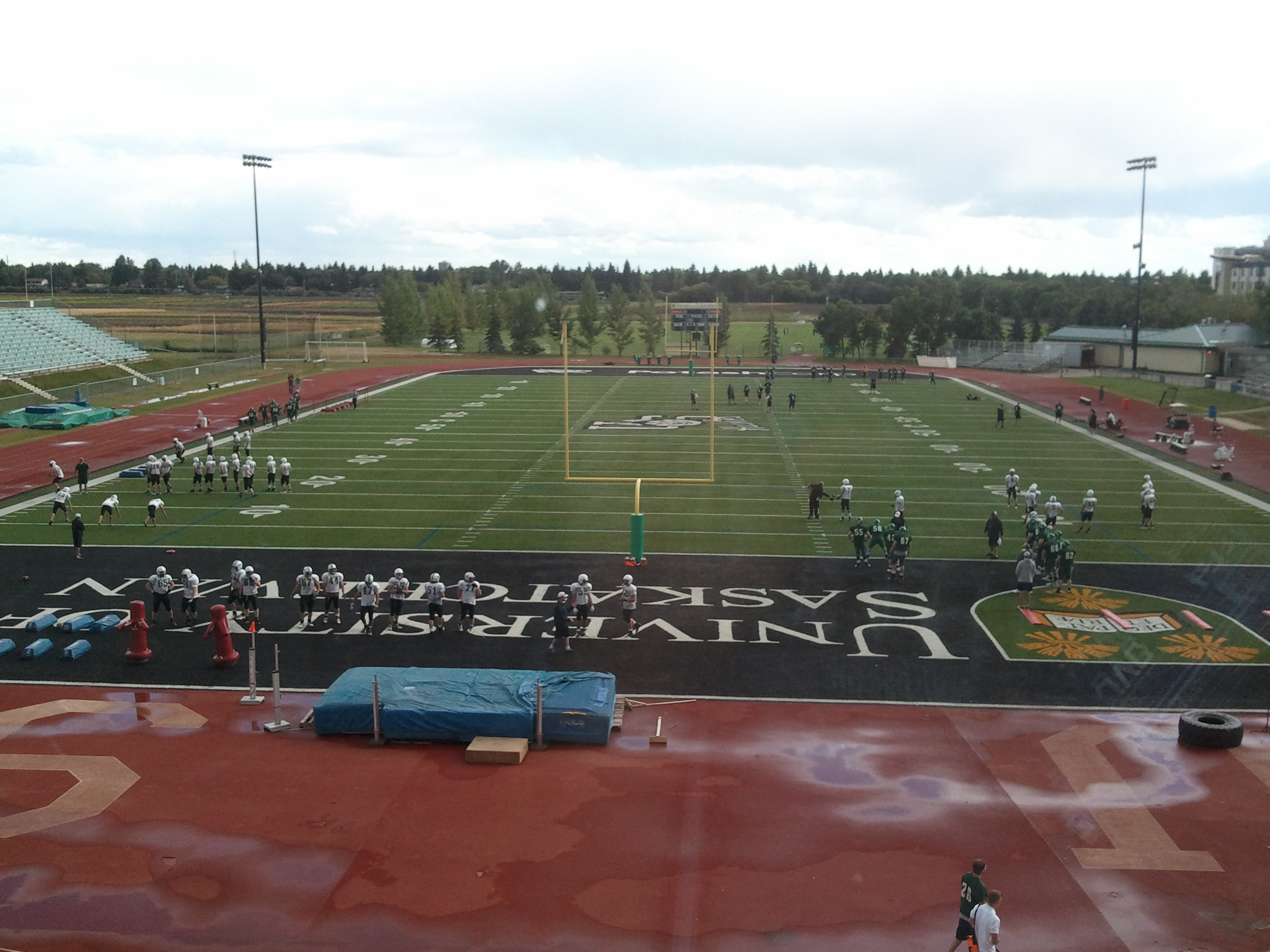
Playing field at Griffiths Stadium from the Graham Huskies Clubhouse

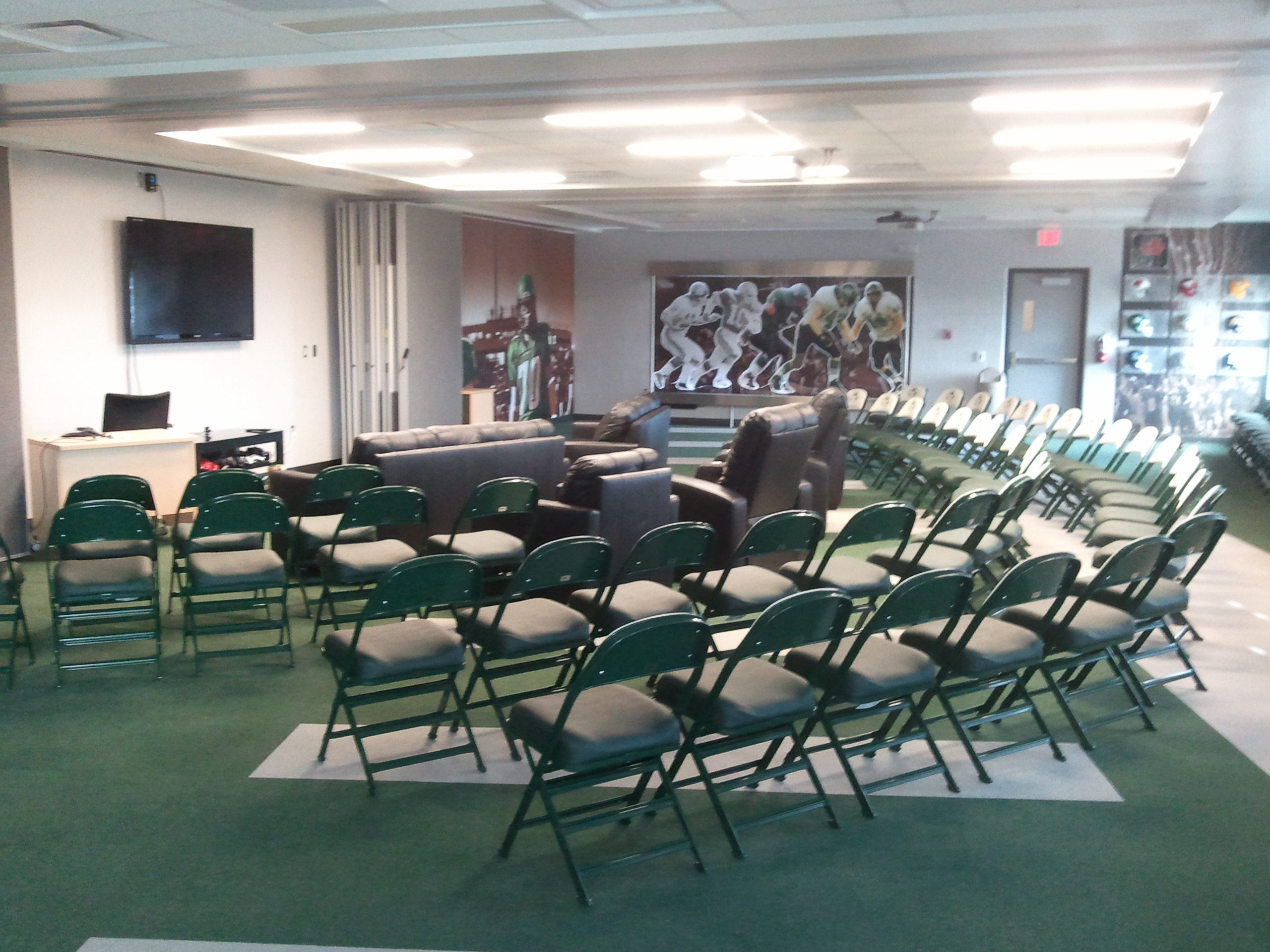
Meeting rooms

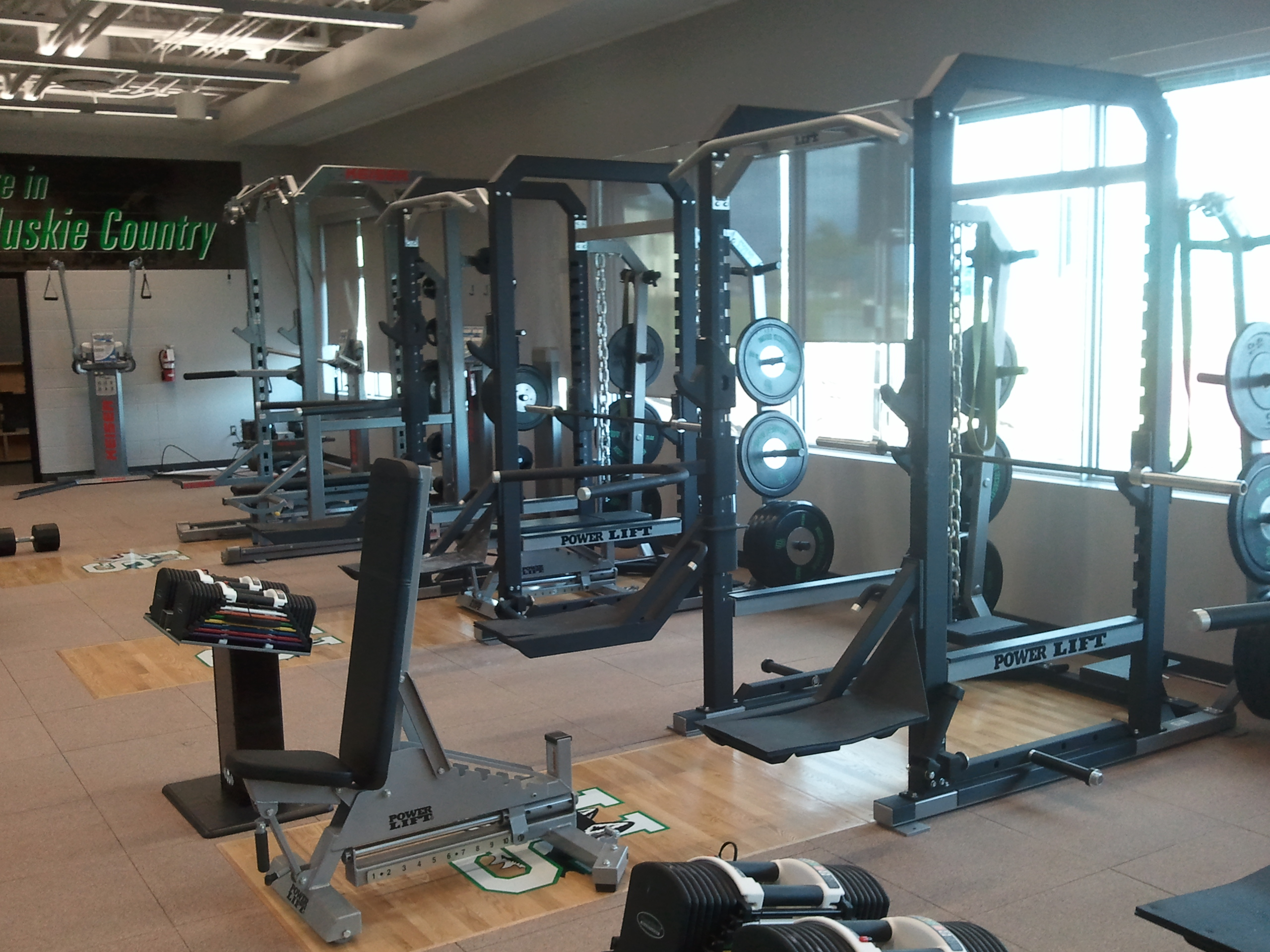
Lifting stations
