= Jade Etienne =

Canadian football player (born 1989)

No. 88
- Position: Wide receiver

Personal information
- Born: November 10, 1989 (age 36); Calgary, Alberta, Canada
- Listed height: 6 ft 3 in (1.91 m)
- Listed weight: 190 lb (86 kg)

Career information
- University: Saskatchewan
- CFL draft: 2011: 1st round, 4th overall pick

Career history
- 2011–2013: Winnipeg Blue Bombers
- 2014: Saskatchewan Roughriders

Awards and highlights
- First CFL touchdown scored July 26, 2013 versus the Calgary Stampeders
- Stats at CFL.ca (archive)

Jade Etienne (born November 10, 1989) is a Canadian former professional football wide receiver. In the Canadian Football League’s Amateur Scouting Bureau December rankings, he was ranked as the 15th best player for players eligible in the 2011 CFL draft. Etienne was drafted fourth overall in the draft by the Winnipeg Blue Bombers and signed a contract with the team on June 1, 2011. He played CIS football with the Saskatchewan Huskies and played high school football at Luther College in Regina. He was traded to the Roughriders for quarterback Drew Willy on February 6, 2014. Etienne was released prior to the start of the 2014 CFL regular season.

== Professional career ==
CFL Career Statistics
Season	Team	GP	Receptions	Yards	Average	TD
2011	Winnipeg Blue Bombers	17	0	0	0.0	0
2012	Winnipeg Blue Bombers	14	1	11	11.0	0
2013	Winnipeg Blue Bombers	14	19	265	13.9	2
Total		45	20	276	13.8	2

All statistics taken from Stats Crew
