= Foote Field =

Sports facility in Edmonton, Alberta

Coordinates: 53.5038°N 113.5313°W

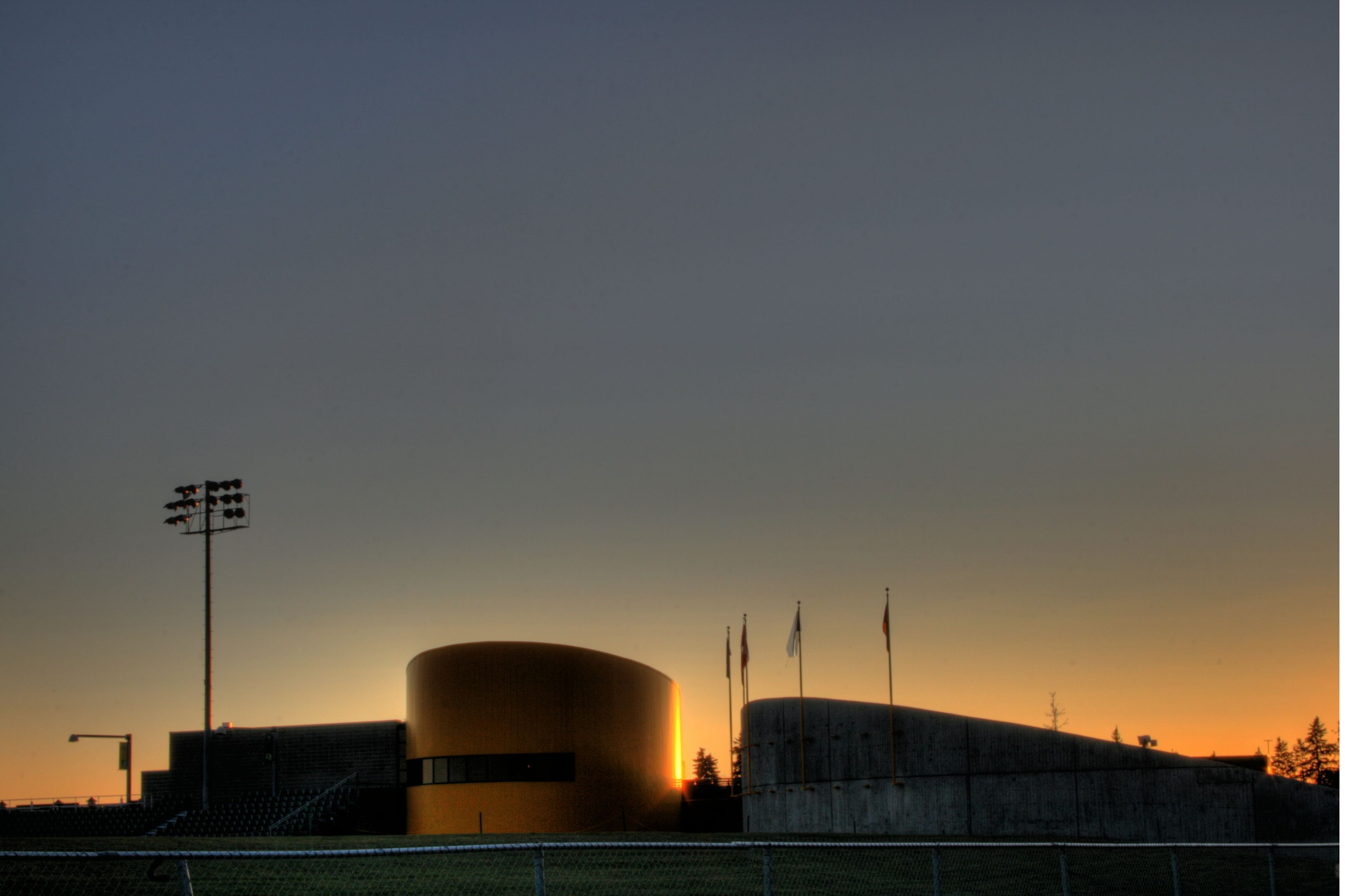
- Sun setting behind Foote Field.
- Interactive map of Foote Field
- Location: 11601 68 Avenue, University of Alberta South Campus, Edmonton, Alberta
- Owner: University of Alberta
- Capacity: East Field: 3,500; West Field: 1,500
- Surface: East Field: PureGrass; West Field: Natural grass
- Public transit: South Campus/Fort Edmonton Park station

Construction
- Opened: September 8, 2001
- Cost: C$10.5 million ($17.6 million in 2025 dollars)

Tenants
- Alberta Golden Bears/Alberta Pandas (U Sports) (2001–present); FC Edmonton (NASL) (2011)

Foote Field is a multi-purpose sports facility on the University of Alberta South Campus in Edmonton, Alberta, Canada, built as a legacy facility for the 2001 World Championships in Athletics. It was named for University of Alberta alumnus, former varsity track athlete, and philanthropist Eldon Foote, who donated $2 million toward the construction costs.

== Design ==
Foote Field features two separate athletic fields on either side of a multi-purpose indoor facility. The East Field is a fully lit stadium that serves as home for the Alberta Golden Bears football. It features a CFL-sized surface, press box, electronic scoreboard, and has a capacity of 3,500 spectators. The East Field also features a four-lane, 125 m warm-up runway. In 2007, the field's older Astroturf surface was replaced with a newer type of hybrid artificial surface made by Astroturf LLC, called PureGrass.

The West Field is designed for track-and-field training and competition. It features a 400 m Beynon Sports running track, as well as separate areas for long jump/triple jump, high jump, pole vault, discus, hammer, shot put, and javelin. Inside the track is a natural-turf soccer field. Like the East Field, the West Field features a press box, electronic scoreboard, and has a capacity of 1,500 spectators.

Between the two fields is a multi-purpose indoor facility, which includes locker rooms, press box, and concession area. Other indoor facilities include classroom space, meeting rooms, and a high-performance weight-training area. The fitness centre is for the use of high-performance student-athletes only.
