= Bryce McCall =

Canadian football player (born 1988)

Profile
- Position: Defensive back

Personal information
- Born: August 4, 1988 (age 38); Regina, Saskatchewan, Canada
- Listed height: 6 ft 0 in (1.83 m)
- Listed weight: 200 lb (91 kg)

Career information
- CJFL: Regina Thunder
- University: Saskatchewan
- CFL draft: 2012: undrafted

Career history
- 2013: Saskatchewan Roughriders
- Stats at CFL.ca (archive)

Medal record

Men's American football

Representing Canada

World Championship
Silver medal – second place	2011 Austria	Team competition

Bryce McCall (born August 4, 1988) is a Canadian former football defensive back for the Saskatchewan Roughriders of the Canadian Football League (CFL). After the 2011 CIS season, he was ranked as the eighth best player in the Canadian Football League's Amateur Scouting Bureau January rankings for players eligible in the 2012 CFL draft, and fifth by players in Canadian Interuniversity Sport. He played CIS football with the Saskatchewan Huskies and in the CJFL with the Regina Thunder. He signed with the Roughriders as a free agent on December 19, 2012.
