= Patrick Neufeld =

Canadian gridiron football player (born 1988)

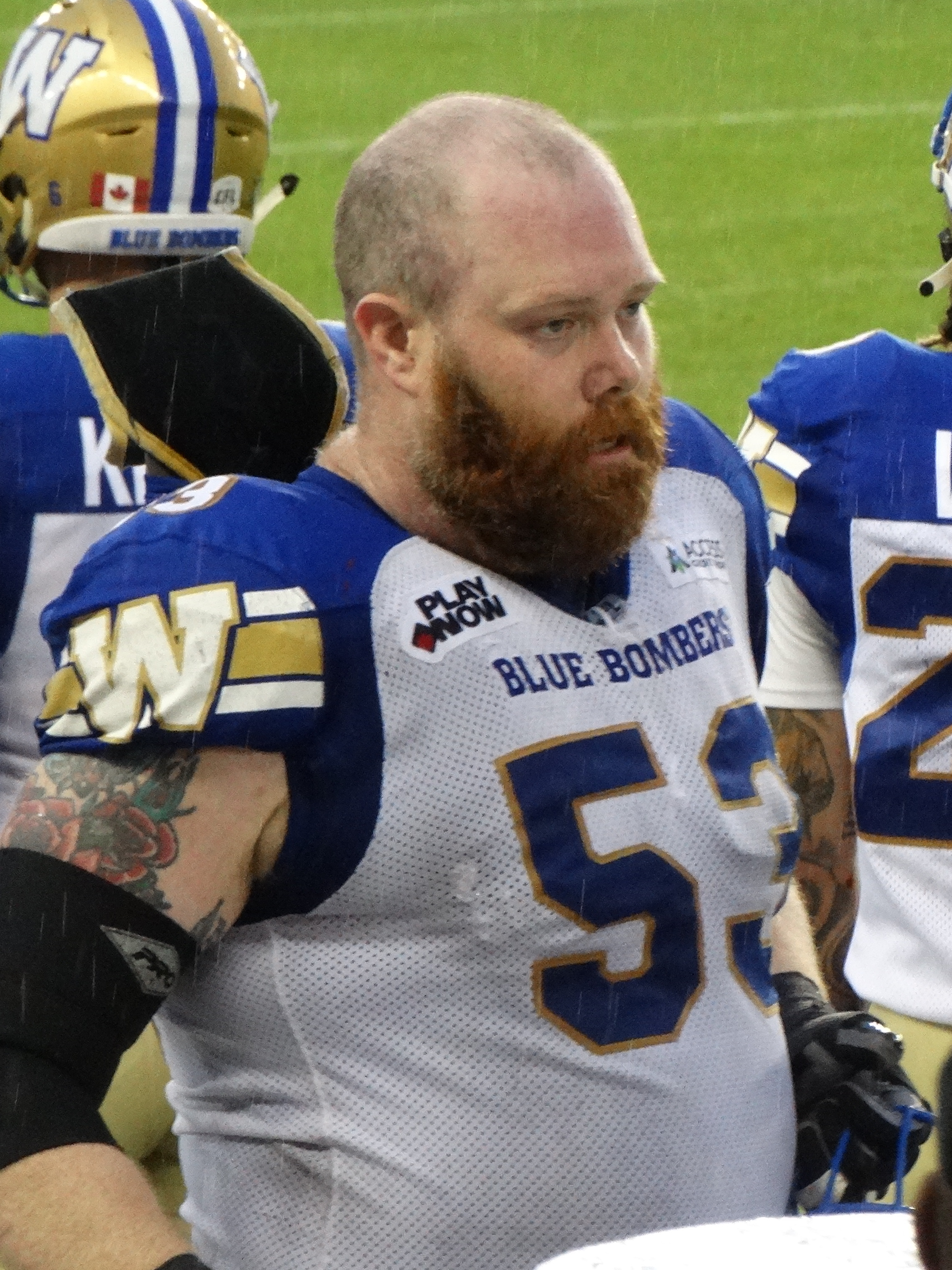
- Neufeld with the Winnipeg Blue Bombers in 2025

No. 53 – Winnipeg Blue Bombers
- Position: Offensive lineman
- Roster status: Active
- CFL status: National

Personal information
- Born: December 26, 1988 (age 37); Regina, Saskatchewan, Canada
- Listed height: 6 ft 5 in (1.96 m)
- Listed weight: 291 lb (132 kg)

Career information
- High school: Luther College High School
- University: Saskatchewan
- CFL draft: 2010: 5th round, 33rd overall pick

Career history
- 2010: Saskatchewan Roughriders*
- 2011–2013: Saskatchewan Roughriders
- 2013–present: Winnipeg Blue Bombers
- * Offseason or practice squad member only

Awards and highlights
- 2× Grey Cup champion (2019, 2021); 3× CFL All-Star (2021, 2022, 2023); 3× CFL West All-Star (2021, 2022, 2023); First-team All-Canadian (2011)
- Stats at CFL.ca

Patrick Neufeld (born December 26, 1988) is a Canadian professional football offensive lineman for the Winnipeg Blue Bombers of the Canadian Football League (CFL). He is a two-time Grey Cup champion having won the 107th Grey Cup and 108th Grey Cups as a member of the Blue Bombers. He is also a three-time CFL All-Star.

== Early life ==
Neufeld played high school football at Luther College in Regina, Saskatchewan.

== University career ==
Neufeld played U Sports football for the Saskatchewan Huskies football team from 2008 to 2011. In his final season, in 2011, he was named a CIS First Team All-Canadian as the Huskies had the best offensive record in the country that year.

== Professional career ==
=== Saskatchewan Roughriders ===
Neufeld was drafted 33rd overall by the Saskatchewan Roughriders in the 2010 CFL draft but returned to school following the 2010 training camp. He appeared in 17 regular season games in both 2011 and 2012 for the Roughriders, but only dressed for three games in 2013 in an injury-plagued season.

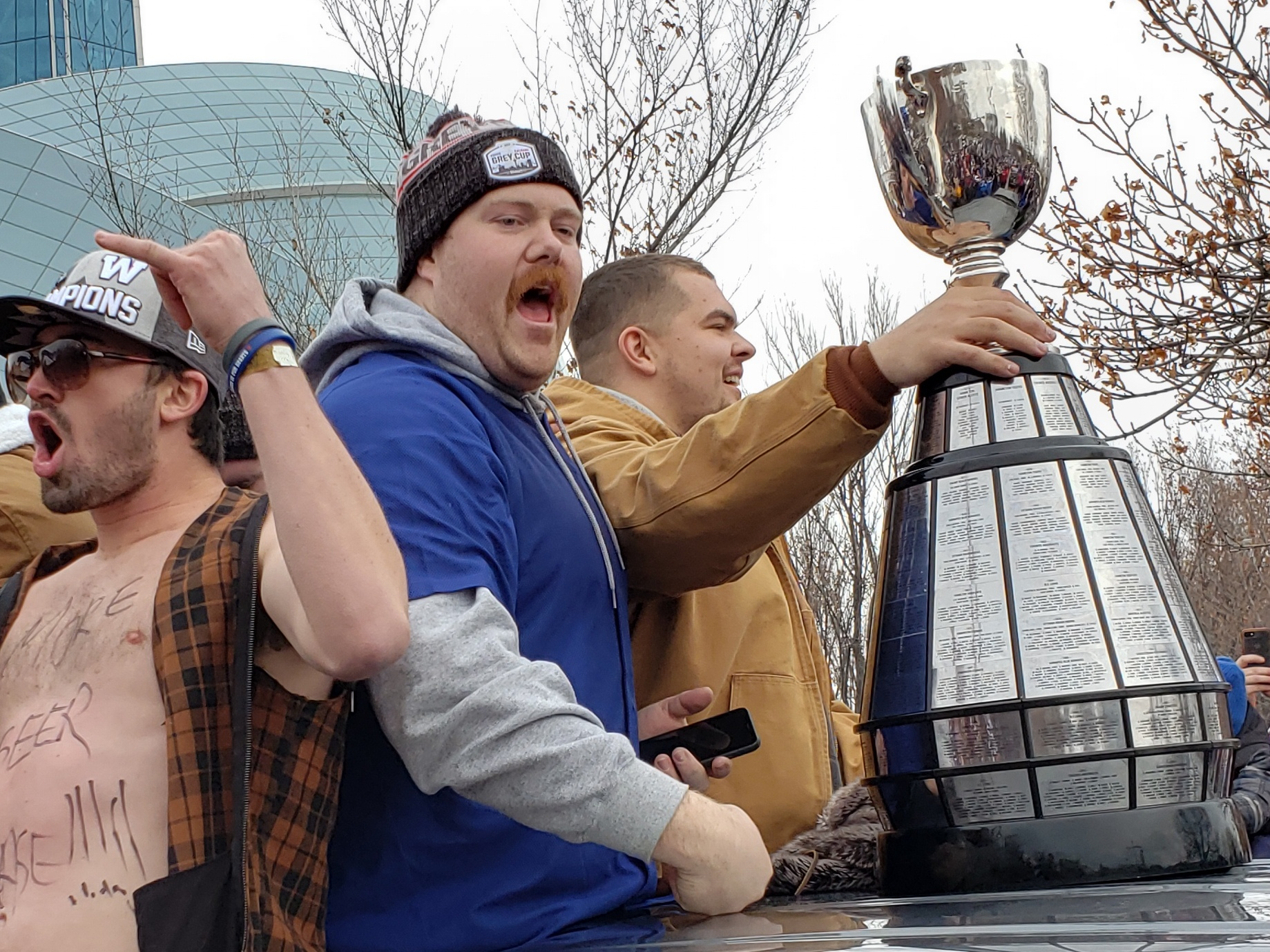
Neufeld (in blue) during the 2019 Grey Cup parade.

=== Winnipeg Blue Bombers ===
On October 6, 2013, Neufeld was traded (along with a 5th round selection in the 2015 CFL draft) to the Winnipeg Blue Bombers for Alex Hall and a 2nd round pick in the 2014 CFL draft. He remained on the injured list for the duration of the 2013 season. From 2014 to 2016, he battled injuries as he only dressed for a maximum of 12 games in each of those seasons. In 2017 and 2018, he dressed in all 18 regular season games and a combined three post-season games.

For the 2019 season, he was injured before training camp and did not play in the first 12 games of the season. He started the last six regular season games and three post-season games. Neufeld won the 107th Grey Cup when the Bombers defeated the Hamilton Tiger-Cats 33-12, a game in which he started as the right guard. After the win, he signed a one-year extension with Winnipeg to play his seventh year with the team. He did not play in 2020 due to the cancellation of the 2020 CFL season but signed another one-year extension with the Blue Bombers on January 19, 2021.

In 2021, Neufeld played in 13 of 14 regular season games, starting at both left and right guard, and was named a divisional and CFL All-Star for the first time in his career. He also started in both post-season games, including the team's 108th Grey Cup victory over the Hamilton Tiger-Cats. In the 2022 season, Neufeld played and started in 17 regular season games and was again named a CFL All-Star. He started in the 109th Grey Cup, but the Blue Bombers lost 24–23 to the Toronto Argonauts.

Neufeld dressed in all 18 regular season games in 2023, starting in 17, where he was named a CFL All-Star for the third consecutive season. He started in both post-season games that year, but the team again lost in the championship game, this time to the Montreal Alouettes on the 110th Grey Cup. In the 2024 season, he played and started in 14 regular season games and both post-season games, but the Blue Bombers lost to the Argonauts in the 111th Grey Cup.
