= Kyle Graves =

Canadian gridiron football player and coach (born 1989)

Profile
- Position: Wide receiver

Personal information
- Born: October 12, 1989 (age 37); Barrie, Ontario, Canada
- Listed height: 6 ft 3 in (1.91 m)
- Listed weight: 220 lb (100 kg)

Career information
- High school: Bear Creek Secondary
- University: Acadia
- CFL draft: 2012: undrafted

Career history

Playing
- 2012: Montreal Alouettes*
- 2013–2016: Montreal Alouettes
- 2017: Toronto Argonauts
- * Offseason or practice squad member only

Coaching
- 2017: Acadia Axemen
- 2019–2020: Mount Allison Mounties

Awards and highlights
- 2011 AUS Most Valuable Player; 2012 All-Canadian Team punter and second -team quarterback
- Stats at CFL.ca

Kyle Graves (born October 12, 1989) is a Canadian former professional football wide receiver who played for five years in the Canadian Football League (CFL). He was signed as an undrafted free agent by the Montreal Alouettes after being bypassed in the 2012 CFL draft. He played quarterback and punter for the Acadia Axemen in Canadian Interuniversity Sport football from 2008 to 2012. He also spent time as the offensive coordinator for the Mount Allison Mounties of U Sports football.

== University career ==
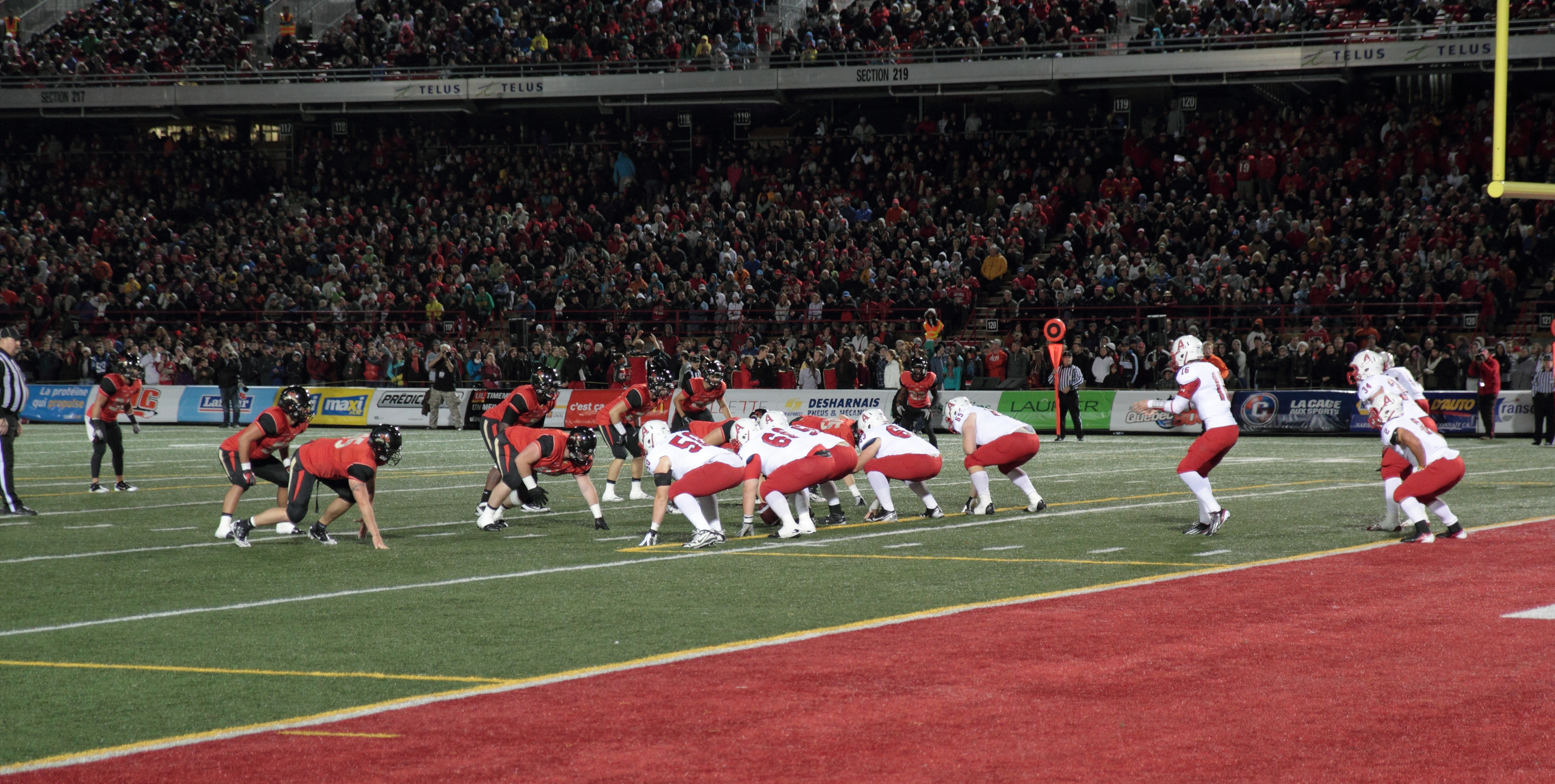
Kyle Graves (#16) lined up under centre at quarterback for the Acadia Axemen against the Laval Rouge et Or during the 2012 CIS football season.

Graves was recruited by the Acadia Axemen and head coach Jeff Cummins in 2008 to play quarterback for their football program. He played primarily as a back-up quarterback in 2008 and 2009, playing behind incumbent starter, Keith Lockwood. In 2010, he became the team's starting quarterback, completing 110 passes out of 203 attempts (54.2%) for 1,120 yards for six touchdowns and ten interceptions. Graves also became the team's punter that year, with 61 punts and a 34.5-yard average. The team improved upon their 2–6 record in 2009 and finished 4–4 with a loss to the Saint Mary's Huskies in the Loney Bowl.

The 2011 season was a breakout year for Graves and the Axemen as he led the team to a 7–1 record (the best Acadia record in over 25 years) and led them to the first Jewett Trophy since 2006. The season ended with a defeat in the Uteck Bowl in Moncton Stadium to Kyle Quinlan's McMaster Marauders, who would go on to win the 47th Vanier Cup. In regular season play, he completed 121 of 204 pass attempts (59.3%) for 1,856 yards with 17 passing touchdowns to five interceptions. He also had 32 carries for 179 yards and a rushing touchdown as well as 64 punts with a 36.7-yard average. At season's end, he was named the AUS Most Valuable Player and a 2011 AUS All-star at quarterback and punter.

Graves led the Axemen to a 7–1 record in 2012 and a second consecutive Loney Bowl championship, before losing to the Laval Rouge et Or in the Uteck Bowl. He was named a first-team All-Canadian at punter after leading the AUS with a 40.3-yard punting average. He was again named the AUS MVP and was also named a second-team All-Canadian at quarterback that year. In 2012, he threw for 2,012 yards with 14 passing touchdowns to four interceptions and completed 57.1% of his passes.

He finished his CIS football career as Acadia's third all-time leading passer with 5,433 yards, finished second in pass completions with 418, and fourth in passing touchdowns with 39.

== Professional career ==
=== Montreal Alouettes ===
After going being bypassed in the 2012 CFL draft, Graves was signed by the Montreal Alouettes on May 9, 2012. He was signed shortly after the team signed Kyle Quinlan, another Canadian quarterback, with both players being brought to training camp to compete as quarterbacks. Graves was released shortly after the Alouettes second pre-season game and returned to Acadia to play his fifth and final year of college eligibility.

Graves re-signed with the Alouettes on February 6, 2013, but was cut during training camp in June that year. He re-joined the Alouettes on August 26, 2013, and dressed for his first game on September 21, 2013, in Touchdown Atlantic in Moncton Stadium, the same stadium he played in the Uteck Bowl in 2011. In total, he dressed for six games in 2013 as a reserve wide receiver, wearing number 88.

In 2014, he dressed for 10 regular season games and two post-season games for the Alouettes as a back-up receiver, while also switching to number 81. He was on the team's injured reserve with a knee injury for most of the 2015 season, while being a healthy scratch for two games. In 2016, he dressed in all 18 regular season games as the team's field goal holder. He had his first reception in a game against the Ottawa Redblacks on June 30, 2016, and finished the year with two catches for 19 yards. He also saw duty as the team's back-up punter that year, recording four punts with a 36.8-yard average.

On February 13, 2017, one day before free agency, Graves signed a two-year contract extension with the Alouettes. However, he was released on April 10, 2017.

=== Toronto Argonauts ===
On April 21, 2017, it was announced that Graves had signed with the Toronto Argonauts. He made the team following training camp and played in the first four games of the season, but after being relegated to the practice roster, he was eventually released on August 7, 2017.

== Coaching career ==
=== Acadia Axemen ===
Graves began his coaching career with his alma mater, the Acadia Axemen, where he served as the co-offensive coordinator.

=== Mount Allison Mounties ===
For the 2019 U Sports football season, Graves joined the Mount Allison Mounties as the team's offensive coordinator.
