= 2011 CIS football season =

- Duration: September 1, 2011 – October 29, 2011
- Hardy Cup champions: Calgary Dinos
- Yates Cup champions: McMaster Marauders
- Dunsmore Cup champions: Laval Rouge et Or
- Loney Bowl champions: Acadia Axemen
- Mitchell Bowl champions: Laval Rouge et Or
- Uteck Bowl champions: McMaster Marauders

Vanier Cup
- Date: November 25, 2011
- Venue: BC Place Stadium, Vancouver, British Columbia
- Champions: McMaster Marauders

CIS football seasons seasons
- 2010 2012

The 2011 CIS football season began on September 1, 2011, with the Montreal Carabins hosting the McGill Redmen at CEPSUM Stadium. The season concluded on November 25 at BC Place Stadium in Vancouver, British Columbia with the 47th Vanier Cup championship. This year, 26 university teams in Canada played CIS football, the highest level of amateur Canadian football.

== Regular season standings ==
2011 Canada West standings
Team (Rank)	W		L	PTS	Playoff Spot
#2 Calgary	8	-	0	16	†
#6 UBC*	0	-	8	0	X
#10 Saskatchewan	5	-	3	10	X
Regina	5	-	3	10	X
Manitoba	4	-	4	8	
Alberta	2	-	6	4	
*UBC forfeited all six wins due to use of an ineligible player † – Conference Champion; Rankings: CIS Top 10

2011 RSEQ standings
	Overall				Conf			Playoff Spot
Team (Rank)	W		L	PTS	W		L	Playoff Spot
#1 Laval	8	-	1	16	8	-	1	†
#5 Sherbrooke	7	-	2	14	7	-	2	X
#7 Montreal	6	-	3	12	5	-	3	X
Concordia	4	-	5	8	3	-	5	X
Bishop's	3	-	6	6	2	-	6	
McGill	0	-	9	0	0	-	8	
† – Conference Champion; Rankings: CIS Top 10

2011 OUA standings
Team (Rank)	W		L	PTS	Playoff Spot
#3 Western	7	-	1	14	†
#4 McMaster	7	-	1	14	X
#8 Queen's	6	-	2	12	X
Ottawa	5	-	3	10	X
Windsor	5	-	3	10	X
Laurier	4	-	4	8	X
Toronto	3	-	5	6	
Guelph	2	-	6	4	
York	1	-	7	2	
Waterloo	0	-	8	0	
† – Conference Champion; Rankings: CIS Top 10

2011 AUS standings
	Overall				Conf			Playoff Spot
Team (Rank)	W		L	PTS	W		L	Playoff Spot
#9 Acadia	7	-	1	14	6	-	1	†
Saint Mary's	6	-	2	12	6	-	1	X
St. FX	2	-	6	2	2	-	5	X
Mount Allison	0	-	8	0	0	-	7	
† – Conference Champion; Rankings: CIS Top 10

=== Top 10 ===
FRC-CIS top 10 rankings
	01	02	03	04	05	06	07	08	09	10
Acadia Axemen	12	NR	14	12	14	12	12	12	9	9
Alberta Golden Bears	NR	NR	NR	NR	NR	NR	NR	NR	NR	NR
Bishop's Gaiters	NR	NR	NR	NR	NR	NR	NR	NR	NR	NR
Calgary Dinos	4	4	3	3	3	3	2	2	1	2
Concordia Stingers	11	12	12	14	13	13	14	NR	NR	NR
Guelph Gryphons	15	NR	NR	NR	NR	NR	NR	NR	NR	NR
Laurier Golden Hawks	10	8	13	NR	15	11	13	13	NR	NR
Laval Rouge et Or	1	1	1	1	1	1	3	3	2	1
Manitoba Bisons	NR	14	15	10	12	NR	NR	NR	NR	NR
McGill Redmen	NR	NR	NR	NR	NR	NR	NR	NR	NR	NR
McMaster Marauders	3	3	7	6	6	5	6	5	3	4
Montreal Carabins	7	6	6	4	4	6	5	6	5	7
Mount Allison Mounties	NR	NR	NR	NR	NR	NR	NR	NR	NR	NR
Ottawa Gee-Gees	13	11	9	13	10	NR	10	9	12	NR
Queen's Golden Gaels	14	NR	NR	16	NR	14	11	11	8	8
Regina Rams	6	13	NR	NR	NR	NR	NR	NR	NR	NR
Saint Mary's Huskies	9	9	8	8	7	8	8	7	11	12
Saskatchewan Huskies	5	5	4	7	9	7	7	10	10	10
Sherbrooke Vert et Or	8	7	5	5	5	4	4	4	6	5
St. Francis Xavier X-Men	NR	NR	NR	NR	NR	NR	NR	NR	NR	NR
Toronto Varsity Blues	NR	NR	NR	15	NR	NR	NR	NR	NR	NR
UBC Thunderbirds	16	10	11	9	8	9	9	8	7	6
Western Mustangs	2	2	2	2	2	2	1	1	4	3
Windsor Lancers	NR	NR	10	11	11	10	NR	NR	13	11
York Lions	NR	NR	NR	NR	NR	NR	NR	NR	NR	NR

Ranks in italics are teams not ranked in the top 10 poll but received votes. NR = Not ranked, received no votes.

=== Championships ===
The Vanier Cup is played between the champions of the Mitchell Bowl and the Uteck Bowl, the national semi-final games. In 2011, according to the rotating schedule, the Atlantic conference Loney Bowl champions will meet the Ontario conference's Yates Cup champion for the Uteck Bowl. The winners of the Canada West conference Hardy Trophy will host the Dunsmore Cup Quebec championship team for the Mitchell Bowl.

==== Playoff bracket ====
Conference quarter-finals
Laurier Golden Hawks	10
Queen's Golden Gaels	14
Windsor Lancers	50
Ottawa Gee-Gees	33

Conference semi-finals
Montreal Carabins	33
Sherbrooke Vert et Or	15
Concordia Stingers	7
Laval Rouge et Or	33
Saskatchewan Huskies	22
UBC Thunderbirds	27
Regina Rams	4
Calgary Dinos	16
Queen's Golden Gaels	13
McMaster Marauders	40
Windsor Lancers	27
Western Ontario Mustangs	33
St. FX X-Men	2
Saint Mary's Huskies	25

Conference championships
Montreal Carabins	7
Laval Rouge et Or	30
UBC Thunderbirds	13
Calgary Dinos	62
McMaster Marauders	41
Western Ontario Mustangs	19
Saint Mary's Huskies	20
Acadia Axemen	39

National semi-finals
Laval Rouge et Or	41
Calgary Dinos	10
McMaster Marauders	45
Acadia Axemen	21

47th Vanier Cup
Laval Rouge et Or	38
McMaster Marauders	41

== Post-season awards ==
CIS post-season awards
	Quebec	Ontario	Atlantic	Canada West	NATIONAL
Hec Crighton Trophy	Simon Charbonneau-Campeau (Sherbrooke)	Michael DiCroce (McMaster)	Kyle Graves (Acadia)	Billy Greene (UBC)	Billy Greene (UBC)
Presidents' Trophy	Max Caron (Concordia)	Ryan Chmielewski (McMaster)	Tom Labenski (Acadia)	Sam Hurl (Calgary)	Max Caron (Concordia)
J. P. Metras Trophy	Arnaud Gascon-Nadon (Laval)	Osie Ukwuoma (Queen's)	Jake Thomas (Acadia)	Akiem Hicks (Regina)	Arnaud Gascon-Nadon (Laval)
Peter Gorman Trophy	Jérémi Doyon-Roch (Sherbrooke)	Tyler Varga (Western Ontario)	Jacob LeBlanc (Mount Allison)	Jordan Arkko (Saskatchewan)	Tyler Varga (Western Ontario)
Russ Jackson Award	Austin Anderson (McGill)	Dillon Heap (Wilfrid Laurier)	Andrew Frazer (Acadia)	Brett Jones (Regina)	Dillon Heap (Wilfrid Laurier)
Frank Tindall Trophy	André Bolduc (Sherbrooke)	Joe D'Amore (Windsor)	Jeff Cummins (Acadia)	Shawn Olson (UBC)	Jeff Cummins (Acadia)

=== All-Canadian team ===
==== First team ====
Offence
Billy Greene, QB, UBC
Steven Lumbala, RB, Calgary
Anthony Coombs, RB, Manitoba
Simon Charbonneau-Campeau, WR, Sherbrooke
Michael DiCroce, WR, McMaster
Jordan Brescacin, IR, Windsor
Michael Squires, IR, Acadia
Pierre Lavertu, C, Laval
Kirby Fabien, OT, Calgary
Brendan Dunn, OT, Western Ontario
Matthew Norman, G, Western Ontario
Brett Jones, G, Regina
Defence
Stefan Charles, DT, Regina
Seamus Postuma, DT, Windsor
Akiem Hicks, DE, Regina
Arnaud Gascon-Nadon, DE, Laval
Max Caron, LB, Concordia
Samuel Hurl, LB, Calgary
Kevin Régimbald Gagné, LB, Sherbrooke
Teague Sherman, FS, Manitoba
Cameron Wade, HB, Acadia
Beau Landry, HB, Western Ontario
Dominic Noël, CB, Laval
Kayin Marchand-Wright, CB, Saint Mary's
Special teams
Chris Bodnar, P, Regina
Tyler Crapigna, K, McMaster
Kris Robertson, RET, Concordia

==== Second team ====
Offence
Kyle Quinlan, QB, McMaster
Ryan Granberg, RB, Queen's
Sébastien Lévesque, RB, Laval
Dustin Zender, WR, Waterloo
Jordan Grieve, WR, UBC
Dillon Heap, IR, Wilfrid Laurier
Alexander Fox, IR, Bishop's
Quinn McCaughan, C, Calgary
Matthew Sewell, OT, McMaster
Ben Heenan, OT, Saskatchewan
Jason Medeiros, G, McMaster
Reed Alexander, G, Calgary
Defence
Linden Gaydosh, DT, Calgary
Jake Thomas, DT, Acadia
Jonathan Pierre-Etienne, DE, Montreal
Rob Jubenville, DE, Saint Mary's
Jordan Verdone, LB, Calgary
Jonathan Beaulieu-Richard, LB, Montreal
Sam Sabourin, LB, Queen's
Jonathan Laliberté, FS, Laval
Matt McGarva, HB, Windsor
Patrick Chénard, HB, Sherbrooke
Sam Carino, CB, UBC
Andrew Lue, CB, Queen's
Special teams
Darryl Wheeler, P, Western Ontario
Johnny Mark, K, Calgary
Nic Demski, RET, Manitoba

== Teams ==
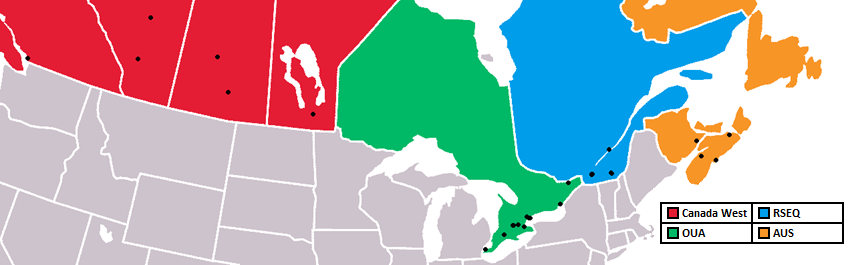

Canada West Universities Athletic Association Hardy Trophy
Institution	Team	City	Province	First season	Head coach	Enrollment	Endowment	Football stadium	Capacity
University of British Columbia	Thunderbirds	Vancouver	BC	1923	Shawn Olson	43,579	$1.01B	Thunderbird Stadium	3,500
University of Calgary	Dinos	Calgary	AB	1964	Blake Nill	28,196	$444M	McMahon Stadium	35,650
University of Alberta	Golden Bears	Edmonton	AB	1910	Jeff Stead	36,435	$751M	Foote Field	3,500
University of Saskatchewan	Huskies	Saskatoon	SK	1912	Brian Towriss	19,082	$136.7M	Griffiths Stadium	6,171
University of Regina	Rams	Regina	SK	1999	Frank McCrystal	12,800	$25.9M	Mosaic Stadium at Taylor Field	28,800
University of Manitoba	Bisons	Winnipeg	MB	1920	Brian Dobie	27,599	$303M	University Stadium	5,000

Ontario University Athletics Yates Cup
Institution	Team	City	Province	First season	Head coach	Enrollment	Endowment	Football stadium	Capacity
University of Windsor	Lancers	Windsor	ON	1968	Joe D'Amore	13,496	$32.5M	South Campus Stadium	2,000
University of Western Ontario	Mustangs	London	ON	1929	Greg Marshall	30,000	$266.6M	TD Waterhouse Stadium	10,000
University of Waterloo	Warriors	Waterloo	ON	1957	Dennis McPhee	27,978	$172M	Warrior Field	1,100
Wilfrid Laurier University	Golden Hawks	Waterloo	ON	1961	Gary Jeffries	12,394	---	University Stadium	6,000
University of Guelph	Gryphons	Guelph	ON	1950	Stu Lang	19,408	$164.2M	Alumni Stadium	4,100
McMaster University	Marauders	Hamilton	ON	1901	Stefan Ptaszek	25,688	$498.5M	Ron Joyce Stadium	6,000
University of Toronto	Varsity Blues	Toronto	ON	1877	Greg Gary	73,185	$1.823B	Varsity Stadium	5,000
York University	Lions	Toronto	ON	1969	Warren Craney	42,400	$306M	York Stadium	4,000
Queen's University	Golden Gaels	Kingston	ON	1882	Pat Sheahan	20,566	$657M	Richardson Stadium	10,258
University of Ottawa	Gee-Gees	Ottawa	ON	1894	Jean Philippe-Asselin	35,548	$128.4M	Frank Clair Stadium	14,542

Quebec University Football League Dunsmore Cup
Institution	Team	City	Province	First season	Head coach	Enrollment	Endowment	Football stadium	Capacity
Concordia University	Stingers	Montreal	QC	1974	Gerry McGrath	38,809	$54.4M	Concordia Stadium	4,000
Université de Montréal	Carabins	Montreal	QC	2002	Danny Maciocia	55,540	$89.5M	CEPSUM Stadium	5,100
McGill University	Redmen	Montreal	QC	1898	Clint Uttley	32,514	$973.6M	Molson Stadium	25,012
Université Laval	Rouge et Or	Quebec City	QC	1996	Glen Constantin	37,591	$105.3M	PEPS Stadium	12,257
Université de Sherbrooke	Vert et Or	Sherbrooke	QC	1971	André Bolduc	35,000	---	Université de Sherbrooke Stadium	3,359
Bishop's University	Gaiters	Sherbrooke	QC	1884	Tony Addona	1,817	---	Coulter Field	3,000

Atlantic University Sport Jewett Trophy
Institution	Team	City	Province	First season	Head coach	Enrollment	Endowment	Football stadium	Capacity
Acadia University	Axemen	Wolfville	NS	1957	Jeff Cummins	3,770	$40M	Raymond Field	3,000
Mount Allison University	Mounties	Sackville	NB	1955	Kelly Jeffrey	2,614	$82.8M	MacAulay Field	2,500
Saint Francis Xavier University	X-Men	Antigonish	NS	1954	Gary Waterman	4,871	$59.4M	Oland Stadium	4,000
Saint Mary's University	Huskies	Halifax	NS	1956	Steve Sumarah	7,433	$16.9M	Huskies Stadium	4,000
