= 2012 CIS football season =

- Duration: August 31, 2012 – October 27, 2012
- Hardy Cup champions: Calgary Dinos
- Yates Cup champions: McMaster Marauders
- Dunsmore Cup champions: Laval Rouge et Or
- Loney Bowl champions: Acadia Axemen
- Mitchell Bowl champions: McMaster Marauders
- Uteck Bowl champions: Laval Rouge et Or

Vanier Cup
- Date: November 23, 2012
- Venue: Toronto, Ontario
- Champions: Laval Rouge et Or

CIS football seasons seasons
- 2011 2013

The 2012 CIS football season began on August 31, 2012 with the Saskatchewan Huskies hosting the Alberta Golden Bears at Griffiths Stadium. The season concluded on November 23 in Toronto, Ontario with the 48th Vanier Cup championship, won by the Laval Rouge et Or after they defeated the McMaster Marauders 37-14. This year, 26 university teams in Canada are scheduled to play Canadian Interuniversity Sport football, the highest level of amateur Canadian football.

== Regular season standings ==
2012 Canada West standings
Team (Rank)	W		L	PTS	Playoff Spot
#2 Calgary	7	-	1	14	†
#7 Regina	6	-	2	12	X
Saskatchewan	5	-	3	10	X
#10 Manitoba	4	-	4	8	X
UBC	2	-	6	4	
Alberta	0	-	8	0	
† – Conference Champion; Rankings: CIS Top 10

2012 RSEQ standings
	Overall				Conf			Playoff Spot
Team (Rank)	W		L	PTS	W		L	Playoff Spot
#2 Laval	8	-	1	16	7	-	1	†
#4 Montreal	8	-	1	16	8	-	1	X
Sherbrooke	6	-	3	12	5	-	3	X
McGill	2	-	7	4	1	-	7	X
Bishop's^{b}	2	-	7	4	2	-	7	
Concordia^{a}	1	-	8	2	1	-	7	
† – Conference Champion; Rankings: CIS Top 10^{a} - Forfeited 2 wins for ineligible player.^{b} - Forfeited two game for use of an ineligible player. One game against Montreal was a loss and the result unchanged. The other game was previously forfeited by Concordia and was recorded as a double forfeit of 0-0.

2012 OUA standings
Team (Rank)	W		L	PTS	Playoff Spot
#1 McMaster	8	-	0	16	†
#5 Guelph	7	-	1	14	X
#6 Queen's	6	-	2	12	X
#8 Western	5	-	3	10	X
Windsor	3	-	5	6	X
Laurier	3	-	5	6	X
York	2	-	6	4	
Ottawa	2	-	6	4	
Toronto	2	-	6	4	
Waterloo	2	-	6	4	
† – Conference Champion; Rankings: CIS Top 10

2012 AUS standings
	Overall				Conf			Playoff Spot
Team (Rank)	W		L	PTS	W		L	Playoff Spot
#9 Acadia	7	-	1	14	7	-	0	†
Saint Mary's	3	-	5	6	3	-	4	X
Mount Allison	3	-	5	6	3	-	4	X
St. FX^{a}	2	-	6	4	1	-	6	
† – Conference Champion; Rankings: CIS Top 10^{a} - Awarded a win over Concordia due to the Stingers using an ineligible player.

=== Top 10 ===
FRC-CIS Top 10 Rankings
	1	2	3	4	5	6	7	8	9	10
Acadia Axemen	9 (51)	9 (51)	8 (76)	11 (19)	11 (21)	10 (41)	10 (43)	9 (53)	9 (39)	9 (48)
Alberta Golden Bears	NR	NR	NR	NR	NR	NR	NR	NR	NR	NR
Bishop's Gaiters	NR	NR	NR	NR	NR	NR	NR	NR	NR	NR
Calgary Dinos	3 (246-1)	3 (249)	2 (256)	2 (267-1)	2 (268-1)	2 (270-1)	2 (268-1)	2 (270-1)	3 (225)	3 (229)
Concordia Stingers	15 (3)	13 (5)	NR	14 (1)	NR	NR	NR	NR	NR	NR
Guelph Gryphons	13 (23)	14 (2)	12 (13)	13 (5)	12 (17)	9 (50)	7 (114)	5 (177)	5 (169)	5 (167)
Laurier Golden Hawks	16 (2)	NR	NR	NR	NR	NR	NR	NR	NR	NR
Laval Rouge et Or	2 (257-4)	2 (256)	3 (224)	4 (220)	4 (223)	4 (220)	3 (243)	3 (238)	2 (266)	2 (266)
Manitoba Bisons	14 (6)	10 (44)	7 (126)	8 (89)	8 (92)	8 (87)	8 (94)	10 (22)	10 (28)	12 (7)
McGill Redmen	NR	NR	NR	NR	NR	NR	NR	NR	NR	NR
McMaster Marauders	1 (294-25)	1 (300-30)	1 (300-30)	1 (299-29)	1 (299-29)	1 (299-29)	1 (299-29)	1 (299-29)	1 (300-30)	1 (300-30)
Montreal Carabins	4 (180)	4 (220)	4 (210)	3 (231)	3 (223)	3 (236)	5 (180)	4 (212)	4 (224)	4 (219)
Mount Allison Mounties	NR	NR	NR	NR	NR	NR	NR	NR	NR	NR
Ottawa Gee-Gees	NR	NR	NR	NR	NR	NR	NR	NR	NR	NR
Queen's Golden Gaels	6 (121)	6 (156)	6 (160)	5 (184)	5 (162)	5 (175)	4 (190)	6 (161)	6 (140)	6 (146)
Regina Rams	12 (35)	12 (8)	10 (31)	9 (70)	7 (129)	6 (157)	6 (146)	8 (84)	7 (139)	7 (138)
Saint Mary's Huskies	NR	NR	NR	NR	NR	NR	NR	NR	NR	NR
Saskatchewan Huskies	8 (81)	8 (93)	9 (39)	7 (89)	10 (25)	13 (3)	NR	11 (18)	12 (4)	11 (9)
Sherbrooke Vert et Or	11 (45)	15 (1)	11 (14)	10 (35)	9 (32)	11 (10)	11 (7)	12 (16)	11 (27)	10 (33)
St. Francis Xavier X-Men	NR	NR	14 (2)	NR	NR	NR	NR	NR	NR	NR
Toronto Varsity Blues	NR	16 (1)	NR	NR	NR	NR	NR	NR	NR	NR
UBC Thunderbirds	7 (100)	11 (12)	NR	15 (1)	NR	NR	NR	NR	NR	NR
Waterloo Warriors	NR	NR	NR	NR	NR	NR	NR	NR	NR	NR
Western Mustangs	5 (142)	5 (161)	5 (177)	6 (141)	6 (143)	7 (115)	9 (48)	7 (98)	8 (89)	8 (88)
Windsor Lancers	10 (50)	7 (95)	13 (4)	12 (6)	13 (1)	12 (5)	NR	NR	NR	NR
York Lions	NR	NR	NR	NR	NR	NR	NR	NR	NR	NR

Ranks in italics are teams not ranked in the top 10 poll but received votes.
NR = Not ranked, received no votes.
Number in parentheses denotes number votes, after the dash number of first place votes.

=== Championships ===
The Vanier Cup is played between the champions of the Mitchell Bowl and the Uteck Bowl, the national semi-final games. In 2012, according to the rotating schedule, the Atlantic conference Loney Bowl champions (Acadia Axemen) met the Dunsmore Cup Quebec championship team (Laval Rouge et Or) for the Uteck Bowl. The Laval Rouge et Or defeated the Acadia Axemen in this game. The winners of the Canada West conference Hardy Trophy (Calgary Dinos) visited the Ontario conference's Yates Cup champion (McMaster Marauders) for the Mitchell Bowl. The Laval Rouge et Or defeated the McMaster Marauders 37-14 in the Vanier Cup to earn their seventh title.

==== Playoff bracket ====
Conference Quarter-finals
Laurier Golden Hawks	0
Queen's Golden Gaels	34
Windsor Lancers	35
Western Ontario Mustangs	56

Conference Semi-finals
Saskatchewan Huskies	9
Regina Rams	31
Manitoba Bisons	18
Calgary Dinos	57
Queen's Golden Gaels	39
Guelph Gryphons	42
Western Ontario Mustangs	28
McMaster Marauders	42
Saint Mary's Huskies	49
Mount Allison Mounties	11
Sherbrooke Vert et Or	42
Montreal Carabins	24
McGill Redmen	9
Laval Rouge et Or	46

Conference Championships
Regina Rams	14
Calgary Dinos	38
Guelph Gryphons	13
McMaster Marauders	30
Saint Mary's Huskies	9
Acadia Axemen	17
Sherbrooke Vert et Or	17
Laval Rouge et Or	40

National Semi-finals
Calgary Dinos	6
McMaster Marauders	45
Acadia Axemen	7
Laval Rouge et Or	42

48th Vanier Cup
McMaster Marauders	14
Laval Rouge et Or	37

== Post-Season Awards ==
CIS Post-Season Awards
	Quebec	Ontario	Atlantic	Canada West	NATIONAL
Hec Crighton Trophy	Rotrand Sené (Montreal)	Kyle Quinlan (McMaster)	Kyle Graves (Acadia)	Eric Dzwilewski (Calgary)	Kyle Quinlan (McMaster)
Presidents' Trophy	Frédéric Plesius (Laval)	Aram Eisho (McMaster)	Brett Hubbeard (St. Francis Xavier)	Mike Edem (Calgary)	Frédéric Plesius (Laval)
J. P. Metras Trophy	Jean-Samuel Blanc (Montreal)	Ben D'Aguilar (McMaster)	Rob Jubenville (Saint Mary's)	Brett Jones (Regina)	Ben D'Aguilar (McMaster)
Peter Gorman Trophy	Shaquille Johnson (McGill)	Yannick Harou (Western)	Thomas Troop (Acadia)	Brett Blaszko (Calgary)	Shaquille Johnson (McGill)
Russ Jackson Award	David Haddrall (Bishop's)	Zach Androschuk (Guelph)	Matthew Albright (Saint Mary's)	Brett Jones (Regina)	Zach Androschuk (Guelph)
Frank Tindall Trophy	Glen Constantin (Laval)	Stefan Ptaszek (McMaster)	Jeff Cummins (Acadia)	Blake Nill (Calgary)	Stefan Ptaszek (McMaster)

=== All-Canadian Team ===
==== First Team ====
Offence
Kyle Quinlan, QB, McMaster
Garrett Sanvido, RB, Western
Steven Lumbala, RB, Calgary
Kit Hillis, WR, Saskatchewan
Nick Anapolsky, WR, Waterloo
Jordan Brescacin, IR, Windsor
Michael Squires, IR, Acadia
Pierre Lavertu, C, Laval
Kirby Fabien, OT, Calgary
Laurent Duvernay-Tardif, OT, McGill
Jason Medeiros, G, McMaster
Brett Jones, G, Regina
Defence
David Rybinski, DT, Saskatchewan
Daryl Waud, DT, Western
Ben D'Aguilar, DE, McMaster
Jean-Samuel Blanc, DE, Montreal
Aram Eisho, LB, McMaster
Frédéric Plesius, LB, Laval
Mathieu Masseau, SAM, Laval
Teague Sherman, FS, Manitoba
Tijani Chase-Dunawa, HB, Queen's
Kirby Kezama, HB, Regina
Jamir Walker, CB, Regina
Joey Cupido, CB, McMaster
Special Teams
Kyle Graves, P, Acadia
Tyler Crapigna, K, McMaster
Nic Demski, RET, Manitoba

==== Second Team ====
Offence
Kyle Graves, QB, Acadia
Anthony Coombs, RB, Manitoba
Ryan Granberg, RB, Queen's
Shaq Johnson, WR, McGill
Taylor Renaud, WR, Acadia
Chris Dobko, IR, Calgary
Robert Babic, IR, McMaster
Quinn McCaughan, C, Calgary
Matt Sewell, OT, McMaster
Christopher Mercer, OT, Regina
Charles Vaillancourt, G, Laval
Colin Murray, G, Acadia
Defence
Jacob LeBlanc, DT, Mount Allison
John Miniaci, DT, Queen's
Arnaud Gascon-Nadon, DE, Laval
Rob Jubenville, DE, Saint Mary's
Sam Sabourin, LB, Queen's
Brett Hubbeard, LB, St Francis Xavier
Steve Famulak, LB, Regina
Michael Daly, FS, McMaster
Antoine Pruneau, HB, Montreal
Cameron Wade, HB, Acadia
Kayin Marchand-Wright, CB, Saint Mary's
Fode Yansane, CB, Montreal
Special Teams
Chris Bodnar, P, Regina
Johnny Mark, K, Calgary
Kris Robertson, RET, Concordia

== Teams ==
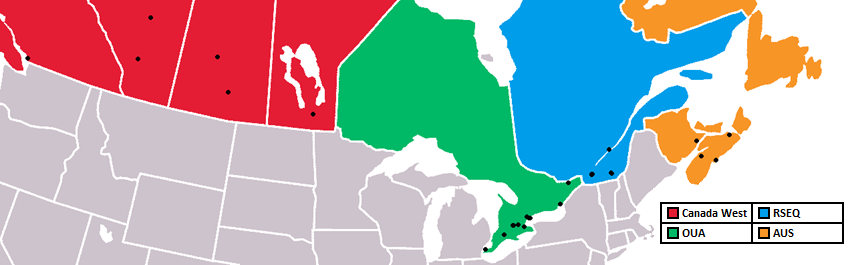

Canada West Football Conference Hardy Trophy
Institution	Team	City	Province	First season	Head coach	Enrollment	Endowment	Football stadium	Capacity
University of British Columbia	Thunderbirds	Vancouver	BC	1923	Shawn Olson	43,579	$1.05B	Thunderbird Stadium	3,500
University of Calgary	Dinos	Calgary	AB	1964	Blake Nill	28,196	$516.7M	McMahon Stadium	35,650
University of Alberta	Golden Bears	Edmonton	AB	1910	Jeff Stead	36,435	$800.3M	Foote Field	3,500
University of Saskatchewan	Huskies	Saskatoon	SK	1912	Brian Towriss	19,082	$214M	Griffiths Stadium	6,171
University of Regina	Rams	Regina	SK	1999	Frank McCrystal	12,800	$27.4M	Mosaic Stadium at Taylor Field	32,848
University of Manitoba	Bisons	Winnipeg	MB	1920	Brian Dobie	27,599	$357M	University Stadium	5,000

Ontario University Athletics Yates Cup
Institution	Team	City	Province	First season	Head coach	Enrollment	Endowment	Football stadium	Capacity
University of Windsor	Lancers	Windsor	ON	1968	Joe D'Amore	13,496	$65.3M	South Campus Stadium	2,000
University of Western Ontario	Mustangs	London	ON	1929	Greg Marshall	30,000	$371.7M	TD Waterhouse Stadium	10,000
University of Waterloo	Warriors	Waterloo	ON	1957	Joe Paopao	27,978	$247.3M	Warrior Field	5,200
Wilfrid Laurier University	Golden Hawks	Waterloo	ON	1961	Gary Jeffries	12,394	$70.1M	University Stadium	6,000
University of Guelph	Gryphons	Guelph	ON	1950	Stu Lang	19,408	$228.2M	Alumni Stadium	4,100
McMaster University	McMaster Marauders	Hamilton	ON	1901	Stefan Ptaszek	25,688	$519.2M	Ron Joyce Stadium	6,000
University of Toronto	Varsity Blues	Toronto	ON	1877	Greg Gary	73,185	$1.518B	Varsity Stadium	5,000
York University	Lions	Toronto	ON	1969	Warren Craney	42,400	$331.1M	York Stadium	2,500
Queen's University	Golden Gaels	Kingston	ON	1882	Pat Sheahan	20,566	$584.4M	Richardson Stadium	10,258
University of Ottawa	Gee-Gees	Ottawa	ON	1894	Gary Etcheverry	35,548	$183.9M	Beckwith Stadium	1,500

Quebec University Football League Dunsmore Cup
Institution	Team	City	Province	First season	Head coach	Enrollment	Endowment	Football stadium	Capacity
Concordia University	Stingers	Montreal	QC	1974	Gerry McGrath	38,809	---	Concordia Stadium	4,000
Université de Montréal	Carabins	Montreal	QC	2002	Danny Maciocia	55,540	$133.9	CEPSUM Stadium	5,100
McGill University	Redmen	Montreal	QC	1898	Clint Uttley	32,514	$920.8M	Molson Stadium	25,012
Université Laval	Rouge et Or	Quebec City	QC	1996	Glen Constantin	37,591	---	PEPS Stadium	12,257
Université de Sherbrooke	Vert et Or	Sherbrooke	QC	1971	David Lessard	35,000	---	Université de Sherbrooke Stadium	3,359
Bishop's University	Gaiters	Sherbrooke	QC	1884	Kevin Mackey	1,817	---	Coulter Field	2,200

Atlantic University Football Conference Jewett Trophy
Institution	Team	City	Province	First season	Head coach	Enrollment	Endowment	Football stadium	Capacity
Acadia University	Axemen	Wolfville	NS	1957	Jeff Cummins	3,770	$57.4M	Raymond Field	3,000
Mount Allison University	Mounties	Sackville	NB	1955	Kelly Jeffrey	2,614	$111.1M	MacAulay Field	2,500
Saint Francis Xavier University	X-Men	Antigonish	NS	1954	Gary Waterman	4,871	$90.05M	Oland Stadium	4,000
Saint Mary's University	Huskies	Halifax	NS	1956	Perry Marchese	7,433	$22.7M	Huskies Stadium	4,000
