= 2012 Saskatchewan Huskies football team =

College football season

2012 Saskatchewan Huskies football
- Conference: Canada West Universities Athletic Association
- Record: 5–4 (5–3 Canada West)
- Head coach: Brian Towriss
- Offensive coordinator: Mike Harrington; Travis Serke; Bart Arnold; Brent Schneider; Jason Sulz
- Defensive coordinator: Ed Carleton; Darrell Burko; Wade Dupont; Aaron Moser; Doug Humbert
- Home stadium: Griffiths Stadium

2012 Canada West standings
Team (Rank)	W		L	PTS	Playoff Spot
#2 Calgary	7	-	1	14	†
#7 Regina	6	-	2	12	X
Saskatchewan	5	-	3	10	X
#10 Manitoba	4	-	4	8	X
UBC	2	-	6	4	
Alberta	0	-	8	0	
† – Conference Champion; Rankings: CIS Top 10

The 2012 Saskatchewan Huskies football team represented the University of Saskatchewan in the 2012 CIS university football season. They played their home games at Griffiths Stadium in Saskatoon, Saskatchewan. The team had hopes to win Canada West and to advance to the Vanier Cup for the first time in 6 years, however they lost to the Regina Rams in the Canada West Semi-Final.

== Recruiting ==
Back	B	Centre	C	Cornerback	CB	Defensive back	DB
Defensive end	DE	Defensive lineman	DL	Defensive tackle	DT	End	E
Fullback	FB	Guard	G	Halfback	HB	Kicker	K
Kickoff returner	KR	Offensive tackle	OT	Offensive lineman	OL	Linebacker	LB
Long snapper	LS	Punter	P	Punt returner	PR	Quarterback	QB
Running back	RB	Safety	S	Tight end	TE	Wide receiver	WR

=== Recruits ===
College recruiting information
Name	Hometown	School	Height	Weight	40^{‡}	Commit date
Keegan Arnyek; DB	Moose Jaw, Saskatchewan	Vanier Collegiate Institute	N/A	N/A	--	May 3, 2012
Keegan Arnyek; DB	Recruit ratings: No ratings found					
Deon Bain; WR	Abbotsford, British Columbia	W. J. Mouat Secondary School	N/A	N/A	--	May 3, 2012
Deon Bain; WR	Recruit ratings: No ratings found					
Drew Bexson; RB	Lloydminster, Alberta	Holy Rosary High School	N/A	N/A	--	May 3, 2012
Drew Bexson; RB	Recruit ratings: No ratings found					
Matt Bonaca; QB	Sherwood Park, Alberta	Salisbury Composite High School	N/A	N/A	--	May 3, 2012
Matt Bonaca; QB	Recruit ratings: No ratings found					
Ryan Breadner; OL	Cherokee, Texas	Cherokee School	N/A	N/A	--	May 3, 2012
Ryan Breadner; OL	Recruit ratings: No ratings found					
Lane Bryska; OL	Saskatoon, Saskatchewan	Saskatoon Hilltops	N/A	N/A	--	May 3, 2012
Lane Bryska; OL	Recruit ratings: No ratings found					
Kris Charuk; LB	Regina, Saskatchewan	Balfour Collegiate	N/A	N/A	--	May 3, 2012
Kris Charuk; LB	Recruit ratings: No ratings found					
Michael Desjarlais; LB	Regina, Saskatchewan	Miller Comprehensive High School	N/A	N/A	--	May 3, 2012
Michael Desjarlais; LB	Recruit ratings: No ratings found					
Drew Digout; OL	Saskatoon, Saskatchewan	Aden Bowman Collegiate/Okanagan Sun	N/A	N/A	--	May 3, 2012
Drew Digout; OL	Recruit ratings: No ratings found					
Caleb Eidsvik; DL	Lloydminster, Alberta	Lloydminster Comprehensive High School	N/A	N/A	--	May 3, 2012
Caleb Eidsvik; DL	Recruit ratings: No ratings found					
Brendan Ernst; DB	Saskatoon, Saskatchewan	Evan Hardy Collegiate	N/A	N/A	--	May 3, 2012
Brendan Ernst; DB	Recruit ratings: No ratings found					
Jarvis James; RB	Calgary, Alberta	Bishop O'Byrne High School	N/A	N/A	--	May 3, 2012
Jarvis James; RB	Recruit ratings: No ratings found					
Evan Johnson; OL	Regina, Saskatchewan	Campbell Collegiate	N/A	N/A	--	May 3, 2012
Evan Johnson; OL	Recruit ratings: No ratings found					
Braxton Lawrence; DB	Saskatoon, Saskatchewan	Saskatoon Hilltops	N/A	N/A	--	May 3, 2012
Braxton Lawrence; DB	Recruit ratings: No ratings found					
Devin Logan; RB	Abbotsford, British Columbia	W. J. Mouat Secondary School	N/A	N/A	--	May 3, 2012
Devin Logan; RB	Recruit ratings: No ratings found					
Brydon Ozmun; WR	Nipawin, Saskatchewan	L. P. Miller Comprehensive High School	N/A	N/A	--	May 3, 2012
Brydon Ozmun; WR	Recruit ratings: No ratings found					
Evan Rutherford; OL	Edmonton, Alberta	Harry Ainlay Composite High School	N/A	N/A	--	May 3, 2012
Evan Rutherford; OL	Recruit ratings: No ratings found					
Brandon Stewart; RB	Sherwood Park, Alberta	Salisbury Composite High School	N/A	N/A	--	May 3, 2012
Brandon Stewart; RB	Recruit ratings: No ratings found					
Brandon Twarynski; DL	Calgary, Alberta	Bishop O'Byrne High School	N/A	N/A	--	May 3, 2012
Brandon Twarynski; DL	Recruit ratings: No ratings found					
Kurtis Wegren; OL	Swift Current, Saskatchewan	Swift Current Comprehensive High School	N/A	N/A	--	May 3, 2012
Kurtis Wegren; OL	Recruit ratings: No ratings found					
Overall recruit ranking:
Note: In many cases, Scout, Rivals, 247Sports, On3, and ESPN may conflict in their listings of height and weight.; In these cases, the average was taken. ESPN grades are on a 100-point scale.; Sources: "2012 Team Ranking". Rivals.com.

== Rankings ==
	Pre	Wk 1	Wk 2	Wk 3	Wk 4	Wk 5	Wk 6	Wk 7	Wk 8	Final
CIS Football Top 10	8	8	9	7	10	RV		RV	RV	RV

RV - Received Votes

== Preseason ==
Date	Time	Opponent	Site	Result	Attendance
08/24/2012	7:00 pm	Guelph Gryphons*	Griffiths Stadium; Saskatoon, SK (National Non-Conference Game)	L 26-21	3,322
*Non-conference game; All times are in Central time

== Regular season ==
The 2012 schedule is as follows:

Date	Time	Opponent	Rank	Site	TV	Result	Attendance
08/31/2012	7:00 pm	Alberta Golden Bears	No. 8	Griffiths Stadium; Saskatoon, SK (2012 Home Opener/Support Our Troops Game)		W 32-0	5,081
09/08/2012	12:00 pm	No. 10 Manitoba Bisons	No. 8	University Stadium; Winnipeg, MB		L 31-28	1,150
09/15/2012	3:00 pm	UBC Thunderbirds	No. 9	Thunderbird Stadium; Vancouver, BC (UBC's Homecoming Game)	Shaw TV	W 39-34	2,647
09/21/2012	7:00 pm	No. 9 Regina Rams	No. 7	Griffiths Stadium; Saskatoon, SK (Saskatchewan Sports Hall of Fame Game/Homecoming Game)	Shaw TV	L 35-26	9,033
09/29/2012	5:00 pm	No. 2 Calgary Dinos	No. 10	McMahon Stadium; Calgary, AB	Shaw TV	L 45-4	2,089
10/12/2012	7:00 pm	No. 8 Manitoba Bisons		Griffiths Stadium; Saskatoon, SK (Blackout Game)		W 44-39	4,575
10/20/2012	1:00 pm	Alberta Golden Bears		Foote Field; Edmonton, AB		W 27-10	436
10/26/2012	7:00 pm	UBC Thunderbirds		Griffiths Stadium; Saskatoon, SK	Shaw TV	W 52-24	3,340
Rankings from CIS Football Top 10 Poll released prior to the game; All times are in Central time

== Playoffs ==
Date	Time	Opponent	Site	TV	Result
11/02/2012	7:00 pm	No. 7 Regina Rams	Mosaic Stadium at Taylor Field; Regina, SK (Canada West Semi-Final)	Shaw TV	L 31-9
Rankings from CIS Football Top 10 Poll released prior to the game; All times are in Central time

== Radio ==
All Huskies football games were carried on CK750. The radio announcers were Branden Crowe and Kelly Bowers.

== Roster ==
Saskatchewan Huskies roster
Quarterbacks: 11 Chase Bradshaw First Year; 12 Matt Bonaca First Year; 2 Drew Burko Second Year; Running backs: 30 Jeremy Andrew Second Year; 39 Drew Bexson First Year; 28 Shane Buchanan Second Year; 3 Ben Coakwell Fifth Year; 31 Brad Grywal First Year; 22 Jarvis James First Year; 7 Dexter Janke Second Year; 23 Devin Logan First Year; 34 Travoy Martinez First Year; 5 Kent Rempel Second Year; 27 Brandon Stewart First Year; 37 Philippe Thibodeau First Year; Wide receivers: 25 Steve Boryski First Year; 17 Cody Buziak First Year; 21 Garrett Burgess Third Year; 29 Thomas Chan Second Year; 20 Peter Flahive First Year; 1 Jahlani Gilbert-Knorren Third Year; 70 Christian Gottenbos Second Year; 8 Kit Hillis Second Year; 71 Liam Howe First Year; 25 Josh Huschi Second Year; 24 James Jackins Second Year; 3 Dan Laventure First Year; 12 Julian Lynch First Year; 81 Brydon Ozmun First Year; 35 Charlie Power Third Year; 11 Sean Stenger Second Year; 9 Mitch Stevens Fourth Year; 4 Emmett Timms Second Year; Slotbacks: 19 Braeden George Fifth Year; 78 Jeffrey Moore Fourth Year	Offensive linemen: 66 Jordan Arkko Second Year; 61 Ryan Breadner First Year; 63 Lane Bryska First Year; 56 Josh Butcher Second Year; 42 Matt Czerniak Third Year; 45 Drew Digout First Year; 64 Michael Fuller Fourth Year; 62 Evan Greff Second Year; 51 Evan Johnson First Year; 55 Brad Nehring Third Year; 47 Cam Redl Fourth Year; 68 Clinton Reeder Second Year; 65 Evan Rutherford First Year; 48 Tyler Sandif First Year; 59 Brennan Stephen First Year; 54 Kurtis Wegren First Year; 46 Craig Woloshyn Fourth Year; Defensive linemen: 59 Alex Burko Second Year; 68 Caleb Eidsvik First Year; 44 Zach Hart Fourth Year DT; 55 Glenn Joorisity Second Year; 66 Luke Marshall First Year; 61 Lucas McPhee First Year; 64 Graham Peterson First Year; 60 Mark Roesler Fifth Year; 56 David Rybinski Fifth Year DT; 42 Ben Rush Fourth Year; 77 Joel Seutter Fourth Year; 51 Levi Steinhauer Fourth Year DE; 63 Brayden Twarynski First Year; 65 Dylan Wright Second Year	Linebackers: 4 Dane Bishop Third Year; 54 Jason Briggs Second Year; 30 Kris Charuk First Year; 37 Mike Desjarlais First Year; 47 Corbin Eskelson First Year; 39 Jacques Geyer Second Year; 45 Thomas Hilderman Third Year; 48 Jordan Hilgers Second Year; 21 John Malcolm Second Year; 29 Ronald Mwamba Second Year; 35 Cody Swanson First Year; 34 Richard Zacharias First Year; Defensive backs: 23 Andrew Abbs Third Year; 19 Justin Anderson First Year; 16 Keegan Arnyek First Year; 15 Cory Edington Second Year; 6 Brendan Ernst First Year; 24 Mitch Friesen Fifth Year; 18 Geoff Hughes Second Year; 8 Spencer Krieger Second Year; 17 Braxton Lawrence First Year; 27 Bryce McCall Fifth Year; 22 Seamus Neary Fourth Year; 26 David Craig Penner Second Year; 9 Braden Richards Second Year; 11 Tyler Robson Fourth Year; 28 Derek Sadownick Second Year; 2 Mark Smith First Year; 5 Luke Thiel Fourth Year; 7 Joey Todd First Year; Special teams: 32 Denton Kolodzinski Third Year P/K; 15 Cole Samson Second Year P/K; Roster updated 2012-08-13

== Game Notes ==
=== Vs. Guelph ===
Guelph at Saskatchewan

Team	1	2	3	4	Total
• Gryphons	7	7	8	4	26
Huskies	11	4	0	6	21

- Date: August 24
- Location: Griffiths Stadium
  Saskatoon, SK
- Game start: 7:00 PM CST
- Elapsed time: 3:15
- Game attendance: 3,322
- Game weather: 15°C, Wind: 35 km/h
- Referee: Rob Dumonceaux

=== Vs. Alberta ===
Alberta at Saskatchewan

Team	1	2	3	4	Total
Golden Bears	0	0	0	0	0
• Huskies	12	17	0	3	32

- Date: August 31
- Location: Griffiths Stadium
  Saskatoon, SK
- Game start: 7:00 PM CST
- Elapsed time: 3:00
- Game attendance: 5,081
- Game weather: 26°C, Wind: 26 km/h E
- Referee: Bob Dumonceaux

=== At Manitoba ===
Saskatchewan at Manitoba

Team	1	2	3	4	Total
Huskies	14	0	1	13	28
• Bisons	0	7	18	6	31

- Date: September 8
- Location: University Stadium
  Winnipeg, MB
- Game start: 12:00 PM CST
- Elapsed time: 3:00
- Game attendance: 1,150
- Game weather: 17°C, Wind: 50 km/h NNW
- Referee: Ardis Oldksyn

=== At UBC ===
Saskatchewan at UBC

Team	1	2	3	4	Total
• Huskies	7	14	1	17	39
Thunderbirds	3	17	4	10	34

- Date: September 15
- Location: Thunderbird Stadium
  Vancouver, BC
- Game start: 2:00 PM PST
- Elapsed time: 2:52
- Game attendance: 2,647
- Game weather: Sunny
- TV announcers (Shaw TV): Jim Mullin (Play by play), Laurence Nixon (Colour)

=== Vs. Regina ===
Regina at Saskatchewan

Team	1	2	3	4	Total
• Rams	7	7	21	0	35
Huskies	8	4	0	14	26

- Date: September 21
- Location: Griffiths Stadium
  Saskatoon, SK
- Game start: 7:00 PM CST
- Elapsed time: 3:13
- Game attendance: 9,033
- Game weather: 13°C, Wind: 15 km/h, Clear skies
- Referee: Mike Thorson
- TV announcers (Shaw TV): Jim Mullin (Play by play)

=== At Calgary ===
Saskatchewan at Calgary

Team	1	2	3	4	Total
Huskies	3	1	0	0	4
• Dinos	12	21	11	1	45

- Date: September 29
- Location: McMahon Stadium
  Calgary, AB
- Game start: 5:00 PM CST
- Elapsed time: 2:41
- Game attendance: 2,089
- Referee: J. Popplestone
- TV announcers (Shaw TV): Jim Mullin (Play by play)

=== Vs. Manitoba ===
Manitoba at Saskatchewan

Team	1	2	3	4	Total
Bisons	7	8	14	10	39
• Huskies	4	10	2	28	44

- Date: October 12
- Location: Griffiths Stadium
  Saskatoon, SK
- Game start: 7:00 PM CST
- Elapsed time: 3:30
- Game attendance: 4,575
- Game weather: 5°C, Wind: 22 km/h, Cloudy
- Referee: Mike Thorson

=== At Alberta ===
Saskatchewan at Alberta

Team	1	2	3	4	Total
• Huskies	3	14	3	7	27
Golden Bears	3	7	0	0	10

- Date: October 20
- Location: Foote Field
  Edmonton, AB
- Game start: 1:00 PM CST
- Elapsed time: 2:46
- Game attendance: 436
- Game weather: 1°C, Wind NW 29 km/h, Overcast
- Referee: Kelly Edgeworth

=== Vs. UBC ===
UBC at Saskatchewan

Team	1	2	3	4	Total
Thunderbirds	3	7	0	14	24
• Huskies	10	21	7	14	52

- Date: October 26
- Location: Griffiths Stadium
  Saskatoon, SK
- Game start: 7:00 PM CST
- Elapsed time: 2:50
- Game attendance: 3,340
- Game weather: −5 °C, Wind 17 km/h, Partly Cloudy
- Referee: Bob Dumonceaux
- TV announcers (Shaw TV): Jim Mullin (Play by Play)

=== At Regina ===
Saskatchewan at Regina

Team	1	2	3	4	Total
Huskies	0	9	0	0	9
• Rams	0	10	14	7	31

- Date: November 2
- Location: Mosaic Stadium at Taylor Field
  Regina, SK
- Game start: 7:00 PM CST
- TV announcers (Shaw TV): Jim Mullin (Play by Play), Daved Benefield (Colour), Dave Thomas and Andy Neal (Sideline)

== Awards ==
Regular Season
Date	Player	Award
September 5, 2012	Travoy Martinez	Canada West Defensive Player of the Week; CIS Defensive Player of the Week
September 17, 2012	Kit Hillis	Canada West Offensive Player of the Week
October 31, 2012	Mitch Friesen	Canada West Defensive Player of the Week; CIS Defensive Player of the Week

== See also ==
- 2012 CIS football season
