= Mickey Donovan =

American gridiron football player and coach (born 1980)

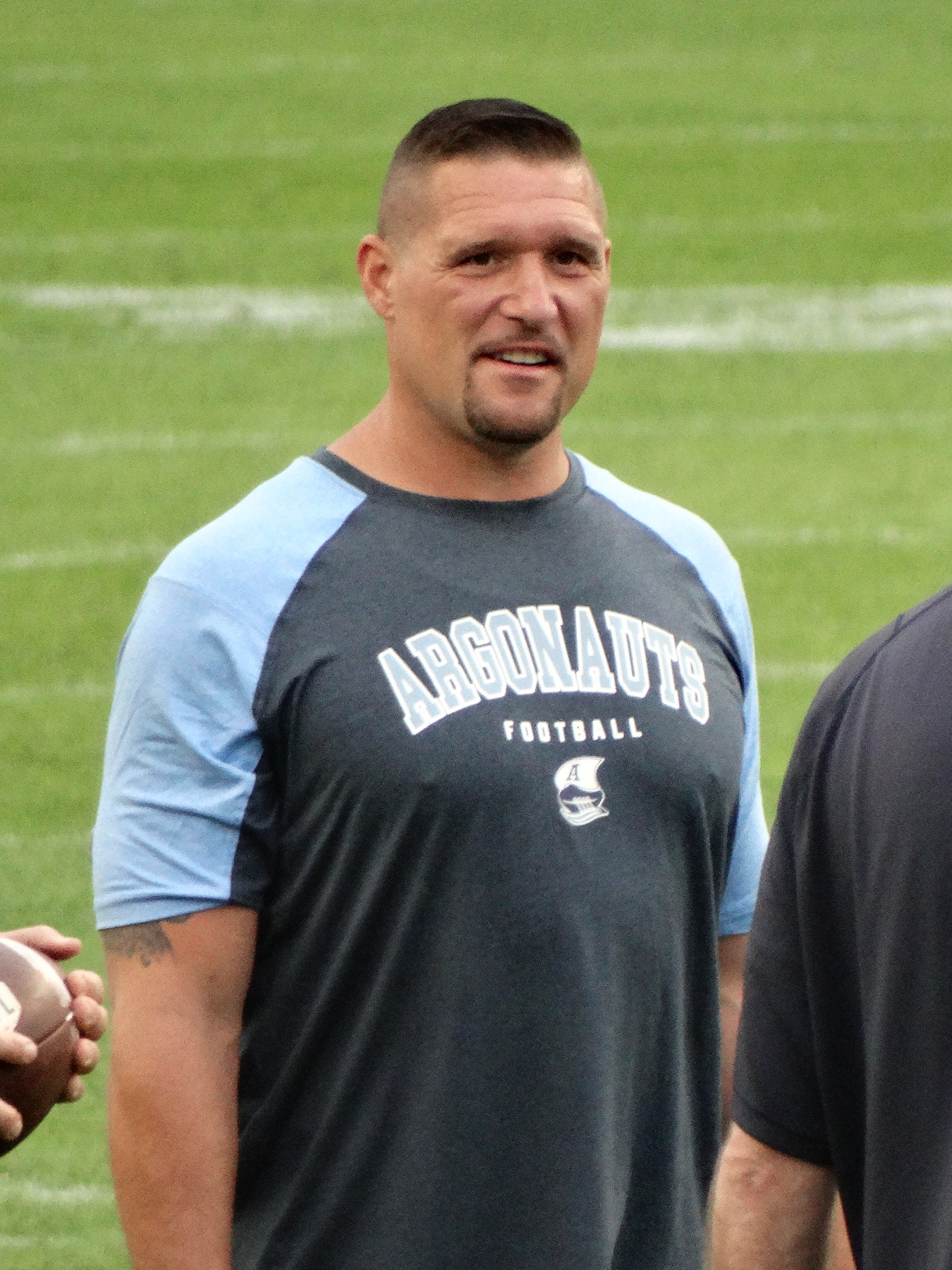
- Donovan with the Toronto Argonauts in 2024

Toronto Argonauts
- Title: Special teams coordinator

Personal information
- Born: 1980 (age 45–46); Laconia, New Hampshire, U.S.
- Listed height: 6 ft 0 in (1.83 m)
- Listed weight: 230 lb (104 kg)

Career information
- Position: Linebacker
- College: Maine
- University: Concordia

Career history

Playing
- 2005: Hamilton Tiger-Cats*
- 2006: Hamilton Tiger-Cats*
- * Offseason or practice squad member only

Coaching
- 2006: New Hampshire Wildcats (Coaching intern)
- 2007–2011: Western Mustangs (Linebackers coach, Special teams coach, Recruiting coordinator)
- 2012–2013: McGill Redmen (Defensive coordinator, Assistant head coach)
- 2014–2017: Concordia Stingers (Head coach)
- 2018–2021: Montreal Alouettes (Special teams coordinator)
- 2021: Montreal Alouettes (Linebackers coach)
- 2022–present: Toronto Argonauts (Special teams coordinator)

Awards and highlights
- 2× Grey Cup champion (2022, 2024); Presidents' Trophy (2004); RSEQ Coach of the Year (2014); 2× First-team All-Canadian (2003, 2004)

Mickey Donovan is a professional Canadian football coach who is currently the special teams coordinator for the Toronto Argonauts of the Canadian Football League (CFL). He is a two-time Grey Cup champion after winning with the Argonauts in 2022 and 2024.

== College career ==
Donovan played college football for two years for the Maine Black Bears where he had 27 tackles and 4.5 sacks in 10 games played. He then transferred to Concordia University to play for the Stingers from 2002 to 2004. He was named a First-team All-Canadian in 2003 and 2004 and also won the Presidents' Trophy in 2004 as the top defensive player in CIS football.

== Professional career ==
After attending a free agent tryout, Donovan signed as a free agent with the Hamilton Tiger-Cats on May 18, 2005, to a two-year plus an option contract. He played in the Touchdown Atlantic preseason game, but was released on June 13, 2005. It was announced on February 22, 2006, that he had re-signed with the Tiger-Cats, but he was again released after the second pre-season game on June 3, 2006. Donovan had suffered a knee injury in 2006 which had ended his playing career.

== Coaching career ==
Donovan began his coaching career as an intern with the New Hampshire Wildcats in 2006. He was then hired by former Tiger-Cats head coach, Greg Marshall, to become the linebackers coach for the Western Mustangs in 2007. Over his four years with the Mustangs, he also coached the special teams units and was the team's recruiting coordinator.

On November 18, 2011, it was announced that Donovan had been hired as the assistant head coach and defensive coordinator for the McGill Redmen. He spent two years with McGill, but the team was unable to qualify for the playoffs during that time.

He returned to his alma mater on February 11, 2014 as he was announced as the new head coach for the Concordia Stingers and was the fifth in the program's history. In his first season, the Stingers finished with a 5–3 record and returned to the playoffs for the first time since 2011. Donovan was subsequently named the RSEQ Coach of the Year. The Stingers qualified for the playoffs in each of the next three seasons, but were defeated in the semi-finals in all four years. After four seasons and a 16–15 regular season record, Donovan resigned as head coach of the Stingers after the 2017 season.

On January 3, 2018, it was announced that Donovan had been hired as the special teams coordinator for the Montreal Alouettes. He added the title of linebackers coach for the 2021 season. However, Donovan was not retained following the 2021 season.

It was announced on January 19, 2022, that Donovan had joined the Toronto Argonauts as their special teams coordinator.
