= 36th Vanier Cup =

2000 Canadian university football championship

Ottawa Gee-Gees	Regina Rams
(7–1)	(4–4)
42	39
Head coach: Marcel Bellefeuille	Head coach: Frank McCrystal
	1	2	3	4	Total
Ottawa Gee-Gees	14	21	0	7	42
Regina Rams	0	10	7	22	39
- Date: December 2, 2000
- Stadium: SkyDome
- Location: Toronto
- Ted Morris Memorial Trophy: Phill Côté, Ottawa
- Bruce Coulter Award: Scott Gordon, Ottawa
- Attendance: 18,209

Broadcasters
- Network: TSN(English)/ RDS (French)

The 36th Vanier Cup was played on December 2, 2000, at the SkyDome in Toronto, Ontario, and decided the CIAU football champion for the 2000 season. The Ottawa Gee-Gees won their second championship in school history by defeating the Regina Rams by a score of 42-39.

== Game summary ==
Ottawa Gee-Gees (42) - TDs, Côté (2), Shaver, Ajram, DiBattista (2); cons., Lee-Yaw (6).

Regina Rams (39) - TDs, Leason (2), Clermont, Hughes, Warnecke; FGs Ryan; cons., Ryan (3), Olynick.

=== Scoring summary ===
First Quarter
OTT - TD Côté 4 run (Lee-Yaw convert) (7:18)
OTT - TD Côté 3 run (Lee-Yaw convert) (10:44)

Second Quarter
REG - TD Leason 1 run (Ryan convert) (1:29)
OTT - TD Shaver 27 pass from Côté (Lee-Yaw convert) (3:50)
REG - FG Ryan 25 (7:46)
OTT - TD Arjam 15 run (Lee-Yaw convert) (9:57)
OTT - TD DiBattista 9 pass from Côté (Lee-Yaw convert) (14:57)

Third Quarter
REG - TD Leason 1 run (Ryan convert) (7:14)

Fourth Quarter
REG - TD Clermont 16 pass from Leason (Ryan convert) (0:30)
OTT - TD DiBattista 27 pass from Côté (Lee-Yaw convert) (4:21)
REG - TD Hughes 3 run (Ryan convert) (8:02)
REG - TD Warnecke 25 pass from Leason (two-point convert Olynick 5 pass from Leason) (15:00)
