= Don Bahnuik =

Canadian football player

No. 60
- Position: Defensive tackle

Personal information
- Born: August 18, 1944 (age 82); Canora, Saskatchewan
- Listed height: 6 ft 2 in (1.88 m)
- Listed weight: 245 lb (111 kg)

Career information
- MSJFL: Regina Rams

Career history
- 1966–1974: Saskatchewan Roughriders

Awards and highlights
- Grey Cup champion (1966)

Don Bahnuik (born August 18, 1944) is a Canadian former professional football player. He played defensive tackle for the Saskatchewan Roughriders of the Canadian Football League from 1966 to 1974. He was part of the 1966 Grey Cup championship team.

Bahnuik played three years for the Regina Rams of the Man-Sask Junior Football League and was an offensive and defensive all-star. In 1964 he was named the Rams' Most Valuable Player.
