= Jeff Cummins =

American gridiron football player and coach (born 1969)

Acadia Axemen
- Title: Head coach

Personal information
- Born: May 25, 1969 (age 57); San Pedro, California, U.S.
- Listed height: 6 ft 6 in (1.98 m)
- Listed weight: 270 lb (122 kg)

Career information
- Position: Defensive lineman (No. 99)
- College: Oregon

Career history

Playing
- 1994: Las Vegas Posse
- 1995: Toronto Argonauts
- 1996: Ottawa Rough Riders
- 1998–2000: Hamilton Tiger-Cats
- 2001: Toronto Phantoms
- 2002: Arizona Rattlers
- 2003: Georgia Force

Coaching
- 2004–present: Acadia Axemen (HC)

Awards and highlights
- 2× Frank Tindall Trophy (2011, 2017); Grey Cup champion (1999); Second-team All-Pac-10 (1992)

Jeff Cummins (born May 25, 1969) is an American former professional football defensive lineman. He is the head coach for Acadia University's football team, the Acadia Axemen. Cummins became Acadia's head coach in 2003 and has led the team to first-place finishes in 2005, 2006, 2011, 2012, 2017, and 2019.

== Professional football ==
From 1994–2000, Cummins played in the Canadian Football League for the Las Vegas Posse, Toronto Argonauts, Ottawa Rough Riders, and the Hamilton Tiger-Cats. From 2001–2003, he played in the Arena Football League with the Toronto Phantoms, Arizona Rattlers, and the Georgia Force. He was famous for his flamboyant sack dances, which he usually deployed after sacking the opposing team's quarterback.

== College football ==
From 1990–1992, Cummins played college football for the Oregon Ducks. From 1988–1989, Cummins played junior college football for El Camino College and was a 1st Team All American as a defensive end and was voted onto the 1980s Jr College All-Decade team.

== Head coaching record ==
Year	Team	Overall	Regular	Standing	Bowl/playoffs
Acadia Axemen (AUS) (2004–Present)
2004	Acadia	6–4	5–3	2nd	L Loney
2005	Acadia	6–4	5–3	1st	W Loney, L Uteck
2006	Acadia	7–4	5–3	1st	W Loney, L Uteck
2007	Acadia	3–6	3–5	3rd	
2008	Acadia	1–7	1–7	4th	
2009	Acadia	2–7	2–6	3rd	
2010	Acadia	5–5	4–4	2nd	L Loney
2011	Acadia	8–2	7–1	1st	W Loney, L Uteck
2012	Acadia	8–2	7–1	1st	W Loney, L Uteck
2013	Acadia	3–6	3–5	3rd	
2014	Acadia	3–6	3–5	3rd	
2015	Acadia	4–5	4–4	3rd	
2016	Acadia	2–7	2–6	3rd	
2017	Acadia	7–3	6–2	1st	W Loney, L Uteck
2018	Acadia	5–4	5–3	3rd	
2019	Acadia	9–1	8–0	1st	W Loney, L Uteck
2020	Season cancelled due to COVID-19 pandemic				
2021	Acadia	1–6	1–5	4th	
2022	Acadia	0–8	0–8	5th	
2023	Acadia	1–7	1–7	5th	
2024	Acadia	2–7	2–6	4th	
2025	Acadia	2–7	2–6	4th	
Acadia:		85–108	76–90		
Total:		85–108			
