= Marcel Bellefeuille =

Canadian gridiron football coach

- Bellefeuille with the Ottawa Gee-Gees in 2026

Ottawa Gee-Gees
- Title: Head coach

Personal information
- Born: March 19, 1966 (age 60); Ottawa, Ontario, Canada

Career information
- University: Ottawa

Career history

Coaching
- 1995–1997: Ottawa Gee-Gees (Assistant)
- 1998–2000: Ottawa Gee-Gees (HC)
- 2001–2002: Saskatchewan Roughriders (RBs/WRs)
- 2003–2005: Saskatchewan Roughriders (OC)
- 2006: Montreal Alouettes (RBs/WRs)
- 2007: Montreal Alouettes (OC)
- 2008: Hamilton Tiger-Cats (OC)
- 2008–2011: Hamilton Tiger-Cats (HC)
- 2012: Omaha Nighthawks (OC/WRs)
- 2013–2015: Winnipeg Blue Bombers (OC)
- 2016–2017: BC Lions (WR)
- 2018: Queen's Gaels (OC)
- 2020: Montreal Alouettes (OLC)*
- 2020–present: Ottawa Gee-Gees (HC)
- 2022–2023: Philadelphia Stars (WR)
- 2024–2025: Michigan Panthers (OC)

Operations
- 2019: Edmonton Eskimos (Scout)

Awards and highlights
- 2000 Vanier Cup winner; 1999 OQIFC Coach of the Year

Marcel Bellefeuille (born March 19, 1966) is a Canadian football coach who is the head coach of the University of Ottawa Gee-Gees and offensive coordinator for the Michigan Panthers. He originally began his coaching career with Ottawa in 1995 and won the program's second Vanier Cup championship in 2000. He then spent 16 years coaching in the Canadian Football League (CFL), including a stint as the head coach of the Hamilton Tiger-Cats from 2008 to 2011. Bellefeuille returned as head coach of the Gee-Gees in 2020.

== Coaching career ==
=== Ottawa Gee-Gees ===
Bellefeuille was hired by the Ottawa Gee-Gees as their assistant head-coach in 1995. He spent the next three seasons at the same position before being promoted to head coach in 1998. In 1999, he was named OQIFC Coach of the Year and then, in 2000, he led the Gee-Gees to a Vanier Cup victory.

=== Saskatchewan Roughriders ===
After the win in the Vanier Cup, Bellefeuille was hired by the Saskatchewan Roughriders as an assistant. In 2003, he was named the offensive coordinator. In three seasons, he helped the Roughriders running backs total 7,000 rushing yards.

=== Montreal Alouettes ===
After leaving Saskatchewan, Bellefeuille joined the Montreal Alouettes in 2006 as their running backs and wide receivers coach. In 2007, he was promoted to offensive coordinator and running backs coach. In his 1st season in Montreal, he helped Robert Edwards lead the CFL in touchdowns with 17. Bellefeuille also helped the Alouettes be the only team with two 1,000 yard receivers in Kerry Watkins and Ben Cahoon.

=== Hamilton Tiger-Cats ===
In 2008, Bellefeuille was hired by the Hamilton Tiger-Cats to be their offensive coordinator and Quarterbacks coach. In September 2008, following Charlie Taaffe's firing, he was named the interim head coach. On October 27, he was officially named Taaffe's replacement. His record as the Ti-Cats interim coach was 1-7-0. On January 15, 2009, Bellefeuille completed his staff shake-up by hiring Greg Marshall as his defensive coordinator and Mike Gibson as his offensive coordinator. Before the Tiger-Cats final 2009 preseason game against the Toronto Argonauts, Bellefeuille said that, "The only thing we know for certain as a coaching staff and as an organization is that Nick Setta will be our kicker." In three full seasons as the head coach of the Ti-Cats, Bellefeuille posted a 26-28 record, making the playoffs every season and going to the East Final in 2011. While the team had made an East Final appearance, they had a losing record in 2011 and he was relieved of his duties after season's end.

=== Omaha Nighthawks ===
Prior to the 2012 UFL season, Bellefeuille was announced as offensive coordinator and wide receivers coach for the United Football League's Omaha Nighthawks. Like Bellefeuille, Omaha head coach Bart Andrus was also a former CFL head coach, having coached the Toronto Argonauts in 2009.

=== Winnipeg Blue Bombers ===
On August 12, 2013, Bellefeuille signed on with the Winnipeg Blue Bombers of the CFL as a member of the team's offensive coaching staff. Six days later, he was promoted to offensive coordinator following the dismissal of Gary Crowton and remained with the team through to the 2015 season.

=== BC Lions ===
Bellefeuille joined the BC Lions for the 2016 season and spent two years with the club.

=== Queen's Gaels ===
In 2018, Bellefeuille served as offensive coordinator for the Queen's Gaels football team of U Sports.

=== Edmonton Eskimos ===
Bellefeuille was hired as a scout for the Edmonton Eskimos in 2019.

=== Montreal Alouettes ===
On January 9, 2020, it was announced that Bellefeuille had re-joined the Montreal Alouettes as the team's offensive line coach. However, following the resignation of Jamie Barresi at the University of Ottawa, there was speculation that Bellefueille could return as the program's head coach there.

=== Ottawa Gee-Gees (II) ===
On May 21, 2020, Bellefeuille was officially announced as the head coach of the Ottawa Gee-Gees.

=== Philadelphia Stars ===
On January 28, 2022, Stars Head coach Bart Andrus announced that Bellefueille would be a part of the Stars coaching staff at an unknown position, presumably offensive coordinator. On January 1, 2024, it was announced the Stars would not be a part of the UFL Merger.

=== Michigan Panthers ===
On January 29, 2024, it was revealed that Bellefueille would become the new Offensive coordinator for the Michigan Panthers.

== CFL coaching record ==
Team	Year	Regular season					Postseason		
Team	Year	Won	Lost	Ties	Win %	Finish	Won	Lost	Result
HAM	2008	1	7	0	.125	4th in East Division	–	–	Missed playoffs
HAM	2009	9	9	0	.500	2nd in East Division	0	1	Lost East Semi-Final
HAM	2010	9	9	0	.500	2nd in East Division	0	1	Lost East Semi-Final
HAM	2011	8	10	0	.444	3rd in East Division	1	1	Lost East Final
Total		27	35	0	.435	0 East Division; Championships	1	3	0 Grey Cups

== Personal ==
Bellefeuille was born in Ottawa, attended Ridgemont High School, and played both running back and defensive back with the Ottawa Gee-Gees. He lives with his wife Julie and their four children (Ymilie Bellefeuille, Alexandra Bellefeuille, Mathias Bellefeuille and Cedric Bellefeuille).
