= Gary Waterman =

Canadian gridiron football coach

St. Francis Xavier X-Men
- Title: Head coach

Personal information
- Born: Mississauga, Ontario

Career information
- University: St. Francis Xavier

Career history
- 2006–2008: St. Francis Xavier X-Men (DC)
- 2009–present: St. Francis Xavier X-Men (HC)

Awards and highlights
- 6× Loney Bowl champion (2015, 2016, 2018, 2021, 2022, 2023); 6× AUS Coach of the Year (2015, 2016, 2018, 2021, 2022, 2023); U Sports Coach of the Year (2022)

Gary Waterman is the head coach for St. Francis Xavier University's football team, the St. Francis Xavier X-Men, a position he has held since the 2009 U Sports season. He is a six-time Loney Bowl Champion and six-time Atlantic University Sport Coach of the Year winner. In 2022, he was awarded the Frank Tindall Trophy as the U Sports Football Coach of the Year.

== Playing career ==
Waterman played CIAU football for the St. Francis Xavier X-Men from 1988 to 1992. He played as running back and defensive back during his collegiate career while being named an AUS All-Star three times, team MVP three times, and served as a team captain twice.

== Coaching career ==
After graduation, Waterman moved back to his hometown of Mississauga where he became a high school teacher for Father Michael Goetz Secondary School. While teaching there, he coached football, basketball, and track and field. He served as a guest coach in 2004 and 2005 for the St. Francis Xavier X-Men football team and was offered a role as the defensive coordinator in 2006. After serving as the team's defensive coordinator for three years, he was named the X-Men's head coach on January 16, 2009, and became the first St. Francis Xavier alumni to be named the team's head coach. While he had 6–2 record and Loney Bowl appearance in his first year in 2009, the team only qualified for the playoffs once in the next four years.

After a return to the playoffs in 2014, Waterman and the X-Men ended a 19-year drought by finishing the 2015 season as Loney Bowl champions in a 14–12 win over the Mount Allison Mounties. He was named the AUS Coach of the Year in 2015. In 2016, the X-Men ended another 19-year drought by finishing the regular season in first place for the first time since 1997, along with capturing their second consecutive AUS title. Waterman was again named the AUS Coach of the Year in 2016, although the team regressed to a third-place finish in 2017. In 2018, the team finished once again as Loney Bowl champions and Waterman won his third AUS Coach of the Year award. In 2019, the team finished in last place in the AUS standings and missed the playoffs for the first time since 2013. However, following the cancelled 2020 season, Waterman led the X-Men to an undefeated record as he won his fourth Loney Bowl title in 2021. The team repeated as champions in 2022 with Waterman winning his fifth Loney Bowl title and being named the U Sports Coach of the Year for the first time in his career.

== Personal life ==
Waterman currently resides in Antigonish, Nova Scotia with his wife, Andrea. They have four children and one grandchild.

== Head coaching record ==
Year	Overall	Regular	Standing	Bowl/playoffs
St. Francis Xavier X-Men (AUS) (2009-present)
2009	7-3	6-2	2nd	L Loney
2010	1-7	1-7	4th	
2011	2-7	2-6	3rd	
2012	2-6	2-6	4th	
2013	3-5	3-5	4th	
2014	5-5	4-4	2nd	L Loney
2015	7-4	5-3	2nd	W Loney, L Uteck
2016	8-2	7-1	1st	W Loney, L Mitchell
2017	4-5	4-4	3rd	
2018	8-3	6-2	2nd	W Loney, L Uteck
2019	2-6	2-6	5th	
2020	Season canceled due to COVID-19 pandemic			
2021	8-1	6-0	1st	W Loney, L Mitchell
2022	9-1	8-0	1st	W Loney, L Uteck
2023	10-1	8-0	1st	W Loney, L Mitchell
2024	5-4	5-3	2nd	
2025	6-4	5-3	2nd	L Loney
St. FX:	87-64	74-52		
Total:	87-64			
