= Jackson Sombach =

Canadian football player (born 2000)

Profile
- Position: Defensive back

Personal information
- Born: March 11, 2000 (age 26)
- Listed height: 5 ft 8 in (1.73 m)
- Listed weight: 194 lb (88 kg)

Career information
- High school: Miller (Regina, Saskatchewan)
- University: Regina (2018–2024)
- CFL draft: 2024: 7th round, 60th overall pick

Career history
- Calgary Stampeders (2024)*; Calgary Stampeders (2025–2026)
- * Offseason or practice squad member only

Awards and highlights
- Second-team All-Canadian (2024); 2× Canada West All-Star (2022, 2024)
- Stats at CFL.ca

Jackson Sombach (born March 11, 2000) is a Canadian professional football player who is a defensive back. He played U Sports football at Regina.

== Early life ==
Jackson Sombach was born on March 11, 2000. He played high school football at Miller Comprehensive High School in Regina, Saskatchewan. He played for Team Saskatchewan at the 2016 Football Canada Cup. In his Grade 12 year at Miller, he posted 23 tackles, one interception, two pass breakups, and one fumble recovery.

== University career ==
Sombach played U Sports football for the Regina Rams of the University of Regina. He played in one game in 2018, posting one solo tackle, before being redshirted. He played in three games, all starts, during the 2019 season. Two starts were at cornerback and one was at defensive halfback. Sombach recorded five solo tackles, two assisted tackles, and two pass breakups for the 2019 season. The 2020 season was cancelled due to the COVID-19 pandemic. He started all six games at halfback in 2021, totaling 16 solo tackles, five assisted tackles, one sack, one interception, six pass breakups, and one fumble recovery. He also recovered a blocked punt for a touchdown. In 2022, Sombach's brother Carson joined him on the team. Sombach started all eight games at halfback in 2022, recording 24 solo tackles, 13 assisted tackles, and three pass breakups, earning Canada West All-Star honors. In 2023, Jackson and Carson were joined by two more of their brothers, Connor and Rylar, on the Rams. Jackson started all eight games at halfback for the second straight year in 2023, recording 25 solo tackles, seven assisted tackles, one interception, and three pass breakups.

Sombach was invited to the CFL's Invitational Combine at the University of Waterloo in March 2024. He posted a 36-inch vertical leap, a 4.58-second 40-yard dash, and a 6.97-second 3-cone drill. He was the best performer in all three categories, earning him an invitation to the national CFL Combine in Winnipeg. He was selected by the Calgary Stampeders in the seventh round, with the 60th overall pick, of the 2025 CFL draft. He signed with the Stampeders on May 3, 2024. He played in two preseason games but was cut before the start of the 2024 CFL season.

Sombach then returned to Regina for his final season of U Sports eligibility. He played in 11 games during the 2024 season, recording 25 solo tackles, 13 assisted tackles, two interceptions, seven pass breakups, and one fumble recovery. He helped the Rams win the Hardy Cup and was named the team MVP. Sombach garnered second-team All-Canadian and Canada West All-Star recognition for his performance during the 2024 season. He was a kinesiology student at Regina.

== Professional career ==
Pre-draft measurables
Height	Weight	40-yard dash	20-yard shuttle	Three-cone drill	Vertical jump	Broad jump	Bench press
5 ft 8 1/8 in (1.73 m)	195 lb (88 kg)	4.61 s	4.28 s	7.02 s	35.5 in (0.90 m)	10 ft 2 1/8 in (3.10 m)	13 reps
All values from CFL Combine

Sombach re-signed with the Stampeders on November 27, 2024. He was placed on the one-game injured list on July 23, 2025, activated from the injured list on August 8, placed on the one-game injured list again on September 25, and activated from the injured list again on October 31, 2025. He dressed in eleven games overall during the 2025 season, posting four tackles on defense and one special teams tackle.

On October 26, 2026, Sombach was released by the Stampeders at the end of the season.
