= Noah Picton =

Canadian football coach (born 1995)

Regina Rams
- Title: Quarterbacks coach

Personal information
- Born: July 5, 1995 (age 31); Regina, Saskatchewan, Canada
- Listed height: 5 ft 8 in (1.73 m)
- Listed weight: 180 lb (82 kg)

Career information
- Position: Quarterback
- High school: Dr. Martin LeBoldus
- University: Regina
- CFL draft: 2018: undrafted

Career history

Playing
- 2018: Toronto Argonauts*
- 2019: Toronto Argonauts*
- * Offseason or practice squad member only

Coaching
- 2020–present: Regina Rams (Quarterbacks coach)

Awards and highlights
- Hec Crighton Trophy (2016); 2× First-team All-Canadian (2016, 2017); Most career passing yards in U Sports football (11,494)
- Stats at CFL.ca

Noah Picton (born July 5, 1995) is a Canadian football coach and former quarterback. He is currently the quarterbacks coach for the Regina Rams of U Sports football. He played college football for the Rams from 2014 to 2018 and is the all-time leading passer in U Sports history. He also won the Hec Crighton Trophy in 2016 and was named a first-team All-Canadian twice in his career.

== University career ==
Picton first joined the Regina Rams football program in 2013 where he dressed in one game while taking a redshirt season. During the 2014 season, he played in all eight regular season games and started in four of them as he split quarterbacking duties with Cayman Shutter. Despite only starting in four games, he set a conference record for a rookie by passing for 2,029 yards while completing 64.1% of his passes for 11 touchdowns and five interceptions. The Rams won their final two regular season games to qualify for the playoffs, but lost to the Calgary Dinos 59–0 as Picton completed 14 of 24 passes for 147 yards and two interceptions.

In 2015, Picton started in all eight regular season games, completing 166 of 252 pass attempts for 2,134 yards with 10 touchdown passes and eight interceptions. On October 30, 2015, against the Saskatchewan Huskies, he set a program single-game record for highest pass completion in a game by completing 78.8% of his passes. The Rams finished winless in 2015 and did not qualify for the playoffs.

The 2016 season marked a tremendous turnaround for the Rams, largely due to Picton's outstanding play. He set a U Sports single-season record with 3,186 passing yards (since surpassed by Adam Sinagra) and led all players that year with 25 touchdown passes with a 69.3% completion percentage. He also had the second-highest number of completions in U Sports history in a single season with 224. The Rams finished with a 6–2 record and in first place in Canada West for the first time in program history as Picton started all eight games. The season ended on a sour note as the Rams lost the West Semi-Final to the fourth-place UBC Thunderbirds. At the end of the season, he was named a First Team All-Canadian and was awarded the Hec Crighton Trophy, becoming the first Rams player to win the award.

In the following year, he again started in all eight games and completed 207 passes from 301 attempts for 2,491 yards with 19 touchdown passes and nine interceptions. In doing so, he became the Rams' all-time leader in completions and passing yards, surpassing former record-holder Teale Orban. He was named a First Team All-Canadian for the second season and led the Rams to a third-place finish with a 4–4 record. However, the Rams were again defeated by the Thunderbirds in the Canada West Semi-Final game.

After attending training camp with the Toronto Argonauts, Picton re-joined the Rams to complete his fifth and final year of U Sports eligibility in 2018. On September 29, 2018, Picton became the all-time leading passer in U Sports football, surpassing Sherbrooke's Jérémi Roch with 11,494 passing yards. He sat out the last three games of the 2018 season with a foot infection to finish his U Sports career with that same number. The Rams had to forfeit three wins due to use of an ineligible player and did not qualify for the playoffs in 2018.

== Professional career ==
Pre-draft measurables
Height	Weight	40-yard dash	20-yard shuttle	Three-cone drill	Vertical jump	Broad jump	Bench press
5 ft 8 3/4 in (1.75 m)	177 lb (80 kg)	4.84 s	4.40 s	7.33 s	30.5 in (0.77 m)	8 ft 9 1/2 in (2.68 m)	5 reps
All values from CFL Combine

Picton signed as an undrafted free agent with the Toronto Argonauts of the Canadian Football League (CFL) on May 14, 2018, but was released after training camp and returned to the Regina Rams. Following the conclusion of his record-setting 2018 U Sports season, Picton re-signed with the Argonauts on December 16, 2018, to a three-year contract. He played in one pre-season game for the Argonauts on May 30, 2019, and attempted one pass. He was released on June 1, 2019.

== Coaching career ==
On December 11, 2019, it was announced that Picton had joined the Regina Rams as the team's quarterbacks coach for the 2020 season.
