= André Bolduc =

Canadian gridiron football player and coach (born 1971)

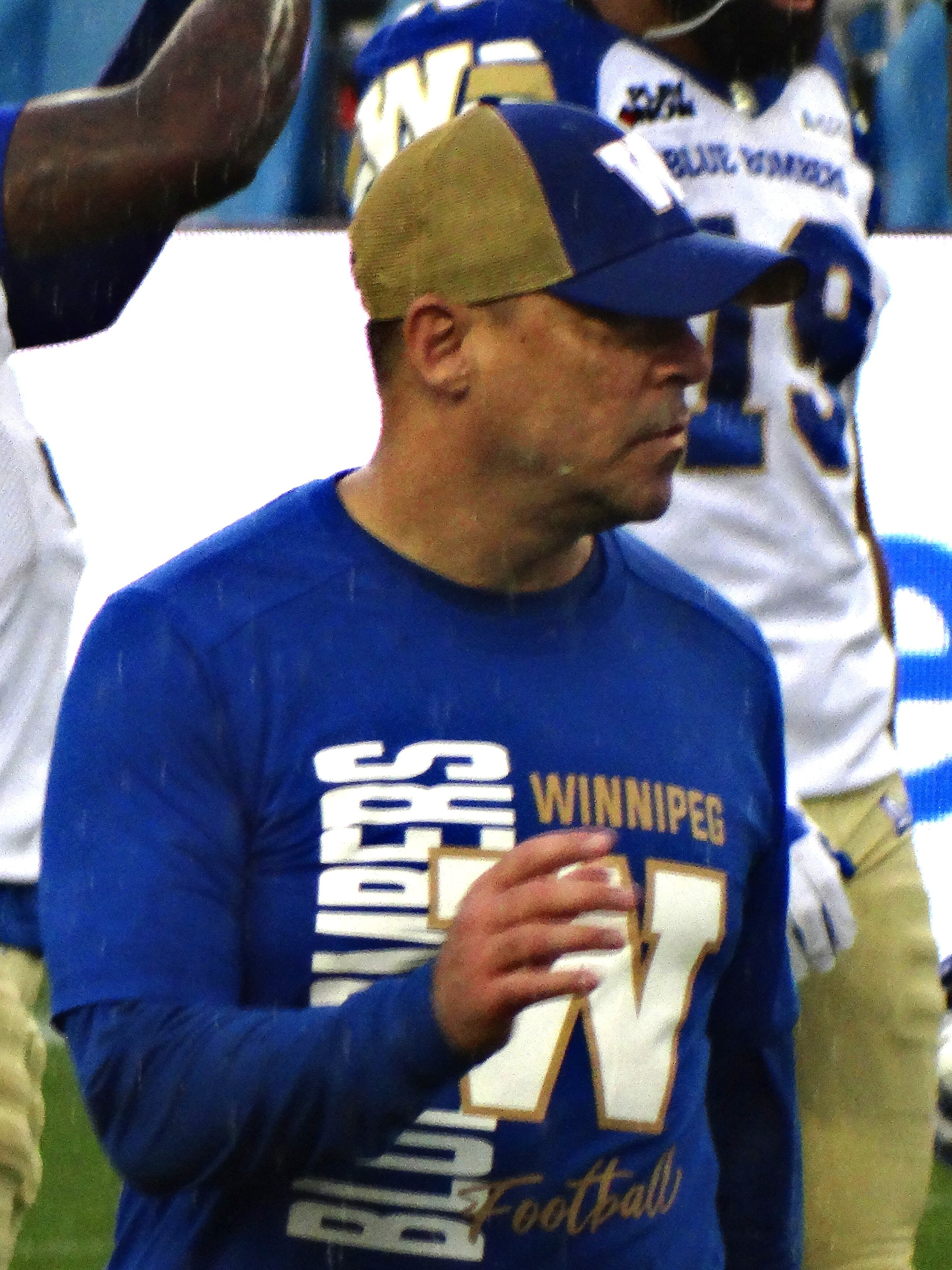
- Bolduc with the Winnipeg Blue Bombers in 2025

Winnipeg Blue Bombers
- Title: Running backs coach

Personal information
- Born: March 25, 1971 (age 55); Alma, Quebec, Canada
- Listed height: 5 ft 11 in (1.80 m)
- Listed weight: 185 lb (84 kg)

Career information
- Position: Slotback
- University: Concordia
- CFL draft: 1996: undrafted

Career history

Playing
- 1996: Ottawa Rough Riders
- 1997: Edmonton Eskimos
- 1998–2001: Montreal Alouettes

Coaching
- 2002: Montreal Carabins (OC)
- 2007–2011: Sherbrooke Vert et Or (HC)
- 2014: Montreal Alouettes (AC)
- 2015: Montreal Alouettes (RC)
- 2015: Montreal Alouettes (STC)
- 2017–2022: Montreal Alouettes (RBC)
- 2020–2022: Montreal Alouettes (AHC)
- 2023: Saskatchewan Roughriders (RBC)
- 2024: Calgary Stampeders (RBC)
- 2025–present: Winnipeg Blue Bombers (RBC)

André Bolduc (born March 25, 1971, in Alma, Quebec) is a Canadian former professional football slotback who is the running backs coach for the Winnipeg Blue Bombers of the Canadian Football League (CFL).

== University career ==
Bolduc played CIAU football as a wide receiver for the Concordia Stingers from 1992 to 1995. He was a member of the 1993 Dunsmore Cup championship team and was an All-Star in 1994 and 1995.

== Professional career ==
As a professional player, Bolduc played for six seasons for the Ottawa Rough Riders, Edmonton Eskimos, and Montreal Alouettes of the CFL.

== Coaching career ==
=== RSEQ ===
Bolduc began his coaching career with the Montreal Carabins in 2002 as the team's offensive coordinator before joining Collège Montmorency to coach the Nomades. Bolduc then became the head coach of the Sherbrooke Vert et Or in 2007 and led the team to its first playoff win in 2010. He resigned as head coach following the 2011 season, citing the need to spend more time with his family.

=== Montreal Alouettes ===
In 2014, Bolduc joined the Montreal Alouettes as an offensive assistant coach. He became the receivers coach in 2015 and was the special teams assistant coach in 2016. He moved to running backs coach in 2017 and added the title of assistant head coach in 2020 with Khari Jones as the team's head coach. In early December 2022, it was reported that Bolduc was one of five finalists for the vacant Alouettes head coaching job.

=== Saskatchewan Roughriders ===
On February 7, 2023, it was announced that Bolduc had joined the Saskatchewan Roughriders as the team's run game coordinator and running backs coach.

=== Calgary Stampeders ===
On January 29, 2024, the Calgary Stampeders announced that they had hired Bolduc to be the team's running backs coach.

=== Winnipeg Blue Bombers ===
On March 7, 2025, it was announced that Bolduc had been hired by the Winnipeg Blue Bombers to serve as the team's running backs coach.

== Personal life ==
André and his partner, Patricia Dufort, are the parents of four children: Thomas, Raphaël, Justine, and Elizabeth.
