= 2004 CIS football season =

- Duration: September 2, 2004 – October 30, 2004
- Hardy Cup champions: Saskatchewan Huskies
- Yates Cup champions: Wilfrid Laurier Golden Hawks
- Dunsmore Cup champions: Laval Rouge et Or
- Loney Bowl champions: Saint Mary's Huskies
- Mitchell Bowl champions: Saskatchewan Huskies
- Uteck Bowl champions: Laval Rouge et Or

Vanier Cup
- Date: November 27, 2004
- Venue: Ivor Wynne Stadium, Hamilton
- Champions: Laval Rouge et Or

CIS football seasons seasons
- 2003 2005

The 2004 CIS football season began on September 2, 2004, and concluded with the 40th Vanier Cup national championship on November 27 at Ivor Wynne Stadium in Hamilton, Ontario, with the Laval Rouge et Or winning its third championship and second consecutive. Twenty-seven universities across Canada competed in CIS football this season, the highest level of amateur play in Canadian football, under the auspices of Canadian Interuniversity Sport (CIS).

== Awards and records ==
=== Awards ===
- Hec Crighton Trophy – Jesse Lumsden, McMaster
- Presidents' Trophy – Mickey Donovan, Concordia
- Russ Jackson Award – Nathan Beveridge, UBC
- J. P. Metras Trophy – Troy Cunningham, Concordia
- Peter Gorman Trophy – Kyle Williams, Bishop's

== All-Canadian team ==
=== First Team ===
Offence
Steve Bilan, QB, Saskatchewan
Jesse Lumsden, RB, McMaster
Andre Durie, RB, York
Andrew Fantuz, WR, Western
Andrew Ginther, WR, Alberta
Arjei Franklin, IR, Windsor
Nathan Beveridge, IR, UBC
Dominic Picard, C, Laval
Ben Walsh, G, McGill
Fabio Filice, G, McMaster
Pierre Tremblay, T, Laval
Richard Yalowsky, T, Calgary
Defence
Troy Cunningham, DE, Concordia
Kyle Markin, DE, Acadia
Nick Johansson, DT, UBC
Marc-André Dion, DT, Laval
David Lowry, LB, Alberta
Jason Pottinger, LB, McMaster
Mickey Donovan, LB, Concordia
Gregory Lavaud, CB, Montréal
Eric Nielsen, CB, Acadia
Derek Baldry, HB, Alberta
Ian Logan, HB, Laurier
Jason Milne, FS, Alberta
Special Teams
Mike Renaud, P, Concordia
Rob Pikula, K, Western

=== Second Team ===
Offense
Ryan Pyear, QB, Laurier
Jarred Winkel, RB, Alberta
Jeronimo Huerta Flores, RB, Laval
Kenneth Branco, WR, Ottawa
Ivan Birungi, WR, Acadia
Michael Black, IR, Acadia
Iain Fleming, IR, Queen's
Evan Haney, C, Calgary
Geoff St. Denis, G, Western
Adam Krajewski, G, Simon Fraser
Ryan Jeffrey, T, Laurier
Chris Sutherland, T, Saskatchewan
Defence
Ricky Foley, DE, York
Jeff Robertshaw, DE, McMaster
Ryan Gottselig, DT, Saskatchewan
Andrew Jones, DT, McMaster
Marc Trépanier, LB, Montréal
Jesse Alexander, LB, Laurier
Matt Harding, LB, Mount Allison
Conor Healey, CB, Laurier
Ryan Barnstable, CB, Saskatchewan
Dustin Cherniawski, HB, UBC
Sebastian Clovis, HB, Saint Mary's
John Sullivan, FS, Waterloo
Special Teams
Rob Pikula, P, Western
No nomination, K

== Results ==
=== Regular season standings ===
Note: GP = Games Played, W = Wins, L = Losses, OTL = Overtime Losses, PF = Points For, PA = Points Against, Pts = Points

Canada West
Team	GP	W	L	OTL	PF	PA	Pts
**Alberta**	8	7	1	0	235	145	14
**Saskatchewan**	8	6	2	0	276	91	12
**UBC**	8	5	3	0	235	212	10
**Calgary**	8	4	4	0	147	189	8
Manitoba	8	3	5	0	191	237	6
Simon Fraser	8	3	5	0	174	232	6
Regina	8	0	8	1	116	268	1

Ontario
Team	GP	W	L	OTL	PF	PA	Pts
**Laurier**	8	8	0	0	343	132	16
**McMaster**	8	7	1	0	395	119	14
**Western**	8	6	2	0	370	189	12
**Ottawa**	8	5	3	0	190	236	10
**Guelph**	8	4	4	0	169	238	8
**York**	8	3	5	0	220	237	6
Windsor	8	3	5	0	201	241	6
Waterloo	8	2	6	1	149	296	5
Queen's	8	2	6	0	211	192	4
Toronto	8	0	8	0	82	450	0

Quebec
Team	GP	W	L	PF	PA	Pts
**Montreal**	8	8	0	256	75	16
**Laval**	8	7	1	222	66	14
**Concordia**	8	4	4	157	152	8
**McGill**	8	4	4	162	158	8
Sherbrooke	8	3	5	135	246	6
Bishop's	8	1	7	100	243	2

Atlantic
Team	GP	W	L	PF	PA	Pts
**Acadia**	8	5	3	254	156	10
**Saint Mary's**	8	5	3	215	131	10
**StFX**	8	3	5	154	245	6
Mount Allison	8	0	8	64	248	0

Teams in bold have earned playoff berths.

=== Top 10 ===
CIS Top 10 Rankings
	01	02	03	04	05	06	07	08	09	10
Acadia Axemen	NR	NR	NR	NR	NR	NR	NR	NR	NR	NR
Alberta Golden Bears	7	5	4	3	1	7	7	7	5	5
Bishop's Gaiters	NR	NR	NR	NR	NR	NR	NR	NR	NR	NR
Calgary Dinos	NR	NR	NR	NR	NR	10	10	NR	NR	NR
Concordia Stingers	5	8	NR	NR	9	8	8	8	10	NR
Guelph Gryphons	NR	NR	NR	10	NR	NR	NR	NR	NR	NR
Laurier Golden Hawks	NR	NR	9	7	3	2	2	2	2	2
Laval Rouge et Or	3	3	3	6	5	4	5	4	3	3
Manitoba Bisons	NR	NR	NR	NR	NR	NR	NR	NR	NR	NR
McGill Redmen	NR	NR	NR	NR	NR	NR	NR	NR	NR	NR
McMaster Marauders	2	2	2	2	7	6	6	6	4	4
Montreal Carabins	10	7	5	4	2	1	1	1	1	1
Mount Allison Mounties	NR	NR	NR	NR	NR	NR	NR	NR	NR	NR
Ottawa Gee-Gees	NR	NR	10	8	8	NR	NR	NR	NR	NR
Queen's Golden Gaels	8	NR	NR	NR	NR	NR	NR	NR	NR	NR
Regina Rams	NR	NR	NR	NR	NR	NR	NR	NR	NR	NR
Saint Mary's Huskies	1	1	1	1	6	5	4	5	8	10
Saskatchewan Huskies	4	4	7	5	4	3	3	3	6	6
Sherbrooke Vert et Or	NR	NR	NR	NR	NR	NR	NR	NR	NR	NR
St. Francis Xavier X-Men	NR	NR	NR	NR	NR	NR	NR	NR	NR	NR
Simon Fraser Clan	6	6	6	9	NR	NR	NR	NR	NR	NR
Toronto Varsity Blues	NR	NR	NR	NR	NR	NR	NR	NR	NR	NR
UBC Thunderbirds	NR	NR	NR	NR	NR	NR	NR	10	9	8
Waterloo Warriors	NR	NR	NR	NR	NR	NR	NR	NR	NR	NR
Western Mustangs	9	10	8	NR	10	9	9	9	7	7
Windsor Lancers	NR	9	NR	NR	NR	NR	NR	NR	NR	NR
York Lions	NR	NR	NR	NR	NR	NR	NR	NR	NR	NR

NR = Not ranked.

=== Championships ===
The Vanier Cup is played between the champions of the Mitchell Bowl and the Uteck Bowl, the national semi-final games. In 2005, according to the rotating schedule, the winners of the Canada West conference Hardy Trophy met the winners of the Atlantic conference Loney Bowl championship for the Mitchell Bowl. The Ontario conference's Yates Cup championship team travelled to the Dunsmore Cup Quebec champion for the Uteck Bowl.
