= Rob Pikula =

Canadian football player

No. 14
- Positions: Placekicker, punter

Personal information
- Born: December 23, 1981 (age 44); Brantford, Ontario, Canada
- Listed height: 5 ft 9 in (1.75 m)
- Listed weight: 175 lb (79 kg)

Career information
- University: Western Ontario

Career history
- 2006: Saskatchewan Roughriders*
- 2006: BC Lions
- 2007: Winnipeg Blue Bombers
- 2008: BC Lions*
- 2008: Edmonton Eskimos*
- * Offseason or practice squad member only

Awards and highlights
- Grey Cup champion (2006)
- Stats at CFL.ca

Robert Pikula (born December 23, 1981) is a Canadian former professional football kicker/punter who played in the Canadian Football League (CFL). He went to The University of Western Ontario and played for the Western Mustangs, and was named a 2004 CIS All-Star. He was signed by the Saskatchewan Roughriders in February 2006. During training camp, he shared kicking duties with Luca Congi. He was released by the Roughriders in June 2006 and signed as a free agent by the Lions on June 20. He played 4 games for the Lions on his first season in 2006 as a backup kicker and punter where he hit 6/7 field goals, 85.7%, and punted 6 times with 48.2 yard average. He was dressed during B.C.'s 2006 Grey Cup victory. The Blue Bombers traded the BC Lions a third round draft pick for the 2008 draft to acquire Rob during the second week of the 2007 CFL season. In February, 2008, he was traded back to B.C. in exchange for Sebastian Clovis then traded on to Edmonton on March 20 in exchange for a higher draft pick.
