= Bishop O'Byrne High School =

Location
- 333 Shawville Boulevard SE; Calgary, Alberta, T2Y 4H3; Canada; 50.898073°N 114.065630°W

Information
- School type: High School
- Religious affiliation: Roman Catholic
- Founded: 2001
- School board: Calgary Catholic School District
- Principal: Nathan Easton
- Principal: Ionela Popescu
- Grades: 10-12
- Enrollment: 1600
- Language: English
- Colours: Navy and Gray
- Team name: Bobcats
- Website: www.cssd.ab.ca/schools/bishopobyrne/Pages/default.aspx

Bishop O'Byrne High School is a Roman Catholic high school located in Calgary, Alberta which is being operated under the jurisdiction of the Calgary Catholic School District. The school's designated boundaries include the deep southwest communities of Calgary like Bridlewood, Millrise, and Shawnessy, and southeast quadrants of Calgary like Midnapore, McKenzie Lake, and Sundance.

== History ==
In mid 1990s, the provincial government approved funding for a new high schools to be built in order to serve the expanding south communities of Calgary. Bishop O’Byrne High School opened on September 4, 2001.

The school is named after the sixth bishop of Calgary, His Excellency Bishop Paul O’Byrne.

== Academics ==
The school offers a grade 10 Honours/International Baccalaureate (IB) Diploma Programme.

== Athletics ==
Bishop O'Byrne Bobcats participates as a Division I member school in the Calgary Senior High School Athletic Association (student body populous 1700+) and the Alberta Schools Athletic Association.

The school offers a specialize and designate Sports Performance Hockey Program.
