= Chris Bodnar =

Canadian football player (born 1988)

No. 13
- Positions: Kicker, Punter

Personal information
- Born: April 10, 1988 (age 38); Saskatoon, Saskatchewan, Canada
- Listed height: 5 ft 11 in (1.80 m)
- Listed weight: 190 lb (86 kg)

Career information
- CJFL: Saskatoon Hilltops
- University: Saskatchewan; Regina
- CFL draft: 2010: undrafted

Career history
- 2011: Edmonton Eskimos*
- 2012: Saskatchewan Roughriders*
- 2013: Saskatchewan Roughriders*
- * Offseason or practice squad member only
- Stats at CFL.ca (archive)

Chris Bodnar (born April 10, 1988) is a Canadian former professional football placekicker and punter. He was originally signed by the Edmonton Eskimos as an undrafted free agent in January 2011, but was released prior to training camp on June 4, 2011. He was later signed by the Roughriders on December 21, 2011. He played two years of CIS football for the Saskatchewan Huskies football team before joining the Saskatoon Hilltops of the Canadian Junior Football League. He then transferred to the University of Regina where he played two seasons for the Regina Rams.

On April 19, 2013, it was announced Bodnar was released by the Riders a second time.
