= Mike Gibson (Canadian football) =

American gridiron football coach (born 1958)

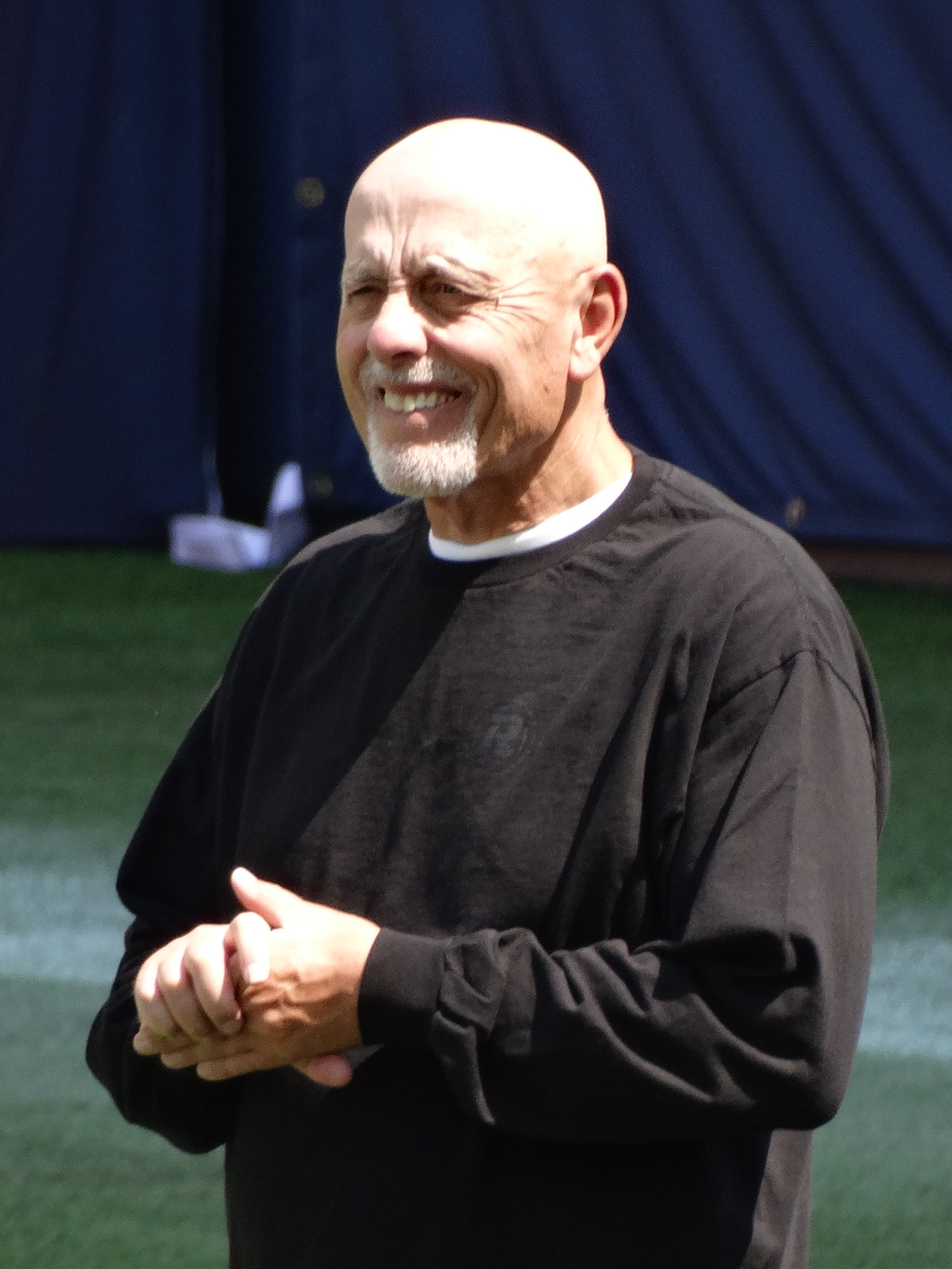
- Gibson with the Ottawa Redblacks in 2025

Ottawa Redblacks
- Title: Offensive line coach

Personal information
- Born: 1958 (age 67–68); McKeesport, Pennsylvania, U.S.

Career information
- College: Western Maryland

Career history

Coaching
- 1979–1981: Cornell Big Red (Head freshman coach)
- 1982–1985: Boston Terriers (Running backs coach)
- 1986–1987: Boston Terriers (Offensive coordinator, Quarterbacks coach)
- 1990–1991: Temple Owls (Special teams coach, Tight ends coach)
- 1992: Temple Owls (Offensive line coach)
- 1993–1995: Colgate Raiders (Offensive coordinator, Quarterbacks coach)
- 1996–2000: Rutgers Scarlet Knights (Special teams coach, Tight ends coach)
- 2001: Winnipeg Blue Bombers (Offensive line coach)
- 2002–2004: Louisiana Ragin' Cajuns (Offensive line coach)
- 2005–2006: Winnipeg Blue Bombers (Offensive coordinator)
- 2007–2008: Saskatchewan Roughriders (Offensive line coach)
- 2009–2010: Hamilton Tiger-Cats (Offensive coordinator, Assistant head coach)
- 2011: Calgary Stampeders (Running backs coach)
- 2012–2013: Calgary Stampeders (Offensive line coach)
- 2014: Ottawa Redblacks (Offensive coordinator)
- 2015: Regina Rams (Head coach)
- 2016–2018: Edmonton Eskimos (Offensive line coach, Run game coordinator)
- 2019: Edmonton Eskimos (Offensive line coach, Assistant head coach)
- 2020–2024: Hamilton Tiger-Cats (Offensive line coach)
- 2025–present: Ottawa Redblacks (Offensive line coach)

Operations
- 1988–1989: Rice Owls (Director of football operations, Recruiting coordinator)

Awards and highlights
- Grey Cup champion (2007)

Mike Gibson is the offensive line coach for the Ottawa Redblacks of the Canadian Football League (CFL). He is a Grey Cup champion, having won the 95th Grey Cup as an assistant coach with the Saskatchewan Roughriders.

== College career ==
Gibson played college football for the Western Maryland Green Terror from 1974 to 1977.

== Coaching career ==
=== NCAA ===
Gibson began his coaching career with the Cornell Big Red in 1979 as a head freshman coach. After three years with Cornell, he joined the Boston University Terriers in 1982 and became the team's offensive coordinator in 1986. He was later hired by the Rice Owls football program as their director of football operations and recruiting coordinator in 1988. After two seasons with Rice, he returned to coaching with the Temple Owls as their special teams coach and tight ends coach. In 1993, he was named offensive coordinator and quarterbacks coach for the Colgate Raiders. From 1996 to 2000, he was coaching the Rutgers Scarlet Knights as their special teams coach and tight ends coach.

=== Winnipeg Blue Bombers ===
On April 2, 2001, it was announced that Gibson had joined the Winnipeg Blue Bombers as the team's offensive line coach.

=== NCAA (II) ===
Gibson returned to coach college football in 2002 for the Louisiana Ragin' Cajuns as their offensive line coach. He served in that capacity for three seasons.

=== Winnipeg Blue Bombers (II) ===
Gibson returned to the Winnipeg Blue Bombers in 2005 to serve as the team's offensive coordinator. After the team finished in fifth place in the West with a 5–13 record, he was retained under new head coach, Doug Berry, in 2006 as the team returned to the playoffs with a 9–9 record. He resigned following the 2006 season.

=== Saskatchewan Roughriders ===
Gibson joined the Saskatchewan Roughriders ahead of their 2007 season as the team's offensive line coach. In that season, he won his first Grey Cup championship following the Roughriders' victory over Gibson's former team, the Blue Bombers, in the 95th Grey Cup game. He spent two seasons with the Roughriders.

=== Hamilton Tiger-Cats ===
On December 10, 2008, Gibson was announced as the offensive coordinator for the Hamilton Tiger-Cats. He spent two seasons with the team, qualifying for the playoffs in both, before resigning following the 2010 season.

=== Calgary Stampeders ===
On December 17, 2010, Gibson had joined the Calgary Stampeders as the team's running backs coach. In 2012, Gibson became the team's offensive line coach and served in that role for two seasons.

=== Ottawa Redblacks ===
Gibson joined the expansion Ottawa Redblacks in 2014 to serve as the team's offensive coordinator. However, the team struggled in their first year as they finished last in total points scored, touchdowns, and rushing yards and finished seventh in passing yards. He was relieved of his coaching duties by the Redblacks at the end of their season on November 12, 2014.

=== Regina Rams ===
On December 29, 2014, Gibson was named head coach for the Regina Rams of CIS football. He spent one season with the Rams as the team posted an 0–8 record prior to his resignation on January 17, 2016.

=== Edmonton Eskimos ===
On January 17, 2016, it was announced that Gibson had joined the Edmonton Eskimos as the team's offensive line coach and run game coordinator. He was promoted to assistant head coach and offensive line coach ahead of the 2019 season.

=== Hamilton Tiger-Cats (II) ===
On February 6, 2020, Gibson was named the offensive line coach for the Hamilton Tiger-Cats. While the 2020 CFL season was cancelled, he served in that capacity for the following four seasons.

=== Ottawa Redblacks (II) ===
On January 31, 2025, it was announced that Gibson had joined the coaching staff of the Ottawa Redblacks as the team's offensive line coach.

== Personal life ==
Gibson and his wife, Carolyn, have two daughters.
