= Samuel Hurl =

Canadian gridiron football player (born 1990)

No. 31
- Position: Linebacker

Personal information
- Born: April 26, 1990 (age 36); Calgary, Alberta, Canada
- Listed height: 6 ft 1 in (1.85 m)
- Listed weight: 234 lb (106 kg)

Career information
- University: Calgary
- CFL draft: 2012: 2nd round, 12th overall pick

Career history
- 2012–2014: Saskatchewan Roughriders
- 2015–2017: Winnipeg Blue Bombers
- 2018–2019: Saskatchewan Roughriders

Awards and highlights
- 101st Grey Cup champion
- Stats at CFL.ca

Samuel Hurl (born April 26, 1990) is a Canadian former professional football linebacker. He was drafted 12th overall by the Roughriders in the 2012 CFL draft. He played CIS football for the Calgary Dinos. Hurl won the 101st Grey Cup Championship Game for the Saskatchewan Roughriders at home on November 24, 2013.

== Professional career ==
=== Saskatchewan Roughriders ===
Hurl was drafted by the Saskatchewan Roughriders with the 12th pick in the 2012 CFL draft. He signed with the Roughriders on May 31, 2012.

=== Winnipeg Blue Bombers ===
Upon entering free agency, Hurl signed with the Winnipeg Blue Bombers on February 10, 2015.

=== Saskatchewan Roughriders (II) ===
Hurl once again became a free agent in 2018 and was signed by the Roughriders on February 14, 2018.
