= Kyle Quinlan =

Canadian football player (born 1989)

Profile
- Position: Quarterback

Personal information
- Born: February 10, 1989 (age 37); South Woodslee, Ontario, Canada
- Listed height: 6 ft 3 in (1.91 m)
- Listed weight: 205 lb (93 kg)

Career information
- University: McMaster
- CFL draft: 2012: undrafted

Career history

Playing
- 2012: Montreal Alouettes*
- 2013: Montreal Alouettes*
- * Offseason or practice squad member only

Coaching
- 2013–2014: McMaster Marauders (RB)
- 2015: Holland Hurricanes (HC/OC)
- 2016: York Lions (OC)
- 2017–2018: McMaster Marauders (Co-OC)

Awards and highlights
- Lois and Doug Mitchell Award Winner (2013); 47th Vanier Cup MVP; 2011 Uteck Bowl MVP; 2011 Yates Cup MVP; Hec Crighton Trophy (2012); 2× Yates Cup Champion (2011, 2012); Highest single season OUA pass completion percentage (68.9%); Most career touchdown passes by a McMaster Marauder (60)
- Stats at CFL.ca

Kyle Quinlan (born February 10, 1989) is a former college football quarterback and formerly the co-offensive coordinator for the McMaster Marauders in the Ontario University Athletics conference of U Sports football. He played collegiately with the Marauders of the OUA where he won the Ted Morris Memorial Trophy as the Most Valuable Player in the 47th Vanier Cup, en route to winning the Marauder's first football national championship. In 2012, Quinlan won the Hec Crighton Trophy as the CIS football Most Valuable Player. On April 29, 2013, Quinlan was named the CIS male athlete of the year for 2013.

== Professional career ==
Quinlan signed with the Montreal Alouettes on May 8, 2012 after being undrafted in the 2012 CFL draft. He played in the Alouettes second pre-season game, completing two of four passes for 45 yards, before being released during the team's final training camp cuts. After completing his college eligibility with McMaster, Quinlan re-signed with the Alouettes on December 21, 2012. In May 2013 it was announced that Quinlan would not be joining the Alouettes for their 2013 training camp, despite having signed a 3-year contract in December.

== Coaching career ==
Quinlan decided not to pursue his CFL career, instead he joined the McMaster Marauders coaching staff as the team's running backs coach in May 2013. He then joined the Holland College Hurricanes as the team's head coach and offensive coordinator on July 15, 2015. He won the Moosehead Cup championship that year, but left the team after only one season.

On November 27, 2015, he was hired by the York Lions to become the offensive coordinator of their football team.

On December 1, 2016, it was announced that Quinlan would be returning to the McMaster Marauders as co-offensive coordinator, sharing duties with Tom Flaxman. Quinlan resigned from his position at the end of the 2018 season.

Preceded by Sébastien Lévesque	Vanier Cup MVP; 2011	Succeeded by Maxime Boutin
