= Regina Rams =

Gridiron football team of the University of Regina

- Regina Rams logo
- First season: 1954; 72 years ago
- Athletic director: Lisa Robertson
- Head coach: Mark McConkey; 6th year, 20–26–0 (.435)
- Other staff: Mark McConkey (OC); Sheldon Gray (DC)
- Home stadium: Mosaic Stadium
- Year built: 2016
- Stadium capacity: 33,000
- Stadium surface: FieldTurf
- Location: Regina, Saskatchewan
- League: U Sports
- Conference: Canada West (1999 – present)
- Past associations: MSJFL (1954–1975); CJFL (1976–1998)
- All-time record: 94–119–1 (.442)
- Postseason record: 11–18 (.379)

Titles
- Vanier Cups: 0
- Atlantic Bowls: 1; 2000
- Canadian Bowls: 15; 1966, 1970, 1971, 1973, 1975, 1976, 1980, 1981, 1986, 1987, 1993, 1994, 1995, 1997, 1998
- Hardy Cups: 2; 2000, 2024
- Hec Crighton winners: 1 Noah Picton

Current uniform
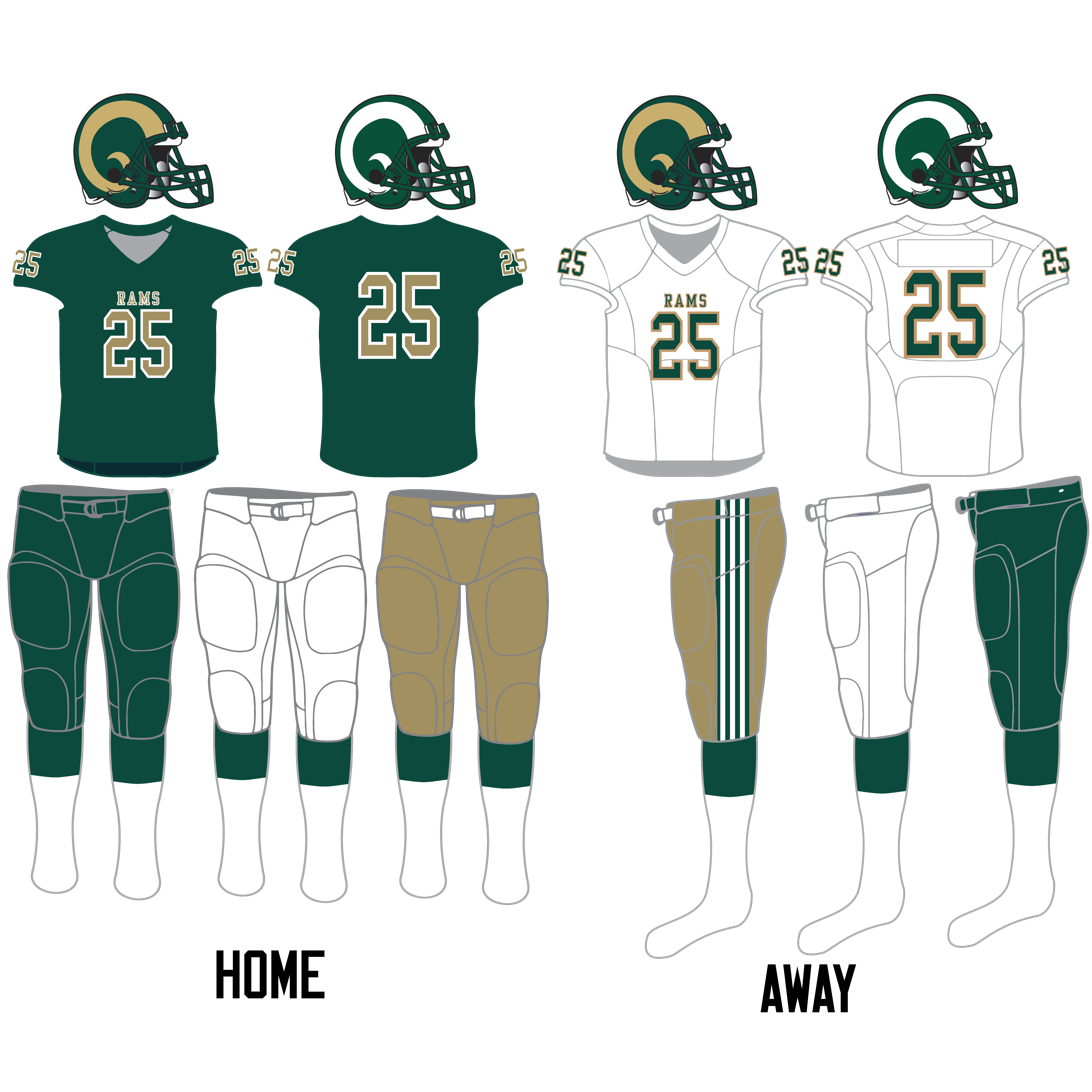
- Colours: Green and Gold
- Outfitter: Under Armour
- Rivals: Saskatchewan Huskies
- Website: reginarams.com/football

The Regina Rams represent the University of Regina, located in Regina, Saskatchewan, in the sport of Canadian football in U Sports. The Rams joined U Sports in 1999 and have competed in the Canada West Conference since then. The program has won two U Sports football conference championships, in 2000 and 2024, and the team has made one appearance in the Vanier Cup championship game.

The Rams nickname is used by the university's football team only; all of the other teams at the school are named the Regina Cougars.

== History ==
Old logo for the Regina Rams.

The Regina Rams were formed in 1954 when two junior football teams, the Bombers and the Dales, merged into one football club. The Rams participated in the Man-Sask Junior Football League until 1976, when they joined with junior teams from Alberta to form the Prairie Football Conference. The club would participate in the CJFL until 1998, winning ten Canadian Junior Football Championships along the way.

In 1999, after competing for 45 years in junior football (Canadian Junior Football League), the Regina Rams became a member of the Canada West Conference of the Canadian Intercollegiate Athletic Union (CIAU), later Canadian Interuniversity Sport (CIS) and now U Sports. The University of Regina came to community partnership agreement with the CJFL team that made the transfer possible. Rather than change their name to Regina Cougars, the football team continued to use the moniker "Rams." In only their second year of playing in the CIAU, the Rams won the Canada West Conference championship and then the Atlantic Bowl. They then went on their way to the Vanier Cup where they lost 42–39 to Marcel Bellefeuille's Ottawa Gee-Gees in the 36th Vanier Cup.

Frank McCrystal was the head coach of the Rams from their inception in the CIS until 2014. He took the reins of the team in 1984, making 2014 his 31st season as head coach of the Rams and his 16th in the CIS. In 2007, after leading his team to a 6–2 regular season record and an appearance in the Hardy Cup game, McCrystal was named Canadian Interuniversity Sport Coach of the Year and received the 2007 Frank Tindall Trophy.

The Rams played the inaugural sporting event at Mosaic Stadium on October 1, 2016, hosting the University of Saskatchewan Huskies. At the end of the 2016 season, quarterback Noah Picton became the first Rams player to win the Hec Crighton Trophy after completing 224 passes out of 323 attempts for 3,186 yards with 25 touchdowns and nine interceptions. That was also the first season that the Rams finished in first place in the Canada West regular season.

== CIAU/CIS/U Sports Regular Season Results ==
Season	G	W	L	OTL	PCT	PF	PA	Standing	Playoffs
1999	8	0	8	-	0.000	121	309	6th in CW	Out of Playoffs
2000	8	4	4	-	0.500	218	281	3rd in CW	Defeated Calgary Dinos in semi-final 33–32; Defeated Manitoba Bisons in Hardy Cup 25–22; Defeated Saint Mary's Huskies in Atlantic Bowl 40–36; Lost to Ottawa Gee-Gees in 36th Vanier Cup 42–39
2001	8	5	3	-	0.625	278	208	2nd in CW	Defeated Saskatchewan Huskies in semi-final 58–31; Lost to Manitoba Bisons in Hardy Cup 23–17
2002	8	5	3	0	0.625	169	153	3rd in CW	Defeated Calgary Dinos in semi-final 39–17; Lost to Saskatchewan Huskies in Hardy Cup 44–28
2003	8	4	3	1	0.563	248	246	3rd in CW	Lost to Simon Fraser Clan in semi-final 53–46
2004	8	0	8	0	0.000	116	268	7th in CW	Out of Playoffs
2005	8	3	5	0	0.375	188	276	5th in CW	Out of Playoffs
2006	8	4	4	0	0.500	278	256	4th in CW	Lost to Manitoba Bisons in semi-final 44–29
2007	8	6	2	-	0.750	257	195	2nd in CW	Defeated Saskatchewan Huskies in semi-final 19–13; Lost to Manitoba Bisons in Hardy Cup 48–5
2008	8	5	3	-	0.250	163	179	3rd in CW	Lost to Calgary Dinos in semi-final 24–17
2009	8	3	5	-	0.375	174	224	4th in CW	Lost to Saskatchewan Huskies in semi-final 53–23
2010	8	5	3	-	0.625	281	181	3rd in CW	Lost to Calgary Dinos in semi-final 40–33
2011	8	5	3	-	0.625	123	154	3rd in CW	Lost to Calgary Dinos in semi-final 16–4
2012	8	6	2	-	0.750	214	160	2nd in CW	Defeated Saskatchewan Huskies in semi-final 31–9; Lost to Calgary Dinos in Hardy Cup 38–14
2013	8	2	6	-	0.250	224	279	5th in CW	Out of Playoffs
2014	8	3	5	-	0.375	239	294	4th in CW	Lost to Calgary Dinos in semi-final 56–0
2015	8	0	8	-	0.000	177	339	6th in CW	Out of Playoffs
2016	8	6	2	-	0.750	277	218	1st in CW	Lost to UBC Thunderbirds in semi-final 40–34
2017	8	4	4	-	0.500	259	283	3rd in CW	Lost to UBC Thunderbirds in semi-final 28–21
2018	8	1	7*	-	0.125	107	217	6th in CW	Out of Playoffs
2019	8	3	5	-	0.375	211	189	5th in CW	Out of Playoffs
2020	Season cancelled due to COVID-19 pandemic								
2021	6	1	5	-	0.167	58	131	6th in CW	Out of Playoffs
2022	8	5	3	-	0.625	195	159	2nd in CW	Lost to UBC Thunderbirds in semi-final 28–14
2023	8	1	7	-	0.125	155	268	6th in CW	Out of Playoffs
2024	8	3	5	-	0.375	157	177	4th in CW	Defeated Manitoba Bisons in semi-final 28–25; Defeated Saskatchewan Huskies in Hardy Cup 19–14; Lost to Laval Rouge et Or in Mitchell Bowl 17–14
2025	8	6	2	-	0.750	246	172	2nd in CW	Defeated Manitoba Bisons in semi-final 32–29 (2OT); Lost to Saskatchewan Huskies in Hardy Cup 25–24
2026	8	4	4	-	0.500	212	146	3rd in CW	Defeated Saskatchewan Huskies in semi-final 39–27; Lost to UBC Thunderbirds in Hardy Cup 41–39 (2OT)

- (*)The Rams forfeited three wins in 2018 due to use of an ineligible player. Those games were then awarded as 1–0 wins to Alberta, UBC, and Manitoba.

== National U Sports Postseason Results ==
Vanier Cup Era (1965–present)
Year	Game	Opponent	Result
2000	Atlantic Bowl Vanier Cup	Saint Mary's Ottawa	W 40–36 L 39–42
2024	Mitchell Bowl	Laval	L 14–17

Regina is 1–1 in national semi-final games and 0–1 in the Vanier Cup.

== Head coaches ==
Coach name	Tenure	Notes
Toar Springstein	1954–1955	
Bill Ciz	1956–1958	
Bert Iannone	1959–1962	
Paul Anderson	1962–1963	
Bill Ciz	1964	
Gordon Currie	1965–1976	
Mel Fissel	1977	
Gerry Zbytnuik	1978–1980	
Frank McCrystal	1981–2014	
Mike Gibson	2015	
Steve Bryce	2016–2019	
Mark McConkey	2020–present	

== National award winners ==
- Hec Crighton Trophy: Noah Picton (2016)
- Presidents' Trophy: Mat Nesbitt (2007)
- Frank Tindall Trophy: Frank McCrystal (2007)
- Gino Fracas Award: Dwayne Masson (2025)

== Regina Rams in the professional ranks ==
As of the start of the 2026 CFL season, nine former Rams players were on CFL teams' rosters:

- Tevaughn Campbell, Saskatchewan Roughriders
- Jaxon Ford, Saskatchewan Roughriders
- D'Sean Mimbs, Saskatchewan Roughriders
- Dolani Robinson, Calgary Stampeders
- Tanner Schmekel, Winnipeg Blue Bombers
- Carson Sombach, Saskatchewan Roughriders
- Jackson Sombach, Calgary Stampeders
- Ryder Varga, Saskatchewan Roughriders
- Josh White, Ottawa Redblacks
