= Frank McCrystal =

Career history
- 1981–2014: Regina Rams (HC)
- Canadian Football Hall of Fame (Class of 2025)

Frank McCrystal is a Canadian former football coach who served as the head coach of the Regina Rams, the CIS football team at the University of Regina in Regina, Saskatchewan, Canada from 1981 to 2014. In 2007, McCrystal was named Canadian Interuniversity Sport Coach of the Year and received the 2007 Frank Tindall Trophy award. McCrystal accepted the head coaching position with the Rams in 1984 while they were members of the Canadian Junior Football League (CJFL). He is a seven-time Canadian Bowl champion having led the Rams to wins in 1986, 1987, 1993, 1994, 1995, 1997, and 1998.

McCrystal was announced as a member of the Canadian Football Hall of Fame 2025 class on June 12, 2025.
