= 2016 CIS football season =

- Duration: August 28 – October 29
- Hardy Trophy champions: Calgary Dinos
- Yates Cup champions: Wilfrid Laurier Golden Hawks
- Dunsmore Cup champions: Laval Rouge et Or
- Loney Bowl champions: St. Francis Xavier X-Men
- Mitchell Bowl champions: Calgary Dinos
- Uteck Bowl champions: Laval Rouge et Or

Vanier Cup
- Date: November 26
- Venue: Hamilton, Ontario
- Champions: Laval Rouge et Or

CIS football seasons seasons
- 2015 2017

The 2016 CIS football season began on August 28 with ten Ontario University Athletics teams playing that day. The season concluded on November 26 with the 52nd Vanier Cup championship at Tim Hortons Field in Hamilton, Ontario. In 2016, 27 university teams were scheduled to play Canadian Interuniversity Sport football, the highest level of amateur Canadian football.

During the 2016 season, CIS adopted the new name of U Sports, with the name change officially taking effect on October 20.

== Regular season standings ==
2016 Canada West standings
(Rank) Team	W		L	PF		PA	PTS	Playoff Spot
#4 Regina	6	-	2	277	-	218	12	†
#6 Calgary	6	-	2	294	-	167	12	X
#9 Saskatchewan	5	-	3	261	-	205	10	X
UBC	3	-	5	250	-	245	6	X
Manitoba	3	-	5	276	-	323	6	
Alberta	1	-	7	155	-	355	2	
† – Conference Champion; Rankings: CIS Top 10

2016 OUA standings
(Rank) Team	W		L	PF		PA	PTS	Playoff Spot
#3 Western	7	-	1	393	-	148	14	†
#5 Laurier	7	-	1	341	-	126	14	X
#7 McMaster	6	-	2	260	-	87	12	X
#8 Carleton	6	-	2	318	-	150	12	X
Ottawa	6	-	2	303	-	227	10	X
Guelph	3	-	5	244	-	227	6	X
Queen's	3	-	5	236	-	210	6	
York	2	-	6	171	-	384	4	
Windsor	2	-	6	164	-	380	4	
Toronto	2	-	6	155	-	288	4	
Waterloo	0	-	8	77	-	435	0	
† – Conference Champion; Rankings: CIS Top 10

2016 RSEQ standings
	Overall							Conf			Playoff Spot
(Rank) Team	W		L	PF		PA	PTS	W		L	Playoff Spot
#2 Montréal	7	-	1	296	-	72	14	6	-	1	†
#1 Laval	7	-	1	289	-	78	12	6	-	1	X
Concordia	4	-	4	182	-	227	8	3	-	4	X
McGill	4	-	4	156	-	173	8	4	-	4	X
Sherbrooke	3	-	5	148	-	168	6	3	-	5	
Bishop's	1	-	7	100	-	341	2	0	-	7	
† – Conference Champion; Rankings: CIS Top 10

2016 AUS standings
	Overall							Conf			Playoff Spot
(Rank) Team	W		L	PF		PA	PTS	W		L	Playoff Spot
#10 St. FX	7	-	1	299	-	129	14	7	-	0	†
Mount Allison	3	-	5	157	-	238	6	3	-	4	X
Acadia	2	-	6	124	-	214	4	2	-	5	X
Saint Mary's	2	-	6	126	-	239	4	2	-	5	
† – Conference Champion; Rankings: CIS Top 10

=== Top 10 ===
FRC-CIS Top 10 Rankings
Team \ Week	1	2	3	4	5	6	7	8	9	10
Acadia Axemen	NR	NR	14 (6)	NR	NR	NR	NR	NR	NR	NR
Alberta Golden Bears	NR	NR	NR	NR	NR	NR	NR	NR	NR	NR
Bishop's Gaiters	NR	NR	NR	NR	NR	NR	NR	NR	NR	NR
Calgary Dinos	7 (147-2)	3 (220)	2 (267-3)	2 (266)	5 (171)	5 (182)	5 (189)	4 (220-1)	5 (153)	6 (144)
Carleton Ravens	9 (37)	6 (125)	4 (169)	10 (38)	10 (45)	6 (120)	6 (126)	6 (136)	8 (128)	8 (128)
Concordia Stingers	11 (18)	11 (33)	12 (12)	12 (3)	NR	NR	12 (3)	13 (4)	NR	13 (1)
Guelph Gryphons	6 (177)	10 (41)	11 (32)	13 (1)	NR	NR	NR	NR	NR	NR
Laurier Golden Hawks	10 (37)	9 (62)	7 (101)	5 (178)	6 (153)	7 (118)	7 (121)	7 (124)	6 (153)	5 (167)
Laval Rouge et Or	3 (218)	4 (207)	3 (221)	3 (238)	2 (264)	2 (266)	2 (266)	1 (290-21)	1 (293-23)	1 (296-26)
Manitoba Bisons	5 (182-1)	8 (76)	NR	NR	9 (54)	11 (5)	NR	NR	NR	NR
McGill Redmen	NR	NR	NR	14 (1)	NR	NR	NR	NR	NR	NR
McMaster Marauders	8 (146-1)	5 (202-1)	9 (94)	7 (105)	8 (79)	8 (115)	8 (113)	5 (150)	4 (155)	7 (137)
Montreal Carabins	2 (261-5)	1 (276-13)	1 (297-27)	1 (300-30)	1 (300-30)	1 (300-30)	1 (300-30)	2 (270-6)	2 (273-5)	2 (267-4)
Mount Allison Mounties	14 (5)	18 (1)	NR	NR	NR	NR	NR	NR	NR	NR
Ottawa Gee-Gees	NR	12 (18)	8 (99)	6 (159)	7 (148)	9 (65)	9 (65)	9 (36)	9 (39)	12 (2)
Queen's Golden Gaels	NR	NR	NR	NR	NR	NR	NR	NR	NR	NR
Regina Rams	NR	17 (1)	15 (1)	9 (54)	4 (188)	4 (206)	4 (198)	8 (111)	7 (141)	4 (180)
Saint Mary's Huskies	NR	NR	NR	NR	NR	NR	NR	NR	NR	NR
Saskatchewan Huskies	12 (13)	13 (15)	10 (64)	8 (87)	13 (1)	14 (1)	14 (2)	12 (22)	10 (36)	9 (60)
Sherbrooke Vert et Or	15 (2)	14 (10)	NR	NR	14 (1)	NR	13 (2)	11 (23)	NR	NR
St. Francis Xavier X-Men	13 (6)	16 (2)	13 (7)	12 (9)	12 (2)	13 (3)	11 (4)	10 (26)	NR	10 (27)
Toronto Varsity Blues	NR	NR	NR	NR	NR	NR	NR	NR	NR	NR
UBC Thunderbirds	1 (266-20)	2 (264-16)	6 (139)	11 (12)	11 (25)	10 (28)	10 (29)	14 (1)	NR	11 (7)
Waterloo Warriors	NR	NR	NR	NR	NR	NR	NR	NR	NR	NR
Western Mustangs	4 (188-2)	7 (97)	5 (161)	4 (197)	3 (219)	3 (238)	3 (234)	3 (234-2)	3 (243-2)	3 (235)
Windsor Lancers	NR	15 (4)	NR	NR	NR	NR	NR	NR	NR	NR
York Lions	NR	NR	NR	NR	NR	NR	NR	NR	NR	NR

Ranks in italics are teams not ranked in the top 10 poll but received votes.
NR = Not ranked, received no votes.
Number in parentheses denotes number votes, after the dash number of first place votes.

== Post-season awards ==
CIS post-season awards
	Quebec	Ontario	Atlantic	Canada West	NATIONAL
Hec Crighton Trophy	Samuel Caron (Montreal)	Derek Wendel (Ottawa)	Tivon Cook (St. Francis Xavier)	Noah Picton (Regina)	Noah Picton (Regina)
Presidents' Trophy	Jonathan Boisonneault-Glaou (Montreal)	Nakas Onyeka (Wilfrid Laurier)	DeAndre Smith (Saint Mary's)	D. J. Lalama (Manitoba)	D. J. Lalama (Manitoba)
J. P. Metras Trophy	Mathieu Betts (Laval)	Sean Jamieson (Western)	Vernon Sainvil (St. Francis Xavier)	Geoff Gray (Manitoba)	Mathieu Betts (Laval)
Peter Gorman Trophy	Adam Auclair (Laval)	Adam Preocanin (McMaster)	Jakob Loucks (Mount Allison)	Nicholas Dheilly (Regina)	Jakob Loucks (Mount Allison)
Russ Jackson Award	Shayne Cowan-Cholette (Bishop's)	Mark Mackie (McMaster)	Will Wojcik (Acadia)	Cam Teschuk (Manitoba)	Cam Teschuk (Manitoba)
Frank Tindall Trophy	Danny Maciocia (Montreal)	Michael Faulds (Wilfrid Laurier)	Gary Waterman (St. Francis Xavier)	Steve Bryce (Regina)	Michael Faulds (Wilfrid Laurier)

=== All-Canadian team ===
==== First team ====
Offence
QB – Noah Picton – Regina
RB – Tyler Chow – Saskatchewan
RB – Alex Taylor – Western
IR – Kaion Julien-Grant – St. Francis Xavier
IR – Mitchell Picton – Regina
WR – Louis-Mathieu Normandin – Montreal
WR – Nathaniel Behar – Carleton
C – Matthew Van Praet – Western
G – Geoff Gray – Manitoba
G – Zach Intzandt – McMaster
T – Vernon Sainvil – St. Francis Xavier
T – Jean-Simon Roy – Laval
Defence
DT – Rupert Butcher – Western
DT – Vincent Desjardins – Laval
DE – Mathieu Betts – Laval
DE – Michael Kashak – McMaster
LB – DeAndre Smith – Saint Mary's
LB – D. J. Lalama – Manitoba
LB – Nakas Onyeka – Laurier
FS – Stavros Katsantonis – British Columbia
HB – Malcolm Thompson – Laurier
HB – Malcolm Brown – Western
CB – Godfrey Onyeka – Laurier
CB – Samuel Polan – Sherbrooke
Special teams
P – Félix Ménard-Brière – Montreal
K – Sean Stenger – Saskatchewan
RET – Tunde Adeleke – Carleton

==== Second team ====
Offence
QB – Derek Wendel – Ottawa
RB – Jordan Socholotiuk – St. Francis Xavier
RB – Jayde Rowe – Carleton
IR – Austen Hartley – Calgary
IR – Mitchell Baines – Ottawa
WR – Dejuan Martin – St. Francis Xavier
WR – Danny Vandervoort – McMaster
C – Levi Hua – British Columbia
G – Samuel Lefebvre – Laval
G – Ryan Sceviour – Calgary
T – Evan Johnson – Saskatchewan
T – Sean Jamieson – Western
Defence
DT – Donovan Dale – British Columbia
DT – Junior Luke – Montreal
DE – Kwaku Boateng – Laurier
DE – Jonathan Boissonneault-Glaou – Montreal
LB – Frédéric Chagnon – Montreal
LB – Jean-Gabriel Poulin – Western
LB – Alexandre Gagné – Sherbrooke
FS – Brandon Jennings – Acadia
HB – Robert Woodson – Calgary
HB – Adam Auclair – Laval
CB – Adam Laurensse – Calgary
CB – Robbie Yochim – McMaster
Special teams
P – TJ Morton – Toronto
K – Adam Preocanin – McMaster
RET – Marcus Davis – UBC

== Championships ==
The Vanier Cup is played between the champions of the Mitchell Bowl and the Uteck Bowl, the national semi-final games. In 2016, according to the rotating schedule, the Canada West champions host the AUS champions in the Mitchell Bowl and be the home team at the Vanier Cup, while the RSEQ champions host the OUA champions in the Uteck Bowl.

=== Conference Playoffs ===
==== Atlantic University Sport ====
November 5 Semifinal			November 12; Loney Bowl
			1	St. FX	29
2	Mt. Allison	27	2	Mt. Allison	8
3	Acadia	18

==== Réseau du sport étudiant du Québec ====
November 5 Semifinals
1	Montreal	42
4	McGill	0
2	Laval	39
3	Concordia	14

November 12; Dunsmore Cup
1	Montreal	17
2	Laval	20

==== Ontario University Athletics ====
October 29; Quarterfinals
4	Carleton	45
5	Ottawa	9
3	McMaster	17
6	Guelph	11

November 5 Semifinals
1	Western	51
4	Carleton	24
2	Laurier	21
3	McMaster	17

November 12; 109th Yates Cup
1	Western	40
2	Laurier	43

==== Canada West Universities Athletic Association ====
November 5 Semifinals
1	Regina	34
4	UBC	40
2	Calgary	47
3	Saskatchewan	17

November 12; 80th Hardy Trophy
4	UBC	43
2	Calgary	46

=== National Semifinals ===
Uteck Bowl

Quarter	1	2	3	4	Total
Laurier	0	0	0	6	6
Laval	14	15	7	0	36

at Telus Stadium, Quebec City, Quebec

- Date: November 19
- Game time: 12:30 p.m. EST
- Game weather: Fair, 9°C
- Game attendance: 13,526
- Referee: Brent Young
- TV: Sportsnet 360, TVA Sports
- Boxscore
Mitchell Bowl

Quarter	1	2	3	4	Total
St. FX	7	7	3	7	24
Calgary	5	13	22	10	50

at McMahon Stadium, Calgary, Alberta

- Date: November 19
- Game time: 2:00 p.m. MST
- Game weather: Overcast, 0°C
- Game attendance: 2,184
- Referee: J. Popplestone
- TV: Sportsnet 360, TVA Sports
- Boxscore

=== National Championship ===
52nd Vanier Cup

Quarter	1	2	3	4	Total
Laval	7	3	14	7	31
Calgary	14	3	3	6	26

at Tim Hortons Field, Hamilton, Ontario

- Date: November 26
- Game time: 1:00 p.m. EST
- Game weather: Cloudy with sun, 5°C
- Referee: K. Edgeworthy
- TV: Sportsnet, TVA Sports
- Boxscore
