= 27th Vanier Cup =

1991 Canadian university football championship

1991 Vanier Cup
- CIAU National Championship Game; 27th Vanier Cup
- Logo of the 27th Vanier Cup
Wilfrid Laurier Golden Hawks	Mount Allison Mounties
(8–2)	(8–2)
OUAA	AUAA
25	18
Head coach: Rich Newbrough	Head coach: Marc Loranger
	1	2	3	4	Total
Wilfrid Laurier	11	0	13	1	25
Mount Allison	0	4	7	7	18
- Date: November 30, 1991
- Stadium: SkyDome
- Location: Toronto, Ontario
- MVP: RB Andy Cecchini (Wilfrid Laurier)
- National anthem: Lewis Orr; Lester B. Pearson High School Choir
- Referee: Doug Rideout
- Attendance: 30,191

International TV coverage
- Network: English: TSN; French: RDS
- Announcers: Michael Landsberg (Play-by-Play); Jamie Bone (Analyst); Leif Pettersen (Sightlines); Larry Haylor (Guest Sightlines); Gord Miller (Sidelines)

The 1991 Vanier Cup was the 27th edition of the Vanier Cup and deciding game to determine the CIAU football national champion for the 1991 season. It was played on November 30, 1991, at the Skydome in Toronto, Ontario, Canada. The Wilfrid Laurier Golden Hawks, representing the Ontario Universities Athletics Association, defeated the Mount Allison Mounties, representing the Atlantic Universities Athletics Association, by a score of 25–18. With the win, Wilfrid Laurier clinched the 1991 national championship, the team's first in its history. An estimated total of 30,191 people attended the game in person, second-most at the time, while surpassing approximately 600 thousand Canadian viewers watched the game on TSN television from the previous year.

The game kicked off at 3 p.m. EST, with Mount Allison receiving the opening kickoff from placekicker Pat O'Leary. Wilfrid Laurier scored first with a punt single by O'Leary and a 36-yard field goal by Spiros Anastasakis, before running back Andy Cecchini capped a drive with a touchdown run to give the Golden Hawks an 11-point lead. Mount Allison answered with a 38-yard field goal by Eric Deegan, but trailed by seven points at halftime. In the third quarter, Laurier capitalized on a Mounties fumble when Cecchini scored his second touchdown of the game, then caught a 20-yard pass from quarterback Bill Kubas for another, extending the lead by twenty points. The Mounties responded with a trick play as running back Grant Kearney rushed for a touchdown, cutting the deficit to 24–11 after three quarters. In the fourth quarter, quarterback Sean Hickey connected with running back Mark Huys on a 38-yard touchdown pass, and Deegan's conversion narrowed the margin to 24–18. Laurier's offense stalled late, but O'Leary added a single in the final minute to secure a 25–18 victory for the Golden Hawks.

For his performance in the game, Wilfrid Laurier wide receiver Andy Cecchini was named a recipient of the Teddy Morris Memorial Trophy, awarded to the game's most valuable player. Although Allison lost the game, several of its players won postseason awards—Sean Hickey won Offensive Player of the Game while George Wright wins Defensive Player of the Game award.

== Road to the Vanier Cup ==
By structure, the two finalists in Canadian university football earned their spot in the Vanier Cup by winning the national semifinals. In 1991, the semifinals were the Churchill Bowl and the Atlantic Bowl. The participants were the champions of Canada's four regional conferences: Ontario University Athletics Association (OUAA), Canada West Universities Athletic Association (CWUAA), Atlantic University Athletic Association (AUAA), and the Fédération du sport scolaire du Québec (FSSQ). At the time, since its inaugural practice, the Vanier Cup was held at Toronto, and the Skydome since the 1989, serving as the neutral-site championship for Canadian university football. Later, in 2002, the Atlantic Bowl was replaced by the Uteck Bowl, in honour of Larry Uteck. The Churchill Bowl replaced by the Mitchell Bowl, and the Vanier Cup itself eventually began rotating host cities instead of being fixated in Toronto. In 2003, the 40th Vanier Cup was hosted by Hamilton at Ivor Wynne Stadium.

=== Bracket ===
November 16; CIAU Semifinals
#1 Laurier	44
#2 Queen's	22
#3 Mount Allison	31
#4 Saskatchewan	14

November 30; 27th Vanier Cup
#1 Laurier	25
#3 Mount Allison	18

=== Wilfrid Laurier ===
The Wilfrid Laurier Golden Hawks ended the 1990 season with a 23–18 loss to the Western Mustangs in the OUAA Semifinals. The loss was the fourth of the season for Laurier, ending their season at a .500 winning percentage. Laurier players and coaches entered the off-season to improve from the year before, and were voted the No. 7 team in the country in the annual CIAU preseason poll. Wilfrid Laurier had greatly surpassed its expectation as the No. 7 ranked team in the country, winning their first four games of the 1991 season, starting with them defeating Guelph, 27–23 at Seagram Stadium, where wide receiver Andy Cecchini sets the OUAA's career rushing record.

The following three weeks saw explosion of as Laurier routed the McMaster Marauders, 37–14, the Windsor Lancers, 63–7, which was the 40th win in Rich Newbrough's tenure at WLU, and the Toronto Varsity Blues, 18–0. In Week 5, Wilfrid Laurier faced off against the Western Mustangs, who were undefeated as well, losing 56–37 at J. W. Little Memorial Stadium. After a dominant 42–9 victory over the York Yeomen, the Golden Hawks were hammered by their rivals, Waterloo, 34–7. However, in the OUAA playoffs, the Golden Hawks went on a cinderella run. Ranked No. 7, Laurier proceeded to dominate their bracket, blowing out Waterloo, 35–5, upsetting No. 1 ranked Western, 13–12, and even came back from 22 points down to upset the Queen's Golden Gaels, 44–22, in the CIAU Semifinals, finding themselves in the 27th Vanier Cup for the fourth time in the team's history. After the win against the Mustangs, the polls awarded Wilfrid Laurier No. 1 in the CIAU rankings heading into the championship game. A few days before the national championship game, Newbrough, was named CIAU Coach of the Year, the second coach in team history to be honoured up to that point, after Tuffy Knight.

=== Mount Allison ===
Unlike Wilfrid Laurier, the Mount Allison Mounties began the 1991 season with low expectations. In 1989, 2 years prior to their Vanier Cup appearance, the team went 0–7, their first winless season since their 1978 campaign, being outscored in points, 316–96. In 1990, the Mounties had a bounce-back season, winning 5 contests in 6 games, tying themselves with the Saint Mary's Huskies for first place in the conference. They both play a tiebreaker to determine the conference seeding, with the Huskies defeating the Mounties 55–17. This win secured the Huskies first place seeding of the AUAA. The following week, the two teams played each other for the AUAA conference championship game, with the Huskies defeating the Mounties, yet again, by a score of 43–8, ending Mount Allison's season.

Mounties players and coaches entered the off-season hoping to improve upon their season the year before, and were voted the No. 10 team in the country in the annual CIAU preseason poll. After a 9–0 season-opening loss versus the Acadia Axemen, the Mounties went on to win five games in a row, including the team's 100th career win following a game against St. Francis Xavier 49–15 where they clinched a playoff berth in the AUAA championship game. On November 2, the Mounties defeated Saint Mary's, 24–21, clinching the #1 seed of the AUAA. In the playoffs, Mount Allison upset both 1990 Vanier Cup finalists, Saint Mary's, 25–24, in the AUAA championship and Saskatchewan in the CIAU Semifinals to advance to the Vanier Cup championship game.

== Game summary ==
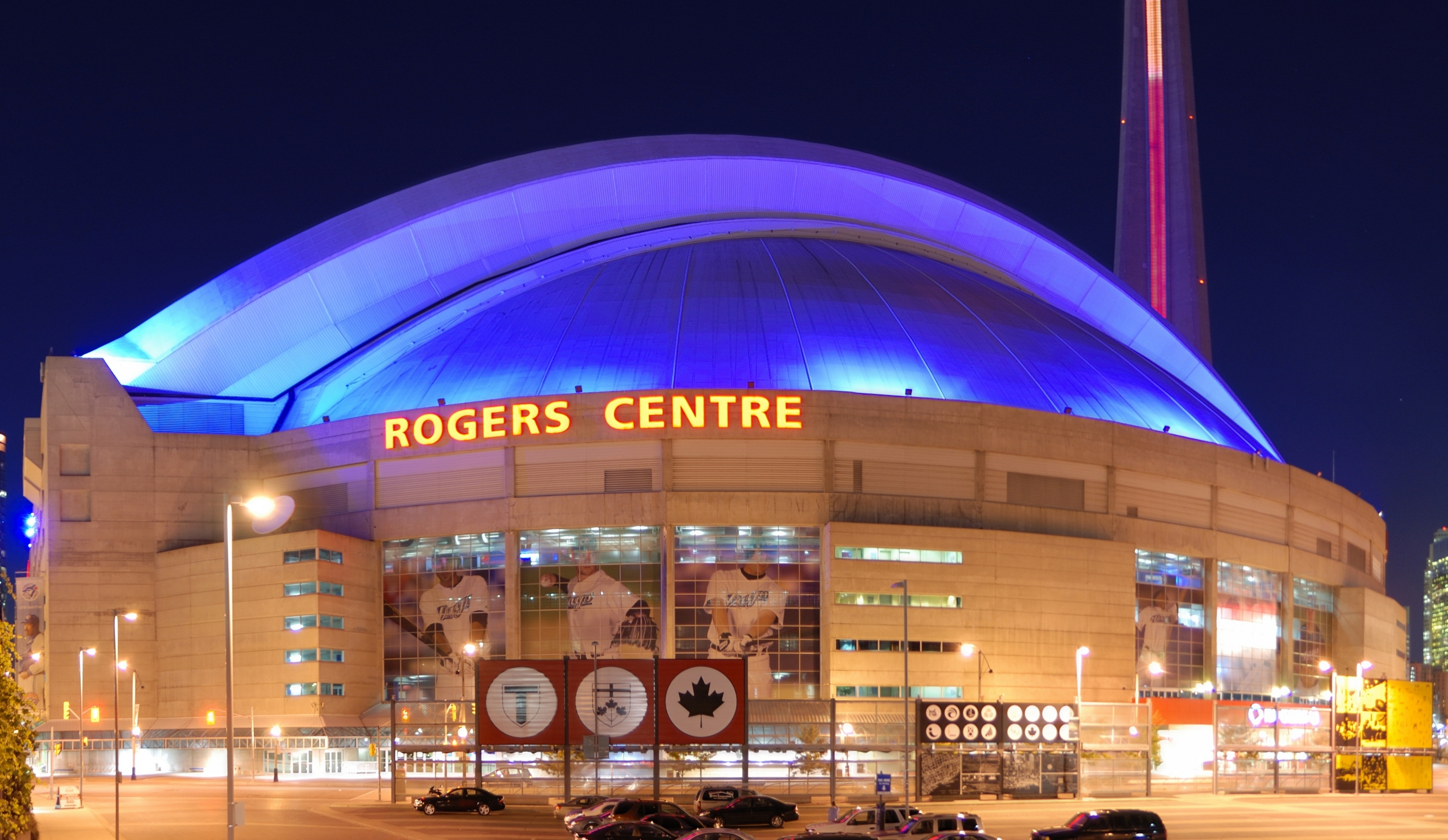
The Rogers Centre (then SkyDome), home of the 1991 Vanier Cup, as seen illuminated during the night in 2008.

The 1991 Vanier Cup kicked off at 3 p.m. EST on November 30, 1991, at the SkyDome, in Toronto. A crowd of 30,191 people attended the game in person, and was estimated to have over 600 thousand people watched the game's television broadcast on TSN. Michael Landsberg, Jamie Bone, Leif Pettersen, guest Larry Haylor, and Gord Miller were the television commentators for the event. The pregame national anthem was performed by Lewis Orr, a former University of New Brunswick player, and a choir from Lester B. Pearson High School. Doug Rideout was the referee and performed the ceremonial pre-game coin toss to determine first possession of the ball. Mount Allison won the coin toss and elected to receive. Wilfrid Laurier kicked off to the Mounties to begin the game.

=== First quarter ===
Mount Allison received the ball to begin the game. The first points of the game came from a successful punt into the Mount Allison endzone by placekicker Pat O'Leary and a 36-yard field goal from placekicker Spiros Anastasakis, giving Wilfrid Laurier an early 4–0 lead in the first quarter. Momentum continued for the Golden Hawks, securing a fumble at 2nd and 7 on Allison's 48-yard line. Wilfrid Laurier's quarterback, Bill Kubas, threw a 50-yard completion pass to wide receiver Andrew Scharschmidt, a play that they scored a touchdown on by running back Andy Cecchini from Laurier's 99-yard line on 3rd and goal including a point conversion, extending the Golden Hawks' lead to 11–0, a lead they held onto the end of the first quarter.

=== Second quarter ===
The second quarter was promising for Mount Allison, who recovered a fumble off of Laurier's slotback Craig Brenner who ran into their team's first down line as Mounties' defensive back John Kosempei returned the football 32 yards. This proved to be crucial as placekicker Eric Deegan converts on a 38-yard field goal to put Mount Allison on the board. Later on, Deegan attempted another field goal, from 27.5 yards out but missed wide right. The quarter ended with the Golden Hawks leading 11–4 over Mount Allison.

=== Third quarter ===
During the third quarter, the Mounties squandered a fumble on their own 21-yard line, as Wilfrid Laurier's linebacker Marty Robinson pounced on the ball at the Laurier's 98 yard-line. The next play after, Kubas handed the ball off to Cecchini again for their second touchdown of the game. Wide receiver Ralph Spoltore of the Golden Hawks attempted to do a fake field goal however were stopped by the 1-yard line, keeping the score at 17–4. Later on in the quarter, on the 8th play of the drive, while 2nd and 12, Kubas completes a 20-yard pass to Cecchini once more for their third touchdown of the game. Anastasakis drilled an extra point conversion the play after, extending the Golden Hawks' lead to 24–4. However, near the end of the quarter, at the Allison's 35-yard line, quarterback Sean Hickey throws a bullet to wide receiver Sonny LaCroix who gains 37 yards on the drive. On the last play of the quarter, Hickey fakes themselves holding on to the football while running back Grant Keaney takes it from Mounties' offensive lineman Mike Jardine and takes it all the way down the field for a touchdown. Deegan converted on the extra point soon after to put Allison 24–11 after 3 quarters.

=== Fourth quarter ===
The fourth quarter began with Laurier's defensive back Lonny Taylor advancing the ball from the 15-yard line to the 43. However, the Golden Hawks were unable to convert on that drive. On a 2nd and 10 drive, Kubas threw an interception to Mounties' linebacker Dave Luna, allowing Mount Allison to drive the ball down the field, with Hickey gaining many yards from running. A few plays later, Hickey finds running back Mark Huys wide open on the right side of the field for a 38-yard touchdown, with Deegan converting once more on the extra point. This made the score 24–18 in favour of the Golden Hawks. Later in the quarter, Kubas handed it off to Cecchini who drove the ball for 40 yards. After a few more running attempts from Cecchini and Brenner, O'Leary punts the football 24 yards out on, once again, another failed play by the Golden Hawks. On the next possession, 2nd and 9, at the Mounties' 18-yard line, Sean Hickey dodges a sack and throws a 32-yard completed pass to running back Guy Messervier. However, a blunder on communication by Hickey costed them as they were sacked on 3rd down, turning possession around to Laurier. After multiple attempts to run down the field, the Golden Hawks settled on a single by O'Leary for a 25–18 lead with 50 seconds to play in the quarter. Driving up the field, Mount Allison had one last chance to tie the game. However, after a sack on Hickey, the Mounties produced another fake play up to Keaney but fails to reach the 1st down line, falling 6 yards short. The possession was turned over on downs, allowing Laurier to kneel the football and win the Vanier Cup.

== Scoring summary ==
Scoring Play	Score
First quarter
Wilfrid Laurier: Pat O'Leary 39 yard punt single, 3:55	Wilfrid Laurier 1, Mount Allision 0
Wilfrid Laurier: Spiros Anastasakis 36 yard field goal, 6:42	Wilfrid Laurier 4, Mount Allision 0
Wilfrid Laurier: Andy Cecchini 1 yard hand-off pass from Bill Kubas (Spiros Anastasakis kick), 13:10	Wilfrid Laurier 11, Mount Allision 0
Second quarter
Mount Allison: Eric Deegan 38-yard field goal, 5:44	Wilfrid Laurier 11, Mount Allision 3
Mount Allison: Eric Deegan 57 yard punt single, 11:53	Wilfrid Laurier 11, Mount Allision 4
Third quarter
Wilfrid Laurier: Andy Cecchini 2 yard hand-off pass from Bill Kubas (2-point conversion failed), 5:51	Wilfrid Laurier 17, Mount Allision 4
Wilfrid Laurier: Andy Cecchini 19-yard pass from Bill Kubas (Spiros Anastasakis kick), 14:31	Wilfrid Laurier 24, Mount Allision 4
Mount Allison: Grant Keaney 28-yard pass from Mike Jardine (Deegan kick), 15:00	Wilfrid Laurier 24, Mount Allision 11
Fourth quarter
Mount Allison: Mark Huys 38-yard pass from Sean Hickey (Deegan kick), 6:25	Wilfrid Laurier 24, Mount Allision 18
Wilfrid Laurier: Pat O'Leary 40 yard punt single, 14:10	Wilfrid Laurier 25, Mount Allision 18

== Statistical summary ==
In recognition of their achievements during the 27th Vanier Cup, Andy Cecchini won Teddy Morris Memorial Trophy honours, awarded to the game's most valuable player. Cecchini caught twenty-two carries for 130 yards and three touchdowns, leading all receivers in yardage and scores. Cecchini's three touchdowns during the game, then, tied a Vanier Cup record. It was later surpassed by Don Blair in the 31st Vanier Cup. Winning quarterback Bill Kubas completed 10 of his 20 pass attempts for 329 yards, and a touchdown for Wilfrid Laurier. However Mount Allison quarterback, Sean Hickey, whom of which won Offensive Player of the Game, passed over 150 yards including a touchdown and interception. Hickey also rushed for 44 yards. Mounties Grant Keaney caught twenty carries for 108 yards, including a trick play resulting in a 28-yard touchdown with Mike Jardine and Hickey. At a statistic standpoint, the Golden Hawks surpassed or tied most outcomes against the Mounties, scoring more first downs, touchdowns, rushing yards, total offense and committed less fumbles.

Statistical Comparison
	Mount Allison	Wilfrid Laurier
First downs	11	17
Rushing yards	184	232
Passing: Completions-Attempts-Interceptions	5–21–0	10–20–1
Passing yards	150	148
Total offense	334	380
Punts-average	8–41	12–38
Fumbles-lost	5–2	1–1
Penalties-yards	3–35	13–120

== Postgame effects ==
=== Awards ===
Despite Mount Allison losing the game, quarterback Sean Hickey won Offensive Player of the Game honors while linebacker George Wright wins the Defensive Player of the Game award. Cecchini was named the winner of the Teddy Morris Memorial Trophy while achieving three touchdowns in the Vanier Cup.

=== CFL draft ===
The 1992 CFL draft, held February 29 and March 1, in Hamilton, the first year eligible for any players from any of the 1991 rosters to be drafted into the Canadian Football League or the National Football League. Wilfrid Laurier had two players selected in the sixth round of the draft and three players taken overall. Defensive back Greg Knox was the first player picked, selected with the forty-seventh overall selection by the Calgary Stampeders. With the next pick, Calgary also selected Laurier's defensive back Tim Bisci. With the last pick of the draft, the Toronto Argonauts selected defensive line, Hugh Lawson.

In subsequent seasons, more players from the 1991 roster of Wilfrid Laurier were picked from the CFL; Slotback Brent Stucke (EDM), fullback P.J. Martin (HAM), and defensive line Reinhardt Keller (BC), picked at 11th, 12th and 39th overall respectively in 1993. In 1994, wide receiver Stefan Ptaszek (BC), slotback/fullback Craig Brenner (CGY), and linebacker Michael Chevers (HAM) picked 9th, 27th and 38th overall. Linebacker Gerry Smith (SAS), who was picked 38th overall, was the only Golden Hawks player from the original 1991 team in the draft, getting selected in 1995.

=== Subsequent seasons ===
Wilfrid Laurier entered the 1992 season with hopes of following up its victory in the 27th Vanier Cup with another national championship. The Laurier's regular-season performance improved slightly from 1991, as they won an extra regular-season game against York. After a 6-win campaign, the Golden Hawks finished second in the OUAA, behind the Toronto, ranked at No. 3 in the country. However, Laurier's dream to repeat fell short as they were upset in the OUA Semifinals by Western, 34–31, at Seagram Stadium.

Mount Allison, unlike Wilfrid Laurier, had hoped to attend the national championship game again however injuries placed them in a dangerous spot, losing to the Saint Mary's Huskies, finding them in a winner-move-on situation against the Acadia Axemen but were able to come back from 19 points down win 32–29. In the conference championship rematch of the previous season, it was the Huskies that came out on top, defeating the Mounties 32–10 to clinch an Atlantic Bowl appearance. Wilfrid Laurier appeared in the 41st (2005) and 59th (2024) Vanier Cups, 1991 was the most recent year that Mount Allison appeared in the championship game.
