= Larry Jusdanis =

Canadian gridiron football player (born 1970)

No. 8
- Position: Quarterback

Personal information
- Born: December 3, 1970 (age 55); Hamilton, Ontario, Canada
- Listed height: 6 ft 4 in (1.93 m)
- Listed weight: 236 lb (107 kg)

Career information
- High school: Glendale Secondary
- College: UCF (1989–1990)
- University: Acadia (1992–1995)
- CFL draft: 1995: 5th round, 47th overall pick

Career history
- 1995–1996: BC Lions
- 1996–1997: Hamilton Tiger-Cats
- 1997–1998: Montreal Alouettes
- 2001: Toronto Argonauts*
- * Offseason or practice squad member only

Awards and highlights
- First-team All-Canadian (1994, 1995); AUAA MVP (1994, 1995); Acadia Axemen all-time passing yards leader; Acadia Sports Hall of Fame

Larry Jusdanis (born December 3, 1970) is a Canadian former professional football quarterback who played two seasons in the Canadian Football League (CFL) with the Hamilton Tiger-Cats and Montreal Alouettes. He was selected by the BC Lions in the fifth round of the 1995 CFL draft. He played CIAU football for the Acadia Axemen. Jusdanis was also a member of the Toronto Argonauts, although he never played a regular season game for them.

== University career ==
After graduating from Glendale Secondary School in 1989, Jusdanis attended the University of Central Florida where he played two seasons with the UCF Knights.

After the 1990 season, Jusdanis moved to Acadia in the AUAA (now AUS) of Canada's CIAU (now U Sports) for 1991. In 1992, Jusdanis recorded 98 completions and 1,350 passing yards. In 1993, he passed for 2,055 yards, with a 383-yard performance in an overtime loss to the No. 1 ranked Saint Mary's Huskies in the AUAA championship game. In the 1994 season, he passed for 2,030 yards and was named first-team CIAU All Canadian and AUAA Most Valuable Player. In 1995, Jusdanis lead the Axemen to the Jewett Trophy and recorded a single-season school record 2,551 passing yards, including a single-game school record of 501 passing yards against the Mount Allison Mounties. He was once again named first-team All-Canadian and AUAA Most Valuable Player. He finished his career at Acadia as the school's all-time passing yards leader.

In 2015, Jusdanis was inducted into the Acadia Sports Hall of Fame.

== Professional career ==
In 1995, Jusdanis was the first Canadian university quarterback to be invited to the NFL Scouting Combine. He was the only Canadian university QB to be invited to the NFL's annual showcase until Wilfrid Laurier's Taylor Elgersma was invited to the 2026 edition.

Jusdanis was drafted by the BC Lions with the 47th pick in the 1995 CFL Draft. He was traded to the Hamilton Tiger-Cats for Roger Hennig in May 1996. Jusdanis started a game for the Tiger-Cats against the Calgary Stampeders in July 1996 after injuries to Matt Dunigan and Anthony Calvillo. Against the Stampeders, he threw one touchdown pass and three interceptions, losing to opposing quarterback Jeff Garcia.(cfl-scrapbook) He was released by the Tiger-Cats in October 1996 and re-signed by the team in May 1997. He was released by the Tiger-Cats in June 1997.

Jusdanis signed with the Montreal Alouettes on September 20, 1997. He was released by the Alouettes in May 1998.

Jusdanis attended training camp with the Toronto Argonauts in 2001 and was released before the start of the season.(cfl-scrapbook)

== Coaching career ==
Since the end of his pro football career, Jusdanis has founded football programs for Canadian players and has been a strength and conditioning coach and consultant.
