= Greg Knox (Canadian football) =

Canadian gridiron football coach (born 1969)

- Knox with the York Lions in 2026

York Lions
- Title: Defensive coordinator

Personal information
- Born: June 12, 1969 (age 57); Toronto, Ontario, Canada
- Listed height: 6 ft 1 in (1.85 m)
- Listed weight: 195 lb (88 kg)

Career information
- Position: Safety
- University: Wilfrid Laurier Golden Hawks
- CFL draft: 1992: 6th round, 47th overall pick

Career history

Playing
- 1992–1998: Calgary Stampeders

Coaching
- 2006–2012: McMaster Marauders (defensive coordinator)
- 2013: Toronto Varsity Blues (defensive coordinator)
- 2014: McMaster Marauders (defensive coordinator)
- 2015: Winnipeg Blue Bombers (linebackers coach)
- 2016–2018: McMaster Marauders (head coach) (defensive coordinator)
- 2019: Alberta Golden Bears (defensive coordinator)
- 2020–2021: Ottawa Redblacks (defensive back coach)
- 2024–present: York Lions (defensive coordinator)

Awards and highlights
- 2× Grey Cup champion (1992, 1998); CFL All-Star (1994); CFL West All-Star (1994); 2× Vanier Cup champion (1991, 2011)

Greg Knox (born June 12, 1969) is a Canadian football coach who is the defensive coordinator for the York Lions of U Sports football. He played professionally as a defensive back with the Calgary Stampeders for seven years where he won two Grey Cup championships (in 1992 and 1998). He is also a two-time Vanier Cup champion after winning as a player with the Wilfrid Laurier Golden Hawks in 1991 and then as a defensive coordinator with the McMaster Marauders in 2011. He was formerly the head coach of the Marauders from 2016 to 2018.

== University career ==
Knox attended Wilfrid Laurier University where he played defensive back for the Wilfrid Laurier Golden Hawks. He finished his CIAU football career with a Vanier Cup championship after winning in 1991.

== Professional career ==
Knox was drafted in the sixth round, 47th overall, in the 1992 CFL draft by the Calgary Stampeders. He played in 98 regular season games where he recorded 210 tackles, 22 interceptions, four sacks, and eight fumble recoveries. He won a Grey Cup championship in his rookie year in 1992 and won again in his final year in 1998. He was also named a 1994 CFL All-Star at safety after recording 10 interceptions, 57 defensive tackles, two sacks, and two fumble recoveries that year.

== Coaching career ==
=== McMaster Marauders ===
On March 22, 2006, it was announced that Knox had been hired as the defensive coordinator for the McMaster Marauders. The Marauders qualified for the playoffs in every season he was with the team, until 2012. The Marauders won the program's first Vanier Cup title in 2011 with Knox guiding the defense, leading to him winning his first championship as a coach.

=== Toronto Varsity Blues ===
In 2013, Knox joined the Toronto Varsity Blues football program as their defensive coordinator.

=== McMaster Marauders (II) ===
Knox returned to McMaster in 2014 where the team appeared in the 50th Vanier Cup, but lost to the Montreal Carabins.

=== Winnipeg Blue Bombers ===
It was announced on February 19, 2015, that Knox had joined the Winnipeg Blue Bombers as the team's linebackers coach. He was named the defensive backs coach for the 2016 season, but he resigned in May just prior to the start of the Blue Bombers' season to take the Head Coaching position at McMaster.

=== McMaster Marauders (III) ===
After Stefan Ptaszek left the Marauders to join the CFL's Hamilton Tiger-Cats, Knox was named the Marauders' interim head coach. After a 6–2 record in 2016, the interim tag was removed and Knox was named the full-time head coach. In his third year, in 2018, Knox was suspended following an interaction with a game official. After a review by the university's human resources department, Knox was fired on October 22, 2018, having coached only five games that year.

=== Alberta Golden Bears ===
On February 13, 2019, Knox was named the defensive coordinator for the Alberta Golden Bears. That year, the Golden Bears finished with a non-losing record for the first time since 2009 and qualified for the playoffs.

=== Ottawa Redblacks ===
On January 17, 2020, Knox was announced as the defensive backs coach for the Ottawa Redblacks. With the 2020 CFL season cancelled, he spent one season with the Redblacks in 2021. It was announced on April 1, 2022, that Knox had resigned from the Redblacks to take a position outside of football.

=== York Lions ===
On March 28, 2024, it was announced that Knox had been hired as the defensive coordinator for the York Lions.
