= Lucas Cormier =

Canadian gridiron football player (born 1994)

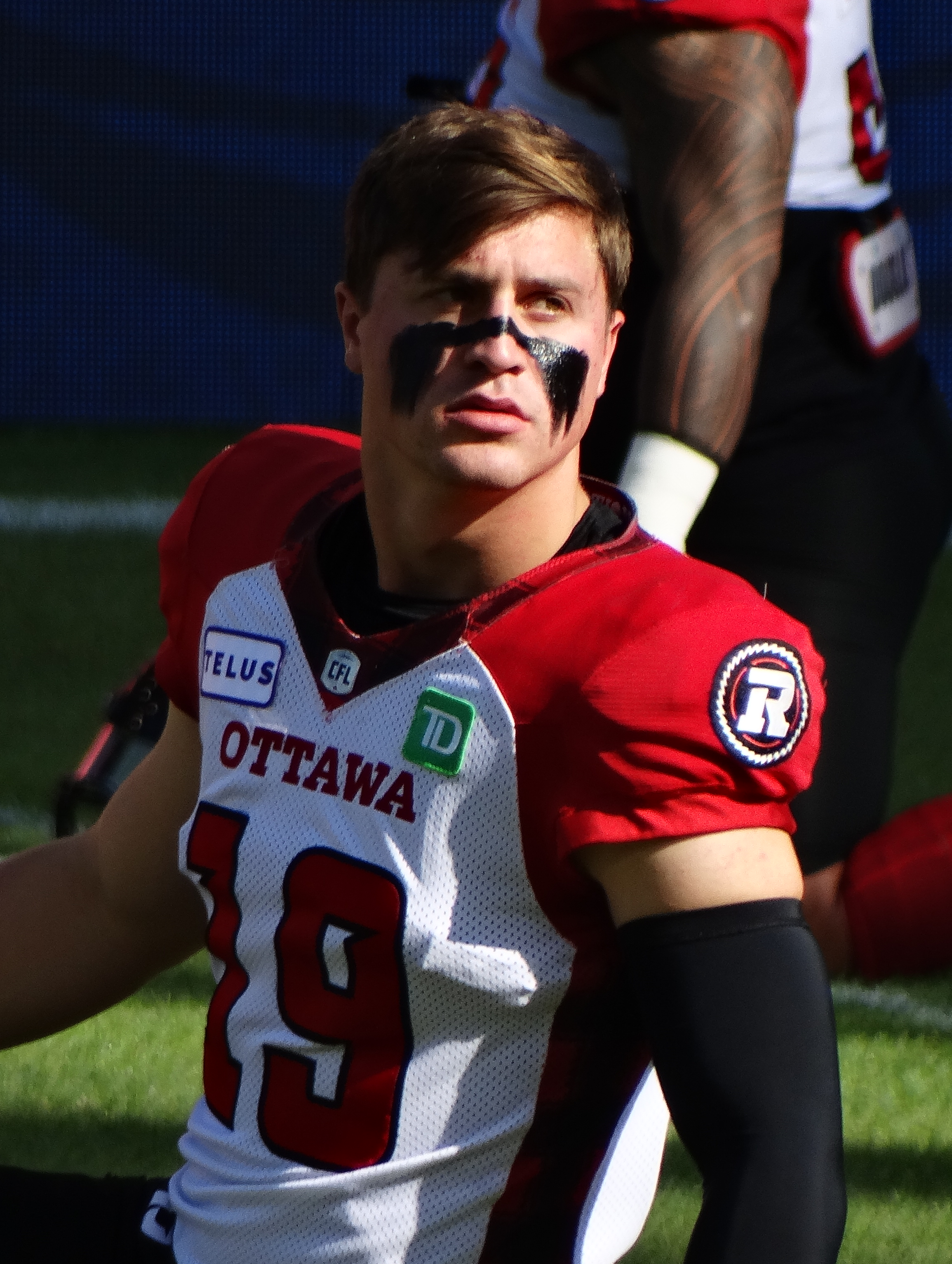
- Cormier with the Ottawa Redblacks in 2024

No. 19 – Ottawa Redblacks
- Position: Defensive back
- Roster status: Active
- CFL status: National

Personal information
- Born: May 7, 2001 (age 25); Sackville, New Brunswick, Canada
- Listed height: 6 ft 1 in (1.85 m)
- Listed weight: 210 lb (95 kg)

Career information
- High school: Tantramar Regional High
- University: Mount Allison
- CFL draft: 2023: 2nd round, 10th overall pick

Career history
- 2023–present: Ottawa Redblacks
- Stats at CFL.ca

Lucas Cormier (born May 7, 2001) is a Canadian professional football defensive back for the Ottawa Redblacks of the Canadian Football League (CFL).

== University career ==
Cormier played U Sports football for the Mount Allison Mounties from 2019 to 2022. After sitting out in 2020 due to the cancelled 2020 U Sports football season, he played in 21 games with the team where he had 74.5 tackles and nine interceptions while being named an AUS All-Star in all three seasons that he played.

== Professional career ==
Pre-draft measurables
Height	Weight	40-yard dash	20-yard shuttle	Three-cone drill	Vertical jump	Broad jump	Bench press
6 ft 1 1/4 in (1.86 m)	205 lb (93 kg)	4.62 s	4.26 s	7.09 s	35.0 in (0.89 m)	9 ft 4 3/8 in (2.85 m)	10 reps
All values from CFL Combine

Cormier was selected by the Ottawa Redblacks in the second round, 10th overall, of the 2023 CFL draft and became the second-highest drafted former Mountie player of all time, with Philippe Girard being drafted fifth overall in 1998 CFL draft. Cormier then signed with the team on May 9, 2023. Following training camp in 2023, he began the season on the injured list, but later made his professional debut on July 15, 2024, against the Winnipeg Blue Bombers. Cormier played in five games in his rookie year, spending time on bot the injured list and practice roster, where he had one defensive tackle and four special teams tackles.

Entering the 2024 season, the Redblacks asked Cormier to add 20 pounds as they looked to inset him at linebacker. He made the opening day active roster and played in the first eight games before suffering a foot injury in week 10 against the Saskatchewan Roughriders. He returned in week 20 where he injured his hand and sat out the last game of the season. Cormier played in nine regular season games where he recorded two defensive tackles and five special teams tackles. He returned to make his post-season debut where he had one special teams tackle in the East Semi-Final loss to the Toronto Argonauts.
