= Elgersma =

Elgersma is a surname. Notable people with the surname include:

- Lars Elgersma (born 1983), Dutch speed skater
- Taylor Elgersma (born 2002), Canadian American football player
