= 2023 Ottawa Redblacks season =

CFL team season

- General manager: Shawn Burke
- President: Adrian Sciarra
- Head coach: Bob Dyce
- Home stadium: TD Place Stadium

Results
- Record: 4–14
- Division place: 4th, East
- Playoffs: Did not qualify
- Team MOP: Devonte Williams
- Team MODP: Bryce Carter
- Team MOC: Cleyon Laing
- Team MOOL: Jacob Ruby
- Team MOST: Brandin Dandridge
- Team MOR: Dustin Crum

Uniform
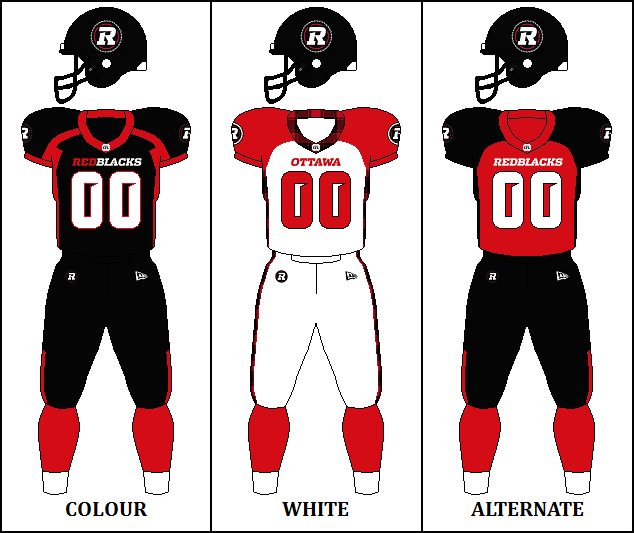

The 2023 Ottawa Redblacks season was the ninth season for the team in the Canadian Football League (CFL). The Redblacks were eliminated from playoff contention following their week 18 loss to the Montreal Alouettes. This was the fourth straight season that the Redblacks had failed to qualify for the post-season.

The 2023 CFL season was the second season for Shawn Burke as general manager. After Bob Dyce served as the interim head coach to end the 2022 season, this was his first full season as the team's head coach.

== Offseason ==
=== CFL global draft ===
The 2023 CFL global draft took place on May 2, 2023. The Redblacks had the first selection in both rounds.

Round	Pick	Player	Position	Club/School	Nationality
1	1	Blessman Ta’ala	DL	Hawaii	American Samoa
2	10	Lucas Lavin	OL	Chattanooga	Sweden

== CFL national draft ==
The 2023 CFL draft took place on May 2, 2023. The Redblacks had ten selections in the eight-round draft. The team had the first selection in each round of the draft after finishing last in the 2022 league standings (losing the tie-breaker to the Edmonton Elks), not including traded picks. This was the first time that Ottawa selected first overall since the 2015 CFL draft.

Notably, the team acquired additional second-round and third-round selections after trading the rights to Woodly Appolon to the Edmonton Elks and Terry Williams to the BC Lions. The Redblacks also traded their fourth-round pick to the Edmonton Elks in exchange for Nick Arbuckle. The team also upgraded their eighth-round selection to another seventh-round selection after trading Llevi Noel to the Elks.

Round	Pick	Player	Position	School	Hometown
1	1	Dontae Bull	OL	Fresno State	Victoria, BC
2	10	Lucas Cormier	DB	Mount Allison	Sackville, NB
2	12	James Peter	LB	Ottawa	Ottawa, ON
2	17T	Daniel Oladejo	WR	Ottawa	Ottawa, ON
3	19	Aidan John	DL	St. Mary's	Halifax, NS
3	25	Josh White	LB	Regina	Regina, SK
5	37	Daniel Perry	WR	Saskatchewan	Calgary, AB
6	46	Quintin Seguin	DL	Charleston Southern	Windsor, ON
7	55	Alexander Fedchun	DL	St. Francis Xavier	Calgary, AB
7	58	Amlicar Polk	RB	Ottawa	Ottawa, ON

== Preseason ==
=== Schedule ===
Week	Game	Date	Kickoff	Opponent	Results		TV	Venue	Attendance	Summary
Week	Game	Date	Kickoff	Opponent	Score	Record	TV	Venue	Attendance	Summary
A	Bye									
B	1	Fri, May 26	7:30 p.m. EDT	vs. Montreal Alouettes	L 21–22	0–1	TSN/RDS	TD Place Stadium	15,802	Recap
C	2	Thu, June 1	7:30 p.m. EDT	at Toronto Argonauts	W 34–23	1–1	None	Alumni Stadium	N/A	Recap

# Games played with white uniforms.

== Regular season ==
=== Standings ===
East Division
Team	GP	W	L	T	Pts	PF	PA	Div	Stk	
Toronto Argonauts	18	16	2	0	32	591	396	10–0	W4	Details
Montreal Alouettes	18	11	7	0	22	442	392	7–3	W5	Details
Hamilton Tiger-Cats	18	8	10	0	16	408	461	3–7	L2	Details
Ottawa Redblacks	18	4	14	0	8	415	507	0–10	L4	Details

=== Schedule ===
Week	Game	Date	Kickoff	Opponent	Results		TV	Venue	Attendance	Summary
Week	Game	Date	Kickoff	Opponent	Score	Record	TV	Venue	Attendance	Summary
1	1	Sat, June 10	7:00 p.m. EDT	at Montreal Alouettes	L 12–19	0–1	TSN/RDS/CBSSN	Molson Stadium	20,865	Recap
2	2	Thu, June 15	7:30 p.m. EDT	vs. Calgary Stampeders	L 15–26	0–2	TSN/RDS	TD Place Stadium	18,251	Recap
3	Bye									
4	3	Fri, June 30	7:30 p.m. EDT	vs. Edmonton Elks	W 26–7	1–2	TSN/RDS	TD Place Stadium	18,145	Recap
5	4	Sat, July 8	7:00 p.m. EDT	at Hamilton Tiger-Cats	L 13–21	1–3	TSN/RDS/CBSSN	Tim Hortons Field	21,331	Recap
6	5	Sat, July 15	4:00 p.m. EDT	vs. Winnipeg Blue Bombers	W 31–28 (OT)	2–3	TSN/RDS	TD Place Stadium	18,144	Recap
7	6	Sun, July 23	7:00 p.m. EDT	at Calgary Stampeders	W 43–41 (OT)	3–3	TSN/RDS/CBSSN	McMahon Stadium	21,226	Recap
8	7	Fri, July 28	7:30 p.m. EDT	vs. Hamilton Tiger-Cats	L 12–16	3–4	TSN/RDS	TD Place Stadium	19,243	Recap
9	8	Sun, Aug 6	7:00 p.m. EDT	at Saskatchewan Roughriders	L 24–26	3–5	TSN/RDS2/CBSSN	Mosaic Stadium	26,625	Recap
10	9	Sun, Aug 13	7:00 p.m. EDT	at Toronto Argonauts	L 31–44	3–6	TSN/RDS	BMO Field	12,796	Recap
11	10	Sat, Aug 19	7:00 p.m. EDT	vs. Montreal Alouettes	L 24–25	3–7	TSN/RDS/CBSSN	TD Place Stadium	19,475	Recap
12	11	Sun, Aug 27	7:00 p.m. EDT	at Edmonton Elks	L 20–30	3–8	TSN/RDS/CBSSN	Commonwealth Stadium	23,825	Recap
13	Bye									
14	12	Fri, Sept 8	7:30 p.m. EDT	vs. Hamilton Tiger-Cats	L 24–27	3–9	TSN/RDS2/CBSSN	TD Place Stadium	18,004	Recap
15	13	Sat, Sept 16	7:00 p.m. EDT	at BC Lions	L 37–41	3–10	TSN/RDS2	BC Place	20,403	Recap
16	14	Fri, Sept 22	7:00 p.m. EDT	vs. Saskatchewan Roughriders	W 36–28	4–10	TSN/RDS/CBSSN	TD Place Stadium	19,647	Recap
17	15	Sat, Sept 30	4:00 p.m. EDT	vs. Montreal Alouettes	L 15–32	4–11	TSN/RDS	TD Place Stadium	20,464	Recap
18	16	Mon, Oct 9	1:00 p.m. EDT	at Montreal Alouettes	L 3–29	4–12	TSN/RDS/CBSSN	Molson Stadium	20,664	Recap
19	17	Sat, Oct 14	7:00 p.m. EDT	at Toronto Argonauts	L 27–40	4–13	TSN/RDS2	BMO Field	13,888	Recap
20	Bye									
21	18	Sat, Oct 28	7:00 p.m. EDT	vs. Toronto Argonauts	L 22–27	4–14	TSN/RDS	TD Place Stadium		Recap

# Games played with white uniforms.
# Games played with colour uniforms.
# Games played with alternate uniforms.

== Roster ==
2023 Ottawa Redblacks final roster
**Quarterbacks**: 9 Nick Arbuckle; 18 Dustin Crum; 3 Tyrrell Pigrome; **Running backs**: 45 Anthony Gosselin; 34 Ante Milanovic-Litre; 31 Devonte Williams; **Receivers**: 23 Jaelon Acklin; 0 Bralon Addison; 87 Keaton Bruggeling; 89 Marco Dubois; 1 Shaq Evans; 2 Justin Hardy; 85 Daniel Oladejo; 15 Tevaun Smith	**Offensive linemen**: 64 Dino Boyd T; 55 Drake Centers T; 59 Cyrille Hogan-Saindon C; 54 Jacob Ruby G; 68 Eric Starczala C; 67 Hunter Steward G; **Defensive linemen**: 58 Bryce Carter DE; 90 Cleyon Laing DT; 94 Lorenzo Mauldin DE; 99 Kene Onyeka DE; 47 Nigel Romick DE; 51 Blessman Ta'ala DT; 96 Michael Wakefield DT	**Linebackers**: 32 Adam Auclair; 43 Kevin Francis; 28 Frankie Griffin; 48 Gary Johnson; 42 James Peter; 5 Jovan Santos-Knox; **Defensive backs**: 20 Alonzo Addae; 35 Douglas Coleman; 19 Lucas Cormier; 33 Ty Cranston; 41 Tobias Harris; 21 Justin Howell; 4 Money Hunter; 36 Alijah McGhee; 6 Damon Webb	**Special teams**: 56 Tanner Doll LS; 73 Michael Domagala K; 13 Richie Leone P/K; **Practice roster**: 10 Jake Dunniway QB; 97 Tre Hornbuckle DT; 81 Jon'Vea Johnson WR; 30 Vosean Joseph LB; 69 Lucas Lavin T; 91 Thomas Schaffer DT; 29 Skyler Thomas DB; 16 De'Montre Tuggle RB; 65 Roman Wahrheit T	**Injured list**: 7 Tyrie Adams QB; 24 Hakeem Bailey DB; 27 Sherrod Baltimore DB; 44 Dan Basambombo LB; 80 Nate Behar SB; 22 Jackson Bennett RB; 25 Cariel Brooks DB; 50 Dontae Bull T; 37 Brandin Dandridge DB; 17 DeVonte Dedmon WR; 61 Drew Desjarlais G; 88 Maurice Ffrench WR; 95 Aidan John DE; 14 Abdul Kanneh DB; 38 Deandre Lamont DB; 82 Siaosi Mariner WR; 8 Jeremiah Masoli QB; 52 Zack Pelehos T; 98 Deshawn Stevens DE; 46 Tyron Vrede LB; 10 Lewis Ward K
Italics indicate American player • **Bold** indicates Global player

== Coaching staff ==
Ottawa Redblacks staff
Front office: Owner – Ottawa Sports and Entertainment Group (OSEG); Chief Executive Officer – Mark Goudie; General Manager – Shawn Burke; Assistant General Manager – Jeremy Snyder; Director of Pro Personnel – Brendan Taman; Director of Canadian Scouting & Football Analytics – Chad Hudson; Pro/College Scout – Philippe Moreau; Video Coordinator – Braun Gheller; Head Coaches: Head Coach – Bob Dyce; Assistant Head Coach – Khari Jones; Offensive coaches: Offensive Coordinator – Khari Jones; Offensive Line – Paul Charbonneau; Receivers – Travis Moore; Running Backs – Nate Taylor; Offensive Quality Control – Nadia Doucoure	Defensive coaches: Defensive Coordinator – Barron Miles; Defensive Line and Run Game Coordinator – Mike Phair; Linebackers – Patrick Bourgon; Defensive Backs – Jykine Bradley; Special teams coaches: Special Teams Coach – Cory McDiarmid; Strength and conditioning: Strength and Conditioning Coordinator – Nick Mercuri; → Coaching staff
