= Stefan Ptaszek =

Canadian gridiron football coach (born 1971)

- Ptaszek with the McMaster Marauders in 2026

McMaster Marauders
- Title: Head coach
- CFL status: National

Personal information
- Born: April 15, 1971 (age 55); Burlington, Ontario, Canada
- Listed height: 5 ft 11 in (1.80 m)
- Listed weight: 175 lb (79 kg)

Career information
- Position: Wide receiver
- University: Wilfrid Laurier
- CFL draft: 1994: 1st round, 9th overall pick

Career history

Playing
- 1995–1996: BC Lions
- 1996: Hamilton Tiger-Cats
- 1999–2000: Toronto Argonauts

Coaching
- 2003–2005: Wilfrid Laurier Golden Hawks (OC)
- 2006–2015: McMaster Marauders (HC)
- 2016–2017: Hamilton Tiger-Cats (OC/WR)
- 2018: UBC Thunderbirds (OC)
- 2019–present: McMaster Marauders (HC)

Awards and highlights
- Won 27th Vanier Cup (WR); Won 41st Vanier Cup (OC); Won 47th Vanier Cup (HC); 7× Yates Cup Champion (1991, 2004, 2005, 2011, 2012, 2014, 2019); Frank Tindall Trophy (2012); CIS Coach of the Year (2012); OUA Coach of the Year (2012, 2014); Longest win streak in CIS history (21 games)

Stefan Ptaszek (born April 15, 1971) is the head coach for the McMaster Marauders. He is a Canadian former professional football wide receiver and former offensive coordinator for the Hamilton Tiger-Cats, Wilfrid Laurier Golden Hawks, and UBC Thunderbirds.

== Playing career ==
Collegiately, Ptaszek played CIAU football for the Wilfrid Laurier Golden Hawks. He was named an all-Canadian three times and was part of the 1991 Yates Cup and 27th Vanier Cup championship team. Ptaszek was also named to the Golden Hawks Team of the Century and previously held the school's records for most receiving yards in a career from 1994-2025. As a professional player, he played for four seasons for the BC Lions, Hamilton Tiger-Cats, and Toronto Argonauts of the Canadian Football League.

== Coaching career ==
=== Wilfrid Laurier Golden Hawks ===
Ptaszek served as the offensive coordinator for the Wilfrid Laurier Golden Hawks for three seasons. During that time, he helped his team to win back to back Yates Cups in 2004 and 2005 and the 41st Vanier Cup.

=== McMaster Marauders (first stint) ===
Ptaszek became McMaster's head coach in 2006 and won the school's first Vanier Cup championship in 2011. Ptaszek also coached the Marauders to the longest winning streak in CIS history, winning 21 games in a row spanning over the 2011 and 2012 seasons. In 2012, he was named the CIS Coach of the Year.

=== Hamilton Tiger-Cats ===
On May 5, 2016, Ptaszek was named the offensive coordinator and receivers coach for the Canadian Football League's Hamilton Tiger-Cats.

=== UBC Thunderbirds ===
Ptaszek served as the offensive coordinator for the UBC Thunderbirds for the 2018 season.

=== McMaster Marauders (second stint) ===
On November 28, 2018, Ptaszek was named head coach of the McMaster Marauders. During his first season back, the Marauders finished the 2019 regular season with a record of 6-2, en route to winning the Yates Cup.
