= Mike Lambros =

Canadian football player (born 1949)

Profile
- Position: Linebacker

Personal information
- Born: January 31, 1949 (age 77); Wiarton, Ontario, Canada
- Listed height: 6 ft 1 in (1.85 m)
- Listed weight: 220 lb (100 kg)

Career information
- University: Queen's
- CFL draft: 1972: 1st round, 2nd overall pick

Career history
- 1972–1975: Edmonton Eskimos

Awards and highlights
- Grey Cup champion (1975)

Mike Lambros (born January 31, 1949) is a retired Canadian football player who played for the Edmonton Eskimos of the Canadian Football League (CFL). He played college football at Queen's University.
