= Gary Jeffries =

Canadian gridiron football player and coach (born 1946)

Personal information
- Born: May 13, 1946 (age 80); Toronto, Ontario, Canada

Career information
- University: Guelph; Wilfrid Laurier
- CFL draft: 1972: 5th round, 43rd overall pick

Career history
- 1972–1980: Laurier Golden Hawks (LBC/DLC)
- 1981–1988: Laurier Golden Hawks (DC)
- 1994–2002: Laurier Golden Hawks (DC)
- 2002–2012: Laurier Golden Hawks (HC)
- 2013–2014: McMaster Marauders (Special Teams)
- 2016–2018: Guelph Gryphons (Defence and Special Teams)

Awards and highlights
- CIS Coach of the Year (2003); 4× OUA coach of the Year (2003, 2004, 2005, 2009); Athlete of the Year at the University of Guelph (1967); All star defensive back at WLU (1970); Vanier Cup champion (2005)

Gary Jeffries (born May 13, 1946) is the former head coach for the Wilfrid Laurier Golden Hawks football team, women's basketball team, and men's basketball team. Most prominently, he served as the football team's head coach from 2002 to 2012, winning the CIS Coach of the Year award in 2003 and a Vanier Cup championship in 2005. Jeffries also played baseball in the Detroit Tigers organization from 1966 to 1969.

== University career ==
Jeffries played CIAU football and hockey for the Guelph Gryphons from 1966 to 1968 and football for the Waterloo Lutheran Golden Hawks from 1970 to 1971.

== Coaching career ==
Jeffries began his coaching career in 1972 as the linebackers coach and defensive line coach for the Golden Hawks until his promotion to defensive coordinator in 1981. While serving as the defensive coordinator until 1988, he also served as the Golden Hawks women's basketball coach from 1984 to 1988. He became the men's basketball coach in 1989, holding that position until 1996, while also resigning from his football duties. In 1994, he re-joined the football team as their defensive coordinator and held that position until 2002, when he became the team's interim head coach midway through the season. He won the school's second ever Vanier Cup championship in 2005 against the Saskatchewan Huskies.

On November 1, 2012, it was announced that Jeffries was stepping down as manager of football operations and head coach.

From 2013 to 2014, Jeffries served as the special teams coordinator of the McMaster Marauders. He was then hired by the Guelph Gryphons in 2016 as a defence and special teams coach and served in that capacity for two years.
