= Wayne Boden =

Canadian serial killer (1948–2006)

- Born: Wayne Clifford Boden c. 1948; Dundas, Ontario, Canada
- Died: 27 March 2006 (aged 57–58); Kingston General Hospital, Ontario, Canada
- Other names: The Vampire Rapist; Strangler Bill
- Years active: 1969–1971
- Conviction: Non-capital murder (4 counts)
- Penalty: Life imprisonment

Details
- Victims: 4
- Date apprehended: 19 May 1971

Wayne Clifford Boden (1948 – 27 March 2006) was a Canadian serial killer and rapist active between 1969 and 1971. Boden killed four women, three in Montreal and one in Calgary, earning the nickname The Vampire Rapist for biting the breasts of his victims, and received four life sentences. Boden's was the first murder conviction in North America due to forensic odontological evidence.

== Biography ==
Wayne Clifford Boden was born in 1948 in Dundas, Ontario. He attended Glendale Secondary School in Hamilton in the early to mid-1960s, where he was reportedly quiet, but muscular and played on the school senior football team.

== Murders ==
=== Shirley Audette ===
On 3 October 1969, Shirley Audette was found dead behind an apartment complex in downtown Montreal, Quebec. She had been sexually assaulted and strangled. Investigators noted the absence of defensive injuries, leading some to speculate that she may not have resisted her attacker.

One of Audette’s former boyfriends told police that she had recently been involved with a man he described as dominant and potentially dangerous, although she never identified him by name. On the night of her death, her boyfriend was at work, while a neighbor, Boden, was reported to have encountered Audette outside the building, where she would often sit when feeling uneasy.

=== Marielle Archambault ===
On 23 November, Marielle Archambault, a jewelry clerk, left work at closing time with a young man she introduced to her co-workers as “Bill,” appearing notably happy in his company. When she failed to report for work the following morning, her employer checked on her at her apartment and, together with her landlady, discovered her body on a couch. She was fully clothed, and while the room appeared orderly, evidence indicated she had been sexually assaulted.

During the investigation, police recovered a crumpled photograph from the apartment, which co-workers initially identified as the man known as “Bill.” Although a composite sketch based on the image was circulated, authorities were unable to match it to any suspect. It was later determined that the photograph was actually of Archambault’s deceased father.

=== Jean Way ===
On 17 January 1970, Brian Caulfield, the boyfriend of Jean Way, 24, came to pick her up for a scheduled date at her apartment on Lincoln Street in downtown Montreal. When Way did not answer the door, he decided to come back a little later, but upon returning found the door unlocked. Caulfield found Way's naked body on the bed, with her breasts undamaged. Boden was most likely in Way's apartment when Caulfield was knocking at the door earlier that evening. An autopsy conducted by Dr. Jean-Paul Valcourt found two small fibers under the fingernails of her left hand, indicating that – contrary to prior belief – Way had indeed struggled against Boden.

After Way's death, the resulting publicity from the murders caused a brief mass hysteria in Montreal, although this disappeared as Boden had fled the city and the murders stopped.

=== Elizabeth Anne Porteous ===
In Calgary, Alberta, a 33-year-old high school teacher named Elizabeth Anne Porteous did not report to work on the morning of 18 May 1971. Her apartment manager was called, who found her body on the bedroom floor. As with Marielle Archambault, her apartment showed considerable signs of a struggle, and Porteous had been raped and strangled. Her breasts were likewise mutilated with bite marks. Amid the wreckage, however, the police recovered a broken cufflink under the victim's body. In their investigation of the murder, the police were able to find out from two of her colleagues that she was seen at a stoplight riding in a blue Mercedes-Benz on the night she died; the car was reported as having a distinctive advertising bull-shaped decal in the rear window. A friend of the victim also informed police that she had been recently dating a man named "Bill", described as a "flashy" dresser with neat, short hair.

== Arrest ==
The following day, on 19 May, the blue Mercedes was spotted by patrolmen, parked near the murder scene. Boden, a former fashion model, was arrested half an hour later as he went to his car. He told the police that he moved from Montreal a year previous and admitted that he had been dating Porteous and was with her on the night of the murder. When the broken cufflink was presented to him, he admitted its ownership. However, he insisted that Porteous was fine when he left her that night.

The police in Calgary were in possession of a copy of the photograph recovered from Archambault's apartment and, as Boden resembled the man in the picture, they held him for suspicion in murdering Porteous. Police then turned their attention to the marks on the victim's breasts.

=== Odontological evidence ===
The police contacted Gordon Swann, a local orthodontist, to help prove that the marks on Porteous' breasts and neck were Boden's bite marks, with the intent to verify them as having been left by Boden. As there was nothing in Canadian literature on forensic odontology at the time, Swann wrote to the Federal Bureau of Investigation (FBI) in the United States, hoping for any information on the matter.

Swann received a reply from FBI Director J. Edgar Hoover, who directed him to England, where he met a man who had dealt with 20 or 30 cases regarding bite marks. Swann was able to get the information he needed and based on a cast made of Boden's teeth, he managed to demonstrate 29 points of similarity between the bite marks in Porteous' body and Boden's teeth.

== Conviction ==
The evidence provided by Gordon Swann was sufficient for the jury of Boden's trial to find him guilty for the murder of Elizabeth Porteous and subsequently sentenced to life imprisonment. Boden was the first murderer to be convicted in North America based on odontological evidence. Boden then returned to Montreal to face trial, where he confessed to three murders of Shirley Audette, Marielle Archambault, and Jean Way, and was sentenced to three additional life terms. Boden was sent to the Kingston Penitentiary in Kingston, Ontario, where he began serving his sentence on 16 February 1972. Boden was initially believed to be involved in the death of Norma Vaillancourt, a 21-year-old student killed on 23 July 1968, but denied involvement. In 1994, Raymond Sauve was convicted of Vaillancourt's death and sentenced to ten years in prison.

In 1977, Boden was granted a credit card by American Express five years into his life sentence, which he used while out on a day pass from prison in Laval while eating lunch with his social worker in the Kon Tiki restaurant at the Mount Royal Hotel in downtown Montreal. He went to use the washroom and escaped through the bathroom window. He was recaptured several days later at a bar on Mackay Street in downtown Montreal. Three prison guards were disciplined, and American Express conducted an internal investigation to find out how a prisoner serving a life sentence for murder managed to get a credit card.

== Death ==
Boden died from skin cancer at Kingston General Hospital on 27 March 2006 after being confined in the hospital for six weeks.

== See also ==
- List of serial killers by country
