= 1972 CFL draft =

Canadian football draft

The 1972 CFL draft composed of nine rounds where 70 Canadian football players that were chosen exclusively from eligible Canadian universities. The Montreal Alouettes, who had the worst record in the Eastern Conference in the previous season, had the first overall selection.

== 1st round ==
1. Montreal Alouettes Larry Smith RB Bishop's

2. Edmonton Eskimos Mike Lambros LB Queen's

3. British Columbia Lions Steve Szapka G Simon Fraser

4. Hamilton Tiger-Cats Tom Walker FB Waterloo Lutheran

5. Montreal Alouettes Peter Paliotti WR Loyola

6. Hamilton Tiger-Cats John Harris T York

7. Hamilton Tiger-Cats Mike O'Shaughnessy DE McMaster

8. Toronto Argonauts Rick Chevers LB Waterloo

9. Calgary Stampeders Don Moulton DB Calgary

== 2nd round ==
10. Montreal Alouettes Alexander Baptist LB Bishop's

11. Winnipeg Blue Bombers Bruce Miatello T McMaster

12. Toronto Argonauts Stewart Francis LB Simon Fraser

13. Calgary Stampeders John Konihowski WR Saskatchewan

14. Calgary Stampeders Bill Hogan WR Waterloo Lutheran

15. Winnipeg Blue Bombers Jon Dellandrea T Toronto

16. Saskatchewan Roughriders Bob Toogood DE Manitoba

17. Toronto Argonauts Bill Turnbull DB Waterloo Lutheran

18. Calgary Stampeders Bob Bayter DB McMaster

== 3rd round ==
19. Montreal Alouettes Rick Kaupp DB New Brunswick

20. Edmonton Eskimos Glen Colwill TB Simon Fraser

21. British Columbia Lions Bob Friend DB Simon Fraser

22. Ottawa Rough Riders Doug Cihoki E Western Ontario

23. Winnipeg Blue Bombers Rein Enno C Toronto

24. Hamilton Tiger-Cats Jim Chalkley FB McMaster

25. Saskatchewan Roughriders Joe Watt T McMaster

26. Toronto Argonauts John Buda T Waterloo

27. Calgary Stampeders Jeff Owen T Windsor

== 4th round ==
28. Montreal Alouettes Jim Leone G St. Francis Xavier

29. Edmonton Eskimos Roy Beechey WR Alberta

30. British Columbia Lions Art Lestins T Waterloo Lutheran

31. Ottawa Rough Riders Stew MacSween DB Toronto

32. Winnipeg Blue Bombers John Morash DT Windsor

33. Hamilton Tiger-Cats Jerry Mays WR McMaster

34. Saskatchewan Roughriders Jim Cooper DB Waterloo Lutheran

35. Toronto Argonauts Mike Urban QB Windsor

36. Calgary Stampeders Don Westlake TB Guelph

== 5th round ==
37. Montreal Alouettes Mike Tanner DB Dalhousie

38. Edmonton Eskimos Barry St. George WR Ottawa

39. British Columbia Lions Bill MacDonald QB Bishop's

40. Ottawa Rough Riders Ron Perowne TB Bishop's

41. Winnipeg Blue Bombers Jamie Horne LB Manitoba

42. Hamilton Tiger-Cats Dan Smith QB Ottawa

43. Toronto Argonauts Gary Jeffries DB Waterloo Lutheran

44. Calgary Stampeders Paul Knill DB Western Ontario

== 6th round ==
45. Montreal Alouettes Dave Scharman G Waterloo Lutheran

46. Edmonton Eskimos Dave Syme QB Simon Fraser

47. British Columbia Lions Jean Gouin T Ottawa

48. Ottawa Rough Riders Gordon Ladbrook LB Dalhousie

49. Winnipeg Blue Bombers Mario Nardone DT Carleton

50. Hamilton Tiger-Cats Mark Drexler DE Western Ontario

51. Hamilton Tiger-Cats Mark Baldosoro HB McMaster

52. Toronto Argonauts Rick Henderson G Waterloo Lutheran

53. Calgary Stampeders William Lockington QB McMaster

== 7th round ==
54. Montreal Alouettes John Danaher DE New Brunswick

55. Edmonton Eskimos Bud Coupland WR Calgary

56. British Columbia Lions Wayne Terry DB Ottawa

57. Ottawa Rough Riders Fred Tokaryk DT Dalhousie

58. Winnipeg Blue Bombers Mark Millen DE Manitoba

59. Hamilton Tiger-Cats Rick Wiedenhoeft DB Waterloo

60. Toronto Argonauts Doug Ball HB Toronto

61. Calgary Stampeders Frank Belvedere HB Loyola

== 8th round ==
62. Montreal Alouettes Ian Purcell DB Simon Fraser

63. Edmonton Eskimos Jerry Simpson DB Dalhousie

64. British Columbia Lions Ron Warner G British Columbia

65. Winnipeg Blue Bombers Bill Thompson DE Queen's

66. Calgary Stampeders Scott Henderson C Calgary

== 9th round ==
67. Montreal Alouettes Larry Rodenbush C Brandon

68. Montreal Alouettes William Beaton G Carleton

69. Winnipeg Blue Bombers Doug Cozac HB Queen's

70. Calgary Stampeders Rick Coleman DT Calgary
