= Ed Kucy =

Canadian football player (born 1971)

No. 53, 56
- Position: Offensive lineman

Personal information
- Born: October 19, 1971 (age 55); Edmonton, Alberta, Canada
- Listed height: 6 ft 5 in (1.96 m)
- Listed weight: 295 lb (134 kg)

Career information
- High school: Archbishop O'Leary (Edmonton)
- CJFL: Edmonton Wildcats
- College: Arizona (1991–1993)
- CFL draft: 1994: 4th round, 35th overall pick

Career history
- 1994–1995: Winnipeg Blue Bombers
- 1995–1996: Edmonton Eskimos
- 1997: Hamilton Tiger-Cats*
- * Offseason or practice squad member only

Ed Paul Kucy (born October 19, 1971) is a Canadian former professional football offensive lineman who played three seasons in the Canadian Football League (CFL) with the Winnipeg Blue Bombers and Edmonton Eskimos. Kucy was selected by the Blue Bombers in the fourth round of the 1994 CFL draft after playing college football at the University of Arizona.

== Early life ==
Ed Paul Kucy was born on October 19, 1971, in Edmonton, Alberta. He attended Archbishop O'Leary High School in Edmonton, graduating in 1989. He then played for the Edmonton Wildcats of the Canadian Junior Football League. According to the Arizona Daily Star, Kucy was also a "Canadian powerlifting gold medalist" in 1990.

== College career ==
Kucy was a member of the Arizona Wildcats of the University of Arizona from 1991 to 1993. He was redshirted in 1991 after suffering a knee injury. On August 13, 1992, during Kucy's first practice of the year after returning from his knee injury, he stepped onto the playing field with an ice pack on his knee. This caused assistant coach Jim Young to yell out "Ice pack!!?? Ice pack!!??" Young then sent Kucy to the other end of the field, where the scout team was practicing. Kucy played very sparingly during the 1992 season and did not earn a varsity letter. He was a letterman in 1993. Kucy was on the honor roll in 1994. He also won an award for "outstanding community leadership". Kucy graduated from the University of Arizona with a degree in ecology and evolutionary biology in May 1997.

== Professional career ==
Kucy was selected by the Winnipeg Blue Bombers in the fourth round, with the 35th overall pick, of the 1994 CFL draft. He officially signed with the team in May 1994. He played in five games for the Blue Bombers during the 1994 season. He started a few games towards the end of the season after David Black suffered an injury. Kucy then started the first seven games of the 1995 season before suffering a season-ending fractured kneecap. He was released by the Blue Bombers in early September 1995 after electing not to join their practice roster.

Kucy was signed to the practice roster of his hometown Edmonton Eskimos in September 1995. He became a starter for the Eskimos in 1996. He played in all 18 games for the Eskimos during the 1996 season, recording two fumble recoveries and one tackle. He also spent time as the long snapper on extra points and field goals. The Eskimos finished the season with an 11–7 record and lost to the Toronto Argonauts in the 84th Grey Cup by a score of 43–37.

In June 1997, Kucy was traded to the Hamilton Tiger-Cats for future considerations. He was cut before the start of the season in favor of Colin Quiney. Kucy declined a practice roster offer from Hamilton although he soon changed his mind. However, Hamilton did not sign him.

== Personal life ==
Kucy's brother Joe Kucy also played football. Ed's daughter Stephanie played basketball at Lees–McRae College and his son Ryan Kucy plays baseball at St. Bonaventure University.
