= Jason MacGougan =

Canadian gridiron football player (born 2002)

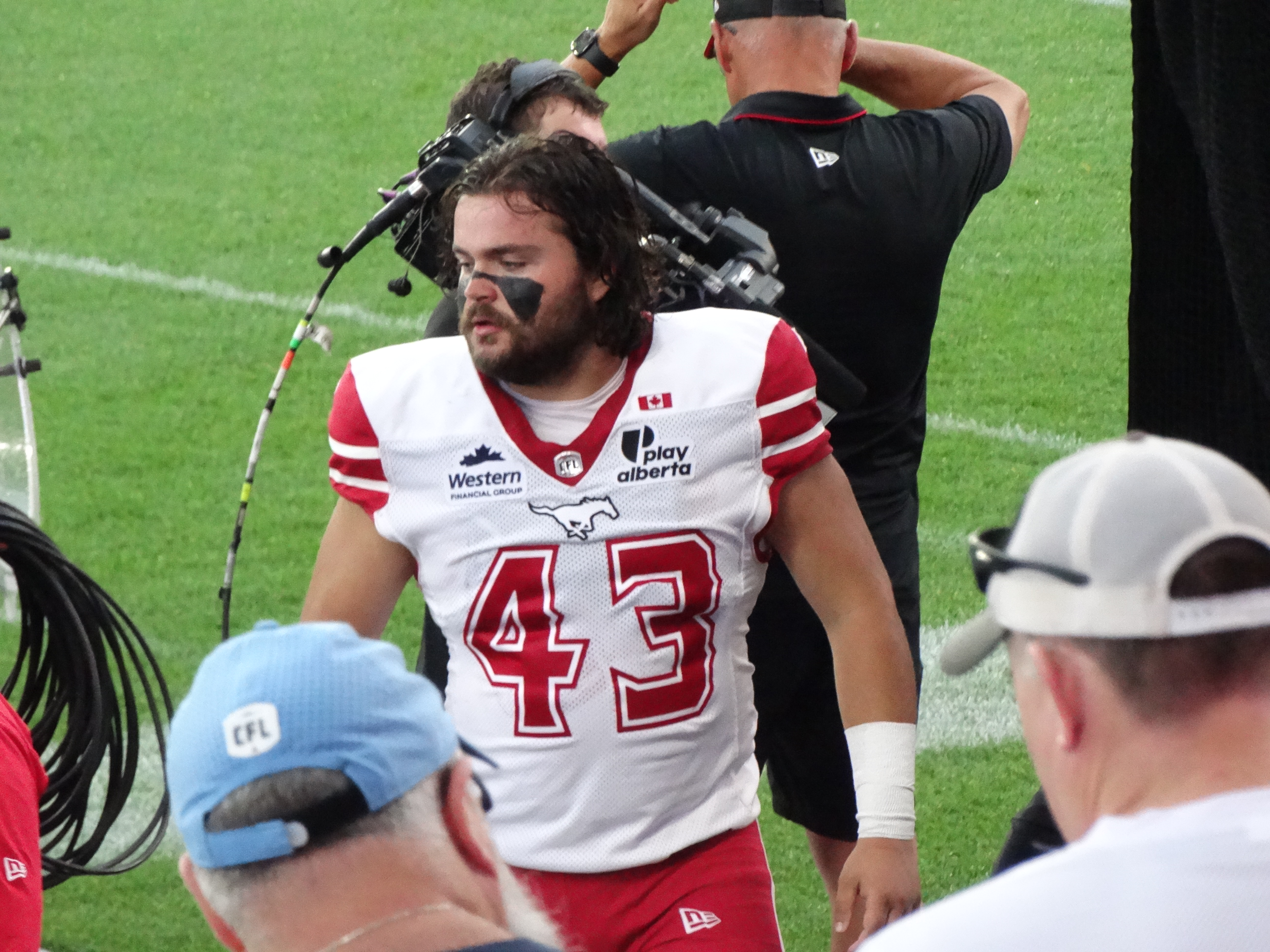
- MacGougan with the Calgary Stampeders in 2026

No. 43 – Calgary Stampeders
- Position: Long snapper
- Roster status: Active
- CFL status: National

Personal information
- Born: August 8, 2002 (age 24)
- Listed height: 6 ft 0 in (1.83 m)
- Listed weight: 228 lb (103 kg)

Career information
- High school: M. M. Robinson (Burlington, Ontario)
- University: Wilfrid Laurier (2020–2024)
- CFL draft: 2025: undrafted

Career history
- Calgary Stampeders (2025–present)

Awards and highlights
- Yates Cup champion (2024)
- Stats at CFL.ca

Jason MacGougan (born August 8, 2002) is a Canadian professional football long snapper for the Calgary Stampeders of the Canadian Football League (CFL). He played U Sports football for the Wilfrid Laurier Golden Hawks.

== University career ==
MacGougan played U Sports football for the Wilfrid Laurier Golden Hawks from 2020 to 2024. After the 2020 season was cancelled, he played in 37 games for the Golden Hawks, recording three solo tackles and eight assisted tackles. In his final year of eligibility in 2024, MacGougan was a member of the Yates Cup winning squad.

== Professional career ==
After going undrafted in the 2025 CFL draft, MacGougan signed with the Calgary Stampeders. On June 1, 2025, he was released as part of final roster cut downs. On June 17, 2025, MacGougan re-signed with the Stampeders following an injury to starter, Aaron Crawford. He made his CFL debut on June 21, against the Ottawa Redblacks. MacGougan played in 16 games his rookie season, including the Western Semi-Final against the BC Lions.
