= Daniel Oladejo =

Canadian gridiron football player (born 1999)

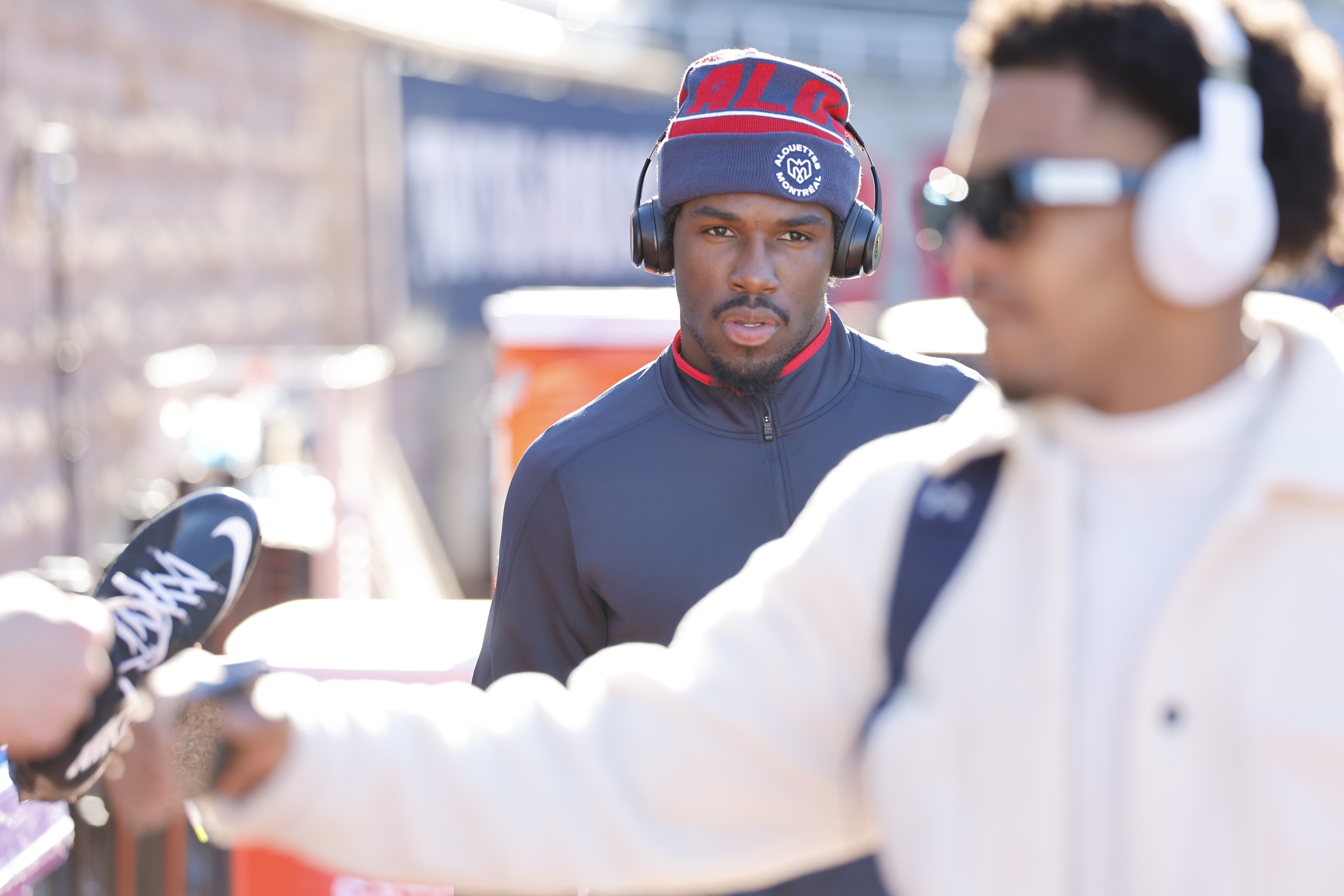
- Oladejo in 2024

Profile
- Position: Wide receiver

Personal information
- Born: September 13, 1999 (age 27); Nigeria
- Listed height: 6 ft 0 in (1.83 m)
- Listed weight: 185 lb (84 kg)

Career information
- High school: Colonel By Secondary
- University: Ottawa
- CFL draft: 2023: 2nd round, 17th overall pick

Career history
- Ottawa Redblacks (2023–2024); Montreal Alouettes (2024–2025); Winnipeg Blue Bombers (2026)*
- * Offseason or practice squad member only
- Stats at CFL.ca

Daniel Oladejo (born September 13, 1999) is a Canadian professional football wide receiver.

== University career ==
Oladejo played U Sports football for the Ottawa Gee-Gees from 2017 to 2022. He did not play in 2020 due to the cancelled 2020 U Sports football season, but he played in 23 games where he had 63 receptions for 781 yards and six touchdowns. While at the University of Ottawa, Oladejo was named an OUA Second Team All Star (2022), uOttawa Most Outstanding Offensive Player (2022), uOttawa President's Award Winner (2020), and was a 2x USports Academic All Canadian (2020-21, 2021-22).

After being invited to the 2023 CFL National Combine in Edmonton, Alberta, Oladejo had a highly successful performance. He put up 20 reps on the bench press, 1st amongst receivers, ran a 4.19 second short shuttle, 1st amongst receivers and 4th overall, and was a standout in practice sessions and one on ones. He was named one of CFL reporter Marshall Ferguson's three stars on Day Two of practices and was singled out as Coaches' Pick on Day Five.

== Professional career ==
Pre-draft measurables
Height	Weight	40-yard dash	20-yard shuttle	Three-cone drill	Vertical jump	Broad jump	Bench press
5 ft 10 1/8 in (1.78 m)	192 lb (87 kg)	4.81 s	4.19 s	7.28 s	34.0 in (0.86 m)	9 ft 5 3/8 in (2.88 m)	20 reps
All values from CFL Combine

=== Ottawa Redblacks ===
Oladejo was drafted in the second round, 17th overall, by the Ottawa Redblacks in the 2023 CFL draft and signed with the team on May 9, 2023. Following training camp in 2023, he accepted a spot on the team's practice roster to begin the season. He remained on the practice roster for most of the season, but dressed in the final regular season game on October 28, 2023, against the Toronto Argonauts, where he had one reception for 14 yards.

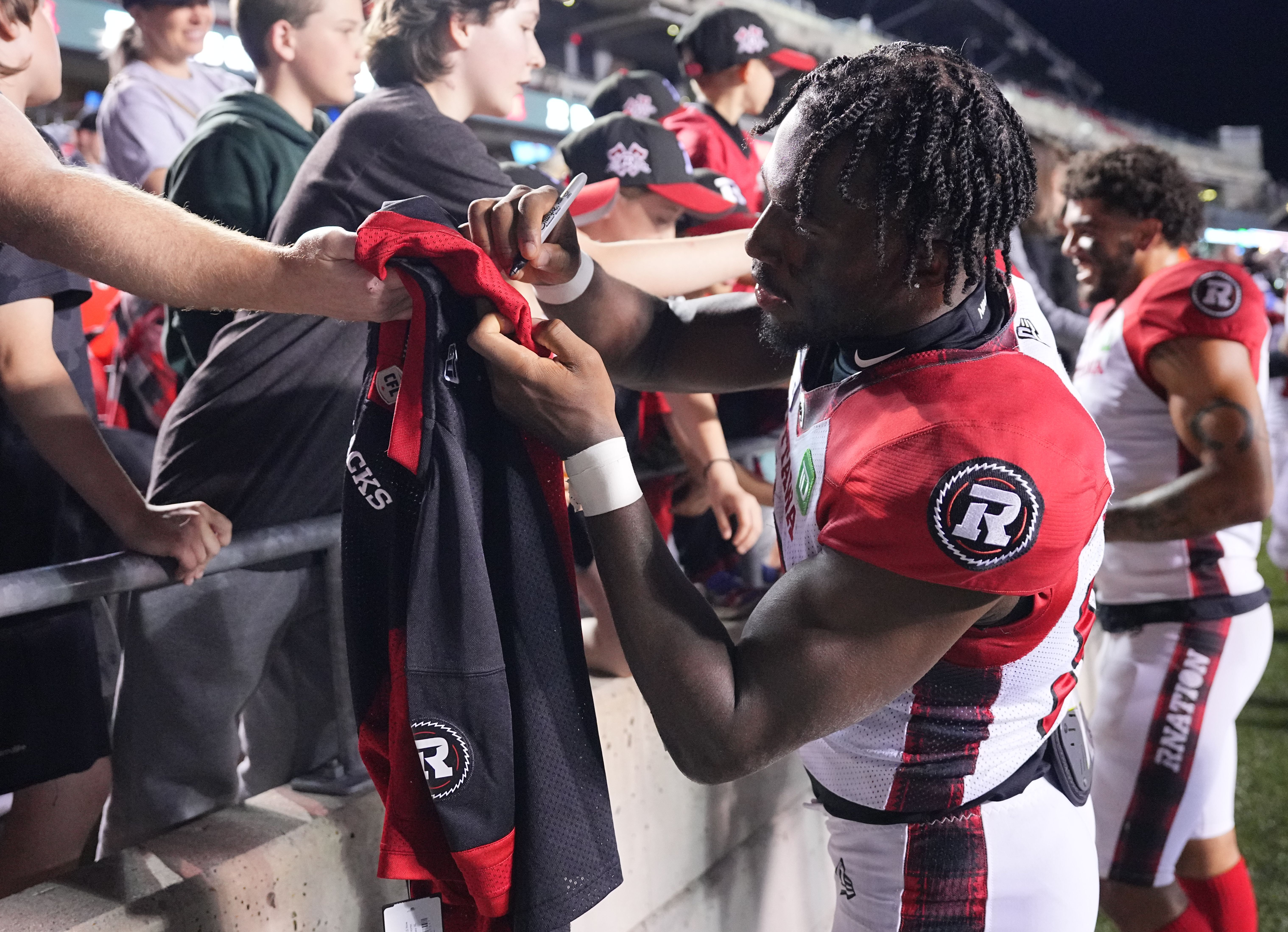
Daniel Oladejo Signing Fan Jersey REDBLACKS

In 2024, Oladejo made the team's opening day active roster as a backup receiver. He played in 14 regular season games, while intermittently being placed on the practice roster in the back half of the season, where he recorded three catches for 24 yards. He was placed on the practice roster for the team's East Semi-Final loss to the Argonauts and his contract expired on the day after the team's season ended, on November 3, 2024.

=== Montreal Alouettes ===
On November 5, 2024, Oladejo signed a practice roster agreement with the Montreal Alouettes. After his team lost a playoff game to the Argonauts for the second week in row, Oladejo's practice roster contract expired and he became a free agent on November 10, 2024. However, he was re-signed by the Alouettes on November 26, 2024. On May 4, 2026, Oladejo was released by the Alouettes.

=== Winnipeg Blue Bombers ===
On May 31, 2026, Oladejo was signed to the practice roster of the Winnipeg Blue Bombers.. He was released on June 23.
