= Devonte Williams =

American gridiron football player (born 1997)

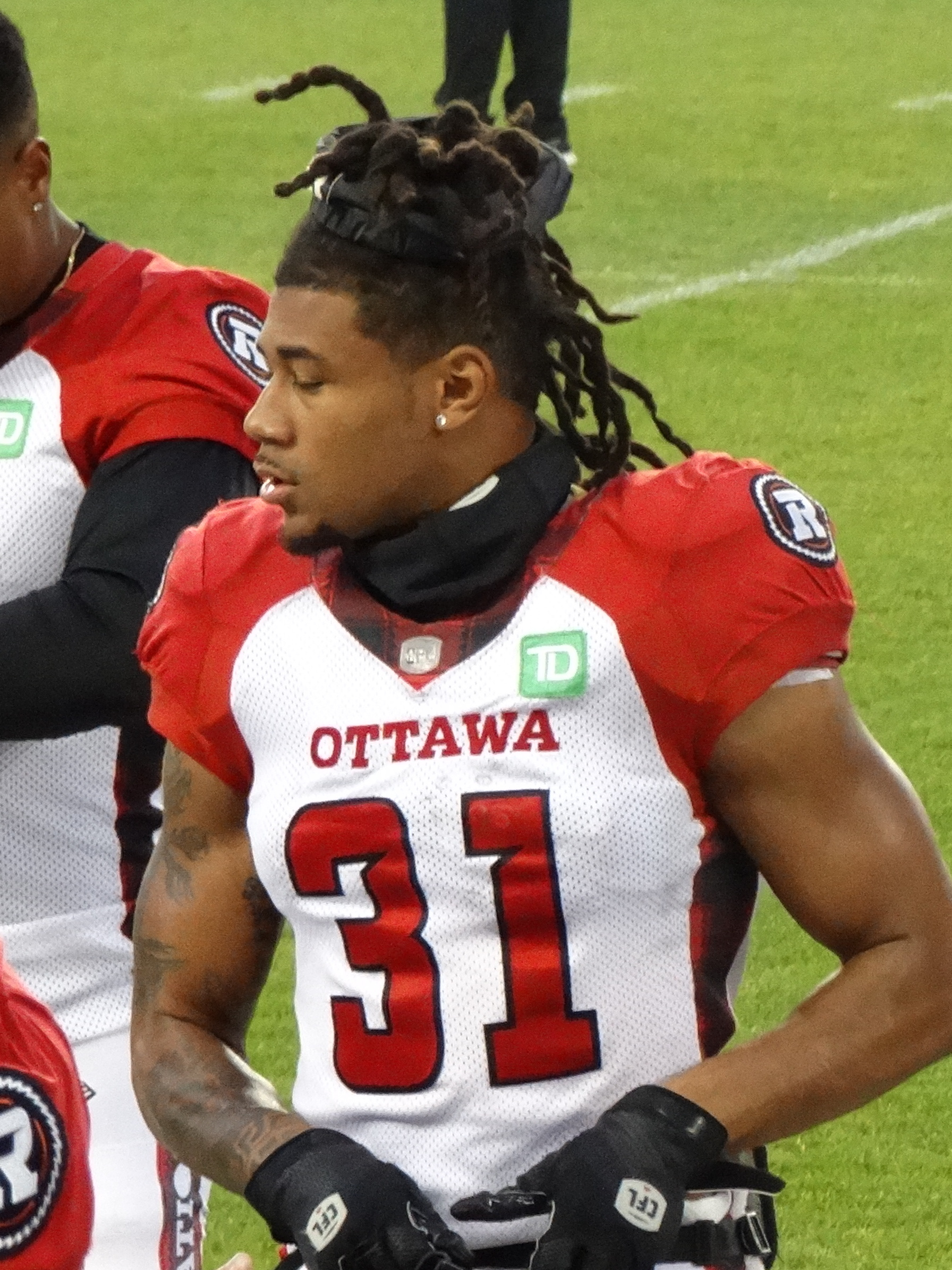
- Williams with the Ottawa Redblacks in 2023

No. 31
- Position: Running back

Personal information
- Born: February 5, 1997 (age 29); Columbia, Maryland, U. S.
- Listed height: 5 ft 9 in (1.75 m)
- Listed weight: 170 lb (77 kg)

Career information
- High school: Bullis School
- College: Southeastern Louisiana; Indiana
- NFL draft: 2020: undrafted

Career history
- 2021: Winnipeg Blue Bombers*
- 2022–2024: Ottawa Redblacks
- * Offseason or practice squad member only
- Stats at CFL.ca

Devonte Williams (born February 5, 1997) is an American former professional football running back who played for the Ottawa Redblacks of the Canadian Football League (CFL). Currently playing for the Dallas Cowboys

== College career ==
Williams first played college football for the Indiana Hoosiers in 2015 as a cornerback, where he played and started in three games before suffering a season-ending injury. He used a medical redshirt year in 2015 and returned to his position of running back in 2016 and 2017.

He then transferred to Southeastern Louisiana University to play for the Lions in 2018 and 2019, where he played in 23 games and had 222 carries for 892 yards and 12 touchdowns.

== Professional career ==
=== Winnipeg Blue Bombers ===
After not playing in 2020 due to the COVID-19 pandemic, Williams signed with the Winnipeg Blue Bombers on July 13, 2021. Following training camp, he began the season on the practice roster and was eventually released on September 30, 2021.

=== Ottawa Redblacks ===
On April 20, 2022, it was announced that Williams had signed with the Ottawa Redblacks. After the team's incumbent starting running back, William Powell, suffered an injury in training camp, Williams was named the opening day starter. He made his professional debut on June 10, 2022, against the Winnipeg Blue Bombers, where he had nine carries for 33 yards. He started in the first two games of the regular season before relinquishing his position to Powell and Williams was assigned to the practice roster. Following another injury to Powell, Williams returned and played in six more regular season games and totalled 90 carries for 454 yards and 27 receptions for 159 yards for the year. At the end of the year, he was named the Redblacks' nominee for the CFL's Most Outstanding Rookie Award.

After the Redblacks decided not to re-sign Powell, Williams became the starting running back for the 2023 season. He scored his first career touchdown on a 23-yard run in a game against the Edmonton Elks on August 27, 2023. He retired on April 23, 2025.

== Personal life ==
Williams' was born to parents Harmony and Isaac Williams. Williams' uncles, Shawn Springs and Omar Evans, also played professional football in the National Football League and Canadian Football League, respectively. Williams' grandfather, Ron Springs, played at running back for the Dallas Cowboys and Tampa Bay Buccaneers.
