= Glendale Secondary School =

Location
- 145 Rainbow Dr. Hamilton, Ontario, L8K 4G1; Canada; 43.225188°N 79.779325°W

Information
- School type: Public Secondary School
- Motto: Ad Excellentiam (English: Towards Excellence)
- Established: 1959
- School board: Hamilton-Wentworth District School Board
- Superintendent: Simon Goodacre
- Area trustee: Todd White
- Principal: Theresa Sgambato
- Grades: 9, 10, 11, 12
- Age range: 13-18
- Enrolment: 1200
- Hours in school day: 6.5
- Campus type: Urban
- Colour: Orange Black
- Song: G.S.S.
- Sports: Football, Soccer, Basketball, Rowing, Volleyball, Cross Country, Track & Field
- Mascot: Glennie the Bear
- Nickname: Bears
- Team name: Glendale Bears
- Website: hwdsb.on.ca/glendale

Glendale Secondary School is located at 145 Rainbow Drive in Hamilton, Ontario. The school was founded in 1959 and is a part of the Hamilton-Wentworth District School Board. The school is located close to the Hamilton suburb of Stoney Creek, Ontario and services students from there as well as the East Hamilton Region.

== Overview ==
There are more than 1200 students enrolled at Glendale from dozens of language and cultural groups.

Glendale has a full range of co-curricular activities in athletics and clubs, including basketball and football.

Glendale Secondary School has enjoyed a strong enrolment in the Audition Based Program of the Arts for over 15 years.

== Glendale's Special Olympics ==
Along with several programs and courses provided throughout Glendale, the Secondary school also provides an annual Special Olympics event which aims to provide Thames Valley students with developmental disabilities the ability to participate in an athletic event hosted at the TD Waterhouse Stadium.

== Audition Based Program of the Arts (ABPA) ==
The ABPA program at Glendale Secondary offers immersive, specialized training in dance, drama, music (instrumental/popular), vocals, visual/media arts, and production, with students in the program taking a minimum of two arts courses per year. Every year, Glendale hosts an end-of-year musical, performed by students in the ABPA program, receiving widespread critical acclaim.

== In popular culture ==
The movie Detention starring Dolph Lundgren was shot at Glendale during the summer of 2002. The film portrayed the school as an inner-city school and focused on its position as a central location involved in the distribution of hard drugs.

== Alumni ==
- Ian Astbury Lead singer of the 1980s rock band The Cult
- Wayne Boden, serial killer
- Milan Borjan, goalkeeper for Canada men's national soccer team
- Rudy Florio player and coach, went on with an eight-year career in the CFL
- Rob Hitchcock, football player
- Larry Jusdanis, NCAA, U Sports and CFL football player
- Rade Opačić Professional Kickboxer
- Miroslav Čabrilo NCAA, USL and CSL Soccer Player
- Stefan Vukovic Former Professional Soccer Player

== See also ==
- Education in Ontario
- List of secondary schools in Ontario
