= Taylor Elgersma =

Canadian gridiron football player (born 2002)

- Elgersma with the Winnipeg Blue Bombers in 2026

No. 13 – Winnipeg Blue Bombers
- Position: Quarterback
- Roster status: Active
- CFL status: National

Personal information
- Born: March 27, 2002 (age 24); London, Ontario, Canada
- Listed height: 6 ft 5 in (1.96 m)
- Listed weight: 240 lb (109 kg)

Career information
- High school: Oakridge (London, Ontario)
- University: Wilfrid Laurier (2020–2024)
- NFL draft: 2025: undrafted
- CFL draft: 2025: 2nd round, 18th overall pick

Career history
- Green Bay Packers (2025)*; Birmingham Stallions (2026)*; Winnipeg Blue Bombers (2026–present)
- * Offseason or practice squad member only

Awards and highlights
- Lois and Doug Mitchell Award (2025); Hec Crighton Trophy (2024); First-team All-Canadian (2024); Second-team All-Canadian (2023); Larry Haylor Award (OUA MVP) (2023, 2024)

Taylor Elgersma (born March 27, 2002) is a Canadian professional football quarterback for the Winnipeg Blue Bombers of the Canadian Football League (CFL). He played U Sports football for the Wilfrid Laurier Golden Hawks, where he won the Hec Crighton Trophy in 2024 as U Sports' most outstanding football player and the Lois and Doug Mitchell Award as U Sports' top male university athlete.

== Early life ==
Elgersma was born in London, Ontario, and attended Oakridge Secondary School, where he played high school football. He also played ice hockey for the London Jr Knights from 2016 to 2019. He attended Wilfrid Laurier University where he represented their varsity football team and also pursued a bachelor's degree in Kinesiology.

== University career ==
Elgersma first committed to playing U Sports football for the Wilfrid Laurier Golden Hawks in 2020, but did not play that year due to the cancelled 2020 season. In 2021, he served as the backup quarterback where he played in five games and completed 24 of 38 passes for 355 yards and one passing touchdown. The Golden Hawks finished with a 3–3 record in a shortened season where they had a first-round playoff loss to the Guelph Gryphons.

Elgersma became the starting quarterback in 2022 where he played in eight regular season games and two post-season games where he completed 178 out of 270 pass attempts for 2,141 yards with 15 touchdown passes and nine interceptions. The Golden Hawks finished in fourth place in the OUA and hosted a quarter-final playoff game where he won his first playoff start in the game against the Carleton Ravens, completing 21 of 28 passes for 303 yards and two touchdowns. In the semi-final against the Western Mustangs, Elgersma struggled as he completed just eight of 17 pass attempts for 52 yards and one interception as the Golden Hawks lost 45–9.

In the 2023 season, Elgersma led the country in passing yards and completions as he recorded 206 completions out of 274 pass attempts for 2,641 yards with 18 touchdown passes and four interceptions in eight regular season games. The Golden Hawks finished in second place in the OUA with a 7–1 record and Elgersma led the team to playoff victories over the Waterloo Warriors and Windsor Lancers to qualify for the program's first Yates Cup game since 2016. In the 2023 Yates Cup, Elgersma completed 27 of 43 pass attempts for 242 yards with one touchdown pass and two picks as Laurier had their season ended by Western for the second consecutive season. At the end-of-season awards night, Elgersma was named a U Sports Second Team All-Canadian at quarterback.

In 2024, Elgersma played in all eight regular season games where he completed 178 of 239 pass attempts (74.5% completion rate) for 2,643 yards with 20 touchdowns and nine interceptions. He led the Golden Hawks to an 8–0 record where the team finished in first place in the OUA for the first time since 2005. In the Yates Cup, Elgersma completed 18 of 30 passes for 306 yards and four touchdown passes as he was named the game's MVP in the championship win over the Western Mustangs. In the following week, in the Uteck Bowl, he set a bowl game record for most passing yards in a game with 452 yards while throwing five touchdown passes in the victory over the Bishop's Gaiters. Elgersma was named the Uteck Bowl's offensive player of the game as the Golden Hawks qualified for their first Vanier Cup game since 2005. In the 59th Vanier Cup game, Elgersma completed 23 of 34 pass attempts for 246 yards and two touchdowns, but the Golden Hawks suffered their first loss of the season to the Laval Rouge et Or by a score of 22–17.

At the end of the season, Elgersma was named the OUA MVP and won the Hec Crighton Trophy as the most outstanding player in U Sports football. He was also named a U Sports First Team All-Canadian.

After completing his fourth year of playing eligibility, with one year remaining, Elgersma qualified to be selected in the 2025 CFL draft. In the winter edition of the CFL Scouting Bureau rankings for players eligible in the that draft, he was ranked as the 20th-best player available and the ninth-best U Sports player available. Elgersma also accepted an invitation to play in the 2025 Senior Bowl, becoming the second U Sports player to ever be invited to play in the game. On June 2, 2025, he was awarded the Lois and Doug Mitchell Award as U Sports top male university athlete for the 2024–25 season.

=== University statistics ===
Season	Team	Games	Passing							Rushing			
Season	Team	GP	Comp	Att	Pct	Yards	Avg	TD	Int	Att	Yards	Avg	TD
2020	Laurier	Season cancelled due to COVID-19											
2021	Laurier	7	48	87	55.2	672	7.7	3	5	11	53	4.8	0
2022	Laurier	10	178	270	65.9	2,141	7.9	15	9	32	125	3.9	1
2023	Laurier	11	274	367	74.7	3,482	9.5	25	8	35	182	5.2	10
2024	Laurier	12	275	374	73.5	4,011	10.7	34	10	44	229	5.2	6
Career		40	775	1,098	70.6	10,306	9.1	77	32	122	589	4.8	17

== Professional career ==
Pre-draft measurables
Height	Weight	Arm length	Hand span	Wingspan	20-yard shuttle	Three-cone drill	Vertical jump	Broad jump
6 ft 5 in (1.96 m)	227 lb (103 kg)	32 1/8 in (0.82 m)	9 5/8 in (0.24 m)	6 ft 5 3/8 in (1.97 m)	4.89 s	7.95 s	25.0 in (0.64 m)	8 ft 9 in (2.67 m)
All values from Pro Day

Elgersma went undrafted the 2025 NFL draft but was ranked the #14 best prospect ahead of the 2025 CFL draft, where he was drafted in the second round (18th overall) by the Winnipeg Blue Bombers.

=== Green Bay Packers ===
On May 12, 2025, Elgersma signed with the Green Bay Packers after a tryout at rookie minicamp. He was released on August 26 as part of final roster cuts.

=== Attempt to sign with the Birmingham Stallions ===
On January 12, 2026, Elgersma was selected by the Birmingham Stallions in the 2026 UFL draft. On February 19, 2026, Elgersma accepted an invite to the 2026 NFL Scouting Combine. Elgersma will not run any drills himself but will throw the ball to other positions. He is the second U Sports quarterback ever invited to the combine, after Larry Jusdanis of the Acadia Axemen attended in 1995. Stallions head coach A. J. McCarron confirmed the report but said he expects Elgersma to still play with Birmingham for the 2026 UFL season.

The United States government failed to process a P visa for Elgersma in time for the season opener, which prevented him from formally joining the team's active roster. He was able to participate in team practices with the Stallions, but could not be paid for his time or participate in any games. Due to the US federal government partial shutdown, there was no timetable for when Elgersma would be cleared to play. McCarron personally sought the intervention of Alabama Senator Tommy Tuberville, a former football coach himself, in hopes of having the visa processed. By April 15, McCarron had exhausted all of his legal options and abandoned his efforts to sign Elgersma, directing all further comment to the league office, as Elgersma agreed to pursue a CFL contract.

=== Winnipeg Blue Bombers ===
On April 16, 2026, it was announced that Elgersma had signed a three-year rookie contract with the Winnipeg Blue Bombers of the Canadian Football League.
