= Scott Brady (Canadian football) =

Canadian gridiron football coach (born 1987)

Mount Allison Mounties
- Title: Head coach

Personal information
- Born: May 13, 1987 (age 39)
- Listed height: 5 ft 7 in (1.70 m)
- Listed weight: 220 lb (100 kg)

Career information
- Position: Wide receiver (No. 37)
- High school: Iroquois Ridge High; White Oaks Secondary
- University: Mount Allison
- CFL draft: 2010: undrafted

Career history
- 2010: Mount Allison Mounties (Defensive backs coach) (Special teams coach)
- 2011–2015: Mount Allison Mounties (Defensive coordinator)
- 2016–2017: Mount Allison Mounties (Head coach)
- 2018–2024: McMaster Marauders (Defensive coordinator)
- 2019–2024: McMaster Marauders (Assistant head coach)
- 2025–present: Mount Allison Mounties (Head coach)

Scott Brady (born May 13, 1987) is the head coach for Mount Allison University's football team, the Mount Allison Mounties.

== Early life ==
Brady played high school football at White Oaks Secondary before transferring to Iroquois Ridge High.

== University career ==
Brady played CIS football as a running back and receiver for the Mount Allison Mounties from 2006 to 2009.

== Coaching career ==
=== Mount Allison Mounties (first stint) ===
Despite having one year of playing eligibility remaining, Brady joined the coaching staff of the Mounties for the 2010 season where he coached on the opposite side of ball as a defensive backs and special teams coach. In the following season, he was named defensive coordinator and served in that role for five seasons. Notably, the Mounties allowed 344 points in his first season to allowing 64 in his fourth, in 2014. In his time as defensive coordinator, the Mounties made the playoffs in four of five seasons while finishing in first place twice and winning two Loney Bowl championships.

In November 2015, Brady was named head coach of the Mounties following the departure of incumbent head coach, Kelly Jeffrey. In his first season as head coach, the Mounties finished in second place with a 3–5 record and defeated the Acadia Axemen in the semi-final before losing to the St. Francis Xavier X-Men in the Loney Bowl. In 2017, Brady led the Mounties to an improved 4–4 record, but finished in fourth place due to tie-breakers and did not qualify for the playoffs. On November 30, 2017, Brady announced his resignation as the team's head coach.

=== McMaster Marauders ===
On December 7, 2017, it was announced that Brady had joined the McMaster Marauders as the team's defensive coordinator. In 2019, he added the title of assistant head coach. That year, the Marauders finished in second place with a 6–2 record and defeated the Western Mustangs in the Yates Cup final. While the Marauders were routinely near the top in terms of lowest points against, the offence struggled and the Marauders only qualified for the playoffs once in the following four years.

=== Mount Allison Mounties (second stint) ===
On May 8, 2025, Brady was announced as the head coach for the Mount Allison Mounties for the second time and returned after an eight-year absence. In 2025, the Mounties finished with a second consecutive 1–7 record and out of the playoffs.

== Head coaching record ==
Year	Conference	Standing	Playoffs	Bowl
Mount Allison Mounties (AUS) (2016–2017, 2025–present)
2016	3–5	2nd	1–1	L Loney
2017	4–4	4th	—	
2025	1–7	5th	–	
Total:	8–16		1–1	
