= 1994 CFL draft =

Canadian football draft

The 1994 CFL draft composed of six rounds and 49 Canadian football players that were chosen from eligible Canadian universities as well as Canadian players playing in the NCAA.

== Supplemental Selections ==
= CFL Division All-Star	= CFL All-Star	= Hall of Famer

Pick #	CFL team	Player	Position	School
1	Hamilton Tiger-Cats	Val St. Germain	OL	McGill
2	Saskatchewan Roughriders	Chris Burns	T	Portland State
3	Calgary Stampeders	Vince Danielsen	WR	British Columbia
4	Winnipeg Blue Bombers	Ryan Carey	DB	Acadia

== Round one ==
= CFL Division All-Star	= CFL All-Star	= Hall of Famer

Pick #	CFL team	Player	Position	School
5	Ottawa Rough Riders	Tony Bailey	DE	Saint Mary's
6	BC Lions	Trevor Shaw	WR	Weber State
7	Ottawa	Rod Murphy	LB	Idaho State
8	Calgary	John Kalin	QB/DB	Calgary
9	BC Lions	Stefan Ptaszek	WR	Wilfrid Laurier
10	Saskatchewan	Matthiew Quiviger	T	McGill
11	Calgary	Ed Philion	DL	Ferris State
12	Winnipeg	Mitch Berger	P/K	Colorado
13	Edmonton Eskimos	Rob Wessling	T	Guelph

== Round two ==
= CFL Division All-Star	= CFL All-Star	= Hall of Famer

Pick #	CFL team	Player	Position	School
14	Toronto Argonauts	Claudio Berton	FB	Lehigh
15	Ottawa	Mike Malott	TB	Waterloo
16	Hamilton	Jeremy Braitenback	WR	Saskatchewan
17	BC	Mike Morreale	WR	McMaster
18	Saskatchewan	Andrew Greene	OL	Indiana
19	Calgary	Phil Yeboah-Kodie	LB	Penn State
20	Winnipeg	Ken Browne	OL	Colorado
21	Edmonton	Pat McNerney	TE/OL	Weber State

== Round three ==
Pick #	CFL team	Player	Position	School
22	Toronto	Mike Campbell	OL	Idaho State
23	Ottawa	Glenn McCausland	WR	Toronto
24	Hamilton	Ainsworth Morgan	WR	Toledo
25	BC	Mike Bromilow	DT	Simon Fraser
26	Calgary	Ken Rayner	OL	Weber State
27	Calgary	Craig Brenner	SB/FB	Wilfrid Laurier
28	Hamilton	Tim Tindale	FB	Western Ontario
29	Edmonton	Darryl Fridd	DL	Alberta

== Round four ==
= CFL Division All-Star	= CFL All-Star	= Hall of Famer

Pick #	CFL team	Player	Position	School
30	Toronto	Dave Irwin	WR	Guelph
31	Ottawa	Obie Spanic	DT	Weber State
32	Hamilton	Chris Harris	CB	Simon Fraser
33	Saskatchewan	Andrew Walters	DB	British Columbia
34	Calgary	Jay McNeil	OL	Kent State
35	Winnipeg	Ed Kucy	G	Arizona
36	Edmonton	Brad Zacharias	TB	Acadia

== Round five ==
Pick #	CFL team	Player	Position	School
37	Toronto	Jamie Bennett	DT	Fresno State
38	Hamilton	Michael Chevers	LB	Wilfrid Laurier
39	BC	Paul Blackwood	FB	Cincinnati
40	Saskatchewan	Tony Tighe	OL	Edinboro
41	Calgary	Roger Reinson	LB	Calgary
42	Winnipeg	Kevin Robson	OL	North Dakota
43	Edmonton	Stephen Day	LB	Alberta

== Round six ==
Pick #	CFL team	Player	Position	School
44	Toronto	Norm Casola	WR	Windsor
45	Hamilton	Geoff Nichol	LB	Colgate
46	BC	Paul Zuccato	LB	Simon Fraser
47	Saskatchewan	Paul Kozan	TB	Queen's
48	Calgary	Cooper Harris	LB	Pittsburg State
49	Winnipeg	Scott Mitchell	QB	Toronto
