= Mount Allison Mounties football =

U Sports football team

Mount Allison Mounties
- Mount Allison Mounties logo
- First season: 1955; 71 years ago
- Athletic director: Jacques Bellefleur
- Head coach: Scott Brady; 4th year, 9–23–0 (.281)
- Other staff: Kelly Jeffrey (OC); Zak Colangelo (DC)
- Field: Alumni Field
- Stadium capacity: 2,500
- Stadium surface: Field Turf
- Location: Sackville, New Brunswick
- League: U Sports
- Conference: AUS (1955–present)
- Past associations: NBFL (1949–1957); MIFL (1958–1959); AFC (1960–1965); MIAA (1966–1968); AIAA (1969–1973); AUAA (1974–1998); Atlantic University Sport (1999–present)
- All-time record: 181–235–0 (.435)
- Postseason record: –

Titles
- Vanier Cups: 0
- Atlantic Bowls: 2; 1984, 1991
- Jewett Trophies: 6; 1984, 1985, 1991, 1997, 2013, 2014
- Hec Crighton winners: 2 Éric Lapointe (2)
- Colours: Garnet and Gold
- Website: mountiepride.ca/fball

The Mount Allison Mounties football team represents Mount Allison University in Sackville, New Brunswick in the sport of Canadian football in U Sports. The Mounties program has been in continuous operation since 1955 when they played an exhibition schedule and then officially joined the New Brunswick Football League (NBFL) in 1956. The football team was an inaugural member of the Maritime Intercollegiate Football League (MIFL), which was a precursor to the current sporting association, Atlantic University Sport.

The team has twice appeared in the Vanier Cup, once in 1984, and again in 1991, losing both times. The Mounties have won six conference championships in 14 appearances, including four straight from 2013 to 2016. Only one Mounties player has won the Hec Crighton Trophy, Canadian Football Hall of Fame member, Éric Lapointe, who won the award twice and has since had his number retired by the program.

== Recent history ==
In June 2008, Kelly Jeffrey was named interim head coach for the 2008 season and led the Mounties to a berth in the playoffs for only the second time in the new millennium. Under his tutelage, quarterback Kelly Hughes was named the AUS Most Valuable Player. After this season, Jeffrey was named full-time head coach.

2009 saw the Mounties go 0–8, but Gary Ross was named AUS MVP, the first time since 1991 and 1992 (Grant Keaney) that Mounties were named MVPs in back-to-back years. 2010 was the resurgence of the Mounties, led by second-year quarterback Jake Hotchkiss, who that year became the second Mountie quarterback under Jeffrey to be named an AUS All-Star. The Mounties went 4–4 and hosted the AUS Semi-Final for the first time, which was also the first home playoff game since 1998. Jeffrey was named the AUS Coach Of the Year, the first Mountie to receive this honour since John MacNeil in 1996.

The Mounties finished second in the AUS conference in 2010 and hosted their first home playoff game (conference semi-finals) since the new millennium. Another 0–8 season in 2011 was followed up by a successful 2012 which had the Mounties in the playoffs again, and boasted the AUS leading rusher (Jordan Botel) and the emergence of a new leader at quarterback, freshman Brandon Leyh. The 3–5 Mounties also experienced an offence without either Gary Ross or Adam Molnar, as this was the first season without one of the two star receivers in the lineup.

In 2013, the Mounties won the Loney Bowl for the first time since 1997. They followed up that campaign with their first undefeated season in the AUS, posting an 8–0 record en route to their second consecutive Jewett Trophy championship. In 2015, the Mounties finished in first place in the AUS regular season with a 5–3 record and hosted the Loney Bowl for the second consecutive season. They were also looking to win their third consecutive Jewett Trophy but would end up falling short to the St. Francis Xavier X-Men 24–18.

2016 would be the first season with Scott Brady as the team's new head coach, who had been with the team as an assistant coach since 2010. Brady was the first permanent head coach in the program's recent history who was both a Mount Allison graduate and former player for the Mounties. The team ended up making the playoffs as the second place team. They would defeat the Acadia Axemen 27–18 to compete in their fourth straight Loney Bowl but would end up losing to the St. Francis Xavier X-Men 29–8. In 2017, the team would see their five-year playoff streak come to an end as they missed the playoffs for the first time since 2011.

Following a coaching change, with Peter Fraser as the team's new head coach, the team would regress further with a 2–6 record. In 2019, Mount Allison brought in former CFL player and Acadia Axemen alumnus Kyle Graves to take over as Offensive Coordinator. The team lost their first four games of the season, but then won their next three and eventually finished with a 3–5 record and enough to qualify for the playoffs but fell short in the first round to the Bishop's Gaiters in their second year in the AUS conference. Following the season, Graves left the team to be closer to his family.

Following the cancellation of the 2020 season due to the ongoing COVID-19 pandemic, the Mounties saw a significant increase in their performance. They brought in recently retired CFL offensive linemen and Mountie Alumnus Mike Filer to act as Run Game Coordinator and Offensive Line Coach. However, Filer’s coaching career was ended when he decided to come out of retirement to return to the CFL for the 2021 season and Coach Fraser took over Offensive Coordinator duties.

During the 2021 U Sports football season, the team was able to put up their best record since 2014 with 5 wins and a single loss in the shortened regular season. The defensive unit led by perennial AUS All-Star defensive back Lucas Cormier and AUS Defensive MVP Daniel Bell, was ranked as the best in the Nation in most statistical categories. In contrast the Mounties Offence was ranked last nationally in all categories. In the post-season, the team fell short to the Bishop's Gaiters in the first round of the AUS playoff for the second-consecutive season.

In 2022, the Mounties had an up and down season finishing with a record of 4-4. Again, the defence was dominant in most statistical categories ending in the top 5 of all statistical categories. The post-season would prove to be much different for the Mounties squad as they were able to defeat their recent nemesis the Bishop's Gaiters in Lennoxville, Quebec bringing them to the Loney Bowl for the first time since 2016. However, the team was unable to defeat the AUS powerhouse St. Francis Xavier X-Men thus ending their season.

Following this defeat in the AUS Championship, the Mounties have seen a dramatic decline in their performance with the graduation of many of their key contributors to their previously dominant defence. In 2023, the Mounties record fell to 3-5 and failed to defeat the Gaiters in the first round of the AUS playoff.

In 2024, the Mounties had their worst season since 2009 finishing with a record of 1-7 and failing to make the playoffs for the first time since 2017. In the following offseason, head coach Peter Fraser resigned on March 10, 2025.

On May 8, 2025, Scott Brady returned as the Mounties' head coach, having previously served in the role in 2016 and 2017. On July 10, 2025, another former head coach, Kelly Jeffrey, joined the staff as the team's offensive coordinator.

== Recent regular season results ==
Season	Games	Won	Lost	Ties	PCT	PF	PA	Standing	Playoffs
2000	8	1	7	0	0.125	100	236	4th in AUS	Out of playoffs
2001	8	1	7	0	0.125	47	330	4th in AUS	Out of playoffs
2002	8	1	7	0	0.125	60	334	4th in AUS	Out of playoffs
2003	8	0	8	0	0.000	66	279	4th in AUS	Out of playoffs
2004	8	0	8	0	0.000	64	248	4th in AUS	Out of playoffs
2005	8	0	8	0	0.000	23	379	4th in AUS	Out of playoffs
2006	7	2	5	0	0.286	132	225	4th in AUS	Lost to Acadia Axemen in semi-final 16–6
2007	8	1	7	0	0.125	199	295	4th in AUS	Out of playoffs
2008	8	2	6	0	0.250	189	272	3rd in AUS	Lost to St. Francis Xavier X-Men in semi-final 52–12
2009	8	0	8	0	0.000	124	348	4th in AUS	Out of playoffs
2010	8	4	4	0	0.500	157	196	2nd in AUS	Lost to Acadia Axemen in semi-final 22–14 (5OT)
2011	8	0	8	0	0.000	146	344	4th in AUS	Out of playoffs
2012	8	3	5	0	0.375	141	250	3rd in AUS	Lost to Saint Mary's Huskies in semi-final 49–11
2013	8	4	4	0	0.500	166	215	2nd in AUS	Defeated Acadia Axemen in semi-final 19–10; Defeated Saint Mary's Huskies in Loney Bowl 20–17; Lost to Laval Rouge et Or in Uteck Bowl 48–21
2014	8	8	0	0	1.000	234	64	1st in AUS	Defeated St. Francis Xavier X-Men in Loney Bowl 29–7; Lost to McMaster Marauders in Mitchell Bowl 24–12
2015	8	5	3	0	0.625	221	144	1st in AUS	Lost to St. Francis Xavier X-Men in Loney Bowl 24–18
2016	8	3	5	0	0.375	157	238	2nd in AUS	Defeated Acadia Axemen in semi-final 27–18; Lost to St. Francis Xavier X-Men in Loney Bowl 29–8
2017	8	4	4	0	0.500	235	211	4th in AUS	Out of playoffs
2018	8	2	6	0	0.250	162	223	4th in AUS	Out of playoffs
2019	8	3	5	0	0.375	194	161	3rd in AUS	Lost to Bishop's Gaiters in semi-final 28–18
2020	Season cancelled due to COVID-19 pandemic.								
2021	6	5	1	–	0.833	94	61	2nd in AUS	Lost to Bishop's Gaiters in semi-final 23–5
2022	8	4	4	0	0.500	98	144	3rd in AUS	Defeated Bishop's Gaiters in semi-final 15–12; Lost to St. Francis Xavier X-Men in Loney Bowl 21–14
2023	8	3	5	0	0.375	100	176	3rd in AUS	Lost to Bishop's Gaiters in semi-final 34–15
2024	8	1	7	0	0.125	92	269	5th in AUS	Out of playoffs
2025	8	1	7	0	0.125	75	285	5th in AUS	Out of playoffs
2026	8	1	7	0	0.125	111	266	4th in AUS	Out of playoffs

== National postseason results ==
Vanier Cup Era (1965–present)
Year	Game	Opponent	Result
1984	Atlantic Bowl; Vanier Cup	Queen's; Guelph	W 33–11; L 13–22
1985	Atlantic Bowl	Western	L 3–34
1991	Atlantic Bowl; Vanier Cup	Saskatchewan; Wilfrid Laurier	W 31–14; L 18–25
1997	Atlantic Bowl	UBC	L 29–34
2013	Uteck Bowl	Laval	L 21–48
2014	Mitchell Bowl	McMaster	L 12–24

Mount Allison is 2–4 in national semi-final games and 0–2 in the Vanier Cup.

== Head coaches ==
Name	Years	Notes
Unknown	1955–1956	
Gus MacFarlane	1957–1970	
John Wheelock	1971–1976	
Bill Goodwin	1977	
Doug Mitchell	1978–1982	
Steve Bruno	1983–1988	
Jacques Dussault	1989–1990	
Marc Loranger	1990–1996	
Gord Grace	1997–1999	
Robert Kitchen	2000–2001	
Peter Comeau (interim)	2001	
Scott Fawcett	2002–2004	
Steve Lalonde	2005–2007	
Kelly Jeffrey	2008–2015	
Scott Brady	2016–2017	
Peter Fraser	2018–2024	
Scott Brady	2025–present	

== Mounties in the professional ranks ==
As of the start of the 2026 CFL season, two former Mountie players were on CFL teams' rosters:

- Daniel Bell, Hamilton Tiger-Cats
- Lucas Cormier, Ottawa Redblacks

Former Mountie player (1991–93) and assistant coach (1994–97) Ted Goveia held the post of General Manager with the Hamilton Tiger-Cats until his death in 2025.

== Notable athletes ==
- Rick Black (’63) played fullback and was drafted in the first round of the CFL draft by the Ottawa Rough Riders.
- Philippe Girard (’98) was a force to be reckoned with defensively for the Mounties, patrolling the secondary from his defensive back position. A league All-Star and All-Canadian in 1996 and 1997, Girard was also a nominee for the President's Trophy as the country's Most Outstanding Defensive Player in 1997, winning the Atlantic Conference's honour in that category. The following spring, in the 1998 Canadian Football League's (CFL) Canadian College Draft, he became the highest-drafted Mountie ever, going in the first round 5th overall to the Edmonton Eskimos. He played there for several seasons before joining former Mountie teammate Éric Lapointe as a member of Montreal Alouettes, retiring as a member of the Alouettes.
- Eric Lapointe (’00) represents more than just records and statistics, although he dominated both areas of the sport during his four years as a Mountie. He was looked to by his teammates for on-field and locker-room inspiration, and he did not disappoint. Drafted by the Edmonton Eskimos, Lapointe ended up with the Hamilton Tiger-Cats in 1999 where he rushed for 691 yards during the season, helping his team to the Grey Cup in which he was the game's leading ground gainer. Traded to Toronto, he ultimately ended his career with his hometown Montreal Alouettes. In his final season he was the starting running back in the Grey Cup game. Eric retired with the Alouettes in 2006 after their Grey Cup loss to the BC Lions. In 2012, he was inducted into the Canadian Football Hall of Fame for his career as a Mountie.
- Gary Ross (’11) The football team’s most valuable player in recent years, Ross had an unprecedented football season in 2009, breaking several school and conference records along the way. Leading the league in most of the special teams and receiving categories, the five-foot-nine Ross was selected as the Atlantic University Sport (AUS) conference’s MVP and was a strong nominee for the nation’s most outstanding player award — the Hec Crighton Trophy. While he narrowly missed this honour he was still recognized with two All-Canadian awards for the second consecutive season. A four-time AUS Player of the Week, he was named both as a first-team Canadian Interuniversity Sport (CIS) All-Canadian inside receiver, and a second-team CIS All-Canadian return specialist. He led the Atlantic conference in receptions (60), receiving yards (818 yards), receiving touchdowns (four), and all-purpose yards (1,423 yards). He has been an all-star receiver and the conference’s top special teams player in each of his four years at Mount Allison, and is now the AUS career leader in receptions (172), receiving yards (2,582), and all-purpose yards (5,990 yards). This season he was the only Atlantic conference player to average over 100 yards receiving per game (102.2 yards per game) and his 60 receptions are also a new AUS single-season record, smashing the previous mark of 48. His 818 receiving yards are a new Mounties’ single-season school record and the fourth highest total in league history. He currently ranks second in AUS history with 1,679 career punt return yards and 1,403 career kickoff return yards.
- John Reardon ('97) Canadian all-star player for Mount Allison who became an actor for television and film.
