= Laurier Golden Hawks football =

University Canadian football team

Wilfrid Laurier Golden Hawks
- Wilfrid Laurier Golden Hawks logo
- First season: 1961
- Athletic director: Kate McCrae Bristol (administrator)
- Head coach: Todd Galloway; 1st year, 4–4 (.500)
- Other staff: Ron VanMoerkerke (Associate head coach)
- Home stadium: University Stadium
- Field: Knight-Newbrough Field
- Year built: 1958
- Stadium capacity: 6,500
- Stadium surface: FieldTurf
- Location: Waterloo, Ontario
- League: U Sports
- Conference: OUA (1980-present)
- Past associations: OIFC (1963-1966); CCIFC (1967-1970); OUAA (1971-1973); OQIFC (1974-1979)
- All-time record: 321–152–7 (.676)
- Postseason record: 48–46 (.511)

Titles
- Vanier Cups: 2; 1991, 2005
- Uteck Bowls: 2; 2005, 2024
- Churchill Bowls: 1; 1991
- Atlantic Bowls: 2; 1968, 1972
- Yates Cups: 9; 1972, 1973, 1978, 1987, 1991, 2004, 2005, 2016, 2024
- Hec Crighton winners: 3 Bill Kubas, Taylor Elgersma, Ethan Jordan

Current uniform
- Colours: Purple and Gold
- Outfitter: Adidas
- Rivals: Waterloo Warriors; Western Mustangs
- Website: laurierathletics.com

The Laurier Golden Hawks football team represents Wilfrid Laurier University in Waterloo, Ontario in the sport of Canadian football in the Ontario University Athletics conference of U Sports. The Golden Hawks football team has been in continuous operation since 1961 and has been playing U Sports football (since renamed) in every year since 1962. The team has appeared in five Vanier Cup championships, losing in 1966, 1968 and 1972, and winning the national title in 1991 and 2005. The team has also won nine Yates Cup conference championships, most recently in 2024. The Golden Hawks have had three Hec Crighton Trophy winners, Bill Kubas in 1994, Taylor Elgersma in 2024, and Ethan Jordan in 2025.

== Recent history ==
=== Gary Jeffries era ===
Following the resignation of Rick Zmich, Gary Jeffries was appointed the team's manager of football operations and head coach on April 25, 2003, after also serving parts of the 2002 season as the acting head coach. After a 1–7 record in 2002, Jeffries led the Golden Hawks to a 6–2 record and a Yates Cup loss to the McMaster Marauders in his first year as head coach in 2003 where he was awarded the Frank Tindall Trophy as CIS football's head coach of the year.

In 2004, the Golden Hawks finished with an undefeated 8–0 record, which was the first time that the team had a perfect regular season record since the 1966 squad went 7–0. That year notably featured Laurier defeating the McMaster Marauders in the regular season, ending that program's 39-game regular season unbeaten streak. The Golden Hawks won their sixth Yates Cup championship by defeating those same Marauders, but lost the Uteck Bowl to the Laval Rouge et Or.

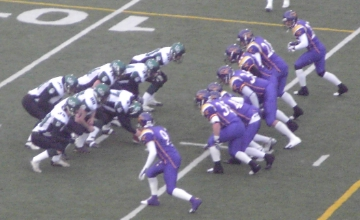
The Saskatchewan Huskies vs. the Golden Hawks at the 2005 Vanier Cup.

The Golden Hawks followed up their strong 2004 campaign with another 8–0 season in 2005, which was the first time that Laurier had back-to-back perfect regular season records. The team defeated the Western Mustangs in the Yates Cup to win the program's seventh conference championship and also claimed victory over the Acadia Axemen in the Uteck Bowl to qualify for their fifth Vanier Cup appearance. In the 41st Vanier Cup, the Golden Hawks defeated the Saskatchewan Huskies 24–23 after placekicker Brian Devlin connected on a 32-yard field goal with 19 seconds remaining in the game. The Golden Hawks became the first team in program history and the 10th team in Canadian University history to finish a season with an undefeated record, going 12–0. The Vanier Cup win was the second and the most recent in program history.

Overall, under Jeffries, the program was one of the strongest in the OUA, as they had always finished in the top three in the ten-team conference from 2003 to 2009. The Golden Hawks had seven straight seasons of at least six wins between 2003 and 2009, but had back-to-back .500 seasons in 2010 and 2011. While the team had a four win season in 2010, they forfeited a game they won against the Toronto Varsity Blues for using an ineligible player. The Golden Hawks finished with a losing record in 2012 for the first time since Jeffries had taken over as head coach.

Jeffries announced his resignation as the manager of football operations and head coach on November 1, 2012, leaving the program with the second-most wins as football coach in school history. Overall, he had compiled a regular season record of 58 wins and 22 losses as well as an 11–9 record in the post-season.

=== Michael Faulds era ===
Former Mustangs quarterback Michael Faulds was hired as the team's head coach, the sixth in program history, on January 8, 2013. In Faulds' first season in 2013, the Golden Hawks missed the playoffs for the first time since 2002, but rebounded with a sixth-place finish, a 4–4 record, and a playoff berth in both the 2014 and 2015 seasons.

In 2016, the Golden Hawks finished with a dominant 7–1 record, losing only to the Western Mustangs who also finished 7–1, which was their best record since 2007. That year, the team won the program's eighth Yates Cup by defeating the Mustangs 43–40 in the 109th Yates Cup game, which was also the largest fourth quarter comeback in Yates Cup history as the Golden Hawks trailed 40–19 early in the fourth quarter. While the team lost the Uteck Bowl to the Laval Rouge et Or, Faulds was named the U Sports Head Coach of the Year and four Golden Hawks were named U Sports All-Canadians.

Building on the success of the 2016 season, the Golden Hawks finished with a 6–2 record in 2017 and a second consecutive second-place finish in the regular season. While the team qualified for the Yates Cup again, the team was hammered by the eventual Vanier Cup champion Western Mustangs by a score of 75–32. In 2018, the team finished with a 4–4 record and a seventh-place finish after losing the tie-breaker with the Waterloo Warriors, whom they had lost to earlier in the season for the first time since 2002. The 2019 season ended much the same as the team finished with a 4–4 record, but lost the last game of the season and finished in seventh place due to tie-breakers with Waterloo and Carleton.

Faulds resigned from his position as head coach in January 2026 to become head coach for the rival Western Mustangs. Former Laurier receiver and offensive coordinator, Todd Galloway, was named head coach on January 15, 2026.

== Recent season-by-season record ==
The following is the record of the Laurier Golden Hawks football team since 1999:

Season	Games	Won	Lost	Pct %	PF	PA	Standing	Playoffs
1999	8	6	2	0.750	273	138	2nd in OUA	Defeated McMaster Marauders in semi-final 42–27; Lost to Waterloo Warriors in Yates Cup 32–20
2000	8	7	1	0.875	274	143	2nd in OUA	Defeated Western Mustangs in semi-final 30–6; Lost to McMaster Marauders in Yates Cup 48–23
2001	8	3	5	0.375	104	138	6th in OUA	Lost to Queen's Gaels in quarter-final 29–27
2002	8	1	7	0.125	150	137	9th in OUA	Did not qualify
2003	8	6	2	0.750	313	158	3rd in OUA	Defeated Ottawa Gee-Gees in quarter-final 38–17; Defeated Queen's Golden Gaels in semi-final 36–33; Lost to McMaster Marauders in Yates Cup 41–15
2004	8	8	0	1.000	343	142	1st in OUA	Defeated Ottawa Gee-Gees in semi-final 46–7; Defeated McMaster Marauders in Yates Cup 31–19; Lost to Laval Rouge et Or in Uteck Bowl 30–11
2005	8	8	0	1.000	330	114	1st in OUA	Defeated McMaster Marauders in semi-final 43–21; Defeated Western Mustangs in Yates Cup 29–11; Defeated Acadia Axemen in Uteck Bowl 31–10; Defeated Saskatchewan Huskies in 41st Vanier Cup 24–23
2006	8	6	2	0.750	253	142	2nd in OUA	Defeated Windsor Lancers in quarter-final 38–29; Defeated Western Mustangs in semi-final 20–15; Lost to Ottawa Gee-Gees in Yates Cup 32–14
2007	8	7	1	0.875	278	124	2nd in OUA	Lost to Guelph Gryphons in semi-final 38–31
2008	8	6	2	0.750	235	191	3rd in OUA	Defeated McMaster Marauders in quarter-final 29–0; Lost to Western Mustangs in semi-final 36–28
2009	8	6	2	0.750	210	136	2nd in OUA	Lost to Western Mustangs in semi-final 26–16
2010	8	4	4	0.500	250	172	4th in OUA	Defeated Guelph Gryphons in quarter-final 42–10; Lost to Ottawa Gee-Gees in semi-final 32–31
2011	8	4	4	0.500	290	194	6th in OUA	Lost to Queen's Gaels in quarter-final 14–10
2012	8	3	5	0.375	109	229	6th in OUA	Lost to Queen's Gaels in quarter-final 34–0
2013	8	1	7	0.125	176	230	9th in OUA	Did not qualify
2014	8	4	4	0.500	277	198	6th in OUA	Lost to Western Mustangs in quarter-final 25–10
2015	8	4	4	0.500	261	218	6th in OUA	Defeated McMaster Marauders in quarter-final 29–15; Lost to Western Mustangs in semi-final 32–18
2016	8	7	1	0.875	341	126	2nd in OUA	Defeated McMaster Marauders in semi-final 21–17; Defeated Western Mustangs in Yates Cup 43–40; Lost to Laval Rouge et Or in Uteck Bowl 36–6
2017	8	6	2	0.750	308	175	2nd in OUA	Defeated McMaster Marauders in quarter-final 19–6; Lost to Western Mustangs in semi-final 75–32
2018	8	4	4	0.500	248	222	7th in OUA	Did not qualify
2019	8	4	4	0.500	260	203	7th in OUA	Did not qualify
2020	Season cancelled due to COVID-19 pandemic							
2021	6	3	3	0.500	127	122	2nd in OUA West	Lost to Guelph Gryphons in quarter-final 31–18
2022	8	5	3	0.625	235	164	4th in OUA	Defeated Carleton Ravens in quarter-final 41–13; Lost to Western Mustangs in semi-final 45–9
2023	8	7	1	0.875	282	154	2nd in OUA	Defeated Waterloo Warriors in quarter-final 69-0; Defeated Windsor Lancers in semi-final 21–14; Lost to Western Mustangs in Yates Cup 29–14
2024	8	8	0	1.000	306	180	1st in OUA	Defeated Queen's Gaels in semi-final 29–21; Defeated Western Mustangs in Yates Cup 51–31; Defeated Bishop's Gaiters in Uteck Bowl 48–24; Lost to Laval Rouge et Or in 59th Vanier Cup 22–17
2025	8	8	0	1.000	355	158	1st in OUA	Defeated Guelph Gryphons in semi-final 37–30; Lost to Queen's Gaels in Yates Cup 30–27
2026	8	4	4	0.500	294	214	7th in OUA	Lost to Western Mustangs in quarter-final 58–41

== National postseason results ==
Vanier Cup Era (1965-current)
Year	Game	Opponent	Result
1966	Vanier Cup	St. FX	L 14-40
1968	Atlantic Bowl Vanier Cup	Saint Mary's Queen's	W 37-7 L 14-42
1972	Atlantic Bowl Vanier Cup	Saint Mary's Alberta	W 50-17 L 7-20
1973	Atlantic Bowl	Saint Mary's	L 17-19
1978	Churchill Bowl	UBC	L 16-25
1987	Churchill Bowl	UBC	L 31-33
1991	Churchill Bowl Vanier Cup	Queen's Mount Allison	W 42-22 W 25-18
2004	Uteck Bowl	Laval	L 11-30
2005	Uteck Bowl Vanier Cup	Acadia Saskatchewan	W 31-10 W 24-23
2016	Uteck Bowl	Laval	L 6-36
2024	Uteck Bowl Vanier Cup	Bishop's Laval	W 48-24 L 17-22

Laurier is 5-5 in national semifinal games and 2-4 in the Vanier Cup.

== Head coaches ==
Name	Years	Notes
Bob Celeri	1961–1965	
Tuffy Knight	1966–1983	
Rich Newbrough	1984–1993	
Rick Zmich	1993–2001	
Gary Jeffries	2002–2012	
Michael Faulds	2013–2025	
Todd Galloway	2026–present	

== National award winners ==
- Hec Crighton Trophy: Bill Kubas (1994), Taylor Elgersma (2024), Ethan Jordan (2025)
- J. P. Metras Trophy: Veron Stiliadis (1988), Scott Evans (2007)
- Presidents' Trophy: Rich Payne (1980)
- Peter Gorman Trophy: Jim Reid (1976), Paul Nastasiuk (1983), Bill Kubas (1990)
- Russ Jackson Award: Josh Alexander (2001), Dillon Heap (2011)
- Frank Tindall Trophy: David "Tuffy" Knight (1972, 1979), Rich Newbrough (1991), Rick Zmich (1995), Gary Jeffries (2003), Michael Faulds (2016, 2024, 2025)

== Laurier Golden Hawks in the CFL ==
As of the start of the 2026 CFL season, 14 former Golden Hawks players were on CFL teams' rosters:

- Bryce Bell, Calgary Stampeders
- Luke Brubacher, Hamilton Tiger-Cats
- Tanner Cadwallader, Winnipeg Blue Bombers
- Josh Connors, Ottawa Redblacks
- Taylor Elgersma, Winnipeg Blue Bombers
- Kurleigh Gittens Jr., Hamilton Tiger-Cats
- Scott Hutter, Montreal Alouettes
- Ethan Jordan, Ottawa Redblacks
- Jason MacGougan, Calgary Stampeders
- Braydon Noll, Montreal Alouettes
- Jesulayomi Ojutalayo, Calgary Stampeders
- Godfrey Onyeka, Calgary Stampeders
- Sebastian Parsalidis, Toronto Argonauts
- Robbie Smith, Edmonton Elks
