= Philippe Girard =

Canadian football player (born 1973)

No. 5
- Position: Defensive back

Personal information
- Born: December 10, 1973 (age 52); Montreal, Quebec
- Listed height: 6 ft 2 in (1.88 m)
- Listed weight: 215 lb (98 kg)

Career information
- University: Mount Allison
- CFL draft: 1998: 1st round, 5th overall pick

Career history
- 1998–2001: Edmonton Eskimos
- 2003–2004: Montreal Alouettes

Philippe Girard (born December 10, 1973) is a retired Canadian football player. He was a defensive back with the Edmonton Eskimos and the Montreal Alouettes in the Canadian Football League.

== Biography ==
A native of Montreal, Quebec, Girard is an alumnus of Mount Allison University, where he played football for the Mount Allison Mounties.

At Mount Allison, he was a two time all conference player (1996-1997), and voted on the second All Canadian team in 1997. He also earned the 1997 Atlantic Conference Best defensive player award, losing the President's trophy (CIAU defensive player of the year award) to Jason Van Geel of the University of Waterloo. He also helped the Mounties win the 1997 AUAA Championship over the St.FX X-Men 20-17, at Oland Stadium. His collegiate career ended when the Mounties lost 34-19 to eventual Vanier Cup champions UBC Thunderbirds at Huskies Stadium in Halifax, on Saturday November 15, 1997.

After graduation in 1998, Girard was selected in the first round (5th overall) of the CFL entry draft by the Edmonton Eskimos, the highest Mount Allison draft pick ever.

Girard joined the Montreal Alouettes in 2003 and played two seasons for his hometown team.

=== Retirement ===
Girard retired from the CFL at the end of the 2004 season and is the Vice President of the Montreal Alouettes Alumni Association.
