= 41st Vanier Cup =

2005 Canadian university football championship

- The Laurier Golden Hawks won the game, defeating Saskatchewan 24-23.
Saskatchewan Huskies	Wilfrid Laurier Golden Hawks
(8–0)	(8–0)
23	24
Head coach: Brian Towriss	Head coach: Gary Jeffries
	1	2	3	4	Total
Saskatchewan Huskies	0	7	6	10	23
Wilfrid Laurier Golden Hawks	1	7	7	9	24
- Date: December 3, 2005
- Stadium: Ivor Wynne Stadium
- Location: Hamilton
- Ted Morris Memorial Trophy: Ryan Pyear, Wilfrid Laurier QB
- Bruce Coulter Award: David Montoya, Wilfrid Laurier DE
- Attendance: 16,827

Broadcasters
- Network: The Score/The Score HD

The 41st Vanier Cup was played on December 3, 2005, at Ivor Wynne Stadium in Hamilton, Ontario, and decided the CIS Football champion for the 2005 season. The Wilfrid Laurier Golden Hawks completed a perfect season by defeating the previously undefeated Saskatchewan Huskies by a score of 24-23, on a last minute field goal by placekicker Brian Devlin. In a game that saw five lead-changes, the Golden Hawks overcame an eight-point fourth quarter deficit to take the lead with 19 seconds remaining, a lead they would not relinquish.

== Game summary ==
Saskatchewan Huskies (23) - TDs, David Stevens (3); FGs Braden Suchan (1); cons., Braden Suchan (2).

Wilfrid Laurier Golden Hawks (24) - TDs, Andy Baechler, Nick Cameron, Bryon Hickey; FGs Brian Devlin (1); singles, Brian Devlin (1); cons., Brian Devlin (2).

=== Scoring summary ===
First Quarter
WLU - Single Devlin missed 30 yard field goal attempt (3:29)

Second Quarter
SSK - TD Stevens 1 rush (Suchan kick) (2:35)
WLU - TD Baechler 23 pass from Pyear (Devlin convert) (5:18)

Third Quarter
WLU - TD Cameron 5 pass from Pyear (Devlin convert) (5:18)
SSK - TD Stevens 6 pass from Bilan (Two-point convert failed) (13:54)
Fourth Quarter
SSK - FG Suchan 41 (2:19)
SSK - TD Stevens 85 rush (Suchan kick) (8:14)
WLU - TD Hickey 10 pass from Pyear (Two-point convert failed) (12:07)
WLU - FG Devlin 32 (14:41)

=== Notable game facts ===
- The Wilfrid Laurier Golden Hawks became the 10th team in CIS history to claim the Vanier Cup after an undefeated season.
- This was only the third time in the game's history that a Vanier Cup was decided by one point, with the last time occurring in 1971.
- On the game-winning drive, the Golden Hawks gambled on a third-and-fifteen with a 17-yard completion to Dante Luciani.
