= List of Saskatchewan Huskies football seasons =

This is an incomplete list of seasons competed by the University of Saskatchewan Huskies football team, a team that competes in Canadian Interuniversity Sport. The sports team was established in 1912, however they did not join the Western Intercollegiate Rugby Football Union until it was founded in 1927. Throughout their history, the Huskies have won 3 Vanier Cups.

Vanier Cup Championships	Conference Championships	Regular season championships

Legend:
F = Points for, A = Points against

Season	Coach	Won	Lost	Tied	Points	F	A	Home	Away	Standing	Playoff Results
1912	Beaton Squires	No Games Played									
1913	A.G. Adamson	0	3	0	0						No playoffs
1914	Porter	2	1	0	4						No playoffs
1915	John Bracken	1	2	0	2						No playoffs
1916	No team										
1917	John Bracken	Record unavailable									
1918	No team										
1919	Beaton Squires	0	4	0	0						No playoffs
1920	Dr. Eddie Nagle	1	2	0	2						No playoffs
1921	Stan Wilson	1	2	0	2						No playoffs
1922	Fred Loomis	1	4	0	2						No playoffs
1923	Dr. Eddie Nagle	1	1	1	3						No playoffs
1924	Ken King	0	1	0	0						No playoffs
1925	Dr. Eddie Nagle	2	3	0	4						No playoffs
1926	Ken King	3	1	0	6						No playoffs
1927	Ken King	0	6	0	0						No playoffs
1928	Kent Phillips	3	4	0	6						No playoffs
1929	Kent Phillips	5	3	0	10						No playoffs
1930	Kent Phillips	5	1	0	10						No playoffs
1931	Kent Phillips	3	5	0	6						No playoffs
1932	Kent Phillips	5	2	0	7						No playoffs
1933	Kent Phillips	2	3	0	4						No playoffs
1934	Kent Phillips	1	5	1	3						No playoffs
1935	Kent Phillips	3	1	0	6						No playoffs
1936	Kent Phillips	5	1	0	10						No playoffs
1937	Kent Phillips	4	1	0	8						No playoffs
1938	Colb McEown	2	3	0	4						No playoffs
1939	Colb McEown	3	3	0	6						No playoffs
1940	Kent Phillips	1	3	0	2						No playoffs
1941	Kent Phillips/Colb McEown	4	2	0	8						No playoffs
1942	Colb McEown	1	1	0	2						No playoffs
1943	Colb McEown	3	1	0	6						No playoffs
1944	Colb McEown	0	2	0	0						No playoffs
1945	Kent Phillips	3	3	0	6						No playoffs
1946	Bob Arn	1	4	0	2						No playoffs
1947	Jack Lawrence	0	6	0	0						No playoffs
1948	Bill Neale/Fran Pyne	0	5	0	0						No playoffs
1949	Bill Neale/Fran Pyne	1	2	0	2						No playoffs
1950	No team										
1951	No team										
1952	No team										
1953	No team										
1954	No team										
1955	No team										
1956	No team										
1957	No team										
1958	No team										
1959	Howard Nixon	0	6	0	0	29	226	0-3	0-3	3rd	Missed playoffs
1960	Barry Roseborough	0	4	0	0	1	78	0-2	0-2	3rd	Missed playoffs
1961	Barry Roseborough	0	4	1	1	54	121			3rd	Missed playoffs
1962	Barry Roseborough	1	5	0	2	23	218			4th	Missed playoffs
1963	Ross Hetherington	1	5	0	2	44	206			4th	Missed playoffs
1964	Bill Bolonchuk	1	4	0	2						Missed playoffs
1965	Bill Bolonchuk	4	2	0	8					t-1st	Huskies shared the Hardy Trophy with Alberta.
1966	Bill Bolonchuk	3	3	0	6					3rd	Missed playoffs
1967	Dan Marisi	4	3	0	8					3rd	Missed playoffs
1968	Dan Marisi	0	6	0	0			0-3	0-3	4th	Missed playoffs
1969	Al Ledingham	1	5	0	2	67	169			4th	Missed playoffs
1970	Al Ledingham	3	5	0	6	93	82			4th	Missed playoffs
1971	Al Ledingham	2	6	0	4	88	126	1-3	1-3	4th	Missed playoffs
1972	Bob Laycoe	2	6	0	4	123	199			4th	Missed playoffs
1973	Val Schneider	6	2	0	12	231	172	4-0	2-2	2nd	Lost Hardy Trophy Final 21-8 to Manitoba
1974*	Val Schneider	5	2	0	10	176	105			1st	Lost Churchill Bowl 41-17 to Western Ontario
1975	Val Schneider	5	3	0	10	215	167			2nd	Missed playoffs
1976	Val Schneider	4	3	1	9	161	141			2nd	Lost Hardy Trophy Final 36-10 to UBC
1977	Val Schneider	1	7	0	2	92	148			5th	Missed playoffs
1978	Val Schneider	3	5	0	6	123	195			4th	Missed playoffs
1979	Bob Brennan	2	6	0	4	118	181			5th	Missed playoffs
1980	Val Schneider	1	7	0	2	99	154			5th	Missed playoffs
1981	Val Schneider	1	7	0	2	81	180			5th	Missed playoffs
1982	Val Schneider	3	5	0	6	141	205			3rd	Missed playoffs
1983	Val Schneider	4	4	0	8	180	210			3rd	Missed playoffs
1984	Brian Towriss	3	5	0	6	124	199			4th	Missed playoffs
1985	Brian Towriss	2	6	0	4	117	227	2-2	0-4	5th	Missed playoffs
1986	Brian Towriss	3	5	0	6	159	224	2-2	1-3	3rd	Missed playoffs
1987	Brian Towriss	2	6	0	4	146	174	2-2	0-4	4th	Missed playoffs
1988	Brian Towriss	6	2	0	12	219	202	3-1	3-1	2nd	Lost Hardy Trophy Final 46-33 to Calgary in OT
1989	Brian Towriss	6	2	0	12	211	131	2-2	4-0	1st	Won Hardy Trophy Final 22-18 over UBC; Won Churchill Bowl 40-11 over Queen's; Lost Vanier Cup 35-10 to Western Ontario
1990	Brian Towriss	6	2	0	12	206	105	4-0	2-2	1st	Won Hardy Trophy Final 24-9 over UBC; Won Churchill Bowl 41-13 over Bishop's; Won Vanier Cup 24-20 over Saint Mary's
1991	Brian Towriss	5	3	0	10	182	217	3-1	2-2	2nd	Won Hardy Trophy Final 23-11 over Manitoba; Lost Atlantic Bowl 31-14 to Mount Allison
1992	Brian Towriss	3	5	0	6	124	222	2-2	1-3	5th	Missed playoffs
1993	Brian Towriss	3	4	1	7	225	210	1-3	2-1-1	4th	Missed playoffs
1994	Brian Towriss	6	2	0	12	281	167	3-1	3-1	1st	Won Hardy Trophy Final 34-17 over Calgary; Won Atlantic Bowl 35-24 over Saint Mary's; Lost Vanier Cup 50-40 to Western Ontario in OT
1995	Brian Towriss	6	2	0	12	218	195	3-1	3-1	2nd	Lost Hardy Trophy Final 32-30 to Calgary in OT
1996	Brian Towriss	7	1	0	14	218	137	3-1	4-0	1st	Won Hardy Trophy Final 37-16 over UBC; Won Churchill Bowl 33-9 over Guelph; Won Vanier Cup 31-12 over St. Francis Xavier
1997	Brian Towriss	5	3	0	10	183	156	2-2	3-1	3rd	Missed playoffs
1998	Brian Towriss	6	2	0	12	226	168	4-0	2-2	1st	Won Hardy Trophy Final 31-28 over UBC; Won Churchill Bowl 33-17 over Western Ontario; Won Vanier Cup 24-17 over Concordia
1999	Brian Towriss	6	2	0	12	233	151	3-1	3-1	2nd	Won Canada West Semi-final 42-16 over Manitoba; Won Hardy Trophy Final 31-24 over UBC; Lost Churchill Bowl 27-21 to Laval
2000	Brian Towriss	2	6	0	4	126	232	0-4	2-2	6th	Missed playoffs
2001	Brian Towriss	5	3	0	10	200	172	3-1	2-2	3rd	Lost Canada West Semi-final 58-31 to Regina
2002	Brian Towriss	4	4	0	8	162	159	2-2	2-2	4th	Won Canada West Semi-final 37-18 over Manitoba; Won Hardy Trophy Final 44-28 over Regina; Won Mitchell Bowl 22-0 over McGill; Lost Vanier Cup 33-21 to Saint Mary's
2003	Brian Towriss	8	0	0	16	231	124	4-0	4-0	1st	Lost Canada West Semi-final 10-4 to Alberta
2004	Brian Towriss	6	2	0	12	276	91	3-1	3-1	2nd	Won Canada West Semi-final 39-0 over UBC; Won Hardy Trophy Final 21-20 over Alberta; Won Mitchell Bowl Final 31-16 over Saint Mary's; Lost Vanier Cup 7-1 to Laval
2005	Brian Towriss	8	0	0	16	294	99	4-0	4-0	1st	Won Canada West Semi-final 32-6 over UBC; Won Hardy Trophy Final 30-17 over Alberta; Won Mitchell Bowl 29-27 over Laval; Lost Vanier Cup 24-23 to Wilfrid Laurier
2006	Brian Towriss	6	2	0	12	282	148	3-1	3-1	2nd	Won Canada West Semi-final 35-16 over UBC; Won Hardy Trophy Final 32-15 over Manitoba; Won Mitchell Bowl 35-28 over Ottawa; Lost Vanier Cup 13-8 to Laval
2007	Brian Towriss	5	3	0	10	213	131	2-2	3-1	3rd	Lost Canada West Semi-final 19-13 to Regina
2008	Brian Towriss	6	2	0	10	217	83	4-0	2-2	1st	Lost Canada West Semi-final 40-30 to Simon Fraser
2009	Brian Towriss	7	1	0	14	211	112	4-0	3-1	1st	Won Canada West Semi-final 53-23 over Regina; Lost Hardy Trophy Final 39-38 to Calgary
2010	Brian Towriss	6	2	0	12	317	179	3-1	3-1	1st	Lost Canada West Semi-final 31-30 to Alberta
2011	Brian Towriss	5	3	0	10	238	140	3-1	2-2	3rd	Lost Canada West Semi-final 27-22 to UBC
2012	Brian Towriss	5	3	0	10	252	218	3-1	2-2	3rd	Lost Canada West Semi-final 31-9 to Regina
2013	Brian Towriss	5	3	0	10	227	204	2-2	3-1	3rd	Lost Canada West Semi-final 37-36 to Manitoba
2014	Brian Towriss	6	2	0	12	249	226	3-1	3-1	2nd	Lost Canada West Semi-final 47-39 to Manitoba
2015	Brian Towriss	3	5	0	6	240	300	1-3	2-2	4th	Lost Canada West Semi-final 37-29 to Calgary
2016	Brian Towriss	5	3	0	10	261	205	3-1	2-2	3rd	Lost Canada West Semi-final 47-17 to Calgary
2017	Scott Flory	2	6	0	4	245	286	1-3	1-3	5th	Missed playoffs
2018	Scott Flory	5	3	0	10	258	174	3-1	2-2	3rd	Won Canada West Semi-final 31-28 over UBC; Won Hardy Trophy Final 43-18 over Calgary; Lost Mitchell Bowl 47-24 to Western
2019	Scott Flory	5	3	0	10	257	161	4-0	1-3	2nd	Won Canada West Semi-final 28-23 over Alberta; Lost Hardy Trophy Final 29-4 to Calgary

1974* - The Hardy Trophy was awarded to the regular season champion this season. As a result, the regular season champion advanced to the Churchill Bowl.
