= 1978 CFL draft =

Canadian football draft

The 1978 CFL draft composed of eight rounds where 90 Canadian football players were chosen from eligible Canadian universities and Canadian players playing in the NCAA. A total of 18 players were selected as territorial exemptions, with the Toronto Argonauts being the only team to make no picks during this stage of the draft.

== Territorial exemptions ==
Calgary Stampeders Miles Gorrell DT Ottawa

Calgary Stampeders Robert Lubig G Montana State

Hamilton Tiger-Cats Rocky DiPietro TB Ottawa

Hamilton Tiger-Cats Bruce Holland DT Wilfrid Laurier

Hamilton Tiger-Cats Ted Kogler LB Waterloo

Saskatchewan Roughriders Rodney Besler T Utah

Saskatchewan Roughriders Doug Redl G Saskatchewan

Winnipeg Blue Bombers Leo Ezerins TE Whitworth

Winnipeg Blue Bombers Bernie Morrison LB Manitoba

Winnipeg Blue Bombers Tim Allan G Toronto

British Columbia Lions John Blake G San Jose State

British Columbia Lions Phil Luke DE Simon Fraser

Ottawa Rough Riders Dick Bakker T Queen's

Ottawa Rough Riders Bruce Walker WR Windsor

Edmonton Eskimos Joe Poplawski WR Alberta

Edmonton Eskimos Dave Willox DE Alberta

Montreal Alouettes Rene Deschamps DT Calgary

Montreal Alouettes Craig Labbett TE Western Ontario

== 1st round ==
1. Calgary Stampeders Dave Kirzinger DT Ottawa

2. Hamilton Tiger-Cats Bob O'Doherty WR Queen's

3. British Columbia Lions Rick Goltz DT Simon Fraser

4. Winnipeg Blue Bombers Evan Jones TE British Columbia

5. Toronto Argonauts Mark Brown TB Guelph

6. Montreal Alouettes Neil Quilter OT British Columbia

7. Ottawa Rough Riders Dan Taylor TB Iowa Central

8. Edmonton Eskimos Rick Dundas LB Whitworth

9. Montreal Alouettes Phil Noble LB Western Ontario

== 2nd round ==
10. Calgary Stampeders Rob Kochel DB Western Ontario

11. Hamilton Tiger-Cats Larry Colbey T Simon Fraser

12. Montreal Alouettes Gary Boechler G Saskatchewan

13. Winnipeg Blue Bombers Bob Stracina WR Acadia

14. Montreal Alouettes Jerry Friesen LB Saskatchewan

15. British Columbia Lions Tom Schultz LB Simon Fraser

16. Montreal Alouettes Bob Hultgren WR McMaster

17. Edmonton Eskimos Rick Bellamy G Wilfrid Laurier

18. Montreal Alouettes Ty Morris WR Puget Sound

== 3rd round ==
19. Calgary Stampeders Dave Allen DE Bishop's

20. Hamilton Tiger-Cats Angelo Castallan DT Toronto

21. Saskatchewan Roughriders Les McFarlane DB Saskatchewan

22. Winnipeg Blue Bombers Vaughn Wright TB Guelph

23. Toronto Argonauts Jerry Gulyes K Wilfrid Laurier

24. Edmonton Eskimos Gerry Palmer DB Carleton

25. Montreal Alouettes Bill O'Bryan C Oregon State

26. Edmonton Eskimos Paul Watson K Washington State

27. Calgary Stampeders Gary Tom WR McMaster

== 4th round ==
28. Calgary Stampeders Mike Karpow K Waterloo

29. Hamilton Tiger-Cats Dave Stumpf T Toronto

30. Saskatchewan Roughriders Maurice Butler WR Simon Fraser

31. Winnipeg Blue Bombers Julian Hanlon G Ottawa

32. Toronto Argonauts John Greenough DT McMaster

33. British Columbia Lions Phil Roberts LB McGill

34. Ottawa Rough Riders Phil Battaglia LB New Brunswick

35. Edmonton Eskimos Jim Hole G Alberta

36. Montreal Alouettes Sandy Gray DB Ottawa

== 5th round ==
37. Calgary Stampeders Mark Moors G Acadia

38. Hamilton Tiger-Cats Bill Levine DT Toronto

39. Saskatchewan Roughriders Mike Hume TB Concordia

40. Winnipeg Blue Bombers Dave Neber DE British Columbia

41. Toronto Argonauts Tim Jones WR Simon Fraser

42. British Columbia Lions Barry Dobson TE McGill

43. Ottawa Rough Riders Lindon Davidson T Ottawa

44. Edmonton Eskimos Richard Foggo DB Calgary

45. Montreal Alouettes Kerry Powell HB Queen's

== 6th round ==
46. Calgary Stampeders Bob Dear G Calgary

47. Hamilton Tiger-Cats Yves Leclerc QB Ottawa

48. Saskatchewan Roughriders Mike Lamborn DB Saskatchewan

49. Winnipeg Blue Bombers Steve Davis DT Bishop's

50. Toronto Argonauts Tim Jones C Simon Fraser

51. British Columbia Lions John Tietzen WR Alberta

52. Ottawa Rough Riders Dave Yurincich DT Wilfrid Laurier

53. Edmonton Eskimos Mark Coflin G Alberta

54. Montreal Alouettes Henry Svec DT Western Ontario

== 7th round ==
55. Calgary Stampeders Jim Mossop DB Toronto

56. Hamilton Tiger-Cats Mike Katarincic DB Wilfrid Laurier

57. Saskatchewan Roughriders Daniel Graham LB McGill

58. Winnipeg Blue Bombers Gord Bone TE Manitoba

59. Toronto Argonauts Clark Johnson WR Concordia

60. British Columbia Lions Bill Hole DT Alberta

61. Ottawa Rough Riders Tom Barbeau TB McGill

62. Edmonton Eskimos Dave Zacharko LB Alberta

63. Montreal Alouettes Clarence Coleman TB Ottawa

== 8th round ==
64. Calgary Stampeders Cam Prange C Waterloo

65. Hamilton Tiger-Cats Dan Medwin TE Ottawa

66. Saskatchewan Roughriders Tim Molnar TB Saskatchewan

67. Winnipeg Blue Bombers Duane Hysop QB Manitoba

68. Toronto Argonauts Stan Strecker DB Guelph

69. British Columbia Lions Don Guy DB Alberta

70. Ottawa Rough Riders Mike Lyriotokis DT Prince Edward Island

71. Edmonton Eskimos Wes McHarg DB Alberta

72. Montreal Alouettes Eris Salvatori TB McGill
