= Jerry Friesen =

Canadian football player (born 1955)

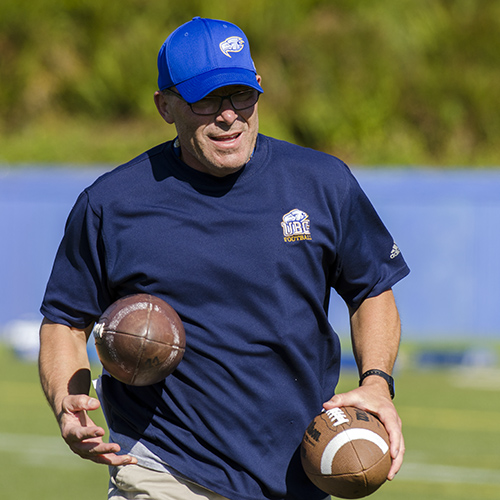
- Friesen with UBC in 2013

Saskatchewan Huskies
- Title: Special teams coordinator

Personal information
- Born: October 27, 1955 (age 71); Rosthern, Saskatchewan, Canada
- Listed height: 6 ft 1 in (1.85 m)
- Listed weight: 220 lb (100 kg)

Career information
- Position: Linebacker
- University: University of Saskatchewan
- CFL draft: 1978: 2nd round, 14th overall pick

Career history

Playing
- 1978–1980: Montreal Alouettes
- 1981–1985: Saskatchewan Roughriders

Coaching
- 1986–1995: Saskatchewan Huskies
- 1996: Saskatchewan Roughriders
- 1997–2000: Calgary Dinos
- 2001–2010: Alberta Golden Bears
- 2011: Saskatchewan Roughriders
- 2013–2014: UBC Thunderbirds
- 2017–present: Saskatchewan Huskies

Awards and highlights
- Gino Fracas Award (2024); Tom Pate Memorial Award (1985)

Jerry Friesen (born October 27, 1955) is a former award-winning linebacker in the Canadian Football League (CFL) and is the special teams coordinator for the Saskatchewan Huskies.

== University career ==
A graduate of University of Saskatchewan, Friesen was 3-time all-star with the Huskies. In 1994, he was inducted into the Huskie Wall of Fame.

== Professional career ==
Friesen was drafted in the second round, 14th overall, by the Montreal Alouettes in the 1978 CFL draft and played in 48 regular season games with them. He then joined his hometown Saskatchewan Roughriders for five years, winning the prestigious Tom Pate Memorial Award for outstanding community service in 1985.

== Coaching career ==
Friesen took up coaching after his playing days. He started with alma mater as an assistant coach for the Saskatchewan Huskies for 10 seasons, winning the Vanier Cup in 1990. After a year as linebacker coach with the Saskatchewan Roughriders, he was the defensive coordinator with the Calgary Dinos. He next spent 10 years as head coach of the Alberta Golden Bears, being named CIS coach of the year in 2004, before he resigned to return to the Roughriders. He spent the 2011 season with the Roughriders, but was not retained following a disappointing season.

On March 11, 2013, Friesen was announced as the defensive coordinator for the UBC Thunderbirds. He spent two years with the Thunderbirds but was not retained following a head coaching change in 2015.

On May 2, 2017, it was announced that Friesen had re-joined his alma mater and was named the special teams coordinator for the Saskatchewan Huskies.

== Awards ==
In 2008, Friesen was enshrined in the Saskatoon Sports Hall of Fame.
