= Scott Redl =

Canadian football player (born 1961)

No. 69
- Positions: Offensive lineman, Defensive lineman

Personal information
- Born: July 19, 1961 (age 65); Saskatoon, Saskatchewan, Canada
- Listed height: 6 ft 4 in (1.93 m)
- Listed weight: 240 lb (109 kg)

Career information
- High school: Evan Hardy Collegiate
- University: Saskatchewan
- CFL draft: 1983

Career history
- 1983–1987: Saskatchewan Roughriders
- 1988: BC Lions
- 1989–1990: Winnipeg Blue Bombers

Awards and highlights
- Grey Cup champion (1990)

Scott Redl (born July 19, 1961) is a Canadian former professional football offensive lineman who played seven seasons in the Canadian Football League (CFL) with the Saskatchewan Roughriders and Winnipeg Blue Bombers. He was drafted by the Saskatchewan Roughriders as a territorial exemption in the 1983 CFL draft. He played CIS football at the University of Saskatchewan and attended Evan Hardy Collegiate in Saskatoon, Saskatchewan. Redl was also a member of the BC Lions.

== Early life ==
Redl played high school football for the Evan Hardy Collegiate Souls. He helped the team win several provincial football championships.

== College career ==
Redl played CIS football for the Saskatchewan Huskies. He earned Outstanding Lineman honors his final two seasons and was a Western Intercollegiate Football League All-Star his senior year. He spent time at both defensive and offensive line for the Huskies.

== Professional career ==
Redl was selected by the Saskatchewan Roughriders of the CFL as a territorial exemption in the 1983 CFL draft. He played for the Roughriders from 1983 to 1987. He was traded to the BC Lions in 1988. Redl signed with the CFL's Winnipeg Blue Bombers in 1989 and played for the team from 1989 to 1990, winning the 78th Grey Cup in 1990. He retired following the 1990 season.

== Personal life ==
Redl is the younger brother of fellow CFL player Doug Redl. He is also the uncle of Major League Baseball umpire Stu Scheurwater.
