= Evan Hardy Collegiate =

Location
- 605 Acadia Drive; Saskatoon, Saskatchewan, S7H 3V8; Canada; 52.120206°N 106.598069°W

Information
- Type: Secondary
- Motto: Excellence in All Things
- Opened: 1966
- School board: Saskatoon Public Schools
- Principal: Karen Peterson
- Grades: Grade 9 to Grade 12
- Enrollment: 903 (2022)
- Education system: Public
- Language: English
- Colours: Blue and gold
- Mascot: Bigfoot (the Saskuatch)
- Team name: Souls
- Website: Evan Hardy Collegiate

Evan Hardy Collegiate Institute is a secondary school located on the east side of Saskatoon, Saskatchewan, Canada, serving students from grades 9 through 12. It is also known as Evan Hardy, Hardy, or simply EHCI.

Evan Hardy Collegiate was named for noted University of Saskatchewan professor Evan Alan Hardy. The school was opened in 1966.

Evan Hardy centres the first Saskatoon Media School, an entire semester of media-based classes for students all around Saskatoon and area. It was one of only three Saskatoon high schools to offer the SAGE program (the others are Bedford Road and Walter Murray) for gifted students; it did so until 2021.

Its feeder schools are Colette Bourgonje School, College Park School, Greystone Heights School, Lakeridge School, Lakeview School, Roland Michener School, and Wildwood School.

== Extracurricular activities ==
=== Sports ===
Sport	Grade	Season
Junior and senior football	9-12	Aug-Nov
Senior golf	9-12	Sept/May–June (Spring Training League)
Freshman, junior and senior volleyball	9-12	Sept-Nov
Freshman, junior and senior basketball	9-12	Nov-March
Junior and senior badminton	9-12	March–May
Senior soccer	9-12	Aug-Nov
Cross country running	9-12	Aug-Oct
Wrestling	9-12	Dec-March
Track	9-12	March–May
Girls' and boys' curling	9-12	Oct-Mar
Football cheerleading	9-12	Sept-Oct
Competition cheerleading	9-12	Oct-May

=== Arts ===
Activity	Grades	Notes
Musical	9-12	Performances usually in December
Cabaret	9-12	Performances usually in March
Play/One Acts	9-12	Performances usually in April
Drama 30 One Acts	Grade 12	Drama 30 puts together one-acts for Festival every year. Two or three students direct; the rest act.
Choir	9-12	Year round class. 8 am Monday and Wednesday.
Jazz Choir	9-12	Students are invited in by the conductor.
Jr. Band	9	Class on timetable
Sr. Band	10-12	Year round class. 8 am Tuesday and Friday
Jazz Band	9-12	Not a class. 8 am Thursday.
Jazz Studies	11-12	Class taken along with Jazz Band. Thursdays at lunch (for singers and instruments).
Coffee House	9-12	Annual fundraiser for band trip. Students audition to sing, act or read poetry.
Showcase	9-12	End of the year 'talent show' for singers, musicians, actors, dancers and poets.

== Student council ==
The Evan Hardy SRC (student representative council) consists of several representatives of each grade, a team of directors, and three volunteer teacher advisors. The elections for Grade 10-12 leaders takes place at the end of the year. Two Grade 9 representatives are elected during November earlier in the year, and three more are later appointed through an interview process.

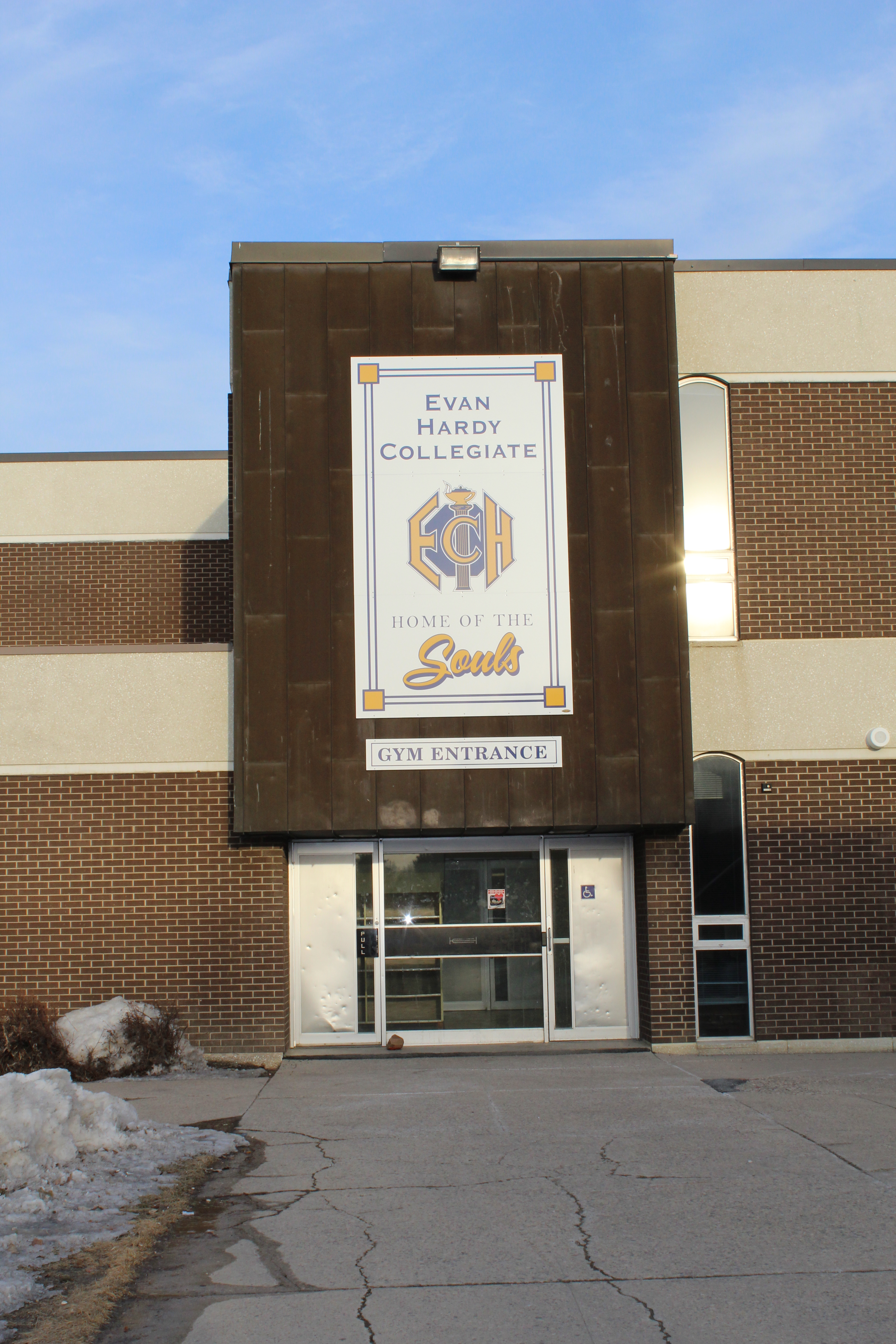
Hardy sign

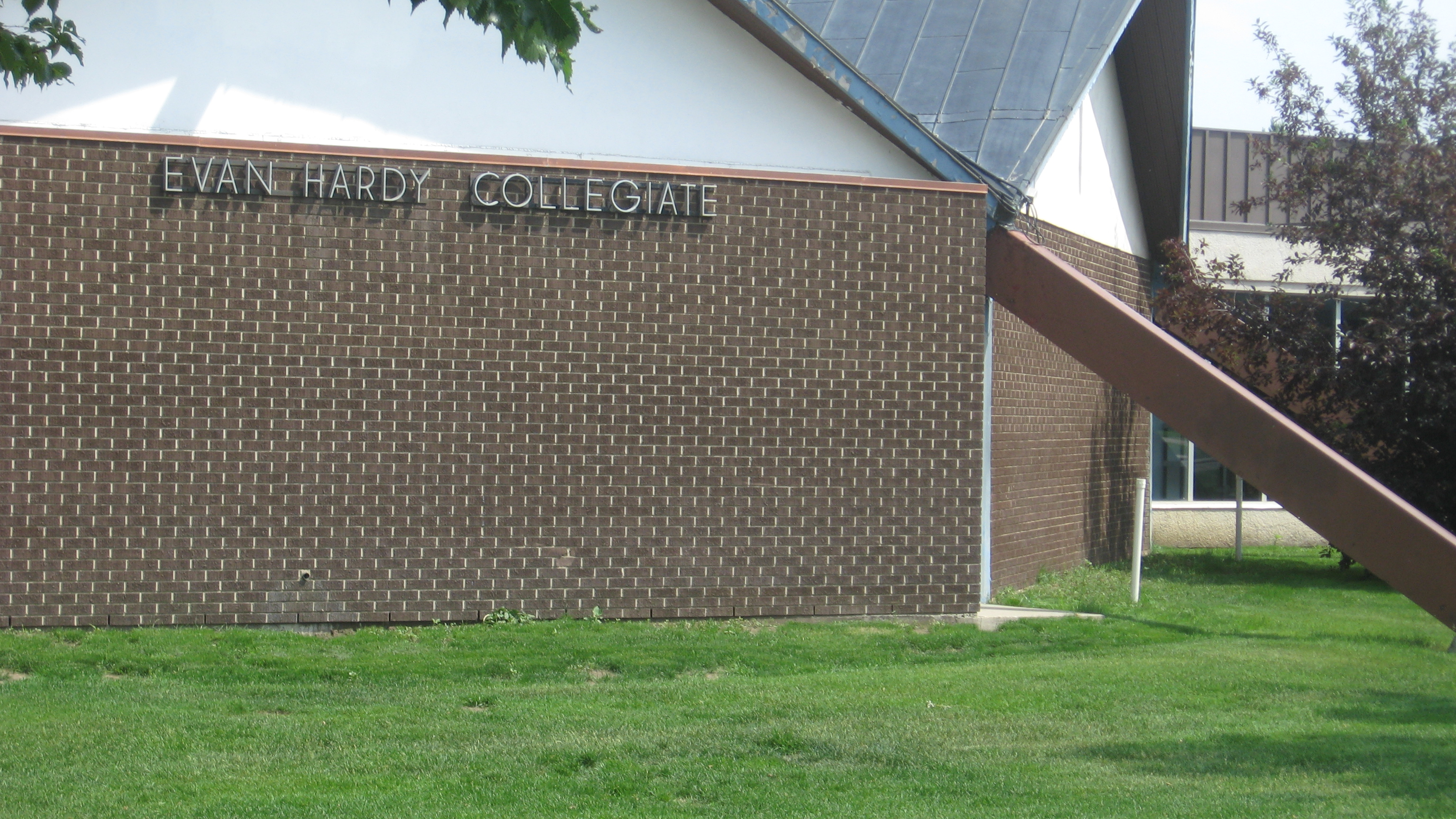
Another view

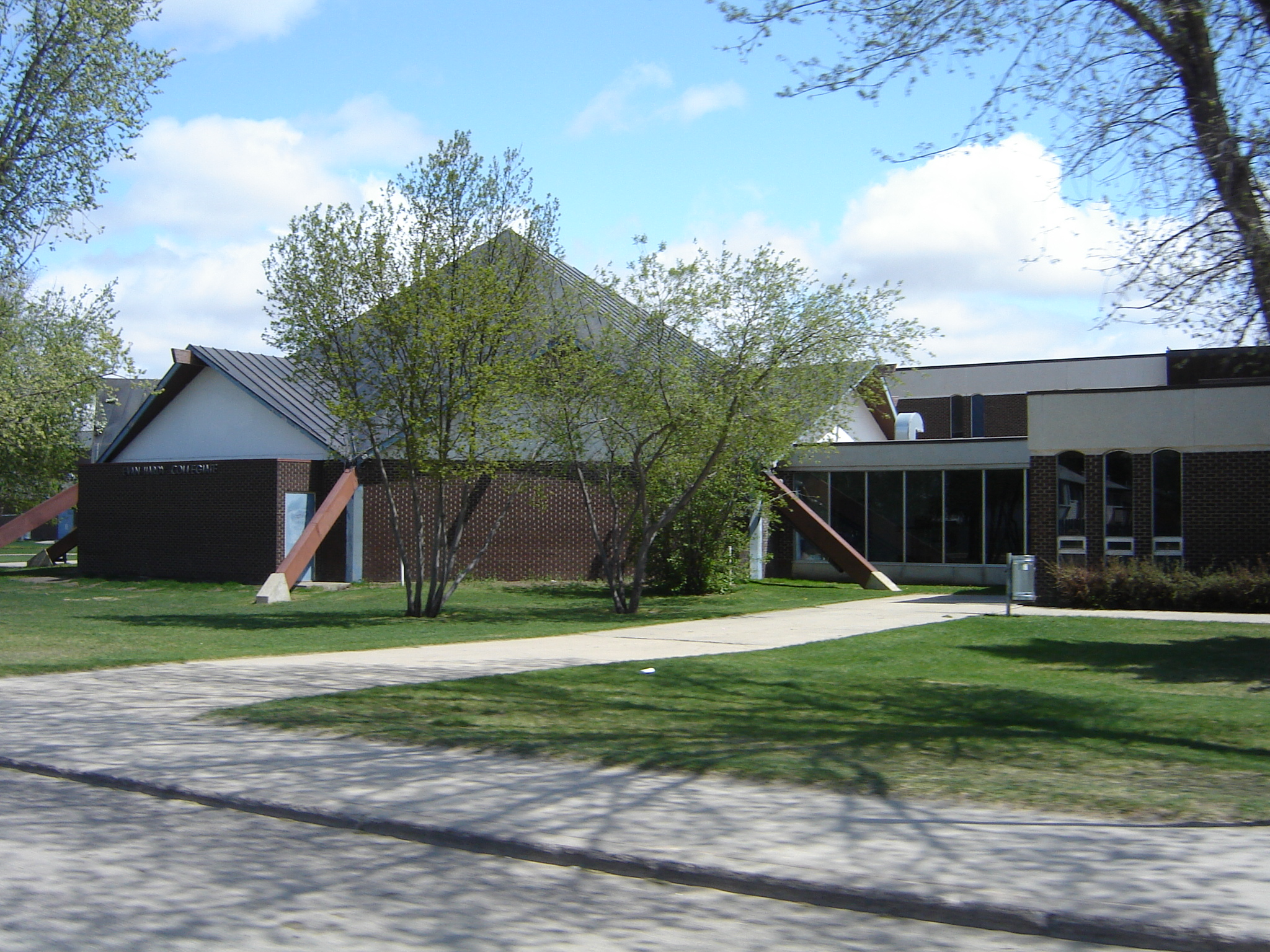
Evan Hardy Collegiate

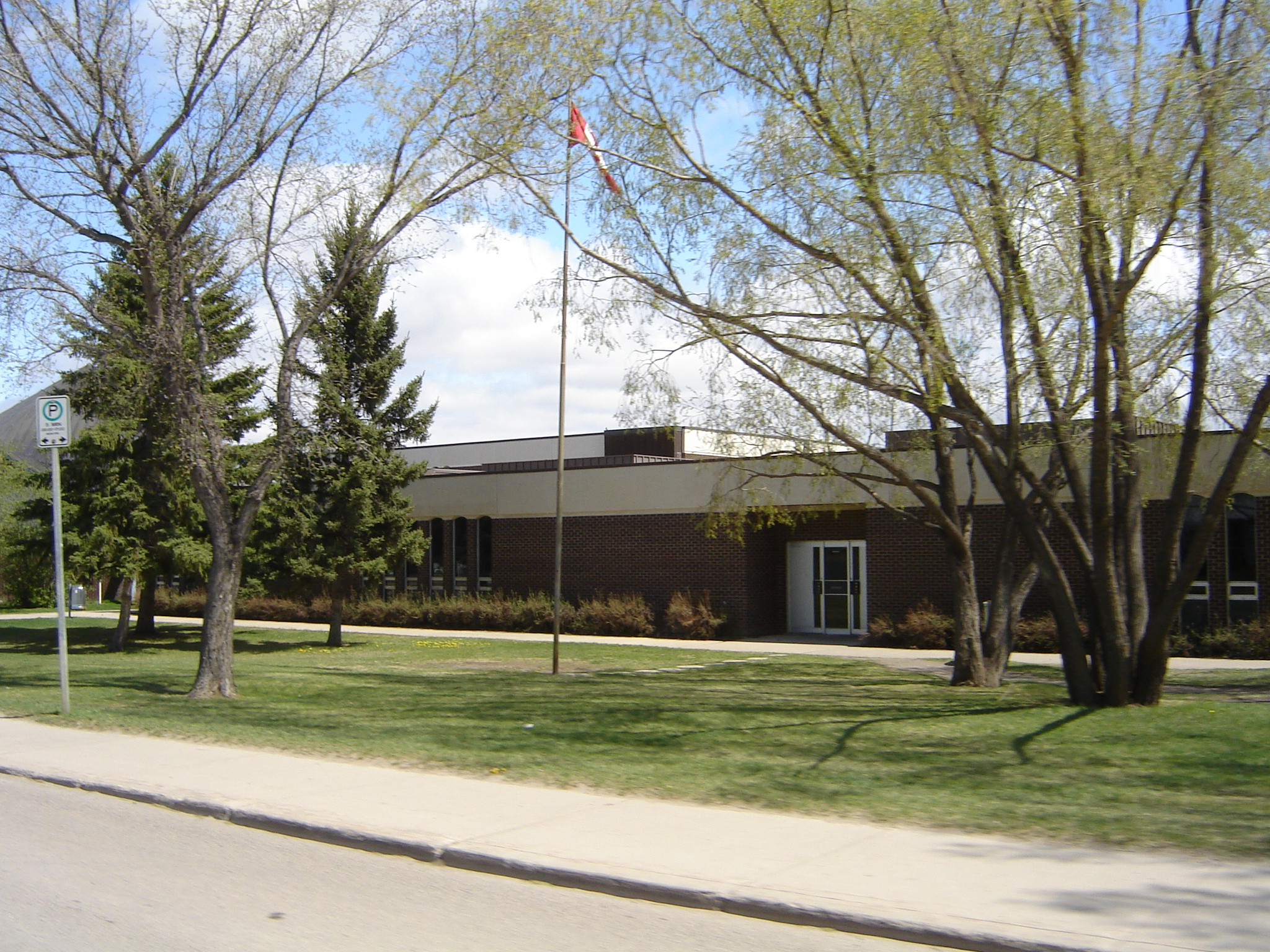
Evan Hardy Collegiate

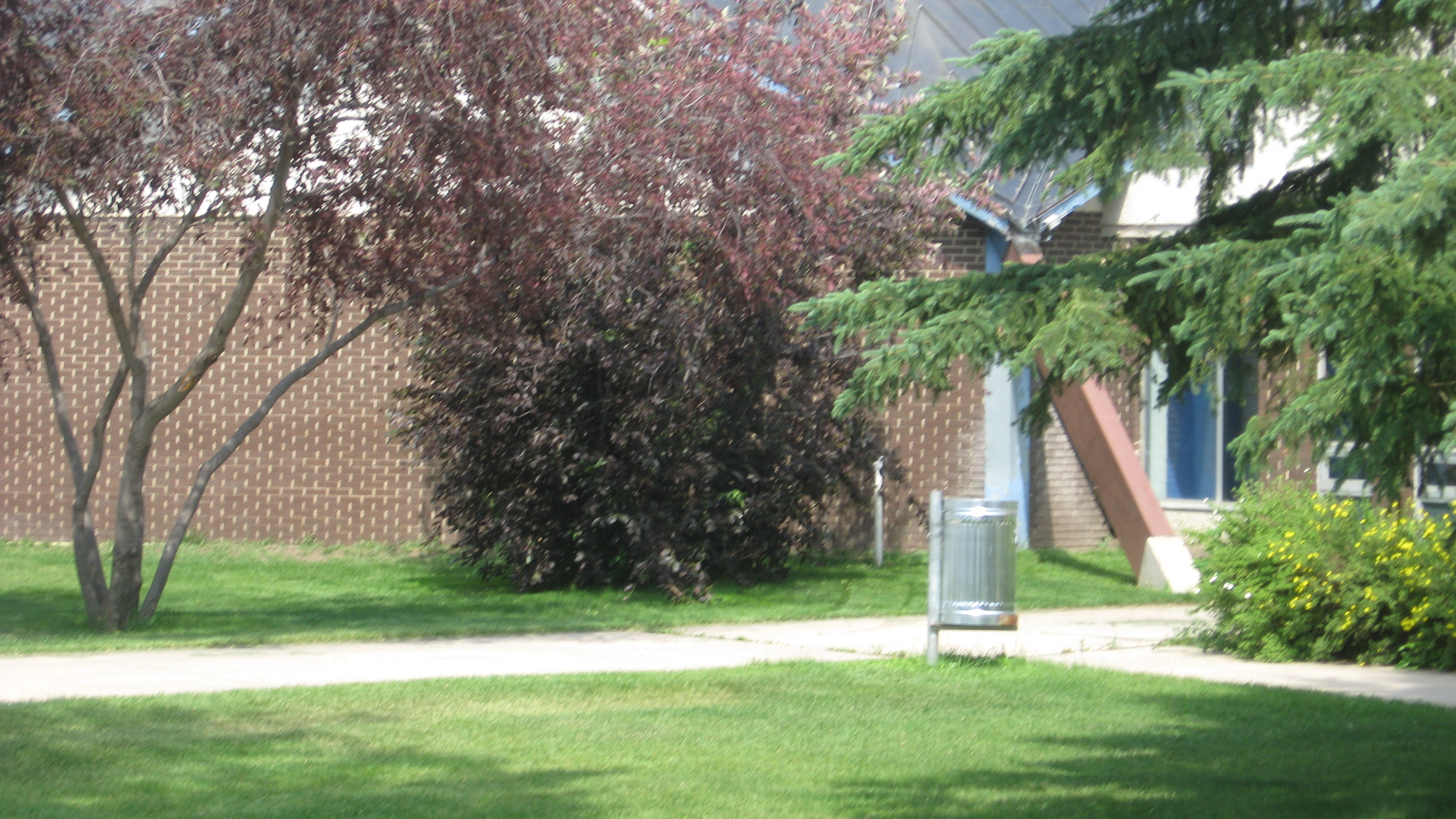
Another view

== Notable alumni ==
- Mike Anderson, former CFL player
- Jaime Battiste, Member of Parliament for Sydney—Victoria
- Ewan Currie, musician
- Martine Gaillard, TV personality
- Ryan Gullen, musician
- Garnet Hertz, artist, designer and Canada Research Chair
- Susan Ormiston, television broadcaster
- Kelly Parker, former Canadian national soccer team player
- Jeff Piercy, former CFL fullback
- Doug Redl, former CFL player
- Scott Redl, former CFL player
- Wade Regier, former head coach of the Minot State Beavers men's ice hockey team
- Kyle Riabko, musician/actor
- Sandra Sawatzky, artist
- Jay Semko, musician
- Brian Skrudland, former NHL forward
- Chandler Stephenson, current NHL player for the Seattle Kraken.
- Larry Wruck, former CFL player
- Trent Yawney, former Chicago Blackhawks head coach (2005–06)
