= Mark Moors =

Canadian football player (born 1957)

No. 50
- Position: Offensive lineman

Personal information
- Born: January 31, 1957 (age 69); Regina, Saskatchewan, Canada

Career information
- University: Acadia
- CFL draft: 1978: 5th round

Career history
- 1980–1982: Calgary Stampeders
- 1983–1986: Winnipeg Blue Bombers
- 1988: Ottawa Rough Riders
- 1989: Hamilton Tiger-Cats

Awards and highlights
- Grey Cup champion (1984)

Mark Moors (born January 31, 1957) is a Canadian former professional football offensive lineman who played ten seasons in the Canadian Football League (CFL) from 1980 to 1989 for the Calgary Stampeders, Winnipeg Blue Bombers, Ottawa Rough Riders, and Hamilton Tiger-Cats. He won one Grey Cup with Winnipeg.
