= Jordan Rempel =

Canadian football player (born 1985)

Profile
- Position: Offensive lineman

Personal information
- Born: April 20, 1985 (age 41); Caronport, Saskatchewan
- Listed height: 6 ft 6 in (1.98 m)
- Listed weight: 320 lb (145 kg)

Career information
- University: Saskatchewan
- CFL draft: 2007: 2nd round, 12th overall pick

Career history
- 2008: Hamilton Tiger-Cats
- 2009: Saskatchewan Roughriders
- Stats at CFL.ca

Jordan Rempel (born April 20, 1985) is a Canadian former professional football offensive lineman. He played for the Hamilton Tiger-Cats and Saskatchewan Roughriders of the Canadian Football League. He was drafted by the Hamilton Tiger-Cats in the second round of the 2007 CFL draft. He played CIS football for the Saskatchewan Huskies football team.
