= Doug Redl =

Canadian football player (born 1956)

No. 67
- Position: Offensive lineman

Personal information
- Born: September 3, 1956 (age 70); Saskatoon, Saskatchewan, Canada
- Listed height: 6 ft 4 in (1.93 m)
- Listed weight: 242 lb (110 kg)

Career information
- High school: Evan Hardy Collegiate
- University: Saskatchewan
- CFL draft: 1978

Career history

Playing
- 1978–1979: Toronto Argonauts
- 1980, 1982: Hamilton Tiger-Cats

Coaching
- 1984: Saskatchewan Huskies

Doug Redl (born September 3, 1956) is a Canadian former professional football offensive lineman who played four seasons in the Canadian Football League (CFL) with the Toronto Argonauts and Hamilton Tiger-Cats. He was drafted by the Saskatchewan Roughriders as a territorial exemption in the 1978 CFL draft. He played CIS football at the University of Saskatchewan. He is the older brother of fellow CFL player Scott Redl.

== Early life ==
Redl attended Evan Hardy Collegiate in Saskatoon, Saskatchewan.

== College career ==
Redl played for the Saskatchewan Huskies from 1974 to 1977. He named to the Canada West conference all-star team at offensive guard in 1976 and 1977. He also earned CIAU All-Canadian honours both years. Redl was named to the Canadian team for the Can-Am Bowl in Tampa, Florida, featuring college all-stars from Canada and the U.S., in 1977.

== Professional career ==
Redl was selected by the Saskatchewan Roughriders as a territorial exemption in the 1978 CFL draft. He played for the Toronto Argonauts from 1978 to 1979. He played for the Hamilton Tiger-Cats in 1980 and 1982. His career ended due to a leg injury.

== Coaching career ==
Redl was an assistant coach for the Saskatchewan Huskies in 1984.

== Personal life ==
Redl is the older brother of fellow CFL player Scott Redl.
