= 1915 Saskatchewan Huskies football team =

College football season

1915 Saskatchewan Huskies football
- Record: 1-2 ( )
- Head coach: John Bracken

The 1915 Saskatchewan Huskies football team represented the University of Saskatchewan in Canadian football. This was their third season.

== Schedule ==
Date	Opponent	Site	Result
1915	Saskatoon Quakers	Saskatoon, SK	W 10-6
1914	Saskatoon Quakers	Saskatoon, SK	L 13-6
1915	Saskatoon Quakers	Saskatoon, SK	L 15-4

== Roster ==
Saskatchewan Huskies roster
Players
- -- James Art
- -- Hedley Dimock
- -- Frederick Freer
- -- Hopkins

Full Huskies Year by Year updated 2010-12-19
