= Jeff Piercy =

Canadian football player (born 1983)

Profile
- Position: Fullback

Personal information
- Born: March 25, 1983 (age 43); Saskatoon, Saskatchewan
- Listed height: 6 ft 1 in (1.85 m)
- Listed weight: 229 lb (104 kg)

Career information
- High school: Evan Hardy Collegiate
- College: University of Oxford
- University: Saskatchewan
- CFL draft: 2005: 2nd round, 12th overall pick

Career history
- 2005–2007: Montreal Alouettes
- 2007–2008: Hamilton Tiger-Cats
- Stats at CFL.ca (archive)

Jeff Piercy (born March 25, 1983) is a Canadian former professional football fullback who played in the Canadian Football League (CFL). Piercy is an alumnus of Evan Hardy Collegiate, where he graduated in 2001.

Piercy played in college for the University of Saskatchewan and was named a Canada West All-Star in his final season. He was selected 12th overall in the 2nd round of the 2005 CFL draft and he played mostly on special teams his first year with the Montreal Alouettes.

In 2007, Piercy was traded to the Tiger-Cats in exchange for Jason Maas. In January 2009, Piercy retired from the CFL to pursue a Master's degree in Business Administration at Oxford.
