= Chuck Quilter =

American gridiron football player (1926–2014)

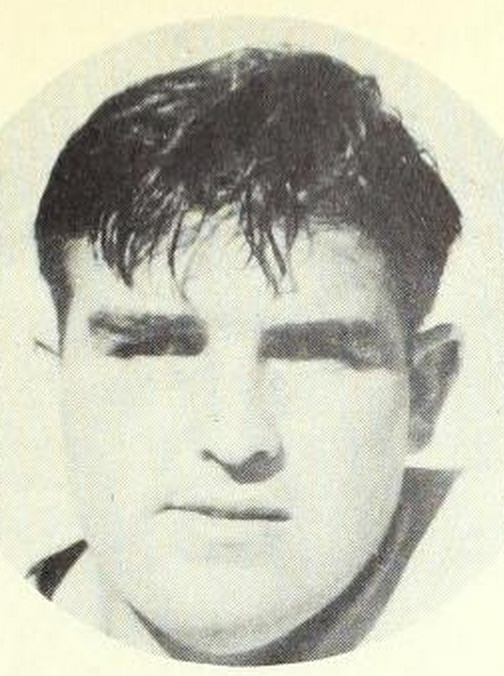
- Quilter c. 1948 at Tyler Junior College

Profile
- Positions: Tackle, Defensive tackle

Personal information
- Born: May 5, 1926; Shreveport, Louisiana, U.S.
- Died: January 21, 2014 (aged 87); San Antonio, Texas, U.S.
- Listed height: 6 ft 2 in (1.88 m)
- Listed weight: 200 lb (91 kg)

Career history
- 1949–1950: San Francisco 49ers
- 1951–1953: Edmonton Eskimos
- 1954–1959: BC Lions
- 1960: Calgary Stampeders
- 1961: Edmonton Eskimos

Awards and highlights
- CFL West All-Star (1951)

Charles Rew Quilter (May 5, 1926 – January 21, 2014) was an American professional football player who played for the San Francisco 49ers, Edmonton Eskimos, BC Lions and Calgary Stampeders. He played college football at Tyler Junior College. His son, Neil Quilter, also played in the CFL.
