= Rick Goltz =

Canadian gridiron football player (born 1955)

Profile
- Position: DT

Personal information
- Born: March 19, 1955 (age 71); Vancouver, British Columbia
- Listed height: 6 ft 4 in (1.93 m)
- Listed weight: 255 lb (116 kg)

Career information
- College: Simon Fraser
- CFL draft: 1978: 1st round, 3rd overall pick

Career history
- 1978–1982: British Columbia Lions
- 1983: Calgary Stampeders
- 1984–1987: Saskatchewan Roughriders
- 1987: Los Angeles Raiders
- Stats at Pro Football Reference

Ricardo Eugene Goltz (born March 19, 1955, in Vancouver, British Columbia, Canada) is a former gridiron NFL and CFL player.

He played his college football at Simon Fraser University in Burnaby, British Columbia. In 1978, he was drafted by his hometown B.C. Lions with the 3rd overall pick in the CFL draft. During the 1987 NFL strike, he was signed as a replacement player by the Los Angeles Raiders.
