= 1914 Saskatchewan Huskies football team =

College football season

1914 Saskatchewan Huskies football
- Conference: Independent
- Record: 2–1
- Head coach: Porter

The 1914 Saskatchewan Huskies football team represented the University of Saskatchewan in Canadian football. This was their second season and their first as a team that represented all colleges on campus.

== Schedule ==
Opponent	Site	Result
Saskatoon Quakers	Saskatoon, SK (Game 1 of Northern Saskatchewan Final)	W 8–5
Saskatoon Quakers	Saskatoon, SK (Game 2 of Northern Saskatchewan Final)	W 14–4
Regina Rugby Club	(Saskatchewan Provincial Final)	L 31–0

== Roster ==
Saskatchewan Huskies roster
Players
- -- Frederick Freer
- -- Donald Mitchell
- -- M.L. Skinner

Full Huskies Year by Year updated 2010-12-19
