= Dave Kirzinger =

Canadian football player

No. 69, 68
- Positions: Offensive tackle, Guard

Personal information
- Born: March 1, 1956 (age 70); Saskatoon, Saskatchewan, Canada
- Listed height: 6 ft 3 in (1.91 m)
- Listed weight: 240 lb (109 kg)

Career information
- University: British Columbia
- CFL draft: 1978: 1st round, 1st overall pick

Career history
- 1978–1986: Calgary Stampeders
- 1986: Toronto Argonauts

Awards and highlights
- CFL West All-Star (1983)

Dave Kirzinger (born March 1, 1956) is a Canadian football offensive lineman who played professionally nine seasons for the Calgary Stampeders and Toronto Argonauts.
