= Graeme Bell (Canadian football) =

Canadian football player (born 1980)

No. 26
- Position: Fullback

Personal information
- Born: October 15, 1980 (age 46); Regina, Saskatchewan, Canada
- Listed height: 5 ft 10 in (1.78 m)
- Listed weight: 229 lb (104 kg)

Career information
- High school: Walter Murray
- University: Saskatchewan
- CFL draft: 2005: undrafted

Career history
- 2005–2008: Winnipeg Blue Bombers
- 2009–2010: Edmonton Eskimos
- 2011–2013: Saskatchewan Roughriders
- Stats at CFL.ca (archive)

Graeme Bell (born October 15, 1980) is a Canadian former professional football fullback who played in the Canadian Football League (CFL). He was signed as an undrafted free agent in 2005 by the Winnipeg Blue Bombers. He played CIS football for the Saskatchewan Huskies. He was beaten with a baseball bat on May 17, 2007, in Saskatoon and underwent brain surgery.

On May 8, 2011, he was traded from the Edmonton Eskimos to the Saskatchewan Roughriders in exchange for a Sixth Round 2011 CFL draft choice.

Bell retired on February 10, 2014. He played in 97 games and recorded 18 career carries for 66 yards and 1 touchdown, and 7 receptions for 28 yards with 2 touchdowns. Bell also recorded 60 tackles on special teams.

Bell currently is a Regional Partner with Alair Homes and can be found volunteering for a variety of local charitable groups. He currently sits on the board of directors for Edmonton's Brain Care Centre.
