= 1913 Saskatchewan Huskies football team =

Football team representing University of Saskatchewan in Canada

1913 Saskatchewan Huskies football
- Record: 0-3 ( )
- Head coach: A.G. Adamson

The 1913 Saskatchewan Huskies football team represented the University of Saskatchewan in Canadian football. This was their inaugural season and technically represented the College of Arts and Science.

== Schedule ==
Date	Opponent	Site	Result
1913	Saskatoon Quakers	Saskatoon, SK	L 12-9
1913	Saskatoon Quakers	Saskatoon, SK	L 11-7
1913	College of Law	Saskatoon, SK	L 24-4
