= Neil Quilter =

Canadian football player (born 1956)

No. 58, 65
- Position: Offensive guard

Personal information
- Born: August 24, 1956 (age 70); Vancouver, British Columbia, Canada
- Listed height: 6 ft 2 in (1.88 m)
- Listed weight: 250 lb (113 kg)

Career information
- High school: Notre Dame (Vancouver)
- University: UBC
- CFL draft: 1978: 1st round, 6th overall pick

Career history
- Winnipeg Blue Bombers (1978)*; Saskatchewan Roughriders (1979–1986); Winnipeg Blue Bombers (1987)
- * Offseason or practice squad member only

Neil Quilter (born August 24, 1956) is a Canadian former professional football offensive guard who played nine seasons in the Canadian Football League (CFL) with the Saskatchewan Roughriders and Winnipeg Blue Bombers. He played college football at Weber State College and the University of British Columbia.

== Early life and college ==
Neil Quilter was born on August 24, 1956, in Vancouver, British Columbia. For high school, he attended Notre Dame Regional Secondary School in Vancouver.

Quilter first played three years of college football for the Weber State Wildcats of Weber State College. In 1977, he played his final year of college football with the UBC Thunderbirds of the University of British Columbia.

== Professional career ==
Quilter was selected by the Montreal Alouettes in the first round, with the sixth overall pick, of the 1978 CFL draft. He did not report to the Alouettes after turning down their contract offer. Montreal head coach Bob Geary said "I offered him a good base salary, a signing bonus and the contract was for two years." In June 1978, it was reported that Quilter had changed his mind and would report to Montreal. However, in August 1978, he signed a five-day trial with the Winnipeg Blue Bombers.

Quilter signed with the Saskatchewan Roughriders in 1979. He became a starter during his rookie year in 1979. He was temporarily suspended from the team in 1982 after trying to hold out for more money by not reporting to training camp. He ended up dressing in 13 games during the 1982 eeason. Quilter requested a trade in July 1984, stating that he was tired of losing. He missed most of the 1984 season due to a broken leg. He dressed in 11 games in 1986 and was diagnosed with turf toe during the season. However, he played through the pain, causing his big toe to become swollen and arthritic. It required surgery, causing him to miss the rest of the season and putting his career in doubt. Quilter dressed in 106 games overall for the Roughriders from 1979 to 1986. He was released by Saskatchewan on May 19, 1987, after refusing to take a paycut.

In June 1987, Quilter signed with the Blue Bombers during training camp after Richard Nemeth suffered a season-ending injury. Quilter played in the first game of the season, and then left the team without telling anyone. His toe injury from the year before had reportedly still been bothering him. Quilter was placed on Winnipeg's suspended list. On July 21, Blue Bombers players hung his helmet and uniform above the Winnipeg Stadium scoreboard on a flagpole during practice.

== Personal life ==
Quilter lived in Texas during the CFL offseasons. His father, Chuck Quilter, played in the NFL and CFL.
