= Saskatchewan Huskies football =

Canadian university gridiron football team

Saskatchewan Huskies
- Saskatchewan Huskies logo
- First season: 1912; 114 years ago
- Athletic director: Shawn Burt
- Head coach: Scott Flory; 9th year, 47–23 (.671)
- Home stadium: Griffiths Stadium
- Year built: 1967
- Stadium capacity: 6,171
- Stadium surface: FieldTurf
- Location: Saskatoon, Saskatchewan
- League: U Sports
- Conference: Canada West
- Past associations: WCIAA (1912-1919)
- All-time record: 309–307–5 (.502)
- Postseason record: 41–26 (.612)

Titles
- Vanier Cups: 3; 1990, 1996, 1998
- Uteck Bowls: 2; 2021, 2022
- Mitchell Bowls: 4; 2002, 2004, 2005, 2006, 2025
- Churchill Bowls: 4; 1989, 1990, 1996, 1998
- Atlantic Bowls: 1; 1994
- Hardy Cups: 22; 1930, 1934, 1935, 1936, 1937, 1941, 1974, 1989, 1990, 1991, 1994, 1996, 1998, 1999, 2002, 2004, 2005, 2006, 2018, 2021, 2022, 2025 (1965* - shared year)
- Hec Crighton winners: 1, Dave Pickett

Current uniform
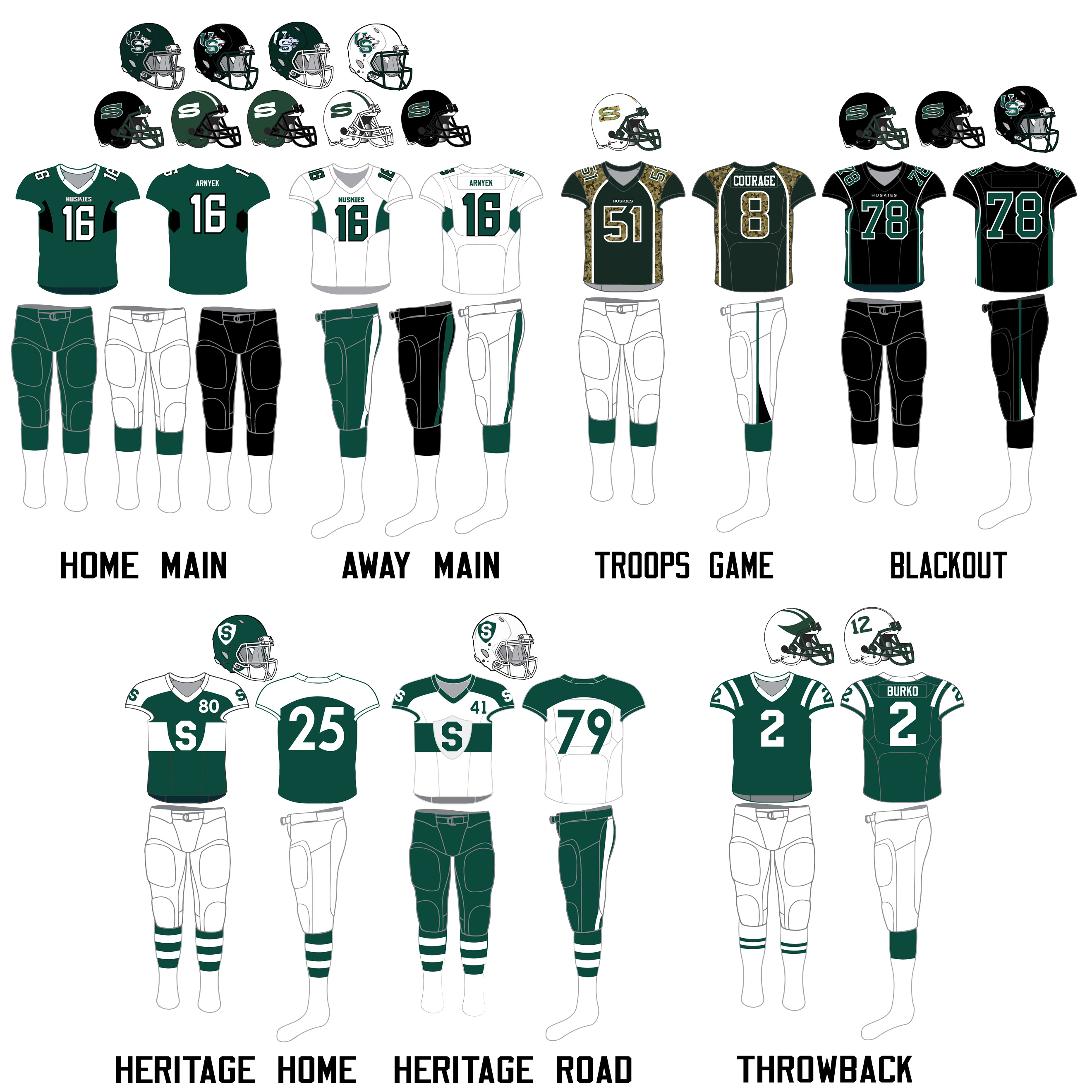
- Colours: Green, Black, and White
- Outfitter: Nike
- Rivals: Regina Rams; Calgary Dinos
- Website: huskies.usask.ca/football

The Saskatchewan Huskies football team represents the University of Saskatchewan in U Sports football that competes in the Canada West Universities Athletic Association conference of U Sports. The program has won the Vanier Cup national championship three times, in 1990, 1996 and 1998. The Huskies became only the second U Sports team to advance to three consecutive Vanier Cup games, after the Saint Mary's Huskies, but lost all three games from 2004 until 2006. The team has won the most Hardy Trophy titles in Canada West, having won a total of 22 times.

The 2006 Huskies became only the third team to play in a Vanier Cup that their school was hosting, when the University of Saskatchewan hosted the 42nd Vanier Cup. The Toronto Varsity Blues were the first when they won two Vanier Cups in 1965 and 1993. Saskatchewan also became the first western school to host the national championship game.

== Recent regular season results ==
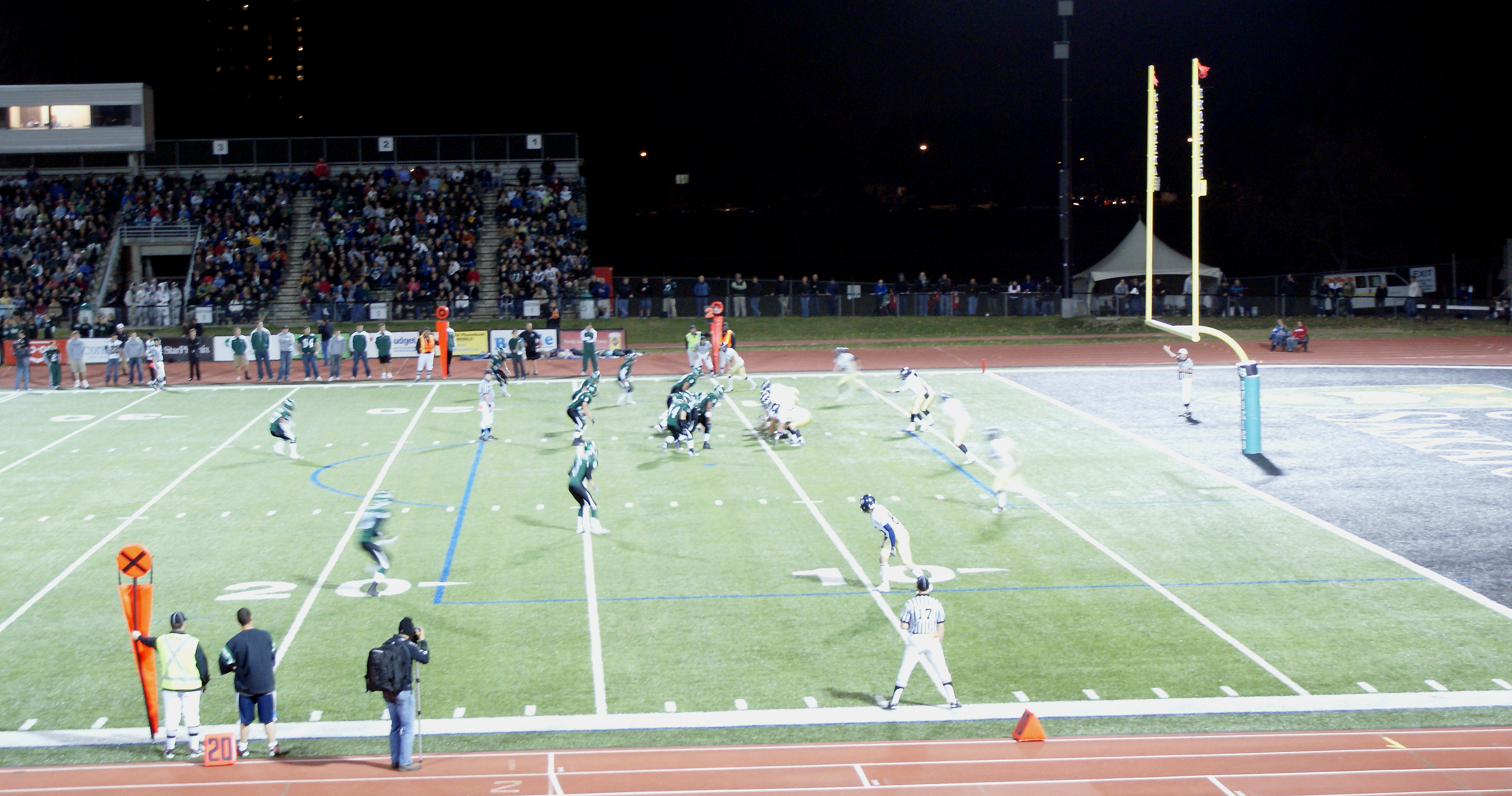
Huskies vs Thunderbirds game, 2008

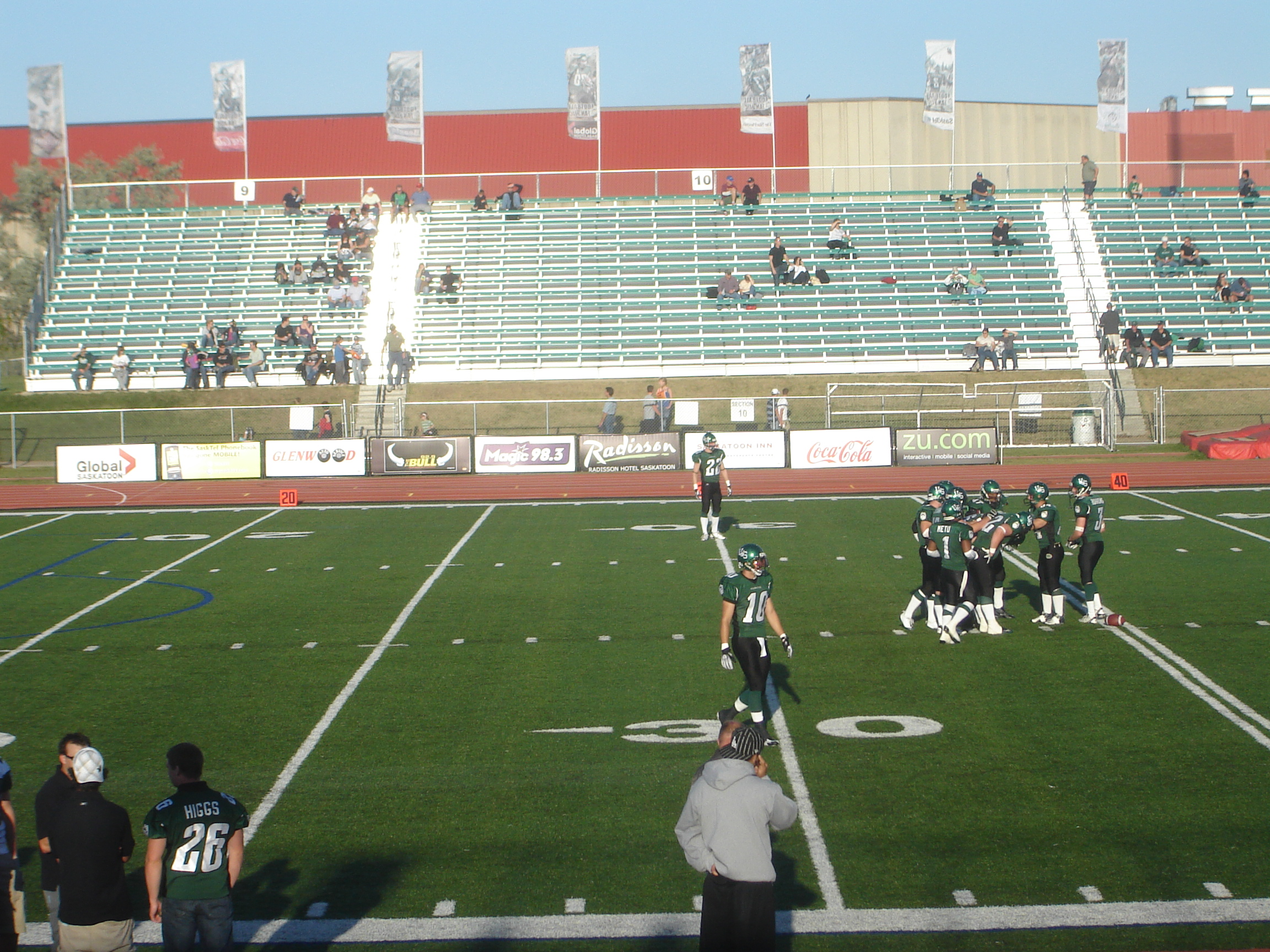
Huskies warming up, 2008

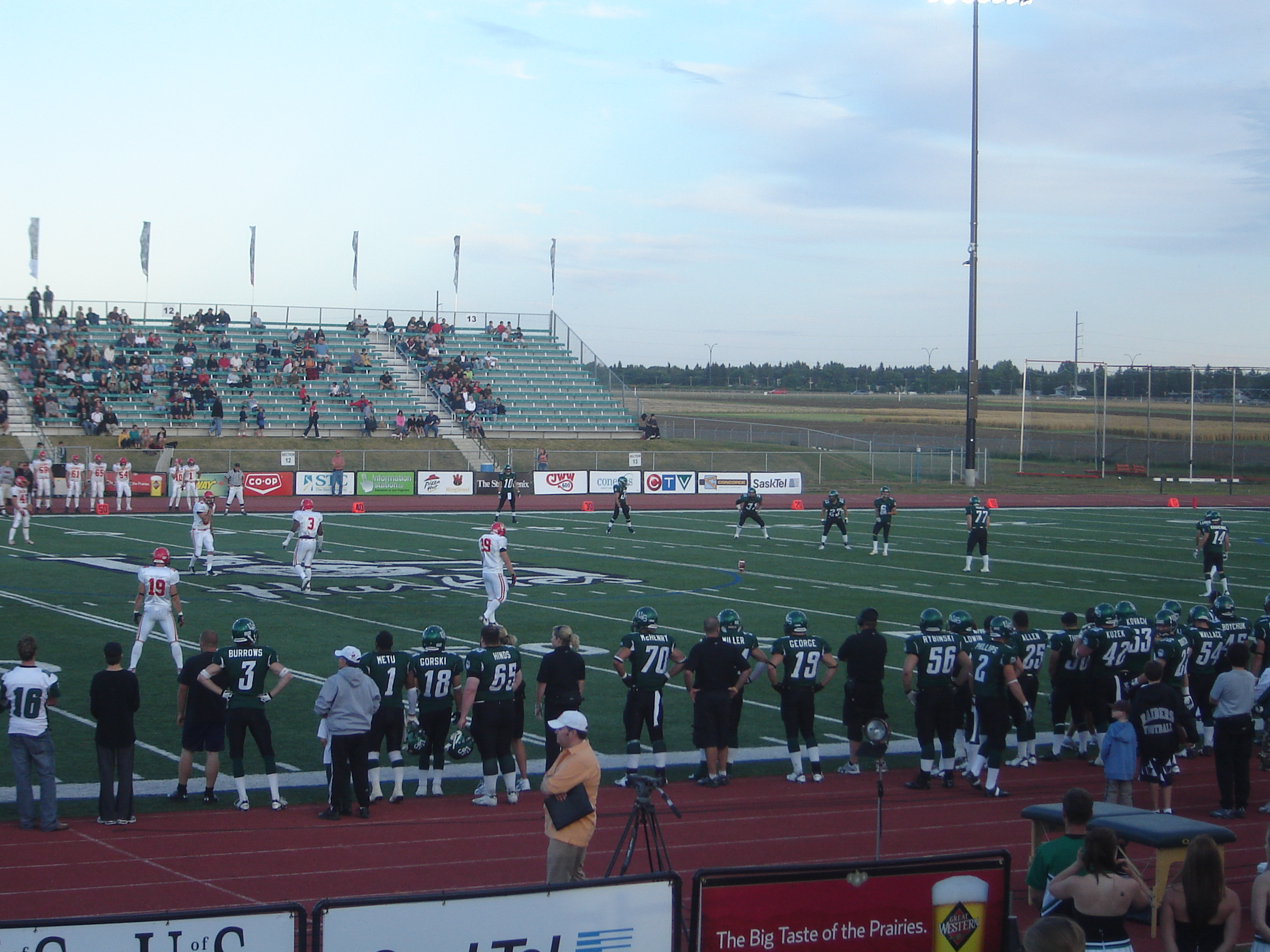
Kick off

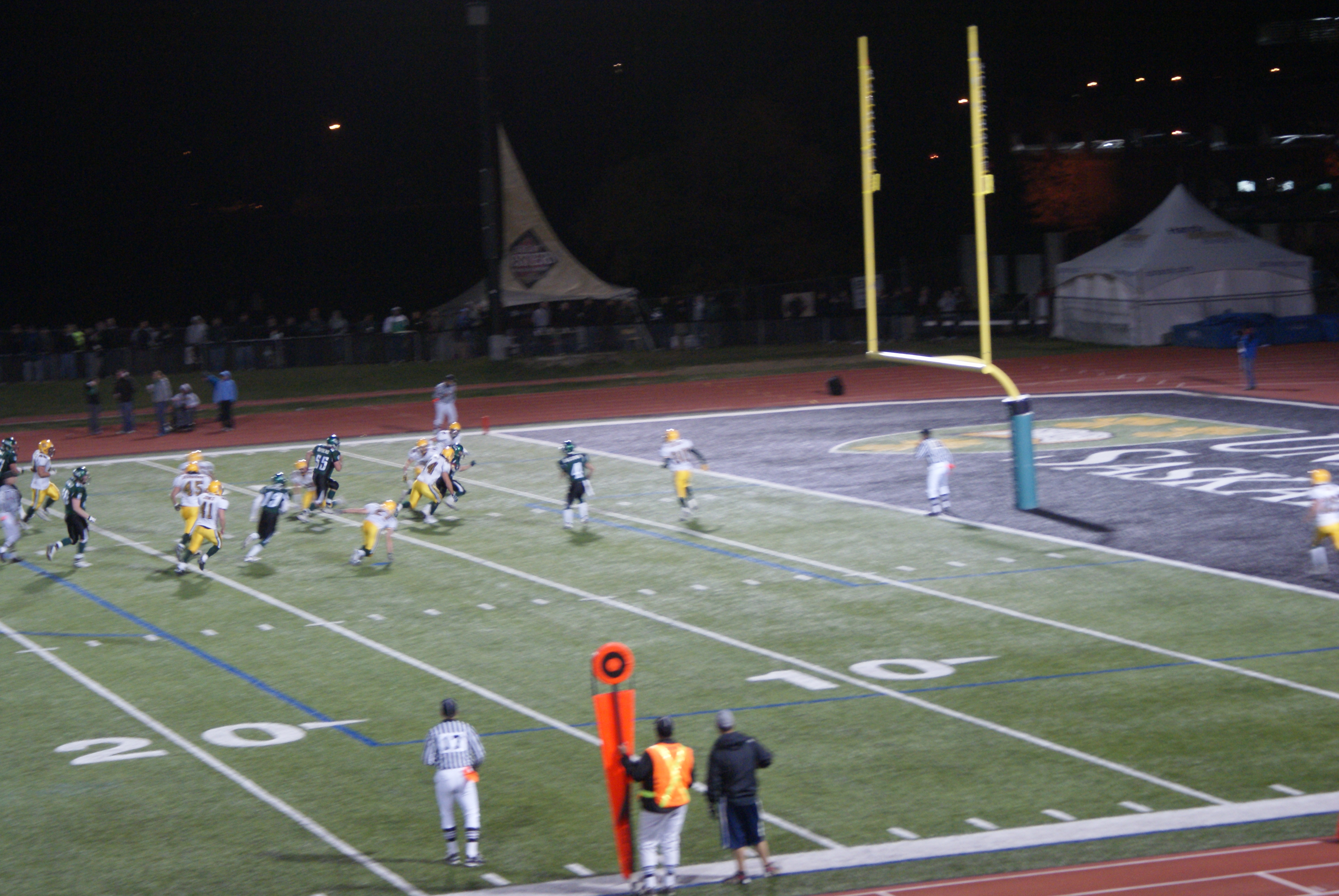
Huskies touchdown vs Alberta

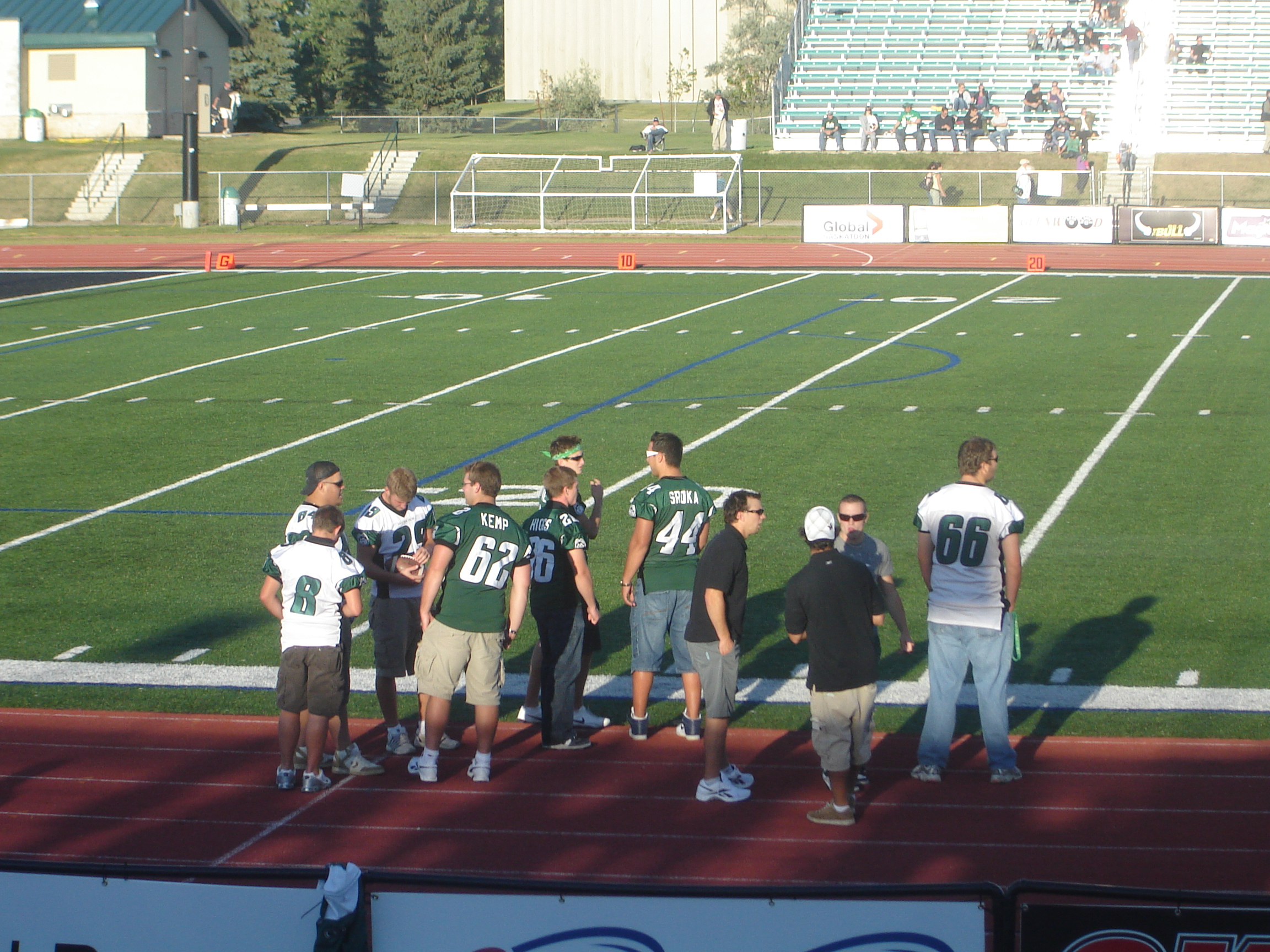
Huskies players outside the field

Season	Games	W	L	T/OTL	PCT	PF	PA	Standing	Playoffs
2001	8	5	3	0	0.625	200	172	3rd in CW	Lost to Regina Rams in semi-final 58–31
2002	8	4	4	0	0.500	162	159	4th in CW	Defeated Manitoba Bisons in semi-final 37–18; Defeated Regina Rams in Hardy Cup 44–28; Defeated McGill Redmen in Mitchell Bowl 22–0; Lost to Saint Mary's Huskies in 38th Vanier Cup 33–21
2003	8	8	0	0	1.000	231	124	1st in CW	Lost to Alberta Golden Bears in semi-final 10–4
2004	8	6	2	0	0.750	276	91	2nd in CW	Defeated UBC Thunderbirds in semi-final 39–0; Defeated Alberta Golden Bears in Hardy Cup 21–20; Defeated Saint Mary's Huskies in Mitchell Bowl 31–16; Lost to Laval Rouge et Or in 40th Vanier Cup 7–1
2005	8	8	0	0	1.000	294	99	1st in CW	Defeated UBC Thunderbirds in semi-final 32–6; Defeated Alberta Golden Bears in Hardy Cup 30–17; Defeated Laval Rouge et Or in Mitchell Bowl 29–27; Lost to Wilfrid Laurier Golden Hawks in 41st Vanier Cup 24–23
2006	8	6	2	0	0.750	282	148	2nd in CW	Defeated UBC Thunderbirds in semi-final 35–16; Defeated Manitoba Bisons in Hardy Cup 32–15; Defeated Ottawa Gee-Gees in Mitchell Bowl 35–28; Lost to Laval Rouge et Or in 42nd Vanier Cup 13–8
2007	8	5	3	–	0.625	213	131	3rd in CW	Lost to Regina Rams in semi-final 19–13
2008	8	6	2	–	0.750	217	83	1st in CW	Lost to Simon Fraser Clan in semi-final 40–30
2009	8	7	1	–	0.875	211	112	1st in CW	Defeated Regina Rams in semi-final 53–23; Lost to Calgary Dinos in Hardy Cup 39–38
2010	8	6	2	–	0.750	317	179	1st in CW	Lost to Alberta Golden Bears in semi-final 31–30
2011	8	5	3	–	0.625	238	140	3rd in CW	Lost to UBC Thunderbirds in semi-final 27–22
2012	8	5	3	–	0.625	252	218	3rd in CW	Lost to Regina Rams in semi-final 31–9
2013	8	5	3	–	0.625	227	204	3rd in CW	Lost to Manitoba Bisons in semi-final 37–36
2014	8	6	2	–	0.750	249	226	2nd in CW	Lost to Manitoba Bisons in semi-final 47–39
2015	8	3	5	–	0.375	240	300	4th in CW	Lost to Calgary Dinos in semi-final 37–29
2016	8	5	3	–	0.625	261	205	3rd in CW	Lost to Calgary Dinos in semi-final 47–17
2017	8	2	6	–	0.250	245	286	5th in CW	Out of playoffs
2018	8	5	3	–	0.625	258	174	3rd in CW	Defeated UBC Thunderbirds in semi-final 31–28; Defeated Calgary Dinos in Hardy Cup 43–18; Lost to Western Mustangs in Mitchell Bowl 47–24
2019	8	5	3	–	0.625	257	161	2nd in CW	Defeated Alberta Golden Bears in semi-final 28–23; Lost to Calgary Dinos in Hardy Cup 29–4
2020	Season cancelled due to COVID-19 pandemic								
2021	6	5	1	–	0.833	217	128	1st in CW	Defeated UBC Thunderbirds in semi-final 39–17; Defeated Manitoba Bisons in Hardy Cup 45–17; Defeated Montreal Carabins in Uteck Bowl 14–10; Lost to Western Mustangs in 56th Vanier Cup 27–21
2022	8	7	1	–	0.875	241	119	1st in CW	Defeated Manitoba Bisons in semi-final 37–9; Defeated UBC Thunderbirds in Hardy Cup 23–8; Defeated St. Francis Xavier X-Men in Uteck Bowl 36–19; Lost to Laval Rouge et Or in 57th Vanier Cup 30–24
2023	8	5	3	–	0.625	229	149	3rd in CW	Lost to Alberta Golden Bears in semi-final 40–17
2024	8	5	3	–	0.625	233	233	3rd in CW	Defeated UBC Thunderbirds in semi-final 38–33; Lost to Regina Rams in Hardy Cup 19–14
2025	8	7	1	–	0.875	253	143	1st in CW	Defeated UBC Thunderbirds in semi-final 26–7; Defeated Regina Rams in Hardy Cup 25–24; Defeated Queen's Gaels in Mitchell Bowl 22–11; Lost to Montreal Carabins in 60th Vanier Cup 30–16
2026	8	6	2	–	0.750	287	229	2nd in CW	Lost to Regina Rams in semi-final 39–27

== National postseason results ==
Vanier Cup Era (1965–present)
Year	Game	Opponent	Result
1974	Churchill Bowl	Western	L 17–41
1989	Churchill Bowl; Vanier Cup	Queen's; Western	W 30–10; L 10–35
1990	Churchill Bowl; Vanier Cup	Bishop's; Saint Mary's	W 41–13; W 24–21
1991	Atlantic Bowl	Mount Allison	L 14–31
1994	Atlantic Bowl; Vanier Cup	Saint Mary's; Western	W 35–24; L 40–50
1996	Churchill Bowl; Vanier Cup	Guelph; St. Francis Xavier	W 33–9; W 31–12
1998	Churchill Bowl; Vanier Cup	Western; Concordia	W 33–17; W 24–17
1999	Churchill Bowl	Laval	L 21–27
2002	Mitchell Bowl; Vanier Cup	McGill; Saint Mary's	W 22–0; L 21–33
2004	Mitchell Bowl; Vanier Cup	Saint Mary's; Laval	W 31–16; L 1–7
2005	Mitchell Bowl; Vanier Cup	Laval; Laurier	W 29–27; L 23–24
2006	Mitchell Bowl; Vanier Cup	Ottawa; Laval	W 35–28; L 8–13
2018	Mitchell Bowl	Western	L 24–47
2021	Uteck Bowl; Vanier Cup	Montreal; Western	W 14–10; L 21–27
2022	Uteck Bowl; Vanier Cup	St. Francis Xavier; Laval	W 36–19; L 24–30
2025	Mitchell Bowl; Vanier Cup	Queen's; Montreal	W 22–11; L 16–30

Saskatchewan is 12–4 in national semi-final games and 3–9 in the Vanier Cup.

== Head coaches ==
Coach name	Tenure	Notes
A.G. Adamson	1913	
Leo Convey	1914	
John Bracken	1915–1917	
No team	1918	
Beaton Squires	1919	
Ed Nagle	1920	
Stan Wilson	1921	
Fred Loomis	1922	
Ed Nagle	1923	
Ken King	1924	
Ed Nagle	1925	
Ken King	1926–1927	
Kent Phillips	1928–1937	
Colb McEown	1938–1939	
Kent Phillips	1940–1941	
Colb McEown	1941–1944	
Kent Phillips	1945	
Bob Arn	1946	
Jack Lawrence	1947	
Bill Neale and Fran Pyne	1948–1949	
No team	1950–1958	
Howard Nixon	1959	
Barry Roseborough	1960–1962	
Ross Hetherington	1963	
Bill Bolonchuk	1964–1966	
Dan Marisi	1967–1968	
Al Ledingham	1969–1971	
Bob Laycoe	1972	
Val Schneider	1973–1978	
Bob Brennan	1979	
Val Schneider	1980–1983	
Brian Towriss	1984–2016	
Scott Flory	2017–present	

== Saskatchewan Huskies in the CFL ==
As of the start of the 2026 CFL season, 10 former Huskies players are on CFL teams' rosters:

- Nathan Cherry, BC Lions
- Josh Hagerty, BC Lions
- George Idoko, Calgary Stampeders
- Nelson Lokombo, Saskatchewan Roughriders
- Patrick Neufeld, Winnipeg Blue Bombers
- Lane Novak, Winnipeg Blue Bombers
- Charlie Parks, Ottawa Redblacks
- Riley Pickett, BC Lions
- Daniel Wiebe, Saskatchewan Roughriders
- Nick Wiebe, Saskatchewan Roughriders

== Award winners ==
Player	Pos.	National awards	Conference awards
Trent Bagnall			Top Defensive Player (1995)
Sheldon Ball	QB	Mitchell Bowl MVP (2002)	
Dylan Barker	S		Student-Athlete Award (2006)
Steve Bilan	QB	Mitchell Bowl MVP (2004)	Frank Gnup Memorial Trophy (2004)
Rob Dutton			Outstanding Lineman (1989)
David Earl	QB	Vanier Cup MVP (1990); Churchill Bowl MVP (1990)	
Dan Farthing	SB	Peter Gorman Trophy (1987)	Rookie of the Year (1987); Frank Gnup Memorial Trophy (1988)
Phil Guebert	S, PK	Churchill Bowl MVP (1990)	
Ben Heenan	OL		Rookie of the Year (2008)
Seth Hundeby	LB	Presidents' Trophy (2025)	Top Defensive Player (2025)
Mike Letendre	LB	Presidents' Trophy	Top Defensive Player (1999)
Trevor Ludtke	LB	Vanier Cup MVP (1998)	
Byron McCorkell			Outstanding Lineman (1988)
Scott McHenry	SB		Rookie of the Year (2005)
Aaron Moser	DE		Outstanding Lineman (2000)
Warren Muzika	LB	Vanier Cup Defensive MVP (1996); Presidents' Trophy (1998)	Top Defensive Player (1997, 1998)
Laurence Nixon	QB		Frank Gnup Memorial Trophy (2010)
Mason Nyhus	QB	Uteck Bowl MVP (2022)	Player of the Year (2022)
Tyler O'Gorman	RB	Mitchell Bowl MVP (2006)	
Kim Pasloski			Top Defensive Player (1990)
Dave Pickett	QB	Hec Crighton Trophy (1973)	Frank Gnup Memorial Trophy (1973)
Barry Radcliffe	Assistant coach	Gino Fracas Award (2002)	
Jordan Rempel	OL		Outstanding Lineman (2006)
James Repesse	DT	J. P. Metras Trophy (1996)	Rookie of the Year (1994); Outstanding Lineman (1996)
Doug Rozon	LB	Vanier Cup Defensive MVP (1998); Churchill Bowl MVP (1998)	
Joe Saul	DE	Churchill Bowl MVP (1996)	
Brent Schneider	QB	Vanier Cup MVP (1994, 1996); Atlantic Bowl MVP (1994)	Frank Gnup Memorial Trophy (1993, 1994, 1996)
Travis Serke	OL		Outstanding Lineman (1993)
David Stevens	RB	Mitchell Bowl MVP (2005)	Frank Gnup Memorial Trophy (2005)
Brian Towriss	Head coach	Frank Tindall Trophy (1994)	Coach of the Year (1988, 1994, 1996, 1998, 2003, 2005, 2010)
Taylor Wallace	LB		Top Defensive Player (2009)
Ken Zaparniuk		Churchill Bowl MVP (1989)	

== Notable alumni ==
Player	Pos.	Professional team(s)	Notes
Dylan Barker	S	Hamilton Tiger-Cats	First overall draft choice in 2008 CFL draft
Kelly Bates	G	BC Lions; Winnipeg Blue Bombers; Saskatchewan Roughriders; Edmonton Eskimos	Former head coach, Simon Fraser Clan
Graeme Bell	RB	Winnipeg Blue Bombers; Edmonton Eskimos; Saskatchewan Roughriders	
Jamie Boreham	P	Hamilton Tiger-Cats; Saskatchewan Roughriders; Toronto Argonauts; Edmonton Eskimos; Winnipeg Blue Bombers	
Rob Bresciani	SB	Saskatchewan Roughriders; Ottawa Rough Riders	
Errol Brown	S	Saskatchewan Roughriders; Winnipeg Blue Bombers	
Ivan Brown	DE	Montreal Alouettes; Hamilton Tiger-Cats	
Darrell Burko	LB	Toronto Argonauts; Hamilton Tiger-Cats	
Hubert Buydens	OL		Member of Canadian men's rugby team at the 2011 Rugby World Cup; Professional Rugby Player with Manawatu Turbos of New Zealand
Glenn Carson	OL	Edmonton Eskimos	
Ben Coakwell	RB		2014 Winter Olympian, 4-Man Bobsleigh
Tyson Craiggs	LB	BC Lions	
Jason Crumb	DB	BC Lions	
Mike Crumb	DB	BC Lions; Toronto Argonauts	
Ewan Currie	DL/LB		Winner of Rolling Stone's Choose the Cover contest, Lead singer of The Sheepdogs
Duane Dmytryshyn	SB	Saskatchewan Roughriders; Toronto Argonauts	
Jade Etienne	WR	Winnipeg Blue Bombers; Saskatchewan Roughriders	
Dan Farthing	SB	Saskatchewan Roughriders	
Scott Flory	G	Montreal Alouettes	
Jerry Friesen	LB	Montreal Alouettes; Saskatchewan Roughriders	
Jordan Gaertner	WR	Edmonton Eskimos	
Larry Giles	WR	Calgary Stampeders	
Brian Guebert	DE/FB	Winnipeg Blue Bombers	Member of Canada national American football team at the 2011 IFAF World Cup
Jeff Hassler	RB		Member of Canadian U20 rugby team at the 2010 IRB Junior World Rugby Trophy; Professional Rugby Player with Ospreys of Wales
Ben Heenan	OL	Saskatchewan Roughriders	First overall draft choice in 2012 CFL draft
Paul Hickie	P	Edmonton Eskimos; Saskatchewan Roughriders	
Nathan Hoffart	SB	Saskatchewan Roughriders; Toronto Argonauts	
John Hoffman	DB	Saskatchewan Roughriders	
Matt Kellett	P/K	Edmonton Eskimos; BC Lions; Montreal Alouettes; Ottawa Renegades	
Rory Kohlert	WR	Hamilton Tiger-Cats; Winnipeg Blue Bombers	
John Konihowski	WR	Edmonton Eskimos; Winnipeg Blue Bombers	
Mike Lazecki	P	Saskatchewan Roughriders	
Kevin Lefsrud	C	Montreal Alouettes; Edmonton Eskimos	
Terry Lehne	DB	Hamilton Tiger-Cats	
Trevor Ludtke	LB	Winnipeg Blue Bombers	
Gene Makowsky	OT	Saskatchewan Roughriders	
Jim Manz	RB	Saskatchewan Roughriders; Winnipeg Blue Bombers	
Bryce McCall	DB	Saskatchewan Roughriders	Member of Canada national American football team at the 2011 IFAF World Cup
Keenan McDougall	DB	Calgary Stampeders	
Rhett McLane	G	Edmonton Eskimos	
Warren Muzika	LB	Hamilton Tiger-Cats; Winnipeg Blue Bombers	
Al Neufeld	OL	Ottawa Rough Riders	
Patrick Neufeld	OL	Saskatchewan Roughriders; Winnipeg Blue Bombers	
Jeff Piercy	RB	Montreal Alouettes; Hamilton Tiger-Cats	
Doug Redl	OG	Hamilton Tiger-Cats	
Scott Redl	OL/DL	Saskatchewan Roughriders	
Ryan Reid	QB	New Haven Ninjas; San Jose SaberCats	First Huskie to play pro in an American league
Chad Rempel	WR/LS	Edmonton Eskimos; Winnipeg Blue Bombers; Hamilton Tiger-Cats; Montreal Alouettes; Toronto Argonauts; Saskatchewan Roughriders	
Jordan Rempel	OT	Hamilton Tiger-Cats; Saskatchewan Roughriders	
Lyndon Rush			2010 Olympic Bronze Medal, 4-Man Bobsleigh and 2010 Winter Olympian, 2-Man Bobsleigh; 2014 Winter Olympian, 2-Man and 4-Man Bobsleigh
David Rybinski	DL		Member of Canada national American football team at the 2011 IFAF World Cup
Grant Shaw	K/P	Toronto Argonauts; Edmonton Eskimos	
Levi Steinhauer	DL	Saskatchewan Roughriders	
David Stevens	RB		Member of Canada national American football team at the 2011 IFAF World Cup
Marshall Toner	SB	Calgary Stampeders	
Kelly Trithart	LB	Saskatchewan Roughriders	
George Voelk	DL	Montreal Alouettes	
Gene Wall	RB	Toronto Argonauts; Hamilton Tiger-Cats	
Dale West	DB	Saskatchewan Roughriders	
Ray Wiens	OL	Winnipeg Blue Bombers	
Paul Woldu	DB	Montreal Alouettes; Saskatchewan Roughriders	
Jeff Yausie	DB	Calgary Stampeders; Ottawa Rough Riders	
