= Tim Allan (Canadian football) =

Canadian football player (born 1955)

Profile
- Position: Centre

Personal information
- Born: May 29, 1955 (age 71)
- Listed height: 6 ft 1 in (1.85 m)
- Listed weight: 240 lb (109 kg)

Career information
- University: Toronto
- CFL draft: 1978

Career history
- 1978: Winnipeg Blue Bombers
- 1978: Toronto Argonauts

Tim Allan (born May 29, 1955) is a Canadian former professional football offensive tackle who played for the Winnipeg Blue Bombers and Toronto Argonauts of the Canadian Football League. In 1978, he played in six regular season games between the two teams. While with the Argonauts, he recovered a fumble for a touchdown. He played at the University of Louisville and the University of Toronto.
