= Gerry Palmer =

American gridiron football player (1930–1984)

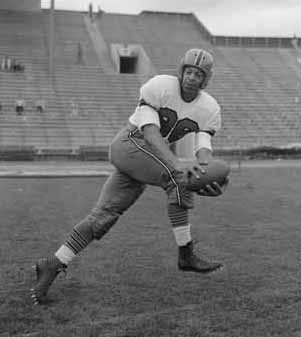
- Palmer in 1954

No. 75
- Positions: Halfback, Defensive back

Personal information
- Born: July 23, 1930; Toledo, Ohio, U.S.
- Died: May 6, 1984 (aged 53); Sylvania, Ohio, U.S.
- Listed height: 6 ft 0 in (1.83 m)
- Listed weight: 190 lb (86 kg)

Career information
- College: Toledo Rockets

Career history
- 1952–1953: Winnipeg Blue Bombers
- 1954: BC Lions

Gerald B. Palmer (July 23, 1930 – May 6, 1984) was an American professional football player who played for the Winnipeg Blue Bombers and BC Lions. He played college football at the University of Toledo, where he earned a degree in business administration in 1952.
