= Beaton Squires =

Harvard Crimson
- Position: Tackle/Guard

Personal information
- Born: December 16, 1881; Britannia, Newfoundland
- Died: February 8, 1962 (aged 81)
- Listed height: 5 ft 11 in (1.80 m)
- Listed weight: 202 lb (92 kg)

Career information
- College: Harvard (1903–1905)

Awards and highlights
- Consensus All-American (1905)

Beaton Hall Squires, LL.B, BA (December 16, 1881 – February 8, 1962) was an All-American football player and a noted Canadian lawyer. Born in rural Newfoundland, Squires became a star football player at Harvard University and was selected by Walter Camp as his first-team All-American at the right guard position in 1905. Squires received his law degree from Harvard and later became one of the leading solicitors in the Canadian province of Saskatchewan.

== Early life ==
Squires was born in Britannia, Newfoundland to Congregational minister John Squires and his wife Amelia (Hippisley) Squires. After graduating from Methodist College, he prepared for college at St. John's Academy.

== Harvard ==
He came to Harvard on a fellowship given by the Canadian government. Squires received both BA and LL.B degrees from Harvard.

Squires made the Harvard football team despite his inexperience with the American game, which was vastly different from the form football played in Newfoundland. He was a starting guard on the freshman team and a reserve tackle on the varsity squad his sophomore season. In 1904, he was the team's starting right guard. Coach Bill Reid described Squires as "a thoroughly respectable and decent fellow, although he is perhaps a little thick headed." According to Reid, Squires had a job in 1904 as a conductor on Boston's electric railway. When a drunk passenger refused to pay his fare, Squires grabbed him by the nape of the neck and the trousers and threw him to the ground. A lawsuit filed by the man was dismissed, but Squires was dismissed by the company with the comment, "You are too strong for us; come back next year."

Squires became a star as a senior in 1905 and was selected as a consensus All-American at the end of the season. In the years prior to the establishment of professional football as a major sport, selection as one of the eleven players on the All-American team marked the highest level of accomplishment in the sport. Squires won the All-American honor despite having broken his thumb in a game against Bates College. As a senior in 1905, Squires was also selected as the captain of the Harvard football team, the first time a citizen of a country other than the United States received the honor. At the time, the Philadelphia Inquirer reported

Beaton H. Squires, Harvard's giant guard may be elected captain of the football eleven next year. It will be the first time that a man who is not a citizen of the United States will lead a Harvard football squad.

On the eve of his election as Harvard's captain, a New York newspaper noted that, despite growing up in rural Newfoundland and not being a society man, his skill and leadership on the field supported his candidacy

Born and reared in the country, the big fellow was proof against every accident. No matter how hard he was used he never seemed to mind it in the least, and fairly grew fat on the same diet which left others sprawling behind him on the ground. The reason undoubtedly was that the other men were nearly all city boys. Squires' steady and consistent work makes him a leading candidate for the captaincy next year, despite the fact that he is in no sense of the word a society man.

In its coverage of the 1905 Harvard-Yale game, the Philadelphia Inquirer compared the "sturdy Squires" to a steam shovel smashing into the Yale line.

During the 1905 season, while Squires was captain of the Harvard team, a national debate erupted over the violent nature of the sport of football. Harvard's president, Charles William Eliot, proposed eliminating the sport from college campuses, and even President Theodore Roosevelt, a Harvard alumnus, weighed in on the debate. In an editorial published in The Boston Journal, Squires wrote in support of the sport. Squires argued: "Let football alone. It is a grand game, a game which requires all the best qualities a man should possess, strength, endurance, quick perception, and self-control." Squires supported rule changes to reduce the likelihood of serious injury, including a 20-yard penalty for unnecessary roughness, creation of a body of officials to more clearly define unnecessary roughness, use of two umpires to more carefully watch for unnecessary roughness, a ban on tackling below the knees, and creation of a five-yard safe zone for a player catching the ball. However, Squires opposed proposals to more dramatically alter the rules of the game, noting, "You cannot make a parlor game out of football."

After his playing days, Squires remained involved with football as coach of Beverly High School (1907–1911) and the University of Saskatchewan (1919).

== Legal practice ==
After receiving his law degree, Squires practiced as a lawyer in Boston from 1908 to 1912. He moved to Saskatoon in 1913 and entered the firm of Maclean, Jordan, Hollinrake, and Moxon. He became one of the leading lawyers in Saskatchewan. He became a member of the firm in 1914, but left in 1916 and practised on his own with an office in the Royal Bank of Canada Building in Saskatoon. In 1923, he and Andrew Sibbald formed a partnership that became the law firm of Squires & Sibbald. Soon thereafter, he returned to Massachusetts and practiced law there until the early 1950s.

== Personal life ==
In 1913, Squires married Edith Louise Gaffield, a native of Brookline, Massachusetts. She predeceased him in 1956. He died on February 8, 1962, at the age of 80.
