= Brian Towriss =

Canadian football coach (born 1956)

Profile
- Position: Head coach

Personal information
- Born: May 24, 1956 (age 70); Moose Jaw, Saskatchewan

Career information
- University: Saskatchewan

Career history
- 1980–1983: Saskatchewan Huskies (AC)
- 1984–2016: Saskatchewan Huskies (HC)

Awards and highlights
- 1994 CIS Coach of the Year; 3× Vanier Cup champion (1990, 1996, 1998)
- Canadian Football Hall of Fame (Class of 2017)

Brian Towriss (born May 24, 1956) is the former head coach for the University of Saskatchewan's football team, the Saskatchewan Huskies. Towriss became Saskatchewan's head coach in 1984 and became CIS football's winningest head coach in 2011, surpassing Larry Haylor with his 170th overall win. He resigned as head coach on December 19, 2016 with a U Sports football record 196 wins that held until 2022, and 315 games coached. He reached the Vanier Cup finals nine times as a head coach, having won three of those in 1990, 1996, 1998. Collegiately, he also played CIS football for the Saskatchewan Huskies. He was inducted into the Canadian Football Hall of Fame in 2017 as a builder.
