= Barry Roseborough =

Canadian football player (1932–1992)

Profile
- Position: Quarterback

Personal information
- Born: April 30, 1932; Saskatoon, Saskatchewan, Canada
- Died: March 14, 1992 (aged 59); Royal Oak, Michigan, U.S.
- Listed height: 6 ft 0 in (1.83 m)
- Listed weight: 205 lb (93 kg)

Career history
- 1956–1958: Winnipeg Blue Bombers

Awards and highlights
- Grey Cup champion (1958)

Barry W. Roseborough (April 30, 1932 – March 14, 1992) was a Canadian professional football player who played for the Winnipeg Blue Bombers. He won the Grey Cup with them in 1958. He played college football at the University of North Dakota. After his CFL career, he coached the Saskatchewan Huskies football team at the University of Saskatchewan from 1960 to 1962. He also attended the University of Michigan and Western Michigan University, eventually getting a Ph.D. He died in a hospital in Michigan in 1992.
