= Britannia, Newfoundland and Labrador =

Human settlement in Canada

Coordinates: 48.145°N 53.719°W

Location of Britannia in Newfoundland and Labrador

Britannia is a designated place in the Canadian province of Newfoundland and Labrador. It is on Trinity Bay and is part of the local service district of Random Island West.

== Geography ==
Britannia is in Newfoundland within Subdivision L of Division No. 7.

== Demographics ==
As a designated place in the 2016 Census of Population conducted by Statistics Canada, Britannia recorded a population of 85 living in 37 of its 60 total private dwellings, a change of -9.6% from its 2011 population of 94. With a land area of 4.25 km^{2} (1.64 sq mi), it had a population density of 20.0/km^{2} (51.8/sq mi) in 2016.

== See also ==
- List of communities in Newfoundland and Labrador
- List of designated places in Newfoundland and Labrador
