= 26th Vanier Cup =

1990 Canadian university football championship

Saskatchewan Huskies	Saint Mary's Huskies
(6–2)	(6–1)
24	21
Head coach: Brian Towriss	Head coach: Larry Uteck
	1	2	3	4	Total
Saskatchewan Huskies	0	0	0	24	24
Saint Mary's Huskies	0	0	0	21	21
- Date: November 24, 1990
- Stadium: SkyDome
- Location: Toronto
- Ted Morris Memorial Trophy: David Earl, Saskatchewan
- Attendance: 26,846

The 26th Vanier Cup was played on November 24, 1990, at the SkyDome in Toronto, Ontario, and decided the CIAU football champion for the 1990 season. The Saskatchewan Huskies won their first ever championship by defeating the Saint Mary's Huskies by a score of 24–21 in the first ever Vanier Cup game between two schools with the same team nickname.
