= Val Schneider =

Canadian football player, coach and administrator (1944–2025)

Profile
- Positions: Fullback, linebacker, punter

Personal information
- Born: January 25, 1944; Germany
- Died: October 23, 2025 (aged 81); Edmonton, Alberta, Canada

Career information
- University: Alberta

Career history

Playing
- 1963–1968: Alberta Golden Bears

Coaching
- 1969–1973: Red Deer Packers
- 1973–1978: University of Saskatchewan Huskies
- 1980–1983: University of Saskatchewan Huskies

Operations
- 1980–1991: University of Saskatchewan (Athletic Director)
- 1999–2012: Canada West Universities Athletic Association (Executive Director)

Awards and highlights
- Vanier Cup champion (1967)

Valkmar Erich "Val" Schneider (January 25, 1944 – October 23, 2025) was a Canadian football player, coach and administrator.

== Early life and playing career ==
Schneider was born in Germany and raised in Edmonton, Alberta. He attended Victoria Composite High School before enrolling at the University of Alberta. He received a Bachelor of Physical Education degree in 1966 and a Master of Arts degree in physical education in 1969.

He played five seasons for the Alberta Golden Bears football team between 1963 and 1968, missing the 1966 season while teaching. He played fullback, linebacker and punter, and was a four-time Western Intercollegiate Football League (WIFL) all-star. He was co-captain from 1965 through 1968.

Alberta won four consecutive WIFL championships during Schneider's time with the team and reached the national final in 1965. In 1967, the Golden Bears defeated McMaster 10–9 in the Vanier Cup, winning the university's first national championship. Schneider was named the game's most valuable player and received the Ted Morris Memorial Trophy. He punted 13 times for 513 yards in the game while playing on both sides of the ball.

== Coaching and administration ==
In 1969, Schneider joined the faculty of Red Deer College and became head football coach of the Red Deer Packers. He also coached the Red Deer College Kings hockey team.

Schneider joined the University of Saskatchewan's Faculty of Physical Education in 1973. He served as head coach of the Saskatchewan Huskies football team from 1973 to 1978 and again from 1980 to 1983. He also coached the Huskies wrestling team for two years. During his time with the Huskies, he received the program's Coach of the Year award in 1974–75 and 1975–76.

Schneider later returned to the Huskies as an assistant football coach. He was on the coaching staff of teams that reached the Vanier Cup in 1989 and 1994 and won the championship in 1990 and 1996. He was also a guest coach at Saskatchewan Roughriders training camp in 1977 and 1978.

From 1980 to 1991, Schneider was athletic director at the University of Saskatchewan and at the same time served as assistant dean of its College of Physical Education, later the College of Kinesiology. He also helped establish and coordinate the Huskie Athletic Endowment Fund.

Schneider was involved in football development beyond the university. He served on the Coaches Working Committee of the Canadian Amateur Football Association and, with Jim Donlevy and Gino Fracas, worked on coaching manuals for Canadian football. He also served on the board of Canadian Interuniversity Sport.

He later became executive director of Canada West and remained in that position until his retirement in 2012. In 2011 he was listed as the association's executive director in its league directory.

== Honours ==
Schneider was inducted into the Vanier Cup Honour Roll in 1987 for his contributions as a player, coach and administrator. He was inducted into the University of Alberta Sports Wall of Fame in 1999 and the University of Saskatchewan Athletic Wall of Fame in 2007.

In 2003, Schneider received the Austin-Matthews Award from Canadian Interuniversity Sport for his contributions to university sport.

The 1990 Saskatchewan Huskies football team, on whose coaching staff Schneider served, was inducted into both the Saskatoon Sports Hall of Fame and Saskatchewan Sports Hall of Fame. Schneider was later the first inductee into the Canada West Hall of Fame when it was established in 2019, entering as a builder.

== Personal life and death ==
Schneider was married to Gloria and had three children. His son Brent Schneider played quarterback for the Saskatchewan Huskies and was the Vanier Cup most valuable player in 1994 and 1996.

Schneider died in Edmonton on October 23, 2025, at the age of 81.
