= Marco Iadeluca =

Canadian gridiron football coach (born 1972)

Montreal Carabins
- Title: Head coach, offensive coordinator

Personal information
- Born: June 29, 1972 (age 54)

Career information
- CJFL: St-Léonard Cougars

Career history
- 1998–2008: St-Léonard Cougars (Offensive coordinator)
- 2009: Collège André-Grasset (Offensive coordinator) (Assistant head coach)
- 2010: Laval Rouge et Or (Offensive coordinator)
- 2011–2017: Montreal Carabins (Offensive coordinator) (Assistant head coach)
- 2018: Montreal Carabins (Assistant coach)
- 2018–2019: Collège André-Grasset (Offensive coordinator) (Assistant head coach)
- 2020–present: Montreal Carabins (Head coach) (Offensive coordinator)

Awards and highlights
- 3× Vanier Cup champion (2010, 2014, 2023)

Marco Iadeluca (born June 29, 1972) is the current head coach and offensive coordinator for the Université de Montréal's football team, the Montreal Carabins. He is a three-time Vanier Cup champion, once as a head coach and twice as an offensive coordinator.

== University ==
Iadeluca attended the University of Quebec in Montreal where he obtained a Bachelor's degree in Business Administration.

== Junior career ==
Iadeluca played at quarterback for the St-Léonard Cougars, formerly of the Canadian Junior Football League, from 1990 to 1994.

== Coaching career ==
=== Early career ===
Iadeluca first began his coaching career as the offensive coordinator for the St-Léonard Cougars of Midget AAA from 1994 to 1997. He then moved to junior football and coached the St-Léonard Cougars of the Canadian Junior Football League as the team's offensive coordinator from 1998 to 2008. He next became the assistant head coach and offensive coordinator for Collège André-Grasset Phenix where he spent one year, in 2009.

=== Laval Rouge et Or ===
In 2010, Iadeluca made the move to CIS football where he became the offensive coordinator for the Laval Rouge et Or. That year, the Rouge et Or finished with an undefeated season as they ended the year with a 46th Vanier Cup championship over the Calgary Dinos in Quebec City. However, he submitted his resignation following the season, citing a need to be closer to his family, who remained in Montreal.

=== Montreal Carabins ===
On December 16, 2010, Iadeluca was hired by Danny Maciocia to serve as the offensive coordinator for the Montreal Carabins In his fourth season, in 2014, the Carabins won their first Dunsmore Cup championship in a game against his former team, the Rouge et Or. The Carabins then advanced to the 50th Vanier Cup where they defeated the McMaster Marauders in the first ever Vanier Cup held in Montreal and Iadeluca won his second championship.

The team continued to see success at a national level as they advanced to the Vanier Cup the following year, but were defeated by the UBC Thunderbirds in the 51st Vanier Cup. However, the team endured two straight Dunsmore Cup losses to the Rouge et Or thereafter. On July 18, 2018, it was announced that Iadeluca would be relinquishing duties as offensive coordinator to Gabriel Cousineau after Iadeluca accepted a job in sports management at Collège André-Grasset.

=== Collège André-Grasset (II) ===
While completing his last year with the Carabins in 2018, Iadeluca was the offensive coordinator and assistant head coach for the Collège André-Grasset Phenix. The team also won the Bol D'Or championship that year. He served in the same role in 2019, in addition to his duties as sports manager.

=== Montreal Carabins (II) ===
After Danny Maciocia's departure, Iadeluca was named head coach of the Montreal Carabins on February 11, 2020. However, the team did not play in 2020 due to the cancellation of the 2020 season. In his first season, in 2021, he led the team to a 7–1 record with a first-place finish and a Dunsmore Cup victory over the Laval Rouge et Or. However, the team lost a close Uteck Bowl game to the Saskatchewan Huskies by a score of 14–10. In 2022, the team finished in second place and lost the conference championship to the Rouge et Or on a last play missed field goal single point.

In the 2023 season, Iadeluca led the team to another first-place finished with a 7–1 record and the program's fifth Dunsmore Cup championship. His team capped off the season with a win in the 58th Vanier Cup over the UBC Thunderbirds and he won his first national championship as a head coach.

== Personal life ==
Iadeluca and his wife, Lina, have three daughters.

== Head coaching record ==
| Year | Overall | Conference | Standing | Bowl/playoffs |
|---|---|---|---|---|
Montreal Carabins (RSEQ) (2020–present)
| 2020 | Season canceled due to COVID-19 pandemic | | | |
| 2021 | 9-2 | 7-1 | 1st | W Dunsmore, L Uteck |
| 2022 | 7-3 | 6-2 | 2nd | L Dunsmore |
| 2023 | 11-1 | 7-1 | 1st | W Dunsmore, W Uteck, W Vanier |
| 2024 | 8-2 | 7-1 | 2nd | L Dunsmore |
| 2025 | 10-2 | 6-2 | 2nd | W Dussault, W Uteck, W Vanier |
| Montreal: | 45-10 | 33-7 | | |
| Total: | 45-10 | | | |
