= 61st Vanier Cup =

2026 Canadian university football championship

Western	Montreal
(6–2)	(6–2)
Head coach: Michael Faulds	Head coach: Marco Iadeluca
- Date: November 28, 2026
- Stadium: Telus Université Laval Stadium
- Location: Quebec City, Quebec

Broadcasters
- Network: English: CBC, French: TVA Sports

The 2026 Vanier Cup, the 61st edition of the Canadian university football championship, is scheduled for November 28, 2026, at Telus Université Laval Stadium in Quebec City, Quebec. The RSEQ champion Montreal Carabins will play the OUA champion Western Mustangs in the title game.

== Host ==
This is scheduled to be the eighth time that Quebec City will host the Vanier Cup and the first since 2021.

== Date ==
While no date was specified in the press release announcement, if previous scheduling formulas are in effect, this game would take place on November 28, 2026. The date was confirmed in the U Sports calendar schedule.

== Background ==
=== Semi-final games ===
The Vanier Cup is played between the champions of the Mitchell Bowl and the Uteck Bowl, the national semi-final games. In 2026, according to the rotating schedule, the Yates Cup Ontario champion Western Mustangs defeated the Atlantic conference's Loney Bowl champion Saint Mary's Huskies 64–14 in the Mitchell Bowl. The Québec conference champion Montreal Carabins defeated the Canada West Hardy Trophy champion UBC Thunderbirds 30–13 in the Uteck Bowl.

==== Bracket ====
November 21st Semi-finals
24th Mitchell Bowl – London, ON
Saint Mary's	14
Western	64
23rd Uteck Bowl – Montreal, QC
British Columbia	13
Montreal	30

November 28th Final
61st Vanier Cup – Quebec City, QC
Western
Montreal
