= 2022 U Sports football season =

- Duration: August 27, 2022 – October 29, 2022
- Hardy Cup champions: Saskatchewan
- Yates Cup champions: Western
- Dunsmore Cup champions: Laval
- Loney Bowl champions: St. Francis
- Mitchell Bowl champions: Laval
- Uteck Bowl champions: Saskatchewan

Vanier Cup
- Date: November 26, 2022
- Venue: Western Alumni Stadium; London, Ontario
- Champions: Laval

U Sports football seasons
- 2021 2023

The 2022 U Sports football season began on August 27, 2022, with four Atlantic University Sport teams, four RSEQ teams, and ten Ontario University Athletics teams opening their schedules that day. The six Canada West teams began their schedules one week later with two games on September 2 and one on September 3.

The conference championships were played on the weekend of November 12, 2022, and the season concluded on November 26, 2022, with the 57th Vanier Cup championship, which returned to the pre-pandemic scheduling used in 2019. The championship game was played at Western Alumni Stadium in London, Ontario for the first time in the game's history. 27 university teams in Canada played U Sports football, the highest level of amateur Canadian football.

== Schedule changes ==
On April 7, 2022, the OUA released their schedule which featured a return to an eight-game format and no divisions or geographical restrictions. With the season starting in August and ending in October, this was more in line with the pre-pandemic 2019 U Sports football season as opposed to the truncated 2021 season. The 114th Yates Cup game was played on November 12, 2022.

The AUS released their schedule on April 13, 2022, as the conference also returned to pre-pandemic scheduling with eight games played by each team and two bye weeks. The Loney Bowl was played on November 12, 2022. Canada West also returned to eight regular season games and the Hardy Cup was played on the weekend of November 12, 2022. The RSEQ announced their schedule last which featured eight games over ten weeks and a Dunsmore Cup championship date of November 12, 2022.

== Regular season ==
=== Standings ===
2022 AUS standings
Team	W		L	PF		PA	Pts	Ply
#6 St. FX	8	–	0	261	–	83	16	†
Bishop's	4	–	3	137	–	105	10	X
#10 Mount Allison	4	–	4	98	–	144	8	X
Saint Mary's	3	–	4	116	–	159	6	
Acadia	0	–	8	88	–	209	0	
*The Sept 24 Bishop's at Saint Mary's game was cancelled and the Oct 29 Saint Mary's at Bishop's game is worth four points. † – Conference Champion; Rankings: U Sports Top 10

2022 OUA standings
Team	W		L	PF		PA	Pts	Ply
#1 Western	8	–	0	360	–	115	16	†
#3 Queen's	7	–	1	300	–	127	14	X
#7 Ottawa	6	–	2	243	–	129	12	X
#8 Laurier	5	–	3	235	–	164	10	X
Carleton	5	–	3	201	–	195	10	X
Windsor	4	–	4	189	–	194	8	X
Toronto	4	–	4	185	–	219	8	X
McMaster	2	–	6	140	–	118	4	
Guelph	1	–	7	158	–	319	2	
Waterloo	1	–	7	154	–	308	2	
York	1	–	7	43	–	317	2	
*McMaster forfeited one win vs York due to use of an ineligible player † – Conference Champion; Rankings: U Sports Top 10

2022 RSEQ standings
Team	W		L	PF		PA	Pts	Ply
#2 Laval	7	–	1	274	–	112	14	†
#5 Montréal	6	–	2	163	–	124	12	X
Sherbrooke	4	–	4	164	–	193	8	X
Concordia	2	–	6	185	–	262	4	X
McGill	1	–	7	167	–	262	2	
† – Conference Champion; Rankings: U Sports Top 10

2022 Canada West standings
Team	W		L	PF		PA	Pts	Ply
#4 Saskatchewan	7	–	1	241	–	119	14	†
Regina	5	–	3	195	–	159	10	X
Manitoba	4	–	4	232	–	217	8	X
#9 British Columbia	4	–	4	182	–	186	8	X
Alberta	3	–	5	175	–	201	6	
Calgary	1	–	7	117	–	260	2	
† – Conference Champion; Rankings: U Sports Top 10

== Post-season awards ==
=== Award-winners ===
	Quebec	Ontario	Atlantic	Canada West	National
Hec Crighton Trophy	Kevin Mital (Laval)	Keon Edwards (Western)	Malcolm Bussey (St. Francis Xavier)	Mason Nyhus (Saskatchewan)	Kevin Mital (Laval)
Presidents' Trophy	Nicky Farinaccio (Montreal)	Daniel Valente Jr. (Western)	Gabriel Royer (Bishop's)	Ryder Varga (Regina)	Nicky Farinaccio (Montreal)
J. P. Metras Trophy	Nathaniel Dumoulin Duguay (Laval)	Silas Hubert (Queen's)	Alex Fedchun (St. Francis Xavier)	Theo Benedet (UBC)	Theo Benedet (UBC)
Peter Gorman Trophy	Eloa Latendresse-Regimbald (McGill)	Isaiah Smith (Guelph)	Zachary Houde (St. Francis Xavier)	Jack Warrack (Saskatchewan)	Eloa Latendresse-Regimbald (McGill)
Russ Jackson Award	N/A	Alex Cheng (McMaster)	Duncan Patterson (Saint Mary's)	Ryker Frank (Saskatchewan)	Duncan Patterson (Saint Mary's)
Frank Tindall Trophy	Glen Constantin (Laval)	Greg Marshall (Western)	Gary Waterman (St. Francis Xavier)	Mark McConkey (Regina)	Gary Waterman (St. Francis Xavier)
Gino Fracas Award	Luc Sylvain (Sherbrooke)	Mike Circelli (Windsor)	Tyler Wilson (St. Francis Xavier)	Vaughan Mitchell (Manitoba)	Mike Circelli (Windsor)

=== All-Canadian Team ===
Offence
	First Team	Second Team
Quarterback	Arnaud Desjardins (Laval)	Mason Nyhus (Saskatchewan)
Running Back	Keon Edwards (Western); Malcolm Bussey (St. Francis Xavier)	Isaiah Knight (UBC); J-P Cimankinda (Ottawa)
Receiver	Kevin Mital (Laval); Jeremy Murphy (Concordia); Savaughn Magnaye-Jones (Western); Daniel Perry (Saskatchewan)	A. K. Gassama (Manitoba); Darius Simmons (McGill); Richard Burton (Queen's); Ethan Jordan (Laurier)
Centre	Elliot Beamer (Western)	Daniel Shin (Alberta)
Guard	Nicolas Guay (Laval); Phillip Grohovac (Western)	Evan Floren (Queen's); Giovanni Manu (UBC)
Tackle	Theo Benedet (UBC); Nathaniel Dumoulin Duguay (Laval)	Zack Fry (Western); Anthony Vandal (Sherbrooke)

Defence
	First Team	Second Team
Defensive Tackle	Tanner Schmekel (Regina); Jean-William Rouleau (Laval)	Darien Newell (Queen's); Kyle Samson (UBC)
Defensive End	Anthony Bennett (Regina); Silas Hubert (Queen's)	Scott Murray (Guelph); Philippe Lemieux-Cardinal (Montréal)
Linebacker	Nicky Farinaccio (Montréal); Ryder Varga (Regina); James Peter (Ottawa)	Emmanuel Aboagye-Gyan (Ottawa); Ryan Baker (UBC); Alec Poirier (Laval)
Free Safety	Daniel Valente (Western)	Jaxon Ford (Regina)
Defensive Halfback	Ashton Miller-Melancon (Queen's); Cristophe Beaulieu (Laval)	Charlie Ringland (Saskatchewan); Robert Panabaker (Western)
Cornerback	Benjamin Labrosse (McGill); Siriman-Harrison Bagayogo (Guelph)	Kevin Victome (Ottawa); Kaylyn St-Cyr (Montréal)

Special Teams
	First Team	Second Team
Kicker	Tyler Mullan (Queen's)	David Solie (Saskatchewan)
Punter	Chris MacLean (Calgary)	Dawson Hodge (Wilfrid Laurier)
Returner	Alfred Olay (York)	Santino Sparagna (Concordia)

== Post-season ==
The Vanier Cup was played between the champions of the Mitchell Bowl and the Uteck Bowl, the national semi-final games. In 2022, according to the rotating schedule, the Québec conference Dunsmore Cup championship team visited the Yates Cup Ontario championship team for the Mitchell Bowl. The winners of the Canada West Hardy Trophy visited the Atlantic conference's Loney Bowl championship team for the Uteck Bowl. These games were played on November 19, 2022, while the 57th Vanier Cup was played on November 26, 2022.

=== Atlantic University Sport ===
November 5 Semi-finals			November 12; 31st Loney Bowl
			1	St. Francis Xavier	21
2	Bishop's	12	3	Mount Allison	14
3	Mount Allison	15

=== Réseau du sport étudiant du Québec ===
November 5 Demi-finales
1	Laval	38
4	Concordia	27
2	Montreal	23
3	Sherbrooke	15

November 12; 41re Coupe Dunsmore
1	Laval	25
2	Montreal	24

=== Ontario University Athletics ===
October 29; Quarter-finals
4	Wilfrid Laurier	41
5	Carleton	13
2	Queen's	41
7	Toronto	13
3	Ottawa	43
6	Windsor	40

November 5 Semi-finals
1	Western	45
4	Wilfrid Laurier	9
2	Queen's	35
3	Ottawa	13

November 12; 114th Yates Cup
1	Western	44
2	Queen's	14

=== Canada West Universities Athletic Association ===
November 5 Semi-finals
1	Saskatchewan	37
4	Manitoba	9
2	Regina	14
3	UBC	28

November 12; 85th Hardy Trophy
1	Saskatchewan	23
3	UBC	8

=== U Sports finals ===
November 19; Semi-finals; 19th Uteck Bowl; 20th Mitchell Bowl
St. Francis Xavier	19
Saskatchewan	36
Western	20
Laval	27

November 26; 57th Vanier Cup
Saskatchewan	24
Laval	30

=== National Semifinals ===
Uteck Bowl

Quarter	1	2	3	4	Total
Saskatchewan	3	3	7	23	36
St. Francis Xavier	0	6	7	6	19

at Oland Stadium, Antigonish, Nova Scotia

- Date: November 19
- Game time: 1:00pm EST
- Game weather: Clear, 3 °C (37 °F)
- Game attendance: 2,173
- Referee: Greg Maclean
- TV: CBC Sports
- Boxscore
Mitchell Bowl

Quarter	1	2	3	4	Total
Laval	0	4	14	9	27
Western	17	0	0	3	20

at Western Alumni Stadium, London, Ontario

- Date: November 19
- Game time: 4:00pm EST
- Game weather: Cloudy, −3 °C (27 °F)
- Referee: K.Baird
- TV: CBC Sports
- Boxscore

== See also ==
- 2022 NCAA Division I FBS football season
- 2022 NCAA Division I FCS football season
- 2022 NCAA Division II football season
- 2022 NCAA Division III football season
- 2022 NAIA football season
- 2022 junior college football season
