= 58th Vanier Cup =

2023 Canadian university football championship

UBC Thunderbirds	Montreal Carabins
(6–2)	(7–1)
9	16
Head coach: Blake Nill	Head coach: Marco Iadeluca
	1	2	3	4	Total
UBC Thunderbirds	0	6	0	3	9
Montreal Carabins	9	0	7	0	16
- Date: November 25, 2023
- Stadium: Richardson Memorial Stadium
- Location: Kingston, Ontario
- Ted Morris Memorial Trophy: Jonathan Sénécal
- Bruce Coulter Award: Nicky Farinaccio
- National anthem: All the Queen's Men
- Referee: Brent Young
- Attendance: 7109

Broadcasters
- Network: English: CBC Sports; French: TVA Sports
- Announcers: Mark Lee (play-by-play); Dashawn Stephens (analyst); Signa Butler (sideline reporter)

The 2023 Vanier Cup, the 58th edition of the U Sports Football Championship, took place on November 25, 2023 at Richardson Memorial Stadium in Kingston, Ontario. The game determined the U Sports football national champion for the 2023 season.

The Montreal Carabins defeated the UBC Thunderbirds by a score of 16–9 to win the second Vanier Cup championship in program history.

== Host ==
This was the first time that Kingston hosted the Vanier Cup since its inception in 1965. However, it was the third time that the school had hosted the university final, with the others taking place in 1920 and 1929.

== Background ==
=== Semi-final games ===
It was announced that according to the rotating schedule, the Québec conference Dunsmore Cup championship team would host the Yates Cup Ontario championship team for the Uteck Bowl. The winners of the Canada West Hardy Trophy would host the Atlantic conference's Loney Bowl championship team for the Mitchell Bowl. These games were scheduled to be played on November 18, 2023.

In the first semifinal, UBC defeated St. Francis Xavier 47–17. In the second semifinals, Montreal defeated Western 29–3. This was UBC's first finals since 2015, and Montreal's first since 2019, when they lost against Calgary.

==== Bracket ====
November 18th Semi-finals
Uteck Bowl – Montreal, QC
Montreal	29
Western	3
Mitchell Bowl – Vancouver, BC
UBC	47
St. Francis Xavier	17

November 25th Final
Vanier Cup – Kingston, ON
Montreal	16
UBC	9

== Teams ==
The championship game matched UBC from the Canada West Conference and Montreal from the RSEQ Conference. The programs previously met for the 51st Vanier Cup, when UBC captured their fourth national championship.

== Statistics ==
Team statistical comparison
Statistics	Montreal	UBC
First downs	17	18
First downs rushing	10	6
First downs passing	7	12
First downs penalty	0	0
Third down efficiency	2–2	4–8
Fourth down efficiency	0–0	0–0
Rushing attempts–net yards	20–163	21–84
Yards per rush	8.2	4.0
Yards passing	170	279
Pass completions–attempts	16–26	26–40
Interceptions thrown	1	0
Punt returns–total yards	9–348	4–111
Kickoff returns–total yards	3–155	1–50
Possession time	27:43	32:17

Montreal statistics
Carabins passing
Name	C–A	Yds	TD–INT
Jonathan Senecal	16–17	170	0–1
Carabins rushing
Name	Car	Yds	TD
Jonathan Senecal	6	53	1
Globi Halafu	5	47	0
Iraghi Muganda	2	24	1
Lucas Bertet-Dembele	3	18	0
Carl Chabot	3	18	0
Redval Keita	1	3	0
Carabins receiving
Name	Rec	Yds	TD
Iraghi Muganda	4	68	0
Carl Chabot	4	41	0
William Legault	2	29	0
Brandon Gourdon	2	16	0
Lucas Bertet-Dembele	2	7	0
D. Alexandre	1	6	0
Simon Riopel	1	3	0

UBC statistics
Thunderbirds passing
Name	C–A	Yds	TD–INT
Garrett Rooker	26–40	279	0–0
Thunderbirds rushing
Name	Car	Yds	TD
Isaiah Knight	15	74	0
Dane Kapler	5	14	0
Iraghi Muganda	1	2	1
Thunderbirds receiving
Name	Rec	Yds	TD
Sam Davenport	5	66	0
Dane Kapler	5	64	0
Lucas Robertson	5	34	0
Jason Soriano	1	30	0
Ryan Baker	1	25	0
Isaiah Knight	2	23	0
Cesare Rednour-Bruc	2	18	0
Shemar McBean	3	7	0
Eric Williams-Her	1	6	0
Gavin Owen	1	6	0
