= 2019 U Sports football season =

- Duration: August 23, 2019 – October 26, 2019
- Hardy Cup champions: Calgary Dinos
- Yates Cup champions: McMaster Marauders
- Dunsmore Cup champions: Montreal Carabins
- Loney Bowl champions: Acadia Axemen
- Mitchell Bowl champions: Calgary Dinos
- Uteck Bowl champions: Montreal Carabins

Vanier Cup
- Date: November 23, 2019
- Venue: Quebec City, Quebec
- Champions: Calgary Dinos

U Sports football seasons seasons
- 2018 2020

The 2019 U Sports football season began on August 23, 2019, with the Concordia Stingers hosting the Montreal Carabins in Montreal, Quebec. The Atlantic University Sport conference started play the following day and the Ontario University Athletics conference began play on August 25, 2019. The Canada West teams began play during the following weekend, on August 30, 2019. All 27 U Sports football teams played eight regular season games against opponents within the same conference.

The conference championships were played on November 9 and the season ended on November 23 with the 55th Vanier Cup championship at PEPS Stadium in Quebec City, Quebec. The Calgary Dinos defeated the Montreal Carabins 27–13 to win their fifth Vanier Cup, and their first since 1995.

== Regular season ==
=== Standings ===
2019 AUS standings
Team	W		L	PF		PA	Pts	Ply
#4 Acadia	8	–	0	309	–	165	16	†
Bishop's	4	–	4	150	–	210	8	X
Mount Allison	3	–	5	194	–	161	6	X
Saint Mary's	3	–	5	159	–	190	6	
St. FX	2	–	6	128	–	214	4	
† – Conference Champion; Rankings: U Sports Top 10

2019 OUA standings
Team	W		L	PF		PA	Pts	Ply
#1 Western	8	–	0	290	–	175	16	X
#3 McMaster	6	–	2	228	–	151	12	†
#8 Guelph	6	–	2	242	–	142	12	X
Ottawa	5	–	3	252	–	197	10	X
Waterloo	4	–	4	288	–	283	8	X
Carleton	4	–	4	181	–	214	8	X
#9 Laurier	4	–	4	260	–	203	8	
Queen's	3	–	5	177	–	224	6	
Toronto	2	–	6	222	–	249	4	
Windsor	1	–	7	190	–	342	2	
York	1	–	7	122	–	272	2	
† – Conference Champion; Rankings: U Sports Top 10

2019 RSEQ standings
Team	W		L	PF		PA	Pts	Ply
#2 Laval	7	–	1	301	–	72	14	X
#5 Montréal	6	–	2	144	–	93	12	†
McGill	3	–	5	124	–	191	6	X
Concordia	2	–	6	121	–	262	4	X
Sherbrooke	2	–	6	135	–	207	4	
† – Conference Champion; Rankings: U Sports Top 10

2019 Canada West standings
Team	W		L	PF		PA	Pts	Ply
#7 Calgary	6	–	2	246	–	166	12	†
#6 Saskatchewan	5	–	3	257	–	161	10	X
Alberta	4	–	4	179	–	208	8	X
Manitoba	4	–	4	221	–	242	8	X
#10 Regina	3	–	5	211	–	189	6	
British Columbia	2	–	6	163	–	311	4	
† – Conference Champion; Rankings: U Sports Top 10

== Post-season awards ==
=== Award-winners ===
	Quebec	Ontario	Atlantic	Canada West	NATIONAL
Hec Crighton Trophy	Adam Vance (Concordia)	Chris Merchant (Western)	Hunter Guenard (Acadia)	Adam Machart (Saskatchewan)	Chris Merchant (Western)
Presidents' Trophy	Andrew Seinet-Spaulding (McGill)	Jack Cassar (Carleton)	Bailey Feltmate (Acadia)	Nelson Lokombo (Saskatchewan)	Nelson Lokombo (Saskatchewan)
J. P. Metras Trophy	Andrew Seinet-Spaulding (McGill)	Cameron Lawson (Queen's)	Oliver Grant (Acadia)	Evan Machibroda (Saskatchewan)	Andrew Seinet-Spaulding (McGill)
Peter Gorman Trophy	Jeremy Murphy (Concordia)	Kojo Odoom (Western)	Daniel Bell (Mount Allison)	Ramsey Derbas (Saskatchewan)	Jeremy Murphy (Concordia)
Russ Jackson Award	Alexandre Pare (McGill)	Jacob Janke (York)	Bailey Feltmate (Acadia)	Derek Dufault (Manitoba)	Jacob Janke (York)
Frank Tindall Trophy	Glen Constantin (Laval)	Greg Marshall (Western)	Jeff Cummins (Acadia)	Scott Flory (Saskatchewan)	Greg Marshall (Western)

=== All-Canadian Team ===
Offence
	First Team	Second Team
Quarterback	Chris Merchant (Western)	Tre Ford (Waterloo)
Running Back	Adam Machart (Saskatchewan); Levondre Gordon (Laurier)	Felix Garand-Gauthier (Laval); Dale Wright (Acadia)
Inside Receiver	Tyler Ternowski (Waterloo); James Tyrrell (Concordia)	Brett Ellerman (Western); Will Corby (Toronto)
Outside Receiver	Jalen Philpot (Calgary); Glodin Mulall (Acadia)	Kevin Kaya (Montreal); Ben Kopczynski (Alberta)
Centre	Connor Berglof (Saskatchewan)	Samuel Lefebvre (Laval)
Guard	Samuel Thomassin (Laval); Mattland Riley (Saskatchewan)	Coulter Woodmansey (Guelph); Pier-Olivier Lestage (Montreal)
Tackle	Ketel Asse (Laval); Carter O'Donnell (Alberta)	Logan Bandy (Calgary); Zack Fry (Western)

Defence
	First Team	Second Team
Defensive Tackle	Andrew Seinet-Spaulding (McGill); Evan Machibroda (Saskatchewan)	Cameron Lawson (Queen's); J-Min Pelley (Calgary)
Defensive End	Derek Dufault (Manitoba); Reshaan Davis (Ottawa)	Samuel Rossi (Montreal); Malcolm Campbell (Toronto)
Linebacker	Jack Cassar (Carleton); Alexander Campbell (Laval); Nick Cross (UBC)	Brian Harelimana (Montreal); Ben Hladik (UBC); Bailey Feltmate (Acadia)
Free Safety	Jayden Dalke (Alberta)	Jacob Janke (York)
Defensive Halfback	Nelson Lokombo (Saskatchewan); Marc-Antoine Dequoy (Montreal)	Noah Hallett (McMaster); Shae Weekes (Manitoba)
Cornerback	Bleska Kambamba (Western); Deane Leonard (Calgary)	Tyrell Ford (Waterloo); Antoine Lyte-Myers (Saint Mary's)

Special Teams
	First Team	Second Team
Kicker	Marc Liegghio (Western)	Louis Tardif (Sherbrooke)
Punter	Marc Liegghio (Western)	Kieran Burnham (St. Francis Xavier)
Returner	Clark Barnes (Guelph)	Michael Ritchott (Manitoba)

== Post-season ==
The Vanier Cup is played between the champions of the Mitchell Bowl and the Uteck Bowl, the national semi-final games. In 2019, according to the rotating schedule, the Canada West Hardy Trophy championship team hosted the Yates Cup Ontario championship team for the Mitchell Bowl. The winners of the Atlantic conference's Loney Bowl hosted the Quebec conference Dunsmore Cup championship team for the Uteck Bowl.

=== Conference Playoffs ===
==== Atlantic University Sport ====
November 2 Semi-final			November 9 Loney Bowl
			1	Acadia	31
2	Bishop's	28	2	Bishop's	1
3	Mount Allison	18

==== Réseau du sport étudiant du Québec ====
November 2 Semi-finals
1	Laval	40
4	Concordia	8
2	Montreal	31
3	McGill	0

November 9 Dunsmore Cup
1	Laval	10
2	Montreal	25

==== Ontario University Athletics ====
October 26; Quarter-finals
4	Ottawa	21
5	Waterloo	44
3	Guelph	22
6	Carleton	17

November 2 Semi-finals
1	Western	30
5	Waterloo	24
2	McMaster	19
3	Guelph	9

November 9; 112th Yates Cup
1	Western	15
2	McMaster	29

==== Canada West Universities Athletic Association ====
November 2 Semi-finals
1	Calgary	47
4	Manitoba	46
2	Saskatchewan	28
3	Alberta	23

November 9; 83rd Hardy Trophy
1	Calgary	29
2	Saskatchewan	4

=== National Semifinals ===
Uteck Bowl

Quarter	1	2	3	4	Total
Montreal	1	6	24	7	38
Acadia	0	0	0	0	0

at Raymond Field (Wolfville, Nova Scotia)

- Date: November 16
- Game time: 2:00pm AST
- Game attendance: 1,816
- Referee: Greg MacLean
- TV: TVA Sports
- Boxscore
Mitchell Bowl

Quarter	1	2	3	4	Total
McMaster	0	10	0	7	17
Calgary	7	10	3	10	30

at McMahon Stadium (Calgary)

- Date: November 16
- Game time: 1:00pm MST
- Game attendance: 1,727
- Referee: J.P. Chorney
- TV: TVA Sports
- Boxscore

=== National Championship ===
55th Vanier Cup

Quarter	1	2	3	4	Total
Calgary	0	13	0	14	27
Montreal	0	7	3	3	13

at PEPS Stadium (Quebec City)

- Date: November 23
- Game time: 1:00 p.m. EST
- Game attendance: 8,376
- TV announcers (CBC): Mark Lee (play-by-play), Justin Dunk (analyst), Andi Petrillo (sideline reporter)
- Boxscore
