= Charles-Elliot Bouliane =

Canadian gridiron football player (born 2002)

- Bouliane with the Winnipeg Blue Bombers in 2026

No. 52 – Winnipeg Blue Bombers
- Position: Linebacker
- Roster status: Active
- CFL status: National

Personal information
- Born: February 19, 2002 (age 24)
- Listed height: 5 ft 11 in (1.80 m)
- Listed weight: 228 lb (103 kg)

Career information
- High school: Collège André-Grasset (Montreal, Quebec)
- University: Montreal (2022–2025)
- CFL draft: 2026: 3rd round, 24th overall pick

Career history
- Winnipeg Blue Bombers (2026–present)

Awards and highlights
- 2× Vanier Cup champion (2023, 2025); First-team All-Canadian (2023); 2× First-team RSEQ All-Star (2023, 2025)
- Stats at CFL.ca

Charles-Elliot Bouliane (born February 19, 2002) is a Canadian professional football linebacker for the Winnipeg Blue Bombers of the Canadian Football League (CFL). He played U Sports football for the Montreal Carabins.

== U Sports career ==
Bouliane played U Sports football for the Montreal Carabins from 2022 to 2025. He played in 29 games, registering 78.5 tackles, including 9.5 for loss, 6.5 sacks, one pass breakup, one interception, one forced fumble and three fumble recoveries. In 2023, Bouliane won the Vanier Cup and was a first-team All-Canadian and RSEQ selection. In 2025, he was a RSEQ All-star whilst also winning the Vanier Cup for a second time.

== Professional career ==
Bouliane was selected with the 24th pick in the third round of the 2026 CFL draft by the Winnipeg Blue Bombers. He was officially signed on April 30, 2026. On May 31, he was signed to the practice roster. On June 10, Bouliane was activated and made his CFL debut against the Hamilton Tiger-Cats the following day. He made one tackle on special teams in a loss to Hamilton.
