= 2023 U Sports football season =

- League: U Sports
- Sport: Canadian football
- Duration: August 25, 2023 – October 28, 2023

Playoffs
- Hardy Cup champions: UBC Thunderbirds
- Yates Cup champions: Western Mustangs
- Dunsmore Cup champions: Montreal Carabins
- Loney Bowl champions: St. Francis Xavier X-Men
- Mitchell Bowl champions: UBC Thunderbirds
- Uteck Bowl champions: Montreal Carabins

Vanier Cup
- Date: November 25, 2023
- Venue: Richardson Memorial Stadium (Kingston, Ontario)
- Champions: Montreal Carabins

Seasons
- 2022 2024

The 2023 U Sports football season began on August 25, 2023, with the defending champion Laval Rouge et Or visiting the Sherbrooke Vert et Or. On the following day, ten Ontario University Athletics teams, four Atlantic University Sport teams, and two RSEQ opened their schedules on August 26, 2023. On the following weekend, the six Canada West teams opened their seasons on September 1, 2023.

The conference championships were played on the weekend of November 11, 2023, and the season concluded on November 25, 2023, with the 58th Vanier Cup championship. The Vanier Cup game was held at Richardson Memorial Stadium in Kingston, Ontario, for the first time in its history. 27 university teams in Canada played U Sports football, the highest level of amateur Canadian football.

On September 23, 2023, Manitoba Bisons kicker Maya Turner became the first woman to play in a U Sports regular season football game. She kicked the game winning field goal in overtime for the Bisons in their game against the Regina Rams.

== Schedules ==
On January 19, 2023, the OUA released their schedule which featured no major changes from the 2022 season, with 11 teams playing eight regular season games over nine weeks. The regular season will start on August 26, 2023, and end on October 21, 2023. Seven teams will qualify for the playoffs, which begin on October 28, 2023, with the top seed having a first-round bye. The 115th Yates Cup game is scheduled to be played on November 11, 2023.

On April 20, 2023, the AUS schedule was revealed with the first two games scheduled to be played on August 26, 2023. Five AUS teams will play eight games over 10 weeks with each team receiving two bye weeks. In a format change this year, the top four teams will qualify for the AUS playoffs rather than three, with two semi-final games determining the participants for the AUS championship. The Canada West schedule was announced on April 25, 2023, and the RSEQ schedule was revealed on April 27, 2023, with no major scheduling changes from the 2022 U Sports football season.

== Regular season ==
=== Standings ===
2023 AUS standings
Team	W		L	PF		PA	Pts	Ply
#5 St. FX	8	–	0	267	–	90	16	†
Bishop's	6	–	2	238	–	110	12	X
Mount Allison	3	–	5	100	–	176	6	X
Saint Mary's	2	–	6	115	–	252	4	X
Acadia	1	–	7	81	–	203	2	
† – Conference Champion; Rankings: U Sports Top 10

2023 OUA standings
Team	W		L	PF		PA	Pts	Ply
#1 Western	8	–	0	350	–	151	16	†
#3 Laurier	7	–	1	282	–	145	14	X
#9 Windsor	6	–	2	256	–	132	12	X
#7 Queen's	5	–	3	242	–	122	10	X
Ottawa	4	–	4	171	–	187	8	X
Carleton	4	–	4	226	–	168	8	X
Waterloo	3	–	5	188	–	251	6	X
Guelph	3	–	5	248	–	214	6	
Toronto	2	–	6	171	–	250	4	
McMaster	2	–	6	191	–	187	4	
York	0	–	8	42	–	560	0	
† – Conference Champion; Rankings: U Sports Top 10

2023 RSEQ standings
Team	W		L	PF		PA	Pts	Ply
#2 Montréal	7	–	1	288	–	93	14	†
#4 Laval	6	–	2	226	–	122	12	X
Concordia	5	–	3	200	–	192	8	X
Sherbrooke	1	–	7	136	–	280	2	X
McGill	1	–	7	147	–	310	2	
† – Conference Champion; Rankings: U Sports Top 10

2023 Canada West standings
Team	W		L	PF		PA	Pts	Ply
#10 British Columbia	6	–	2	271	–	156	12	†
#6 Alberta	6	–	2	247	–	196	12	X
#8 Saskatchewan	5	–	3	229	–	149	10	X
Manitoba	3	–	5	203	–	272	6	X
Calgary	3	–	5	140	–	204	6	
Regina	1	–	7	155	–	268	2	
† – Conference Champion; Rankings: U Sports Top 10

== Post-season awards ==
=== Award-winners ===
	Quebec	Ontario	Atlantic	Canada West	National
Hec Crighton Trophy	Jonathan Sénécal (Montreal)	Taylor Elgersma (Wilfrid Laurier)	Silas Fagnan (St. Francis Xavier)	Matthew Peterson (Alberta)	Jonathan Sénécal (Montreal)
Presidents' Trophy	Harold Miessan (Montreal)	Max Charbonneau (Ottawa)	Daniel Bell (Mount Allison)	Nick Wiebe (Saskatchewan)	Harold Miessan (Montreal)
J. P. Metras Trophy	Christopher Fontenard (Montreal)	Tyson Hergott (Waterloo)	Alex Fedchun (St. Francis Xavier)	Theo Benedet (British Columbia)	Theo Benedet (British Columbia)
Peter Gorman Trophy	Justin Cloutier (Laval)	Ethan Gregorcic (Wilfrid Laurier)	Mikaël Pattin (Bishop's)	Owen Sieben (Regina)	Justin Cloutier (Laval)
Russ Jackson Award	N/A	Alex Cheng (McMaster Marauders)	Spencer Richard (Acadia)	Mark Rauhaus (Manitoba)	Mark Rauhaus (Manitoba)
Frank Tindall Trophy	Marco Iadeluca (Montreal)	Michael Faulds (Wilfrid Laurier)	Gary Waterman (St. Francis Xavier)	Chris Morris (Alberta)	Chris Morris (Alberta)
Gino Fracas Award	Émilie Pfeiffer Badoux (Concordia)	Zach Scotto (Wilfrid Laurier)	Matt Elliott (Saint Mary's)	Vaughan Mitchell (Manitoba)	Vaughan Mitchell (Manitoba)

=== All-Canadian Team ===
Offence
	First Team	Second Team
Quarterback	Jonathan Sénécal (Montreal)	Taylor Elgersma (Laurier)
Running Back	Matthew Peterson (Alberta); Jared Chisari (Queen's)	Malcolm Bussey (St. Francis Xavier); Amlicar Polk (Ottawa)
Receiver	Ethan Jordan (Laurier); Darius Simmons (McGill); Savaughn Magnaye-Jones (Western); A. K. Gassama (Manitoba)	Raidan Thorne (Laurier); Kaseem Ferdinand (Carleton); Ben Harrington (St. Francis Xavier); Hassane Dosso (Montreal)
Centre	Daniel Shin (Alberta)	Ryan Berta (Queen's)
Guard	Giordano Vaccaro (Manitoba); Alassane Diouf (Montreal)	Matthew Ljuden (Alberta); Evan Floren (Queen's)
Tackle	Theo Benedet (UBC); Erik Andersen (Western)	Giovanni Manu (UBC); Nathaniel Dumoulin Duguay (Laval)
Utility	Lucas Robertson (UBC)	Niklas Henning (Queen's)

Defence
	First Team	Second Team
Defensive Tackle	Christopher Fontenard (Montreal); Darien Newell (Queen's)	Muftah Ageli (Windsor); Kyle Samson (UBC)
Defensive End	Jeremiah Ojo (Montreal); Tyson Hergott (Waterloo)	Kolade Amusan (Windsor); George Idoko (Saskatchewan)
Linebacker	Harold Miessan (Montreal); Nick Wiebe (Saskatchewan); Ife Onyemenam (Laurier)	Nicky Farinaccio (Montreal); Max Charbonneau (Ottawa); Lourenz Bowers-Kane (Western)
Free Safety	Jackson Findlay (Western)	Jonathan Giustini (Alberta)
Defensive Halfback	Bruno Lagacé (Montreal); Eric Cumberbatch (Ottawa)	Cristophe Beaulieu (Laval); Daniel Bell (Mount Allison)
Cornerback	Kaylyn St-Cyr (Montreal); Katley Joseph (Saskatchewan)	Jassin States-McClean (Saint Mary's); Louis Lavaud (Carleton)

Special Teams
	First Team	Second Team
Kicker	Ben Hadley (St. Francis Xavier)	Vincent Blanchard (Laval)
Punter	Aldo Galvan (Regina)	Michael Horvat (McMaster)
Returner	Javonni Cunningham (Windsor)	Guillaume Cauchon (Laval)
Rush/Cover	Charles-Elliot Bouliane (Montreal)	Skyler Griffith (UBC)

== Post-season ==
The Vanier Cup was played between the champions of the Mitchell Bowl and the Uteck Bowl, the national semi-final games. In 2023, as per the rotating schedule, the Atlantic conference's Loney Bowl championship team, the St. Francis Xavier X-Men, visited the Canada West Hardy Trophy winners, the UBC Thunderbirds for the Mitchell Bowl. The Yates Cup Ontario conference championship team, the Western Mustangs, visited the Québec conference Dunsmore Cup winners, the Montreal Carabins, for the Uteck Bowl. These games were played on November 18, 2023, while the Vanier Cup was played on November 25, 2023.

=== Conference championships ===
==== Atlantic University Sport ====
November 4 Semi-finals
1	St. Francis Xavier	36
4	St. Mary's	20
2	Bishop's	34
3	Mount Allison	15

November 11; 32nd Loney Bowl
1	St. Francis Xavier	34
2	Bishop's	23

==== Canada West ====
November 4 Semi-finals
1	UBC	29
4	Manitoba	21
2	Alberta	40
3	Saskatchewan	17

November 11; 86th Hardy Trophy
1	UBC	28
2	Alberta	27

==== Ontario University Athletics ====
October 28; Quarter-finals
4	Queen's	15
5	Ottawa	10
2	Laurier	69
7	Waterloo	0
3	Windsor	14
6	Carleton	11

November 4 Semi-finals
1	Western	47
4	Queen's	20
2	Laurier	21
3	Windsor	14

November 11; 115th Yates Cup
1	Western	29
2	Laurier	14

==== Réseau du sport étudiant du Québec ====
November 4 Demi-finales
1	Montréal	54
4	Sherbrooke	3
2	Laval	34
3	Concordia	27

November 11; 42e Coupe Dunsmore
1	Montréal	12
2	Laval	6

=== National championship ===
November 18th Semi-finals
Uteck Bowl – Montreal, QC
Montreal	29
Western	3
Mitchell Bowl – Vancouver, BC
UBC	47
St. Francis Xavier	17

November 25th Final
Vanier Cup – Kingston, ON
Montreal	16
UBC	9

== See also ==
- 2023 NCAA Division I FBS football season
- 2023 NCAA Division I FCS football season
- 2023 NCAA Division II football season
- 2023 NCAA Division III football season
- 2023 NAIA football season
- 2023 junior college football season
