= 50th Vanier Cup =

2014 Canadian university gridiron football championship

McMaster Marauders	Montreal Carabins
(10–1)	(10–1)
19	20
Head coach: Stefan Ptaszek	Head coach: Danny Maciocia
	1	2	3	4	Total
McMaster Marauders	6	7	6	0	19
Montreal Carabins	0	3	7	10	20
- Date: November 29, 2014
- Stadium: Molson Stadium
- Location: Montreal, QC
- Ted Morris Memorial Trophy: Regis Cibasu, Montréal
- Bruce Coulter Award: Anthony Coady, Montréal
- National anthem: Valérie Daure
- Coin toss: Michael Soles
- Referee: René Daigneault
- Halftime show: Les Trois Accords
- Attendance: 22,649

Broadcasters
- Network: TV: Sportsnet, Ici Radio-Canada Télé
- Ratings: ~320,000 on Sportsnet

The 2014 Vanier Cup, the 50th edition of the Canadian university football championship, took place on Saturday, November 29, 2014, at Molson Stadium in Montreal, Quebec. It was the first time that the city of Montreal hosted the Vanier Cup and it was organized by the Canadian Football League's Montreal Alouettes as opposed to a member CIS club. For the second consecutive year the championship game was played in the province of Quebec.

The game featured the OUA champion McMaster Marauders and the RSEQ champion Montreal Carabins. This was the first appearance for the Carabins and the fourth for the Marauders. The Carabins defeated the Marauders 20–19 on the strength of a blocked field goal with 51 seconds remaining in the game.

== Semi-Championships ==
The Vanier Cup is played between the champions of the Mitchell Bowl and the Uteck Bowl, the national semi-final games. In 2014, the Atlantic conference Loney Bowl champions visited the Ontario conference's Yates Cup champion for the Uteck Bowl. The winners of the Canada West conference Hardy Trophy visited the Dunsmore Cup Quebec championship team for the Mitchell Bowl.

== Scoring summary ==
First Quarter
MCM - Crapigna 22–yd field goal (3:58)
MCM - Crapigna 35–yd field goal (12:32)

Second Quarter
MON - Simoneau 9–yd field goal (3:25)
MCM - Moore touchdown 50–yd rush and converted (5:38)

Third Quarter
MON - Enchill touchdown off 9–yd pass and converted (2:15)
MCM - Crapigna 43–yd field goal (9:54)
MCM - Crapigna 29–yd field goal (14:07)

Fourth Quarter
MON - Thomas Erlington touchdown 3–yd run and converted (4:12)
MON - Simoneau 13–yd field goal (12:15)
MCM - Crapigna blocked field goal from 35 yd (14:01)

== Playoff bracket ==
Conference Quarter-finals
(6) Laurier Golden Hawks	10
(3) Western Ontario Mustangs	25
bye
(2) Guelph Gryphons
(5) Ottawa Gee-Gees	46
(4) Windsor Lancers	29
bye
(1) McMaster Marauders

Conference Semi-finals
(3) Acadia Axemen	17
(2) St. FX X-Men	18
bye
(1) Mount Allison Mounties
Western Ontario Mustangs	26
Guelph Gryphons	51
Ottawa Gee-Gees	31
McMaster Marauders	42
(4) Regina Rams	0
(1) Calgary Dinos	56
(3) Manitoba Bisons	47
(2) Saskatchewan Huskies	39
(3) Sherbrooke Vert et Or	13
(2) Montreal Carabins	40
(4) Concordia Stingers	18
(1) Laval Rouge et Or	74

Conference Championships
St. FX X-Men	7
Mount Allison Mounties	29
Guelph Gryphons	15
McMaster Marauders	20
Calgary Dinos	15
Manitoba Bisons	27
Montreal Carabins	12*
Laval Rouge et Or	9

National Semi-finals
Mount Allison Mounties	12
McMaster Marauders	24
Manitoba Bisons	26
Montreal Carabins	29

50th Vanier Cup
McMaster Marauders	19
Montreal Carabins	20

Number in parentheses represents seed in conference
