= 60th Vanier Cup =

2025 U Sports football national championship game

Montreal	Saskatchewan
(6–2)	(7–1)
30	16
Head coach: Marco Iadeluca	Head coach: Scott Flory
	1	2	3	4	Total
Montreal	4	11	8	7	30
Saskatchewan	3	8	3	2	16
- Date: November 22, 2025
- Stadium: Mosaic Stadium
- Location: Regina, Saskatchewan
- Ted Morris Memorial Trophy: Pepe Gonzalez Garza
- Bruce Coulter Award: Louis-Philippe Gauthier
- Referee: J.P. Chorney
- Attendance: 8,896

Broadcasters
- Network: English: CBC, French: TVA Sports
- Announcers: Mark Lee (play-by-play); Dashawn Stephens (analyst); Arash Madani (sideline reporter)

The 2025 Vanier Cup, the 60th edition of the Canadian university football championship, is scheduled for November 22, 2025, at Mosaic Stadium in Regina, Saskatchewan. The Canada West champion Saskatchewan Huskies played the RSEQ champion Montreal Carabins in the title game. The Carabins defeated the Huskies in the Vanier Cup, winning the contest, 30–16.

== Host ==
This was the first time that Regina hosted the Vanier Cup, and only the third time that it was held in Western Canada.

== Date ==
No date was specified in the press release announcement, but previous scheduling formulas indicated that this game would take place on November 22, 2025. This date was later confirmed following the 59th Vanier Cup game's conclusion.

== Background ==
=== Semi-final games ===
The Vanier Cup is played between the champions of the Mitchell Bowl and the Uteck Bowl, the national semi-final games. In 2025, the Canada West Hardy Trophy champion Saskatchewan Huskies defeated the Yates Cup Ontario champion Queen's Gaels 22–11 for the Mitchell Bowl. The Québec conference champion Montreal Carabins defeated the Atlantic conference's Loney Bowl champion Saint Mary's Huskies 49–19 in the Uteck Bowl.

==== Bracket ====
November 15th Semi-finals
23rd Mitchell Bowl – Saskatoon, SK
Queen's	11
Saskatchewan	22
22nd Uteck Bowl – Halifax, NS
Montreal	49
Saint Mary's	19

November 22nd Final
60th Vanier Cup – Regina, SK
Saskatchewan	16
Montreal	30

=== Teams ===
The championship game featured the Saskatchewan Huskies from Canada West and the Montreal Carabins from the RSEQ Conference. The Huskies were making their 12 Vanier Cup appearance and were seeking their fourth national championship and first since 1998. The Carabins were making their fifth Vanier Cup appearance and sought their fifth Vanier Cup victory. The two teams have met just once before, in the 2021 Uteck Bowl, where the Huskies won 14–10.

== Game Summary ==
The Carabins scored a single on their opening kickoff and never trailed en route to a 30–16 victory over the Huskies. The U Sports football rookie of the year and Carabins quarterback Jose Alejandro "Pepe" Gonzalez-Garza completed 27 of 33 pass attempts for 344 yards and three touchdowns as he was awarded the Ted Morris Trophy winner as the game's most valuable player. Montreal placekicker Philippe Boyer set a new Vanier Cup record by scoring three singles and also had two field goals. Huskies quarterback Jake Farrell had 20 completions on 31 attempts for 229 yards and two interceptions. Montreal's Simon Larose led all receivers with nine catches for 136 yards and one touchdown.

=== Scoring summary ===
First quarter

MTL – Single Boyer 67 yards (15:00) 1–0 MTL
MTL – FG Boyer 24 yards (6:00) 4–0 MTL
SSK – FG Scott 20 yards (2:08) 4–3 MTL

Second quarter

MTL – TD Gourgon 41-yard reception from Gonzalez (Boyer convert) (13:30) 11–3 MTL
SSK – TD Frank 4-yard run (Scott convert) (08:28) 11–10 MTL
SSK – Single Scott 85 yards (08:28) 11–11
MTL – Single Boyer 39 yards (Missed 39-yard field goal attempt) (4:58) 12–11 MTL
MTL – FG Boyer 10 yards (0:00) 15–11 MTL

Third quarter

SSK – FG Scott 32 yards (7:45) 15–14 MTL
MTL – Single Boyer 60 yards (5:34) 16–14 MTL
MTL – TD Dosso 32-yard reception from Gonzalez (Boyer convert) (0:00) 23–14 MTL

Fourth quarter

SSK – MTL conceded safety (11:53) 23–16 MTL
MTL – TD Larose 7-yard reception from Gonzalez (Boyer convert) (2:22) 30–16 MTL
