= 2020 U Sports football season =

- Hardy Cup champions: Cancelled
- Yates Cup champions: Cancelled
- Dunsmore Cup champions: Cancelled
- Loney Bowl champions: Cancelled
- Mitchell Bowl champions: Cancelled
- Uteck Bowl champions: Cancelled

Vanier Cup
- Champions: None, game cancelled

U Sports football seasons seasons
- 2019 2021

The 2020 U Sports football season was scheduled to feature the Canadian football competition under the auspices of U Sports as the highest level of competition for amateur football in Canada in 2020. However, due to the COVID-19 pandemic in Canada, U Sports cancelled the national championships, and the Atlantic University Sport, Canada West, and Ontario University Athletics conferences announced the complete cancellation of their schedules on June 8. The Réseau du sport étudiant du Québec conference waited to decide until September 14, when they also announced that all university sports were cancelled for the remainder of 2020.

== Planned scheduled seasons ==
The season was scheduled to begin with the Montreal Carabins hosting the Sherbrooke Vert et Or on August 28 in Montreal, Quebec. Four Atlantic University Sport teams were scheduled to begin play on August 29. Ten Ontario University Athletics teams were scheduled to open their seasons on August 30. The Canada West conference did not release a schedule, likely due to the uncertainty of the impact of COVID-19.

The conference championships were scheduled for November 14, and the 56th Vanier Cup championship was scheduled for November 28. 27 university teams in Canada were scheduled to play U Sports football in 2020.
