= Jonathan Sénécal =

Canadian gridiron football player (born 1999)

Profile
- Position: Quarterback

Personal information
- Born: October 4, 1999 (age 27)
- Listed height: 6 ft 0 in (1.83 m)
- Listed weight: 201 lb (91 kg)

Career information
- CEGEP: Collège André-Grasset
- University: Montreal
- CFL draft: 2025: 7th round, 62nd overall pick

Career history
- 2025: Montreal Alouettes*
- * Offseason or practice squad member only

Awards and highlights
- Vanier Cup champion (2023); Vanier Cup MVP (2023); Lois and Doug Mitchell Award (2024); Hec Crighton Trophy (2023); First-team All-Canadian (2023)
- Stats at CFL.ca

Jonathan Sénécal (born October 4, 1999) is a Canadian professional football quarterback. He was most recently a member of the Montreal Alouettes of the Canadian Football League (CFL). He was named a Hec Crighton Trophy winner in 2023 as U Sports football's most outstanding player.

== Early life ==
Sénécal was born on October 4, 1999. He played football at Collège André-Grasset in Montreal, Quebec. He threw for a CEGEP record 3,116 yards in 2017, earning CEGEP Rookie of the Year honors. He was named CEGEP MVP in 2018. Sénécal suffered a season-ending torn ACL in the first game of the 2019 season. He played in 19 career games, completing 63 percent of his passes for 5,976 yards, and 59 touchdowns.

== University career ==
In 2019, Sénécal signed a letter of intent to play college football at UConn but later left the school in August 2020 after UConn cancelled the season due to the COVID-19 pandemic. Sénécal was thereafter drawn into Montreal's entourage, being close to Danny Maciocia and Marco Iadeluca, both orbiting Grasset's Phénix team. He yearned for his former teammate Kevin Mital to join him in Montreal, but Mital instead joined the Laval Rouge et Or, Carabins' decades-old rival.

Sénécal then played U Sports football for the Montreal Carabins. During his college career, Sénécal was named player of the week on multiple occasions in the RSEQ, Quebec's university-sports league; four times in 2022; six times in 2023; and twice again in his final season. In 2023, Sénécal was named player of the year in the RSEQ. He won the Hec Crighton Trophy in 2023 after leading Montreal to a 7–1 regular season record while completing 69.6 percent of his passes for 2,215 yards, 15 touchdowns and four interceptions. He was also the first player in school history to win the Hec Crighton. Sénécal was named a first team All-Canadian as well. On November 25, 2023, a few days after winning the Hec Crighton, he helped Montreal win the 58th Vanier Cup by defeating UBC by a score of 16–9. He was named the Vanier Cup MVP after completing 11 of 26 passes for 171 yards and one interception while rushing for a team-leading 50 yards and a touchdown. Sénécal was named the male U Sports Athlete of the Year for the 2023–24 season.

Sénécal set multiple team records throughout his college career, completing 608 of 908 passes (66.96%) for 8,252 yards, and 47 touchdowns.

== Professional career ==
Pre-draft measurables
Height	Weight	40-yard dash	20-yard shuttle	Three-cone drill	Vertical jump	Broad jump	Bench press
6 ft 0 3/8 in (1.84 m)	201 lb (91 kg)	4.68 s	4.08 s	7.14 s	34.5 in (0.88 m)	9 ft 9 7/8 in (2.99 m)	2 reps
All values from CFL Combine

Sénécal was selected by the Montreal Alouettes in the seventh round, with the 62nd overall pick, of the 2025 CFL draft. He was later signed by the team on May 7, 2025. By snapping five times, and completing a pass against the Ottawa Redblacks in a preseason game on May 24, in Montreal, Sénécal became the Carabins's first-ever quarterback to professionally complete a pass. However, Sénécal was part of the final cuts on May 31.
