= Kevin Régimbald-Gagné =

Canadian gridiron football coach and former player (born 1987)

Sherbrooke Vert et Or
- Title: Head coach

Personal information
- Born: July 7, 1987 (age 39); Rouyn-Noranda, Quebec, Canada
- Listed height: 6 ft 1 in (1.85 m)
- Listed weight: 225 lb (102 kg)

Career information
- Position: Linebacker (No. 43)
- University: Sherbrooke
- CFL draft: 2012: 5th round, 35th overall pick

Career history

Playing
- 2012: Saskatchewan Roughriders*
- 2013–2015: Saskatchewan Roughriders
- 2016: Montreal Alouettes*
- * Offseason or practice squad member only

Coaching
- 2016: Sherbrooke Vert et Or (Assistant coach)
- 2017–2023: Sherbrooke Vert et Or (Special teams coordinator)
- 2024–present: Sherbrooke Vert et Or (Head coach)

Awards and highlights
- Grey Cup champion (2013); First-team All-Canadian (2011)

Career CFL statistics
- Games played: 31
- Def Tackles: 7
- ST Tackles: 18
- Stats at CFL.ca (archive)

Kevin Régimbald-Gagné (born July 7, 1987) is the head coach for the Sherbrooke Vert et Or football team of U Sports. He is a former professional Canadian football linebacker who played for three seasons with the Saskatchewan Roughriders of the Canadian Football League (CFL). He is a Grey Cup champion, having won with the Roughriders in 2013.

== University career ==
Régimbald-Gagné played CIS football for the Sherbrooke Vert et Or from 2008 to 2012. He was named a CIS First Team All-Canadian in 2011.

== Professional career ==
=== Saskatchewan Roughriders ===
Régimbald-Gagné was drafted in the fifth round, 35th overall by the Saskatchewan Roughriders in the 2012 CFL draft and signed with the team on May 31, 2012. After attending training camp with the Roughriders in 2012, he returned to play CIS football for the Sherbrooke Vert et Or for a fifth year. He re-signed with the Roughriders on May 17, 2013. After beginning the 2013 season on the practice roster, Régimbald-Gagné played in his first professional game on August 17, 2013, against the Montreal Alouettes. He played in eight regular season games where he recorded six special teams tackles. He also played in one playoff game and recorded a special teams tackle, but was on the injured list when the Roughriders won the 101st Grey Cup. He became the first former Vert et Or player to win a Grey Cup championship.

In 2014, Régimbald-Gagné played in just six regular season games and recorded four special teams tackles. His season came to an end after he suffered a torn medial collateral ligament and torn meniscus in his right knee. In 2015, he had his best professional season as he played in 17 regular season games and had seven defensive tackles and eight special teams tackles.

=== Montreal Alouettes ===
On February 12, 2016, Régimbald-Gagné signed a one-year contract with the Montreal Alouettes. However, he was released by the Alouettes before training camp on May 2, 2016.

== Coaching career ==
Régimbald-Gagné joined his alma mater, the Sherbrooke Vert et Or, in 2016 to serve as an assistant coach for the team. In 2017, he was named the team's special teams coordinator and served in that role for six seasons. On November 22, 2023, it was announced that Régimbald-Gagné had been promoted to head coach.

== Head coaching record ==
Year	Team	Overall	Conference	Standing	Bowl/playoffs
Sherbrooke Vert et Or (RSEQ) (2024–present)
2024	Sherbrooke	1-7	1-7	5th	
2025	Sherbrooke	2-6	2-6	5th	
Sherbrooke:		3-13	3-13		
Total:		3-13			
