= Sherbrooke Vert et Or football =

University Canadian football team

Sherbrooke Vert et Or
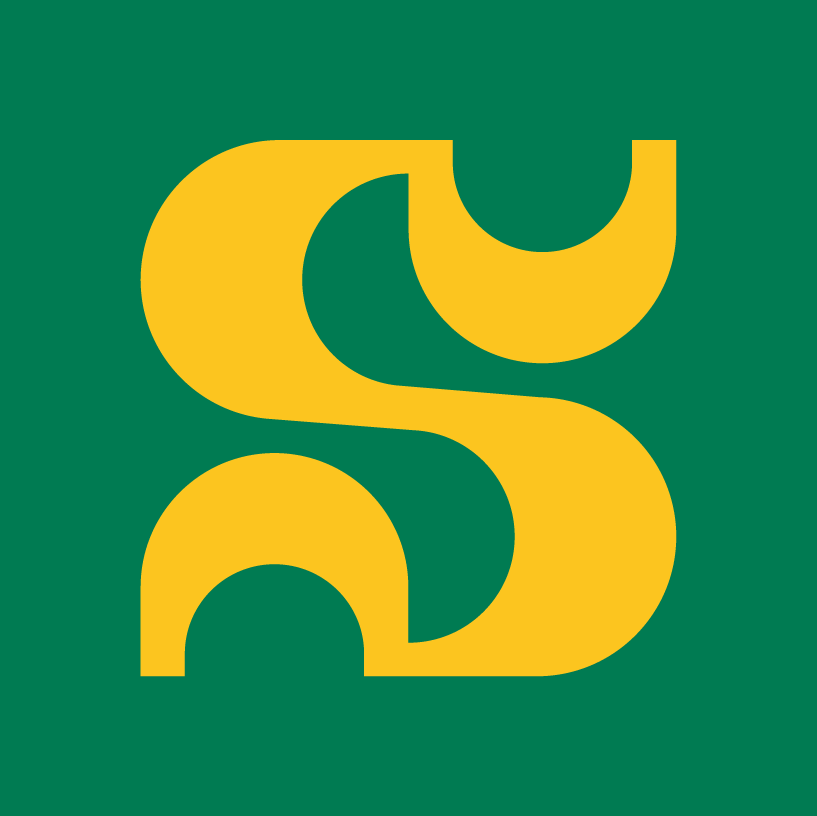
- Sherbrooke Vert et Or logo
- First season: 1971
- Athletic director: Simon Croteau
- Head coach: Kevin Régimbald; 3rd year, 4–20–0 (.167)
- Other staff: Maxime Gauthier (OC); Guillaume Boucher (DC); Louis Leclerc (STC)
- Home stadium: Université de Sherbrooke Stadium
- Year built: 2003
- Stadium capacity: 3359
- Location: Sherbrooke, Quebec
- League: U Sports
- Conference: QUFL/RSEQ (2003–present)
- Past associations: QUAA (1971–1973)
- All-time record: –
- Postseason record: 2–12

Titles
- Vanier Cups: 0
- Yates Cups: 0
- Dunsmore Cups: 0
- Hec Crighton winners: 0
- Colours: Green, Gold, and White
- Mascot: Sherlo
- Outfitter: Under Armour
- Rivals: Bishop's Gaiters
- Website: usherbrooke.ca/football

The Sherbrooke Vert et Or football team represents the Université de Sherbrooke in Sherbrooke, Quebec in the sport of Canadian football in the RSEQ conference of U Sports. The Sherbrooke football team first began play in 1971 in the Quebec Universities Athletic Association, but only played for three seasons. The program was re-started in 2003 and has been in continuous operation since then. The Vert et Or football team is one of two U Sports football programs to have never won a conference championship, with the other being the York Lions.

== History ==
The team began its second incarnation in 2003, thirty years after the first program was dropped in 1973. The Vert et Or first began to play in 1971 in the Quebec Universities Athletic Association as the Sherbrooke Estrien. The varsity team's name was changed to Sherbrooke Vert et Or in 1972. The program was dropped after the 1973 season due to a shift in philosophy as many francophone universities placed an emphasis on community involvement and intramural athletic activities as opposed to intercollegiate athletics. That philosophy shifted back to intercollegiate sports as Université Laval, Université de Montréal and Sherbrooke each began programs in 1996, 2002 and 2003, respectively.

The current football program has seen mixed success, with teams only qualifying for the postseason twice in its first seven years. However, the Vert et Or made progress after posting their first winning season in 2008 followed by their first appearance in the Dunsmore Cup championship in 2010, losing a close game to the Laval Rouge et Or. Then, in 2011, Sherbrooke finished in 2nd place in the Quebec conference and hosted their first playoff game. Consequently, then head coach André Bolduc was named the RSEQ coach of the year. The team finished in third place in 2012 and appeared in their second Dunsmore Cup, but once again lost to Laval. The teams remained competitive through to 2015, with back-to-back winning seasons and playoff appearances, but have since posted four consecutive losing seasons since 2016. The team's current head coach, Mathieu Lecompte, hired in advance of the 2017 season, is the first former Vert et Or football player to become the head of the program. In 2021, the Sherbrooke Vert et Or beat the Laval Rouge et Or for the first time in its history, at home, with a final score of 23-17. After finishing in third place with a 4–4 record in 2022, the Vert & Or regressed in 2023 to a 1–7 record. Consequently, the school decided not to renew Lecompte's contract as he finished with a 14–34 record. On November 22, 2023, it was announced that Kevin Régimbald had been promoted to head coach.

== Recent regular season results ==
Season	Games	Won	Lost	PCT	PF	PA	Standing	Playoffs
2003	8	0	8	0.000	10	491	6th in QUFL	Out of Playoffs
2004	8	3	5	0.375	135	246	5th in QUFL	Out of Playoffs
2005	8	4	4	0.500	175	227	4th in QUFL	Lost to Laval Rouge et Or in semi-final 72-14
2006	8	3	5	0.375	181	210	5th in QUFL	Out of Playoffs
2007	8	4	4	0.500	233	189	5th in QUFL	Out of Playoffs
2008	8	5	3	0.625	190	153	3rd in QUFL	Lost to Concordia Stingers in semi-final 41-20
2009	8	3	5	0.375	153	174	6th in QUFL	Out of Playoffs
2010	9	5	4	0.556	261	205	3rd in QUFL	Defeated Montreal Carabins in semi-final 33-26; Lost to Laval Rouge et Or in Dunsmore Cup 22-17
2011	9	7	2	0.778	255	195	2nd in RSEQ	Lost to Montreal Carabins in semi-final 33-15
2012	9	6	3	0.667	265	209	3rd in RSEQ	Defeated Montreal Carabins in semi-final 42-24; Lost to Laval Rouge et Or in Dunsmore Cup 40-17
2013	8	3	5	0.375	164	197	4th in RSEQ	Lost to Laval Rouge et Or in semi-final 32-11
2014	8	5	3	0.625	239	139	3rd in RSEQ	Lost to Montreal Carabins in semi-final 40-13
2015	8	5	3	0.625	216	153	3rd in RSEQ	Lost to Montreal Carabins in semi-final 24-31
2016	8	3	5	0.375	148	166	5th in RSEQ	Out of Playoffs
2017	8	2	6	0.250	139	242	4th in RSEQ	Lost to Laval Rouge et Or in semi-final 45-0
2018	8	2	6	0.250	84	228	4th in RSEQ	Lost to Laval Rouge et Or in semi-final 40-0
2019	8	2	6	0.250	135	207	5th in RSEQ	Out of Playoffs
2020	Season cancelled due to COVID-19 pandemic							
2021	8	3	5	0.375	159	240	4th in RSEQ	Lost to Montreal Carabins in semi-final 31-3
2022	8	4	4	0.500	164	193	3rd in RSEQ	Lost to Montreal Carabins in semi-final 23-15
2023	8	1	7	0.125	136	280	4th in RSEQ	Lost to Montreal Carabins in semi-final 54-3
2024	8	1	7	0.125	120	235	5th in RSEQ	Out of Playoffs
2025	8	2	6	0.250	122	240	5th in RSEQ	Out of Playoffs
2026	8	1	7	0.125	143	282	5th in RSEQ	Out of Playoffs

== Head coaches ==
#	Name	Term	GC	W	L	Pts	W%	PGC	PW	PL	PW%	Achievements
1	Alain Lapointe	2003–2006	32	10	22	20	.313	1	0	1	.000	
2	André Bolduc	2007–2011	42	24	18	48	.571	4	1	3	.250	RSEQ Coach of the Year (2011)
3	David Lessard	2012–2016	41	22	19	22	.537	5	1	4	.200	
4	Mathieu Lecompte	2017–2023	48	14	34	28	.292	5	0	5	.000	
4	Kevin Régimbald	2024–present	24	4	20	8	.167	—	—	—	.000	

== National award winners ==
- Russ Jackson Award: Clovis Langlois-Boucher (2007)

== Sherbrooke Vert et Or in the CFL ==
As of the start of the 2026 CFL season, four former Vert et Or players are on CFL teams' rosters:

- Alexandre Gagné, Montreal Alouettes
- Anthony Gosselin, Ottawa Redblacks
- Anthony Vandal, Montreal Alouettes
