= McMaster Marauders football =

University Canadian football team

McMaster Marauders
- McMaster Marauders logo
- First season: 1901; 125 years ago
- Athletic director: Shawn Burt
- Head coach: Stefan Ptaszek; 18th year, 99–54 (.647)
- Home stadium: Ron Joyce Stadium
- Year built: 2008
- Stadium capacity: 6,000 (12,000 with temporary seating)
- Stadium surface: Artificial Turf
- Location: Hamilton, Ontario
- League: U Sports
- Conference: OUA (1997-present)
- Past associations: CIRFU (1901-1954); Q-OUAA (1955-1970); OUAA (1971-96)
- All-time record: 413–344–11 (.545)
- Postseason record: 38–38 (.500)

Titles
- Vanier Cups: 1, (2011)
- Uteck Bowls: 1, (2011)
- Mitchell Bowls: 2, (2012, 2014)
- Atlantic Bowls: 1, (1967)
- Yates Cups: 8, (2000, 2001, 2002, 2003, 2011, 2012, 2014, 2019)
- Hec Crighton winners: 5, (Phil Scarfone, Kojo Aidoo, Ben Chapdelaine, Jesse Lumsden, Kyle Quinlan)

Current uniform
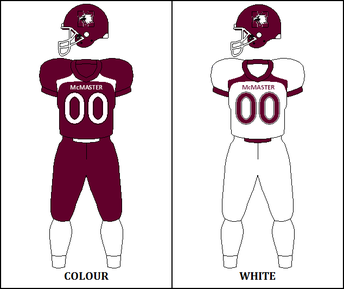
- Colours: Maroon, Grey, and White
- Mascot: Mac the Marauder
- Outfitter: Nike Inc.
- Website: marauders.ca/football

The McMaster Marauders football team represents McMaster University based in Hamilton, Ontario, Canada. The team plays U Sports football in the Ontario University Athletics conference. The Marauders have been playing organized football since 1901 when they played their first exhibition game in the Canadian Intercollegiate Rugby Football Union. The team has appeared in four Vanier Cup games, winning one in 2011.

== History ==
The earliest reference of the sport of football at McMaster was during a meeting on November 30, 1898, when the university's athletic association's debated about expanding into the sport of football. The association had reached a consensus two days later that the lateness of the season made it pointless to start the sport for that year. The university would form a football team in the following year.

The McMaster Marauder's football team played their first football game in an exhibition game against the University of Toronto Faculty of Dentistry in 1901, losing 1-0. The Marauders won their first game in an exhibition match against Royal Military College of Canada with a score of 17-5. The Marauders played their first regular season game in 1902, losing their first game to the University of Toronto in a one-game season. The Marauders would not win their first game until the following season, where they also made their first playoff appearance. The early football team at McMaster would not have a head coach until the end of World War I, with most of the coaching duties taken up by the team captains.

McMaster athletic director Ivor Wynne built up the football program, and moved the team from the Hamilton Amateur Athletic Association Grounds to the larger Civic Stadium in 1949. In 1952, he convinced the Canadian Intercollegiate Athletic Union (CIAU) to admit McMaster into senior football competition along with McGill, Queen's, Toronto, and Western. Jack Kennedy became the team's coach in 1965, and led the football team to an 11–0 regular season in 1965, and its first appearance in the Vanier Cup national championship game.

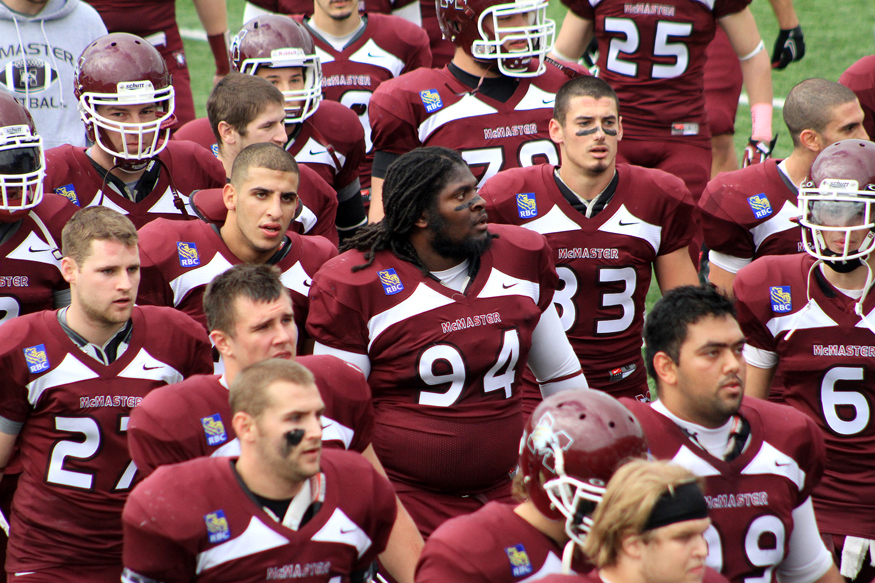
McMaster Marauders players in 2011

The Marauders had made 23 consecutive OUA post-season appearances, having missed the playoffs in the 1997 season and then again in 2021. During this period the Marauders have won all eight of their Yates Cup championships (awarded to the champion of the OUA conference), and advanced to the Vanier Cup semi-final eight times. The Vanier Cup semi-finals is played in two bowl game, the Mitchell Bowl (Churchill Bowl prior to 2003) and the Uteck Bowl (Atlantic Bowl prior to 2001). The Marauders football team have also made an appearance at the Churchill and Mitchell Bowls in 2000, 2001, 2003, 2012, 2014, and 2019. The Marauders have also appeared at the Atlantic and Uteck Bowls, in 1961, 1964, 1967, 2002 and 2011. Amongst these appearances the Marauders advanced to the Vanier Cup three times, in the 1967 Atlantic Bowl, the 2011 Uteck Bowl, and the 2012 and 2014 Mitchell Bowls.

The Marauders would make their first Vanier Cup appearance in 1967 at the 3rd Vanier Cup, going on to lose 10-9 to the Alberta Golden Bears. After a 44-year absence from the cup final the Marauders won their first (and only) U Sports championship at the 2011 47th Vanier Cup, beating Laval Rouge et Or 41-38 in overtime. In the following year the Marauders lost against Laval in the 48th Vanier Cup. In 2014, they lost 20-19 to the Montréal Carabins in the 50th Vanier Cup. In addition to the championships presently offered by U Sports and OUA, the Marauders had also been awarded a CCIFC championship in 1967, as well as several OIFC championship, in 1957, 1958, 1962, 1963 and 1964.

== Season-by-season record ==
The following is the record of the McMaster Marauders football team since 2000:

Season	Games	Won	Lost	Ties	PCT	PF	PA	Standing	Playoffs
2000	8	7	1	0	0.875	325	86	1st in OUA	Defeated Waterloo Warriors in semi-final 44-20; Defeated Laurier Golden Hawks in Yates Cup final 48-23; Lost to Ottawa Gee-Gees in Churchill Bowl 20-15
2001	8	7	0	1	0.938	301	81	1st in OUA	Defeated York Yeomen in quarter-final 62-0; Defeated Western Ontario Mustangs in semi-final 46-20; Defeated Ottawa Gee-Gees in Yates Cup final 30-22; Lost to Manitoba Bisons in Mitchell Bowl 27-7
2002	8	8	0	0	1.000	310	100	1st in OUA	Defeated Guelph Gryphons in quarter-final 61-10; Defeated York Yeomen in semi-final 29-14; Defeated Queen's Golden Gaels in Yates Cup final 30-22; Lost to Saint Mary's Huskies in Churchill Bowl 36-25
2003	8	8	0	0	1.000	424	87	1st in OUA	Defeated Waterloo Warriors in quarter-final 70-7; Defeated Windsor Lancers in semi-final 55-15; Defeated Laurier Golden Hawks in Yates Cup final 41-17; Lost to Laval Rouge et Or in Mitchell Bowl 36-32
2004	8	7	1	0	0.875	395	119	2nd in OUA	Defeated Western Ontario Mustangs in semi-final 40-23; Lost to Laurier Golden Hawks in Yates Cup final 31-19
2005	8	5	3	0	0.625	283	209	4th in OUA	Defeated Windsor Lancers in quarter-final 49-19; Lost to Laurier Golden Hawks in semi-final 43-21
2006	8	6	2	–	0.625	253	156	4th in OUA	Lost to Queen's Golden Gaels in quarter-final 25-19
2007	8	5	3	–	0.625	230	221	4th in OUA	Lost to Guelph Gryphons in quarter-final 25-21
2008	8	4	4	–	0.500	230	198	6th in OUA	Lost to Laurier Golden Hawks in quarter-final 29-0
2009	8	6	2	–	0.750	232	148	5th in OUA	Defeated Ottawa Gee-Gees in quarter-final 27-15; Lost to Queen's Golden Gaels in semi-final 32-6
2010	8	6	2	–	0.750	289	200	3rd in OUA	Defeated Queen's Golden Gaels in quarter-final 40-19; Lost to Western Mustangs in semi-final 34-28
2011	8	7	1	–	0.875	277	146	2nd in OUA	Defeated Queen's Golden Gaels in semi-final 40-13; Defeated Western Mustangs in Yates Cup final 41-19; Defeated Acadia Axemen in Uteck Bowl 45-21; Defeated Laval Rouge et Or in 47th Vanier Cup 41-38
2012	8	8	0	–	1.000	365	125	1st in OUA	Defeated Western Mustangs in semi-final 42-28; Defeated Guelph Gryphons in Yates Cup final 30-13; Defeated Calgary Dinos in Mitchel Bowl 45-6; Lost to Laval Rouge et Or in 48th Vanier Cup 37-14
2013	8	5	3	–	0.625	292	175	4th in OUA	Defeated Ottawa Gee-Gees in quarter-final 41-7; Lost to Western Mustangs in semi final 32-3
2014	8	7	1	–	0.875	291	142	1st in OUA	Defeated Ottawa Gee-Gees in semi-final 42-31; Defeated Guelph Gryphons in Yates Cup final 20-15; Defeated Mount Allison Mounties in Mitchell Bowl 24-12; Lost to Montréal Carabins in 50th Vanier Cup 20-19
2015	8	6	2	–	0.750	355	211	3rd in OUA	Lost to Laurier Golden Hawks in quarter-final 29-15
2016	8	6	2	–	0.750	260	87	3rd in OUA	Defeated Guelph Gryphons in quarter-final 17-11; Lost to Laurier Golden Hawks in semi-final 21-17
2017	8	6	2	–	0.750	209	115	3rd in OUA	Defeated Queen's Gaels in quarter-final 12-9; Lost to Laurier Golden Hawks in semi-final 19-6
2018	8	5	3	–	0.625	151	163	5th in OUA	Lost to Carleton Ravens in quarter-final 30-25
2019	8	6	2	–	0.750	228	151	2nd in OUA	Defeated Guelph Gryphons in semi-final 19-9; Defeated Western Mustangs in Yates Cup final 29-15; Lost to Calgary Dinos in Mitchell Bowl 30-17
2020	Season cancelled due to COVID-19 pandemic								
2021	6	3	3	–	0.500	146	125	5th in OUA West	Did not qualify
2022	8	2	6	–	0.250	140	118	8th in OUA	Did not qualify
2023	8	2	6	–	0.250	191	187	10th in OUA	Did not qualify
2024	8	4	4	–	0.500	212	138	7th in OUA	Lost to Western Mustangs in quarter-final 46-10
2025	8	4	4	–	0.500	211	234	5th in OUA	Lost to Queen's Gaels in quarter-final 46-10
2026	8	6	2	–	0.750	182	131	3rd in OUA	Lost to Ottawa Gee-Gees in quarter-final 33-17

== National postseason results ==
Vanier Cup Era (1965-current)
Year	Game	Opponent	Result
1967	Atlantic Bowl Vanier Cup	St. FX Alberta	W 7-0 L 9-10
2000	Churchill Bowl	Ottawa	L 15-20
2001	Churchill Bowl	Manitoba	L 6-27
2002	Churchill Bowl	Saint Mary's	L 25-36
2003	Mitchell Bowl	Laval	L 32-36
2011	Uteck Bowl Vanier Cup	Acadia Laval	W 45-21 W 41-38
2012	Mitchell Bowl Vanier Cup	Calgary Laval	W 45-6 L 14-37
2014	Mitchell Bowl Vanier Cup	Mount Allison Montreal	W 24-12 L 19-20
2019	Mitchell Bowl	Calgary	L 17-30

McMaster is 4–5 in national semi-final games and 1–3 in the Vanier Cup.

== Head coaches ==
Name	Years	Notes
E. G. H. Worden	1920–1923	
G. Wallace	1924	
Harry Hobbs	1925	
E. K. Smith	1926–1928	
R. Robertson	1929	
Arthur Burridge	1930–1932	
Fred Veale	1933–1934	
Glen Small	1935–1938	
Gordon Price	1939	
No Team	1940	
Arthur Burridge	1941	
Gordon Price	1942–1943	
No Team	1944	
Tommy Henderson	1945	
Fred Veale	1946–1947	
Tommy Henderson	1948	
Bernie Taylor	1949–1950	
Al Smith	1951–1960	
Bob Dawson	1961–1965	
Jack Kennedy	1966–1968	
Ray Johnson	1969–1971	
Jack Kennedy	1972	
Ray Johnson	1973–1980	
Bernie Custis	1981–1988	
Steve Bruno	1989–1993	
Al Bruno	1994–1996	
Greg Marshall	1997–2003	
Marcello Campanaro	2004–2005	
Stefan Ptaszek	2006–2015	
Greg Knox	2016–2018	
Tom Flaxman and Scott Brady	2018	Interim
Stefan Ptaszek	2019–present	

== National award winners ==
- Hec Crighton Trophy: Phil Scarfone (1984), Kojo Aidoo (2000), Ben Chapdelaine (2001), Jesse Lumsden (2004), Kyle Quinlan (2012)
- J. P. Metras Trophy: Ben D'Aguilar (2012)
- Peter Gorman Trophy: Kojo Aidoo (1998), Daniel Vandervoort (2013)
- Frank Tindall Trophy: Bernie Custis (1982), Greg Marshall (2000), Stefan Ptaszek (2012)

== Records ==
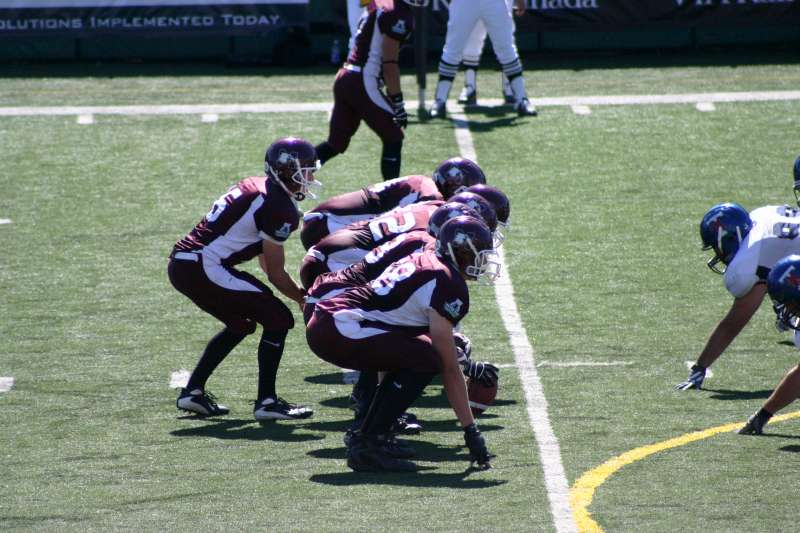
The McMaster Marauders facing the Toronto Varsity Blues

The Marauders currently hold a number of Ontario University Athletics records, both in terms of the team, as well as individuals who had played for the Marauders. Current records held by the Marauders are:

=== Team records ===
- Most points for in a season — 2003 season (424 points)
- Most touchdowns in a season — 2004 season (49 touchdowns)
- Most yards rushing in a season — 2003 season (2807 yards)
- Most penalty yardage in a season — 2005 season (1170 yards)
- Most yards passing in a game — 17 October 1981 vs. Waterloo Warriors (10 interceptions)
- Most consecutive wins — 2011 season - 2012 season (21 wins)

=== Individual records ===
- Most touchdowns in a season: Jesse Lumsden, 2004 season (21 touchdowns)
- Most touchdowns in a career: Jesse Lumsden, 2001-04 seasons (47 touchdowns)
- Most field goals in a season: Michael Ray, 2003 season (22 field goals)
- Most converts in a season: Michael Ray, 2004 season (48 conversions)
- Most converts in a career: Michael Ray, 2001-04 seasons (148 conversions)
- Most yards rushing in a season: Jesse Lumsden, 2004 season (1816 yards)
- Most rushing touchdowns in a season: Jesse Lumsden, 2004 season (21 touchdowns)
- Most rushing touchdowns in a career: Jesse Lumsden, 2001-04 seasons (46 touchdowns)
- Longest rush: Jesse Lumsden, 11 September 2004 vs. Waterloo Warriors (108 yards)
- Most rushing attempts in a game: Kyle Pyear, 28 September 2002 vs. Laurier Golden Hawks (39 attempted rushes)

== McMaster Marauders in the CFL ==
As of the start of the 2026 CFL season, six former Marauders players are on CFL teams' rosters:

- Owen Hubert, Hamilton Tiger-Cats
- Jacob Mason, Montreal Alouettes
- Tyson Middlemost, Hamilton Tiger-Cats
- Tommy Nield, Winnipeg Blue Bombers
- Ethan Stuart, Winnipeg Blue Bombers
- Jakub Szott, Hamilton Tiger-Cats

In addition, former Marauders quarterback Marshall Ferguson is on the payroll of TSN as a broadcaster.
