= Montreal Carabins football =

U Sports football team

Montreal Carabins
- Montreal Carabins logo
- First season: 2002; 24 years ago
- Athletic director: Manon Simard
- Head coach: Marco Iadeluca; 5th year, 45–10 (.818)
- Other staff: Denis Touchette (DC)
- Home stadium: CEPSUM Stadium
- Stadium capacity: 5100
- Stadium surface: FieldTurf
- Location: Montreal, Quebec
- League: U Sports
- Conference: QUFL/RSEQ (2002 - present)
- Past associations: OIFC (1966); CCIFC (1967-1970); QUAA (1971)
- All-time record: 136–51–0 (.727)
- Postseason record: 30–19 (.612)

Titles
- Vanier Cups: 3 (2014, 2023, 2025)
- Uteck Bowls: 5 (2014, 2019, 2023, 2025, 2026)
- Mitchell Bowls: 1 (2015)
- Dunsmore Cups: 7 (2014, 2015, 2019, 2021, 2023; Jacques-Dussault Cup: 2025, 2026)
- Hec Crighton winners: 1 (Jonathan Sénécal, 2023)

Current uniform
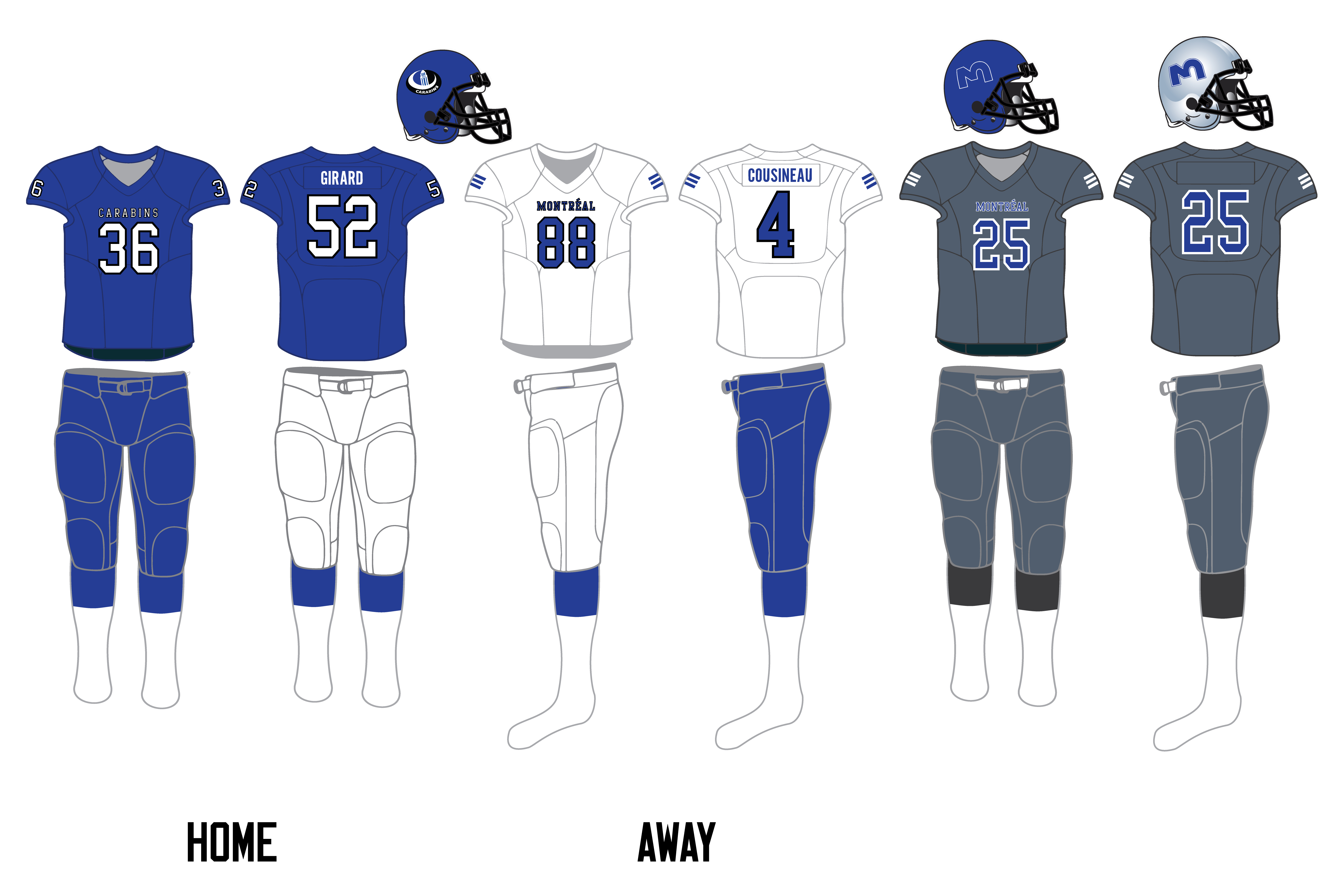
- Colours: Royal Blue, White, and Black
- Outfitter: Adidas
- Rivals: Laval Rouge et Or
- Website: carabins.umontreal.ca/football

The Montreal Carabins football team represents the University of Montreal in Montreal, Quebec in the sport of Canadian football in U Sports. The Carabins program has been in operation since its resurrection in the 2002 football season and has established itself as a provincial and national powerhouse with seven RSEQ conference championships and three national championships, in 2014, 2023 & 2025.

== History ==
The team began its second incarnation in 2002 after over thirty years of being dormant. The Carabins first began play in 1966 in the Ontario Intercollegiate Football Conference and continued play for the next six seasons. The program was dropped after the 1971 season due to a shift in philosophy as many francophone universities placed an emphasis on community involvement and intramural athletic activities as opposed to intercollegiate athletics. That philosophy has shifted back to intercollegiate sports as Université Laval, Montréal and Université de Sherbrooke each began programs in 1996, 2002 and 2003, respectively.

The current program has seen marked success in the regular season, having qualified for the playoffs in every season since 2003. However, the program had difficulty winning their conference championship in the early years, with five losses in their first five appearances. That changed under the leadership of former head coach, Danny Maciocia, in 2014, as the Carabins defeated the Laval Rouge et Or to win their first Dunsmore Cup. The team then won the national semi-final Uteck Bowl against the Manitoba Bisons to qualify for the first Vanier Cup game in program history. In the 50th Vanier Cup, the Carabins defeated the McMaster Marauders by a score of 20–19 to win the first national championship in program history.

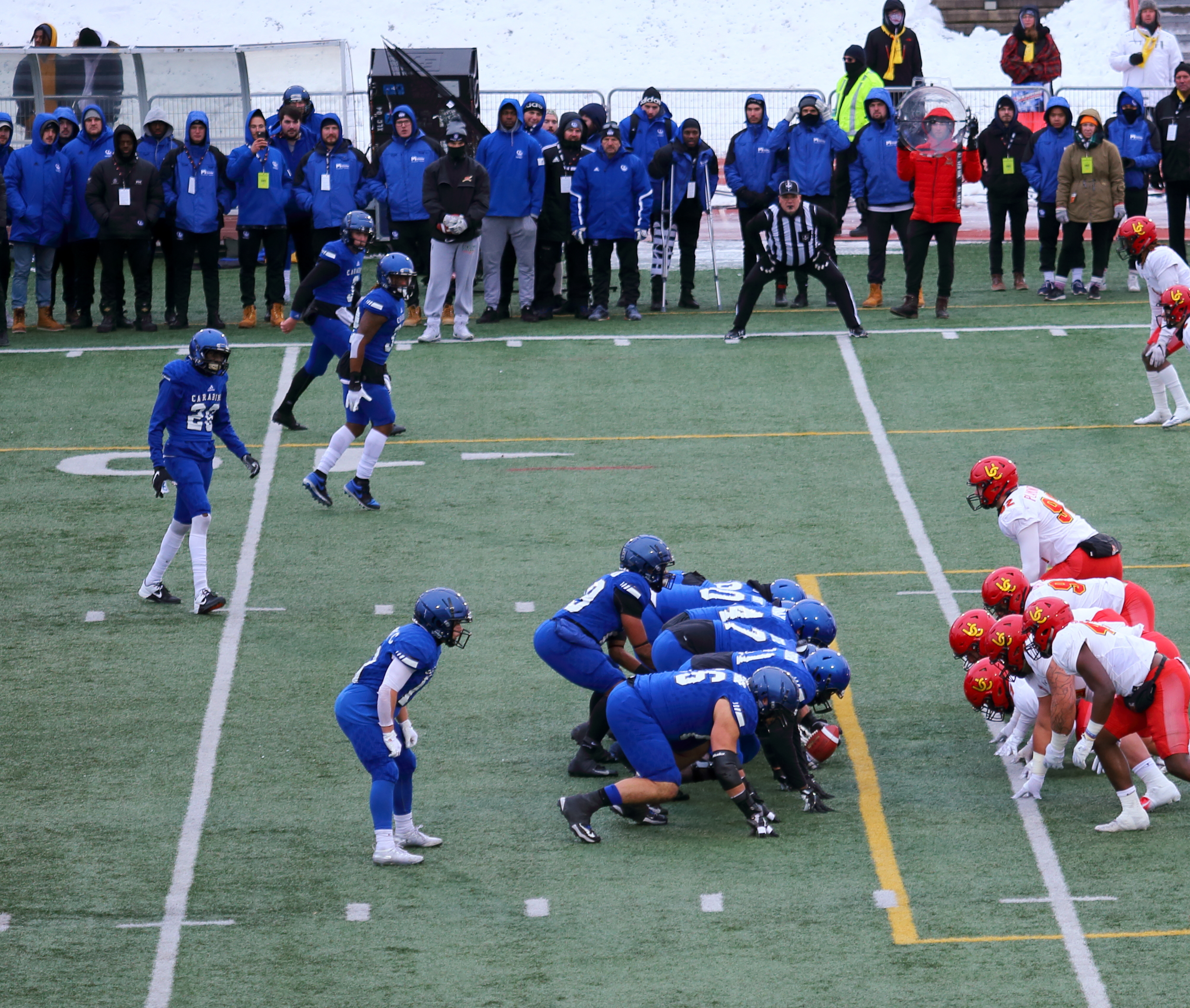
The Carabins on offence in the 55th Vanier Cup game

The team won two more Dunsmore Cups in 2015 and 2019, but eventually lost in the Vanier Cup games in both seasons to the UBC Thunderbirds and the Calgary Dinos. Maciocia resigned following the 2019 season to join the Canadian Football League's Montreal Alouettes and was replaced by Marco Iadeluca on February 11, 2020.

In 2021, the first season after the COVID-19 pandemic, the team finished first of the regular season with a record of 7-1, and two straight wins against their rivals, the Laval Rouge et Or. They hosted the 2021 Dunsmore Cup at home, and managed to lift it in Montréal - their fourth Dunsmore Cup - following a decisive victory of 28-19 against Laval, the program's first Dunsmore Cup win at home - and finished the season with three wins against their rivals for the first time in their history.

In 2022, the team finished second in the RSEQ with a record of 6-2. They participated in their ninth straight Dunsmore Cup, and lost 24-25 in Québec, against the Rouge et Or on a single.

For the 2023 campaign, the 2022 provincial runner-up finished the regular season with a 7-1 record, suffering their only loss in the final season game at home to the Concordia Stingers, with a score of 14-16 on a walk-off field goal on a meaningless game. In a rare occurrence, Montreal completely outscored Laval in Quebec with a score of 31-14, thanks to their impressive six turnovers. They also shut down the Rouge et Or 28-0 at home, marking Laval's second-ever scoreless game. The Carabins then secured their fifth Dunsmore Cup with a 12-6 victory over Laval in Montreal. In the following week, Montreal defeated the No. 1-ranked team in Canada, the Western Mustangs, by scoring 29-3 in the Uteck Bowl. To cap off the successful campaign, which had already crowned Montreal quarterback Jonathan Sénécal with the HEC Creighton Trophy for the most outstanding player and the Presidents' Trophy for the most outstanding defensive player, Harold Miessan, the Carabins won their second Vanier Cup title, defeating the UBC Thunderbirds 16-9 in the 58th Vanier Cup. During their four playoff games, Montreal did not concede a single touchdown and finished with an impressive combined score of 111-21.

While under the Montreal Alouettes colors in a preseason game in 2025, Jonathan Sénécal, Montreal's quarterback from 2021 to 2024, became the Carabins' first-ever quarterback to complete a pass as a professional.

In 2025, starting rookie quarterback José Alejandro «Pepe» Gonzalez Garza won the RSEQ's Rookie of the Year award. He threw for 2,284 yards, and scored 19 passing touchdowns, a team record. « Pepe » also received the Peter Gorman trophy awarded to the best Canadian rookie, and the Ted Morris Memorial Trophy given to the Vanier Cup's MVP. He led the team to its second Vanier Cup win in three seasons.

== Season-by-season record ==
Season	P	W	L	PCT	PF	PA	Standing	Playoffs
2002	8	0	8	0.000	62	359	5th in QUFL	Did not qualify
2003	8	6	2	0.625	220	160	3rd in QUFL	Lost to Concordia Stingers in semi-final 35-8
2004	8	8	0	1.000	256	75	1st in QUFL	Defeated McGill Redmen in semi-final 38-18; Lost to Laval Rouge et Or in Dunsmore Cup 30-12
2005	8	6	2	0.875	229	158	2nd in QUFL	Defeated Concordia Stingers in semi-final 28-17; Lost to Laval Rouge et Or in Dunsmore Cup 19-13
2006	8	6	2	0.750	188	138	3rd in QUFL	Lost to Concordia Stingers in semi-final 23-3
2007	8	4	4	0.500	151	149	4th in QUFL	Lost to Laval Rouge et Or in semi-final 28-16
2008	8	5	3	0.625	273	138	4th in QUFL	Lost to Laval Rouge et Or in semi-final 32-7
2009	8	5	3	0.625	222	146	2nd in QUFL	Defeated Bishop's Gaiters in semi-final 40-15; Lost to Laval Rouge et Or in Dunsmore Cup 31-7
2010	9	5	4	0.556	227	151	2nd in QUFL	Lost to Sherbrooke Vert et Or in semi-final 33-26
2011	9	6	3	0.667	202	152	3rd in RSEQ	Defeated Sherbrooke Vert et Or in semi-final 33-15; Lost to Laval Rouge et Or in Dunsmore Cup 30-7
2012	9	8	1	0.889	299	102	2nd in RSEQ	Lost to Sherbrooke Vert et Or in semi-final 42-24
2013	8	5	3	0.625	211	120	3rd in RSEQ	Defeated Bishop's Gaiters in semi-final 51-8; Lost to Laval Rouge et Or in Dunsmore Cup 14-11
2014	8	7	1	0.875	271	100	2nd in RSEQ	Defeated Sherbrooke Vert et Or in semi-final 40-13; Defeated Laval Rouge et Or in Dunsmore Cup 12-9 (OT); Defeated Manitoba Bisons in Uteck Bowl 29-26; Defeated McMaster Marauders in 50th Vanier Cup 20-19
2015	8	6	2	0.750	232	109	2nd in RSEQ	Defeated Sherbrooke Vert et Or in semi-final 31-24; Defeated Laval Rouge et Or in Dunsmore Cup 18-16; Defeated Guelph Gryphons in Mitchell Bowl 25-10; Lost to UBC Thunderbirds in 51st Vanier Cup 26-23
2016	8	7	1	0.875	296	72	1st in RSEQ	Defeated McGill Redmen in semi-final 42-0; Lost to Laval Rouge et Or in Dunsmore Cup 20-17
2017	7	6	1	0.857	176	93	2nd in RSEQ	Defeated Concordia Stingers in semi-final 42-20; Lost to Laval Rouge et Or in Dunsmore Cup 25-22
2018	8	6	2	0.750	256	46	2nd in RSEQ	Defeated McGill Redmen in semi-final 48-2; Lost to Laval Rouge et Or in Dunsmore Cup 14-1
2019	8	6	2	0.750	144	93	2nd in RSEQ	Defeated McGill Redmen in semi-final 31-0; Defeated Laval Rouge et Or in Dunsmore Cup 25-10; Defeated Acadia Axemen in Uteck Bowl 38-0; Lost to Calgary Dinos in 55th Vanier Cup 27-13
2020	Season cancelled due to COVID-19 pandemic							
2021	8	7	1	0.875	226	113	1st in RSEQ	Defeated Sherbrooke Vert et Or in semi-final 31-3; Defeated Laval Rouge et Or in Dunsmore Cup 28-19; Lost to Saskatchewan Huskies in Uteck Bowl 14-10
2022	8	6	2	0.750	163	124	2nd in RSEQ	Defeated Sherbrooke Vert et Or in semi-final 23-15; Lost to Laval Rouge et Or in Dunsmore Cup 25-24
2023	8	7	1	0.875	288	93	1st in RSEQ	Defeated Sherbrooke Vert et Or in semi-final 54-3; Defeated Laval Rouge et Or in Dunsmore Cup 12-6; Defeated Western Mustangs in Uteck Bowl 29-3; Defeated UBC Thunderbirds in 58th Vanier Cup 16-9
2024	8	7	1	0.875	273	131	2nd in RSEQ	Defeated McGill Redbirds in semi-final 42-3; Lost to Laval Rouge et Or in Dunsmore Cup 22-17
2025	8	6	2	0.750	280	128	2nd in RSEQ	Defeated Concordia Stingers in semi-final 51-2; Defeated Laval Rouge et Or in Jacques-Dussault Cup 31-29; Defeated Saint Mary's Huskies in Uteck Bowl 49-19; Defeated Saskatchewan Huskies in 60th Vanier Cup 30-16
2026	8	6	2	0.750	253	196	2nd in RSEQ	Defeated McGill Redbirds in semi-final 28-21; Defeated Laval Rouge et Or in Jacques-Dussault Cup 14-10; Defeated UBC Thunderbirds in Uteck Bowl 30-13; Play against Western Mustangs in 61st Vanier Cup

== National Postseason Results ==
Vanier Cup Era (1965–current)
Year	Game	Opponent	Result
2014	Uteck Bowl; Vanier Cup	Manitoba; McMaster	W 29–26; W 20–19
2015	Mitchell Bowl; Vanier Cup	Guelph; UBC	W 25–10; L 23–26
2019	Uteck Bowl; Vanier Cup	Acadia; Calgary	W 38–0; L 13–27
2021	Uteck Bowl	Saskatchewan	L 10–14
2023	Uteck Bowl; Vanier Cup	Western; UBC	W 29–3; W 16–9
2025	Uteck Bowl; Vanier Cup	Saint Mary's; Saskatchewan	W 49–19; W 30–16
2026	Uteck Bowl; Vanier Cup	UBC; Western	W 30–13; TBD

Montreal is 6–1 in national semi-final games and 3–2 in the Vanier Cup.

== Head coaches ==
Name	Years	Notes
Jacques Dussault	2002–2005	
Marc Santerre	2006–2010	
Danny Maciocia	2011–2019	
Marco Iadeluca	2020–present	

== National award winners ==
- Hec Crighton Trophy: Jonathan Sénécal (2023)
- Presidents' Trophy: Nicky Farinaccio (2022), Harold Miessan (2023)
- Peter Gorman Trophy: Maxime Gagnier (2003), Martin Gagné (2005), Enrique James Leclair (2024), Jose Alejandro Gonzalez-Garza (2025)
- Lois and Doug Mitchell Award: Jonathan Sénécal (2024)

== Carabins in the CFL ==
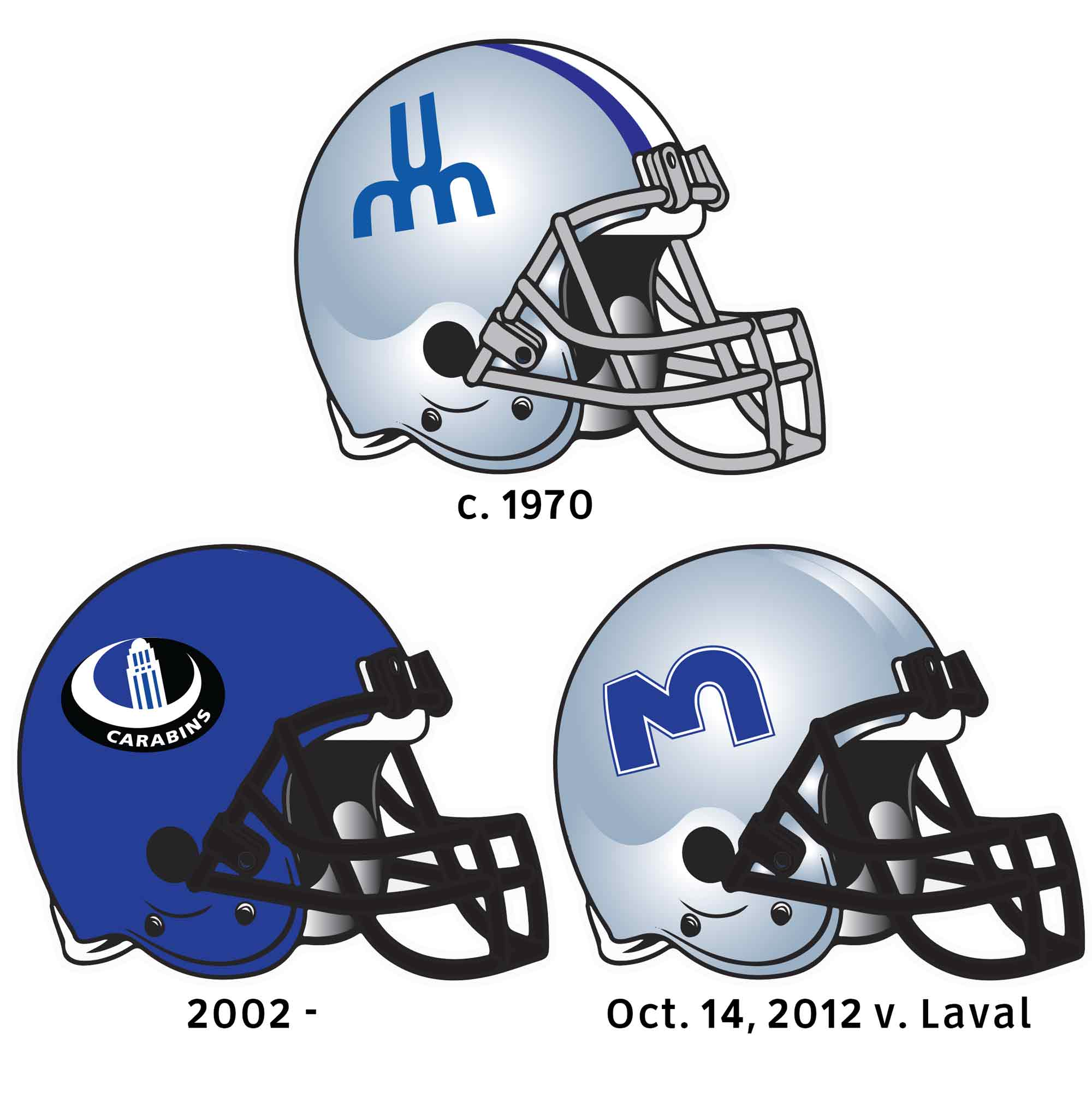
Montreal Carabins helmets

As of the start of the 2026 CFL season, 13 former Carabins players are on CFL teams' rosters:

- Charles-Elliot Bouliane, Winnipeg Blue Bombers
- Louis-Philippe Bourassa, Montreal Alouettes
- Michael Brodrique, Ottawa Redblacks
- Régis Cibasu, Montreal Alouettes
- Alassane Diouf, Ottawa Redblacks
- Kerfalla Exumé, Saskatchewan Roughriders
- Louis-Philippe Gauthier, Toronto Argonauts
- Brian Harelimana, Toronto Argonauts
- Redha Kramdi, Winnipeg Blue Bombers
- Gabriel Lessard, Montreal Alouettes
- Pier-Olivier Lestage, Montreal Alouettes
- Benoit Marion, Saskatchewan Roughriders
- Jeremiah Ojo, Toronto Argonauts
