= Collège André-Grasset =

Private college in Montreal, Canada

- Type: Private College
- Established: 1927
- Founder: Société des Prêtres de Saint-Sulpice de Montréal
- Affiliations: ACCC, CCAA, QSSF
- President: Isabelle Foisy
- Director: Patrick Caron
- Location: 1001, boulevard Crémazie Est; Montreal, Quebec, Canada; H2M 1M3; 45°33′02″N 73°37′58″W
- Campus: Urban
- Language: French
- Sports team: Phenix
- Colours: Black and Red
- Website: http://www.grasset.qc.ca

Collège André-Grasset is a private college in Montreal, Quebec, Canada. It is located near the Quebec Autoroute 40 and the Crémazie metro station.

== History ==
The college was founded in 1927 by the priests of Saint-Sulpice Seminary (Montreal) and named after priest and martyr André Grasset. The school was built at the request of the Archbishop of Montreal. In 1975, the school opened a gym, and a multipurpose room was inaugurated in 1990.

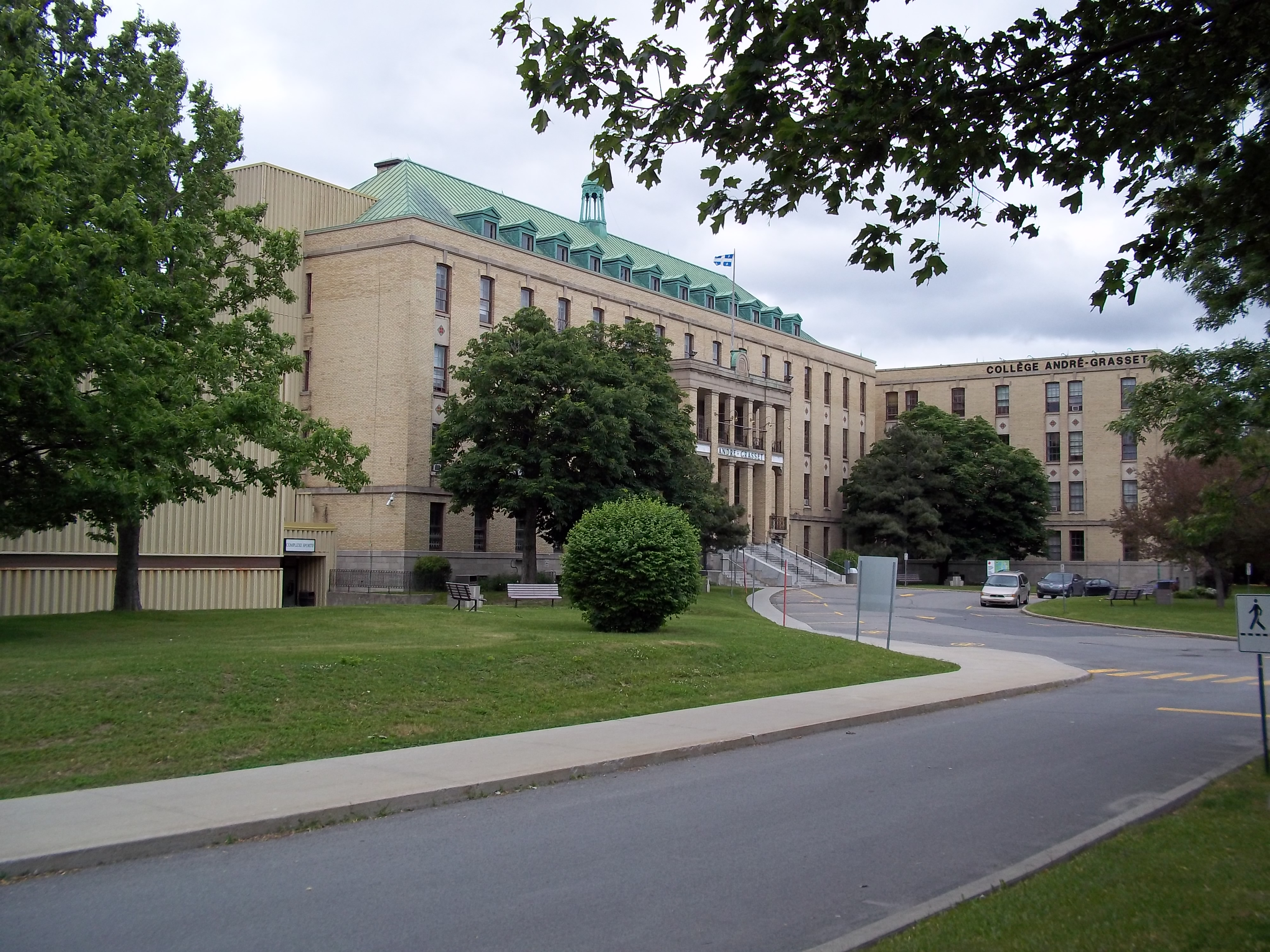
Collège André-Grasset's entrance

Since 2003, the college offers technical training courses at the Institute Grasset. The school's president is Isabelle Foisy and its director is Patrick Caron.

== Programs ==
Nine regular programs are open to the students of Collège André-Grasset.

There is the natural sciences program, DecPLUS natural sciences program, informatics and mathematics sciences program, sciences, letters and arts program (SLA program), human sciences program, human sciencesPLUS program, arts, letters and communication program, arts concentration program, and sports concentration program.

Additionally, there are summer classes, and adult education (Institut Grasset program) offered by the school.
