= Yates Cup =

Sports trophy

- The Yates Cup in 2013
- Sport: U Sports football
- League: Ontario University Athletics
- Awarded for: Playoff champion of OUA football
- Local name: La Coupe Yates (French)

History
- First award: 1898
- First winner: Toronto Varsity Blues
- Most wins: Western Mustangs (36)
- Most recent: Western Mustangs
- Website: www.oua.ca/sports/fball/index

The Yates Cup (French: La Coupe Yates) is a Canadian sports trophy, presented annually to the winner of the Ontario University Athletics football conference of U Sports. It is the oldest still-existing football trophy in North America, dating back to 1898 and surpassing both the Grey Cup and the Little Brown Jug in longevity.

The Yates Cup was donated by Dr. Henry Brydges Yates of McGill University.

Until 1971 it was awarded to the winner of the Senior Intercollegiate Football League regular season, with playoffs occurring only if there was a tie for first place, or the second-place team had defeated the first-place team in league play. Since 1971, it is awarded to the OUA football champion.

The winner of the Yates Cup goes on to play in either the Uteck Bowl or the Mitchell Bowl, depending on annual rotations.

Asteroid (12447) YatesCup is named after the Yates Cup.

== Yates Cup games ==
Notes: From 1915 to 1918, the trophy was not presented due to World War I. From 1940 to 1945, the trophy was not presented due to World War II. From 1974 to 1978, due to a change in conference structure, the Yates Cup was presented to both an Eastern Division and a Western Division winner. In 1979 the Eastern and Western Division champions played each other in a Vanier Cup semi-final game, which also determined the Yates Cup championship. In 1980, the Cup returned to a single winner when the Eastern Division formed the independent OQIFC.

| Year | Date | Champion | Score | Runner-up | Score | OT | Host city | Stadium | Attendance | Division |
|---|---|---|---|---|---|---|---|---|---|---|
| 1898 | | Toronto | No specific deciding game. Champion had most wins of the regular season. | | | | | | | |
| 1899 | | Toronto | No specific deciding game. Champion had most wins of the regular season. | | | | | | | |
| 1900 | | Queen's | No specific deciding game. Champion had most wins of the regular season. | | | | | | | |
| 1901 | | Toronto | No specific deciding game. Champion had most wins of the regular season. | | | | | | | |
| 1902 | | McGill | No specific deciding game. Champion had most wins of the regular season. | | | | | | | |
| 1903 | | Toronto | No specific deciding game. Champion had most wins of the regular season. | | | | | | | |
| 1904 | Nov. 19 | Queen's | 6 | McGill | 0 | | Ottawa | Lansdowne Park | 1,500 | |
| 1905 | | Toronto | No specific deciding game. Champion had most wins of the regular season. | | | | | | | |
| 1906 | | McGill | No specific deciding game. Champion had most wins of the regular season. | | | | | | | |
| 1907 | | Ottawa | No specific deciding game. Champion had most wins of the regular season. | | | | | | | |
| 1908 | Nov. 21 | Toronto | 12 | Queen's | 0 | | Ottawa | Varsity Oval | | |
| 1909 | | Toronto | No specific deciding game. Champion had most wins of the regular season. | | | | | | | |
| 1910 | | Toronto | No specific deciding game. Champion had most wins of the regular season. | | | | | | | |
| 1911 | | Toronto | No specific deciding game. Champion had most wins of the regular season. | | | | | | | |
| 1912 | Nov. 16 | McGill | 14 | Toronto | 3 | | Ottawa | Lansdowne Park | 7,000 | |
| 1913 | | McGill | No specific deciding game. Champion had most wins of the regular season. | | | | | | | |
| 1914 | Nov. 21 | Toronto | 17 | McGill | 13 | | Toronto | Varsity Stadium | 8,000 | |
From 1915 to 1918, the trophy was not presented due to World War I.
| 1919 | | McGill | No specific deciding game. Champion had most wins of the regular season. | | | | | | | |
| 1920 | Nov. 20 | Toronto | 14 | McGill | 6 | | Kingston | Queen's Athletic Grounds | | |
| 1921 | | Toronto | No specific deciding game. Champion had most wins of the regular season. | | | | | | | |
| 1922 | Nov. 18 | Queen's | 12 | Toronto | 6 | | Montreal | Molson Stadium | 10,294 | |
| 1923 | | Queen's | No specific deciding game. Champion had most wins of the regular season. | | | | | | | |
| 1924 | | Queen's | No specific deciding game. Champion had most wins of the regular season. | | | | | | | |
| 1925 | | Queen's | No specific deciding game. Champion had most wins of the regular season. | | | | | | | |
| 1926 | Nov. 27 | Toronto | 8 | Queen's | 0 | | Toronto | Varsity Stadium | 17,734 | |
| 1927 | | Queen's | No specific deciding game. Champion had most wins of the regular season. | | | | | | | |
| 1928 | | McGill | No specific deciding game. Champion had most wins of the regular season. | | | | | | | |
| 1929 | Nov. 16 | Queen's | 15 | Toronto | 5 | | Kingston | Richardson Memorial Stadium | | |
| 1930 | | Queen's | No specific deciding game. Champion had most wins of the regular season. | | | | | | | |
| 1931 | | Western | No specific deciding game. Champion had most wins of the regular season. | | | | | | | |
| 1932 | | Toronto | No specific deciding game. Champion had most wins of the regular season. | | | | | | | |
| 1933 | Nov. 18 | Toronto | 10 | Queen's | 3 | | Toronto | Varsity Stadium | 5,821 | |
| 1934 | Nov. 17 | Queen's | 8 | Toronto | 7 | | Toronto | Varsity Stadium | 12,087 | |
| 1935 | Nov. 16 | Queen's | 6 | Toronto | 4 | | Toronto | Varsity Stadium | 14,732 | |
| 1936 | Nov. 21 | Toronto | 11 | Queen's | 3 | | Toronto | Varsity Stadium | 16,685 | |
| 1937 | Nov. 27 | Queen's | 7 | Toronto | 6 | OT | Toronto | Varsity Stadium | 10,826 | |
| 1938 | Nov. 19 | McGill | 9 | Western | 0 | | Montreal | Molson Stadium | 13,000 | |
| 1939 | | Western | No specific deciding game. Champion had most wins of the regular season. | | | | | | | |
From 1940 to 1945, the trophy was not presented due to World War II.
| 1946 | | Western | No specific deciding game. Champion had most wins of the regular season. | | | | | | | |
| 1947 | | Western | No specific deciding game. Champion had most wins of the regular season. | | | | | | | |
| 1948 | Nov. 20 | Toronto | 18 | Western | 7 | | Toronto | Varsity Stadium | 19,773 | |
| 1949 | Nov. 19 | Western | 12 | McGill | 9 | | Toronto | Varsity Stadium | 17,534 | |
| 1950 | Nov. 18 | Western | 24 | McGill | 2 | | Montreal | Molson Stadium | 23,000 | |
| 1951 | | Toronto | No specific deciding game. Champion had most wins of the regular season. | | | | | | | |
| 1952 | | Western | No specific deciding game. Champion had most wins of the regular season. | | | | | | | |
| 1953 | Nov. 21 | Western | 12 | Toronto | 8 | | Toronto | Varsity Stadium | 12,530 | |
| 1954 | Nov. 27 | Toronto | 9 | Western | 8 | | London | J.W. Little Stadium | n/a | |
| 1955 | Nov. 12 | Queen's | 18 | Toronto | 0 | | Kingston | Richardson Stadium | 10,500 | |
| 1956 | Nov. 17 | Queen's | 4 | Toronto | 2 | | Kingston | Richardson Stadium | 10,000 | |
| 1957 | | Western | No specific deciding game. Champion had most wins of the regular season. | | | | | | | |
| 1958 | | Toronto | No specific deciding game. Champion had most wins of the regular season. | | | | | | | |
| 1959 | | Western | No specific deciding game. Champion had most wins of the regular season. | | | | | | | |
| 1960 | Nov. 12 | McGill | 21 | Queen's | 0 | | Kingston | Richardson Stadium | n/a | |
| 1961 | Nov. 18 | Queen's | 11 | McGill | 0 | | Kingston | Richardson Stadium | 6,580 | |
| 1962 | Nov. 17 | McGill | 15 | Queen's | 13 | | Kingston | Richardson Stadium | 4,290 | |
| 1963 | | Queen's | | | | | | | | |
| 1964 | Nov. 14 | Queen's | 63 | McMaster | 6 | | Kingston | Richardson Stadium | 4,500 | |
| 1965 | Nov. 13 | Toronto | 21 | Western | 16 | | London | J.W. Little Stadium | 5,721 | |
| 1966 | Nov. 12 | Queen's | 50 | Toronto | 7 | | Kingston | Richardson Stadium | 7,579 | |
| 1967 | | Toronto | No specific deciding game. Champion had most wins of the regular season. | | | | | | | |
| 1968 | | Queen's | No specific deciding game. Champion had most wins of the regular season. | | | | | | | |
| 1969 | | McGill | No specific deciding game. Champion had most wins of the regular season. | | | | | | | |
| 1970 | | Queen's | No specific deciding game. Champion had most wins of the regular season. | | | | | | | |
| 1971 | Nov. 6 | Western | 13 | Ottawa | 0 | | London | J.W. Little Stadium | 4,000 | |
| 1972 | Nov. 11 | Lutheran | 38 | Western | 27 | | Waterloo | Seagram Stadium | 3,500 | |
| 1973 | Nov. 10 | Laurier | 48 | Ottawa | 4 | | Waterloo | Centennial Stadium | 2,500 | |
| 1974 | Nov. 9 | Western | 19 | Laurier | 8 | | Waterloo | Centennial Stadium | 3,500 | W |
| 1974 | Nov. 9 | Toronto | 24 | Ottawa | 21 | | Toronto | Varsity Stadium | 5,000 | E |
| 1975 | Nov. 8 | Windsor | 65 | Laurier | 8 | | Windsor | South Campus Field | 2,700 | W |
| 1975 | Nov. 8 | Ottawa | 14 | Toronto | 7 | | Ottawa | Lansdowne Park | n/a | E |
| 1976 | Nov. 6 | Western | 28 | Laurier | 14 | | London | J.W. Little Stadium | 8,000 | W |
| 1976 | Nov. 6 | Ottawa | 22 | Bishop's | 20 | | Ottawa | Mooney's Bay Stadium | n/a | E |
| 1977 | Nov. 5 | Western | 22 | Laurier | 17 | | London | J.W. Little Stadium | 7,000 | W |
| 1977 | Nov. 5 | Queen's | 45 | Bishop's | 27 | | Kingston | Richardson Stadium | 5,000 | E |
| 1978 | Nov. 4 | Laurier | 19 | Western | 14 | | London | J.W. Little Stadium | 8,000 | W |
| 1978 | Nov. 4 | Queen's | 23 | McGill | 1 | | Kingston | Richardson Stadium | 7,000 | E |
| 1979 | Nov. 10 | Western | 32 | Queen's | 14 | | London | J.W. Little Stadium | 9,500 | |
| 1980 | Nov. 8 | Western | 51 | Laurier | 28 | | London | J.W. Little Stadium | 8,000 | |
| 1981 | Nov. 14 | Western | 17 | Guelph | 7 | | London | J.W. Little Stadium | 8,000 | |
| 1982 | Nov. 6 | Western | 50 | Toronto | 21 | | London | J.W. Little Stadium | 5,500 | |
| 1983 | Nov. 5 | Toronto | 20 | McMaster | 16 | | Toronto | Varsity Stadium | 6,000 | |
| 1984 | Nov. 10 | Guelph | 31 | Western | 26 | | London | J.W. Little Stadium | 7,500 | |
| 1985 | Nov. 16 | Western | 19 | Laurier | 16 | | London | J.W. Little Stadium | 3,200 | |
| 1986 | Nov. 8 | Western | 49 | Guelph | 21 | | London | J.W. Little Stadium | 6,000 | |
| 1987 | Nov. 7 | Laurier | 28 | Guelph | 15 | | Waterloo | Seagram Stadium | n/a | |
| 1988 | Nov. 5 | Western | 27 | Laurier | 16 | | London | J.W. Little Stadium | 5,000 | |
| 1989 | Nov. 4 | Western | 50 | Toronto | 20 | | London | J.W. Little Stadium | 6,000 | |
| 1990 | Nov. 10 | Western | 46 | Toronto | 31 | | London | J.W. Little Stadium | 7,000 | |
| 1991 | Nov. 9 | Laurier | 13 | Western | 12 | | London | J.W. Little Stadium | 7,500 | |
| 1992 | Nov. 7 | Guelph | 45 | Western | 10 | | Toronto | SkyDome | 6,245 | |
| 1993 | Nov. 6 | Toronto | 24 | Western | 16 | | London | J.W. Little Stadium | 7,100 | |
| 1994 | Nov. 5 | Western | 38 | Laurier | 36 | OT | Waterloo | Seagram Stadium | 6,056 | |
| 1995 | Nov. 11 | Western | 10 | Laurier | 9 | | Waterloo | University Stadium | 4,000 | |
| 1996 | Nov. 9 | Guelph | 23 | Waterloo | 13 | | Waterloo | University Stadium | n/a | |
| 1997 | Nov. 8 | Waterloo | 30 | Western | 10 | | London | J.W. Little Stadium | 4,500 | |
| 1998 | Nov. 14 | Western | 47 | Waterloo | 41 | | London | J.W. Little Stadium | 5,532 | |
| 1999 | Nov. 13 | Waterloo | 32 | Laurier | 20 | | Waterloo | University Stadium | 6,500 | |
| 2000 | Nov. 11 | McMaster | 48 | Laurier | 23 | | Hamilton | Les Prince Field | 5,000 | |
| 2001 | Nov. 10 | McMaster | 30 | Ottawa | 22 | | Hamilton | Les Prince Field | 5,922 | |
| 2002 | Nov. 9 | McMaster | 33 | Queen's | 19 | | Hamilton | Les Prince Field | 7,000 | |
| 2003 | Nov. 8 | McMaster | 41 | Laurier | 17 | | Hamilton | Ivor Wynne Stadium | 12,464 | |
| 2004 | Nov. 13 | Laurier | 31 | McMaster | 19 | | Waterloo | University Stadium | 8,175 | |
| 2005 | Nov. 12 | Laurier | 29 | Western | 11 | | Waterloo | University Stadium | 5,915 | |
| 2006 | Nov. 11 | Ottawa | 32 | Laurier | 14 | | Ottawa | Frank Clair Stadium | 4,159 | |
| 2007 | Nov. 10 | Western | 34 | Guelph | 21 | | Guelph | Alumni Stadium | 8,500 | |
| 2008 | Nov. 8 | Western | 31 | Ottawa | 17 | | London | TD Waterhouse | 5,480 | |
| 2009 | Nov. 14 | Queen's | 43 | Western | 39 | | Kingston | Richardson Stadium | 7,253 | |
| 2010 | Nov. 13 | Western | 26 | Ottawa | 25 | | Ottawa | Frank Clair Stadium | 7,194 | |
| 2011 | Nov. 12 | McMaster | 41 | Western | 19 | | London | TD Waterhouse | | |
| 2012 | Nov. 10 | McMaster | 30 | Guelph | 13 | | Hamilton | Ron Joyce Stadium | 5,400 | |
| 2013 | Nov. 9 | Western | 51 | Queen's | 22 | | London | TD Waterhouse | 5,805 | |
| 2014 | Nov. 15 | McMaster | 20 | Guelph | 15 | | Hamilton | Ron Joyce Stadium | 4,554 | |
| 2015 | Nov. 14 | Guelph | 23 | Western | 17 | | London | TD Stadium | 5,817 | |
| 2016 | Nov. 12 | Laurier | 43 | Western | 40 | | London | TD Stadium | 4,134 | |
| 2017 | Nov. 11 | Western | 75 | Laurier | 32 | | London | TD Stadium | 4,200 | |
| 2018 | Nov. 10 | Western | 63 | Guelph | 14 | | London | TD Stadium | 4,339 | |
| 2019 | Nov. 9 | McMaster | 29 | Western | 15 | | London | TD Stadium | 5,000 | |
2020 game cancelled due to coronavirus pandemic.
| 2021 | Nov. 20 | Western | 29 | Queen's | 0 | | Kingston | Richardson Stadium | 5,300 | |
| 2022 | Nov. 12 | Western | 44 | Queen's | 16 | | London | Western Alumni Stadium | 2,739 | |
| 2023 | Nov. 11 | Western | 29 | Laurier | 14 | | London | Western Alumni Stadium | 4,625 | |
| 2024 | Nov. 8 | Laurier | 51 | Western | 31 | | Waterloo | University Stadium | 5,000 | |
| 2025 | Nov. 8 | Queen's | 30 | Laurier | 27 | | Waterloo | University Stadium | 4,500 | |
| 2026 | Nov. 14 | Western | 36 | Queen's | 27 | | Kingston | Richardson Stadium | 6,212 | |

== Championship titles ==
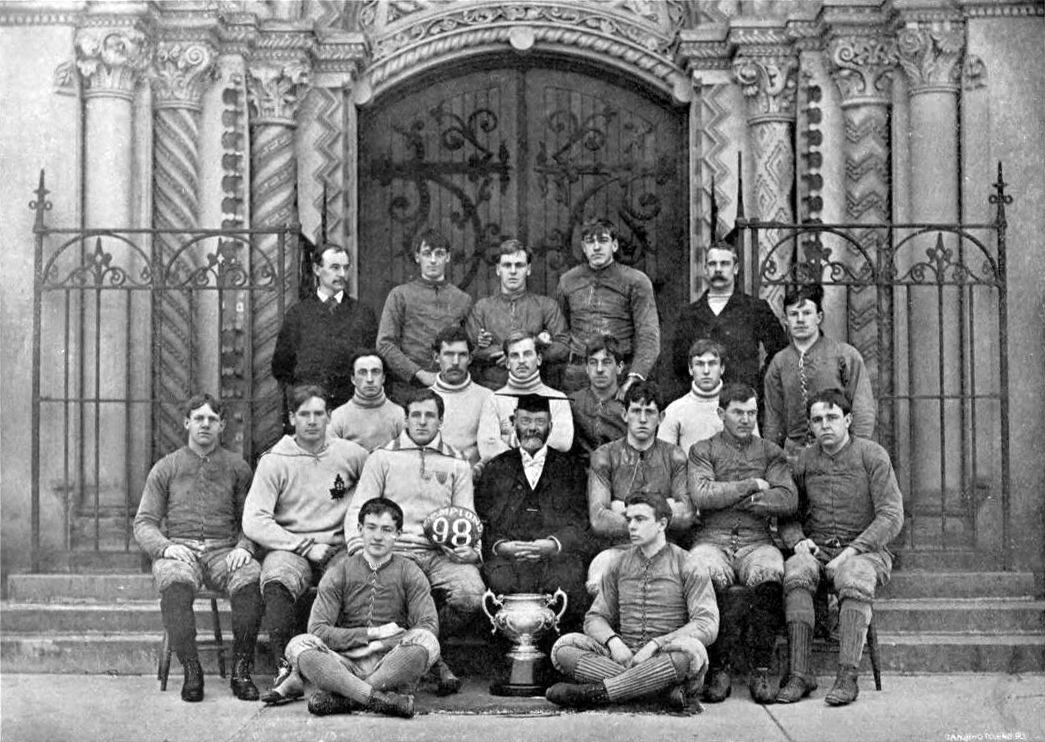
The 1898 championship team from the University of Toronto for the inaugural year in the Canadian University rugby football league.

| Team | Wins |
|---|---|
| Western Mustangs | 36 |
| Toronto Varsity Blues | 25 |
| Queen's Gaels | 24 |
| McGill Redbirds* | 10 |
| Wilfrid Laurier Golden Hawks | 9 |
| McMaster Marauders | 8 |
| Ottawa Gee-Gees | 4 |
| Guelph Gryphons | 4 |
| Waterloo Warriors | 2 |
| Windsor Lancers | 1 |
| York Lions | 0 |
| Carleton Ravens | 0 |

Note*: McGill entered the Quebec Conference in 1971 and stopped competing for the Yates Cup. Instead, the conference championship ended in the Dunsmore Cup.
