= Dunsmore Cup =

Canadian football trophy

- Awarded for: RSEQ champion in U Sports football
- First awarded: 1980
- Presented by: Réseau du sport étudiant du Québec
- Current champions: Laval Rouge et Or
- Most titles: Laval Rouge et Or (17)
- Website: www.sportetudiant-stats.com/universitaire/football/dunsmore.php

The Dunsmore Cup (French: Coupe Dunsmore) is a Canadian sports trophy which was presented annually to the winner of the university-level football competition conducted by Réseau du sport étudiant du Québec (RSEQ) between 1980 and 2005. (Note: The RSEQ university football conference, one of four within U Sports, was known as the Quebec University Football League before the 2011 season.)

The Cup was first awarded in 1980 to the winner of the Ontario-Quebec Interuniversity Football Conference and, upon re-organization into the Quebec Intercollegiate Football Conference (later the Quebec University Football League and now part of RSEQ), continued to be awarded as the Quebec conference's championship.

The winner of the Dunsmore Cup goes on to play in either the Uteck Bowl or the Mitchell Bowl national semi-final, depending on annual rotations.

The Dunsmore Cup was donated by Bob Dunsmore of Queen's University, a 1915 Engineering graduate.

As of the 2025 season, the RSEQ championship is for the new Jacques Dussault Cup.

== Winners ==
Date	Winning team	Score	Losing team	Score	Location
8 November 1980	Ottawa	13	Queen's	12	Ottawa, ON
14 November 1981	Queen's	26	McGill	19	Montréal, QC
6 November 1982	Concordia	25	Queen's	15	Montréal, QC
5 November 1983	Queen's	36	McGill	5	Kingston, ON
10 November 1984	Queen's	37	Bishop's	35	Lennoxville, QC
16 November 1985	Carleton	46	Concordia	21	Ottawa, ON
8 November 1986	Bishop's	38	Carleton	19	Lennoxville, QC
7 November 1987	McGill	32	Bishop's	16	Lennoxville, QC
5 November 1988	Bishop's	16	Queen's	7	Lennoxville, QC
4 November 1989	Queen's	39	Ottawa	18	Kingston, ON
10 November 1990	Bishop's	20	Queen's	9	Lennoxville, QC
9 November 1991	Queen's	34	Bishop's	31	Lennoxville, QC
7 November 1992	Queen's	32	Bishop's	6	Lennoxville, QC
6 November 1993	Concordia	10	Bishop's	7	Lennoxville, QC
5 November 1994	Bishop's	14	McGill	7	Montréal, QC
11 November 1995	Ottawa	8	Queen's	3	Ottawa, ON
9 November 1996	Ottawa	20	McGill	11	Ottawa, ON
8 November 1997*	Queen's	7	Ottawa	24	Kingston, ON
15 November 1998	Concordia	17	Laval	12	Montréal, QC
13 November 1999	Laval	38	Ottawa	6	Ste. Foy, QC
11 November 2000	Ottawa	26	Laval	9	Ste. Foy, QC
10 November 2001*	McGill	14	Laval	42	Québec, QC
9 November 2002	McGill	10	Concordia	6	Montréal, QC
9 November 2003	Laval	59	Concordia	7	Québec, QC
13 November 2004	Laval	30	Montréal	12	Montréal, QC
24 November 2005	Laval	19	Montréal	13	Québec, QC
11 November 2006	Laval	28	Concordia	12	Québec, QC
10 November 2007	Laval	35	Concordia	10	Québec, QC
9 November 2008	Laval	28	Concordia	17	Québec, QC
14 November 2009	Laval	31	Montréal	7	Québec, QC
13 November 2010	Laval	22	Sherbrooke	17	Québec, QC
12 November 2011	Laval	30	Montréal	7	Québec, QC
10 November 2012	Laval	40	Sherbrooke	17	Québec, QC
9 November 2013	Laval	14	Montréal	11	Québec, QC
15 November 2014	Montréal	12	Laval	9	Québec, QC
14 November 2015	Montréal	18	Laval	16	Québec, QC
12 November 2016	Laval	20	Montréal	17	Montréal, QC
11 November 2017	Laval	25	Montréal	22	Québec, QC
10 November 2018	Laval	14	Montréal	1	Québec, QC
9 November 2019	Montréal	25	Laval	10	Québec, QC
Season cancelled due to COVID-19 pandemic
14 November 2021	Montréal	28	Laval	19	Montréal, QC
12 November 2022	Laval	25	Montréal	24	Québec, QC
11 November 2023	Montréal	12	Laval	6	Montréal, QC
9 November 2024	Laval	22	Montréal	17	Quebec City

- (*) Ottawa and Laval were later forced to forfeit all post season titles for use of ineligible players during the season.

== Records ==
Team	GP	W	L	Win %
Laval Rouge et Or	25	17	8	.680
Queen's Golden Gaels (Note: Since 2001, Queen's and Ottawa have played in the Ontario University Athletics conference and no longer compete for the Dunsmore Cup.)	12	7	5	.583
Montreal Carabins	15	5	10	.333
Bishop's Gaiters (Note: Bishop's moved to the Atlantic University Sport conference for the 2017 U Sports football season and no longer competes for the Dunsmore Cup.)	9	4	5	.444
Ottawa Gee-Gees	7	4	3	.571
Concordia Stingers	9	3	6	.333
McGill Redbirds	7	3	4	.429
Carleton Ravens (Note: Carleton re-established their football program in 2013, after a 15-year absence, they now compete in the Ontario University Athletics conference and no longer compete for the Dunsmore Cup.)	2	1	1	.500
Sherbrooke Vert et Or	2	0	2	.000
