= Mitchell Bowl =

Canadian collegiate football semifinal game

- Sport: Canadian football
- League: U Sports football
- Awarded for: Winning the U Sports Semifinal Championship
- Country: Canada

History
- First award: 2002
- Editions: 22
- First winner: Saskatchewan Huskies
- Most wins: Laval Rouge et Or (5); Saskatchewan Huskies (5)
- Most recent: Western Mustangs (2026)
- Website: usports.ca/en/championships/mitchell-bowl/m

The Mitchell Bowl is one of the two semifinal bowls of U Sports football, Canada's national competition for university teams that play Canadian football. It is held in the more westerly location of the two semifinal venues. The winner of this game goes on to play against the Uteck Bowl champions for the Vanier Cup. The home of the Mitchell Bowl, as well as the two conference champions, changes each year on a rotating basis. The Mitchell Bowl was named after Douglas H. Mitchell, a former Canadian Football League commissioner and member of the National Hockey League board of governors.

== History ==
In 2001, U Sports, then known as CIS, voted to change the permanent site of the Atlantic Bowl in the interest of competitive fairness. In 2002, the Mitchell Bowl was first awarded, replacing the Atlantic Bowl. During 2002, the Mitchell Bowl played opposite to the Churchill Bowl. In 2003, the Uteck Bowl replaced the Churchill Bowl.

The 2020 game was cancelled due to the COVID-19 pandemic.

== List of Mitchell Bowl champions ==
Date	Champion	Score	Runner up	Location	MVP Winner
November 16, 2002	Saskatchewan	22–0	McGill	Percival-Molson Stadium, Montreal	Sheldon Ball, Saskatchewan
November 15, 2003	Laval	36–32	McMaster	Ivor Wynne Stadium, Hamilton	Jeronimo Huerta-Flores, Laval
November 20, 2004	Saskatchewan	31–16	Saint Mary's	Griffiths Stadium, Saskatoon	Steve Bilan, Saskatchewan
November 19, 2005	Saskatchewan	29–27	Laval	Griffiths Stadium, Saskatoon	David Stevens, Saskatchewan
November 18, 2006	Saskatchewan	35–28	Ottawa	Frank Clair Stadium, Ottawa	Tyler O’Gorman, Saskatchewan
November 17, 2007	Manitoba	52–20	Western	Canad Inns Stadium, Winnipeg	Mike Howard, Manitoba
November 16, 2008	Western	28–12	Saint Mary's	TD Waterhouse Stadium, London	Craig Butler, Western
November 21, 2009	Queen's	33–30	Laval	Richardson Memorial Stadium, Kingston	Shomari Williams, Queen's
November 20, 2010	Calgary	35–8	Saint Mary's	McMahon Stadium, Calgary	Steven Lumbala, Calgary
November 18, 2011	Laval	41–10	Calgary	McMahon Stadium, Calgary	Sébastien Lévesque, Laval
November 17, 2012	McMaster	45–6	Calgary	Ron Joyce Stadium, Hamilton	Kyle Quinlan, McMaster
November 16, 2013	Calgary	44–3	Western	McMahon Stadium, Calgary	Mercer Timmis, Calgary
November 22, 2014	McMaster	24–12	Mount Allison	Ron Joyce Stadium, Hamilton	Mark Mackie, McMaster
November 21, 2015	Montreal	25–10	Guelph	Alumni Stadium, Guelph	Junior Luke, Montreal
November 19, 2016	Calgary	50–24	St. Francis Xavier	McMahon Stadium, Calgary	Jimmy Underdahl, Calgary
November 18, 2017	Laval	35–23	Calgary	McMahon Stadium, Calgary	Hugo Richard, Laval
November 17, 2018	Western	47–24	Saskatchewan	TD Stadium, London	Chris Merchant, Western
November 16, 2019	Calgary	30–17	McMaster	McMahon Stadium, Calgary	Jalen Philpot, Calgary
November 21, 2020	Cancelled due to the COVID-19 pandemic				
November 27, 2021	Western	61–6	St. Francis Xavier	Western Alumni Stadium, London	Offence: Elliot Beamer, Western; Defence: Daniel Valente Jr., Western
November 19, 2022	Laval	27–20	Western	Western Alumni Stadium, London	Offence: Kalenga Muganda, Laval; Defence: Alec Poirier, Laval
November 18, 2023	UBC	47–17	St. Francis Xavier	Thunderbird Stadium, Vancouver	Offence: Garrett Rooker, UBC; Defence: Jaxon Ciraolo-Brown, UBC
November 16, 2024	Laval	17–14	Regina	Mosaic Stadium, Regina	Offence: Olivier Cool, Laval; Defence: Jordan Lessard, Laval
November 15, 2025	Saskatchewan	22–11	Queen's	Griffiths Stadium, Saskatoon	Offence: Daniel Kubongo, Saskatchewan; Defence: Seth Hundeby, Saskatchewan
November 21, 2026	Western	64–14	St. Mary's	Western Alumni Stadium, London	Offence: Ben Casselman, Western; Defence: Nathan Summers, Western

== Future participants ==
The teams and host sites of the Mitchell Bowl and the Uteck Bowl rotate on a six-year cycle, so that in each cycle each of the four conferences hosts and visits every other conference once. With the 2020 game cancelled, the cycle was delayed by one year with the 2020 teams playing in 2021.

Future participants are:

Date	Visiting conference	Host conference
November 20, 2027	RSEQ	OUA
November 18, 2028	RSEQ	Canada West

All Mitchell Bowl games have been played at the home field of the host conference's champion. As of 2026, home teams have a record of 16–9.

== Team win–loss records ==
Team	W	L	Win %
Laval Rouge et Or	5	2	.714
Saskatchewan Huskies	5	1	.833
Calgary Dinos	4	3	.571
Western Mustangs	4	3	.571
McMaster Marauders	2	2	.500
Manitoba Bisons	1	0	1.000
Montreal Carabins	1	0	1.000
UBC Thunderbirds	1	0	1.000
Queen's Gaels	1	1	0.500
St. Francis Xavier X-Men	0	3	.000
Saint Mary's Huskies	0	4	.000
Guelph Gryphons	0	1	.000
McGill Redbirds	0	1	.000
Mount Allison Mounties	0	1	.000
Ottawa Gee-Gees	0	1	.000
Regina Rams	0	1	.000
