= Uteck Bowl =

Canadian collegiate football semifinal game

- Sport: Canadian football
- League: U Sports football
- Awarded for: Winning the U Sports Semifinal Championship
- Country: Canada

History
- First award: 2003
- Editions: 22
- First winner: Saint Mary's Huskies
- Most wins: Laval Rouge et Or (8)
- Most recent: Montreal (2026)

The Uteck Bowl is one of the two semifinal bowls of U Sports football, Canada's national competition for university teams that play Canadian football. It is held in the easternmost of the two semifinal venues. The Uteck Bowl champion moves on to face the Mitchell Bowl champion for the Vanier Cup. It was named for Larry Uteck, a former professional football player and university coach who died of amyotrophic lateral sclerosis (ALS) in 2002.

== History ==
The Atlantic Bowl traditionally saw the Atlantic University Sport champions face a champion from another conference at Huskies Stadium in Halifax. However, in the interests of competitive fairness, the Atlantic Bowl was replaced by the Mitchell Bowl, its venue, like the Churchill Bowl that had paralleled it for so long, rotating among two of the conference champions.

Larry Uteck was a longtime football coach at Saint Mary's University and, at the time, the university's athletic director. It was decided that the Churchill Bowl would be retired, the Mitchell Bowl would take the place of the Churchill Bowl, and a new championship would be named in Uteck's memory. Thus, the Uteck Bowl formally replaced the Atlantic Bowl.

The inaugural Uteck Bowl was played at Huskies Stadium, where two-time defending Vanier Cup champions and home team Saint Mary's Huskies defeated the Simon Fraser Clan.

The 2020 game was cancelled due to the COVID-19 pandemic.

== Uteck Bowl champions ==
Date	Champion	Score	Runner up	Location	Uteck Bowl MVP
November 15, 2003	Saint Mary's	60–9	Simon Fraser	Huskies Stadium, Halifax	Les Mullings, Saint Mary's
November 20, 2004	Laval	30–11	Laurier	PEPS Stadium, Quebec City	Jeronimo Huerta-Flores, Laval
November 19, 2005	Laurier	31–10	Acadia	Huskies Stadium, Halifax	Ryan Pyear, Laurier
November 18, 2006	Laval	57–10	Acadia	PEPS Stadium, Quebec City	Olivier Turcotte-Létourneau, Laval
November 17, 2007	Saint Mary's	24–2	Laval	Huskies Stadium, Halifax	Tim St. Pierre, Saint Mary's
November 16, 2008	Laval	59–10	Calgary	PEPS Stadium, Quebec City	Benoit Groulx, Laval
November 21, 2009	Calgary	38–14	Saint Mary's	Huskies Stadium, Halifax	Matt Walter, Calgary
November 20, 2010	Laval	13–11	Western	PEPS Stadium, Quebec City	Christopher Milo, Laval
November 18, 2011	McMaster	45–21	Acadia	Moncton Stadium, Moncton	Kyle Quinlan, McMaster
November 17, 2012	Laval	42–7	Acadia	PEPS Stadium, Quebec City	Maxime Boutin, Laval
November 16, 2013	Laval	48–21	Mount Allison	MacAulay Field, Sackville	Guillaume Rioux, Laval
November 22, 2014	Montreal	29–26	Manitoba	CEPSUM Stadium, Montreal	Gabriel Cousineau, Montreal
November 21, 2015	UBC	36–9	St. Francis Xavier	Oland Stadium, Antigonish	Brandon Deschamps, UBC
November 19, 2016	Laval	36–6	Laurier	Telus Stadium, Quebec City	Félix Faubert-Lussier, Laval
November 18, 2017	Western	81–3	Acadia	Raymond Field, Wolfville	Chris Merchant, Western
November 17, 2018	Laval	63–0	St. Francis Xavier	Telus Stadium, Quebec City	Hugo Richard, Laval
November 16, 2019	Montreal	38–0	Acadia	Raymond Field, Wolfville	Reda Malki, Montreal
November 21, 2020	Cancelled due to the COVID-19 pandemic				
November 27, 2021	Saskatchewan	14–10	Montreal	CEPSUM Stadium, Montreal	Offence: Adam Machart, Saskatchewan; Defence: Riley Pickett, Saskatchewan
November 19, 2022	Saskatchewan	36–19	St. Francis Xavier	Oland Stadium, Antigonish	Offence: Mason Nyhus, Saskatchewan; Defence: John Stoll, Saskatchewan
November 18, 2023	Montreal	29–3	Western	CEPSUM Stadium, Montreal	Offence: Jonathan Sénécal, Montreal; Defence: Nicolas Roy, Montreal
November 16, 2024	Laurier	48–24	Bishop's	Coulter Field, Lennoxville	
November 15, 2025	Montreal	49–19	Saint Mary's	Huskies Stadium, Halifax	Offence: Mathieu Barsalou, Montreal; Defence: Mathis Bérubé, Montreal
November 21, 2026	Montreal	30–13	UBC	CEPSUM Stadium, Montreal	Offence: Merton Théagène, Montreal; Defence: Benjamin McDougall, Montreal

== Future participants ==
The teams and host sites of the Uteck Bowl and the Mitchell Bowl rotate on a six-year cycle, so that in each cycle each of the four conferences hosts and visits every other conference once. With the 2020 game cancelled, the cycle was delayed by one year with the 2020 teams playing in 2021.

Future participants are:

Date	Visiting conference	Host conference
November 20, 2027	Canada West	AUS
November 18, 2028	OUA	AUS

To date, the Uteck Bowl games hosted by Quebec have been played at the champion's home field, while the first four games hosted by Atlantic University Sport (AUS) were played at Huskies Stadium in Halifax. The 2011 game was held in Moncton at the newly built Moncton Stadium. All subsequent games were hosted by the Loney Bowl champion. As of 2026, home teams have a record of 12–9.

== Team win–loss records ==
Team	W	L	Win %
Laval Rouge et Or	8	1	.889
Montreal Carabins	5	1	.833
Saskatchewan Huskies	2	0	1.000
Saint Mary's Huskies	2	2	.500
Wilfrid Laurier Golden Hawks	2	2	.500
Western Mustangs	1	2	.333
Calgary Dinos	1	1	.500
McMaster Marauders	1	0	1.000
UBC Thunderbirds	1	1	0.500
Acadia Axemen	0	6	.000
St. Francis Xavier X-Men	0	3	.000
Manitoba Bisons	0	1	.000
Mount Allison Mounties	0	1	.000
Simon Fraser Clan	0	1	.000
Bishop's Gaiters	0	1	.000
