= Chris Bertoia =

Canadian gridiron football coach

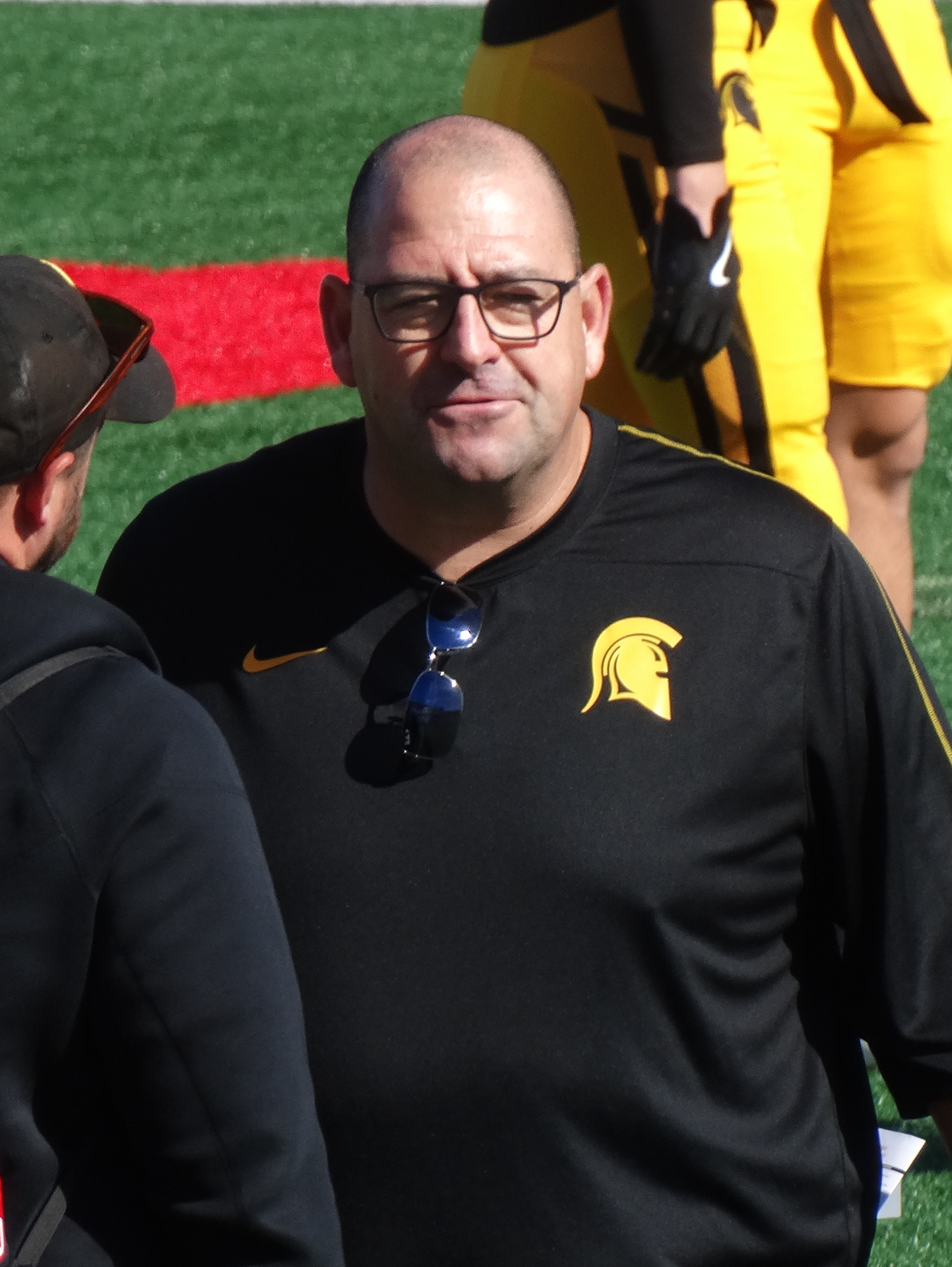
- Bertoia with the Waterloo Warriors in 2024

Waterloo Warriors
- Title: Head coach

Personal information
- Born: London, Ontario, Canada

Career information
- University: Waterloo

Career history
- 2005–2008: St. Francis Xavier X-Men (Offensive line coach, Defensive line coach)
- 2009–2014: Western Mustangs (Offensive line coach)
- 2015–present: Waterloo Warriors (Head coach)

Awards and highlights
- OUA Coach of the Year (2017)

Chris Bertoia is the head coach and manager of football operations for the University of Waterloo's football team, the Waterloo Warriors, a position he has held since the 2015 U Sports season.

== University career ==
Bertoia played CIAU football for the Warriors as part of the only two Yates Cup winning teams in school history in 1997 and 1999.

== Coaching career ==
=== Early coaching career ===
Following graduation, Bertoia was the offensive line coach for Catholic Central High School in London, Ontario from 2000 to 2003 while holding the same role from 2002 to 2004 with the London Beefeaters of the Canadian Junior Football League. He then moved to the Maritimes for his first collegiate coaching position with the St. Francis Xavier X-Men in 2005 where he served as the offensive and defensive line coach, recruiting coordinator and strength and conditioning coach over his four-year tenure there. He later on moved back to his hometown of London in 2009 to become the offensive line coach and recruitment coordinator for the Western Mustangs. He was with the Mustangs program through to the 2014 season.

=== Waterloo Warriors ===
On December 18, 2014, Bertoia was named head coach of the Waterloo Warriors football team. After the team endured winless seasons in his first two years, he recruited Tre Ford and Tyrell Ford to the team, who were able to help the lead the team to a 4–4 record in 2017. Bertoia was then named OUA coach of the year in 2017.

In 2018, Bertoia led the Warriors to another 4–4 record, but the team also qualified for the playoffs for the first time since 2003. In the following year, the Warriors again finished 4–4 and Bertoia won his first playoff game in the quarterfinal victory over the Ottawa Gee-Gees which was also the first post-season win for the Warriors since 1999 when Bertoia was a player with the team. He did not coach in 2020 due to the cancellation of the 2020 season.

In a shortened 2021 season, Bertoia led the Warriors to a 3–3 record, but the team was defeated by the Western Mustangs in the playoffs for the second straight year. In 2022, the Warriors finished in 10th place in the OUA with a 1–7 record and Bertoia missed the playoffs for the first time since 2017. In 2023, he led the team back to the playoffs, but the Warriors were soundly defeated by the Wilfrid Laurier Golden Hawks.

== Personal life ==
Bertoia currently resides in Woodstock, Ontario with his wife, Tracie, and their children, Johnathan and Emma.

== Head coaching record ==
| Year | Overall | Conference | Standing | Bowl/playoffs |
|---|---|---|---|---|
Waterloo Warriors (OUA) (2015–present)
| 2015 | 0-8 | 0-8 | 11th | |
| 2016 | 0-8 | 0-8 | 11th | |
| 2017 | 4-4 | 4-4 | 7th | |
| 2018 | 4-5 | 4-4 | 6th | |
| 2019 | 5-5 | 4-4 | 5th | |
| 2020 | Season cancelled due to Covid-19 | | | |
| 2021 | 3-4 | 3-3 | 4th (OUA West) | |
| 2022 | 1-7 | 1-7 | 10th | |
| 2023 | 3-6 | 3-5 | 7th | |
| 2024 | 0-8 | 0-8 | 11th | |
| 2025 | 2-6 | 2-6 | 9th | |
| Waterloo: | 22-61 | 21-57 | | |
