= Steve Snyder =

Canadian gridiron football coach

Queen's Gaels
- Title: Head coach

Personal information
- Born: London, Ontario, Canada

Career information
- Position: Quarterback
- High school: H. B. Beal Secondary
- CJFL: London Beefeaters
- University: St. Francis Xavier

Career history

Playing
- 2010–2011: Osnabruck Tigers

Coaching
- 2010–2011: Osnabruck Tigers (Offensive coordinator)
- 2012: London Mustangs (Running backs coach) (Special teams coach)
- 2012–2013: Windsor Lancers (Special teams coordinator)
- 2013: Essex Ravens (Interim head coach)
- 2014–2016: St. Francis Xavier X-Men (Offensive coordinator)
- 2017–2018: Western Mustangs (Offensive coordinator)
- 2019–present: Queen's Gaels (Head coach)

Awards and highlights
- Vanier Cup champion (2017); Coach of the Year (2021)

Steve Snyder is the head coach for Queen's University's football team, the Queen's Gaels. He was named U Sports football Coach of the Year in 2021 and won a Vanier Cup in 2017 with the Western Mustangs as the team's offensive coordinator.

== Amateur career ==
Snyder played at quarterback with the London Beefeaters of the Canadian Junior Football League for Joe D'Amore in 2004. He then enrolled at St. Francis Xavier University and played for the X-Men from 2007 to 2009. He completed 347 of 636 pass attempts for 5,151 yards over the course of his three-year career with the X-Men.

== Coaching career ==
=== Early career ===
Following his university career, Snyder signed a contract to play for the Osnabruck Tigers of the American football Regionalliga in 2010 and also coached for their U18 team. After two years with the Tigers, he returned to London to serve as the running backs coach and special teams coach for the London Jr. Mustangs of the Ontario Varsity Football League (OVFL).

=== Windsor Lancers ===
Snyder earned his first opportunity to coach in U Sports when he was hired by Windsor Lancers head coach, Joe D'Amore, to serve as the team's special teams coordinator and recruiting coordinator for the 2012 season. He also served as the interim head coach for the Essex Ravens of the OVFL in 2013.

=== St. Francis Xavier X-Men ===
On December 12, 2013, Snyder was named the offensive coordinator for the St. Francis Xavier X-Men. After missing the playoffs in 2013, the X-Men made the playoffs in each of the three seasons that Snyder was with the team and also won Loney Bowl championships in 2015 and 2016.

=== Western Mustangs ===
Snyder was named the offensive coordinator for the Western Mustangs on December 21, 2016. In his first year with the team in 2017, the Mustangs won the 53rd Vanier Cup over the Laval Rouge et Or, which was Snyder's first national championship and Western's first since 1994. In 2018, the Mustangs again qualified for the Vanier Cup, but were defeated in the 54th Vanier Cup in the rematch against the Rouge et Or.

=== Queen's Gaels ===
On December 19, 2018, Snyder was named the head coach for the Queen's Gaels. In his first season, the team finished with a 3–5 record, which was the same as the year prior. He did not coach in 2020 due to the cancellation of the 2020 season.

In 2021, Snyder led the Gaels to a perfect 6–0 record and first place in the OUA East Division. The team qualified for the Yates Cup, but were defeated by his former team, the Mustangs. Despite the loss, Snyder was awarded the Frank Tindall Trophy as U Sports football coach of the year for the team's turnaround.

In the 2022 season, Snyder again led the Gaels to a strong finish with a 7–1 record, but were again defeated by the Mustangs in the Yates Cup. In 2023, the Gaels had a fourth-place finish with a 5–3 record and lost to the Mustangs in the OUA semi-final.

== Head coaching record ==
Year	Overall	Conference	Standing	Bowl/playoffs
Queen's Gaels (OUA) (2019–present)
2019	3–5	3–5	8th	
2020	Season canceled due to COVID-19 pandemic			
2021	8–1	6–0	1st (OUA East)	L Yates
2022	9–2	7–1	2nd	L Yates
2023	6–4	5–3	4th	
2024	6–4	5–3	5th	
2025	8-4	5-3	4th	W Yates, L Mitchell
Queen's:	40–20	31–15		
Total:	40-20			
