= 2021 U Sports football season =

- Duration: August 28, 2021 – November 6, 2021
- Hardy Cup champions: Saskatchewan Huskies
- Yates Cup champions: Western Mustangs
- Dunsmore Cup champions: Montreal Carabins
- Loney Bowl champions: StFX X-Men
- Mitchell Bowl champions: Western Mustangs
- Uteck Bowl champions: Saskatchewan Huskies

Vanier Cup
- Date: December 4, 2021
- Venue: Telus Stadium; Quebec City, Quebec
- Champions: Western Mustangs

U Sports football seasons seasons
- 2020 2022

The 2021 U Sports football season began on August 28, 2021, with the Sherbrooke Vert et Or hosting the Montreal Carabins in Sherbrooke, Quebec. The Atlantic University Sport conference began play on September 17, 2021, and ten Ontario University Athletics teams opened their seasons on September 18, 2021. The Canada West conference began their regular season last with all six teams playing on September 25, 2021. Due to the COVID-19 pandemic in Canada, all conferences except the RSEQ played six regular season games while the RSEQ played eight.

The conference championships were played on the weekend of November 20 and the season concluded on December 4 with the 56th Vanier Cup championship, with the Western Mustangs defeating the Saskatchewan Huskies by a score of 27–21. 27 university teams in Canada played U Sports football this season, the highest level of amateur Canadian football.

== Schedule changes ==
The Atlantic University Sport conference was the first to announce their 2021 schedule after no conference played in 2020 due to the COVID-19 pandemic in Canada. The AUS confirmed a schedule of six regular season games instead of the usual eight with a start date three weeks later than the 2019 scheduled start with the additional one-week delay of this year's Vanier Cup game. The AUS also had four out of five teams qualify for playoffs, instead of three, with the fourth seeded team playing the top team and the second seed playing the third. The Loney Bowl was played on November 20, 2021.

The Canada West conference announced their schedule shortly after the AUS, on June 21, 2021, with all six teams playing on September 25, 2021. Canada West featured six teams playing six regular season games apiece with each team playing one game against the other plus one additional game. The first week's opponents are the same as the last week's opponents with the host switching for the last week. The 84th Hardy Cup game was played on the weekend of November 20, 2021.

On June 30, 2021, both the OUA and RSEQ released their schedules. The OUA also played on a reduced schedule with each team playing six regular season games over a seven-week regular season. Notably, some OUA teams' schedules featured repeat matchups with some teams playing opponents twice in order to reduce travel. The OUA also shifted to a two-division set up with Carleton, Ottawa, Queen's, Toronto, and York in the East Division and Guelph, McMaster, Waterloo, Western, Wilfrid Laurier, and Windsor in the West Division. The 113th Yates Cup games was played on November 20, 2021. The RSEQ is scheduled to play a standard eight-game schedule with five teams playing over the course of a ten-week regular season. Notably, the Dunsmore Cup did not endure the same delay as the other conference championships and was played on November 13, 2021.

== Regular season ==
=== Standings ===
2021 AUS standings
Team	W		L	PF		PA	Pts	Ply
#6 St. FX	6	–	0	193	–	99	12	†
Mount Allison	5	–	1	94	–	61	10	X
Bishop's	2	–	4	88	–	135	4	X
Acadia	1	–	5	52	–	59	2	X
Saint Mary's	1	–	5	58	–	131	2	
† – Conference Champion; Rankings: U Sports Top 10

2021 OUA standings
East Division
Team	W		L	PF		PA	Pts	Ply
#3 Queen's	6	–	0	172	–	44	10	†
Toronto	3	–	3	112	–	129	6	X
Ottawa	3	–	3	92	–	124	6	X
Carleton	2	–	4	99	–	147	4	X
York	0	–	6	49	–	201	0	
West Division
Team	W		L	PF		PA	Pts	Ply
#2 Western	5	–	1	266	–	68	10	X
Laurier	3	–	3	127	–	122	6	X
#8 Guelph	3	–	3	140	–	86	6	X
Waterloo	3	–	3	150	–	143	6	X
#9 McMaster	3	–	3	146	–	125	6	
Windsor	2	–	4	67	–	231	4	
† – Conference Champion; Rankings: U Sports Top 10

2021 RSEQ standings
Team	W		L	PF		PA	Pts	Ply
#1 Montréal	7	–	1	226	–	113	14	†
#5 Laval	5	–	3	234	–	108	10	X
Concordia	4	–	4	209	–	243	8	X
Sherbrooke	3	–	5	159	–	240	6	X
McGill	1	–	7	99	–	223	2	
† – Conference Champion; Rankings: U Sports Top 10

2021 Canada West standings
Team	W		L	PF		PA	Pts	Ply
#4 Saskatchewan	5	–	1	217	–	128	10	†
#7 Manitoba	4	–	2	138	–	124	8	X
Alberta	3	–	3	174	–	186	6	X
British Columbia	3	–	3	135	–	221	6	X
#10 Calgary	2	–	4	181	–	163	4	
Regina	1	–	5	123	–	146	2	
† – Conference Champion; Rankings: U Sports Top 10

== Post-season awards ==
=== Award-winners ===
	Quebec	Ontario	Atlantic	Canada West	National
Hec Crighton Trophy	Olivier Roy (Concordia)	Tre Ford (Waterloo)	Silas Fagnan (St. Francis Xavier)	Tyson Philpot (Calgary)	Tre Ford (Waterloo)
Presidents' Trophy	Alec Poirier (Laval)	A. J. Allen (Guelph)	Daniel Bell (Mount Allison)	Josiah Schakel (Alberta)	Josiah Schakel (Alberta)
J. P. Metras Trophy	Philippe Lemieux-Cardinal (Montreal)	Deionte Knight (Western)	Reece Martin (Mount Allison)	Brock Gowanlock (Manitoba)	Deionte Knight (Western)
Peter Gorman Trophy	Jaylan Greaves (Concordia)	Evan Hillock (Western)	Malcolm Bussey (St. Francis Xavier)	Garrett Rooker (British Columbia)	Jaylan Greaves (Concordia)
Russ Jackson Award	Malick Sylvain (Concordia)	Francis Perron (Ottawa)	Graeme Stevens (Mount Allison)	Josiah Schakel (Alberta)	Francis Perron (Ottawa)
Frank Tindall Trophy	Marco Iadeluca (Montreal)	Steve Snyder (Queen's)	Gary Waterman (St. Francis Xavier)	Scott Flory (Saskatchewan)	Steve Snyder (Queen's)

=== All-Canadian Team ===
Offence
	First Team	Second Team
Quarterback	Tre Ford (Waterloo)	Olivier Roy (Concordia)
Running Back	Adam Machart (Saskatchewan); Rasheed Tucker (Queen's)	Malcolm Bussey (St. Francis Xavier); Keon Edwards (Western)
Receiver	Tyson Philpot (Calgary); Jalen Philpot (Calgary); Savaughn Magnaye-Jones (Western); Jaylan Greaves (Concordia)	Kiondre Smith (Guelph); Kevin Mital (Laval); Darius Simmons (McGill); Hassane Dosso (Montréal)
Centre	Elliot Beamer (Western)	Connor Berglof (Saskatchewan)
Guard	Rodeem Brown (Alberta); Nicolas Guay (Laval)	Che Morales (St. Francis Xavier); Phillip Grohovac (Western)
Tackle	Noah Zerr (Saskatchewan); Andy Genois (Laval)	Gregor MacKellar (St. Francis Xavier); Zack Fry (Western)

Defence
	First Team	Second Team
Defensive Tackle	Reece Martin (Mount Allison); Nathan Cherry (Saskatchewan)	Malcolm Hinds (Western); Jean William Rouleau (Laval)
Defensive End	Deionte Knight (Western); Philippe Lemieux-Cardinal (Montréal)	Brock Gowanlock (Manitoba); Anthony Federico (Queen's)
Linebacker	Nick Thomas (Manitoba); Josiah Schakel (Alberta); A. J. Allen (Guelph)	Alec Poirier (Laval); Michael Brodrique (Montréal); Benjamin Carré (McGill)
Free Safety	Daniel Valente (Western)	Jayden Dalke (Alberta)
Defensive Halfback	Daniel Bell (Mount Allison); Tyshon Blackburn (Alberta)	Devynn Cromwell (Guelph); Bruno Lagacé (Montréal)
Cornerback	Marcel Arruda-Welch (Manitoba); Siriman-Harrison Bagayogo (Guelph)	Tyrell Ford (Waterloo); Ahmadou Boubacar (Concordia)

Special Teams
	First Team	Second Team
Kicker	Eric Stranz (Guelph)	Michael Arpin (Montréal)
Punter	David Solie (Saskatchewan)	Cole Crossett (Waterloo)
Returner	Kiondre Smith (Guelph)	Justin Julien (Saint Mary's)

== Post-season ==
The Vanier Cup is played between the champions of the Mitchell Bowl and the Uteck Bowl, the national semi-final games. In 2021, according to the rotating schedule, the Atlantic conference's Loney Bowl championship team will visit the Yates Cup Ontario championship team for the Mitchell Bowl. The winners of the Canada West Hardy Trophy will visit the Québec conference Dunsmore Cup championship team for the Uteck Bowl. These games are scheduled to be played on November 27, 2021. On June 17, 2021, it was announced that the 56th Vanier Cup would be played in Quebec City, Quebec, and would be hosted by Université Laval for the seventh time in school history.

=== Atlantic University Sport ===
November 13; Semi-final
1	StFX	27
4	Acadia	22
2	Mount Allison	5
3	Bishop's	23

November 20; Loney Bowl
1	StFX	25
3	Bishop's	17

=== Réseau du sport étudiant du Québec ===
November 6 Semi-finals
1	Montreal	31
4	Sherbrooke	3
2	Laval	30
3	Concordia	10

November 13; Dunsmore Cup
1	Montreal	28
2	Laval	19

=== Ontario University Athletics ===
November 6 Quarter-finals
E1	Queen's	41
E4	Carleton	14
E2	Toronto	17
E3	Ottawa	27
W1	Western	51
W4	Waterloo	24
W2	Laurier	18
W3	Guelph	31

November 13; Semi-finals
E1	Queen’s	32
E3	Ottawa	15
W1	Western	33
W3	Guelph	12

November 20; 113th Yates Cup
E1	Queen’s	0
W1	Western	29

=== Canada West Universities Athletic Association ===
November 13; Semi-finals
1	Saskatchewan	39
4	UBC	17
2	Manitoba	43
3	Alberta	17

November 20; 84th Hardy Trophy
1	Saskatchewan	45
2	Manitoba	17

=== National Semifinals ===
Mitchell Bowl

Quarter	1	2	3	4	Total
St. Francis Xavier	0	3	0	3	6
Western	23	28	3	7	61

at Western Alumni Stadium (London, Ontario)

- Date: November 27
- Game time: 12:00pm EST
- Game weather: Mostly Cloudy, −1 °C (30 °F)
- Referee: Henry Chiu
- TV announcers (CBC Sports): Mark Lee (play-by-play), Justin Dunk (analyst), Paul Eddy Saint-Vilien (analyst), Signa Butler (sideline reporter)
- Boxscore
Uteck Bowl

Quarter	1	2	3	4	Total
Saskatchewan	1	0	0	13	14
Montreal	3	1	5	1	10

at CEPSUM Stadium (Montreal)

- Date: November 27
- Game time: 3:00pm EST
- Game weather: A Few Clouds, −3 °C (27 °F)
- Game attendance: 5,100
- Referee: Stephane Roy
- TV announcers (CBC Sports): Marshall Ferguson (play-by-play), Dashawn Stephens (analyst)
- Boxscore

=== National Championship ===
56th Vanier Cup

Quarter	1	2	3	4	Total
Saskatchewan	3	9	2	7	21
Western	7	3	14	3	27

at PEPS Stadium (Quebec City)

- Date: December 4
- Game time: 1:00 p.m. EST
- Game weather: Mostly Sunny, −10 °C (14 °F)
- Game attendance: 5,840
- Referee: J. Popplestone
- TV announcers (CBC): Mark Lee (play-by-play), Justin Dunk (analyst), Paul Eddy Saint-Vilien (analyst), Signa Butler (sideline reporter)
- Boxscore

== See also ==
- 2021 NCAA Division I FBS football season
- 2021 NCAA Division I FCS football season
- 2021 NCAA Division II football season
- 2021 NCAA Division III football season
- 2021 NAIA football season
