= Bailey Feltmate =

Canadian gridiron football player (born 1998)

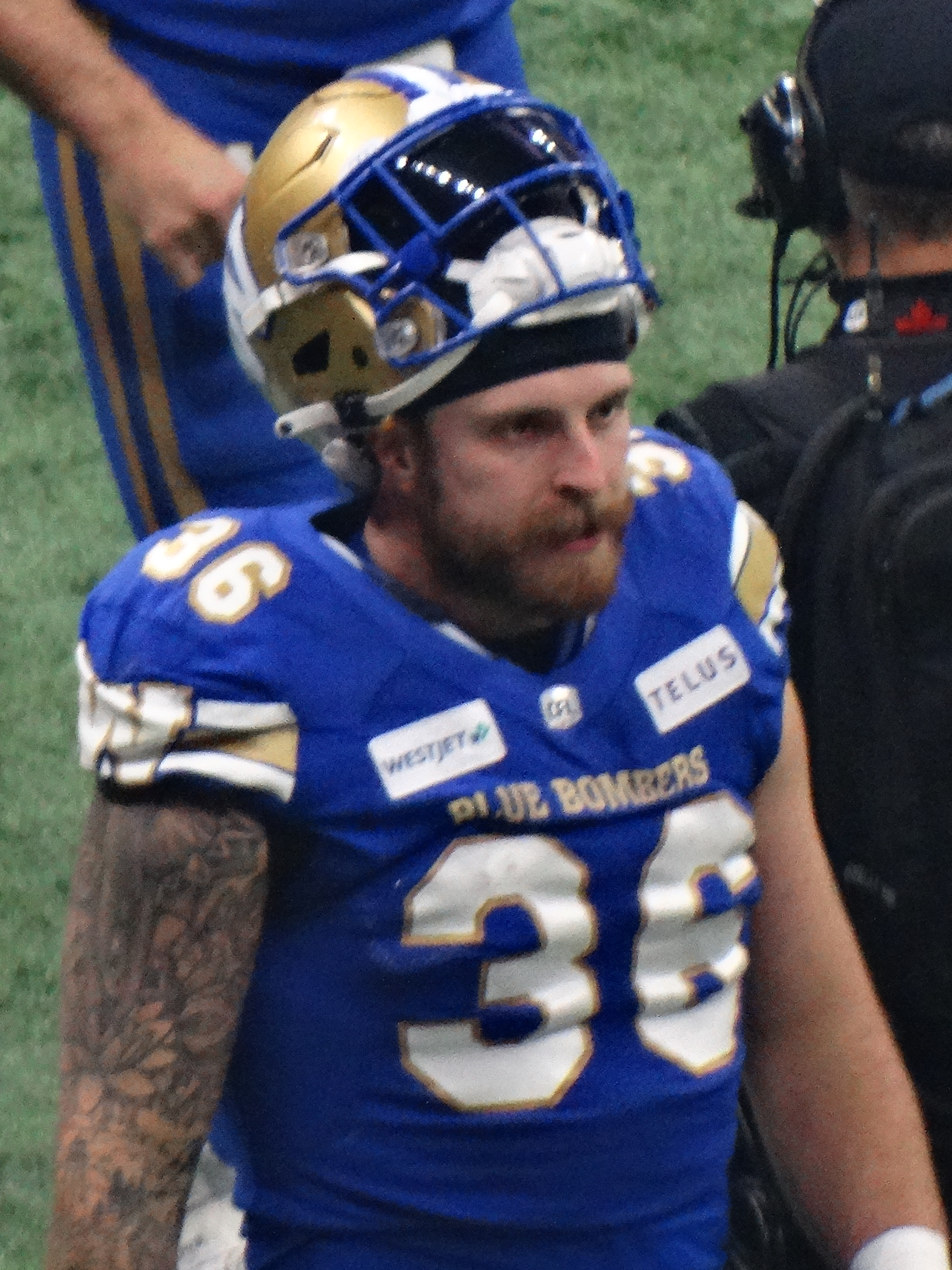
- Feltmate with the Winnipeg Blue Bombers in 2024

Hamilton Tiger Cats/Winnipeg Bluebombers/Dalhousie Tigers
- Title: Special teams coordinator

Personal information
- Born: January 22, 1998 (age 28); Moncton, New Brunswick, Canada
- Listed height: 6 ft 3 in (1.91 m)
- Listed weight: 240 lb (109 kg)

Career information
- Position: Linebacker (No. 36)
- High school: Moncton High
- University: Acadia
- CFL draft: 2020: 2nd round, 17th overall pick

Career history

Playing
- 2021–2023: Hamilton Tiger-Cats
- 2024: Winnipeg Blue Bombers

Coaching
- 2025–present: Dalhousie Tigers

Awards and highlights
- 2× Loney Bowl champion (2017, 2019); 2× Second-team All-Canadian (2017, 2019)
- Stats at CFL.ca

Bailey Feltmate (born January 22, 1998) is a Canadian former professional football linebacker and coach who is the special teams coordinator for the Dalhousie Tigers of the Atlantic Football League. He played for four seasons in the Canadian Football League (CFL) for the Hamilton Tiger-Cats and Winnipeg Blue Bombers.

== University career ==
Feltmate played U Sports football for the Acadia Axemen from 2016 to 2019. He played in 31 games over four seasons with the team where he had 203 tackles, 14 tackles for a loss, three sacks, and three forced fumbles. He won a Loney Bowl championship in 2017 and 2019 where he was also named a second-team All-Canadian in both seasons.

== Professional career ==
=== Hamilton Tiger-Cats ===
Feltmate was drafted in the second round, 17th overall by the Hamilton Tiger-Cats in the 2020 CFL draft, but did not play in 2020 due to the cancellation of the 2020 CFL season. He then signed with the team on January 21, 2021. Feltmate made the team's active roster following training camp in 2021 and played in his first career professional game on August 5, 2021, against the Winnipeg Blue Bombers, where he had two special teams tackles. He played in all 14 regular season games and had one defensive tackle and 11 special teams tackles. He also played in all three post-season games that year, including his first Grey Cup game where he had three special teams tackles in a 108th Grey Cup loss to the Blue Bombers.

In 2022, Feltmate played in 13 regular season games and had two defensive tackles and nine special teams tackles. In the 2023 season, he converted to fullback and played in 16 regular season games and had one defensive tackle and 15 special teams tackles. Feltmate signed a contract extension with the Tiger-Cats on December 7, 2023. However, he was added to the retired list on May 10, 2024.

=== Winnipeg Blue Bombers ===
On June 9, 2024, it was announced that Feltmate had signed with the Winnipeg Blue Bombers, reversing his decision to retire after the Tiger-Cats had released him from his contract. He played in eight regular season games where he had eight special teams tackles and one catch for five yards. He played in the 111th Grey Cup where he recorded one special teams tackle in the Blue Bombers' loss to the Toronto Argonauts. He announced his retirement on February 4, 2025.

== Coaching career ==
On February 4, 2025, Feltmate announced that he would be joining the Dalhousie Tigers football team coaching staff as their special teams coordinator while also attending Dalhousie University for their nursing program.
