= Adam Auclair =

Canadian gridiron football player (born 1996)

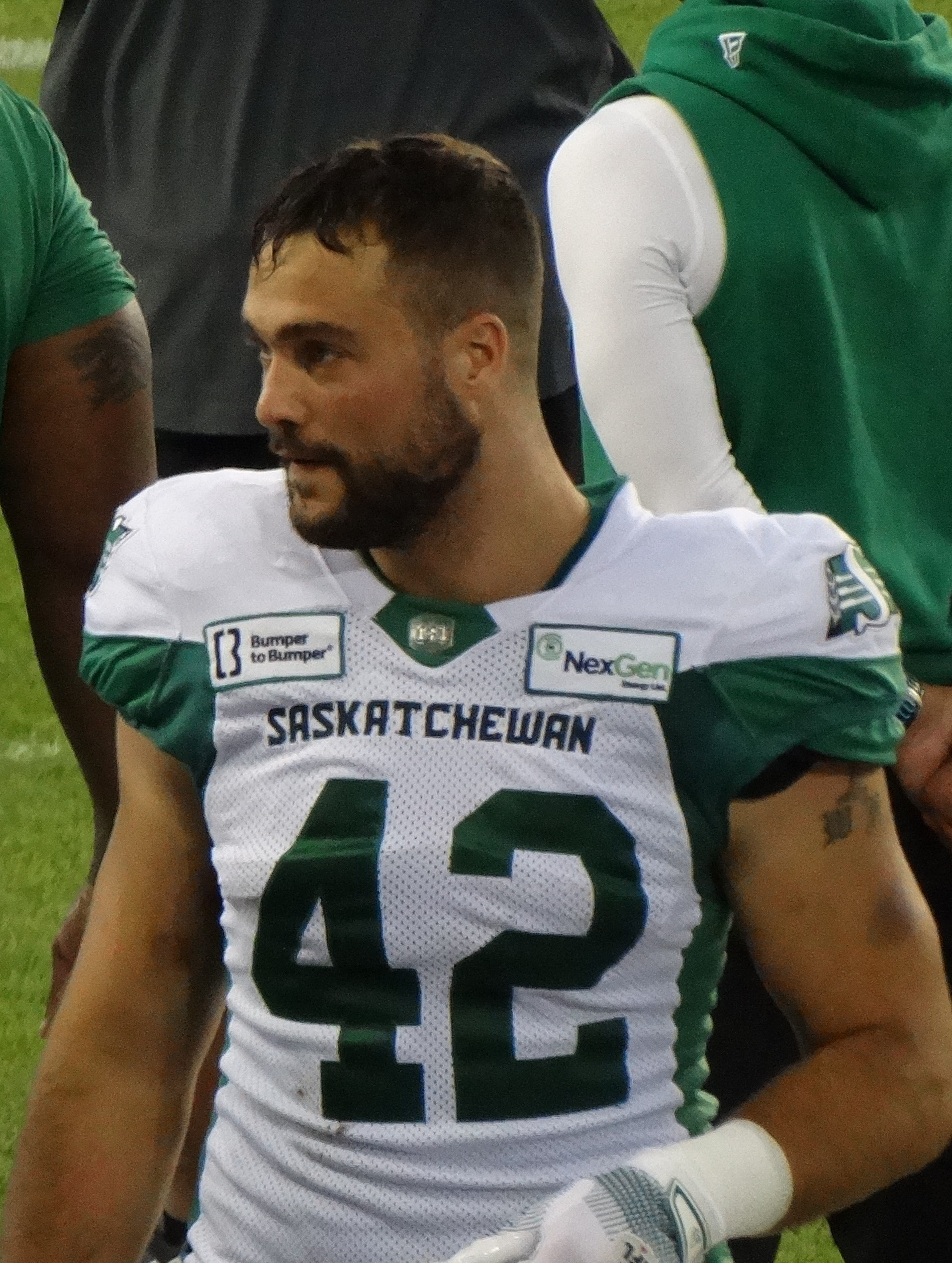
- Auclair with the Saskatchewan Roughriders in 2024

Profile
- Position: Linebacker

Personal information
- Born: March 29, 1996 (age 30); Saint-Georges, Quebec, Canada
- Listed height: 6 ft 2 in (1.88 m)
- Listed weight: 223 lb (101 kg)

Career information
- University: Laval
- CFL draft: 2020: 1st round, 6th overall pick

Career history
- 2021–2023: Ottawa Redblacks
- 2024: Saskatchewan Roughriders
- 2025: BC Lions

Awards and highlights
- 2× Vanier Cup champion (2016, 2018); First-team All-Canadian (2017); Second-team All-Canadian (2016); Presidents' Trophy (2017)
- Stats at CFL.ca

Adam Auclair (born March 29, 1996) is a Canadian professional football linebacker.

== University career ==
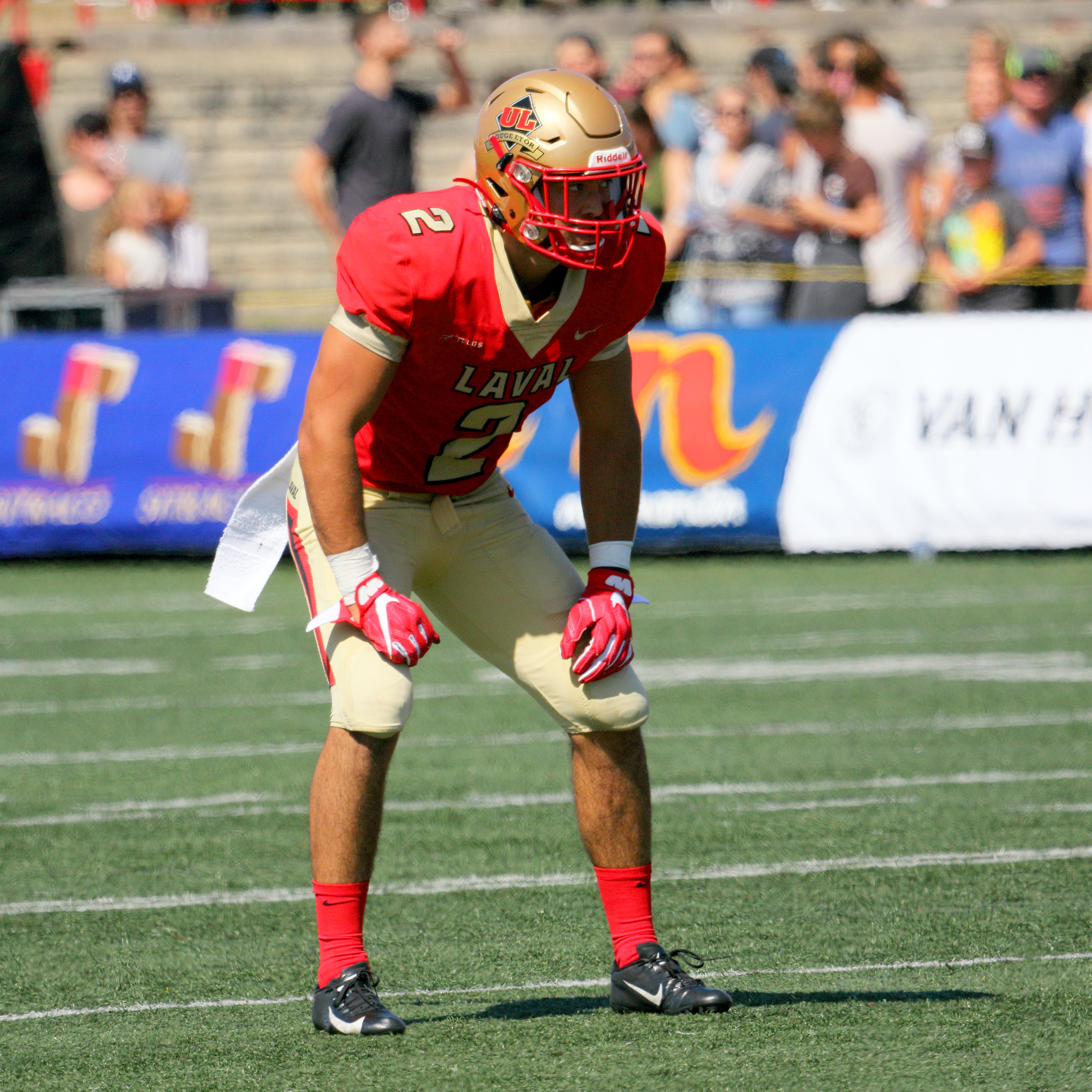
Auclair with the Laval Rouge et Or in 2019.

Auclair played U Sports football for the Laval Rouge et Or from 2016 to 2019. With Laval, he had 113.5 total tackles and seven interceptions. He was named a U Sports Second Team All-Canadian in 2016 and finished the year as a Vanier Cup champion following the team's victory in the 52nd Vanier Cup game where he also had an interception to contribute to the win.

In 2017, he was named a U Sports First Team All-Canadian and also won the Presidents' Trophy as the stand-up Defensive Player of the Year. He again played in the Vanier Cup, but the Rouge et Or lost to the Western Mustangs in the 53rd Vanier Cup.

While Auclair did not win any individual awards for the 2018 regular season, he won one of the most important ones during the post-season that year. In the 54th Vanier Cup game, he recorded 10.5 tackles, including an impactful tackle for a loss in the second half, and one interception as he won the Bruce Coulter Award as the defensive player of the game. He won his second national championship as the Rouge et Or defeated the Mustangs by a score of 34–20. In his final season, in 2019, Auclair played in eight regular season games where he had 41 tackles.

== Professional career ==
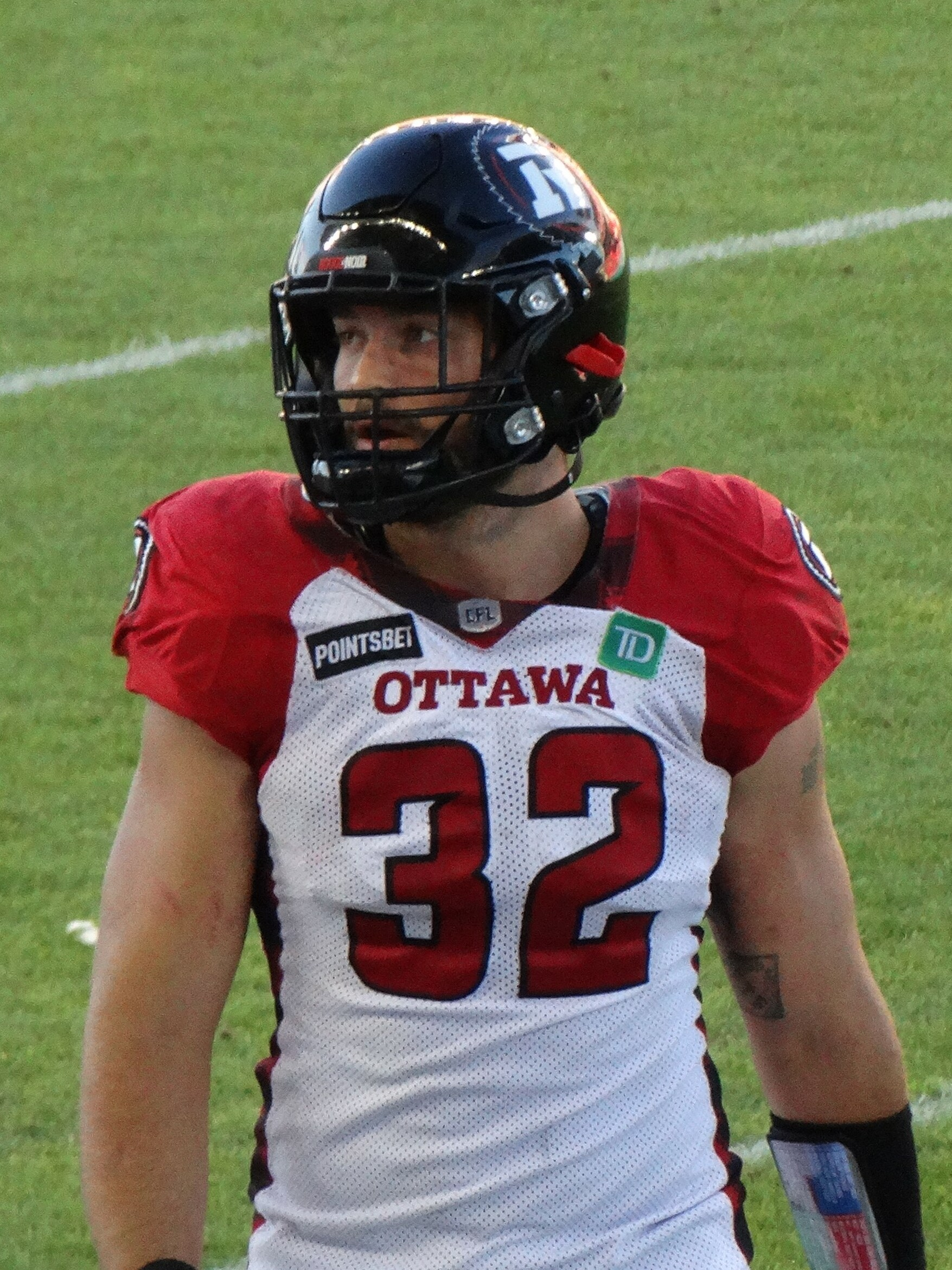
Auclair with the Ottawa Redblacks in 2022.

=== Ottawa Redblacks ===
Auclair was drafted in the first round, sixth overall, by the Ottawa Redblacks in the 2020 CFL draft, but did not play in 2020 due to the cancellation of the 2020 CFL season. Instead, he signed with the team on February 12, 2021. He made the team's active roster following training camp and played in his first professional game on August 7, 2021, against the Edmonton Elks, where he had two special teams tackles. He played in 12 out of 14 regular season games in 2021 where he had 12 defensive tackles, eight special teams tackles, and one forced fumble.

In 2022, Auclair began the season as a backup, but earned his first start at linebacker on July 8, 2022, against the Saskatchewan Roughriders, where he had six defensive tackles. He continued to start at linebacker until he suffered a hand injury following the week 9 game against the Calgary Stampeders. After being placed on the injured list for six games, he returned to play as a backup linebacker in the Thanksgiving Day Classic against the Montreal Alouettes where he had four defensive tackles and two special teams tackles. He finished the year having played in 12 regular season games where he had 44 defensive tackles, eight special teams tackles, and one sack.

In the 2023 season, Auclair played in all 18 regular season games where he had 63 defensive tackles, 14 special teams tackles, one sack, one interception, and one forced fumble. As a pending free agent in 2024, it was reported that Auclair intended to sign with the Saskatchewan Roughriders. Consequently, he was granted an early release by the Redblacks on February 8, 2024.

=== Saskatchewan Roughriders ===
On February 9, 2024, it was announced that Auclair had signed with the Saskatchewan Roughriders to a one-year contract. He played in 15 regular season games where he had 37 defensive tackles, 16 special teams tackles, and three interceptions. He became a free agent upon the expiry of his contract on February 11, 2025.

=== BC Lions ===
On February 11, 2025, it was announced that Auclair had signed with the BC Lions. On June 1, 2025, Auclair was placed on the Lions' 1-game injured list to start the 2025 CFL season. He rejoined the active roster on June 19, 2025. On July 13, 2025, Auclair was placed on the Lions' 6-game injured list after suffering an injury during the previous week's game against the Montreal Alouettes. He rejoined the active roster on September 4, 2025. On February 10, 2026, Auclair became a free agent at the conclusion of his contract with the Lions.

== Personal life ==
Auclair's brother, Antony Auclair, played as a tight end and the two played together for one year, in 2016, with the Laval Rouge et Or.
