= Ed Ilnicki =

Canadian football player (born 1995)

Profile
- Position: Running back

Personal information
- Born: July 1, 1995 (age 31); Spruce Grove, Alberta, Canada
- Listed height: 5 ft 10 in (1.78 m)
- Listed weight: 220 lb (100 kg)

Career information
- University: Alberta
- CFL draft: 2017: 7th round, 62nd overall pick

Career history
- 2017: Ottawa Redblacks*
- 2018: Ottawa Redblacks*
- * Offseason or practice squad member only

Awards and highlights
- Hec Crighton Trophy Winner (2017); First-team All-Canadian (2017)
- Stats at CFL.ca

Edward Ilnicki (born July 1, 1995) is a Canadian former football running back who played U Sports football and is a Hec Crighton Trophy winner.

== University career ==
Ilnicki played for the Alberta Golden Bears of U Sports football from 2013 to 2017. He won the Hec Crighton Trophy in 2017 as the best university football player that year. In 2017, he had 196 carries for a Canada West record 1,468 rushing yards along with 11 touchdowns as the Golden Bears qualified for the playoffs for the first time since 2010.

== Professional football career ==
Ilnicki was drafted in the seventh round, 62nd overall, in the 2017 CFL draft by the Ottawa Redblacks of the Canadian Football League (CFL). He attended training camp with the team and was released with the final cuts and went back to complete his final year of eligibility at Alberta. He was re-signed by the Redblacks on January 16, 2018 for the 2018 season, but was once again released following training camp on June 9, 2018 and was not signed by any other team.

== Rugby career ==
On July 7, 2019, Ilnicki announced his intention to pursue a rugby career with Rugby Canada after previously declining practice roster offers from CFL teams.
