= Philippe Lemieux-Cardinal =

Canadian gridiron football player (born 1996)

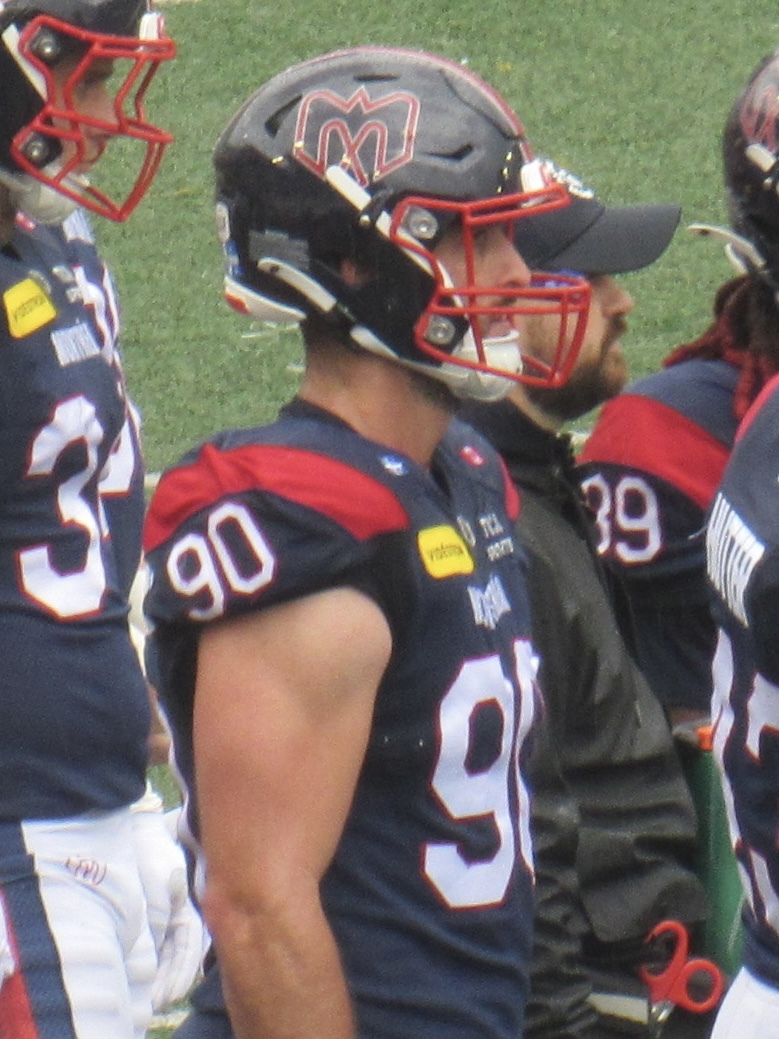
- Lemieux-Cardinal with the Montreal Alouettes in 2025

Ottawa Redblacks
- Position: Defensive lineman
- CFL status: National

Personal information
- Born: December 17, 1996 (age 29)
- Listed height: 6 ft 4 in (1.93 m)
- Listed weight: 243 lb (110 kg)

Career information
- CEGEP: Collège André-Grasset
- University: Montreal (2017–2022)
- CFL draft: 2022: undrafted

Career history
- Ottawa Redblacks (2023)*; Montreal Alouettes (2024–2025); Ottawa Redblacks (2026–present)
- * Offseason or practice squad member only

Awards and highlights
- First-team All-Canadian (2021); Second-team All-Canadian (2022); RSEQ Lineman of the Year (2021); 2× RSEQ All-Star (2021–2022)
- Stats at CFL.ca

Philippe Lemieux-Cardinal (born December 17, 1996) is a Canadian professional football defensive lineman for the Ottawa Redblacks of the Canadian Football League (CFL). He played U Sports football at Montreal.

== Early life ==
Philippe Lemieux-Cardinal was born on December 17, 1996. He is originally from Outremont, Quebec, in Montreal. He grew up a Montreal Alouettes fan. Lemieux-Cardinal played CEGEP football at Collège André-Grasset.

== University career ==
Lemieux-Cardinal played U Sports football for the Montreal Carabins of the Université de Montréal from 2017 to 2022. In 2018, he returned an interception 78 yards for a touchdown in a 75–3 win over Concordia. The 2020 U Sports football season was cancelled due to the COVID-19 pandemic. Lemieux-Cardinal played in seven games in 2021, recording 13.5 tackles, 4.5 sacks, two forced fumbles, and one fumble recovery. For his performance during the 2021 season, Lemieux-Cardinal earned first-team All-Canadian, RSEQ Lineman of the Year, and RSEQ All-Star honors. He graduated with a bachelor's degree in kinesiology.

Despite coming off a strong season, Lemieux-Cardinal went undrafted in the 2022 CFL draft at the age of 25. He then returned to Montreal for his final season of U Sports eligibility. He played in seven games during the 2022 season, totaling 17 tackles, 5.5 sacks, one fumble recovery, and two pass breakups. He was named a second-team All-Canadian and an RSEQ All-Star. Lemieux-Cardinal finished his U Sports career with totals of 72.5 tackles, 20.5 sacks, four forced fumbles, two fumble recoveries, one interception, and seven pass breakups. While still playing for the Carabins, he also attended HEC Montréal as a graduate student studying business management.

== Professional career ==
Pre-draft measurables
Height	Weight	40-yard dash	20-yard shuttle	Three-cone drill	Vertical jump	Broad jump	Bench press
6 ft 4 3/8 in (1.94 m)	243 lb (110 kg)	5.00 s	4.39 s	7.10 s	28.5 in (0.72 m)	8 ft 1 in (2.46 m)	9 reps
All values from CFL Combine

=== Ottawa Redblacks (first stint) ===
Lemieux-Cardinal signed with the Ottawa Redblacks of the Canadian Football League on January 20, 2023. He was released on May 22, 2023.

=== Montreal Alouettes ===
Lemieux-Cardinal was signed to the practice roster of the Montreal Alouettes on September 1, 2024. He was promoted to the active roster on September 13, and made his CFL debut on September 14 against the Calgary Stampeders, playing one snap on special teams as a 27-year-old rookie. He was moved back to the practice roster on September 17, released on September 27, and signed to the practice roster again on October 23, 2024. He became a free agent after the 2024 season.

Lemieux-Cardinal was signed to the Alouettes' practice roster on July 28, 2025. He was promoted to the active roster on August 7, moved back to the practice roster again on August 12, promoted to the active roster again on August 15, moved back to the practice roster again on August 19, and promoted to the active roster once again the next day.

On May 4, 2026, Lemieux-Cardinal was released by the Alouettes.

=== Ottawa Redblacks (second stint) ===
On August 28, 2026, it was announced that Lemieux-Cardinal had signed with the Ottawa Redblacks. He played in one game where he did not record a statistic and was released on September 7, 2026. He was later re-signed on October 21, 2026.
