= Waterloo Warriors football =

University Canadian football team

Waterloo Warriors
- Waterloo Warriors logo
- First season: 1957; 69 years ago
- Athletic director: Roly Webster
- Head coach: Chris Bertoia; 10th year, 24–62 (.279)
- Other staff: Brendan Conway (OC); Kevin MacNeill (DC)
- Home stadium: Warrior Field
- Year built: 2009
- Stadium capacity: 1700 (Bleacher Seating); 4000 (Sloped Lawn Seating)
- Stadium surface: FieldTurf Duraspine PRO
- Location: Waterloo, Ontario
- League: U Sports
- Conference: OUA (1980-present)
- Past associations: OIFC (1957-1966); CCIFC (1967); CIRFU (1968-1970); OUAA (1971-1973); OQIFC (1974-1979)
- All-time record: –
- Postseason record: –

Titles
- Vanier Cups: 0
- Yates Cups: 2; 1997, 1999
- Hec Crighton winners: 1 Tre Ford

Current uniform
- Colours: Black, Gold, and White
- Outfitter: Nike
- Rivals: Wilfrid Laurier Golden Hawks; Guelph Gryphons
- Website: gowarriorsgo.ca

The Waterloo Warriors football team represents the University of Waterloo in the sport of Canadian football in U Sports. The Warriors U Sports football program has been in operation since 1957, winning two Yates Cup conference championships in 1997 and 1999. Currently, they are one of six teams to have never appeared in a Vanier Cup game and the longest tenured program in the OUA to have never qualified for the national championship game.

== Recent history ==
In the 21st century, the program struggled to compete in the OUA, having not qualified for the playoffs from 2004 to 2017 and not having a winning record since 2001. The program then made national headlines in 2010 after it was discovered that a student athlete was in possession of steroids and human growth hormone in March 2010. The school then conducted a steroid investigation that had led to all 65 members of its team tested for steroids on March 31, with three positive results. Consequently, on June 14, 2010, the school announced that the program would be suspended for the 2010 season. While the football team returned for the 2011 season, it proved difficult as many players transferred to other schools after they learned they would not be able to play at Waterloo that year. Consequently, the Warriors finished winless in eight games in their return to the OUA. The team was coached by Dennis McPhee, who was the former head coach of the St. Francis Xavier X-Men football team where he won Atlantic University Sport coach of the year in 2002. In 2011, they experienced the growing pains associated with a year off of football, and losing most starters and veterans to transfers. At the end of the season, McPhee resigned as head coach on November 22, 2011.

The team was then led by Joe Paopao for the 2012 and 2013 seasons. In 2012, most expected the Warriors to be at the cold cellar of CIS, however, they surprised the football community with convincing wins against the York Lions and a huge upset victory over the Windsor Lancers. They won one game in 2013 against the expansion Carleton Ravens. Paopao resigned following the 2013 season and Marshall Bingeman's appointment as interim head coach for 2014. The team won one game in 2014 against the Lions, which was an away game.

Chris Bertoia was hired as Head Coach and Manager of Football Operations for the 2015 season. After finishing their 2015 and 2016 seasons winless, the Warriors won their first four games of the 2017 season, before losing their remaining four to finish in seventh place and just outside of the playoffs. It was the teams' best finish (seventh place) since 2007 and their best record (4–4) since 2001. In the 2018 season, the Warriors continued their strong play with another 4–4 record, but qualified for the playoffs based on their victory over the 4–4 Wilfrid Laurier Golden Hawks earlier in the season. In their first playoff appearance since 2003, the Warriors lost to the Guelph Gryphons by a score of 45–34. In 2019, the Warriors finished again with a 4–4 record, but this time earned their first post-season victory in 20 years with a resounding 44–21 win over the Ottawa Gee-Gees. The team lost a close OUA semi-final game to the Western Mustangs, ranked #1 in the country, by a score of 30–24. Following a cancelled 2020 season, the Warriors finished with a 3–3 record in 2021 behind the strength of the program's first ever Hec Crighton Trophy winner, Tre Ford. However, the Warriors lost again to the Mustangs in the quarter-final game. After Ford left the program, the team finished with a 1–7 record in 2022.

== Season-by-season record ==
The following is the record of the Waterloo Warriors football team since 1995:

| Season | Games | Won | Lost | Ties | PCT | PF | PA | Standing | Playoffs |
|---|---|---|---|---|---|---|---|---|---|
| 1995 | 8 | 4 | 3 | 1 | 0.563 | 199 | 166 | 3rd in OUAA | Lost to Western Ontario Mustangs in semi-final 23–22 |
| 1996 | 8 | 7 | 1 | 0 | 0.875 | 157 | 80 | 1st in OUAA | Defeated Wilfrid Laurier Golden Hawks in semi-final 26–23; Lost to Guelph Gryphons in Yates Cup final 23–13 |
| 1997 | 8 | 6 | 2 | 0 | 0.750 | 231 | 91 | 2nd in OUA | Defeated York Yeomen in semi-final 17–0; Defeated Western Ontario Mustangs in Yates Cup final 30–10; Lost to Ottawa Gee-Gees in Churchill Bowl 44–37 |
| 1998 | 8 | 7 | 1 | 0 | 0.875 | 297 | 150 | 2nd in OUA | Defeated Wilfrid Laurier Golden Hawks in semi-final 32–10; Lost to Western Ontario Mustangs in Yates Cup final 21–14 |
| 1999 | 8 | 4 | 4 | 0 | 0.500 | 232 | 149 | 4th in OUA | Defeated Western Ontario Mustangs in semi-final 35–21; Defeated Wilfrid Laurier Golden Hawks in Yates Cup final 32–20; Lost to Saint Mary's Huskies in Atlantic Bowl 21–14 |
| 2000 | 8 | 4 | 4 | 0 | 0.500 | 208 | 176 | 4th in OUA | Lost to McMaster Marauders in semi-final 44–20 |
| 2001 | 8 | 4 | 3 | 1 | 0.563 | 194 | 108 | 5th in OUA | Lost to Western Ontario Mustangs in quarter-final 19–11 |
| 2002 | 8 | 3 | 5 | 0 | 0.375 | 111 | 178 | 7th in OUA | Lost to Queen's Golden Gaels in quarter-final 51–14 |
| 2003 | 8 | 2 | 6 | 0 | 0.250 | 142 | 328 | 8th in OUA | Lost to McMaster Marauders in quarter-final 70–7 |
| 2004 | 8 | 2 | 6 | 0 | 0.250 | 149 | 296 | 8th in OUA | Did not qualify |
| 2005 | 8 | 2 | 6 | 0 | 0.250 | 139 | 302 | 9th in OUA | Did not qualify |
| 2006 | 8 | 3 | 5 | – | 0.375 | 117 | 264 | 7th in OUA | Did not qualify |
| 2007 | 8 | 3 | 5 | – | 0.375 | 123 | 252 | 7th in OUA | Did not qualify |
| 2008 | 8 | 2 | 6 | – | 0.250 | 147 | 285 | 9th in OUA | Did not qualify |
| 2009 | 8 | 3 | 5 | – | 0.375 | 226 | 213 | 7th in OUA | Did not qualify |
| 2010 | team suspended | | | | | | | | |
| 2011 | 8 | 0 | 8 | – | 0.000 | 95 | 421 | 10th in OUA | Did not qualify |
| 2012 | 8 | 2 | 6 | – | 0.250 | 145 | 333 | 10th in OUA | Did not qualify |
| 2013 | 8 | 1 | 7 | – | 0.125 | 161 | 406 | 10th in OUA | Did not qualify |
| 2014 | 8 | 1 | 7 | – | 0.125 | 76 | 418 | 10th in OUA | Did not qualify |
| 2015 | 8 | 0 | 8 | – | 0.000 | 66 | 380 | 11th in OUA | Did not qualify |
| 2016 | 8 | 0 | 8 | – | 0.000 | 77 | 435 | 11th in OUA | Did not qualify |
| 2017 | 8 | 4 | 4 | – | 0.500 | 299 | 339 | 7th in OUA | Did not qualify |
| 2018 | 8 | 4 | 4 | – | 0.500 | 263 | 272 | 6th in OUA | Lost to Guelph Gryphons in quarter-final 45–34 |
| 2019 | 8 | 4 | 4 | – | 0.500 | 288 | 283 | 5th in OUA | Defeated Ottawa Gee-Gees in quarter-final 44–21; Lost to Western Mustangs in semi-final 30–24 |
| 2020 | Season cancelled due to COVID-19 pandemic | | | | | | | | |
| 2021 | 6 | 3 | 3 | – | 0.500 | 150 | 143 | 4th in OUA West | Lost to Western Mustangs in quarter-final 51–24 |
| 2022 | 8 | 1 | 7 | – | 0.125 | 154 | 308 | 10th in OUA | Did not qualify |
| 2023 | 8 | 3 | 5 | – | 0.375 | 188 | 251 | 7th in OUA | Lost to Wilfrid Laurier Golden Hawks in quarter-final 69–0 |
| 2024 | 8 | 0 | 8 | – | 0.000 | 148 | 336 | 11th in OUA | Did not qualify |
| 2025 | 8 | 2 | 6 | – | 0.250 | 137 | 283 | 9th in OUA | Did not qualify |
| 2026 | 8 | 3 | 5 | – | 0.375 | 199 | 280 | 7th in OUA | Did not qualify |

== National postseason results ==
Vanier Cup Era (1965-current)
| Year | Game | Opponent | Result |
|---|---|---|---|
| 1997 | Churchill Bowl | Ottawa | L 37-44 |
| 1999 | Atlantic Bowl | Saint Mary's | L 14-21 |

Waterloo is 0-2 in national semi-final games and has not appeared in a Vanier Cup.

== Head coaches ==
| Name | Years | Notes |
|---|---|---|
| Carl Totzke | 1957–1967 | |
| Wally Delahey | 1968–1981 | |
| Bob McKillop | 1982–1987 | |
| Chuck McMann | 1988 | |
| Tuffy Knight | 1989–1997 | |
| Chris Triantafilou | 1998–2006 | |
| Dennis McPhee | 2007–2011 | |
| Joe Paopao | 2012–2013 | |
| Marshall Bingeman | 2014 | |
| Chris Bertoia | 2015–present | |

== National award winners ==
- Hec Crighton Trophy: Tre Ford (2021)
- J. P. Metras Trophy: Chris Best (2006)
- Presidents' Trophy: Cory Delaney (1994), Jason Van Geel (1997)
- Peter Gorman Trophy: Jordan Verdone (2008)
- Frank Tindall Trophy: David "Tuffy" Knight (1989)
- Lois and Doug Mitchell Award: Tre Ford (2022)

== Waterloo Warriors in the CFL ==
As of the start of the 2026 CFL season, former Warriors players on CFL rosters include:

- Tre Ford, Hamilton Tiger-Cats
- Tyrell Ford, Edmonton Elks
- Tyson Hergott, Toronto Argonauts
- Tyler Ternowski, Hamilton Tiger-Cats
