= Tre Ford =

Canadian gridiron football player (born 1998)

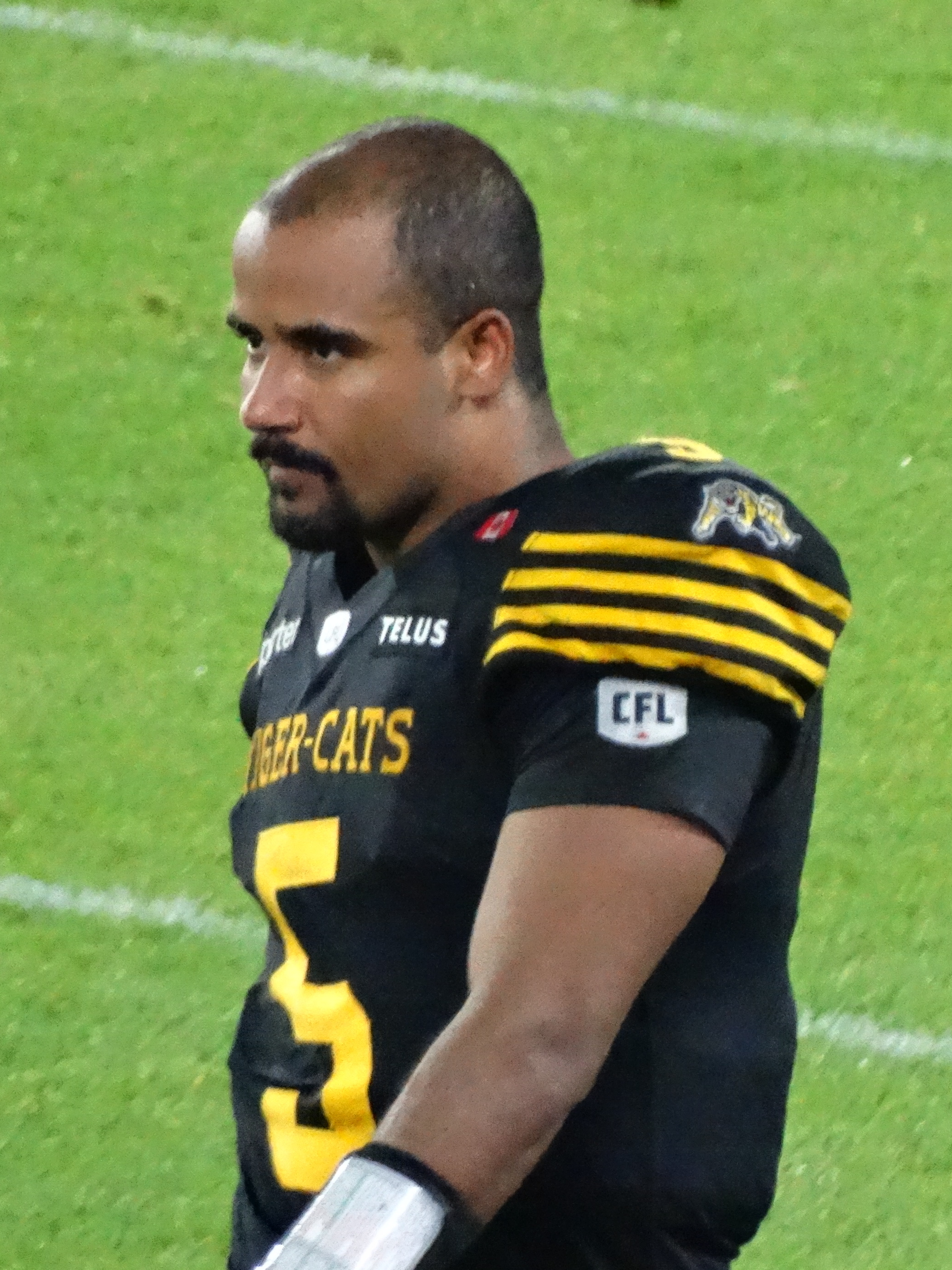
- Ford with the Hamilton Tiger-Cats in 2026

No. 5 – Hamilton Tiger-Cats
- Position: Quarterback
- Roster status: Active
- CFL status: National

Personal information
- Born: March 30, 1998 (age 28); Niagara Falls, Ontario, Canada
- Listed height: 5 ft 11 in (1.80 m)
- Listed weight: 192 lb (87 kg)

Career information
- High school: A. N. Myer Secondary (Niagara Falls, Ontario)
- University: Waterloo
- CFL draft: 2022: 1st round, 8th overall pick

Career history
- Edmonton Elks (2022–2025); Hamilton Tiger-Cats (2026–present)

Awards and highlights
- First-team All-Canadian (2021); Second-team All-Canadian (2019); Peter Gorman Trophy (2017); Hec Crighton Trophy (2021); Lois and Doug Mitchell Award (2022)

Career CFL statistics as of 2026
- Passing completions: 476
- Passing attempts: 714
- Completion percentage: 66.7
- TD–INT: 36–22
- Passing yards: 6,114
- Stats at CFL.ca

Tre Ford (born March 30, 1998) is a Canadian professional football quarterback for the Hamilton Tiger-Cats of the Canadian Football League (CFL). He was named a Hec Crighton Trophy winner in 2021 as U Sports football's most outstanding player and won the Lois and Doug Mitchell Award as U Sports top male university athlete.

== Early life ==
Ford played quarterback at A. N. Myer Secondary School where he led the Marauders to a Junior Metrobowl championship and three consecutive OFSAA championships.

== University career ==
After being recruited by several U Sports football programs to play at a different position, Ford decided to commit to the Waterloo Warriors after head coach Chris Bertoia confirmed that the team wanted him to continue playing quarterback. In his first season in 2017, he split playing time with the incumbent starting quarterback, Lucas McConnell, and played in seven games where he completed 48 passes out of 72 attempts for 673 yards for six touchdowns and five interceptions. However, he also had 717 rushing yards, which was the 12th highest in the country, and four rushing touchdowns, which resulted in him being named the U Sports Rookie of the Year. After finishing winless in the two seasons previous, Ford helped the Warriors finish with a 4–4 record and a seventh place finish in the Ontario University Athletics (OUA) conference.

In 2018, Ford became the team's starting quarterback where he played in eight regular season games and passed for 2,822 yards, 27 touchdowns, and two interceptions with 74.1 completion percentage, which was the highest in OUA history. The team again finished with a 4–4 record, but qualified for the playoffs for the first time since 2003. In the 45–34 OUA quarter-final loss to the Guelph Gryphons, he completed 23 passes out of 32 attempts for 295 yards and three touchdowns and had 11 carries for 150 rushing yards and two touchdowns. At the end of the season, Ford was named the OUA Most Valuable Player.

Ford continued his strong play in the 2019 season as he again started in all eight regular season games where he passed for 2,158 yards with 13 touchdowns and seven interceptions. He also rushed for 634 yards and six touchdowns as the Warriors finished with another 4–4 record. In the playoffs, Ford led the Warriors to the team's first post-season victory since 1999 as the Warriors defeated the Ottawa Gee-Gees by a score of 44–21. However, the Warriors fell to the Mustangs in the OUA Semi-Final 30–24 after Ford had 226 yards passing with three touchdowns and two interceptions (including one that was returned for a touchdown) along with 72 rushing yards. For his outstanding season, Ford was named a U Sports Second Team All-Canadian.

With the 2020 U Sports football season cancelled due to the COVID-19 pandemic in Canada, Ford elected to defer his CFL draft eligibility by one year to 2022 and returned to play for the Warriors in 2021. In just six regular season games, he completed 118 passes out of 186 attempts for 1,465 yards with 10 passing touchdowns and four interceptions and led the OUA in passing yards. He was also fourth in the country in rushing yards per game as he had 59 carries for 629 yards and three touchdowns. At the end of the season, he became the first Warriors player to win the Hec Crighton Trophy as the most outstanding football player in U Sports and was named a U Sports First Team All-Canadian. He was also the first Waterloo player to win the Lois and Doug Mitchell Award as U Sports top male university athlete for the 2021–22 season.

Despite having one more year of playing eligibility, Ford stated that his intention was to play professionally in 2022.

Following the completion of the 2022 CFL season Ford started working towards an MBA at Laurentian University. He is also a member of the university's track team.

=== U Sports statistics ===
		Passing							Rushing
Year	Team	GD	Att	Comp	Pct	Yards	TD	Int	Att	Yards	Avg	Long	TD
2017	WAT	6	56	37	66.1	531	4	4	62	548	8.8	31	4
2018	WAT	9	294	217	73.8	3,093	30	2	85	771	9.1	39	4
2019	WAT	10	294	204	69.4	2,609	18	10	97	830	8.6	61	8
2020	WAT	Season cancelled due to Covid-19							Season cancelled due to Covid-19
2021	WAT	7	219	139	63.5	1,770	12	6	66	667	10.1	44	3
U Sports totals		32	863	597	69.2	8,003	64	22	310	2,816	9.1	61	19

== Professional career ==
Pre-draft measurables
Height	Weight	Arm length	Hand span	Wingspan	40-yard dash	10-yard split	20-yard split	20-yard shuttle	Three-cone drill	Vertical jump	Broad jump
5 ft 11 3/8 in (1.81 m)	197 lb (89 kg)	30 in (0.76 m)	9 1/8 in (0.23 m)	6 ft 0 1/2 in (1.84 m)	4.49 s	1.58 s	2.56 s	4.49 s	7.50 s	36.0 in (0.91 m)	10 ft 4 in (3.15 m)
All values from Pro Day

Ford was ranked as the fourth best player in the Canadian Football League's Amateur Scouting Bureau final rankings for players eligible in the 2022 CFL draft, and first by players in U Sports. Due to his strong testing numbers at the University of Buffalo pro day where his 40-yard dash time of 4.45 was the best of any 2022 NFL draft-eligible quarterback, there was also speculation that Ford would be signed by a National Football League team. While he was undrafted in the 2022 NFL Draft and was not signed by an NFL team, he received mini-camp invites from the Baltimore Ravens and New York Giants.

=== Edmonton Elks ===
Ford was then drafted in the first round (8th overall) by the Edmonton Elks in the 2022 CFL draft. On May 11, 2022, it was announced that Ford had signed with the Elks. With the Elks struggling to start the season (0–3), head coach Chris Jones announced that Ford would replace veteran Nick Arbuckle for the team's fourth game of the season against the Hamilton Tiger-Cats. Ford managed to lead the Elks to a narrow win, completing 15 of 26 passes for 159 yards with one touchdown and one interception. He also carried the ball six times gaining 61 yards on the ground. In his second career start Ford suffered a shoulder injury in the first quarter and was forced to leave the game. The following day it was announced that he would miss multiple weeks with a collarbone injury. In mid-September, Jones confirmed that Tre Ford would return to the active lineup for the team's Week 15 matchup, with Taylor Cornelius remaining as the starter. Following the season, Ford had a workout with the Las Vegas Raiders (NFL) in December 2022 and with the New England Patriots in January 2023.

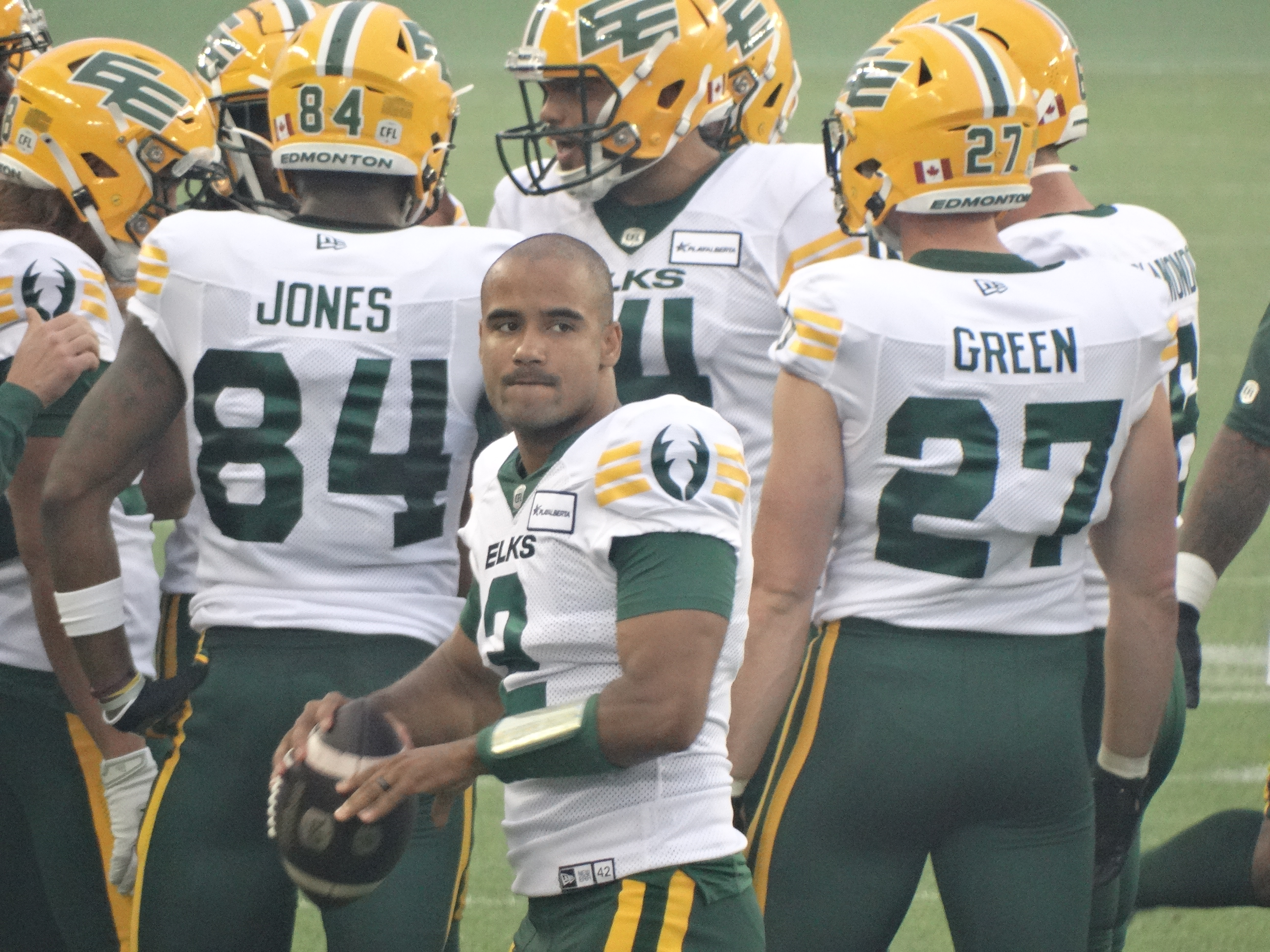
Ford in 2024 with the Elks

Ford began the 2023 season as the third-string quarterback on the roster, behind Cornelius and Jarret Doege. Despite the team starting the season with six straight losses, head coach Chris Jones reiterated that he was not willing to give Ford the start at quarterback. During the team's bye week in week 9, offensive coordinator Stephen McAdoo was demoted and replaced with Jarious Jackson and Ford was named the new starting quarterback. Entering the team's week 10 matchup with the Blue Bombers with a 0–8 record, the Elks held a 22–0 lead in the second quarter, but ultimately fell 38–29. The following week, Ford led the Elks' to their first win of the season. In Week 12, Ford led Edmonton to a victory over the Redblacks, snapping a 22-game home losing streak. He finished the 2023 season with a 4–6 record as a starter as Edmonton missed the playoffs for a third consecutive year. At the end of the year, Ford was named the Elks' nominee for Most Outstanding Player and Most Outstanding Canadian.

Despite Ford's personal success of 2023, the Elks signed McLeod Bethel-Thompson on January 7, 2024, with his salary making him the presumptive starter in place of Ford. Elks Assistant GM Geroy Simon later confirmed this by stating "Tre is the long-term answer and McLeod is the answer right now". Following an 0–7 start to the 2024 season, the Elks announced that Ford would make his first start of the season in their Week 9 game versus the Saskatchewan Roughriders. Ford led the Elks to their first win of the season, a 42–31 victory. He started the next game against the BC Lions, but suffered a rib injury and missed the remainder of the game along with the team's next two games. Upon returning to the roster, Bethel-Thompson continued to start, giving Ford time to recover. Following a bye in week 15, Ford returned to start against the Blue Bombers and faced his brother, Tyrell Ford, for the first time. However, Ford struggled in the game, completing 10 of 17 pass attempts for 131 passing yards with two interceptions and a lost fumble, and was replaced by Bethel-Thompson in the fourth quarter in a 27–14 loss. While clinging to playoff hopes, interim head coach Jarious Jackson announced that Bethel-Thompson would start in the following week, which was also a loss to the Blue Bombers. With the Elks eliminated from the playoffs following Bethel-Thompson's loss to the Roughriders, Ford started the last two games of the regular season, winning both and improving his season record as a starter to 4–1 as the Elks finished 7–11. Ford dressed in 16 regular season games where he completed 18 of 117 pass attempts for 1,137 yards with ten touchdowns and five interceptions.

As a pending free agent entering the 2025 season, Ford was named the top available player in the February 2025 pool. Rather than test free agency, Ford signed a three-year contract extension with Edmonton on December 6, 2024. Ford began the 2025 season as the Elks' starting quarterback but was benched for Cody Fajardo after a 1–4 start. In his five starts, Ford completed 82 of 121 pass attempts for 984 yards with five passing touchdowns and three interceptions, along with 16 carries for 152 yards and one rushing touchdown. Fajardo played in the remaining 13 games and Ford did not attempt a pass for the rest of the season. Fajardo signed an extension as the presumptive starter entering the 2026 season and Ford was later released on January 30, 2026.

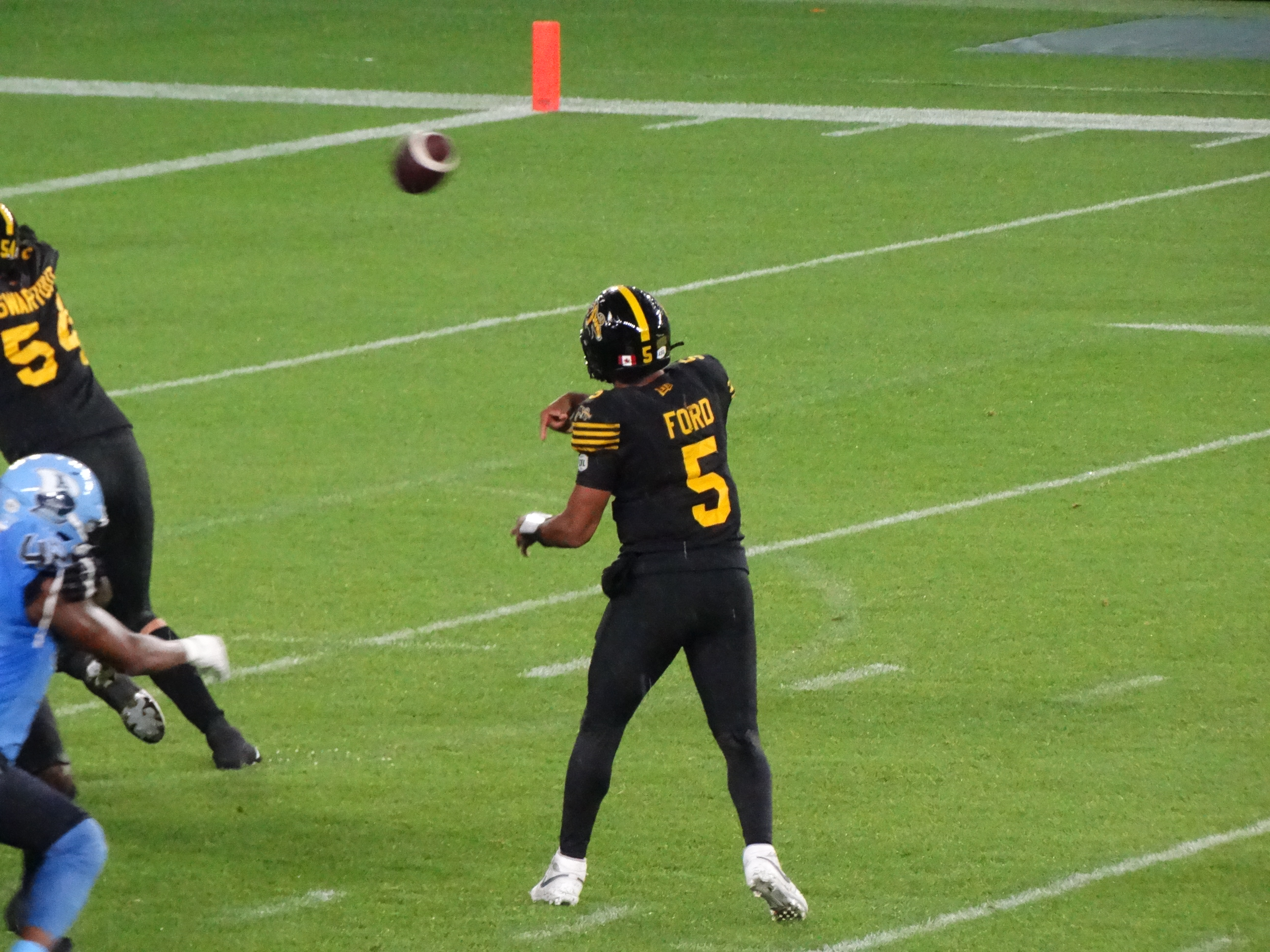
Ford in 2026 with the Tiger-Cats

=== Hamilton Tiger-Cats ===
On February 2, 2026, it was announced that Ford had signed a two-year contract with the Hamilton Tiger-Cats. In week 5 of the 2026 season, against the Winnipeg Blue Bombers, Ford entered the game following an injury to starter Bo Levi Mitchell in the 3rd quarter. He completed three of seven passes for 12 yards and one interception in a 14–13 loss. Hamilton initially started third-string quarterback Jake Dolegala for the following week against Saskatchewan, but Ford entered the game during garbage time of a 38–7 loss. On July 17, 2026, Ford was named the starter for Hamilton's next game against the Toronto Argonauts. In his first start with the Tiger-Cats, Ford completed 21 of 27 passes for 218 yards with one touchdown and one interception, and rushed 10 times for 109 yards in the 24–23 victory. However, in his next start against the Alouettes, he passed for just 164 yards with one touchdown pass and one interception along with 24 rushing yards in the 31–18 loss. In week 9 against the Stampeders, Ford completed four of 10 pass attempts for 58 yards before being replaced by Harrison Frost in the 44–20 loss. Frost started and played the entirety of the next game against the Lions, a 27–24 loss, but Ford replaced him in the second half of the week 12 game against the Roughriders. With the Tiger-Cats down 13–10 when Ford entered the game and 19–10 after three quarters, he led the team to 16 points in the fourth quarter and a 26–19 victory, highlighted by a 41-yard touchdown pass to Keric Wheatfall. Ford was again named the starter in the next game against the Argonauts where he had 19 completions on 32 attempts for a career-high 356 passing yards and 33 rushing yards in the 39–20 loss.

=== CFL statistics ===
Year	Team	Games			Passing								Rushing			
Year	Team	GP	GS	Rec	Cmp	Att	Pct	Yds	Y/A	TD	Int	Rtg	Att	Yds	Avg	TD
2022	EDM	10	3	1–2	40	69	58.0	461	6.7	2	5	57.7	19	149	7.8	0
2023	EDM	16	10	4–6	153	227	67.4	2,069	9.1	12	6	102.8	66	622	9.4	3
2024	EDM	16	5	4–1	84	117	71.8	1,137	9.7	10	5	113.1	23	206	9.0	0
2025	EDM	18	5	1–4	82	121	67.8	984	8.1	5	3	95.9	16	152	9.5	1
2026	HAM	18	7	2–5	117	180	65.0	1,463	8.1	7	3	96.1	47	476	10.1	1
CFL totals		78	30	12–18	476	714	66.7	6,114	8.6	36	22	97.3	171	1,605	9.4	5

== Personal life ==
Ford married his long-time fiancée, Anika Nadeau, on June 13, 2022. Ford and his wife welcomed their first child, Anaïs Ford, in December 2022. Ford has a twin brother, Tyrell Ford, who plays defensive back, for the Edmonton Elks and played for the Waterloo Warriors. He began playing football when he was six years old when his father, Robert, introduced him to the sport and also served as his coach.
