= Kurleigh Gittens Jr. =

Canadian gridiron football player (born 1997)

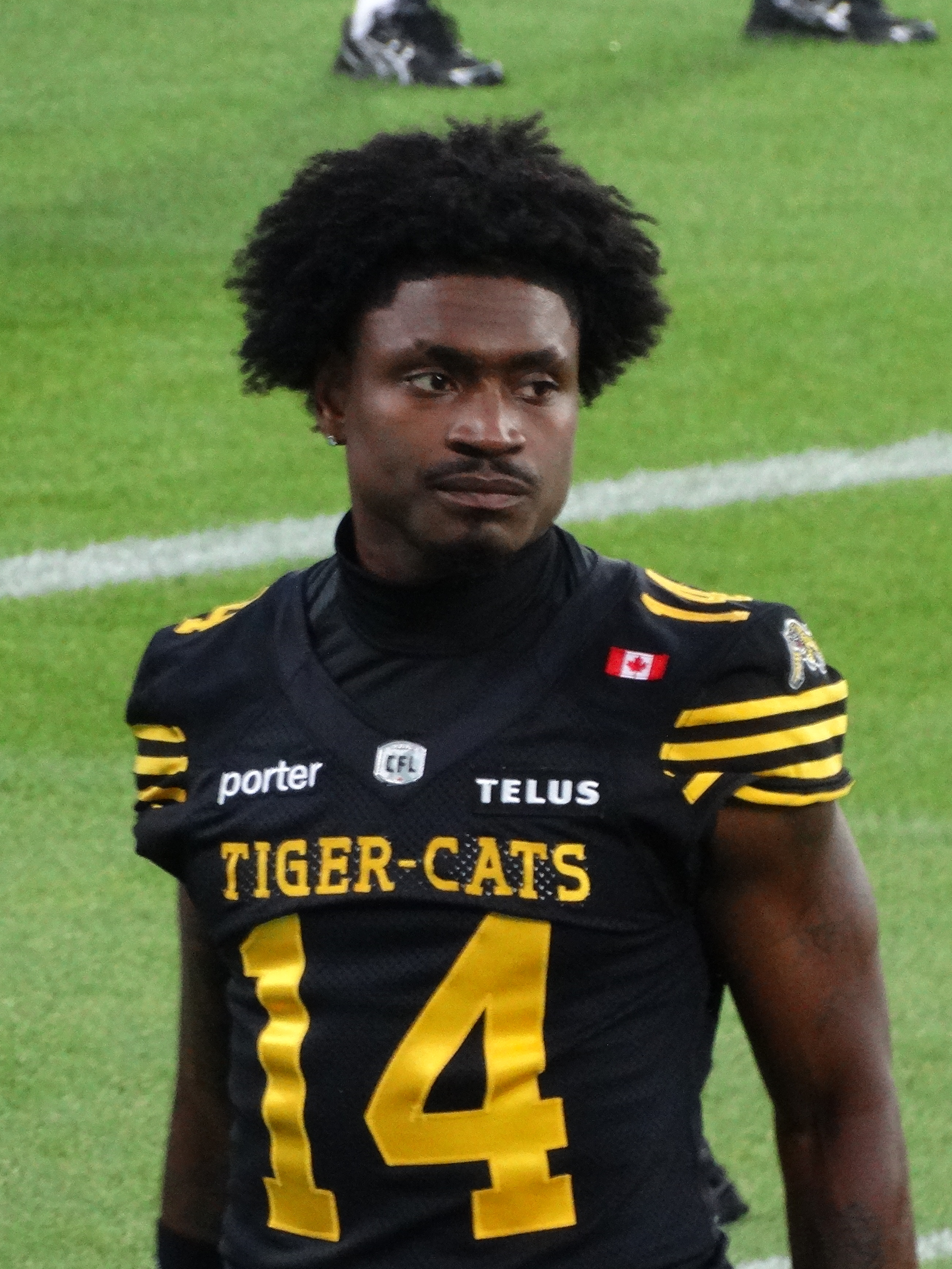
- Gittens with the Hamilton Tiger-Cats in 2026

No. 14 – Hamilton Tiger-Cats
- Position: Wide receiver
- Roster status: Active
- CFL status: National

Personal information
- Born: September 20, 1997 (age 29); Guyana
- Listed height: 5 ft 11 in (1.80 m)
- Listed weight: 191 lb (87 kg)

Career information
- High school: Sir Wilfrid Laurier Secondary
- University: Wilfrid Laurier
- CFL draft: 2019: 3rd round, 23rd overall pick

Career history
- 2019–2023: Toronto Argonauts
- 2024–2025: Edmonton Elks
- 2026–present: Hamilton Tiger-Cats

Awards and highlights
- Grey Cup champion (2022); CFL All-Star (2022); 2× CFL East All-Star (2021, 2022); Lew Hayman Trophy (2022); Yates Cup champion (2016); OUA MVP (2017)

Career CFL statistics as of 2026
- Games played: 106
- Receptions: 384
- Receiving yards: 4,502
- Receiving touchdowns: 25
- Stats at CFL.ca

Kurleigh Gittens Jr. (born September 20, 1997) is a professional Canadian football wide receiver for the Hamilton Tiger-Cats of the Canadian Football League (CFL). He played U Sports football for the Wilfrid Laurier Golden Hawks where he was the OUA Most Valuable Player in 2017.

== Early life ==
Gittens was born on September 20, 1997, in Guyana, the son of Kurleigh Gittens Sr. At age seven, he and his father moved to Ottawa.

== University career ==
Gittens played U Sports football with the Wilfrid Laurier Golden Hawks from 2015 to 2018. He immediately saw playing time as a rookie in 2015, playing in all eight regular season games and recording 40 receptions for 461 yards and two touchdowns. He also returned kickoffs and punts, and notably scored a 101-yard kickoff return touchdown against the McMaster Marauders on October 17, 2015.

In 2016, Gittens continued to contribute to a dominant 7–1 Golden Hawks team as he had 27 receptions for 461 yards and six touchdowns. He also scored on a 13-yard rushing touchdown and a 92-yard punt return touchdown this season while being featured more prominently on kick returns. The Golden Hawks advanced in the playoffs that year to the Yates Cup and the team recorded the largest fourth quarter comeback in the history of the OUA championship game as they scored 24 unanswered points to win the game against the home team Western Mustangs. Gittens scored on a three-yard touchdown catch to tie the game at 40–40 and the Golden Hawks later kicked a game-winning field goal to secure the victory.

Gittens had a breakout season in 2017 as he led U Sports football players in receptions with 75 and was second in the country with 953 receiving yards in eight games. His 75 receptions was a single-season record for the most in U Sports history. He also scored a career-high seven touchdowns this season (six receiving and one punt return) en route to being named a U Sports first-team all-Canadian at wide receiver and a U Sports second-team all-Canadian as a return specialist. For his outstanding 2017 season, Gittens was also named the OUA Most Valuable Player as the runner up to the U Sports Hec Crighton Trophy.

In his fourth year in 2018, Gittens again posted dominant numbers as he caught 63 passes for 807 yards and three touchdowns and a career-high 39 punt returns for 396 yards and one touchdown. However, the Golden Hawks finished with a 4–4 record and failed to qualify for the playoffs for the first time in his four years with the program. Nonetheless, Gittens was named a U Sports first-team all-Canadian at both the wide receiver and kick returner positions, becoming the first Laurier football player to be named to the first-team at two different positions (he was also the first to be named to a first-team and second-team the year prior). He also set the OUA record for career receptions with 206 and was just the fifth U Sports football player to record over 200 catches in a career. Of the five players to have reached this milestone, Gittens was the only one to accomplish this in four years, while the other four players did so in five years.

== Professional career ==
Pre-draft measurables
Height	Weight	40-yard dash	20-yard shuttle	Three-cone drill	Vertical jump	Broad jump	Bench press
5 ft 11 1/8 in (1.81 m)	191 lb (87 kg)	4.62 s	4.40 s	7.38 s	31.5 in (0.80 m)	9 ft 10 3/8 in (3.01 m)	9 reps
All values from CFL Combine

=== Toronto Argonauts ===
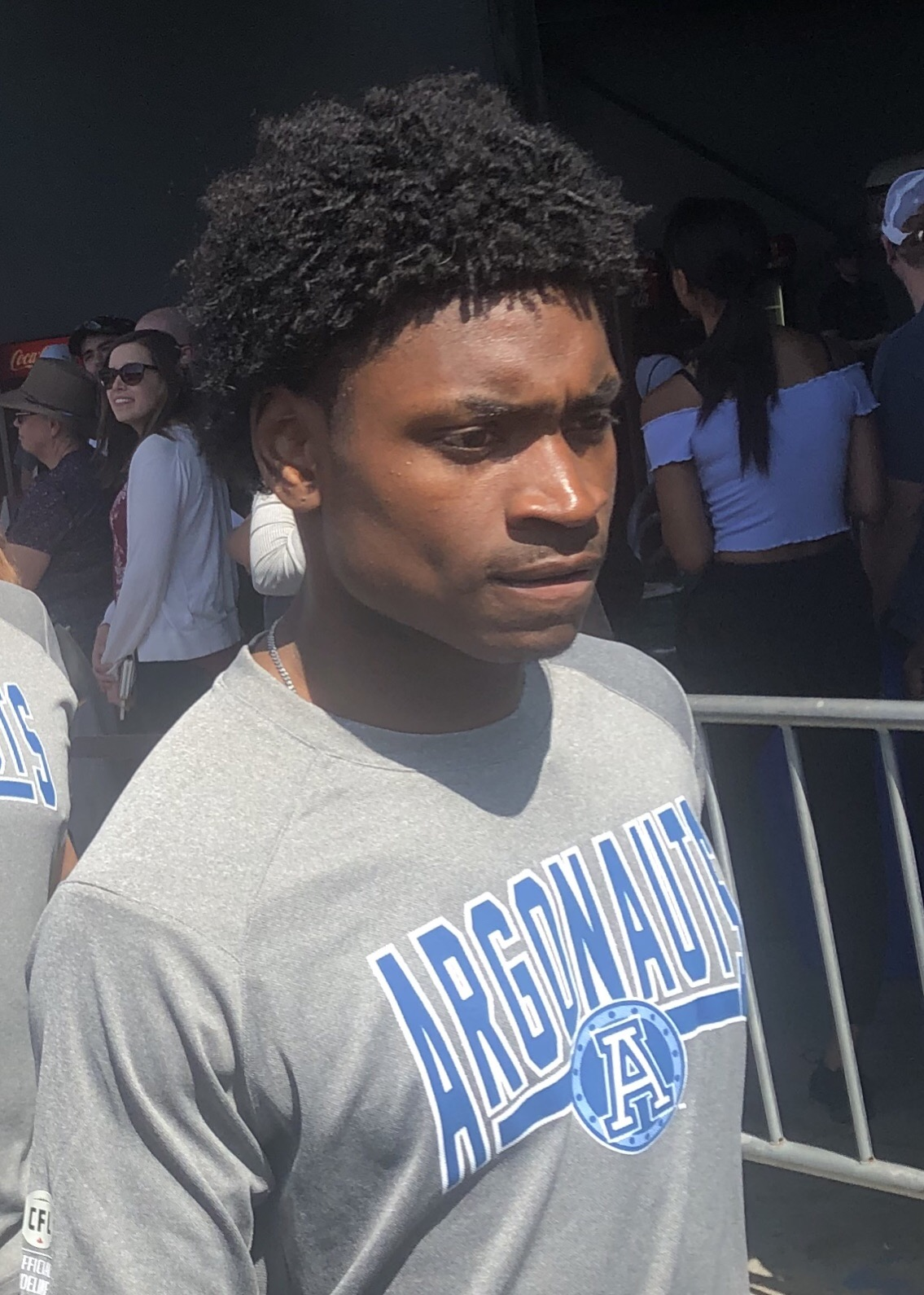
Gittens with the Toronto Argonauts in 2019

In the final CFL Scouting Bureau Rankings, Gittens was named the 16th best available player in the 2019 CFL draft. He was then drafted in the third round, 23rd overall, by the Toronto Argonauts in the 2019 draft and signed with the team on May 16, 2019. He began the 2019 season on the practice roster, but was elevated to the active roster in week 3 and played in his first professional football game on July 6, 2019 against the BC Lions. As the season progressed, his role with the team grew as he was featured on kick returns where he recorded his first three kickoff returns, which totaled 53 yards, in the Labour Day Classic against the Hamilton Tiger-Cats. He caught his first CFL pass on October 5, 2019 from McLeod Bethel-Thompson in a game against the BC Lions. With the Argonauts eliminated from post-season contention, Gittens started his first professional football game at wide receiver in the last game of the regular season on November 2, 2019 against the Tiger-Cats, but did not record any receptions. For the season, he played in 13 games and recorded one catch for 10 yards, two punt returns for eight yards, 14 kickoff returns for 230 yards, and one missed field goal return for 12 yards.

Gittens did not play in 2020 due to the 2020 CFL season being cancelled. On December 29, 2020, it was announced that Gittens had signed an extension with the Argonauts. In the first game of the 2021 Toronto Argonauts season against the Calgary Stampeders, on August 7, 2021, he scored his first professional touchdown on a 27-yard pass from McLeod Bethel-Thompson. In the pandemic-shortened 2021 CFL season, Gittens played in 13 regular season games where he had 50 receptions for 605 yards and four touchdowns and was named an East Division All-Star at season's end. He also played in the team's East Final loss to the Tiger-Cats where he had four receptions for 74 yards.

Gittens had a breakout 2022 season in the CFL. He played in all 18 regular season games and finished sixth in the league in receiving yards with 1,101. Gittens caught 81 passes, five of which were for touchdowns, and was named the East Division finalist for Most Outstanding Canadian: BC Lions quarterback Nathan Rourke ended up winning the award.

In 2023, Gittens played in just 10 regular season games where he had 35 receptions for 416 yards and one touchdown. He suffered a hip injury on September 9, 2023, that forced him to miss the remainder of the season.

=== Edmonton Elks ===
On January 15, 2024, Gittens was traded to the Edmonton Elks, along with a 2024 CFL draft pick, in exchange for Jake Ceresna, reuniting him with McLeod Bethel-Thompson, who had signed with the Elks in the offseason. He spent two years with the Elks and became a free agent upon the expiry of his contract on February 10, 2026.

=== Hamilton Tiger-Cats ===
On February 12, 2026, it was announced that Gittens had signed with the Hamilton Tiger-Cats.
