= Tyshon Blackburn =

Canadian gridiron football player (born 2001)

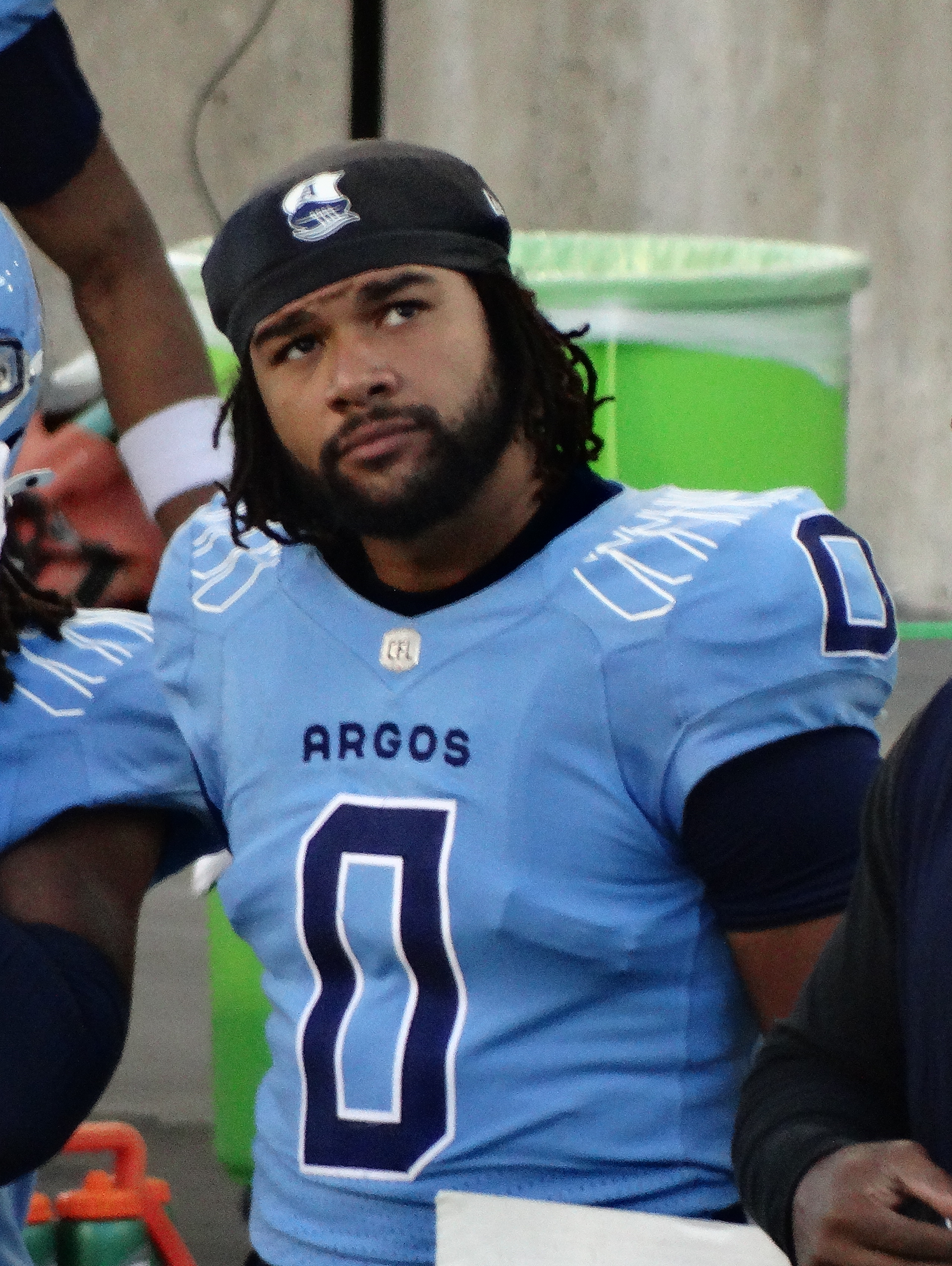
- Blackburn with the Toronto Argonauts in 2024

No. 23 – Edmonton Elks
- Position: Defensive back
- Roster status: Active
- CFL status: National

Personal information
- Born: June 20, 2001 (age 25); Calgary, Alberta, Canada
- Listed height: 6 ft 2 in (1.88 m)
- Listed weight: 203 lb (92 kg)

Career information
- High school: Saint Francis High
- University: Alberta
- CFL draft: 2024: 3rd round, 27th overall pick

Career history
- Toronto Argonauts (2024–2025); Edmonton Elks (2026–present)

Awards and highlights
- 2× Grey Cup champion (2024, 2026); First-team All-Canadian (2021)
- Stats at CFL.ca

Tyshon Blackburn (born June 20, 2001) is a Canadian professional football defensive back for the Edmonton Elks of the Canadian Football League (CFL). He is a Grey Cup champion after winning with the Toronto Argonauts in 2024.

== Early life ==
Blackburn grew up in Calgary where he was raised by his mother who was the reason he started playing football.

== University career ==
Blackburn played U Sports football for the Alberta Golden Bears from 2019 to 2023. He played in 32 games where he had 100 tackles and four interceptions. He was named a U Sports First Team All-Canadian in 2021.

== Professional career ==
Pre-draft measurables
Height	Weight	40-yard dash	20-yard shuttle	Three-cone drill	Vertical jump	Broad jump	Bench press
6 ft 2 1/8 in (1.88 m)	203 lb (92 kg)	4.66 s	4.44 s	6.90 s	33.5 in (0.85 m)	9 ft 10 7/8 in (3.02 m)	2 reps
All values from CFL Combine

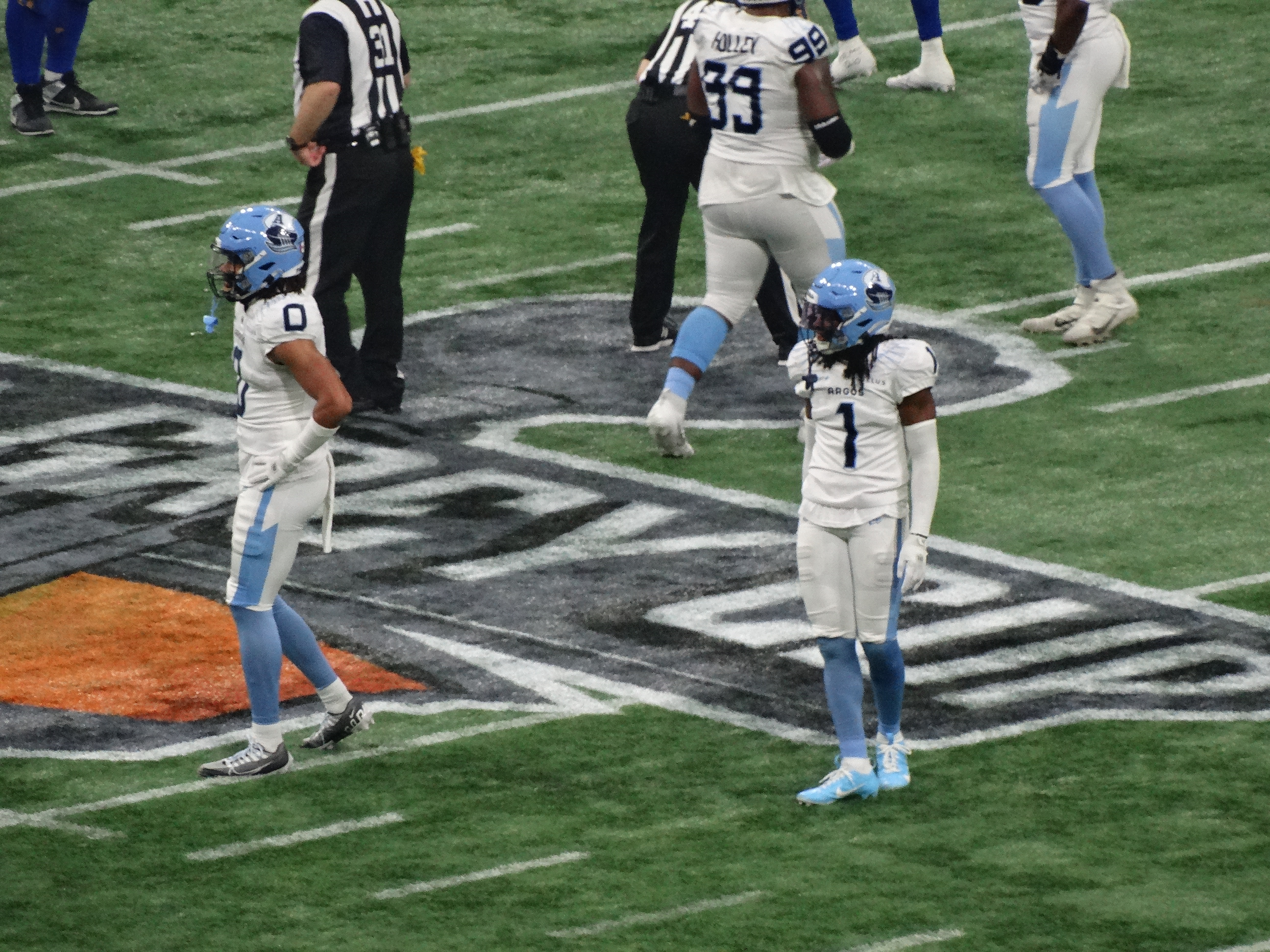
Blackburn (0) with Tunde Adeleke (1) in the 111th Grey Cup.

=== Toronto Argonauts ===
Blackburn was drafted in the third round, 27th overall, by the Toronto Argonauts and signed with the team on May 6, 2024. He made the team's active roster following training camp and played in his first professional game on June 9, 2024, against the BC Lions. He served as a backup defensive back until being demoted to the practice roster for the team's week 16 loss to the Hamilton Tiger-Cats. He returned for the team's next game where he had one defensive tackle and his first career interception in the team's victory over the Montreal Alouettes. With the team having clinched second place, Blackburn earned his first career start in the final regular season game against the Edmonton Elks where he had one defensive tackle.

Blackburn played in the team's East Semi-Final victor over the Ottawa Redblacks, but returned to the practice roster for the East Final. He returned to the active roster to play in his first Grey Cup game where he had one defensive tackle and one special teams tackle in the Argonauts' 41–24 victory over the Winnipeg Blue Bombers in the 111th Grey Cup.

On May 31, 2026, Blackburn was released by the Argonauts as part of final roster cuts.

=== Edmonton Elks ===
On June 2, 2026, it was announced that Blackburn had signed with the Edmonton Elks.
