= Josiah Schakel =

Canadian football player (born 1999)

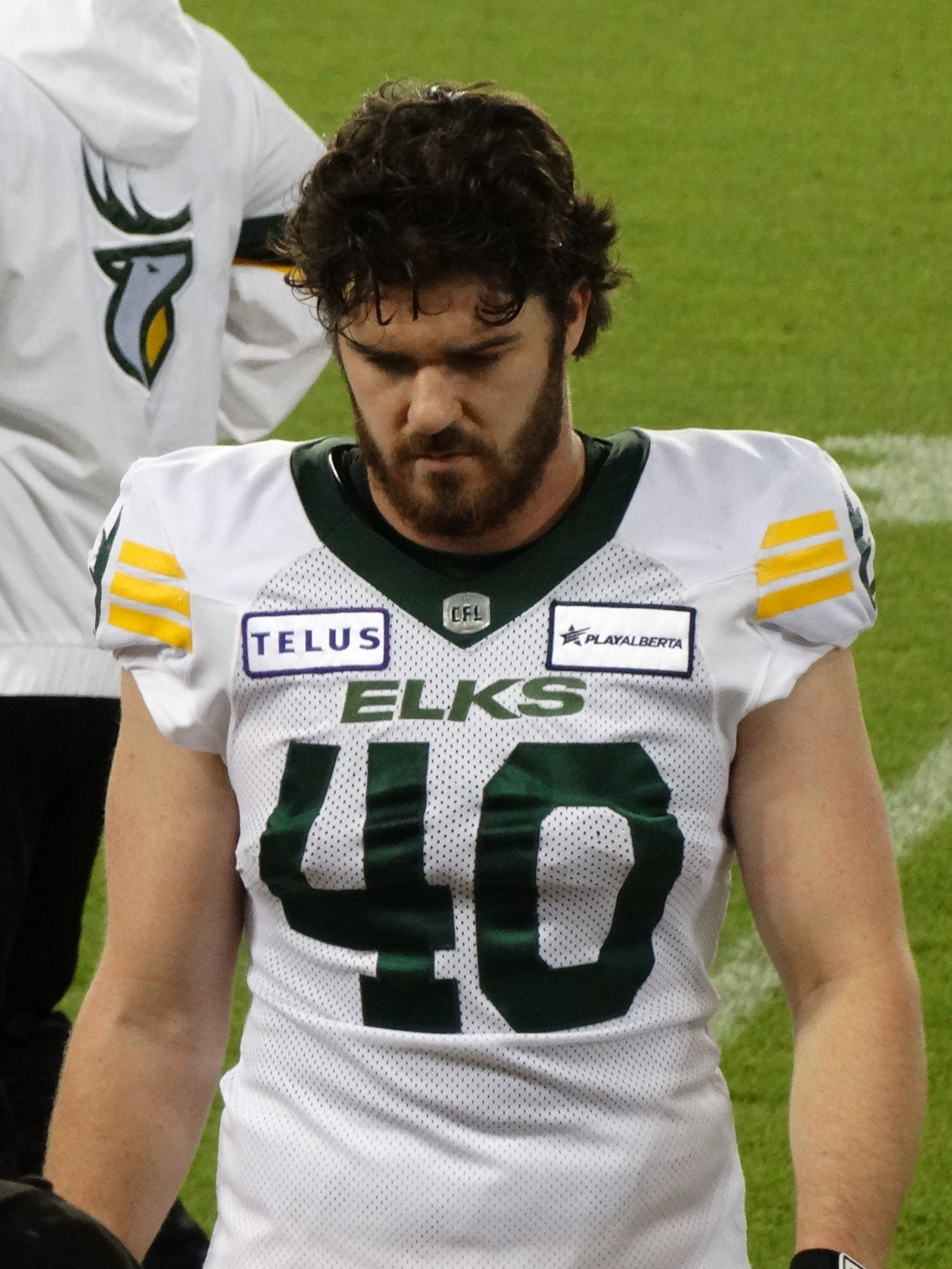
- Schakel with the Edmonton Elks in 2023

No. 27, 40, 41
- Position: Linebacker

Personal information
- Born: January 19, 1999 (age 27); Sherwood Park, Alberta, Canada
- Listed height: 6 ft 1 in (1.85 m)
- Listed weight: 220 lb (100 kg)

Career information
- High school: Ben Facey (Sherwood Park)
- University: Alberta
- CFL draft: 2022: 2nd round, 14th overall pick

Career history
- 2022: Calgary Stampeders
- 2023–2025: Edmonton Elks

Awards and highlights
- Presidents' Trophy (2021)
- Stats at CFL.ca

Josiah Schakel (born January 19, 1999) is a Canadian former professional football linebacker who played in the Canadian Football League (CFL). He played U Sports football at Alberta.

== Early life ==
Schakel played high school football at Bev Facey Community High School in Sherwood Park, Alberta.

== University career ==
Schakel played U Sports football at Alberta. He won the Presidents' Trophy in 2021 as the top U Sports defensive player.

== Professional career ==
Pre-draft measurables
Height	Weight	40-yard dash	20-yard shuttle	Three-cone drill	Vertical jump	Broad jump	Bench press
6 ft 0 3/4 in (1.85 m)	221 lb (100 kg)	4.77 s	4.29 s	6.97 s	32.0 in (0.81 m)	9 ft 5 7/8 in (2.89 m)	18 reps
All values from CFL Combine

Schakel was selected by the Calgary Stampeders of the Canadian Football League (CFL) in the second round, with the 14th overall pick, of the 2022 CFL draft. He signed with the team on May 9, 2022. He was placed on injured reserve several times during the 2022 season. Overall, Schakel dressed in seven games in 2022, and made one tackle on defense. He was released on June 3, 2023.

Schakel was signed to the practice roster of the Edmonton Elks of the CFL on June 26, 2023. He was moved to the active roster on June 28, 2023. He dressed for 15 games in 2023, recording 14 special teams tackles. Schakel re-signed with the team on December 1, 2023. He retired on January 12, 2026.
