= Brock Gowanlock =

Canadian gridiron football player (born 1996)

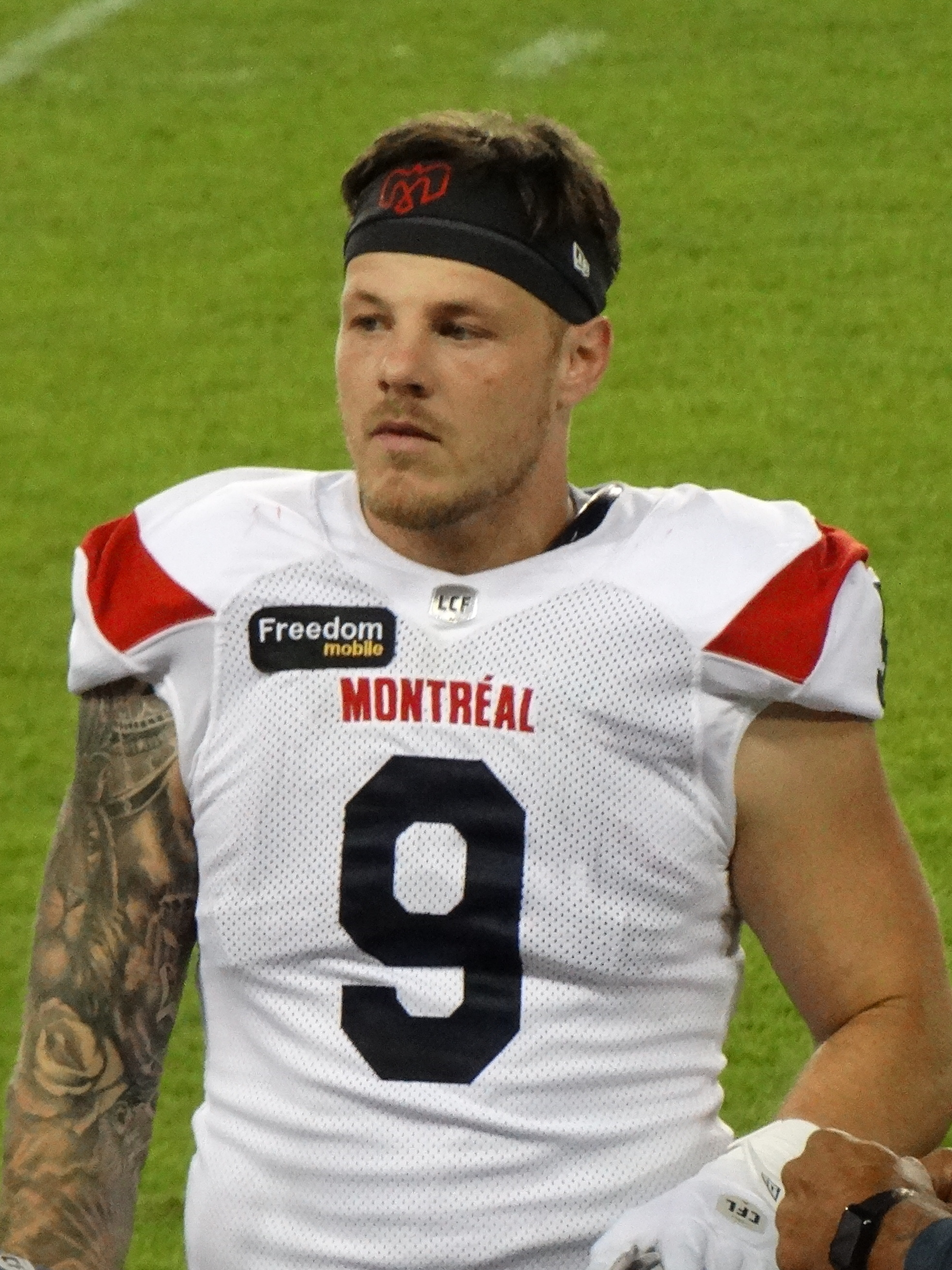
- Gowanlock with the Montreal Alouettes in 2024

Profile
- Positions: Defensive end, fullback

Personal information
- Born: July 11, 1996 (age 30); Duncan, British Columbia, Canada
- Listed height: 6 ft 3 in (1.91 m)
- Listed weight: 240 lb (109 kg)

Career information
- High school: Cowichan Secondary
- CJFL: Langley Rams
- University: Manitoba
- CFL draft: 2020: 8th round, 66th overall pick

Career history
- 2021: Montreal Alouettes*
- 2022–2024: Montreal Alouettes
- 2025: Winnipeg Blue Bombers*
- * Offseason or practice squad member only

Awards and highlights
- Grey Cup champion (2023)
- Stats at CFL.ca

Brock Gowanlock (born July 11, 1996) is a Canadian professional football defensive end and fullback. He was most recently a member of the Winnipeg Blue Bombers of the Canadian Football League (CFL).

== Junior career ==
Gowanlock played for the Langley Rams of the Canadian Junior Football League from 2014 to 2015 as a defensive tackle.

== University career ==
Gowanlock was recruited to play for the Manitoba Bisons of U Sports football, where he played from 2016 to 2021. He played in 38 total games where he had 177 total tackles, 11 sacks, and five forced fumbles.

== Professional career ==
=== Montreal Alouettes ===
Gowanlock was drafted in the eighth round, 66th overall, by the Montreal Alouettes in the 2020 CFL draft. However, he did not play in 2020 due to the cancellation of both the 2020 CFL season and the 2020 U Sports football season. He signed with the team ahead of the 2021 season, but he was released before the season began on July 26, 2021, and he returned to school to complete his playing eligibility.

Gowanlock re-signed with the Alouettes on January 21, 2022. He played in ten games where he had two defensive tackles and five special teams tackles. He also played in both playoff games that year where he had one special teams tackle.

In 2023, Gowanlock played in 10 regular season games and had two defensive tackles, five special teams tackles, and one fumble recovery. In the 2024 season, he played in just three games, sitting out the rest on the injured list, where he had two special teams tackles. He became a free agent upon the expiry of his contract on February 11, 2025.

=== Winnipeg Blue Bombers ===
On February 11, 2025, Gowanlock signed a one-year contract with the Winnipeg Blue Bombers. However, he was released at the opening of training camp on May 10, 2025.
