= Tyrell Ford =

Canadian gridiron football player (born 1998)

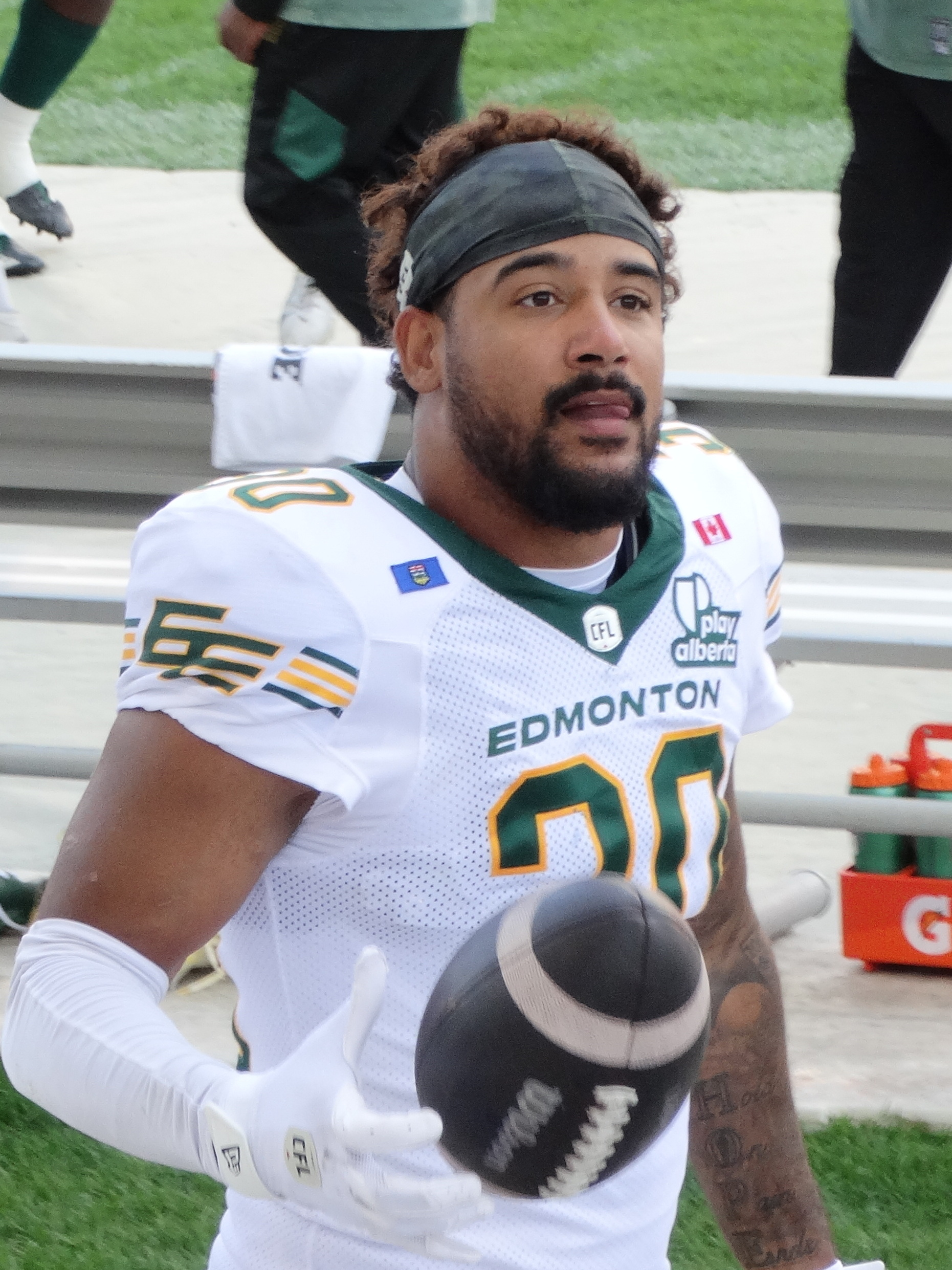
- Ford with the Edmonton Elks in 2025

No. 30 – Edmonton Elks
- Position: Defensive back
- Roster status: Active
- CFL status: National

Personal information
- Born: March 30, 1998 (age 28); Niagara Falls, Ontario, Canada
- Listed height: 6 ft 0 in (1.83 m)
- Listed weight: 200 lb (91 kg)

Career information
- High school: A. N. Myer Secondary (Niagara Falls)
- University: Waterloo
- CFL draft: 2022: 2nd round, 13th overall pick

Career history
- Winnipeg Blue Bombers (2022); Green Bay Packers (2023)*; Winnipeg Blue Bombers (2024); Edmonton Elks (2025–present)
- * Offseason or practice squad member only

Awards and highlights
- Grey Cup champion (2026); CFL All-Star (2024); 2× CFL West All-Star (2024, 2026); 2× Second-team All-Canadian (2019, 2021)

Career CFL statistics as of 2026
- Games played: 71
- Tackles: 186
- Forced fumbles: 1
- Pass deflections: 29
- Interceptions: 16
- Defensive touchdowns: 1
- Stats at CFL.ca

Tyrell Ford (born March 30, 1998) is a Canadian professional football defensive back for the Edmonton Elks of the Canadian Football League (CFL). He played U Sports football for the Waterloo Warriors.

== Early life ==
Playing alongside his twin brother, Tre Ford, at A. N. Myer Secondary School, Ford led the Marauders to a Junior Metrobowl championship in 2013, and three straight OFSAA championships from 2014 to 2016.

== University career ==
Ford played U Sports football for the Waterloo Warriors from 2017 to 2021. Over four seasons, he played in 30 games where he had 94 total tackles, six sacks, 20 pass knockdowns, and six interceptions, including one returned for a touchdown. He was also a kick returner for the team where he had 40 kick returns for 733 yards and 82 punt returns for 1,139 yards and three touchdowns. He was named a U Sports Second Team All-Canadian at cornerback in 2019 and 2021.

== Professional career ==
Pre-draft measurables
Height	Weight	40-yard dash	20-yard shuttle	Three-cone drill	Vertical jump	Broad jump	Bench press
5 ft 10 1/2 in (1.79 m)	188 lb (85 kg)	4.42 s	4.27 s	7.03 s	36.5 in (0.93 m)	10 ft 3 in (3.12 m)	15 reps
All values from CFL Combine

=== Winnipeg Blue Bombers (first stint) ===
Ford was drafted in the second round, 13th overall, by the Winnipeg Blue Bombers in the 2022 CFL draft and signed with the team on May 20, 2022. He made the team's active roster following training camp and played in his first professional game on June 10, 2022, against the Ottawa Redblacks where he had one special teams tackle. In his rookie season he played in all 18 regular season games and contributed with 10 special teams tackles and three defensive tackles. Following the season, he had a workout with the Jacksonville Jaguars (NFL). He was released by the Blue Bombers on January 10, 2023, in order to sign an NFL contract.

=== Green Bay Packers ===
On January 10, 2023, Ford was signed to a reserve/future contract with the Green Bay Packers. He was released on August 29, 2023. Following his release from the Packers, Ford remained unsigned by any team, and did not play in 2023.

=== Winnipeg Blue Bombers (second stint) ===
Ford (30) with the Blue Bombers at the 111th Grey Cup.

On February 20, 2024, Ford re-signed with the Blue Bombers. He played and started in all 18 regular season games where he had 51 defensive tackles, four special teams tackles, 12 pass knockdowns, and seven interceptions. At the end of the 2026 season, he was named a CFL All-Star for the first time in his career. He became a free agent upon the expiration of his contract on February 11, 2025.

=== Edmonton Elks ===
Ford joined the Edmonton Elks through free agency on February 12, 2025. He scored his first professional touchdown on August 8, 2025, against the Montreal Alouettes in a 23–22 victory when he returned an interception 87 yards.

On October 29, 2025, Ford signed an extension with the Elks through the 2027 CFL season after previously being under contract through 2026. The extension was reported to be worth $230,000 in hard money, making him the highest-paid defensive back in the league. He played and started in all 18 regular season games and recorded 56 defensive tackles, one special teams tackle, four pass knockdowns, two interceptions, and one touchdown.

== Personal life ==
Ford is engaged to be married to his fianceé, Kimberly Lynn Weiler. Ford also has a twin brother, Tre, who plays quarterback for the Hamilton Tiger-Cats and also played for the Waterloo Warriors. Ford began playing football when he was six years old when his father, Robert, introduced him to the sport and also served as his coach.
