= 2017 U Sports football season =

- Duration: August 25 – October 28
- Hardy Cup champions: Calgary Dinos
- Yates Cup champions: Western Mustangs
- Dunsmore Cup champions: Laval Rouge et Or
- Loney Bowl champions: Acadia Axemen
- Mitchell Bowl champions: Laval Rouge et Or
- Uteck Bowl champions: Western Mustangs

Vanier Cup
- Date: November 25
- Venue: Hamilton, Ontario
- Champions: Western Mustangs

U Sports football seasons seasons
- 2016 2018

The 2017 U Sports football season began on August 25 with the St. Francis Xavier X-Men visiting the Saint Mary's Huskies in Halifax, Nova Scotia, and the Montreal Carabins visiting the Concordia Stingers in Montreal, Quebec. The season concluded on November 25 with the 53rd Vanier Cup championship at Tim Hortons Field in Hamilton, Ontario. This season saw the first conference shift since 2001 with the Bishop's Gaiters moving from the Quebec Student Sport Federation to the Atlantic University Sport conference. 27 university teams in Canada participated in the newly re-branded U Sports football, the highest level of amateur Canadian football. The Western Mustangs defeated the Laval Rouge et Or, 39–17, to win their first Vanier Cup since 1994.

== Regular season ==
=== Conference changes ===
On December 15, 2016, Bishop's University Athletics and Atlantic University Sport (AUS) announced that the Bishop's Gaiters would be joining the AUS conference beginning in 2017. The move increases the number of teams competing in the AUS from four to five, while reducing the teams in the Quebec Student Sport Federation (RSEQ) from six to five. It also marked the first time since 1990 that the AUS had more than four teams, when the University College of Cape Breton played for one season before disbanding. This change also brought an end to the scheduled interlocking play with the RSEQ that had been in place since 2002.

=== Schedules ===
The schedule for the Ontario University Athletics conference was released on January 18, 2017, with 11 teams playing over the course of nine weeks with each team receiving one bye week. Compared to the previous season, there were no major format changes. The OUA will begin play on August 26, 2017, with the Carleton Ravens visiting the Queen's Gaels at Richardson Memorial Stadium. Eight other OUA teams will play the following day. The regular season will conclude on October 21, 2017, with the Yates Cup championship game taking place three weeks later on November 11, 2017.

On January 23, 2017, the schedule changes for the AUS were revealed, with the conference opening the season two weeks earlier than usual on Friday August 25 with the St. Francis Xavier X-Men visiting the Saint Mary's Huskies. Each team will play the other four teams twice with each team also having two bye weeks over the ten-week schedule. With these changes, the AUS will also now permit teams to play one out-of-conference exhibition game, in lieu of interlock play with the RSEQ being eliminated. There are three Friday night regular season games in the AUS with the remaining 17 games being played on Saturday afternoons. The regular season will conclude on October 28, 2017, and playoff format will remain the same despite an additional team; the second place team will host the third place team in the semi-final and the first place team will host the Loney Bowl championship game on November 11, 2017.

The Quebec Student Sport Federation released their schedule on February 21, 2017. Following the aforementioned departure of Bishop's, the conference's schedule featured five teams for the first time since 2002. Similar to the AUS schedule, the five teams will play eight regular season games over ten weeks with each team receiving two bye weeks. In contrast to the AUS, the RSEQ will have its top four teams qualify for the playoffs with two semi-final games and the winners of those games playing for the Dunsmore Cup on November 11, 2017. This was the same format used when the conference had five teams in 2002. Of the 20 games scheduled, two are on Thursdays, five are on Fridays, 11 are on Saturdays, and two are on Sundays.

With the changes to the other conferences, the Canada West Universities Athletic Association was left as the only conference with an even number of teams and there were no major format changes when the schedule was unveiled on April 18, 2017. All six teams will play on September 1, 2017, and conclude their seasons on October 28, 2017. As usual, all teams will have a bye week on Thanksgiving Day weekend. In total, eight regular season games will be played on Fridays and 16 will be played on Saturdays. Similar to the other conferences, the conference championship game, the Hardy Cup, will be played on November 11, 2017.

=== Cancelled game ===
On October 4, 2017, it was announced that the October 5 game between the Montreal Carabins and Concordia Stingers was cancelled due to Montreal players and coaching staff members exhibiting flu symptoms. Due to scheduling constraints, the game was outright cancelled and would not be rescheduled. Montreal and Concordia would only play sevens games as a result and winning percentage would be counted in the standings as opposed to point totals. If teams are tied in the standings based on win percentage, head-to-head results would be used as a second tie-breaker. The decision was met with controversy as a similar situation in 2006 had the St. Francis Xavier X-Men forfeit a game to the McGill Redmen due to illnesses on their team rather than the game count as a no-decision.

=== Standings ===
2017 AUS standings
Team	W		L	PF		PA	Pts	Ply
#7 Acadia	6	-	2	226	-	193	12	†
#8 Saint Mary's	5	-	3	209	-	149	10	X
St. FX	4	-	4	179	-	168	8	X
Mount Allison	4	-	4	235	-	211	8	
Bishop's	1	-	7	158	-	286	2	
† – Conference Champion; Rankings: U Sports Top 10

2017 OUA standings
Team	W		L	PF		PA	Pts	Ply
#2 Western	8	-	0	386	-	105	16	†
#5 Laurier	6	-	2	308	-	175	12	X
#10 McMaster	6	-	2	209	-	115	12	X
Ottawa	5	-	3	190	-	215	10	X
Guelph	5	-	3	293	-	196	10	X
Queen's	4	-	4	290	-	223	8	X
Waterloo	4	-	4	299	-	339	8	
Carleton	3	-	5	222	-	232	6	
Windsor	1	-	7	142	-	362	2	
York	1	-	7	163	-	340	2	
Toronto	1	-	7	108	-	308	2	
† – Conference Champion; Rankings: U Sports Top 10

2017 RSEQ standings
Team	W		L	PF		PA	Pts	Ply
#1 Laval	7	-	1	266	-	77	14	†
#3 Montréal	6	-	1	176	-	93	12	X
Concordia	3	-	4	181	-	173	6	X
Sherbrooke	2	-	6	139	-	242	4	X
McGill	1	-	7	105	-	282	2	
† – Conference Champion; Rankings: U Sports Top 10 * The October 5 game between Montreal and Concordia was cancelled due to a flu virus.

2017 Canada West standings
Team	W		L	PF		PA	Pts	Ply
#4 Calgary	7	-	1	340	-	224	14	†
#6 British Columbia	6	-	2	231	-	172	12	X
#9 Regina	4	-	4	259	-	283	8	X
Alberta	3	-	5	275	-	276	6	X
Saskatchewan	2	-	6	245	-	250	4	
Manitoba	2	-	6	180	-	289	2	
† – Conference Champion; Rankings: U Sports Top 10

== Post-season awards ==
U Sports post-season awards
	Quebec	Ontario	Atlantic	Canada West	NATIONAL
Hec Crighton Trophy	Hugo Richard (Laval)	Kurleigh Gittens Jr. (Laurier)	Dale Wright (Acadia)	Ed Ilnicki (Alberta)	Ed Ilnicki (Alberta)
Presidents' Trophy	Adam Auclair (Laval)	Jackson Bennett (Ottawa)	Bailey Feltmate (Acadia)	Stavros Katsantonis (British Columbia)	Adam Auclair (Laval)
J. P. Metras Trophy	Mathieu Betts (Laval)	Kene Onyeka (Carleton)	Jadarius Caesar (Saint Mary's)	Mark Korte (Alberta)	Mathieu Betts (Laval)
Peter Gorman Trophy	Kean Harelimana (Laval)	Tre Ford (Waterloo)	Liam Patton (Bishop's)	Nick Cross (Regina)	Tre Ford (Waterloo)^{[A]}
Russ Jackson Award	Joël Houle (McGill)	Nick Vanin (Western)	Brandon Jennings (Acadia)	Ed Ilnicki (Alberta)	Nick Vanin (Western)
Frank Tindall Trophy	Glen Constantin (Laval)	Chris Bertoia (Waterloo)	Jeff Cummins (Acadia)	Wayne Harris Jr. (Calgary)	Jeff Cummins (Acadia)

A. Nick Cross had originally won the Peter Gorman Trophy, but was stripped of the award following a cannabis violation and it was instead awarded to Tre Ford.

=== All-Canadian team ===
==== First team ====
Offence
QB - Noah Picton - Regina
RB - Alex Taylor - Western
RB - Ed Ilnicki - Alberta
IR - Trivell Pinto - British Columbia
IR - Mitch Hillis - Saskatchewan
WR - Kurleigh Gittens Jr. - Laurier
WR - Kaion Julien-Grant - St. Francis Xavier
C - Zach Annen - Carleton
G - Justin Lawrence - Alberta
G - Andrew Pickett - Guelph
T - Mark Korte - Alberta
T - David Brown - Western
Defence
DT - Vincent Desjardins - Laval
DT - Connor Griffiths - British Columbia
DE - Mathieu Betts - Laval
DE - Jadarius Ceasar - Saint Mary's
LB - Adam Auclair - Laval
LB - Nelkas Kwemo - Queen's
LB - Jean-Gabriel Poulin - Western
FS - Stavros Katsantonis - British Columbia
HB - Gabriel Ouellet - Laval
HB - Malcom Lee - British Columbia
CB - Jamie Harry - Ottawa
CB - Godfrey Onyeka - Laurier
Special teams
P - TJ Morton - Toronto
K - Gabriel Ferraro - Guelph
RET - Johnny King - Saint Mary's

==== Second team ====
Offence
QB - Hugo Richard - Laval
RB - Nathan Carter - Carleton
RB - Jean-Guy Rimpel - Concordia
IR - Nathan Rowe - Alberta
IR - Guillaume Paquet - Montreal
WR - Jacob Scarfone - Guelph
WR - Jeremy Sauvageau - McGill
C - Francis Lapointe - Sherbrooke
G - Samuel Thomassin - Laval
G - Ryan Sceviour - Calgary
T - Gustave Sylvestre - Montreal
T - Maurice Simba - Concordia
Defence
DT - Brett Wade - Calgary
DT - Adam Melanson - Acadia
DE - Kene Onyeka - Carleton
DE - Cory Robinson - Calgary
LB - Nick Cross - Regina
LB - Boston Rowe - Calgary
LB - Mickael Côté - Concordia
FS - François Hamel - Montreal
HB - Jackson Bennett - Ottawa
HB - Marc-Antoine Dequoy - Montreal
CB - Will Maxwell - British Columbia
CB - Khadeem Pierre - Concordia
Special teams
P - Félix Ménard-Brière - Montreal
K - Marc Liegghio - Western
RET - Kurleigh Gittens Jr. - Laurier

== Post-season ==
The Vanier Cup is played between the champions of the Mitchell Bowl and the Uteck Bowl, the national semi-final games. In 2017, according to the rotating schedule, the Canada West Hardy Trophy championship team will host the Québec conference Dunsmore Cup championship team for the Mitchell Bowl. The winners of the Atlantic conference's Loney Bowl will host the Yates Cup Ontario championship team for the Uteck Bowl.

=== Conference Playoffs ===
==== Atlantic University Sport ====
November 4 Semi-final			November 14; Loney Bowl
			1	Acadia	45
2	Saint Mary's	16	2	Saint Mary's	38
3	St. Francis Xavier	15

On November 9, 2017, Atlantic University Sport announced that the Saint Mary's team had been disqualified due to an undisclosed eligibility violation, and that the Loney Bowl had been cancelled. The Acadia Axemen were declared conference champions by default. However, Saint Mary's took U Sports governing body to the Ontario Superior Court (where U Sports is headquartered) due to their interpretation of a player eligibility rule. Saint Mary's wide receiver Archelaus Jack had been on the practice roster of the Canadian Football League's Saskatchewan Roughriders until October 11, 2016. The league rules state that if a player is on a professional team's roster past August 15, that player would have to sit out one year. The rules were not clear on whether this referred to an academic year or season, or a 365-day period.

On November 12, one day after the game was originally scheduled, the Ontario judge ruled in favour of Saint Mary's and the Loney Bowl was rescheduled for November 14, with the Uteck Bowl still scheduled for the following Saturday, November 18, against the Western Mustangs. Acadia won the game in overtime 45–38.

==== Réseau du sport étudiant du Québec ====
November 4 Semi-finals
1	Laval	45
4	Sherbrooke	0
2	Montreal	42
3	Concordia	20

November 11; Dunsmore Cup
1	Laval	25
2	Montreal	22

==== Ontario University Athletics ====
October 28; Quarter-finals
4	Ottawa	8
5	Guelph	30
3	McMaster	12
6	Queen's	9

November 4 Semi-finals
1	Western	66
5	Guelph	12
2	Laurier	19
3	McMaster	6

November 11; 110th Yates Cup
1	Western	75
2	Laurier	32

==== Canada West Universities Athletic Association ====
November 4 Semi-finals
1	Calgary	39
4	Alberta	22
2	UBC	28
3	Regina	21

November 11; 81st Hardy Trophy
1	Calgary	44
2	UBC	43

=== National Semifinals ===
Uteck Bowl

Quarter	1	2	3	4	Total
Western	28	29	10	14	81
Acadia	0	0	0	3	3

at Raymond Field (Wolfville, Nova Scotia)

- Date: November 18
- Game time: 2:00 p.m. AST
- Game weather: 3 °C (37 °F)
- Game attendance: 2,815
- Referee: Al Gates
- TV: Sportsnet 360, TVA Sports
- Box Score

Game information
- 1 - 12:37 Western – Brett Ellerman 23 yd pass from Chris Merchant (Marc Liegghio kick) Drive: 6 plays, 79 yards in 2:23
- 1 - 9:19 Western – Cedric Joseph 4 yd run (Marc Liegghio kick) Drive: 4 plays, 37 yards in 1:51
- 1 - 4:26 Western – Cedric Joseph 8 yd run (Marc Liegghio kick) Drive: 7 plays, 62 yards in 2:31
- 1 - 1:35 Western – Chris Merchant 14 yd run (Marc Liegghio kick) Drive: 3 plays, 37 yards in 1:16
- 2 - 13:47 Western – Cedric Joseph 3 yd run (Marc Liegghio kick) Drive: 3 plays, 24 yards in 1:13
- 2 - 12:03 Western – Harry McMaster 73 yd pass from Chris Merchant (Marc Liegghio kick) Drive: 2 plays, 73 yards in 0:39
- 2 - 5:46 Western – Yannick Harou 5 yd run (Marc Liegghio kick) Drive: 9 plays, 66 yards in 3:43
- 2 - 1:37 Western – Chris Merchant 7 yd run (2pt conversion rush by Harry McMaster) Drive: 7 plays, 71 yards in 2:54
- 3 - 7:28 Western – Trey Humes 6 yd run (Marc Liegghio kick) Drive: 6 plays, 77 yards in 2:25
- 3 - 3:29 Western – Marc Liegghio 20 yd field goal Drive: 3 plays, 3 yards in 1:23
- 4 - 9:11 Western – M. Ferguson 30 yd interception return (Marc Liegghio kick)
- 4 - 6:54 Acadia – Jarett Saumure 27 yd field goal Drive: 5 plays, 50 yards in 2:17
- 4 - 4:51 Western – Yannick Harou 2 yd run (Marc Liegghio kick) Drive: 4 plays, 75 yards in 2:03

Passing

- Western - Merchant - 10/11, 200
- Acadia - Cluett - 15/25, 181

Rushing

- Western - Humes - 15-172
- Acadia - McDonald - 15-29

Passing

- Western - McMaster - 5-135
- Acadia - McMinns - 3-48

Mitchell Bowl

Quarter	1	2	3	4	Total
Laval	0	10	10	15	35
Calgary	3	14	1	5	23

at McMahon Stadium (Calgary)

- Date: November 18
- Game time: 2:00 p.m. MST
- Game attendance: 1,845
- Referee: R. Isbister
- TV: Sportsnet 360, TVA Sports
- Box Score

Game information
- 1 - 7:49 Calgary - Niko DiFonte 27 yd field goal Drive: 9 plays, 66 yards in 3:02
- 2 - 11:36 Calgary - Josiah Joseph 1 yd run (Niko DiFonte kick) Drive: 9 plays, 75 yards in 3:24
- 2 - 6:35 Laval - David Cote 9 yd field goal Drive: 6 plays, 46 yards in 2:10
- 2 - 5:08 Laval - J Breton Robert 54 yd pass from Hugo Richard (David Cote kick) Drive: 1 plays, 54 yards in 0:12
- 2 - 0:35 Calgary - Jeshrun Antwi 9 yd run (Niko DiFonte kick) Drive: 6 plays, 63 yards in 0:43
- 3 - 14:58 Calgary - Niko DiFonte single
- 3 - 13:23 Laval - David Cote 46 yd field goal Drive: 5 plays, 36 yards in 1:35
- 3 - 9:18 Laval - Simon Gingras-G 2 yd pass from Hugo Richard (David Cote kick) Drive: 7 plays, 64 yards in 2:33
- 4 - 14:35 Laval - Gabriel Ouellet 42 yd fumble return (David Cote kick)
- 4 - 11:25 Calgary - Team safety
- 4 - 6:00 Laval - Dom. Levesque single
- 4 - 3:03 Calgary - Niko DiFonte 47 yd field goal Drive: 7 plays, 35 yards in 2:57
- 4 - 0:29 Laval - V Alarie-Tardif 3 yd run (David Cote kick) Drive: 1 plays, 3 yards in 0:04

Passing

- Laval - Richard - 21/32, 258
- Calgary - Sinagra - 26/43, 318

Rushing

- Laval - Alarie-Tardiff - 15-76
- Calgary - Sinagra - 3-50

Receiving

- Laval - Breton-Robert - 7-109
- Calgary - Karl - 9-134

=== National Championship ===
53rd Vanier Cup

Quarter	1	2	3	4	Total
Laval	0	7	3	7	17
Western	8	8	9	14	39

at Tim Hortons Field (Hamilton, Ontario)

- Date: November 25
- Game time: 1:00 p.m. EST
- Game weather: 9 °C (48 °F)
- Game attendance: 10,754
- Referee: G. MacLean
- TV: Sportsnet, TVA Sports
- Box Score

Game information
- 1 11:28 Western - Chris Merchant 13 yd run (Marc Liegghio kick) Drive: 8 plays, 84 yards in 3:32
- 1 1:45 Western - Marc Liegghio single
- 2 5:49 Western - Cedric Joseph 12 yd run (Marc Liegghio kick) Drive: 9 plays, 82 yards in 3:28
- 2 2:14 Laval - Benoit Gagnon-B 28 yd pass from Hugo Richard (David Cote kick) Drive: 9 plays, 78 yards in 3:30
- 2 0:00 Western - Marc Liegghio single
- 3 11:08 Western - Cedric Joseph 6 yd run (Marc Liegghio kick) Drive: 6 plays, 54 yards in 2:13
- 3 7:00 Western - Safety
- 3 1:53 Laval - David Cote 34 yd field goal Drive: 9 plays, 58 yards in 3:29
- 4 14:08 Western - Cole Majoros 32 yd pass from Chris Merchant (Marc Liegghio kick) Drive: 7 plays, 75 yards in 2:45
- 4 7:08 Western - Chris Merchant 10 yd run (Marc Liegghio kick) Drive: 10 plays, 73 yards in 4:54
- 4 00:07 Laval - Vincent Alarie-Tardif 1 yd run (David Cote kick) Drive: 6 plays, 67 yards in 1:20

Passing

- Laval - Hugo Richard 21/35, 235
- Western - Chris Merchant 13/20, 276

Rushing

- Laval - Vincent Alarie-Tardif 5-35
- Western - Alex Taylor 26-150

Receiving

- Laval - Jonathan Breton-Robert 7-49
- Western - Harry McMaster 5-115
