= 2025 Winnipeg Blue Bombers season =

CFL team season

- General manager: Kyle Walters
- President: Wade Miller
- Head coach: Mike O'Shea
- Home stadium: Princess Auto Stadium

Results
- Record: 10–8
- Division place: 4th, West
- Playoffs: Lost East Semi-Final
- Team MOP: Brady Oliveira
- Team MODP: Evan Holm
- Team MOC: Brady Oliveira
- Team MOOL: Stanley Bryant
- Team MOST: Trey Vaval
- Team MOR: Trey Vaval

Uniform
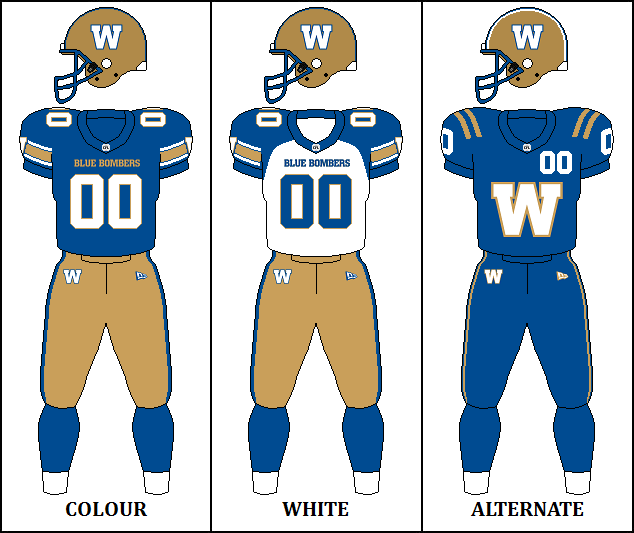

The 2025 Winnipeg Blue Bombers season was the team's 67th season in the Canadian Football League (CFL) and their 92nd season overall. The Blue Bombers qualified for the playoffs for the ninth consecutive season following an Edmonton Elks loss to the BC Lions in week 20. However, the Blue Bombers were unable to play in the Grey Cup that was being hosted by Winnipeg as the team lost the East Semi-Final to the Montreal Alouettes by a score of 42–33.

The 2025 CFL season was the 11th season under head coach Mike O'Shea and the 11th full season under general manager Kyle Walters.

This was the first sold-out regular season in franchise history, with attendances of 32,343 at each of the 9 home games.

== Offseason ==
=== CFL global draft ===
The 2025 CFL global draft took place on April 29, 2025. The Blue Bombers had two selections in the draft, including the second overall pick after trading Kyle Samson to the Hamilton Tiger-Cats.

Round	Pick	Player	Position	School	Nationality
1	2	Kemari Munier-Bailey	DL	Weber State	United Kingdom
2	17	James Evans	P	Indiana	New Zealand

== CFL national draft ==
The 2025 CFL draft took place on April 29, 2025. The Blue Bombers had nine selections in the eight-round draft. Not including traded picks or forfeitures, the team selected eighth in each round of the draft by virtue of losing the 111th Grey Cup game.

Round	Pick	Player	Position	School	Hometown
1	6	Connor Shay	LB	Wyoming	Danville, CA, USA
2	15	Jaylen Smith	DB	North Texas	Hamilton, ON
2	18	Taylor Elgersma	QB	Wilfrid Laurier	London, ON
3	27	Ethan Vibert	OL	South Dakota State	Regina, SK
5	39	Joey Corcoran	WR	New Hampshire	Pierrefonds, QC
5	45	Lane Novak	LB	Saskatchewan	Saskatoon, SK
6	54	Ethan Ball	DB	Calgary	Regina, SK
7	63	Trey Laing	DL	Eastern Michigan	Tallahassee, FL, USA
8	71	Iwinosa Uwubanmwen	OL	Alberta	Calgary, AB

== Preseason ==
=== Schedule ===
Week	Game	Date	Kickoff	Opponent	Results		TV	Venue	Attendance	Summary
Week	Game	Date	Kickoff	Opponent	Score	Record	TV	Venue	Attendance	Summary
A	Bye									
B	1	Sat, May 24	3:00 p.m. CDT	vs. Saskatchewan Roughriders	W 15–9	1–0	CFL+	Princess Auto Stadium	27,913	Recap
C	2	Fri, May 30	8:00 p.m. CDT	at Saskatchewan Roughriders	W 27–20	2–0	CFL+	Mosaic Stadium	26,293	Recap

== Regular season ==
=== Standings ===
West Division
Team	GP	W	L	T	Pts	PF	PA	Div	Stk	
Saskatchewan Roughriders	18	12	6	0	24	472	409	5–5	L2	Details
BC Lions	18	11	7	0	22	559	499	6–4	W6	Details
Calgary Stampeders	18	11	7	0	22	488	416	7–3	W3	Details
Winnipeg Blue Bombers	18	10	8	0	20	459	424	4–6	W2	Details
Edmonton Elks	18	7	11	0	14	422	490	3–7	L2	Details

=== Schedule ===
Week	Game	Date	Kickoff	Opponent	Results		TV	Venue	Attendance	Summary
Week	Game	Date	Kickoff	Opponent	Score	Record	TV	Venue	Attendance	Summary
1	Bye									
2	1	Thu, June 12	7:30 p.m. CDT	vs. BC Lions	W 34–20	1–0	TSN/RDS/CBSSN	Princess Auto Stadium	32,343	Recap
3	2	Sat, June 21	6:00 p.m. CDT	at BC Lions	W 27–14	2–0	TSN/CTV/CBSSN	BC Place	20,138	Recap
4	3	Thu, June 26	7:30 p.m. CDT	vs. Edmonton Elks	W 36–23	3–0	TSN/RDS/CBSSN	Princess Auto Stadium	32,343	Recap
5	4	Thu, July 3	8:00 p.m. CDT	at Calgary Stampeders	L 16–37	3–1	TSN/CBSSN	McMahon Stadium	22,485	Recap
6	Bye									
7	5	Fri, July 18	7:30 p.m. CDT	vs. Calgary Stampeders	L 20–41	3–2	TSN/RDS/CBSSN	Princess Auto Stadium	32,343	Recap
8	6	Sat, July 26	6:00 p.m. CDT	at Toronto Argonauts	L 17–31	3–3	TSN/CTV/CBSSN	BMO Field	13,266	Recap
9	7	Fri, Aug 1	7:30 p.m. CDT	vs. Toronto Argonauts	W 40–31	4–3	TSN	Princess Auto Stadium	32,343	Recap
10	8	Sat, Aug 9	6:00 p.m. CDT	at Calgary Stampeders	L 27–28	4–4	TSN/CBSSN	McMahon Stadium	20,902	Recap
11	9	Thu, Aug 14	7:30 p.m. CDT	vs. Ottawa Redblacks	W 30–27	5–4	TSN/RDS/CBSSN	Princess Auto Stadium	32,343	Recap
12	10	Thu, Aug 21	6:30 p.m. CDT	at Montreal Alouettes	W 26–13	6–4	TSN/RDS/CBSSN	Molson Stadium	20,310	Recap
13	11	Sun, Aug 31	6:00 p.m. CDT	at Saskatchewan Roughriders	L 30–34	6–5	TSN/CBSSN	Mosaic Stadium	34,243	Recap
14	12	Sat, Sept 6	3:00 p.m. CDT	vs. Saskatchewan Roughriders	L 13–21	6–6	TSN	Princess Auto Stadium	32,343	Recap
15	13	Fri, Sep 12	6:00 p.m. CDT	at Hamilton Tiger-Cats	L 21–32	6–7	TSN/CBSSN	Tim Hortons Field	22,913	Recap
16	14	Sat, Sept 20	2:00 p.m. CDT	at Ottawa Redblacks	W 26–18	7–7	TSN/CTV/RDS	TD Place Stadium	20,033	Recap
17	15	Sat, Sept 27	2:00 p.m. CDT	vs. Hamilton Tiger-Cats	W 40–3	8–7	TSN/CTV	Princess Auto Stadium	32,343	Recap
18	Bye									
19	16	Sat, Oct 11	6:00 p.m. CDT	at Edmonton Elks	L 20–25	8–8	TSN	Commonwealth Stadium	15,013	Recap
20	17	Fri, Oct 17	7:00 p.m. CDT	vs. Saskatchewan Roughriders	W 17–16	9–8	TSN	Princess Auto Stadium	32,343	Recap
21	18	Sat, Oct 25	2:00 p.m. CDT	vs. Montreal Alouettes	W 19–10	10–8	TSN/CTV/RDS	Princess Auto Stadium	32,343	Recap

== Post-season ==
=== Schedule ===
Game	Date	Kickoff	Opponent	Results		TV	Venue	Attendance	Summary
Game	Date	Kickoff	Opponent	Score	Record	TV	Venue	Attendance	Summary
East Semi-Final	Sat, Nov 1	1:00 p.m. CDT	at Montreal Alouettes	L 33–42	0–1	TSN/RDS	Molson Stadium	19,785	Recap

== Roster ==
2025 Winnipeg Blue Bombers final roster
**Quarterbacks**: 12 Chase Artopoeus; 8 Zach Collaros; 3 Terry Wilson; **Running backs**: 25 Michael Chris-Ike; 20 Brady Oliveira; 22 Matthew Peterson; **Receivers**: 86 Kevens Clercius; 82 Gavin Cobb; 81 Joey Corcoran; 89 Jerreth Sterns; 88 Keric Wheatfall; 80 Ontaria Wilson	**Offensive linemen**: 66 Stanley Bryant T; 65 Asotui Eli G/C; 67 Chris Kolankowski C; 53 Patrick Neufeld G; 69 Kendall Randolph T; 61 Gabe Wallace G; **Defensive linemen**: 5 Willie Jefferson DE; 99 Cameron Lawson DT; 45 Kemari Munier-Bailey DE; 95 Jake Thomas DT; 93 James Vaughters DE; 91 Jamal Woods DT; **Special teams**: 14 Sergio Castillo K; 42 Ian Leroux LS; 18 Jamieson Sheahan P	**Linebackers**: 49 Michael Ayers; 47 Tanner Cadwallader; 44 Shayne Gauthier; 33 Tony Jones; 34 Connor Shay; 39 Jaylen Smith; 19 Kyrie Wilson; 26 Jaiden Woodbey; **Defensive backs**: 0 Cam Allen; 29 Ethan Ball; 21 Nick Hallett; 31 Evan Holm; 9 Demerio Houston; 6 Redha Kramdi; 27 Dexter Lawson; 1 Deatrick Nichols; 7 Jamal Parker; 23 Trey Vaval	**Practice roster**: 94 Devin Adams DT; -- De'Shaan Dixon DE; -- Ben Dooley G; 87 Abdul-Karim Gassama WR; -- Matthew Jackson DB; 97 Collin Kornelson DT; 64 Justin Mayers G; 38 Jay Person DE; 58 Hunter Poncius T; 50 Fabian Weitz LB; **Suspended list**: Braxton Burmeister WR; James Campbell DB; Javaris Davis DB; Antonio Garcia T; Rashaan Gaulden DB; Kenny Randall DT	**Injured list**: 24 Terrell Bonds DB; 2 Kody Case SB; 10 Nic Demski SB; 15 Cameron Echols-Luper WR; 32 Michael Griffin DB; 56 Matt Jaworski DE; 54 Kydran Jenkins DE; 16 Jake Kelly DB; 55 Eric Lofton T; 4 Peyton Logan RB; 43 Enock Makonzo DB; 13 Dillon Mitchell SB; 48 Lane Novak LB; 22 Matthew Peterson RB; 96 Tanner Schmekel DT; 83 Dalton Schoen SB; 17 Chris Streveler QB; 37 Ridge Texada DB; 68 Micah Vanterpool G; 62 Ethan Vibert G; 41 Major Williams DB
Italics indicate American player • **Bold** indicates Global player

== Coaching staff ==
Winnipeg Blue Bombers staff
Front office: Owner – Winnipeg Football Club; Chairperson of the Board of Governors – Dayna Spiring; President/CEO – Wade Miller; General Manager of Football Operations – Kyle Walters; Assistant General Manager / Director of U.S. Scouting – Danny McManus; Senior Director of Player Personnel — Jim Jauch; Senior Director of Player Personnel — Eric Deslauriers; Senior Director of Player Personnel — Brock Sunderland; Director of Football Operations – Matt Gulakow; Equipment Staff: Head Equipment Manager – Brad Fotty; Assistant Equipment Manager – Kevin Todd	Head Coaches: Head Coach – Mike O'Shea; Offensive coaches: Offensive Coordinator – Jason Hogan; Quarterbacks – Jarious Jackson; Receivers – Billy Jean; Running Backs – André Bolduc; Offensive Line – Marty Costello; Defensive coaches: Defensive Coordinator – Jordan Younger; Defensive Line – Darrell Patterson; Pass Game Analyst and Linebackers – James Stanley; Defensive Assistant – Richie Hall; Special teams coaches: Special Teams Coordinator – Mike Miller; Video Coaches: Video Coordinator – Evan Best; → Coaching staff
