= Domenico Piazza =

Canadian gridiron football player (born 2000)

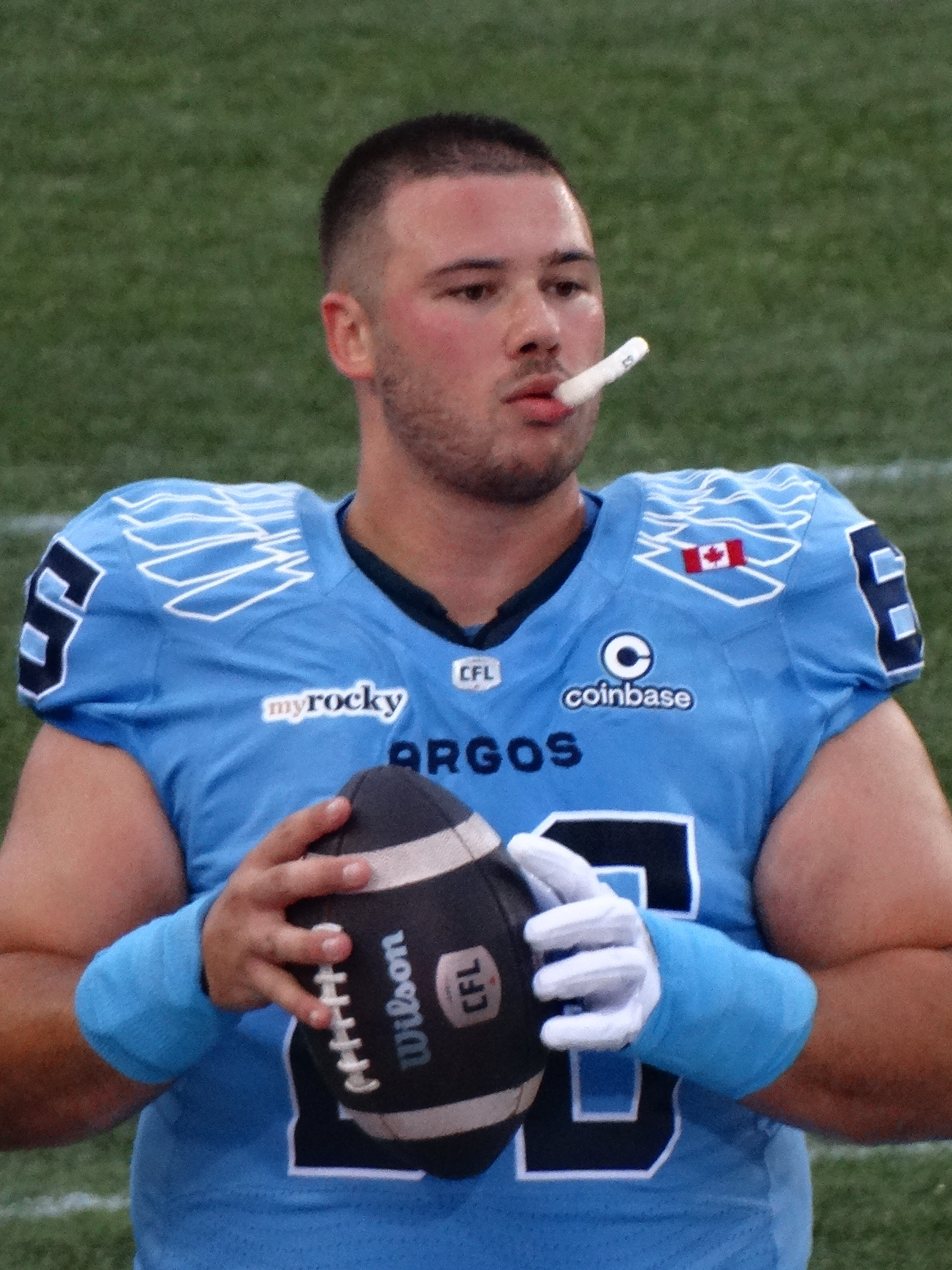
- Piazza with the Toronto Argonauts in 2026

No. 66 – Toronto Argonauts
- Position: Offensive lineman
- Roster status: Active
- CFL status: National

Personal information
- Born: May 29, 2000 (age 26); Mercier, Quebec, Canada
- Listed height: 6 ft 2 in (1.88 m)
- Listed weight: 298 lb (135 kg)

Career information
- CEGEP: John Abbott College
- University: McGill
- CFL draft: 2025: 5th round, 40th overall pick

Career history
- 2025: Edmonton Elks*
- 2026: Edmonton Elks*
- 2026–present: Toronto Argonauts
- * Offseason or practice squad member only

Awards and highlights
- First-team All-Canadian (2025); Second-team All-Canadian (2024)
- Stats at CFL.ca

Domenico Piazza (born May 29, 2000) is a Canadian professional football offensive lineman for the Toronto Argonauts of the Canadian Football League (CFL).

== University career ==
Piazza played U Sports football for the McGill Redbirds. During his U Sports career, he played in 40 games and was named Second-team All-Canadian in 2024 and First-team All-Canadian in 2025.

== Professional career ==
=== Edmonton Elks ===
Piazza was selected by the Edmonton Elks in the fifth round, 40th overall, in the 2025 CFL draft and signed with the team on May 5, 2025. He spent training camp with the team and was released on May 31, 2025, and returned to play for McGill.

On December 22, 2025, Piazza re-signed with the Elks. He again spent training camp with the team but was part of the final cuts on May 31, 2026.

=== Toronto Argonauts ===
Piazza was signed by the Toronto Argonauts on June 4, 2026. He soon after made his professional debut on June 12, 2026, against the Montreal Alouettes as a backup offensive lineman. He later made his first professional start at centre on July 2, 2026, against the Calgary Stampeders.
