= Matthew Stokman =

Canadian gridiron football player (born 2001)

No. 59 – Calgary Stampeders
- Position: Offensive lineman
- Roster status: Active
- CFL status: National

Personal information
- Born: June 25, 2001 (age 25)
- Listed height: 6 ft 3 in (1.91 m)
- Listed weight: 340 lb (154 kg)

Career information
- High school: Vincent Massey Collegiate (Winnipeg, Manitoba)
- University: Manitoba (2019–2025)
- CFL draft: 2025: 7th round, 56th overall pick

Career history
- Calgary Stampeders (2025–present)

Awards and highlights
- First-team All-Canadian (2025); Canada West All-Star (2025)

Career CFL statistics as of 2026
- Games played: 1
- Stats at CFL.ca

Matthew Stokman (born June 25, 2001) is a Canadian professional football offensive lineman for the Calgary Stampeders of the Canadian Football League (CFL). He played U Sports football for the Manitoba Bisons.

== Early life ==
Stokman was born on June 25, 2001, and attended Institut collegial Vincent Massey Collegiate in Winnipeg, Manitoba.

== University career ==
Stokman played U Sports football for the Manitoba Bisons from 2019 to 2025. He played in 44 games and started in 34, with 32 at right guard. In 2025, Stokman was named a Canada West All-Star and first-team All-Canadian.

== Professional career ==
Pre-draft measurables
Height	Weight	40-yard dash	20-yard shuttle	Three-cone drill	Vertical jump	Broad jump	Bench press
6 ft 3 1/2 in (1.92 m)	334 lb (151 kg)	5.40 s	4.82 s	8.19 s	21 in (0.53 m)	8 ft 2 1/8 in (2.49 m)	24 reps
All values from CFL Combine

Stokman was selected by the Calgary Stampeders with the 56th overall pick in the seventh round of the 2025 CFL draft. On May 31, he was placed on the retired list to complete his final year of eligibility at the University of Manitoba. On August 8, Stokman was released. On November 27, he was re-signed by the Stampeders. On May 31, 2026, Stokman was assigned to the practice roster. On October 16, he was elevated to the active roster for the final game against the BC Lions.
