= Ethan Jordan =

Canadian gridiron football player (born 2002)

Ottawa Redblacks
- Position: Wide receiver
- Roster status: Active
- CFL status: National

Personal information
- Born: July 18, 2002 (age 24); Chatham-Kent, Ontario, Canada
- Listed height: 5 ft 10 in (1.78 m)
- Listed weight: 177 lb (80 kg)

Career information
- University: Wilfrid Laurier
- CFL draft: 2025: 6th round, 51st overall pick

Career history
- 2025: Ottawa Redblacks*
- 2026–present: Ottawa Redblacks
- * Offseason or practice squad member only

Awards and highlights
- Hec Crighton Trophy (2025); 3× First-team All-Canadian (2023, 2024, 2025); Second-team All-Canadian (2022)
- Stats at CFL.ca

Ethan Jordan (born July 18, 2002) is a Canadian professional football wide receiver for the Ottawa Redblacks of the Canadian Football League (CFL). He was awarded the Hec Crighton Trophy in 2025 as U Sports football's most outstanding player.

== University career ==
Jordan played for the Wilfrid Laurier Golden Hawks of U Sports football from 2021 to 2025. He originally joined the program in 2020, but did not play that year due to the cancellation of the 2020 U Sports season. In 2021, Jordan dressed in six games where he had one kick return for six yards.

Jordan had a breakout season in 2022 where he played in all eight regular season games and recorded 52 receptions for 643 yards and five touchdowns. He was also featured on special teams as he had two kick returns for 38 yards and 14 punt returns for 108 yards. At the end of the year, he was named a U Sports second-team All-Canadian.

In 2023, Jordan again played in eight regular season games where he had 60 catches for 749 yards and five touchdowns. He was then named a U Sports first-team All-Canadian for the first time in his career. In the OUA playoffs, he played in three games where he had 21 catches for 316 yards and four touchdowns and 11 punt returns for 143 yards, but the Golden Hawks lost the Yates Cup to the Western Mustangs.

In the 2024 season, Jordan had 59 catches for exactly 1,000 yards and ten touchdowns, including a career-high 225 yards in the final regular season game against Carleton Ravens. He became the first receiver in Laurier history to eclipse 1,000 yards and broke the single season record for most receiving yards, previously held by Kurleigh Gittens Jr. with 953 yards in 2017. He also became the 18th receiver in U Sports history to pass the 1,000-yard plateau. He was again named a first-team All-Canadian at season's end. Jordan played in four post-season games, included the Yates Cup championship victory over the Western Mustangs where he had two catches for 30 yards and one touchdown. His best performance came in the 59th Vanier Cup where he had 11 receptions for 179 yards in the 22–17 loss to the Laval Rouge et Or.

In his final year of eligibility in 2025, Jordan played in eight games and had a career-high 67 receptions for 1,061 yards and ten touchdowns to lead the nation in receiving for the second straight year. However, he suffered a season-ending wrist injury in the last game of the season against the Western Mustangs and could not play in the playoffs. He set the all-time record for most career catches in an OUA career with 239 and finished second in receiving yards with 3,450 and second in receiving touchdowns with 30. At the end of the season, Jordan was named a first-team All-Canadian for the third time in his career and won the Hec Crighton Trophy as the top U Sports football player in the country.

== Professional career ==
Pre-draft measurables
| Height | Weight | Arm length | Hand span | Wingspan | 40-yard dash | 20-yard shuttle | Three-cone drill | Vertical jump |
|---|---|---|---|---|---|---|---|---|
| 5 ft 10 1/2 in (1.79 m) | 177 lb (80 kg) | 31 3/8 in (0.80 m) | 8 5/8 in (0.22 m) | 6 ft 1 5/8 in (1.87 m) | 4.44 s | 4.28 s | 7.03 s | 32.0 in (0.81 m) |
All values from CFL Combine/Pro Day

Jordan was drafted in the sixth round, 51st overall, in the 2025 CFL draft by the Ottawa Redblacks of the Canadian Football League (CFL) and signed with the team on May 8, 2025. He attended training camp with the team and accepted a practice roster spot to begin the 2025 season. However, he was later released on June 17, 2025, and returned to Wilfrid Laurier for his final year of eligibility. Jordan re-signed with the Redblacks on November 24, 2025.
