= Kaseem Ferdinand =

Canadian gridiron football player (born 2001)

- Ferdinand with the Montreal Alouettes in 2026

No. 82 – Montreal Alouettes
- Position: Wide receiver
- Roster status: Active
- CFL status: National

Personal information
- Born: October 1, 2001 (age 25)
- Listed height: 5 ft 10 in (1.78 m)
- Listed weight: 184 lb (83 kg)

Career information
- High school: A. Y. Jackson (Toronto, Ontario, Canada)
- University: Carleton (2021–2024)
- CFL draft: 2025: undrafted

Career history
- Montreal Alouettes (2025–present)

Awards and highlights
- 2× Second-team All-Canadian (2023, 2024)
- Stats at CFL.ca

Kaseem Ferdinand (born October 1, 2002) is a Canadian professional football wide receiver for the Montreal Alouettes of the Canadian Football League (CFL). He played U Sports football for the Carleton Ravens.

== U Sports career ==
Ferdinand played U Sports football for the Carleton Ravens from 2021 to 2024. He played in 29 games, catching 147 passes for 1,836 yards and 18 touchdowns. Ferdinand also threw a touchdown in his junior year to Ben Huckabone in a loss to the Western Mustangs.

== Professional career ==
Pre-draft measurables
Height	Weight	40-yard dash	20-yard shuttle	Three-cone drill	Vertical jump	Broad jump	Bench press
5 ft 9 1/2 in (1.77 m)	180 lb (82 kg)	4.68 s	4.35 s	7.21 s	32.5 in (0.83 m)	10 ft 0.5 in (3.06 m)	8 reps
All values from CFL Combine

After not being selected in the 2025 CFL draft, Ferdinand signed with the Montreal Alouettes of the Canadian Football League (CFL). He made his professional debut on August 16, 2025, against the BC Lions. Ferdinand dressed for four games his first season, recording no statistics. He was released on November 17.

On June 8, 2026, Ferdinand re-signed to the practice roster. He was elevated to the active roster on June 18. On July 18, Ferdinand scored a go-ahead (and ultimately game-winning) touchdown on a pass from Davis Alexander to beat the Calgary Stampeders.

== Career statistics ==
Legend
**Bold**	Career high

=== U Sports career ===
Year	Team	Games	Receiving				Rushing			
Year	Team	GP	Rec	Yds	Avg	TD	Att	Yds	Avg	TD
2021	Carleton	6	10	154	1.7	1	1	-4	-4.0	0
2022	Carleton	7	44	**528**	6.3	**7**	5	27	5.4	0
2023	Carleton	**8**	**51**	509	6.4	4	**7**	**57**	**8.1**	0
2024	Carleton	**8**	42	645	**15.4**	6	0	0	—	0
Career		29	147	1,836	12.5	18	13	80	6.2	0

== Personal life ==
Ferdinand's father, Denny Ferdinand, played in the CFL for eight years as a fullback for the Montreal Concordes, Saskatchewan Roughriders, and Ottawa Rough Riders.
