= 2024 U Sports football season =

- League: U Sports
- Sport: Canadian football
- Duration: August 23, 2024 – October 26, 2024

Playoffs
- Hardy Cup champions: Regina
- Yates Cup champions: Wilfrid Laurier
- Dunsmore Cup champions: Laval
- Loney Bowl champions: Bishop's
- Mitchell Bowl champions: Laval
- Uteck Bowl champions: Wilfrid Laurier

Vanier Cup
- Date: November 23, 2024
- Venue: Richardson Memorial Stadium (Kingston, Ontario)
- Champions: Laval Rouge et Or

Seasons
- 2023 2025

The 2024 U Sports football season began on August 23, 2024, with the defending champion Montreal Carabins hosting the Sherbrooke Vert et Or. On the following day, four Atlantic University Sport teams and six Ontario University Athletics teams opened their schedules on August 24, 2024. The Canada West conference began their season one week later on August 30.

The conference championships were played on the weekend of November 9, 2024, and the season ended on November 23, 2024 with the 59th Vanier Cup championship. The Vanier Cup game was held at Richardson Memorial Stadium in Kingston, Ontario for the second consecutive year. 27 university teams in Canada played U Sports football, the highest level of amateur Canadian football.

Manitoba kicker Maya Turner became the first woman to be named an all-star in U Sports football when she was named to the Canada West all-star team. She made 14 of 18 field goal attempts for the team, and made all her conversions.

== Schedules ==
On December 14, 2023, the RSEQ released their schedule which featured no major changes from the 2023 season, with five teams playing eight regular season games over ten weeks. The regular season started on August 23, 2024, and ended on October 26, 2024. The Dunsmore Cup game is scheduled to be played on November 9, 2024. The OUA next announced their schedule on March 27, 2024, which featured 11 teams playing over nine weeks with the regular season ending October 19, 2024. The AUS announced their schedule on April 11, 2024, featuring five teams playing over ten weeks between August 24 and October 26, 2024. On May 2, 2024, Canada West released their schedule with six teams playing eight games over nine weeks from August 30 to October 26, 2024.

== Regular season ==
=== Standings ===
Final standings

2024 AUS standings
Team	W		L	PF		PA	Pts	Ply
#6 Bishop's	8	–	0	328	–	128	16	†
St. FX	5	–	3	240	–	155	10	X
Saint Mary's	4	–	4	177	–	150	8	X
Acadia	2	–	6	132	–	267	4	X
Mount Allison	1	–	7	92	–	269	2	
† – Conference Champion; Rankings: U Sports Top 10

2024 OUA standings
Team	W		L	PF		PA	Pts	Ply
#2 Laurier	8	–	0	306	–	180	16	†
#4 Western	7	–	1	396	–	129	14	X
#5 Guelph	6	–	2	276	–	200	12	X
Windsor	5	–	3	216	–	183	10	X
#8 Queen's	5	–	3	261	–	201	10	X
Ottawa	4	–	4	206	–	187	8	X
McMaster	4	–	4	212	–	238	8	X
Carleton	2	–	6	217	–	245	4	
York	2	–	6	131	–	230	4	
Toronto	1	–	7	91	–	331	2	
Waterloo	0	–	8	148	–	336	0	
† – Conference Champion; Rankings: U Sports Top 10

2024 RSEQ standings
Team	W		L	PF		PA	Pts	Ply
#3 Laval	7	–	1	256	–	106	12	†
#1 Montréal	7	–	1	273	–	131	14	X
McGill	3	–	5	168	–	252	6	X
Concordia	2	–	6	132	–	225	4	X
Sherbrooke	1	–	7	120	–	235	2	
† – Conference Champion; Rankings: U Sports Top 10

2024 Canada West standings
Team	W		L	PF		PA	Pts	Ply
#7 Manitoba	7	–	1	251	–	204	14	†
#9 British Columbia	5	–	3	216	–	222	10	X
#10 Saskatchewan	5	–	3	233	–	233	10	X
Regina	3	–	5	157	–	177	6	X
Calgary	2	–	6	178	–	201	4	
Alberta	2	–	6	231	–	229	4	
† – Conference Champion; Rankings: U Sports Top 10

== Post-season awards ==
=== Award-winners ===
	Quebec	Ontario	Atlantic	Canada West	National
Hec Crighton Trophy	Arnaud Desjardins (Laval)	Taylor Elgersma (Wilfrid Laurier)	Justin Quirion (Bishop's)	Jackson Tachinski (Manitoba)	Taylor Elgersma (Wilfrid Laurier)
Presidents' Trophy	Mendel Joseph (Concordia)	Jackson Findlay (Western)	Alex MacDonald (Bishop's)	Nate Beauchemin (Calgary)	Nate Beauchemin (Calgary)
J. P. Metras Trophy	Jeremiah Ojo (Montreal)	Erik Andersen (Western)	Brandon-James Poulin-Marques (Bishop's)	Giordano Vaccaro (Manitoba)	Giordano Vaccaro (Manitoba)
Peter Gorman Trophy	Enrique James Leclair (Montreal)	Jackson Taylor (McMaster)	Nick Swain (Acadia)	Deacon Sterna (British Columbia)	Enrique James Leclair (Montreal)
Russ Jackson Award	N/A	Ben Maracle (Ottawa)	Malik Williams (Saint Mary's)	Ryker Frank (Saskatchewan)	Ryker Frank (Saskatchewan)
Frank Tindall Trophy	Glen Constantin (Laval)	Michael Faulds (Wilfrid Laurier)	Chérif Nicolas (Bishop's)	Brian Dobie (Manitoba)	Michael Faulds (Wilfrid Laurier)
Gino Fracas Award	Emilie Pfeiffer Badoux (Concordia)	P. J. Edgeworth (Western)	Gord Beattie (Saint Mary's)	Jerry Friesen (Saskatchewan)	Jerry Friesen (Saskatchewan)

=== All-Canadian Team ===
Offence
	First Team	Second Team
Quarterback	Taylor Elgersma (Laurier)	Arnaud Desjardins (Laval)
Running Back	Lucas Bertet-Dembele (Montréal); Braydon Stubbs (Manitoba)	Jared Chisari (Queen's); Ryker Frank (Saskatchewan)
Receiver	Olivier Cool (Laval); Ethan Jordan (Laurier); Seth Robertson (Western); Daniel Wiebe (Saskatchewan)	Darius Simmons (McGill); Enrique Jaimes Leclair (Montréal); Kaseem Ferdinand (Carleton); Samuel Davenport (UBC)
Centre	Anthony Horth (Sherbrooke)	Alex Berwick (Western)
Guard	Giordano Vaccaro (Manitoba); Alassane Diouf (Montréal)	Josh Rietveld (Laurier); Mitchel Schechinger (Guelph)
Tackle	Erik Andersen (Western); Sean Rowe (Manitoba)	Alexandre Levac (Montréal); Domenico Piazza (McGill)
Utility	Émeric Boutin (Laval)	Sebastian Parsalidis (Laurier)

Defence
	First Team	Second Team
Defensive Tackle	Christopher Fontenard (Montréal); Darien Newell (Queen's)	Collin Kornelson (Manitoba); Brandon-James Poulin-Marques (Bishop's)
Defensive End	Jeremiah Ojo (Montreal); Liam Reid (Calgary)	Kolade Amusan (Windsor); Ifenna Onyeka (Carleton)
Linebacker	Justin Cloutier (Laval); Justin Pace (Queen's); Seth Hundeby (Saskatchewan)	Harold Miessan (Montréal); Anthony Moretuzzo (Guelph); Mitchell Townsend (UBC)
Free Safety	Nate Beauchemin (Calgary)	Elijah Cramaix (Montréal)
Defensive Halfback	Mendel Joseph (Concordia); Robert Springer (Windsor)	Jackson Sombach (Regina); Mack Bannatyne (Alberta)
Cornerback	Jordan Lessard (Laval); Jerrell Cummings (UBC)	Richard Abduboffour (Saint Mary's); Istvan Assibo-Dadzie (Windsor)

Special Teams
	First Team	Second Team
Kicker	Ben Hadley (St. Francis Xavier)	Philippe Boyer (Montréal)
Punter	Michael Horvat (McMaster)	Erik Maximuik (Concordia)
Returner	Tayshaun Jackson (Laurier)	Alan Xiang (Alberta)
Rush/Cover	Ndéki Garant-Doumambila (Laval)	Chase Henning (UBC)

== Postseason ==
The Vanier Cup is played between the champions of the Mitchell Bowl and the Uteck Bowl, the national semi-final games. In 2024, according to the rotating schedule, the Québec Conference Dunsmore Cup champion visited the Canada West Hardy Trophy winners for the Mitchell Bowl. The Yates Cup Ontario Conference champion visited the Atlantic Conference's Loney Bowl winners for the Uteck Bowl. These games were played on November 16, 2024, while the 59th Vanier Cup was played on November 23, 2024.

=== Conference Championships ===
==== Atlantic University Sport ====
November 2 Semi-finals
1	Bishop's	59
4	Acadia	0
2	St. Francis Xavier	17
3	St. Mary's	21

November 9; 33rd Loney Bowl
1	Bishop's	25
3	St. Mary's	22

==== Canada West ====
November 2 Semi-finals
1	Manitoba	25
4	Regina	28
2	UBC	33
3	Saskatchewan	38

November 9; 87th Hardy Trophy
3	Saskatchewan	14
4	Regina	19

==== Ontario University Athletics ====
October 26; Quarter-finals
4	Windsor	19
5	Queen's	22
2	Western	46
7	McMaster	10
3	Guelph	26
6	Ottawa	15

November 2 Semi-finals
1	Laurier	29
5	Queen's	21
2	Western	30
3	Guelph	19

November 9; 116th Yates Cup
1	Laurier	51
2	Western	31

==== Réseau du Sport Étudiant du Québec ====
November 2 Demi-finales
1	Laval	41
4	Concordia	18
2	Montreal	42
3	McGill	3

November 9; 43e Coupe Dunsmore
1	Laval	22
2	Montreal	17

=== National Championship ===
November 16th Semi-finals
21st Uteck Bowl – Lennoxville, QC
Laurier	48
Bishop's	24
22nd Mitchell Bowl – Regina, SK
Regina	14
Laval	17

November 23rd Final
59th Vanier Cup – Kingston, ON
Laurier	17
Laval	22
