= Hayden Harris (defensive lineman) =

Canadian-American gridiron football player (born 2000)

- Harris with the BC Lions in 2026

No. 48 – BC Lions
- Position: Defensive end
- Roster status: Active
- CFL status: National

Personal information
- Born: November 4, 2000 (age 26)
- Listed height: 6 ft 2 in (1.88 m)
- Listed weight: 255 lb (116 kg)

Career information
- High school: Eastside Catholic (Sammamish, Washington)
- College: UCLA (2019–2022); Montana (2023–2024)
- NFL draft: 2025: undrafted
- CFL draft: 2025: 2nd round, 11th overall pick

Career history
- Buffalo Bills (2025)*; BC Lions (2025–present)
- * Offseason or practice squad member only

Awards and highlights
- Second-team All-Big Sky (2024)

Career CFL statistics as of 2026
- Games played: 21
- Tackles: 17
- Stats at CFL.ca

Hayden Harris (born November 4, 2000) is an Canadian-American professional football defensive end for the BC Lions of the Canadian Football League (CFL). He played college football for the UCLA Bruins and Montana Grizzlies.

== Early life ==
Harris was born on November 4, 2000. He attended Eastside Catholic School in Sammamish, Washington, where he played at wide receiver, linebacker and quarterback. Harris committed to play college football at University of California, Los Angeles. He has national status through his mother, who was born in Vancouver.

== College career ==
Harris played college football for the UCLA Bruins from 2019 to 2022 and Montana Grizzlies from 2023 to 2024. He appeared in five games for the Bruins and made two tackles. On November 30, 2022, Harris entered the transfer portal. On January 16, 2023, he committed to University of Montana. In his first season at Montana, Harris had 32 tackles, including 4.5 for loss, two sacks and two pass deflections. In 2024, he made 52 tackles, including 17 for loss, 9.5 sacks, one interception, two pass break ups, three forced fumbles and two fumble recoveries. Harris earned second-team All-Big Sky honors.

== Professional career ==
Pre-draft measurables
Height	Weight	Arm length	Hand span	Wingspan	40-yard dash	20-yard shuttle	Three-cone drill	Broad jump	Bench press
6 ft 5 in (1.96 m)	257 lb (117 kg)	32 1/8 in (0.82 m)	10 1/8 in (0.26 m)	6 ft 6 in (1.98 m)	4.81 s	4.51 s	7.40 s	9 ft 7 in (2.92 m)	25 reps
All values from Pro Day

=== Buffalo Bills ===
After not being selected in the 2025 NFL draft, Harris signed with the Buffalo Bills of the National Football League (NFL) as an undrafted free agent. On July 31, he was released with an injury settlement.

=== BC Lions ===
Harris was selected in the second round, with the 11th overall selection, by the BC Lions in the 2025 CFL draft. On September 30, he signed with the team. Harris played in the final five games, including two in the playoffs, recording one tackle.
