= Samuel Carson (Canadian football) =

Canadian football player (born 2002)

No. 69 – Ottawa Redblacks
- Position: Offensive lineman
- Roster status: Active
- CFL status: National

Personal information
- Born: February 18, 2002 (age 24); Calgary, Alberta, Canada
- Listed height: 6 ft 4 in (1.93 m)
- Listed weight: 300 lb (136 kg)

Career information
- High school: Henry Wise Wood HS
- College: Louisiana–Monroe (2023–2024)
- University: Calgary (2020–2022)
- CFL draft: 2025: 2nd round, 12th overall pick

Career history
- 2025–present: Ottawa Redblacks
- Stats at CFL.ca

Samuel Carson (born February 18, 2002) is a Canadian professional football offensive lineman for the Ottawa Redblacks of the Canadian Football League (CFL). Carson was drafted with the 12th overall pick in the 2025 CFL draft by the Ottawa Redblacks. Carson was born in Kelowna and grew up in Calgary, where his father, Paul Carson, was the offensive line coach at the University of Calgary for the Calgary Dinos football team. After attending Henry Wise Wood High School in Calgary, Carson played two years of U Sports football at the University of Calgary before transferring to play two years of college football at the University of Louisiana at Monroe.

Pre-draft measurables
Height	Weight	Arm length	Hand span	Wingspan
6 ft 3 3/4 in (1.92 m)	297 lb (135 kg)	31 5/8 in (0.80 m)	8 3/8 in (0.21 m)	6 ft 3 3/8 in (1.91 m)
All values from Pro Day
