= Nate Beauchemin =

Canadian gridiron football player (born 2003)

- Beauchemin with the Montreal Alouettes in 2026

No. 23 – Montreal Alouettes
- Position: Defensive back
- Roster status: Active
- CFL status: National

Personal information
- Born: February 2, 2003 (age 23); Calgary, Alberta, Canada
- Listed height: 6 ft 1 in (1.85 m)
- Listed weight: 204 lb (93 kg)

Career information
- High school: Kelowna (Kelowna, British Columbia)
- University: Calgary
- CFL draft: 2025: 2nd round, 14th overall pick

Career history
- Montreal Alouettes (2025–present)

Awards and highlights
- Presidents' Trophy (2024); First-team All-Canadian (2024); Canada West Defensive Player of the Year (2024); Canada West All-Star (2024)
- Stats at CFL.ca

Nate Beauchemin (born February 2, 2003) is a Canadian professional football defensive back for the Montreal Alouettes of the Canadian Football League (CFL). He was selected by the Alouettes in the second round of the 2025 CFL draft after playing U Sports football at the University of Calgary.

== Early life ==
Nate Beauchemin was born on February 2, 2003, in Calgary, Alberta, Canada. When he was three, his family moved to Kelowna, British Columbia. He played high school football at Kelowna Secondary School as a quarterback.

== University career ==
Beauchemin played U Sports football for the Calgary Dinos of the University of Calgary from 2021 to 2024 as a defensive back. He played in four games as a freshman in 2021, posting two solo tackles and two assisted tackles. He appeared in eight games in 2022, recording 27 solo tackles, nine assisted tackles, two sacks, two forced fumbles, three pass breakups, and one blocked kick. Beauchemin was named an Academic All-Canadian for the 2022 season.

Beauchemin played in eight games for the second straight year in 2023, totaling 23 solo tackles, 25 assisted tackles, four interceptions for 102 yards and one touchdown, seven pass breakups, and one fumble recovery. He was an Academic All-Canadian for the second year in a row and was also the U Sports Athlete of the Week for September 27, 2023. As a senior in 2024, Beauchemin played in eight games for the third consecutive season, recording 28 solo tackles, 26 assisted tackles, four interceptions for 167 yards and two touchdowns, one forced fumble, four pass breakups, and one blocked kick. He won the Presidents' Trophy, given to the best U Sports defensive player who is not a defensive lineman. He was the first Dinos player to win the award since Darcy Kopp in 1985. Other honors he earned in 2024 included U Sports first-team All-Canadian, Canada West Defensive Player of the Year, and Canada West All-Star. Beauchemin majored in kinesiology at Calgary in order to become a chiropractor.

== Professional career ==
Pre-draft measurables
Height	Weight	40-yard dash	20-yard shuttle	Three-cone drill	Vertical jump	Broad jump	Bench press
6 ft 0 7/8 in (1.85 m)	204 lb (93 kg)	4.63 s	4.33 s	6.96 s	36.0 in (0.91 m)	10 ft 3 1/4 in (3.13 m)	17 reps
All values from CFL Combine

Beauchemin was selected by the Montreal Alouettes in the second round, with the 14th overall pick, of the 2025 CFL draft. He officially signed with the team on May 7, 2025.

== Personal life ==
Beauchemin's older brother played for the Okanagan Sun of the Canadian Junior Football League. Another sibling played soccer at the University of British Columbia Okanagan. His mother competed in equestrian show jumping.
