= Denny Ferdinand =

Canadian football player (1962–2002)

Profile
- Position: Fullback

Personal information
- Born: March 22, 1962; Port of Spain, Trinidad and Tobago
- Died: April 2, 2002 (aged 40); Ottawa, Ontario

Career information
- College: none - Montreal Junior Concordes

Career history
- 1982–84: Montreal Concordes
- 1985–88: Saskatchewan Roughriders
- 1989: Ottawa Rough Riders

Awards and highlights
- 1983 - Lew Hayman Trophy

Denny Ferdinand (March 22, 1962 - April 2, 2002) was a Canadian Football League fullback.

Born in Trinidad and Tobago, and having lived in Canada, Ferdinand qualified as a non-import for CFL football player roster ratios. A graduate of the Montreal Junior Concordes program, he joined the newly formed Montreal Concordes in 1982. His best season came as a pro was 1983, when he rushed for 603 yards and caught 27 passes, for which he won the Lew Hayman Trophy as the best Canadian in the East.

After two more season in Montreal he was injured and traded to the Winnipeg Blue Bombers, who released him. He then signed with the Saskatchewan Roughriders and played in Regina for four seasons, his best being 1986, when he ran for 572 yards. Traded to the Calgary Stampeders in 1988, he was again released, and finished his career with the Ottawa Rough Riders, playing six games in 1989.

Ferdinand died at the age of 40, on April 2, 2002, at his home in Ottawa, of heart arrhythmia. He is survived by daughter Talitha, 5 sons (including twins born after his death; Denny and Kaseem Ferdinand), Justin Ferdinand, Cedric Ferdinand, former Concordia University Stingers running back and Tristan Ferdinand.
