= Gabriel Maisonneuve =

Canadian gridiron football player (born 2000)

- Maisonneuve with the Toronto Argonauts in 2026

No. 79 – Toronto Argonauts
- Position: Defensive lineman
- Roster status: Practice roster
- CFL status: National

Personal information
- Born: October 29, 2000 (age 26)
- Listed height: 6 ft 3 in (1.91 m)
- Listed weight: 236 lb (107 kg)

Career information
- High school: Outaouais (Gatineau, Quebec)
- University: Montreal (2021–2025)
- CFL draft: 2025: 5th round, 44th overall pick

Career history
- Montreal Alouettes (2025–2026); Toronto Argonauts (2026–present)

Awards and highlights
- 2× Vanier Cup champion (2023, 2025); First-team All-Canadian (2025); First-team RSEQ All-Star (2025)
- Stats at CFL.ca

Gabriel Maisonneuve (born October 29, 2000) is a Canadian professional football defensive lineman for the Toronto Argonauts of the Canadian Football League (CFL). He played U Sports football for the Montreal Carabins.

== Early life ==
Maisonneuve was born on October 29, 2000, in Gatineau. He attended Université de Montréal. He played for the Tigres de l’ESHG in high school and for the Griffons du Cégep de l’Outaouais.

== University career ==
Maisonneuve played U Sports football for the Montreal Carabins from 2021 to 2025. In 31 games, he had 47 tackles, nine sacks and three forced fumbles. Maisonneuve was a first-team RSEQ All-Star and All-Canadian in 2025.

== Professional career ==
Pre-draft measurables
Height	Weight	40-yard dash	20-yard shuttle	Three-cone drill	Vertical jump	Broad jump	Bench press
6 ft 3 1/8 in (1.91 m)	236 lb (107 kg)	4.72 s	4.32 s	6.87 s	31 in (0.79 m)	9 ft 11 1/2 in (3.04 m)	21 reps
All values from CFL Combine

=== Montreal Alouettes ===
Maisonneuve was selected by the Montreal Alouettes with the 44th overall pick in the fifth round of the 2025 CFL draft. On May 7, he officially signed with the team. On May 31, Maisonneuve was placed on the retired list to complete his final year of U Sports eligibility. On December 18, he was re-signed by the team. On May 5, 2026, Maisonneuve was released.

=== Toronto Argonauts ===
On August 17, 2026, Maisonneuve was signed by the Toronto Argonauts. He made his CFL debut on August 22, against the Hamilton Tiger-Cats, recording one special teams tackle.
