= Daniel Wiebe =

Canadian gridiron football player (born 2003)

No. 87 – Saskatchewan Roughriders
- Position: Wide receiver
- Roster status: Active
- CFL status: National

Personal information
- Born: June 5, 2003 (age 23)
- Listed height: 5 ft 9 in (1.75 m)
- Listed weight: 185 lb (84 kg)

Career information
- High school: Rosetown Central (Rosetown, Saskatchewan); Holy Cross (Saskatoon, Saskatchewan)
- University: Saskatchewan (2021–2025)
- CFL draft: 2025: 8th round, 69th overall pick

Career history
- Saskatchewan Roughriders (2025–present)

Awards and highlights
- 2× First-team All-Canadian (2024, 2025)

Career CFL statistics as of 2026
- Receptions: 22
- Receiving yards: 327
- Receiving touchdowns: 2
- Stats at CFL.ca

Daniel Wiebe (born June 5, 2003) is a Canadian professional football wide receiver for the Saskatchewan Roughriders of the Canadian Football League (CFL). He played U Sports football for the Saskatchewan Huskies.

== Early life ==
Wiebe was born on June 5, 2003. He attended and played football at Rosetown Central High School in Rosetown, Saskatchewan and Holy Cross High School in Saskatoon, Saskatchewan.

== University career ==
Wiebe played U Sports football for the Saskatchewan Huskies from 2021 to 2025. He played in 46 games, starting in 25, catching 217 passes for 3,065 yards and 27 touchdowns. In 2025, Wiebe was named the Canada West Football Player of the Year, after he led the league in receptions (60), receiving yards (929), and touchdowns (11). He was named to the first-team All-Canadian team twice in 2024 and 2025.

== Professional career ==
Pre-draft measurables
| Height | Weight | 40-yard dash | 20-yard shuttle | Three-cone drill | Vertical jump | Broad jump | Bench press |
|---|---|---|---|---|---|---|---|
| 5 ft 8 7/8 in (1.75 m) | 185 lb (84 kg) | 4.52 s | 3.95 s | 6.97 s | 37 in (0.94 m) | 9 ft 11 3/8 in (3.03 m) | 15 reps |
All values from CFL Combine

Wiebe was selected by the Saskatchewan Roughriders in the eighth round, 69th overall, of the 2025 CFL draft. He spent the training camp and preseason with the team before he was released to return to the Saskatchewan Huskies. On November 27, 2025, Wiebe signed with team. On May 30, 2026, he was signed to the practice roster. Wiebe made his first appearance on June 26, against the Toronto Argonauts and had two receptions for 48 yards and one touchdown.
