= Ashton Miller-Melancon =

Canadian gridiron football player (born 2001)

- Miller-Melancon with the Calgary Stampeders in 2026

No. 24 – Calgary Stampeders
- Position: Defensive back
- Roster status: Active
- CFL status: National

Personal information
- Born: September 14, 2001 (age 25)
- Listed height: 6 ft 2 in (1.88 m)
- Listed weight: 201 lb (91 kg)

Career information
- High school: John Rennie (Pointe-Claire, Quebec)
- University: Queen's (2021–2025)
- CFL draft: 2025: 8th round, 65th overall pick

Career history
- Calgary Stampeders (2025–present)

Awards and highlights
- First-team All-Canadian (2022); 3× First-team OUA All-Star (2022, 2023, 2025); Second-team OUA All-Star (2021); OUA All-Rookie team (2021)
- Stats at CFL.ca

Ashton Miller-Melancon (born September 14, 2001) is a Canadian professional football defensive back for the Calgary Stampeders of the Canadian Football League (CFL). He played U Sports football for the Queen's Gaels.

== Early life ==
Miller-Melancon was born on September 14, 2001. He attended John Rennie High School in Pointe-Claire, Quebec.

== University career ==
Miller-Melancon played U Sports football for the Queen's Gaels from 2021 to 2025. In 52 games, he had 197 tackles, including 3.5 for loss, 21 interceptions, 39 pass break ups, two forced fumbles and two fumble recoveries. Miller-Melancon was named an Ontario University Athletics (OUA) All-Star four times in five seasons. He also earned All-Rookie team honors in 2021.

== Professional career ==
Pre-draft measurables
| Height | Weight | 40-yard dash | 20-yard shuttle | Three-cone drill | Vertical jump | Broad jump | Bench press |
|---|---|---|---|---|---|---|---|
| 6 ft 1 5/8 in (1.87 m) | 203 lb (92 kg) | 4.75 s | 4.39 s | 7.20 s | 34 in (0.86 m) | 9 ft 9 3/4 in (2.99 m) | 12 reps |
All values from CFL Combine

Miller-Melancon was selected in the eighth round, with the 65th overall selection, by the Calgary Stampeders in the 2025 CFL draft. On August 8, he was released to play his last year of eligibility at Queen's University. On November 27, Miller-Melancon was re-signed by the team. On June 5, 2026, he made his CFL debut against the Winnipeg Blue Bombers, where he had one special teams tackle. On October 2, against the Saskatchewan Roughriders, Miller-Melancon had six tackles, two pass break ups and an interception.
