= Paris Shand =

Canadian gridiron football player (born 2001)

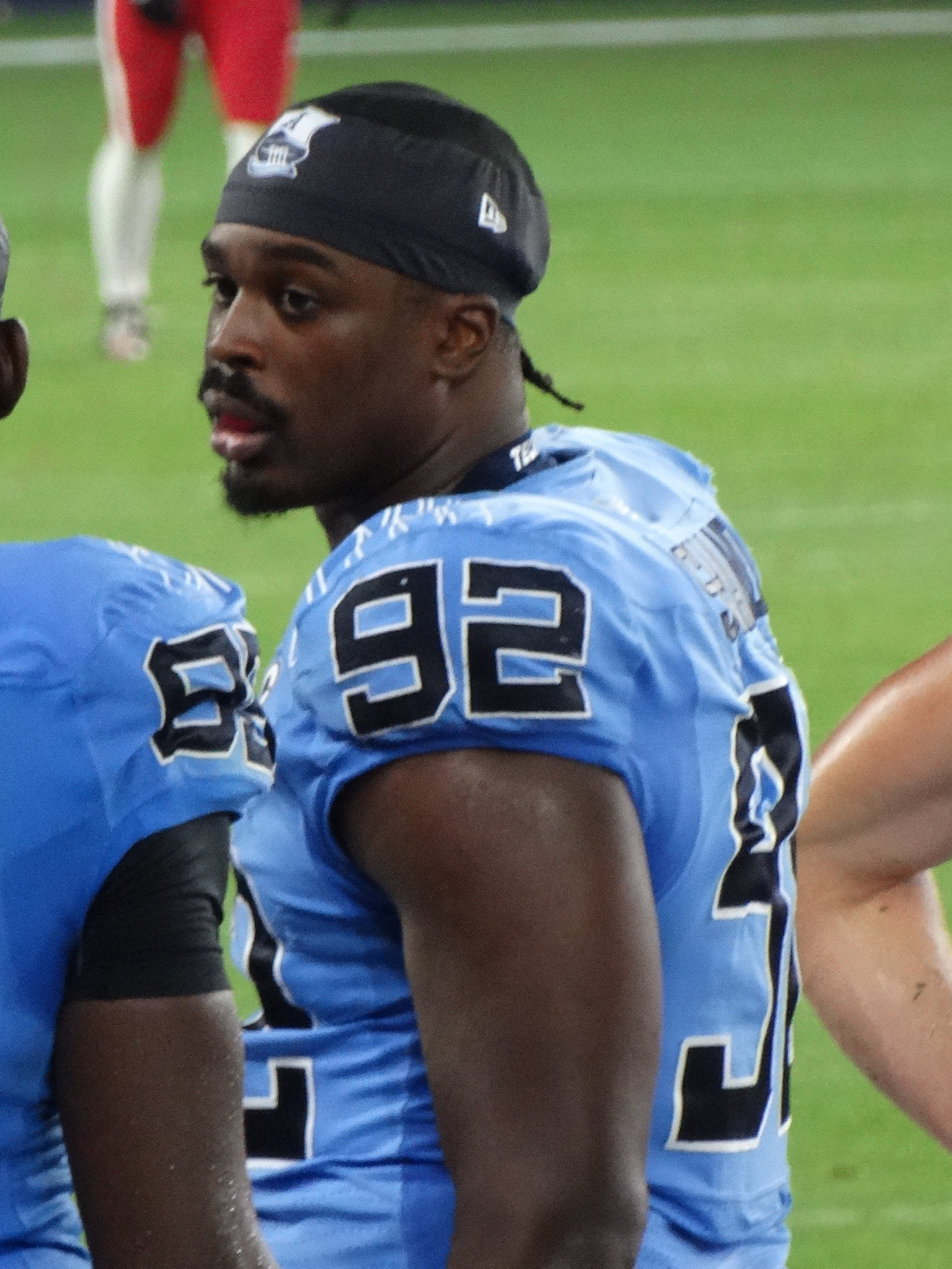
- Shand with the Toronto Argonauts in 2026

No. 92 – Toronto Argonauts
- Position: Defensive end
- Roster status: Active
- CFL status: National

Personal information
- Born: May 7, 2001 (age 25); Toronto, Ontario, Canada
- Listed height: 6 ft 4 in (1.93 m)
- Listed weight: 290 lb (132 kg)

Career information
- High school: Loomis Chaffee (Windsor, Connecticut, U.S.)
- College: Arizona (2020–2022); LSU (2023–2024)
- NFL draft: 2025: undrafted
- CFL draft: 2025: 2nd round, 19th overall pick

Career history
- Buffalo Bills (2025)*; Toronto Argonauts (2026–present)
- * Offseason or practice squad member only
- Stats at CFL.ca

Paris Xavier Shand (born May 7, 2001) is a Canadian professional football defensive end for the Toronto Argonauts of the Canadian Football League (CFL). He played college football for the Arizona Wildcats and LSU Tigers.

== Early life ==
Shand grew up in Toronto, Ontario, Canada, where he was part of the Canada national under-16 basketball team that won a silver medal at the 2017 FIBA Under-16 Americas Championship in Argentina. He also won a silver medal in the shot put in the Ontario Federation of School Athletic Associations. Shand moved to Windsor, Connecticut, and attended Loomis Chaffee School playing for head coach Jeff Moore. Coming out of high school, he was rated as a three-star recruit and committed to play college football for the Arizona Wildcats.

== College career ==
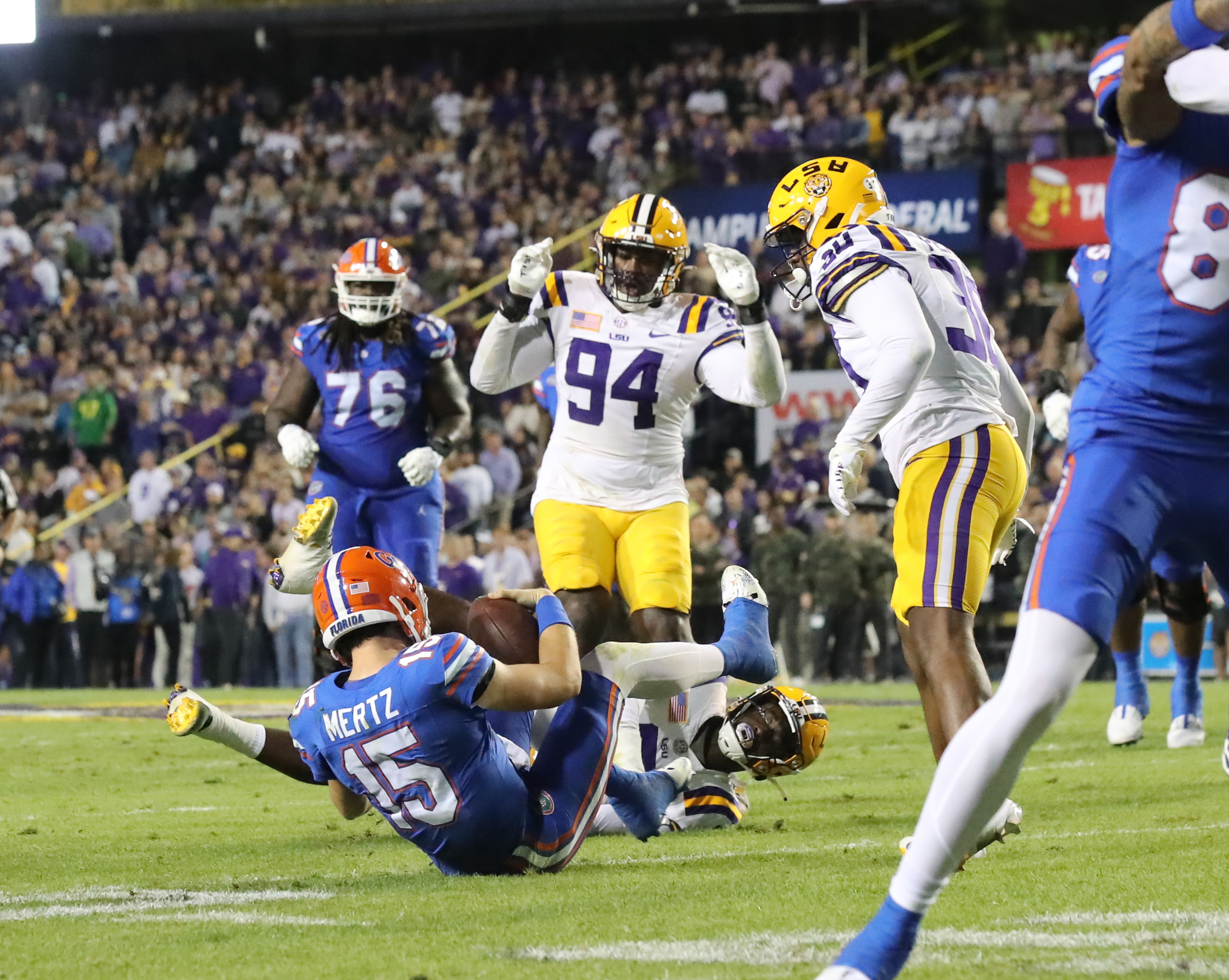
Shand (94) with the LSU Tigers in 2023

=== Arizona ===
As a freshman in 2020, Shand tallied two tackles with one being for a loss, and a sack. In 2021, he played in 11 games with three starts, while notching 16 tackles with two being for a loss, and a sack and a half. In 2022, Shand totaled 23 tackles with two and a half being for a loss, two sacks, two forced fumbles, and a fumble recovery, in nine games with seven starts. After the season, he entered his name into the NCAA transfer portal.

=== LSU ===
Shand transferred to play for the LSU Tigers. In week 7 of the 2023 season, he notched six tackles with one and a half being for a loss, in a win over Auburn. In his first season with LSU, Shand recorded 17 tackles with five being for a loss, and two sacks.

== Professional career ==
Pre-draft measurables
Height	Weight	Arm length	Hand span	Wingspan	40-yard dash	10-yard split	20-yard split	20-yard shuttle	Three-cone drill	Vertical jump	Broad jump	Bench press
6 ft 3 3/4 in (1.92 m)	268 lb (122 kg)	34 in (0.86 m)	9 3/4 in (0.25 m)	6 ft 9 1/4 in (2.06 m)	4.82 s	1.62 s	2.87 s	4.52 s	7.06 s	33.5 in (0.85 m)	9 ft 7 in (2.92 m)	17 reps
All values from Pro Day

Shand was ranked as the #3 overall prospect ahead of the 2025 CFL draft and was drafted in the second round (19th overall) by the Toronto Argonauts.

=== Buffalo Bills ===
Shand signed with the Buffalo Bills after going undrafted in the 2025 NFL draft. He was released on August 26 as part of final roster cuts.

=== Toronto Argonauts ===
On February 20, 2026, it was announced that Shand had signed with the Toronto Argonauts.
