= Ernest Manning High School =

Location
- 20 Springborough Boulevard S.W. Calgary, Alberta, T3H 0N7; Canada; 51.034644°N 114.190722°W

Information
- Type: Public
- Motto: Duc, Disce, Novã (Lead, Learn, Innovate)
- Established: 1963 (2011- new location)
- School board: Calgary Board of Education
- Principal: Mike Wilson
- Grades: 10, 11, 12
- Enrollment: 1683 (2021)
  - Grade 10: 528
  - Grade 11: 496
  - Grade 12: 659
- Team name: Griffins
- Communities served: Aspen Woods, Christie Park, East Springbank, Signal Hill, Springbank Hill, Strathcona Park and West Springs
- Feeder schools: A.E. Cross, Bishop Pinkham, Vincent Massey, West Ridge and Griffith Woods.
- Website: school.cbe.ab.ca/school/ernestmanning/Pages/default.aspx

Ernest Manning High School is a public senior high school located in the City of Calgary, Alberta, Canada, south of the Bow River. The school falls under the jurisdiction of the Calgary Board of Education.

== History ==
The original Ernest Manning High School was built in 1963, and is named after the eighth Premier of Alberta, Ernest Manning.

The school is part of the Action for Bright Children Society.

== New campus ==
On October 7, 2008, the Calgary Board of Education approved and announced the closure of the existing Ernest Manning High School to facilitate the construction of Westbrook station on the western extension of the CTrain’s Blue Line. The last class to graduate was in the summer of 2011 before the building was torn down. The students of Ernest Manning transferred to the new high school located on the western edge of Calgary in the community of Springbank Hill in fall 2011. The construction of the new high school was completed in September 2011.

== Athletics ==
The Ernest Manning Griffins athletic teams compete in the Calgary Zone of the Alberta Schools Athletic Association. The school holds membership in the Calgary Senior High School Athletic Association.

Football In 2019 the Jr. Football Team went 8–0, beating traditional powerhouses St. Francis and Notre Dame en route to a City Championship. Ernest Manning has won five Total Div I Football titles (Two Jr. Varsity, Three Sr. Varsity Titles) Along with winning two Provincial Championships in 2023 and 2025 beating traditional powerhouses Harry Ainlay High School and Raymond high school.

List of Championships in CSHSAA

1965-66: Sr. Varsity Boys Div I Basketball. 1966-67: Jr. Varsity Girls Div I Basketball. 1969-70: Sr. Varsity Girls Div I Basketball. 1970-71: Jr. Varsity Boys Track and Field. 1972-72: Sr. Varsity Girls Div I Basketball. 1974-75: Aggregate Coed Badminton. 1975-76: Grand Aggregate Coed Diving. 1976-77: Sr. Varsity Girls Div II Basketball. 1977-78: Jr. Varsity Boys Div II Basketball. 1979-80: Sr. Varsity Girls Div I Volleyball. 1984-85: Aggregate Coed Div II Badminton, Sr. Varsity Boys Div II Football. 1985-86: Jr. Varsity Boys Div I Rugby. 1987-88: Sr. Varsity Boys Div II Rugby. 1988-89: Sr. Varsity Boys Div II Football. 1989-90: Jr. Varsity Boys Div II Football, Sr. Varsity Boys Div II Football. 2002-03: Sr. Varsity Boys Div II Basketball. 2004-05: Sr. Varsity Girls Div II Volleyball. 2006-07: Sr. Varsity Boys Div III Football, Sr. Varsity Girls Div III Field Hockey. 2007-08: Sr. Varsity Boys Div II Volleyball, Jr. Varsity Boys Div III Basketball, Sr. Varsity Girls Div III Field Hockey, Varsity Girls Div III Rugby. 2008-09: Varsity Girls Div III Soccer, Sr. Varsity Boys Div III Football, Sr. Varsity Boys Div III Basketball. 2009-10: Sr. Varsity Boys Div III Volleyball, Sr. Varsity Boys Div III Basketball, Sr. Varsity Boys Div III Rugby, Jr. Varsity Boys Track and Field. 2010-11: Varsity Girls Div III Soccer, Sr. Varsity Boys Div III Volleyball, Sr. Varsity Girls Div III Basketball. 2011-12: Intermediate Boys Cross Country, Varsity Girls Div II Soccer, Jr. Varsity Girls Div III Basketball, Jr. Varsity Boys Div III Basketball, Sr. Varsity Boys Div III Basketball, Jr. Varsity Girls Track and Field. 2012-13: Varsity Girls Div I Soccer, Jr. Varsity Girls Div II Volleyball, Div III Badminton, Sr. Varsity Girls Div II Basketball. 2013-14: Varsity Girls Div I Soccer, Jr. Varsity Girls Div II Volleyball, Sr. Varsity Girls Div II Volleyball, Sr. Varsity Boys Div II Volleyball, Div III Badminton, Sr. Varsity Girls Track and Field. 2014-15: Jr. Varsity Girls Div II Volleyball, Sr. Varsity Girls Div II Volleyball, Div III Badminton, 2015-16: Div II Badminton, Jr. Varsity Girls Div II Basketball, Sr. Varsity Boys Div I Soccer. 2016-17: Elbow Division Team Aggregate Swimming. 2017-18: Div II Badminton 2018-19: Sr. Varsity Girls Div II Volleyball, Jr. Varsity Boys Div II Rugby. 2019-20: Varsity Girls Div I Soccer, Jr. Varsity Boys Div I Football, Sr. Varsity Boys Div IB Football, Jr. Varsity Girls Div II Volleyball, Sr. Varsity Boys Div II Basketball. 2021-22: Jr. Varsity Boys Div I Football. 2022-23: Sr. Varsity Boys Div I Football, Div II Badminton, Sr. Varsity Boys Div II Basketball, Intermediate Boys Track and Field. 2023-24: Sr. Varsity Boys Div I Football, Sr. Varsity Girls Div II Volleyball.

ASAA Provincial Results (WIP)

1963-64: Jr. Girls 80m hurdles Track and Field Gold Winner (1st place), Sr. Boys 880Yds Track and Field 4th place. Sr. Boys Mile Track and Field Bronze Winner (3rd place). 1968-69: Boys Badminton 5th place. Jr. Girls 440Yds Track and Field Gold Winner (1st place), Jr. Girls High Jump Track and Field Silver Winner (2nd place). Intermediate Boys 100m Track and Field Silver Winner (2nd place). Intermediate Boys 200m Track and Field Silver Winner (2nd place). 1969-70: Girls 4A Basketball Gold Winner (1st place). Boys Gymnastics Gold Winner (1st place). Jr. Boys 100m Track and Field Gold Winner (1st place). Sr. Boys 100m Track and Field Gold Winner (1st place). Sr. Boys 200m Track and Field Gold Winner (1st place). 1970-71: Sr. Boys Cross Country 6th place. Jr. Boys Long Jump Track and Field Gold Winner (1st place.) Intermediate Boys 100m Track and Field Gold Winner (1st place). Intermediate Boys 200m Track and Field Gold Winner (1st place). 1972-73: Girls 4A Basketball Bronze Winner (3rd place). 1986-87: Intermediate Boys Cross Country 6th place. 1987-88: Sr. Boys Cross Country Gold Winner (1st place). 1994-95: Jr. Girls Badminton Silver Winner (2nd place). 1995-96: Sr. Girls Badminton Bronze Winner (3rd place). 1996-97: Sr. Girls Badminton Silver Winner (2nd place). 2000-01: Sr. Girls Cross Country Silver Winner (2nd place). 2003-04: Sr. Boys Badminton Gold Winner (1st place), Intermediate Boys Badminton Gold Winner (1st place). 2004-05: Intermediate Girls Badminton Gold Winner (1st place), Sr. Boys Badminton Gold Winner (1st place), Sr. Boys Cross Country Gold Winner (1st place), Sr. Boys Cross Country 7th place. 2005-06: Sr. Girls Badminton Gold Winner (1st place), Intermediate Boys Badminton Silver Winner (2nd place). 2007-08: Sr. Girls Cross Country 5th place. 2010-11: Intermediate Girls Cross Country 5th place, Myron Pearman Trophy (Team Race) 10th place. 2013-14: Boys 4A Basketball Consolation Winner. 2016-17: 82 kg M Wrestling, Silver 2017-18: 90 kg M Wrestling, Bronze 2018-19: Rollie Miles Trophy (Team Race) 9th place. 2023-24: Boys Individual Golf Gold Winner (1st place). Sr. Boys Tier I BRIAN FRYER (Ranked) Football Gold Winner (1st place.)

ASAA Provincial Records

2015-16: Jr. Boys High Jump record of 2.01M set by Charlie Kambata. Intermediate Boys Shot Put (5 kg) record of 14.73M set by Tanner Dambrauskas.

== Notable alumni ==
- Mack Bannatyne (born 2001), CFL player
- Doug Black (born 1952), Canadian senator.
- Bret Hart (born 1957), former professional wrestler, 5-Time WWF Champion.
- Owen Hart (1965–1999), professional wrestler.
- Nivek Ogre (born 1962), lead singer of Skinny Puppy.
