= Ethan Ball =

Canadian football player (born 2001)

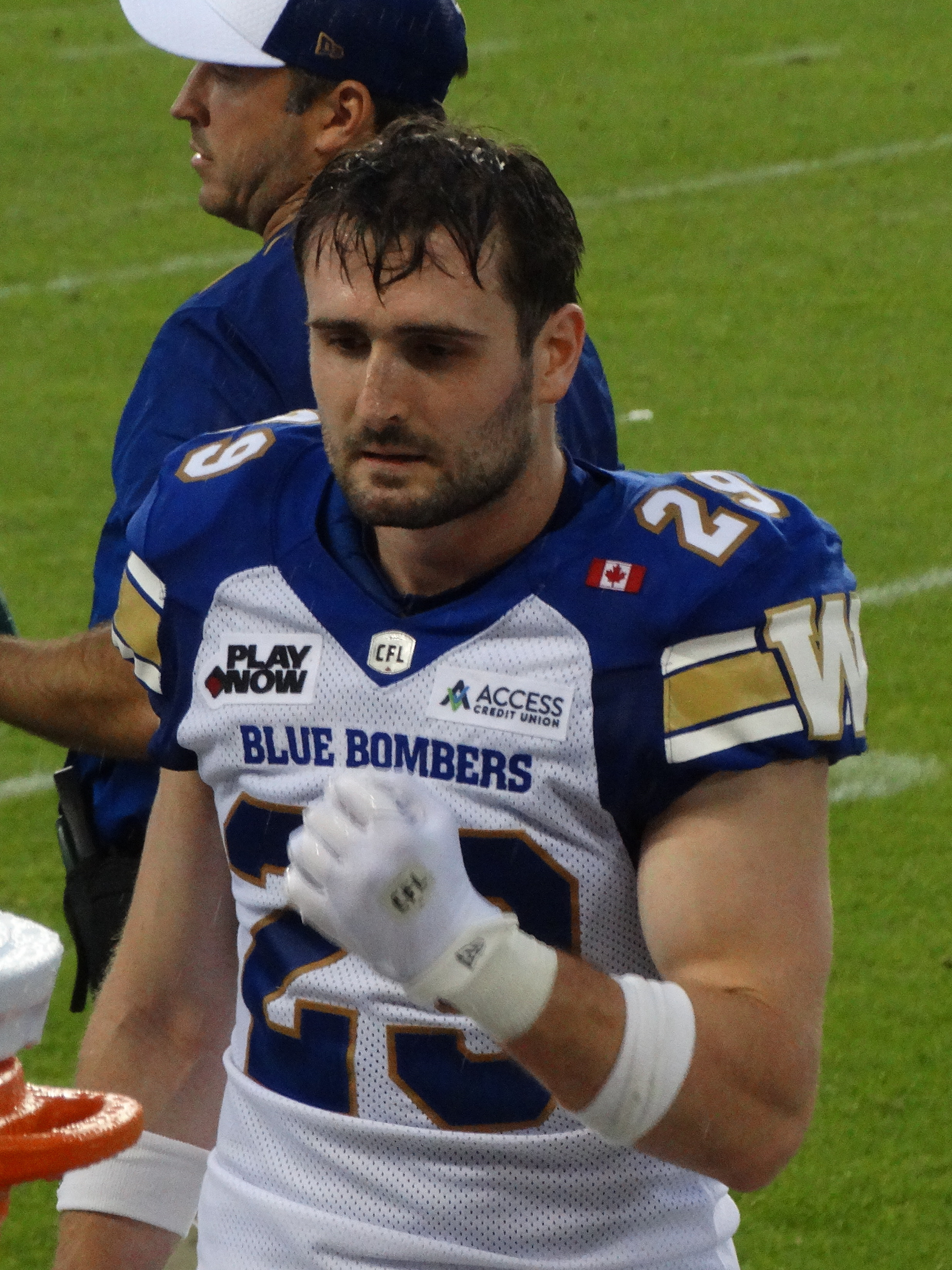
- Ball with the Winnipeg Blue Bombers in 2025

No. 29 – Winnipeg Blue Bombers
- Position: Defensive back
- Roster status: Active
- CFL status: National

Personal information
- Born: December 23, 2001 (age 24)
- Listed height: 5 ft 11 in (1.80 m)
- Listed weight: 192 lb (87 kg)

Career information
- High school: Riffel (Regina, Saskatchewan)
- College: North Dakota (2020–2023)
- University: Calgary (2024)
- CFL draft: 2025: 6th round, 54th overall pick

Career history
- Winnipeg Blue Bombers (2025–present)
- Stats at CFL.ca

Ethan Ball (born December 23, 2001) is a Canadian professional football defensive back for the Winnipeg Blue Bombers of the Canadian Football League (CFL). He played college football at North Dakota and U Sports football at Calgary.

== Early life ==
Ethan Ball was born on December 23, 2001. He grew up a Saskatchewan Roughriders and San Diego Chargers fan. He also played hockey as a youth but by Grade 10, he decided to solely focus on football. Ball played high school football at Michael A. Riffel High School in Regina, Saskatchewan, playing both wide receiver and defensive back. He had nearly 1,000 receiving yards his senior year and helped Riffel advance to the Regina Intercollegiate Football League championship game.

== College and university career ==
Ball originally committed to play U Sports football for the Calgary Dinos of the University of Calgary as a receiver. However, he switched his commitment to the University of North Dakota, where he played American football as a defensive back for the North Dakota Fighting Hawks from 2020 to 2023. He played in one game during the COVID-19 shortened 2020 season and posted one solo tackle before redshirting. He played in seven games as a backup defensive back in 2021, recording two solo tackles and one assisted tackle. Ball appeared in all 12 games during the 2022 season, seeing time on special teams and as a backup defensive back while totaling 18 solo tackles and seven assisted tackles. He earned honorable mention MVFC All-Academic Team honors for the 2022 season. He played in 12 games in 2023, again as a backup defensive back and on special teams, recording 12 solo tackles and three assisted tackles. He majored in environmental studies at North Dakota.

In 2024, Ball transferred to the University of Calgary for his final season of eligibility in order to increase his CFL draft odds by playing Canadian football again. He only played in five games during the 2024 season due to injuries, posting 19 solo tackles, 16 assisted tackles, two pass breakups, and one fumble recovery. He majored in open studies at Calgary.

== Professional career ==
Pre-draft measurables
Height	Weight	40-yard dash	20-yard shuttle	Three-cone drill	Vertical jump	Broad jump	Bench press
5 ft 11 1/2 in (1.82 m)	190 lb (86 kg)	4.66 s	4.25 s	7.15 s	35.0 in (0.89 m)	10 ft 3 3/8 in (3.13 m)	13 reps
All values from CFL Combine

Ball was selected by the Winnipeg Blue Bombers in the sixth round, with the 54th overall pick, of the 2025 CFL draft. He officially signed with the team on May 2, 2025. He was moved to the practice roster on June 1. On July 25, 2025, Ball was promoted to the active roster to replace the injured Lane Novak.

== Personal life ==
Ball's father, Michael Ball, was a broadcaster for the Saskatchewan Roughriders from 2022 to 2023.
