= Devin Adams =

American gridiron football player (born 1998)

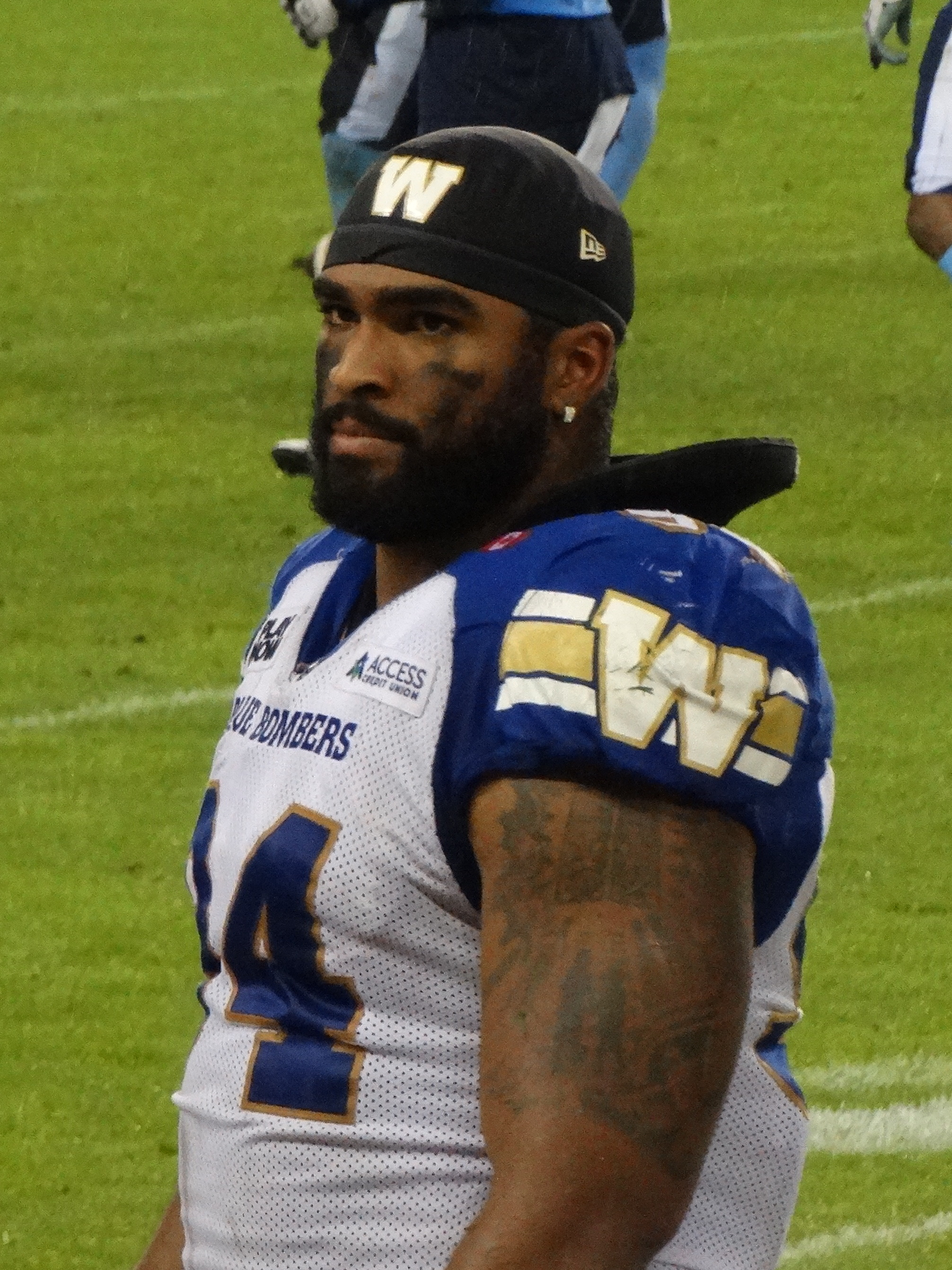
- Adams with the Winnipeg Blue Bombers in 2025

Saskatchewan Roughriders
- Position: Defensive lineman
- Roster status: Active
- CFL status: American

Personal information
- Born: November 11, 1998 (age 27); Pembroke Pines, Florida, U.S.
- Listed height: 6 ft 1 in (1.85 m)
- Listed weight: 285 lb (129 kg)

Career information
- High school: Miramar (Miramar, Florida)
- College: Peru State
- NFL draft: 2024: undrafted

Career history
- Winnipeg Blue Bombers (2024–2025); Saskatchewan Roughriders (2026–present)

Awards and highlights
- 2× First-team All-American (2021–2022); Third-team All-American (2023); 2× Heart North Defensive Player of the Year (2021–2022); 2× First-team All-Heart North (2021–2022)
- Stats at CFL.ca

Devin Adams (born November 11, 1998) is an American professional football defensive lineman for the Saskatchewan Roughriders of the Canadian Football League (CFL). He played college football at Delaware State and Peru State. He also doubled as a punter at Peru State.

== Early life ==
Devin Adams was born on November 11, 1998, in Pembroke Pines, Florida. He attended Miramar High School in Miramar, Florida.

== College football and baseball career ==
Adams first played college football for the FCS-level Delaware State Hornets of Delaware State University in 2017 as a linebacker. He also played on the baseball team at Delaware State. He played in 16 games for the Florida Pokers of the South Florida Collegiate Baseball League in 2018, recording a 3.54 ERA in 28 innings pitched.

After a hiatus, Adams played football for the NAIA-level Peru State Bobcats of Peru State College from 2021 to 2023. He played in nine games during the 2021 season, posting 23 solo tackles, 20 assisted tackles, seven sacks, and one pass breakup. He also doubled as the team's punter, punting 45 times for 1,868 yards and a 41.5 yard average while also completing four of five passes for 83 yards. For his performance during the 2021 season, Adams earned AFCA NAIA first-team All-American honors on defense, Heart of America Athletic Conference North Division Defensive Player of the Year, and first-team All-Heart honors as a punter.

Adams appeared in 11 games in 2022, totaling 33 solo tackles, 28 assisted tackles, 8.5 sacks, one forced fumble, three pass breakups, 66 punts for 2,582 yards (39.1 average), two of two passes for 78 yards, and eight rushing attempts for 95 yards. For 2022, Adams was named an Associated Press first-team NAIA All-American, an AFCA NAIA second-team All-American, the Heart North Defensive Player of the Year for the second straight year, and a first-team All-Heart punter honoree for the second year.

As a senior in 2023, Adams played in 11 games for the second consecutive season, posting 38 solo tackles, 14 assisted tackles, five sacks, one forced fumble, and one pass breakup while also punting 20 times for 775 yards. He garnered AFCA NAIA third-team All-American recognition.

== Professional career ==
After going undrafted in the 2024 NFL draft, Adams was invited to rookie minicamp on a tryout basis with the New England Patriots but was not signed. He signed with the Winnipeg Blue Bombers of the Canadian Football League on May 25, 2024. He was moved between the active roster, practice roster, and one-game injured list several times during the 2024 season. Adams dressed in 14 games, starting three, overall in 2024, recording 16 tackles on defense, one special teams tackle, and four sacks.

In 2025, Adams played in ten regular season games with Winnipeg and had nine defensive tackles and two sacks. He finished the season on the practice roster and his contract expired on November 2, 2025.

Following the end of the 2025 CFL season, Adams signed with the Saskatchewan Roughriders on December 17, 2025.
