= Emeric Boutin =

Canadian gridiron football player (born 2002)

No. 30 – Ottawa Redblacks
- Position: Fullback
- Roster status: Active
- CFL status: National

Personal information
- Born: July 26, 2002 (age 24)
- Listed height: 6 ft 2 in (1.88 m)
- Listed weight: 230 lb (104 kg)

Career information
- High school: Collège Lionel-Groulx
- University: Laval (2023–2025)
- CFL draft: 2026: 2nd round, 13th overall pick

Career history
- Ottawa Redblacks (2026–present)

Awards and highlights
- Vanier Cup champion (2024); 2× First-team All-Canadian (2024, 2025); 2× First-team RSEQ All-star (2024, 2025)
- Stats at CFL.ca

Emeric Boutin (born July 26, 2002) is a Canadian professional football fullback for the Ottawa Redblacks of the Canadian Football League (CFL). He played U Sports football for the Laval Rouge et Or.

== University career ==
Boutin played U Sports football for the Laval Rouge et Or from 2023 to 2025 at wide receiver. As a senior, he had nine receptions for 88 yards and one touchdown in nine games. Boutin was twice named a first-team All-Canadian in 2024 and 2025 and a RSEQ All-star in that same time.

== Professional career ==
Pre-draft measurables
Height	Weight	40-yard dash	20-yard shuttle	Vertical jump	Broad jump
6 ft 2 1/2 in (1.89 m)	230 lb (104 kg)	4.69 s	4.16 s	31 in (0.79 m)	10 ft 5 in (3.18 m)
All values from CFL Combine

Boutin was selected by the Ottawa Redblacks with the 13th overall pick in the second round of the 2026 CFL draft. On April 30, he signed with the team. Boutin started the season on the six-game injured list before he made his debut on July 31 against the Montreal Alouettes. On August 13, he was placed on the one-game injured list. On August 29, Boutin was moved back to the active roster.
