= Connor Shay =

American football player (born 2002)

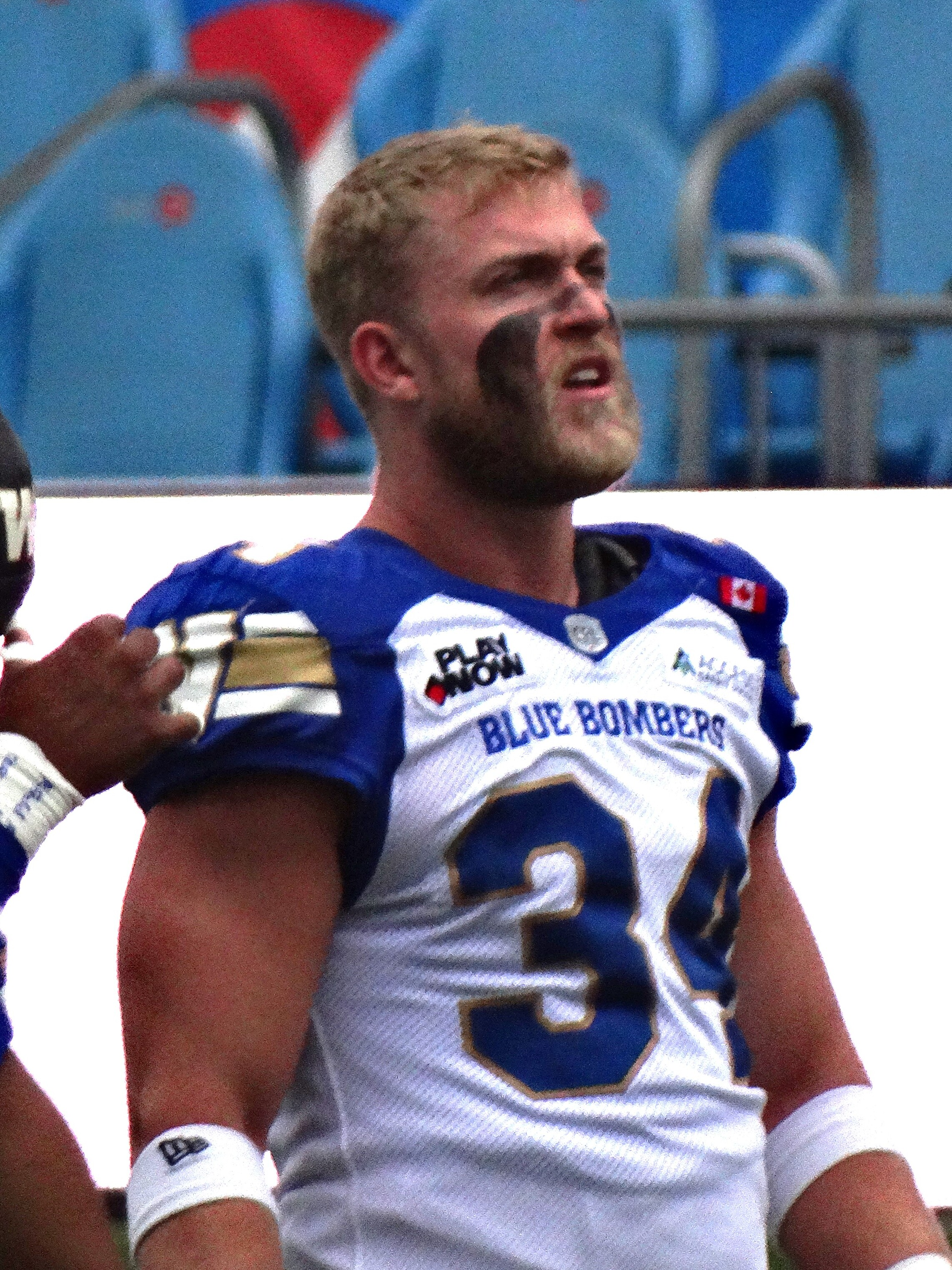
- Shay with the Winnipeg Blue Bombers in 2025

No. 34 – Winnipeg Blue Bombers
- Position: Linebacker
- Roster status: Active
- CFL status: National

Personal information
- Born: February 2, 2002 (age 24); Georgia, U.S.
- Listed height: 6 ft 1 in (1.85 m)
- Listed weight: 227 lb (103 kg)

Career information
- High school: Monte Vista (Danville, California)
- College: Wyoming (2020–2024)
- CFL draft: 2025: 1st round, 6th overall pick

Career history
- Winnipeg Blue Bombers (2025–present)
- Stats at CFL.ca

Connor Shay (born February 2, 2002) is an American-Canadian professional football linebacker for the Winnipeg Blue Bombers of the Canadian Football League (CFL). He played college football at Wyoming.

== Early life ==
Connor Shay was born on February 2, 2002, in the U.S. state of Georgia. He grew up playing baseball. In order to meet friends, he started playing football at Monte Vista High School in Danville, California. Shay was a tight end on the freshman team. He made the varsity team his sophomore year as a tight end and middle linebacker. He was also the punter his senior year. As a senior, Shay recorded 51 solo tackles, 83 assisted tackles, one sack, one forced fumble, 32 receptions for 419 yards and four touchdowns, and 42 punts for a 36.1 yard average. He earned San Francisco Chronicle first-team All-Metro honors at linebacker and was also named the Cal-Hi Sports North Coast Section (NCS) Defensive Player of the Year. He was rated a three-star recruit by 247Sports.com. Shay played four seasons of baseball at Monte Vista, with his senior season canceled due to COVID-19. He also played one season of basketball his senior year.

== College career ==
Shay received college football scholarship offers from Wyoming, Fresno State, Nevada, UNLV, and Utah. He committed to play for the Wyoming Cowboys of the University of Wyoming. He redshirted during the COVID-19 shortened 2020 season. In 2021, Shay played in 12 games as a backup linebacker and on special teams, posting one solo tackle and two assisted tackles. He appeared in 12 games again during the 2022 season, recording three assisted tackles while garnering Academic All-Mountain West recognition. Shay played in 13 games as a redshirt junior in 2023, posting eight solo tackles and seven assisted tackles. He started all 12 games at weakside linebacker his senior year in 2024, totaling 45 solo tackles, 31 assisted tackles, 1.5 sacks, one interception, and three pass breakups. He majored in communication at Wyoming.

== Professional career ==
Pre-draft measurables
| Height | Weight | Arm length | Hand span | Wingspan | 40-yard dash | 10-yard split | 20-yard split | 20-yard shuttle | Three-cone drill | Vertical jump | Broad jump |
|---|---|---|---|---|---|---|---|---|---|---|---|
| 6 ft 1 1/2 in (1.87 m) | 227 lb (103 kg) | 30 1/4 in (0.77 m) | 9 in (0.23 m) | 6 ft 1 5/8 in (1.87 m) | 4.59 s | 1.60 s | 2.70 s | 4.32 s | 6.95 s | 38.5 in (0.98 m) | 10 ft 3 in (3.12 m) |
All values from Pro Day

After going undrafted in the 2025 NFL draft, Shay was invited to rookie minicamp on a tryout basis with both the Green Bay Packers and New York Jets. He was also selected by the Winnipeg Blue Bombers with the sixth overall pick in the 2025 CFL draft. Shay qualified for national status in the CFL due to his father being born in Charlottetown, Prince Edward Island. He officially signed with the Blue Bombers on May 13, 2025.
