= Jaylen Smith (linebacker) =

Canadian football player (born 2002)

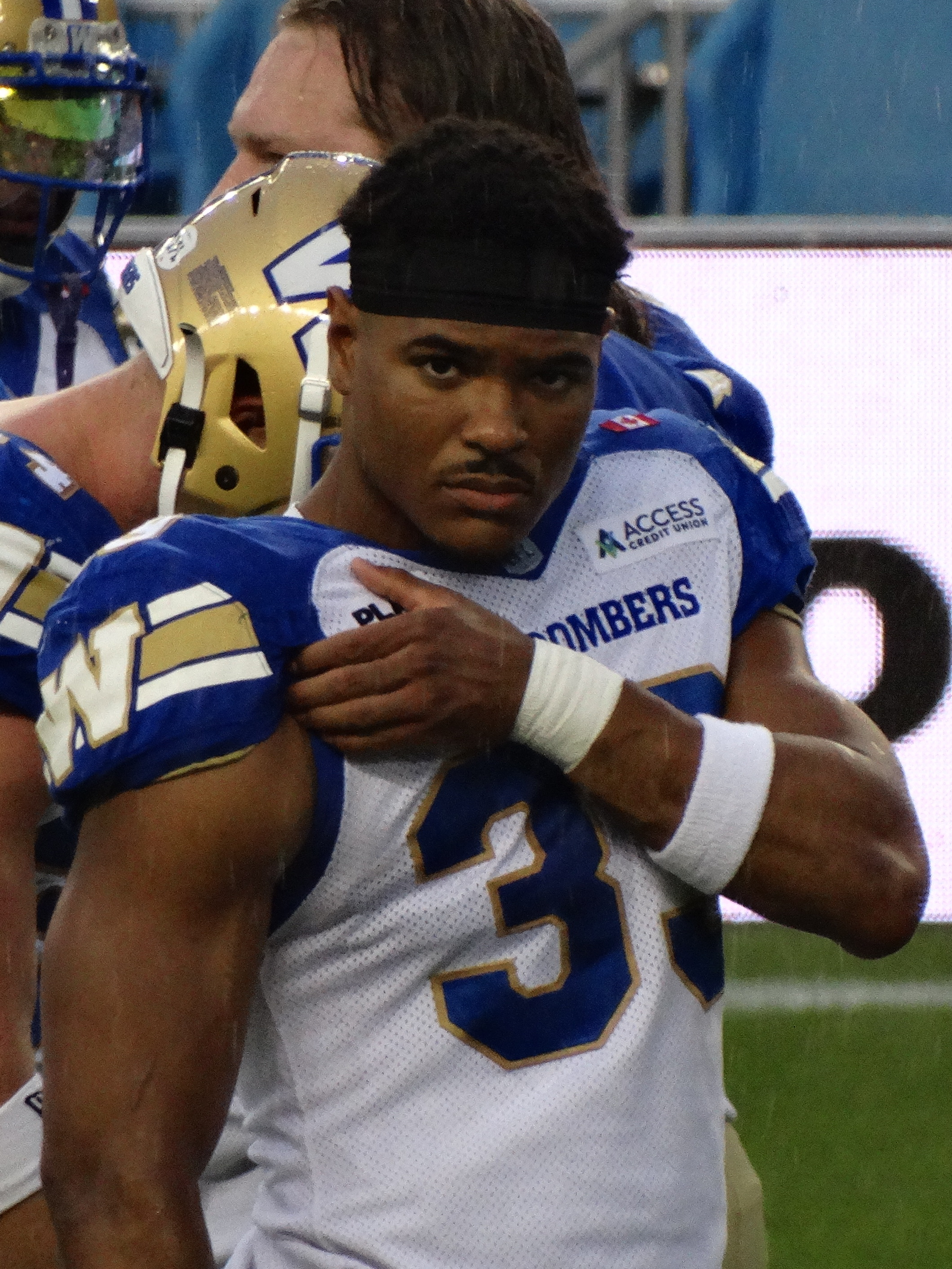
- Smith with the Winnipeg Blue Bombers in 2025

No. 39 – Winnipeg Blue Bombers
- Position: Linebacker
- Roster status: Active
- CFL status: National

Personal information
- Born: March 1, 2002 (age 24)
- Listed height: 5 ft 10 in (1.78 m)
- Listed weight: 228 lb (103 kg)

Career information
- High school: IMG Academy (Bradenton, Florida)
- College: North Texas
- CFL draft: 2025: 2nd round, 15th overall pick

Career history
- Winnipeg Blue Bombers (2025–present)

Awards and highlights
- Third-team All-AAC (2024)
- Stats at CFL.ca

Jaylen Smith (born March 1, 2002) is a Canadian professional football linebacker for the Winnipeg Blue Bombers of the Canadian Football League (CFL). He played college football at North Texas.

== Early life ==
Jaylen Smith was born on March 1, 2002. He left his hometown of Hamilton, Ontario, after graduating from high school. He then spent a postgraduate year at St. Thomas More School in Oakdale, Connecticut, but the season was abbreviated due to the COVID-19 pandemic. Smith then spent another postgrad season at IMG Academy in Bradenton, Florida.

== College career ==
Smith played college football for the North Texas Mean Green of the University of North Texas from 2021 to 2024, initially joining the team as a walk-on. He began his college career as a defensive back. Smith played in 13 games during the 2021 season, mostly on special teams, posting eight solo tackles and six assisted tackles. He led the team with 12 special teams tackles. He played in all 14 games, mostly on special teams again, in 2022, recording seven solo tackles and eight assisted tackles. Smith appeared in 12 games, starting four, in 2023, totaling 16 solo tackles, nine assisted tackles, 0.5 sacks, one forced fumble, one interception, and one pass breakup. He started all 13 games at outside linebacker as a senior in 2024, recording 44 solo tackles, 62 assisted tackles, one interception, and two pass breakups. He led the team in tackles, earning Dave Campbell's Texas Football second-team All-Texas and third-team All-American Athletic Conference honors.

== Professional career ==
Pre-draft measurables
Height	Weight	Arm length	Hand span	Wingspan
5 ft 11 in (1.80 m)	222 lb (101 kg)	31 in (0.79 m)	7 3/4 in (0.20 m)	6 ft 2 3/8 in (1.89 m)
All values from Pro Day

Smith was selected by the Winnipeg Blue Bombers in the second round, with the 15th overall pick, of the 2025 CFL draft. He officially signed with the team on May 5, 2025.
