= Jackson Findlay =

Canadian football player (born 2003)

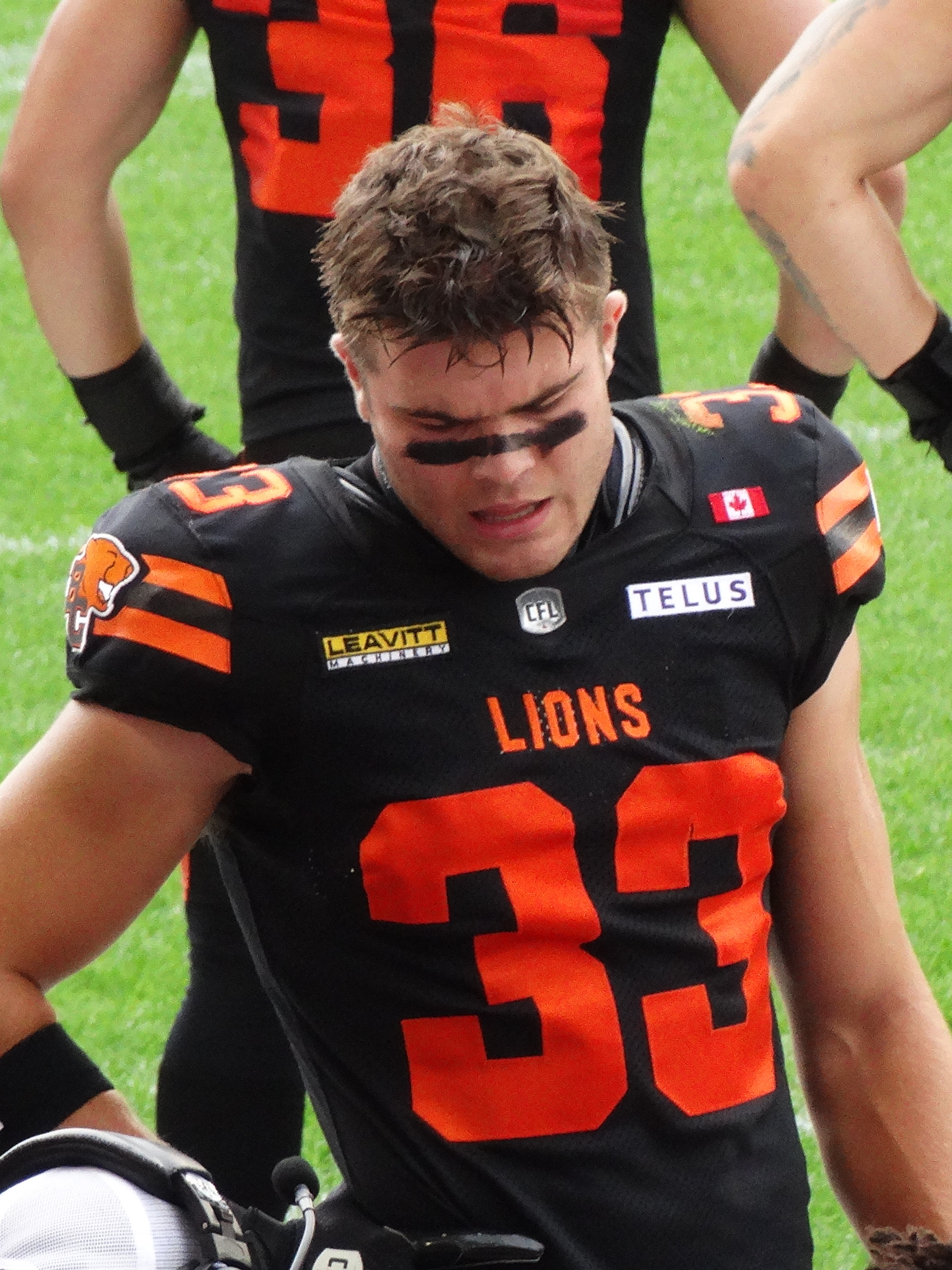
- Findlay with the BC Lions in 2025

No. 33 – BC Lions
- Position: Defensive back
- Roster status: Active
- CFL status: National

Personal information
- Born: December 22, 2003 (age 22); North Vancouver, British Columbia, Canada
- Listed height: 6 ft 2 in (1.88 m)
- Listed weight: 207 lb (94 kg)

Career information
- High school: Vancouver College
- University: Western
- CFL draft: 2025: 2nd round, 16th overall pick

Career history
- BC Lions (2025–present)

Awards and highlights
- CFL West All-Star (2026); First-team All-Canadian (2023); OUA Defensive Player of the Year (2024)
- Stats at CFL.ca

Jackson Findlay (born December 22, 2003) is a Canadian professional football player who is a defensive back for the BC Lions of the Canadian Football League (CFL). He played U Sports football for the Western Mustangs.

== Early life ==
Jackson Findlay was born on December 22, 2003, in North Vancouver, British Columbia. For high school, he attended Vancouver College.

== University career ==
Findlay played U Sports football for the Western Mustangs of University of Western Ontario. He recorded career totals of 97 solo tackles, 85 assisted tackles, eight interceptions, four sacks, one forced fumble, and one fumble recovery in 41 games played. He was a two-time Ontario University Athletics (OUA) first-team All-Star, and was the OUA Defensive Player of the Year in 2024. He was a Presidents' Trophy finalist in 2024. Findlay was named one of U Sports' top 8 Academic All-Canadians for the 2024–25 school year. He was a medical sciences student at Western, attending the Schulich School of Medicine and Dentistry. He was also president of the Western athletic student council and a coach for the women's flag football team.

== Professional career ==
Pre-draft measurables
Height	Weight	40-yard dash	20-yard shuttle	Three-cone drill	Vertical jump	Broad jump	Bench press
6 ft 2 1/2 in (1.89 m)	207 lb (94 kg)	4.57 s	4.20 s	6.88 s	33.0 in (0.84 m)	10 ft 4 1/4 in (3.16 m)	14 reps
All values from CFL Combine

At the 2025 CFL Combine, Findlay posted top ten rankings in the broad jump (eighth place at 10' 4¼") and the 40-yard dash (10th place at 4.57 seconds). He was selected by the BC Lions in the second round, with the 16th overall pick, of the 2025 CFL draft. He officially signed with the team on May 5, 2025. Findlay was placed on the one-game injured list on June 27, and activated from the injured list on July 4. He dressed in 17 games, starting four, for the Lions during the 2025 season, recording 26 tackles on defense, 12 special teams tackles, four interceptions for seven yards, and two pass breakups.

== Personal life ==
Findlay is a fourth-generation CFL player. His great-grandfather Stephen Findlay played for the Hamilton Tigers in the 23rd Grey Cup in 1935. His grandfather Greg Findlay was an all-star linebacker for the BC Lions from 1962 to 1973. His father Anthony Findlay played one game for the Saskatchewan Roughriders in 1994. Jackson's uncle Brooks Findlay also played in the CFL.
