= Erik Andersen (Canadian football) =

Canadian gridiron football player (born 2001)

No. 61 – Saskatchewan Roughriders
- Position: Offensive lineman
- Roster status: Practice roster
- CFL status: National

Personal information
- Born: February 10, 2001 (age 25)
- Listed height: 6 ft 6 in (1.98 m)
- Listed weight: 314 lb (142 kg)

Career information
- High school: A. B. Lucas (London, Ontario)
- University: Western (2020–2025)
- CFL draft: 2025: 2nd round, 13th overall pick

Career history
- Saskatchewan Roughriders (2025–present)

Awards and highlights
- Vanier Cup champion (2021); J. P. Metras Trophy (2025); 3× First-team All-Canadian (2023–2025); 3× First-team OUA All-Star (2023–2025); 2× Second-team OUA All-Star (2021, 2022)
- Stats at CFL.ca

Erik Andersen (born February 10, 2001) is a Canadian professional football offensive lineman who plays for the Saskatchewan Roughriders of the Canadian Football League (CFL). He played U Sports football for the Western Mustangs.

== Early life ==
Anderson was born on February 10, 2001. He attended A. B. Lucas Secondary School in London, Ontario.

== University career ==
Anderson played U Sports football for the Western Mustangs from 2020 to 2025. He played in 46 games, starting in 20, at left tackle. Anderson was a three-time first-team All-Canadian and Ontario University Athletics All-Star in his last three seasons along with winning the J. P. Metras Trophy in 2025. He also earned two second-team OUA All-Star selections his first two seasons and the Vanier Cup in 2021.

== Professional career ==
Pre-draft measurables
Height	Weight	Arm length	Hand span	Wingspan	40-yard dash	10-yard split	20-yard split	20-yard shuttle	Three-cone drill	Vertical jump	Broad jump	Bench press
6 ft 6 in (1.98 m)	306 lb (139 kg)	31 7/8 in (0.81 m)	9 7/8 in (0.25 m)	6 ft 8 1/8 in (2.04 m)	5.32 s	1.90 s	3.08 s	5.09 s	7.95 s	26.5 in (0.67 m)	7 ft 9 in (2.36 m)	17 reps
All values from Pro day

Anderson was selected in the second round, with the 13th overall selection, by the Saskatchewan Roughriders in the 2025 CFL draft. On May 11, he officially signed with the team. Anderson spent the training camp with the team and returned to University of Western Ontario to finish his eligibility. On November 28, he was re-signed by the Roughriders.

On June 13, 2026, Anderson made his CFL debut against the BC Lions. On June 19, he was assigned to the practice roster. On July 31, Anderson was promoted to the active roster as the sixth lineman. After the game, he reverted to the practice roster but was re-signed on August 6. Anderson made his first start at left guard on August 13 against the Ottawa Redblacks. He only became aware that he would be starting hours before kickoff after the starter, Daniel Johnson fell ill.
