= Mack Bannatyne =

Canadian football player (born 2001)

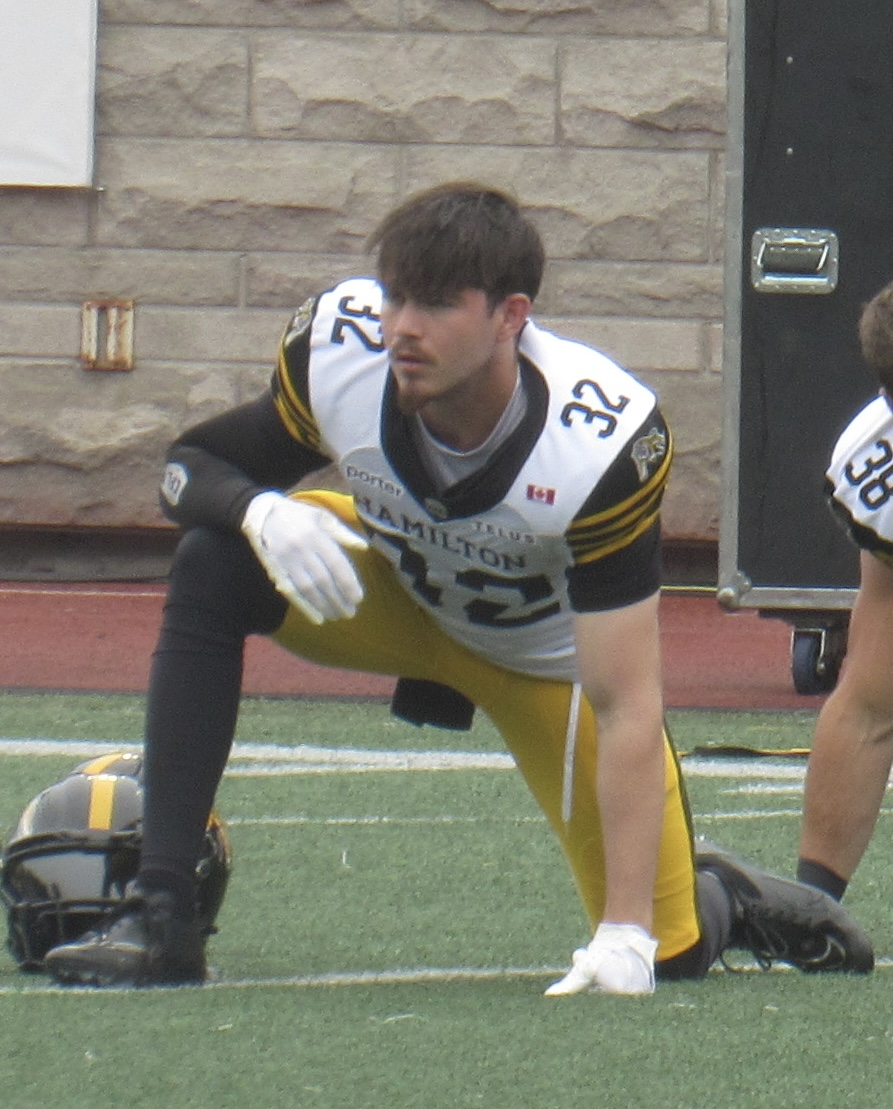
- Bannatyne with the Hamilton Tiger-Cats in 2025

No. 32
- Position: Defensive back

Personal information
- Born: August 21, 2001 (age 25)
- Listed height: 5 ft 11 in (1.80 m)
- Listed weight: 195 lb (88 kg)

Career information
- High school: Ernest Manning (Calgary)
- University: York (2020–2022); Alberta (2023–2024)
- CFL draft: 2025: 3rd round, 28th overall pick

Career history
- Hamilton Tiger-Cats (2025)

Awards and highlights
- Second-team All-Canadian (2024); Canada West All-Star (2024)
- Stats at CFL.ca

Mack Bannatyne (born August 21, 2001) is a Canadian former professional football defensive back who played for the Hamilton Tiger-Cats of the Canadian Football League (CFL). He played U Sports football at Alberta.

== Early life ==
Mack Bannatyne was born on August 21, 2001. He grew up a Calgary Stampeders fan. He attended Ernest Manning High School in Calgary. Bannatyne represented Ernest Manning High at Alberta’s 2019 Senior Bowl as a member of the South team. He played for the Calgary Colts of the Canadian Junior Football League during the 2019 season and was named the team's rookie of the year after posting 15 solo tackles, ten assisted tackles, and one interception.

== University career ==
Bannatyne first played U Sports football for the York Lions of York University. The 2020 U Sports football season was cancelled due to the COVID-19 pandemic. He studied commerce and finance at York. Bannatyne was named an academic all-Canadian for the 2020–21 school year. He started all six games during the 2021 season, totaling ten solo tackles, six assisted tackles, three pass breakups, and two interceptions, one of which he returned 64 yards for a touchdown. He started seven of eight of York's games in 2022, recording 35 solo tackles, 11 assisted tackles, and three pass breakups.

Bannatyne transferred to the University of Alberta to play for the Alberta Golden Bears from 2023 to 2024. He appeared in nine games during the 2023 season, posting 24 tackles (all solo), two interceptions for 97 yards and one touchdown, and five pass breakups. He played in eight games as a senior in 2024, totaling 33 solo tackles, eight assisted tackles, one interception, five pass breakups, and two fumble recoveries. Bannatyne was named a Canada West All-Star at defensive halfback for his performance during the 2024 season. He studied business at Alberta.

== Professional career ==
Pre-draft measurables
Height	Weight	40-yard dash	20-yard shuttle	Three-cone drill	Vertical jump	Broad jump	Bench press
5 ft 11 1/8 in (1.81 m)	195 lb (88 kg)	4.54 s	4.22 s	7.16 s	31.0 in (0.79 m)	10 ft 0 in (3.05 m)	16 reps
All values from CFL Combine

Bannatyne was selected by the Hamilton Tiger-Cats in the third round, with the 28th overall pick, of the 2025 CFL draft. He officially signed with the team on May 2. He made his CFL debut in the 2025 season opener against his hometown team, the Stampeders, posting one tackle on defense and one tackle on special teams. Bannatyne was moved to the practice roster on October 2 and placed on the one-game injured list on October 23, 2025. He dressed in 15 games, starting one, overall during the 2025 season as a safety/cornerback, recording eight defensive tackles and five special teams tackles. He retired on May 13, 2026.
