= Alassane Diouf =

Canadian gridiron football player (born 2001)

No. 65 – Ottawa Redblacks
- Position: Offensive lineman
- Roster status: Active
- CFL status: National

Personal information
- Born: December 31, 2001 (age 24)
- Listed height: 6 ft 2 in (1.88 m)
- Listed weight: 302 lb (137 kg)

Career information
- High school: Champlain College Lennoxville (Sherbrooke, Quebec)
- University: Montreal (2022–2025)
- CFL draft: 2026: 5th round, 39th overall pick

Career history
- Ottawa Redblacks (2026–present)

Awards and highlights
- 2× Vanier Cup champion (2023, 2025); 3× First-team All-Canadian (2023–2025); 3× First-team RSEQ All-Star (2023–2025)
- Stats at CFL.ca

Alassane Diouf (born December 31, 2001) is a Canadian professional football offensive lineman for the Ottawa Redblacks of the Canadian Football League (CFL). He played U Sports football for the Montreal Carabins.

== Early life ==
Diouf was born on December 31, 2001. He attended Champlain College Lennoxville in Sherbrooke, Quebec.

== University career ==
Diouf played U Sports football for the Montreal Carabins from 2022 to 2025. In four seasons, he played in 32 games at left guard, earning first-team RSEQ All-Star and All-Canadian honors from 2023 to 2025. Diouf also was the RSEQ Offensive Lineman of the Year in 2025.

== Professional career ==
Pre-draft measurables
Height	Weight	Bench press
6 ft 1 5/8 in (1.87 m)	302 lb (137 kg)	21 reps
All values from CFL Combine

Diouf was selected in the fifth round, with the 39th overall selection, by the Ottawa Redblacks in the 2026 CFL draft. On April 30, he officially signed with the team. On May 31, Diouf was assigned to the practice roster. On June 27, he was elevated to the active roster for the first time as a reserve. On June 30, Diouf reverted to the practice roster. On August 13, he was promoted again to the active roster.
