= Lane Novak =

Canadian football player (born 2002)

- Novak with the Winnipeg Blue Bombers in 2026

No. 48 – Winnipeg Blue Bombers
- Position: Linebacker
- Roster status: Active
- CFL status: National

Personal information
- Born: May 21, 2002 (age 24)
- Listed height: 6 ft 1 in (1.85 m)
- Listed weight: 225 lb (102 kg)

Career information
- High school: Greenall (Balgonie, Saskatchewan)
- University: Saskatchewan
- CFL draft: 2025: 5th round, 45th overall pick

Career history
- Winnipeg Blue Bombers (2025–present)
- Stats at CFL.ca

Lane Novak (born May 21, 2002) is a Canadian professional football linebacker for the Winnipeg Blue Bombers of the Canadian Football League (CFL). He played U Sports football at Saskatchewan.

== Early life ==
Lane Novak was born May 21, 2002. He grew up a Saskatchewan Roughriders fan. He played high school football at Greenall School in Balgonie, Saskatchewan. Novak helped Greenall win the Regina 5A City Championship in 2018. He was a member of the U18 Team Saskatchewan in 2018 and 2019, helping Saskatchewan win the Canada Cup both years.

== University career ==
Novak played U Sports football for the Saskatchewan Huskies of the University of Saskatchewan from 2021 to 2024. The 2020 U Sports football season was cancelled due to the COVID-19 pandemic. He was named an Academic All-Canadian in 2020, and also represented Canada at the 2020 International Bowl. Novak played in ten games in 2021, recording 37 solo tackles, nine assisted tackles, one sack, one fumble recovery, two interceptions, and two pass breakups, earning Academic All-Canadian honors for the second straight year. He also helped the Huskies win the 2021 Uteck Bowl. He played in 12 games during the 2022 season, posting 49 solo tackles, 30 assisted tackles, one sack, one forced fumble, and four pass breakups. Novak appeared in seven games in 2023, totaling 29 solo tackles, 18 assisted tackles, 0.5 sacks, one fumble recovery, and one pass breakup. As a senior in 2024, he played in nine games while recording 32 solo tackles, 18 assisted tackles, two forced fumbles, one interception, and three pass breakups.

== Professional career ==
Pre-draft measurables
Height	Weight	40-yard dash	20-yard shuttle	Three-cone drill	Vertical jump	Broad jump	Bench press
6 ft 0 3/4 in (1.85 m)	229 lb (104 kg)	4.77 s	4.20 s	7.13 s	29.0 in (0.74 m)	9 ft 1 5/8 in (2.78 m)	13 reps
All values from CFL Combine

Novak was selected by the Winnipeg Blue Bombers in the fifth round, with the 45th overall pick, of the 2025 CFL draft. He officially signed with the team on May 2, 2025. He practiced long snapping during training camp in order to improve his odds of making the team. Novak made the regular season roster and played on special teams before being placed on the six-game injured list on July 25, 2025.

== Personal life ==
Novak volunteers with KidSport, which provides financial assistance to help kids play sports.
