= 2025 CFL draft =

Canadian football player selection

General information
- Sport: Canadian football
- Date: April 29, 2025
- Time: 6:00 pm EDT
- Location: Toronto, Ontario
- Networks: TSN; RDS; TSN+

Overview
- 72 total selections in 8 rounds
- League: Canadian Football League
- First selection: Damien Alford, Calgary Stampeders
- Most selections (10): Calgary Stampeders
- Fewest selections (7): Ottawa Redblacks; Edmonton Elks; Saskatchewan Roughriders; BC Lions
- U Sports selections: 49
- NCAA selections: 23

The 2025 CFL national draft was a selection of national players by Canadian Football League teams that took place on April 29, 2025 at 6:00 pm ET. Seventy-two players were chosen from among eligible players from Canadian Universities across the country, as well as Canadian players playing in the NCAA.

== Format ==
As per the 2022 collective bargaining agreement, the two teams that had National players featured in the highest percentage of snaps played in the 2024 CFL season were each awarded an additional second-round pick. The Winnipeg Blue Bombers and BC Lions were awarded these selections for the second consecutive year.

== Top prospects ==
Final ranking	January ranking	August ranking	Player	Position	University	Hometown
1	3	-	Elic Ayomanor	Wide receiver	Stanford	Medicine Hat, AB
2	1	1	Kurtis Rourke	Quarterback	Indiana	Oakville, ON
3	2	3	Paris Shand	Defensive lineman	LSU	Toronto, ON
4	-	-	Connor Shay	Linebacker	Wyoming	Danville, CA
5	5	10	Keelan White	Wide receiver	Montana	North Vancouver, BC
6	-	-	Tiger Shanks	Offensive lineman	UNLV	Lake Oswego, OR
7	-	2	Damien Alford	Wide receiver	Utah	Montreal, QC
8	13	19	Darien Newell	Defensive lineman	Queen's	Brampton, ON
9	9	-	Hayden Harris	Defensive lineman	Montana	Mill Creek, WA
10	11	-	Christopher Fortin	Offensive lineman	Connecticut	Saint-René, QC
11	12	-	Ali Saad	Defensive lineman	Bowling Green	Windsor, ON
12	4	8	Isaiah Bagnah	Defensive lineman	BYU	Lethbridge, AB
13	8	5	Jackson Findlay	Defensive back	Western	North Vancouver, BC
14	20	-	Taylor Elgersma	Quarterback	Wilfrid Laurier	London, ON
15	6	20	Jaylen Smith	Defensive back	North Texas	Hamilton, ON
16	7	14	Jeremiah Ojo	Defensive lineman	Montreal	Montreal, QC
17	17	-	Samuel Carson	Offensive lineman	Louisiana–Monroe	Calgary, AB
18	10	17	Erik Andersen	Offensive lineman	Western	London, ON
19	15	15	Devin Veresuk	Linebacker	Windsor	Windsor, ON
20	19	-	Nate Beauchemin	Defensive back	Calgary	Kelowna, BC
-	14	16	Nate Martey	Defensive lineman	Arkansas State	Ottawa, ON
-	16	-	Ethan Jordan	Wide receiver	Wilfrid Laurier	Chatham, ON
-	18	-	Isaiah Knight	Running back	British Columbia	Ottawa, ON
-	-	4	Eric Schon (Note: Schon retired after the 2024 college football season.)	Offensive lineman	Duke	Barrie, ON
-	-	6	Nolan Ulm (Note: Ulm, Mesidor, Bailey, Elad, and Konga all reclassified to 2026.)	Wide receiver	Eastern Washington	Kelowna, BC
-	-	7	Akheem Mesidor	Defensive lineman	Miami (FL)	Ottawa, ON
-	-	9	Wesley Bailey	Defensive lineman	Rutgers	Ottawa, ON
-	-	11	Jett Elad	Defensive back	UNLV	Mississauga, ON
-	-	12	Rene Konga	Defensive lineman	Louisville	Ottawa, ON
-	-	13	Devynn Cromwell	Defensive back	Texas Tech	Toronto, ON
-	-	18	Harold Miessan	Linebacker	Montreal	Montreal, QC

== Draft order ==
=== Round one ===
Pick #	CFL team	Player	Position	University
1	Calgary Stampeders	Damien Alford	WR	Utah
2	Hamilton Tiger-Cats	Devin Veresuk	LB	Windsor
—N/a	Edmonton Elks	Selection forfeited		
—N/a	BC Lions	Selection forfeited		
3	Ottawa Redblacks	Keelan White	WR	Montana
4	Saskatchewan Roughriders	Ali Saad	DL	Bowling Green
5	Montreal Alouettes	Tiger Shanks	OL	UNLV
6	Winnipeg Blue Bombers	Connor Shay	LB	Wyoming
7	Toronto Argonauts	Jeremiah Ojo	DL	Montreal
8	Calgary Stampeders (via BC forfeiture)	Christopher Fortin	OL	Connecticut

=== Round two ===
Pick #	CFL team	Player	Position	University
—N/a	BC Lions (via Calgary)	Selection forfeited		
9	Hamilton Tiger-Cats	Isaiah Bagnah	DL	BYU
10	Edmonton Elks	Darien Newell	DL	Queen's
11	BC Lions	Hayden Harris	DL	Montana
12	Ottawa Redblacks	Samuel Carson	OL	Louisiana–Monroe
13	Saskatchewan Roughriders	Erik Andersen	OL	Western
14	Montreal Alouettes	Nate Beauchemin	DB	Calgary
15	Winnipeg Blue Bombers	Jaylen Smith	DB	North Texas
16	BC Lions (via Toronto)	Jackson Findlay	DB	Western
17	Calgary Stampeders (via BC forfeiture)	Quincy Vaughn	TE	North Dakota
18N	Winnipeg Blue Bombers	Taylor Elgersma	QB	Wilfrid Laurier
19N	Toronto Argonauts (via BC)	Paris Shand	DL	LSU

=== Round three ===
Pick #	CFL team	Player	Position	University
20	Calgary Stampeders	Anton Haie	DB	Laval
21	Hamilton Tiger-Cats	Arvin Hosseini	OL	British Columbia
22	Edmonton Elks	Skyler Griffith	TE	British Columbia
23	Montreal Alouettes (via BC)	Gabriel Lessard	LB	Montreal
24	Edmonton Elks (via Ottawa)	Isaiah Knight	RB	British Columbia
25	Saskatchewan Roughriders	Kurtis Rourke	QB	Indiana
26	Montreal Alouettes	Hakeem Harris	WR	Davenport
27	Winnipeg Blue Bombers	Ethan Vibert	OL	South Dakota State
28	Hamilton Tiger-Cats (via Toronto)	Mack Bannatyne	DB	Alberta

=== Round four ===
Pick #	CFL team	Player	Position	University
29	Toronto Argonauts (via Calgary and BC)	Gavin Coakes	OL	British Columbia
30	Toronto Argonauts (via Hamilton)	Istvan Assibo-Dadzie	DB	Windsor
31	Edmonton Elks	Silas Hubert	DL	Queen's
32	Calgary Stampeders (via BC)	Nicky Farinaccio	LB	Montreal
33	Ottawa Redblacks	Muftah Ageli	DL	Northwestern Oklahoma State
34	Saskatchewan Roughriders	Seth Hundeby	LB	Saskatchewan
35	Montreal Alouettes	Keanu Yazbeck	RB	Western
36	Hamilton Tiger-Cats (via Winnipeg)	Ty Anderson	DL	Alberta
37	BC Lions (via Toronto)	Connor Klassen	OL	Regina

=== Round five ===
Pick #	CFL team	Player	Position	University
38	Calgary Stampeders	Vyshonne Janusas	WR	Guelph
39	Winnipeg Blue Bombers (via Hamilton)	Joey Corcoran	WR	New Hampshire
40	Edmonton Elks	Domenico Piazza	OL	McGill
41	BC Lions	Dre Doiron	OL	Kansas
42	Ottawa Redblacks	Eric Cumberbatch	DB	Ottawa
43	Saskatchewan Roughriders	Liam Hoskins	LB	Windsor
44	Montreal Alouettes	Gabriel Maisonneuve	DL	Montreal
45	Winnipeg Blue Bombers	Lane Novak	LB	Saskatchewan
46	Toronto Argonauts	Jaylen Rayam	LB	UTEP

=== Round six ===
Pick #	CFL team	Player	Position	University
47	Calgary Stampeders	Ludovick Choquette	RB	Long Island
48	Hamilton Tiger-Cats	Ronan Horrall	DB	British Columbia
49	Edmonton Elks	Daniel Hocevar	OL	Guelph
50	BC Lions	Chase Tataryn	LB	Alberta
51	Ottawa Redblacks	Ethan Jordan	WR	Wilfrid Laurier
52	Saskatchewan Roughriders	Gideon Agyei	DB	Calgary
53	Montreal Alouettes	Isaac Gaillaretz	WR	Laval
54	Winnipeg Blue Bombers	Ethan Ball	DB	Calgary
55	Toronto Argonauts	Joey Zorn	RB	Windsor

=== Round seven ===
Pick #	CFL team	Player	Position	University
56	Calgary Stampeders	Matthew Stokman	OL	Manitoba
57	Hamilton Tiger-Cats	Jake Nitychoruk	DB	Manitoba
58	Edmonton Elks	Kolby Hurford	WR	Alberta
59	BC Lions	Alex Berwick	OL	Western
60	Ottawa Redblacks	Jayden Griffiths	LB	Wilfrid Laurier
61	Calgary Stampeders (via Saskatchewan)	Max von Muehldorfer	DL	Western
62	Montreal Alouettes	Jonathan Sénécal	QB	Montreal
63	Winnipeg Blue Bombers	Trey Laing	DL	Eastern Michigan
64	Toronto Argonauts	Ethan Pyle	OL	Guelph

=== Round eight ===
Pick #	CFL team	Player	Position	University
65	Calgary Stampeders	Ashton Miller-Melancon	DB	Queen's
66	Hamilton Tiger-Cats	Nate Martey	DL	Arkansas State
—N/a	Edmonton Elks	Selection forfeited		
67	BC Lions	Luka Stoikos	RB	Toronto
68	Ottawa Redblacks	King Ambers	DB	East Texas A&M
69	Saskatchewan Roughriders	Daniel Wiebe	WR	Saskatchewan
70	Montreal Alouettes	Riley MacLeod	LB	Western
71	Winnipeg Blue Bombers	Iwinosa Uwubanmwen	OL	Alberta
72	Toronto Argonauts	DeEmetrius Masuka	DB	McMaster

== Trades ==
In the explanations below, (D) denotes trades that took place during the draft, while (PD) indicates trades completed pre-draft.

=== Round two ===
- Calgary → BC (PD). Calgary traded the ninth overall pick and the 29th overall pick in this year's draft and a second-round pick in the 2026 CFL draft to BC in exchange for Vernon Adams, the 32nd overall pick in this year's draft, and a third-round pick in the 2026 CFL draft.
- Toronto ↔ BC (D). Toronto traded the 16th and 37th overall picks to BC in exchange for the 19th and 29th overall picks.

=== Round three ===
- Ottawa → Edmonton (PD). Ottawa traded a third-round pick in this year's draft to Edmonton in exchange for Peter Adjey.
- BC → Montreal (PD). BC traded a third-round pick in this year's draft to Montreal in exchange for Jeshrun Antwi.
- Toronto → Hamilton (PD). Toronto traded a conditional fourth-round pick in this year's draft, Jordan Williams, and the seventh overall selection, a second-round pick, and a fourth-round pick in the 2024 CFL draft to Hamilton in exchange for a conditional third-round pick in this year's draft, the fifth overall selection and two third-round picks in the 2024 CFL draft, and the negotiation rights to Deontay Burnett. The condition was not met and Toronto traded a third-round pick instead.

=== Round four ===
- Calgary ↔ BC (PD). Calgary traded the 29th overall pick and the ninth overall pick in this year's draft and a second-round pick in the 2026 CFL draft to BC in exchange for Vernon Adams, the 32nd overall pick in this year's draft, and a third-round pick in the 2026 CFL draft.
- Hamilton → Toronto (PD). Hamilton traded a conditional third-round pick in this year's draft, the fifth overall selection and two third-round picks in the 2024 CFL draft, and the negotiation rights to Deontay Burnett to Toronto in exchange for Jordan Williams, the seventh overall selection, a second-round pick, and a fourth-round pick in the 2024 CFL draft, and a conditional fourth-round pick in this year's draft. The condition was not met and Hamilton traded a fourth-round pick instead.
- Winnipeg → Hamilton (PD). Winnipeg traded the 36th overall pick in this year's draft, the eighth overall pick in the 2025 CFL global draft, and Kyle Samson to Hamilton in exchange for Matthew Peterson, the 39th overall pick in this year's draft, and the second overall pick in the 2025 CFL global draft.
- Toronto ↔ BC (D). Toronto traded the 16th and 37th overall picks to BC in exchange for the 19th and 29th overall picks.

=== Round five ===
- Hamilton → Winnipeg (PD). Hamilton traded the 39th overall pick in this year's draft, the second overall pick in the 2025 CFL global draft, and Matthew Peterson to Winnipeg in exchange for Kyle Samson, the 36th overall pick in this year's draft, and the eighth overall pick in the 2025 CFL global draft.

=== Round seven ===
- Saskatchewan → Calgary (PD). Saskatchewan traded an eighth-round pick in this year's draft to Calgary in exchange for Jake Maier. This became a seventh-round pick when Maier re-signed with Saskatchewan on January 9, 2025.

== Forfeitures ==
=== Supplemental draft ===
- Edmonton forfeited their first-round pick after selecting Zach Mathis in the 2024 supplemental draft.
- Edmonton forfeited their eighth-round pick after selecting Antonio Alfano in the 2024 supplemental draft.

=== Salary cap ===
- BC forfeited the highest of their first-round and second-round picks (third and ninth overall) after exceeding the salary cap by more than $300,000 ($347,889). As the team with the highest priority waiver, Calgary was awarded BC's forfeited selections at the end of the first and second rounds (eighth and 17th overall).
