= 2025 U Sports football season =

- League: U Sports
- Sport: Canadian football
- Duration: August 22 – October 25, 2025

Playoffs
- Hardy Cup champions: Saskatchewan Huskies
- Yates Cup champions: Queen's Gaels
- Jacques Dussault Cup champions: Montreal Carabins
- Loney Bowl champions: St. Mary's Huskies
- Mitchell Bowl champions: Saskatchewan Huskies
- Uteck Bowl champions: Montreal Carabins

Vanier Cup
- Date: November 22, 2025
- Venue: Mosaic Stadium (Regina, Saskatchewan)
- Champions: Montreal Carabins

Seasons
- 2024 2026

The 2025 U Sports football season began on August 22 with the McGill Redbirds hosting the Sherbrooke Vert et Or and the Saint Mary's Huskies playing host to the Acadia Axemen. On the following day, ten Ontario University Athletics teams opened their schedules on August 23. The Canada West conference began their season one week later on August 28.

The conference championships were played on the weekend of November 8, and the season ended on November 22 with the 60th Vanier Cup championship. The Vanier Cup game was held at Mosaic Stadium in Regina, Saskatchewan. 27 university teams in Canada played U Sports football, the highest level of amateur Canadian football.

== Schedules ==
On January 30, 2025, the RSEQ released their schedule which featured no major changes from the 2024 season, with five teams playing eight regular season games over ten weeks. The regular season started on August 22 and ended on October 25. The Jacques Dussault Cup game was played on November 8. The OUA next announced their schedule on March 27, 2025, which featured 11 teams playing over nine weeks from August 23 to October 18. The AUS announced their schedule on April 4, 2025, with their five teams playing the same ten weeks as the RSEQ. On May 13, 2025, Canada West released their schedule with six teams playing eight games over nine weeks from August 28 to October 25.

== Regular season ==
=== Standings ===
2025 AUS standings
Team	W		L	PF		PA	Pts	Ply
#6 Saint Mary's	7	–	1	278	–	69	14	†
#10 St. FX	5	–	3	187	–	109	10	X
Bishop's	5	–	3	214	–	153	10	X
Acadia	2	–	6	84	–	222	4	X
Mount Allison	1	–	7	75	–	285	2	
† – Conference Champion; Rankings: U Sports Top 10

2025 OUA standings
Team	W		L	PF		PA	Pts	Ply
#1 Laurier	8	–	0	355	–	158	16	†
#3 Western	7	–	1	361	–	246	14	X
#9 Windsor	5	–	3	191	–	155	10	X
#8 Queen's	5	–	3	326	–	173	10	X
McMaster	4	–	4	211	–	234	8	X
Ottawa	4	–	4	204	–	203	8	X
Guelph	3	–	5	236	–	240	6	X
Carleton	3	–	5	215	–	320	6	
Waterloo	2	–	6	137	–	283	4	
York	2	–	6	210	–	327	4	
Toronto	1	–	7	170	–	277	2	
† – Conference Champion; Rankings: U Sports Top 10

2025 RSEQ standings
Team	W		L	PF		PA	Pts	Ply
#2 Laval	7	–	1	236	–	110	14	†
#5 Montréal	6	–	2	280	–	128	12	X
Concordia	3	–	5	136	–	243	6	X
McGill	2	–	6	197	–	250	4	X
Sherbrooke	2	–	6	122	–	240	4	
† – Conference Champion; Rankings: U Sports Top 10

2025 Canada West standings
Team	W		L	PF		PA	Pts	Ply
#4 Saskatchewan	7	–	1	253	–	143	14	†
#7 Regina	6	–	2	246	–	172	12	X
Manitoba	4	–	4	166	–	186	8	X
British Columbia	3	–	5	168	–	245	6	X
Calgary	3	–	5	195	–	224	6	
Alberta	1	–	7	180	–	238	2	
† – Conference Champion; Rankings: U Sports Top 10

== Post-season awards ==
=== Award-winners ===
	Quebec	Ontario	Atlantic	Canada West	National
Hec Crighton Trophy	Arnaud Desjardins (Laval)	Ethan Jordan (Wilfrid Laurier)	Justin Quirion (Bishop's)	Daniel Wiebe (Saskatchewan)	Ethan Jordan (Wilfrid Laurier)
Presidents' Trophy	Justin Cloutier (Laval)	Jessie Wilkins (Wilfrid Laurier)	Owen Watrych (St. Francis Xavier)	Seth Hundeby (Saskatchewan)	Seth Hundeby (Saskatchewan)
J. P. Metras Trophy	Alassane Diouf (Montreal)	Erik Andersen (Western)	Cailob Allaby (Saint Mary's)	Charlie Parks (Saskatchewan)	Erik Andersen (Western)
Peter Gorman Trophy	Pepe Gonzalez (Montreal)	Jackson MacKay (Western)	Mathieu Bellavance (Bishop's)	Zion Grant (Calgary)	Pepe Gonzalez (Montreal)
Russ Jackson Award	Isaac Pepin (Concordia)	Luigi Zagaria (Carleton)	Cameron Brown (Saint Mary's)	Chevy Thomas (Alberta)	Chevy Thomas (Alberta)
Frank Tindall Trophy	Glen Constantin (Laval)	Michael Faulds (Wilfrid Laurier)	Steve Sumarah (Saint Mary's)	Scott Flory (Saskatchewan)	Michael Faulds (Wilfrid Laurier)
Gino Fracas Award	Denis Boisclair (Montreal)	Rob McMurren (Waterloo)	Bryce Fisher (St. Francis Xavier)	Dwayne Masson (Regina)	Dwayne Masson (Regina)

=== All-Canadian Team ===
Offence
	First Team	Second Team
Quarterback	Cal Wither (Laurier)	Arnaud Desjardins (Laval)
Running Back	Jerry Momo (McGill); Marshall Erichsen (Regina)	Ethan Dolby (Western); Jared Chisari (Queen's)
Receiver	Olivier Cool (Laval); Ethan Jordan (Laurier); Daniel Wiebe (Saskatchewan); Carter Kettyle (Alberta)	Enrique Jaimes Leclair (Montréal); Chris Joseph (Toronto); Nathan Falconi (Queen's); Nicholas Sirleaf (Regina)
Centre	Domenico Piazza (McGill)	Kodi Blackshaw (Laurier)
Guard	Alassane Diouf (Montréal); Matt Stokman (Manitoba)	Simon Roy (Laval); Josh Rietveld (Laurier)
Tackle	Erik Andersen (Western); Caleb Cunningham (UBC)	Jean-Darius Nendou (Montréal); Niklas Henning (Queen's)
Utility	Émeric Boutin (Laval)	Evan Smith (Calgary)

Defence
	First Team	Second Team
Defensive Tackle	Yoann Miangué (Laval); Max von Muehldorfer (Western)	Braxton Johnson (Windsor); Reece McCormick (Saskatchewan)
Defensive End	Gabriel Maisonneuve (Montréal); Charlie Parks (Saskatchewan)	Jacob Jinchereau (Laval); Ahmad Taylor (Windsor)
Linebacker	Justin Cloutier (Laval); Benjamin Perron (Sherbrooke); Seth Hundeby (Saskatchewan)	Jessie Wilkins-Flaricee (Laurier); Brandon Wong (Regina); Owen Watrych (St. FX)
Free Safety	Ryan Butler (Saint Mary's)	Carson Sombach (Regina)
Defensive Halfback	Mendel Joseph (Concordia); Jahnai Copeland-Lewis (McGill)	Johari Hastings (Laurier); Alex MacDonald (Bishop's)
Cornerback	Jordan Lessard (Laval); Maliek Cote (Laurier)	Max Polischuk (Regina); Istvan Assibo-Dadzie (Windsor)

Special Teams
	First Team	Second Team
Kicker	Brady Lidster (Windsor)	Ty Gorniak (Regina)
Punter	Michael Horvat (McMaster)	Joel Pipke (Calgary)
Returner	Tayshaun Jackson (Laurier)	Chandler Zinck-Marier (Saint Mary's)
Rush/Cover	Connor Jones (Calgary)	William Tremblay (Laval)

== Post-season ==
The Vanier Cup is played between the champions of the Mitchell Bowl and the Uteck Bowl, the national semi-final games. In 2025, according to the rotating schedule, the Canada West Hardy Trophy championship team visited the winners of the Yates Cup Ontario championship for the Mitchell Bowl. The Québec conference's Jacques Dussault Cup championship team visited the Atlantic conference Loney Bowl championship team for the Uteck Bowl. These games were played on November 15, 2025, while the Vanier Cup is scheduled to be played on November 22, 2025.

=== Conference Championships ===
==== Atlantic University Sport ====
November 1 Semi-finals
1	St. Mary's	37
4	Acadia	0
2	St. Francis Xavier	26
3	Bishops	24

November 8; 34th Loney Bowl
1	St. Mary's	46
2	St. Francis Xavier	11

==== Canada West ====
November 1 Semi-finals
1	Saskatchewan	26
4	UBC	7
2	Regina	32
3	Manitoba	29

November 8; 88th Hardy Trophy
1	Saskatchewan	25
2	Regina	24

==== Ontario University Athletics ====
October 25; Quarter-finals
2	Western	17
7	Guelph	18
3	Windsor	31
6	Ottawa	24
4	Queen's	46
5	McMaster	10

November 1 Semi-finals
1	Laurier	37
7	Guelph	30
3	Windsor	25
4	Queen's	36

November 8; 117th Yates Cup
1	Laurier	27
4	Queen's	30

==== Réseau du Sport Étudiant du Québec ====
November 1 Semi-finals
1	Laval	47
4	McGill	25
2	Montreal	51
3	Concordia	2

November 8; 1st Jacques Dussault Cup
1	Laval	29
2	Montreal	31

=== National Championship ===
November 15th Semi-finals
23rd Mitchell Bowl – Saskatoon, SK
Queen's	11
Saskatchewan	22
22nd Uteck Bowl – Halifax, NS
Montreal	49
Saint Mary's	19

November 22nd Final
60th Vanier Cup – Regina, SK
Saskatchewan	16
Montreal	30
