= Chomedey Polyvalent High School =

School in Laval, Quebec, Canada

Coordinates: 45°33′9″N 73°44′31″W

Chomedey High
- Chomedey Polyvalent High School

Information
- Established: 1962
- School board: PSBGSM / Larenval / Sir Wilfrid Laurier
- School district: Laval, Quebec
- Teams: Chomedey Chiefs

Chomedey Polyvalent High School (CPHS) (French: l'École secondaire Chomedey Polyvalent) was a junior and senior high school in Laval. originally it was part of the North Island Regional School Board and subsequently it was a part of the Laurenval and then later Sir Wilfrid Laurier School Board. It was located at 3200 Blvd du Souvenir in Laval. Its current incarnation is Laval Senior Academy.

== History ==
The school was initially founded by the newly created Protestant School board of Greater St Martin in 1962 and was named Chomedey Protestant High school. In 1964 during the time of the creation of the city of Laval and the establishment of regional school boards in Quebec, the school was renamed Chomedey Polyvalent High school and merged in students from the other local high school, in the then St.Martin Parish as well as students from the newly formed Laurenvale school board in the Two Mountains area

In February in 1981 an explosion occurred in a washroom at the school, smoke filled the adjacent hallways. Students were quickly evacuated from the building and classes were cancelled for the remainder of the day. Investigators concluded that the explosion was caused by a homemade bomb and attributed motivation as a student prank. The damage was considered minimal.

At the start of the 1983 school year, the senior classes of Western Laval High School (WLHS) and Chomedey Polyvalent High School (At the time part of the Laurenval Schoolboard) were amalgamated into Chomedey Polyvalent High School, thus creating WHLS as a Junior High School and CPHS as its senior counterpart. At the end of the decade, due to the influx of non-Catholic students who didn't qualify for English education in Quebec, the Junior/Senior split of the schools was reversed and WLHS became an English high school and CPHS a French instruction secondary school, then known as "École secondaire Chomedey"

In 1994, Quebec's Bill 107 was passed, which would dissolve confessional school boards and create linguistic ones. The Protestant and Catholic school boards would convert in the next four years into secular linguistic (French and English) school boards. In 1998 the Laurenval school board had to complete the transition to an English school board, while the Catholic school board was able to obtain an extension until 2003, resulting in a student population dynamic which required that one English secondary school in Laval would have to be given up to the Catholic school board. The building containing Western Laval High School was given to the Catholic school board, and the staff and all WLHS students were moved to the Chomedey High building, and it was then renamed to "Western Laval High School"

CPHS was home to the Chiefs football team until the early '80s, the football program was re-instated in 2003 after the founding of Laval Liberty High School with the introduction of the Panthers and Junior High Vipers team. The new football program, as well as several others, were implemented as an attempt to curb a high dropout rate among students.

== Alumni ==
- Canadian football player Ray Baillie and Canadian history teacher at CPHS, as well as the coach of the Chiefs at CPHS for several decades
- Geoff Baker – award-winning Canadian-born journalist currently an NHL writer and columnist
- Alouettes star and Canadian football player Gerry Dattilio is the namesake of the "Parc Gerry Dattilio Sports Field" attached to the school.
- Rodney Kellman known as Dru Onyx – professional wrestler, and former rap artist
- Franklin Kiermyer – jazz drummer, composer and band leader
- Nicolas Macrozonaris – four-time 100 meter and 200 meter champion
- William Rosenberg - the first non-US lawyer to serve as Chair of the American Bar Association (ABA) Business Law Section, which is the largest voluntary association of lawyers in the world.
- Howard Stupp (born 1955), Olympic wrestler
- Joel Yanofsky, novelist and literary columnist
- Anthony Griffin – an unarmed black teen who was shot dead by a police officer on Nov. 11, 1987
