= Ivor Wynne =

Canadian educator and university administrator (1918–1970)

- Born: Ifor Wynne; November 2, 1918; Duffryn, Wales, United Kingdom
- Died: November 1, 1970 (aged 51); Hamilton, Ontario, Canada
- Education: Syracuse University
- Occupations: Teacher, university administrator
- Known for: McMaster University athletic director

Ivor Wynne (born Ifor Wynne; November 2, 1918 – November 1, 1970) was a Canadian educator and university administrator who was the director of athletics at McMaster University from 1948 to 1965. Succeeding Arthur Burridge, Wynne led efforts to construct the university athletic complex, and establish the School of Physical Education. He also coached McMaster's basketball team, became president of the Canadian Intercollegiate Athletic Union, and was the university's first dean of students in 1965.

Wynne was a colour commentator on CHCH-TV for Hamilton Tiger-Cats and collegiate games for 16 seasons, and chairman of the Hamilton Parks Board. He advocated for recreational facilities and lobbied Hamilton City Council for parks funding. After his death at age 51, Ivor Wynne Stadium was named to honour him, and he was inducted into the builder category of the McMaster Marauders Hall of Fame.

== Early life and education ==
Born Ifor Wynne on November 2, 1918, in Duffryn, Wales, his family immigrated to Hamilton, Ontario, in 1924. (Note: Wynne was born in Wales on November 2, 1918.; Ifor Wynne was born in Wales.; Wynne's 52nd birthday was reported to be November 2, 1970, indicating he was born in 1918.; Wynne was born in the Welsh town of Duffryn.; Wynne's family immigrated to Hamilton, Ontario, in 1924.; Ivor Wynne was born in Wales on November 2, 1918, Wynne immigrated to Canada with his family at the age of six in 1924.; Wynne was born in Wales, and came to Canada in 1924. His 52nd birthday was November 2, 1970.) Initially living in Caledonia, Ontario, his family moved to downtown Hamilton in 1928. He attended Stinson Street Public School then Hamilton Central Collegiate. He played football on his high school teams, and on lacrosse and baseball teams in Hamilton. At McMaster University, he played football, basketball, and ice hockey. In football, he played the quarterback position despite his small stature.

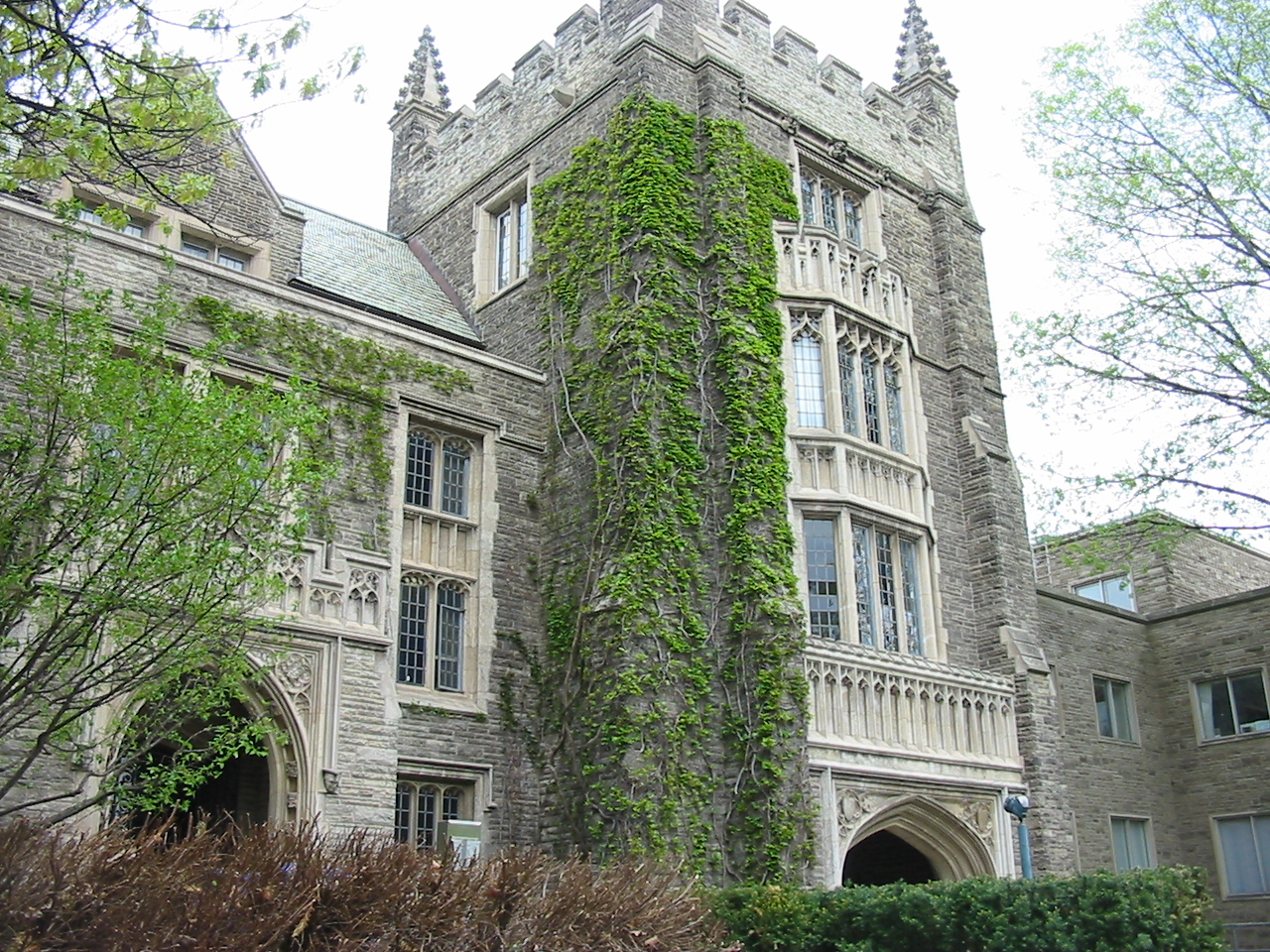
McMaster University administration building

As a student, Wynne received the Hamilton Olympic Club scholarship. He also spent two seasons as a member of the Vancouver Clover Leafs basketball team and took part in their tour of the Philippines. He earned a bachelor's degree in Political Economy from McMaster in 1940, then worked two years as a teacher and coach at Bloor Collegiate Institute. Enlisting in the Canadian Army in 1942, he became a Lieutenant and artillery instructor during World War II. In 1946, he joined the faculty of Parkdale Collegiate Institute.

== University career ==
In the late 1940s, Wynne was an assistant to the physical education department and the director of intramural athletics at the Ontario College of Education, followed by two years at University of British Columbia as the assistant director of physical education and the director of intramural athletics.

In 1948, Arthur Burridge resigned as McMaster's director of physical education and basketball coach and recommended Wynne as his successor. Wynne assumed the position on July 1 that year, then completed his Master of Education from Syracuse University in 1949.

At McMaster, Wynne led efforts to construct the university athletic complex, and establish the School of Physical Education. He also coached McMaster's basketball team, and became the university's first dean of students in 1965. He was succeeded as athletic director by his assistant of 25 years, Les Prince.

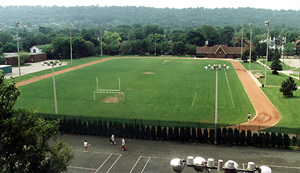
McMaster's football team played at the Hamilton Amateur Athletic Association Grounds when Wynne became the director of physical education.

Wynne was dedicated to building up the school's football program. In 1949, he moved the team from the Hamilton Amateur Athletic Association Grounds to the larger and more modern Civic Stadium. In 1952, he convinced the Canadian Intercollegiate Athletic Union (CIAU) to admit McMaster into senior football competition along with McGill, Queen's, Toronto, and Western. After being denied entry into the Senior Intercollegiate Football League, McMaster moved to a smaller on-campus stadium. In 1965, Wynne recruited Jack Kennedy to McMaster and two years later, he led the football team to an 11–0 regular season and its first appearance in the Vanier Cup national championship game.

From 1965 to 1967, Wynne was the CIAU president. He was also the Ontario-Quebec Athletic Association representative to the CIAU board of governors, and chairman of CIAU College Bowl selection committee. In 1966, he chaired a committee studying whether to allow athletic scholarships in the CIAU, for discussion at the 1967 general meeting. The CIAU decided that scholarships should not be given out solely based on athletic merits, upholding that scholarships were based on academic merits. The CIAU also felt that students who accepted National Collegiate Athletic Association scholarships in the United States, would not have qualified for academic standards at Canadian universities. In 1968, Wynne was chaired the CIAU management committee, and helped propose a Prairie Bowl in Western Canada as part of a national playdown for the College Bowl.

== Community involvement ==
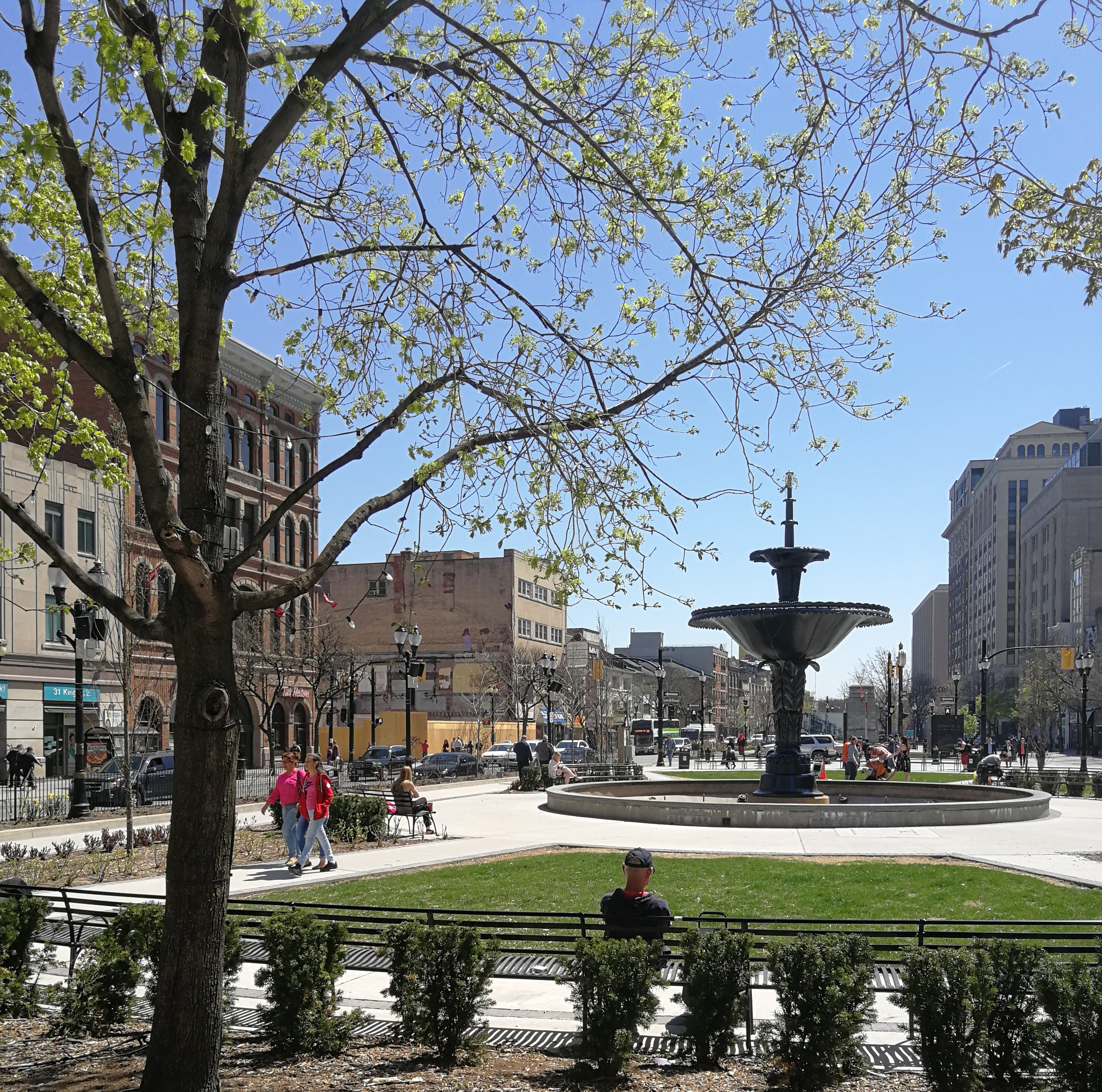
Wynne oversaw renovations at Gore Park.

For 16 seasons, Wynne was a colour commentator on CHCH-TV from 1954 to 1970, broadcasting Hamilton Tiger-Cats and collegiate games with Norm Marshall. Wynne was appointed chairman of the Hamilton Parks Board in 1966, and advised the city on the first large-scale renovations made to Civic Stadium, completed in 1970. He was also the Government of Canada sports school awards committee chairman, and sat on the Dundurn Castle management committee. He oversaw renovations at Gore Park, advocated recreational facilities in the city, and presented annual reports to Hamilton City Council for parks funding.

== Personal life and legacy ==
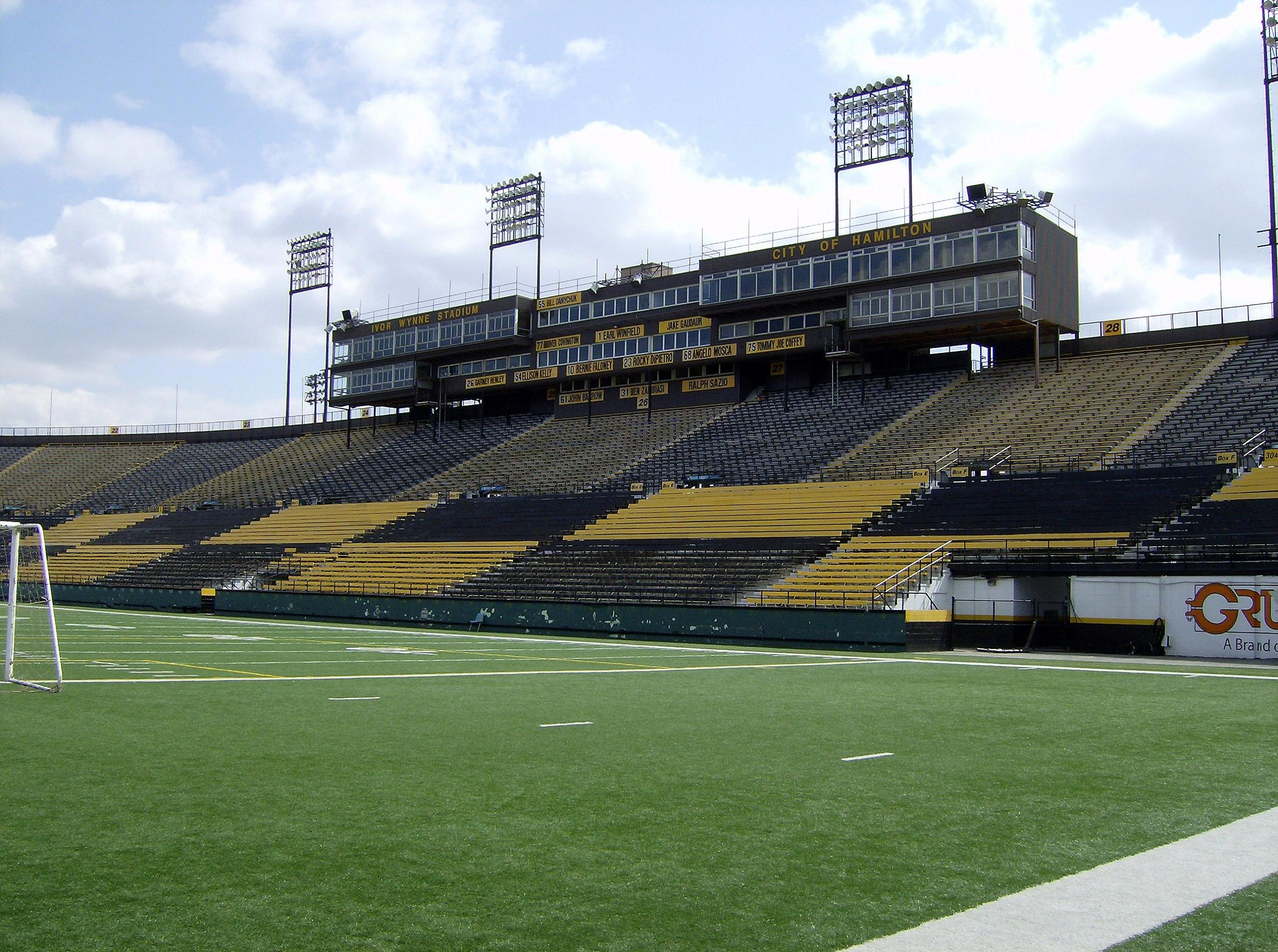
Ivor Wynne Stadium in 2007

In 1970, Wynne contracted diabetes, which led to a rare blood disease. He died at Henderson General Hospital in Hamilton on November 1, 1970. He had been married to Frances Girvan, and had two sons.

In November 1970, the Ivor Wynne Memorial Fund was established for scholarships at McMaster University. The university's physical education centre was posthumously renamed for him, he was inducted into the builder category of the McMaster Marauders Hall of Fame in 1984, and the university's award for the male athlete of the year was named the Ivor Wynne Award.

Locally, he was known as "Ivor the driver" for his relentless efforts to promote sports. In December 1970, the Hamilton Parks Board renamed Civic Stadium to honour him. Ivor Wynne Stadium and Percival Molson Memorial Stadium became the only two Canadian Football League stadiums named for people known for amateur sport. The 2014 lease for the Hamilton Tiger-Cats at Tim Hortons Field stipulated that the press box would be named the "Ivor Wynne Press Centre".
