= McGill Redbirds football =

University Canadian football team

McGill Redbirds
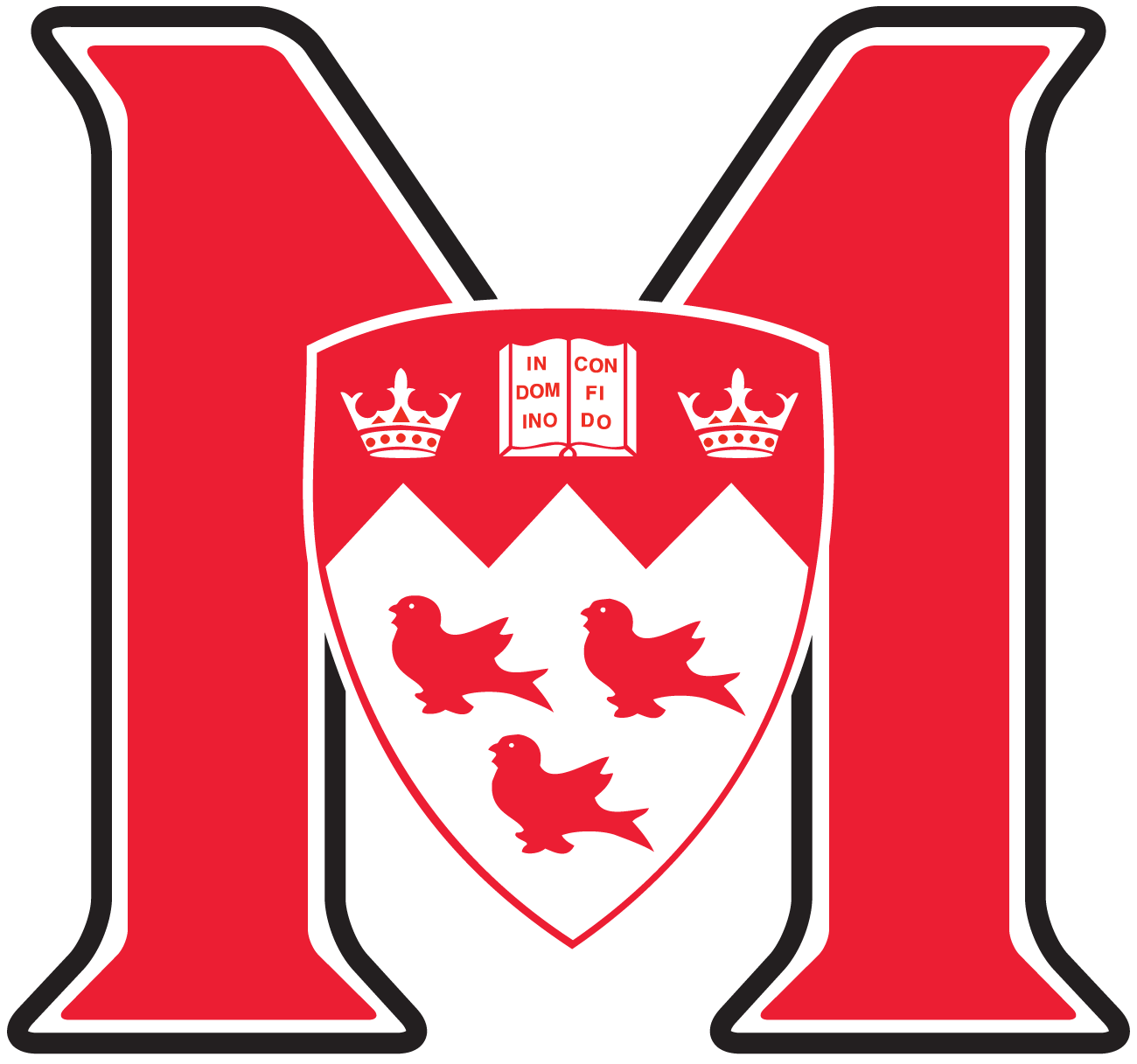
- McGill Redbirds logo
- First season: 1874
- Athletic director: Drew Love
- Head coach: Alex Surprenant; 3rd year, 10–14 (.417)
- Home stadium: Percival Molson Memorial Stadium
- Year built: 1914
- Stadium capacity: 20,025
- Stadium surface: FieldTurf
- Location: Montreal, Quebec
- League: U Sports
- Conference: RSEQ (2010 – present)
- Past associations: CRFU (1898–1914, 1919–1939, 1946–1970); QUAA (1971–1973); OQIFC (1974–2000); QSSF (2001–2009)
- All-time record: –
- Postseason record: –

Titles
- Vanier Cups: 1; 1987
- Mitchell Bowls: 3; 1958, 1960, 1973
- Atlantic Bowls: 2; 1969, 1987
- Yates Cups: 10; 1902, 1906, 1912, 1913, 1919, 1928, 1938, 1960, 1962, 1969
- Dunsmore Cups: 3; 1987, 2001, 2002
- Hec Crighton winners: 1 Dave Fleiszer

Current uniform
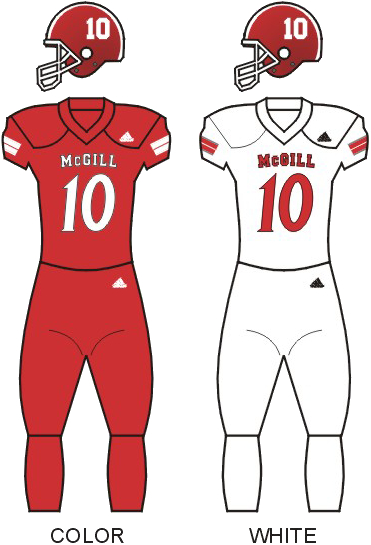
- Colours: Red, White, and Black
- Outfitter: Adidas
- Rivals: Montreal Carabins; Concordia Stingers
- Website: McGill Football

The McGill Redbirds football team represents McGill University in Canadian football in U Sports and is based in Montreal, Quebec. The program is one of the oldest in all of Canada, having begun organized competition in 1874. The team won its first collegiate championship in 1902 and also won in 1912, 1913, 1919, 1928, 1938 and 1960 prior to the inauguration of the Vanier Cup in 1965. McGill appeared in the Vanier Cup final in 1969, 1973 and 1987, with the Redmen finally winning the title in the 1987 game. McGill plays out of Percival Molson Memorial Stadium, where the Canadian Football League's Montreal Alouettes also play.

The program had long used the Redmen moniker until the name was dropped in May 2019 after nearly 80% of students voted to change the name in a 2018 referendum held by McGill's student union. The team adopted the Redbirds name on November 17, 2020.

== History ==
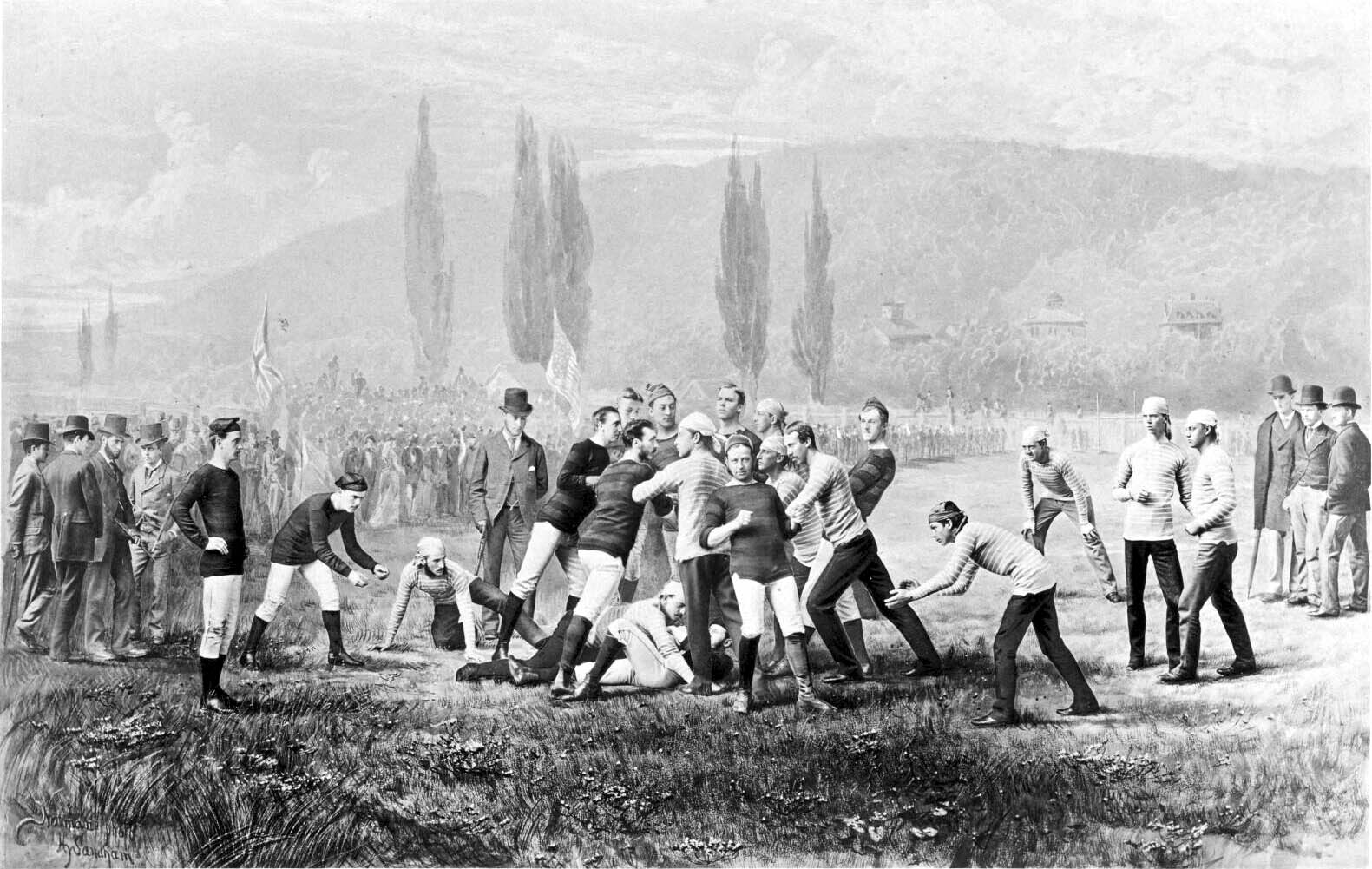
The McGill v. Harvard game played in 1874

In 1874, McGill and Harvard met in the first North American style football game.

Old "Football Fightum" had been resurrected at Harvard in 1872, when Harvard resumed playing football. Harvard, however, had adopted a version of football which allowed carrying, albeit only when the player carrying the ball was being pursued. As a result of this, Harvard refused to attend the rules conference organized by the other schools and continued to play under its own code. While Harvard's voluntary absence from the meeting made it hard for them to schedule games against other American universities, it agreed to a challenge to play McGill University in a two-game series. Inasmuch as rugby football had been transplanted to Canada from England, the McGill team played under a set of rules which allowed a player to pick up the ball and run with it whenever he wished. Another rule, unique to McGill, was to count tries (the act of grounding the football past the opposing team's goal line; there was no end zone during this time), as well as goals, in the scoring. In the Rugby rules of the time, a touchdown only provided the chance to kick a free goal from the field. If the kick was missed, the touchdown did not count.

The McGill team travelled to Cambridge to meet Harvard. On May 14, 1874, the first game, played under Harvard's rules, was won by Harvard with a score of 3–0. The next day, the two teams played under "McGill" rugby rules to a scoreless tie. The games featured a round ball instead of a rugby-style oblong ball. This series of games represents an important milestone in the development of the modern game of American football. In October 1874, the Harvard team once again travelled to Montreal to play McGill in rugby, where they won by three tries.

From 1898, McGill played in the Canadian Intercollegiate Rugby Football Union, and won their first championship, the Yates Cup in 1902. In 1912, Frank Shaughnessy was recruited as the first professional head coach. His teams won the Yates Cup during his first two seasons. In 1919, the team went undefeated and did not concede a touchdown, and in 1928. The 1919 team was inducted into McGill's Hall of Fame in 2010.

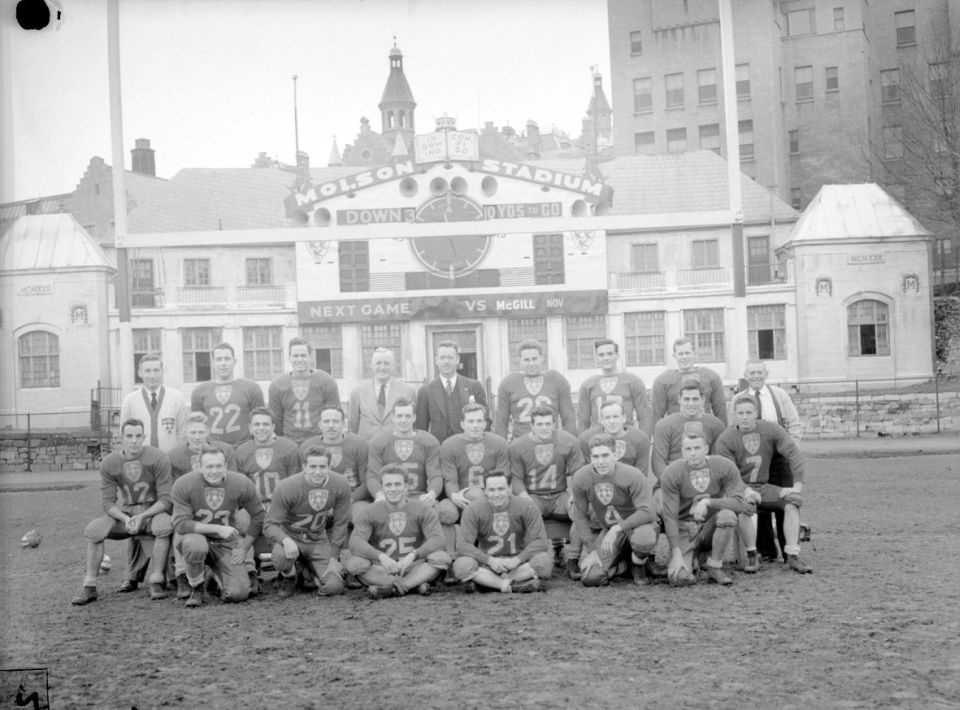
McGill team of 1946

McGill next won a championship in 1938. The team tied for the regular season 8–1 with Western after losing their final regular-season game to Western. The teams played off for the championship, won 9–0 by McGill, with all the scoring from kicker Herb Westman, who kicked a school record nine punt singles. The team would not win another title until 1960, when they won the Yates Cup, against Queen's University of Kingston, then defeated the Canada West champion Alberta Golden Bears in a challenge match for an unofficial national championship (Churchill Bowl).

In 1971, McGill joined a newly formed Quebec-only conference known as the Quebec University Athletic Association. In 1974, the three remaining Quebec teams merged with three Ontario teams in the Ontario-Quebec Intercollegiate Football Conference.

McGill won the ODIFC's Dunsmore Cup again for the first time 1987, along with the Montreal Shrine Bowl, Shaughnessy Cup, Robert Stanfield trophy (Atlantic Bowl champions) and the Vanier Cup (CIAU national champions). The 1987 team featured Michael Soles at running back, who went on to a lengthy playing career in the Canadian Football League. That team was coached by Charlie Baillie who took over in 1972 and served as head coach until 2000. Baillie surpassed the legendary Frank Shaughnessy's school record for wins and went on to become McGill's winningest coach. His overall record was 119–111–2.

Since the retirement of long-time head coach Charlie Baillie in 2000, the team has only won two league championships (2001, 2002). In October 2005, the McGill administration cancelled the last three games of football team's season after confirmed reports of hazing involving sexual abuse. After their 2005 suspension, the team struggled with three losing seasons, including two winless seasons in 2007 and 2008. The program showed signs of hope as the team won three games in 2009, but soon sank back down to futility with consecutive winless campaigns in 2010 and 2011. In 2012, the team qualified for the playoffs for the first time since 2006, but lost to perennial powerhouse Laval. The team returned to the playoffs in 2016, 2018 and 2019, but were defeated each time in blowout losses to the conference's other powerhouse, the Montreal Carabins. After three straight seasons of 1–7 records and fifth place finishes, Hillaire was relieved of head coaching duties on December 1, 2023. On February 9, 2024, Alex Surprenant was named the 22nd head coach in program history.

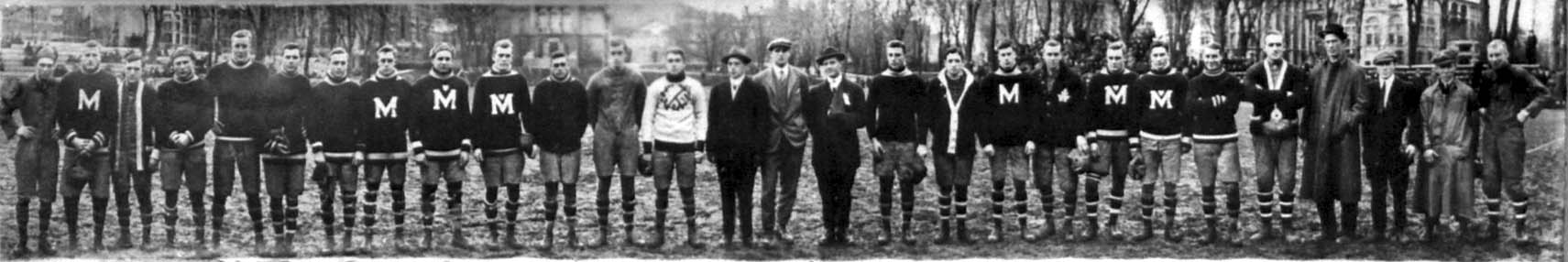
McGill team of 1912

== Recent results ==
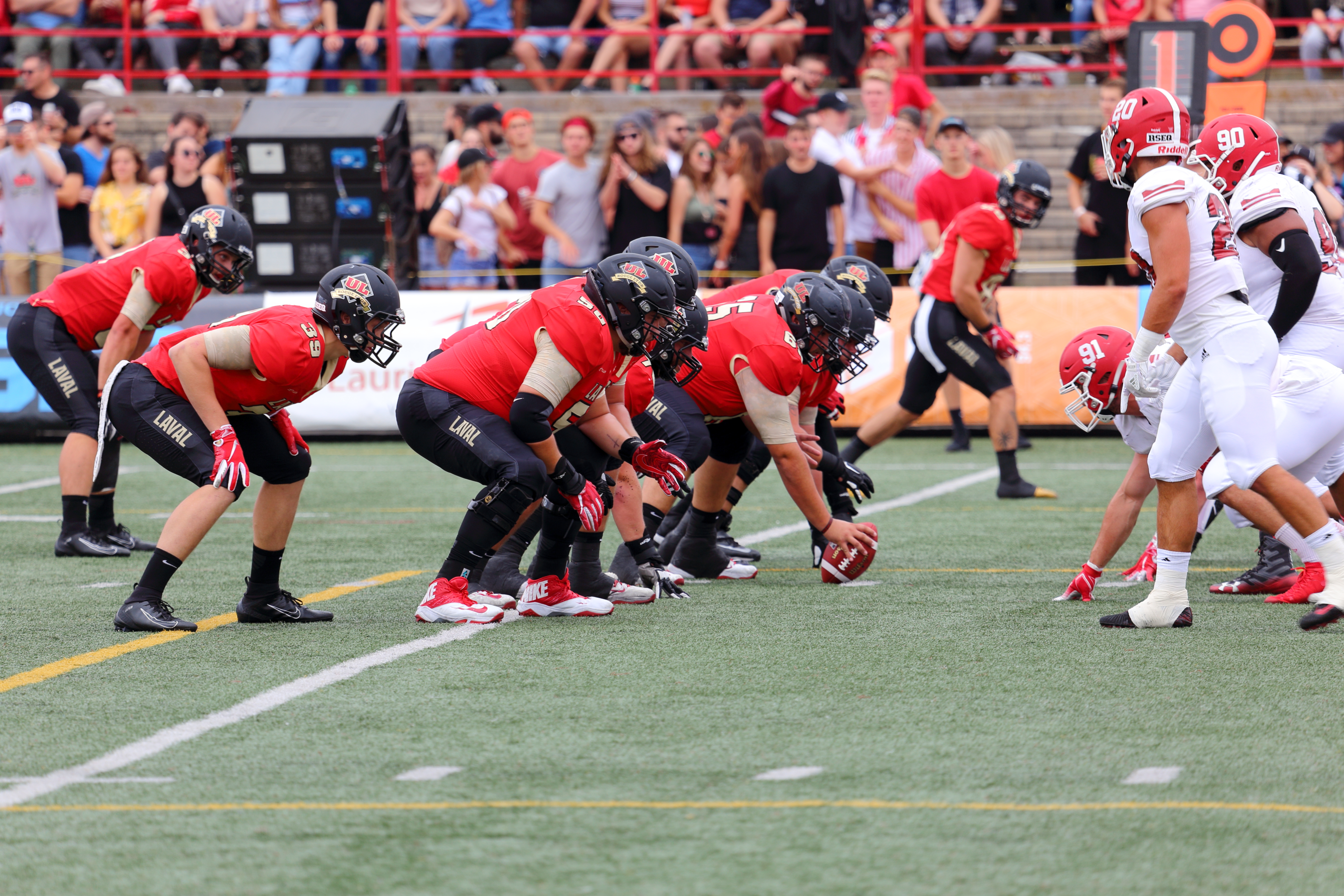
McGill v Rouge in 2019

Season	P	W	L	OTL	PCT	PF	PA	Standing	Playoffs
2001	8	5	3	-	0.625	161	166	2nd in QUFL	Defeated Concordia Stingers in semi-final 11–8; Lost to Laval Rouge et Or in Dunsmore Cup 42–14^{[A]}
2002	8	7	1	-	0.875	299	93	1st in QUFL	Defeated Bishop's Gaiters in semi-final 44–0; Defeated Concordia Stingers in Dunsmore Cup 10–6; Lost to Saskatchewan Huskies in Mitchell Bowl 22–0
2003	8	3	5	-	0.375	171	205	4th in QUFL	Lost to Laval Rouge et Or in semi-final 47–7
2004	8	4	4	-	0.500	162	158	4th in QUFL	Lost to Montreal Carabins in semi-final 38–18
2005	8	1	7	-	0.125	120	233	6th in QUFL	Out of playoffs
2006	8	4	4	-	0.500	157	168	4th in QUFL	Lost to Laval Rouge et Or in semi-final 52–0
2007	8	0	8	-	0.000	144	289	6th in QUFL	Out of playoffs
2008	8	0	8	-	0.000	130	413	6th in QUFL	Out of playoffs
2009	8	3	5	-	0.375	181	267	5th in QUFL	Out of playoffs
2010	9	0	9	-	0.000	102	330	6th in QUFL	Out of playoffs
2011	9	0	9	-	0.000	139	287	6th in RSEQ	Out of playoffs
2012	9	3	6	-	0.333	157	294	4th in RSEQ	Lost to Laval Rouge et Or in semi-final 46–9
2013	8	3	5	-	0.375	220	263	5th in RSEQ	Out of playoffs
2014	8	0	8	-	0.000	103	342	6th in RSEQ	Out of playoffs
2015	8	3	5	-	0.375	192	249	5th in RSEQ	Out of playoffs
2016	8	4	4	-	0.500	156	173	4th in RSEQ	Lost to Montreal Carabins in semi-final 42–0
2017	8	1	7	-	0.125	105	282	5th in RSEQ	Out of playoffs
2018	8	2	6	-	0.250	109	233	3rd in RSEQ	Lost to Montreal Carabins in semi-final 48–2
2019	8	3	5	-	0.375	124	191	3rd in RSEQ	Lost to Montreal Carabins in semi-final 31–0
2020	Season cancelled due to COVID-19 pandemic								
2021	8	1	7	-	0.125	99	223	5th in RSEQ	Out of playoffs
2022	8	1	7	-	0.125	167	262	5th in RSEQ	Out of playoffs
2023	8	1	7	-	0.125	147	310	5th in RSEQ	Out of playoffs
2024	8	3	5	-	0.375	168	252	3rd in RSEQ	Lost to Montreal Carabins in semi-final 42–3
2025	8	2	6	-	0.250	197	250	4th in RSEQ	Lost to Laval Rouge et Or in semi-final 47-25
2026	8	5	3	-	0.625	243	175	3rd in RSEQ	Lost to Montreal Carabins in semi-final 28-21

A. McGill was later awarded the Cup by forfeit after it was discovered that Laval had used ineligible players

== National postseason results ==
Vanier Cup Era (1965–current)
Year	Game	Opponent	Result
1969	Atlantic Bowl; Vanier Cup	UNB; Manitoba	W 20–6; L 15–24
1973	Churchill Bowl; Vanier Cup	Manitoba; Saint Mary's	W 16–0; L 6–14
1987	Atlantic Bowl; Vanier Cup	Saint Mary's; UBC	W 30–29; W 47–11
2002	Mitchell Bowl	Saskatchewan	L 0–22

McGill is 3–1 in national semi-final games and 1–2 in the Vanier Cup.

== Head coaches ==
Name	Tenure	Notes
A.M. Hamilton	1908	
Bill Steedman	1911	
Frank Shaughnessy	1912–27, 1932–34	First professional coach in Canadian college history; Yates Cup in 1912, 1913 and 1919.
Lorne Montgomery	1928–29	Yates Cup in 1928. In 1928 and 1929, McGill was coached by an honorary coach (Montgomery), a member of the athletic staff (Burridge), and two graduate assists (Flanagan and Hall)
Flin Flanagan	1928	Yates Cup in 1928
Tommy Hall	1928–29	Yates Cup in 1928
Arthur Burridge	1928–29	Yates Cup in 1928
D. Stuart Forbes	1930–31	
Joe O'Brien	1935	
Doug Kerr	1936–46	Yates Cup in 1938
Vic Obeck	1947–53	
Larry Sullivan	1954–57	
Bruce Coulter	1958–61	Yates Cup, national championship in 1960
Bill Bewley	1962–64	Yates Cup in 1962
Tom Mooney	1965–70	Yates Cup in 1969
John Roberts	1971	
Charlie Baillie	1972–2000	National championship (Vanier Cup in 1987)
Chuck McMann	2001–2006	
Sonny Wolfe	2007–11	
Clint Uttley	2011–2014	Took over as interim for final three games of 2011 season; named head coach after season but resigned on September 30, 2014.
Ronald Hilaire	2015–2023	Appointed head coach Feb 17, 2015. Finished 2014 season as interim co-head coach.
Alex Surprenant	2024–present	

Source: McGill.

== National award winners ==
- Hec Crighton Trophy: Dave Fleiszer (1969)
- J. P. Metras Trophy: Randy Chevrier (2000), Laurent Duvernay-Tardif (2013), Andrew Seinet-Spaulding (2019)
- Peter Gorman Trophy: Michael Soles (1986), Shaquille Johnson (2012), Eloa Latendresse-Regimbald (2022)
- Russ Jackson Award: J.P. Veri (1990, 1991), Steve Papp (1994), Jean-Philippe Darche (1998)
- Frank Tindall Trophy: Chuck McMann (2002)

== Notable former players ==
=== CFL ===
- Joshua Archibald – Montreal Alouettes, BC Lions
- Ben Labrosse – Calgary Stampeders
- Eloa Latendresse-Regimbald – Edmonton Elks
- Domenico Piazza – Edmonton Elks, Toronto Argonauts
- Maxime Rouyer – BC Lions, Panthers Wrocław, Edmonton Elks

=== ELF ===
- Valentin Gnahoua – Hamilton Tiger-Cats, Saskatchewan Roughriders, Paris Musketeers

=== Former professional players ===
- Jesse Briggs – Winnipeg Blue Bombers
- Jean-Nicolas Carrière – Toronto Argonauts
- Randy Chevrier – Edmonton Eskimos, Calgary Stampeders
- Samir Chahine - Edmonton Eskimos, Toronto Argonauts, Hamilton Tiger Cats, Calgary Stampeders, Ottawa Renegades
- Ryan Coughlin – Montreal Alouettes
- J. P. Darche – Toronto Argonauts, Seattle Seahawks, Kansas City Chiefs
- Laurent Duvernay-Tardif – Kansas City Chiefs, New York Jets
- Mike Edem – Saskatchewan Roughriders, BC Lions, Hamilton Tiger-Cats, Montreal Alouettes
- Erik Galas – Montreal Alouettes
- Greg Hetherington – Calgary Stampeders, BC Lions
- Shaq Johnson – Ottawa Redblacks, BC Lions
- John Macdonald – Hamilton Tiger-Cats
- Christian Masotti – Edmonton Eskimos
- Jim Miller – Montreal Alouettes
- Joe Poirier – Ottawa Rough Riders
- Hector Pothier – Edmonton Eskimos
- Silver Quilty – Ottawa Rough Riders
- Val St. Germain – Hamilton Tiger-Cats, Edmonton Eskimos, Ottawa Renegades, Winnipeg Blue Bombers, Saskatchewan Roughriders
- Andrew Seinet-Spaulding – Calgary Stampeders
- Michael Soles – Edmonton Eskimos, Montreal Alouettes
- George Springate – Montreal Alouettes
- Gene Robillard – BC Lions

== See also ==
- U Sports
