= LLHS =

LLHS may refer to:

- Hatzor Airbase, an Israeli Air Force military air base
- Laval Liberty High School, Laval, Quebec, Canada
- Las Lomas High School, Walnut Creek, California, United States
- Los Lunas High School, Los Lunas, New Mexico, United States
