= 23rd Vanier Cup =

1987 Canadian university football championship

UBC Thunderbirds	McGill Redmen
(6–2)
11	47
Head coach: Frank Smith	Head coach: Charlie Baillie
	1	2	3	4	Total
UBC Thunderbirds	0	0	0	11	11
McGill Redmen	0	0	0	47	47
- Date: November 21, 1987
- Stadium: Varsity Stadium
- Location: Toronto
- Ted Morris Memorial Trophy: Michael Soles, McGill
- Attendance: 14,326

The 23rd Vanier Cup was played on November 21, 1987, at Varsity Stadium in Toronto, Ontario, and decided the CIAU football champion for the 1987 season. The McGill Redmen won their first ever championship by defeating the defending champion UBC Thunderbirds by a score of 47–11.
