= Western Laval High School =

Former school in Laval, Quebec, Canada

Coordinates: 45.5526°N 73.7421°W

Western Laval High School Western Laval
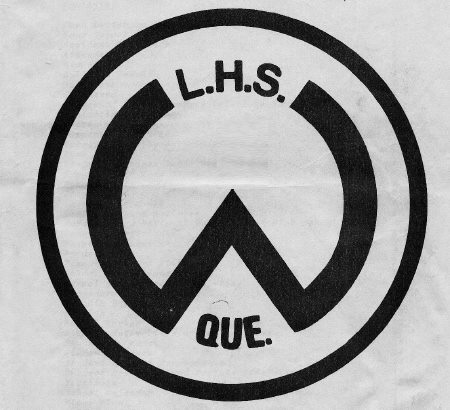

Information
- Established: 1972
- Closed: 2005
- School board: PSBGSM / Larenval / Sir Wilfrid Laurier
- School district: Laval, Quebec

Western Laval High School was a junior and senior high school in Laval, Quebec, Canada, that was part of the Sir Wilfrid Laurier School Board. It existed for 33 years before its closure in 2005.

== History ==
Western Laval High School opened in 1972, at 5075 Souvenir Road, in the Chomedey district of Laval. During its first decade it operated as an age combined high school, mixing students from grade 7 through 11.

In 1983, its senior classes were moved and amalgamated into Chomedey Polyvalent High School (at the time part of the Laurenval School Board), located over two miles away. At this point the school became exclusively a junior high school, with CPHS as its senior counterpart. By the end of the decade, this was reversed and the Anglophone-instructed student seniors from Chomedey Polyvalent were transferred to Western Laval, making it a combined junior/senior high school once again. CPHS was renamed to its registered French alternate name as École secondaire Chomedey and became a French instruction / French Immersion high school under the Laurenval School Board.

In 1998, it moved to its final campus location at the former Chomedey Polyvalent High School (the original Western Laval High School building was taken over by the newly formed Commission Scolaire De Laval (Francophone school board) and became École Marie-Curie and is currently named École d'éducation internationale de Laval.

In 2005 Western Laval High School was renamed and split into two schools. Students voted for the new school names resulting in the lower secondary levels forming a new school called Laval Junior High School and the upper secondary levels forming the new Laval Liberty High School.

=== Post Western Laval High School years ===
Both Laval Junior High and Laval Liberty High were also eventually renamed, when in 2015 Laval Liberty High and Laurier Senior High School (formerly Laval Catholic High School) merged and were made into a new senior high school called Laval Senior Academy. Laval Senior Academy now occupies the former Chomedey Polyvalent High School building, which was founded in 1962, and essentially replaces the defunct schools: Western Laval, Chomedey Polyvalent, Laval Liberty and Laurier Senior (Western Laval's junior high segment, which existed in some form since 1972, had been eliminated).

== Images ==
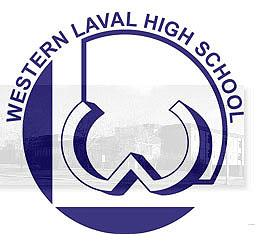
Logo after the move in 1998
