= Chuck McMann =

Canadian football player (1951–2021)

Profile
- Position: Running back

Personal information
- Born: May 11, 1951; Toronto, Ontario, Canada
- Died: July 20, 2021 (aged 70); Qualicum Beach, British Columbia, Canada
- Listed height: 6 ft 0 in (1.83 m)
- Listed weight: 202 lb (92 kg)

Career information
- University: Wilfrid Laurier
- CFL draft: 1976: 3rd round, 24th overall pick

Career history

Playing
- 1976–1981: Montreal Alouettes
- 1982–1985: Montreal Concordes

Coaching
- 1988–1991: Waterloo Warriors (HC)
- 1992–2000: Calgary Stampeders (AC)
- 2001–2006: McGill Redmen (HC)
- 2007: Calgary Stampeders (RC)
- 2008–2021: BC Lions (STC/RBC)

Awards and highlights
- As player: Grey Cup champion (1977); As coach: 3× Grey Cup champion (1992, 1998, 2011); Frank Tindall Trophy (2002)

Charles McMann (May 11, 1951 – July 20, 2021) was a Canadian professional football running back who played 10 seasons in the Canadian Football League (CFL) for the Montreal Alouettes and Montreal Concordes. He went on to serve as special teams coordinator and running backs coach for the BC Lions. He was also the head coach of the Waterloo Warriors and the McGill Redmen of CIS football, as well as being named the CIS Coach of the Year in 2002. He won a Grey Cup championship in 1977 as a player before winning three more championships as a coach.

== Early life ==
McMann was born in Toronto on May 11, 1951. He studied at Wilfrid Laurier University, where he played football for the Golden Hawks from 1973 to 1976. He was subsequently drafted by the Montreal Alouettes in the third round of the 1976 CFL draft.

== Professional career ==
McMann played for the Montreal Alouettes and its successor, the Montreal Concordes, from 1976 to 1985. During this time, the franchise made three appearances in Grey Cup games and won the championship in 1977. He retired at the conclusion of the 1985 season.

== Coaching career ==
After retiring as a player, McMann served as head coach of the Waterloo Warriors from 1988 until 1991. He went on to join the Calgary Stampeders the following year. As part of Wally Buono's coaching staff, McMann won championship rings in 1992 and 1998. His first stint with the franchise came to an end after the 2000 season.

McMann became the head football coach at McGill University in 2001, succeeding Charlie Baillie. The Redmen won the Dunsmore Cup during his first two seasons, and he was conferred the CIS Frank Tindall Trophy in 2002 as Canadian university football's coach of the year. In October 2005, the university administration called off the team's final two games of the season, in response to substantiated reports that most players had engaged in hazing at the start of the academic year. McMann initially suspended one player for an indefinite period and five players for one game. He was dismayed by the decision to cancel the rest of the season. Although he sympathized with the university's "need to make a strong statement", he felt that the players "ha[d] been punished enough". Several former Redmen players demanded that McMann be dismissed. However, the university's interim athletic director said that firing McMann was never contemplated, given that he denied being aware of the hazing.

Overall, the Redmen finished with an even 28–28 record and reached the playoffs five times during McMann's six seasons with the team. McMann resigned in January 2007 with one more year remaining on his contract. He cited personal reasons, adding that he wanted to "spend more time coaching and less on administrative matters". He later returned to the Stampeders that same month as receivers coach, before being released at the end of the season.

McMann joined the BC Lions in 2008 as their special teams coordinator and running backs coach, reuniting with Buono. He won his fourth and final Grey Cup championship with the franchise in 2011. He retired at the end of the 2015 season.

== Personal life ==
McMann was married to Margaret until his death. They resided in Langley, British Columbia, where he was a member of the Willoughby Christian Reformed Church, and she taught at Langley Christian High School. He brought the Grey Cup trophy to the school in January 2012, shortly after the Lions' victory the previous year. They later moved to Vancouver Island.

McMann died at the age of 70 on July 20, 2021, after collapsing while riding his bike near his home on the Island.
