= 9th Vanier Cup =

1973 Canadian university football championship

| Saint Mary's Huskies | McGill Redmen |
|---|---|
| 14 | 6 |
| Head coach: Al Keith | Head coach: Charlie Baillie |
| | 1 | 2 | 3 | 4 | Total |
|---|---|---|---|---|---|
| Saint Mary's Huskies | 0 | 0 | 0 | 14 | 14 |
| McGill Redmen | 0 | 0 | 0 | 6 | 6 |
- Date: November 24, 1973
- Stadium: Exhibition Stadium
- Location: Toronto
- Ted Morris Memorial Trophy: Ken Clark, Saint Mary's
- Attendance: 17,000

The 9th Vanier Cup was played on November 24, 1973, at Exhibition Stadium in Toronto, Ontario, and decided the CIAU football champion for the 1973 season. The Saint Mary's Huskies won their first ever championship by defeating the McGill Redmen by a score of 14-6.
