= Doug Kerr =

Canadian football coach

Personal information
- Died: May 20, 1960 (aged 58); Montreal, Quebec, Canada

Career information
- High school: High School of Montreal

Career history
- 1923: Westmount AAA Juniors
- 1924–1934: Westmount/Westward AAA Intermediates
- 1935: McGill (Freshmen)
- 1936–1945: McGill

Awards and highlights
- Yates Cup (1938)

William Richard Douglas "Pop" Kerr was a Canadian football coach who was the head coach at McGill from 1936 to 1946.

== Westmount/Westward AAA ==
Kerr was born in Montreal and attended High School of Montreal. He played football for Westmount AAA Juniors, but a spinal injury led him to move to coaching. He led the Westmount Juniors to a Quebec Rugby Football Union title in 1923 and was appointed intermediate coach in 1924. In 1925, the association's name was changed from the Westmount AAA to the Westward AAA. In 1929, Kerr coached Westward to the Dominion Intermediate Championship. They reached the final in 1932, but lost to St. Thomas by a single point. During the 1930s, he helped revive Westwards lacrosse program.

== McGill ==
Kerr was named McGill's freshman coach in 1935 and was promoted to varsity coach the following season. His 1938 team defeated Western 9–0 to win the Yates Cup. During World War II, he oversaw McGill's intramural football program. He retired after the 1946 season.

== Personal life ==
Outside of football, Kerr worked for the Chase & Sanborn Coffee Company and its successor, Standard Brands, for more than 35 years. He had two children with his wife Kathleen. Kerr died on May 20, 1960 at the age of 58.
