= Howard Stupp =

Canadian wrestler (born 1955)

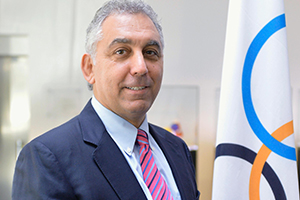

Personal information
- Full name: Howard Michael Stupp
- Born: 3 May 1955 (age 71) Montreal, Quebec, Canada
- Education: McGill University (BEng '78, LLB '83, BCL '83)

Sport
- Country: Canada
- Sport: Wrestling
Medal record
Pan American Games
Gold medal – first place	1975 Mexico City	Greco-Roman wrestling
Gold medal – first place	1979 Puerto Rico	Greco-Roman wrestling
Maccabiah Games
Silver medal – second place	1977 Israel	Wrestling
Gold medal – first place	1981 Israel	Greco-Roman wrestling
Gold medal – first place	1981 Israel	Freestyle wrestling
Gold medal – first place	1985 Israel	Greco-Roman wrestling
Gold medal – first place	1985 Israel	Freestyle wrestling

Howard Michael Stupp (born 3 May 1955) is a Canadian former wrestler. An Olympian, he won five Canadian championships (1976, 1978, 1979, 1980, 1981), two Pan Am Games titles (1975, 1979), two Canadian Interuniversity Athletics Union championships, and four titles at the Maccabiah Games in Israel. After graduating from McGill University, he worked at the International Olympic Committee, including 35 years as the Director of Legal Affairs.

== Biography ==
=== Early life ===
Stupp is from Montreal, Quebec, Canada, later lived in Laval, Quebec, and Lausanne, Switzerland, and is Jewish. He attended Chomedey Polyvalent High School.

Stupp graduated with three degrees from McGill University, in Montreal, earning an engineering degree (1978), a bachelor of common law (1983), and a bachelor of laws (LLB; 1983).

=== Career ===
He won a gold medal in Greco-Roman wrestling at the 1975 Pan American Games in Mexico City. Stupp won gold again in the 1979 Pan Am Games in Puerto Rico.

Stupp won five Canadian championships (1976, 1978, 1979, 1980, 1981), two Pan Am Games titles (1975, 1979), two Canadian Interuniversity Athletics Union championships, and four Maccabiah Games titles.

He represented Canada in the men's Greco-Roman 62 kg at the 1976 Summer Olympics. and lost in the first round to the eventual Gold medalist. Stupp was also named to the Canadian Olympic wrestling team for the 1980 Olympic Games in Moscow, however the games were boycotted by Canada.

Stupp represented Canada at the 1973 Maccabiah Games in Israel, winning a silver medal, at the 1977 Maccabiah Games, winning gold medals in the lightweight division of both freestyle and Greco-Roman, at the 1981 Maccabiah Games, winning two gold medals, and at the 1985 Maccabiah Games.

He became the first McGill recipient to be selected as the most outstanding wrestler—receiving that honour at the 1977-78 Canadian Interuniversity Sport championship—and earned CIAU All-Canadian status for the second time, in 1980-81 after winning gold in the 72 kg weight class at the Canadian Nationals.

After Stupp graduated from McGill University, he worked at the International Olympic Committee from 1981 until 2020, where he attained the position of Director of Legal Affairs, and held that post for 35 years.

=== Halls of fame ===
Stupp was inducted to the Canadian Amateur Wrestling Hall of Fame in 1988. In 2000 he was inducted into the McGill Athletics Hall of Fame.
