= Michael Soles =

Canadian football player (1966–2021)

No. 32
- Position: Fullback/Slotback

Personal information
- Born: November 8, 1966; Pointe-Claire, Quebec, Canada
- Died: July 7, 2021 (aged 54); Pointe-Claire, Quebec, Canada

Career information
- College: McGill
- CFL draft: 1989: 1st round, 5th overall pick

Career history
- 1989–1995: Edmonton Eskimos
- 1996–1999: Montreal Alouettes

Awards and highlights
- Grey Cup champion (1993); Lew Hayman Trophy (1996); Vanier Cup (1987); Ted Morris Memorial Trophy (1987); Peter Gorman Trophy (1986); CFL All-Star (1996); CFL North All-Star (1995)

Michael Soles (November 8, 1966 – July 7, 2021) was a Canadian professional football player who was a fullback in the Canadian Football League (CFL). He played college football at McGill University, where he was a two-time All-Canadian.

== Early life and collegiate football career ==
Soles was born in Pointe-Claire, Quebec, on November 8, 1966. He attended St. Thomas High School in his hometown, where he played high school football. He studied history and economics at McGill University, earning a Bachelor of Arts in 1989. As a Redman, he was honoured as a conference all-star three times and was a two-time All-Canadian. He also rushed for a then-team record 2,231 yards in 20 regular season games. The highlight of his university football career came in the 1987 Vanier Cup, when he led the underdog McGill team to an upset 47–11 victory over the University of British Columbia Thunderbirds, who were the favourites. He rushed for 203 yards and had 2 touchdowns, and won the Ted Morris Memorial Trophy as the game MVP.

== Professional career ==
Soles practiced with the Pittsburgh Steelers and Green Bay Packers. He was subsequently drafted by the Edmonton Eskimos in the first round of the 1989 CFL draft (fifth overall selection), the first player from a Canadian university to be chosen that year. This started a seven-year career with the franchise. His best season came in 1992, when he led the franchise with a career-high 656 rushing yards. He won the Grey Cup the following year and was a Northern Division All-Star in 1995.

After becoming a free agent, Soles signed with his hometown Montreal Alouettes in 1996. On November 2, 1997, he scored the franchise's first touchdown at the Percival Molson Memorial Stadium after their re-establishment. Paired with the all-time CFL rushing great Mike Pringle, Soles became a blocking back, leading the way for Pringle and catching many short yardage passes. He was honoured as a CFL All-Star in 1996 and won the Lew Hayman Trophy that year as best Canadian player in the East. When he retired, Pringle paid him a supreme compliment, saying he would have never gained the yards he did without Soles' blocking.

Soles finished his 11-year career with 3,007 rushing yards, 3,501 receiving yards (on 325 catches) and 45 touchdowns.

== Personal life and death ==
Soles was married to Catherine until his death. Together, they had three children: Anthony, Matthew, and Justine. Matthew followed his father's footsteps to collegiate football when he was recruited by McGill in August 2019.

After retiring from football, Soles worked in finance. He and his family resided in the West Island of Montreal, in Beaconsfield. He was elected to the McGill University Sports Hall of Fame in 2000. Soles was diagnosed with amyotrophic lateral sclerosis in 2005, but lived beyond the 2–5 year normal life expectancy for individuals diagnosed with the disease. His former Redmen teammates established the Michael Soles Football Award in 2014, collecting nearly C$229,000 for scholarships to support McGill's varsity program.

He died on July 7, 2021, at Lakeshore General Hospital in Pointe-Claire. He was 54 years old.
