= Ray Baillie =

Canadian football pleyer (1935–2015)

Profile
- Positions: Guard, Tackle

Personal information
- Born: February 14, 1935; Montreal, Quebec
- Died: May 10, 2015 (aged 80); Montreal, Quebec
- Listed height: 6 ft 0 in (1.83 m)
- Listed weight: 170 lb (77 kg)

Career history
- 1954–1955: Calgary Stampeders
- 1956–1957: Montreal Alouettes
- 1957: Hamilton Tiger Cats
- 1960–1961: Montreal Alouettes
- 1962–1963: Edmonton Eskimos
- 1965: Montreal Alouettes

Raymond Joslin Baillie (February 14, 1935 – May 10, 2015) was a Canadian professional football player who played for the Calgary Stampeders, Edmonton Eskimos, Montreal Alouettes and Hamilton Tiger Cats. His twin brother, Charlie Baillie (1935–2025), also played in the CFL.

After his CFL career Ray Baillie coached football, for the Ville-Émard Rams, and later coached the Chomedey Chiefs (currently the Panthers). He then joined his twin brother Charlie on the coaching staff of the McGill Redmen. Ray served as defensive coordinator at McGill from 1972 to 1978, including the 1973 season when the Redmen won the Quebec championship.

His primary career was as a teacher for nearly 40 years, most notably at Chomedey Polyvalent High School in Laval, where he taught Canadian history.

After his retirement in 1994, he traveled throughout Quebec along with his wife gathering information and photography for a trilogy of books he would later publish entitled Imprints: Discovering The Historic Face of English Quebec. In 2010, he published a fourth book, Scottish Imprints in Quebec.
