= Larry Sullivan (gridiron football) =

American football player and coach

Biographical details
- Born: November 2, 1919; Brockton, Massachusetts, U.S.
- Died: February 16, 1998 (aged 78); Pompano Beach, Florida, U.S.

Playing career
- 1939–1941: Notre Dame
- 1943: Camp Lejeune
- Position: Tackle

Coaching career (HC unless noted)
- 1947–1953: Cathedral HS (ON)
- 1954–1957: McGill
- 1958: Boston College (Ends)

Head coaching record
- Overall: 7–16–1 (CIAU)

Accomplishments and honors

Championships
- 2x Hamilton city champions (1948, 1952); Ontario provincial champion (1951)

Lawrence Patrick Sullivan (November 2, 1919 – February 16, 1998) was an American gridiron football player and coach who played for the Notre Dame Fighting Irish football team from 1939 to 1941 and was the head coach of the McGill Redmen football team from 1954 to 1957.

== Playing ==
Sullivan was the youngest of three children born to Irish immigrants in Brockton, Massachusetts. He played football and ice hockey at Brockton High School and was teammates with Rocky Marciano on the former. After graduating, he attended the University of Notre Dame on a football scholarship and was the starting left tackle on the undefeated 1941 Notre Dame Fighting Irish football team. He graduated in 1942, but was unable to attended the commencement ceremonies because he had to report to officer training at the Marine Corps Recruit Depot Parris Island. He played tackle for the 1943 Camp Lejeune Marines football team. On August 16, 1945, Sullivan married a navy nurse, Jane Smith, on the Admiralty Islands. Sullivan was discharged in 1946 with the rank of captain.

== Coaching ==
Sullivan began his coaching career at Cathedral High School in Hamilton, Ontario. He led the team to city championships in 1948 and 1952 and a provincial championship in 1951. His coached future Canadian Football League players Frank Cosentino and Ron Murphy. In 1954, he was named head football coach at McGill University after Vic Obeck stepped down to focus on his duties as athletic director. The Redmen went 0–6 in Sullivan's first season as head coach, but improved to 2–3–1 the following year. After a 2–4 1956 season, McGill had its best season under Sullivan, going 3–3. On June 10, 1958, Sullivan resigned as head coach to return to his native Massachusetts. On September 6, 1958, he joined the coaching staff at Boston College, succeeding athletic director William J. Flynn as ends coach.

== Later life ==
Sullivan left coaching in 1959 to take a more lucrative job as commercial real estate broker in Morrisville, Pennsylvania. He retired in 1985 and moved to Pompano Beach, Florida in 1996. He died on February 16, 1998, of Hepatitis C. He was 78 years old. He was survived by wife and his four children.
