= Arthur Burridge =

Canadian athletic director and football coach

Biographical details
- Born: May 22, 1891; Toronto, Ontario, Canada
- Died: November 26, 1981 (aged 90); Lindsay, Ontario, Canada
- Education: McMaster University

Coaching career (HC unless noted)

Football
- 1916–1927: Lisgar Collegiate
- 1928–1929: McGill
- 1930–1932: McMaster
- 1941: McMaster

Men's basketball
- 1941: McMaster

Men's basketball
- 1916–1928: Lisgar Collegiate
- 1930–1937: McMaster

Administrative career (AD unless noted)
- 1930–1948: McMaster

Arthur Alfred Burridge (May 22, 1891 – November 26, 1981) was a Canadian coach and administrator who was the director of athletics and physical education at McMaster University from 1930 to 1948.

== Biography ==
Burridge graduated from McMaster University in 1915. He took postgraduate courses at the University of Michigan, where studied the coaching of Fielding H. Yost. In 1916, he became a physical instructor at the Ottawa Collegiate Institute (now Lisgar Collegiate Institute), where he played a major role in creating the Eastern Ontario Secondary School Athletic Association and was the first football coach in Eastern Canada to use the forward pass. He also spent seven years as a playgrounds supervisor in Toronto and was the principal of the Ontario Department of Education's summer training school for physical education teachers at the Hart House.

In 1928, Burridge was appointed assistant physical director and assistant football coach at McGill University. Although an assistant in title, the head football coach was an honorary position and Burridge oversaw all three of McGill's football teams along with a graduate coaching board. The 1928 McGill varsity football team captured the Yates Cup, its first since 1919. In 1929, Burridge handed much of the coaching responsibility to one of the graduate coaches, Tommy Hall. In addition to his football duties, Burridge also oversaw intramural sports.

In 1930, Burridge was appointed director of physical education of McMaster University, which was about to move to its new campus in Hamilton, Ontario. He served as head coach of the football and men's basketball teams. He handed over football coaching duties to Fred Veale in 1933 to focus on his administrative duties and the basketball team. Burridge wrote the music for Shout for McMaster! (The McMaster March), the school's fight song. His wife wrote the lyrics to another school song, The Alma Mater Song. He resigned in 1948 after his proposal for a degree course in physical education was rejected. At Burridge's recommendation, Ivor Wynne was appointed to succeed him.

In 1974, McMaster's Arthur Burridge Gymnasium was named in his honor. He died on November 26, 1981.
