= Geoff Baker (journalist) =

Canadian journalist

- Born: Montreal, Canada
- Occupation: Journalist
- Years active: 1987–present

Geoff Baker is a Canadian-born journalist currently working as an NHL writer and columnist while also doubling as a sports enterprise and investigative reporter.

== Early life and education ==
Baker was born in Montreal, Quebec, and raised in the suburb of Laval, Quebec. A graduate of Chomedey High School, Baker played football for the Vanier College Cheetahs (CEGEP) 1987 provincial championship football team and attended training camp with the Concordia University Stingers as a slot receiver in 1989.

== Journalism career ==
After summer internships at the Toronto Star and The Gazette in Montreal, Baker was hired full-time by The Gazette as a night police reporter in 1991.

== Awards and recognition ==
In Canada, Baker won the country's National Newspaper Award three times in 1994 (spot news), 1997 (sports) and 2005 (sports) and was a top-three finalist in 1992 (spot news). The final award, in 2005, was for a series on steroids use by young baseball players in the Dominican Republic. Those stories also helped Baker become the first Canadian to win an Associated Press Sports Editors (APSE) award in the highest-newspaper-circulation category.

Baker won a second APSE award, with the Seattle Times, in 2014 for a story about troubled indoor soccer owner Dion Earl. He has been a finalist for seven other APSE prizes with the Times, in 2006, 2009, 2010, 2013, and 2015.

== 1998 Tim Johnson controversy and firing ==
Upon joining the Toronto Star in June 1998, Baker became aware that manager Tim Johnson had talked to players about serving in the U.S. Marine Corps and fighting overseas during the Vietnam War. But Baker knew Johnson had not served overseas and the manager quickly claimed he had never told such stories to players or coaches. On September 23, 1998, Baker wrote an initial story describing a rift among team coaches and a heated bar argument between them over Johnson's fake Vietnam stories. A much-larger, feature-length follow-up story, on October 18, 1998, quoted players on and off the record about having been told Vietnam stories by Johnson. The most damaging quotes came from former Cy Young Award winner Pat Hentgen, who described Johnson telling him about his Vietnam hardships while on the field at Fenway Park before a series with the Red Sox. Johnson had just told Hentgen he would not be starting in what was then a crucial series for the Blue Jays.

Johnson continued to deny he had told such stories until a Boston Globe column by Will McDonough in November 1998 mentioned that Johnson had told such war stories while serving as a Red Sox bench coach a few years earlier. A few weeks later, at the 1998 baseball winter meetings in Nashville, Johnson held a press conference admitting he had lied about serving in the war. The Blue Jays allowed Johnson to stay on as manager (he had won 88 games his only season in 1998) but fired him in spring training when it became clear players no longer respected him.

== 2003 White Jays controversy ==
On June 28, 2003, the Toronto Star ran a Baker story and accompanying sidebar under an A-1 front-page banner titled "The White Jays?" along with accompanying headshots of the 25 players on the Toronto Blue Jays baseball team. The stories themselves were about how the team had taken a decisive turn away from Latin American players and towards U.S.-born products after international scouting cutbacks under the regime of GM J.P. Ricciardi.

The front-page treatment of the stories sparked a widespread outcry in Toronto and more than 2,000 letters to the editor, to this day a record for Canada's largest newspaper. Moneyball author Michael Lewis wrote about the series as part of a Sports Illustrated feature that was later re-published as an afterword in the paperback version of his best-selling book.

The Toronto Star's ombudsman investigated and found no issue with the content of Baker's stories, but did criticize the paper's editors for their packaging of the story and front-page treatment. Baker later wrote a follow-up feature on the Blue Jays and their Latin American cutbacks in October 2005. This time, without the racially charged front-page treatment of the 2003 "White Jays" stories, the work by Baker was well-received, despite containing much the same subject matter.

== 2004 Carlos Delgado controversy ==
On July 4, 2004, the Toronto Star published "Citizen Carlos": a Baker-penned feature from Puerto Rico about how Blue Jays slugger Carlos Delgado was no longer standing on the field during the playing of God Bless America. Delgado had shared with Baker that he was silently protesting the U.S. invasion of Iraq. The Baker feature described Delgado's work with activists on the Puerto Rican island of Vieques and the fact that it had been the testing ground for uranium depleted shells dropped by the U.S. military on Iraq.

The story was later picked up by The New York Times and other U.S. news outlets, causing Delgado to be booed on subsequent trips to New York to play the Yankees or Mets. Upon joining the Mets in 2006, Delgado addressed the situation and agreed to stand on the field with teammates when "God Bless America" was played, saying he had made his point and did not wish to cause distractions.

== 2005 Dominican steroids stories ==
In April 2005, Baker and Toronto Star photographer Peter Power traveled to the Dominican Republic, where they spent a week touring the country's needle-ridden baseball fields to do a pair of feature stories on PED use by teenage prospects from that country. The groundbreaking series described the use of cheaper farm animal supplements as steroids alternatives and also produced an exposé of the country's "buscones"—street-level hustlers grooming prospects for bigger paydays in the U.S.

Baker won his third National Newspaper Award in Canada for the stories. He also became the first Canadian to win an APSE Award in the United States, in the highest newspaper circulation category.

The aftermath of the series led to Baker being hired by the Seattle Times. He has since traveled to Venezuela to write about steroids testing there and was invited to speak at an October 2006 sports conference in Caracas about the exploitation faced by Latin American ballplayers.

A photograph by Power from the Toronto Star series, of a young Dominican throwing a baseball in a sugar-cane field, his bicycle perched against a tree in the foreground, was used by filmmaker Ken Burns to illustrate the opening of the Dominican portion of his 2010 baseball documentary, The Tenth Inning.

== 2010 Josh Lueke controversy ==
The Mariners made a blockbuster July 2010 trade of ace pitcher Cliff Lee to the Texas Rangers for Justin Smoak and three prospects, one of them a relief pitcher named Josh Lueke. There were reports all over Google about how Lueke had pleaded no contest to a charge of false imprisonment with violence after being arrested for rape and sodomy in 2008. At first, the Mariners, known for their "family friendly" image and support of a "Refuse to Abuse" campaign pertaining to violence against women, denied knowing about Lueke's background and added it was too late to reverse the trade or do anything further other than let Lueke play.

But on September 1, 2010, Baker published an A-1 story disputing that version of events. Baker quoted Rick Adair, a former Mariners pitching coach—who had also been in charge of minor league pitchers in Texas in 2008—saying he had warned GM Jack Zduriencik all about Lueke's troubled past before the trade was made. The story also quoted Rangers GM Jon Daniels saying he had offered Zduriencik a chance to give Lueke back and take another player, but that he refused to do so.

The Mariners have never commented on the discrepancy between their initial statements and the version presented by the sources named in Baker's story. In September 2010, they fired Carmen Fusco, their head of professional scouting. Fusco has since said he was made a scapegoat in the affair.

The story finished in 4th place in voting for an APSE award for Explanatory Reporting. It won a regional SPJ award for Sports Reporting in the Pacific Northwest.

== 2013 Eric Wedge/Mariners controversy ==
After a 16-year career as an MLB beat writer, Baker launched his new career as a sports investigative reporter with a December 8, 2013 feature story about the dysfunction permeating the upper levels of the Seattle Mariners hierarchy. Baker specifically addressed the reasons why manager Eric Wedge had walked out on the team in September, leaving a $2 million contract extension on the table. Using on-the-record quotes from Wedge, Baker painted a dysfunctional situation brought about by Mariners CEO Howard Lincoln, resident Chuck Armstrong and GM Jack Zduriencik. The story also quoted former Mariners GM assistant Tony Blengino saying he had drawn up Zduriencik's entire resume and had helped falsely portray him as an expert in advanced statistics in order to get the job.

The story was nominated for an APSE award for Explanatory Reporting. It won a regional SPJ Award for Sports Reporting in the Pacific Northwest.

== 2016 controversy over NBA arena reporting ==
Baker's reporting on the proposed SoDo arena in the Stadium District of Seattle drew criticism from the SB Nation website Sonics Rising, a group of Seattle area fans lobbying for the return of NBA basketball. The site has campaigned openly for the city to support hedge fund operator Chris Hansen in efforts to build a public-subsidized arena and private sports and entertainment development in SoDo. On February 22, 2016, Baker and the Editorial Board of The Seattle Times were accused by Seattle city councilman Tim Burgess of misreporting facts to suit personal bias against the arena. The allegation came via a memo introduced by Burgess in council after a front-page story by Baker suggesting council members delayed publicizing a report by architectural firm AECOM in 2015 that concluded KeyArena could be remodeled for NBA and NHL use. Sonics Rising and two local bloggers used the occasion to again accuse Baker of biased reporting. They referenced a story of Baker's from the previous November about M.T. Phoenix, a company that offered to help finance a KeyArena renovation. The city never responded to or investigated the legitimacy of M.T. Phoenix and claimed that it legally could not entertain offers pertaining to KeyArena. The city later rebuffed a separate offer from businessman Victor Coleman, who was interested in a KeyArena renovation. Follow up stories on M.T. Phoenix, including one by Baker, found the M.T. Phoenix website contained inconsistencies.

Following the Burgess memo claiming inaccuracies in Baker's ensuing story in February, the newspaper met with Burgess. Seattle Times editor Kathy Best afterwards issued a statement that he had provided no example of factual errors in Baker's reporting and that no corrections would be made. Subsequent stories by Seattle Weekly and the national Field of Schemes website concluded that Baker's story had been correct in finding discrepancies between the AECOM report and the city's claim that KeyArena could not be remodeled for NBA and NHL. Both also found no merit to the Burgess claim of factual inaccuracies in Baker's story. Baker, in a follow-up report in April 2016, showed city hall officials had worried ahead of time that the AECOM report on KeyArena contradicted a city-issued environmental study on Hansen's Sodo arena. On May 2, 2016, the city voted against selling a public street so Hansen could build the arena, effectively stopping the project. Baker's arena stories earned him a finalist nod for a 2016 APSE award in investigative reporting.

On September 12, 2017, the City of Seattle and Oak View Group agreed on a $600 million deal to renovate KeyArena for NBA and NHL teams.
