= Laurier Senior High School =

School in Laval, Quebec, Canada

Coordinates: 45.5641°N 73.7502°W

Laurier Senior High School (LSHS), originally Laval Catholic High School (LCHS), was an Anglophone senior high school in Laval, Quebec. A part of the Sir Wilfrid Laurier School Board (SWLSB), it operated the last three secondary grades.

In order to adjust to deconfessionalization, the school was renamed from Laval Catholic High School to Laurier Senior High School on July 1, 2005. At around the same time, its corresponding junior high school in the same building, Sacred Heart Middle School, was renamed to Mother Teresa Junior High School. This name was chosen for the latter because its namesake had visited the building in October 1988.

The original school and its original campus (building) opened in 1969, but originally serving all secondary grades. It was preceded by Chomedey Catholic, which was another building. Within the next twenty years, Sacred Heart Middle School was opened in the same building and from then on, the juniors (students in the first two secondary grades) and the seniors (students in the last three secondary grades) were served separately. The school's attendance boundary was all of Laval. On July 1, 2015, it merged with Laval Liberty High School to form Laval Senior Academy.

== Notable alumni ==
- Mike Bossy - Hockey player for the New York Islanders and member of the Hockey Hall of Fame.
- Jeff Kuhner - journalist, radio personality, educator
- Thomas Mulcair - Former leader of the New Democratic Party
