= Laval Liberty High School =

School in Laval, Quebec, Canada

Coordinates: 45.5526°N 73.7421°W

Laval Liberty High School (LLHS) was an Anglophone senior high school in Laval, Quebec and a part of the Sir Wilfrid Laurier School Board (SWLSB). It was formed in 2005 after Western Laval High School was split into two schools, with lower secondary levels forming Laval Junior High School. On July 1, 2015, it merged with Laurier Senior High School to form Laval Senior Academy.
