= Charlie Baillie =

Canadian football player (1935–2025)

Charles Baillie
Profile
- Positions: Fullback, Center

Personal information
- Born: February 14, 1935; Montreal, Quebec, Canada
- Died: February 17, 2025 (aged 90); Montreal, Quebec, Canada
- Listed height: 6 ft 0 in (1.83 m)
- Listed weight: 208 lb (94 kg)

Career history
- 1954: Montreal Alouettes
- 1955: Calgary Stampeders
- 1956–1965: Montreal Alouettes

Charles Bishop Baillie (February 14, 1935 – February 17, 2025) was a Canadian professional football player who played for the Calgary Stampeders and Montreal Alouettes. His twin brother, Ray Baillie (1935–2015), also played in the CFL. Charlie Baillie died in Montreal on February 17, 2025, at the age of 90.
